= 2023–24 PSA World Tour =

International squash tour

Details
- Event name: PSA World Tour 2023–24
- Dates: August 2023 – July 2024
- Categories: World Championship: Men's/Women's; World Tour Finals: Men's/Women's; PSA Challenger Tour; WSF & PSA Satellite Tour
- Website; PSA World Tour

Achievements
- World Number 1: Men: (Egypt) Ali Farag; Women: (Egypt) Nour El Sherbini
- World Champion: Men: (Peru) Diego Elías; Women: (Egypt) Nouran Gohar

The 2023–24 PSA World Tour is the international squash tour organised circuit organized by the Professional Squash Association (PSA) for the 2023–24 squash season. It's the 9th PSA season since the merger of PSA and WSA associations in 2015.

The most important tournaments in the series are the PSA World Championship for Men's and Women's. The tour also features two circuits of regular events—PSA World Tour (formerly PSA World Series), which feature the highest prize money and the best fields; and PSA Challenger Tour with prize money ranging $3,000–$30,000. In the middle of the year (usually in June), the PSA World Tour tour is concluded by the Men's and Women's PSA World Tour Finals in Bellevue, United States, the season-ending championships for the top 8 rated players from World Tour level tournaments.

== Overview ==
=== PSA World Tour changes ===
Starting in August 2018, PSA revamped its professional tour structure in two individual circuits; PSA World Tour and PSA Challenger Tour.

PSA World Tour (formerly PSA World Series) will comprise most important tournaments in prize money for more experienced and higher-ranked players, including PSA World Championships and PSA World Tour Finals, labelled as following:

- PSA World Tour Platinum — 48-player draws — $170,000–$300,000
- PSA World Tour Gold — 24-player draws — $90,000–$110,000
- PSA World Tour Silver — 24-player draws — $70,000–$85,000
- PSA World Tour Bronze — 24-player draws — $45,000–$55,000

PSA Challenger Tour tournaments will offer a $3,000–$30,000 prize-money, ideal circuit for less-experienced and upcoming players, that will include the following tiers:

- PSA Challenger Tour 30 — $30,000
- PSA Challenger Tour 20 — $20,000
- PSA Challenger Tour 15 — $15,000 (starting August 2023)
- PSA Challenger Tour 12 — $12,000 (starting August 2023)
- PSA Challenger Tour 9 — $9,000 (starting August 2023)
- PSA Challenger Tour 6 — $6,000 (starting August 2023)
- PSA Challenger Tour 3 — $3,000 (starting August 2020)

=== Prize money/ranking points breakdown ===
PSA World Tour events also have a separate World Tour ranking. Points for this are calculated on a cumulative basis after each World Tour event. The top eight players at the end of the calendar year are then eligible to play in the PSA World Tour Finals.

Ranking points vary according to tournament tier being awarded as follows:

PSA World Tour			Ranking Points						
Rank	Prize money US$	Ranking Points	Winner	Runner up	3/4	5/8	9/16	17/32	33/48
Platinum	$170,000–$300,000	19188 points	2750	1810	1100	675	410	250	152.5
Gold	$90,000–$110,000	10660 points	1750	1150	700	430	260	160	
Silver	$70,000–$85,000	7470 points	1225	805	490	300	182.5	112.5	
Bronze	$45,000–$55,000	5330 points	875	575	350	215	130	80	
PSA World Tour Finals			Ranking Points						
Rank	Prize money US$	Winner	Runner up	3/4	Round-Robin Match Win	Undefeated bonus			
World Tour Finals	$185,000	1000	550	200	150	150			
PSA Challenger Tour			Ranking Points						
Rank	Prize money US$	Ranking Points	Winner	Runner up	3/4	5/8	9/16	17/32	33/48
Challenger Tour 30	$30,000	3194 points	525	345	210	130	78	47.5	
Challenger Tour 20	$20,000	2112 points	350	230	140	85	51	31.5	
Challenger Tour 15	$15,000	1522.5 points	250	162.5	100	62.5	37.5	22.5	
Challenger Tour 12	$12,000	1218 points	200	130	80	50	30	18	
Challenger Tour 9	$9,000	913.5 points	150	97.5	60	37.5	22.5	13.5	
Challenger Tour 6	$6,000	609 points	100	65	40	25	15	9	
Challenger Tour 3	$3,000	375 points	65	40	25	15	9	5.5	
PSA World Championships			Ranking Points						
Rank	Prize money US$	Ranking Points	Winner	Runner up	3/4	5/8	9/16	17/32	33/64
PSA World Championships	$500,000	25045 points	3175	2090	1270	780	475	290	177.5

== Calendar ==
=== Key ===
PSA Tiers
World Championship
World Tour Platinum
World Tour Gold
World Tour Silver
World Tour Bronze
Challenger Tour 3/6/9/12/15/20/30

=== August ===
Tournament	Date	Champion	Runner-Up	Semifinalists	Quarterfinalists
City of Devonport Tasmanian Open; Devonport, Australia; Men : Challenger 6; 32 players - $6,000	2–6 August	(New Zealand) Elijah Thomas; 11–9, 11–7, 9–11, 11–7 (1st PSA title)	(Hong Kong) Ho Ka Hei	(Hong Kong) Lam Shing Fung (Hong Kong) Harley Lam	(Australia) Dylan Molinaro (France) Paul Gonzalez (Japan) Naoki Hayashi (Japan) Tomotaka Endo
Ponta Lagoa Brazil Open; Ponta Grossa, Brazil; Men : Challenger 3; 16 players - $3,000	3–6 August	(Brazil) Guilherme Melo; 15–17, 11–7, 11–3, 11–7 (2nd PSA title)	(Brazil) Diego Gobbi	(Paraguay) Francesco Marcantonio (Brazil) Rhuan Sousa	(Brazil) Gabriel Pederiva (Brazil) Vitor Magnani (Brazil) Vinicius Berbel (Brazil) Matheus Carbonieri
Windsor Cup; Windsor, Canada; Men : World Tour Bronze; 24 players – $52,500	15–19 August	(Egypt) Tarek Momen; 11–8, 11–5, 3–11, 8–11, 11–7 (9th PSA title)	(Egypt) Youssef Soliman	(Egypt) Yahya Elnawasany (Egypt) Mohamed ElSherbini	(France) Grégoire Marche (Scotland) Greg Lobban (Egypt) Omar Mosaad (United States) Andrew Douglas
Windsor City Open; Windsor, Canada; Men : Challenger 6; 24 players – $6,000 −−−−−− Women : Challenger 9; 24 players – $9,000	15–19 August	(Canada) George Crowne; 11–2, 12–10, 4–11, 11–9 (1st PSA title)	(Canada) Brett Schille	(Nigeria) Babatunde Ajagbe (Canada) Mitchell Kahnert	(Canada) Cory McCartney (Canada) Liam Marrison (Canada) Abbas Nawaz (Canada) Connor Turk
Windsor City Open; Windsor, Canada; Men : Challenger 6; 24 players – $6,000 −−−−−− Women : Challenger 9; 24 players – $9,000	15–19 August	(United States) Marina Stefanoni; 9–11, 11–7, 11–5, 11–8 (7th PSA title)	(Egypt) Nour Heikal	(United States) Caroline Fouts (United States) Lucie Stefanoni	(Canada) Nikki Todd (Colombia) Laura Tovar (Wales) Ali Loke (Colombia) Lucía Bautista
Costa North Coast Open; Korora, Australia; Men : Challenger 12; 24 players – $12,000 −−−−−− Women : Challenger 12; 16 players – $12,000	16–20 August	(Malaysia) Addeen Idrakie; 11–8, 11–2, 11–9 (7th PSA title)	(India) Velavan Senthilkumar	(Malaysia) Darren Pragasam (Malaysia) Ivan Yuen	(Malaysia) Ong Sai Hung (Australia) Joseph White (Hong Kong) Chung Yat Long (Scotland) Alasdair Prott
Costa North Coast Open; Korora, Australia; Men : Challenger 12; 24 players – $12,000 −−−−−− Women : Challenger 12; 16 players – $12,000	16–20 August	(India) Tanvi Khanna; 7–11, 12–10, 12–10, 11–8 (3rd PSA title)	(Malaysia) Chan Yiwen	(Australia) Alex Haydon (Australia) Jessica Turnbull	(India) Joshna Chinappa (Australia) Sarah Cardwell (India) Urwashi Joshi (Malaysia) Yasshmita Jadishkumar
Torneo Profesional Mexicano de Squash; Mexico City, Mexico; Men : Challenger 9; 24 players – $9,000 −−−−−− Women : Challenger 3; 16 players – $3,000	16–20 August	(Colombia) Matías Knudsen; 11–8, 11–6, 11–4 (2nd PSA title)	(Argentina) Jeremías Azaña	(Mexico) Carlos Vargas (Mexico) Sebastián Salazar	(Mexico) Jorge Gómez (Colombia) Edgar Ramírez (Mexico) Alfredo Ávila (Mexico) Bryan Cueto
Torneo Profesional Mexicano de Squash; Mexico City, Mexico; Men : Challenger 9; 24 players – $9,000 −−−−−− Women : Challenger 3; 16 players – $3,000	16–20 August	(Mexico) Diana García; 8–11, 11–9, 6–11, 14–12, 12–10 (5th PSA title)	(Mexico) Sarahí López	(Ecuador) Cari Buenaño (Colombia) Catalina Peláez	(Guatemala) Winifer Bonilla (Mexico) Ofelia Barriga (Mexico) Andrea Juárez (Mexico) Julieta Mondragón
The Hague Open; The Hague, Netherlands; Men : Challenger 6; 24 players - $6,000	16–20 August	(India) Mahesh Mangaonkar; 11–7, 11–4, 11–1 (9th PSA title)	(Wales) Owain Taylor	(Egypt) Mohamed Nasser (Belgium) Joeri Hapers	(Republic of Ireland) Sean Conroy (Egypt) Omar Elkattan (New Zealand) Anthony Lepper (England) Lewis Doughty
Tuanku Muhriz Trophy; Seremban, Malaysia; Men : Challenger 15; 24 players - $15,000 −−−−−− Women : Challenger 15; 24 players - $15,000	23–27 August	(Egypt) Aly Hussein; 11–3, 11–1, 11–4 (3rd PSA title)	(Pakistan) Asim Khan	(Malaysia) Addeen Idrakie (Malaysia) Ivan Yuen	(Hong Kong) Tang Ming Hong (Egypt) Yassin ElShafei (Switzerland) Yannick Wilhelmi (Wales) Emyr Evans
Tuanku Muhriz Trophy; Seremban, Malaysia; Men : Challenger 15; 24 players - $15,000 −−−−−− Women : Challenger 15; 24 players - $15,000	23–27 August	(Malaysia) Sivasangari Subramaniam; 11–8, 11–8, 11–9 (12th PSA title)	(Malaysia) Aira Azman	(Malaysia) Ainaa Amani (Egypt) Nour Heikal	(Malaysia) Yasshmita Jadishkumar (Egypt) Malak Khafagy (Egypt) Menna Hamed (Malaysia) Chan Yiwen
Jansher Khan Canberra Open; Canberra, Australia; Men : Challenger 6; 24 players - $6,000 −−−−−− Women : Challenger 6; 16 players - $6,000	23–27 August	(India) Velavan Senthilkumar; 11–8, 11–9, 2–11, 11–3 (7th PSA title)	(Australia) Joseph White	(France) Brice Nicolas (New Zealand) Elijah Thomas	(Australia) Nicholas Calvert (Hong Kong) Chung Yat Long (India) Suraj Chand (Australia) James Lloyd
Jansher Khan Canberra Open; Canberra, Australia; Men : Challenger 6; 24 players - $6,000 −−−−−− Women : Challenger 6; 16 players - $6,000	23–27 August	(India) Akanksha Salunkhe; 9–11, 12–10, 8–11, 11–8, 13–11 (2nd PSA title)	(India) Tanvi Khanna	(Australia) Alex Haydon (Australia) Sarah Cardwell	(Australia) Sophie Fadaely (Australia) Erin Classen (Australia) Jennifer Condie (Malta) Colette Sultana
QuantiFi LifeTime MetroWest; Framingham, United States; Men : Challenger 6; 24 players - $6,000	26–30 August	(India) Veer Chotrani; 11–6, 12–10, 5–11, 11–4 (1st PSA title)	(Egypt) Mohamed Sharaf	(Egypt) Abdelrahman Nassar (Malaysia) Sanjay Jeeva	(Argentina) Jeremías Azaña (Egypt) Yusuf Elsherif (Egypt) Mohamed Nabil (Colombia) Nicolás Serna
Paris Squash; Paris, France; Men : World Tour Platinum; 48 players – $190,000 −−−−−− Women : World Tour Platinum; 48 players – $190,000	27 Aug. – 2 Sep.	(Egypt) Ali Farag; 2–11, 13–11, 11–1, 11–9 (34th PSA title)	(Peru) Diego Elías	(New Zealand) Paul Coll (England) Mohamed El Shorbagy	(Wales) Joel Makin (Egypt) Tarek Momen (France) Victor Crouin (Egypt) Mazen Hesham
Paris Squash; Paris, France; Men : World Tour Platinum; 48 players – $190,000 −−−−−− Women : World Tour Platinum; 48 players – $190,000	27 Aug. – 2 Sep.	(Egypt) Nour El Sherbini; 7–11, 11–4, 11–8, 11–5 (35th PSA title)	(Egypt) Nouran Gohar	(United States) Amanda Sobhy (England) Georgina Kennedy	(United States) Sabrina Sobhy (New Zealand) Joelle King (Egypt) Nour El Tayeb (Belgium) Nele Gilis
Volkswagen Bega Open; Bega, Australia; Men : Challenger 12; 24 players – $12,000 −−−−−− Women : Challenger 12; 24 players – $12,000	30 Aug. – 3 Sep.	(Japan) Ryūnosuke Tsukue; 11–4, 12–10, 11–4 (8th PSA title)	(India) Velavan Senthilkumar	(France) Brice Nicolas (Scotland) Alasdair Prott	(Australia) Joseph White (India) Suraj Chand (Australia) Tate Norris (New Zealand) Elijah Thomas
Volkswagen Bega Open; Bega, Australia; Men : Challenger 12; 24 players – $12,000 −−−−−− Women : Challenger 12; 24 players – $12,000	30 Aug. – 3 Sep.	(Egypt) Malak Khafagy; 7–11, 11–4, 11–7, 8–11, 11–8 (3rd PSA title)	(India) Tanvi Khanna	(Australia) Alex Haydon (Australia) Jessica Turnbull	(India) Akanksha Salunkhe (Japan) Akari Midorikawa (Australia) Erin Classen (Australia) Sarah Cardwell

=== September ===
Tournament	Date	Champion	Runner-Up	Semifinalists	Quarterfinalists
Pader Open; Paderborn, Germany; Men : Challenger 12; 24 players – $12,000 −−−−−− Women : Challenger 12; 24 players – $12,000	6–10 September	(Germany) Raphael Kandra; 11–8, 11–8, 11–9 (15th PSA title)	(Czech Republic) Viktor Byrtus	(Germany) Yannik Omlor (Hong Kong) Tang Ming Hong	(Hong Kong) Wong Chi Him (South Africa) Dewald van Niekerk (Spain) Iván Pérez (Spain) Edmon López
Pader Open; Paderborn, Germany; Men : Challenger 12; 24 players – $12,000 −−−−−− Women : Challenger 12; 24 players – $12,000	6–10 September	(England) Alicia Mead; 8–11, 11–7, 7–11, 11–8, 11–5 (3rd PSA title)	(Spain) Marta Domínguez	(Egypt) Haya Ali (Egypt) Rana Ismail	(Germany) Saskia Beinhard (Egypt) Nardine Garas (Switzerland) Cindy Merlo (England) Kiera Marshall
Complex 711 PSA Puebla; Santiago Momoxpan, Mexico; Men : Challenger 3; 24 players – $3,000	6–10 September	(Mexico) Sebastián Salazar; 7–11, 11–7, 11–6, 11–4 (1st PSA title)	(Mexico) Carlos Vargas	(Mexico) Leo Vargas (Mexico) Alejandro Reyes	(Mexico) Miled Zarazúa (Colombia) Felipe Tovar (Mexico) César Segundo (Mexico) Luis Aquino
QTerminals Qatar Classic; Doha, Qatar; Men : World Tour Platinum; 48 players – $187,500 −−−−−− Women : World Tour Platinum; 48 players – $187,500	9–16 September	(Egypt) Ali Farag; 15–13, 11–5, 8–11, 11–9 (35th PSA title)	(Peru) Diego Elías	(Egypt) Mazen Hesham (Wales) Joel Makin	(England) Mohamed El Shorbagy (Egypt) Tarek Momen (Egypt) Karim Abdel Gawad (Scotland) Greg Lobban
QTerminals Qatar Classic; Doha, Qatar; Men : World Tour Platinum; 48 players – $187,500 −−−−−− Women : World Tour Platinum; 48 players – $187,500	9–16 September	(Egypt) Hania El Hammamy; 9–11, 11–9, 9–11, 11–9, 11–6 (12th PSA title)	(Egypt) Nour El Sherbini	(United States) Amanda Sobhy (Belgium) Tinne Gilis	(Egypt) Salma Hany (England) Georgina Kennedy (Belgium) Nele Gilis (Egypt) Nouran Gohar
Assore & Balwin Joburg Open; Johannesburg, South Africa; Men : Challenger 3; 24 players – $3,000 −−−−−− Women : Challenger 3; 24 players – $3,000	12–16 September	(South Africa) Dewald van Niekerk; 11–6, 11–5, 11–5 (5th PSA title)	(South Africa) Jean-Pierre Brits	(South Africa) Ruan Olivier (South Africa) Damian Groenewald	(South Africa) Tristen Worth (South Africa) Jonty Matthys (Zambia) Kundanji Kalengo (Namibia) Arno Diekmann
Assore & Balwin Joburg Open; Johannesburg, South Africa; Men : Challenger 3; 24 players – $3,000 −−−−−− Women : Challenger 3; 24 players – $3,000	12–16 September	(Egypt) Menna Walid; 11–7, 12–10, 11–9 (1st PSA title)	(Egypt) Amina El Rihany	(South Africa) Helena Coetzee (South Africa) Teagan Roux	(Australia) Erin Classen (Egypt) Mariam Ashraf (South Africa) Hayley Ward (South Africa) Alexa Pienaar
Squash Inspire - Abbas Family; Columbia, United States; Men : Challenger 9; 24 players – $9,000	13–17 September	(England) Tom Walsh; 11–6, 12–10, 9–11, 11–5 (3rd PSA title)	(France) Edwin Clain	(Argentina) Jeremías Azaña (India) Veer Chotrani	(Austria) Aqeel Rehman (United States) Dillon Huang (France) Macéo Lévy (Colombia) Nicolás Serna
Quique Squash Brazil Open; Cianorte, Brazil; Men : Challenger 6; 24 players - $6,000	13–17 September	(Guatemala) Alejandro Enríquez; 11–5, 11–4, 11–6 (2nd PSA title)	(Guatemala) Josué Enríquez	(France) Toufik Mekhalfi (Brazil) Diego Gobbi	(France) Manuel Paquemar (France) Baptiste Bouin (Paraguay) Francesco Marcantonio (Guatemala) Luis Quisquinay
Charlottesville Open; Charlottesville, United States; Men : Challenger 30; 24 players - $30,000	14–18 September	(England) Nick Wall; 11–8, 12–14, 11–4, 11–6 (9th PSA title)	(England) Nathan Lake	(Canada) David Baillargeon (Colombia) Juan Camilo Vargas	(Mexico) Leonel Cárdenas (United States) Timothy Brownell (Egypt) Yahya Elnawasany (United States) Andrew Douglas
NASH Cup; London, Canada; Men : Challenger 20; 24 players – $20,000 −−−−−− Women : Challenger 20; 24 players – $20,000	19–23 September	(Canada) David Baillargeon; 11–8, 12–14, 11–9, 11–2 (7th PSA title)	(United States) Faraz Khan	(England) Curtis Malik (Spain) Bernat Jaume	(Egypt) Yahya Elnawasany (England) Finnlay Withington (England) Nick Wall (Malaysia) Sanjay Jeeva
NASH Cup; London, Canada; Men : Challenger 20; 24 players – $20,000 −−−−−− Women : Challenger 20; 24 players – $20,000	19–23 September	(Canada) Hollie Naughton; 5–11, 6–11, 11–5, 11–5, 11–7 (4th PSA title)	(Egypt) Salma El Tayeb	(United States) Marina Stefanoni (Colombia) Laura Tovar	(England) Lucy Turmel (Malaysia) Wen Li Lai (Poland) Karina Tyma (Canada) Nikki Todd
I SPAC Open; São Paulo, Brazil; Men : Challenger 6; 24 players – $6,000	19–23 September	(Colombia) Matías Knudsen; 10–12, 11–3, 11–4, 11–8 (3rd PSA title)	(Netherlands) Rowan Damming	(Colombia) Andrés Herrera (Guatemala) Josué Enríquez	(Colombia) Edgar Ramírez (Brazil) Diego Gobbi (Guatemala) Alejandro Enríquez (France) Toufik Mekhalfi
BDO Namibian Open; Windhoek, Namibia; Men : Challenger 3; 16 players – $3,000 −−−−−− Women : Challenger 3; 16 players – $3,000	20–23 September	(Nigeria) Onaopemipo Adegoke; 8–11, 10–12, 11–9, 11–9, 11–9 (1st PSA title)	(South Africa) Damian Groenewald	(Nigeria) Gabriel Olufunmilayo (South Africa) Diodivine Mkhize	(Nigeria) Kehinde Temitope (South Africa) Luhann Groenewald (Egypt) Abdelrahman Abdelkhalek (South Africa) John Anderson
BDO Namibian Open; Windhoek, Namibia; Men : Challenger 3; 16 players – $3,000 −−−−−− Women : Challenger 3; 16 players – $3,000	20–23 September	(Egypt) Menna Walid; 9–11, 11–5, 11–6, 11–4 (2nd PSA title)	(Egypt) Mariam Ashraf	(Egypt) Amina El Rihany (Nigeria) Blessing Isaac	(Nigeria) Abdulazeez Rofiat (South Africa) Hayley Ward (Nigeria) Favour Utukpe (Nigeria) Olatunji Busayo
Springfield Scottish Open; Inverness, Scotland; Men : Challenger 12; 24 players – $12,000 −−−−−− Women : Challenger 12; 24 players – $12,000	20–24 September	(Spain) Edmon López; 9–11, 11–8, 11–8, 11–6 (11th PSA title)	(England) Ben Smith	(Egypt) Kareem El Torkey (Israel) Daniel Poleshchuk	(England) Miles Jenkins (Scotland) Rory Stewart (England) James Peach (Republic of Ireland) Sam Buckley
Springfield Scottish Open; Inverness, Scotland; Men : Challenger 12; 24 players – $12,000 −−−−−− Women : Challenger 12; 24 players – $12,000	20–24 September	(England) Grace Gear; 11–2, 11–6, 11–6 (4th PSA title)	(England) Asia Harris	(Egypt) Nardine Garas (England) Torrie Malik	(England) Alicia Mead (New Zealand) Kaitlyn Watts (Scotland) Georgia Adderley (Egypt) Rana Ismail
Schräglage Squash Open; Böblingen, Germany; Men : Challenger 3; 24 players – $3,000 −−−−−− Women : Challenger 3; 24 players – $3,000	20–24 September	(Germany) Yannik Omlor; 11–9, 6–11, 13–11, 11–8 (3rd PSA title)	(Germany) Valentin Rapp	(Egypt) Omar Elkattan (Netherlands) Sebastiaan Hofman	(Liechtenstein) David Maier (Spain) Arón Astray (England) Jared Carter (Belgium) Lowie Delbeke
Schräglage Squash Open; Böblingen, Germany; Men : Challenger 3; 24 players – $3,000 −−−−−− Women : Challenger 3; 24 players – $3,000	20–24 September	(Singapore) Wai Yhann Au Yeong; 7–11, 11–7, 11–7, 11–4 (1st PSA title)	(England) Kiera Marshall	(Republic of Ireland) Breanne Flynn (Switzerland) Céline Walser	(Finland) Riina Koskinen (Switzerland) Nadia Pfister (Denmark) Klara Møller (England) Polly Clark
Louisville Open; Indian Hills, United States; Men : Challenger 20; 24 players – $20,000	25–29 September	(Argentina) Leandro Romiglio; 9–11, 11–3, 11–7, 11–1 (12th PSA title)	(United States) Faraz Khan	(United States) Timothy Brownell (Colombia) Juan Camilo Vargas	(Mexico) Leonel Cárdenas (Portugal) Rui Soares (Czech Republic) Daniel Mekbib (Egypt) Ibrahim Elkabbani
KCC PSA Challenge Cup; Hong Kong, China; Men : Challenger 6; 24 players – $6,000 −−−−−− Women : Challenger 6; 24 players – $6,000	26–30 September	(Hong Kong) Matthew Lai; 14–12, 12–10, 8–11, 11–3 (1st PSA title)	(Malaysia) Hafiz Zhafri	(Hong Kong) Ho Ka Hei (Hong Kong) To Wai Lok	(Hong Kong) Andes Ling (Hong Kong) Harley Lam (India) Rahul Baitha (Hong Kong) Chung Yat Long
KCC PSA Challenge Cup; Hong Kong, China; Men : Challenger 6; 24 players – $6,000 −−−−−− Women : Challenger 6; 24 players – $6,000	26–30 September	(Hong Kong) Cheng Nga Ching; 12–10, 7–11, 11–9, 11–7 (4th PSA title)	(Hong Kong) Heylie Fung	(India) Akanksha Salunkhe (Hong Kong) Ena Kwong	(Hong Kong) Toby Tse (India) Rathika Seelan (Hong Kong) Elaine Chung (Malaysia) Thanusaa Uthrian
3rd Bangabandhu Squash Tournament; Dhaka, Bangladesh; Men : Challenger 6; 24 players – $6,000	26–30 September	(Egypt) Kareem El Torkey; 11–3, 10–12, 11–9, 11–9 (1st PSA title)	(Egypt) Seif Tamer	(Egypt) Hazem Hossam (Netherlands) Sebastiaan Hofman	(Egypt) Abdelrahman Abdelkhalek (Egypt) Yusuf Elsherif (Iran) Sepehr Etemadpoor (Egypt) Abdul-Rahman Elnady
South Western Open; Houston, United States; Women : World Tour Gold; 24 players – $110,000	27 Sep. – 1 Oct.	(Egypt) Nour El Tayeb; 9–11, 11–7, 11–5, 11–5 (14th PSA title)	(United States) Amanda Sobhy	(Egypt) Nada Abbas (Egypt) Salma Hany	(Egypt) Farida Mohamed (United States) Olivia Fiechter (France) Mélissa Alves (Wales) Emily Whitlock
Copa México Temazcal; Lomas de Cocoyoc, Mexico; Men : Challenger 6; 24 players – $6,000	27 Sep. – 1 Oct.	(Mexico) Alfredo Ávila; 7–11, 11–3, 11–5, 11–5 (21st PSA title)	(Colombia) Ronald Palomino	(Mexico) Jorge Gómez (Mexico) Alejandro Reyes	(Mexico) Edgar Zayas (Mexico) Carlos Vargas (Colombia) Juan Pablo Gómez (Mexico) Leo Vargas

=== October ===
Tournament	Date	Champion	Runner-Up	Semifinalists	Quarterfinalists
Wye Valley Brewery Stourbridge Open; Stourbridge, England; Men : Challenger 3; 16 players – $3,000	6–8 October	(England) Jonah Bryant; 11–7, 12–10, 11–7 (1st PSA title)	(England) Stuart MacGregor	(Wales) Elliott Morris Devred (England) Jared Carter	(England) Lewis Doughty (England) Noah Meredith (England) Jordan Hardwick (Wales) Rhys Evans
U.S. Open; Philadelphia, United States; Men : World Tour Platinum; 48 players – $196,500 −−−−−− Women : World Tour Platinum; 48 players – $196,500	7–14 October	(New Zealand) Paul Coll; 11–7, 11–7, 8–11, 8–11, 12–10 (21st PSA title)	(Egypt) Ali Farag	(Peru) Diego Elías (Egypt) Tarek Momen	(Egypt) Mazen Hesham (England) Mohamed El Shorbagy (Colombia) Miguel Á Rodríguez (England) Marwan El Shorbagy
U.S. Open; Philadelphia, United States; Men : World Tour Platinum; 48 players – $196,500 −−−−−− Women : World Tour Platinum; 48 players – $196,500	7–14 October	(Egypt) Nour El Sherbini; 11–6, 11–6, 11–7 (36th PSA title)	(Egypt) Hania El Hammamy	(United States) Olivia Fiechter (United States) Amanda Sobhy	(Egypt) Amina Orfi (England) Georgina Kennedy (Egypt) Nour El Tayeb (Belgium) Nele Gilis
QSF No.3; Doha, Qatar; Men : Challenger 30; 24 players – $30,000	11–15 October	(Qatar) Abdulla Al-Tamimi; 9–11, 11–9, 11–3, 8–11, 13–11 (8th PSA title)	(Malaysia) Eain Yow	(France) Sébastien Bonmalais (India) Velavan Senthilkumar	(Egypt) Zahed Salem (England) Perry Malik (France) Toufik Mekhalfi (Egypt) Aly Hussein
Georgia Open; Sandy Springs, United States; Men : Challenger 12; 24 players – $12,000	11–15 October	(Colombia) Juan Camilo Vargas; 11–2, 9–11, 11–8, 11–7 (8th PSA title)	(Mexico) Alfredo Ávila	(Scotland) Rory Stewart (Malaysia) Sanjay Jeeva	(England) Finnlay Withington (Czech Republic) Viktor Byrtus (India) Veer Chotrani (Colombia) Ronald Palomino
The Hamilton Open; Lancaster, United States; Women : Challenger 20; 24 players – $20,000	16–20 October	(Egypt) Malak Khafagy; 11–7, 11–4, 11–5 (4th PSA title)	(Egypt) Haya Ali	(Ukraine) Alina Bushma (Egypt) Menna Walid	(England) Alicia Mead (Egypt) Jana Shiha (Germany) Saskia Beinhard (Egypt) Ingy Hammouda
St. Louis Open; St. Louis, United States; Men : Challenger 12; 24 players – $12,000	17–21 October	(England) Curtis Malik; 11–6, 11–6, 11–6 (8th PSA title)	(United States) Spencer Lovejoy	(Egypt) Mohamad Zakaria (Colombia) Edgar Ramírez	(United States) Jamie Ruggiero (France) Baptiste Bouin (Germany) Jan Wipperfürth (Finland) Henrik Mustonen
Grasshopper Cup; Zürich, Switzerland; Men : World Tour Gold; 24 players – $110,500 −−−−−− Women : World Tour Gold; 24 players – $110,500	17–22 October	(Egypt) Karim Abdel Gawad; 11–6, 9–11, 11–8, 11–6 (26th PSA title)	(Wales) Joel Makin	(England) Marwan El Shorbagy (France) Baptiste Masotti	(England) Mohamed El Shorbagy (Egypt) Mostafa Asal (Switzerland) Nicolas Müller (Egypt) Youssef Ibrahim
Grasshopper Cup; Zürich, Switzerland; Men : World Tour Gold; 24 players – $110,500 −−−−−− Women : World Tour Gold; 24 players – $110,500	17–22 October	(Egypt) Nour El Sherbini; 11–6, 11–7, 11–9 (37th PSA title)	(Egypt) Hania El Hammamy	(Belgium) Nele Gilis (England) Georgina Kennedy	(Egypt) Rowan Elaraby (United States) Sabrina Sobhy (Japan) Satomi Watanabe (England) Sarah-Jane Perry
Life Time Chicago Open; Vernon Hills, United States; Men : Challenger 30; 24 players - $30,000	18–22 October	(Egypt) Mohamed ElSherbini; 10–12, 11–8, 11–5, 11–7 (11th PSA title)	(Egypt) Aly Abou Eleinen	(England) Tom Walsh (Egypt) Aly Hussein	(United States) Faraz Khan (Israel) Daniel Poleshchuk (Egypt) Mazen Gamal (Mexico) César Salazar
Greenwich Open; Greenwich, United States; Men : Challenger 9; 24 players – $9,000 −−−−−− Women : Challenger 9; 24 players – $9,000	18–22 October	(India) Veer Chotrani; 11–8, 11–5, 10–12, 6–11, 11–3 (2nd PSA title)	(Egypt) Seif Shenawy	(Netherlands) Rowan Damming (Ecuador) David Costales	(Pakistan) Ashab Irfan (England) Finnlay Withington (Egypt) Mohamed Sharaf (Wales) Emyr Evans
Greenwich Open; Greenwich, United States; Men : Challenger 9; 24 players – $9,000 −−−−−− Women : Challenger 9; 24 players – $9,000	18–22 October	(Malaysia) Yee Xin Ying; 4–11, 11–5, 11–9, 11–9 (2nd PSA title)	(Egypt) Menna Hamed	(India) Akanksha Salunkhe (United States) Caroline Fouts	(Republic of Ireland) Hannah Craig (Malaysia) Wen Li Lai (Malaysia) Heng Wai Wong (Malaysia) Vanessa Raj
La Classique de Gatineau; Gatineau, Canada; Men : Challenger 3; 24 players – $3,000	19–22 October	(Canada) Salah Eltorgman; 11–7, 11–8, 11–3 (1st PSA title)	(Canada) Elliott Hunt	(Canada) Amin Khan (Canada) Blake Reinson	(Canada) Jayden Shortt (Canada) Mitchell Kahnert (Canada) Maximilien Godbout (Canada) Suddesh Kannah
QSF No.4; Doha, Qatar; Men : World Tour Bronze; 24 players – $50,000	23–27 October	(Qatar) Abdulla Al-Tamimi; 7–11, 11–3, 12–10, 6–11, 12–10 (9th PSA title)	(Egypt) Tarek Momen	(France) Victor Crouin (Egypt) Fares Dessouky	(Germany) Raphael Kandra (Hungary) Balázs Farkas (Egypt) Omar Mosaad (Switzerland) Dimitri Steinmann
3rd Open de Lagord; Lagord, France; Men : Challenger 30; 24 players – $30,000	24–28 October	(France) Baptiste Masotti; 9–11, 11–5, 11–6, 7–11, 11–8 (6th PSA title)	(Scotland) Greg Lobban	(Malaysia) Ivan Yuen (England) George Parker	(France) Lucas Serme (France) Toufik Mekhalfi (England) Declan James (Malaysia) Mohd Syafiq Kamal
1er Open PSA Féminin de Couzeix/Limoges (France) Couzeix, France; Women: Challenger 6; 24 players – $6,000	24–28 October	(England) Torrie Malik; 11–7, 7–11, 17–15, 16–14 (7th PSA title)	(Spain) Marta Domínguez	(Egypt) Hana Ismail (France) Lauren Baltayan	(New Zealand) Kaitlyn Watts (Singapore) Wai Yhann Au Yeong (France) Élise Romba (Spain) Sofía Mateos
Local World LA Open; Los Angeles, United States; Men : Challenger 15; 24 players – $15,000	25–29 October	(Egypt) Mohamad Zakaria; 6–11, 7–11, 11–1, 11–8, 11–1 (1st PSA title)	(United States) Andrew Douglas	(Israel) Daniel Poleshchuk (Colombia) Matías Knudsen	(Colombia) Edgar Ramírez (Canada) Salah Eltorgman (Mexico) Sebastián Salazar (Egypt) Omar Elkattan
PVD Rhode Island Open; Providence, United States; Men : Challenger 12; 24 players – $12,000	25–29 October	(India) Veer Chotrani; 11–6, 11–9, 11–5 (3rd PSA title)	(Australia) Joseph White	(Republic of Ireland) Sam Buckley (Mexico) Alfredo Ávila	(United States) Christopher Gordon (Pakistan) Ashab Irfan (Ecuador) David Costales (United States) Spencer Lovejoy
Logan City Queensland Open; Daisy Hill, Australia; Men : Challenger 6; 24 players - $6,000 −−−−−− Women : Challenger 6; 24 players - $6,000	25–29 October	(Australia) Rhys Dowling; 12–10, 11–6, 11–4 (5th PSA title)	(Malaysia) Ong Sai Hung	(Malaysia) Bryan Lim (Australia) Nicholas Calvert	(Australia) Brendan MacDonald (Japan) Naoki Hayashi (Japan) Tomotaka Endo (Australia) David Turner
Logan City Queensland Open; Daisy Hill, Australia; Men : Challenger 6; 24 players - $6,000 −−−−−− Women : Challenger 6; 24 players - $6,000	25–29 October	(Australia) Jessica Turnbull; 8–11, 11–8, 11–5, 11–0 (7th PSA title)	(South Korea) Heo Min-gyeong	(Malaysia) Sehveetrraa Kumar (Australia) Sarah Cardwell	(Malta) Colette Sultana (Japan) Erisa Sano (Australia) Sophie Fadaely (Australia) Madison Lyon
Swiss Open; Uster, Switzerland; Men : Challenger 6; 16 players – $6,000 −−−−−− Women : Challenger 6; 24 players – $6,000	25–29 October	(Switzerland) Yannick Wilhelmi; 11–13, 11–7, 11–9, 11–9 (4th PSA title)	(Switzerland) Robin Gadola	(Switzerland) David Bernet (Switzerland) Miguel Mathis	(Switzerland) Nils Rösch (Switzerland) Louai Hafez (Austria) Lukas Windischberger (Switzerland) Sven Stettler
Swiss Open; Uster, Switzerland; Men : Challenger 6; 16 players – $6,000 −−−−−− Women : Challenger 6; 24 players – $6,000	25–29 October	(Egypt) Amina El Rihany; 11–5, 9–11, 11–8, 11–6 (1st PSA title)	(England) Asia Harris	(Scotland) Alison Thomson (Switzerland) Ambre Allinckx	(Denmark) Klara Møller (Switzerland) Céline Walser (England) Kiera Marshall (Egypt) Ingy Hammouda
Oban Open; Oban, Scotland; Men : Challenger 3; 24 players – $3,000	27–29 October	(England) Stuart MacGregor; 11–3, 11–6, 11–7 (2nd PSA title)	(England) Noah Meredith	(Scotland) John Meehan (Isle of Man) Nathan Mead	(Republic of Ireland) Conor Moran (England) Jordan Warne (England) Jared Carter (Scotland) Rory Richmond
Burnt Squash Open; Lakeville, United States; Men : Challenger 6; 24 players – $6,000 −−−−−− Women : Challenger 6; 24 players – $6,000	26–30 October	(Egypt) Abdelrahman Nassar; 12–10, 11–8, 11–5 (1st PSA title)	(Pakistan) Ahsan Ayaz	(Pakistan) Abdul Malik Khan (Nigeria) Babatunde Ajagbe	(Egypt) Mohamed Sharaf (Canada) Syan Singh (United States) Dylan Kachur (Pakistan) Farhan Hashmi
Burnt Squash Open; Lakeville, United States; Men : Challenger 6; 24 players – $6,000 −−−−−− Women : Challenger 6; 24 players – $6,000	26–30 October	(Malaysia) Yee Xin Ying; 9–11, 7–11, 11–8, 11–8, 11–7 (3rd PSA title)	(Egypt) Malak Taha	(United States) Caroline Fouts (Ukraine) Alina Bushma	(Republic of Ireland) Hannah Craig (Malaysia) Vanessa Raj (United States) Olivia Choo (Brazil) Bruna Marchesi
The SA Open; Sandton, South Africa; Men : Challenger 15; 24 players - $15,000 −−−−−− Women : Challenger 20; 24 players - $20,000	29 Oct. – 2 Nov.	(Egypt) Ibrahim Elkabbani; 11–8, 11–8, 11–6 (5th PSA title)	(England) Ben Smith	(South Africa) Dewald van Niekerk (Netherlands) Rowan Damming	(Egypt) Khaled Labib (Egypt) Seif Tamer (Egypt) Ziad Ibrahim (Egypt) Hazem Hossam
The SA Open; Sandton, South Africa; Men : Challenger 15; 24 players - $15,000 −−−−−− Women : Challenger 20; 24 players - $20,000	29 Oct. – 2 Nov.	(England) Jasmine Hutton; 11–6, 13–11, 11–5 (7th PSA title)	(England) Lucy Turmel	(Egypt) Nour Heikal (Egypt) Nour Aboulmakarim	(France) Marie Stephan (Egypt) Menna Hamed (South Africa) Alexandra Fuller (Switzerland) Cindy Merlo
Oregon Open; Portland, United States; Men : Challenger 15; 24 players - $15,000	31 Oct. – 4 Nov.	(Wales) Emyr Evans; 11–8, 11–9, 12–10 (2nd PSA title)	(United States) Spencer Lovejoy	(Pakistan) Ashab Irfan (United States) Faraz Khan	(Colombia) Edgar Ramírez (United States) Dillon Huang (Canada) Salah Eltorgman (New Zealand) Anthony Lepper

=== November ===
Tournament	Date	Champion	Runner-Up	Semifinalists	Quarterfinalists
PSA Bordeaux–Gradignan; Gradignan, France; Men : Challenger 12; 24 players - $12,000	1–5 November	(England) Curtis Malik; 11–4, 11–7, 11–8 (9th PSA title)	(Egypt) Mazen Gamal	(France) Edwin Clain (France) Brice Nicolas	(Spain) Iván Pérez (France) Joshua Phinéra (Kuwait) Ammar Al-Tamimi (France) Macéo Lévy
Czech Open; Brno, Czech Republic; Men : Challenger 30; 24 players – $30,000 −−−−−− Women : Challenger 9; 24 players – $9,000	2–6 November	(England) Patrick Rooney; 11–4, 9–11, 11–6, 6–11, 11–6 (5th PSA title)	(Germany) Raphael Kandra	(Egypt) Yahya Elnawasany (Switzerland) Nicolas Müller	(France) Lucas Serme (England) Declan James (Hungary) Balázs Farkas (Portugal) Rui Soares
Czech Open; Brno, Czech Republic; Men : Challenger 30; 24 players – $30,000 −−−−−− Women : Challenger 9; 24 players – $9,000	2–6 November	(Egypt) Haya Ali; 6–11, 11–6, 11–7, 13–11 (3rd PSA title)	(England) Asia Harris	(Netherlands) Tessa ter Sluis (Poland) Sofi Zrazhevska	(France) Lauren Baltayan (France) Léa Barbeau (Scotland) Alison Thomson (Wales) Ali Loke
ACE Malaysia Squash Cup; Seremban, Malaysia; Men : World Tour Bronze; 24 players – $51,500 −−−−−− Women : World Tour Bronze; 24 players – $51,500	6–10 November	(Egypt) Karim Abdel Gawad; 11–8, 12–10, 11–5 (27th PSA title)	(Egypt) Mostafa Asal	(Malaysia) Eain Yow (India) Ramit Tandon	(France) Victor Crouin (Switzerland) Dimitri Steinmann (France) Sébastien Bonmalais (India) Saurav Ghosal
ACE Malaysia Squash Cup; Seremban, Malaysia; Men : World Tour Bronze; 24 players – $51,500 −−−−−− Women : World Tour Bronze; 24 players – $51,500	6–10 November	(Egypt) Nour El Tayeb; 11–2, 11–4, 11–4 (15th PSA title)	(Malaysia) Rachel Arnold	(Egypt) Malak Khafagy (Malaysia) Sivasangari Subramaniam	(Egypt) Kenzy Ayman (Egypt) Farida Mohamed (Hong Kong) Lee Ka Yi (Egypt) Amina Orfi
Monte Carlo Classic; Fontvieille, Monaco; Women : Challenger 20; 24 players – $20,000	6–10 November	(England) Lucy Turmel w/o (6th PSA title)	(Wales) Emily Whitlock	(Scotland) Georgia Adderley (Egypt) Hana Moataz	(France) Énora Villard (England) Grace Gear (England) Millie Tomlinson (Egypt) Mariam Metwally
Open International Niort-Venise Verte; Bessines, France; Men : Challenger 20; 24 players – $20,000	7–11 November	(Spain) Iker Pajares; 11–6, 11–5, 11–5 (11th PSA title)	(Scotland) Rory Stewart	(Egypt) Mazen Gamal (India) Abhay Singh	(Czech Republic) Viktor Byrtus (Israel) Daniel Poleshchuk (Egypt) Mohamed Nasser (New Zealand) Lwamba Chileshe
SACC Costa Rica Open; Pozos, Costa Rica; Men : Challenger 12; 16 players – $12,000 −−−−−− Women : Challenger 12; 16 players – $12,000	8–11 November	(Guatemala) Alejandro Enríquez; 11–8, 11–8, 11–6 (3rd PSA title)	(Malaysia) Sanjay Jeeva	(Argentina) Jeremías Azaña (Guatemala) Josué Enríquez	(New Zealand) Anthony Lepper (Netherlands) Rowan Damming (Mexico) Alfredo López (Guatemala) Luis Quisquinay
SACC Costa Rica Open; Pozos, Costa Rica; Men : Challenger 12; 16 players – $12,000 −−−−−− Women : Challenger 12; 16 players – $12,000	8–11 November	(Egypt) Habiba Hani; 11–5, 11–5, 11–9 (1st PSA title)	(Republic of Ireland) Hannah Craig	(Australia) Alex Haydon (United States) Caroline Fouts	(England) Torrie Malik (Latvia) Ineta Mackeviča (Guatemala) Winifer Bonilla (Guatemala) Darlyn Sandoval
RGSA Open; São Caetano do Sul, Brazil; Men : Challenger 6; 24 players – $6,000	8–11 November	(Brazil) Diego Gobbi; 11–6, 5–11, 11–9, 11–6 (2nd PSA title)	(Paraguay) Francesco Marcantonio	(Brazil) Pedro Mometto (France) Macéo Lévy	(Brazil) Rhuan Sousa (France) Titouan Isambard (Chile) Lucas Pérez (Brazil) Vinicius Berbel
Richardson Wealth Van Lawn Open; Vancouver, Canada; Men : Challenger 15; 24 players – $15,000	8–12 November	(United States) Faraz Khan; 11–13, 11–9, 11–5, 11–9 (5th PSA title)	(England) Nathan Lake	(Canada) Salah Eltorgman (Mexico) Jorge Gómez	(United States) Dillon Huang (England) Perry Malik (Hong Kong) Chung Yat Long (Mexico) Sebastián Salazar
Cognac Open; Châteaubernard, France; Men : Challenger 12; 24 players – $12,000	12–16 November	(Israel) Daniel Poleshchuk; 13–15, 11–9, 11–6, 11–8 (8th PSA title)	(Czech Republic) Jakub Solnický	(Egypt) Mohamed Nasser (Hong Kong) Matthew Lai	(France) Brice Nicolas (France) Melvil Scianimanico (England) Robert Downer (Egypt) Khaled Labib
Grizzly Bear Bourbon Mile High 360 Classic; Denver, United States; Men : Challenger 15; 24 players – $15,000	14–18 November	(United States) Andrew Douglas; 9–11, 11–9, 12–10, 11–7 (4th PSA title)	(United States) Faraz Khan	(Mexico) César Salazar (Hong Kong) Wong Chi Him	(Pakistan) Ashab Irfan (Egypt) Kareem El Torkey (Argentina) Jeremías Azaña (Egypt) Ziad Sakr
VITAGEN Singapore Squash Open; Kallang, Singapore; Men : World Tour Gold; 24 players – $112,500 −−−−−− Women : World Tour Gold; 24 players – $112,500	14–19 November	(Egypt) Ali Farag; 6–11, 11–4, 14–12, 11–8 (36th PSA title)	(Peru) Diego Elías	(Egypt) Mostafa Asal (England) Marwan El Shorbagy	(England) Mohamed El Shorbagy (New Zealand) Paul Coll (Egypt) Fares Dessouky (Egypt) Youssef Soliman
VITAGEN Singapore Squash Open; Kallang, Singapore; Men : World Tour Gold; 24 players – $112,500 −−−−−− Women : World Tour Gold; 24 players – $112,500	14–19 November	(Belgium) Nele Gilis; 11–6, 12–10, 8–11, 5–11, 11–4 (11th PSA title)	(Belgium) Tinne Gilis	(England) Georgina Kennedy (England) Sarah-Jane Perry	(Malaysia) Sivasangari Subramaniam (United States) Sabrina Sobhy (Egypt) Rowan Elaraby (Egypt) Salma Hany
London Open; Camden, England; Men : Challenger 20; 24 players – $20,000 −−−−−− Women : Challenger 15; 24 players – $15,000	15–19 November	(England) Adrian Waller; 11–6, 11–6, 5–11, 11–9 (11th PSA title)	(England) Simon Herbert	(Wales) Owain Taylor (Portugal) Rui Soares	(Pakistan) Hamza Khan (Wales) Emyr Evans (Malaysia) Mohd Syafiq Kamal (England) Ben Coleman
London Open; Camden, England; Men : Challenger 20; 24 players – $20,000 −−−−−− Women : Challenger 15; 24 players – $15,000	15–19 November	(England) Alicia Mead; 7–11, 11–8, 5–11, 11–9, 11–4 (4th PSA title)	(Egypt) Malak Khafagy	(England) Asia Harris (Egypt) Rana Ismail	(England) Torrie Malik (England) Grace Gear (France) Énora Villard (New Zealand) Kaitlyn Watts
Underhill Geomatics Sport Central Open; Richmond, Canada; Men : Challenger 9; 24 players – $9,000	15–19 November	(Canada) Salah Eltorgman; 12–10, 8–11, 10–12, 11–9, 11–7 (2nd PSA title)	(England) Perry Malik	(Canada) Liam Marrison (Mexico) Alfredo Ávila	(Mexico) Alejandro Reyes (Hong Kong) To Wai Lok (Mexico) Jorge Gómez (Mexico) Sebastián Salazar
Bondi Open; Bondi Junction, Australia; Men : Challenger 6; 24 players – $6,000 −−−−−− Women : Challenger 6; 16 players – $6,000	15–19 November	(Malaysia) Bryan Lim; 11–9, 11–6, 11–1 (4th PSA title)	(Malaysia) Hafiz Zhafri	(Australia) Nicholas Calvert (Sri Lanka) Ravindu Laksiri	(Australia) Bradley Fullick (Australia) David Turner (Australia) Brendan MacDonald (Malta) Kijan Sultana
Bondi Open; Bondi Junction, Australia; Men : Challenger 6; 24 players – $6,000 −−−−−− Women : Challenger 6; 16 players – $6,000	15–19 November	(Malaysia) Sehveetrraa Kumar; 7–11, 11–9, 11–2, 9–11, 11–6 (1st PSA title)	(Malaysia) Thanusaa Uthrian	(Malta) Colette Sultana (Australia) Sarah Cardwell	(Australia) Sophie Fadaely (Australia) Lee Sze Yu (Australia) Pascale Louka (Pakistan) Noor-ul-Huda
Curitiba Squash Center Brazil Open; Curitiba, Brazil; Men : Challenger 3; 24 players – $3,000	15–19 November	(Brazil) Pedro Mometto; 11–7, 6–11, 12–10, 3–11, 11–9 (1st PSA title)	(Paraguay) Francesco Marcantonio	(Brazil) Diego Gobbi (Brazil) Rhuan Sousa	(Chile) Matías Lacroix (Brazil) Vinicius Berbel (France) Titouan Isambard (Brazil) Gustavo Pizatto
Telsa Media David Lloyd Purley Open; Croydon, England; Men : Challenger 3; 16 players – $3,000 −−−−−− Women : Challenger 3; 16 players – $3,000	17–19 November	(England) Jonah Bryant; 11–1, 11–5, 11–7 (2nd PSA title)	(England) Robert Downer	(England) Will Salter (England) Jack Mitterer	(England) Michael Andrews (England) Noah Meredith (England) Aaron Allpress (England) Jordan Warne
Telsa Media David Lloyd Purley Open; Croydon, England; Men : Challenger 3; 16 players – $3,000 −−−−−− Women : Challenger 3; 16 players – $3,000	17–19 November	(Scotland) Alison Thomson; 11–8, 5–11, 14–12, 12–10 (4th PSA title)	(England) Amelie Haworth	(Egypt) Hana Ismail (Republic of Ireland) Breanne Flynn	(England) Polly Clark (Scotland) Katriona Allen (England) Jasmin Kalar (Netherlands) Sanne Veldkamp
Hong Kong Football Club Open; Hong Kong, China; Men : World Tour Bronze; 24 players – $55,000 −−−−−− Women : World Tour Bronze; 24 players – $55,000	21–25 November	(Egypt) Aly Abou Eleinen; 11–6, 5–11, 11–7, 11–7 (3rd PSA title)	(Malaysia) Eain Yow	(Egypt) Mohamed ElSherbini (Spain) Iker Pajares	(Hong Kong) Henry Leung (England) Nathan Lake (France) Grégoire Marche (Hong Kong) Alex Lau
Hong Kong Football Club Open; Hong Kong, China; Men : World Tour Bronze; 24 players – $55,000 −−−−−− Women : World Tour Bronze; 24 players – $55,000	21–25 November	(Malaysia) Sivasangari Subramaniam; 11–9, 11–8, 11–5 (13th PSA title)	(Egypt) Amina Orfi	(England) Georgina Kennedy (England) Sarah-Jane Perry	(France) Mélissa Alves (United States) Sabrina Sobhy (Malaysia) Rachel Arnold (Hong Kong) Tomato Ho
Madeira International; Caniço, Portugal; Men : Challenger 15; 24 players – $15,000 −−−−−− Women : Challenger 6; 16 players – $6,000	22–26 November	(Egypt) Moustafa El Sirty; 11–4, 7–11, 11–7, 11–9 (14th PSA title)	(Portugal) Rui Soares	(Egypt) Mazen Gamal (England) Ben Smith	(Malaysia) Mohd Syafiq Kamal (Switzerland) Robin Gadola (Spain) Bernat Jaume (New Zealand) Lwamba Chileshe
Madeira International; Caniço, Portugal; Men : Challenger 15; 24 players – $15,000 −−−−−− Women : Challenger 6; 16 players – $6,000	22–26 November	(Egypt) Rana Ismail; 11–6, 11–9, 6–11, 11–3 (2nd PSA title)	(Malaysia) Chan Yiwen	(Austria) Jacqueline Peychär (Netherlands) Tessa ter Sluis	(United States) Riya Navani (Germany) Katerina Týcová (Egypt) Amina El Rihany (England) Isabel McCullough
The Northern Joe Cup; Manchester, England; Men : Challenger 9; 24 players – $9,000 −−−−−− Women : Challenger 9; 24 players – $9,000	22–26 November	(Egypt) Mohamad Zakaria; 14–12, 12–10, 10–12, 11–4 (2nd PSA title)	(France) Toufik Mekhalfi	(Wales) Emyr Evans (South Africa) Dewald van Niekerk	(England) Finnlay Withington (Pakistan) Noor Zaman (Wales) Owain Taylor (England) Abdallah Eissa
The Northern Joe Cup; Manchester, England; Men : Challenger 9; 24 players – $9,000 −−−−−− Women : Challenger 9; 24 players – $9,000	22–26 November	(England) Torrie Malik; 11–4, 11–7, 11–6 (8th PSA title)	(England) Saran Nghiem	(Egypt) Nour Megahed (Malaysia) Yasshmita Jadishkumar	(Wales) Ali Loke (Egypt) Hana Ismail (Egypt) Menna Walid (Wales) Lowri Roberts
BKY Technologies Open; Edmonton, Canada; Men : Challenger 9; 24 players – $9,000	22–26 November	(Canada) Salah Eltorgman; 11–5, 11–9, 9–11, 13–11 (3rd PSA title)	(Egypt) Abdelrahman Nassar	(England) Perry Malik (Hong Kong) Chung Yat Long	(Hong Kong) To Wai Lok (Hong Kong) Ho Ka Hei (France) Brice Nicolas (France) Laszlo Godde
Les Elles de l'Est; Maxéville, France; Women : Challenger 6; 24 players – $6,000	22–26 November	(Egypt) Nadien Elhammamy; 11–5, 11–3, 3–11, 6–11, 11–8 (1st PSA title)	(France) Lauren Baltayan	(Egypt) Jana Swaify (England) Kiera Marshall	(England) Polly Clark (France) Kara Lincou (France) Élise Romba (Denmark) Klara Møller
NextCloud Tekae TIPSSA Open; Mexico City, Mexico; Men : Challenger 6; 24 players – $6,000	22–26 November	(Mexico) Jorge Gómez; 11–5, 11–3, 11–2 (1st PSA title)	(Mexico) Sebastián Salazar	(Mexico) Alejandro Reyes (Mexico) Leo Vargas	(Mexico) Allan Núñez (Mexico) César Segundo (Guatemala) Luis Quisquinay (Mexico) Carlos Vargas
II Abierto Colombiano; La Calera, Colombia; Men : Challenger 3; 16 players – $3,000	23–26 November	(Colombia) Ronald Palomino; 11–6, 9–11, 11–3, 11–4 (4th PSA title)	(Colombia) José Santamaría	(Colombia) Sebastián Rodríguez (Colombia) Edgar Ramírez	(Colombia) Felipe Tovar (Colombia) Juan José Torres (Colombia) Alejandro Martínez (Colombia) Alfonso Marroquín
Aston & Fincher Sutton Coldfield International; Sutton Coldfield, England; Men : Challenger 6; 24 players – $6,000 −−−−−− Women : Challenger 6; 24 players – $6,000	28 Nov. – 2 Dec.	(Egypt) Mohamad Zakaria; 8–11, 11–9, 11–4, 11–6 (3rd PSA title)	(England) Stuart MacGregor	(New Zealand) Joel Arscott (England) Jonah Bryant	(England) James Peach (Wales) Rhys Evans (Poland) Jakub Pytlowany (Pakistan) Hamza Khan
Aston & Fincher Sutton Coldfield International; Sutton Coldfield, England; Men : Challenger 6; 24 players – $6,000 −−−−−− Women : Challenger 6; 24 players – $6,000	28 Nov. – 2 Dec.	(Egypt) Nour Megahed; 11–4, 11–7, 4–11, 11–4 (2nd PSA title)	(Scotland) Alison Thomson	(Egypt) Menna Walid (England) Asia Harris	(Egypt) Hana Ismail (England) Kiera Marshall (Wales) Lowri Roberts (Singapore) Wai Yhann Au Yeong
TTI Milwaukee HK Open; Hong Kong, China; Men : World Tour Platinum; 48 players - $190,000 −−−−−− Women : World Tour Platinum; 48 players - $190,000	27 Nov. – 3 Dec.	(New Zealand) Paul Coll; 10–12, 11–3, 11–8, 8–11, 11–9 (22nd PSA title)	(Egypt) Ali Farag	(England) Mohamed El Shorbagy (Egypt) Mostafa Asal	(England) Marwan El Shorbagy (Egypt) Mazen Hesham (Peru) Diego Elías (Egypt) Tarek Momen
TTI Milwaukee HK Open; Hong Kong, China; Men : World Tour Platinum; 48 players - $190,000 −−−−−− Women : World Tour Platinum; 48 players - $190,000	27 Nov. – 3 Dec.	(Egypt) Hania El Hammamy; 6–5^{rtd.} (13th PSA title)	(United States) Amanda Sobhy	(Egypt) Nour El Sherbini (Belgium) Nele Gilis	(Belgium) Tinne Gilis (Malaysia) Sivasangari Subramaniam (Japan) Satomi Watanabe (Egypt) Rowan Elaraby
PSA des Hauts-de-France; Wambrechies, France; Men : Challenger 15; 24 players – $15,000	29 Nov. – 3 Dec.	(Spain) Bernat Jaume; 11–4, 11–9, 6–11, 11–5 (7th PSA title)	(England) Declan James	(Egypt) Moustafa El Sirty (France) Brice Nicolas	(Germany) Yannik Omlor (Colombia) Juan Camilo Vargas (Germany) Valentin Rapp (France) Melvil Scianimanico
CAS Serena Hotels International; Islamabad, Pakistan; Men : Challenger 12; 24 players – $12,000 −−−−−− Women : Challenger 6; 24 players – $6,000	30 Nov. – 4 Dec.	(Pakistan) Noor Zaman; 11–8, 8–2^{rtd.} (1st PSA title)	(Pakistan) Asim Khan	(Egypt) Ibrahim Elkabbani (Pakistan) Nasir Iqbal	(Egypt) Mohamed Nasser (Pakistan) Amaad Fareed (Egypt) Khaled Labib (Malaysia) Ong Sai Hung
CAS Serena Hotels International; Islamabad, Pakistan; Men : Challenger 12; 24 players – $12,000 −−−−−− Women : Challenger 6; 24 players – $6,000	30 Nov. – 4 Dec.	(Egypt) Amina El Rihany; 13–15, 11–3, 11–7, 11–7 (2nd PSA title)	(Egypt) Nadien Elhammamy	(Egypt) Nour Khafagy (Egypt) Nour Ramy	(Malaysia) Chan Yiwen (Hong Kong) Kirstie Wong (Egypt) Malak Samir (Pakistan) Sana Bahadar

=== December ===
Tournament	Date	Champion	Runner-Up	Semifinalists	Quarterfinalists
Harrogate Squash Open; Harrogate, England; Men : Challenger 3; 24 players – $3,000 −−−−−− Women : Challenger 3; 24 players – $3,000	6–9 December	(England) Jonah Bryant; 6–11, 11–3, 11–4, 11–3 (3rd PSA title)	(England) Jared Carter	(England) Chris Simpson (New Zealand) Joel Arscott	(Scotland) Martin Ross (Scotland) Andrew Glen (Scotland) Rory Richmond (Scotland) John Meehan
Harrogate Squash Open; Harrogate, England; Men : Challenger 3; 24 players – $3,000 −−−−−− Women : Challenger 3; 24 players – $3,000	6–9 December	(England) Asia Harris; 11–5, 10–12, 11–7, 13–15, 13–11 (3rd PSA title)	(England) Kiera Marshall	(Egypt) Nour Megahed (Scotland) Ellie Jones	(England) Amelie Haworth (Scotland) Katriona Allen (England) Polly Clark (South Africa) Hayley Ward
Lucino Vanities/Barfoot & Thompson NZ Open; Mount Maunganui, New Zealand; Men : World Tour Silver; 24 players – $77,500 −−−−−− Women : World Tour Silver; 24 players – $77,500	5–10 December	(New Zealand) Paul Coll; 11–6, 11–6, 11–6 (23rd PSA title)	(England) Marwan El Shorbagy	(Wales) Joel Makin (France) Victor Crouin	(England) Patrick Rooney (France) Baptiste Masotti (France) Grégoire Marche (France) Auguste Dussourd
Lucino Vanities/Barfoot & Thompson NZ Open; Mount Maunganui, New Zealand; Men : World Tour Silver; 24 players – $77,500 −−−−−− Women : World Tour Silver; 24 players – $77,500	5–10 December	(Belgium) Nele Gilis; 11–8, 11–3, 11–8 (12th PSA title)	(Belgium) Tinne Gilis	(Malaysia) Aifa Azman (Wales) Tesni Evans	(England) Lucy Beecroft (Hong Kong) Tomato Ho (Hong Kong) Tong Tsz Wing (Hong Kong) Lee Ka Yi
Liechtenstein Open; Vaduz, Liechtenstein; Men : Challenger 3; 16 players - $3,000	8–10 December	(Austria) Aqeel Rehman; 11–5, 13–11, 11–5 (14th PSA title)	(Switzerland) David Bernet	(Switzerland) Miguel Mathis (Switzerland) Joel Siewerdt	(Liechtenstein) David Maier (Austria) Lukas Windischberger (Switzerland) Nils Rösch (Switzerland) Sven Stettler
QSF No.5; Doha, Qatar; Men : Challenger 30; 24 players – $30,000	10–14 December	(Qatar) Abdulla Al-Tamimi; 11–5, 12–10, 8–11, 11–9 (10th PSA title)	(Colombia) Juan Camilo Vargas	(England) George Parker (Egypt) Karim El Hammamy	(Egypt) Aly Hussein (England) Simon Herbert (Egypt) Seif Shenawy (England) Finnlay Withington
The St. James Open; Springfield, United States; Women : Challenger 15; 24 players – $15,000	13–17 December	(United States) Marina Stefanoni; 11–8, 11–6, 11–2 (8th PSA title)	(England) Torrie Malik	(Egypt) Haya Ali (Canada) Danielle Ray	(India) Akanksha Salunkhe (France) Élise Romba (Republic of Ireland) Hannah Craig (Egypt) Rana Ismail
QSF No.6; Doha, Qatar; Men : Challenger 3; 16 players – $3,000	18–21 December	(Kuwait) Ammar Al-Tamimi; 11–2, 11–3, 11–4 (2nd PSA title)	(Qatar) Waleed Zaman	(Iran) Sepehr Etemadpoor (Kuwait) Mohammad Almasoud	(Qatar) Yousef Farag (Qatar) Salem Al-Malki (Bahrain) Yousif Thani (Kuwait) Athbi Hamad
JSW Sunil Verma Memorial Open; Vasind, India; Men : Challenger 3; 24 players – $3,000 −−−−−− Women : Challenger 3; 16 players – $3,000	19–23 December	(India) Rahul Baitha; 6–11, 8–11, 12–10, 11–8, 11–8 (1st PSA title)	(Sri Lanka) Ravindu Laksiri	(India) Suraj Chand (India) Sandeep Jangra	(India) Vaibhav Chauhan (India) K. S. Arihant (India) Kunal Singh (India) Jamal Sakib
JSW Sunil Verma Memorial Open; Vasind, India; Men : Challenger 3; 24 players – $3,000 −−−−−− Women : Challenger 3; 16 players – $3,000	19–23 December	(India) Pooja Arthi; 11–6, 7–11, 12–10, 11–1 (1st PSA title)	(India) Sunita Patel	(India) Nirupama Dubey (India) Unnati Tripathi	(India) Akanksha Gupta (India) Shameena Riaz (India) Vasudha Surange (Botswana) Leungo Katse
SODIC Squash Open; Sheikh Zayed City, Egypt; Men : Challenger 3; 24 players – $3,000 −−−−−− Women : Challenger 3; 24 players – $3,000	21–24 December	(Egypt) Kareem El Torkey; 11–3, 11–2, 11–5 (2nd PSA title)	(Egypt) Yassin Shohdy	(Egypt) Ziad Ibrahim (Egypt) Marwan Tamer	(Egypt) Abdelrahman Abdelkhalek (Egypt) Omar Azzam (Egypt) Seif Tamer (Egypt) Sohail El Shenawy
SODIC Squash Open; Sheikh Zayed City, Egypt; Men : Challenger 3; 24 players – $3,000 −−−−−− Women : Challenger 3; 24 players – $3,000	21–24 December	(Egypt) Menna Walid; 11–7, 11–7, 19–21, 14–12 (3rd PSA title)	(Egypt) Nour Khafagy	(Egypt) Habiba Hossam (Egypt) Malak Fathy	(Egypt) Lojayn Gohary (Egypt) Karma Allam (Egypt) Sohaila Ismail (Egypt) Nour Megahed

=== January ===
Tournament	Date	Champion	Runner-Up	Semifinalists	Quarterfinalists
SmartCentres Kinetic Florida Open; Boynton Beach, United States; Men : World Tour Gold; 24 players – $110,750 −−−−−− Women : World Tour Gold; 24 players – $110,750	9–14 January	(Egypt) Mostafa Asal; 11–4, 9–11, 11–1, 11–1 (13th PSA title)	(Egypt) Mazen Hesham	(Peru) Diego Elías (England) Mohamed El Shorbagy	(France) Grégoire Marche (Wales) Joel Makin (Egypt) Tarek Momen (France) Sébastien Bonmalais
SmartCentres Kinetic Florida Open; Boynton Beach, United States; Men : World Tour Gold; 24 players – $110,750 −−−−−− Women : World Tour Gold; 24 players – $110,750	9–14 January	(Egypt) Nour El Sherbini; 11–5, 11–9, 11–7 (38th PSA title)	(Egypt) Hania El Hammamy	(Egypt) Nouran Gohar (United States) Olivia Weaver	(Egypt) Amina Orfi (Egypt) Farida Mohamed (Malaysia) Sivasangari Subramaniam (Hong Kong) Chan Sin Yuk
JSW Willingdon Little Masters; Mumbai, India; Men : Challenger 3; 24 players – $3,000 −−−−−− Women : Challenger 3; 16 players – $3,000	13–17 January	(India) Abhay Singh; 11–9, 11–5, 11–2 (8th PSA title)	(India) Suraj Chand	(Australia) Remi Young (India) Om Semwal	(India) Kanhav Nanavati (India) Ranvijay Sidhu (India) K. S. Arihant (India) Vedant Patel
JSW Willingdon Little Masters; Mumbai, India; Men : Challenger 3; 24 players – $3,000 −−−−−− Women : Challenger 3; 16 players – $3,000	13–17 January	(India) Anahat Singh; 11–4, 11–3, 11–7 (1st PSA title)	(Japan) Erisa Sano	(Sri Lanka) Chanithma Sinaly (India) Rathika Seelan	(India) Nirupama Dubey (Sri Lanka) Yeheni Kuruppu (Serbia) Jelena Dutina (Sri Lanka) Dewmini Gallage
HK Squash PSA Challenge Cup - 1st leg Hong Kong, China; Men : Challenger 6; 24 players - $6,000 −−−−−− Women : Challenger 6; 24 players - $6,000	16–20 January	(Hong Kong) Wong Chi Him; 11–9, 11–7, 5–11, 5–11, 3–11 (9th PSA title)	(Hong Kong) Tang Ming Hong	(Hong Kong) Leo Chung (Hong Kong) Andes Ling	(Hong Kong) Matthew Lai (Japan) Shota Yasunari (Hong Kong) Lam Shing Fung (South Korea) Ryu Jeong-min
HK Squash PSA Challenge Cup - 1st leg Hong Kong, China; Men : Challenger 6; 24 players - $6,000 −−−−−− Women : Challenger 6; 24 players - $6,000	16–20 January	(Hong Kong) Toby Tse; 11–5, 7–11, 15–17, 11–7, 9–11 (2nd PSA title)	(Hong Kong) Cheng Nga Ching	(South Korea) Heo Min-gyeong (Hong Kong) Ena Kwong	(Malaysia) Goh Zhi Xuan (Hong Kong) Helen Tang (Japan) Akari Midorikawa (Hong Kong) Kirstie Wong
Lethbridge ProAm; Lethbridge, Canada; Men : Challenger 6; 24 players – $6,000	17–21 January	(Egypt) Kareem El Torkey; 12–10, 11–3, 11–3 (3rd PSA title)	(France) Brice Nicolas	(Switzerland) Robin Gadola (France) Paul Gonzalez	(Brazil) Guilherme Melo (Canada) Liam Marrison (Finland) Henrik Mustonen (Canada) Maximilien Godbout
J.P. Morgan Tournament of Champions; New York City, United States; Men : World Tour Platinum; 48 players – $190,000 −−−−−− Women : World Tour Platinum; 48 players – $190,000	17–25 January	(Egypt) Ali Farag; 7–11, 11–6, 11–4, 9–11, 11–5 (37th PSA title)	(Peru) Diego Elías	(Egypt) Mostafa Asal (France) Victor Crouin	(England) Mohamed El Shorbagy (Egypt) Tarek Momen (New Zealand) Paul Coll (Egypt) Mazen Hesham
J.P. Morgan Tournament of Champions; New York City, United States; Men : World Tour Platinum; 48 players – $190,000 −−−−−− Women : World Tour Platinum; 48 players – $190,000	17–25 January	(Egypt) Nour El Sherbini; 9–11, 4–11, 11–5, 11–5, 11–5 (39th PSA title)	(Egypt) Nouran Gohar	(Egypt) Hania El Hammamy (Egypt) Rowan Elaraby	(Egypt) Amina Orfi (Egypt) Nour El Tayeb (Egypt) Fayrouz Aboelkheir (United States) Olivia Weaver
Squash Inspire - Women’s Open; Columbia, United States; Women : Challenger 15; 24 players – $15,000	23–27 January	(Egypt) Nardine Garas; 13–11, 7–11, 14–12, 12–10 (2nd PSA title)	(United States) Caroline Fouts	(France) Lauren Baltayan (Canada) Danielle Ray	(Egypt) Menna Walid (India) Akanksha Salunkhe (France) Énora Villard (Germany) Katerina Týcová
Gas City Open; Medicine Hat, Canada; Men : Challenger 6; 24 players - $6,000	25–28 January	(France) Brice Nicolas; 12–14, 11–6, 11–6, 16–14 (1st PSA title)	(Egypt) Kareem El Torkey	(Switzerland) Robin Gadola (Finland) Henrik Mustonen	(France) Manuel Paquemar (France) Laouenan Loaëc (France) Paul Gonzalez (United States) Salim Khan
Carol Weymuller Open; New York City, United States; Women : World Tour Bronze; 24 players – $51,250	25–29 January	(Egypt) Farida Mohamed; 12–10, 11–4, 7–11, 11–8 (7th PSA title)	(Egypt) Fayrouz Aboelkheir	(Egypt) Salma Hany (United States) Olivia Weaver	(Canada) Hollie Naughton (England) Sarah-Jane Perry (Egypt) Hana Ramadan (England) Lucy Beecroft
Brno Open; Brno, Czech Republic; Men : Challenger 3; 16 players - $3,000 −−−−−− Women : Challenger 3; 16 players - $3,000	30 Jan. – 2 Feb.	(Czech Republic) Daniel Mekbib; 11–8, 11–4, 11–6 (7th PSA title)	(Czech Republic) Martin Švec	(New Zealand) Anthony Lepper (Czech Republic) Jakub Solnický	(Czech Republic) Martin Štepán (Czech Republic) David Zeman (Poland) Jakub Pytlowany (Poland) Tomasz Matejski
Brno Open; Brno, Czech Republic; Men : Challenger 3; 16 players - $3,000 −−−−−− Women : Challenger 3; 16 players - $3,000	30 Jan. – 2 Feb.	(Czech Republic) Michaela Cepová; 7–11, 11–7, 11–4, 6–11, 11–7 (1st PSA title)	(Czech Republic) Karolína Šrámková	(Ukraine) Anastasia Kostiukova (Poland) Tola Otrząsek	(Czech Republic) Riana Alexová (Czech Republic) Tamara Holzbauerová (Serbia) Jelena Dutina (Czech Republic) Ella Pelikánová
HK Squash PSA Challenge Cup - 2nd leg Hong Kong, China; Men : Challenger 9; 24 players - $9,000 −−−−−− Women : Challenger 9; 24 players - $9,000	30 Jan. – 3 Feb.	(Hong Kong) Matthew Lai; 11–8, 11–7, 11–6 (2nd PSA title)	(Pakistan) Noor Zaman	(Hong Kong) Andes Ling (Egypt) Yassin ElShafei	(Japan) Tomotaka Endo (Hong Kong) Tang Ming Hong (Malaysia) Ong Sai Hung (Hong Kong) Ho Ka Hei
HK Squash PSA Challenge Cup - 2nd leg Hong Kong, China; Men : Challenger 9; 24 players - $9,000 −−−−−− Women : Challenger 9; 24 players - $9,000	30 Jan. – 3 Feb.	(Malaysia) Chan Yiwen; 11–5, 11–4, 11–6 (3rd PSA title)	(Egypt) Amina El Rihany	(Egypt) Habiba Hani (Egypt) Jana Swaify	(Hong Kong) Toby Tse (Hong Kong) Cheng Nga Ching (Malta) Colette Sultana (Colombia) Catalina Peláez
Sturbridge Capital Motor City Open; Bloomfield Hills, United States; Men : World Tour Silver; 24 players – $80,000	31 Jan. – 4 Feb.	(Peru) Diego Elías; 11–8, 11–9, 11–6 (16th PSA title)	(New Zealand) Paul Coll	(Egypt) Fares Dessouky (Colombia) Miguel Á Rodríguez	(England) Adrian Waller (Portugal) Rui Soares (Switzerland) Nicolas Müller (Egypt) Mohamed ElSherbini
Bahl & Gaynor Cincinnati Cup; Cincinnati, United States; Women : World Tour Silver; 24 players – $75,000	31 Jan. – 4 Feb.	(United States) Olivia Weaver; 11–8, 11–1, 11–7 (6th PSA title)	(Belgium) Tinne Gilis	(Egypt) Rowan Elaraby (England) Georgina Kennedy	(Egypt) Kenzy Ayman (Malaysia) Sivasangari Subramaniam (Wales) Tesni Murphy (Egypt) Fayrouz Aboelkheir

=== February ===
Tournament	Date	Champion	Runner-Up	Semifinalists	Quarterfinalists
DAC Pro Squash Classic; Detroit, United States; Women : World Tour Silver; 24 players – $82,500	6–10 February	(United States) Olivia Weaver; 11–8, 11–3, 11–2 (7th PSA title)	(Egypt) Rowan Elaraby	(Egypt) Nouran Gohar (Canada) Hollie Naughton	(Egypt) Nada Abbas (Egypt) Hana Moataz (England) Jasmine Hutton (France) Mélissa Alves
Pittsburgh Open; Pittsburgh, United States; Men : World Tour Silver; 24 players - $75,800	7–11 February	(Egypt) Karim Abdel Gawad; 11–3, 11–8, 11–9 (28th PSA title)	(England) Marwan El Shorbagy	(Egypt) Youssef Soliman (Egypt) Youssef Ibrahim	(France) Sébastien Bonmalais (England) Adrian Waller (Switzerland) Yannick Wilhelmi (India) Velavan Senthilkumar
Pembroke Management Open de Montreal; Montreal, Canada; Men : Challenger 20; 24 players – $20,000	7–11 February	(Scotland) Greg Lobban; 11–8, 11–5, 11–8 (13th PSA title)	(England) Nathan Lake	(England) Tom Walsh (Malaysia) Sanjay Jeeva	(England) Finnlay Withington (Canada) David Baillargeon (Wales) Emyr Evans (France) Toufik Mekhalfi
Squash On Fire Challenge; Washington, D.C., United States; Men : Challenger 3; 24 players - $3,000 −−−−−− Women : Challenger 3; 16 players - $3,000	9–11 February	(Pakistan) Asim Khan; 13–11, 6–11, 11–5, 8–11, 11–7 (8th PSA title)	(Pakistan) Ashab Irfan	(Czech Republic) Daniel Mekbib (Pakistan) Abdul Malik Khan	(Egypt) Omar Elkattan (Colombia) Andrés Herrera (England) Mark Broekman (United States) Salim Khan
Squash On Fire Challenge; Washington, D.C., United States; Men : Challenger 3; 24 players - $3,000 −−−−−− Women : Challenger 3; 16 players - $3,000	9–11 February	(Egypt) Menna Walid; 11–5, 11–4, ^{rtd.} (4th PSA title)	(Ukraine) Alina Bushma	(Egypt) Amina El Rihany (United States) Eliza Schuster	(Mexico) Diana Gasca (Canada) Mariam Mansoor (United States) Uma Patnaik (United States) Allie Stoddard
Ipswich Sports Club Challenger Cup; Ipswich, England; Men : Challenger 12; 24 players – $12,000 −−−−−− Women : Challenger 12; 24 players – $12,000	13–17 February	(Egypt) Moustafa El Sirty; 11–7, 8–11, 11–5, 7–11, 11–5 (15th PSA title)	(England) Declan James	(England) Jonah Bryant (Wales) Owain Taylor	(Malaysia) Ameeshenraj Chandaran (Malaysia) Darren Pragasam (Spain) Iván Pérez (Czech Republic) Jakub Solnický
Ipswich Sports Club Challenger Cup; Ipswich, England; Men : Challenger 12; 24 players – $12,000 −−−−−− Women : Challenger 12; 24 players – $12,000	13–17 February	(England) Katie Malliff; 11–5, 11–8, 11–7 (3rd PSA title)	(Egypt) Nour Heikal	(France) Lauren Baltayan (Malaysia) Yasshmita Jadishkumar	(Wales) Lowri Roberts (Egypt) Rana Ismail (Egypt) Nour Khafagy (New Zealand) Kaitlyn Watts
HSC Houston Men's Open; Houston, United States; Men : World Tour Gold; 24 players – $110,000	13–18 February	(Egypt) Ali Farag; 11–4, 11–9, 11–5 (38th PSA title)	(Egypt) Mazen Hesham	(England) Mohamed El Shorbagy (Egypt) Karim Abdel Gawad	(Egypt) Mostafa Asal (Egypt) Aly Abou Eleinen (Egypt) Tarek Momen (Colombia) Miguel Á Rodríguez
Squash on Fire Open; Washington, D.C., United States; Men : World Tour Bronze; 24 players – $50,000 −−−−−− Women : World Tour Bronze; 24 players – $50,000	14–18 February	(Egypt) Youssef Soliman; 11–5, 11–4, 10–12, 11–3 (10th PSA title)	(Spain) Iker Pajares	(France) Victor Crouin (Egypt) Youssef Ibrahim	(England) Nathan Lake (United States) Todd Harrity (Scotland) Greg Lobban (India) Saurav Ghosal
Squash on Fire Open; Washington, D.C., United States; Men : World Tour Bronze; 24 players – $50,000 −−−−−− Women : World Tour Bronze; 24 players – $50,000	14–18 February	(Egypt) Amina Orfi; 15–13, 11–1, 9–11, 8–11, 11–9 (4th PSA title)	(Belgium) Tinne Gilis	(United States) Sabrina Sobhy (Hong Kong) Tomato Ho	(Malaysia) Aira Azman (Malaysia) Rachel Arnold (Egypt) Hana Moataz (Egypt) Menna Walid
The Bee-Clean Edmonton SC Winter Open; Edmonton, Canada; Men : Challenger 9; 24 players – $9,000	14–18 February	(England) Finnlay Withington; 11–9, 11–6, 11–1 (3rd PSA title)	(Mexico) Alfredo Ávila	(Wales) Emyr Evans (Wales) Elliott Morris Devred	(England) Perry Malik (Colombia) Edgar Ramírez (Hong Kong) Tang Ming Hong (Hong Kong) Wong Chi Him
Goodfellow Classic; Toronto, Canada; Men : Challenger 9; 24 players - $9,000	20–24 February	(India) Abhay Singh; 11–7, 11–9, 11–9 (9th PSA title)	(Wales) Elliott Morris Devred	(Egypt) Abdelrahman Abdelkhalek (England) Robert Downer	(Mexico) Edgar Zayas (Mexico) César Segundo (Mexico) Alejandro Reyes (France) Macéo Lévy
MRU Open; Calgary, Canada; Men : Challenger 9; 24 players - $9,000	21–25 February	(England) Jonah Bryant; 17–19, 11–6, 14–12, 11–7 (4th PSA title)	(France) Edwin Clain	(Czech Republic) Daniel Mekbib (England) Perry Malik	(Hong Kong) Wong Chi Him (Hong Kong) Harley Lam (England) Finnlay Withington (Hong Kong) Tang Ming Hong
East Glos Club Open; Cheltenham, England; Men : Challenger 3; 16 players – $3,000 −−−−−− Women : Challenger 3; 16 players – $3,000	23–25 February	(Wales) Rhys Evans; 11–5, 11–8, 11–6 (1st PSA title)	(England) Jared Carter	(England) James Peach (New Zealand) Joel Arscott	(England) Anthony Rogal (Republic of Ireland) Conor Moran (Republic of Ireland) Aaron Allpress (Scotland) John Meehan
East Glos Club Open; Cheltenham, England; Men : Challenger 3; 16 players – $3,000 −−−−−− Women : Challenger 3; 16 players – $3,000	23–25 February	(Egypt) Hana Ismail; 11–6, 11–7, 4–11, 11–2 (1st PSA title)	(Wales) Lowri Roberts	(England) Kiera Marshall (Scotland) Robyn McAlpine	(England) Reka Kemecsei (Republic of Ireland) Breanne Flynn (England) Isabel McCullough (England) Amelie Haworth
Windy City Open; Chicago, United States; Men : World Tour Platinum; 48 players – $250,000 −−−−−− Women : World Tour Platinum; 48 players – $250,000	21–28 February	(Egypt) Ali Farag; 11–8, 5–11, 11–7, 15–13 (39th PSA title)	(New Zealand) Paul Coll	(Egypt) Mazen Hesham (Egypt) Mostafa Asal	(England) Mohamed El Shorbagy (Peru) Diego Elías (Egypt) Karim Abdel Gawad (France) Victor Crouin
Windy City Open; Chicago, United States; Men : World Tour Platinum; 48 players – $250,000 −−−−−− Women : World Tour Platinum; 48 players – $250,000	21–28 February	(Egypt) Nour El Sherbini; 11–7, 6–11, 11–4, 11–4 (40th PSA title)	(Egypt) Nouran Gohar	(England) Georgina Kennedy (Egypt) Hania El Hammamy	(Belgium) Nele Gilis (Belgium) Tinne Gilis (United States) Olivia Weaver (United States) Sabrina Sobhy
Chronicle Wealth Guilfoyle PSA Classic; Toronto, Canada; Men : Challenger 9; 24 players - $9,000	27 Feb. – 2 Mar.	(England) Stuart MacGregor; 10–12, 11–1, 9–11, 11–2, 11–5 (3rd PSA title)	(Brazil) Diego Gobbi	(Wales) Elliott Morris Devred (Colombia) Juan José Torres	(England) Perry Malik (Egypt) Ibrahim Elkabbani (Mexico) Alejandro Reyes (Mexico) Jorge Gómez
Squash Inspire - Men's Pro Challenger; Columbia, United States; Men : Challenger 9; 24 players – $9,000	27 Feb. – 2 Mar.	(Pakistan) Asim Khan; 17–15, 14–12, 4–11, 10–12, 11–8 (9th PSA title)	(Pakistan) Ashab Irfan	(Guatemala) Alejandro Enríquez (Pakistan) Hamza Khan	(Guatemala) Josué Enríquez (Egypt) Seif Shenawy (United States) Christopher Gordon (Chile) José Gallegos
PSA Poznań Open; Poznań, Poland; Men : Challenger 6; 24 players - $6,000	27 Feb. – 2 Mar.	(Czech Republic) Jakub Solnický; 11–8, 11–8, 11–4 (3rd PSA title)	(Scotland) Alasdair Prott	(Egypt) Sohail El Shenawy (Czech Republic) Daniel Mekbib	(New Zealand) Elijah Thomas (Egypt) Moustafa El Sirty (Germany) Jan Wipperfürth (Netherlands) Sebastiaan Hofman
Underhill Geomatics Sport Central Open; Richmond, Canada; Women : Challenger 9; 24 players – $9,000	28 Feb. – 3 Mar.	(Egypt) Rana Ismail; 11–8, 11–6, 5–11, 10–12, 11–8 (3rd PSA title)	(United States) Caroline Fouts	(United States) Riya Navani (Austria) Jacqueline Peychär	(Colombia) Lucía Bautista (Scotland) Alison Thomson (Hong Kong) Heylie Fung (Republic of Ireland) Hannah Craig
PSA Club Euro Sport; La Pineda, Spain; Men : Challenger 6; 24 players – $6,000	28 Feb. – 3 Mar.	(Spain) Iván Pérez; 11–8, 8–11, 14–12, 11–5 (5th PSA title)	(Egypt) Mohamed Nasser	(Spain) Hugo Varela (Wales) Owain Taylor	(Switzerland) Robin Gadola (Republic of Ireland) Sam Buckley (Malaysia) Ameeshenraj Chandaran (Egypt) Ziad Ibrahim
WR Sturricks Lexden RFC Open; Lexden, England; Men : Challenger 3; 24 players – $3,000 −−−−−− Women : Challenger 3; 24 players – $3,000	29 Feb. – 3 Mar.	(Malaysia) Darren Pragasam; 11–7, 11–9, 11–4 (2nd PSA title)	(England) Jared Carter	(England) Will Salter (Netherlands) Sam Gerrits	(Egypt) Abdelrahman Abdelkhalek (Scotland) Martin Ross (Republic of Ireland) Aaron Allpress (Sri Lanka) Shamil Wakeel
WR Sturricks Lexden RFC Open; Lexden, England; Men : Challenger 3; 24 players – $3,000 −−−−−− Women : Challenger 3; 24 players – $3,000	29 Feb. – 3 Mar.	(Egypt) Hana Ismail; 11–5, 11–5, 11–5 (2nd PSA title)	(Australia) Erin Classen	(England) Olivia Besant (Malaysia) Chen Yu Ng	(Spain) Sofía Mateos (Scotland) Katriona Ross (England) Polly Clark (Japan) Akari Midorikawa

=== March ===
Tournament	Date	Champion	Runner-Up	Semifinalists	Quarterfinalists
Canadian Men's Open; Toronto, Canada; Men : World Tour Silver; 24 players – $78,000	3–7 March	(Peru) Diego Elías; 11–2, 11–2, 9–11, 11–8 (17th PSA title)	(Egypt) Mazen Hesham	(Egypt) Youssef Soliman (Hungary) Balázs Farkas	(Switzerland) Yannick Wilhelmi (Switzerland) Dimitri Steinmann (Switzerland) Nicolas Müller (Canada) David Baillargeon
Odense Open; Odense, Denmark; Men : Challenger 12; 24 players – $12,000 −−−−−− Women : Challenger 12; 24 players – $12,000	5–9 March	(England) Declan James; 11–5, 11–9, 9–11, 11–7 (14th PSA title)	(Wales) Owain Taylor	(Egypt) Moustafa El Sirty (Malaysia) Darren Pragasam	(Egypt) Ziad Ibrahim (Spain) Iván Pérez (Scotland) Alasdair Prott (Germany) Valentin Rapp
Odense Open; Odense, Denmark; Men : Challenger 12; 24 players – $12,000 −−−−−− Women : Challenger 12; 24 players – $12,000	5–9 March	(Egypt) Nardine Garas; 11–8, 8–11, 14–12, 11–7 (3rd PSA title)	(Egypt) Amina El Rihany	(France) Lauren Baltayan (Egypt) Nadien Elhammamy	(England) Kiera Marshall (Egypt) Habiba Hani (Wales) Lowri Roberts (France) Élise Romba
Yellow Dots Squash Open; Lagos, Nigeria; Men : Challenger 3; 16 players – $3,000 −−−−−− Women : Challenger 3; 16 players – $3,000	6–9 March	(Nigeria) Gabriel Olufunmilayo; 11–5, 11–9, 10–12, 11–4 (1st PSA title)	(Nigeria) Kehinde Temitope	(Nigeria) Sulaimon Faruq (Nigeria) Ayomide Oladipupo	(Nigeria) Dominion Utukpe (Nigeria) Abel Shedrack (Nigeria) Promise James (Nigeria) Femi Shedara
Yellow Dots Squash Open; Lagos, Nigeria; Men : Challenger 3; 16 players – $3,000 −−−−−− Women : Challenger 3; 16 players – $3,000	6–9 March	(Nigeria) Olatunji Busayo; 11–8, 12–14, 7–11, 11–8, 11–4 (1st PSA title)	(Nigeria) Abdulazeez Rofiat	(Nigeria) Blessing Isaac (Nigeria) Favour Utukpe	(Nigeria) Delight Allison (Nigeria) Veronica Sunday (Nigeria) Misturah Durosinlorun (Nigeria) Awawu Balogun
Squash In The Land; Cleveland, United States; Men : World Tour Bronze; 24 players – $51,250	5–10 March	(Mexico) Leonel Cárdenas; 13–11, 11–6, 11–6 (15th PSA title)	(Spain) Bernat Jaume	(Scotland) Greg Lobban (Egypt) Youssef Ibrahim	(England) Nathan Lake (Malaysia) Eain Yow (Pakistan) Asim Khan (United States) Shahjahan Khan
Women : World Tour Silver; 24 players – $75,000	5–10 March	(Egypt) Nour El Tayeb; 9–11, 11–6, 11–6, 11–5 (16th PSA title)	(England) Georgina Kennedy	(Malaysia) Sivasangari Subramaniam (United States) Olivia Weaver	(Egypt) Farida Mohamed (England) Alicia Mead (Wales) Emily Whitlock (England) Lucy Beecroft
Oasis Pools & Spas Manitoba Open; Winnipeg, Canada; Men : Challenger 15; 24 players – $15,000	6–10 March	(Egypt) Ibrahim Elkabbani; 11–8, 9–11, 11–8, 11–8 (6th PSA title)	(Hong Kong) Alex Lau	(Egypt) Kareem El Torkey (England) Ben Smith	(Colombia) Edgar Ramírez (Egypt) Mazen Gamal (Mexico) Sebastián Salazar (Finland) Henrik Mustonen
Richardson Wealth Van Lawn Open; Vancouver, Canada; Women : Challenger 15; 24 players – $15,000	6–10 March	(Egypt) Rana Ismail; 11–5, 11–6, 11–9 (4th PSA title)	(Hong Kong) Tong Tsz Wing	(Egypt) Menna Walid (Egypt) Nour Heikal	(France) Marie Stephan (Scotland) Alison Thomson (Japan) Erisa Sano (Mexico) Diana García
University of the West of England Bristol Open; Bristol, England; Men : Challenger 3; 24 players – $3,000 −−−−−− Women : Challenger 3; 24 players – $3,000	7–10 March	(Colombia) Ronald Palomino; 11–8, 11–3, 2–11, 8–11, 11–9 (5th PSA title)	(England) James Peach	(Wales) Rhys Evans (England) Jared Carter	(Malaysia) Ameeshenraj Chandaran (Canada) Mitchell Kahnert (Sri Lanka) Shamil Wakeel (Kuwait) Ammar Al-Tamimi
University of the West of England Bristol Open; Bristol, England; Men : Challenger 3; 24 players – $3,000 −−−−−− Women : Challenger 3; 24 players – $3,000	7–10 March	(Egypt) Hana Ismail; 5–11, 11–5, 11–5, 11–6 (3rd PSA title)	(Republic of Ireland) Breanne Flynn	(India) Urwashi Joshi (Singapore) Wai Yhann Au Yeong	(Australia) Erin Classen (England) Amelie Haworth (Japan) Akari Midorikawa (Malta) Colette Sultana
OptAsia Championships; Wimbledon, England; Men : World Tour Gold; 24 players – $110,000	12–17 March	(New Zealand) Paul Coll; 8–11, 2–11, 12–10, 12–10, 11–9 (24th PSA title)	(Egypt) Ali Farag	(Egypt) Mostafa Asal (Egypt) Karim Abdel Gawad	(England) Mohamed El Shorbagy (England) Marwan El Shorbagy (Wales) Joel Makin (France) Baptiste Masotti
Women : World Tour Bronze; 24 players – $57,500	12–17 March	(Japan) Satomi Watanabe; 11–9, 11–8, 11–6 (9th PSA title)	(Belgium) Nele Gilis	(Egypt) Nada Abbas (England) Jasmine Hutton	(France) Mélissa Alves (England) Sarah-Jane Perry (Wales) Tesni Murphy (Egypt) Hana Moataz
Calgary CFO Women's Squash Week; Calgary, Canada; Women : Challenger 20; 24 players – $20,000	13–17 March	(Scotland) Georgia Adderley; 7–11, 11–7, 11–4, 6–11, 11–4 (5th PSA title)	(Egypt) Salma El Tayeb	(Canada) Nicole Bunyan (Egypt) Nour Heikal	(England) Lucy Turmel (Ukraine) Alina Bushma (Egypt) Menna Walid (Poland) Karina Tyma
City Tattersalls Group Australian Open; Sydney, Australia; Men : World Tour Bronze; 24 players – $52,500 −−−−−− Women : World Tour Bronze; 24 players – $52,500	20–24 March	(Egypt) Youssef Soliman; 11–8, 11–4, 4–11, 11–6 (11th PSA title)	(France) Victor Crouin	(Switzerland) Dimitri Steinmann (France) Sébastien Bonmalais	(Hong Kong) Henry Leung (Canada) David Baillargeon (Hong Kong) Alex Lau (Japan) Ryūnosuke Tsukue
City Tattersalls Group Australian Open; Sydney, Australia; Men : World Tour Bronze; 24 players – $52,500 −−−−−− Women : World Tour Bronze; 24 players – $52,500	20–24 March	(Egypt) Salma Hany; 11–5, 11–8, 11–9 (4th PSA title)	(Egypt) Amina Orfi	(Hong Kong) Tomato Ho (Egypt) Sana Ibrahim	(Malaysia) Rachel Arnold (Malaysia) Chan Yiwen (Malaysia) Aira Azman (France) Marie Stephan
The Bee-Clean Edmonton SC Women's Open; Edmonton, Canada; Women : Challenger 9; 24 players – $9,000	20–24 March	(Egypt) Nour Heikal; 11–3, 6–11, 11–6, 7–11, 11–5 (2nd PSA title)	(Egypt) Menna Walid	(England) Kiera Marshall (Republic of Ireland) Hannah Craig	(Hong Kong) Toby Tse (Egypt) Salma El-Alfy (France) Élise Romba (Czech Republic) Michaela Cepová
Aldi Hinckley Challenger; Hinckley, England; Men : Challenger 3; 24 players – $3,000	21–24 March	(Egypt) Omar El Torkey; 11–6, 11–4, 11–6 (2nd PSA title)	(England) Jared Carter	(Wales) Rhys Evans (Malaysia) Hafiz Zhafri	(Egypt) Ali Khawas (England) Lewis Doughty (Colombia) Ronald Palomino (New Zealand) Joel Arscott
Expression Network Kinetic Women's; Boynton Beach, United States; Women : Challenger 20; 24 players – $20,000	26–30 March	(Egypt) Farida Mohamed; 11–9, 11–8, 11–8 (8th PSA title)	(England) Lucy Beecroft	(United States) Marina Stefanoni (United States) Caroline Fouts	(Canada) Danielle Ray (Switzerland) Nadia Pfister (England) Saran Nghiem (France) Taba Taghavi
Liverpool Cricket Club Open; Liverpool, England; Men : Challenger 15; 24 players – $15,000	26–30 March	(Malaysia) Ameeshenraj Chandaran; 11–6, 11–3, 11–5 (2nd PSA title)	(Czech Republic) Viktor Byrtus	(Egypt) Kareem El Torkey (England) Ben Smith	(Wales) Emyr Evans (Pakistan) Asim Khan (Egypt) Moustafa El Sirty (Scotland) Alasdair Prott
PSA Hollolan Kuntokeidas; Hollola, Finland; Men : Challenger 3; 24 players – $3,000	27–30 March	(Egypt) Omar El Torkey; 11–7, 11–9, 11–5 (3rd PSA title)	(Malaysia) Hafiz Zhafri	(France) Manuel Paquemar (France) Joshua Phinéra	(Egypt) Louai Hafez (France) Laouenan Loaëc (Denmark) Theis Houlberg (Finland) Henrik Mustonen
GillenMarkets London Squash Classic; London, England; Men : World Tour Gold; 24 players – $108,500 −−−−−− Women : World Tour Gold; 24 players – $108,500	27 Mar. – 1 Apr.	(New Zealand) Paul Coll; 11–8, 11–13, 11–7, 8–1^{rtd.} (25th PSA title)	(Egypt) Mostafa Asal	(Wales) Joel Makin (England) Declan James	(England) Marwan El Shorbagy (England) George Parker (Egypt) Karim Abdel Gawad (Egypt) Aly Abou Eleinen
GillenMarkets London Squash Classic; London, England; Men : World Tour Gold; 24 players – $108,500 −−−−−− Women : World Tour Gold; 24 players – $108,500	27 Mar. – 1 Apr.	(Malaysia) Sivasangari Subramaniam; 11–9, 5–11, 13–11, 12–14, 11–8 (14th PSA title)	(Egypt) Hania El Hammamy	(Belgium) Nele Gilis (Egypt) Nouran Gohar	(Egypt) Fayrouz Aboelkheir (England) Georgina Kennedy (Egypt) Nour El Sherbini (England) Sarah-Jane Perry

=== April ===
Tournament	Date	Champion	Runner-Up	Semifinalists	Quarterfinalists
German Open; Hamburg, Germany; Men : World Tour Bronze; 24 players – $50,000 −−−−−− Women : World Tour Bronze; 24 players – $50,000	3–7 April	(Malaysia) Eain Yow; 12–10, 11–8, 10–12, 11–3 (7th PSA title)	(Switzerland) Dimitri Steinmann	(Wales) Joel Makin (Egypt) Mohamed ElSherbini	(Germany) Raphael Kandra (United States) Timothy Brownell (Spain) Bernat Jaume (India) Velavan Senthilkumar
German Open; Hamburg, Germany; Men : World Tour Bronze; 24 players – $50,000 −−−−−− Women : World Tour Bronze; 24 players – $50,000	3–7 April	(England) Georgina Kennedy; 11–9, 11–6, 7–11, 14–12 (12th PSA title)	(Belgium) Nele Gilis	(Egypt) Salma Hany (Wales) Tesni Murphy	(Belgium) Tinne Gilis (Egypt) Fayrouz Aboelkheir (Egypt) Malak Khafagy (Germany) Saskia Beinhard
World Championship Qualifiers – Oceania; Carrara, Australia; Men : WC Qualifier; 16 players – $5,050 −−−−−− Women : WC Qualifier; 16 players – $5,050	4–7 April	(Australia) Joseph White; 11–8, 11–8, 6–11, 11–6 (Qualified for PSA World Championship & 3rd PSA title)	(Australia) Rhys Dowling	(New Zealand) Temwa Chileshe (Australia) Nicholas Calvert	(Australia) Dylan Molinaro (New Zealand) Elijah Thomas (New Zealand) Anthony Lepper (Australia) Tate Norris
World Championship Qualifiers – Oceania; Carrara, Australia; Men : WC Qualifier; 16 players – $5,050 −−−−−− Women : WC Qualifier; 16 players – $5,050	4–7 April	(Australia) Alex Haydon; 8–11, 11–9, 11–3, 11–6 (Qualified for PSA World Championship & 1st PSA title)	(Australia) Sarah Cardwell	(Australia) Erin Classen (New Zealand) Ella Lash	(Australia) Lee Sze Yu (Australia) Madison Lyon (Australia) Rachael Grinham (Australia) Remashree Muniandy
Rotterdam Open; Rotterdam, Netherlands; Men : Challenger 6; 24 players – $6,000	8–12 April	(Egypt) Omar El Torkey; 11–7, 11–7, 5–11, 11–8 (4th PSA title)	(Wales) Elliott Morris Devred	(Colombia) Ronald Palomino (Hong Kong) Leo Chung	(Switzerland) Robin Gadola (England) James Peach (Belgium) Joeri Hapers (Germany) Valentin Rapp
HK Squash PSA Challenge Cup - 3rd leg Hong Kong, China; Men : Challenger 3; 16 players - $3,000 −−−−−− Women : Challenger 3; 16 players - $3,000	9–12 April	(Hong Kong) Andes Ling; 11–8, 11–9, 11–5 (1st PSA title)	(Hong Kong) Harley Lam	(Hong Kong) Lam Shing Fung (Hong Kong) To Wai Lok	(Hong Kong) Lap Man Au (Hong Kong) Wilson Chan (Hong Kong) Rain Wong (Hong Kong) Anson Wong
HK Squash PSA Challenge Cup - 3rd leg Hong Kong, China; Men : Challenger 3; 16 players - $3,000 −−−−−− Women : Challenger 3; 16 players - $3,000	9–12 April	(Hong Kong) Toby Tse; 11–5, 11–8, 7–11, 11–8 (3rd PSA title)	(Hong Kong) Kirstie Wong	(Hong Kong) Ena Kwong (Hong Kong) Helen Tang	(Hong Kong) Heylie Fung (Philippines) Jemyca Aribado (Hong Kong) Pik Ching Cheng (Hong Kong) Bobo Lam
RC Pro Series; St. Louis, United States; Men : Challenger 15; 24 players – $15,000 −−−−−− Women : Challenger 15; 24 players – $15,000	9–13 April	(England) Jonah Bryant; 11–3, 11–8, 11–9 (5th PSA title)	(Mexico) César Salazar	(Argentina) Jeremías Azaña (Malaysia) Sanjay Jeeva	(Mexico) Alfredo Ávila (England) Lewis Anderson (Colombia) Andrés Herrera (United States) Dillon Huang
RC Pro Series; St. Louis, United States; Men : Challenger 15; 24 players – $15,000 −−−−−− Women : Challenger 15; 24 players – $15,000	9–13 April	(England) Saran Nghiem; 11–5, 11–8, 10–12, 9–11, 11–2 (4th PSA title)	(United States) Riya Navani	(Ukraine) Alina Bushma (Egypt) Jana Safy	(Egypt) Malak Moustafa (India) Akanksha Salunkhe (Egypt) Jana Swaify (Malaysia) Vanessa Raj
World Championship Qualifiers – Europe; Sautron, France; Men : WC Qualifier; 16 players – $5,050 −−−−−− Women : WC Qualifier; 16 players – $5,050	10–13 April	(Czech Republic) Martin Švec; 9–11, 3–11, 13–11, 11–9, 11–5 (Qualified for PSA World Championship & 3rd PSA title)	(England) Ben Smith	(Wales) Emyr Evans (Czech Republic) Daniel Mekbib	(France) Edwin Clain (France) Brice Nicolas (England) Perry Malik (Spain) Iván Pérez
World Championship Qualifiers – Europe; Sautron, France; Men : WC Qualifier; 16 players – $5,050 −−−−−− Women : WC Qualifier; 16 players – $5,050	10–13 April	(Spain) Marta Domínguez; 11–5, 11–4, 7–11, 11–6 (Qualified for PSA World Championship & 4th PSA title)	(Wales) Lowri Roberts	(France) Lauren Baltayan (Scotland) Alison Thomson	(England) Asia Harris (Republic of Ireland) Hannah Craig (England) Kiera Marshall (Germany) Saskia Beinhard
Life Time PSA Tour - Berkeley Heights; Berkeley Heights, United States; Women : Challenger 3; 16 players – $3,000	11–14 April	(Barbados) Margot Prow; 11–5, 11–8, 12–10 (1st PSA title)	(United States) Laila Sedky	(Malaysia) Wen Li Lai (United States) Eliza Schuster	(Canada) Iman Shaheen (Pakistan) Amna Fayyaz (Guyana) Mary Fung-A-Fat (Bulgaria) Selena Georgieva
Black Ball Squash Open; New Cairo, Egypt; Men : World Tour Gold; 24 players – $108,500 −−−−−− Women : World Tour Gold; 24 players – $108,500	11–16 April	(Egypt) Mostafa Asal; 12–10, 11–5, 7–11, 11–8 (14th PSA title)	(Egypt) Ali Farag	(Egypt) Karim Abdel Gawad (Egypt) Mazen Hesham	(Egypt) Youssef Ibrahim (Egypt) Fares Dessouky (Colombia) Miguel Á Rodríguez (Egypt) Mohamed ElSherbini
Black Ball Squash Open; New Cairo, Egypt; Men : World Tour Gold; 24 players – $108,500 −−−−−− Women : World Tour Gold; 24 players – $108,500	11–16 April	(Egypt) Nouran Gohar; 11–7, 11–5, 11–7 (24th PSA title)	(United States) Olivia Weaver	(Egypt) Nour El Tayeb (Belgium) Tinne Gilis	(Egypt) Rowan Elaraby (Egypt) Salma Hany (Egypt) Hana Moataz (Egypt) Nada Abbas
World Championship Qualifiers – Africa; New Cairo, Egypt; Men : WC Qualifier; 16 players – $5,050 −−−−−− Women : WC Qualifier; 16 players – $5,050	13–16 April	(Egypt) Moustafa El Sirty; 10–12, 11–6, 7–11, 11–2, 14–12 (Qualified for PSA World Championship & 16th PSA title)	(Egypt) Kareem El Torkey	(Egypt) Mohamad Zakaria (Egypt) Mohamed Nasser	(Egypt) Mazen Gamal (Egypt) Yassin ElShafei (Egypt) Seif Shenawy (Egypt) Hazem Hossam
World Championship Qualifiers – Africa; New Cairo, Egypt; Men : WC Qualifier; 16 players – $5,050 −−−−−− Women : WC Qualifier; 16 players – $5,050	13–16 April	(Egypt) Nardine Garas; 11–8, 14–12, 11–9 (Qualified for PSA World Championship & 4th PSA title)	(Egypt) Nadien Elhammamy	(Egypt) Habiba Hani (Egypt) Ingy Hammouda	(Egypt) Malak Fathy (South Africa) Hayley Ward (Egypt) Nour Megahed (Egypt) Nour Khafagy
Garavan's Bar West of Ireland Open (Republic of Ireland) Galway, Ireland; Men : Challenger 12; 24 players - $12,000	16–20 April	(England) Declan James; 11–3, 11–6, 11–6 (15th PSA title)	(Czech Republic) Viktor Byrtus	(Pakistan) Noor Zaman (England) Finnlay Withington	(Pakistan) Asim Khan (England) James Peach (Czech Republic) Daniel Mekbib (Czech Republic) Jakub Solnický
BRESS Breda Open; Breda, Netherlands; Men : Challenger 6; 24 players – $6,000 −−−−−− Women : Challenger 6; 24 players – $6,000	17–21 April	(Egypt) Yassin ElShafei; 11–8, 11–8, 6–11, 11–9 (6th PSA title)	(Egypt) Mohamed Nasser	(Netherlands) Rowan Damming (Belgium) Joeri Hapers	(Nigeria) Onaopemipo Adegoke (Chile) José Gallegos (Spain) Nilo Vidal (France) Joshua Phinéra
BRESS Breda Open; Breda, Netherlands; Men : Challenger 6; 24 players – $6,000 −−−−−− Women : Challenger 6; 24 players – $6,000	17–21 April	(Scotland) Alison Thomson; 11–6, 3–11, 11–9, 7–11, 11–8 (5th PSA title)	(Netherlands) Tessa ter Sluis	(France) Léa Barbeau (United States) Laila Sedky	(France) Ana Munos (New Zealand) Kaitlyn Watts (Netherlands) Fleur Maas (Czech Republic) Tamara Holzbauerová
World Championship Qualifiers – Asia; Seremban, Malaysia; Men : WC Qualifier; 16 players – $5,050 −−−−−− Women : WC Qualifier; 16 players – $5,050	18–21 April	(Japan) Ryūnosuke Tsukue; 11–9, 11–8, 11–3 (Qualified for PSA World Championship & 9th PSA title)	(Malaysia) Addeen Idrakie	(Hong Kong) Tang Ming Hong (Malaysia) Bryan Lim	(Malaysia) Mohd Syafiq Kamal (Malaysia) Darren Pragasam (Malaysia) Ong Sai Hung (Sri Lanka) Ravindu Laksiri
World Championship Qualifiers – Asia; Seremban, Malaysia; Men : WC Qualifier; 16 players – $5,050 −−−−−− Women : WC Qualifier; 16 players – $5,050	18–21 April	(Malaysia) Chan Yiwen; 11–6, 11–3, 11–3 (Qualified for PSA World Championship & 4th PSA title)	(Malaysia) Sehveetrraa Kumar	(Hong Kong) Toby Tse (Hong Kong) Cheng Nga Ching	(Hong Kong) Heylie Fung (Singapore) Wai Yhann Au Yeong (Malaysia) Chen Yu Jie (India) Akanksha Salunkhe
World Championship Qualifiers – Pan America; Columbia, United States; Men : WC Qualifier; 16 players – $5,050 −−−−−− Women : WC Qualifier; 16 players – $5,050	18–21 April	(United States) Spencer Lovejoy; 13–11, 11–5, 11–4 (Qualified for PSA World Championship & 3rd PSA title)	(Guatemala) Alejandro Enríquez	(Ecuador) David Costales (Argentina) Jeremías Azaña	(Mexico) Sebastián Salazar (Canada) Liam Marrison (Mexico) Alejandro Reyes (Brazil) Diego Gobbi
World Championship Qualifiers – Pan America; Columbia, United States; Men : WC Qualifier; 16 players – $5,050 −−−−−− Women : WC Qualifier; 16 players – $5,050	18–21 April	(United States) Caroline Fouts; 11–8, 11–4, 11–5 (Qualified for PSA World Championship & 1st PSA title)	(Mexico) Sarahí López	(Colombia) Laura Tovar (United States) Riya Navani	(Canada) Danielle Ray (Barbados) Margot Prow (Guatemala) Winifer Bonilla (Canada) Iman Shaheen
El Gouna International; El Gouna, Egypt; Men : World Tour Platinum; 48 players – $175,000 ------ Women : World Tour Platinum; 48 players – $175,000	19–26 April	(Egypt) Ali Farag; 11–7, 8–11, 11–4, 11–5 (40th PSA title)	(Egypt) Mostafa Asal	(Egypt) Karim Abdel Gawad (Egypt) Tarek Momen	(New Zealand) Paul Coll (England) Mohamed El Shorbagy (Peru) Diego Elías (Egypt) Aly Abou Eleinen
El Gouna International; El Gouna, Egypt; Men : World Tour Platinum; 48 players – $175,000 ------ Women : World Tour Platinum; 48 players – $175,000	19–26 April	(Egypt) Nouran Gohar; 11–6, 11–13, 11–6, 11–6 (25th PSA title)	(Egypt) Nour El Sherbini	(Belgium) Tinne Gilis (England) Georgina Kennedy	(Egypt) Nour El Tayeb (Egypt) Salma Hany (United States) Olivia Weaver (Egypt) Rowan Elaraby
Cannon Kirk & GillenMarkets Irish Open (Republic of Ireland) Dublin, Ireland; Men : Challenger 20; 24 players – $20,000 −−−−−− Women : Challenger 20; 24 players – $20,000	23–27 April	(England) Jonah Bryant; 8–11, 13–11, 11–9, 11–6 (6th PSA title)	(Egypt) Mohamad Zakaria	(England) George Parker (England) Declan James	(Pakistan) Noor Zaman (France) Lucas Serme (Spain) Iván Pérez (England) Nick Wall
Cannon Kirk & GillenMarkets Irish Open (Republic of Ireland) Dublin, Ireland; Men : Challenger 20; 24 players – $20,000 −−−−−− Women : Challenger 20; 24 players – $20,000	23–27 April	(Egypt) Nada Abbas; 11–8, 9–11, 11–6, 6–11, 11–5 (4th PSA title)	(Wales) Emily Whitlock	(England) Asia Harris (England) Kiera Marshall	(England) Torrie Malik (Poland) Karina Tyma (Republic of Ireland) Hannah Craig (Germany) Katerina Týcová
IQUW Bermuda Open; Devonshire, Bermuda; Men : Challenger 12; 24 players - $12,000 ------ Women : Challenger 12; 16 players - $12,000	23–27 April	(Malaysia) Sanjay Jeeva; 11–7, 11–7, 11–3 (1st PSA title)	(Colombia) Andrés Herrera	(Colombia) Matías Knudsen (Colombia) Edgar Ramírez	(United States) Spencer Lovejoy (Egypt) Seif Shenawy (England) Robert Downer (United States) Christopher Gordon
IQUW Bermuda Open; Devonshire, Bermuda; Men : Challenger 12; 24 players - $12,000 ------ Women : Challenger 12; 16 players - $12,000	23–27 April	(Barbados) Margot Prow; 11–9, 11–9, 11–5 (2nd PSA title)	(Egypt) Ingy Hammouda	(Colombia) Catalina Peláez (Colombia) Laura Tovar	(Egypt) Nour Ramy (Malaysia) Wen Li Lai (Mexico) Sarahí López (England) Polly Clark
Hamdard Squashters Northern Slam; New Delhi, India; Men : Challenger 3; 24 players - $3,000 ------ Women : Challenger 3; 16 players - $3,000	23–27 April	(India) Suraj Chand; 11–13, 11–5, 7–11, 11–9, 11–3 (1st PSA title)	(Sri Lanka) Ravindu Laksiri	(India) Rahul Baitha (South Korea) Ryu Jeong-min	(India) Om Semwal (Egypt) Abdalla Hafez (India) Ayaan Vaziralli (South Korea) Yoo Jae-jin
Hamdard Squashters Northern Slam; New Delhi, India; Men : Challenger 3; 24 players - $3,000 ------ Women : Challenger 3; 16 players - $3,000	23–27 April	(India) Anahat Singh; 11–6, 11–4, 11–5 (2nd PSA title)	(South Korea) Eum Hwa-yeong	(South Korea) Lee Ji-hyun (India) Anjali Semwal	(India) Nirupama Dubey (India) Shameena Riaz (South Korea) Song Chae-won (India) Sunita Patel
Expression St. James Women's 20k Springfield, United States; Women : Challenger 20; 24 players – $20,000	24–28 April	(Egypt) Farida Mohamed; 8–11, 11–6, 12–10, 3–11, 11–7 (9th PSA title)	(Egypt) Menna Hamed	(Ukraine) Alina Bushma (England) Saran Nghiem	(Canada) Danielle Ray (Egypt) Nardine Garas (India) Akanksha Salunkhe (Australia) Alex Haydon
Batch Open; Paris, France; Men : Challenger 12; 24 players – $12,000	24–28 April	(India) Velavan Senthilkumar; 11–6, 11–9, 11–6 (8th PSA title)	(France) Melvil Scianimanico	(Wales) Emyr Evans (Hong Kong) Andes Ling	(Egypt) Yassin ElShafei (Czech Republic) Jakub Solnický (France) Brice Nicolas (Egypt) Hazem Hossam
Rochester Pro-Am; Rochester, United States; Men : Challenger 9; 24 players – $9,000	24–28 April	(Pakistan) Ashab Irfan; 12–10, 11–4, 9–11, 11–9 (1st PSA title)	(Mexico) Jorge Gómez	(Colombia) Ronald Palomino (Egypt) Khaled Labib	(United States) Salim Khan (Egypt) Kareem El Torkey (Austria) Aqeel Rehman (Nigeria) Onaopemipo Adegoke
Giza Region Challenger #1; 6th of October, Egypt; Men : Challenger 3; 24 players – $3,000	28 Apr. – 2 May	(Egypt) Yassin Shohdy; 11–7, 11–5, 11–9 (1st PSA title)	(Egypt) Mohamed Gohar	(Egypt) Seif Tamer (Egypt) Adam Hawal	(Egypt) Taha ElShafei (Egypt) Yahya Megahed (Egypt) Shady El Sherbiny (Egypt) Islam Kouritam
Richmond Open; Richmond, United States; Women : Challenger 30; 24 players – $30,000	30 Apr. – 4 May	(Egypt) Menna Hamed; 12–10, 9–11, 9–11, 11–7, 11–4 (9th PSA title)	(Egypt) Sana Ibrahim	(Egypt) Farida Mohamed (United States) Sabrina Sobhy	(United States) Marina Stefanoni (France) Élise Romba (Egypt) Nardine Garas (United States) Caroline Fouts

=== May ===
Tournament	Date	Champion	Runner-Up	Semifinalists	Quarterfinalists
Hyder Trophy; New York City, United States; Men : Challenger 12; 24 players – $12,000 −−−−−− Women : Challenger 12; 24 players – $12,000	1–5 May	(Egypt) Kareem El Torkey; 7–11, 13–11, 11–7, 11–8 (4th PSA title)	(Argentina) Jeremías Azaña	(Egypt) Khaled Labib (England) Jonah Bryant	(Egypt) Seif Shenawy (Australia) Joseph White (Pakistan) Ashab Irfan (Mexico) Alejandro Reyes
Hyder Trophy; New York City, United States; Men : Challenger 12; 24 players – $12,000 −−−−−− Women : Challenger 12; 24 players – $12,000	1–5 May	(Hong Kong) Chan Sin Yuk; 9–11, 11–5, 9–11, 11–4, 11–5 (8th PSA title)	(Australia) Alex Haydon	(Egypt) Nour Megahed (Barbados) Margot Prow	(Egypt) Ingy Hammouda (France) Kara Lincou (Republic of Ireland) Breanne Flynn (Malaysia) Wen Li Lai
AGL Hunter Singleton Open; Singleton Heights, Australia; Men : Challenger 6; 24 players – $6,000	1–5 May	(Malaysia) Bryan Lim; 3–11, 11–6, 9–11, 11–8, 11–9 (5th PSA title)	(New Zealand) Temwa Chileshe	(Japan) Naoki Hayashi (Australia) Tate Norris	(Australia) David Turner (Australia) Nicholas Calvert (Australia) Benjamin Ratcliffe (Japan) Shota Yasunari
Kiva Club Open; Santa Fe, United States; Men : Challenger 6; 24 players – $6,000	7–11 May	(Colombia) Ronald Palomino; 11–7, 11–7, 11–7 (6th PSA title)	(Guatemala) Luis Quisquinay	(Canada) Connor Turk (Pakistan) Ashab Irfan	(Egypt) Ziad Sakr (Nigeria) Babatunde Ajagbe (Pakistan) Saeed Abdul (Mexico) Luis Aquino
16th CNS International Squash Tournament; Karachi, Pakistan; Men : Challenger 20; 24 players – $20,000	8–12 May	(Egypt) Mohamad Zakaria; 11–13, 11–4, 11–5, 11–7 (4th PSA title)	(Pakistan) Nasir Iqbal	(Pakistan) Tayyab Aslam (Pakistan) Asim Khan	(Pakistan) Noor Zaman (Hong Kong) Tang Ming Hong (Hong Kong) Matthew Lai (Malaysia) Mohd Syafiq Kamal
Bendigo Bank NT Open; Marrara, Australia; Men : Challenger 3; 24 players – $3,000	8–12 May	(Australia) Rhys Dowling; 8–11, 11–8, 11–6, 11–9 (6th PSA title)	(Japan) Naoki Hayashi	(England) Matt Gregory (Pakistan) Mutahir Ali Shah	(Japan) Shota Yasunari (Japan) Yuta Ando (Australia) James Nicholas (Australia) Gregory Chan
The Poona Club Open; Pune, India; Men : Challenger 3; 24 players – $3,000 −−−−−− Women : Challenger 3; 24 players – $3,000	8–12 May	(India) Suraj Chand; 12–14, 11–8, 11–6, 12–10 (2nd PSA title)	(Sri Lanka) Ravindu Laksiri	(India) Diwakar Singh (Sri Lanka) Shamil Wakeel	(India) K. S. Arihant (India) Vedant Patel (Sri Lanka) Nevindu Lakman (Sri Lanka) Tuwin Nilakshana
The Poona Club Open; Pune, India; Men : Challenger 3; 24 players – $3,000 −−−−−− Women : Challenger 3; 24 players – $3,000	8–12 May	(India) Urwashi Joshi; 11–9, 9–11, 11–8, 11–5 (1st PSA title)	(United States) Diya Yadav	(India) Anjali Semwal (India) Sunita Patel	(India) Janet Vidhi (India) Khushi Puranik (India) Vyomika Khandelwal (India) Aryaa Dwivedi
CIB PSA World Championships; Cairo, Egypt; Men : World Championship; 64 players - $550,000 – Draw −−−−−− Women : World Championship; 64 players - $550,000 – Draw	9–18 May	(Peru) Diego Elías; 11–6, 11–5, 12–10 (18th PSA title) (1st World Championship title)	(Egypt) Mostafa Asal	(New Zealand) Paul Coll (Egypt) Ali Farag	(Egypt) Mazen Hesham (England) Mohamed El Shorbagy (Egypt) Tarek Momen (Egypt) Karim Abdel Gawad
CIB PSA World Championships; Cairo, Egypt; Men : World Championship; 64 players - $550,000 – Draw −−−−−− Women : World Championship; 64 players - $550,000 – Draw	9–18 May	(Egypt) Nouran Gohar; 11–8, 9–11, 11–7, 11–5 (26th PSA title) (1st World Championship title)	(Egypt) Nour El Sherbini	(United States) Olivia Weaver (Egypt) Hania El Hammamy	(Egypt) Fayrouz Aboelkheir (Egypt) Rowan Elaraby (Egypt) Nour El Tayeb (Belgium) Tinne Gilis
ECP Open; São Paulo, Brazil; Men : Challenger 9; 24 players – $9,000 −−−−−− Women : Challenger 6; 16 players – $6,000	14–18 May	(Paraguay) Francesco Marcantonio; 11–5, 8–11, 11–13, 11–8, 11–9 (1st PSA title)	(Colombia) Andrés Herrera	(Netherlands) Rowan Damming (Brazil) Diego Gobbi	(Brazil) Pedro Mometto (France) Macéo Lévy (Chile) Matías Lacroix (England) Stuart MacGregor
ECP Open; São Paulo, Brazil; Men : Challenger 9; 24 players – $9,000 −−−−−− Women : Challenger 6; 16 players – $6,000	14–18 May	(Mexico) Sarahí López; 11–9, 11–7, 11–6 (1st PSA title)	(Brazil) Laura Silva	(Colombia) Catalina Peláez (Brazil) Tatiana Borges	(Netherlands) Renske Huntelaar (Paraguay) Fiorella Gatti (Paraguay) Belén Saavedra (Brazil) Giovanna Ambrosio
ACE Challenger 6K; Johor Bahru, Malaysia; Men : Challenger 6; 24 players – $6,000 −−−−−− Women : Challenger 6; 24 players – $6,000	15–19 May	(Egypt) Mohamed Nasser; 12–10, 11–8, 11–7 (1st PSA title)	(Malaysia) Joachim Chuah	(Egypt) Yassin Shohdy (Hong Kong) To Wai Lok	(Malaysia) Hafiz Zhafri (South Korea) Yoo Jae-jin (Hong Kong) Lam Shing Fung (Japan) Shota Yasunari
ACE Challenger 6K; Johor Bahru, Malaysia; Men : Challenger 6; 24 players – $6,000 −−−−−− Women : Challenger 6; 24 players – $6,000	15–19 May	(Egypt) Nour Khafagy; 11–4, 9–11, 11–8, 2–11, 11–8 (1st PSA title)	(Malaysia) Sehveetrraa Kumar	(Malaysia) Thanusaa Uthrian (Hong Kong) Mariko Tam	(Hong Kong) Toby Tse (Hong Kong) Heylie Fung (Hong Kong) Kirstie Wong (Japan) Akari Midorikawa
Barfoot & Thompson Auckland Open; Takapuna, New Zealand; Men : Challenger 3; 24 players – $3,000 −−−−−− Women : Challenger 3; 16 players – $3,000	16–19 May	(New Zealand) Temwa Chileshe; 11–6, 11–8, 8–11, 7–11, 11–7 (2nd PSA title)	(New Zealand) Anthony Lepper	(Australia) Connor Hayes (New Zealand) Mason Smales	(England) Matt Gregory (Australia) Cameron Darton (Malta) Kijan Sultana (New Zealand) Sion Wiggin
Barfoot & Thompson Auckland Open; Takapuna, New Zealand; Men : Challenger 3; 24 players – $3,000 −−−−−− Women : Challenger 3; 16 players – $3,000	16–19 May	(Australia) Madison Lyon; 8–11, 11–7, 11–9, 11–5 (1st PSA title)	(New Zealand) Ella Lash	(New Zealand) Winona-Jo Joyce (New Zealand) Sophie Hodges	(New Zealand) Charlotte Galloway (New Zealand) Jena Gregory (New Zealand) Lily Rae (New Zealand) Kayti Griffen
Clube de Campo das Figueiras Open; Porto Ferreira, Brazil; Men : Challenger 3; 24 players – $3,000 −−−−−− Women : Challenger 3; 16 players – $3,000	22–25 May	(Brazil) Guilherme Melo; 5–11, 11–7, 2–11, 11–5, 11–5 (3rd PSA title)	(Brazil) Pedro Mometto	(Ecuador) Álvaro Buenaño (Ecuador) Javier Romo	(Paraguay) Francesco Marcantonio (Egypt) Sayed Fawzy (Brazil) Gustavo Pizatto (Brazil) Isaias Melo
Clube de Campo das Figueiras Open; Porto Ferreira, Brazil; Men : Challenger 3; 24 players – $3,000 −−−−−− Women : Challenger 3; 16 players – $3,000	22–25 May	(Brazil) Laura Silva; 11–7, 16–14, 4–11, 8–11, 11–8 (1st PSA title)	(Paraguay) Fiorella Gatti	(Ecuador) Caridad Buenaño (Brazil) Luiza Carbonieri	(Brazil) Juliana Pereira (Brazil) Paula Colleoni (Brazil) Giovanna Ambrosio (Paraguay) Belén Saavedra
Manchester Open; Manchester, England; Men : World Tour Silver; 24 players – $75,000 −−−−−− Women : World Tour Silver; 24 players – $75,000	22–26 May	(Wales) Joel Makin; 11–5, 13–11, 12–10 (6th PSA title)	(Scotland) Greg Lobban	(Egypt) Fares Dessouky (Egypt) Youssef Ibrahim	(Egypt) Youssef Soliman (France) Grégoire Marche (Spain) Iker Pajares (England) Nathan Lake
Manchester Open; Manchester, England; Men : World Tour Silver; 24 players – $75,000 −−−−−− Women : World Tour Silver; 24 players – $75,000	22–26 May	(England) Georgina Kennedy; 11–9, 5–11, 11–7, 11–1 (13th PSA title)	(Egypt) Nour El Tayeb	(Egypt) Salma Hany (Egypt) Rowan Elaraby	(United States) Sabrina Sobhy (Japan) Satomi Watanabe (Egypt) Nour Aboulmakarim (England) Saran Nghiem
QSF No.3; Doha, Qatar; Men : World Tour Bronze; 24 players – $53,500	22–26 May	(Egypt) Tarek Momen; 11–6, 11–4, 5–11, 11–5 (10th PSA title)	(Malaysia) Eain Yow	(Switzerland) Dimitri Steinmann (Qatar) Abdulla Al-Tamimi	(Egypt) Aly Abou Eleinen (India) Velavan Senthilkumar (United States) Shahjahan Khan (India) Abhay Singh
HCL Squash Tour – Indore; Indore, India; Men : Challenger 3; 24 players – $3,000 −−−−−− Women : Challenger 3; 24 players – $3,000	22–26 May	(Sri Lanka) Ravindu Laksiri; 11–6, 11–6, 11–4 (3rd PSA title)	(India) Om Semwal	(Sri Lanka) Shamil Wakeel (India) Vedant Patel	(India) K. S. Arihant (India) Diwakar Singh (Kuwait) Bader Almaghrebi (India) Tavneet Mundra
HCL Squash Tour – Indore; Indore, India; Men : Challenger 3; 24 players – $3,000 −−−−−− Women : Challenger 3; 24 players – $3,000	22–26 May	(India) Rathika Seelan; 11–4, 11–6, 11–3 (1st PSA title)	(India) Pooja Arthi	(India) Akanksha Gupta (India) Nirupama Dubey	(Sri Lanka) Yeheni Kuruppu (India) Anjali Semwal (Egypt) Malak Samir (India) Navya Sundararajan
Expression Network Kinetic Women's 30k Boynton Beach, United States; Women : Challenger 30; 24 players – $30,000	26–30 March	(England) Jasmine Hutton; 14–16, 11–8, 11–0, 7–11, 11–7 (8th PSA title)	(France) Mélissa Alves	(France) Énora Villard (Wales) Emily Whitlock	(Ukraine) Alina Bushma (United States) Marina Stefanoni (England) Torrie Malik (Egypt) Nour Megahed
QSF No.4; Doha, Qatar; Men : Challenger 3; 16 players – $3,000	27–30 March	(Kuwait) Mohammad Almasoud; 7–11, 11–8, 11–6, 7–11, 11–6 (1st PSA title)	(Qatar) Yousef Farag	(Iran) Sepehr Etemadpoor (Qatar) Salem Al-Malki	(Bahrain) Yousif Thani (Qatar) Waleed Zaman (Kuwait) Athbi Hamad (Kuwait) Shamlan Ali
HK Squash PSA Challenge Cup - 4th leg Hong Kong, China; Men : Challenger 6; 24 players - $6,000 −−−−−− Women : Challenger 6; 24 players - $6,000	28 May – 1 Jun.	(Malaysia) Joachim Chuah; 11–6, 11–6, 11–4 (1st PSA title)	(Hong Kong) Harley Lam	(Hong Kong) Lam Shing Fung (Hong Kong) Andes Ling	(Hong Kong) Tang Ming Hong (Hong Kong) To Wai Lok (South Korea) Lee Min-woo (Malaysia) Duncan Lee
HK Squash PSA Challenge Cup - 4th leg Hong Kong, China; Men : Challenger 6; 24 players - $6,000 −−−−−− Women : Challenger 6; 24 players - $6,000	28 May – 1 Jun.	(Malaysia) Sehveetrraa Kumar; 11–7, 11–4, 11–3 (2nd PSA title)	(Hong Kong) Heylie Fung	(Malaysia) Thanusaa Uthrian (Hong Kong) Ena Kwong	(Hong Kong) Kirstie Wong (Hong Kong) Armona Cheung (India) Rathika Seelan (Malaysia) Anrie Goh
Women's Mozart Open; Salzburg, Austria; Women : Challenger 6; 24 players – $6,000	28 May – 1 Jun.	(England) Saran Nghiem; 13–11, 11–5, 6–11, 11–7 (5th PSA title)	(Scotland) Alison Thomson	(England) Kiera Marshall (Czech Republic) Michaela Cepová	(Switzerland) Ambre Allinckx (Czech Republic) Karolína Šrámková (France) Kara Lincou (England) Mariam Eissa
25th Atlanta Open; Sandy Springs, United States; Men : Challenger 12; 24 players – $12,000	29 May – 2 Jun.	(Guatemala) Alejandro Enríquez; 11–7, 11–6, 11–2 (4th PSA title)	(Egypt) Zahed Salem	(United States) Nicholas Spizzirri (Pakistan) Ashab Irfan	(Canada) Connor Turk (Germany) Jan Wipperfürth (United States) Christopher Gordon (Mexico) César Segundo
Cooper Fluid System Golden Open; Kalgoorlie, Australia; Men : Challenger 6; 16 players – $6,000 −−−−−− Women : Challenger 6; 16 players – $6,000	30 May – 2 Jun.	(New Zealand) Joel Arscott; 11–4, 11–4, 11–6 (1st PSA title)	(Czech Republic) Ondřej Vorlíček	(Netherlands) Rowan Damming (Australia) Nicholas Calvert	(Australia) Benjamin Ratcliffe (Australia) Mike Corren (Chile) Lucas Pérez (Hong Kong) Arthur Law
Cooper Fluid System Golden Open; Kalgoorlie, Australia; Men : Challenger 6; 16 players – $6,000 −−−−−− Women : Challenger 6; 16 players – $6,000	30 May – 2 Jun.	(Norway) Madeleine Hylland; 9–11, 11–5, 11–6, 11–8 (1st PSA title)	(India) Urwashi Joshi	(Australia) Madison Lyon (Japan) Risa Sugimoto	(Australia) Sarah Cardwell (Malaysia) Shasmithaa Nityanandan (Australia) Remashree Muniandy (Japan) Erisa Sano

=== June ===
Tournament	Date	Champion	Runner-Up	Semifinalists	Quarterfinalists
Men's Mozart Open; Salzburg, Austria; Women : Challenger 6; 24 players – $6,000	4–8 June	(Wales) Rhys Evans; 11–9, 6–11, 11–6, 17–15 (2nd PSA title)	(Austria) Aqeel Rehman	(Egypt) Khaled Labib (England) Robert Downer	(Switzerland) Robin Gadola (Germany) Valentin Rapp (England) Jared Carter (Egypt) Omar El Torkey
HCL Squash Tour – Chennai; Chennai, India; Men : Challenger 3; 24 players – $3,000 −−−−−− Women : Challenger 3; 24 players – $3,000	4–8 June	(Sri Lanka) Ravindu Laksiri w/o (4th PSA title)	(India) Rahul Baitha	(India) Ravi Dixit (Qatar) Yousef Farag	(India) Tushar Shahani (India) Guhan Senthilkumar (India) Adarsh Banodha (India) Kanhav Nanavati
HCL Squash Tour – Chennai; Chennai, India; Men : Challenger 3; 24 players – $3,000 −−−−−− Women : Challenger 3; 24 players – $3,000	4–8 June	(India) Anahat Singh; 11–5, 11–3, 11–3 (3rd PSA title)	(India) Rathika Seelan	(Sri Lanka) Yeheni Kuruppu (India) Janet Vidhi	(India) Pooja Arthi (India) Sunita Patel (India) Trina Iris (India) Shameena Riaz
Harcourts KDRE Morrinsville PSA Challenger; Morrinsville, New Zealand; Men : Challenger 3; 16 players – $3,000	5–8 June	(New Zealand) Temwa Chileshe; 11–4, 11–6, 11–8 (3rd PSA title)	(New Zealand) Mason Smales	(New Zealand) Oliver Dunbar (Australia) Lachlan Coxsedge	(New Zealand) Joe Williams (New Zealand) Willz Donnelly (New Zealand) Allan Bailey (New Zealand) Glenn Templeton
Open Costa Brava Squash Project; Santa Cristina d'Aro, Spain; Men : Challenger 3; 24 players – $3,000 −−−−−− Women : Challenger 3; 24 players - $3,000	5–8 June	(United States) Hollis Robertson; 9–11, 11–3, 11–5, 12–10 (1st PSA title)	(Republic of Ireland) Denis Gilevskiy	(Canada) Syan Singh (England) Sam Osborne-Wylde	(Scotland) Rory Richmond (France) Matteo Carrouget (Colombia) Mateo Restrepo (Spain) Ernesto Revert
Open Costa Brava Squash Project; Santa Cristina d'Aro, Spain; Men : Challenger 3; 24 players – $3,000 −−−−−− Women : Challenger 3; 24 players - $3,000	5–8 June	(Italy) Cristina Tartarone; 11–9, 11–5, 11–9 (1st PSA title)	(France) Kara Lincou	(Croatia) Franka Vidović (Spain) Ona Blasco	(Spain) Noa Romero (Poland) Sofi Zrazhevska (England) Jasmin Kalar (Netherlands) Juliette Permentier
British Open; Birmingham, England; Men : World Tour Platinum; 48 players – $194,500 – Draw −−−−−− Women : World Tour Platinum; 48 players – $194,500 – Draw	2–9 June	(Egypt) Mostafa Asal; 11–5, 2–11, 13–11, 4–11, 12–10 (15th PSA title)	(Egypt) Ali Farag	(New Zealand) Paul Coll (Wales) Joel Makin	(Peru) Diego Elías (United States) Timothy Brownell (Egypt) Mazen Hesham (Malaysia) Eain Yow
British Open; Birmingham, England; Men : World Tour Platinum; 48 players – $194,500 – Draw −−−−−− Women : World Tour Platinum; 48 players – $194,500 – Draw	2–9 June	(Egypt) Nouran Gohar; 11–6, 17–15, 3–11, 7–11, 11–4 (27th PSA title)	(Egypt) Nour El Sherbini	(Egypt) Nour El Tayeb (Egypt) Hania El Hammamy	(Egypt) Salma Hany (United States) Olivia Weaver (Belgium) Tinne Gilis (England) Georgina Kennedy
WA Open; Mirrabooka, Australia; Men : Challenger 6; 24 players - $6,000 −−−−−− Women : Challenger 6; 24 players - $6,000	5–9 June	(Malaysia) Joachim Chuah; 12–10, 7–11, 11–8, 11–6 (2nd PSA title)	(Australia) Joseph White	(Netherlands) Rowan Damming (New Zealand) Joel Arscott	(Australia) Rhys Dowling (Australia) Nicholas Calvert (Australia) Benjamin Ratcliffe (Czech Republic) Ondřej Vorlíček
WA Open; Mirrabooka, Australia; Men : Challenger 6; 24 players - $6,000 −−−−−− Women : Challenger 6; 24 players - $6,000	5–9 June	(Australia) Alex Haydon; 11–4, 5–11, 6–11, 14–12, 11–6 (2nd PSA title)	(Australia) Sarah Cardwell	(Australia) Sophie Fadaely (Australia) Madison Lyon	(India) Urwashi Joshi (Australia) Erin Classen (Norway) Madeleine Hylland (Malaysia) Shasmithaa Nityanandan
PSA Club Campestre de Cali; Cali, Colombia; Men : Challenger 30; 24 players - $30,000	12–16 June	(Colombia) Miguel Á Rodríguez; 11–7, 11–4, 9–11, 11–6 (31st PSA title)	(Mexico) Leonel Cárdenas	(Egypt) Yahya Elnawasany (Mexico) Alfredo Ávila	(Egypt) Moustafa El Sirty (Guatemala) Alejandro Enríquez (Argentina) Jeremías Azaña (England) Tom Walsh
Investimax Brussels Open; Brussels, Belgium; Women : Challenger 3; 24 players – $3,000	13–16 June	(South Africa) Hayley Ward; 11–7, 11–7, 11–6 (1st PSA title)	(England) Kiera Marshall	(Scotland) Robyn McAlpine (France) Kara Lincou	(Spain) Sofía Mateos (Republic of Ireland) Breanne Flynn (England) Polly Clark (England) Olivia Besant
PSA World Tour Finals; Bellevue, United States; Men : World Tour Finals; 8 players – $224,500 – Draw −−−−−− Women : World Tour Finals; 8 players – $224,500 – Draw	18–22 June	(Egypt) Ali Farag; 11–5, 5–2^{rtd.} (1st PSA Finals title) (41st PSA title)	(Egypt) Mostafa Asal	(New Zealand) Paul Coll (Egypt) Tarek Momen	Round Robin: (Egypt) Mazen Hesham (Egypt) Karim Abdel Gawad (England) Mohamed El Shorbagy (Peru) Diego Elías
PSA World Tour Finals; Bellevue, United States; Men : World Tour Finals; 8 players – $224,500 – Draw −−−−−− Women : World Tour Finals; 8 players – $224,500 – Draw	18–22 June	(Egypt) Nouran Gohar; 7–11, 11–2, 11–9, 11–10 (3rd PSA Finals title) (28th PSA title)	(Egypt) Nour El Sherbini	(Egypt) Hania El Hammamy (Belgium) Nele Gilis	Round Robin: (United States) Olivia Weaver (England) Georgina Kennedy (Egypt) Nour El Tayeb (Belgium) Tinne Gilis
Open International Vendée; Challans, France; Men : Challenger 6; 24 players - $6,000	18–22 June	(Egypt) Mohamed Nasser; 12–10, 11–5, 11–9 (2nd PSA title)	(France) Joshua Phinéra	(Egypt) Mohamed Gohar (France) Laszlo Godde	(France) Baptiste Bouin (France) Macéo Lévy (France) Manuel Paquemar (Egypt) Yusuf Elsherif
Gibraltar Open; Gibraltar; Men : Challenger 6; 24 players – $6,000 −−−−−− Women : Challenger 6; 24 players – $6,000	19–23 June	(Egypt) Moustafa El Sirty; 12–10, 10–12, 11–9, 11–7 (17th PSA title)	(Italy) Yuri Farneti	(Wales) Rhys Evans (Liechtenstein) David Maier	(Spain) Nilo Vidal (Colombia) Mateo Restrepo (Chile) José Gallegos (Germany) Jan Wipperfürth
Gibraltar Open; Gibraltar; Men : Challenger 6; 24 players – $6,000 −−−−−− Women : Challenger 6; 24 players – $6,000	19–23 June	(Egypt) Barb Sameh; 11–5, 11–6, 11–4 (1st PSA title)	(Republic of Ireland) Breanne Flynn	(Germany) Katerina Týcová (France) Kara Lincou	(Spain) Sofía Mateos (England) Amelie Haworth (Spain) Ona Blasco (Czech Republic) Karolína Šrámková
Skillzea Open; Dunedin, New Zealand; Men : Challenger 6; 24 players – $6,000	19–23 June	(New Zealand) Elijah Thomas; 11–8, 11–8, 11–3 (2nd PSA title)	(New Zealand) Lwamba Chileshe	(New Zealand) Temwa Chileshe (Egypt) Adam Hawal	(Netherlands) Sam Gerrits (New Zealand) Anthony Lepper (New Zealand) Joel Arscott (Australia) Benjamin Ratcliffe
Life Time Mississauga Challenger; Mississauga, Canada; Men : Challenger 3; 24 players - $3,000	19–23 June	(Canada) Liam Marrison; 7–11, 11–8, 9–11, 11–8, 11–4 (1st PSA title)	(Egypt) Mohamed Nabil	(Canada) Wasey Maqsood (Nigeria) Babatunde Ajagbe	(Canada) Mohammadreza Jafarzadeh (Hong Kong) Akifumi Murakami (Canada) Syan Singh (Canada) Amin Khan
University Of Warwick Open; Coventry, England; Men : Challenger 3; 16 players – $3,000	20–23 June	(Republic of Ireland) Sam Buckley; 11–8, 11–2, 12–14, 11–7 (1st PSA title)	(England) Sam Osborne-Wylde	(England) Miles Jenkins (England) Heston Malik	(England) Lewis Doughty (England) Anthony Rogal (England) Lewis Anderson (Scotland) Rory Richmond
Dynam Cup SQ-Cube Open; Yokohama, Japan; Men : Challenger 15; 24 players – $15,000 −−−−−− Women : Challenger 6; 24 players – $6,000	26–30 June	(Japan) Ryūnosuke Tsukue; 11–8, 3–11, 9–11, 11–8, 11–6 (10th PSA title)	(Egypt) Kareem El Torkey	(Malaysia) Addeen Idrakie (France) Lucas Serme	(Malaysia) Ameeshenraj Chandaran (Malaysia) Mohd Syafiq Kamal (Egypt) Khaled Labib (South Korea) Ryu Jeong-min
Dynam Cup SQ-Cube Open; Yokohama, Japan; Men : Challenger 15; 24 players – $15,000 −−−−−− Women : Challenger 6; 24 players – $6,000	26–30 June	(India) Anahat Singh w/o (4th PSA title)	(Egypt) Ruqayya Salem	(South Korea) Heo Min-gyeong (Japan) Risa Sugimoto	(Macau) Gigi Yeung (Singapore) Wai Yhann Au Yeong (Czech Republic) Anna Serme (South Korea) Lee Ji-hyun
PSNS President's Trophy; Seri Menanti, Malaysia; Men : Challenger 6; 24 players – $6,000 −−−−−− Women : Challenger 6; 24 players – $6,000	26–30 June	(Malaysia) Darren Pragasam; 11–6, 11–7, 11–6 (3rd PSA title)	(Egypt) Ziad Ibrahim	(Malaysia) Joachim Chuah (Malaysia) Andrik Lim	(Malaysia) Duncan Lee (Malaysia) Hafiz Zhafri (Hong Kong) Lam Shing Fung (Iran) Sepehr Etemadpoor
PSNS President's Trophy; Seri Menanti, Malaysia; Men : Challenger 6; 24 players – $6,000 −−−−−− Women : Challenger 6; 24 players – $6,000	26–30 June	(Malaysia) Sehveetrraa Kumar; 11–4, 11–13, 11–8, 10–12, 11–6 (3rd PSA title)	(Malaysia) Heng Wai Wong	(Malaysia) Jessica Keng (Malaysia) Chen Yu Jie	(Malaysia) Puteri Rania (Malaysia) Shasmithaa Nityanandan (Malaysia) Nurul Nazir (Malaysia) Aika Azman
Trident Homes South Island Open; Christchurch, New Zealand; Men : Challenger 6; 24 players – $6,000 −−−−−− Women : Challenger 3; 16 players – $3,000	26–30 June	(Netherlands) Rowan Damming; 13–11, 11–8, 11–9 (5th PSA title)	(New Zealand) Elijah Thomas	(New Zealand) Temwa Chileshe (Egypt) Adam Hawal	(Netherlands) Sam Gerrits (New Zealand) Joel Arscott (Australia) Benjamin Ratcliffe (Australia) Remi Young
Trident Homes South Island Open; Christchurch, New Zealand; Men : Challenger 6; 24 players – $6,000 −−−−−− Women : Challenger 3; 16 players – $3,000	26–30 June	(Norway) Madeleine Hylland; 11–5, 11–8, 8–11, 11–6 (2nd PSA title)	(Wales) Lowri Roberts	(New Zealand) Winona-Jo Joyce (New Zealand) Ella Lash	(New Zealand) Jena Gregory (New Zealand) Sophie Hodges (New Zealand) Kayti Griffen (New Zealand) Emma Cormach
City of Greater Bendigo International; Bendigo, Australia; Men : Challenger 3; 24 players – $3,000 −−−−−− Women : Challenger 3; 16 players – $3,000	27–30 June	(Pakistan) Nasir Iqbal; 11–4, 11–9, 11–1 (14th PSA title)	(France) Matteo Carrouget	(Australia) Gianluca Bushell-O'Connor (Hong Kong) Lap Man Au	(Australia) Tate Norris (Australia) Brendan MacDonald (Australia) Caleb Johnson (Australia) David Turner
City of Greater Bendigo International; Bendigo, Australia; Men : Challenger 3; 24 players – $3,000 −−−−−− Women : Challenger 3; 16 players – $3,000	27–30 June	(Australia) Erin Classen; 9–11, 11–6, 11–4, 11–2 (2nd PSA title)	(Sri Lanka) Chanithma Sinaly	(Australia) Pascale Louka (Australia) Carina Loi	(Australia) Courtney Scholtz (Pakistan) Noor-ul-Huda (Australia) Joanne Joseph (Pakistan) Noor-ul-Ain Ijaz

=== July ===
Tournament	Date	Champion	Runner-Up	Semifinalists	Quarterfinalists
Kanso Men Open; Houston, United States; Men : Challenger 9; 24 players – $9,000	3–7 July	(Pakistan) Ashab Irfan; 11–7, 8–11, 12–10, 8–11, 11–8 (2nd PSA title)	(India) Veer Chotrani	(Mexico) Alfredo Ávila (Canada) Liam Marrison	(Pakistan) Ahsan Ayaz (Mexico) Jorge Gómez (Egypt) Mohamed Nabil (Mexico) Alejandro Reyes
Berkhamsted Linksap Open; Berkhamsted, England; Men : Challenger 6; 16 players – $6,000 −−−−−− Women : Challenger 6; 16 players – $6,000	4–7 July	(Wales) Owain Taylor; 11–9, 8–11, 4–11, 11–4, 13–11 (2nd PSA title)	(England) Sam Osborne-Wylde	(England) Jared Carter (England) Perry Malik	(England) Anthony Rogal (England) Noah Meredith (England) Miles Jenkins (Republic of Ireland) Aaron Allpress
Berkhamsted Linksap Open; Berkhamsted, England; Men : Challenger 6; 16 players – $6,000 −−−−−− Women : Challenger 6; 16 players – $6,000	4–7 July	(Egypt) Hana Ismail; 13–11, 11–8, 11–9 (4th PSA title)	(England) Saran Nghiem	(England) Isabel McCullough (Portugal) Sofia Aveiro	(England) Olivia Besant (Wales) Ali Loke (England) Amelie Haworth (Slovenia) Nika Urh
City of Greater Shepparton International; Shepparton, Australia; Men : Challenger 3; 24 players – $3,000 −−−−−− Women : Challenger 3; 24 players – $3,000	4–7 July	(Pakistan) Nasir Iqbal; 11–9, 11–9, 11–6 (15th PSA title)	(France) Matteo Carrouget	(Australia) Tate Norris (Canada) Elliott Hunt	(Australia) Benjamin Ratcliffe (Australia) Javed Ali (Australia) Remi Young (Pakistan) Israr Ahmed
City of Greater Shepparton International; Shepparton, Australia; Men : Challenger 3; 24 players – $3,000 −−−−−− Women : Challenger 3; 24 players – $3,000	4–7 July	(Macau) Gigi Yeung; 7–11, 13–11, 11–8, 11–7 (1st PSA title)	(Norway) Madeleine Hylland	(India) Urwashi Joshi (Australia) Pascale Louka	(Macau) Yeung Wai Leng (Australia) Sophie Fadaely (Egypt) Layla Sameh (Pakistan) Noor-ul-Huda
2nd Cay Open; São Paulo, Brazil; Men : Challenger 3; 16 players – $3,000	10–13 July	(Brazil) Diego Gobbi; 11–4, 11–8, 11–2 (3rd PSA title)	(Brazil) Rhuan Sousa	(Brazil) Gabriel Pederiva (Brazil) Yuri Pollak	(Brazil) Gustavo Pizatto (Brazil) Matheus Carbonieri (Brazil) Lucas Araújo (Brazil) Murilo Penteado
Victorian Open; Wheelers Hill, Australia; Men : Challenger 6; 24 players – $6,000 ------ Women : Challenger 6; 24 players – $6,000	10–14 July	(France) Melvil Scianimanico; 11–5, 11–6, 9–11, 11–6 (1st PSA title)	(Malaysia) Bryan Lim	(Pakistan) Nasir Iqbal (Australia) Dylan Molinaro	(Japan) Naoki Hayashi (Switzerland) Robin Gadola (Australia) Tate Norris (Japan) Tomotaka Endo
Victorian Open; Wheelers Hill, Australia; Men : Challenger 6; 24 players – $6,000 ------ Women : Challenger 6; 24 players – $6,000	10–14 July	(Norway) Madeleine Hylland; 11–8, 6–11, 5–11, 11–9, 11–4 (3rd PSA title)	(Egypt) Amina El Rihany	(Australia) Sarah Cardwell (Australia) Remashree Muniandy	(Australia) Erin Classen (India) Urwashi Joshi (South Korea) Lee Ji-hyun (Australia) Sophie Fadaely
ACE Challenger 6K - 2nd leg Kerteh, Malaysia; Men : Challenger 6; 24 players – $6,000 −−−−−− Women : Challenger 6; 24 players – $6,000	10–14 July	(Egypt) Yassin Shohdy; 11–4, 11–8, 11–7 (2nd PSA title)	(Malaysia) Mohd Syafiq Kamal	(Malaysia) Duncan Lee (Sri Lanka) Ravindu Laksiri	(Egypt) Mohamed Gohar (South Korea) Ryu Jeong-min (England) James Peach (Egypt) Yehia Essam
ACE Challenger 6K - 2nd leg Kerteh, Malaysia; Men : Challenger 6; 24 players – $6,000 −−−−−− Women : Challenger 6; 24 players – $6,000	10–14 July	(Malaysia) Yee Xin Ying; 11–8, 11–3, 11–8 (4th PSA title)	(Malaysia) Sehveetrraa Kumar	(Egypt) Habiba Hani (Egypt) Malak Fathy	(Egypt) Barb Sameh (Egypt) Nour Khafagy (Singapore) Wai Yhann Au Yeong (Philippines) Jemyca Aribado
Life Time Clemens Johns Creek; Johns Creek, United States; Men : Challenger 12; 24 players – $12,000	17–21 July	(Pakistan) Asim Khan; 7–11, 11–7, 11–4, 11–4 (10th PSA title)	(Pakistan) Ashab Irfan	(Nigeria) Onaopemipo Adegoke (United States) Nicholas Spizzirri	(United States) Shahjahan Khan (India) Abhishek Agarwal (Egypt) Abdelrahman Nassar (Malaysia) Siow Yee Xian
City of Devonport Tasmanian Open; Devonport, Australia; Men : Challenger 9; 24 players - $9,000	17–21 July	(Pakistan) Nasir Iqbal; 11–8, 12–10, 6–11, 11–5 (16th PSA title)	(Switzerland) David Bernet	(Malaysia) Bryan Lim (France) Melvil Scianimanico	(Switzerland) Robin Gadola (Australia) Rhys Dowling (Australia) Dylan Molinaro (Egypt) Louai Hafez
Bremer Schlüssel; Achim, Germany; Men : Challenger 15; 24 players – $15,000	23–27 July	(Egypt) Ibrahim Elkabbani; 11–4, 4–11, 11–3, 11–7 (7th PSA title)	(Guatemala) Alejandro Enríquez	(Egypt) Mazen Gamal (Egypt) Yassin ElShafei	(Egypt) Khaled Labib (Egypt) Hazem Hossam (Netherlands) Rowan Damming (Wales) Owain Taylor
Eastside Open; Bellerive, Australia; Men : Challenger 3; 24 players – $3,000	24–28 July	(Switzerland) Robin Gadola; 11–8, 11–5, 11–6 (2nd PSA title)	(Switzerland) David Bernet	(France) Melvil Scianimanico (Switzerland) Louai Hafez	(France) Titouan Isambard (Switzerland) Miguel Mathis (Malta) Kijan Sultana (Switzerland) Sven Stettler
Charleston Challenge; Charleston, United States; Men : Challenger 3; 24 players – $3,000	25–28 July	(United States) Nicholas Spizzirri; 11–5, 12–10, 11–7 (1st PSA title)	(Malaysia) Siow Yee Xian	(India) Abhishek Agarwal (Egypt) Abdelrahman Nassar	(Egypt) Omar Elkattan (Bermuda) Taylor Carrick (United States) Hollis Robertson (England) Mark Broekman
Volkswagen Bega Open; Bega, Australia; Men : Challenger 12; 24 players – $12,000 −−−−−− Women : Challenger 12; 24 players – $12,000	31 Jul. – 4 Aug.	(Pakistan) Nasir Iqbal; 11–6, 11–1, 11–3 (17th PSA title)	(Hong Kong) Matthew Lai	(Malaysia) Bryan Lim (Switzerland) Robin Gadola	(Switzerland) David Bernet (Australia) Brendan MacDonald (Australia) Rhys Dowling (Japan) Tomotaka Endo
Volkswagen Bega Open; Bega, Australia; Men : Challenger 12; 24 players – $12,000 −−−−−− Women : Challenger 12; 24 players – $12,000	31 Jul. – 4 Aug.	(Hong Kong) Cheng Nga Ching; 11–4, 11–5, 9–11, 11–7 (5th PSA title)	(Australia) Sophie Fadaely	(Australia) Madison Lyon (Japan) Erisa Sano	(Australia) Rachael Grinham (South Africa) Hayley Ward (Australia) Erin Classen (Australia) Sarah Cardwell

== Statistical information ==
The players/nations are sorted by:

1. Total number of titles;
2. Cumulated importance of those titles;
3. Alphabetical order (by family names for players).

=== Key ===
World Championship
World Tour Platinum
World Tour Gold
World Tour Silver
World Tour Bronze
Challenger Tour 3/6/9/12/15/20/30

=== Titles won by player (men's) ===
Total	Player	World Ch. / PSA Finals	Platinum	Gold	Silver	Bronze	Challenger 30	Challenger 20	Challenger 15	Challenger 12	Challenger 9	Challenger 6	Challenger 3
8	Ali Farag (EGY)	●	●●●●●	●●									
6	Jonah Bryant (ENG)							●	●		●		●●●
5	Paul Coll (NZL)		●●	●●	●								
4	Mohamad Zakaria (EGY)							●	●		●	●	
4	Nasir Iqbal (PAK)									●	●		●●
4	Kareem El Torkey (EGY)									●		●●	●
3	Diego Elías (PER)	●			●●								
3	Mostafa Asal (EGY)		●	●●									
3	Karim Abdel Gawad (EGY)			●	●	●							
3	Abdulla Al-Tamimi (QAT)					●	●●						
3	Ibrahim Elkabbani (EGY)								●●●				
3	Moustafa El Sirty (EGY)								●	●		●	
3	Alejandro Enríquez (GUA)									●●		●	
3	Veer Chotrani (IND)									●	●	●	
3	Asim Khan (PAK)									●	●		●
3	Salah Eltorgman (CAN)										●●		●
3	Omar El Torkey (EGY)											●	●●
3	Ronald Palomino (COL)											●	●●
2	Tarek Momen (EGY)					●●							
2	Youssef Soliman (EGY)					●●							
2	Ryūnosuke Tsukue (JPN)								●	●			
2	Declan James (ENG)									●●			
2	Curtis Malik (ENG)									●●			
2	Velavan Senthilkumar (IND)									●		●	
2	Ashab Irfan (PAK)										●●		
2	Matías Knudsen (COL)										●	●	
2	Matthew Lai (HKG)										●	●	
2	Stuart MacGregor (ENG)										●		●
2	Abhay Singh (IND)										●		●
2	Joachim Chuah (MYS)											●●	
2	Bryan Lim (MYS)											●●	
2	Mohamed Nasser (EGY)											●●	
2	Elijah Thomas (NZL)											●●	
2	Rhys Dowling (AUS)											●	●
2	Rhys Evans (WAL)											●	●
2	Diego Gobbi (BRA)											●	●
2	Darren Pragasam (MYS)											●	●
2	Yassin Shohdy (EGY)											●	●
2	Suraj Chand (IND)												●●
2	Temwa Chileshe (NZL)												●●
2	Ravindu Laksiri (SRI)												●●
2	Guilherme Melo (BRA)												●●
1	Joel Makin (WAL)				●								
1	Leonel Cárdenas (MEX)					●							
1	Aly Abou Eleinen (EGY)					●							
1	Eain Yow (MYS)					●							
1	Mohamed ElSherbini (EGY)						●						
1	Baptiste Masotti (FRA)						●						
1	Miguel Á Rodríguez (COL)						●						
1	Patrick Rooney (ENG)						●						
1	Nick Wall (ENG)						●						
1	David Baillargeon (CAN)							●					
1	Greg Lobban (SCO)							●					
1	Iker Pajares (ESP)							●					
1	Leandro Romiglio (ARG)							●					
1	Adrian Waller (ENG)							●					
1	Ameeshenraj Chandaran (MYS)								●				
1	Andrew Douglas (USA)								●				
1	Emyr Evans (WAL)								●				
1	Aly Hussein (EGY)								●				
1	Bernat Jaume (ESP)								●				
1	Faraz Khan (USA)								●				
1	Addeen Idrakie (MYS)									●			
1	Sanjay Jeeva (MYS)									●			
1	Raphael Kandra (GER)									●			
1	Edmon López (ESP)									●			
1	Daniel Poleshchuk (ISR)									●			
1	Juan Camilo Vargas (COL)									●			
1	Noor Zaman (PAK)									●			
1	Francesco Marcantonio (PAR)										●		
1	Tom Walsh (ENG)										●		
1	Finnlay Withington (ENG)										●		
1	Joel Arscott (NZL)											●	
1	Alfredo Ávila (MEX)											●	
1	Wong Chi Him (HKG)											●	
1	George Crowne (CAN)											●	
1	Rowan Damming (NED)											●	
1	Yassin ElShafei (EGY)											●	
1	Jorge Gómez (MEX)											●	
1	Mahesh Mangaonkar (IND)											●	
1	Abdelrahman Nassar (EGY)											●	
1	Brice Nicolas (FRA)											●	
1	Iván Pérez (ESP)											●	
1	Melvil Scianimanico (FRA)											●	
1	Jakub Solnický (CZE)											●	
1	Owain Taylor (WAL)											●	
1	Yannick Wilhelmi (SUI)											●	
1	Onaopemipo Adegoke (NGR)												●
1	Mohammad Almasoud (KUW)												●
1	Ammar Al-Tamimi (KUW)												●
1	Rahul Baitha (IND)												●
1	Sam Buckley (IRE)												●
1	Robin Gadola (SUI)												●
1	Andes Ling (HKG)												●
1	Liam Marrison (CAN)												●
1	Daniel Mekbib (CZE)												●
1	Pedro Mometto (BRA)												●
1	Gabriel Olufunmilayo (NGR)												●
1	Yannik Omlor (GER)												●
1	Aqeel Rehman (AUT)												●
1	Hollis Robertson (USA)												●
1	Sebastián Salazar (MEX)												●
1	Nicholas Spizzirri (USA)												●
1	Dewald van Niekerk (RSA)												●

=== Titles won by nation (men's) ===
Total	Nation	World Ch. / PSA Finals	Platinum	Gold	Silver	Bronze	Challenger 30	Challenger 20	Challenger 15	Challenger 12	Challenger 9	Challenger 6	Challenger 3
44	Egypt (EGY)	●	●●●●●●	●●●●●	●	●●●●●●	●	●	●●●●●●	●●	●	●●●●●●●●●●	●●●●
17	England (ENG)						●●	●●	●	●●●●	●●●●		●●●●
11	India (IND)									●●	●●	●●●	●●●●
10	New Zealand (NZL)		●●	●●	●							●●●	●●
10	Malaysia (MYS)					●			●	●●		●●●●●	●
10	Pakistan (PAK)									●●●	●●●●		●●●
7	Colombia (COL)						●			●	●	●●	●●
6	Canada (CAN)							●			●●	●	●●
5	Wales (WAL)				●				●			●●	●
5	Brazil (BRA)											●	●●●●
4	Mexico (MEX)					●						●●	●
4	Spain (ESP)							●	●	C		●	
4	United States (USA)								●●				●●
4	Hong Kong (HKG)										●	●●	●
3	Peru (PER)	●			●●								
3	Qatar (QAT)					●	●●						
3	France (FRA)						●					●●	
3	Guatemala (GUA)									●●		●	
2	Japan (JPN)								●	●			
2	Germany (GER)									●			●
2	Australia (AUS)											●	●
2	Czech Republic (CZE)											●	●
2	Switzerland (SUI)											●	●
2	Kuwait (KUW)												●●
2	Nigeria (NGR)												●●
2	Sri Lanka (SRI)												●●
1	Argentina (ARG)							●					
1	Scotland (SCO)							●					
1	Israel (ISR)									●			
1	Paraguay (PAR)										●		
1	Netherlands (NED)											●	
1	Austria (AUT)												●
1	Ireland (IRE)												●
1	South Africa (RSA)												●

=== Titles won by player (women's) ===
Total	Player	World Ch. / PSA Finals	Platinum	Gold	Silver	Bronze	Challenger 30	Challenger 20	Challenger 15	Challenger 12	Challenger 9	Challenger 6	Challenger 3
6	Nour El Sherbini (EGY)		●●●●	●●									
5	Nouran Gohar (EGY)	●●	●●	●									
4	Hana Ismail (EGY)											●	●●●
4	Anahat Singh (IND)											●	●●●
4	Menna Walid (EGY)												●●●●
3	Nour El Tayeb (EGY)			●	●	●							
3	Sivasangari Subramaniam (MYS)			●		●			●				
3	Farida Mohamed (EGY)					●		●●					
3	Rana Ismail (EGY)								●		●	●	
3	Yee Xin Ying (MYS)										●	●●	
3	Sehveetrraa Kumar (MYS)											●●●	
3	Madeleine Hylland (NOR)											●●	●
2	Hania El Hammamy (EGY)		●●										
2	Nele Gilis (BEL)			●	●								
2	Olivia Weaver (USA)				●●								
2	Georgina Kennedy (ENG)				●	●							
2	Jasmine Hutton (ENG)						●	●					
2	Malak Khafagy (EGY)							●		●			
2	Nardine Garas (EGY)								●	●			
2	Alicia Mead (ENG)								●	●			
2	Marina Stefanoni (USA)								●		●		
2	Saran Nghiem (ENG)								●			●	
2	Cheng Nga Ching (HKG)									●		●	
2	Margot Prow (BAR)									●			●
2	Torrie Malik (ENG)										●	●	
2	Amina El Rihany (EGY)											●●	
2	Alison Thomson (SCO)											●	●
2	Toby Tse (HKG)											●	●
1	Salma Hany (EGY)					●							
1	Amina Orfi (EGY)					●							
1	Satomi Watanabe (JPN)					●							
1	Menna Hamed (EGY)						●						
1	Nada Abbas (EGY)							●					
1	Georgia Adderley (SCO)							●					
1	Hollie Naughton (CAN)							●					
1	Lucy Turmel (ENG)							●					
1	Grace Gear (ENG)									●			
1	Habiba Hani (EGY)									●			
1	Tanvi Khanna (IND)									●			
1	Katie Malliff (ENG)									●			
1	Chan Sin Yuk (HKG)									●			
1	Haya Ali (EGY)										●		
1	Nour Heikal (EGY)										●		
1	Chan Yiwen (MYS)										●		
1	Nadien Elhammamy (EGY)											●	
1	Alex Haydon (AUS)											●	
1	Nour Khafagy (EGY)											●	
1	Sarahí López (MEX)											●	
1	Nour Megahed (EGY)											●	
1	Akanksha Salunkhe (IND)											●	
1	Barb Sameh (EGY)											●	
1	Jessica Turnbull (AUS)											●	
1	Pooja Arthi (IND)												●
1	Wai Yhann Au Yeong (SGP)												●
1	Michaela Cepová (CZE)												●
1	Erin Classen (AUS)												●
1	Diana García (MEX)												●
1	Asia Harris (ENG)												●
1	Urwashi Joshi (IND)												●
1	Madison Lyon (AUS)												●
1	Olatunji Busayo (NGR)												●
1	Rathika Seelan (IND)												●
1	Laura Silva (BRA)												●
1	Cristina Tartarone (ITA)												●
1	Hayley Ward (RSA)												●
1	Gigi Yeung (MAC)												●

=== Titles won by nation (women's) ===
Total	Nation	World Ch. / PSA Finals	Platinum	Gold	Silver	Bronze	Challenger 30	Challenger 20	Challenger 15	Challenger 12	Challenger 9	Challenger 6	Challenger 3
47	Egypt (EGY)	●●	●●●●●●●●	●●●●	●	●●●●	●	●●●●	●●	●●●	●●●	●●●●●●●●	●●●●●●●
14	England (ENG)				●	●	●	●●	●●	●●●	●	●●	●
10	Malaysia (MYS)			●		●			●		●●	●●●●●	
9	India (IND)									●		●●	●●●●●●
5	Hong Kong (HKG)									●●		●●	●
4	United States (USA)				●●				●		●		
4	Australia (AUS)											●●	●●
3	Scotland (SCO)							●				●	●
3	Norway (NOR)											●●	●
2	Belgium (BEL)			●	●								
2	Barbados (BAR)									●			●
2	Mexico (MEX)											●	●
1	Japan (JPN)					●							
1	Canada (CAN)							●					
1	Brazil (BRA)												●
1	Czech Republic (CZE)												●
1	Italy (ITA)												●
1	Macau (MAC)												●
1	Nigeria (NGR)												●
1	South Africa (RSA)												●
1	Singapore (SGP)												●

== Retirements ==
Following is a list of notable players (winners of a main tour title, and/or part of the PSA Men's World Rankings and Women's World Rankings top 30 for at least one month) who announced their retirement from professional squash, became inactive, or were permanently banned from playing, during the 2023–24 season:

- Olivia Clyne
- Low Wee Wern
- Saurav Ghosal
- Todd Harrity
- Nour El Tayeb

== Current world top 10 players ==
=== Men's world ranking ===
PSA Men's World Rankings as of 1 September 2025
Rank	Player	Points	Move^{†}
1	Mostafa Asal (EGY)	2,338	Steady
2	Diego Elías (PER)	1,631	Steady
3	Paul Coll (NZL)	1,153	Steady
4	Joel Makin (WAL)	1,096	Steady
5	Marwan Elshorbagy (ENG)	847	Steady
6	Karim Gawad (EGY)	811	Steady
7	Mohamed Elshorbagy (ENG)	794	Steady
8	Youssef Soliman (EGY)	616	Steady
9	Aly Abou Eleinen (EGY)	580	Steady
10	Youssef Ibrahim (EGY)	578	Steady

=== Women's world ranking ===
PSA Women's World Rankings, of the 5 January 2026
Rank	Player	Average	Move^{†}
1	Hania El Hammamy (EGY)	1,791	Steady
2	Nouran Gohar (EGY)	1,578	Steady
3	Amina Orfi (EGY)	1,455	Steady
4	Nour El Sherbini (EGY)	1,324	Steady
5	Olivia Weaver (USA)	1,284	Steady
6	Satomi Watanabe (JPN)	881	Steady
7	Sivasangari Subramaniam (MAS)	869	Steady
8	Tinne Gilis (BEL)	755	Steady
9	Fayrouz Aboelkheir (EGY)	753	Steady
10	Georgina Kennedy (ENG)	741	Steady

== See also ==
- 2023–24 PSA World Tour Finals
- 2024 Men's PSA World Tour Finals
- 2024 Women's PSA World Tour Finals
- 2024 in squash
