= 2022–23 PSA World Tour =

Details
- Event name: PSA World Tour 2022–23
- Dates: August 2022 – July 2023
- Categories: World Championship: Men's/Women's; World Tour Finals: Men's/Women's; PSA Challenger Tour; WSF & PSA Satellite Tour
- Website; PSA World Tour

Achievements
- World Number 1: Men: (Egypt) Ali Farag; Women: (Egypt) Nouran Gohar
- World Champion: Men: (Egypt) Ali Farag; Women: (Egypt) Nour El Sherbini

The 2022–23 PSA World Tour is the international squash tour organised circuit organized by the Professional Squash Association (PSA) for the 2022–23 squash season. It's the 8th PSA season since the merger of PSA and WSA associations in 2015.

The most important tournaments in the series are the PSA World Championship for Men's and Women's. The tour also features two circuits of regular events—PSA World Tour (formerly PSA World Series), which feature the highest prize money and the best fields; and PSA Challenger Tour with prize money ranging $5,500–$30,000. In the middle of the year (usually in June), the PSA World Tour tour is concluded by the Men's and Women's PSA World Tour Finals in Cairo, the season-ending championships for the top 8 rated players from World Tour level tournaments.

== Overview ==
=== PSA World Tour changes ===
Starting in August 2018, PSA revamped its professional tour structure in two individual circuits; PSA World Tour and PSA Challenger Tour.

PSA World Tour (formerly PSA World Series) will comprise most important tournaments in prize money for more experienced and higher-ranked players, including PSA World Championships and PSA World Tour Finals, labelled as following:

- PSA World Tour Platinum — 48-player draws — $165,000
- PSA World Tour Gold — 24-player draws — $97,500–$100,000
- PSA World Tour Silver — 24-player draws — $67,500–$70,000
- PSA World Tour Bronze — 24-player draws — $45,000–$47,500

PSA Challenger Tour tournaments will offer a $6,000–$30,000 prize-money, ideal circuit for less-experienced and upcoming players, that will include the following tiers:

- PSA Challenger Tour 30 — $30,000
- PSA Challenger Tour 20 — $20,000
- PSA Challenger Tour 10 — $12,000
- PSA Challenger Tour 5 — $6,000
- PSA Challenger Tour 3 — $3,000 (starting August 2020)

=== Prize money/ranking points breakdown ===
PSA World Tour events also have a separate World Tour ranking. Points for this are calculated on a cumulative basis after each World Tour event. The top eight players at the end of the calendar year are then eligible to play in the PSA World Tour Finals.

Ranking points vary according to tournament tier being awarded as follows:

PSA World Tour			Ranking Points						
Rank	Prize money US$	Ranking Points	Winner	Runner up	3/4	5/8	9/16	17/32	33/48
Platinum	$165,000	19188 points	2750	1810	1100	675	410	250	152.5
Gold	$97,500–$100,000	10660 points	1750	1150	700	430	260	160	
Silver	$67,500–$70,000	7470 points	1225	805	490	300	182.5	112.5	
Bronze	$47,500–$50,000	5330 points	875	575	350	215	130	80	
PSA World Tour Finals			Ranking Points						
Rank	Prize money US$	Winner	Runner up	3/4	Round-Robin Match Win	Undefeated bonus			
World Tour Finals	$185,000	1000	550	200	150	150			
PSA Challenger Tour			Ranking Points						
Rank	Prize money US$	Ranking Points	Winner	Runner up	3/4	5/8	9/16	17/32	33/48
Challenger Tour 30	$30,000	3194 points	525	345	210	130	78	47.5	
Challenger Tour 20	$20,000	2112 points	350	230	140	85	51	31.5	
Challenger Tour 10	$12,000	1218 points	200	130	80	50	30	18	
Challenger Tour 5	$6,000	609 points	100	65	40	25	15	9	
PSA World Championships			Ranking Points						
Rank	Prize money US$	Ranking Points	Winner	Runner up	3/4	5/8	9/16	17/32	33/64
PSA World Championships	$500,000	25045 points	3175	2090	1270	780	475	290	177.5

== Calendar ==
=== Key ===
PSA Tiers
World Championship
World Tour Platinum
World Tour Gold
World Tour Silver
World Tour Bronze
Challenger Tour 3/5/10/20/30

=== August ===
Tournament	Date	Champion	Runner-Up	Semifinalists	Quarterfinalists
Ostrava Squash Open; Ostrava, Czech Republic; Men : Challenger 5; 24 players – $6,000	3–7 August	(Czech Republic) Marek Panáček; 10–12, 11–5, 11–1, 11–7 (1st PSA title)	(England) James Peach	(Brazil) Diego Gobbi (Czech Republic) Ondřej Vorlíček	(Czech Republic) Jakub Solnický (Czech Republic) Viktor Byrtus (England) Noah Meredith (Spain) Marc López
Bremer Schlüssel; Bremen, Germany; Men : Challenger 10; 24 players – $12,000	8–12 August	(Egypt) Aly Abou Eleinen; 11–7, 11–6, 12–10 (1st PSA title)	(Czech Republic) Viktor Byrtus	(Egypt) Mazen Gamal (Germany) Yannik Omlor	(Colombia) Andrés Herrera (Hungary) Balázs Farkas (England) Stuart MacGregor (England) James Peach
JK Windsor Satellite; Windsor, Canada; Men : WSF & PSA Satellite; 24 players – $3,000 −−−−−− Women : WSF & PSA Satellite; 24 players – $3,000	15–17 August	(Canada) George Crowne; 11–8, 11–7, 11–6	(Canada) Salah Eltorgman	(Canada) Liam Marrison (Canada) Elliott Hunt	(Canada) David Mill (Canada) Mitchell Kahnert (Canada) Amin Khan (Canada) Maaz Mufti
JK Windsor Satellite; Windsor, Canada; Men : WSF & PSA Satellite; 24 players – $3,000 −−−−−− Women : WSF & PSA Satellite; 24 players – $3,000	15–17 August	(Colombia) Laura Tovar; 9–11, 11–5, 11–7, 11–7	(Canada) Niki Shemirani	(Canada) Molly Chadwick (Canada) Brooke Herring	(Canada) Amal Izhar (United States) Arisha Khan (Mexico) Aileen Domínguez (Canada) Erica McGillicuddy
Costa North Coast Open; Coffs Harbour, Australia; Men : Challenger 10; 24 players – $12,000 −−−−−− Women : Challenger 10; 16 players – $12,000	17–21 August	(Australia) Rex Hedrick; 9–11, 11–6, 6–11, 11–2, 11–5 (20th PSA title)	(Malaysia) Addeen Idrakie	(Switzerland) Yannick Wilhelmi (India) Abhay Singh	(New Zealand) Lwamba Chileshe (Hong Kong) Henry Leung (Hong Kong) Matthew Lai (Hong Kong) Tang Ming Hong
Costa North Coast Open; Coffs Harbour, Australia; Men : Challenger 10; 24 players – $12,000 −−−−−− Women : Challenger 10; 16 players – $12,000	17–21 August	(Hong Kong) Chan Sin Yuk; 11–7, 11–6, 11–9 (5th PSA title)	(Australia) Jessica Turnbull	(Australia) Sarah Cardwell (Hong Kong) Cheng Nga Ching	(Australia) Alex Haydon (England) Grace Gear (Singapore) Wai Yhann Au Yeong (Switzerland) Céline Walser
Torneo Profesional Mexicano de Squash; Mexico City, Mexico; Men : Challenger 5; 16 players – $6,000	18–21 August	(Mexico) Alfredo Ávila; 11–5, 2–0^{rtd.} (16th PSA title)	(Mexico) Arturo Salazar	(Brazil) Guilherme Melo (Guatemala) Alejandro Enríquez	(Argentina) Jeremías Azaña (Mexico) Edgar Zayas (Guatemala) Ricardo Toscano (Mexico) Alejandro Reyes
JK Windsor Open; Windsor, Canada; Men : Invitational; 16 players – n/a −−−−−− Women : Challenger 5; 16 players – $6,000	18–21 August	(Peru) Diego Elías; 3–11, 11–7, 11–9, 11–8	(France) Grégoire Marche	(United States) Shahjahan Khan (Egypt) Marwan El Shorbagy	(Canada) Nick Sachvie (Canada) Michael McCue (Canada) George Crowne (Canada) Salah Eltorgman
JK Windsor Open; Windsor, Canada; Men : Invitational; 16 players – n/a −−−−−− Women : Challenger 5; 16 players – $6,000	18–21 August	(Mexico) Diana García; 13–11, 11–7, 11–8 (2nd PSA title)	(Canada) Nikki Todd	(Ecuador) María Paula Moya (Japan) Erisa Sano	(Colombia) Laura Tovar (Canada) Amal Izhar (Mexico) Diana Gasca (Canada) Sara Khan
Tournoi National Féminin Les Ombrelles; Antibes, France; Women : WSF & PSA Satellite; 32 players – $2,200	20–21 August	(France) Élise Romba; 6–11, 11–6, 11–7, 11–7	(France) Kara Lincou	(Argentina) Pilar Etchechoury (France) Léa Barbeau	(France) Ninon Lemarchand (Egypt) Fareda Rakaybi (Spain) Ona Blasco (France) Maud Duplomb
CIB ZED Squash Open; Sheikh Zayed City, Egypt; Men : World Tour Bronze; 24 players – $55,000 −−−−−− Women : World Tour Bronze; 24 players – $55,000	24–28 August	(Egypt) Youssef Soliman; 11–8, 11–5, 11–6 (9th PSA title)	(France) Victor Crouin	(Egypt) Omar Mosaad (Germany) Raphael Kandra	(Hungary) Balázs Farkas (Egypt) Yahya Elnawasany (Egypt) Mohamed ElSherbini (Egypt) Moustafa El Sirty
CIB ZED Squash Open; Sheikh Zayed City, Egypt; Men : World Tour Bronze; 24 players – $55,000 −−−−−− Women : World Tour Bronze; 24 players – $55,000	24–28 August	(Egypt) Nour El Tayeb; 11–7, 12–14, 11–6, 11–4 (12th PSA title)	(Egypt) Salma Hany	(Egypt) Farida Mohamed (Belgium) Nele Gilis	(Egypt) Nadine Shahin (Egypt) Hana Ramadan (France) Mélissa Alves (United States) Marina Stefanoni
PSF-COMBAXX International Tournament; Islamabad, Pakistan; Men : Challenger 10; 24 players – $12,000	24–28 August	(Pakistan) Nasir Iqbal; 11–7, 11–7, 11–6 (13th PSA title)	(Pakistan) Noor Zaman	(Egypt) Abdalah El Masry (Pakistan) Ashab Irfan	(Malaysia) Hafiz Zhafri (Pakistan) Hamza Khan (Pakistan) Farhan Zaman (Pakistan) Ahsan Ayaz
PSA des Hauts-de-France; Lille, France; Men : Challenger 5; 24 players – $6,000 −−−−−− Women : Challenger 5; 24 players – $6,000	24–28 August	(France) Edwin Clain; 11–9, 13–11, 9–11, 11–6 (1st PSA title)	(Colombia) Andrés Herrera	(France) Toufik Mekhalfi (England) Perry Malik	(Czech Republic) Jakub Solnický (Austria) Aqeel Rehman (Wales) Elliott Morris Devred (Japan) Ryosei Kobayashi
PSA des Hauts-de-France; Lille, France; Men : Challenger 5; 24 players – $6,000 −−−−−− Women : Challenger 5; 24 players – $6,000	24–28 August	(Egypt) Nardine Garas; 11–7, 11–9, 11–6 (1st PSA title)	(England) Alicia Mead	(England) Torrie Malik (Switzerland) Ambre Allinckx	(Malaysia) Yasshmita Jadishkumar (Ukraine) Alina Bushma (France) Léa Barbeau (France) Taba Taghavi
Alto Group Pennant Hills NSW Squash Open; Thornleigh, Australia; Men : Challenger 3; 16 players – $3,000 −−−−−− Women : Challenger 3; 16 players – $3,000	25–28 August	(India) Abhay Singh; 15–13, 11–9, 1–11, 11–8 (3rd PSA title)	(Switzerland) Robin Gadola	(Switzerland) Yannick Wilhelmi (Australia) Rhys Dowling	(Philippines) Robert Garcia (Hong Kong) Harley Lam (Hong Kong) Matthew Lai (Hong Kong) Chung Yat Long
Alto Group Pennant Hills NSW Squash Open; Thornleigh, Australia; Men : Challenger 3; 16 players – $3,000 −−−−−− Women : Challenger 3; 16 players – $3,000	25–28 August	(Malaysia) Yee Xin Ying; 11–7, 14–16, 9–11, 11–6, 11–3 (1st PSA title)	(Hong Kong) Cheng Nga Ching	(Switzerland) Céline Walser (Malaysia) Aira Azman	(Hong Kong) Heylie Fung (Malaysia) Sehveetrraa Kumar (Japan) Akari Midorikawa (India) Urwashi Joshi
Volkswagen Bega Open; Bega, Australia; Men : Challenger 10; 24 players – $12,000 −−−−−− Women : Challenger 10; 24 players – $12,000	31 Aug. – 4 Sep.	(Hong Kong) Alex Lau; 11–8, 11–5, 11–8 (5th PSA title)	(Australia) Rex Hedrick	(Japan) Ryūnosuke Tsukue (Malaysia) Mohd Syafiq Kamal	(Malaysia) Darren Rahul Pragasam (Malaysia) Addeen Idrakie (Pakistan) Asim Khan (Hong Kong) Wong Chi Him
Volkswagen Bega Open; Bega, Australia; Men : Challenger 10; 24 players – $12,000 −−−−−− Women : Challenger 10; 24 players – $12,000	31 Aug. – 4 Sep.	(Hong Kong) Chan Sin Yuk; 11–7, 11–6, 11–3 (6th PSA title)	(Malaysia) Yee Xin Ying	(Malaysia) Ainaa Amani (Malaysia) Chan Yiwen	(Australia) Jessica Turnbull (England) Grace Gear (Hong Kong) Heylie Fung (Hong Kong) Cheng Nga Ching

=== September ===
Tournament	Date	Champion	Runner-Up	Semifinalists	Quarterfinalists
QTerminals Qatar Classic; Doha, Qatar; Men : World Tour Platinum; 48 players – $187,500	4–10 September	(England) Mohamed El Shorbagy; 11–4, 11–6, 7–11, 11–8 (45th PSA title)	(France) Victor Crouin	(Egypt) Tarek Momen (Egypt) Mostafa Asal	(Peru) Diego Elías (Egypt) Marwan El Shorbagy (Qatar) Abdulla Al-Tamimi (Colombia) Miguel Á Rodríguez
Sam Aguiar Louisville Open; Louisville, United States; Men : Challenger 10; 24 players – $12,000	6–10 September	(United States) Timothy Brownell; 11–4, 11–8, 7–11, 11–6 (2nd PSA title)	(Mexico) Alfredo Ávila	(Egypt) Aly Hussein (Egypt) Seif Shenawy	(United States) Andrew Douglas (Brazil) Diego Gobbi (Pakistan) Ashab Irfan (Czech Republic) Daniel Mekbib
South Western Women's Open; Houston, United States; Women : World Tour Gold; 24 players – $110,000	6–11 September	(Egypt) Nouran Gohar; 12–10, 11–5, 11–7 (18th PSA title)	(Egypt) Nour El Tayeb	(United States) Amanda Sobhy (Egypt) Rowan Elaraby	(Egypt) Salma Hany (United States) Olivia Fiechter (Wales) Emily Whitlock (England) Georgina Kennedy
Tasmanian Open; Devonport, Australia; Men : Challenger 10; 24 players - $12,000 −−−−−− Women : Challenger 10; 24 players – $12,000	7–11 September	(Hong Kong) Alex Lau; 11–4, 11–8, 11–2 (6th PSA title)	(Malaysia) Addeen Idrakie	(Switzerland) Robin Gadola (Japan) Ryūnosuke Tsukue	(Switzerland) Yannick Wilhelmi (New Zealand) Temwa Chileshe (Hong Kong) Wong Chi Him (New Zealand) Lwamba Chileshe
Tasmanian Open; Devonport, Australia; Men : Challenger 10; 24 players - $12,000 −−−−−− Women : Challenger 10; 24 players – $12,000	7–11 September	(Hong Kong) Tong Tsz Wing; 11–3, 11–3, 11–8 (9th PSA title)	(Malaysia) Chan Yiwen	(Australia) Jessica Turnbull (Australia) Alex Haydon	(Malaysia) Ainaa Amani (Malaysia) Aira Azman (Malaysia) Yasshmita Jadishkumar (Malaysia) Yee Xin Ying
Madeira International; Caniço, Portugal; Men : Challenger 10; 24 players – $12,000 −−−−−− Women : Challenger 3; 16 players – $3,000	7–11 September	(Hungary) Balázs Farkas; 11–7, 9–11, 11–7, 11–9 (10th PSA title)	(Portugal) Rui Soares	(Egypt) Aly Abou Eleinen (Spain) Iván Pérez	(England) Simon Herbert (England) Ben Coleman (Colombia) Ronald Palomino (Wales) Emyr Evans
Madeira International; Caniço, Portugal; Men : Challenger 10; 24 players – $12,000 −−−−−− Women : Challenger 3; 16 players – $3,000	7–11 September	(Germany) Katerina Týcová; 11–7, 11–5, 6–11, 11–8 (1st PSA title)	(England) Kiera Marshall	(Ukraine) Anastasia Kostyukova (France) Léa Barbeau	(Colombia) María Tovar (Scotland) Katriona Allen (France) Ella Gálová (Portugal) Sofia Aveiro
Open de France; Nantes, France; Men : World Tour Bronze; 24 players - $55,000 −−−−−− Women : World Tour Bronze; 24 players - $55,000	12–17 September	(France) Victor Crouin; 11–6, 9–11, 6–11, 11–8, 12–10 (17th PSA title)	(Egypt) Marwan El Shorbagy	(India) Saurav Ghosal (France) Auguste Dussourd	(Spain) Iker Pajares (England) Declan James (England) George Parker (Mexico) Leonel Cárdenas
Open de France; Nantes, France; Men : World Tour Bronze; 24 players - $55,000 −−−−−− Women : World Tour Bronze; 24 players - $55,000	12–17 September	(Belgium) Nele Gilis; 11–9, 11–6, 11–3 (8th PSA title)	(Belgium) Tinne Gilis	(Wales) Tesni Evans (Egypt) Fayrouz Aboelkheir	(Egypt) Nour Aboulmakarim (Egypt) Nardine Garas (Canada) Nicole Bunyan (Egypt) Salma El Tayeb
NASH Cup; London, Canada; Men : Challenger 20; 24 players – $20,000 −−−−−− Women : Challenger 20; 24 players – $20,000	13–17 September	(England) Nathan Lake; 11–6, 10–12, 11–2, 11–7 (8th PSA title)	(England) Curtis Malik	(Hong Kong) Henry Leung (Spain) Edmon López	(Argentina) Leandro Romiglio (United States) Andrew Douglas (Czech Republic) Daniel Mekbib (United States) Christopher Gordon
NASH Cup; London, Canada; Men : Challenger 20; 24 players – $20,000 −−−−−− Women : Challenger 20; 24 players – $20,000	13–17 September	(Egypt) Zeina Zein; 11–4, 9–11, 11–9, 11–6 (2nd PSA title)	(Scotland) Georgia Adderley	(England) Lucy Beecroft (United States) Haley Mendez	(United States) Marina Stefanoni (Spain) Marta Domínguez (Switzerland) Ambre Allinckx (England) Torrie Malik
Eastside Open; Bellerive, Australia; Men : Challenger 5; 32 players – $6,000 −−−−−− Women : Challenger 3; 16 players – $3,000	14–18 September	(Switzerland) Robin Gadola; 11–9, 10–12, 9–11, 11–6, 11–8 (1st PSA title)	(New Zealand) Temwa Chileshe	(New Zealand) Elijah Thomas (Malaysia) Bryan Lim Tze Kang	(Philippines) Robert Garcia (Hong Kong) Matthew Lai (Australia) Nicholas Calvert (New Zealand) Anthony Lepper
Eastside Open; Bellerive, Australia; Men : Challenger 5; 32 players – $6,000 −−−−−− Women : Challenger 3; 16 players – $3,000	14–18 September	(Hong Kong) Heylie Fung; 11–9, 7–11, 6–11, 11–4, 8–11 (1st PSA title)	(Hong Kong) Cheng Nga Ching	(Australia) Maggy Marshall (Pakistan) Riffat Khan	(Pakistan) Aiman Shahbaz (Malta) Colette Sultana (Pakistan) Noor-ul-Huda (Australia) Jennifer Condie
Copa México Temazcal; Lomas de Cocoyoc, Mexico; Men : Challenger 3; 16 players – $3,000	15–18 September	(Mexico) Alejandro Reyes; 11–13, 8–11, 11–9, 11–8, 11–7 (1st PSA title)	(Mexico) Jorge Gómez	(Egypt) Abdelrahman Nassar (Colombia) Nicolás Serna	(Mexico) Miled Zarazúa (Guatemala) Luis Quisquinay (Mexico) Sebastián Salazar (Czech Republic) Petr Nohel
4th HCL SRFI Indian Tour – Chennai; Chennai, India; Men : Challenger 10; 24 players – $12,000 −−−−−− Women : Challenger 10; 24 players – $12,000	19–23 September	(India) Abhay Singh; 11–4, 11–3, 11–4 (4th PSA title)	(Egypt) Khaled Labib	(Egypt) Yassin ElShafei (Czech Republic) Martin Švec	(Egypt) Mohamed Nasser (India) Velavan Senthilkumar (India) Rahul Baitha (Japan) Tomotaka Endo
4th HCL SRFI Indian Tour – Chennai; Chennai, India; Men : Challenger 10; 24 players – $12,000 −−−−−− Women : Challenger 10; 24 players – $12,000	19–23 September	(Egypt) Kenzy Ayman; 11–7, 11–2, 11–6 (2nd PSA title)	(India) Sunayna Kuruvilla	(India) Tanvi Khanna (Egypt) Salma El Tayeb	(Egypt) Menna Walid (Egypt) Haya Ali (India) Urwashi Joshi (Egypt) Amina El Rihany
St. Louis Open; St. Louis, United States; Men : Challenger 10; 24 players – $12,000	20–24 September	(Scotland) Rory Stewart; 11–6, 12–10, 9–11, 11–9 (7th PSA title)	(England) Curtis Malik	(England) Charlie Lee (Egypt) Aly Hussein	(Czech Republic) Daniel Mekbib (United States) Christopher Gordon (Pakistan) Nasir Iqbal (Brazil) Diego Gobbi
CIB Egyptian Open; Cairo, Egypt; Men : World Tour Platinum; 48 players – $300,000 −−−−−− Women : World Tour Platinum; 48 players – $300,000	19–25 September	(Egypt) Ali Farag; 11–6, 8–11, 11–4, 11–7 (29th PSA title)	(New Zealand) Paul Coll	(Peru) Diego Elías (Egypt) Mostafa Asal	(Egypt) Fares Dessouky (Egypt) Marwan El Shorbagy (Egypt) Tarek Momen (Egypt) Mazen Hesham
CIB Egyptian Open; Cairo, Egypt; Men : World Tour Platinum; 48 players – $300,000 −−−−−− Women : World Tour Platinum; 48 players – $300,000	19–25 September	(Egypt) Hania El Hammamy; 11–7, 11–13, 11–3, 11–4 (10th PSA title)	(Egypt) Nouran Gohar	(United States) Amanda Sobhy (Egypt) Nour El Sherbini	(United States) Olivia Fiechter (Wales) Tesni Evans (England) Sarah-Jane Perry (Canada) Hollie Naughton
Open National de squash Energeia Toulouse; Saint-Orens-de-Gameville, France; Men : WSF & PSA Satellite; 32 players – $2,500	23–25 September	(France) Benjamin Aubert; 12–10, 11–5, 11–7	(Argentina) Robertino Pezzota	(France) Edwin Clain (France) Brice Nicolas	(France) Baptiste Bouin (France) Antonin Romieu (France) Joshua Phinéra (France) Paul Gonzalez
GWC Squash House Challenger; Cos Cob, United States; Women : Challenger 5; 16 players – $6,000	23–26 September	(United States) Marina Stefanoni; 11–7, 11–3, 11–5 (6th PSA title)	(Colombia) Laura Tovar	(India) Akanksha Salunkhe (England) Torrie Malik	(France) Julia Le Coq (Egypt) Zeina Zein (United States) Lucie Stefanoni (Canada) Hannah Blatt
1st Kuwait International Championship; Ministries Zone, Kuwait; Men : Challenger 10; 24 players – $12,000	24–28 September	(France) Auguste Dussourd; 8–11, 11–6, 11–9, 11–4 (12th PSA title)	(Kuwait) Abdullah Al-Muzayen	(Hungary) Balázs Farkas (Egypt) Khaled Labib	(England) Tom Walsh (Egypt) Mazen Gamal (Kuwait) Ammar Al-Tamimi (Egypt) Abdalah El Masry
L'International des Mirabelles; Maxéville, France; Men : Challenger 3; 16 players – $3,000 −−−−−− Women : Challenger 3; 16 players – $3,000	29 Sept. – 2 Oct.	(France) Edwin Clain; 11–8, 8–11, 12–10, 10–12, 11–5 (2nd PSA title)	(England) Robert Downer	(Germany) Yannik Omlor (England) Noah Meredith	(Wales) Elliott Morris Devred (Germany) Valentin Rapp (Switzerland) Nils Rösch (England) Aaron Allpress
L'International des Mirabelles; Maxéville, France; Men : Challenger 3; 16 players – $3,000 −−−−−− Women : Challenger 3; 16 players – $3,000	29 Sept. – 2 Oct.	(England) Asia Harris; 11–3, 7–11, 13–11, 12–10 (1st PSA title)	(England) Kiera Marshall	(England) Katie Wells (Spain) Sofía Mateos	(France) Élise Romba (Denmark) Caroline Lyng (France) Ninon Lemarchand (Denmark) Klara Møller
Cleveland Skating Club Open; Shaker Heights, United States; Men : Challenger 30; 24 players – $30,000	29 Sept. – 3 Oct.	(Malaysia) Eain Yow; 11-9, 6–11, 11–9, 11–3 (5th PSA title)	(France) Sébastien Bonmalais	(Scotland) Rory Stewart (Mexico) Leonel Cárdenas	(United States) Andrew Douglas (Hong Kong) Alex Lau (England) Charlie Lee (United States) Timothy Brownell
Oracle Netsuite Open; San Francisco, United States; Men : World Tour Silver; 24 players – $80,000 −−−−−− Women : World Tour Silver; 24 players – $80,000	30 Sept. – 4 Oct.	(England) Mohamed El Shorbagy; 6–11, 11–9, 11–2, 11–8 (46th PSA title)	(Egypt) Mar El Shorbagy	(Peru) Diego Elías (Egypt) Mazen Hesham	(United States) Shahjahan Khan (Colombia) Miguel Á Rodríguez (India) Saurav Ghosal (Egypt) Aly Abou Eleinen
Oracle Netsuite Open; San Francisco, United States; Men : World Tour Silver; 24 players – $80,000 −−−−−− Women : World Tour Silver; 24 players – $80,000	30 Sept. – 4 Oct.	(United States) Amanda Sobhy; 9–11, 11–5, 11–3, 11–7 (19th PSA title)	(Egypt) Farida Mohamed	(New Zealand) Joelle King (Canada) Hollie Naughton	(Hong Kong) Chan Sin Yuk (Egypt) Hana Ramadan (United States) Sabrina Sobhy (Scotland) Lisa Aitken

=== October ===
Tournament	Date	Champion	Runner-Up	Semifinalists	Quarterfinalists
PSA Saarland Squash Open; Illingen, Germany; Men : WSF & PSA Satellite; 16 players – $2,000	1–2 October	(Germany) Rudi Rohrmüller; 11–7, 11–4, 14–12	(Germany) Jan Wipperfürth	(Egypt) Tarek Shehata (Republic of Ireland) Scott Gillanders	(England) Syed Hasnain (Romania) Bogdan Vasile (Switzerland) Miguel Mathis (Spain) Álvaro Martín
2nd Bangabandhu Squash Tournament; Dhaka, Bangladesh; Men : Challenger 5; 32 players – $6,000	5–9 October	(Sri Lanka) Ravindu Laksiri; 11–8, 11–6, 5–11, 11–9 (1st PSA title)	(Egypt) Ziad Ibrahim	(Kuwait) Ammar Al-Tamimi (Malaysia) Amir Amirul	(Malaysia) Duncan Lee (Iran) Sami Ghasedabadi (Egypt) Abdelrahman Abdelkhalek (Egypt) Abdelaziz Hegazy
U.S. Open; Philadelphia, United States; Men : World Tour Platinum; 48 players – $181,377 −−−−−− Women : World Tour Platinum; 48 players – $181,377	8–15 October	(Peru) Diego Elías; 2–0^{rtd.} (12th PSA title)	(Egypt) Ali Farag	(Egypt) Marwan El Shorbagy (England) Mohamed El Shorbagy	(New Zealand) Paul Coll (Egypt) Tarek Momen (Egypt) Youssef Soliman (Wales) Joel Makin
U.S. Open; Philadelphia, United States; Men : World Tour Platinum; 48 players – $181,377 −−−−−− Women : World Tour Platinum; 48 players – $181,377	8–15 October	(Egypt) Nouran Gohar; 11–7, 9–11, 11–7, 11–6 (19th PSA title)	(Egypt) Nour El Sherbini	(Egypt) Nour El Tayeb (New Zealand) Joelle King	(Egypt) Rowan Elaraby (United States) Sabrina Sobhy (United States) Amanda Sobhy (Egypt) Salma Hany
White Oaks Court Classic; Niagara-on-the-Lake, Canada; Men : Challenger 5; 24 players – $6,000	11–15 October	(Canada) Nick Sachvie; 11–9, 11–9, 11–5 (6th PSA title)	(Canada) George Crowne	(Canada) Salah Eltorgman (Netherlands) Rowan Damming	(Canada) Liam Marrison (Canada) Michael McCue (Mexico) Miled Zarazúa (Canada) Cory McCartney
Concourse Athletic Club Open; Atlanta, United States; Men : Challenger 10; 24 players – $12,000	12–16 October	(England) Sam Todd; 11–6, 11–7, 11–8 (4th PSA title)	(Egypt) Aly Hussein	(United States) Faraz Khan (Pakistan) Asim Khan	(Guatemala) Alejandro Enríquez (England) Finnlay Withington (Finland) Henrik Mustonen (Guatemala) Josué Enríquez
Burnt Squash Open; Lakeville, United States; Men : Challenger 5; 16 players – $6,000	14–17 October	(Egypt) Seif Shenawy; 11–6, 11–5, 11–5 (1st PSA title)	(United States) Spencer Lovejoy	(Malaysia) Sanjay Jeeva (Nigeria) Babatunde Ajagbe	(Pakistan) Farhan Hashmi (Egypt) Abdelrahman Nassar (Pakistan) Hamza Sharif (India) Abhishek Agarwal
Jansher Khan Canberra Open; Canberra, Australia; Men : Challenger 20; 24 players – $20,000	18–22 October	(England) Adrian Waller; 12–10, 11–8, 11–5 (10th PSA title)	(Japan) Ryūnosuke Tsukue	(Canada) David Baillargeon (United States) Andrew Douglas	(Czech Republic) Martin Švec (Malaysia) Mohd Syafiq Kamal (England) Charlie Lee (Wales) Owain Taylor
Grasshopper Cup; Zürich, Switzerland; Men : World Tour Gold; 24 players – $107,500 −−−−−− Women : World Tour Gold; 24 players – $107,500	18–23 October	(Egypt) Mostafa Asal; 13–11, 11–2, 11–5 (9th PSA title)	(Egypt) Marwan ElShorbagy	(Egypt) Fares Dessouky (Peru) Diego Elías	(New Zealand) Paul Coll (Wales) Joel Makin (Switzerland) Nicolas Müller (Egypt) Tarek Momen
Grasshopper Cup; Zürich, Switzerland; Men : World Tour Gold; 24 players – $107,500 −−−−−− Women : World Tour Gold; 24 players – $107,500	18–23 October	(Egypt) Nour El Sherbini; 9–11, 11–9, 10–12, 11–3, 11–4 (31st PSA title)	(Egypt) Hania El Hammamy	(Egypt) Rowan Elaraby (Wales) Tesni Evans	(Egypt) Salma Hany (Egypt) Nour El Tayeb (United States) Olivia Fiechter (England) Georgina Kennedy
CAS Serena Hotels/Combaxx International; Islamabad, Pakistan; Men : Challenger 30; 24 players – $30,000 −−−−−− Women : Challenger 10; 24 players – $12,000	19–23 October	(Egypt) Moustafa El Sirty; 4–11, 11–5, 11–8, 11–7 (13th PSA title)	(Egypt) Mohamed ElSherbini	(Hungary) Balázs Farkas (Egypt) Yahya Elnawasany	(Pakistan) Farhan Zaman (England) Curtis Malik (Egypt) Ibrahim Elkabbani (Egypt) Yassin ElShafei
CAS Serena Hotels/Combaxx International; Islamabad, Pakistan; Men : Challenger 30; 24 players – $30,000 −−−−−− Women : Challenger 10; 24 players – $12,000	19–23 October	(Egypt) Fayrouz Aboelkheir; 11–6, 10–12, 11–4, 6–11, 12–10 (3rd PSA title)	(Egypt) Malak Khafagy	(Egypt) Nour Heikal (Spain) Marta Domínguez	(Austria) Jacqueline Peychär (Egypt) Haya Ali (Singapore) Wai Yhann Au Yeong (Germany) Katerina Týcová
Life Time Chicago Open; Vernon Hills, United States; Men : Challenger 30; 24 players - $30,000 −−−−−− Women : Challenger 10; 24 players – $12,000	19–23 October	(France) Victor Crouin; 7–11, 11–6, 11–6, 11–0 (18th PSA title)	(India) Ramit Tandon	(Mexico) César Salazar (England) Sam Todd	(Egypt) Zahed Salem (England) Nathan Lake (United States) Faraz Khan (United States) Todd Harrity
Life Time Chicago Open; Vernon Hills, United States; Men : Challenger 30; 24 players - $30,000 −−−−−− Women : Challenger 10; 24 players – $12,000	19–23 October	(Egypt) Hana Moataz; 11–7, 11–6, 9–11, 11–9 (4th PSA title)	(Egypt) Kenzy Ayman	(Scotland) Georgia Adderley (England) Alicia Mead	(Japan) Erisa Sano (Egypt) Sohaila Ismail (England) Anna Kimberley (India) Akanksha Salunkhe
PayByFace Randburg Open; Randburg, South Africa; Men : Challenger 5; 24 players - $6,000 −−−−−− Women : Challenger 5; 24 players – $6,000	19–23 October	(South Africa) Dewald van Niekerk; 11–7, 5–11, 11–4, 11–8 (4th PSA title)	(France) Toufik Mekhalfi	(South Africa) Jean-Pierre Brits (France) Edwin Clain	(France) Laszlo Godde (Egypt) Yusuf Elsherif (South Africa) Tristen Worth (Sri Lanka) Shamil Wakeel
PayByFace Randburg Open; Randburg, South Africa; Men : Challenger 5; 24 players - $6,000 −−−−−− Women : Challenger 5; 24 players – $6,000	19–23 October	(South Africa) Cheyna Wood; 11–8, 11–7, 15–13 (2nd PSA title)	(France) Élise Romba	(Egypt) Nour Khafagy (Ukraine) Anastasia Kostyukova	(Egypt) Shahd Elrefaey (France) Lilou Brévard-Belliot (South Africa) Helena Coetzee (South Africa) Alexa Pienaar
La Classique de Gatineau; Gatineau, Canada; Men : WSF & PSA Satellite; 16 players – $2,250	21–23 October	(Canada) Liam Marrison; 11–4, 11–7, 11–2	(Canada) Maximilien Godbout	(Canada) Ryan Picken (Egypt) Asser Ibrahim	(Bermuda) Taylor Carrick (Pakistan) Abbas Nawaz (Canada) Mitchell Kahnert (Canada) Charles de la Riva
The Hamilton Open; Lancaster, United States; Women : Challenger 20; 24 players – $20,000	25–29 October	(Egypt) Hana Moataz; 9–11, 11–7, 11–8, 11–3 (5th PSA title)	(England) Lucy Beecroft	(Scotland) Lisa Aitken (Scotland) Georgia Adderley	(England) Lucy Turmel (Canada) Nicole Bunyan (India) Akanksha Salunkhe (England) Anna Kimberley
Richardson Wealth Van Lawn Open; Vancouver, Canada; Men : Challenger 10; 16 players – $12,000	26–29 October	(United States) Timothy Brownell; 12–10, 11–7, 11–5 (3rd PSA title)	(Mexico) Arturo Salazar	(Germany) Yannik Omlor (Argentina) Jeremías Azaña	(United States) Spencer Lovejoy (England) Perry Malik (Mexico) Alejandro Reyes (Canada) Liam Marrison
Australian Open; Darlington, Australia; Men : Challenger 30; 24 players – $30,000 −−−−−− Women : Challenger 30; 24 players – $30,000	26–30 October	(Colombia) Miguel Á Rodríguez; 8–11, 11–8, 11–1, 11–9 (30th PSA title)	(Scotland) Greg Lobban	(England) Adrian Waller (United States) Andrew Douglas	(England) Charlie Lee (Japan) Ryūnosuke Tsukue (Australia) Rex Hedrick (Czech Republic) Martin Švec
Australian Open; Darlington, Australia; Men : Challenger 30; 24 players – $30,000 −−−−−− Women : Challenger 30; 24 players – $30,000	26–30 October	(Belgium) Nele Gilis; 11–9, 11–8, 11–6 (9th PSA title)	(United States) Sabrina Sobhy	(Japan) Satomi Watanabe (United States) Olivia Clyne	(England) Jasmine Hutton (New Zealand) Kaitlyn Watts (Australia) Donna Lobban (Germany) Saskia Beinhard
PSA Bordeaux–Gradignan; Gradignan, France; Men : Challenger 10; 24 players - $12,000	26–30 October	(Scotland) Rory Stewart; 10–12, 11–4, 11–4, 1–0^{rtd.} (8th PSA title)	(France) Benjamin Aubert	(England) Ben Coleman (Portugal) Rui Soares	(Colombia) Juan Camilo Vargas (Czech Republic) Daniel Mekbib (Spain) Iván Pérez (England) Stuart MacGregor
Swiss Open; Uster, Switzerland; Men : Challenger 5; 32 players – $6,000 −−−−−− Women : Challenger 5; 24 players – $6,000	26–30 October	(England) Ben Smith; 6–11, 11–3, 11–13, 11–7, 11–4 (2nd PSA title)	(Czech Republic) Marek Panáček	(Switzerland) Yannick Wilhelmi (Austria) Aqeel Rehman	(Spain) Nilo Vidal (Switzerland) Robin Gadola (Italy) Yuri Farneti (Republic of Ireland) Sam Buckley
Swiss Open; Uster, Switzerland; Men : Challenger 5; 32 players – $6,000 −−−−−− Women : Challenger 5; 24 players – $6,000	26–30 October	(England) Katie Malliff; 9–11, 14–12, 11–2, 4–11, 11–7 (2nd PSA title)	(Spain) Marta Domínguez	(Switzerland) Céline Walser (Scotland) Alison Thomson	(France) Ella Gálová (Wales) Lowri Roberts (Finland) Emilia Korhonen (England) Polly Clark
Greenwich Open; Greenwich, United States; Men : Challenger 5; 24 players – $6,000 −−−−−− Women : Challenger 5; 24 players – $6,000	26–30 October	(Egypt) Marwan Tarek; 11–4, 11–7, 11–4 (3rd PSA title)	(Colombia) Andrés Herrera	(Egypt) Abdelrahman Nassar (Egypt) Karim Elbarbary	(Mexico) Carlos Vargas (India) Abhishek Agarwal (Guatemala) Ricardo Toscano (Nigeria) Babatunde Ajagbe
Greenwich Open; Greenwich, United States; Men : Challenger 5; 24 players – $6,000 −−−−−− Women : Challenger 5; 24 players – $6,000	26–30 October	(Malaysia) Wen Li Lai; 11–8, 12–10, 11–2 (3rd PSA title)	(England) Alicia Mead	(Ukraine) Alina Bushma (United States) Emma Trauber	(Spain) Noa Romero (England) Margot Prow (Egypt) Hana Ismail (France) Ninon Lemarchand
Oban PSA Satellite Event; Oban, Scotland; Men : WSF & PSA Satellite; 16 players – $2,500	28–30 October	(Scotland) Alasdair Prott; 13–15, 11–2, 11–5, 11–7	(England) Will Salter	(Scotland) Martin Ross (Scotland) John Meehan	(England) Hasnaat Farooqi (Scotland) Adam Hunter (Scotland) Fraser Steven (Singapore) Brandon Tan

=== November ===
Tournament	Date	Champion	Runner-Up	Semifinalists	Quarterfinalists
Open PSA Lagord; Lagord, France; Men : Challenger 20; 24 players – $20,000	1–5 November	(France) Auguste Dussourd; 11–7, 11–4, 11–2 (13th PSA title)	(Scotland) Rory Stewart	(England) Declan James (Egypt) Mazen Gamal	(England) Simon Herbert (Egypt) Ibrahim Elkabbani (England) James Willstrop (Japan) Ryosei Kobayashi
QPCC Premiere PSA Squash Tournament; Port of Spain, Trinidad and Tobago; Men : Challenger 5; 24 players – $6,000	1–5 November	(Netherlands) Rowan Damming; 3–11, 11–9, 14–12, 11–8 (1st PSA title)	(Colombia) Andrés Herrera	(France) Macéo Lévy (New Zealand) Elijah Thomas	(New Zealand) Anthony Lepper (Canada) Cory McCartney (Mexico) Carlos Vargas (England) Noah Meredith
Sport Central Open; Richmond, Canada; Men : Challenger 5; 16 players – $6,000	3–6 November	(Mexico) Alfredo Ávila; 11–7, 11–7, 11–5 (17th PSA title)	(England) Perry Malik	(Mexico) Alejandro Reyes (Argentina) Jeremías Azaña	(Canada) Connor Turk (Mexico) Edgar Zayas (Canada) Liam Marrison (United States) Jamie Ruggiero
Carrus Nations Cup; Mount Maunganui, New Zealand; Mixed teams : Invitational; 8 teams/2 players each/1 male & 1 female	3–6 November	Final: England 1–1^{(45–44p)} New Zealand ------------- M El Shorbagy //7–5, 7–6, 7–1, 7–4// P Coll; J King //7–4, 7–2, 7–5, 7–6// S-J Perry		3rd place: Europe 2–0 Canada ------------- (Belgium) N Gilis //6–7, 1–7, 7–6, 7–5, 7–2, 7–1// H Naughton (France) S Bonmalais //7–1, 7–1, 7–2, 7–5// D Baillargeon	
Czech Open; Brno, Czech Republic; Men : Challenger 30; 24 players – $30,000 −−−−−− Women : Challenger 3; 16 players – $3,000	3–7 November	(Switzerland) Nicolas Müller; 10–12, 11–5, 11–6, 11–8 (12th PSA title)	(Switzerland) Dimitri Steinmann	(Germany) Raphael Kandra (Portugal) Rui Soares	(Mexico) César Salazar (England) George Parker (England) Nathan Lake (England) Curtis Malik
Czech Open; Brno, Czech Republic; Men : Challenger 30; 24 players – $30,000 −−−−−− Women : Challenger 3; 16 players – $3,000	3–7 November	(England) Torrie Malik; 11–6, 11–5, 18–16 (1st PSA title)	(Netherlands) Tessa ter Sluis	(Scotland) Alison Thomson (Netherlands) Juliette Permentier	(Ukraine) Anastasia Kostiukova (Scotland) Ellie Jones (Czech Republic) Tamara Holzbauerová (Spain) Ona Blasco
Open International Niort-Venise Verte; Bessines, France; Men : Challenger 20; 24 players – $20,000	7–11 November	(Spain) Borja Golán; 11–6, 6–11, 11–8, 11–9 (33rd PSA title)	(France) Baptiste Masotti	(Portugal) Rui Soares (Egypt) Ibrahim Elkabbani	(France) Auguste Dussourd (England) Simon Herbert (England) Ben Smith (Scotland) Rory Stewart
SACC Costa Rica Open; Pozos, Costa Rica; Men : Challenger 5; 16 players – $6,000 −−−−−− Women : Challenger 5; 16 players – $6,000	9–12 November	(Guatemala) Josué Enríquez; 11–13, 11–8, 11–4, 11–2 (3rd PSA title)	(Argentina) Jeremias Azaña	(Paraguay) Francesco Marcantonio (Mexico) Leo Vargas	(Mexico) Allan Núñez (New Zealand) Elijah Thomas (New Zealand) Willz Donnelly (Guatemala) Luis Quisquinay
SACC Costa Rica Open; Pozos, Costa Rica; Men : Challenger 5; 16 players – $6,000 −−−−−− Women : Challenger 5; 16 players – $6,000	9–12 November	(Colombia) Laura Tovar; 11–7, 4–11, 11–8, 11–9 (2nd PSA title)	(Colombia) Lucía Bautista	(Mexico) Sarahí López (Mexico) Diana Gasca	(Mexico) Diana García (Colombia) María Tovar (Guatemala) Mary Mijas (Guatemala) Darlyn Sandoval
Robertson Lodges/Barfoot & Thompson NZL Open; Mount Maunganui, New Zealand; Men : World Tour Silver; 24 players – $77,500 −−−−−− Women : World Tour Silver; 24 players – $77,500	8–13 November	(England) Mohamed El Shorbagy; 9–11, 11–8, 11–4, 11–7 (47th PSA title)	(New Zealand) Paul Coll	(France) Victor Crouin (Qatar) Abdulla Al-Tamimi	(England) Adrian Waller (United States) Andrew Douglas (Argentina) Leandro Romiglio (Canada) David Baillargeon
Robertson Lodges/Barfoot & Thompson NZL Open; Mount Maunganui, New Zealand; Men : World Tour Silver; 24 players – $77,500 −−−−−− Women : World Tour Silver; 24 players – $77,500	8–13 November	(New Zealand) Joelle King; 11–4, 11–6, 11–5 (15th PSA title)	(Wales) Tesni Evans	(Belgium) Nele Gilis (Belgium) Tinne Gilis	(England) Sarah-Jane Perry (Japan) Satomi Watanabe (Canada) Hollie Naughton (United States) Sabrina Sobhy
Rhode Island Open; Providence, United States; Women : Challenger 20; 24 players – $20,000	9–13 November	(Egypt) Farida Mohamed; 11–6, 11–9, 20–18 (6th PSA title)	(United States) Marina Stefanoni	(England) Lucy Beecroft (India) Akanksha Salunkhe	(England) Lucy Turmel (England) Grace Gear (Scotland) Georgia Adderley (England) Millie Tomlinson
Telsa Media David Lloyd Purley Open; Croydon, England; Men : Challenger 3; 16 players – $3,000 −−−−−− Women : Challenger 3; 16 players – $3,000	11–13 November	(England) Finnlay Withington; 11–6, 7–11, 11–7, 11–5 (1st PSA title)	(England) Perry Malik	(England) Miles Jenkins (New Zealand) Joel Arscott	(Kuwait) Ammar Al-Tamimi (England) Noah Meredith (England) Will Salter (England) Hasnaat Farooqi
Telsa Media David Lloyd Purley Open; Croydon, England; Men : Challenger 3; 16 players – $3,000 −−−−−− Women : Challenger 3; 16 players – $3,000	11–13 November	(England) Torrie Malik; 11–6, 11–9, 10–12, 12–10 (2nd PSA title)	(England) Asia Harris	(England) Isabel McCullough (England) Kiera Marshall	(Pakistan) Amna Fayyaz (England) Polly Clark (Portugal) Sofia Aveiro (England) Katie Cox
Open Feminin du Jeu de Paume; Paris, France; Women : Challenger 3; 16 players – $3,000	11–13 November	(Switzerland) Ambre Allinckx; 11–5, 11–3, 11–8 (3rd PSA title)	(France) Taba Taghavi	(Denmark) Klara Møller (Republic of Ireland) Breanne Flynn	(Egypt) Fareda Rakaybi (Netherlands) Juliette Permentier (France) Ella Gálová (Czech Republic) Tamara Holzbauerová
Men's Kinetic 5K Challenger; Boynton Beach, United States; Men : Challenger 5; 16 players – $6,000	15–18 November	(Argentina) Jeremías Azaña; 4–11, 9–11, 11–7, 11–5, 11–4 (1st PSA title)	(England) Tom Walsh	(Guatemala) Alejandro Enríquez (New Zealand) Anthony Lepper	(Malaysia) Asyraf Azan (Guatemala) Ricardo Toscano (Malaysia) Sanjay Jeeva (Canada) David Baillargeon
Wake Up Squash Angers International; Angers, France; Women : Challenger 3; 16 players – $3,000	15–18 November	(Denmark) Klara Møller; 11–9, 11–4, 11–8 (1st PSA title)	(Denmark) Caroline Lyng	(Netherlands) Sanne Veldkamp (France) Kara Lincou	(France) Ella Gálová (France) Ana Munos (Switzerland) Ambre Allinckx (Hungary) Kincső Szász
MARIGOLD Singapore Squash Open; Kallang, Singapore; Men : World Tour Gold; 24 players – $110,000 −−−−−− Women : World Tour Gold; 24 players – $110,000	15–20 November	(England) Mohamed El Shorbagy; 11–6, 11–6, 11–8 (48th PSA title)	(Peru) Diego Elías	(Wales) Joel Makin (Egypt) Mostafa Asal	(Malaysia) Eain Yow (Egypt) Tarek Momen (Egypt) Mazen Hesham (France) Victor Crouin
MARIGOLD Singapore Squash Open; Kallang, Singapore; Men : World Tour Gold; 24 players – $110,000 −−−−−− Women : World Tour Gold; 24 players – $110,000	15–20 November	(New Zealand) Joelle King; 11–6, 12–10, 11–4 (16th PSA title)	(Egypt) Nour El Tayeb	(United States) Sabrina Sobhy (United States) Amanda Sobhy	(Belgium) Nele Gilis (England) Sarah-Jane Perry (Belgium) Tinne Gilis (Egypt) Rowan Elaraby
London Open; London, England; Men : Challenger 20; 24 players – $20,000 −−−−−− Women : Challenger 10; 24 players – $12,000	16–20 November	(Egypt) Aly Abou Eleinen; 11–6, 4–11, 11–3, 11–8 (2nd PSA title)	(England) Nathan Lake	(England) George Parker (England) Nick Wall	(England) Simon Herbert (England) Joe Lee (England) Curtis Malik (Argentina) Leandro Romiglio
London Open; London, England; Men : Challenger 20; 24 players – $20,000 −−−−−− Women : Challenger 10; 24 players – $12,000	16–20 November	(Egypt) Hana Moataz; 13–11, 11–9, 4–11, 18–16 (6th PSA title)	(Scotland) Georgia Adderley	(England) Millie Tomlinson (England) Alicia Mead	(England) Torrie Malik (England) Katie Malliff (England) Asia Harris (England) Anna Kimberley
Romanian Open; Florești, Romania; Men : Challenger 5; 16 players – $6,000	17–20 November	(England) Ben Smith; 11–9, 3–11, 11–5, 11–9 (3rd PSA title)	(Czech Republic) Marek Panáček	(Scotland) Alasdair Prott (Spain) Nilo Vidal	(Czech Republic) Ondřej Vorlíček (Wales) Elliott Morris Devred (Czech Republic) David Zeman (Spain) Marc López
4th HCL SRFI Indian Tour – Jodhpur; Jodhpur, India; Men : Challenger 10; 24 players – $12,000 −−−−−− Women : Challenger 10; 24 players – $12,000	17–21 November	(India) Abhay Singh; 13–11, 7–11, 11–9, 11–8 (5th PSA title)	(Egypt) Zahed Salem	(India) Velavan Senthilkumar (Malaysia) Ong Sai Hung	(Egypt) Mohamed Nasser (India) Harinder Pal Sandhu (Egypt) Abdelrahman Abdelkhalek (Malaysia) Darren Rahul Pragasam
4th HCL SRFI Indian Tour – Jodhpur; Jodhpur, India; Men : Challenger 10; 24 players – $12,000 −−−−−− Women : Challenger 10; 24 players – $12,000	17–21 November	(Egypt) Amina Orfi; 11–6, 11–9, 12–10 (1st PSA title)	(Malaysia) Aira Azman	(India) Akanksha Salunkhe (Hong Kong) Cheng Nga Ching	(India) Sunayna Kuruvilla (Egypt) Nour Khafagy (India) Tanvi Khanna (Hong Kong) Heylie Fung
2nd Kuwait International Championship; Ministries Zone, Kuwait; Men : Challenger 10; 24 players – $12,000	19–23 November	(Kuwait) Abdullah Al-Muzayen; 11–6, 14–12, 11–6 (21st PSA title)	(Egypt) Yassin ElShafei	(Kuwait) Falah Mohammad (Egypt) Seif Shenawy	(England) Perry Malik (Kuwait) Ammar Al-Tamimi (Egypt) Ziad Ibrahim (Czech Republic) Martin Švec
Women's Kinetic 5K Challenger; Boynton Beach, United States; Women : Challenger 5; 16 players – $6,000	22–25 November	(Malaysia) Wen Li Lai; 11–7, 11–7, 11–5 (4th PSA title)	(Ecuador) Mª Paula Moya	(Japan) Risa Sugimoto (United States) Anna Shumway	(Japan) Erisa Sano (United States) Riya Navani (Guatemala) Mary Mijas (Canada) Hannah Blatt
Malaysian Open; Kuala Lumpur, Malaysia; Men : World Tour Bronze; 24 players – $52,500 −−−−−− Women : World Tour Bronze; 24 players – $52,500	22–26 November	(Egypt) Mazen Hesham; 2–11, 8–11, 11–6, 11–8, 11–5 (8th PSA title)	(Egypt) Tarek Momen	(Wales) Joel Makin (Switzerland) Nicolas Müller	(Egypt) Marwan El Shorbagy (Colombia) Miguel Á Rodríguez (Malaysia) Addeen Idrakie (England) Patrick Rooney
Malaysian Open; Kuala Lumpur, Malaysia; Men : World Tour Bronze; 24 players – $52,500 −−−−−− Women : World Tour Bronze; 24 players – $52,500	22–26 November	(Belgium) Nele Gilis; 5–11, 11–5, 13–11, 11–9 (10th PSA title)	(United States) Olivia Fiechter	(Malaysia) Rachel Arnold (Wales) Tesni Evans	(France) Mélissa Alves (Egypt) Nadine Shahin (Egypt) Yathreb Adel (Malaysia) Aifa Azman
St George's Hill LTC Open; Weybridge, England; Men : Challenger 10; 16 players – $12,000	23–26 November	(England) Sam Todd; 15–13, 9–11, 11–9, 11–4 (5th PSA title)	(England) Miles Jenkins	(England) James Willstrop (England) Ben Coleman	(Wales) Emyr Evans (England) Joe Lee (England) Ben Smith (Wales) Owain Taylor
PSA Cognac Open; Châteaubernard, France; Men : Challenger 5; 24 players – $6,000 −−−−−− Women : Challenger 5; 24 players – $6,000	23–27 November	(Spain) Iván Pérez; 11–8, 11–6, 11–7 (4th PSA title)	(Egypt) Abdalah El Masry	(Germany) Valentin Rapp (France) Toufik Mekhalfi	(Switzerland) Yannick Wilhelmi (Egypt) Mohamed Nasser (Argentina) Robertino Pezzota (Czech Republic) Ondřej Vorlíček
PSA Cognac Open; Châteaubernard, France; Men : Challenger 5; 24 players – $6,000 −−−−−− Women : Challenger 5; 24 players – $6,000	23–27 November	(Egypt) Menna Hamed; 11–7, 11–2, 11–7 (7th PSA title)	(Switzerland) Ambre Allinckx	(Japan) Akari Midorikawa (Scotland) Katriona Allen	(France) Ella Gálová (France) Taba Taghavi (England) Isabel McCullough (France) Ninon Lemarchand
Torneo Challenger de Anivesario CDP; San Luis Potosí, Mexico; Men : Challenger 3; 16 players – $3,000	24–27 November	(Mexico) Leo Vargas; 7–11, 11–6, 11–7, 11–6 (1st PSA title)	(Mexico) Carlos Vargas	(Mexico) Bryan Cueto (Mexico) Rodolfo Vega	(Guatemala) Luis Quisquinay (Mexico) Alfredo López (Mexico) Alejandro Reyes (Mexico) Jorge Gómez
Monte Carlo Classic; Fontvieille, Monaco; Women : Challenger 20; 24 players – $20,000	28 Nov. – 2 Dec.	(France) Mélissa Alves; 11–7, 10–12, 11–7, 11–9 (8th PSA title)	(Egypt) Rana Ismail	(Egypt) Nour Heikal (France) Marie Stephan	(England) Torrie Malik (England) Lucy Turmel (England) Alicia Mead (Egypt) Menna Hamed
Sutton Coldfield International; Sutton Coldfield, England; Men : Challenger 5; 24 players – $6,000 −−−−−− Women : Challenger 5; 24 players – $6,000	29 Nov. – 3 Dec.	(Wales) Emyr Evans; 11–2, 11–7, 4–11, 11–5 (1st PSA title)	(England) Simon Herbert	(Wales) Elliott Morris Devred (Scotland) Alasdair Prott	(England) James Peach (New Zealand) Temwa Chileshe (England) Ben Smith (England) Stuart MacGregor
Sutton Coldfield International; Sutton Coldfield, England; Men : Challenger 5; 24 players – $6,000 −−−−−− Women : Challenger 5; 24 players – $6,000	29 Nov. – 3 Dec.	(Egypt) Amina Orfi; 11–9, 11–4, 11–3 (2nd PSA title)	(New Zealand) Kaitlyn Watts	(Egypt) Hana Ismail (England) Anna Kimberley	(Scotland) Katriona Allen (Finland) Emilia Korhonen (Scotland) Alison Thomson (England) Asia Harris
Everbright Securities International HK Open; Hong Kong, China; Men : World Tour Platinum; 48 players - $170,000 −−−−−− Women : World Tour Platinum; 48 players - $170,000	28 Nov. – 4 Dec.	(Egypt) Mostafa Asal; 6–11, 6–11, 12–10, 11–9, 11–4 (10th PSA title)	(Peru) Diego Elías	(New Zealand) Paul Coll (England) Mohamed El Shorbagy	(Egypt) Marwan El Shorbagy (Egypt) Youssef Soliman (Egypt) Mazen Hesham (France) Victor Crouin
Everbright Securities International HK Open; Hong Kong, China; Men : World Tour Platinum; 48 players - $170,000 −−−−−− Women : World Tour Platinum; 48 players - $170,000	28 Nov. – 4 Dec.	(Egypt) Hania El Hammamy; 15–13, 9–11, 11–3, 8–11, 11–9 (11th PSA title)	(Egypt) Nour El Sherbini	(Egypt) Nouran Gohar (New Zealand) Joelle King	(Egypt) Nour El Tayeb (Japan) Satomi Watanabe (Belgium) Nele Gilis (England) Sarah-Jane Perry
HSC International Squash Open; Houston, United States; Men : Challenger 10; 24 players – $12,000	30 Nov. – 4 Dec.	(Mexico) Alfredo Ávila; 11–7, 11–3, 7–1^{rtd.} (18th PSA title)	(Pakistan) Asim Khan	(United States) Andrew Douglas (Colombia) Andrés Herrera	(United States) Spencer Lovejoy (Pakistan) Ashab Irfan (Egypt) Mohamad Zakaria (Canada) Connor Turk

=== December ===
Tournament	Date	Champion	Runner-Up	Semifinalists	Quarterfinalists
Hong Kong Football Club Open; Hong Kong, China; Men : World Tour Bronze; 24 players – $55,000	6–10 December	(Egypt) Marwan El Shorbagy; 11–8, 5–11, 11–9, 11–8 (13th PSA title)	(Egypt) Mazen Hesham	(Egypt) Youssef Soliman (Switzerland) Dimitri Steinmann	(Egypt) Mohamed ElSherbini (Spain) Iker Pajares (Malaysia) Eain Yow (Egypt) Mohamed Abouelghar
Harrogate Squash Open; Harrogate, England; Men : Challenger 3; 16 players – $3,000	8–11 December	(England) Finnlay Withington; 11–4, 9–11, 11–7, 11–3 (2nd PSA title)	(England) Perry Malik	(New Zealand) Temwa Chileshe (New Zealand) Lwamba Chileshe	(England) Lewis Doughty (Scotland) Alasdair Prott (New Zealand) Elijah Thomas (New Zealand) Joel Arscott
Wakefield PSA Open; The Plains, United States; Men : Challenger 10; 16 players – $12,000	13–16 December	(Canada) David Baillargeon; 8–11, 6–11, 14–12, 11–1, 11–2 (5th PSA title)	(Czech Republic) Daniel Mekbib	(Pakistan) Asim Khan (Malaysia) Sanjay Jeeva	(Egypt) Abdelrahman Nassar (England) Mark Broekman (South Africa) Dewald van Niekerk (Pakistan) Ashab Irfan
Costa del Sol Open; Fuengirola, Spain; Men : Challenger 3; 16 players – $3,000	15–17 December	(Argentina) Robertino Pezzota; 11–6, 13–11, 10–12, 10–12, 11–4 (12th PSA title)	(France) Edwin Clain	(Spain) Augusto Ortigosa (Spain) Javier Martín	(Belgium) Lowie Delbeke (England) Lewis Doughty (Spain) Pablo Quintana (Spain) Nilo Vidal
Daly College & SquashXtreme SRFI Open; Indore, India; Men : Challenger 10; 24 players – $12,000 −−−−−− Women : Challenger 10; 24 players – $12,000	18–22 December	(India) Abhay Singh; 11–7, 9–11, 11–8, 4–11, 11–7 (6th PSA title)	(Egypt) Zahed Salem	(France) Macéo Lévy (Egypt) Aly Hussein	(Egypt) Mohamed Gohar (India) Veer Chotrani (India) Velavan Senthilkumar (Egypt) Seif Ashraf
Daly College & SquashXtreme SRFI Open; Indore, India; Men : Challenger 10; 24 players – $12,000 −−−−−− Women : Challenger 10; 24 players – $12,000	18–22 December	(Egypt) Menna Hamed; 11–5, 6–11, 13–11, 9–11, 12–10 (8th PSA title)	(India) Tanvi Khanna	(India) Akanksha Salunkhe (Egypt) Lojayn Gohary	(Egypt) Ingy Hammouda (India) Sanika Choudhari (India) Urwashi Joshi (Egypt) Amina El Rihany
4th Sylvester Trophy; Uster, Switzerland; Men : WSF & PSA Satellite; 8 players – $3,000	28–29 December	(Switzerland) David Bernet; 12–10, 11–4, 11–8	(Switzerland) Miguel Mathis	(Switzerland) Joel Siewerdt (Netherlands) Rene Mijs	(Republic of Ireland) Michael Creaven (Switzerland) Fabian Seitz (Germany) Nils Herzberg (Egypt) Omar El Torkey

=== January ===
Tournament	Date	Champion	Runner-Up	Semifinalists	Quarterfinalists
Colwyn Classic; Rhos-on-Sea, Wales; Women : Challenger 5; 16 players - $6,000	4–7 January	(Wales) Emily Whitlock; 11–7, 11–7, 11–9 (19th PSA title)	(England) Katie Malliff	(England) Anna Kimberley (France) Élise Romba	(England) Kiera Marshall (Wales) Lowri Roberts (Netherlands) Juliette Permentier (England) Polly Clark
501 Fun Colin Payne Kent Open; Tunbridge Wells, England; Men : Challenger 3; 16 players – $3,000 −−−−−− Women : Challenger 3; 16 players – $3,000	11–14 January	(Wales) Owain Taylor; 10–12, 11–6, 11–8, 10–12, 11–5 (1st PSA title)	(England) Noah Meredith	(Germany) Valentin Rapp (England) Perry Malik	(New Zealand) Temwa Chileshe (Republic of Ireland) Alex Smith (Austria) Aqeel Rehman (England) Will Salter
501 Fun Colin Payne Kent Open; Tunbridge Wells, England; Men : Challenger 3; 16 players – $3,000 −−−−−− Women : Challenger 3; 16 players – $3,000	11–14 January	(England) Torrie Malik; 11–3, 11–4, 7–11, 12–10 (3rd PSA title)	(Scotland) Alison Thomson	(Malaysia) Yasshmita Jadishkumar (Wales) Ali Loke	(France) Élise Romba (Scotland) Katriona Allen (France) Ella Gálová (England) Polly Clark
Houston Open; Houston, United States; Men : World Tour Gold; 24 players – $110,000	11–15 January	(Egypt) Mostafa Asal; 11–6, 11–7, 11–2 (11th PSA title)	(England) Mohamed El Shorbagy	(Egypt) Mazen Hesham (Egypt) Marwan El Shorbagy	(Egypt) Youssef Soliman (France) Grégoire Marche (France) Victor Crouin (Mexico) Leonel Cárdenas
Carol Weymuller Open; New York City, United States; Women : World Tour Bronze; 24 players – $51,250	11–15 January	(England) Georgina Kennedy; 11–7, 12–10, 12–10 (10th PSA title)	(United States) Olivia Fiechter	(Japan) Satomi Watanabe (Egypt) Yathreb Adel	(Egypt) Hana Moataz (Malaysia) Aifa Azman (Egypt) Salma Hany (Egypt) Salma El Tayeb
KCC PSA Challenge Cup; Hong Kong, China; Men : Challenger 10; 24 players – $12,000 −−−−−− Women : Challenger 10; 24 players – $12,000	16–20 January	(Kuwait) Abdullah Al-Muzayen; 12–10, 13–11, 11–1 (22nd PSA title)	(Hong Kong) Andes Ling	(Hong Kong) Ho Ka Hei (Hong Kong) Tang Ming Hong	(Malaysia) Wee Ming Hock (Japan) Tomotaka Endo (Hong Kong) Wong Chi Him (Hong Kong) Matthew Lai
KCC PSA Challenge Cup; Hong Kong, China; Men : Challenger 10; 24 players – $12,000 −−−−−− Women : Challenger 10; 24 players – $12,000	16–20 January	(Malaysia) Aira Azman; 11–8, 11–8, 11–7 (2nd PSA title)	(Hong Kong) Cheng Nga Ching	(Malaysia) Heng Wai Wong (Japan) Akari Midorikawa	(Hong Kong) Toby Tse (Hong Kong) Kirstie Wong (Hong Kong) Ena Kwong (Hong Kong) Heylie Fung
J.P. Morgan Tournament of Champions; New York City, United States; Men : World Tour Platinum; 48 players – $180,000 −−−−−− Women : World Tour Platinum; 48 players – $180,000	18–26 January	(Peru) Diego Elías; 11–2, 11–6, 11–4 (13th PSA title)	(Egypt) Marwan El Shorbagy	(New Zealand) Paul Coll (Colombia) Miguel Á Rodríguez	(Egypt) Mazen Hesham (Egypt) Tarek Momen (Egypt) Fares Dessouky (France) Victor Crouin
J.P. Morgan Tournament of Champions; New York City, United States; Men : World Tour Platinum; 48 players – $180,000 −−−−−− Women : World Tour Platinum; 48 players – $180,000	18–26 January	(Egypt) Nour El Sherbini; 11–9, 3–1^{rtd.} (32nd PSA title)	(Egypt) Nouran Gohar	(Egypt) Hania El Hammamy (New Zealand) Joelle King	(Egypt) Nour El Tayeb (United States) Amanda Sobhy (Egypt) Jana Shiha (England) Georgina Kennedy
Christianson Classic; Medicine Hat, Canada; Men : Challenger 5; 16 players - $6,000	26–29 January	(Mexico) Alfredo Ávila; 11–6, 11–3, 11–9 (19th PSA title)	(Wales) Emyr Evans	(Canada) Liam Marrison (Mexico) Miled Zarazúa	(Pakistan) Naveed Rehman (Mexico) Carlos Vargas (Canada) Connor Turk (Colombia) Nicolás Serna
Faltami Squash Inn Classic; Mexico City, Mexico; Women : Challenger 5; 16 players – $6,000	26–29 January	(Mexico) Diana García; 11–6, 7–11, 11–7, 11–5 (3rd PSA title)	(Colombia) Laura Tovar	(Mexico) Diana Gasca (Malaysia) Yasshmita Jadishkumar	(Colombia) Lucía Bautista (Colombia) María Tovar (Mexico) Julieta Mondragón (Hungary) Kincső Szász
4th HCL SRFI Indian Tour – Delhi; Delhi, India; Men : Challenger 5; 32 players – $6,000 −−−−−− Women : Challenger 5; 24 players – $6,000	28 Jan. – 1 Feb.	(India) Abhay Singh; 10–12, 11–7, 11–4, 11–9 (7th PSA title)	(Egypt) Yassin ElShafei	(Japan) Tomotaka Endo (Hong Kong) Matthew Lai	(India) Harinder Pal Sandhu (India) Sandeep Ramachandran (France) Toufik Mekhalfi (South Korea) Hoony Lee
4th HCL SRFI Indian Tour – Delhi; Delhi, India; Men : Challenger 5; 32 players – $6,000 −−−−−− Women : Challenger 5; 24 players – $6,000	28 Jan. – 1 Feb.	(Egypt) Amina Orfi; 11–4, 11–1, 8–11, 11–7 (3rd PSA title)	(India) Tanvi Khanna	(Egypt) Nour Ramy (Egypt) Menna Walid	(Egypt) Salma El-Alfy (Egypt) Nadeen Kotb (Egypt) Malak Fathy (Serbia) Jelena Dutina

=== February ===
Tournament	Date	Champion	Runner-Up	Semifinalists	Quarterfinalists
Sturbridge Capital Motor City Open; Bloomfield Hills, United States; Men : World Tour Silver; 24 players – $80,000	1–5 February	(Peru) Diego Elías; 11–3, 11–4, 6–11, 11–3 (14th PSA title)	(Egypt) Mazen Hesham	(Egypt) Tarek Momen (Egypt) Fares Dessouky	(New Zealand) Paul Coll (Egypt) Youssef Soliman (Colombia) Miguel Á Rodríguez (France) Grégoire Marche
Cleveland Classic; Pepper Pike, United States; Women : World Tour Silver; 24 players – $75,000	1–5 February	(England) Georgina Kennedy; 13–11, 11–8, 7–11, 11–6 (11th PSA title)	(United States) Olivia Clyne	(United States) Olivia Fiechter (Hong Kong) Tomato Ho	(New Zealand) Joelle King (Wales) Tesni Evans (United States) Amanda Sobhy (Egypt) Nour El Tayeb
EM Noll Classic; Philadelphia, United States; Men : Challenger 10; 16 players – $12,000	2–5 February	(England) Charlie Lee; 11–2, 11–7, 11–2 (3rd PSA title)	(Egypt) Seif Shenawy	(United States) Andrew Douglas (Spain) Bernat Jaume	(United States) Christopher Gordon (Egypt) Ibrahim Elkabbani (Hong Kong) Tang Ming Hong (Egypt) Zahed Salem
DAC Pro Squash Classic; Detroit, United States; Women : World Tour Silver; 24 players – $82,500	7–11 February	(United States) Olivia Fiechter; 11–7, 11–5, 6–11, 11–9 (4th PSA title)	(England) Georgina Kennedy	(United States) Olivia Clyne (Egypt) Salma Hany	(Egypt) Nada Abbas (New Zealand) Joelle King (Egypt) Rowan Elaraby (Belgium) Nele Gilis
Pittsburgh Open; Pittsburgh, United States; Men : World Tour Silver; 24 players - $75,500	8–12 February	(Peru) Diego Elías; 11–5, 11–7, 11–2 (15th PSA title)	(Egypt) Marwan El Shorbagy	(Egypt) Youssef Soliman (Egypt) Mohamed Abouelghar	(Egypt) Ali Farag (Egypt) Mazen Hesham (Wales) Joel Makin (Colombia) Miguel Á Rodríguez
Gaynor Cincinnati Cup; Cincinnati, United States; Women : World Tour Silver; 24 players – $75,000	12–16 February	(Egypt) Nouran Gohar; 12–10, 11–8, 11–6 (20th PSA title)	(United States) Olivia Clyne	(Egypt) Salma Hany (England) Georgina Kennedy	(Canada) Hollie Naughton (Egypt) Rowan Elaraby (England) Lucy Turmel (Egypt) Sana Ibrahim
Oxford Properties Canadian Open; Calgary, Canada; Men : World Tour Bronze; 24 players – $55,000	13–17 February	(Wales) Joel Makin; 11–9, 11–4, 6–11, 12–10 (5th PSA title)	(France) Victor Crouin	(Colombia) Miguel Á Rodríguez (Mexico) Leonel Cárdenas	(France) Auguste Dussourd (Egypt) Mohamed ElSherbini (England) Nick Wall (Switzerland) Nicolas Müller
Expression Networks BVAC Women's Open; Calgary, Canada; Women : Challenger 10; 24 players – $12,000	13–17 February	(Mexico) Diana García; 5–11, 11–4, 11–8, 11–7 (4th PSA title)	(Canada) Nicole Bunyan	(France) Marie Stephan (New Zealand) Kaitlyn Watts	(Hong Kong) Cheng Nga Ching (France) Énora Villard (England) Alicia Mead (Egypt) Zeina Zein
Squash on Fire Open; Washington, D.C., United States; Men : World Tour Bronze; 24 players – $50,000 −−−−−− Women : World Tour Bronze; 24 players – $50,000	22–26 February	(France) Victor Crouin; 11–7, 7–11, 11–7, 11–5 (19th PSA title)	(Egypt) Mohamed ElSherbini	(India) Saurav Ghosal (Spain) Iker Pajares	(Hong Kong) Alex Lau (Egypt) Omar Mosaad (Egypt) Karim El Hammamy (Egypt) Moustafa El Sirty
Squash on Fire Open; Washington, D.C., United States; Men : World Tour Bronze; 24 players – $50,000 −−−−−− Women : World Tour Bronze; 24 players – $50,000	22–26 February	(Belgium) Tinne Gilis; 11–9, 11–5, 11–3 (5th PSA title)	(Egypt) Amina Orfi	(United States) Sabrina Sobhy (Egypt) Farida Mohamed	(Egypt) Sana Ibrahim (Egypt) Nada Abbas (Egypt) Nadine Shahin (England) Katie Malliff
MRU Open; Calgary, Canada; Men : Challenger 10; 16 players - $12,000	23–26 February	(Canada) David Baillargeon; 11–9, 11–7, 11–6 (6th PSA title)	(England) Simon Herbert	(India) Abhay Singh (England) Curtis Malik	(England) Finnlay Withington (France) Edwin Clain (Australia) Joseph White (England) Ben Smith
CSC Delaware Open; Greenville, United States; Women : Challenger 10; 16 players - $12,000	23–26 February	(Egypt) Kenzy Ayman; 13–11, 11–8, 7–11, 11–4 (3rd PSA title)	(Hong Kong) Lee Ka Yi	(Malaysia) Yee Xin Ying (New Zealand) Kaitlyn Watts	(Malaysia) Wen Li Lai (Malaysia) Chan Yiwen (India) Akanksha Salunkhe (Malaysia) Low Wee Wern

=== March ===
Tournament	Date	Champion	Runner-Up	Semifinalists	Quarterfinalists
Guilfoyle PSA Squash Classic; Toronto, Canada; Men : Challenger 10; 16 players - $12,000	1–4 March	(England) Charlie Lee; 11–6, 11–6, 11–5 (4th PSA title)	(England) Curtis Malik	(United States) Todd Harrity (England) Nathan Lake	(United States) Christopher Gordon (India) Abhay Singh (Hong Kong) Alex Lau (Mexico) Alfredo Ávila
Chestnut Hill Classic; Philadelphia, United States; Women : World Tour Bronze; 24 players – $51,250	2–6 March	(United States) Olivia Fiechter; 11–8, 7–11, 11–7, 11–8 (5th PSA title)	(United States) Olivia Clyne	(Belgium) Nele Gilis (France) Mélissa Alves	(Malaysia) Rachel Arnold (Egypt) Hana Moataz (Egypt) Jana Shiha (Hong Kong) Tong Tsz Wing
Black Ball Squash Open; New Cairo, Egypt; Men : World Tour Gold; 24 players – $110,000 −−−−−− Women : World Tour Gold; 24 players – $110,000	2–7 March	(England) Mohamed El Shorbagy; 14–12, 11–8, 11–7 (49th PSA title)	(Egypt) Tarek Momen	(Peru) Diego Elías (Wales) Joel Makin	(Egypt) Fares Dessouky (Egypt) Marwan El Shorbagy (Egypt) Mazen Hesham (Egypt) Ali Farag
Black Ball Squash Open; New Cairo, Egypt; Men : World Tour Gold; 24 players – $110,000 −−−−−− Women : World Tour Gold; 24 players – $110,000	2–7 March	(Egypt) Nouran Gohar; 11–9, 8–11, 12–10, 11–5 (21st PSA title)	(Egypt) Hania El Hammamy	(United States) Amanda Sobhy (New Zealand) Joelle King	(Egypt) Nour El Sherbini (England) Sarah-Jane Perry (Belgium) Tinne Gilis (England) Georgina Kennedy
Odense Open; Odense, Denmark; Men : Challenger 10; 24 players – $12,000 −−−−−− Women : Challenger 10; 24 players – $12,000	7–11 March	(Scotland) Rory Stewart; 11–4, 11–8, 10–12, 11–6 (9th PSA title)	(Spain) Bernat Jaume	(Hungary) Balázs Farkas (England) Ben Coleman	(Wales) Owain Taylor (Israel) Daniel Poleshchuk (Switzerland) Yannick Wilhelmi (Malaysia) Addeen Idrakie
Odense Open; Odense, Denmark; Men : Challenger 10; 24 players – $12,000 −−−−−− Women : Challenger 10; 24 players – $12,000	7–11 March	(Egypt) Malak Khafagy; 12–10, 11–6, 11–2 (1st PSA title)	(Finland) Emilia Soini	(New Zealand) Kaitlyn Watts (Spain) Marta Domínguez	(Malaysia) Yee Xin Ying (England) Torrie Malik (England) Alicia Mead (Switzerland) Nadia Pfister
2nd Bangamata International Tournament; Chittagong, Bangladesh; Men : Challenger 5; 32 players – $6,000	7–11 March	(Egypt) Ibrahim Elkabbani; 11–7, 12–10, 11–2 (3rd PSA title)	(Egypt) Seif Shenawy	(Hong Kong) Matthew Lai (Egypt) Hazem Hossam	(Hong Kong) Chung Yat Long (Malaysia) Darren Rahul Pragasam (Malaysia) Hafiz Zhafri (Hong Kong) Lam Shing Fung
SNS Foods Poznań Open; Poznań, Poland; Men : Challenger 3; 16 players - $3,000	9–11 March	(India) Velavan Senthilkumar; 11–5, 13–11, 9–11, 10–12, 11–7 (4th PSA title)	(Netherlands) Rowan Damming	(Scotland) Alasdair Prott (Spain) Nilo Vidal	(Spain) Marc López (England) Robert Downer (England) Noah Meredith (France) Laszlo Godde
Calgary CFO Women's Squash Week; Calgary, Canada; Women : Challenger 20; 24 players – $20,000	8–12 March	(England) Lucy Turmel; 11–5, 3–11, 9–11, 11–8, 11–7 (5th PSA title)	(England) Lucy Beecroft	(Hong Kong) Tomato Ho (Australia) Jessica Turnbull	(Canada) Danielle Letourneau (Egypt) Menna Hamed (England) Katie Malliff (Poland) Karina Tyma
The B&R Open; Toronto, Canada; Men : Challenger 10; 16 players – $12,000	9–12 March	(Argentina) Leandro Romiglio; 11–9, 11–13, 11–8, 11–8 (9th PSA title)	(Canada) David Baillargeon	(United States) Timothy Brownell (England) Tom Walsh	(Hong Kong) Alex Lau (Spain) Iván Pérez (England) Charlie Lee (United States) Andrew Douglas
University of the West of England Bristol Open; Bristol, England; Men : Challenger 3; 16 players – $3,000 −−−−−− Women : Challenger 3; 16 players – $3,000	10–12 March	(Wales) Elliott Morris Devred; 11–5, 11–3, 12–10 (2nd PSA title)	(England) Stuart MacGregor	(Republic of Ireland) Sam Buckley (England) James Peach	(England) Perry Malik (England) Miles Jenkins (England) Finnlay Withington (Switzerland) Miguel Mathis
University of the West of England Bristol Open; Bristol, England; Men : Challenger 3; 16 players – $3,000 −−−−−− Women : Challenger 3; 16 players – $3,000	10–12 March	(Scotland) Alison Thomson; 8–11, 11–5, 11–4, 11–9 (3rd PSA title)	(England) Asia Harris	(England) Anna Kimberley (Malaysia) Yasshmita Jadishkumar	(England) Polly Clark (England) Katie Wells (Wales) Lowri Roberts (England) Kiera Marshall
GillenMarkets Canary Wharf Classic; London, England; Men : World Tour Gold; 24 players – $110,000	12–17 March	(New Zealand) Paul Coll; 7–11, 11–6, 11–4, 11–4 (20th PSA title)	(Wales) Joel Makin	(Egypt) Mostafa Asal (Egypt) Ali Farag	(England) Mohamed El Shorbagy (Egypt) Mazen Hesham (Egypt) Tarek Momen (France) Baptiste Masotti
St. James Classic; North Springfield, United States; Women : Challenger 20; 24 players – $20,000	14–18 March	(Hong Kong) Chan Sin Yuk; 12–10, 11–8, 11–7 (7th PSA title)	(Egypt) Farida Mohamed	(England) Katie Malliff (Egypt) Jana Shiha	(England) Alicia Mead (Egypt) Nada Abbas (Egypt) Salma El Tayeb (Malaysia) Yee Xin Ying
HK Squash PSA Challenge Cup; Hong Kong, China; Men : Challenger 5; 24 players - $6,000 −−−−−− Women : Challenger 5; 24 players - $6,000	15–18 March	(Hong Kong) Tang Ming Hong; 11–9, 11–7, 11–9 (5th PSA title)	(France) Toufik Mekhalfi	(Hong Kong) Matthew Lai (Hong Kong) Chung Yat Long	(France) Macéo Lévy (Hong Kong) Andes Ling (Philippines) Robert Garcia (Hong Kong) Ho Ka Hei
HK Squash PSA Challenge Cup; Hong Kong, China; Men : Challenger 5; 24 players - $6,000 −−−−−− Women : Challenger 5; 24 players - $6,000	15–18 March	(Malaysia) Ainaa Amani; 11–3, 11–5, 11–2 (1st PSA title)	(Hong Kong) Cheng Nga Ching	(Malaysia) Heng Wai Wong (Hong Kong) Heylie Fung	(Egypt) Menna Walid (Hong Kong) Toby Tse (Hong Kong) Kirstie Wong (Hong Kong) Ena Kwong
Oasis Pools & Spas Manitoba Open; Winnipeg, Canada; Men : Challenger 10; 24 players – $12,000	15–19 March	(Mexico) Leonel Cárdenas; 4–11, 11–8, 11–4, 12–10 (13th PSA title)	(Canada) David Baillargeon	(Spain) Iván Pérez (England) Ben Smith	(England) Tom Walsh (United States) Andrew Douglas (Colombia) Edgar Ramírez (Mexico) Leo Vargas
Women's Mozart Open; Salzburg, Austria; Women : Challenger 5; 16 players – $6,000	22–25 March	(England) Torrie Malik; 11–6, 8–11, 11–7, 11–8 (4th PSA title)	(Egypt) Haya Ali	(Egypt) Malak Khafagy (Scotland) Alison Thomson	(Spain) Sofía Mateos (Germany) Katerina Týcová (Austria) Jacqueline Peychär (France) Léa Barbeau
OptAsia Championships; London, England; Men : World Tour Gold; 24 players – $108,500	21–26 March	(Egypt) Karim Abdel Gawad; 11–4, 11–7, 11–3 (25th PSA title)	(Egypt) Youssef Soliman	(Egypt) Mazen Hesham (France) Baptiste Masotti	(Egypt) Ali Farag (Malaysia) Eain Yow (Wales) Joel Makin (England) Charlie Lee
Canadian Women's Open; Toronto, Canada; Women : World Tour Bronze; 24 players – $51,250	26–30 March	(United States) Amanda Sobhy; 8–11, 11–5, 11–5, 11–6 (20th PSA title)	(Egypt) Salma Hany	(United States) Sabrina Sobhy (United States) Olivia Clyne	(Malaysia) Sivasangari Subramaniam (England) Lucy Beecroft (Canada) Hollie Naughton (Wales) Emily Whitlock
Liverpool Cricket Club Open; Liverpool, England; Men : Challenger 5; 16 players – $6,000 −−−−−− Women : Challenger 5; 16 players – $6,000	29 Mar. – 1 Apr.	(England) Ben Smith; 10–12, 11–9, 13–11, 11–8 (4th PSA title)	(England) Perry Malik	(England) Miles Jenkins (England) James Peach	(New Zealand) Lwamba Chileshe (New Zealand) Temwa Chileshe (Wales) Owain Taylor (South Africa) Dewald van Niekerk
Liverpool Cricket Club Open; Liverpool, England; Men : Challenger 5; 16 players – $6,000 −−−−−− Women : Challenger 5; 16 players – $6,000	29 Mar. – 1 Apr.	(England) Torrie Malik; 11–9, 11–5, 12–10 (5th PSA title)	(England) Alicia Mead	(Australia) Alex Haydon (Scotland) Alison Thomson	(Wales) Ali Loke (New Zealand) Kaitlyn Watts (Germany) Katerina Týcová (England) Anna Kimberley
Men's Mozart Open; Salzburg, Austria; Men : Challenger 5; 16 players – $6,000	29 Mar. – 1 Apr.	(England) Simon Herbert; 12–10, 11–7, 11–9 (3rd PSA title)	(Switzerland) Robin Gadola	(Finland) Miko Äijänen (Switzerland) Yannick Wilhelmi	(Israel) Daniel Poleshchuk (Czech Republic) Jakub Solnický (England) Robert Downer (Austria) Aqeel Rehman
NextCloud Tekae TIPSSA Open; Mexico City, Mexico; Men : Challenger 5; 24 players – $6,000	29 Mar. – 2 Apr.	(Mexico) Alfredo Ávila; 11–8, 11–6, 11–5 (20th PSA title)	(Mexico) Jorge Gómez	(Mexico) Sebastián Salazar (Mexico) Leo Vargas	(Mexico) Alejandro Reyes (Guatemala) Luis Quisquinay (Mexico) Carlos Vargas (Mexico) Bryan Cueto
Edmonton Squash Club Open; Edmonton, Canada; Men : Challenger 5; 16 players – $6,000	30 Mar. – 2 Apr.	(Czech Republic) Viktor Byrtus; 4–11, 11–1, 11–5, 11–8 (1st PSA title)	(India) Veer Chotrani	(Malaysia) Sanjay Jeeva (Brazil) Diego Gobbi	(Canada) Liam Marrison (Hong Kong) Matthew Lai (Hong Kong) Harley Lam (Canada) Connor Turk

=== April ===
Tournament	Date	Champion	Runner-Up	Semifinalists	Quarterfinalists
Vikram Goyal SRFI Open; New Delhi, India; Women : Challenger 10; 24 players – $12,000	1–5 April	(Malaysia) Ainaa Amani; 11–8, 11–9, 11–9 (2nd PSA title)	(Egypt) Haya Ali	(Hong Kong) Cheng Nga Ching (Egypt) Malak Fathy	(India) Tanvi Khanna (Hong Kong) Heylie Fung (Egypt) Nour Ramy (Egypt) Lojayn Gohary
UCNY PSA Classic; New York City, United States; Men : Challenger 5; 16 players – $6,000	10–13 April	(Egypt) Yassin ElShafei; 11–8, 11–5, 12–10 (3rd PSA title)	(Egypt) Aly Hussein	(Pakistan) Nasir Iqbal (Pakistan) Noor Zaman	(Argentina) Jeremías Azaña (Mexico) Alejandro Reyes (Hong Kong) Matthew Lai (India) Abhishek Agarwal
Tournament	Date	Men's qualified players		Women's qualified players	
PSA World Championship Qualifying Event; Birmingham, England; Men : PSA Qualifying Event; 42 players – n/a −−−−−− Women : PSA Qualifying Event; 42 players – n/a	12–14 April	(England) Curtis Malik (Egypt) Mohamed Abouelghar (France) Edwin Clain (Malaysia) Ivan Yuen (India) Abhay Singh (England) Simon Herbert		(Spain) Marta Domínguez (Malaysia) Ainaa Amani (Malaysia) Aira Azman (Egypt) Zeina Zein (Egypt) Malak Khafagy (Malaysia) Yasshmita Jadishkumar	
Tournament	Date	Champion	Runner-Up	Semifinalists	Quarterfinalists
British Open; Birmingham, England; Men : World Tour Platinum; 48 players – $179,000 – Draw −−−−−− Women : World Tour Platinum; 48 players – $179,000 – Draw	9–16 April	(Egypt) Ali Farag; 13–11, 5–11, 11–8, 11–9 (30th PSA title)	(Peru) Diego Elías	(Egypt) Mazen Hesham (New Zealand) Paul Coll	(France) Victor Crouin (Egypt) Marwan El Shorbagy (Egypt) Karim Abdel Gawad (Egypt) Tarek Momen
British Open; Birmingham, England; Men : World Tour Platinum; 48 players – $179,000 – Draw −−−−−− Women : World Tour Platinum; 48 players – $179,000 – Draw	9–16 April	(Egypt) Nour El Sherbini; 11–9, 11–7, 11–1 (33rd PSA title)	(Egypt) Nouran Gohar	(United States) Amanda Sobhy (New Zealand) Joelle King	(Egypt) Rowan Elaraby (England) Georgina Kennedy (Egypt) Hania El Hammamy (England) Sarah-Jane Perry
BRESS Breda Open; Breda, Netherlands; Men : Challenger 5; 32 players – $6,000 −−−−−− Women : Challenger 5; 32 players – $6,000	12–16 April	(India) Velavan Senthilkumar; 11–7, 11–7, 11–4 (5th PSA title)	(Republic of Ireland) Sam Buckley	(Scotland) Alasdair Prott (Czech Republic) Jakub Solnický	(Switzerland) Robin Gadola (Republic of Ireland) Sean Conroy (Wales) Elliott Morris Devred (Hong Kong) Chung Yat Long
BRESS Breda Open; Breda, Netherlands; Men : Challenger 5; 32 players – $6,000 −−−−−− Women : Challenger 5; 32 players – $6,000	12–16 April	(Egypt) Haya Ali; 11–9, 11–6, 11–4 (1st PSA title)	(United States) Riya Navani	(Republic of Ireland) Breanne Flynn (Scotland) Katriona Allen	(Netherlands) Tessa ter Sluis (Egypt) Amina El Rihany (Netherlands) Sanne Veldkamp (France) Taba Taghavi
PSA de Normandie; Le Havre, France; Men : Challenger 3; 16 players – $3,000 −−−−−− Women : Challenger 3; 16 players – $3,000	13–16 April	(Finland) Miko Äijänen; 11–8, 11–5, 8–11, 9–11, 11–7 (6th PSA title)	(Netherlands) Rowan Damming	(France) Toufik Mekhalfi (Czech Republic) Ondřej Vorlíček	(England) Will Salter (France) Laouenan Loaëc (France) Macéo Lévy (Canada) Brett Schille
PSA de Normandie; Le Havre, France; Men : Challenger 3; 16 players – $3,000 −−−−−− Women : Challenger 3; 16 players – $3,000	13–16 April	(Wales) Lowri Roberts; 11–8, 11–4, 10–12, 11–3 (1st PSA title)	(Colombia) María Tovar	(France) Lauren Baltayan (Denmark) Caroline Lyng	(France) Ella Gálová (England) Polly Clark (France) Ana Munos (France) Lilou Brévard-Belliot
Cannon Kirk Irish Squash Open; Dublin, Republic of Ireland; Men : Challenger 20; 24 players – $20,000 −−−−−− Women : Challenger 20; 24 players – $20,000	18–22 April	(Malaysia) Eain Yow; 12–10, 11–3, 11–2 (6th PSA title)	(Egypt) Aly Abou Eleinen	(Egypt) Mohamed Abouelghar (United States) Shahjahan Khan	(France) Lucas Serme (England) Adrian Waller (Mexico) Leonel Cárdenas (England) Curtis Malik
Cannon Kirk Irish Squash Open; Dublin, Republic of Ireland; Men : Challenger 20; 24 players – $20,000 −−−−−− Women : Challenger 20; 24 players – $20,000	18–22 April	(England) Jasmine Hutton; 8–11, 11–5, 11–4, 11–9 (6th PSA title)	(Malaysia) Aira Azman	(South Africa) Alexandra Fuller (Egypt) Fayrouz Aboelkheir	(Egypt) Zeina Zein (England) Grace Gear (England) Lucy Beecroft (England) Alicia Mead
Batch Open; Paris, France; Men : Challenger 5; 24 players – $6,000	18–22 April	(Czech Republic) Jakub Solnický; 4–11, 11–9, 11–4, 11–7 (2nd PSA title)	(Spain) Iván Pérez	(France) Toufik Mekhalfi (France) Macéo Lévy	(France) Edwin Clain (France) Brice Nicolas (Czech Republic) Daniel Mekbib (New Zealand) Lwamba Chileshe
Women's Kinetic Orange Ball Challenger; Boynton Beach, United States; Women : Challenger 30; 24 players – $30,000	19–23 April	(Japan) Satomi Watanabe; 11–7, 11–8, 11–8 (8th PSA title)	(Egypt) Farida Mohamed	(Malaysia) Sivasangari Subramaniam (Wales) Emily Whitlock	(Egypt) Hana Moataz (Egypt) Jana Shiha (Australia) Jessica Turnbull (Canada) Nicole Bunyan
Atlanta Open; Sandy Springs, United States; Men : Challenger 10; 24 players – $12,000	19–23 April	(Egypt) Zahed Salem; 11–9, 8–11, 9–11, 11–3, 11–7 (6th PSA title)	(Japan) Ryūnosuke Tsukue	(United States) Timothy Brownell (Canada) David Baillargeon	(Egypt) Seif Shenawy (Malaysia) Ivan Yuen (Malaysia) Addeen Idrakie (United States) Christopher Gordon
Rochester Pro-Am; Rochester, United States; Men : Challenger 5; 24 players – $6,000	19–23 April	(Egypt) Yassin ElShafei; 8–11, 11–8, 11–8, 2–11, 11–8 (4th PSA title)	(Egypt) Aly Hussein	(India) Veer Chotrani (Argentina) Jeremías Azaña	(Brazil) Diego Gobbi (Brazil) Vinícius Rodrigues (Hong Kong) Matthew Lai (Mexico) Mario Yáñez
RC Pro Series; St. Louis, United States; Men : Challenger 10; 16 players – $12,000 −−−−−− Women : Challenger 10; 16 players – $12,000	26–29 April	(Mexico) César Salazar; 12–10, 3–11, 11–7, 12–10 (6th PSA title)	(Argentina) Leandro Romiglio	(Pakistan) Noor Zaman (Colombia) Juan Camilo Vargas	(Malaysia) Mohd Syafiq Kamal (Malaysia) Addeen Idrakie (Egypt) Yassin ElShafei (Egypt) Seif Shenawy
RC Pro Series; St. Louis, United States; Men : Challenger 10; 16 players – $12,000 −−−−−− Women : Challenger 10; 16 players – $12,000	26–29 April	(Egypt) Salma El Tayeb; 10–12, 1–11, 11–9, 11–4, 11–4 (2nd PSA title)	(Malaysia) Ainaa Amani	(Egypt) Haya Ali (Egypt) Kenzy Ayman	(Egypt) Nour Aboulmakarim (Mexico) Diana García (Ukraine) Alina Bushma (England) Saran Nghiem

=== May ===
Tournament	Date	Champion	Runner-Up	Semifinalists	Quarterfinalists
Dynam Cup SQ-Cube Open; Yokohama, Japan; Men : Challenger 10; 24 players – $12,000 −−−−−− Women : Challenger 5; 24 players – $6,000	2–6 May	(Japan) Ryūnosuke Tsukue; 11–5, 11–3, 11–2 (6th PSA title)	(Malaysia) Addeen Idrakie	(Hong Kong) Wong Chi Him (Hong Kong) Tang Ming Hong	(Malaysia) Mohd Syafiq Kamal (Japan) Tomotaka Endo (Hong Kong) Matthew Lai (Malaysia) Darren Rahul Pragasam
Dynam Cup SQ-Cube Open; Yokohama, Japan; Men : Challenger 10; 24 players – $12,000 −−−−−− Women : Challenger 5; 24 players – $6,000	2–6 May	(Hong Kong) Cheng Nga Ching; 11–9, 10–12, 5–11, 12–10, 11–3 (3rd PSA title)	(Malaysia) Low Wee Wern	(Hong Kong) Heylie Fung (South Korea) Heo Min-gyeong	(Japan) Risa Sugimoto (South Korea) Choe Yu-ra (Hong Kong) Toby Tse (South Korea) Park Sang-eun
Kiva Club Open; Santa Fe, United States; Men : Challenger 5; 16 players – $6,000	3–6 May	(Mexico) Alejandro Reyes; 11–7, 11–9, 11–3 (2nd PSA title)	(United States) Dillon Huang	(Guatemala) Luis Quisquinay (France) Laszlo Godde	(Mexico) Allan Núñez (Egypt) Ziad Sakr (Canada) Mitchell Kahnert (Egypt) Abdelaziz Hegazy
Villa la Angostura Patagonia Open; Villa La Angostura, Argentina; Men : Challenger 10; 24 players – $12,000	3–7 May	(Switzerland) Yannick Wilhelmi; 11–6, 11–6, 11–2 (3rd PSA title)	(France) Toufik Mekhalfi	(England) Tom Walsh (United States) Spencer Lovejoy	(Colombia) Edgar Ramírez (Argentina) Jeremías Azaña (Germany) Yannik Omlor (Brazil) Diego Gobbi
Open des Bretzels; Mulhouse, France; Women : Challenger 5; 24 players – $6,000	3–7 May	(France) Lauren Baltayan; 11–9, 11–8, 3–11, 11–3 (1st PSA title)	(Egypt) Ingy Hammouda	(France) Élise Romba (France) Léa Barbeau	(England) Asia Harris (Switzerland) Ambre Allinckx (France) Ninon Lemarchand (France) Ella Gálová
Hyder Trophy; New York City, United States; Men : Challenger 10; 16 players – $12,000 −−−−−− Women : Challenger 10; 16 players – $12,000	4–7 May	(Egypt) Yassin ElShafei; 11–1, 13–11, 11–13, 11–4 (5th PSA title)	(Israel) Daniel Poleshchuk	(Pakistan) Ashab Irfan (Malaysia) Sanjay Jeeva	(Pakistan) Noor Zaman (Spain) Iván Pérez (Egypt) Aly Hussein (Egypt) Mohamed Nasser
Hyder Trophy; New York City, United States; Men : Challenger 10; 16 players – $12,000 −−−−−− Women : Challenger 10; 16 players – $12,000	4–7 May	(Egypt) Haya Ali; 9–11, 10–12, 11–9, 11–7, 11–6 (2nd PSA title)	(India) Akanksha Salunkhe	(Mexico) Diana García (United States) Lucie Stefanoni	(Singapore) Wai Yhann Au Yeong (England) Alicia Mead (Australia) Alex Haydon (Austria) Jacqueline Peychär
PSA World Championship; Chicago, United States; Men : World Championship; 64 players – $500,000 - Draw −−−−−− Women : World Championship; 64 players – $500,000 - Draw	3–11 May	(Egypt) Ali Farag; 12–10, 11–6, 11–6 (31st PSA title) (4th World Championship title)	(Egypt) Karim Abdel Gawad	(England) Mohamed El Shorbagy (Egypt) Mostafa Asal	(Egypt) Mazen Hesham (Egypt) Tarek Momen (New Zealand) Paul Coll (Peru) Diego Elías
PSA World Championship; Chicago, United States; Men : World Championship; 64 players – $500,000 - Draw −−−−−− Women : World Championship; 64 players – $500,000 - Draw	3–11 May	(Egypt) Nour El Sherbini; 11–6, 11–4, 12–10 (34th PSA title) (7th World Championship title)	(Egypt) Nouran Gohar	(Egypt) Hania El Hammamy (New Zealand) Joelle King	(Belgium) Nele Gilis (Egypt) Nour El Tayeb (United States) Amanda Sobhy (England) Georgina Kennedy
Richmond Open; Richmond, United States; Women : Challenger 30; 24 players – $30,000	9–13 May	(Belgium) Tinne Gilis; 9–11, 11–7, 11–2, 11–2 (6th PSA title)	(Egypt) Nada Abbas	(France) Mélissa Alves (Malaysia) Rachel Arnold	(England) Katie Malliff (Egypt) Salma Hany (Egypt) Sana Ibrahim (Egypt) Hana Ramadan
XI Regatas Resistencia Open; Resistencia, Argentina; Men : Challenger 10; 24 players – $12,000 −−−−−− Women : Challenger 10; 24 players – $12,000	9–13 May	(Argentina) Leandro Romiglio; 11–4, 11–5, 11–2 (10th PSA title)	(Switzerland) Yannick Wilhelmi	(Colombia) Andrés Herrera (Colombia) Matías Knudsen	(England) Tom Walsh (United States) Spencer Lovejoy (France) Edwin Clain (Argentina) Jeremías Azaña
XI Regatas Resistencia Open; Resistencia, Argentina; Men : Challenger 10; 24 players – $12,000 −−−−−− Women : Challenger 10; 24 players – $12,000	9–13 May	(Colombia) Lucía Bautista; 7–11, 12–10, 11–8, 2–11, 11–3 (1st PSA title)	(Ukraine) Alina Bushma	(Netherlands) Tessa ter Sluis (Colombia) Laura Tovar	(Mexico) Sarahí López (Egypt) Ingy Hammouda (Japan) Erisa Sano (England) Polly Clark
Lagos State Squash Classic; Lagos, Nigeria; Men : Challenger 10; 24 players – $12,000 −−−−−− Women : Challenger 5; 16 players – $6,000	9–13 May	(England) Curtis Malik; 11–3, 11–7, 11–2 (7th PSA title)	(Czech Republic) Martin Švec	(Egypt) Mazen Gamal (England) Perry Malik	(Nigeria) Onaopemipo Adegoke (Nigeria) Kehinde Temitope (Egypt) Seif Tamer (France) Laouenan Loaëc
Lagos State Squash Classic; Lagos, Nigeria; Men : Challenger 10; 24 players – $12,000 −−−−−− Women : Challenger 5; 16 players – $6,000	9–13 May	(England) Torrie Malik; 11–4, 11–4, 11–6 (6th PSA title)	(Egypt) Malak Fathy	(France) Léa Barbeau (Nigeria) Olatunji Busayo	(Egypt) Mariam Ashraf (Nigeria) Abdulazeez Rofiat (Nigeria) Favour Utukpe (Nigeria) Blessing Isaac
Men's Paraguay Open; Asunción, Paraguay; Men : Challenger 10; 24 players – $12,000	16–20 May	(Argentina) Leandro Romiglio; 11–4, 11–7, 11–4 (11th PSA title)	(Argentina) Jeremías Azaña	(England) Tom Walsh (Switzerland) Yannick Wilhelmi	(France) Edwin Clain (France) Macéo Lévy (Germany) Yannik Omlor (Colombia) Andrés Herrera
Manchester Open; Manchester, England; Men : World Tour Silver; 24 players – $76,000 −−−−−− Women : World Tour Silver; 24 players – $76,000	17–21 May	(Egypt) Ali Farag; 10–12, 13–11, 11–2, 11–5 (32nd PSA title)	(Egypt) Karim Abdel Gawad	(Egypt) Tarek Momen (Wales) Joel Makin	(Switzerland) Nicolas Müller (Egypt) Fares Dessouky (England) Patrick Rooney (France) Victor Crouin
Manchester Open; Manchester, England; Men : World Tour Silver; 24 players – $76,000 −−−−−− Women : World Tour Silver; 24 players – $76,000	17–21 May	(Egypt) Nour El Tayeb; 11–9, 11–7, 5–11, 11–9 (13th PSA title)	(Belgium) Nele Gilis	(England) Georgina Kennedy (Japan) Satomi Watanabe	(Wales) Tesni Evans (Malaysia) Sivasangari Subramaniam (New Zealand) Joelle King (Wales) Emily Whitlock
Barfoot & Thompson Auckland/Oceania Open; Takapuna, New Zealand; Men : Challenger 5; 24 players – $6,000 −−−−−− Women : Challenger 3; 16 players – $3,000	18–21 May	(Australia) Joseph White; 11–9, 11–7, 3–11, 11–8 (2nd PSA title)	(New Zealand) Temwa Chileshe	(Japan) Tomotaka Endo (New Zealand) Lwamba Chileshe	(New Zealand) Elijah Thomas (New Zealand) Anthony Lepper (Japan) Naoki Hayashi (Hong Kong) To Wai Lok
Barfoot & Thompson Auckland/Oceania Open; Takapuna, New Zealand; Men : Challenger 5; 24 players – $6,000 −−−−−− Women : Challenger 3; 16 players – $3,000	18–21 May	(New Zealand) Lana Harrison; 4–11, 4–11, 11–8, 15–13, 14–12 (2nd PSA title)	(Australia) Alex Haydon	(New Zealand) Abbie Palmer (New Zealand) Sophie Hodges	(New Zealand) Ella Lash (New Zealand) Winona-Jo Joyce (New Zealand) Anabel Romero (New Zealand) Maiden-Lee Coe
PAC Open de Squash; Rio de Janeiro, Brazil; Women : Challenger 5; 16 players – $6,000	18–21 May	(Ukraine) Alina Bushma; 11–9, 11–9, 8–11, 11–6 (1st PSA title)	(Colombia) Lucía Bautista	(Colombia) Laura Tovar (Egypt) Sohaila Ismail	(Scotland) Ellie Jones (Netherlands) Sanne Veldkamp (Netherlands) Tessa ter Sluis (Japan) Erisa Sano
Women's Paraguay Open; Asunción, Paraguay; Men : Challenger 5; 24 players – $6,000	23–27 May	(Colombia) Laura Tovar; 11–7, 12–10, 12–10 (3rd PSA title)	(Colombia) Lucía Bautista	(Egypt) Sohaila Ismail (Colombia) María Tovar	(Ukraine) Nadiya Usenko (Netherlands) Tessa ter Sluis (Japan) Erisa Sano (Mexico) Sarahí López
ECP Open; São Paulo, Brazil; Men : Challenger 5; 24 players – $6,000	24–28 May	(Netherlands) Rowan Damming; 6–11, 11–6, 9–11, 13–11, 12–10 (2nd PSA title)	(Colombia) Andrés Herrera	(Brazil) Pedro Mometto (Brazil) Diego Gobbi	(Brazil) Guilherme Melo (United States) Christopher Gordon (Belgium) Joeri Hapers (Colombia) Edgar Ramírez
Brussels Dronsfields Mercedez Benz; Brussels, Belgium; Women : Challenger 3; 16 players – $3,000	26–28 May	(Colombia) Catalina Peláez; 11–4, 11–7, 8–11, 11–13, 11–9 (1st PSA title)	(England) Kiera Marshall	(France) Léa Barbeau (Spain) Sofía Mateos	(Netherlands) Juliette Permentier (France) Taba Taghavi (Denmark) Klara Møller (France) Ella Gálová
Danny Gamble Open; Canterbury, England; Women : Challenger 3; 16 players – $3,000	26–28 May	(England) Asia Harris; 12–10, 11–6, 13–11 (2nd PSA title)	(Scotland) Alison Thomson	(England) Saran Nghiem (Singapore) Wai Yhann Au Yeong	(England) Katie Wells (Scotland) Katriona Allen (England) Isabel McCullough (England) Amelie Haworth
El Gouna International; El Gouna, Egypt; Men : World Tour Platinum; 48 players – $180,000 ------ Women : World Tour Platinum; 48 players – $180,000	26 May – 2 Jun.	(Egypt) Ali Farag; 12–10, 10–12, 11–6, 11–2 (33rd PSA title)	(Egypt) Mostafa Asal	(England) Mohamed El Shorbagy (Peru) Diego Elías	(New Zealand) Paul Coll (France) Victor Crouin (Egypt) Mazen Hesham (Spain) Iker Pajares
El Gouna International; El Gouna, Egypt; Men : World Tour Platinum; 48 players – $180,000 ------ Women : World Tour Platinum; 48 players – $180,000	26 May – 2 Jun.	(Egypt) Nouran Gohar; 11–5, 11–7, 11–9 (22nd PSA title)	(Belgium) Nele Gilis	(Egypt) Hania El Hammamy (Egypt) Nour El Sherbini	(Egypt) Salma Hany (Belgium) Tinne Gilis (Wales) Tesni Evans (England) Georgina Kennedy
Heroes Austrian Open; Graz, Austria; Men : Challenger 10; 24 players – $12,000	31 May – 4 Jun.	(Japan) Ryūnosuke Tsukue; 11–2, 12–10, 11–4 (7th PSA title)	(Czech Republic) Viktor Byrtus	(England) James Peach (Israel) Daniel Poleshchuk	(Egypt) Mazen Gamal (India) Abhay Singh (England) Simon Herbert (Czech Republic) Martin Švec

=== June ===
Tournament	Date	Champion	Runner-Up	Semifinalists	Quarterfinalists
Kalgoorlie–Boulder Golden Open; Kalgoorlie, Australia; Men : Challenger 3; 16 players – $3,000 −−−−−− Women : WSF & PSA Satellite; 16 players – $1,000	2–4 June	(Sri Lanka) Ravindu Laksiri; 14–12, 5–11, 7–11, 11–8, 11–7 (2nd PSA title)	(Australia) Joseph White	(Australia) Mike Corren (Australia) Nicholas Calvert	(Australia) Oscar Curtis (Australia) Tate Norris (Australia) David Turner (South Korea) Ryu Jeong-min
Kalgoorlie–Boulder Golden Open; Kalgoorlie, Australia; Men : Challenger 3; 16 players – $3,000 −−−−−− Women : WSF & PSA Satellite; 16 players – $1,000	2–4 June	(Australia) Erin Classen; 6–11, 11–5, 11–4, 11–9	(Australia) Sophie Fadaely	(Australia) Hannah Slyth (Australia) Pascale Louka	(Australia) Lisa Christou (Australia) Michaela Pratt (Australia) Clare Slyth (Australia) Fiona Whooley
Open Costa Brava Squash Project; Santa Cristina d'Aro, Spain; Women : Challenger 3; 16 players – $3,000	8–10 June	(England) Saran Nghiem; 11–8, 14–12, 10–12, 6–11, 11–9 (2nd PSA title)	(England) Asia Harris	(Egypt) Hana Ismail (England) Kiera Marshall	(France) Léa Barbeau (England) Katie Wells (Spain) Sofía Mateos (France) Ninon Lemarchand
PSNS President's Trophy; Seri Menanti, Malaysia; Men : Challenger 5; 16 players – $6,000 −−−−−− Women : Challenger 5; 16 players – $6,000	8–11 June	(Malaysia) Ameeshenraj Chandaran; 11–4, 11–5, 12–10 (1st PSA title)	(Egypt) Abdelrahman Abdelkhalek	(Malaysia) Hafiz Zhafri (Malaysia) Ong Sai Hung	(Egypt) Khaled Labib (Malaysia) Darren Rahul Pragasam (Egypt) Mohamed Nasser (Malaysia) Wee Ming Hock
PSNS President's Trophy; Seri Menanti, Malaysia; Men : Challenger 5; 16 players – $6,000 −−−−−− Women : Challenger 5; 16 players – $6,000	8–11 June	(Egypt) Nour Megahed; 12–10, 11–8, 11–9 (1st PSA title)	(Egypt) Habiba Hani	(Malaysia) Sehveetrraa Kumar (India) Rathika Seelan	(Malaysia) Chen Yu Jie (Malaysia) Heng Wai Wong (Egypt) Menna Hamed (Egypt) Nour Ramy
Carey Olsen Tortola Classic; Road Town, British Virgin Islands; Men : Challenger 10; 24 players – $12,000	13–17 June	(United States) Spencer Lovejoy; 11–5, 12–14, 2–11, 11–6, 12–10 (2nd PSA title)	(Pakistan) Asim Khan	(United States) Andrew Douglas (Spain) Bernat Jaume	(Malaysia) Sanjay Jeeva (France) Laszlo Godde (Mexico) Bryan Cueto (Canada) Cory McCartney
J.P. Morgan LBSQUASH Summer Pro; Greenwich, United States; Women : Challenger 5; 24 players – $6,000	13–17 June	(Egypt) Malak Khafagy; 11–4, 11–8, 12–10 (2nd PSA title)	(India) Akanksha Salunkhe	(United States) Caroline Fouts (France) Julia Le Coq	(United States) Madison Ho (Japan) Erisa Sano (United States) Emma Trauber (Egypt) Jana Swaify
WSF World Cup; Chennai, India; Mixed teams : Invitational; 8 teams/4 players each/2 male & 2 female	13–17 June	Final: Egypt 2–1 Malaysia ------------- Kenzy Ayman //4–7, 5–7, 6–7// Yee Xin Ying; Aly Abou Eleinen //7–3, 7–6, 7–4// Darren R Pragasam; Fayrouz Aboelkheir //7–4, 7–5, 6–7, 7–6// Aira Azman		Remaining standings: India & Japan, 3rd Australia, 5th Colombia, 6th South Africa, 7th Hong Kong, 8th	
CIB PSA World Tour Finals; New Cairo, Egypt; Men : World Tour Finals; 8 players – $202,500 – Draw −−−−−− Women : World Tour Finals; 8 players – $202,500 – Draw	20–25 June	(Egypt) Mostafa Asal; 9–11, 11–6, 11–3, 11–5 (3rd PSA Finals title) (12th PSA title)	(Peru) Diego Elías	(England) Mohamed El Shorbagy (Egypt) Ali Farag	Round Robin: (Egypt) Mazen Hesham (New Zealand) Paul Coll (Egypt) Tarek Momen (France) Victor Crouin
CIB PSA World Tour Finals; New Cairo, Egypt; Men : World Tour Finals; 8 players – $202,500 – Draw −−−−−− Women : World Tour Finals; 8 players – $202,500 – Draw	20–25 June	(Egypt) Nouran Gohar; 10–11, 11–9, 9–11, 11–6, 12–10 (2nd PSA Finals title) (23rd PSA title)	(Egypt) Hania El Hammamy	(Egypt) Nour El Sherbini (Egypt) Nour El Tayeb	Round Robin: (England) Georgina Kennedy (New Zealand) Joelle King (Belgium) Nele Gilis (United States) Olivia Fiechter
HSC Open; Houston, United States; Men : Challenger 10; 24 players – $12,000	21–25 June	(Spain) Bernat Jaume; 11–5, 11–7, 10–12, 11–8 (6th PSA title)	(Egypt) Kareem El Torkey	(Pakistan) Asim Khan (Guatemala) Alejandro Enríquez	(United States) Christopher Gordon (Mexico) Alejandro Reyes (Pakistan) Ahsan Ayaz (Pakistan) Ashab Irfan
Champion Fiberglass Open; Houston, United States; Women : Challenger 10; 24 players – $12,000	21–25 June	(Egypt) Kenzy Ayman; 11–8, 11–9, 7–11, 12–10 (4th PSA title)	(United States) Marina Stefanoni	(Egypt) Menna Hamed (Egypt) Malak Khafagy	(Egypt) Ingy Hammouda (India) Akanksha Salunkhe (United States) Caroline Fouts (Wales) Lowri Roberts
Harcourts KDRE Morrinsville Open; Morrinsville, New Zealand; Men : Challenger 5; 16 players – $6,000	22–25 June	(Netherlands) Rowan Damming; 11–7, 11–4, 11–5 (3rd PSA title)	(New Zealand) Lwamba Chileshe	(New Zealand) Anthony Lepper (New Zealand) Temwa Chileshe	(New Zealand) Mason Smales (New Zealand) Willz Donnelly (New Zealand) Joel Arscott (New Zealand) Elijah Thomas
Maspeth Squash Open; New York City, United States; Men : Challenger 5; 16 players – $6,000	22–25 June	(Austria) Aqeel Rehman; 11–8, 11–7, 11–9 (13th PSA title)	(England) Tom Walsh	(Egypt) Mohamed Nabil (Canada) Liam Marrison	(Brazil) Vinícius Rodrigues (India) Abhishek Agarwal (Canada) Brett Schille (Mexico) Leo Vargas
Gibraltar Open; Gibraltar; Men : Challenger 5; 16 players – $6,000 −−−−−− Women : Challenger 5; 16 players – $6,000	28 Jun. – 1 Jul.	(India) Velavan Senthilkumar; 18–16, 11–8, 11–7 (6th PSA title)	(Spain) Iván Pérez	(Czech Republic) Daniel Mekbib (Wales) Emyr Evans	(England) Miles Jenkins (Wales) Owain Taylor (England) James Peach (Spain) Edmon López
Gibraltar Open; Gibraltar; Men : Challenger 5; 16 players – $6,000 −−−−−− Women : Challenger 5; 16 players – $6,000	28 Jun. – 1 Jul.	(Spain) Marta Domínguez; 11–8, 11–7, 11–7 (3rd PSA title)	(Egypt) Hana Ismail	(Austria) Jacqueline Peychär (England) Saran Nghiem	(France) Lauren Baltayan (England) Kiera Marshall (Singapore) Wai Yhann Au Yeong (Scotland) Katriona Allen
City of Greater Bendigo International; Bendigo, Australia; Men : Challenger 3; 16 players – $3,000 −−−−−− Women : Challenger 3; 16 players – $3,000	29 Jun. – 2 Jul.	(Netherlands) Rowan Damming; 11–6, 11–9, 11–7 (4th PSA title)	(Australia) Dylan Molinaro	(Australia) Nicholas Calvert (Malaysia) Bryan Lim Tze Kang	(France) Brice Nicolas (Denmark) Theis Houlberg (Australia) James Lloyd (Malaysia) Amir Amirul
City of Greater Bendigo International; Bendigo, Australia; Men : Challenger 3; 16 players – $3,000 −−−−−− Women : Challenger 3; 16 players – $3,000	29 Jun. – 2 Jul.	(South Korea) Song Dong-ju; 11–8, 11–9, 14–12 (1st PSA title)	(South Korea) Choe Yu-ra	(Malta) Colette Sultana (South Korea) Heo Min-gyeong	(India) Urwashi Joshi (Australia) Sophie Fadaely (Pakistan) Riffat Khan (Pakistan) Noor-ul-Huda

=== July ===
Tournament	Date	Champion	Runner-Up	Semifinalists	Quarterfinalists
STT Petróleos Open; Mexico City, Mexico; Men : Challenger 10; 24 players – $12,000	5–9 July	(Mexico) Leonel Cárdenas; 12–12^{rtd.} (14th PSA title)	(Mexico) Alfredo Ávila	(Egypt) Ibrahim Elkabbani (Mexico) Jorge Gómez	(Mexico) Alejandro Reyes (Guatemala) Alejandro Enríquez (Guatemala) Josué Enríquez (Mexico) Leo Vargas
Berkhamsted Linksap Open; Berkhamsted, England; Men : Challenger 5; 16 players – $6,000 −−−−−− Women : Challenger 5; 16 players – $6,000	6–9 July	(England) Ben Coleman; 11–4, 13–11, 11–6 (11th PSA title)	(England) James Peach	(Wales) Emyr Evans (England) Perry Malik	(Wales) Elliott Morris Devred (India) Velavan Senthilkumar (England) Miles Jenkins (Austria) Aqeel Rehman
Berkhamsted Linksap Open; Berkhamsted, England; Men : Challenger 5; 16 players – $6,000 −−−−−− Women : Challenger 5; 16 players – $6,000	6–9 July	(England) Saran Nghiem; 13–11, 11–8, 11–8 (3rd PSA title)	(England) Torrie Malik	(Egypt) Nour Heikal (England) Alicia Mead	(Egypt) Hana Ismail (Wales) Ali Loke (England) Emma Bartley (Slovenia) Nika Urh
City of Greater Shepparton International; Shepparton, Australia; Men : Challenger 3; 16 players – $3,000 −−−−−− Women : Challenger 3; 16 players – $3,000	6–9 July	(New Zealand) Temwa Chileshe; 12–10, 11–6, 12–10 (1st PSA title)	(Netherlands) Rowan Damming	(Sri Lanka) Ravindu Laksiri (France) Laouenan Loaëc	(Australia) Benjamin Ratcliffe (Denmark) Theis Houlberg (New Zealand) Joel Arscott (France) Brice Nicolas
City of Greater Shepparton International; Shepparton, Australia; Men : Challenger 3; 16 players – $3,000 −−−−−− Women : Challenger 3; 16 players – $3,000	6–9 July	(Malaysia) Yasshmita Jadishkumar; 11–7, 11–6, 4–11, 11–6 (1st PSA title)	(South Korea) Heo Min-gyeong	(Japan) Risa Sugimoto (Australia) Lee Sze Yu	(South Korea) Choe Yu-ra (Australia) Erin Classen (India) Urwashi Joshi (Australia) Courtney Scholtz
Victorian Open; Wheelers Hill, Australia; Men : Challenger 5; 24 players – $6,000 ------ Women : Challenger 5; 24 players – $6,000	12–16 July	(Australia) Rex Hedrick; 10–12, 11–9, 8–11, 11–1, 11–9 (21st PSA title)	(Netherlands) Rowan Damming	(New Zealand) Temwa Chileshe (France) Baptiste Bouin	(Sri Lanka) Ravindu Laksiri (Australia) Rhys Dowling (Australia) Nicholas Calvert (New Zealand) Lwamba Chileshe
Victorian Open; Wheelers Hill, Australia; Men : Challenger 5; 24 players – $6,000 ------ Women : Challenger 5; 24 players – $6,000	12–16 July	(Malaysia) Yasshmita Jadishkumar; 11–7, 11–9, 5–11, 5–11, 11–9 (2nd PSA title)	(South Korea) Heo Min-gyeong	(Hong Kong) Wai Sze Wing (Japan) Risa Sugimoto	(India) Urwashi Joshi (Hong Kong) Toby Tse (Malta) Colette Sultana (Australia) Remashree Muniandy
Life Time Johns Creek Open; Johns Creek, United States; Men : Challenger 10; 24 players – $12,000	19–23 July	(Egypt) Ibrahim Elkabbani; 11–5, 9–11, 11–6, 13–11 (4th PSA title)	(Pakistan) Noor Zaman	(Pakistan) Ashab Irfan (Mexico) Alejandro Reyes	(Pakistan) Asim Khan (Argentina) Jeremías Azaña (Canada) Brett Schille (Canada) Liam Marrison
Bremer Schlüssel; Achim, Germany; Men : Challenger 10; 24 players – $12,000	26–30 July	(England) Simon Herbert; 11–9, 11–3, 11–5 (4th PSA title)	(Egypt) Mazen Gamal	(Egypt) Yassin ElShafei (India) Mahesh Mangaonkar	(England) James Peach (Switzerland) Yannick Wilhelmi (Czech Republic) Viktor Byrtus (Israel) Daniel Poleshchuk
Eastside Open; Bellerive, Australia; Men : Challenger 5; 32 players – $6,000	26–30 July	(Scotland) Alasdair Prott; 8–11, 11–5, 8–11, 11–3, 11–6 (1st PSA title)	(Australia) Dylan Molinaro	(Hong Kong) Ho Ka Hei (Australia) Rhys Dowling	(Malaysia) Bryan Lim Tze Kang (France) Paul Gonzalez (Hong Kong) Lam Shing Fung (New Zealand) Elijah Thomas
Life Time Colleyville Open; Colleyville, United States; Men : Challenger 3; 16 players – $3,000	27–30 July	(Colombia) Matías Knudsen w/o (1st PSA title)	(Canada) Syan Singh	(Bermuda) Taylor Carrick (Mexico) Sebastián Salazar	(Pakistan) Abdul Malik Khan (Pakistan) Saeed Abdul (Egypt) Mahmoud Abouelleil (Egypt) Ziad Sakr

== Statistical information ==
The players/nations are sorted by:

1. Total number of titles;
2. Cumulated importance of those titles;
3. Alphabetical order (by family names for players).

=== Key ===
World Championship
World Tour Platinum
World Tour Gold
World Tour Silver
World Tour Bronze
Challenger Tour 5/10/20/30

=== Titles won by player (men's) ===
Total	Player	World Ch. / PSA Finals	Platinum	Gold	Silver	Bronze	Challenger 30	Challenger 20	Challenger 10	Challenger 5	Challenger 3
5	Ali Farag (EGY)	●	●●●		●						
5	Mohamed El Shorbagy (ENG)		●	●●	●●						
5	Abhay Singh (IND)								●●●	●	●
5	Alfredo Ávila (MEX)								●	●●●●	
4	Mostafa Asal (EGY)	●	●	●●							
4	Diego Elías (PER)		●●		●●						
4	Rowan Damming (NED)									●●●	●
3	Victor Crouin (FRA)					●●	●				
3	Leandro Romiglio (ARG)								●●●		
3	Rory Stewart (SCO)								●●●		
3	Yassin ElShafei (EGY)								●	●●	
3	Ben Smith (ENG)									●●●	
3	Velavan Senthilkumar (IND)									●●	●
2	Eain Yow (MYS)						●	●			
2	Auguste Dussourd (FRA)							●	●		
2	Aly Abou Eleinen (EGY)							●	●		
2	Abdullah Al-Muzayen (KUW)								●●		
2	David Baillargeon (CAN)								●●		
2	Timothy Brownell (USA)								●●		
2	Leonel Cárdenas (MEX)								●●		
2	Alex Lau (HKG)								●●		
2	Charlie Lee (ENG)								●●		
2	Sam Todd (ENG)								●●		
2	Ryūnosuke Tsukue (JPN)								●●		
2	Ibrahim Elkabbani (EGY)								●	●	
2	Rex Hedrick (AUS)								●	●	
2	Simon Herbert (ENG)								●	●	
2	Edwin Clain (FRA)									●	●
2	Ravindu Laksiri (SRI)									●	●
2	Alejandro Reyes (MEX)									●	●
2	Finnlay Withington (ENG)										●●
1	Paul Coll (NZL)			●							
1	Karim Abdel Gawad (EGY)			●							
1	Marwan El Shorbagy (EGY)					●					
1	Mazen Hesham (EGY)					●					
1	Joel Makin (WAL)					●					
1	Youssef Soliman (EGY)					●					
1	Moustafa El Sirty (EGY)						●				
1	Nicolas Müller (SUI)						●				
1	Miguel Á Rodríguez (COL)						●				
1	Borja Golán (ESP)							●			
1	Nathan Lake (ENG)							●			
1	Adrian Waller (ENG)							●			
1	Balázs Farkas (HUN)								●		
1	Nasir Iqbal (PAK)								●		
1	Bernat Jaume (ESP)								●		
1	Spencer Lovejoy (USA)								●		
1	Curtis Malik (ENG)								●		
1	Zahed Salem (EGY)								●		
1	César Salazar (MEX)								●		
1	Yannick Wilhelmi (SUI)								●		
1	Jeremías Azaña (ARG)									●	
1	Viktor Byrtus (CZE)									●	
1	Ameeshenraj Chandaran (MYS)									●	
1	Ben Coleman (ENG)									●	
1	Josué Enríquez (GUA)									●	
1	Emyr Evans (WAL)									●	
1	Robin Gadola (SUI)									●	
1	Tang Ming Hong (HKG)									●	
1	Marek Panáček (CZE)									●	
1	Iván Pérez (ESP)									●	
1	Alasdair Prott (SCO)									●	
1	Aqeel Rehman (AUT)									●	
1	Nick Sachvie (CAN)									●	
1	Seif Shenawy (EGY)									●	
1	Jakub Solnický (CZE)									●	
1	Marwan Tarek (EGY)									●	
1	Dewald van Niekerk (RSA)									●	
1	Joseph White (AUS)									●	
1	Miko Äijänen (FIN)										●
1	Temwa Chileshe (NZL)										●
1	Elliott Morris Devred (WAL)										●
1	Matías Knudsen (COL)										●
1	Robertino Pezzota (ARG)										●
1	Owain Taylor (WAL)										●
1	Leo Vargas (MEX)										●

=== Titles won by nation (men's) ===
Total	Nation	World Ch. / PSA Finals	Platinum	Gold	Silver	Bronze	Challenger 30	Challenger 20	Challenger 10	Challenger 5	Challenger 3
24	Egypt (EGY)	●●	●●●●	●●●	●	●●●	●	●	●●●●	●●●●●	
20	England (ENG)		●	●●	●●			●●	●●●●●●	●●●●●	●●
11	Mexico (MEX)								●●●●	●●●●●	●●
8	India (IND)								●●●	●●●	●●
7	France (FRA)					●●	●	●	●	●	●
5	Argentina (ARG)								●●●	●	●
4	Peru (PER)		●●		●●						
4	Wales (WAL)					●				●	●●
4	Scotland (SCO)								●●●	●	
4	Netherlands (NED)									●●●	●
3	Malaysia (MYS)						●	●		●	
3	Switzerland (SUI)						●		●	●	
3	Spain (ESP)							●	●	●	
3	United States (USA)								●●●		
3	Canada (CAN)								●●	●	
3	Hong Kong (HKG)								●●	●	
3	Australia (AUS)								●	●●	
3	Czech Republic (CZE)									●●●	
2	New Zealand (NZL)			●							●
2	Colombia (COL)						●				●
2	Japan (JPN)								●●		
2	Kuwait (KUW)								●●		
2	Sri Lanka (SRI)									●	●
1	Hungary (HUN)								●		
1	Pakistan (PAK)								●		
1	Austria (AUT)									●	
1	Guatemala (GUA)									●	
1	South Africa (RSA)									●	
1	Finland (FIN)										●

=== Titles won by player (women's) ===
Total	Player	World Ch. / PSA Finals	Platinum	Gold	Silver	Bronze	Challenger 30	Challenger 20	Challenger 10	Challenger 5	Challenger 3
6	Nouran Gohar (EGY)	●	●●	●●	●						
6	Torrie Malik (ENG)									●●●	●●●
4	Nour El Sherbini (EGY)	●	●●	●							
3	Nele Gilis (BEL)					●●	●				
3	Hana Moataz (EGY)							●	●●		
3	Chan Sin Yuk (HKG)							●	●●		
3	Kenzy Ayman (EGY)								●●●		
3	Diana García (MEX)								●	●●	
3	Amina Orfi (EGY)								●	●●	
2	Hania El Hammamy (EGY)		●●								
2	Joelle King (NZL)			●	●						
2	Nour El Tayeb (EGY)				●	●					
2	Olivia Fiechter (USA)				●	●					
2	Georgina Kennedy (ENG)				●	●					
2	Amanda Sobhy (USA)				●	●					
2	Tinne Gilis (BEL)					●	●				
2	Haya Ali (EGY)								●	●	
2	Ainaa Amani (MYS)								●	●	
2	Menna Hamed (EGY)								●	●	
2	Malak Khafagy (EGY)								●	●	
2	Wen Li Lai (MYS)									●●	
2	Laura Tovar (COL)									●●	
2	Yasshmita Jadishkumar (MYS)									●	●
2	Saran Nghiem (ENG)									●	●
2	Asia Harris (ENG)										●●
1	Satomi Watanabe (JPN)						●				
1	Mélissa Alves (FRA)							●			
1	Jasmine Hutton (ENG)							●			
1	Farida Mohamed (EGY)							●			
1	Lucy Turmel (ENG)							●			
1	Zeina Zein (EGY)							●			
1	Fayrouz Aboelkheir (EGY)								●		
1	Aira Azman (MYS)								●		
1	Lucía Bautista (COL)								●		
1	Salma El Tayeb (EGY)								●		
1	Tong Tsz Wing (HKG)								●		
1	Lauren Baltayan (FRA)									●	
1	Alina Bushma (UKR)									●	
1	Marta Domínguez (ESP)									●	
1	Nardine Garas (EGY)									●	
1	Katie Malliff (ENG)									●	
1	Nour Megahed (EGY)									●	
1	Cheng Nga Ching (HKG)									●	
1	Marina Stefanoni (USA)									●	
1	Emily Whitlock (WAL)									●	
1	Cheyna Wood (RSA)									●	
1	Ambre Allinckx (SUI)										●
1	Heylie Fung (HKG)										●
1	Lana Harrison (NZL)										●
1	Klara Møller (DEN)										●
1	Song Dong-ju (KOR)										●
1	Catalina Peláez (COL)										●
1	Lowri Roberts (WAL)										●
1	Alison Thomson (SCO)										●
1	Katerina Týcová (GER)										●
1	Yee Xin Ying (MYS)										●

=== Titles won by nation (women's) ===
Total	Nation	World Ch. / PSA Finals	Platinum	Gold	Silver	Bronze	Challenger 30	Challenger 20	Challenger 10	Challenger 5	Challenger 3
35	Egypt (EGY)	●●	●●●●●●	●●●	●●	●		●●●	●●●●●●●●●●●	●●●●●●●	
15	England (ENG)				●	●		●●		●●●●●	●●●●●●
8	Malaysia (MYS)								●●	●●●●	●●
6	Hong Kong (HKG)							●	●●●	●	●
5	United States (USA)				●●	●●				●	
5	Belgium (BEL)					●●●	●●				
4	Colombia (COL)								●	●●	●
3	New Zealand (NZL)			●	●						●
3	Mexico (MEX)								●	●●	
2	France (FRA)							●		●	
2	Wales (WAL)									●	●
1	Japan (JPN)						●				
1	South Africa (RSA)									●	
1	Spain (ESP)									●	
1	Ukraine (UKR)									●	
1	Denmark (DEN)										●
1	Germany (GER)										●
1	Scotland (SCO)										●
1	South Korea (KOR)										●
1	Switzerland (SUI)										●

== Retirements ==
Following is a list of notable players (winners of a main tour title, and/or part of the PSA Men's World Rankings and Women's World Rankings top 30 for at least one month) who announced their retirement from professional squash, became inactive, or were permanently banned from playing, during the 2022–23 season:

- Daryl Selby
- Mathieu Castagnet
- Donna Lobban
- Yip Tsz Fung
- Alan Clyne
- Rachael Grinham
- Julianne Courtice

== Current world top 10 players ==
=== Men's world ranking ===
PSA Men's World Rankings as of 1 September 2025
Rank	Player	Points	Move^{†}
1	Mostafa Asal (EGY)	2,338	Steady
2	Diego Elías (PER)	1,631	Steady
3	Paul Coll (NZL)	1,153	Steady
4	Joel Makin (WAL)	1,096	Steady
5	Marwan Elshorbagy (ENG)	847	Steady
6	Karim Gawad (EGY)	811	Steady
7	Mohamed Elshorbagy (ENG)	794	Steady
8	Youssef Soliman (EGY)	616	Steady
9	Aly Abou Eleinen (EGY)	580	Steady
10	Youssef Ibrahim (EGY)	578	Steady

=== Women's world ranking ===
PSA Women's World Rankings, of the 5 January 2026
Rank	Player	Average	Move^{†}
1	Hania El Hammamy (EGY)	1,791	Steady
2	Nouran Gohar (EGY)	1,578	Steady
3	Amina Orfi (EGY)	1,455	Steady
4	Nour El Sherbini (EGY)	1,324	Steady
5	Olivia Weaver (USA)	1,284	Steady
6	Satomi Watanabe (JPN)	881	Steady
7	Sivasangari Subramaniam (MAS)	869	Steady
8	Tinne Gilis (BEL)	755	Steady
9	Fayrouz Aboelkheir (EGY)	753	Steady
10	Georgina Kennedy (ENG)	741	Steady

== See also ==
- 2022–23 PSA World Tour Finals
- 2023 Men's PSA World Tour Finals
- 2023 Women's PSA World Tour Finals
- 2023 in squash
