= HCL-SRFI India Tour =

Indian squash tour

Details
- Event name: HCL-SRFI India Tour
- Dates: September

HCL-SRFI India Tour is a Professional Squash Association multi-city circuit organised in India by HCL and Squash Racquets Federation of India to promote Squash as a sport in the country. The tournament features leading players from Canada, Egypt, France, India, Japan, Russia, Spain and the United States.

== History ==
HCL-SRFI India Tour tournament has been organised from 2019 by HCL and Squash Racquets Federation of India to promote squash in the country. Many national and International players compete in the tournament.

== Prize money ==
HCL-SRFI India Tour Tournament has prize money of $12K for men and women.

== Winners ==
Year 2022- Abhay Singh from India and Kenzy Ayman from Egypt were men and women winners respectively during the first leg of 2022 HCL-SRFI Indian Tour, held in Chennai from September 19 – 23, 2022.

Year 2021 - Velavan Senthilkumar from India and Tanvi Khanna from India were men and women winners respectively during the 2021 HCL-SRFI Indian Tour, held in Chennai from August 23–26.

== See also ==
- 2022–23 PSA World Tour
