= Ella Gálová =

French squash player (born 2004)

Personal information
- Born: 25 February 2004 (age 22) Bratislava, Slovakia
- Education: Harvard
- Height: 1.60 m (5 ft 3 in)
- Weight: 50 kg (110 lb)

Sport
- Country: Slovakia/France
- Handedness: right-handed
- League: Ivy League
- Team: Harvard Women's Squash
- Turned pro: 2021
- Retired: Active
- Racquet used: Technifibre

women's singles
- Highest ranking: 135 (February 2022)
- Current ranking: 135 (February 2022)
- Updated on February 2022

Ella Gálová (born 25 February 2004) is a French-Slovak professional squash player. She achieved her highest career PSA ranking of 135 in February 2022 during the 2021-22 PSA World Tour.
