= Hafiz Zhafri =

Malaysian squash player (born 2001)

Personal information
- Born: April 3, 2001 (age 25) Alor Setar, Malaysia

Sport
- Country: Malaysia
- Handedness: Left handed
- Turned pro: 2017
- Retired: Active
- Racquet used: Dunlop

Men's singles
- Highest ranking: No. 233 (July 2022)
- Current ranking: No. 233 (July 2022)
- Updated on July 2022

Hafiz Zhafri (born 3 April 2001 in Alor Setar) is a Malaysian professional squash player. As of July 2022, he was ranked number 233 in the world. He won the 2022 Shepparton International.
