= Asia Harris =

English squash player (born 2004)

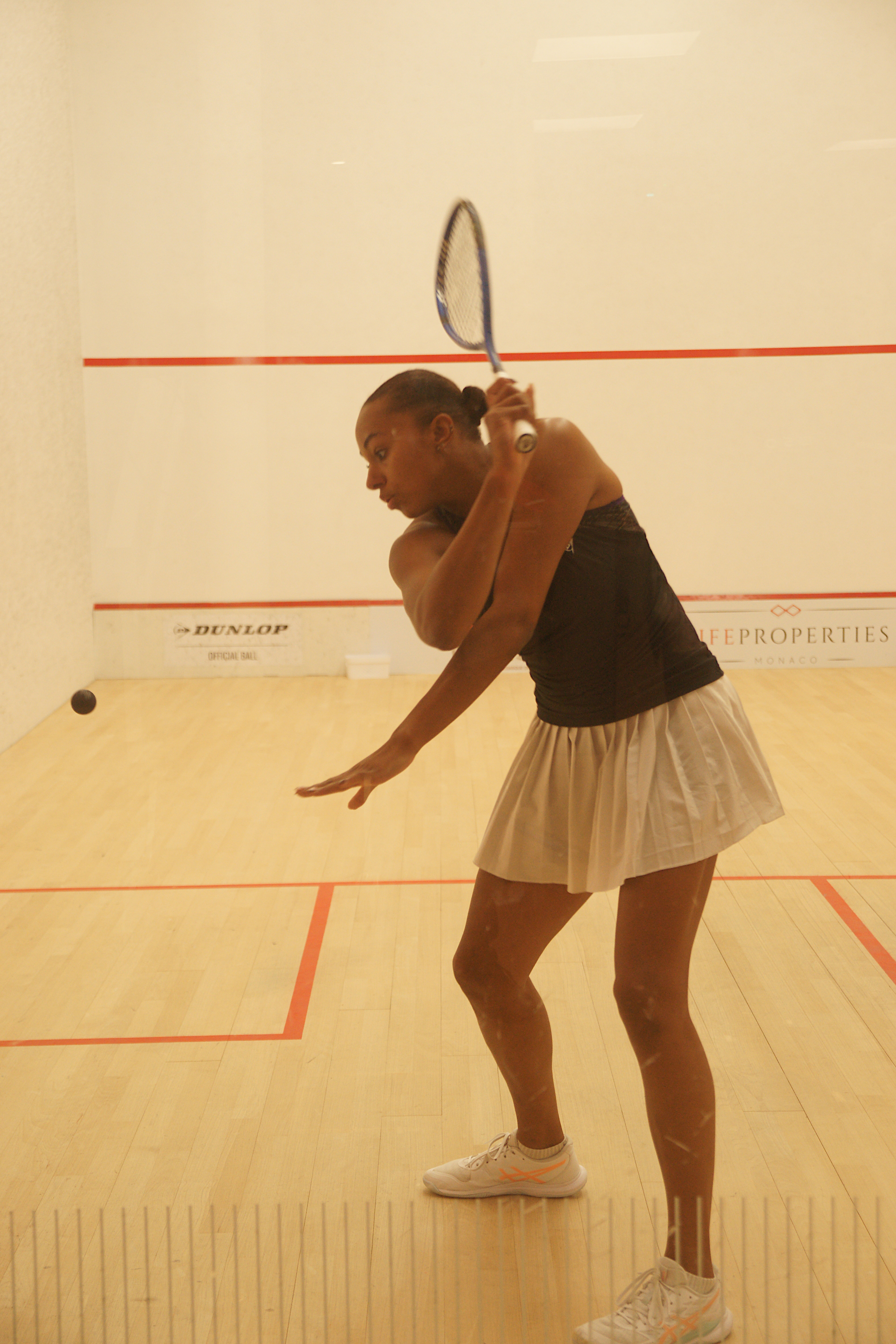

Personal information
- Born: 22 December 2004 (age 21) Pontefract, England

Sport
- Country: England
- Turned pro: 2020
- Retired: Active
- Racquet used: Dunlop

Women's singles
- Highest ranking: No. 68 (January 2024)
- Current ranking: No. 101 (October 2025)
- Title: 5

Asia Harris (born 22 December 2004) is an English professional squash player. She is coached by Nick Matthew. She reached a career high ranking of 68 in the world during January 2024.

== Career ==
She won the 2022 Mirabelles International.

Harris reached the final of the Springfield Scottish Squash Open in September 2023. and played in the Premier Squash League for St George's Hill.

In March 2024 she lost a narrow five-game match to Alicia Mead at the Optasia Championships in London.

In September 2025, she won her 4th PSA title after securing victory in the Stourbridge Open during the 2025–26 PSA Squash Tour. Shortly afterwards Harris won a 5th title, securing victory in the Lausanne Open.

== See also ==
- PSA World Tour
