= Ibrahim Elkabbani =

Egyptian squash player (born 2002)

Personal information
- Nationality: Egyptian
- Born: 26 August 2002 (age 23) Giza, Egypt
- Height: 185 cm (6 ft 1 in)
- Weight: 79 kg (174 lb)

Sport
- Turned pro: 2019
- Coached by: Ahmed Abdelkhalek
- Retired: Active
- Racquet used: Head

Men's singles
- Highest ranking: No. 58 (July 2024)
- Current ranking: No. 102 (April 2026)
- Title: 8
Medal record
squash
Representing Egypt
World Cup
Bronze medal – third place	2025 Chennai	Team

Ibrahim Elkabbani (born 26 August 2002) is an Egyptian professional squash player. He reached a career high ranking of 58 in the world during February 2026.

== Biography ==
As a professional, he won the 2020 Jaipur tournament.

In March 2026, he won his 8th PSA title after securing victory in the ESF Open during the 2025–26 PSA Squash Tour.
