= Elliott Morris Devred =

Welsh squash player (born 1998)

Personal information
- Nationality: British (Welsh)
- Born: 11 May 1998 (age 28) Birmingham, England

Sport
- Racquet used: Unsquashable

men's singles
- Highest ranking: 120 (March 2023)
- Current ranking: 227 (April 2026)
- Title: 4

Elliott Morris Devred (born 11 May 1998) is an English born, Welsh male squash player. He reached a career high ranking of 120 in the world during March 2023.

== Biography ==
Morris Devred won the 2019 Internazionali d'Italia professional tournament.

In March 2026, he won his third and fourth PSA titles in quick succession after securing victory in the Inventist Open Challenger and Northumbria Open during the 2025–26 PSA Squash Tour.
