= Klara Møller =

Danish squash player (born 2001)

Personal information
- Born: 2 July 2001 (age 25) Hurup, Denmark

Sport
- Country: Denmark
- Turned pro: 2021
- Retired: Active

Women's singles
- Highest ranking: No. 111 (August 2022)
- Current ranking: No. 116 (November 2022)
- Updated on November 2022

Klara Møller (born 2 July 2001 in Hurup) is a Danish professional squash player. As of November 2022, she was ranked number 116 in the world. She won the 2023 Open International d'Angers.
