= Leo Vargas =

Mexican squash player (born 2001)

Personal information
- Born: 2001 (age 24–25) Pachuca, Mexico

Sport
- Country: Mexico
- Turned pro: 2019
- Retired: Active
- Racquet used: Tecnifibre

Men's singles
- Highest ranking: No. 171 (December 2022)
- Current ranking: No. 171 (December 2022)
- Updated on December 2022

Leo Vargas (born in 2001 in Pachuca) is a Mexican professional squash player. As of December 2022, he was ranked number 171 in the world. He won the 2022 Anivesario cup.
