= Élise Romba =

French professional squash player (born 1997)

Elise Romba
Personal information
- Born: 11 July 1997 (age 29) Villefontaine, France

Sport
- Country: France
- Retired: Active
- Racquet used: Dunlop

Women's singles
- Highest ranking: No. 89 (June 2024)
- Current ranking: No. 101 (February 2025)
- Updated on February 2025

Elise Romba (born 11 July 1997 in Villefontaine) is a French professional squash player. As of February 2025, she was ranked number 101 in the world.
