= Temwa Chileshe =

New Zealand squash player (born 2000)

Personal information
- Born: 2 August 2000 (age 26) Christchurch, New Zealand

Sport
- Country: New Zealand
- Turned pro: 2019
- Retired: Active
- Racquet used: Unsquashable

Men's singles
- Highest ranking: No. 99 (July 2024)
- Current ranking: No. 114 (July 2023)
- Updated on July 2023

Temwa Chileshe (born 2 August 2000 in Christchurch) is a New Zealand professional squash player. As of July 2023, he was ranked number 114 in the world. He won the 2023 Shepparton International tournament of the world tour.
