= Lewis Doughty =

English squash player (born 1990)

Personal information
- Born: 24 December 1990 (age 35) Manchester, England

Sport
- Country: England

men's singles
- Highest ranking: 214 (September 2015)
- Current ranking: 169 (April 2022)

Lewis Doughty (born 24 December 1990) is an English male professional squash player. He achieved his highest career ranking of 214 in September 2015 during the 2015 PSA World Tour.
