= Alasdair Prott =

Scottish squash player (born 2001)

Personal information
- Born: 28 June 2001 (age 25) Inverness, Scotland

Sport
- Country: Scotland
- Handedness: Right handed
- Turned pro: 2018
- Retired: Active
- Racquet used: Dunlop

Men's singles
- Highest ranking: No. 143 (June 2023)
- Current ranking: No. 145 (July 2023)
- Updated on July 2023

Alasdair Prott (born 28 June 2001 in Inverness) is a Scottish professional squash player. As of July 2023, he was ranked number 145 in the world. He won the 2023 Eastside Open.
