= Anna Kimberley =

English squash player (born 1995)

Personal information
- Born: 11 March 1995 (age 31) Ipswich, England

Sport
- Country: England

women's singles
- Highest ranking: 68 (2022)
- Current ranking: 68 (2022)

Anna Kimberley (born 11 March 1995) was an English female professional squash player. She reached her highest career ranking of 68 in 2022.
