= Rowan Damming =

Dutch squash player (born 2004)

Personal information
- Nationality: Dutch
- Born: 5 September 2004 (age 22) 's-Hertogenbosch, Netherlands

Sport
- Turned pro: 2019
- Retired: Active
- Racquet used: Dunlop

Men's singles
- Highest ranking: No. 76 (June 2025)
- Current ranking: No. 74 (April 2026)
- Title: 13

Rowan Damming (born 5 September 2004) is a Dutch professional squash player. He reached a career high ranking of 74 in the world during April 2026.

== Biography ==
By July 2023, he had won four professional tournaments.

In June 2025, he won his 6th and 7th PSA titles in quick succession in New Zealand, after securing victory in the South Island Open and Midlands PSA during the 2024–25 PSA Squash Tour. An eighth title followed in October 2025, after securing victory in the Swiss Open during the 2025–26 PSA Squash Tour.

In November 2025 Damming received a 16-week suspension and was fined £1,000 by the Professional Squash Association for breaches of the PSA Code of Conduct during his quarter-final match at the Japan Open relating to "Visible Obscenity; Abuse of Racket, Equipment or Court; Leaving Court; Audible Obscenity; Unsportsmanlike Conduct; Verbal Abuse; and Aggravated Behaviour". Half of the suspension and fine were suspended, to be reapplied upon any reoffence over the next 52 weeks.

Damming won five PSA titles during the 2025–26 PSA Squash Tour. They were the Swiss Open, Amsterdam Challenger, Poznań Open, Filip Krüeger Open and Rotterdam Open, which propelled him to his best ever world ranking of 74 in April 2026.
