= Ninon Lemarchand =

French squash player (born 2003)

Personal information
- Born: 20 May 2003 (age 23) Nantes, Saint Etienne
- Height: 1.68 m (5 ft 6 in)
- Weight: 58 kg (128 lb)

Sport
- Country: France
- Turned pro: 2019
- Retired: Active
- Racquet used: Technifibre

women's singles
- Highest ranking: 171 (May 2021)
- Current ranking: 171 (May 2021)
- Updated on 30 May 2021

Ninon Lemarchand (born 20 May 2003) is a French professional squash player. She competed at the 2019 Women's World Junior Squash Championships. She achieved her highest career PSA ranking of 171 in May 2021 during the 2020-21 PSA World Tour.
