= Alejandro Reyes (squash player) =

Mexican squash player (born 1996)

Personal information
- Born: August 7, 1996 (age 29) Puebla, Mexico

Sport
- Country: Mexico
- Turned pro: 2018
- Retired: Active
- Racquet used: Harrow

Men's singles
- Highest ranking: No. 102 (september 2023)
- Current ranking: No. 107 (September 2023)
- Updated on September 2023

Alejandro Reyes (born 7 August 1996 in Puebla) is a Mexican professional squash player. As of September 2022, he was ranked number 154 in the world. He has won 2 PSA tournaments.
