= Taba Taghavi =

French-Iranian squash player (born 1992)

Personal information
- Born: 23 April 1992 (age 34) Reims, France
- Height: 1.60 m (5 ft 3 in)
- Weight: 56 kg (123 lb)

Sport
- Country: Iran/France
- Handedness: right-handed
- Turned pro: 2007
- Retired: Active
- Racquet used: Salming

women's singles
- Highest ranking: 106 (February 2017)
- Current ranking: 125 (May 2021)
- Updated on 30 May 2021

Taba Taghavi Rafsanjani also simply known as Taba Taghavi (born 23 April 1992) is a French-Iranian professional squash player. She competed at the 2017 Women's Asian Individual Squash Championships representing Iran. She achieved her highest career PSA ranking of 120 in February 2017 during the 2016–17 PSA World Tour.
