= James Peach =

English squash player (born 1997)

Personal information
- Born: 14 June 1997 (age 29) Doncaster, England

Sport
- Country: England
- Turned pro: 2013
- Retired: Active
- Racquet used: Karakal

Men's singles
- Highest ranking: No. 191 (January 2020)
- Current ranking: No. 269 (November 2021)
- Title: 2
- Updated on November 2021

James Peach (born 14 June 1997 in Doncaster) is an English professional squash player. As of November 2021, he was ranked number 269 in the world. He has won 2 PSA titles.
