= Fayrouz Aboelkheir =

Egyptian squash player (born 2006)

Personal information
- Born: 4 March 2006 (age 20)

Sport
- Country: Egyptian
- Retired: Active
- Racquet used: Opfeel

Women's singles
- Highest ranking: No. 9 (December 2025)
- Current ranking: No. 9 (December 2025)
- Title: 7

Fayrouz Aboelkheir (born 4 March 2006) is an Egyptian squash player. She reached a career high ranking of number 9 in the world during December 2025.

== Career ==
In 2021, Aboelkheir won the Egyptian Challenger Tour #1 professional tournament.

In September 2024, Aboelkheir won her 4th PSA title after securing victory in the Carol Weymuller Open during the 2024–25 PSA Squash Tour She followed this up by winning a 5th, 6th and 7th titles in October and November respectively, winning the New York Open Squash Classic, Chestnut Hill Classic and the HKFC Open, during the 2025–26 PSA Squash Tour.
