= Akanksha Salunkhe =

Indian professional squash player (born 1999)

Personal information
- Born: 24 January 1999 (age 27) Satara, India

Sport
- Country: India
- Turned pro: 2016
- Racquet used: Tecnifibre

Women's singles
- Highest ranking: 62 (February 2025)
- Current ranking: 69 (March 2025)
- Title: 5
- Tour final: 10
- PSA Profile

Akanksha Salunkhe (born 24 January 1999) is an Indian squash player. Salunkhe reached a career high ranking of 62nd in the world as of February 2025.

== Career ==
In 2022, she was India's number one women's player and won the 2022 Guatemala Open.

In 2024, Salunkhe won her 3rd PSA title after securing victory in the Open de Couzeix/Limoges during the 2024–25 PSA Squash Tour.

== Titles and finals ==
Year	Tournament	Opponent	Result	Score	Ref(s)
2025	SRFI Indian Tour	(India) Anahat Singh	Loss	1–3 (6-11, 11-8, 8-11, 5-11)	

== See also ==
- Squash in India
- India women's national squash team
