= 2022–23 PSA World Championships Qualifying Event =

2022–23 PSA World Tour

Details
- Event name: 2022–23 PSA World Tour Finals
- Location: Birmingham
- Venue: Edgbaston Priory Club
- Dates: April 12–14, 2023
- Website; PSA World Championships Qualifying Event
- Year: 2022–23 PSA World Tour

2022–23 PSA World Championship Qualifying Event will determine the six qualifiers (six men's and six women's) for the 2022-23 PSA World Championship to be held in Chicago on May 3–11.

The qualifying tournament takes place at Edgbaston Priory Club, Birmingham during April 12–14 and is played alongside the British Open.

The draw is made up of 42 men's and 42 women's with six seeds receiving a bye to second round thus joining the 18 winners from first round. Winners of six finals will earn a spot in the PSA World Championship.

== Seeds ==
=== Men's ===
1. (England) Curtis Malik (qualified)
2. (Egypt) Mohamed Abouelghar (qualified)
3. (Pakistan) Asim Khan (semifinals)
4. (Malaysia) Ivan Yuen (qualified)
5. (India) Abhay Singh (qualified)
6. (Czech Republic) Martin Švec (final)

=== Women's ===
1. (Egypt) Nardine Garas (semifinals)
2. (Germany) Saskia Beinhard (semifinals)
3. (Malaysia) Aira Azman (qualified)
4. (Egypt) Zeina Zein (qualified)
5. (Australia) Jessica Turnbull (semifinals)
6. (Switzerland) Nadia Pfister (semifinals)

== Qualifiers ==
=== Men's ===
1. (England) Curtis Malik
2. (Egypt) Mohamed Abouelghar
3. (France) Edwin Clain
4. (Malaysia) Ivan Yuen
5. (India) Abhay Singh
6. (England) Simon Herbert

=== Women's ===
1. (Spain) Marta Domínguez
2. (Malaysia) Ainaa Amani
3. (Malaysia) Aira Azman
4. (Egypt) Zeina Zein
5. (Egypt) Malak Khafagy
6. (Malaysia) Yasshmita Jadishkumar

== Draws ==
Times are British Summer Time (UTC+01:00). To the best of five games.

=== Men's ===
==== Qualifier #1 ====
Quarterfinals (12 April)
(Israel) Daniel Poleshchuk	9	7	11	11	11
(Wales) Emyr Evans	11	11	2	9	3
(Germany) Yannik Omlor	0	11	11	11
(Guatemala) Josué Enríquez	11	8	4	5
(South Africa) Dewald van Niekerk	13	7	4	11	11
(Egypt) Seif Shenawy	11	11	11	9	6

Semifinals (13 April)
1	(England) Curtis Malik	7	11	11	11
(Israel) Daniel Poleshchuk	11	8	8	9
(Germany) Yannik Omlor	11	11	11
(South Africa) Dewald van Niekerk	8	2	9

Final (14 April)
1	(England) Curtis Malik	11	6	11	11
(Germany) Yannik Omlor	3	11	5	6

Matches

Date	Round	Time	Player 1	Player 2	Score
12 April	Quarterfinals	12:00	Daniel Poleshchuk (ISR)	Emyr Evans (WAL)	9–11, 7–11, 11–2, 11–9, 11–3
12 April	Quarterfinals	12:00	Yannik Omlor (GER)	Josué Enríquez (GUA)	0–11, 11–8, 11–4, 11–5
12 April	Quarterfinals	12:45	Dewald van Niekerk (RSA)	Seif Shenawy (EGY)	13–11, 7–11, 4–11, 11–9, 11–6
13 April	Semifinals	12:00	Curtis Malik (ENG)	Daniel Poleshchuk (ISR)	7–11, 11–8, 11–8, 11–9
13 April	Semifinals	12:00	Yannik Omlor (GER)	Dewald van Niekerk (RSA)	11–8, 11–2, 11–9
14 April	Final	12:00	Curtis Malik (ENG)	Yannik Omlor (GER)	11–3, 6–11, 11–5, 11–6

==== Qualifier #2 ====
Quarterfinals (12 April)
(Austria) Aqeel Rehman	6	2	4
(Japan) Ryūnosuke Tsukue	11	11	11
(Malaysia) Mohd Syafiq Kamal	11	10	11	9	10
(England) James Peach	6	12	9	11	12
(Hong Kong) Wong Chi Him	11	7	6	11	10
(Malaysia) Addeen Idrakie	7	11	11	9	12

Semifinals (13 April)
2	(Egypt) Mohamed Abouelghar	11	11	11
(Japan) Ryūnosuke Tsukue	7	9	6
(England) James Peach	5	7	11	11	11
(Malaysia) Addeen Idrakie	11	11	5	4	3

Final (14 April)
2	(Egypt) Mohamed Abouelghar	11	11	5	11
(England) James Peach	5	7	11	6

Matches

Date	Round	Time	Player 1	Player 2	Score
12 April	Quarterfinals	16:30	Aqeel Rehman (AUT)	Ryūnosuke Tsukue (JPN)	11–6, 11–2, 11–4
12 April	Quarterfinals	17:15	Mohd Syafiq Kamal (MYS)	James Peach (ENG)	6–11, 12–10, 9–11, 11–9, 12–10
12 April	Quarterfinals	17:15	Wong Chi Him (HKG)	Addeen Idrakie (MYS)	7–11, 11–7, 11–6, 9–11, 12–10
13 April	Semifinals	14:45	Mohamed Abouelghar (EGY)	Ryūnosuke Tsukue (JPN)	11–7, 11–9, 11–6
13 April	Semifinals	14:45	James Peach (ENG)	Addeen Idrakie (MYS)	5–11, 7–11, 11–5, 11–4, 11–3
14 April	Final	14:45	Mohamed Abouelghar (EGY)	James Peach (ENG)	11–5, 11–7, 5–11, 11–6

==== Qualifier #3 ====
Quarterfinals (12 April)
(France) Edwin Clain	11	5	11	7	11
(England) Ben Smith	5	11	9	11	4
(England) Tom Walsh	11	11	11
(Belgium) Joeri Hapers	8	4	4
(New Zealand) Temwa Chileshe	6	11	5	3
(Egypt) Ibrahim Elkabbani	11	5	11	11

Semifinals (13 April)
3	(Pakistan) Asim Khan	11	4	8	5
(France) Edwin Clain	2	11	11	11
(England) Tom Walsh	11	11	6	6	11
(Egypt) Ibrahim Elkabbani	8	6	11	11	6

Final (14 April)
(France) Edwin Clain	11	8	11	7	11
(England) Tom Walsh	8	11	9	11	6

Matches

Date	Round	Time	Player 1	Player 2	Score
12 April	Quarterfinals	18:00	Edwin Clain (FRA)	Ben Smith (ENG)	11–5, 5–11, 11–9, 7–11, 11–4
12 April	Quarterfinals	18:00	Tom Walsh (ENG)	Joeri Hapers (BEL)	11–8, 11–4, 11–4
12 April	Quarterfinals	18:45	Temwa Chileshe (NZL)	Ibrahim Elkabbani (EGY)	11–6, 5–11, 11–5, 11–3
13 April	Semifinals	15:30	Asim Khan (PAK)	Edwin Clain (FRA)	2–11, 11–4, 11–8, 11–5
13 April	Semifinals	15:30	Tom Walsh (ENG)	Ibrahim Elkabbani (EGY)	11–8, 11–6, 6–11, 6–11, 11–6
14 April	Final	15:30	Edwin Clain (FRA)	Tom Walsh (ENG)	11–8, 8–11, 11–9, 7–11, 11–6

==== Qualifier #4 ====
Quarterfinals (12 April)
(Switzerland) Yannick Wilhelmi	11	11	11
(New Zealand) Lwamba Chileshe	9	8	9
(United States) Spencer Lovejoy	14	11	10	8	8
(England) Finnlay Withington	12	9	12	11	11
(Wales) Owain Taylor	5	8	7
(Spain) Edmon López	11	11	11

Semifinals (13 April)
4	(Malaysia) Ivan Yuen	7	11	11	9	11
(Switzerland) Yannick Wilhelmi	11	6	3	11	5
(England) Finnlay Withington	11	11	3	11
(Spain) Edmon López	5	4	11	4

Final (14 April)
4	(Malaysia) Ivan Yuen	13	11	14
(England) Finnlay Withington	11	4	12

Matches

Date	Round	Time	Player 1	Player 2	Score
12 April	Quarterfinals	18:45	Yannick Wilhelmi (SUI)	Lwamba Chileshe (NZL)	11–9, 11–8, 11–9
12 April	Quarterfinals	19:30	Spencer Lovejoy (USA)	Finnlay Withington (ENG)	12–14, 9–11, 12–10, 11–8, 11–8
12 April	Quarterfinals	19:30	Owain Taylor (WAL)	Edmon López (ESP)	11–5, 11–8, 11–7
13 April	Semifinals	16:15	Ivan Yuen (MYS)	Yannick Wilhelmi (SUI)	7–11, 11–6, 11–3, 9–11, 11–5
13 April	Semifinals	16:15	Finnlay Withington (ENG)	Edmon López (ESP)	11–5, 11–4, 3–11, 11–4
14 April	Final	16:15	Ivan Yuen (MYS)	Finnlay Withington (ENG)	13–11, 11–4, 14–12

==== Qualifier #5 ====
Quarterfinals (12 April)
(Czech Republic) Viktor Byrtus	11	8	11	9	9
(Spain) Iván Pérez	8	11	8	11	11
(England) Ben Coleman	11	11	11
(Colombia) Andrés Herrera	8	9	8
(Hong Kong) Tang Ming Hong	6	11	11	8	11
(United States) Christopher Gordon	11	8	4	11	7

Semifinals (13 April)
5	(India) Abhay Singh	11	11	9	11
(Spain) Iván Pérez	5	7	11	7
(England) Ben Coleman	11	11	12
(Hong Kong) Tang Ming Hong	5	3	10

Final (14 April)
5	(India) Abhay Singh	17	11	11
(England) Ben Coleman	15	8	3

Matches

Date	Round	Time	Player 1	Player 2	Score
12 April	Quarterfinals	14:15	Viktor Byrtus (CZE)	Iván Pérez (ESP)	8–11, 11–8, 8–11, 11–9, 11–9
12 April	Quarterfinals	14:15	Ben Coleman (ENG)	Andrés Herrera (COL)	11–8, 11–9, 11–8
12 April	Quarterfinals	16:30	Tang Ming Hong (HKG)	Christopher Gordon (USA)	6–11, 11–8, 11–4, 8–11, 11–7
13 April	Semifinals	13:30	Abhay Singh (IND)	Iván Pérez (ESP)	11–5, 11–7, 9–11, 11–7
13 April	Semifinals	13:30	Ben Coleman (ENG)	Tang Ming Hong (HKG)	11–5, 11–3, 12–10
14 April	Final	13:30	Abhay Singh (IND)	Ben Coleman (ENG)	17–15, 11–8, 11–3

==== Qualifier #6 ====
Quarterfinals (12 April)
(England) Perry Malik	11	14	6	11
(Egypt) Khaled Labib	3	12	11	9
(Czech Republic) Daniel Mekbib	8	11	11	11
(Egypt) Mohamed Nasser	11	4	1	7
(Australia) Joseph White	11	6	8	8
(England) Simon Herbert	7	11	11	11

Semifinals (13 April)
6	(Czech Republic) Martin Švec	11	11	8	11
(England) Perry Malik	4	7	11	4
(Czech Republic) Daniel Mekbib	11	7	4	10
(England) Simon Herbert	9	11	11	12

Final (14 April)
6	(Czech Republic) Martin Švec	5	7	5
(England) Simon Herbert	11	11	11

Matches

Date	Round	Time	Player 1	Player 2	Score
12 April	Quarterfinals	12:45	Perry Malik (ENG)	Khaled Labib (EGY)	11–3, 14–12, 6–11, 11–9
12 April	Quarterfinals	13:30	Daniel Mekbib (CZE)	Mohamed Nasser (EGY)	8–11, 11–4, 11–1, 11–7
12 April	Quarterfinals	13:30	Joseph White (AUS)	Simon Herbert (ENG)	7–11, 11–6, 11–8, 11–8
13 April	Semifinals	12:45	Martin Švec (CZE)	Perry Malik (ENG)	11–4, 11–7, 8–11, 11–4
13 April	Semifinals	12:45	Daniel Mekbib (CZE)	Simon Herbert (ENG)	9–11, 11–7, 11–4, 12–10
14 April	Final	12:45	Martin Švec (CZE)	Simon Herbert (ENG)	11–5, 11–7, 11–5

=== Women's ===
==== Qualifier #1 ====
Quarterfinals (12 April)
(England) Saran Nghiem	6	7	4
(England) Alicia Mead	11	11	11
(Hong Kong) Heylie Fung	11	14	11
(Switzerland) Céline Walser	7	12	6
(France) Léa Barbeau	2	1	9
(Spain) Marta Domínguez	11	11	11

Semifinals (13 April)
1	(Egypt) Nardine Garas	11	15	4	10
(England) Alicia Mead	2	17	11	12
(Hong Kong) Heylie Fung	11	5	8	8
(Spain) Marta Domínguez	9	11	11	11

Final (14 April)
(England) Alicia Mead	3	11	6	4
(Spain) Marta Domínguez	11	7	11	11

Matches

Date	Round	Time	Player 1	Player 2	Score
12 April	Quarterfinals	12:00	Saran Nghiem (ENG)	Alicia Mead (ENG)	11–6, 11–7, 11–4
12 April	Quarterfinals	12:00	Heylie Fung (HKG)	Céline Walser (SUI)	11–7, 14–12, 11–6
12 April	Quarterfinals	12:45	Léa Barbeau (FRA)	Marta Domínguez (ESP)	11–2, 11–1, 11–9
13 April	Semifinals	12:00	Nardine Garas (EGY)	Alicia Mead (ENG)	2–11, 17–15, 11–4, 12–10
13 April	Semifinals	12:00	Heylie Fung (HKG)	Marta Domínguez (ESP)	9–11, 11–5, 11–8, 11–8
14 April	Final	12:00	Alicia Mead (ENG)	Marta Domínguez (ESP)	11–3, 7–11, 11–6, 11–4

==== Qualifier #2 ====
Quarterfinals (12 April)
(Egypt) Nour Heikal	4	4	6
(Malaysia) Ainaa Amani	11	11	11
(Japan) Akari Midorikawa	9	8	11	9
(Germany) Katerina Týcová	11	11	8	11
(Austria) Jacqueline Peychär	11	11	9	9	11
(Australia) Sarah Cardwell	4	8	11	11	6

Semifinals (13 April)
2	(Germany) Saskia Beinhard	8	6	5
(Malaysia) Ainaa Amani	11	11	11
(Germany) Katerina Týcová	11	11	7	11
(Austria) Jacqueline Peychär	6	9	11	6

Final (14 April)
(Malaysia) Ainaa Amani	6	11	11	11
(Germany) Katerina Týcová	11	5	9	6

Matches

Date	Round	Time	Player 1	Player 2	Score
12 April	Quarterfinals	12:45	Nour Heikal (EGY)	Ainaa Amani (MYS)	11–4, 11–4, 11–6
12 April	Quarterfinals	13:30	Akari Midorikawa (JPN)	Katerina Týcová (GER)	11–9, 11–8, 8–11, 11–9
12 April	Quarterfinals	13:30	Jacqueline Peychär (AUT)	Sarah Cardwell (AUS)	11–4, 11–8, 9–11, 9–11, 11–6
13 April	Semifinals	12:45	Saskia Beinhard (GER)	Ainaa Amani (MYS)	11–8, 11–6, 11–5
13 April	Semifinals	12:45	Katerina Týcová (GER)	Jacqueline Peychär (AUT)	11–6, 11–9, 7–11, 11–6
14 April	Final	12:45	Ainaa Amani (MYS)	Katerina Týcová (GER)	6–11, 11–5, 11–9, 11–6

==== Qualifier #3 ====
Quarterfinals (12 April)
(Wales) Ali Loke	11	5	5	9
(Australia) Alex Haydon	7	11	11	11
(Hong Kong) Cheng Nga Ching	11	11	11
(Portugal) Sofia Aveiro	1	4	6
(Hungary) Kincső Szász	3	6	1
(Egypt) Menna Hamed	11	11	11

Semifinals (13 April)
3	(Malaysia) Aira Azman	11	11	11
(Australia) Alex Haydon	6	3	8
(Hong Kong) Cheng Nga Ching	10	3	9
(Egypt) Menna Hamed	12	11	11

Final (14 April)
3	(Malaysia) Aira Azman	11	11	11
(Egypt) Menna Hamed	8	6	4

Matches

Date	Round	Time	Player 1	Player 2	Score
12 April	Quarterfinals	14:15	Ali Loke (WAL)	Alex Haydon (AUS)	7–11, 11–5, 11–5, 11–9
12 April	Quarterfinals	14:15	Cheng Nga Ching (HKG)	Sofia Aveiro (POR)	11–1, 11–4, 11–6
12 April	Quarterfinals	16:30	Kincső Szász (HUN)	Menna Hamed (EGY)	11–3, 11–6, 11–1
13 April	Semifinals	13:30	Aira Azman (MYS)	Alex Haydon (AUS)	11–6, 11–3, 11–8
13 April	Semifinals	13:30	Cheng Nga Ching (HKG)	Menna Hamed (EGY)	12–10, 11–3, 11–9
14 April	Final	13:30	Aira Azman (MYS)	Menna Hamed (EGY)	11–8, 11–6, 11–4

==== Qualifier #4 ====
Quarterfinals (12 April)
(France) Élise Romba	1	2	4
(England) Torrie Malik	11	11	11
(Scotland) Alison Thomson	11	11	11
(Denmark) Klara Møller	5	5	7
(India) Tanvi Khanna	12	11	11
(New Zealand) Kaitlyn Watts	10	8	2

Semifinals (13 April)
4	(Egypt) Zeina Zein	11	11	8	12
(England) Torrie Malik	7	5	11	10
(Scotland) Alison Thomson	4	5	7
(India) Tanvi Khanna	11	11	11

Final (14 April)
4	(Egypt) Zeina Zein	11	11	11
(India) Tanvi Khanna	8	5	5

Matches

Date	Round	Time	Player 1	Player 2	Score
12 April	Quarterfinals	16:30	Élise Romba (FRA)	Torrie Malik (ENG)	11–1, 11–2, 11–4
12 April	Quarterfinals	17:15	Alison Thomson (SCO)	Klara Møller (DEN)	11–5, 11–5, 11–7
12 April	Quarterfinals	17:15	Tanvi Khanna (IND)	Kaitlyn Watts (NZL)	12–10, 11–8, 11–2
13 April	Semifinals	14:45	Zeina Zein (EGY)	Torrie Malik (ENG)	11–7, 11–5, 8–11, 12–10
13 April	Semifinals	14:45	Alison Thomson (SCO)	Tanvi Khanna (IND)	11–4, 11–5, 11–7
14 April	Final	14:45	Zeina Zein (EGY)	Tanvi Khanna (IND)	11–8, 11–5, 11–5

==== Qualifier #5 ====
Quarterfinals (12 April)
(Switzerland) Ambre Allinckx	6	6	5
(Egypt) Malak Khafagy	11	11	11
(England) Anna Kimberley	11	11	11
(Spain) Sofía Mateos	5	8	9
(England) Asia Harris	8	11	12	11
(Malaysia) Yee Xin Ying	11	8	10	6

Semifinals (13 April)
5	(Australia) Jessica Turnbull	11	6	11	10	2
(Egypt) Malak Khafagy	8	11	9	12	11
(England) Anna Kimberley	10	12	7	11	7
(England) Asia Harris	12	10	11	5	11

Final (14 April)
(Egypt) Malak Khafagy	11	11	11
(England) Asia Harris	9	6	6

Matches

Date	Round	Time	Player 1	Player 2	Score
12 April	Quarterfinals	18:00	Ambre Allinckx (SUI)	Malak Khafagy (EGY)	11–6, 11–6, 11–5
12 April	Quarterfinals	18:00	Anna Kimberley (ENG)	Sofía Mateos (ESP)	11–5, 11–8, 11–9
12 April	Quarterfinals	18:45	Asia Harris (ENG)	Yee Xin Ying (MYS)	8–11, 11–8, 12–10, 11–6
13 April	Semifinals	15:30	Jessica Turnbull (AUS)	Malak Khafagy (EGY)	8–11, 11–6, 9–11, 12–10, 11–2
13 April	Semifinals	15:30	Anna Kimberley (ENG)	Asia Harris (ENG)	12–10, 10–12, 11–7, 5–11, 11–7
14 April	Final	15:30	Malak Khafagy (EGY)	Asia Harris (ENG)	11–9, 11–6, 11–6

==== Qualifier #6 ====
Quarterfinals (12 April)
(Finland) Emilia Korhonen	2	3	5
(Malaysia) Chan Yiwen	11	11	11
(Singapore) Wai Yhann Au Yeong	6	11	11	11	6
(England) Kiera Marshall	11	13	9	8	11
(Malaysia) Yasshmita Jadishkumar	11	4	4	12	11
(Egypt) Rana Ismail	7	11	11	10	5

Semifinals (13 April)
6	(Switzerland) Nadia Pfister	11	4	5	9
(Malaysia) Chan Yiwen	5	11	11	11
(England) Kiera Marshall	11	11	6	9	11
(Malaysia) Yasshmita Jadishkumar	7	3	11	11	13

Final (14 April)
(Malaysia) Chan Yiwen	11	11	8	9	6
(Malaysia) Yasshmita Jadishkumar	8	7	11	11	11

Matches

Date	Round	Time	Player 1	Player 2	Score
12 April	Quarterfinals	18:45	Emilia Korhonen (FIN)	Chan Yiwen (MYS)	11–2, 11–3, 11–5
12 April	Quarterfinals	19:30	Wai Yhann Au Yeong (SGP)	Kiera Marshall (ENG)	11–6, 13–11, 9–11, 8–11, 11–6
12 April	Quarterfinals	19:30	Yasshmita Jadishkumar (MYS)	Rana Ismail (EGY)	11–7, 4–11, 4–11, 12–10, 11–5
13 April	Semifinals	16:15	Nadia Pfister (SUI)	Chan Yiwen (MYS)	5–11, 11–4, 11–5, 11–9
13 April	Semifinals	16:15	Kiera Marshall (ENG)	Yasshmita Jadishkumar (MYS)	7–11, 3–11, 11–6, 11–9, 13–11
14 April	Final	16:15	Chan Yiwen (MYS)	Yasshmita Jadishkumar (MYS)	8–11, 7–11, 11–8, 11–9, 11–6

== See also ==
- 2023 PSA Men's World Squash Championship
- 2023 PSA Women's World Squash Championship
- 2022–23 PSA World Tour
