= 2025 Women's World Squash Championship =

International squash tournament

- 40th Women's World Squash Championship
- Location: Chicago, United States
- Venue: University Club of Chicago; Lakeshore Sport & Fitness
- Date: 9–18 May 2025
- Website https://worldsquashchamps.com/
- Category: PSA World Championships
- Prize money: $600,000

Results
- Champion: (Egypt) Nour El Sherbini
- Runner-up: (Egypt) Hania El Hammamy
- Semi-finalists: (Egypt) Nouran Gohar (United States) Olivia Weaver

The 2025 Women's World Squash Championship was the 2025 women's edition of the World Squash Championships, which serves as the individual world championship for squash players. The event took place in Chicago, United States, from 9 to 18 May 2025. It was the fourth time that Chicago hosted the PSA World Championships, having previously hosted the 2019, 2021 & 2023 editions.

Nour El Sherbini won her eighth world title, defeating Hania El Hammamy in the final. The win equalled the all-time record set by Malaysian Nicol David from 2005 to 2014.

== Venues ==
University Club of Chicago and Lakeshore Sport & Fitness are the two venues that host the competition.

== Seeds ==
Click on the seed number of a player to go to their draw section.

1. (Egypt) Nouran Gohar
2. (Egypt) Nour El Sherbini
3. (Egypt) Hania El Hammamy
4. (United States) Olivia Weaver
5. (Egypt) Amina Orfi (Third round)
6. (Belgium) Tinne Gilis (Third round)
7. (Malaysia) Sivasangari Subramaniam (Quarter finals)
8. (England) Georgina Kennedy (Quarter finals)

9. (Egypt) Rowan Elaraby (Third round)
10. (Belgium) Nele Gilis-Coll (Third round)
11. (Japan) Satomi Watanabe (Quarter finals)
12. (Egypt) Salma Hany (Third round)
13. (Egypt) Fayrouz Aboelkheir (Third round)
14. (Egypt) Nada Abbas (Quarter finals)
15. (United States) Amanda Sobhy (Third round)
16. (Egypt) Farida Mohamed (Third round)

== Draw and results ==
=== Key ===
- rtd. = Retired
- Q = Qualifier
- WC = Host wild card
- w/o = Walkover

=== Finals ===
Semi finals
1	(Egypt) Nouran Gohar	11	8	7	6
3	(Egypt) Hania El Hammamy	9	11	11	11
4	(United States) Olivia Weaver	1	11	11	8	4
2	(Egypt) Nour El Sherbini	11	7	7	11	11

Final
3	(Egypt) Hania El Hammamy	5	9	11	7
2	(Egypt) Nour El Sherbini	11	11	4	11

=== Top half ===
==== Section 1 ====
First round
1	(Egypt) Nouran Gohar	11	11	11
(Egypt) Nadine Shahin	6	1	7
17/32	(Egypt) Malak Khafagy	11	11	6	4	11
(Egypt) Mariam Metwally	5	9	11	11	5
Q	(India) Anahat Singh	10	12	6	11	11
17/32	(United States) Marina Stefanoni	11	10	11	6	6
(Egypt) Hana Moataz	7	11	4	10
13	(Egypt) Fayrouz Aboelkheir	11	8	11	12
11	(Japan) Satomi Watanabe	11	11	11
(Switzerland) Cindy Merlo	6	5	9
17/32	(England) Sarah-Jane Perry	11	11	10	11
(Hong Kong) Tong Tsz-Wing	5	6	12	6
(England) Alicia Mead	6	8	11	4
17/32	(Wales) Tesni Murphy	11	11	6	11
(France) Marie Stephan	10	9	6
6	(Belgium) Tinne Gilis	12	11	11

Second round
1	(Egypt) Nouran Gohar	11	11	11
17/32	(Egypt) Malak Khafagy	4	3	3
Q	(India) Anahat Singh	7	11	4	3
13	(Egypt) Fayrouz Aboelkheir	11	8	11	11
11	(Japan) Satomi Watanabe	11	3	14	11
17/32	(England) Sarah-Jane Perry	7	11	12	7
17/32	(Wales) Tesni Murphy	8	11	4	11
6	(Belgium) Tinne Gilis	11	5	11	13

Third Round
1	(Egypt) Nouran Gohar	12	9	11	11
13	(Egypt) Fayrouz Aboelkheir	10	11	8	5
11	(Japan) Satomi Watanabe	11	11	9	11
6	(Belgium) Tinne Gilis	2	9	11	8

Quarter finals
1	(Egypt) Nouran Gohar	11	11	11
11	(Japan) Satomi Watanabe	7	8	7

==== Section 2 ====
First round
5	(Egypt) Amina Orfi	11	11	11
(Egypt) Haya Ali	9	0	2
17/32	(England) Jasmine Hutton	11	11	11
WC	(United States) Riya Navani	7	6	4
(Egypt) Salma Eltayeb	11	11	3	3
17/32	(France) Mélissa Alves	13	4	11	11
Q	(United States) Lucie Stefanoni	8	5	4
14	(Egypt) Nada Abbas	11	11	11
10	(Belgium) Nele Gillis-Coll	6	11	11	11
(Hong Kong) Lee Ka Yi	11	5	9	8
17/32	(Hong Kong) Tomato Ho	9	10	11	12
(Wales) Emily Whitlock	11	12	9	14
(England) Grace Gear	6	7	11	7
17/32	(England) Lucy Turmel	11	11	8	11
(Egypt) Nour Aboulmakarim	5	4	11	2
3	(Egypt) Hania El Hammamy	11	11	8	11

Second round
5	(Egypt) Amina Orfi	11	11	16
17/32	(England) Jasmine Hutton	6	6	14
17/32	(France) Mélissa Alves	6	11	11	7	7
14	(Egypt) Nada Abbas	11	2	9	11	11
10	(Belgium) Nele Gillis-Coll	11	11	11
(Wales) Emily Whitlock	5	8	7
17/32	(England) Lucy Turmel	6	7	6
3	(Egypt) Hania El Hammamy	11	11	11

Third Round
5	(Egypt) Amina Orfi	11	13	5	7	8
14	(Egypt) Nada Abbas	3	11	11	11	11
10	(Belgium) Nele Gillis-Coll	4	7	5
3	(Egypt) Hania El Hammamy	11	11	11

Quarter finals
14	(Egypt) Nada Abbas	6	5	10
3	(Egypt) Hania El Hammamy	11	11	12

=== Bottom half ===
==== Section 3 ====
First round
4	(United States) Olivia Weaver	11	11	11
(Malaysia) Aifa Azman	3	2	1
17/32	(Malaysia) Rachel Arnold	11	11	4	11
(Egypt) Nour Heikal	9	9	11	3
(England) Torrie Malik	8	12	7	8
17/32	(Malaysia) Aira Azman	11	10	11	11
(Egypt) Menna Hamed	9	11	9	3
12	(Egypt) Salma Hany	11	8	11	11
15	(United States) Amanda Sobhy	11	11	11
(Malaysia) Ainaa Amani	3	2	3
17/32	(Egypt) Zeina Mickawy	9	5	11	13
(Egypt) Kenzy Ayman	11	11	6	15
(Finland) Emilia Soini	8	5	5
17/32	(Egypt) Sana Ibrahim	11	11	11
(Spain) Marta Domínguez	4	5	18	2
7	(Malaysia) Sivasangari Subramaniam	11	11	16	11

Second round
4	(United States) Olivia Weaver	11	11	11	11
17/32	(Malaysia) Rachel Arnold	5	2	13	5
17/32	(Malaysia) Aira Azman	6	10	4
12	(Egypt) Salma Hany	11	12	11
15	(United States) Amanda Sobhy	11	11	11
(Egypt) Kenzy Ayman	4	3	4
17/32	(Egypt) Sana Ibrahim	4	6	11	5
7	(Malaysia) Sivasangari Subramaniam	11	11	5	11

Third Round
4	(United States) Olivia Weaver	11	9	11	11
12	(Egypt) Salma Hany	7	11	7	4
15	(United States) Amanda Sobhy	8	12	6
7	(Malaysia) Sivasangari Subramaniam	11	14	11

Quarter finals
4	(United States) Olivia Weaver	11	8	11	11
7	(Malaysia) Sivasangari Subramaniam	3	11	4	5

==== Section 4 ====
First round
8	(England) Georgina Kennedy	11	11	11
(Australia) Jessica van der Walt	3	7	3
17/32	(Scotland) Georgia Adderley	11	11	11
(England) Lucy Beecroft	5	4	6
Q	(Egypt) Nadien Elhammamy	7	8	6
17/32	(Scotland) Lisa Aitken	11	11	11
(New Zealand) Joelle King	5	6	11	3
9	(Egypt) Rowan Elaraby	11	11	7	11
16	(Egypt) Farida Mohamed	11	15	13
(Canada) Nicole Bunyan	8	13	11
17/32	(Egypt) Hana Ramadan	8	11	5	11	9
(Egypt) Saran Nghiem	11	4	11	5	11
(Egypt) Nardine Garas	11	9	8	11	12
17/32	(Canada) Hollie Naughton	7	11	11	9	10
Q	(England) Kiera Marshall	3	6	3
2	(Egypt) Nour El Sherbini	11	11	11

Second round
8	(England) Georgina Kennedy	9	11	11	11
17/32	(Scotland) Georgia Adderley	11	9	3	2
17/32	(Scotland) Lisa Aitken	2	0	4
9	(Egypt) Rowan Elaraby	11	11	11
16	(Egypt) Farida Mohamed	11	11	11
(Egypt) Saran Nghiem	7	9	7
(Egypt) Nardine Garas	3	5	11
2	(Egypt) Nour El Sherbini	11	11	13

Third Round
8	(England) Georgina Kennedy	1	11	5
9	(Egypt) Rowan Elaraby	11	8	2^{r}
16	(Egypt) Farida Mohamed	5	12	3	9
2	(Egypt) Nour El Sherbini	11	10	11	11

Quarter finals
8	(England) Georgina Kennedy	8	10	10
2	(Egypt) Nour El Sherbini	11	12	12

== Schedule ==
Times are Central Daylight Time (UTC−05:00). To the best of five games.

Abbreviations:

- UCC - University Club of Chicago
- LSF - Lakeshore Sport & Fitness

=== Round 1 ===
Friday, 9 May

Date	Court	Time	Player 1	Player 2	Score
9 May	UCC, Court 1	11:00	Emily Whitlock (WAL)	Tomato Ho (HKG)	11–9, 12–10, 9–11, 14–12
9 May	UCC, Court 2	11:00	Mélissa Alves (FRA)	Salma Eltayeb (EGY)	13–11, 4–11, 11–3, 11–3
9 May	UCC, Court 3	11:00	Amina Orfi (EGY)	Haya Ali (EGY)	11–9, 11–0, 11–2
9 May	UCC, Court 1	11:45	Nele Gillis-Coll (BEL)	Lee Ka Yi (HKG)	6–11, 11–5, 11–9, 11–8
9 May	UCC, Court 2	11:45	Nada Abbas (EGY)	Lucie Stefanoni (USA)	11–8, 11–5, 11–4
9 May	UCC, Court 3	11:45	Jasmine Hutton (ENG)	Riya Navani (USA)	11–7, 11–6, 11–4
9 May	UCC, Court 1	14:00	Lucy Turmel (ENG)	Grace Gear (ENG)	11–6, 11–7, 8–11, 11–6
9 May	UCC, Court 2	14:00	Sarah-Jane Perry (ENG)	Tong Tsz-Wing (EGY)	11–5, 11–6, 10–12, 11–6
9 May	UCC, Court 1	14:45	Fayrouz Aboelkheir (EGY)	Hana Moataz (EGY)	11–7, 8–11, 11–4, 12–10
9 May	UCC, Court 2	14:45	Satomi Watanabe (JPN)	Cindy Merlo (SUI)	11–6, 11–5, 11–9
9 May	UCC, Court 3	14:45	Hania El Hammamy (EGY)	Nour Aboulmakarim (EGY)	11–5, 11–4, 8–11, 11–2
9 May	UCC, Court 3	16:45	Tesni Murphy (WAL)	Alicia Mead (ENG)	11–6, 11–8, 6–11, 11–4
9 May	UCC, Court 1	18:00	Anahat Singh (IND)	Marina Stefanoni (USA)	10–12, 11–9, 6–11, 11–6, 11–6
9 May	UCC, Court 2	18:00	Nouran Gohar (EGY)	Nadine Shahin (EGY)	11–6, 11–1, 11–4
9 May	UCC, Court 3	18:45	Tinne Gilis (BEL)	Marie Stephan (FRA)	12–10, 11–9, 11–6
9 May	UCC, Court 1	19:30	Malak Khafagy (EGY)	Mariam Metwally (EGY)	11–5, 11–9, 6–11, 4–11, 11–5

Saturday, 10 May

Date	Court	Time	Player 1	Player 2	Score
10 May	UCC, Court 1	11:00	Hollie Naughton (CAN)	Nardine Garas (EGY)	7–11, 11–9, 11–8, 9–11, 10–12
10 May	UCC, Court 2	11:00	Nour El Sherbini (EGY)	Kiera Marshall (ENG)	11–3, 11-6, 11–3
10 May	UCC, Court 3	11:00	Georgia Adderley (SCO)	Lucy Beecroft (ENG)	11–5, 11–4, 11–6
10 May	UCC, Court 1	11:45	Hana Ramadan (EGY)	Saran Nghiem (EGY)	8–11, 11–4, 5–11, 11–5, 9–11
10 May	UCC, Court 2	11:45	Kenzy Ayman (EGY)	Zeina Mickawy (EGY)	11–9, 11–5, 6–11, 15–13
10 May	UCC, Court 3	11:45	Georgina Kennedy (ENG)	Jessica van der Walt (AUS)	11–3, 11–7, 11–3
10 May	UCC, Court 1	14:00	Farida Mohamed (EGY)	Nicole Bunyan (CAN)	11–8, 15–13, 13–11
10 May	UCC, Court 2	14:00	Amanda Sobhy (USA)	Ainaa Amani (MAS)	11–3, 11–2, 11–3
10 May	UCC, Court 1	14:45	Salma Hany (EGY)	Menna Hamed (EGY)	11–9, 8–11, 11–9, 11–3
10 May	UCC, Court 2	14:45	Lisa Aitken (SCO)	Nadien Elhammamy (EGY)	11–7, 11–8, 11–6
10 May	UCC, Court 3	14:45	Sivasangari Subramaniam (MAS)	Marta Domínguez (ESP)	
10 May	UCC, Court 3	16:30	Sana Ibrahim (EGY)	Emilia Soini (FIN)	11–8, 11–5, 11–5
10 May	UCC, Court 1	18:00	Olivia Weaver (USA)	Aifa Azman (MAS)	11–3, 11–2, 11–1
10 May	UCC, Court 2	17:30	Rowan Elaraby (EGY)	Joelle King (NZL)	11–5, 11–6, 7–11, 11–3
10 May	UCC, Court 3	18:45	Rachel Arnold (MAS)	Nour Heikal (EGY)	11–9, 11–9, 4–11, 11–3
10 May	UCC, Court 1	19:30	Aira Azman (MAS)	Torrie Malik (ENG)	11–8, 10–12, 11–7, 11–8

=== Round 2 ===
Sunday, 11 May

Date	Court	Time	Player 1	Player 2	Score
11 May	UCC, Court 1	12:00	Nele Gillis-Coll (BEL)	Emily Whitlock (WAL)	11–5, 11–8, 11–7
11 May	UCC, Court 2	12:00	Nada Abbas (EGY)	Mélissa Alves (FRA)	11–6, 2–11, 9–11, 11–7, 11–7
11 May	UCC, Court 3	12:00	Amina Orfi (EGY)	Jasmine Hutton (ENG)	11–6, 11–6, 16–14,
11 May	LSF, Glass Court	12:00	Hania El Hammamy (EGY)	Lucy Turmel (ENG)	11–6, 11–7, 11–6
11 May	UCC, Court 1	12:45	Fayrouz Aboelkheir (EGY)	Anahat Singh (IND)	11–7, 8–11, 11–4, 11–3
11 May	UCC, Court 2	12:45	Satomi Watanabe (JPN)	Sarah-Jane Perry (ENG)	11–7, 3–11, 14–12, 11–7
11 May	UCC, Court 3	12:45	Tinne Gilis (BEL)	Tesni Murphy (WAL)	11–8, 5–11, 11–4, 13–11
11 May	LSF, Glass Court	12:45	Nouran Gohar (EGY)	Malak Khafagy (EGY)	11–4, 11–3, 11–3
11 May	UCC, Court 1	16:00	Farida Mohamed (EGY)	Saran Nghiem (EGY)	11–7, 11–9, 11–7
11 May	UCC, Court 2	16:00	Rowan Elaraby (EGY)	Lisa Aitken (SCO)	11–2, 11–0, 11–4
11 May	UCC, Court 3	16:00	Georgina Kennedy (ENG)	Georgia Adderley (SCO)	9–11, 11–9, 11–3, 11–2
11 May	LSF, Glass Court	16:00	Nour El Sherbini (EGY)	Nardine Garas (EGY)	11–3, 11–5, 13–11
11 May	UCC, Court 1	16:45	Salma Hany (EGY)	Aira Azman (MAS)	11–6, 12–10, 11–4
11 May	UCC, Court 3	16:45	Sivasangari Subramaniam (MAS)	Sana Ibrahim (EGY)	11–4, 11–6, 5–11, 11–5
11 May	LSF, Glass Court	16:45	Amanda Sobhy (USA)	Kenzy Ayman (EGY)	11–4, 11–3, 11–4
11 May	LSF, Glass Court	18:15	Olivia Weaver (USA)	Rachel Arnold (MAS)	11–5, 11–2, 11–13, 11–5

=== Round 3 ===
Monday, 12 May & Tuesday, 13 May

Date	Court	Time	Player 1	Player 2	Score
12 May	LSF, Glass Court	12:00	Amina Orfi (EGY)	Nada Abbas (EGY)	11–3, 13–11, 5–11, 7–11, 8–11
12 May	LSF, Glass Court	12:45	Nele Gillis-Coll (BEL)	Hania El Hammamy (EGY)	4–11, 7–11, 5–11
12 May	LSF, Glass Court	17:30	Nouran Gohar (EGY)	Fayrouz Aboelkheir (EGY)	12–10, 9–11, 11–8, 11–5
12 May	LSF, Glass Court	18:30	Satomi Watanabe (JPN)	Tinne Gilis (BEL)	11–2, 11–9, 9–11, 11–8
13 May	LSF, Glass Court	12:00	Georgina Kennedy (ENG)	Rowan Elaraby (EGY)	1–11, 11–8, 5–2 ret.
13 May	LSF, Glass Court	12:45	Nour El Sherbini (EGY)	Farida Mohamed (EGY)	11–5, 10–12, 11–3, 11–9
13 May	LSF, Glass Court	17:30	Olivia Weaver (USA)	Salma Hany (EGY)	11–7, 9–11, 11–7, 11–4
13 May	LSF, Glass Court	18:30	Sivasangari Subramaniam (MAS)	Amanda Sobhy (USA)	11–8, 14–12, 11–6

=== Quarter-finals ===
Wednesday, 14 May & Thursday, 15 May

Date	Court	Time	Player 1	Player 2	Score
14 May	LSF, Glass Court	17:30	Nouran Gohar (EGY)	Satomi Watanabe (JPN)	11–7, 11–8, 11–7
14 May	LSF, Glass Court	18:30	Hania El Hammamy (EGY)	Nada Abbas (EGY)	11–6, 11–5, 12–10
15 May	LSF, Glass Court	17:30	Nour El Sherbini (EGY)	Georgina Kennedy (ENG)	11–8, 12–10, 12–10
15 May	LSF, Glass Court	18:30	Olivia Weaver (USA)	Sivasangari Subramaniam (MAS)	11–3, 8–11, 11–4, 11–5

=== Semi-finals ===
Friday, 16 May

Date	Court	Time	Player 1	Player 2	Score
16 May	LSF, Glass Court	17:30	Nouran Gohar (EGY)	Hania El Hammamy (EGY)	11–9, 8–11, 7–11, 6–11
16 May	LSF, Glass Court	18:15	Nour El Sherbini (EGY)	Olivia Weaver (USA)	11–1, 7-11, 7–11, 11–8, 11–4

=== Final ===
Saturday, 17 May

Date	Court	Time	Player 1	Player 2	Score
17 May	LSF, Glass Court	18:00	Hania El Hammamy (EGY)	Nour El Sherbini (EGY)	5–11, 9–11, 11–4, 7–11

== Representation ==
This table shows the number of players by country in the 2025 PSA Women's World Championship. A total of 17 nationalities are represented. Egypt is the most represented nation with 25 players.

	(Egypt) EGY	(United States) USA	(England) ENG	(Japan) JPN	(Malaysia) MAS	(Belgium) BEL	(Scotland) SCO	(Wales) WAL	(France) FRA	(India) IND	(Hong Kong) HKG	(Canada) CAN	(Australia) AUS	(Spain) ESP	(Finland) FIN	(New Zealand) NZL	(Switzerland) SUI	Total
Final	2																	2
Semi-final	3	1																4
Quarter-final	4	1	1	1	1													8
Round 3	9	2	1	1	1	2												16
Round 2	14	2	4	1	3	2	2	2	1	1								32
Round 1	25	5	9	1	5	2	2	2	2	1	3	2	1	1	1	1	1	64

== See also ==
- World Squash Championships
- 2025 Men's World Squash Championship

Preceded by Cairo, Egypt; 2024	PSA World Championships; Chicago, United States; 2025	Succeeded by TBD; 2026
