= 2024 PSA Women's World Squash Championship =

2024 women's edition of the World Squash Championships

2024 Women's World Championship
- 39th PSA Women's World Squash Championship
- Location: Cairo, Egypt
- Venue: National Museum of Egyptian Civilization; Palm Hills Club
- Date: 9–18 May 2024
- Website https://worldsquashchamps.com/
- Category: PSA World Championships
- Prize money: $565,000

Results
- Champion: (Egypt) Nouran Gohar
- Runner-up: (Egypt) Nour El Sherbini
- Semi-finalists: (United States) Olivia Weaver (Egypt) Hania El Hammamy

The 2024 PSA Women's World Squash Championship was the 2024 women's edition of the World Squash Championships, which served as the individual world championship for squash players. The event took place in Cairo, Egypt, from 9 to 18 May 2024. It was the fourth time that Cairo hosted the PSA World Championships after 2014, 2019–20 & 2022 editions.

Top seed Nour El Sherbini and third seed Nouran Gohar met in the final for the fourth consecutive championship. El Sherbini defeated Olivia Weaver in the semi-final, while second seed Hania El Hammamy was eliminated by Gohar. Gohar finally gained revenge on El Sherbini, winning the final to record her first World Championship crown.

== World ranking points/prize money ==
PSA also awards points towards World ranking. Points are awarded as follows:

| PSA World Squash Championships | | Ranking Points | | | | | | |
| Rank | Prize money US$ | Winner | Runner up | 3/4 | 5/8 | 9/16 | 17/32 | 33/64 |
|---|---|---|---|---|---|---|---|---|
| World Squash Championships | $565,000 | 3175 | 2090 | 1270 | 780 | 475 | 290 | 177.5 |

=== Prize money breakdown ===
Total prize money for the tournament is $1,130,000, $565,000 per gender. This is about a 1.5% prize fund increase from previous World Championships (2022–23; $550,000 per gender).

| Position (num. of players) | | % breakdown | Prize money (Total: $565,000) |
|---|---|---|---|
| Winner | (1) | 16% | $90,400 |
| Runner-up | (1) | 10% | $56,500 |
| 3/4 | (2) | 6% | $33,900 |
| 5/8 | (4) | 3.50% | $19,775 |
| 9/16 | (8) | 2% | $11,300 |
| 17/32 | (16) | 1% | $5,650 |
| 33/64 | (32) | 0.50% | $2,825 |

== Venues ==
National Museum of Egyptian Civilization and Palm Hills Club in Cairo are the two venues that hoste the competition.

| National Museum of Egyptian Civilization | Palm Hills Club |
2024 PSA Women's World Squash Championship (Cairo Giza)

== Seeds ==
Click on the seed number of a player to go to their draw section.

1. (Egypt) Nour El Sherbini (runner-up)
2. (Egypt) Hania El Hammamy (semi finals)
3. (Egypt) Nouran Gohar (champion)
4. (Belgium) Nele Gilis (Third Round)
5. (Egypt) Nour El Tayeb (Quarter finals)
6. (England) Georgina Kennedy (Third Round)
7. (Belgium) Tinne Gilis (Quarter finals)
8. (United States) Olivia Weaver (semi finals)

9. (Egypt) Rowan Elaraby (Quarter finals)
10. (Egypt) Salma Hany (Third Round)
11. (Egypt) Amina Orfi (Third Round)
12. (United States) Sabrina Sobhy (Third Round)
13. (Japan) Satomi Watanabe (Third Round)
14. (Malaysia) Sivasangari Subramaniam (Third Round)
15. (England) Sarah-Jane Perry (Third Round)
16. (Egypt) Nada Abbas (First round)

== Draw and results ==
=== Key ===
- rtd. = Retired
- Q = Qualifier
- WC = Host wild card
- w/o = Walkover

=== Finals ===
Semi finals
1 | (Egypt) Nour El Sherbini | 7 | 11 | 6 | 11 | 11
8 | (United States) Olivia Weaver | 11 | 5 | 11 | 5 | 5
3 | (Egypt) Nouran Gohar | 12 | 11 | 11 | 11
2 | (Egypt) Hania El Hammamy | 14 | 2 | 5 | 7

Final
1 | (Egypt) Nour El Sherbini | 8 | 11 | 7 | 5
3 | (Egypt) Nouran Gohar | 11 | 9 | 11 | 11

=== Top half ===
==== Section 1 ====
First round
1 | (Egypt) Nour El Sherbini | 11 | 11 | 11
(Australia) Jessica Turnbull | 0 | 4 | 4
(Egypt) Menna Hamed | 5 | 9 | 12 | 11 | 11
Q | (Egypt) Nardine Garas | 11 | 11 | 10 | 9 | 8
(Wales) Tesni Murphy | 11 | 11 | 11
(France) Énora Villard | 6 | 4 | 0
(Hong Kong) Lee Ka Yi | 7 | 3 | 6
11 | (Egypt) Amina Orfi | 11 | 11 | 11
15 | (England) Sarah-Jane Perry | 13 | 7 | 11 | 11
(England) Jasmine Hutton | 11 | 11 | 8 | 8
(Canada) Danielle Ray | 11 | 7 | 9 | 14 | 7
(Switzerland) Cindy Merlo | 4 | 11 | 11 | 12 | 11
WC | (Egypt) Amina El Rihany | 11 | 11 | 11 | 11
(England) Millie Tomlinson | 13 | 7 | 8 | 7
(Malaysia) Aifa Azman | 4 | 3 | 2
7 | (Belgium) Tinne Gilis | 11 | 11 | 11

Second round
1 | (Egypt) Nour El Sherbini | 11 | 11 | 11
(Egypt) Menna Hamed | 5 | 3 | 1
(Wales) Tesni Murphy | 6 | 4 | 9
11 | (Egypt) Amina Orfi | 11 | 11 | 11
15 | (England) Sarah-Jane Perry | 6 | 11 | 11 | 11
(Switzerland) Cindy Merlo | 11 | 7 | 4 | 8
WC | (Egypt) Amina El Rihany | 6 | 6 | 3
7 | (Belgium) Tinne Gilis | 11 | 11 | 11

Third Round
1 | (Egypt) Nour El Sherbini | 11 | 12 | 11
11 | (Egypt) Amina Orfi | 5 | 10 | 8
15 | (England) Sarah-Jane Perry | 7 | 7 | 3
7 | (Belgium) Tinne Gilis | 11 | 11 | 11

Quarter finals
1 | (Egypt) Nour El Sherbini | 11 | 11 | 11
7 | (Belgium) Tinne Gilis | 2 | 8 | 5

==== Section 2 ====
First round
8 | (United States) Olivia Weaver | 11 | 11 | 11
(Egypt) Haya Ali | 4 | 1 | 1
Q | (Spain) Marta Domínguez | 11 | 11 | 7 | 11
Q | (Malaysia) Chan Yiwen | 7 | 7 | 11 | 8
(Egypt) Hana Ramadan | 11 | 12 | 11
Q | (Australia) Alex Haydon | 6 | 10 | 5
(Canada) Hollie Naughton | 5 | 4 | 13 | 11 | 7
10 | (Egypt) Salma Hany | 11 | 11 | 11 | 9 | 11
16 | (Egypt) Nada Abbas | 8 | 7 | 9
(Egypt) Fayrouz Aboelkheir | 11 | 11 | 11
(Scotland) Georgia Adderley | 11 | 11 | 7 | 7 | 7
(Hong Kong) Chan Sin Yuk | 6 | 9 | 11 | 11 | 11
(England) Torrie Malik | 11 | 5 | 11 | 11
(Egypt) Sana Ibrahim | 5 | 11 | 3 | 5
(United States) Marina Stefanoni | 7 | 11 | 4 | 6
4 | (Belgium) Nele Gilis | 11 | 9 | 11 | 11

Second round
8 | (United States) Olivia Weaver | 11 | 11 | 11
Q | (Spain) Marta Domínguez | 2 | 3 | 2
(Egypt) Hana Ramadan | 5 | 5 | 11 | 5
10 | (Egypt) Salma Hany | 11 | 11 | 3 | 11
(Egypt) Fayrouz Aboelkheir | 11 | 9 | 11 | 11
(Hong Kong) Chan Sin Yuk | 7 | 11 | 7 | 9
(England) Torrie Malik | 3 | 7 | 11 | 7
4 | (Belgium) Nele Gilis | 11 | 11 | 3 | 11

Third Round
8 | (United States) Olivia Weaver | 11 | 11 | 11
10 | (Egypt) Salma Hany | 9 | 5 | 9
(Egypt) Fayrouz Aboelkheir | 11 | 11 | 7 | 11
4 | (Belgium) Nele Gilis | 8 | 7 | 11 | 5

Quarter finals
8 | (United States) Olivia Weaver | 11 | 11 | 3 | 11
(Egypt) Fayrouz Aboelkheir | 9 | 6 | 11 | 3

=== Bottom half ===
==== Section 3 ====
First round
3 | (Egypt) Nouran Gohar | 11 | 11 | 11
(Finland) Emilia Soini | 2 | 2 | 1
(Egypt) Hana Moataz | 11 | 11 | 10 | 11
(Egypt) Nadine Shahin | 4 | 9 | 12 | 9
(Egypt) Kenzy Ayman | 12 | 6 | 11 | 2 | 11
(Egypt) Salma El Tayeb | 10 | 11 | 8 | 11 | 8
(England) Alicia Mead | 7 | 4 | 6
12 | (United States) Sabrina Sobhy | 11 | 11 | 11
13 | (Japan) Satomi Watanabe | 14 | 13 | 11
(Wales) Emily Whitlock | 12 | 11 | 8
(Malaysia) Ainaa Amani | 12 | 7 | 10 | 7
(France) Marie Stephan | 10 | 11 | 12 | 11
(Egypt) Mariam Metwally | 11 | 5 | 11 | 11
(Egypt) Zeina Mickawy | 5 | 11 | 8 | 7
(Hong Kong) Tomato Ho | 3 | 4 | 2
5 | (Egypt) Nour El Tayeb | 11 | 11 | 11

Second round
3 | (Egypt) Nouran Gohar | 11 | 9 | 11 | 11
(Egypt) Hana Moataz | 4 | 11 | 6 | 2
(Egypt) Kenzy Ayman | 4 | 6 | 1
12 | (United States) Sabrina Sobhy | 11 | 11 | 11
13 | (Japan) Satomi Watanabe | 11 | 11 | 11
(France) Marie Stephan | 3 | 2 | 3
(Egypt) Mariam Metwally | 11 | 4 | 3
5 | (Egypt) Nour El Tayeb | 13 | 11 | 11

Third Round
3 | (Egypt) Nouran Gohar | 11 | 11 | 11
12 | (United States) Sabrina Sobhy | 3 | 4 | 1
13 | (Japan) Satomi Watanabe | 7 | 10 | 9
5 | (Egypt) Nour El Tayeb | 11 | 12 | 11

Quarter finals
3 | (Egypt) Nouran Gohar | 11 | 7 | 11 | 11
5 | (Egypt) Nour El Tayeb | 3 | 11 | 4 | 9

==== Section 4 ====
First round
6 | (England) Georgina Kennedy | 11 | 11 | 10 | 11
(Malaysia) Rachel Arnold | 3 | 5 | 12 | 5
(Malaysia) Aira Azman | 11 | 11 | 10 | 14
(Wales) Lowri Roberts | 8 | 8 | 12 | 12
(Egypt) Malak Khafagy | 11 | 11 | 11
(England) Grace Gear | 6 | 4 | 5
(Hong Kong) Tong Tsz Wing | 9 | 5 | 7
9 | (Egypt) Rowan Elaraby | 11 | 11 | 11
14 | (Malaysia) Sivasangari Subramaniam | 11 | 11 | 11
(Latvia) Ineta Hopton | 6 | 8 | 8
(Canada) Nicole Bunyan | 9 | 3 | 11 | 4
Q | (United States) Caroline Fouts | 11 | 11 | 6 | 11
(France) Mélissa Alves | 11 | 9 | 11 | 11
(Egypt) Nour Aboulmakarim | 5 | 11 | 2 | 9
(England) Lucy Turmel | 4 | 6 | 5
2 | (Egypt) Hania El Hammamy | 11 | 11 | 11

Second round
6 | (England) Georgina Kennedy | 11 | 11 | 11
(Malaysia) Aira Azman | 6 | 3 | 6
(Egypt) Malak Khafagy | 5 | 4 | 5
9 | (Egypt) Rowan Elaraby | 11 | 11 | 11
14 | (Malaysia) Sivasangari Subramaniam | 11 | 11 | 11
Q | (United States) Caroline Fouts | 6 | 7 | 6
(France) Mélissa Alves | 3 | 4 | 7
2 | (Egypt) Hania El Hammamy | 11 | 11 | 11

Third Round
6 | (England) Georgina Kennedy | 11 | 11 | 4 | 4 | 7
9 | (Egypt) Rowan Elaraby | 7 | 5 | 11 | 11 | 11
14 | (Malaysia) Sivasangari Subramaniam | 13 | 6 | 5
2 | (Egypt) Hania El Hammamy | 15 | 11 | 11

Quarter finals
9 | (Egypt) Rowan Elaraby | 4 | 11 | 6 | 7
2 | (Egypt) Hania El Hammamy | 11 | 6 | 11 | 11

== Schedule ==
Times are Eastern European Summer Time (UTC+03:00). To the best of five games.

Abbreviations:

- NMEC - National Museum of Egyptian Civilization
- PHC - Palm Hills Club (glass court & courts 1, 2, 3, 4)

=== Round 1 ===
Thursday, 9 May

| Date | Court | Time | Player 1 | Player 2 | Score |
|---|---|---|---|---|---|
| 9 May | PHC, Court 1 | 12:00 | Tesni Murphy (WAL) | Énora Villard (FRA) | 11–6, 11–4, 11–0 |
| 9 May | PHC, Court 2 | 12:00 | Lee Ka Yi (HKG) | Amina Orfi (EGY) | 11–7, 11–3, 11–6 |
| 9 May | PHC, Court 3 | 12:00 | Amina El Rihany (EGY) | Millie Tomlinson (ENG) | 11–13, 11–7, 11–8, 11–7 |
| 9 May | PHC, Court 4 | 12:00 | Georgia Adderley (SCO) | Chan Sin Yuk (HKG) | 6–11, 9–11, 11–7, 11–7, 11–7 |
| 9 May | PHC, Court 1 | 13:30 | Danielle Ray (CAN) | Cindy Merlo (SUI) | 4–11, 11–7, 11–9, 12–14, 11–7 |
| 9 May | PHC, Court 2 | 13:30 | Hana Ramadan (EGY) | Alex Haydon (AUS) | 11–6, 12–10, 11–5 |
| 9 May | PHC, Court 3 | 13:30 | Aifa Azman (MYS) | Tinne Gilis (BEL) | 11–4, 11–3, 11–2 |
| 9 May | PHC, Court 4 | 13:30 | Nada Abbas (EGY) | Fayrouz Aboelkheir (EGY) | 11–8, 11–7, 11–9 |
| 9 May | PHC, Court 1 | 16:00 | Sarah-Jane Perry (ENG) | Jasmine Hutton (ENG) | 13–11, 7–11, 11–8, 11–8 |
| 9 May | PHC, Court 3 | 16:00 | Olivia Weaver (USA) | Haya Ali (EGY) | 11–4, 11–1, 11–1 |
| 9 May | PHC, Court 2 | 16:45 | Hollie Naughton (CAN) | Salma Hany (EGY) | 11–5, 11–4, 11–13, 9–11, 11–7 |
| 9 May | PHC, Court 4 | 16:45 | Torrie Malik (ENG) | Sana Ibrahim (EGY) | 11–5, 5–11, 11–3, 11–5 |
| 9 May | PHC, Court 1 | 17:30 | Menna Hamed (EGY) | Nardine Garas (EGY) | 5–11, 9–11, 12–10, 11–9, 11–8 |
| 9 May | PHC, Court 3 | 17:30 | Marta Domínguez (ESP) | Chan Yiwen (MYS) | 11–7, 11–7, 7–11, 11–8 |
| 9 May | PHC, Glass Court | 19:30 | Marina Stefanoni (USA) | Nele Gilis (BEL) | 11–7, 9–11, 11–4, 11–6 |
| 9 May | PHC, Glass Court | 21:00 | Nour El Sherbini (EGY) | Jessica Turnbull (AUS) | 11–0, 11–4, 11–4 |

——————————————————————————————————————————————————————————————————————————————————————————————————————————

Friday, 10 May

| Date | Court | Time | Player 1 | Player 2 | Score |
|---|---|---|---|---|---|
| 10 May | PHC, Court 1 | 12:00 | Kenzy Ayman (EGY) | Salma El Tayeb (EGY) | 12–10, 6–11, 11–8, 2–11, 11–8 |
| 10 May | PHC, Court 2 | 12:00 | Alicia Mead (ENG) | Sabrina Sobhy (USA) | 11–7, 11–4, 11–6 |
| 10 May | PHC, Court 3 | 12:00 | Mariam Metwally (EGY) | Zeina Mickawy (EGY) | 11–5, 5–11, 11–8, 11–7 |
| 10 May | PHC, Court 4 | 12:00 | Ainaa Amani (EGY) | Marie Stephan (FRA) | 10–12, 11–7, 12–10, 11–7 |
| 10 May | PHC, Court 1 | 13:30 | Sivasangari Subramaniam (MYS) | Ineta Hopton (LAT) | 11–6, 11–8, 11–8 |
| 10 May | PHC, Court 2 | 13:30 | Malak Khafagy (EGY) | Grace Gear (ENG) | 11–6, 11–4, 11–5 |
| 10 May | PHC, Court 3 | 13:30 | Tomato Ho (HKG) | Nour El Tayeb (EGY) | 11–3, 11–4, 11–2 |
| 10 May | PHC, Court 4 | 13:30 | Satomi Watanabe (JPN) | Emily Whitlock (WAL) | 14–12, 13–11, 11–8 |
| 10 May | PHC, Court 1 | 16:00 | Nicole Bunyan (CAN) | Caroline Fouts (USA) | 11–9, 11–3, 6–11, 11–4 |
| 10 May | PHC, Court 3 | 16:00 | Georgina Kennedy (ENG) | Rachel Arnold (MYS) | 11–3, 11–5, 10–12, 11–5 |
| 10 May | PHC, Court 2 | 16:45 | Tong Tsz Wing (HKG) | Rowan Elaraby (EGY) | 11–9, 11–5, 11–7 |
| 10 May | PHC, Court 4 | 16:45 | Hana Moataz (EGY) | Nadine Shahin (EGY) | 11–4, 11–9, 10–12, 11–9 |
| 10 May | PHC, Court 1 | 17:30 | Mélissa Alves (FRA) | Nour Aboulmakarim (EGY) | 11–5, 9–11, 11–2, 11–9 |
| 10 May | PHC, Court 3 | 17:30 | Aira Azman (MYS) | Lowri Roberts (WAL) | 11–8, 11–8, 10–12, 14–12 |
| 10 May | PHC, Glass Court | 19:30 | Nouran Gohar (EGY) | Emilia Soini (FIN) | 11–2, 11–2, 11–1 |
| 10 May | PHC, Glass Court | 21:00 | Lucy Turmel (ENG) | Hania El Hammamy (EGY) | 11–4, 11–6, 11–5 |

=== Round 2 ===
Saturday, 11 May

| Date | Court | Time | Player 1 | Player 2 | Score |
|---|---|---|---|---|---|
| 11 May | PHC, Court 2 | 12:00 | Tesni Murphy (WAL) | Amina Orfi (EGY) | 11–6, 11–4, 11–9 |
| 11 May | PHC, Court 3 | 12:00 | Sarah-Jane Perry (ENG) | Cindy Merlo (SUI) | 6–11, 11–7, 11–4, 11–8 |
| 11 May | PHC, Court 2 | 13:30 | Fayrouz Aboelkheir (EGY) | Chan Sin Yuk (HKG) | 11–7, 9–11, 11–7, 11–9 |
| 11 May | PHC, Court 3 | 13:30 | Amina El Rihany (EGY) | Tinne Gilis (BEL) | 11–6, 11–6, 11–3 |
| 11 May | PHC, Court 2 | 16:00 | Hana Ramadan (EGY) | Salma Hany (EGY) | 11–5, 11–5, 3–11, 11–5 |
| 11 May | PHC, Court 3 | 16:00 | Olivia Weaver (USA) | Marta Domínguez (ESP) | 11–2, 11–3, 11–2 |
| 11 May | PHC, Glass Court | 19:30 | Torrie Malik (ENG) | Nele Gilis (BEL) | 11–3, 11–7, 3–11, 11–7 |
| 11 May | PHC, Glass Court | 21:00 | Nour El Sherbini (EGY) | Menna Hamed (EGY) | 11–5, 11–3, 11–1 |

——————————————————————————————————————————————————————————————————————————————————————————————————————————

Sunday, 12 May

| Date | Court | Time | Player 1 | Player 2 | Score |
|---|---|---|---|---|---|
| 12 May | PHC, Court 2 | 12:00 | Kenzy Ayman (EGY) | Sabrina Sobhy (USA) | 11–4, 11–6, 11–1 |
| 12 May | PHC, Court 3 | 12:00 | Satomi Watanabe (JPN) | Marie Stephan (FRA) | 11–3, 11–2, 11–3 |
| 12 May | PHC, Court 2 | 13:30 | Sivasangari Subramaniam (MYS) | Caroline Fouts (USA) | 11–6, 11–7, 11–6 |
| 12 May | PHC, Court 3 | 13:00 | Mariam Metwally (EGY) | Nour El Tayeb (EGY) | 13–11, 11–4, 11–2 |
| 12 May | PHC, Court 2 | 16:00 | Malak Khafagy (EGY) | Rowan Elaraby (EGY) | 11–5, 11–4, 11–5 |
| 12 May | PHC, Court 3 | 16:00 | Georgina Kennedy (ENG) | Aira Azman (MYS) | 11–6, 11–3, 11–6 |
| 12 May | PHC, Glass Court | 19:30 | Nouran Gohar (EGY) | Hana Moataz (EGY) | 11–4, 9–11, 11–6, 11–2 |
| 12 May | PHC, Glass Court | 21:00 | Mélissa Alves (FRA) | Hania El Hammamy (EGY) | 11–3, 11–4, 11–7 |

=== Round 3 ===
Monday, 13 & Tuesday 14 May

| Date | Court | Time | Player 1 | Player 2 | Score |
|---|---|---|---|---|---|
| 13 May | Court NMEC | 19:00 | Fayrouz Aboelkheir (EGY) | Nele Gilis (BEL) | 11–8, 11–7, 7–11, 11–5 |
| 13 May | PHC, Glass Court | 19:30 | Olivia Weaver (USA) | Salma Hany (EGY) | 11–9, 11–5, 11–9 |
| 13 May | Court NMEC | 20:30 | Nour El Sherbini (EGY) | Amina Orfi (EGY) | 11–5, 12–10, 11–8 |
| 13 May | PHC, Glass Court | 21:00 | Sarah-Jane Perry (ENG) | Tinne Gilis (BEL) | 11–7, 11–7, 11–7 |
| 14 May | Court NMEC | 19:00 | Nouran Gohar (EGY) | Sabrina Sobhy (USA) | 11–3, 11–4, 11–1 |
| 14 May | PHC, Glass Court | 19:30 | Satomi Watanabe (JPN) | Nour El Tayeb (EGY) | 11–7, 12–10, 11–9 |
| 14 May | Court NMEC | 20:30 | Sivasangari Subramaniam (MYS) | Hania El Hammamy (EGY) | 15–13, 11–6, 11–5 |
| 14 May | PHC, Glass Court | 21:00 | Georgina Kennedy (ENG) | Rowan Elaraby (EGY) | 7–11, 5–11, 11–4, 11–4, 11–7 |

=== Quarter-finals ===
Thursday 15 & Friday 16 May

| Date | Court | Time | Player 1 | Player 2 | Score |
|---|---|---|---|---|---|
| 15 May | Court NMEC | 19:30 | Olivia Weaver (USA) | Fayrouz Aboelkheir (EGY) | 11–9, 11–6, 3–11, 11–3 |
| 15 May | Court NMEC | 21:00 | Nour El Sherbini (EGY) | Tinne Gilis (BEL) | 11–2, 11–8, 11–5 |
| 16 May | Court NMEC | 19:30 | Nouran Gohar (EGY) | Nour El Tayeb (EGY) | 11–3, 7–11, 11–4, 11–9 |
| 16 May | Court NMEC | 20:15 | Rowan Elaraby (EGY) | Hania El Hammamy (EGY) | 4–11, 11–6, 6–11, 7–11 |

=== Semi-finals ===
Friday, 17 May

| Date | Court | Time | Player 1 | Player 2 | Score |
|---|---|---|---|---|---|
| 17 May | Court NMEC | 19:30 | Nour El Sherbini (EGY) | Olivia Weaver (USA) | 7–11, 11–5, 6–11, 11–5, 11–5 |
| 17 May | Court NMEC | 21:00 | Nouran Gohar (EGY) | Hania El Hammamy (EGY) | 12–14, 11–2, 11–5, 11–7 |

=== Final ===
Saturday, 18 May

| Date | Court | Time | Player 1 | Player 2 | Score |
|---|---|---|---|---|---|
| 18 May | Court NMEC | 19:30 | Nour El Sherbini (EGY) | Nouran Gohar (EGY) | 8–11, 11–9, 7–11, 5–11 |

== Representation ==
This table shows the number of players by country in the 2024 PSA Men's World Championship. A total of 15 nationalities are represented. Egypt is the most represented nation with 23 players.

| | (Egypt) EGY | (United States) USA | (Belgium) BEL | (England) ENG | (Malaysia) MYS | (Japan) JPN | (France) FRA | (Hong Kong) HKG | (Wales) WAL | (Spain) ESP | (Canada) CAN | (Australia) AUS | (Finland) FIN | (Latvia) LAT | (Scotland) SCO | Total |
|---|---|---|---|---|---|---|---|---|---|---|---|---|---|---|---|---|
| Final | 2 | 0 | | | | | | | | | | | | | | 2 |
| Semi-final | 3 | 1 | 0 | | | | | | | | | | | | | 4 |
| Quarter-final | 6 | 1 | 1 | 0 | | | | | | | | | | | | 8 |
| Round 3 | 8 | 2 | 2 | 2 | 1 | 1 | 0 | | | | | | | | | 16 |
| Round 2 | 15 | 3 | 2 | 3 | 2 | 1 | 2 | 1 | 1 | 1 | 0 | | | | | 32 |
| Total | 23 | 4 | 2 | 8 | 6 | 1 | 3 | 4 | 3 | 1 | 3 | 2 | 1 | 1 | 1 | 64 |

== See also ==
- World Squash Championships
- 2024 PSA Men's World Squash Championship

| Preceded by Chicago (USA); 2023 | PSA World Championships; Cairo (Egypt); 2024 | Succeeded by Chicago (USA); 2025 |
