= 2023 PSA Women's World Squash Championship =

2023 women's edition of the World Squash Championships

2023 Women's World Championship
- 38th PSA Women's World Squash Championship
- Location: Chicago, United States
- Venue: University Club of Chicago; Chicago Union Station
- Date: 3–11 May 2023
- Website https://worldsquashchamps.com/
- Category: PSA World Championships
- Prize money: $500,000

Results
- Champion: (Egypt) Nour El Sherbini
- Runner-up: (Egypt) Nouran Gohar
- Semi-finalists: (Egypt) Hania El Hammamy (New Zealand) Joelle King

The 2023 PSA Women's World Squash Championship was the 2023 women's edition of the World Squash Championships, which served as the individual world championship for squash players. The event took place in Chicago, United States from 3 to 11 May 2023. It was the third time that Chicago hosted the PSA World Championships after 2018–19 & 2020–21 editions.

Top seeds Nº1 Nouran Gohar and N2º Nour El Sherbini met in the final, marking the 14th Gohar–El Sherbini PSA series final. El Sherbini who led the head to head in finals 10–3 won her seventh World Championship title (and fifth in a row). Gohar continues to look for an elusive first World Championship title after losing in 2021 and 2022 (both vs. El Sherbini).

== World ranking points/prize money ==
PSA also awards points towards World ranking. Points are awarded as follows:

PSA World Squash Championships		Ranking Points						
Rank	Prize money US$	Winner	Runner up	3/4	5/8	9/16	17/32	33/64
World Squash Championships	$550,000	3175	2090	1270	780	475	290	177.5

=== Prize money breakdown ===
Total prize money for the tournament is $1,000,000, $500,000 per gender. This is about a 1% prize fund decrease from previous World Championships (2021–22; $550,000 per gender).

Position (num. of players)		% breakdown	Prize money (Total: $500,000)
Winner	(1)	16%	$80,000
Runner-up	(1)	10%	$50,000
3/4	(2)	6%	$30,000
5/8	(4)	3.50%	$17,500
9/16	(8)	2%	$10,000
17/32	(16)	1%	$5,000
33/64	(32)	0.50%	$2,500

== Venues ==
University Club of Chicago and Chicago Union Station in Chicago are the two venues that will host the competition.

University Club of Chicago	Chicago Union Station
2023 PSA Women's World Squash Championship (Chicago metropolitan area)

== Seeds ==
Click on the seed number of a player to go to their draw section.

1. (Egypt) Nouran Gohar (runner-up)
2. (Egypt) Nour El Sherbini (champion)
3. (Egypt) Hania El Hammamy (semi finals)
4. (New Zealand) Joelle King (semi finals)
5. (United States) Amanda Sobhy (quarter finals)
6. (Egypt) Nour El Tayeb (quarter finals)
7. (United States) Olivia Fiechter (third round)
8. (Egypt) Rowan Elaraby (third round)

9. (England) Sarah-Jane Perry (third round)
10. (England) Georgina Kennedy (quarter finals)
11. (Belgium) Nele Gilis (quarter finals)
12. (Belgium) Tinne Gilis (third round)
13. (United States) Olivia Clyne (second round)
14. (Egypt) Salma Hany (third round)
15. (Wales) Tesni Evans (third round)
16. (United States) Sabrina Sobhy (third round)

== Draw and results ==
=== Key ===
- rtd. = Retired
- Q = Qualifier
- WC = Host wild card
- w/o = Walkover

=== Finals ===
Semi finals
1	(Egypt) Nouran Gohar	6	12	11	9	14
3	(Egypt) Hania El Hammamy	11	10	9	11	12
4	(New Zealand) Joelle King	8	6	11	4
2	(Egypt) Nour El Sherbini	11	11	6	11

Final
1	(Egypt) Nouran Gohar	6	4	10
2	(Egypt) Nour El Sherbini	11	11	12

2023 Women's PSA World Squash Championship winner
(Egypt)
Nour El Sherbini
Seventh title

=== Top half ===
==== Section 1 ====
First round
1	(Egypt) Nouran Gohar	11	11	11
(Egypt) Nour Aboulmakarim	4	4	3
(Egypt) Fayrouz Aboelkheir	11	11	11
Q	(Spain) Marta Domínguez	4	3	4
(Egypt) Salma El Tayeb	6	6	4
(Japan) Satomi Watanabe	11	11	11
(Spain) Cristina Gómez	2	0	7
12	(Belgium) Tinne Gilis	11	11	11
16	(United States) Sabrina Sobhy	11	11	11
(Hong Kong) Tong Tsz Wing	7	3	4
(Egypt) Hana Ramadan	11	11	5	11
(Malaysia) Rachel Arnold	6	5	11	7
(England) Jasmine Hutton	11	11	5	11
(South Africa) Alexandra Fuller	7	7	11	5
(Egypt) Sana Ibrahim	7	11	10	9
6	(Egypt) Nour El Tayeb	11	2	12	11

Second round
1	(Egypt) Nouran Gohar	11	11	11
(Egypt) Fayrouz Aboelkheir	4	9	2
(Japan) Satomi Watanabe	6	5	7
12	(Belgium) Tinne Gilis	11	11	11
16	(United States) Sabrina Sobhy	11	11	12
(Egypt) Hana Ramadan	5	6	10
(England) Jasmine Hutton	3	11	6	4
6	(Egypt) Nour El Tayeb	11	7	11	11

Third Round
1	(Egypt) Nouran Gohar	11	11	11
12	(Belgium) Tinne Gilis	6	4	7
16	(United States) Sabrina Sobhy	10	10	6
6	(Egypt) Nour El Tayeb	12	12	11

Quarter finals
1	(Egypt) Nouran Gohar	11	11	11
6	(Egypt) Nour El Tayeb	5	6	5

==== Section 2 ====
First round
5	(United States) Amanda Sobhy	11	11	11
(Hong Kong) Tomato Ho	2	3	5
(Canada) Hollie Naughton	5	11	11	10	11
(Egypt) Jana Shiha	11	7	5	12	6
(Hong Kong) Chan Sin Yuk	3	8	12
(Scotland) Georgia Adderley	11	11	14
Q	(Egypt) Malak Khafagy	11	4	7
14	(Egypt) Salma Hany	13	11	11
13	(United States) Olivia Clyne	12	11	11
(India) Joshna Chinappa	10	7	5
(Latvia) Ineta Mackeviča	6	6	3
(Egypt) Amina Orfi	11	11	11
(Egypt) Farida Mohamed	8	12	12	11
Q	(Malaysia) Ainaa Amani	11	10	10	9
(Egypt) Kenzy Ayman	1	9	7
3	(Egypt) Hania El Hammamy	11	11	11

Second round
5	(United States) Amanda Sobhy	11	11	11
(Canada) Hollie Naughton	4	5	3
(Scotland) Georgia Adderley	7	1	4
14	(Egypt) Salma Hany	11	11	11
13	(United States) Olivia Clyne	9	3	11	6
(Egypt) Amina Orfi	11	11	7	11
(Egypt) Farida Mohamed	15	11	6	7
3	(Egypt) Hania El Hammamy	17	8	11	11

Third Round
5	(United States) Amanda Sobhy	11	11	11
14	(Egypt) Salma Hany	6	5	3
(Egypt) Amina Orfi	5	5	11	11	9
3	(Egypt) Hania El Hammamy	11	11	5	7	11

Quarter finals
5	(United States) Amanda Sobhy	4	6	5
3	(Egypt) Hania El Hammamy	11	11	11

=== Bottom half ===
==== Section 3 ====
First round
4	(New Zealand) Joelle King	11	11	11
(France) Énora Villard	8	4	2
(Egypt) Zeina Mickawy	7	10	7
(England) Lucy Beecroft	11	12	11
(Malaysia) Aifa Azman	11	11	11
WC	(United States) Caroline Fouts	9	7	5
(England) Katie Malliff	6	4	5
15	(Wales) Tesni Evans	11	11	11
11	(Belgium) Nele Gilis	11	11	11
Q	(Egypt) Zeina Zein	6	4	3
(France) Mélissa Alves	9	11	8	11	11
Q	(Malaysia) Aira Azman	11	5	11	4	2
(Hong Kong) Lee Ka Yi	12	12	9	6
(Egypt) Yathreb Adel	10	14	11	11
(Egypt) Nada Abbas	7	3	4
7	(United States) Olivia Fiechter	11	11	11

Second round
4	(New Zealand) Joelle King	11	11	11
(England) Lucy Beecroft	5	8	7
(Malaysia) Aifa Azman	11	4	11	9	11
15	(Wales) Tesni Evans	5	11	5	11	13
11	(Belgium) Nele Gilis	12	12	11
(France) Mélissa Alves	10	10	8
(Egypt) Yathreb Adel	9	7	5^{r}
7	(United States) Olivia Fiechter	11	11	7

Third Round
4	(New Zealand) Joelle King	11	11	14
15	(Wales) Tesni Evans	8	4	12
11	(Belgium) Nele Gilis	9	13	11	9	11
7	(United States) Olivia Fiechter	11	11	7	11	8

Quarter finals
4	(New Zealand) Joelle King	11	11	11
11	(Belgium) Nele Gilis	9	8	7

==== Section 4 ====
First round
8	(Egypt) Rowan Elaraby	11	11	11
(England) Grace Gear	5	4	4
(United States) Marina Stefanoni	4	4	15	3
(Malaysia) Sivasangari Subramaniam	11	11	13	11
(England) Lucy Turmel	5	11	11	11
(Egypt) Mariam Metwally	11	6	8	6
(Wales) Emily Whitlock	5	4	8
10	(England) Georgina Kennedy	11	11	11
9	(England) Sarah-Jane Perry	11	10	11	9	11
(Egypt) Nadine Shahin	5	12	8	11	8
(England) Millie Tomlinson	11	5	8	7
(Canada) Nicole Bunyan	4	11	11	11
(France) Marie Stephan	11	11	8	11	11
Q	(Malaysia) Yasshmita Jadishkumar	13	4	11	7	8
(Egypt) Hana Moataz	4	2	6
2	(Egypt) Nour El Sherbini	11	11	11

Second round
8	(Egypt) Rowan Elaraby	11	11	11
(Malaysia) Sivasangari Subramaniam	9	5	2
(England) Lucy Turmel	3	2	4
10	(England) Georgina Kennedy	11	11	11
9	(England) Sarah-Jane Perry	11	11	11
(Canada) Nicole Bunyan	9	6	6
(France) Marie Stephan	8	3	6
2	(Egypt) Nour El Sherbini	11	11	11

Third Round
8	(Egypt) Rowan Elaraby	8	7	4
10	(England) Georgina Kennedy	11	11	11
9	(England) Sarah-Jane Perry	3	4	6
2	(Egypt) Nour El Sherbini	11	11	11

Quarter finals
10	(England) Georgina Kennedy	7	2	4
2	(Egypt) Nour El Sherbini	11	11	11

== Schedule ==
Times are Central Daylight Time (UTC−05:00). To the best of five games.

Abbreviations:

- UCC - University Club of Chicago
- CUS - Chicago Union Station.

=== Round 1 ===
Wednesday, 3 May

Date	Court	Time	Player 1	Player 2	Score
3 May	UCC, Court 1	11:00	Hana Ramadan (EGY)	Rachel Arnold (MYS)	11–6, 11–5, 5–11, 11–7
3 May	UCC, Court 2	11:00	Salma El Tayeb (EGY)	Satomi Watanabe (JPN)	11–6, 11–6, 11–4
3 May	UCC, Court 1	11:45	Sabrina Sobhy (USA)	Tong Tsz Wing (HKG)	11–7, 11–3, 11–4
3 May	UCC, Court 2	11:45	Cristina Gómez (ESP)	Tinne Gilis (BEL)	11–2, 11–0, 11–7
3 May	UCC, Court 3	11:45	Jasmine Hutton (ENG)	Alexandra Fuller (RSA)	11–7, 11–7, 5–11, 11–5
3 May	UCC, Court 3	12:30	Sana Ibrahim (EGY)	Nour El Tayeb (EGY)	11–7, 2–11, 12–10, 11–9
3 May	UCC, Court 1	14:00	Kenzy Ayman (EGY)	Hania El Hammamy (EGY)	11–1, 11–9, 11–7
3 May	UCC, Court 2	14:00	Chan Sin Yuk (HKG)	Georgia Adderley (SCO)	11–3, 11–8, 14–12
3 May	UCC, Court 1	14:45	Farida Mohamed (EGY)	Ainaa Amani (MYS)	8–11, 12–10, 12–10, 11–9
3 May	UCC, Court 2	14:45	Malak Khafagy (EGY)	Salma Hany (EGY)	13–11, 11–4, 11–7
3 May	UCC, Court 3	14:45	Fayrouz Aboelkheir (EGY)	Marta Domínguez (ESP)	11–4, 11–3, 11–4
3 May	UCC, Court 3	16:30	Hollie Naughton (CAN)	Jana Shiha (EGY)	5–11, 11–7, 11–5, 10–12, 11–6
3 May	UCC, Court 1	18:00	Nouran Gohar (EGY)	Nour Aboulmakarim (EGY)	11–4, 11–4, 11–3
3 May	UCC, Court 2	18:45	Ineta Mackeviča (LAT)	Amina Orfi (EGY)	11–6, 11–6, 11–3
3 May	UCC, Court 3	18:45	Amanda Sobhy (USA)	Tomato Ho (HKG)	11–2, 11–3, 11–5
3 May	UCC, Court 2	19:30	Olivia Clyne (USA)	Joshna Chinappa (IND)	12–10, 11–7, 11–5

——————————————————————————————————————————————————————————————————————————————————————————————————————————

Thursday, 4 May

Date	Court	Time	Player 1	Player 2	Score
4 May	UCC, Court 1	11:00	Zeina Mickawy (EGY)	Lucy Beecroft (ENG)	11–7, 12–10, 11–7
4 May	UCC, Court 2	11:00	Millie Tomlinson (ENG)	Nicole Bunyan (CAN)	4–11, 11–5, 11–8, 11–7
4 May	UCC, Court 1	11:45	Joelle King (NZL)	Énora Villard (FRA)	11–8, 11–4, 11–2
4 May	UCC, Court 2	11:45	Emily Whitlock (WAL)	Georgina Kennedy (ENG)	11–5, 11–4, 11–8
4 May	UCC, Court 3	11:45	Sarah-Jane Perry (ENG)	Nadine Shahin (EGY)	11–5, 10–12, 11–8, 9–11, 11–8
4 May	UCC, Court 3	12:30	Aifa Azman (MYS)	Caroline Fouts (USA)	11–9, 11–7, 11–5
4 May	UCC, Court 1	14:00	Lee Ka Yi (HKG)	Yathreb Adel (EGY)	10–12, 14–12, 11–9, 11–6
4 May	UCC, Court 2	14:00	Marie Stephan (FRA)	Yasshmita Jadishkumar (MYS)	11–13, 11–4, 8–11, 11–7, 11–8
4 May	UCC, Court 1	14:45	Hana Moataz (EGY)	Nour El Sherbini (EGY)	11–4, 11–2, 11–6
4 May	UCC, Court 2	14:45	Lucy Turmel (ENG)	Mariam Metwally (EGY)	5–11, 11–6, 11–8, 11–6
4 May	UCC, Court 3	14:45	Katie Malliff (ENG)	Tesni Evans (WAL)	11–6, 11–4, 11–5
4 May	UCC, Court 3	16:30	Rowan Elaraby (EGY)	Grace Gear (ENG)	11–5, 11–4, 11–4
4 May	UCC, Court 1	18:00	Nada Abbas (EGY)	Olivia Fiechter (USA)	11–7, 11–3, 11–4
4 May	UCC, Court 2	18:45	Mélissa Alves (FRA)	Aira Azman (MYS)	9–11, 11–5, 8–11, 11–4, 11–2
4 May	UCC, Court 3	18:45	Marina Stefanoni (USA)	Sivasangari Subramaniam (MYS)	11–4, 11–4, 13–15, 11–3
4 May	UCC, Court 2	19:30	Nele Gilis (BEL)	Zeina Zein (EGY)	11–6, 11–4, 11–3

=== Round 2 ===
Friday, 5 May

Date	Court	Time	Player 1	Player 2	Score
5 May	CUS, Glass Court	12:00	Marie Stephan (FRA)	Nour El Sherbini (EGY)	11–8, 11–3, 11–6
5 May	UCC, Court 1	12:00	Sabrina Sobhy (USA)	Hana Ramadan (EGY)	11–5, 11–6, 12–10
5 May	UCC, Court 2	12:00	Satomi Watanabe (JPN)	Tinne Gilis (BEL)	11–6, 11–5, 11–7
5 May	UCC, Court 3	12:00	Jasmine Hutton (ENG)	Nour El Tayeb (EGY)	11–3, 7–11, 11–6, 11–4
5 May	UCC, Court 1	12:45	Farida Mohamed (EGY)	Hania El Hammamy (EGY)	17–15, 8–11, 11–6, 11–7
5 May	UCC, Court 2	12:45	Georgia Adderley (SCO)	Salma Hany (EGY)	11–7, 11–1, 11–4
5 May	UCC, Court 3	12:45	Sarah-Jane Perry (ENG)	Nicole Bunyan (CAN)	11–9, 11–6, 11–6
5 May	CUS, Glass Court	14:00	Nouran Gohar (EGY)	Fayrouz Aboelkheir (EGY)	11–4, 11–9, 11–2
5 May	UCC, Court 1	16:00	Joelle King (NZL)	Lucy Beecroft (ENG)	11–5, 11–8, 11–7
5 May	UCC, Court 2	16:00	Lucy Turmel (ENG)	Georgina Kennedy (ENG)	11–3, 11–2, 11–4
5 May	UCC, Court 3	16:00	Aifa Azman (MYS)	Tesni Evans (WAL)	5–11, 11–4, 5–11, 11–9, 13–11
5 May	UCC, Court 1	16:45	Yathreb Adel (EGY)	Olivia Fiechter (USA)	11–9, 11–7, 7–5
5 May	UCC, Court 2	16:45	Nele Gilis (BEL)	Mélissa Alves (FRA)	12–10, 12–10, 11–8
5 May	UCC, Court 3	16:45	Rowan Elaraby (EGY)	Sivasangari Subramaniam (MYS)	11–9, 11–5, 11–2
5 May	CUS, Glass Court	17:30	Amanda Sobhy (USA)	Hollie Naughton (CAN)	11–4, 11–5, 11–3
5 May	CUS, Glass Court	20:00	Olivia Clyne (USA)	Amina Orfi (EGY)	11–9, 11–3, 7–11, 11–6

=== Round 3 ===
Saturday, 6 & Sunday 7 May

Date	Court	Time	Player 1	Player 2	Score
6 May	CUS, Glass Court	12:00	Nouran Gohar (EGY)	Tinne Gilis (BEL)	11–6, 11–4, 11–7
6 May	CUS, Glass Court	14:00	Sabrina Sobhy (USA)	Nour El Tayeb (EGY)	12–10, 12–10, 11–6
6 May	CUS, Glass Court	17:30	Amanda Sobhy (USA)	Salma Hany (EGY)	11–6, 11–5, 11–3
6 May	CUS, Glass Court	20:00	Amina Orfi (EGY)	Hania El Hammamy (EGY)	11–5, 11–5, 5–11, 7–11, 11–9
7 May	CUS, Glass Court	12:00	Rowan Elaraby (EGY)	Georgina Kennedy (ENG)	11–8, 11–7, 11–4
7 May	CUS, Glass Court	14:00	Sarah-Jane Perry (ENG)	Nour El Sherbini (EGY)	11–3, 11–4, 11–6
7 May	CUS, Glass Court	16:30	Joelle King (NZL)	Tesni Evans (WAL)	11–8, 11–4, 14–12
7 May	CUS, Glass Court	19:00	Nele Gilis (BEL)	Olivia Fiechter (USA)	9–11, 13–11, 11–7, 9–11, 11–8

=== Quarter-finals ===
Monday, 8 & Tuesday 9 May

Date	Court	Time	Player 1	Player 2	Score
8 May	CUS, Glass Court	17:30	Nouran Gohar (EGY)	Nour El Tayeb (EGY)	11–5, 11–6, 11–5
8 May	CUS, Glass Court	20:00	Amanda Sobhy (USA)	Hania El Hammamy (EGY)	11–4, 11–6, 11–5
9 May	CUS, Glass Court	17:30	Georgina Kennedy (ENG)	Nour El Sherbini (EGY)	11–7, 11–2, 11–4
9 May	CUS, Glass Court	20:00	Joelle King (NZL)	Nele Gilis (BEL)	11–9, 11–8, 11–7

=== Semi-finals ===
Wednesday, 10 May

Date	Court	Time	Player 1	Player 2	Score
10 May	CUS, Glass Court	17:30	Nouran Gohar (EGY)	Hania El Hammamy (EGY)	6–11, 12–10, 11–9, 9–11, 14–12
10 May	CUS, Glass Court	20:00	Joelle King (NZL)	Nour El Sherbini (EGY)	11–8, 11–6, 6–11, 11–4

=== Final ===
Thursday, 11 May

Date	Court	Time	Player 1	Player 2	Score
11 May	CUS, Glass Court	19:00	Nouran Gohar (EGY)	Nour El Sherbini (EGY)	11–6, 11–4, 12–10

== Representation ==
This table shows the number of players by country in the 2023 PSA Women's World Championship. A total of 16 nationalities are represented. Egypt is the most represented nation with 24 players.

	(Egypt) EGY	(New Zealand) NZL	(England) ENG	(United States) USA	(Belgium) BEL	(Wales) WAL	(Malaysia) MYS	(France) FRA	(Canada) CAN	(Japan) JPN	(Scotland) SCO	(Hong Kong) HKG	(Spain) ESP	(India) IND	(Latvia) LAT	(South Africa) RSA	Total
Final	2	0															2
Semi-final	3	1	0														4
Quarter-final	4	1	1	1	1	0											8
Round 3	7	1	2	3	2	1	0										16
Round 2	11	1	5	4	2	1	2	2	2	1	1	0					32
Total	24	1	8	6	2	2	6	3	2	1	1	4	2	1	1	1	64

== See also ==
- World Squash Championships
- 2023 PSA Men's World Squash Championship

Preceded by Cairo (Egypt); 2022	PSA World Championships; Chicago (USA); 2023	Succeeded by Cairo (Egypt); 2024
