= 2023 PSA Men's World Squash Championship =

Squash tournament in Chicago

2023 Men's World Championship
- 44th PSA Men's World Squash Championship
- Location: Chicago, United States
- Venue: University Club of Chicago; Chicago Union Station
- Date: 3–11 May 2023
- Website https://worldsquashchamps.com/
- Category: PSA World Championships
- Prize money: $500,000

Results
- Champion: (Egypt) Ali Farag
- Runner-up: (Egypt) Karim Abdel Gawad
- Semi-finalists: (England) Mohamed El Shorbagy (Egypt) Mostafa Asal

The 2023 PSA Men's World Squash Championship was the 2023 men's edition of the World Squash Championships, which served as the individual world championship for squash players. The event took place in Chicago, United States, from 3 to 11 May 2023. It was the third time that Chicago hosted the PSA World Championships after 2018–19 & 2020–21 editions.

Seeded Nº3 Ali Farag defeated unseeded Karim Abdel Gawad for the World Championship title. Gawad became the first unseeded player to reach the final since Rodney Martin in 1991. It was Farag's fourth World Championship title, having previously won in 2019, 2021 and 2022.

== World ranking points/prize money ==
PSA also awards points towards World ranking. Points are awarded as follows:

PSA World Squash Championships		Ranking Points						
Rank	Prize money US$	Winner	Runner up	3/4	5/8	9/16	17/32	33/64
World Squash Championships	$550,000	3175	2090	1270	780	475	290	177.5

=== Prize money breakdown ===
Total prize money for the tournament is $1,000,000, $500,000 per gender. This is about a 10% prize fund decrease from previous World Championships (2021–22; $550,000 per gender).

Position (num. of players)		% breakdown	Prize money (Total: $500,000)
Winner	(1)	16%	$80,000
Runner-up	(1)	10%	$50,000
3/4	(2)	6%	$30,000
5/8	(4)	3.50%	$17,500
9/16	(8)	2%	$10,000
17/32	(16)	1%	$5,000
33/64	(32)	0.50%	$2,500

== Venues ==
University Club of Chicago and Chicago Union Station in Chicago are the two venues that hosted the competition.

University Club of Chicago	Chicago Union Station
2023 PSA Men's World Squash Championship (Chicago metropolitan area)

== Seeds ==
Click on the seed number of a player to go to their draw section.

1. (Egypt) Mostafa Asal (semi finals)
2. (Peru) Diego Elías (quarter finals)
3. (England) Mohamed El Shorbagy (semi finals)
4. (Egypt) Ali Farag (champion)
5. (New Zealand) Paul Coll (quarter finals)
6. (Egypt) Marwan El Shorbagy (third round)
7. (Egypt) Tarek Momen (quarter finals)
8. (France) Victor Crouin (second round)

9. (Egypt) Mazen Hesham (quarter finals)
10. (Egypt) Fares Dessouky (second round)
11. (Wales) Joel Makin (third round)
12. (Egypt) Youssef Soliman (first round)
13. (Colombia) Miguel Á Rodríguez (third round)
14. (Switzerland) Nicolas Müller (first round)
15. (France) Grégoire Marche (second round)
16. (India) Saurav Ghosal (third round)

== Draw and results ==
=== Key ===
- rtd. = Retired
- Q = Qualifier
- WC = Host wild card
- w/o = Walkover

=== Finals ===
Semi finals
1	(Egypt) Mostafa Asal	5	8	13	2
4	(Egypt) Ali Farag	11	11	11	11
3	(England) Mohamed El Shorbagy	12	5	11	8	7
(Egypt) Karim Abdel Gawad	10	11	7	11	11

Final
4	(Egypt) Ali Farag	12	11	11
(Egypt) Karim Abdel Gawad	10	6	6

2023 Men's PSA World Squash Championship winner
(Egypt)
Ali Farag
Fourth title

=== Top half ===
==== Section 1 ====
First round
1	(Egypt) Mostafa Asal	11	11	12
(Argentina) Leandro Romiglio	5	5	10
(Hungary) Balázs Farkas	6	5	9
(Egypt) Omar Mosaad	11	11	11
(Scotland) Rory Stewart	11	11	12
Q	(France) Edwin Clain	7	7	10
(Mexico) César Salazar	3	2^{r}
11	(Wales) Joel Makin	11	4
9	(Egypt) Mazen Hesham	11	11	11
(France) Lucas Serme	5	4	4
(Hong Kong) Alex Lau	11	11	7	8
(Egypt) Karim El Hammamy	13	5	11	11
(England) Nick Wall	6	6	10
(Egypt) Aly Abou Eleinen	11	11	12
(Spain) Bernat Jaume	6	5	4
8	(France) Victor Crouin	11	11	11

Second round
1	(Egypt) Mostafa Asal	8	11	11	8	11
(Egypt) Omar Mosaad	11	4	6	11	8
(Scotland) Rory Stewart	6	6	5
11	(Wales) Joel Makin	11	11	11
9	(Egypt) Mazen Hesham	11	11	11
(Egypt) Karim El Hammamy	5	3	7
(Egypt) Aly Abou Eleinen	12	11	1	11	11
8	(France) Victor Crouin	14	7	11	4	9

Third Round
1	(Egypt) Mostafa Asal	12	11	9	11
11	(Wales) Joel Makin	10	6	11	5
9	(Egypt) Mazen Hesham	11	8	11	11
(Egypt) Aly Abou Eleinen	9	11	9	7

Quarter finals
1	(Egypt) Mostafa Asal	11	3	11	5	12
9	(Egypt) Mazen Hesham	9	11	6	11	10

==== Section 2 ====
First round
5	(New Zealand) Paul Coll	11	11	11
(United States) Faraz Khan	7	2	9
(Colombia) Juan Camilo Vargas	12	11	11
(India) Mahesh Mangaonkar	10	8	5
(England) Patrick Rooney	11	11	11
Q	(Malaysia) Ivan Yuen	9	5	8
(United States) Todd Harrity	8	7	6
13	(Colombia) Miguel Á Rodríguez	11	11	11
15	(France) Grégoire Marche	11	11	11
(Egypt) Mohamed ElSherbini	6	6	5
(England) Nathan Lake	11	11	11	11	11
Q	(England) Curtis Malik	9	13	13	4	9
(Netherlands) Rowan Damming	3	4	5
(England) Adrian Waller	11	11	11
(India) Ramit Tandon	12	4	3
4	(Egypt) Ali Farag	14	11	11

Second round
5	(New Zealand) Paul Coll	12	11	11
(Colombia) Juan Camilo Vargas	10	6	9
(England) Patrick Rooney	11	5	6	6
13	(Colombia) Miguel Á Rodríguez	8	11	11	11
15	(France) Grégoire Marche	12	9	3	3
(England) Nathan Lake	10	11	11	11
(England) Adrian Waller	6	7	5
4	(Egypt) Ali Farag	11	11	11

Third Round
5	(New Zealand) Paul Coll	11	11	13
13	(Colombia) Miguel Á Rodríguez	8	5	11
(England) Nathan Lake	9	1	11	3
4	(Egypt) Ali Farag	11	11	9	11

Quarter finals
5	(New Zealand) Paul Coll	3	11	2	4
4	(Egypt) Ali Farag	11	5	11	11

=== Bottom half ===
==== Section 3 ====
First round
3	(England) Mohamed El Shorbagy	11	11	11
(United States) Timothy Brownell	7	9	7
(Malaysia) Ng Eain Yow	11	11	11
Q	(India) Abhay Singh	2	5	6
(Egypt) Youssef Ibrahim	11	11	11
Q	(England) Simon Herbert	8	4	5
(Scotland) Greg Lobban	11	11	11
14	(Switzerland) Nicolas Müller	2	6	9
10	(Egypt) Fares Dessouky	11	11	11
(Canada) David Baillargeon	8	7	6
(England) George Parker	6	10	9
Q	(Egypt) Mohamed Abouelghar	11	12	11
(France) Sébastien Bonmalais	11	4	11	2	9
(Mexico) Leonel Cárdenas	9	11	4	11	11
(England) Charlie Lee	13	6	10
7	(Egypt) Tarek Momen	15	11	12

Second round
3	(England) Mohamed El Shorbagy	4	11	11	11
(Malaysia) Eain Yow	11	7	6	9
(Egypt) Youssef Ibrahim	11	8	13	11
(Scotland) Greg Lobban	6	11	11	7
10	(Egypt) Fares Dessouky	9	11	3	7
Q	(Egypt) Mohamed Abouelghar	11	6	11	11
(Mexico) Leonel Cárdenas	11	5	12	3	2
7	(Egypt) Tarek Momen	9	11	10	11	11

Third Round
3	(England) Mohamed El Shorbagy	11	11	11
(Egypt) Youssef Ibrahim	7	9	9
Q	(Egypt) Mohamed Abouelghar	11	11	10	11	6
7	(Egypt) Tarek Momen	4	13	12	9	11

Quarter finals
3	(England) Mohamed El Shorbagy	11	9	13	8	11
7	(Egypt) Tarek Momen	8	11	11	11	3

==== Section 4 ====
First round
6	(Egypt) Marwan El Shorbagy	12	7	11	11
(United States) Shahjahan Khan	10	11	9	8
(Portugal) Rui Soares	6	8	6
(France) Auguste Dussourd	11	11	11
(Spain) Iker Pajares	6	8	2
(Switzerland) Dimitri Steinmann	11	11	11
(Egypt) Karim Abdel Gawad	11	11	11
12	(Egypt) Youssef Soliman	7	7	7
16	(India) Saurav Ghosal	5	11	11	11	11
(Egypt) Yahya Elnawasany	11	6	13	6	3
(Hong Kong) Henry Leung	11	11	9	9	15
(England) James Willstrop	6	7	11	11	13
WC	(United States) Andrew Douglas	8	7	11
(France) Baptiste Masotti	11	11	13
(Germany) Raphael Kandra	9	7	4
2	(Peru) Diego Elías	11	11	11

Second round
6	(Egypt) Marwan El Shorbagy	11	12	8	11
(France) Auguste Dussourd	6	10	11	7
(Switzerland) Dimitri Steinmann	5	10	3
(Egypt) Karim Abdel Gawad	11	12	11
16	(India) Saurav Ghosal	11	13	11
(Hong Kong) Henry Leung	1	11	9
(France) Baptiste Masotti	5	7	4
2	(Peru) Diego Elías	11	11	11

Third Round
6	(Egypt) Marwan El Shorbagy	7	3	9
(Egypt) Karim Abdel Gawad	11	11	11
16	(India) Saurav Ghosal	11	11	6	3	10
2	(Peru) Diego Elías	9	4	11	11	12

Quarter finals
(Egypt) Karim Abdel Gawad	11	13	14
2	(Peru) Diego Elías	5	11	12

== Schedule ==
Times are Central Daylight Time (UTC−05:00). To the best of five games.

Abbreviations:

- UCC - University Club of Chicago
- CUS - Chicago Union Station.

=== Round 1 ===
Wednesday, 3 May

Date	Court	Time	Player 1	Player 2	Score
3 May	UCC, Court 1	12:30	Grégoire Marche (FRA)	Mohamed ElSherbini (EGY)	11–6, 11–6, 11–5
3 May	UCC, Court 2	12:30	Alex Lau (HKG)	Karim El Hammamy (EGY)	13–11, 5–11, 11–7, 11–8
3 May	UCC, Court 1	13:15	Nathan Lake (ENG)	Curtis Malik (ENG)	11–9, 11–13, 11–13, 11–4, 11–9
3 May	UCC, Court 2	13:15	Mazen Hesham (EGY)	Lucas Serme (FRA)	11–5, 11–4, 11–4
3 May	UCC, Court 3	13:15	Bernat Jaume (ESP)	Victor Crouin (FRA)	11–6, 11–5, 11–4
3 May	UCC, Court 3	14:00	Nick Wall (ENG)	Aly Abou Eleinen (EGY)	11–6, 11–6, 12–10
3 May	UCC, Court 1	16:30	Juan Camilo Vargas (COL)	Mahesh Mangaonkar (IND)	12–10, 11–8, 11–5
3 May	UCC, Court 2	16:30	Todd Harrity (USA)	Miguel Á Rodríguez (COL)	11–8, 11–7, 11–6
3 May	UCC, Court 1	17:15	Paul Coll (NZL)	Faraz Khan (USA)	11–7, 11–2, 11–9
3 May	UCC, Court 2	17:15	Patrick Rooney (ENG)	Ivan Yuen (MYS)	11–9, 11–5, 11–8
3 May	UCC, Court 3	17:15	Rory Stewart (SCO)	Edwin Clain (FRA)	11–7, 11–7, 12–10
3 May	UCC, Court 2	18:00	Rowan Damming (NED)	Adrian Waller (ENG)	11–3, 11–4, 11–5
3 May	UCC, Court 3	18:00	Balázs Farkas (HUN)	Omar Mosaad (EGY)	11–6, 11–5, 11–9
3 May	UCC, Court 1	18:45	Mostafa Asal (EGY)	Leandro Romiglio (ARG)	11–5, 11–5, 12–10
3 May	UCC, Court 1	19:30	Ramit Tandon (IND)	Ali Farag (EGY)	14–12, 11–4, 11–3
3 May	UCC, Court 3	19:30	César Salazar (MEX)	Joel Makin (WAL)	11–3, 4–2^{r.}

——————————————————————————————————————————————————————————————————————————————————————————————————————————

Thursday, 4 May

Date	Court	Time	Player 1	Player 2	Score
4 May	UCC, Court 1	12:45	Sébastien Bonmalais (FRA)	Leonel Cárdenas (MEX)	9–11, 11–4, 4–11, 11–2, 11–9
4 May	UCC, Court 2	14:45	George Parker (ENG)	Mohamed Abouelghar (EGY)	11–6, 12–10, 11–9
4 May	UCC, Court 1	13:15	Charlie Lee (ENG)	Tarek Momen (EGY)	15–13, 11–6, 12–10
4 May	UCC, Court 2	13:15	Fares Dessouky (EGY)	David Baillargeon (CAN)	11–8, 11–7, 11–6
4 May	UCC, Court 3	13:15	Youssef Ibrahim (EGY)	Simon Herbert (ENG)	11–8, 11–4, 11–5
4 May	UCC, Court 3	14:00	Greg Lobban (SCO)	Nicolas Müller (SUI)	11–2, 11–6, 11–9
4 May	UCC, Court 1	16:30	Rui Soares (POR)	Auguste Dussourd (FRA)	11–6, 11–8, 11–6
4 May	UCC, Court 2	16:30	Andrew Douglas (USA)	Baptiste Masotti (FRA)	11–8, 11–7, 13–11
4 May	UCC, Court 1	17:15	Raphael Kandra (GER)	Diego Elías (PER)	11–9, 11–7, 11–4
4 May	UCC, Court 2	17:15	Saurav Ghosal (IND)	Yahya Elnawasany (EGY)	5–11, 11–6, 11–13, 11–6, 11–3
4 May	UCC, Court 3	17:15	Iker Pajares (ESP)	Dimitri Steinmann (SUI)	11–6, 11–8, 11–2
4 May	UCC, Court 2	18:00	Henry Leung (HKG)	James Willstrop (ENG)	11–6, 11–7, 9–11, 9–11, 15–13
4 May	UCC, Court 3	18:00	Karim Abdel Gawad (EGY)	Youssef Soliman (EGY)	11–7, 11–7, 11–7
4 May	UCC, Court 1	18:45	Marwan El Shorbagy (EGY)	Shahjahan Khan (USA)	12–10, 7–11, 11–9, 11–8
4 May	UCC, Court 1	19:30	Mohamed El Shorbagy (ENG)	Timothy Brownell (USA)	11–7, 11–9, 11–7
4 May	UCC, Court 3	19:30	Eain Yow (MYS)	Abhay Singh (IND)	11–2, 11–5, 11–6

=== Round 2 ===
Friday, 5 May

Date	Court	Time	Player 1	Player 2	Score
5 May	CUS, Glass Court	12:45	Adrian Waller (ENG)	Ali Farag (EGY)	11–6, 11–7, 11–5
5 May	UCC, Court 1	13:30	Saurav Ghosal (IND)	Henry Leung (HKG)	11–1, 13–11, 11–9
5 May	UCC, Court 2	13:30	Dimitri Steinmann (SUI)	Karim Abdel Gawad (EGY)	11–5, 12–10, 11–3
5 May	UCC, Court 3	13:30	Youssef Ibrahim (EGY)	Greg Lobban (SCO)	11–6, 8–11, 13–11, 11–7
5 May	UCC, Court 1	14:15	Marwan El Shorbagy (EGY)	Auguste Dussourd (FRA)	11–6, 12–10, 8–11, 11–7
5 May	UCC, Court 2	14:15	Fares Dessouky (EGY)	Mohamed Abouelghar (EGY)	11–9, 6–11, 11–3, 11–7
5 May	UCC, Court 3	14:15	Leonel Cárdenas (MEX)	Tarek Momen (EGY)	9–11, 11–5, 10–12, 11–3, 11–2
5 May	CUS, Glass Court	14:45	Baptiste Masotti (FRA)	Diego Elías (PER)	11–5, 11–7, 11–4
5 May	UCC, Court 1	17:30	Aly Abou Eleinen (EGY)	Victor Crouin (FRA)	12–14, 11–7, 1–11, 11–4, 11–9
5 May	UCC, Court 2	17:30	Mazen Hesham (EGY)	Karim El Hammamy (EGY)	11–5, 11–3, 11–7
5 May	UCC, Court 3	17:30	Rory Stewart (SCO)	Joel Makin (WAL)	11–6, 11–6, 11–5
5 May	UCC, Court 1	18:15	Paul Coll (NZL)	Juan Camilo Vargas (COL)	12–10, 11–6, 11–9
5 May	UCC, Court 2	18:15	Grégoire Marche (FRA)	Nathan Lake (ENG)	10–12, 11–9, 11–3, 11–3
5 May	UCC, Court 3	18:15	Patrick Rooney (ENG)	Miguel Á Rodríguez (COL)	8–11, 11–5, 11–6, 11–6
5 May	CUS, Glass Court	18:30	Mostafa Asal (EGY)	Omar Mosaad (EGY)	8–11, 11–4, 11–6, 8–11, 11–8
5 May	CUS, Glass Court	21:00	Mohamed El Shorbagy (ENG)	Eain Yow (MYS)	4–11, 11–7, 11–6, 11–9

=== Round 3 ===
Saturday, 6 & Sunday 7 May

Date	Court	Time	Player 1	Player 2	Score
6 May	CUS, Glass Court	12:45	Nathan Lake (ENG)	Ali Farag (EGY)	11–9, 11–1, 9–11, 11–3
6 May	CUS, Glass Court	14:45	Paul Coll (NZL)	Miguel Á Rodríguez (COL)	11–8, 11–5, 13–11
6 May	CUS, Glass Court	18:30	Mostafa Asal (EGY)	Joel Makin (WAL)	12–10, 11–6, 9–11, 11–5
6 May	CUS, Glass Court	21:00	Mazen Hesham (EGY)	Aly Abou Eleinen (EGY)	11–9, 8–11, 11–9, 11–7
7 May	CUS, Glass Court	12:45	Mohamed El Shorbagy (ENG)	Youssef Ibrahim (EGY)	11–7, 11–9, 11–9
7 May	CUS, Glass Court	14:45	Mohamed Abouelghar (EGY)	Tarek Momen (EGY)	4–11, 13–11, 12–10, 9–11, 11–6
7 May	CUS, Glass Court	17:30	Saurav Ghosal (IND)	Diego Elías (PER)	9–11, 4–11, 11–6, 11–3, 12–10
7 May	CUS, Glass Court	20:00	Marwan El Shorbagy (EGY)	Karim Abdel Gawad (EGY)	11–7, 11–3, 11–9

=== Quarter-finals ===
Monday, 8 & Tuesday 9 May

Date	Court	Time	Player 1	Player 2	Score
8 May	CUS, Glass Court	18:30	Mostafa Asal (EGY)	Mazen Hesham (EGY)	11–9, 3–11, 11–6, 5–11, 12–10
8 May	CUS, Glass Court	21:00	Paul Coll (NZL)	Ali Farag (EGY)	11–3, 5–11, 11–2, 11–4
9 May	CUS, Glass Court	18:30	Karim Abdel Gawad (EGY)	Diego Elías (PER)	11–5, 13–11, 14–12
9 May	CUS, Glass Court	21:00	Mohamed El Shorbagy (ENG)	Tarek Momen (EGY)	11–8, 9–11, 13–11, 8–11, 11–3

=== Semi-finals ===
Wednesday, 10 May

Date	Court	Time	Player 1	Player 2	Score
10 May	CUS, Glass Court	Following women's semi-final 1	Mostafa Asal (EGY)	Ali Farag (EGY)	11–5, 11–8, 11–13, 11–2
10 May	CUS, Glass Court	Following women's semi-final 2	Mohamed El Shorbagy (ENG)	Karim Abdel Gawad (EGY)	10–12, 11–5, 7–11, 11–8, 11–7

=== Final ===
Thursday, 11 May

Date	Court	Time	Player 1	Player 2	Score
11 May	CUS, Glass Court	Following women's final	Ali Farag (EGY)	Karim Abdel Gawad (EGY)	12–10, 11–6, 11–6

== Representation ==
This table shows the number of players by country in the 2023 PSA Men's World Championship. A total of 21 nationalities are represented. Egypt is the most represented nation with 15 players.

	(Egypt) EGY	(England) ENG	(New Zealand) NZL	(Peru) PER	(Colombia) COL	(India) IND	(Wales) WAL	(France) FRA	(Scotland) SCO	(Hong Kong) HKG	(Malaysia) MYS	(Mexico) MEX	(Switzerland) SUI	(United States) USA	(Spain) ESP	(Argentina) ARG	(Canada) CAN	(Germany) GER	(Hungary) HUN	(Netherlands) NED	(Portugal) POR	Total
Final	2	0																				2
Semi-final	3	1	0																			4
Quarter-final	5	1	1	1	0																	8
Round 3	9	2	1	1	1	1	1	0														16
Round 2	12	4	1	1	2	1	1	4	2	1	1	1	1	0								32
Total	15	10	1	1	2	1	1	7	2	2	2	2	2	5	2	1	1	1	1	1	1	64

== See also ==
- World Squash Championships
- 2023 PSA Women's World Squash Championship

Preceded by Cairo (Egypt); 2022	PSA World Championships; Chicago (USA); 2023	Succeeded by Cairo (Egypt); 2024
