= Ali Loke =

Welsh squash player (born 1993)

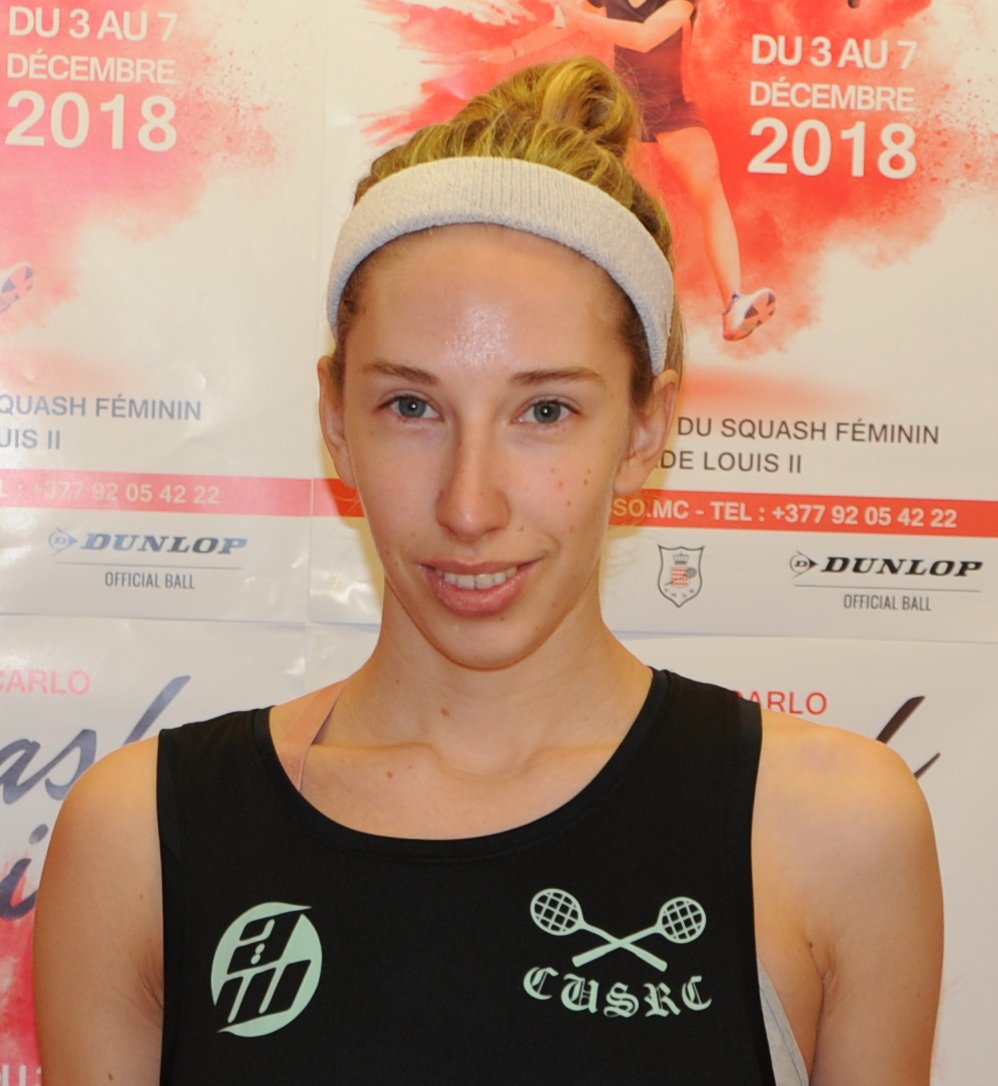
- Ali Loke, Monte Carlo Squash Classic 2018

Personal information
- Born: 26 May 1993 (age 33) Stevenage, England
- Height: 170 cm (5 ft 7 in)
- Weight: 62 kg (137 lb)
- Website: alilokesquash.com

Sport
- Country: Wales
- Coached by: Richard Loke
- Retired: Active
- Racquet used: Karakal

Women's singles
- Highest ranking: 76 (April 2019)
- Current ranking: 79 (August 2020)
- Updated on March 2019

Ali Loke (née Hemingway) (born 26 May 1993 in Stevenage) is a Welsh professional squash player. She has competed in the main draw of multiple professional PSA tournaments. As of April 2019, she was ranked number 77 in the world and was the 2nd-highest internationally ranked player in Wales.
