= Nele Coll =

Belgian squash player (born 1996)

Nele Coll (née Gillis)
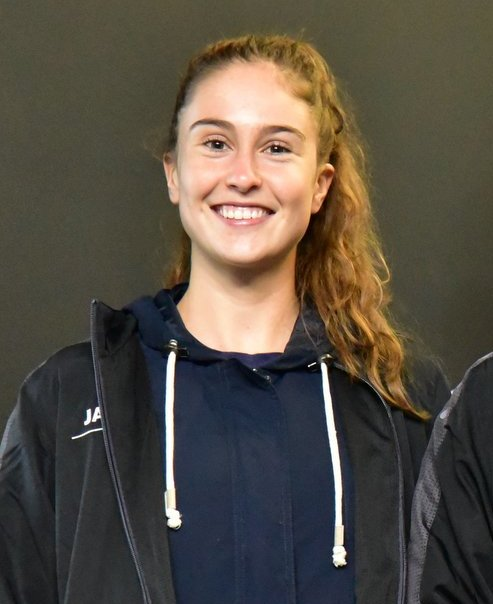
- Nele Gillis in 2017

Personal information
- Born: 20 February 1996 (age 30) Mol, Belgium
- Height: 158 cm (5 ft 2 in)
- Weight: 58 kg (128 lb)
- Spouse: Paul Coll (m. 2024)

Sport
- Country: Belgium
- Handedness: Right Handed
- Turned pro: 2013
- Coached by: Ronny Vlassaks
- Racquet used: Head

Women's singles
- Highest ranking: No. 4 (November 2023)
- Current ranking: No. 12 (3 November 2025)
- Title: 10
- Tour final: 18
- World Open: QF (2023 PSA Women's World Squash Championship)
Medal record
Women's squash
Representing Belgium
World Team Championships
Bronze medal – third place	2024 Hong Kong	Team

Nele Coll (née Gilis, born 20 February 1996) is a professional squash player who represents Belgium. She reached a career-high world ranking of World No. 4 in November 2023.

== Career ==
As a junior, Coll had significant success and became well-established internationally. She was the European Junior Squash Championships champion in 2014 and a semifinalist at the British Junior Open Squash 2015.

Coll clinched her first PSA World Tour title in 2016 at the Open International Des Volcans with a 3–1 win over Amanda Landers-Murphy leading her to break into the world's top 40. The next year Nele picked up her second title in the final of the Irish Open in five games against England's Millie Tomlinson. Later in 2017 at the start of the season in September, she achieved the biggest result of her professional career at the PSA W25 Open International de Squash de Nantes after reaching the final but coming up short against Englishwoman Fiona Moverley.

In May 2023, she reached the quarter final of the 2023 PSA Women's World Squash Championship, before losing to Joelle King.

In May 2024, Gillis helped Belgium win their first ever European Squash Team Championships and was a shock third round loser at the 2024 PSA Women's World Squash Championship. Later that year in December 2024, now married and competing as Nele Coll, she helped Belgium win the bronze medal at the 2024 Women's World Team Squash Championships.

== Personal life ==
Her younger sister Tinne Gilis is also a professional squash player and her fellow competitor on the PSA World Tour. Her younger brother Jo Gilis is a professional footballer in Belgium who has represented the Belgian national under-16 and under-17 football teams.

She married professional squash player Paul Coll of New Zealand in July 2024.
