= Heylie Fung =

Hong Kong squash player (born 2003)

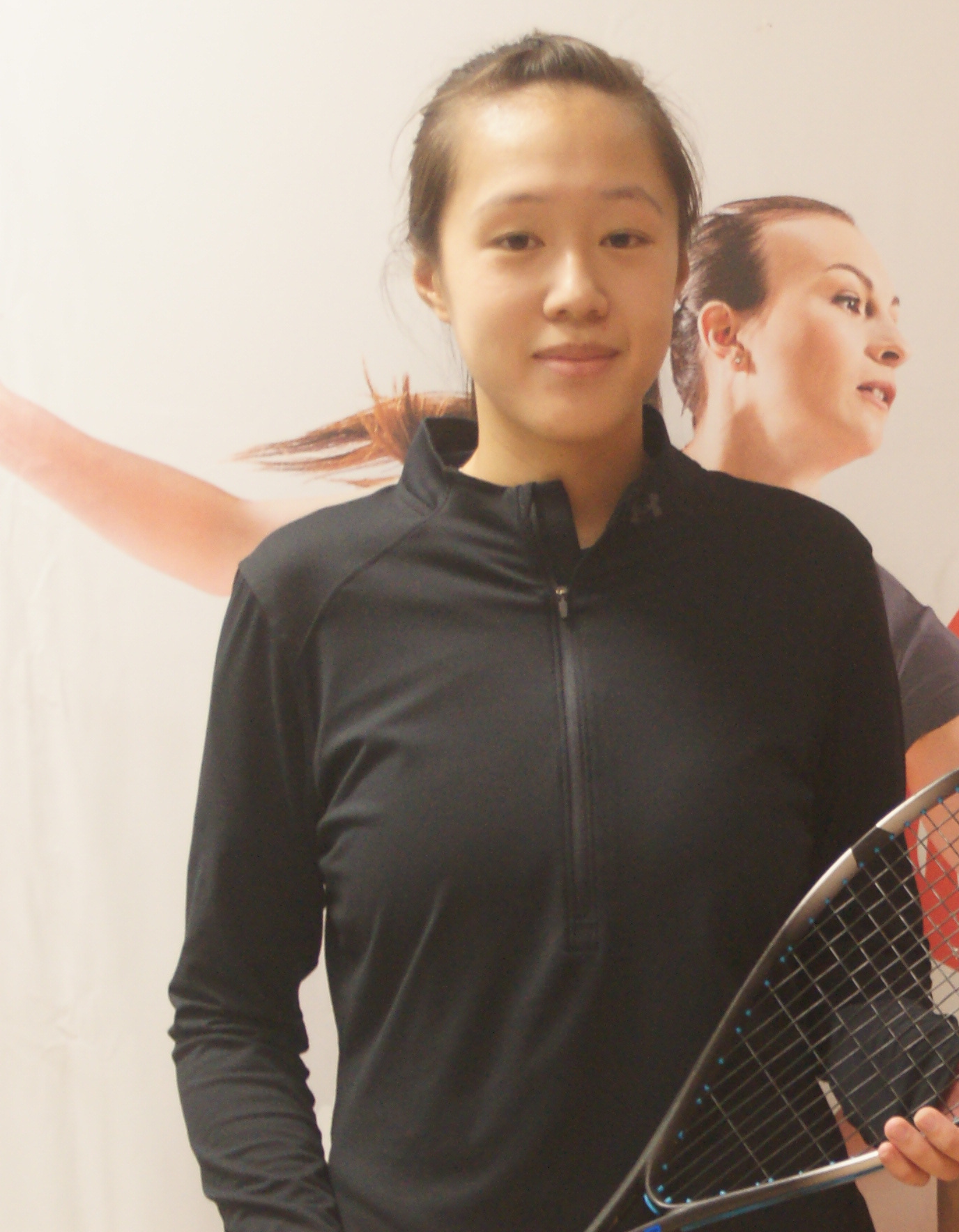
- Ching Hei Fung, Monte Carlo Squash Classic 2023

Personal information
- Born: 12 March 2003 (age 23) Hong Kong

Sport
- Country: Hong Kong, China
- Handedness: Right-handed
- Turned pro: 2020
- Retired: Active
- Racquet used: Dunlop

Women's singles
- Highest ranking: No. 83 (November 2023)
- Current ranking: No. 88 (October 2025)
- Title: 3

Ching Hei Fung, also known as Heylie Fung (Chinese: 馮靖晞; born 12 March 2003) is a Hong Kong professional squash player. She reached a career high ranking of 83 in the world during November 2023.

== Career ==
Fung won the 2022 Eastside Open.

In September 2024, she won her 2nd PSA title after securing victory in the HK Challenge Cup during the 2024–25 PSA Squash Tour. In October 2025, she won her 3rd PSA title after securing victory in the X during the 2025–26 PSA Squash Tour.
