= Curtis Malik =

English squash player

Personal information
- Born: 26 July 1999 (age 27) Redhill, England
- Website: maliksquash.pro

Sport
- Country: British (English)
- Retired: Active
- Racquet used: Mantis

Men's singles
- Highest ranking: No. 26 (May 2026)
- Current ranking: No. 26 (May 2026)
- Title: 10
Medal record
Men's squash
Representing England
World Team Championships
Silver medal – second place	2024 Hong Kong	Team
European Team Championships
Gold medal – first place	2023 Helsinki	Team
Gold medal – first place	2024 Uster	Team
Gold medal – first place	2025 Wrocław	Team
Gold medal – first place	2026 Amsterdam	Team

Curtis Malik (born 26 July 1999) is an English professional squash player. He reached a career high ranking of 26 in the world during May 2026.

== Career ==
After joining the PSA Tour and reached his first final in 2022, in the Hit and Run Sport Challenger.

By the start of 2022 he had reached the world's top 100 players and won the Holmes Naden Prestbury Squash Open, the Commercial Water Solutions Grange Challenger and the Colin Payne Kent Open. In April 2023, he hit a career best world ranking (at the time) of 53. He was a member of the England team that won the 2023 European Squash Team Championships. In May 2024, Malik helped England win retain the title at the 2024 European Team Championships.

In December 2024, Malik won a silver medal with England, at the 2024 Men's World Team Squash Championships in Hong Kong. In the final he went close to defeating Mazen Hesham in the opening match.

In March 2025, Malik won his 10th PSA title after securing victory in the Manitoba Open during the 2024–25 PSA Squash Tour. In May 2025, Malik was part of the England team that won the gold medal at the 2025 European Squash Team Championships in Wrocław, Poland and the 2026 European Team Championships in Amsterdam.

== Family ==
His siblings Perry, Torrie, Heston and Bailey are all professional squash players.
