= Haya Ali =

Egyptian squash player (born 2004)

Personal information
- Born: April 26, 2004 (age 22) Giza, Egypt

Sport
- Country: Egypt
- Turned pro: 2019
- Retired: Active
- Racquet used: Harrow

Women's singles
- Highest ranking: No. 52 (April 2024)
- Current ranking: No. 52 (April 2024)
- Updated on April 2024

Haya Ali (born 26 April 2004 in Giza) is an Egyptian professional squash player. As of April 2024, she was ranked number 52 in the world. She won the 2023 Breda Open and 2023 Hyder Trophy.
