= Yasshmita Jadishkumar =

Malaysian squash player (born 2004)

Personal information
- Born: July 28, 2004 (age 21) Johor, Malaysia
- Height: 167 cm (5 ft 6 in)
- Weight: 58 kg (128 lb)

Sport
- Country: Malaysian
- Handedness: Right-handed
- Turned pro: 2019
- Retired: Active
- Racquet used: Ashaway

Women's singles
- Highest ranking: No. 69 (February 2024)
- Current ranking: No. 83 (November 2025)
- Title: 4

Yasshmita Jadishkumar, also known as Jadish Kumar Yasshmita, (born 28 July 2004 in Johor) is a Malaysian squash player. She reached a career high ranking of 69 in the world during February 2024.

She won the 2023 Victorian Open and the 2023 Shepparton International, and qualified for the 2023 World Squash Championships.

In April 2025, Jadishkumar won her 3rd PSA title after securing victory in the Yokohama Open during the 2024–25 PSA Squash Tour and won a 4th (the Swiss Open) during the 2025–26 PSA Squash Tour.
