= Simon Herbert =

British squash player (born 2001)

Personal information
- Nationality: British (English)
- Born: 26 August 2001 (age 24) Leicester, England
- Height: 181 cm (5 ft 11 in)
- Weight: 61 kg (134 lb)

Sport
- Handedness: Right-handed
- Retired: Active
- Racquet used: Dunlop

Men's singles
- Highest ranking: No. 49 (November 2024)
- Current ranking: No. 59 (April 2026)
- Title: 6

Simon Herbert (born 26 August 2001) is an English professional squash player. He reached a career high ranking of 49 in the world during November 2024.

== Biography ==
Herbert represented Leicestershire at county level. In 2021 he won the Cheam Squash Classic, beating fellow Englishman Stuart McGregor for the win. In 2026 Herbert left New York Knights to join the Chicago Grizzlies in the USA national squash league.

In February 2026, Herbert won his fifth PSA title after securing victory in the Toronot Classic during the 2025–26 PSA Squash Tour. He then won a 6th title after winning the Ilhabela Open.
