= Nour Heikal =

Egyptian squash player (born 2003)

Personal information
- Born: 29 September 2003 (age 22) Alexandria, Egypt

Sport
- Country: Egypt
- Handedness: Right Handed
- Retired: Active
- Racquet used: Smouha

Women's singles
- Highest ranking: No. 45 (9 June 2025)
- Current ranking: No. 45 (14 July 2025)
Medal record
squash
Representing Egypt
World Cup
Bronze medal – third place	2025 Chennai	Team
- Updated on August 2021

Nour Heikal (born 29 September 2003 in Alexandria) is an Egyptian professional squash player. She turned professional in 2019. As of August 2021, she was ranked number 157 in the world.
