= Zeina Zein =

Egyptian squash player (born 2004)

Personal information
- Born: 2 December 2004 (age 21) Alexandria, Egypt

Sport
- Country: Canada
- Turned pro: 2020
- Retired: Active

Women's singles
- Highest ranking: No. 54 (May 2023)
- Current ranking: No. 111 (December 2025)
- Title: 5

Zeina Zein (born 2 December 2004) is a Canadian professional squash player. She reached a career high ranking of 54 in the world during May 2023.

== Career ==
In 2024, Zein won her 3rd PSA title after securing victory in the Northern Open during the 2024–25 PSA Squash Tour. During the same season on 7 June 2025 she won a fourth title, winning the Aftab Jawaid Memorial Women's Open in Houston.

Zein won a fifth PSA title, winning the In December 2025, X won his/her x PSA title after securing victory in the Maxéville Challenger during the 2025–26 PSA Squash Tour.
