= Perry Malik =

English squash player

Personal information
- Born: June 2001 (age 25) Redhill, Surrey, England
- Height: 180 cm (5 ft 11 in)
- Weight: 72 kg (159 lb)

Sport
- Turned pro: 2019
- Retired: Active
- Racquet used: Mantis

Men's singles
- Highest ranking: No. 73 (December 2025)
- Current ranking: No. 73 (December 2025)
- Title: 1

Perry Malik (born June 2001) is an English professional squash player. He reached a career high ranking of 73 in the world in December 2025.

== Career ==
Malik, part of a large squash family, reached the top five UK ranking in every age group from U11 top U19 and is a six-times county champion.

In 2019 he won the National College title and broke into the world's top 200 in November 2021. In July 2023 he made the top 100 for the first time, after being given the world ranking of 100.

In December 2025, Malik won first PSA title after securing victory in the Tunbridge Wells Open during the 2025–26 PSA Squash Tour.

== Family ==
His siblings Curtis and Torrie, Heston and Bailey are all professional squash players.
