= Saran Nghiem =

English squash player (born 2003)

Personal information
- Born: 25 December 2003 (age 22) Manchester, Greater Manchester, England

Sport
- Country: England
- Turned pro: 2020
- Retired: Active
- Racquet used: Dunlop

Women's singles
- Highest ranking: No. 50 (9 June 2025)
- Current ranking: No. 50 (14 July 2025)
- Updated on August 2022

Saran Nghiem (born 25 December 2003 in Manchester) is an English professional squash player. As of August 2022, she was ranked number 109 in the world. She won the 2021 US Junior Open. She won the 2022 Northern Open.
