= Edwin Clain =

French squash player (born 1999)

Personal information
- Nationality: French
- Born: 9 November 1999 (age 26) Créteil, France
- Height: 1.84 m (6 ft 0 in)
- Weight: 105 kg (231 lb)

Sport
- Turned pro: 2017
- Retired: Active
- Racquet used: Technifibre

men's singles
- Highest ranking: 78 (February 2024)
- Current ranking: 107 (May 2026)
- Title: 3

Edwin Clain (born 9 November 1999) is a French professional squash player. He achieved his highest career PSA ranking of 78 in February 2024.

== Biography ==
Clain competed at the 2018 Men's World Junior Squash Championships. In May 2026, he won his third PSA title after securing victory in the Bristol Open during the 2025–26 PSA Squash Tour.
