= Torrie Malik =

English squash player (born 2004)

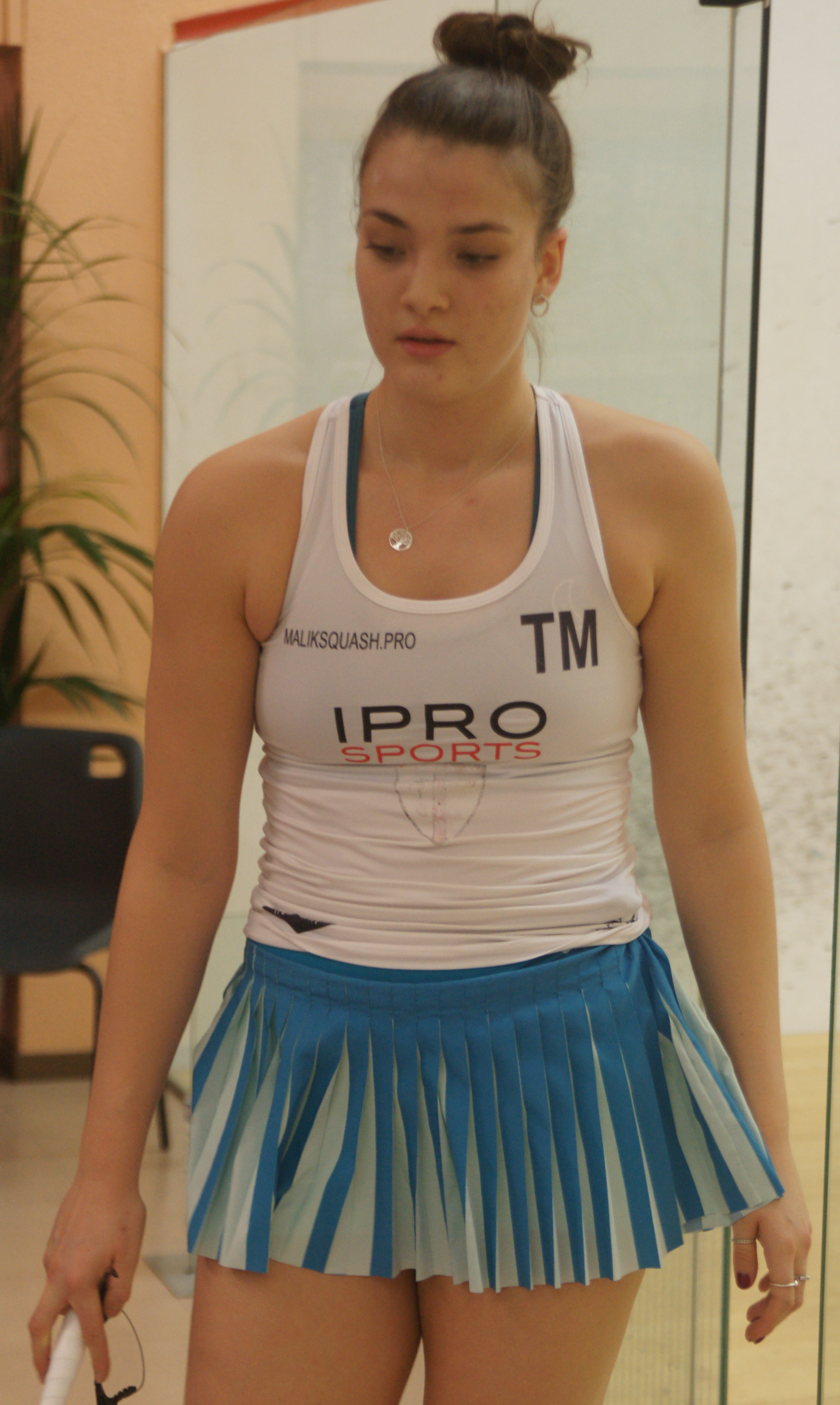
- Torrie Malik (2022)

Personal information
- Nationality: British (English)
- Born: 3 April 2004 (age 22) Redhill, England

Sport
- Turned pro: 2019
- Retired: Active
- Racquet used: Mantis

Women's singles
- Highest ranking: No. 41 (September 2025)
- Current ranking: No. 42 (December 2025)
- Title: 8
Medal record
Representing England
European Team Championships
Gold medal – first place	2026 Amsterdam	Team

Torrie Malik (born 3 April 2004) is an English professional squash player. She reached a career high ranking of 41 in the world during September 2025.

== Biography ==
Malik won her first PSA title after winning the Czech Open in November 2022 and then won the Purley Open shortly afterwards. A third title (the Kent Open) was secured in January 2023 and two months later she won the Mozart Open in Salzburg. Two more wins arrived in April and May respectively to bring her total to six wins during the 2022–23 PSA World Tour.

The following season on the 2023–24 PSA World Tour, she won the Couzeix Open in France and the Northern Cup in Manchester but despite several final appearances the year after, she was unable to extend her title count during the 2024–25 PSA Squash Tour. However in 2025, Mailk reached the final of the British National Squash Championships where she was beaten by Tesni Murphy.

In May 2026 she won the 2026 European Team Championships in Amsterdam with England.

== Family ==
Her siblings Curtis, Perry, Heston and Bailey are all professional squash players.
