= Salma El Tayeb =

Egyptian squash player (born 2004)

Personal information
- Born: 24 March 2004 (age 22) Cairo, Egypt

Sport
- Country: Egypt
- Turned pro: 2019
- Retired: Active
- Racquet used: Head

Women's singles
- Highest ranking: No. 33 (17 February 2025)
- Current ranking: No. 35 (14 July 2025)
- Updated on October 2021

Salma El Tayeb (also transliterated Eltayeb (born 24 March 2004 in Cairo) is an Egyptian professional squash player. As of October 2021, she was ranked number 80 in the world. She won the 2021 CAS International Squash Championship, in Islamabad, Pakistan in October that year.
