= Nardine Garas =

Egyptian squash player (born 2003)

Personal information
- Born: 19 December 2003 (age 22) Cairo, Egypt

Sport
- Country: Egypt
- Turned pro: 2019
- Retired: Active

Women's singles
- Highest ranking: No. 43 (December 2025)
- Current ranking: No. 43 (December 2025)
- Title: 6
Medal record
squash
Representing Egypt
World Cup
Bronze medal – third place	2025 Chennai	Team

Nardine Garas (born 19 December 2003), also known as Nardine Sameh Garas, is an Egyptian professional squash player. She reached a career high ranking of 43 in the world during December 2025.

== Career ==
She won the 2022 PSA des Hauts de France.

In 2024, Garas won her 5th PSA title after securing victory in the London Open during the 2024–25 PSA Squash Tour. In December 2025, she won her 6th PSA title after securing victory in the London Open during the 2025–26 PSA Squash Tour.
