= Grace Gear =

English squash player (born 1998)

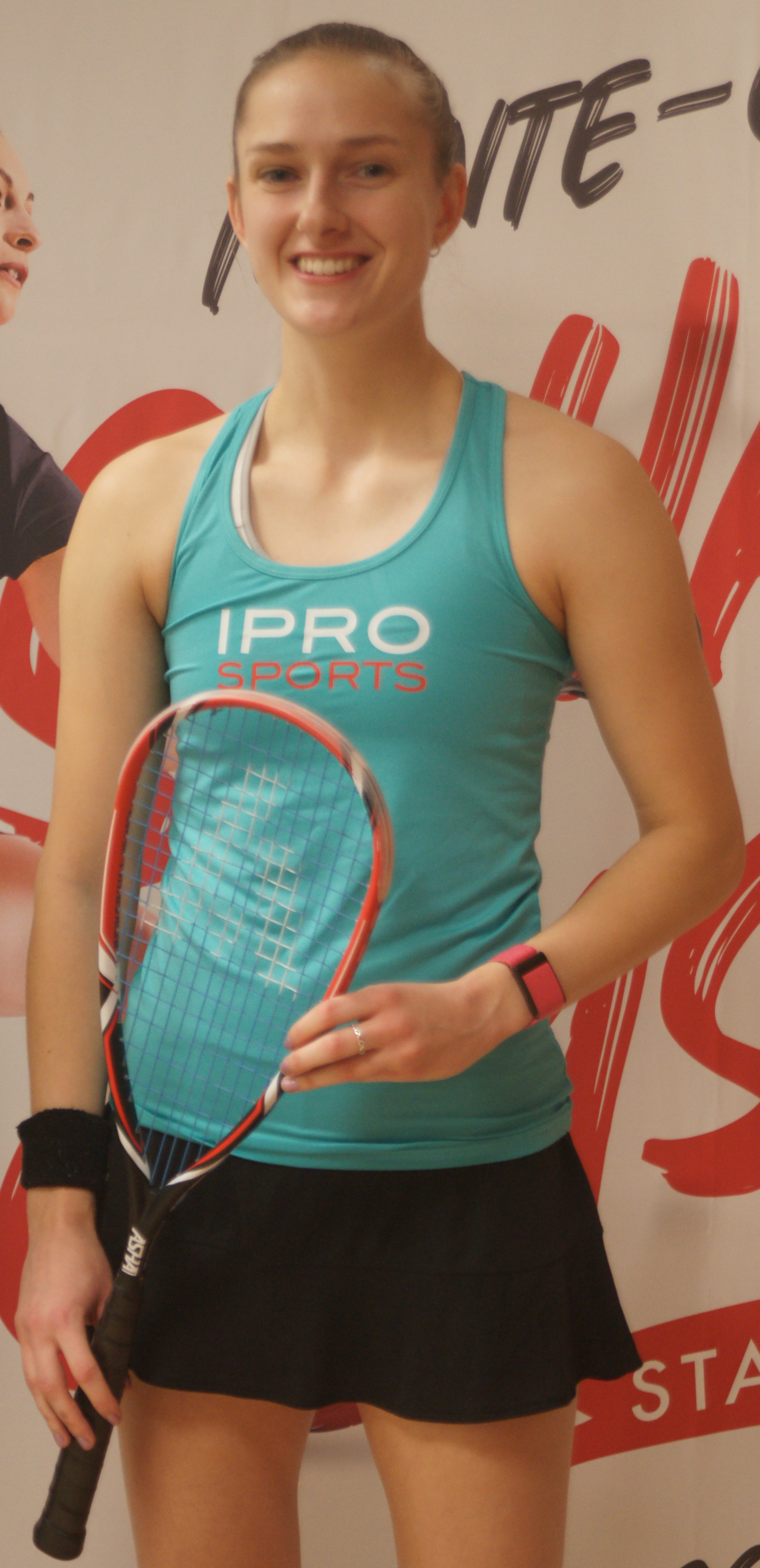
- Grace Gear, Monte-Carlo Squash Classic 2023

Personal information
- Born: 2 July 1998 (age 28) Welwyn Garden City, England
- Height: 169 cm (5 ft 7 in)
- Weight: 60 kg (132 lb)

Sport
- Country: England
- Handedness: Right Handed
- Coached by: Adam Fuller, Greg Dainty
- Retired: Active
- Racquet used: Harrow, Eye

Women's singles
- Highest ranking: No. 40 (March 2025)
- Current ranking: No. 41 (May 2025)
Medal record
Men's squash
Representing England
European Team Championships
Gold medal – first place	2025 Wrocław	Team

Grace Gear (born 2 July 1998 in Welwyn Garden City) is an English professional squash player. Gear reached a career high ranking of 40 in the world during March 2025.

== Biography ==
In addition to competing in numerous professional PSA tournaments, she has also played in the Squash Premier League. She has also represented England.

In September 2023, Gear won her 4th PSA title after securing victory in the Springfield Scottish Open during the 2023–24 PSA World Tour.

In May 2025, Gear was part of the England team that won the gold medal at the 2025 European Squash Team Championships in Wrocław, Poland.
