= Kenzy Ayman =

Egyptian squash player (born 2004)

Personal information
- Born: 18 March 2004 (age 22) Cairo, Egypt

Sport
- Country: Egypt
- Turned pro: 2019
- Retired: Active

Women's singles
- Highest ranking: No. 34 (9 Jun 2025)
- Current ranking: No. 34 (14 July 2025)
- Updated on September 2024

Kenzy Ayman (born 18 March 2004 in Cairo) is an Egyptian professional squash player. As of May 2024, she was ranked number 39 in the world, her highest PSA ranking.
