= Alicia Mead =

English squash player (born 1995)

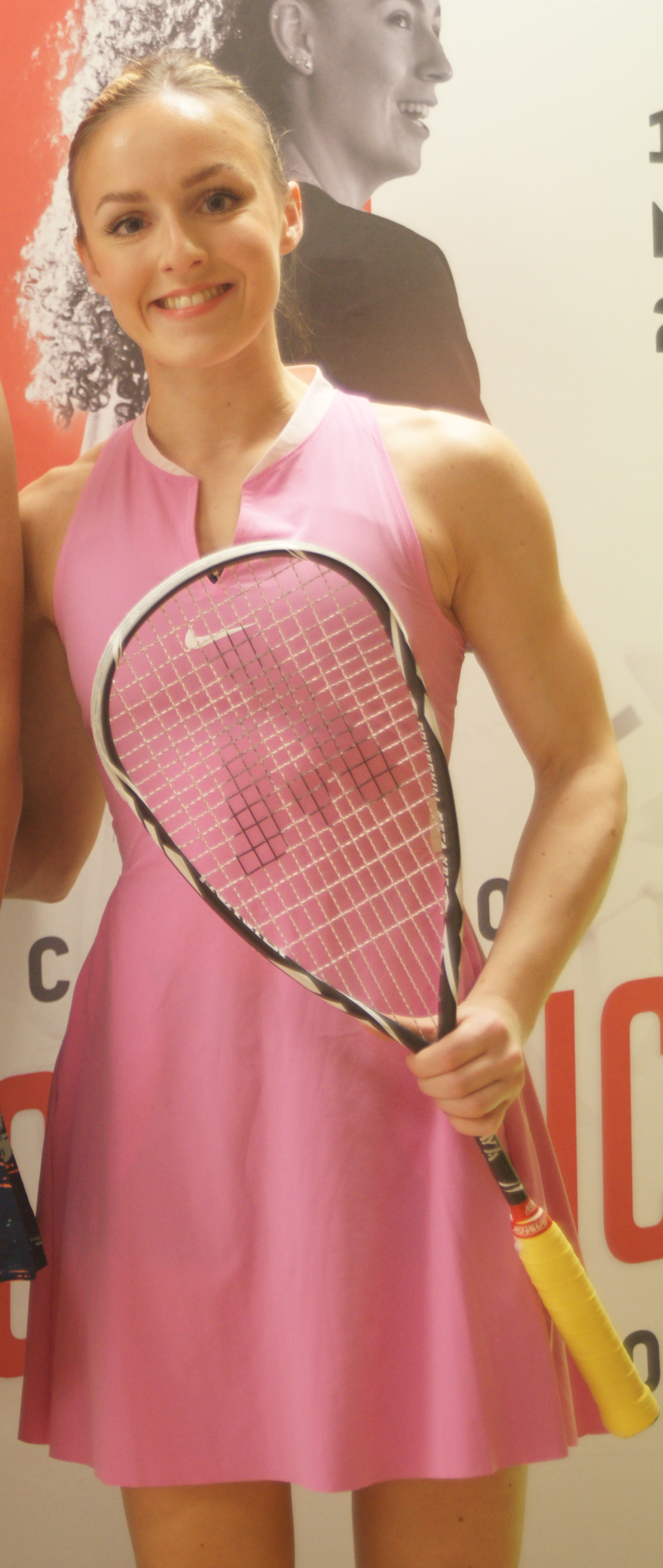

Personal information
- Born: 23 October 1995 (age 30) Nuneaton, Warwickshire, England

Sport
- Handedness: left-handed
- Turned pro: 2015
- Racquet used: Harrow
- Highest ranking: 94 (February 2020)
- Current ranking: 94 (February 2020)
- Updated on February 2020

Alicia Mead (born 23 October 1995) is an English professional squash player who currently plays for England women's national squash team. She achieved her highest career PSA singles ranking of 94 in February 2020 during the 2019–20 PSA World Tour.
