= Nour Aboulmakarim =

Egyptian squash player (born 2003)

Personal information
- Born: 18 February 2003 (age 23) Cairo, Egypt

Sport
- Country: Egypt
- Turned pro: 2018
- Retired: Active
- Racquet used: Tecnifibre

Women's singles
- Highest ranking: No. 36 (21 April 2025)
- Current ranking: No. 40 (14 July 2025)
- Updated on September 2024

Nour Aboulmakarim (born 18 February 2003 in Cairo) is an Egyptian professional squash player. As of 29 July 2024, she was ranked number 37 in the world.

== See also ==
Official Women's Squash World Ranking
