= Marta Domínguez (squash player) =

Spanish squash player (born 2001)

Marta Domínguez Fernández
Personal information
- Born: 2 August 2001 (age 24) Vigo, Spain

Sport
- Country: Spain
- Turned pro: 2020
- Retired: Active

Women's singles
- Highest ranking: No. 78 (December 2021)
- Current ranking: No. 78 (December 2021)
Medal record
Women's squash
Representing Spain
World Games
Bronze medal – third place	2025 Chengdu	Singles
- Updated on December 2021

Marta Domínguez Fernández (born 2 August 2001 in Vigo) is a Spanish professional squash player. As of August 2021, she was ranked number 78 in the world.
