= Malak Khafagy =

Egyptian squash player (born 2004)

Personal information
- Born: 25 July 2004 (age 22) Alexandria, Egypt
- Height: 172 cm (5 ft 8 in)
- Weight: 65 kg (143 lb)

Sport
- Country: Egypt
- Turned pro: 2020
- Retired: Active
- Racquet used: Tecnifibre

Women's singles
- Highest ranking: No. 23 (22 September 2025)
- Current ranking: No. 31 (3 July 2026)
- Title: 5

Malak Khafagy (Arabic: ملك خفاجي; born 25 July 2004) is an Egyptian professional squash player. She reached a career high ranking of number 23 in the world during June 2025.

== Biography ==
Khafagy won the 2023 Summer Pro and the 2023 Odense Open.

In June 2025, she won her 5th PSA title after securing victory in the Santiago Open during the 2024–25 PSA Squash Tour.
