= Ainaa Amani =

Malaysian squash player (born 2002)

Personal information
- Born: March 18, 2002 (age 24) Kuala Lumpur, Malaysia

Sport
- Country: Malaysia
- Handedness: Dunlop
- Turned pro: Right handed
- Retired: Active
- Racquet used: 2018

Women's singles
- Highest ranking: No. 46 (November 2024)
- Current ranking: No. 47 (14 July 2025)

Ainaa Amani (born 18 March 2002) is a Malaysian professional squash player. She reached a career high ranking of 46 in the world during November 2024.

== Career ==
She won the 2023 HK Squash Challenge Cup.

In September 2024, Amani won her 3rd PSA title after securing victory in the ACE Challenger during the 2024–25 PSA Squash Tour.
