= 2016 Men's World Junior Team Squash Championships =

Men's World Junior Team 2016
- 19th WSF Men's World Junior Team Championships
- Location: (Poland) Bielsko-Biała
- Website www.wsfworldjuniors.com

Results
- Champion: Pakistan
- Runner-up: Egypt
- Third place: England / United States

The 2016 Men's World Junior Team Squash Championships was held in Bielsko-Biała, Poland. The event took place from 12 to 17 August 2016.

== Seeds ==
1. Egypt
2. Pakistan
3. France
4. India
5. England
6. United States
7. Malaysia
8. Canada
9. New Zealand
10. Australia
11. Hong Kong
12. Jordan

== Group stage ==
=== Pool A ===
| Egypt | 3–0 | Switzerland |
| Egypt | 2–1 | Jordan |
| Jordan | 3–0 | Switzerland |

| Rank | Nation | Match | Win | Lost | Points |
|---|---|---|---|---|---|
| 1 | Egypt | 2 | 2 | 0 | 4 |
| 2 | Jordan | 2 | 1 | 1 | 2 |
| 3 | Switzerland | 2 | 0 | 2 | 0 |

=== Pool B ===
| Pakistan | 3–0 | Germany |
| Pakistan | 3–0 | Hong Kong |
| Hong Kong | 3–0 | Germany |

| Rank | Nation | Match | Win | Lost | Points |
|---|---|---|---|---|---|
| 1 | Pakistan | 2 | 2 | 0 | 4 |
| 2 | Hong Kong | 2 | 1 | 1 | 2 |
| 3 | Germany | 2 | 0 | 2 | 0 |

=== Pool C ===
| France | 3–0 | Guatemala |
| France | 2–1 | Australia |
| Australia | 2–1 | Guatemala |

| Rank | Nation | Match | Win | Lost | Points |
|---|---|---|---|---|---|
| 1 | France | 2 | 2 | 0 | 4 |
| 2 | Australia | 2 | 1 | 1 | 2 |
| 3 | Guatemala | 2 | 0 | 2 | 0 |

=== Pool D ===
| India | 3–0 | Argentina |
| New Zealand | 3–0 | Poland |
| India | 2–1 | New Zealand |
| Argentina | 3–0 | Poland |
| India | 3–0 | Poland |
| New Zealand | 3–0 | Argentina |

| Rank | Nation | Match | Win | Lost | Points |
|---|---|---|---|---|---|
| 1 | India | 3 | 3 | 0 | 6 |
| 2 | New Zealand | 3 | 2 | 1 | 4 |
| 3 | Argentina | 3 | 1 | 2 | 2 |
| 4 | Poland | 3 | 0 | 3 | 0 |

=== Pool E ===
| England | 3–0 | Israel |
| Canada | 3–0 | Zimbabwe |
| England | 2–1 | Canada |
| Israel | 3–0 | Zimbabwe |
| Canada | 3–0 | Israel |
| England | 3–0 | Zimbabwe |

| Rank | Nation | Match | Win | Lost | Points |
|---|---|---|---|---|---|
| 1 | England | 3 | 3 | 0 | 6 |
| 2 | Canada | 3 | 2 | 1 | 4 |
| 3 | Israel | 3 | 1 | 2 | 2 |
| 4 | Zimbabwe | 3 | 0 | 3 | 0 |

=== Pool F ===
| Malaysia | 3–0 | Spain |
| United States | 3–0 | South Africa |
| South Africa | 3–0 | Spain |
| United States | 2–1 | Malaysia |
| United States | 3–0 | Spain |
| Malaysia | 1–2 | South Africa |

| Rank | Nation | Match | Win | Lost | Points |
|---|---|---|---|---|---|
| 1 | United States | 3 | 3 | 0 | 6 |
| 2 | South Africa | 3 | 2 | 1 | 4 |
| 3 | Malaysia | 3 | 1 | 2 | 2 |
| 4 | Spain | 3 | 0 | 3 | 0 |

== Knockout stage ==
=== Bracket ===
Round of 16
Canada | 0 | 3 | 0
New Zealand | 3 | 2 | 3
England | 3 | 3
Hong Kong | 0 | 0
Jordan | 3 | 0 | 1
United States | 2 | 3 | 3
South Africa | 0 | 2 | 2
Australia | 3 | 3 | 0

Quarterfinals
Egypt | 3 | 3
New Zealand | 0 | 0
India | 0 | 0 | 1
England | 3 | 3 | 2
United States | 2 | 3 | 3
France | 3 | 2 | 1
Australia | 0 | 0 | 0
Pakistan | 3 | 3 | 2

Semifinals
Egypt | 3 | 3 | 1
England | 0 | 2 | 2
United States | 1 | 0
Pakistan | 3 | 3

Final
Egypt | 0 | 3 | 0
Pakistan | 3 | 1 | 3

=== Semi-finals ===
Egypt
2
Semi-final 1
Bielsko-Biała, Poland
16 August 2016

England
1

| | | | 1 | 2 | 3 | 4 | 5 |
|---|---|---|---|---|---|---|---|
| 1 | (Egypt) (England) | Marwan Tarek; Harry Falconer | 12; 10 | 11; 6 | 11; 5 |
| 2 | (Egypt) (England) | Saadeldin Abouaish; Charlie Lee | 6; 11 | 11; 4 | 11; 9 | 11; 13 | 11; 8 |
| 3 | (Egypt) (England) | Youssef Ibrahim; Kyle Finch | 5; 11 | 8; 11 | 10; 12 |

United States
0
Semi-final 2
Bielsko-Biała, Poland
16 August 2016

Pakistan
2

| | | | 1 | 2 | 3 | 4 | 5 |
|---|---|---|---|---|---|---|---|---|
| 1 | (United States) (Pakistan) | Samuel Scherl; Abbas Shoukat | 12; 10 | 4; 11 | 4; 11 | 5; 11 |
| 2 | (United States) (Pakistan) | Andrew Douglas; Israr Ahmed | 9; 11 | 9; 11 | 9; 11 |
| 3 | (United States) (Pakistan) | Spencer Lovejoy; Ahsan Ayaz | | | | | | not played |

=== Final ===
Egypt
1
Final
Bielsko-Biała, Poland
17 August 2016

Pakistan
2

| | | | 1 | 2 | 3 | 4 | 5 |
|---|---|---|---|---|---|---|---|
| 1 | (Egypt) (Pakistan) | Saadeldin Abouaish; Israr Ahmed | 9; 11 | 9; 11 | 9; 11 |
| 2 | (Egypt) (Pakistan) | Youssef Ibrahim; Ahsan Ayaz | 13; 11 | 11; 13 | 11; 5 | 11; 6 |
| 3 | (Egypt) (Pakistan) | Marwan Tarek; Abbas Shoukat | 7; 11 | 9; 11 | 8; 11 |

== Final standing ==
| Rank | Team |
|---|---|
| 1 | Pakistan |
| 2 | Egypt |
| 3 | England |
| 3 | United States |
| 5 | France |
| 6 | India |
| 7 | Australia |
| 8 | New Zealand |
| 9 | Hong Kong |
| 10 | Jordan |
| 11 | Canada |
| 12 | South Africa |
| 13 | Malaysia |
| 14 | Switzerland |
| 15 | Spain |
| 16 | Israel |
| 17 | Germany |
| 18 | Guatemala |
| 19 | Argentina |
| 20 | Poland |
| 21 | Zimbabwe |

== See also ==
- 2016 Men's World Junior Squash Championships
- World Junior Squash Championships

| Preceded by Namibia (Windhoek); 2014 | Squash World Junior Team; Poland (Bielsko-Biała); 2016 | Succeeded by India (Chennai); 2018 |
