= 2016 Men's World Junior Squash Championships =

Men's World Junior 2016
- 24th WSF Men's World Junior Championship
- Location: (Poland) Bielsko-Biała
- Website www.wsfworldjuniors.com

Results
- Champion: (Malaysia) Ng Eain Yow
- Runner-up: (Egypt) Saadeldin Abouaish
- Semi-finalists: (Pakistan) Israr Ahmed (Egypt) Youssef Ibrahim

The 2016 Men's World Junior Squash Championships is the men's edition of the 2016 World Junior Squash Championships, which serves as the individual world Junior championship for squash players. The event took place in Bielsko-Biała in Poland from 6 to 11 August 2016.

== Seeds ==
1. [1*] (Egypt) Saadeldin Abouaish (final)
2. [2*] (Malaysia) Ng Eain Yow (champions)
3. [3/4*] (Pakistan) Israr Ahmed (semifinals)
4. [3/4*] (Egypt) Youssef Ibrahim (semifinals)
5. [5/8*] (Japan) Ryunosuke Tsukue (quarterfinals)
6. [5/8*] (France) Benjamin Aubert (quarterfinals)
7. [5/8*] (Jordan) Mohammad Al-Saraj (fourth round)
8. [5/8*] (Egypt) Karim Magdy (third round)
9. [9/12*] (England) Kyle Finch (third round)
10. [9/12*] (England) Charlie Lee (fourth round)
11. [9/12*] (India) Velavan Senthilkumar (quarterfinals)
12. [9/12*] (Egypt) Marwan Tarek Abdelhamid (quarterfinals)
13. [13/16*] (Iran) Sajad Zareian Jahromi (fourth round)
14. [13/16*] (France) Victor Crouin (fourth round)
15. [13/16*] (Egypt) Ziad Sakr (second round)
16. [13/16*] (United States) Samuel Scherl (third round)

== Draw and results ==
=== Finals ===
Quarter-finals
1	(Egypt) Saadeldin Abouaish	11	12	6	11	11
5/8	(France) Benjamin Aubert	5	14	11	2	9
9/12	(Egypt) Marwan Tarek Abdelhamid	6	9	11	11	5
3/4	(Pakistan) Israr Ahmed	11	11	8	7	11
3/4	(Egypt) Youssef Ibrahim	11	2	11	11
5/8	(Japan) Ryunosuke Tsukue	7	11	6	8
9/12	(India) Velavan Senthilkumar	6	4	11	5
2	(Malaysia) Ng Eain Yow	11	11	9	11

Semi-finals
1	(Egypt) Saadeldin Abouaish	11	5	11	11
3/4	(Pakistan) Israr Ahmed	5	11	6	1
3/4	(Egypt) Youssef Ibrahim	11	10	11	8
2	(Malaysia) Ng Eain Yow	13	12	6	11

Final
1	(Egypt) Saadeldin Abouaish	3	11	7	5
2	(Malaysia) Ng Eain Yow	11	9	11	11

=== Top half ===
==== Section 1 ====
First round
(Guatemala) Ricardo Toscano	11	11	11
(Republic of Ireland) Stephen Hearst	8	6	5
(Germany) Jan Siegle	11	6	8	8
(Australia) William Curtis	3	11	11	11
(Argentina) Jeremías Azaña	7	9	7
(Hong Kong) Ng Ka Yiu	11	11	11
(Poland) Mikolaj Korsak	1	6	4
(India) Aryaman Adik	11	11	11
(New Zealand) Scott Galloway	11	11	11
(Switzerland) Yannick Wilhelmi	6	6	8

Second round
1	(Egypt) Saadeldin Abouaish	11	11	11
(Guatemala) Ricardo Toscano	5	4	3
(Australia) William Curtis	11	11	5	6
(Hong Kong) Ng Ka Yiu	6	13	11	11
(Australia) Alex Eustace	11	5	11	12
(India) Aryaman Adik	6	11	4	10
(New Zealand) Scott Galloway	4	12	4	9
13/16	(Iran) Sajad Zareian Jahromi	11	10	11	11

Third Round
1	(Egypt) Saadeldin Abouaish	11	11	11
(Hong Kong) Ng Ka Yiu	4	6	9
(Australia) Alex Eustace	9	8	6
13/16	(Iran) Sajad Zareian Jahromi	11	11	11

Fourth round
1	(Egypt) Saadeldin Abouaish	7	11	7	11	11
13/16	(Iran) Sajad Zareian Jahromi	11	5	11	7	7

==== Section 2 ====
First round
(Canada) Ravi Seth	16	6	4
(Belgium) Sanjay Jeeva	18	11	11
(Malaysia) Marcus Sim Wei Jie	12	11	11
(South Africa) Richard-John Kuhn	10	4	7
(Jordan) Abedalkader Jeitan	11	6	6
(India) Adithya Raghavan	13	11	11
(Pakistan) Ahsan Ayaz	11	11	11
(Australia) Joseph White	7	2	7
(Switzerland) Nils Roesch	8	9	9
(Poland) Maksymilian Wielgus	11	11	11
(Zimbabwe) Callum Lawton	5	5	2
(South Korea) Ryu Han-dong	11	11	11

Second round
9/12	(England) Kyle Finch	11	11	11	12
(Belgium) Sanjay Jeeva	13	5	4	10
(Malaysia) Marcus Sim Wei Jie	10	12	6
(India) Adithya Raghavan	12	14	11
(Pakistan) Ahsan Ayaz	11	11	11
(Poland) Maksymilian Wielgus	3	0	3
(South Korea) Ryu Han-dong	5	1	10
5/8	(France) Benjamin Aubert	11	11	12

Third Round
9/12	(England) Kyle Finch	12	11	8	11	9
(India) Adithya Raghavan	14	4	11	5	11
(Pakistan) Ahsan Ayaz	7	7	7
5/8	(France) Benjamin Aubert	11	11	11

Fourth round
(India) Adithya Raghavan	7	3	9
5/8	(France) Benjamin Aubert	11	11	11

==== Section 3 ====
First round
(Colombia) Ronald Palomino	11	11	11
(Czech Republic) Ondrej Jansky	7	4	8
(Argentina) Juan Barreyro	11	11	11
(Guatemala) Roberto Urruela Bowen	2	4	3
(Hong Kong) Harley Lam	5	11	7	5
(Canada) Matthew Henderson	11	4	11	11
(United States) Harrison Gill	18	11	11
(England) Nicholas Wall	16	6	5
(Zimbabwe) Ethan Alfalfa Porter	1	1	4
(France) Sébastian Bonmalais	11	11	11

Second round
5/8	(Jordan) Mohammad Al-Saraj	8	11	11	11
(Colombia) Ronald Palomino	11	6	9	7
(Argentina) Juan Barreyro	10	6	9
(Canada) Matthew Henderson	12	11	11
(United States) Spencer Lovejoy	8	11	11	11
(United States) Harrison Gill	11	1	9	9
(France) Sébastian Bonmalais	13	2	11	8
9/12	(Egypt) Marwan Tarek Abdelhamid	11	11	13	11

Third Round
5/8	(Jordan) Mohammad Al-Saraj	11	11	12	11
(Canada) Matthew Henderson	3	4	14	4
(United States) Spencer Lovejoy	5	13	7	5
9/12	(Egypt) Marwan Tarek Abdelhamid	11	11	11	11

Fourth round
5/8	(Jordan) Mohammad Al-Saraj	9	9	9
9/12	(Egypt) Marwan Tarek Abdelhamid	11	11	11

==== Section 4 ====
First round
(England) Harry Falconer	9	11	6	12	11
(New Zealand) Sam Sayes	11	8	11	10	3
(South Africa) Sipho Ncube	9	11	8	12
(Germany) Loïc Hennard	11	6	11	14
(Egypt) Abdalah El Masry	wo
(Brazil) Pedro Gomes
(Canada) Noel Heaton	11	11	11
(Switzerland) Luca Zatti	9	7	7
(Poland) Piotr Hemmerling
(Malaysia) Mohd Farez Izwan	wo

Second round
13/16	(United States) Samuel Scherl	11	11	11
(England) Harry Falconer	5	8	9
(Germany) Loïc Hennard	4	4	6
(Pakistan) Abbas Shoukat	11	11	11
(Egypt) Abdalah El Masry	12	11	11
(Canada) Noel Heaton	10	6	6
(Malaysia) Mohd Farez Izwan	4	2	5
3/4	(Pakistan) Israr Ahmed	11	11	11

Third Round
13/16	(United States) Samuel Scherl	8	8	6
(Pakistan) Abbas Shoukat	11	11	11
(Egypt) Abdalah El Masry	7	8	10
3/4	(Pakistan) Israr Ahmed	11	11	12

Fourth round
(Pakistan) Abbas Shoukat	6	10	4
3/4	(Pakistan) Israr Ahmed	11	12	11

=== Bottom half ===
==== Section 5 ====
First round
(Australia) Alex Oswald	11	7	11	11
(South Africa) Callan Mackenzie Hall	8	11	1	3
(Jordan) Hamza Alzubaidi	7	10	11	8
(Pakistan) Mehran Javed	11	12	6	11
(England) Adam Corcoran	7	12	11	6
(United States) Andrew Douglas	11	14	5	11
(Malaysia) Ong Sai Hung	11	11	11
(Poland) Mateusz Szewczyk	3	9	7
(Switzerland) Roman Allinckx	13	5	4	8
(India) Ranjit Singh	11	11	11	11

Second round
3/4	(Egypt) Youssef Ibrahim	13	5	11	11
(Australia) Alex Oswald	11	11	2	4
(Pakistan) Mehran Javed	12	7	8	8
(United States) Andrew Douglas	10	11	11	11
(Scotland) Richard Hollins	5	7	11	11	6
(Malaysia) Ong Sai Hung	11	11	8	6	11
(India) Ranjit Singh	8	5	7
13/16	(France) Victor Crouin	11	11	11

Third Round
3/4	(Egypt) Youssef Ibrahim	11	12	12
(United States) Andrew Douglas	4	10	10
(Malaysia) Ong Sai Hung	8	5	7
13/16	(France) Victor Crouin	11	11	11

Fourth round
3/4	(Egypt) Youssef Ibrahim	11	12	7	11
13/16	(France) Victor Crouin	4	10	11	7

==== Section 6 ====
First round
(Spain) Nilo Vidal	11	11	11
(Germany) Robin Ebert	8	9	7
(Canada) Rahul Sehrawat	11	11	11
(Zimbabwe) Nicholas Joughin	2	1	0
(New Zealand) Jamie Oakley	11	11	11
(Poland) Filip Jarota	4	6	5
(Hong Kong) Matthew Lai Chuek Nam	8	8	11	11	3
(India) Robin Mann	11	11	9	7	11
(Malaysia) Darren Rahul Pragasam
(Argentina) Matias Kupferberg	wo

Second round
9/12	(England) Charlie Lee	11	11	11
(Spain) Nilo Vidal	0	2	6
(Canada) Rahul Sehrawat	7	5	9
(United States) Gabriel Morgan	11	11	11
(New Zealand) Jamie Oakley	11	11	11
(India) Robin Mann	8	8	7
(Argentina) Matias Kupferberg	2	5	1
5/8	(Japan) Ryunosuke Tsukue	11	11	11

Third Round
9/12	(England) Charlie Lee	11	10
(United States) Gabriel Morgan	5	1^{r}
(New Zealand) Jamie Oakley	8	4	5
5/8	(Japan) Ryunosuke Tsukue	11	11	11

Fourth round
9/12	(England) Charlie Lee	5	6	6
5/8	(Japan) Ryunosuke Tsukue	11	11	11

==== Section 7 ====
First round
(Switzerland) Christoph Zust	10	11	11	13
(Jordan) Ibrahim Abdulaban	12	5	3	11
(Colombia) Matías Knudsen	11	11	11
(Australia) Nicholas Calvert	5	3	5
(United States) Eric Kim	7	5	3
(Pakistan) Kashif Asif	11	11	11
(South Africa) Adam Shean	11	9	11	11
(Hong Kong) Lincoln Chan Wui Ki	8	11	4	9
(France) Rohan Mandil	10	9	5
(Guatemala) Alejandro Enríquez	12	11	11

Second round
5/8	(Egypt) Karim Magdy	11	11	11
(Switzerland) Christoph Zust	3	3	6
(Colombia) Matías Knudsen	8	6	4
(Pakistan) Kashif Asif	11	11	11
(Canada) Michael Mehl	11	11	11
(South Africa) Adam Shean	9	6	4
(Guatemala) Alejandro Enríquez	6	11	3	11	3
9/12	(India) Velavan Senthilkumar	11	8	11	8	11

Third Round
5/8	(Egypt) Karim Magdy	10	3	11	1
(Pakistan) Kashif Asif	12	11	9	11
(Canada) Michael Mehl	9	11	10
9/12	(India) Velavan Senthilkumar	11	13	12

Fourth round
(Pakistan) Kashif Asif	11	3	3	3
9/12	(India) Velavan Senthilkumar	5	11	11	11

==== Section 8 ====
First round
(Argentina) Rodrigo Bonzo	3	0	7
(England) Tom Walsh	11	11	11
(Zimbabwe) Luke Mannion	1	4	2
(South Korea) Lee In-woo	11	11	11
(India) Abhay Singh	11	13	13
(Belgium) Cedric De Vos	4	11	11
(Iran) Alireza Shameli	11	11	11
(Australia) Jon Van Der Kreek	4	7	6
(New Zealand) Finn Trimble	11	11	11
(Poland) Mateusz Osojca	1	5	1

Second round
13/16	(Egypt) Ziad Sakr	13	7	8	10
(England) Tom Walsh	11	11	11	12
(South Korea) Lee In-woo	8	11	11	11
(Germany) Tobias Weggen	11	6	8	4
(India) Abhay Singh	11	5	12	4	11
(Iran) Alireza Shameli	8	11	10	11	7
(New Zealand) Finn Trimble	2	4	4
2	(Malaysia) Ng Eain Yow	11	11	11

Third Round
(England) Tom Walsh	11	12	11
(South Korea) Lee In-woo	5	10	6
(India) Abhay Singh	5	6	4
2	(Malaysia) Ng Eain Yow	11	11	11

Fourth round
(England) Tom Walsh	11	5	3
2	(Malaysia) Ng Eain Yow	13	11	11

== See also ==
- 2016 Women's World Junior Squash Championships
- World Junior Squash Championships

Preceded by Netherlands (Eindhoven); 2015	Squash World Junior; Poland (Bielsko-Biała); 2016	Succeeded by New Zealand (Tauranga); 2017
