= 2017 Men's World Junior Squash Championships =

Men's World Junior 2017
- 25th WSF Men's World Junior Championship
- Location: (New Zealand) Tauranga
- Website www.wsfworldjuniors.com

Results
- Champion: (Egypt) Marwan Tarek
- Runner-up: (France) Victor Crouin
- Semi-finalists: (Jordan) Mohammad Al-Saraj (Egypt) Youssef Ibrahim

The 2017 Men's World Junior Squash Championships is the men's edition of the 2017 World Junior Squash Championships, which serves as the individual world Junior championship for squash players. The event took place in Tauranga in New Zealand from 19 to 24 July 2017.

== Seeds ==
1. [1*] (Egypt) Youssef Ibrahim (semifinals)
2. [2*] (Jordan) Mohammad Al-Saraj (semifinals)
3. [3/4*] (France) Victor Crouin (final)
4. [3/4*] (Egypt) Marwan Tarek (champions)
5. [5/8*] (United States) Andrew Douglas (quarterfinals)
6. [5/8*] (England) Kyle Finch (fourth round)
7. [5/8*] (India) Adhitya Raghavan (fourth round)
8. [5/8*] (India) Abhay Singh (quarterfinals)
9. [9/12*] (Switzerland) Roman Allinckx (third round)
10. [9/12*] (Egypt) Mostafa Asal (quarterfinals)
11. [9/12*] (Egypt) Mohamed Elshamy (fourth round)
12. [9/12*] (England) Tom Walsh (fourth round)
13. [13/16*] (England) Adam Corcoran (fourth round)
14. [13/16*] (Malaysia) Darren Rahul Pragasam (fourth round)
15. [13/16*] (Malaysia) Ong Sai Hung (fourth round)
16. [13/16*] (Pakistan) Mansoor Zaman (second round)

== Draw and results ==
=== Finals ===
Quarter-finals
1	(Egypt) Youssef Ibrahim	11	11	10	10	11
5/8	(United States) Andrew Douglas	4	3	12	12	9
5/8	(India) Abhay Singh	11	4	6	6
3/4	(Egypt) Marwan Tarek	8	11	11	11
3/4	(France) Victor Crouin	11	11	11
(Egypt) Aly Hussein	8	4	4
9/12	(Egypt) Mostafa Asal	8	6	6
2	(Jordan) Mohammad Al-Saraj	11	11	11

Semi-finals
1	(Egypt) Youssef Ibrahim	11	7	11	10
3/4	(Egypt) Marwan Tarek	13	11	7	12
3/4	(France) Victor Crouin	11	8	11	11
2	(Jordan) Mohammad Al-Saraj	6	11	6	6

Final
3/4	(Egypt) Marwan Tarek	11	3	11	3	11
3/4	(France) Victor Crouin	9	11	6	11	2

=== Top half ===
==== Section 1 ====
First round
(Saudi Arabia) Eid Alotaibi	2	5	4
(Canada) Salaheldin Eltorgman	11	11	11

Second round
1	(Egypt) Youssef Ibrahim	11	11	11
(Canada) Salaheldin Eltorgman	2	6	3
(Colombia) Ronald Palomino	11	11	11
(India) Aryaman Adik	6	7	3
(Egypt) Ahmed Elmashad	11	11	11
(Germany) Nils Schwab	5	2	6
(South Africa) Glenn Yates	6	8	6
13/16	(Malaysia) Ong Sai Hung	11	11	11

Third Round
1	(Egypt) Youssef Ibrahim	11	11	11
(Colombia) Ronald Palomino	8	7	6
(Egypt) Ahmed Elmashad	11	11	11	5	4
13/16	(Malaysia) Ong Sai Hung	3	5	13	11	11

Fourth round
1	(Egypt) Youssef Ibrahim	9	16	14	11	11
13/16	(Malaysia) Ong Sai Hung	11	14	16	7	5

==== Section 2 ====
First round
(South Africa) Blaine Verhage	11	11	11	11
(Colombia) Nicolás Serna	6	9	13	9
(New Zealand) Lwamba Chileshe	13	5	9
(Pakistan) Zeeshan Zeb	15	11	11

Second round
9/12	(England) Tom Walsh	11	11	11
(South Africa) Blaine Verhage	5	1	3
(Argentina) Dylan Tymkiw	3	3	2
(Australia) Nicholas Calvert	11	11	11
(Belgium) Sanjay Jeeva	11	13	11
(Malaysia) Siow Yee Xian	4	11	6
(Pakistan) Zeeshan Zeb	9	3	6
5/8	(United States) Andrew Douglas	11	11	11

Third Round
9/12	(England) Tom Walsh	11	11	11
(Australia) Nicholas Calvert	2	5	5
(Belgium) Sanjay Jeeva	11	6	9	7
5/8	(United States) Andrew Douglas	8	11	11	11

Fourth round
9/12	(England) Tom Walsh	4	9	6
5/8	(United States) Andrew Douglas	11	11	11

==== Section 3 ====
First round
(New Zealand) Gabe Yam	11	11	11
(Australia) Jacob Ford	1	5	8
(South Africa) Keanu Langford	5	11	11	2	2
(Argentina) Jeremias Azaña	11	4	9	11	11

Second round
5/8	(India) Abhay Singh	11	11	11
(New Zealand) Gabe Yam	6	6	9
(Colombia) Martin Ríos	2	0	5
(United States) Harrison Gill	11	11	11
(United States) Cole Becker	11	11	11
(Poland) Maksymilian Wielgus	4	4	6
(Argentina) Jeremias Azaña	7	13	4	11
9/12	(Egypt) Mohamed Elshamy	11	11	11	13

Third Round
5/8	(India) Abhay Singh	11	11	11
(United States) Harrison Gill	6	3	12
(United States) Cole Becker	5	11	11	5	10
9/12	(Egypt) Mohamed Elshamy	11	8	9	11	12

Fourth round
5/8	(India) Abhay Singh	10	11	13	11
9/12	(Egypt) Mohamed Elshamy	12	7	11	8

==== Section 4 ====
First round
(Norway) Jesper Phillips	8	11	11	11
(Argentina) Matias Kupferberg	11	6	8	9

Second round
13/16	(England) Adam Corcoran	11	11	11
(Australia) Maaz Khatri	1	5	1
(Saudi Arabia) Abdulmajeed Boureggah	1	4	2
(New Zealand) Finn Trimble	11	11	11
(Pakistan) Abdul Malik Imran	9	11	7	7
(India) Yash Fadte	11	8	11	11
(Norway) Jesper Phillips	0	5	5
3/4	(Egypt) Marwan Tarek	11	11	11

Third Round
13/16	(England) Adam Corcoran	11	10	11	11
(New Zealand) Finn Trimble	4	12	5	7
(India) Yash Fadte	5	4	6
3/4	(Egypt) Marwan Tarek	11	11	11

Fourth round
13/16	(England) Adam Corcoran	5	6	12
3/4	(Egypt) Marwan Tarek	11	11	14

=== Bottom half ===
==== Section 5 ====
First round
(Argentina) Juan Cortés	11	11	11
(Saudi Arabia) Mohammad Almwled	1	6	6

Second round
3/4	(France) Victor Crouin	11	11	11
(Argentina) Juan Cortés	4	2	2
(Malaysia) Danial Nurhaqiem	11	11	4	11
(Australia) Lachlan Coxsedge	3	7	11	5
(United States) Tiber Worth	7	11	11	11
(Germany) Tobias Weggen	11	3	7	8
(United States) Eric Kim	8	9	11	9
13/16	(Malaysia) Darren Rahul Pragasam	11	11	2	11

Third Round
3/4	(France) Victor Crouin	11	11	11
(Malaysia) Danial Nurhaqiem	4	3	4
(United States) Tiber Worth	5	11	9	8
13/16	(Malaysia) Darren Rahul Pragasam	11	9	11	11

Fourth round
3/4	(France) Victor Crouin	11	11	11
13/16	(Malaysia) Darren Rahul Pragasam	6	6	0

==== Section 6 ====
First round
(Philippines) Rafa Yam	11	7	11	11	8
(South Africa) Murray Schepers	13	11	8	7	11

Second round
9/12	(Switzerland) Roman Allinckx	11	11	11
(South Africa) Murray Schepers	8	4	3
(Colombia) Luis Alejandro Mancilla	4	7	3
(Egypt) Aly Hussein	11	11	11
(South Korea) Lee In-woo	11	11	13	6	11
(Argentina) Juan Barreyro	6	5	15	11	8
(New Zealand) Matthew Lucente	9	8	5
5/8	(India) Adithya Raghavan	11	11	11

Third Round
9/12	(Switzerland) Roman Allinckx	6	4	5
(Egypt) Aly Hussein	11	11	11
(South Korea) Lee In-woo	5	6	11	9	11
5/8	(India) Adithya Raghavan	11	11	4	11

Fourth round
(Egypt) Aly Hussein	11	8	11	4	11
5/8	(India) Adithya Raghavan	3	11	7	11	3

==== Section 7 ====
First round
(Australia) Ethan Eyles	6	10	8
(South Africa) Mikael Ismail	11	12	11
(Argentina) Miguel Gonzalo Pujol	11	11	11
(Saudi Arabia) Nasser Alhazmi	0	4	8

Second round
5/8	(England) Kyle Finch	11	11	11
(South Africa) Mikael Ismail	4	5	3
(India) Tushar Shahani	3	9	8
(Malaysia) Hafiz Zhafri	11	11	11
(New Zealand) Quinn Udy	4	11	2	11	6
(Colombia) Inaki De Larrauri	11	7	11	5	11
(Argentina) Miguel Gonzalo Pujol	9	7	3
9/12	(Egypt) Mostafa Asal	11	11	11

Third Round
5/8	(England) Kyle Finch	11	11	11
(Malaysia) Hafiz Zhafri	6	3	4
(Colombia) Inaki De Larrauri	1	4	7
9/12	(Egypt) Mostafa Asal	11	11	11

Fourth round
5/8	(England) Kyle Finch	9	7	7
9/12	(Egypt) Mostafa Asal	11	11	11

==== Section 8 ====
First round
(New Zealand) Mitchell Kempton	11	11	11
(South Africa) Luke Van Vuuren	6	3	8

Second round
13/16	(Pakistan) Mansoor Zaman	11	11	10	6	9
(Colombia) Matías Knudsen	7	9	12	11	11
(India) Veer Chotrani	8	7	5
(Pakistan) Abbas Zeb	11	11	11
(United States) Salim Khan	6	11	11	11
(Australia) William Curtis	11	3	5	5
(New Zealand) Mitchell Kempton	11	4	7	3
2	(Jordan) Mohammad Al-Saraj	5	11	11	11

Third Round
(Colombia) Matías Knudsen	10	11	11	6	11
(Pakistan) Abbas Zeb	12	9	6	11	9
(United States) Salim Khan	7	9	10
2	(Jordan) Mohammad Al-Saraj	11	11	12

Fourth round
(Colombia) Matías Knudsen	7	11	8	10
2	(Jordan) Mohammad Al-Saraj	11	9	11	12

== See also ==
- 2017 Women's World Junior Squash Championships
- World Junior Squash Championships

Preceded by Poland (Bielsko-Biała); 2016	Squash World Junior; New Zealand (Tauranga); 2017	Succeeded by India (Chennai); 2018
