= 2019 Men's World Junior Squash Championships =

Men's World Junior 2019
- 27th WSF Men's World Junior Championship
- Location: (Malaysia) Kuala Lumpur
- Website www.wsfworldjuniors.com

Results
- Champion: (Egypt) Mostafa Asal
- Runner-up: (Egypt) Moustafa El Sirty
- Semi-finalists: (Egypt) Omar El Torkey (England) Lewis Anderson

The 2019 Men's World Junior Squash Championships was the men's edition of the 2019 World Junior Squash Championships, which serves as the individual world Junior championship for squash players. The event took place in Kuala Lumpur in Malaysia from 30 July to 4 August 2019.

Mostafa Asal of Egypt is the defending champion of this competition after defeating compatriot Marwan Tarek in the final of the 2018 edition.

== Seeds ==
The seeds was published on 12 July 2019.

1. [1*] (Egypt) Mostafa Asal (champion)
2. [2*] (Egypt) Omar El Torkey (semifinals)
3. [3/4*] (Czech Republic) Viktor Byrtus (third round)
4. [3/4*] (Egypt) Moustafa El Sirty (final)
5. [5/8*] (Malaysia) Siow Yee Xian (quarterfinals)
6. [5/8*] (Switzerland) Yannick Wilhelmi (fourth round)
7. [5/8*] (England) Sam Todd (quarterfinals)
8. [5/8*] (Egypt) Yehia Elnawasany (quarterfinals)
9. [9/12*] (New Zealand) Gabe Yam (second round)
10. [9/12*] (India) Veer Chotrani (quarterfinals)
11. [9/12*] (Egypt) Ibrahim Mohamed Ibrahim (fourth round)
12. [9/12*] (Canada) James Flynn (fourth round)
13. [13/16*] (France) Toufik Mekhalfi (second round)
14. [13/16*] (Egypt) Karim Elbarbary (fourth round)
15. [13/16*] (United States) Thomas Rosini (third round)
16. [13/16*] (Pakistan) Haris Qasim (third round)

== Draw and results ==
=== Finals ===
Quarter-finals
1 | (Egypt) Mostafa Asal | 11 | 11 | 11
5/8 | (Malaysia) Siow Yee Xian | 3 | 4 | 1
(England) Lewis Anderson | 11 | 11 | 9 | 11
9/12 | (India) Veer Chotrani | 8 | 9 | 11 | 7
5/8 | (England) Sam Todd | 6 | 7 | 11 | 5
3/4 | (Egypt) Moustafa El Sirty | 11 | 11 | 8 | 11
5/8 | (Egypt) Yehia Elnawasany | 6 | 2 | 3
2 | (Egypt) Omar El Torkey | 11 | 11 | 11

Semi-finals
1 | (Egypt) Mostafa Asal | 11 | 11 | 11
(England) Lewis Anderson | 5 | 5 | 2
3/4 | (Egypt) Moustafa El Sirty | 11 | 6 | 10 | 11 | 11
2 | (Egypt) Omar El Torkey | 8 | 11 | 12 | 8 | 7

Final
1 | (Egypt) Mostafa Asal | 12 | 11 | 11
3/4 | (Egypt) Moustafa El Sirty | 10 | 3 | 6

=== Top half ===
==== Section 1 ====
First round
(Czech Republic) Petr Nohel | 11 | 11 | 3 | 12
(Colombia) Andres Villamizar | 9 | 7 | 11 | 10
(Singapore) Aaron Liang | 11 | 11 | 11
(New Zealand) Riley-Jack Vette-Blomquist | 5 | 7 | 6
(Hong Kong) To Wai Lok | 11 | 9 | 4 | 12 | 11
(Malaysia) Darryl Gan | 5 | 11 | 11 | 10 | 8
(South Korea) Jung Tae-kyung | 8 | 4 | 12
(Kuwait) Hamoud Aljenaidel | 11 | 11 | 14

Second round
1 | (Egypt) Mostafa Asal | 11 | 11 | 11
(Czech Republic) Petr Nohel | 3 | 2 | 2
(England) Jared Carter | 6 | 11 | 12 | 11
(Singapore) Aaron Liang | 11 | 5 | 10 | 5
13/16 | (France) Toufik Mekhalfi | 11 | 11 | 8 | 3 | 8
(Hong Kong) To Wai Lok | 3 | 8 | 11 | 11 | 11
(United States) Ayush Menon | 11 | 11 | 11
(Kuwait) Hamoud Aljenaidel | 3 | 7 | 8

Third Round
1 | (Egypt) Mostafa Asal | 11 | 11 | 11
(England) Jared Carter | 9 | 5 | 4
(Hong Kong) To Wai Lok | 4 | 10 | 11 | 11 | 11
(United States) Ayush Menon | 11 | 12 | 8 | 9 | 8

Fourth round
1 | (Egypt) Mostafa Asal | 11 | 11 | 11
(Hong Kong) To Wai Lok | 5 | 5 | 4

==== Section 2 ====
First round
(Sweden) Fritiof Jacobsson | 12 | 10 | 11 | 6
(South Africa) Tristen Worth | 10 | 12 | 13 | 11
(Australia) Dylan Molinaro | 7 | 3 | 8
(Switzerland) Campbell Wells | 11 | 11 | 11
(United States) Nicholas Spizzirri | 11 | 11 | 11
(Germany) Nils Schwab | 2 | 7 | 9
(Pakistan) Hamza Khan | 11 | 11 | 14
(Canada) Sayeed Mavani | 5 | 7 | 12

Second round
5/8 | (Malaysia) Siow Yee Xian | 11 | 8 | 11 | 11
(South Africa) Tristen Worth | 9 | 11 | 4 | 7
(India) Tushar Shahani | 4 | 4 | 11 | 3
(Switzerland) Campbell Wells | 11 | 11 | 7 | 11
9/12 | (New Zealand) Gabe Yam | 6 | 8 | 7
(United States) Nicholas Spizzirri | 11 | 11 | 11
(United States) Dana Santry | 6 | 4 | 11 | 11 | 11
(Pakistan) Hamza Khan | 11 | 11 | 6 | 7 | 2

Third Round
5/8 | (Malaysia) Siow Yee Xian | 11 | 11 | 12
(Switzerland) Campbell Wells | 6 | 7 | 10
(United States) Nicholas Spizzirri | 11 | 11 | 11
(United States) Dana Santry | 8 | 5 | 8

Fourth round
5/8 | (Malaysia) Siow Yee Xian | 11 | 11 | 11
(United States) Nicholas Spizzirri | 6 | 6 | 7

==== Section 3 ====
First round
(Colombia) Nicolás Serna | 7 | 11 | 11 | 9 | 9
(Hong Kong) Wong King Yeung | 11 | 5 | 8 | 11 | 11
(New Zealand) Leo Fatialofa | 12 | 11 | 11
(Singapore) Leonard Lee | 10 | 5 | 4
(Australia) Ethan Eyles | 11 | 11 | 11
(Chinese Taipei) Pan Shao-yu | 5 | 2 | 1
(South Korea) Yu Jeong-min | 11 | 11 | 12
(Kuwait) Abdulaziz Jasem | 1 | 5 | 10

Second round
3/4 | (Czech Republic) Viktor Byrtus | 11 | 11 | 11
(Hong Kong) Wong King Yeung | 3 | 3 | 5
(England) Lewis Anderson | 11 | 11 | 12
(New Zealand) Leo Fatialofa | 1 | 7 | 10
13/16 | (Egypt) Karim Elbarbary | 11 | 11 | 11
(Australia) Ethan Eyles | 9 | 3 | 6
(United States) Dillon Huang | 11 | 11 | 12
(South Korea) Yu Jeong-min | 6 | 5 | 10

Third Round
3/4 | (Czech Republic) Viktor Byrtus | 9 | 15 | 4 | 11 | 6
(England) Lewis Anderson | 11 | 13 | 11 | 6 | 11
13/16 | (Egypt) Karim Elbarbary | 11 | 11 | 11
(United States) Dillon Huang | 4 | 1 | 5

Fourth round
(England) Lewis Anderson | 11 | 11 | 11
13/16 | (Egypt) Karim Elbarbary | 7 | 7 | 5

==== Section 4 ====
First round
(Brazil) Pedro Paulo Pedroso | 11 | 11 | 11
(Macau) Manuel Gassmann | 4 | 6 | 5
(Peru) Rafael Gálvez | 11 | 11 | 11
(Chinese Taipei) Chu Ching-hsuan | 4 | 3 | 1
(Australia) Joshua Penfold | 6 | 7 | 4
(Pakistan) Naveed Rehman | 11 | 11 | 11
(Canada) Darosham Khan | 11 | 11 | 11
(Singapore) Zacheus Yeo | 3 | 2 | 2

Second round
5/8 | (Switzerland) Yannick Wilhelmi | 11 | 11 | 11
(Brazil) Pedro Paulo Pedroso | 1 | 4 | 5
(India) Yash Fadte | 11 | 11 | 11
(Peru) Rafael Gálvez | 8 | 8 | 4
9/12 | (India) Veer Chotrani | 11 | 11 | 11
(Pakistan) Naveed Rehman | 7 | 9 | 8
(New Zealand) Elijah Thomas | 12 | 9 | 11 | 7
(Canada) Darosham Khan | 14 | 11 | 9 | 11

Third Round
5/8 | (Switzerland) Yannick Wilhelmi | 13 | 11 | 7 | 13 | 11
(India) Yash Fadte | 15 | 5 | 11 | 11 | 6
9/12 | (India) Veer Chotrani | 11 | 11 | 4 | 11
(Canada) Darosham Khan | 2 | 3 | 11 | 8

Fourth round
5/8 | (Switzerland) Yannick Wilhelmi | 12 | 6 | 8 | 3
9/12 | (India) Veer Chotrani | 10 | 11 | 11 | 11

=== Bottom half ===
==== Section 5 ====
First round
(Hong Kong) Ethan Tang | 6 | 11 | 14 | 11
(New Zealand) Glenn Templeton | 11 | 7 | 12 | 1
(Kuwait) Mohammad Karm | 11 | 11 | 9 | 9
(Colombia) Mateo Restrepo | 13 | 9 | 11 | 11
(Australia) Abel Sheng Jin | 9 | 11 | 12 | 11
(Singapore) Josiah Chong | 11 | 6 | 10 | 6
(Switzerland) Miguel Mathis | 11 | 11 | 8 | 10 | 5
(South Korea) Kim Seok-jin | 9 | 9 | 11 | 12 | 11

Second round
(Hong Kong) Ethan Tang | 5 | 8 | 9
(Malaysia) Amir Amirul | 11 | 11 | 11
(Colombia) Mateo Restrepo | 3 | 5 | 5
9/12 | (Egypt) Ibrahim Mohamed Ibrahim | 11 | 11 | 11
(Australia) Abel Sheng Jin | 7 | 4 | 4
(Malaysia) Danial Nurhaqiem | 11 | 11 | 11
(South Korea) Kim Seok-jin | 6 | 5 | 2
5/8 | (England) Sam Todd | 11 | 11 | 11

Third Round
(Malaysia) Amir Amirul | 9 | 11 | 7 | 9
9/12 | (Egypt) Ibrahim Mohamed Ibrahim | 11 | 8 | 11 | 11
(Malaysia) Danial Nurhaqiem | 10 | 5 | 7
5/8 | (England) Sam Todd | 12 | 11 | 11

Fourth round
9/12 | (Egypt) Ibrahim Mohamed Ibrahim | 8 | 4 | 11 | 9
5/8 | (England) Sam Todd | 11 | 11 | 4 | 11

==== Section 6 ====
First round
(Canada) Maaz Mufti | 6 | 9 | 7
(Pakistan) Farhan Hashmi | 11 | 11 | 11
(United States) Myles McIntyre | 11 | 11 | 11
(South Africa) Reece McLachlan | 6 | 6 | 4
(Chinese Taipei) Chen Wun-lin | 4 | 14 | 4 | 3
(Czech Republic) Karim Farrag | 11 | 12 | 11 | 11
(Germany) Jan Wipperfürth | 5 | 5 | 7
(Pakistan) Hamza Sharif | 11 | 11 | 11

Second round
(Pakistan) Farhan Hashmi | 6 | 11 | 11 | 11 | 11
(India) Arnaav Sareen | 11 | 13 | 9 | 4 | 6
(United States) Myles McIntyre | 9 | 8 | 8
13/16 | (United States) Thomas Rosini | 11 | 11 | 11
(Czech Republic) Karim Farrag | 2 | 2 | 2
(England) Max Forster | 11 | 11 | 11
(Pakistan) Hamza Sharif | 6 | 12 | 8
3/4 | (Egypt) Moustafa El Sirty | 11 | 14 | 11

Third Round
(Pakistan) Farhan Hashmi | 11 | 11 | 4 | 11
13/16 | (United States) Thomas Rosini | 9 | 7 | 11 | 8
(England) Max Forster | 4 | 4 | 5
3/4 | (Egypt) Moustafa El Sirty | 11 | 11 | 11

Fourth round
(Pakistan) Farhan Hashmi | 6 | 5 | 7
3/4 | (Egypt) Moustafa El Sirty | 11 | 11 | 11

==== Section 7 ====
First round
(Singapore) Jerome Aw | 9 | 11 | 9
(Kuwait) Bader Almoghrebi | 11 | 13 | 11
(South Korea) Kim Seung-hyeon | 11 | 4 | 11 | 6 | 7
(Australia) Gregory Chan | 6 | 11 | 4 | 11 | 11
(Pakistan) Noor Zaman | 11 | 11 | 9 | 11
(Canada) Matt Bicknell | 3 | 5 | 11 | 5
(Malaysia) Adam Agan Aziz | 11 | 11 | 11
(Hong Kong) Lap Au | 8 | 6 | 8

Second round
(Kuwait) Bader Almoghrebi | 8 | 6 | 11 | 2
(Malaysia) Duncan Lee | 11 | 11 | 9 | 11
(Australia) Gregory Chan | 1 | 2 | 5
9/12 | (Canada) James Flynn | 11 | 11 | 11
(Pakistan) Noor Zaman | 8 | 4 | 11 | 11 | 12
(Liechtenstein) David Maier | 11 | 11 | 7 | 5 | 10
(Malaysia) Adam Agan Aziz | 11 | 3 | 6 | 3
5/8 | (Egypt) Yehia Elnawasany | 6 | 11 | 11 | 11

Third Round
(Malaysia) Duncan Lee | 7 | 2 | 11 | 2
9/12 | (Canada) James Flynn | 11 | 11 | 8 | 11
(Pakistan) Noor Zaman | 9 | 7 | 12
5/8 | (Egypt) Yehia Elnawasany | 11 | 11 | 14

Fourth round
9/12 | (Canada) James Flynn | 11 | 9 | 7 | 11 | 6
5/8 | (Egypt) Yehia Elnawasany | 8 | 11 | 11 | 4 | 11

==== Section 8 ====
First round
(Kuwait) Mohammad Ali | 11 | 11 | 11
(South Korea) Raon Yi | 8 | 3 | 5
(Chinese Taipei) Huang Liang-yu | 5 | 1 | 4
(England) Ben Smith | 11 | 11 | 11
(Sweden) Samuel Lavebrink | 8 | 7 | 7
(Colombia) Juan José Torres | 11 | 11 | 11
(New Zealand) Willz Donnelly | 11 | 5 | 5 | 11 | 11
(Australia) Sam Sergo | 6 | 11 | 11 | 4 | 9
(Kuwait) Ali Eshniaf Al Shammiry | 6 | 2 | 5
(India) Rahul Baitha | 11 | 11 | 11
(Canada) Emilio Carrillo | 5 | 17 | 5
(South Korea) Lee Min-woo | 11 | 19 | 11

Second round
(Kuwait) Mohammad Ali | 3 | 6 | 6
(England) Ben Smith | 11 | 11 | 11
(Colombia) Juan José Torres | 3 | 2 | 1
13/16 | (Pakistan) Haris Qasim | 11 | 11 | 11
(New Zealand) Willz Donnelly | 7 | 8 | 8
(India) Rahul Baitha | 11 | 11 | 11
(South Korea) Lee Min-woo | 8 | 9 | 10
2 | (Egypt) Omar El Torkey | 11 | 11 | 12

Third Round
(England) Ben Smith | 8 | 2 | 11 | 11 | 11
13/16 | (Pakistan) Haris Qasim | 11 | 11 | 2 | 6 | 7
(India) Rahul Baitha | 9 | 2 | 4
2 | (Egypt) Omar El Torkey | 11 | 11 | 11

Fourth round
(England) Ben Smith | 8 | 9 | 6
2 | (Egypt) Omar El Torkey | 11 | 11 | 11

== See also ==
- 2019 Women's World Junior Squash Championships
- World Junior Squash Championships

| Preceded by India (Chennai); 2018 | Squash World Junior; Malaysia (Kuala Lumpur); 2018 | Succeeded by Australia (Gold Coast); 2020 |
