= 2024 Men's British Open Squash Championship =

Squash tournament

British Open
- Men's British Open

Details
- Event name: 2024 British Open
- Location: Birmingham, England
- Venue: Edgbaston Priory Club, Birmingham Repertory Theatre
- Dates: 2 June to 9 June 2024

Men's Winner
- Prize money: $194,500
- Year: 2023–24 PSA World Tour

The Men's 2024 British Open was the men's edition of the 2024 British Open Squash Championships, which is a 2023–24 PSA World Tour event. The event took place at the Edgbaston Priory Club, Birmingham Repertory Theatre in Birmingham in England between 2 June and 9 June 2024.

Egypt's Mostafa Asal won the title for the first time, after defeating the title holder Ali Farag.

== Draw and results ==
=== Semi-finals and final ===
Semi-finals
1	(Egypt) Ali Farag	11	11	11
9/16	(Wales) Joel Makin	3	9	7
4	(Egypt) Mostafa Asal	7	11	6	11	11
2	(New Zealand) Paul Coll	11	9	11	7	6

Final
1	(Egypt) Ali Farag	5	11	11	11	10
4	(Egypt) Mostafa Asal	11	2	13	4	12

=== Main Draw ===
==== Top half ====
First round
1	(Egypt) Ali Farag
[Bye]
(Egypt) Omar Mosaad	7	11	13	11	11
(United States) Shahjahan Khan	11	9	15	8	7
(France) Auguste Dussourd	3	3	12	11	11
(Scotland) Rory Stewart	11	11	10	9	9
(Egypt) Mohamed Abouelghar	11	11	10	7	11
(Egypt) Yahya Elnawasany	6	6	12	11	9
(Hungary) Balázs Farkas	11	11
(Egypt) Fares Dessouky	6	7	ret
(Switzerland) Dimitri Steinmann	10	11	12	6	11
(England) Curtis Malik	12	9	10	11	4
6	(Egypt) Mazen Hesham
[Bye]
(Hong Kong) Harry Leung	8	11	11	11
(Spain) Iker Pajares	11	6	2	3
8	(Egypt) Tarek Momen
[Bye]
9/16	(Wales) Joel Makin
[Bye]
(France) Grégoire Marche	4	11	11	11
(United States) Todd Harrity	11	2	6	2
(Egypt) Youssef Ibrahim	10	13	11	6	11
(England) Jonah Bryant	12	11	6	11	2
9/16	(Egypt) Youssef Soliman
[Bye]
(United States) Andrew Douglas	6	11	14	13
(Argentina) Leandro Romiglio	11	5	12	11
9/16	(France) Victor Crouin
[Bye]
3	(Peru) Diego Elías
[Bye]

Second round
1	(Egypt) Farag	11	11	11	11
(Egypt) Mosaad	3	ret
(France) Dussourd	7	4	7
(Egypt) Abouelghar	11	11	11
(Hungary) Balázs	11	11	4	11
(Switzerland) Steinmann	6	9	11	4
(Hong Kong) Leung	11	5	7	6
6	(Egypt) Hesham	5	11	11	11
8	(Egypt) Momen	7	8	4
9/16	(Wales) Makin	11	11	11
(France) Marche	11	2	9
(Egypt) Ibrahim	13	11	11
9/16	(Egypt) Soliman	11	11	11
(United States) Douglas	3	6	2
9/16	(France) Crouin	4	4	8
3	(Peru) Elías	11	11	11

Third round
1	(Egypt) Farag	11	16	11
(Egypt) Abouelghar	8	14	3
(Hungary) Balázs	10	11	3	11
6	(Egypt) Hesham	12	8	11	13
9/16	(Wales) Makin	11	10	9	11	11
(Egypt) Ibrahim	5	12	11	8	8
9/16	(Egypt) Soliman	4	6	10
3	(Peru) Elías	11	11	12

Quarter-finals
1	(Egypt) Farag	11	11	11
6	(Egypt) Hesham	7	5	5
Semi-finals
1	(Egypt) Farag	11	11	11
9/16	(Wales) Makin	3	9	7
9/16	(Wales) Makin	11	11	4	11
3	(Peru) Elías	9	9	11	8

==== Bottom half ====
First round
(England) Nick Wall	11	9	6	9
(Egypt) Karim El Hammamy	4	11	11	11
4	(Egypt) Mostafa Asal
[Bye]
9/16	(England) Marwan El Shorbagy
[Bye]
(Mexico) Leonel Cárdenas	8	11	7	11	11
(England) Simon Herbert	11	7	11	5	6
(United States) Timothy Brownell	12	11	18
(Mexico) César Salazar	10	6	16
9/16	(France) Baptiste Masotti
[Bye]
(Scotland) Greg Lobban	11	11	11
(India) Ramit Tandon	6	8	3
7	(England) Mohamed El Shorbagy
[Bye]
5	(Egypt) Karim Abdel Gawad
[Bye]
(Colombia) Juan Camilo Vargas	11	11	11
(England) Nathan Lake	9	6	4
9/16	(Malaysia) Ng Eain Yow
[Bye]
9/16	(Egypt) Aly Abou Eleinen
[Bye]
(Hong Kong) Alex Lau	16	14	12	8	11
(France) Sébastien Bonmalais	14	16	10	11	4
9/16	(Colombia) Miguel Rodríguez
[Bye]
(England) George Parker	8	11	4	11	11
(Switzerland) Nicolas Müller	11	8	11	8	7
2	(New Zealand) Paul Coll
[Bye]

Second round
(Egypt) El Hammamy	4	3	9
4	(Egypt) Asal	11	11	11
9/16	(England) El Shorbagy	11	11	11
(Mexico) Cárdenas	6	9	8
(United States) Brownell	11	11	11
9/16	(France) Masotti	9	9	4
(Scotland) Lobban	8	11	8	5
7	(England) El Shorbagy	11	8	11	11
5	(Egypt) Gawad	11	11	11
(Colombia) Vargas	7	9	12
9/16	(Malaysia) Ng	4	11	11	11
9/16	(Egypt) Eleinen	11	4	7	6
(Hong Kong) Lau	8	8	5
9/16	(Colombia) Rodríguez	11	11	11
(England) Parker	7	12	2	4
2	(New Zealand) Coll	11	10	11	11

Third round
4	(Egypt) Asal	11	11	11
9/16	(England) El Shorbagy	7	4	6
(United States) Brownell	w/o
7	(England) El Shorbagy	scr
5	(Egypt) Gawad	11	11	11	9	7
9/16	(Malaysia) Ng	6	3	11	12	11
9/16	(Egypt) Rodríguez	10	5	2
2	(New Zealand) Coll	12	11	11

Quarter-finals
4	(Egypt) Asal	11	11	11
(United States) Brownell	5	9	7
Semi-finals
4	(Egypt) Asal	7	11	6	11	11
2	(New Zealand) Coll	11	9	11	7	6
9/16	(Malaysia) Ng	7	4	3
2	(Egypt) Coll	11	11	11

== See also ==
- 2024 Women's British Open Squash Championship
