= 2017 Women's World Junior Squash Championships =

Women's World Junior 2017
- 25th WSF Women's World Junior Championship
- Location: (New Zealand) Tauranga
- Website www.wsfworldjuniors.com

Results
- Champion: (Egypt) Rowan Reda Araby
- Runner-up: (Egypt) Hania El Hammamy
- Semi-finalists: (Egypt) Amina Yousry (Japan) Satomi Watanabe

The 2017 Women's World Junior Squash Championships is the women's edition of the 2017 World Junior Squash Championships, which serves as the individual world Junior championship for squash players. The event took place in Tauranga in New Zealand from 19 to 24 July 2017.

== Seeds ==
1. [1*] (Egypt) Hania El Hammamy (final)
2. [2*] (Egypt) Zeina Mickawy (quarterfinals)
3. [3/4*] (Egypt) Nada Abbas (fourth round)
4. [3/4*] (Egypt) Rowan Reda Araby (champions)
5. [5/8*] (Malaysia) Andrea Lee (quarterfinals)
6. [5/8*] (Malaysia) Sivasangari Subramaniam (quarterfinals)
7. [5/8*] (Japan) Satomi Watanabe (semifinals)
8. [5/8*] (Egypt) Amina Yousry (semifinals)
9. [9/12*] (Malaysia) Zoe Foo Yuk Han (fourth round)
10. [9/12*] (Hong Kong) Lui Hiu Lam (fourth round)
11. [9/12*] (England) Elise Lazarus (fourth round)
12. [9/12*] (England) Lucy Turmel (fourth round)
13. [13/16*] (Malaysia) Aifa Azman (fourth round)
14. [13/16*] (India) Akanksha Salunkhe (third round)
15. [13/16*] (United States) Marina Stefanoni (quarterfinals)
16. [13/16*] (Malaysia) Chan Yiwen (fourth round)

== Draw and results ==
=== Finals ===
Quarter-finals
1	(Egypt) Hania El Hammamy	11	9	6	11	11
5/8	(Malaysia) Sivasangari Subramaniam	9	11	11	6	1
5/8	(Japan) Satomi Watanabe	13	12	11	9	11
13/16	(United States) Marina Stefanoni	15	10	8	11	4
3/4	(Egypt) Rowan Reda Araby	11	11	12	9	11
5/8	(Malaysia) Andrea Lee	8	13	10	11	6
5/8	(Egypt) Amina Yousry	12	13	11
2	(Egypt) Zeina Mickawy	10	11	8

Semi-finals
1	(Egypt) Hania El Hammamy	12	11	12
5/8	(Japan) Satomi Watanabe	10	4	10
3/4	(Egypt) Rowan Reda Araby	11	11	11
5/8	(Egypt) Amina Yousry	7	7	5

Final
1	(Egypt) Hania El Hammamy	7	9	8
3/4	(Egypt) Rowan Reda Araby	11	11	11

=== Top half ===
==== Section 1 ====
First round
(Republic of Ireland) Emma Lundy	4	5	7
(India) Ashita Bhengra	11	11	11

Second round
1	(Egypt) Hania El Hammamy	11	11	11
(India) Ashita Bhengra	2	1	3
(United States) Emme Leonard	5	7	8
(Hong Kong) Ho Ka Wing	11	11	11
(New Zealand) Kaitlyn Watts	11	11	11
(Australia) Courtney Mather	4	2	6
(South Africa) Danielle Shone	5	5	2
13/16	(Malaysia) Chan Yiwen	11	11	11

Third Round
1	(Egypt) Hania El Hammamy	11	11	11
(Hong Kong) Ho Ka Wing	4	3	2
(New Zealand) Kaitlyn Watts	4	7	4
13/16	(Malaysia) Chan Yiwen	11	11	11

Fourth round
1	(Egypt) Hania El Hammamy	11	11	11
13/16	(Malaysia) Chan Yiwen	3	5	4

==== Section 2 ====
First round
(India) Samita Sivakumar	11	11	12
(Germany) Eva Nistler	3	5	10
(South Korea) Song Dong-ju	11	12	11
(South Africa) Izane Louw	5	10	6

Second round
9/12	(Malaysia) Zoe Foo Yuk Han	13	11	11	11
(India) Samita Sivakumar	15	4	6	6
(Canada) Charlotte Orcutt	10	11	11	14
(France) Fanny Segers	12	9	9	12
(New Zealand) Anika Jackson	11	11	11
(Switzerland) Sarah Lüdin	8	6	7
(South Korea) Song Dong-ju	3	4	2
5/8	(Malaysia) Sivasangari Subramaniam	11	11	11

Third Round
9/12	(Malaysia) Zoe Foo Yuk Han	11	11	11
(Canada) Charlotte Orcutt	5	2	8
(New Zealand) Anika Jackson	4	2	5
5/8	(Malaysia) Sivasangari Subramaniam	11	11	11

Fourth round
9/12	(Malaysia) Zoe Foo Yuk Han	5	6	9
5/8	(Malaysia) Sivasangari Subramaniam	11	11	11

==== Section 3 ====
First round
(United States) Elle Ruggiero	11	17	11
(Canada) Andrea Toth	8	15	6

Second round
5/8	(Japan) Satomi Watanabe	11	9	11	11
(United States) Elle Ruggiero	6	11	2	7
(Germany) Saskia Beinhard	11	11	11
(Australia) Alexandra Haydon	6	6	7
(England) Alice Green	6	11	11	11
(Republic of Ireland) Ellie Mcveigh	11	7	3	3
(Colombia) Amalia Rios	5	3	4
9/12	(England) Lucy Turmel	11	11	11

Third Round
5/8	(Japan) Satomi Watanabe	11	11	11
(Germany) Saskia Beinhard	3	5	4
(England) Alice Green	5	4	7
9/12	(England) Lucy Turmel	11	11	11

Fourth round
5/8	(Japan) Satomi Watanabe	11	11	11
9/12	(England) Lucy Turmel	8	4	6

==== Section 4 ====
First round
(Australia) Jessica Osborne	9	2	8
(New Zealand) Camden Te Kani-Mcqueen	11	11	11

Second round
13/16	(United States) Marina Stefanoni	11	11	11
(South Africa) Teagan Roux	4	5	5
(France) Maelle Fuhrer	8	9	0
(England) Jasmine Hutton	11	11	11
(South Korea) Seo Hyo-ju	9	11	6	4
(India) Aishwarya Bhattacharya	11	9	11	11
(New Zealand) Camden Te Kani-Mcqueen	6	4	9
3/4	(Egypt) Nada Abbas	11	11	11

Third Round
13/16	(United States) Marina Stefanoni	14	11	11
(England) Jasmine Hutton	12	8	6
(India) Aishwarya Bhattacharya	4	11	11	6	3
3/4	(Egypt) Nada Abbas	11	8	9	11	11

Fourth round
13/16	(United States) Marina Stefanoni	12	7	11	11
3/4	(Egypt) Nada Abbas	10	11	7	9

=== Bottom half ===
==== Section 5 ====
First round
(Germany) Alice Kramer	10	5	6
(Australia) Grace Pattison	12	11	11

Second round
3/4	(Egypt) Rowan Reda Araby	11	11	11
(Australia) Grace Pattison	2	4	1
(United States) Laila Sedky	4	11	4	8
(Canada) Nicole Kendall	11	8	11	11
(Egypt) Jana Shiha	11	11	11
(South Korea) Song Chae-won	3	6	8
(France) Lauriane Maingot	5	2	11
13/16	(India) Akanksha Salunkhe	11	11	13

Third Round
3/4	(Egypt) Rowan Reda Araby	11	11	11
(Canada) Nicole Kendall	1	2	2
(Egypt) Jana Shiha	11	11	11
13/16	(India) Akanksha Salunkhe	6	8	4

Fourth round
3/4	(Egypt) Rowan Reda Araby	12	11	11
(Egypt) Jana Shiha	10	5	3

==== Section 6 ====
First round
(South Africa) Helena Coetzee	9	12	11	11
(Republic of Ireland) Lily Lloyd	11	10	7	4

Second round
9/12	(England) Elise Lazarus	11	11	11
(New Zealand) Rhiarne Taiapa	5	6	1
(Paraguay) Lujan Palacios	11	5	11	4
(Hong Kong) Chan Sin Yuk	8	11	13	11
(United States) Grace Doyle	11	11	11
(New Zealand) Lauren Aspinall	4	6	6
(South Africa) Helena Coetzee	4	2	2
5/8	(Malaysia) Andrea Lee	11	11	11

Third Round
9/12	(England) Elise Lazarus	11	11	11
(Hong Kong) Chan Sin Yuk	8	5	9
(United States) Grace Doyle	5	8	3
5/8	(Malaysia) Andrea Lee	11	11	11

Fourth round
9/12	(England) Elise Lazarus	9	8	8
5/8	(Malaysia) Andrea Lee	11	11	11

==== Section 7 ====
First round
(Republic of Ireland) Laura Neill	6	15	3	2
(South Africa) Jennifer Preece	11	13	11	11

Second round
5/8	(Egypt) Amina Yousry	11	11	11
(South Africa) Jennifer Preece	1	5	1
(Australia) Shehana Vithana	3	5	4
(Czech Republic) Kristýna Fialová	11	11	11
(Hong Kong) Cheng Nga Ching	5	11	11	11
(Germany) Kacenka Tycova	11	5	2	4
(New Zealand) Anna Hughes	2	8	0
9/12	(Hong Kong) Lui Hiu Lam	11	11	11

Third Round
5/8	(Egypt) Amina Yousry	11	11	11
(Czech Republic) Kristýna Fialová	2	5	5
(Hong Kong) Cheng Nga Ching	3	3	7
9/12	(Hong Kong) Lui Hiu Lam	11	11	11

Fourth round
5/8	(Egypt) Amina Yousry	11	4	11	11
9/12	(Hong Kong) Lui Hiu Lam	2	11	8	2

==== Section 8 ====
First round
(United States) Elisabeth Ross	12	15	11
(India) Sanya Vats	10	13	5

Second round
13/16	(Malaysia) Aifa Azman	11	11	11
(Canada) Emma Jinks	8	2	5
(France) Chloé Mourier	5	2	13
(India) Sunayna Kuruvilla	11	11	15
(South Africa) Faith Sithole	11	10	11	11
(New Zealand) Nadia Hubbard	8	12	2	6
(United States) Elisabeth Ross	11	7	4	7
2	(Egypt) Zeina Mickawy	9	11	11	11

Third Round
13/16	(Malaysia) Aifa Azman	11	11	11
(India) Sunayna Kuruvilla	4	6	6
(South Africa) Faith Sithole	6	3	7
2	(Egypt) Zeina Mickawy	11	11	11

Fourth round
13/16	(Malaysia) Aifa Azman	10	11	7
2	(Egypt) Zeina Mickawy	12	13	11

== See also ==
- 2017 Men's World Junior Squash Championships
- World Junior Squash Championships

Preceded by Poland (Bielsko-Biała); 2016	Squash World Junior; New Zealand (Tauranga); 2017	Succeeded by India (Chennai); 2018
