= Squash at the 2025 World Games – Men's singles =

Squash men's singles at the 2025 World Games
- Venue: Chengdu Hi-Tech Zone Sports Centre; Chengdu, China
- Dates: 8–12 August 2025
- Competitors: 31 from 20 nations

Medalists
gold medal	(France) Victor Crouin
silver medal	(Hungary) Balázs Farkas
bronze medal	(Colombia) Miguel Ángel Rodríguez

The men's singles squash competition at the 2025 World Games will take place from 8 to 12 August 2025 at the Chengdu Hi-Tech Zone Sports Centre in Chengdu, China.

== Competition format ==
A total of 31 athletes entered the competition. Players competed in classic cup system.

== Seeds ==
1. (France) Victor Crouin (Champion)
2. (Switzerland) Dimitri Steinmann (fourth place)
3. (Colombia) Miguel Ángel Rodríguez (third place)
4. (Germany) Raphael Kandra (round of 32)
5. (Hong Kong) Alex Lau (quarterfinals)
6. (Hungary) Balázs Farkas (runner-up)
7. (Hong Kong) Henry Leung (quarterfinals)
8. (Switzerland) Yannick Wilhelmi (quarterfinals)

== Results ==
Round of 32
(Croatia) Martin Kegel	0
(Japan) Ryunosuke Tsukue	3
(Guatemala) Alejandro Enríquez	3
(Czech Republic) Jakub Solnický	2
(Poland) Leon Krysiak	1
(Switzerland) Yannick Wilhelmi	2
5	(Hong Kong) Alex Lau	3
(Nigeria) Onaopemipo Adegoke	1
(China) Zhou Penglin	0
(Egypt) Mohamed Nasser	3
(Pakistan) Noor Zaman	3
(China) Chen Haisong	0
(China) Zhang Guanyu	0
3	(Colombia) Miguel Ángel Rodríguez	3
4	(Germany) Raphael Kandra	0
(Czech Republic) Viktor Byrtus	3
(Ukraine) Dmitry Shcherbakov	0
(South Africa) Dewald van Niekerk	3
(Colombia) Ronald Palomino	0
(Guatemala) Josué Enríquez	3
(China) Li Haizhen	0
6	(Hungary) Balázs Farkas	3
7	(Hong Kong) Henry Leung	3
(China) Zhu Xuanyi	0
(Romania) Radu Pena	0
(France) Toufik Mekhalfi	3
(Australia) Joseph White	3
(Austria) Daniel Lutz	0
(Pakistan) Nasir Iqbal	0
2	(Switzerland) Dimitri Steinmann	3

Round of 16
1	(France) Victor Crouin	3
(Japan) Ryunosuke Tsukue	1
(Guatemala) Alejandro Enríquez	1
(Switzerland) Yannick Wilhelmi	3
5	(Hong Kong) Alex Lau	3
(Egypt) Mohamed Nasser	0
(Pakistan) Noor Zaman	2
3	(Colombia) Miguel Ángel Rodríguez	3
(Czech Republic) Viktor Byrtus	3
(South Africa) Dewald van Niekerk	1
(Guatemala) Josué Enríquez	0
6	(Hungary) Balázs Farkas	3
7	(Hong Kong) Henry Leung	3
(France) Toufik Mekhalfi	1
(Australia) Joseph White	2
2	(Switzerland) Dimitri Steinmann	3

Quarter finals
1	(France) Victor Crouin	3
(Switzerland) Yannick Wilhelmi	0
5	(Hong Kong) Alex Lau	0
3	(Colombia) Miguel Ángel Rodríguez	3
(Czech Republic) Viktor Byrtus	0
6	(Hungary) Balázs Farkas	3
7	(Hong Kong) Henry Leung	0
2	(Switzerland) Dimitri Steinmann	3

Semi-finals
1	(France) Victor Crouin	3
3	(Colombia) Miguel Ángel Rodríguez	2
6	(Hungary) Balázs Farkas	3
2	(Switzerland) Dimitri Steinmann	0

Finals
1	(France) Victor Crouin	3
6	(Hungary) Balázs Farkas	0

3rd place
3	(Colombia) Miguel Ángel Rodríguez	3
2	(Switzerland) Dimitri Steinmann	0
