= 2018 Men's World Junior Squash Championships =

Men's World Junior 2018
- 26th WSF Men's World Junior Championship
- Location: (India) Chennai
- Website www.wsfworldjuniors.com

Results
- Champion: (Egypt) Mostafa Asal
- Runner-up: (Egypt) Marwan Tarek
- Semi-finalists: (Egypt) Mostafa El Serty (Egypt) Omar El Torkey

The 2018 Men's World Junior Squash Championships is the men's edition of the 2018 World Junior Squash Championships, which serves as the individual world Junior championship for squash players. The event took place in Chennai in India from 18 to 23 July 2018. Mostafa Asal won the tournament after defeating compatriot Marwan Tarek in the final.

== Seeds ==
1. [1*] (Egypt) Marwan Tarek (final)
2. [2*] (Egypt) Mostafa Asal (champions)
3. [3/4*] (Egypt) Omar El Torkey (semifinals)
4. [3/4*] (Egypt) Mostafa El Serty (semifinals)
5. [5/8*] (Mexico) Leonel Cárdenas (quarterfinals)
6. [5/8*] (Malaysia) Darren Rahul Pragasam (quarterfinals)
7. [5/8*] (Egypt) Mostafa Montaser (quarterfinals)
8. [5/8*] (England) Nicholas Wall (quarterfinals)
9. [9/12*] (Colombia) Matías Knudsen (fourth round)
10. [9/12*] (United States) Daelum Mawji (third round)
11. [9/12*] (England) James Wyatt (fourth round)
12. [9/12*] (Egypt) Yehia Elnawasany (fourth round)
13. [13/16*] (England) Curtis Malik (third round)
14. [13/16*] (Switzerland) Yannick Wilhelmi (fourth round)
15. [13/16*] (Canada) Julien Gosset (fourth round)
16. [13/16*] (Malaysia) Siow Yee Xian (fourth round)

== Draw and results ==
=== Finals ===
Quarter-finals
1 | (Egypt) Marwan Tarek | 11 | 11 | 11
5/8 | (Egypt) Mostafa Montaser | 8 | 1 | 5
5/8 | (England) Nicholas Wall | 6 | 3 | 7
3/4 | (Egypt) Omar El Torkey | 11 | 11 | 11
3/4 | (Egypt) Mostafa El Serty | 4 | 13 | 6 | 12 | 11
5/8 | (Malaysia) Darren Rahul Pragasam | 11 | 11 | 11 | 10 | 6
5/8 | (Mexico) Leonel Cárdenas | 10 | 7 | 9
2 | (Egypt) Mostafa Asal | 12 | 11 | 11

Semi-finals
1 | (Egypt) Marwan Tarek | 11 | 6 | 11 | 2 | 11
3/4 | (Egypt) Omar El Torkey | 9 | 11 | 8 | 11 | 8
3/4 | (Egypt) Mostafa El Serty | 3 | 7 | 7
2 | (Egypt) Mostafa Asal | 11 | 11 | 11

Final
1 | (Egypt) Marwan Tarek | 7 | 11 | 4
2 | (Egypt) Mostafa Asal | 11 | 13 | 11

=== Top half ===
==== Section 1 ====
First round
(Zimbabwe) Harry Lawton | 5 | 5 | 2
(India) Advait Adik | 11 | 11 | 11
(Australia) Nicholas Calvert | 11 | 11 | 5 | 12
(France) Toufik Mekhalfi | 7 | 6 | 11 | 10
(Malaysia) Amir Amirul | 11 | 11 | 11
(Iran) Amirhossein Feizpour | 6 | 6 | 8
(Canada) George Crowne | 11 | 11 | 11
(Finland) Elias Korhonen | 4 | 2 | 5
(Hong Kong) Ho Ka Hei | 11 | 11 | 8 | 11
(Argentina) Jeremias Azaña | 8 | 9 | 11 | 5
(Qatar) Ibrahim Darwish | 1 | 4 | 1
(Germany) Maximillian Baum | 11 | 11 | 11
(United States) Dillian Huang | 6 | 8 | 5
13/16 | (England) Curtis Malik | 11 | 11 | 11

Second round
1 | (Egypt) Marwan Tarek | 11 | 11 | 11
(India) Advait Adik | 5 | 7 | 7
(Australia) Nicholas Calvert | 4 | 12 | 11 | 4 | 3
(Malaysia) Amir Amirul | 11 | 10 | 7 | 11 | 11
(Canada) George Crowne | 12 | 11 | 11
(Hong Kong) Ho Ka Hei | 10 | 2 | 2
(Germany) Maximillian Baum | 3 | 7 | 5
13/16 | (England) Curtis Malik | 11 | 11 | 11

Third Round
1 | (Egypt) Marwan Tarek | 11 | 11 | 11
(Malaysia) Amir Amirul | 8 | 8 | 8
(Canada) George Crowne | 4 | 13 | 11 | 11
13/16 | (England) Curtis Malik | 11 | 11 | 4 | 6

Fourth round
1 | (Egypt) Marwan Tarek | 11 | 11 | 9 | 11
(Canada) George Crowne | 6 | 6 | 11 | 4

==== Section 2 ====
First round
(Singapore) Leonard Lee | 7 | 3 | 3
(Republic of Ireland) Sam Buckley | 11 | 11 | 11
(Saudi Arabia) Abdulelah Boureggah | 4 | 2 | 3
(South Africa) Keagan Waugh | 11 | 11 | 11
(Colombia) Nicolás Serna | 4 | 5 | 12 | 3
(New Zealand) Matthew Lucente | 11 | 11 | 10 | 11
(Scotland) Fraser Mccann | 3 | 3 | 4
(Switzerland) Nils Roesch | 11 | 11 | 11
(United States) Eric Kim | 8 | 10 | 10
(India) Rahul Baitha | 11 | 12 | 12
(Malaysia) Hafiz Zhafri | 11 | 6 | 12 | 11
(Pakistan) Uzair Shoukat | 5 | 11 | 10 | 5

Second round
9/12 | (Egypt) Yehia Elnawasany | 11 | 11 | 11
(Republic of Ireland) Sam Buckley | 2 | 6 | 6
(South Africa) Keagan Waugh | 3 | 6 | 4
(New Zealand) Matthew Lucente | 11 | 11 | 11
(Switzerland) Nils Roesch | 5 | 10 | 8
(India) Rahul Baitha | 11 | 12 | 11
(Malaysia) Hafiz Zhafri | 2 | 13 | 2
5/8 | (Egypt) Mostafa Montaser | 11 | 15 | 11

Third Round
9/12 | (Egypt) Yehia Elnawasany | 11 | 11 | 12 | 11
(New Zealand) Matthew Lucente | 5 | 5 | 14 | 5
(India) Rahul Baitha | 4 | 9 | 9
5/8 | (Egypt) Mostafa Montaser | 11 | 11 | 11

Fourth round
9/12 | (Egypt) Yehia Elnawasany | 11 | 9 | 7 | 11 | 10
5/8 | (Egypt) Mostafa Montaser | 9 | 11 | 11 | 8 | 12

==== Section 3 ====
First round
(Saudi Arabia) Osama Alotaibi | 3 | 2 | 0
(Argentina) Lisandro Ortiz | 11 | 11 | 11
(Republic of Ireland) Michael Creavan | 9 | 8 | 11 | 11 | 11
(Australia) Joel Arscott | 11 | 11 | 5 | 4 | 8
(United States) Tiber Worth | 11 | 11 | 11
(Singapore) Matthew Wong Yu Heng | 3 | 5 | 2
(Pakistan) Abbas Zeb | 11 | 11 | 11
(South Africa) Murray Schepers | 6 | 4 | 3
(Canada) Darosham Khan | 11 | 10 | 6 | 11 | 8
(New Zealand) Elijah Thomas | 4 | 12 | 11 | 1 | 11
(Finland) Atte Stengård | 5 | 6 | 4
(Scotland) Alasdair Prott | 11 | 11 | 11

Second round
5/8/ | (England) Nicholas Wall | 11 | 11 | 11
(Argentina) Lisandro Ortiz | 2 | 2 | 6
(Republic of Ireland) Michael Creavan | 11 | 11 | 6 | 13
(United States) Tiber Worth | 8 | 5 | 11 | 11
(Pakistan) Abbas Zeb | 11 | 11 | 11
(New Zealand) Elijah Thomas | 4 | 4 | 3
(Scotland) Alasdair Prott | 1 | 6 | 3
9/12 | (Colombia) Matías Knudsen | 11 | 11 | 11

Third Round
5/8 | (England) Nicholas Wall | 11 | 11 | 11
(Republic of Ireland) Michael Creavan | 4 | 4 | 7
(Pakistan) Abbas Zeb | 11 | 9 | 4 | 3
9/12 | (Colombia) Matías Knudsen | 4 | 11 | 11 | 11

Fourth round
5/8 | (England) Nicholas Wall | 11 | 9 | 11 | 11
9/12 | (Colombia) Matías Knudsen | 8 | 11 | 5 | 8

==== Section 4 ====
First round
13/16 | (Canada) Julien Gosset | 11 | 11 | 11
(New Zealand) Anthony Lepper | 9 | 6 | 4
(Mexico) Leonardo Vargas | 11 | 11 | 11
(Switzerland) Miguel Mathis | 5 | 5 | 4
(France) Adrien Douillard | 5 | 5 | 4
(Malaysia) Danial Nurhaqiem | 11 | 11 | 11
(England) Joshua Owen | 11 | 10 | 7 | 1
(Hong Kong) Chung Yat Long | 9 | 12 | 11 | 11
(Zimbabwe) Ethan Alfalfa Porter | 2 | 5 | 8
(Germany) Nils Schwab | 11 | 11 | 11
(Pakistan) Asadullah Khan | 11 | 7 | 11 | 4 | 4
(India) Utkarsh Baheti | 9 | 11 | 9 | 11 | 11
(Qatar) Mohammed Alyafei | 4 | 2 | 1
(Australia) Jacob Ford | 11 | 11 | 11

Second round
13/16 | (Canada) Julien Gosset | 13 | 11 | 11
(Mexico) Leonardo Vargas | 11 | 7 | 5
(Malaysia) Danial Nurhaqiem | 11 | 7 | 11 | 5 | 3
(Hong Kong) Chung Yat Long | 7 | 11 | 6 | 11 | 11
(Germany) Nils Schwab | 8 | 11 | 11 | 5 | 11
(India) Utkarsh Baheti | 11 | 7 | 9 | 11 | 7
(Australia) Jacob Ford | 5 | 2 | 6
3/4 | (Egypt) Omar El Torkey | 11 | 11 | 11

Third Round
13/16 | (Canada) Julien Gosset | 11 | 11 | 11
(Hong Kong) Chung Yat Long | 5 | 4 | 4
(Germany) Nils Schwab | 5 | 5 | 2
3/4 | (Egypt) Omar El Torkey | 11 | 11 | 11

Fourth round
13/16 | (Canada) Julien Gosset | 7 | 3 | 11 | 13 | 9
3/4 | (Egypt) Omar El Torkey | 11 | 11 | 9 | 11 | 11

=== Bottom half ===
==== Section 5 ====
First round
(France) Manuel Paquemar | 11 | 11 | 9 | 3 | 13
(Australia) Jack Hudson | 8 | 7 | 11 | 11 | 11
(Saudi Arabia) Mohammad Almwled | 5 | 5 | 3
(United States) Thomas Rosini | 11 | 11 | 11
(Finland) Samuli Niskala | 6 | 8 | 4
(Canada) Ryan Picken | 11 | 11 | 11
(England) Jared Carter | 7 | 11 | 6 | 14 | 11
(South Africa) Tristen Worth | 11 | 2 | 11 | 12 | 3
(Republic of Ireland) Gavin L'Estrange | 9 | 13 | 8 | 5
(Argentina) Dylan Tymkiw | 11 | 11 | 11 | 11
(Colombia) Luis Alejandro Mancilla | 11 | 11 | 5 | 11
(Switzerland) Campbell Wells | 8 | 3 | 11 | 4
(New Zealand) Temwa Chileshe | 13 | 11 | 3 | 2 | 7
13/16 | (Malaysia) Siow Yee Xian | 11 | 6 | 11 | 11 | 11

Second round
3/4 | (Egypt) Mostafa El Serty | 11 | 11 | 12
(France) Manuel Paquemar | 5 | 7 | 10
(United States) Thomas Rosini | 7 | 7 | 3
(Canada) Ryan Picken | 11 | 11 | 11
(England) Jared Carter | 11 | 11 | 11 | 11
(Argentina) Dylan Tymkiw | 6 | 4 | 13' | 5
(Colombia) Luis Alejandro Mancilla | 6 | 10 | 2
13/16 | (Malaysia) Siow Yee Xian | 11 | 12 | 11

Third Round
3/4 | (Egypt) Mostafa El Serty | 11 | 11 | 11
(Canada) Ryan Picken | 9 | 8 | 9
(England) Jared Carter | 12 | 5 | 4
13/16 | (Malaysia) Siow Yee Xian | 14 | 11 | 11

Fourth round
3/4 | (Egypt) Mostafa El Serty | 11 | 11 | 9 | 11
13/16 | (Malaysia) Siow Yee Xian | 7 | 9 | 11 | 9

==== Section 6 ====
First round
(South Africa) Jacques Duminy | 5 | 9 | 5
(Hong Kong) To Wai Lok | 11 | 11 | 11
(Zimbabwe) Aedan Martin | 6 | 2 | 6
(Germany) Abdel-Rahman Ghait | 11 | 11 | 11
(Singapore) Kieren Tan | 3 | 3 | 4
(India) Yash Fadte | 11 | 11 | 11
(Pakistan) Muhammad Farhan Hashmi | 11 | 11 | 11
(Qatar) Ahmad Al-Muraikhi | 2 | 1 | 7
(Republic of Ireland) Scott Gillanders | 8 | 2 | 11 | 7
(New Zealand) Gabe Yam | 11 | 11 | 8 | 11
(Scotland) Christopher Murphy | 11 | 11 | 6 | 3 | 11
(Iran) Mohammad Reza Jafarzadeh | 4 | 7 | 11 | 11 | 3

Second round
9/12 | (England) James Wyatt | 11 | 11 | 11
(Hong Kong) To Wai Lok | 6 | 5 | 7
(Germany) Abdel-Rahman Ghait | 12 | 7 | 7 | 6
(India) Yash Fadte | 10 | 11 | 11 | 11
(Pakistan) Muhammad Farhan Hashmi | 8 | 9 | 12
(New Zealand) Gabe Yam | 11 | 11 | 14
(Scotland) Christopher Murphy | 4 | 6 | 6
5/8 | (Malaysia) Darren Rahul Pragasam | 11 | 11 | 11

Third Round
9/12 | (England) James Wyatt | 11 | 11 | 5 | 11
(India) Yash Fadte | 8 | 6 | 11 | 9
(New Zealand) Gabe Yam | 10 | 11 | 9 | 11 | 5
5/8 | (Malaysia) Darren Rahul Pragasam | 12 | 5 | 11 | 2 | 11

Fourth round
9/12 | (England) James Wyatt | 11 | 7 | 13 | 11 | 7
5/8 | (Malaysia) Darren Rahul Pragasam | 7 | 11 | 15 | 1 | 11

==== Section 7 ====
First round
(France) Edwin Clain | 9 | 11 | 11 | 12
(Scotland) John Meehan | 11 | 3 | 9 | 10
(Pakistan) Haris Qasim | 11 | 11 | 11
(Australia) Ethan Eyles | 7 | 7 | 7
(Zimbabwe) Tayne Turnock | 9 | 11 | 8 | 7
(Colombia) Andres Villamizar | 11 | 8 | 11 | 11
(Republic of Ireland) Conor Moran | 9 | 6 | 6
(Canada) James Flynn | 11 | 11 | 11
(Argentina) Miguel Gonzalo Pujol | 11 | 11 | 9 | 12
(Qatar) Hamad Al-Amri | 5 | 6 | 11 | 10
(India) Sankalp Anand | 9 | 11 | 5 | 8
(Hong Kong) Chan Chi Ho | 11 | 9 | 11 | 11

Second round
5/8 | (Mexico) Leonel Cárdenas | 11 | 11 | 11
(France) Edwin Clain | 6 | 6 | 6
(Pakistan) Haris Qasim | 13 | 11 | 7 | 7 | 11
(Colombia) Andres Villamizar | 11 | 4 | 11 | 11 | 7
(Canada) James Flynn | 11 | 11 | 11
(Argentina) Miguel Gonzalo Pujol | 6 | 9 | 7
(Hong Kong) Chan Chi Ho | 6 | 4 | 5
9/12 | (United States) Daelum Mawji | 11 | 11 | 11

Third Round
5/8 | (Mexico) Leonel Cárdenas | 11 | 11 | 11
(Pakistan) Haris Qasim | 5 | 6 | 1
(Canada) James Flynn | 11 | 11 | 11
9/12 | (United States) Daelum Mawji | 9 | 7 | 9

Fourth round
5/8 | (Mexico) Leonel Cárdenas | 11 | 8 | 11 | 11
(Canada) James Flynn | 7 | 11 | 5 | 3

==== Section 8 ====
First round
13/16 | (Switzerland) Yannick Wilhelmi | 11 | 11 | 11
(United States) Ayush Menon | 8 | 4 | 5
(Saudi Arabia) Abdulmajeed Boureggah | 5 | 3 | 6
(Singapore) Aaron Liang | 11 | 11 | 11
(New Zealand) Leo Fatialofa | 8 | 11 | 6 | 4
(Pakistan) Muhammad Uzair | 11 | 9 | 11 | 11
(Malaysia) Duncan Lee Yung Yii | 7 | 11 | 10 | 11 | 9
(England) Sam Todd | 11 | 7 | 12 | 4 | 11
(Germany) Simon Tietz | 10 | 2 | 6
(South Africa) Mikael Ismail | 12 | 11 | 11
(India) Veer Chotrani | 11 | 11 | 11
(Australia) Maaz Khatri | 8 | 8 | 8
(Canada) Salaheldin Ahmed Eltorgman | 11 | 11 | 11
(Finland) Ville Koskinen | 3 | 3 | 2

Second round
13/16 | (Switzerland) Yannick Wilhelmi | 11 | 11 | 11 | 11
(Singapore) Aaron Liang | 13 | 3 | 6 | 11
(Pakistan) Muhammad Uzair | 9 | 11 | 9 | 9
(England) Sam Todd | 11 | 8 | 11 | 11
(South Africa) Mikael Ismail | 8 | 8 | 11
(India) Veer Chotrani | 11 | 11 | 13
(Canada) Salaheldin Ahmed Eltorgman | 11 | 2 | 2
2 | (Egypt) Mostafa Asal | 13 | 11 | 11

Third Round
13/16 | (Switzerland) Yannick Wilhelmi | 8 | 8 | 11 | 12 | 11
(England) Sam Todd | 11 | 11 | 8 | 10 | 6
(India) Veer Chotrani | 9 | 8 | 6
2 | (Egypt) Mostafa Asal | 11 | 11 | 11

Fourth round
13/16 | (Switzerland) Yannick Wilhelmi | 9 | 5 | 8
2 | (Egypt) Mostafa Asal | 11 | 11 | 11

== See also ==
- 2018 Women's World Junior Squash Championships
- World Junior Squash Championships

| Preceded by New Zealand (Tauranga); 2017 | Squash World Junior; India (Chennai); 2018 | Succeeded by Malaysia (Kuala Lumpur); 2019 |
