= Squash at the 2018 Asian Games – Men's singles =

Men's singles at the 2018 Asian Games
- Venue: Gelora Bung Karno Squash Stadium
- Dates: 23–26 August 2018
- Competitors: 32 from 17 nations

Medalists
gold medal	Leo Au	Hong Kong
silver medal	Max Lee	Hong Kong
bronze medal	Saurav Ghosal	India
bronze medal	Mohd Nafiizwan Adnan	Malaysia

The men's singles squash event was part of the squash programme and took place between 23 August and 26 August, at the Gelora Bung Karno Hall D.

== Schedule ==
All times are Western Indonesia Time (UTC+07:00)

Date	Time	Event
Thursday, 23 August 2018	10:00	Round of 32
Thursday, 23 August 2018	17:30	Round of 16
Friday, 24 August 2018	15:00	Quarterfinals
Saturday, 25 August 2018	17:00	Semifinals
Sunday, 26 August 2018	17:00	Gold medal match

== Results ==
=== Finals ===
Semifinals							Gold medal match
1	Saurav Ghosal (IND)	12	13	6	5	6
3	Leo Au (HKG)	10	11	11	11	11	3	Leo Au (HKG)	11	12	6	11
5	Mohd Nafiizwan Adnan (MAS)	11	11	5	5	9	2	Max Lee (HKG)	8	10	11	4
2	Max Lee (HKG)	5	6	11	11	11

=== Top half ===
==== Section 1 ====
Round of 32
1	Saurav Ghosal (IND)	11	11	11
Shamil Wakeel (SRI)	2	2	1
Arhant Keshar Simha (NEP)	6	5	5
10	Tayyab Aslam (PAK)	11	11	11
16	Robert Garcia (PHI)	11	11	11
Timothy Leong (SGP)	9	9	6
Ko Young-jo (KOR)	8	3	5
6	Harinder Pal Sandhu (IND)	11	11	11

Round of 16
1	Saurav Ghosal (IND)	11	11	11	11
10	Tayyab Aslam (PAK)	5	3	13	8
16	Robert Garcia (PHI)	4	11	10	13
6	Harinder Pal Sandhu (IND)	11	2	12	15

Quarterfinals
1	Saurav Ghosal (IND)	9	11	11	11
6	Harinder Pal Sandhu (IND)	11	7	7	7

==== Section 2 ====
Round of 32
7	Ivan Yuen (MAS)	11	11	11
Muhammad Nur Tastaftyan (INA)	2	5	2
Natthakit Jivasuwan (THA)	1	5	4
9	Asim Khan (PAK)	11	11	11
15	Liu Tsun Man (MAC)	12	11	3	4	4
Agung Wilant (INA)	10	9	11	11	11
Tomotaka Endo (JPN)	8	10	5
3	Leo Au (HKG)	11	12	11

Round of 16
7	Ivan Yuen (MAS)	11	11	12
9	Asim Khan (PAK)	9	8	10
Agung Wilant (INA)	3	3	4
3	Leo Au (HKG)	11	11	11

Quarterfinals
7	Ivan Yuen (MAS)	2	7	4
3	Leo Au (HKG)	11	11	11

=== Bottom half ===
==== Section 3 ====
Round of 32
4	Abdulla Al-Tamimi (QAT)	11	11	11
Davaasürengiin Bat-Oktyabri (MGL)	4	4	1
Phuwis Poonsiri (THA)	6	5	4
13	Ryunosuke Tsukue (JPN)	11	11	11
11	Syed Azlan Amjad (QAT)	11	11	11
Enkhboldyn Bat-Amgalan (MGL)	0	2	0
Ravindu Laksiri (SRI)	8	7	9
5	Mohd Nafiizwan Adnan (MAS)	11	11	11

Round of 16
4	Abdulla Al-Tamimi (QAT)	14	9	11	11
13	Ryunosuke Tsukue (JPN)	12	11	5	9
11	Syed Azlan Amjad (QAT)	6	7	7
5	Mohd Nafiizwan Adnan (MAS)	11	11	11

Quarterfinals
4	Abdulla Al-Tamimi (QAT)	9	10	11	11	9
5	Mohd Nafiizwan Adnan (MAS)	11	12	9	5	11

==== Section 4 ====
Round of 32
8	Ammar Al-Tamimi (KUW)	11	11	11
David Pelino (PHI)	2	3	9
Samuel Kang (SGP)	10	7	9
14	Alireza Shameli (IRI)	12	11	11
12	Sajjad Zareeian (IRI)	11	10	11	11
Lee Se-hyun (KOR)	3	12	5	5
Amrit Thapa Magar (NEP)	1	4	2
2	Max Lee (HKG)	11	11	11

Round of 16
8	Ammar Al-Tamimi (KUW)	11	10	11	11
14	Alireza Shameli (IRI)	5	12	8	8
12	Sajjad Zareeian (IRI)	6	5	5
2	Max Lee (HKG)	11	11	11

Quarterfinals
8	Ammar Al-Tamimi (KUW)	5	4	7
2	Max Lee (HKG)	11	11	11
