= Pakistan national squash team =

Pakistan national squash team may refer to:

- Pakistan men's national squash team
- Pakistan women's national squash team
