= 2016 Women's World Junior Squash Championships =

Women's edition of the 2016 World Junior Squash Championships

Women's World Junior 2016
- 24th WSF Women's World Junior Championship
- Location: (Poland) Bielsko-Biała
- Website www.wsfworldjuniors.com

Results
- Champion: (Egypt) Nouran Gohar
- Runner-up: (Egypt) Rowan Reda Araby
- Semi-finalists: (Egypt) Hania El Hammamy (Malaysia) Sivasangari Subramaniam

The 2016 Women's World Junior Squash Championships is the women's edition of the 2016 World Junior Squash Championships, which serves as the individual world Junior championship for squash players. The event took place in Bielsko-Biała in Poland from 6 to 11 August 2016. Nouran Gohar retain her World Junior title, defeating Rowan Reda Araby in the final.

== Seeds ==
1. [1*] (Egypt) Nouran Gohar (champions)
2. [2*] (Egypt) Hania El Hammamy (semifinals)
3. [3/4*] (Egypt) Rowan Reda Araby (final)
4. [3/4*] (Malaysia) Sivasangari Subramaniam (semifinals)
5. [5/8*] (England) Amelia Hanley (quarterfinals)
6. [5/8*] (Egypt) Amina Yousry (quarterfinals)
7. [5/8*] (Malaysia) Andrea Lee (quarterfinals)
8. [5/8*] (New Zealand) Eleanor Epke (quarterfinals)
9. [9/12*] (United States) Casey Wong (third round)
10. [9/12*] (Japan) Satomi Watanabe (third round)
11. [9/12*] (Belgium) Tinne Gilis (third round)
12. [9/12*] (Malaysia) Zoe Foo Yuk Han (third round)
13. [13/16*] (Switzerland) Céline Walser (third round)
14. [13/16*] (England) Lucy Turmel (second round)
15. [13/16*] (Hong Kong) Lui Hiu Lam (third round)
16. [13/16*] (United States) Marina Stefanoni (third round)

== Draw and results ==
=== Finals ===
Semi-finals
1	(Egypt) Nouran Gohar	11	11	11
3/4	(Malaysia) Sivasangari Subramaniam	4	6	5
3/4	(Egypt) Rowan Reda Araby	11	11	11
2	(Egypt) Hania El Hammamy	8	4	7

Final
1	(Egypt) Nouran Gohar	11	11	11
3/4	(Egypt) Rowan Reda Araby	5	6	7

=== Top half ===
==== Section 1 ====
First round
(Hong Kong) Chan Sin Yuk	11	9	11	11
(South Korea) Seo Hyo-ju	6	11	6	5
(Egypt) Zeina Mickawy	11	11	11
(United States) Mariam Kamal	4	8	7
(India) Sunayna Kuruvilla	6	6	8
9/16	(England) Lucy Turmel	11	11	11
9/16	(Malaysia) Zoe Foo Yuk Han	11	11	11
(Poland) Dominika Lubińska	1	1	3
(Czech Republic) Denisa Rohunová	8	9	9
(Australia) Jessica Graham	11	11	11
(South Africa) Faith Sithole	6	2	11	5
(Colombia) María Paula Tovar	11	11	9	11
(India) Ashita Bhengra	6	4	9
5/8	(New Zealand) Eleanor Epke	11	11	11

Second round
1	(Egypt) Nouran Gohar	11	11	11
(Hong Kong) Chan Sin Yuk	2	4	0
(Egypt) Zeina Mickawy	11	11	13
9/16	(England) Lucy Turmel	9	9	11
9/16	(Malaysia) Zoe Foo Yuk Han	11	11	11
(Australia) Jessica Graham	4	6	2
(Colombia) María Paula Tovar	9	5	9
5/8	(New Zealand) Eleanor Epke	11	11	11

Third Round
1	(Egypt) Nouran Gohar	11	11	11
(Egypt) Zeina Mickawy	6	5	3
9/16	(Malaysia) Zoe Foo Yuk Han	6	4	3
5/8	(New Zealand) Eleanor Epke	11	11	11

Quarter-finals
1	(Egypt) Nouran Gohar	11	11	11
5/8	(New Zealand) Eleanor Epke	1	1	3

==== Section 2 ====
First round
(Hong Kong) Cheng Nga Ching	9	5	4
(England) Elise Lazarus	11	11	11
(Czech Republic) Kristýna Fialová	11	11	11
(Zimbabwe) Carley Barton	5	1	4
(Iran) Ailee Nayeri	10	7	7
(United States) Casey Wong	12	11	11
(Switzerland) Céline Walser	11	12	11
(South Korea) Oh Seung-hee	1	10	7
(Pakistan) Sadia Gul	11	11	6	11
(Australia) Lauren Aspinall	6	7	11	7
(India) Jui Kalgutkar	11	6	6	5
(Germany) Saskia Beinhard	8	11	11	11

Second round
(Egypt) Amina Yousry	11	11	11
(England) Elise Lazarus	3	5	5
(Czech Republic) Kristýna Fialová	8	7	4
(United States) Casey Wong	11	11	11
(Switzerland) Céline Walser	11	11	6	13	11
(Pakistan) Sadia Gul	3	3	11	15	6
(Germany) Saskia Beinhard	3	5	3
(Malaysia) Sivasangari Subramaniam	11	11	11

Third Round
(Egypt) Amina Yousry	11	11	11
(United States) Casey Wong	9	7	3
(Switzerland) Céline Walser	17	3	7	7
(Malaysia) Sivasangari Subramaniam	15	11	11	11

Quarter-finals
(Egypt) Amina Yousry	11	9	11	7	7
(Malaysia) Sivasangari Subramaniam	6	11	5	11	11

=== Bottom half ===
==== Section 3 ====
First round
(Australia) Alexandra Haydon	9	11	11	7	6
(Iran) Fereshteh Eghtedari	11	9	7	11	11
(England) Jasmine Hutton	12	11	3	11
(India) Akanksha Salunkhe	10	2	11	7
(Poland) Emilia Kaniewska	7	2	2
(United States) Marina Stefanoni	11	11	11
(Japan) Satomi Watanabe	6	11	11	11
(England) Grace Gear	11	4	5	9
(Papua New Guinea) Lynette Vai	11	11	12
(Switzerland) Ambre Allinckx	3	9	10
(Czech Republic) Nikola Verisova	11	11	11
(Zimbabwe) Kuzivakwashe Madungwe	6	6	4
(Hong Kong) Tang Yan Yi	9	7	4
(Malaysia) Andrea Lee	11	11	11

Second round
(Egypt) Rowan Reda Araby	11	11	11
(Iran) Fereshteh Eghtedari	3	3	1
(England) Jasmine Hutton	9	13	9	11	9
(United States) Marina Stefanoni	11	11	11	7	11
(Japan) Satomi Watanabe	11	11	11
(Papua New Guinea) Lynette Vai	6	1	3
(Czech Republic) Nikola Verisova	3	1	2
(Malaysia) Andrea Lee	11	11	11

Third Round
(Egypt) Rowan Reda Araby	11	11	11
(United States) Marina Stefanoni	9	4	0
(Japan) Satomi Watanabe	11	7	10	11	3
(Malaysia) Andrea Lee	4	11	12	7	11

Quarter-finals
(Egypt) Rowan Reda Araby	11	11	9	11
(Malaysia) Andrea Lee	5	7	11	8

==== Section 4 ====
First round
(England) Amelia Hanley	11	11	11
(South Africa) Noel Lee	3	1	3
(Czech Republic) Karolina Füzy	11	8	4	11
(South Korea) Song Chae-won	9	11	11	13
(Australia) Grace Pattison	11	11	8	11
(Germany) Alice Kramer	3	8	11	3
(United States) Hayley Scott	8	4	11	1
(Belgium) Tinne Gilis	11	11	8	11
(Hong Kong) Lui Hiu Lam	9	11	12	11
(India) Adya Advani	11	9	10	8
(Singapore) Wai Yhann Au Yeong	3	4	5
(Malaysia) Aifa Azman	11	11	11
(United States) Grace Doyle	10	8	7
(Switzerland) Marija Shpakova	12	11	11

Second round
(England) Amelia Hanley	11	11	11
(South Korea) Song Chae-won	2	3	2
(Australia) Grace Pattison	1	1	6
(Belgium) Tinne Gilis	11	11	11
(Hong Kong) Lui Hiu Lam	9	13	11	11
(Malaysia) Aifa Azman	11	11	9	6
(Switzerland) Marija Shpakova	3	2	1
(Egypt) Hania El Hammamy	11	11	11

Third Round
(England) Amelia Hanley	12	11	8	11
(Belgium) Tinne Gilis	10	6	11	9
(Hong Kong) Lui Hiu Lam	6	2	2
(Egypt) Hania El Hammamy	11	11	11

Quarter-finals
(England) Amelia Hanley	7	7	7
(Egypt) Hania El Hammamy	11	11	11

== See also ==
- 2016 Men's World Junior Squash Championships
- World Junior Squash Championships

Preceded by Netherlands (Eindhoven); 2015	Squash World Junior; Poland (Bielsko-Biała); 2016	Succeeded by New Zealand (Tauranga); 2017
