= 2024 Women's British Open Squash Championship =

Squash tournament

British Open
- Women's British Open

Details
- Event name: 2024 British Open
- Location: Birmingham, England
- Venue: Edgbaston Priory Club, Birmingham Repertory Theatre
- Dates: 2 June to 9 June 2024

Women's Winner
- Prize money: $194,500
- Year: 2023–24 PSA World Tour

The Women's 2024 British Open was the women's edition of the 2024 British Open Squash Championships, which is a 2023–24 PSA World Tour event. The event took place at the Edgbaston Priory Club, Birmingham Repertory Theatre in Birmingham in England between 2 June and 9 June 2024.

Egypt's Nouran Gohar won the title for the second time.

== Draw and results ==
=== Semi-finals and final ===
Semi-finals
1	(Egypt) Nour El Sherbini	11	11	10	11
5	(Egypt) Nour El Tayeb	9	5	12	4
3	(Egypt) Nouran Gohar	11	11	11	11
2	(Egypt) Hania El Hammamy	13	4	3	8

Final
1	(Egypt) Nour El Sherbini	6	15	11	11	4
3	(Egypt) Nouran Gohar	11	17	3	7	11

=== Main Draw ===
==== Top half ====
First round
1	(Egypt) Nour El Sherbini
[Bye]
9/16	(Malaysia) Siva Subramaniam
[Bye]
(Egypt) Zeina Mickawy	11	11	5	9	11
(Egypt) Salma El Tayeb	7	8	11	11	8
9/16	(Japan) Satomi Watanabe
[Bye]
9/16	(United States) Sabrina Sobhy
[Bye]
(Egypt) Hana Moataz	14	11	11
(England) Alicia Mead	12	6	8
8	(United States) Olivia Weaver
[Bye]
(England) Lucy Turmel	11	11	8	11
(Egypt) Haya Ali	3	1	11	0
5	(Egypt) Nour El Tayeb
[Bye]
(Malaysia) Rachel Arnold	11	4	9	11	11
(Hong Kong) Tong Tsz Wing	7	11	11	6	7
(Egypt) Hana Ramadan	11	11	11
(France) Énora Villard	3	4	3
(Egypt) Nour Aboulmakarim	6	11	6	11	11
(Egypt) Nadine Shahin	11	9	11	6	5
9/16	(Egypt) Salma Hany
[Bye]
9/16	(Egypt) Farida Mohamed
[Bye]
(Canada) Hollie Naughton	11	10	11	11
(England) Asia Harris	6	12	6	4
4	(Belgium) Nele Gilis
[Bye]

Second round
1	(Egypt) El Sherbini	11	11	11
9/16	(Malaysia) Subamaniam	9	8	6
9/16	(Japan) Watanabe	11	11	11
(Egypt) Mickawy	5	7	7
9/16	(United States) Sobhy	8	11	11	11
(Egypt) Moataz	11	8	2	8
8	(United States) Weaver	11	11	11
(England) Turmel	4	8	6
5	(Egypt) El Tayeb	9	11	11	11
(Malaysia) Arnold	11	9	3	3
(Egypt) Ramadan	11	11	15
(Egypt) Aboulmakarim	9	3	13
9/16	(Egypt) Hany	11	4	11	6	11
9/16	(Egypt) Mohamed	6	11	4	11	9
(Canada) Naughton	17	8	11	7	5
4	(Belgium) Gilis	15	11	5	11	11

Third round
1	(Egypt) El Sherbini	11	9	11	11
9/16	(Japan) Watanabe	2	11	3	3
9/16	(United States) Sobhy	8	11	11	3	6
8	(United States) Weaver	11	9	7	11	11
5	(Egypt) El Tayeb	11	11	11
(Egypt) Ramadan	3	5	4
9/16	(Egypt) Hany	14	11	11
4	(Belgium) Gilis	12	5	8

Quarter-finals
1	(Egypt) El Sherbini	11	11	8	11
8	(United States) Weaver	3	8	11	5
Semi-finals
1	(Egypt) El Sherbini	11	11	10	11
5	(Egypt) El Tayeb	9	5	12	4
5	(Egypt) El Tayeb	7	6	11	11	11
9/16	(Egypt) Hany	11	11	6	3	9

==== Bottom half ====
First round
3	(Egypt) Nouran Gohar
[Bye]
(England) Katie Malliff	11	11
(Wales) Emily Whitlock	2	4	ret
(Egypt) Malak Khafagy	9	11	11	6	11
(France) Mélissa Alves	11	6	7	11	9
(Hong Kong) Tomato Ho	12	11	11
(Hong Kong) Lee Ka Yi	10	3	8
(Malaysia) Aifa Azman	11	8	11	11
(England) Torrie Malik	8	11	7	6
(Egypt) Fayrouz Aboelkheir	11	8	13	11
(Malaysia) Aira Azman	8	11	11	5
6	(England) Georgina Kennedy
[Bye]
(Scotland) Georgia Adderley	7	11	11	4	11
(Egypt) Kenzy Ayman	11	7	8	11	6
7	(Belgium) Tinne Gilis
[Bye]
(England) Jasmine Hutton	11	11	11
(France) Marie Stephan	6	8	3
9/16	(England) Sarah-Jane Perry
[Bye]
(Wales) Tesni Murphy	11	11	11
(Canada) Nicole Bunyan	1	4	6
(England) Grace Gear	11	11	11
(Egypt) Mariam Metwally	2	2	7	11	4
9/16	(Egypt) Nada Abbas
[Bye]
9/16	(Egypt) Rowan Reda Araby
[Bye]
2	(Egypt) Hania El Hammamy
[Bye]

Second round
3	(Egypt) Gohar	11	11	11
(England) Malliff	5	4	8
(Egypt) Khagafy	12	11	6	7	9
(Hong Kong) Ho	10	7	11	11	11
(Malaysia) Azman	8	11	6	11	5
(Egypt) Aboelkheir	11	7	11	6	11
6	(England) Kennedy	7	11	10	11	11
(Scotland) Adderley	11	3	12	4	5
7	(Belgium) Gillis	11	11	7	13
(England) Hutton	5	2	11	11
9/16	(England) Perry	8	4	11	13	11
(Wales) Murphy	11	11	11	9
9/16	(Egypt) Abbas	11	10	11	11
(England) Gear	5	12	4	2
9/16	(England) Elaraby	9	11	5
2	(Egypt) El Hammamy	11	13	11

Third round
3	(Egypt) Gohar	11	11	11
(Hong Kong) Ho	2	3	1
(Egypt) Aboelkheir	8	4	14	6
6	(England) Kennedy	11	11	12	11
7	(Belgium) Gilis	11	11	11
9/16	(England) Perry	5	7	4
9/16	(Egypt) Abbas	9	1	8
2	(Egypt) El Hammamy	11	11	11

Quarter-finals
3	(Egypt) Gohar	11	11	11
6	(England) Kennedy	8	1	4
Semi-finals
3	(Egypt) Gohar	11	11	11	11
2	(Egypt) El Hammamy	13	4	3	8
7	(Belgium) Gilis	6	7	9
2	(Egypt) El Hammamy	11	11	11

== See also ==
- 2024 Men's British Open Squash Championship
