= Eleanor Epke =

English-born New Zealand squash player

Personal information
- Born: Bristol, England

Sport
- Country: New Zealand
- Racquet used: Karakal

Women's singles
- Highest ranking: 118 (June 2016)
- Current ranking: 285 (August 2019)

Eleanor Epke also known as Ellie Epke (born 6 January 1998) is an English born New Zealand female squash player. She achieved her highest career PSA singles ranking of 118 in June 2016. She initially had a brief stint as junior player for England before moving to New Zealand where she went onto pursue her career.

== Career ==
She started playing squash in international arenas since the age of 13 at junior level competitions such as 2013 Women's World Junior Squash Championships, 2016 Women's World Junior Squash Championships and in British Junior Open Squash 2012. She was regarded as a prodigy after emerging as New Zealand domestic women's singles champion in five consecutive years from 2009 to 2014
