= Andrea Lee =

Andrea Lee may refer to:

- Andrea Lee (author) (born 1953), American author
- Andrea Lee (squash player) (born 1998), Malaysian squash player
- Andrea Lee (fighter) (born 1989), American fighter
- Andrea Lee (golfer) (born 1998), American golfer
