= Céline Walser =

Swiss squash player (born 1998)

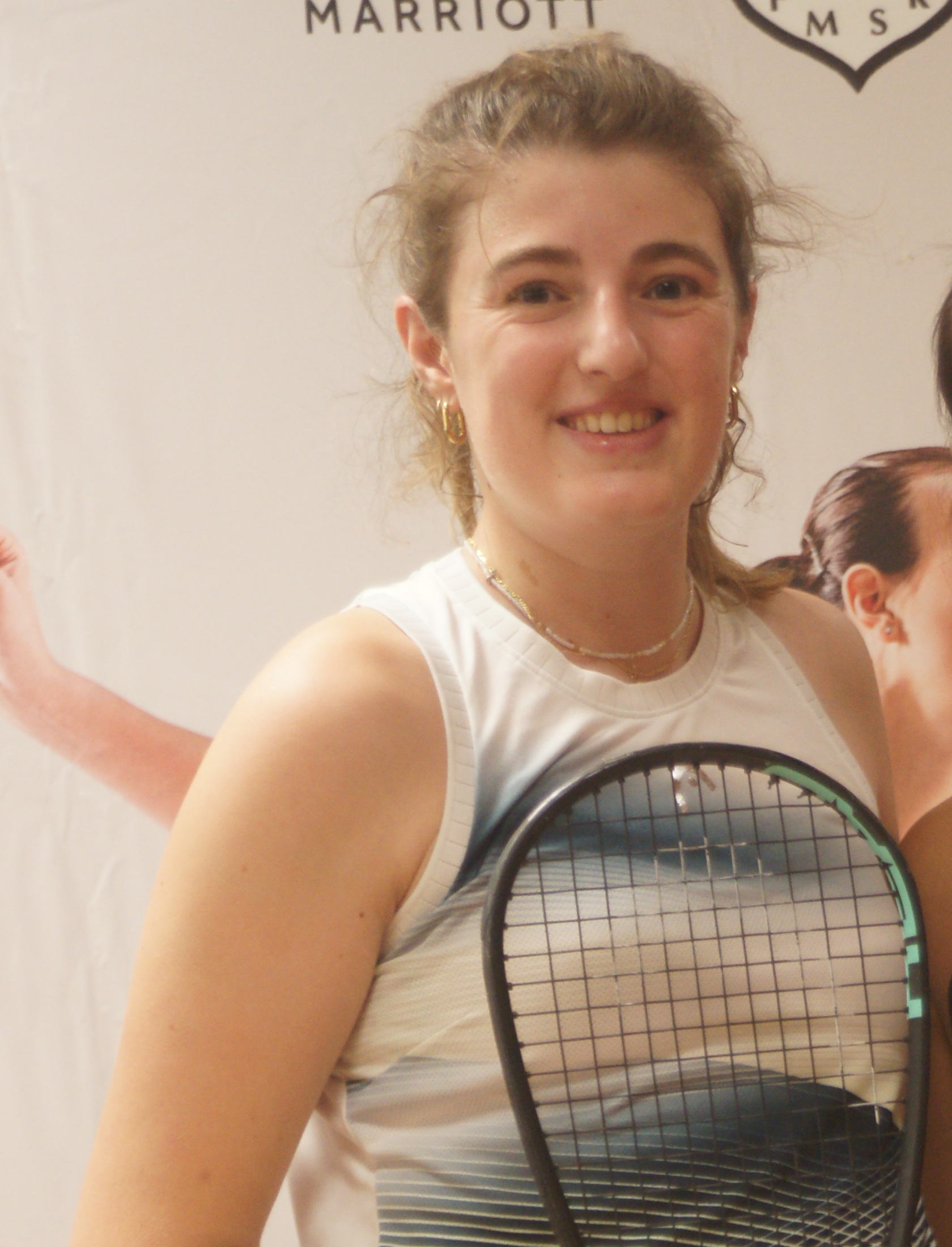
- Céline Walser, Monte Carlo Squash Classic 2023

Personal information
- Born: May 31, 1998 (age 28) Liestal, Switzerland

Sport
- Country: Switzerland
- Handedness: Right Handed
- Retired: Active
- Racquet used: Tecnifibre

Women's singles
- Highest ranking: No. 88 (February 2022)
- Current ranking: No. 309 (October 2024)
- Updated on October 2024

Céline Walser (born 31 May 1998 in Liestal) is a Swiss professional squash player. She reached her career-high ranking of number 88 in the world in February 2022.
