= Song Dong-ju =

South Korean squash player (born 1999)

Personal information
- Born: May 29, 1999 (age 27) Goyang, South Korea

Sport
- Country: South Korea
- Handedness: Right-handed
- Turned pro: 2018
- Retired: Active

Women's singles
- Highest ranking: No. 208 (January 2018)
- Current ranking: No. 280 (July 2023)
- Updated on July 2023

Song Dong-ju (Korean: 송동주; born 29 May 1999 in Goyang) is a South Korean professional squash player. As of July 2023, she was ranked number 280 in the world. She won the 2023 Bendigo International tournament of the world tour.
