= Balázs Farkas (squash player) =

Hungarian squash player (born 1997)

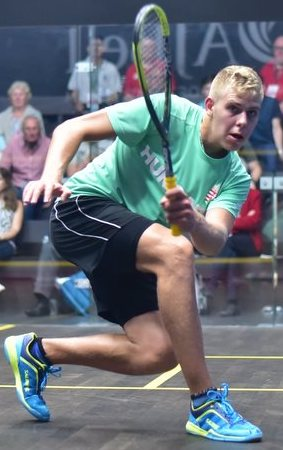

Personal information
- Born: 2 April 1997 (age 29) Tatabánya, Hungary
- Height: 194 cm (6 ft 4 in)
- Weight: 84 kg (185 lb)

Sport
- Country: Hungary
- Turned pro: 2017
- Coached by: Janos Farkas
- Retired: Active
- Racquet used: Head

Men's singles
- Highest ranking: No. 36 (September 2024)
- Current ranking: No. 37 (December 2024)
Medal record
Men's squash
Representing Hungary
World Games
Silver medal – second place	2025 Chengdu	Singles

Balázs Farkas (born 2 April 1997) is a Hungarian professional squash player. He reached a career high ranking of 36 in the world during September 2024. As of November 2018, he was number 1 in Hungary. He won the 2018 Airport Xmas Challenger professional tournament, beating Spaniard Carlos Cornes Ribadas in the 5-game final. He also won the 2022 Odense Open, beating seeded players Ben Coleman, Faraz Khan and, in the final, Sam Todd.

== Results ==
- Squash at the 2025 World Games – Men's singles
