= Anna Hughes =

- Born: 8 January 1983 (age 43)
- Occupation: Director of Flight Free UK
- Website: www.annacycles.co.uk

Anna Hughes (born 8 January 1983) is a cyclist, author, and sustainable transport campaigner. She is currently the Director of Flight Free UK as well as being on the board of the charity Population Matters.

== Career ==
Hughes worked as a teacher, before taking a job as a Bike It Officer at the travel charity Sustrans in 2009. She then worked as a freelance cycle instructor and bike doctor in London before becoming the director of the Flight Free UK campaign.

== Cyclist ==
In 2011 Hughes cycled 4,000 miles around the coast of Britain over 10 weeks, a route she repeated by sailboat in 2013. She then rode from Land's End to John O Groats in 2015, and 1000 km from Dieppe to Nice in 2019. Hughes has also written several books about cycling, including Eat, Sleep, Cycle (2015), which documents her 2011 ride around Britain, and Pedal Power (2017), a collection of "inspirational stories from riders around the world". Hughes was included in Cycling UK's 2019 list of 100 Women in Cycling for her "inspirational writing on cycling".

== Sustainable travel campaigner ==
In February 2019 Hughes founded the Flight Free UK campaign, based on the Swedish Flygfritt campaign in which over 14,000 people pledged to not fly during 2019. The Swedish campaign for 2019 was started by neighbours Maja Rosen and Lotta Hammar. The UK campaign asks UK residents to pledge not to fly in 2020, in what Hughes has described as "sort of Veganuary for aviation". The organisation also campaigns to lower the relative cost of alternatives to flying. As director of the campaign Hughes has criticised the idea of lowering of the Air Passenger Duty Tax and continued development of long haul flight routes. She has also called on organisers of Stag and Hen dos to find alternative ways to travel, such as trains, and criticised the UK Government under Boris Johnson for "fundamental lack of understanding" of climate issues.

Hughes also advocates for sustainable forms of travel in her roles as an ambassador for the clothing company BAM, a Berghaus Everyday Adventurer, and a Get Outside Champion for the Ordnance Survey.

== Books ==
- Eat Sleep Cycle: a bike ride around the coast of Britain (2015)
- Pedal Power: inspirational stories from the world of cycling (2017)
- Peaky Climbers: how eight amateur cyclists became kings of the mountains (2018)
