= Charlie Lee (squash player) =

English professional squash player (born 1998)

Personal information
- Born: 13 May 1998 (age 28) Kingston-upon-Thames, England

Sport
- Country: England
- Handedness: Right Handed
- Turned pro: 2015
- Retired: Active
- Highest ranking: No. 43 (September 2023)
- Current ranking: No. 62 (June 2025)
Medal record
Men's squash
Representing England
European Team Championships
Gold medal – first place	2023 Helsinki	Team

Charlie Lee (born 13 May 1998) is an English professional squash player. He reached a career high ranking of 43 in the world during September 2023.

== Biography ==
Lee was the English Champion at the age levels of U15, U17 and U19. In March 2023, he hit a career best world ranking (at the time) of 46 and improved this further to 43 in September 2023.

He was a member of the England team that won the 2023 European Squash Team Championships in Helsinki. In 2024, Lee won his 2nd PSA title after securing victory in the Madeira International.
