= Abbas Shoukat =

Pakistani squash player (born 1998)

Personal information
- Born: 13 April 1998 (age 28) Peshawar, Pakistan

Sport
- Country: Pakistan
- Racquet used: Technifibre

men's singles
- Highest ranking: 214 (January 2016)

Abbas Shoukat (born 13 April 1998) is a Pakistani male professional squash player. He achieved his highest career ranking of 214 in January 2016 during the 2016 PSA World Tour.
