= Veer Chotrani =

Indian squash player (born 2001)

Personal information
- Born: 25 October 2001 (age 24) Mumbai, India
- Education: Cornell University; Jamnabai Narsee
- Height: 1.78 m (5 ft 10 in)
- Weight: 75 kg (165 lb)

Sport
- Country: India
- Handedness: Right-handed
- Club: Atlanta Tornados; (2025–present); Cornell Big Red; (2019–2024)
- Coached by: David Palmer
- Retired: Active
- Racquet used: Ashaway

Men's singles
- Highest ranking: 49 (October 2025)
- Current ranking: 49 (October 2025)
- Title: 8
- Tour final: 11
- PSA Profile
Medal record
Men's squash
Representing India
Asian Junior Championships
Gold medal – first place	2014 Kish Island	Singles
Gold medal – first place	2019 Macau	Singles
Silver medal – second place	2013 Amman	Singles

Veer Chotrani (born 25 October 2001) is an Indian squash player who is a member of the national team. As of October 2025, he is ranked 49th in the world.

== Early life ==
Chotrani was born on 25 October 2001 in Mumbai to Meera and Manish Chotrani. His father is a former two-time national squash champion. He also has a younger sister Jiya. Chotrani first started playing squash when he was six years of age. He finished his schooling from Jamnabai Narsee School.

In 2019, Chotrani moved to the United States to pursue academics. He excelled at the college squash circuit and was named the Ivy League Rookie of the Year at Cornell University during his freshman year. In his senior season, he was unanimously awarded the Ivy League Player of the Year award and became the first squash player from Cornell to win the College Squash Individual National Championships. Chotrani also won the Skillman Award for demonstrating outstanding sportsmanship and maintaining a high level of play. He is being coached by David Palmer since 2019.

== Career ==
Chotrani has won two Asian Junior Individual Championship titles with one being under-13 and the other being under-19. He became the third Indian to win the under-19 title after Ravi Dixit and Velavan Senthilkumar.

== Titles and finals ==
Year	Tournament	Opponent	Result	Score	Ref
2014	Hong Kong Junior Open	(India) Yash Fadte	Win	3–1 (14–12, 8–11, 11–7, 11–8)	
2023	QuantiFi LifeTime MetroWest	(Egypt) Mohamed Sharaf	Win	3–1 (11–6, 12–10, 5–11, 11–4)	
2023	Rhode Island Open	(Australia) Joseph White	Win	3–0 (11–6, 11–9, 11–5)	
2023	Edmonton Open	(Czech Republic) Viktor Byrtus	Loss	1–3 (11–4, 1–11, 5–11, 8–11)	
2023	Greenwich Open	(Egypt) Seif Shenawy	Win	3–2 (11–8, 11–5, 10–12, 6–11, 11–3)	
2024	Kanso Open	(Pakistan) Ashab Irfan	Loss	2–3 (7–11, 11–8, 10–12, 11–8, 8–11)	
2024	QuantiFi LifeTime MetroWest	(Malaysia) Yee Xian Siow	Win	3–0 (11–6, 11–6, 11–6)	
2024	White Oaks Cup	(Canada) Salah Eltorgman	Win	3–0 (11–6, 11–2, 11–9)	
2024	Costa Rica Open	(Colombia) Ronald Palomino	Loss	1–3 (8–11, 11–7, 3–11, 6–11)	
2025	SRFI Indian Tour	(France) Melvil Scianimanico	Win	3–1 (3–11, 12–10, 11–6, 11–7)	
2025	HCL Squash Indian Tour	(Hong Kong) Wong Chi Him	Win	3–0 (11–6, 11–5, 11–7)	
2025	St. James Expression Open	(Mexico) Leonel Cárdenas			

== Awards and nominations ==
Year	Award	Category	Result	Ref
2019	ASF Awards	Outstanding Performance Junior Men	Won	
2025	PSA Awards	Challenger Player of the Year	Nominated	

== See also ==
- Squash in India
- India men's national squash team
