= Sajjad Zareeian =

Iranian squash player (born 1997)

Personal information
- Born: September 22, 1997 (age 28) Tehran, Iran

Sport
- Country: Iran
- Handedness: Right Handed
- Retired: Active
- Racquet used: oliever

Men's singles
- Highest ranking: No. 138 (March 2019)
- Current ranking: not ranked (August 2026)
- Updated on February, 2021

Sajjad Zareeian Jahromi (Persian: سجاد زارعیان جهرمی; born 1997, in Tehran) is an Iranian professional squash player. As of February 2018, he was ranked number 143 in the world; he is not ranked as of August 2026.
