= Ahsan Ayaz =

Pakistani squash player (born 1998)

Personal information
- Full name: Ahsan Ayaz
- Born: October 5, 1998 (age 27) Peshawar, Pakistan
- Height: 176 cm (5 ft 9 in)
- Weight: 62 kg (137 lb)

Sport
- Country: Pakistan
- Handedness: Left Handed
- Retired: Active
- Racquet used: Prince

Men's singles
- Highest ranking: No. 87 (April 2018)
- Current ranking: No. 178 (February 2025)

Ahsan Ayaz (born 5 October 1998) is a Pakistani professional squash player. He reached a career high ranking of 87 in the world during April 2018.

== Career ==
In September 2024, Ayaz won his 2nd PSA title after securing victory in the Colleyville Open during the 2024–25 PSA Squash Tour.
