= Pakistan women's national squash team =

Pakistan
- Association: Pakistan Squash Federation

Asian Team Championships
- Titles: 0
- Runners-up: 0
- Best finish: 6th

The Pakistan women's national squash team represents Pakistan in international squash competitions, and is administered by the Pakistan Squash Federation. Members of the team compete in singles, doubles, and team events at competitions including continental and regional games (Asian and South Asian Games) and continental championships.

It has participated in the Asian Team Squash Championships (2004, 2014, 2018); Asian Games (2018); Commonwealth Games (2018) and South Asian Games (2004, 2006, 2016, 2019).

== Team members ==
Current Members
Name	Club (domestic)	Competitions	Events
Amna Fayyaz		South Asian Games: 2019	
Faiza Zafar		Asian Games: 2018; Asian Squash Team Championships: 2018; South Asian Games: 2019	
Madina Zafar	SNGPL (2015)	Asian Games: 2018; Asian Squash Team Championships: 2018; Commonwealth Games: 2018; South Asian Games: 2019	
Moqaddas Ashraf		South Asian Games: 2004, 2006, 2019	Singles (2004), team (2004, 2006 and 2019)

Former Members
Name	Club (domestic)	Competitions	Events
Aliya Sarfraz		South Asian Games: 2004	
Carla Khan		South Asian Games: 2006	
Maria Toorpakai Wazir		South Asian Games: 2004, 2006, 2016	
Misbah Rani		South Asian Games: 2004, 2006	
Riffat Khan	Zarai Taraqiati Bank Ltd (2015)	Asian Games: 2018; Asian Squash Team Championships: 2018	
Sadia Gul		South Asian Games: 2016	
Sammer Anjum		South Asian Games: 2016	

== Results ==
=== Asian Team Squash Championships ===
Year	Result	Position
(Malaysia) Kuala Lumpur 2004	Group Stage	7th
(Chinese Taipei) Taiwan 2006	Did Not Participate	
Kuwait City 2008	Did Not Participate	
(India) Chennai 2010	Did Not Participate	
Kuwait City 2012	Did Not Participate	
Hong Kong 2014	Group Stage	6th
(Chinese Taipei) Taiwan 2016	Did Not Participate	
(South Korea) Cheongju 2018	Group Stage	8th
(Malaysia) Kuala Lumpur 2021	Did Not Participate	
(South Korea) Cheongju 2022	Did Not Participate	
(China) Dalian 2024	Did Not Participate	

=== Asian Games ===
Year	Result	Position
(Indonesia) Jakarta 2018	Group Stage	

=== Commonwealth Games ===
Year	Result	Position
(Australia) Gold Coast 2018	Group Stage	

=== South Asian Games ===
Year	Result	Position
(Pakistan) Islamabad 2004	Finalist	2nd
(Sri Lanka) Colombo 2006	Semi-Finalist	3rd
(Bangladesh) Dhaka 2010	Not Held	
(India) Guwahati 2016	Finalist	2nd
(Nepal) Kathmandu 2019	Finalist	2nd

== See also ==
- Pakistan Squash Federation
- Pakistan men's national squash team
