= Toufik Mekhalfi =

French squash player (born 2002)

Personal information
- Born: 30 January 2002 (age 24) Toulouse, France

Sport
- Country: French
- Turned pro: 2018
- Retired: Active
- Racquet used: Tecnifibre

Men's singles
- Highest ranking: No. 55 (April 2026)
- Current ranking: No. 55 (April 2026)
- Title: 5

Toufik Mekhalfi (born 30 January 2002) is a French professional squash player. He reached a career high ranking of 55 in the world during April 2026.

== Career ==
Mekhalfi won the 2021 Annecy Open. In 2024, he won his 2nd PSA title after securing victory in the Gradignan Open during the 2024–25 PSA Squash Tour and followed this up in March 2025, by winning the Odense Open.

In October 2025, he won his 4th PSA title after securing victory in the Brest Open during the 2025–26 PSA Squash Tour. and soon followed this up with a 5th win in the Manitoba Open, which propelled him to his best world ranking of 55.
