= Kyle Finch =

English squash player (born 1998)

Personal information
- Born: 6 December 1998 (age 27) Southampton, England

Sport
- Country: England
- Handedness: Right Handed
- Retired: Active
- Racquet used: Tecnifibre
- Highest ranking: No. 129 (October 2017)
- Current ranking: No. 149 (February 2018)
- Updated on February, 2018

Kyle Finch (born 6 December 1998 in Southampton) is an English professional squash player. As of February 2018, he was ranked number 149 in the world.
