= Viktor Byrtus =

Czech squash player (born 2001)

Personal information
- Born: 17 February 2001 (age 25) Třinec, Czech Republic

Sport
- Country: Czech Republic
- Handedness: Right handed
- Turned pro: 2017
- Retired: Active
- Racquet used: Tecnifibre

Men's singles
- Highest ranking: No. 78 (April 2024)
- Current ranking: No. 78 (April 2024)
- Updated on April 2024

Viktor Byrtus (born 17 February 2001) is a Czech professional squash player. As of April 2024, he was ranked number 78 in the world. He won the 2023 Edmonton Open.
