= Andrew Douglas (squash player) =

American professional squash player

Personal information
- Born: August 12, 1998 (age 27) New York, USA
- Education: University of Pennsylvania
- Height: 176 cm (5 ft 9 in)
- Weight: 68 kg (150 lb)

Sport
- Country: United States
- Handedness: Right Handed
- Retired: 2024
- Racquet used: Tecnifibre

Men's singles
- Highest ranking: No. 48 (January 2024)
Medal record
Men's squash
Representing United States
Pan American Games
Gold medal – first place	2019 Lima	Team
Bronze medal – third place	2019 Lima	Mixed doubles
- Updated on August 2024

Andrew Douglas (born 12 August 1998 in New York) is a retired American professional squash player. He reached a career-high PSA ranking of number 48 in the world. He won the 2018 Barbados Open professional tournament Douglas won a gold medal in the team event and a bronze in the mixed doubles for the United States at the 2019 Pan American Games in Lima Peru. In April 2023 he won the US Squash National Championships for the first time in his career. He retired in August 2024.

Douglas graduated from the University of Pennsylvania in 2021. He played number 1 on the men's varsity squash team for Penn. He was a four-time All-American and four-time All-Ivy player. Douglas won the Men's National Champions (Squash) in 2023.
