= Men's Open International de Squash de Nantes 2018 =

Open International de Nantes 2018
- 4th Men's Open International de Nantes

Details
- Event name: Open International de Squash de Nantes 2018
- Location: Nantes France
- Venue: Théâtre Graslin
- Website www.opensquashnantes.fr

Men's Winner
- Category: Men's PSA Challenger Tour 30
- Prize money: $28,000
- Year: World Tour 2018

The Men's Open International de Squash de Nantes 2018 is the men's edition of the 2018 Open International de Squash de Nantes, which is a tournament of the PSA World Tour event Challenger Tour 30 (Prize money: $28,000).

The event took place at the Théâtre Graslin in Nantes in France from 4 to 9 of September.

Declan James won his first Open International de Nantes trophy, beating James Willstrop in the final.

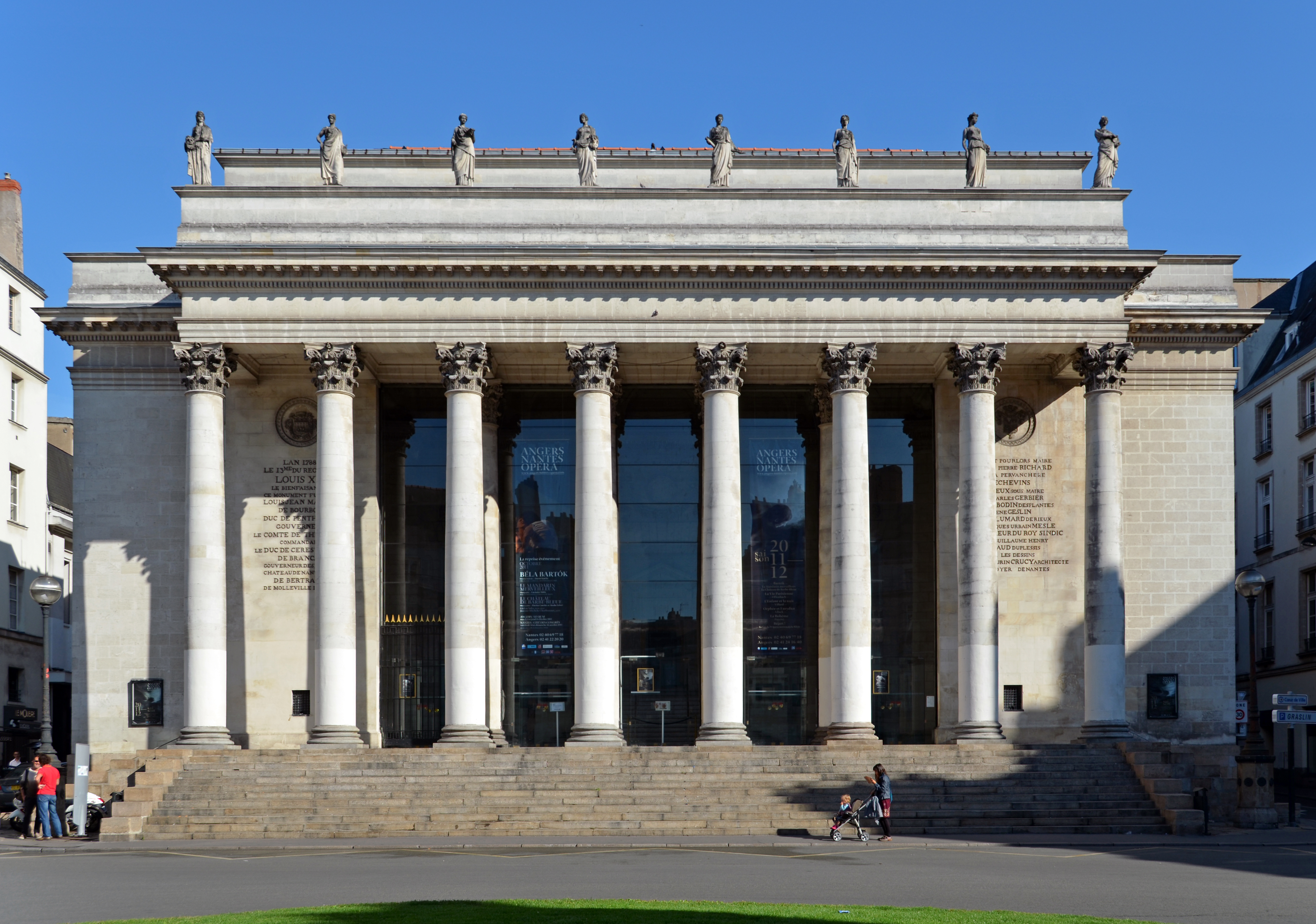
The Théâtre Graslin, venue of the 4th edition

== Prize money and ranking points ==
For 2018, the prize purse was $28,000. The prize money and points breakdown is as follows:

Prize Money Open International de Nantes (2018)
Event	W	F	SF	QF	R16	1R
Points (PSA)	525	354	210	130	78	47.5
Prize money	$4,085	$2,580	$1,610	$970	$590	$375

== Seeds ==
1. (England) James Willstrop (final)
2. (England) Declan James (champion)
3. (Egypt) Zahed Salem (semifinals)
4. (France) Grégoire Marche (quarterfinals)
5. (France) Lucas Serme (quarterfinals)
6. (New Zealand) Campbell Grayson (round of 16)
7. (England) George Parker (quarterfinals)
8. (Finland) Olli Tuominen (quarterfinals)

== Draw and results ==
First round 4 September 2018
(France) Rohan Mandil	1	1	2
9/16	(England) Patrick Rooney	11	11	11
9/16	(England) Charlie Lee	4	11	11	7	11
WC	(France) Benjamin Aubert	11	7	1	11	2
(Spain) Carlos Cornes Ribadas	8	12	8	8
9/16	(Egypt) Shehab Essam	11	10	11	11
9/16	(Spain) Bernat Jaume	11	8	10	11	11
(England) Jaymie Haycocks	8	11	12	7	6
WC	(France) Christophe André	11	12	11
(Belgium) Joeri Hapers	4	10	7
9/16	(France) Baptiste Masotti	11	11	11
(Finland) Matias Tuomi	9	9	5
(Canada) David Baillargeon	11	5	9	6
9/16	(France) Auguste Dussourd	3	11	11	11
9/16	(France) Sébastien Bonmalais	11	11	11
(Czech Republic) Ondřej Uherka	9	8	3

Round of 16; 5 September 2018
1	(England) James Willstrop	11	12	6	11
9/16	(England) Patrick Rooney	6	10	11	9
9/16	(England) Charlie Lee	7	13	5
5	(France) Lucas Serme	11	15	11
7	(England) George Parker	11	11	11
9/16	(Egypt) Shehab Essam	9	9	7
9/16	(Spain) Bernat Jaume	13	9	8	6
3	(Egypt) Zahed Salem	11	11	11	11
8	(Finland) Olli Tuominen	11	4	11	11
WC	(France) Christophe André	6	11	8	4
9/16	(France) Baptiste Masotti	11	11	11
6	(New Zealand) Campbell Grayson	9	9	7
4	(France) Grégoire Marche	11	11	11
9/16	(France) Auguste Dussourd	6	7	9
9/16	(France) Sébastien Bonmalais	6	7	4
2	(England) Declan James	11	11	11

Quarter finals 6 & 7 September 2018
1	(England) James Willstrop	11	11	11
5	(France) Lucas Serme	6	7	5
7	(England) George Parker	15	11	4	6	8
3	(Egypt) Zahed Salem	13	8	11	11	11
8	(Finland) Olli Tuominen	9	11	11	2	10
9/16	(France) Baptiste Masotti	11	7	7	11	12
4	(France) Grégoire Marche	8	7	6
2	(England) Declan James	11	11	11

Semi finals 8 September 2018
1	(England) James Willstrop	11	11	9	12	11
3	(Egypt) Zahed Salem	6	13	11	10	5
9/16	(France) Baptiste Masotti	5	4	7
2	(England) Declan James	11	11	11

Final; 9 September 2018
1	(England) James Willstrop	11	9	11	9	9
2	(England) Declan James	2	11	5	11	11

== See also ==
- Women's Open International de Squash de Nantes 2018
- Open International de Squash de Nantes
- 2018 PSA World Tour
