= Men's Open de France - Nantes 2019 =

Open de France - Nantes 2019
- 5th Men's Open International de Nantes

Details
- Event name: Open International de Squash de Nantes 2018
- Location: Nantes France
- Venue: Château des ducs de Bretagne
- Website www.opensquashnantes.fr

Men's Winner
- Category: Men's PSA World Tour Silver
- Prize money: $73,500
- Year: World Tour 2019

The Men's Open de France - Nantes 2019 is the men's edition of the 2019 Open International de Squash de Nantes, which is a tournament of the PSA World Tour event World Tour Silver (Prize money: $73,500).

The event took place at the Château des ducs de Bretagne in Nantes in France from 9 to 14 September.

Paul Coll won his first Open International de Nantes trophy, beating Joel Makin in the final.

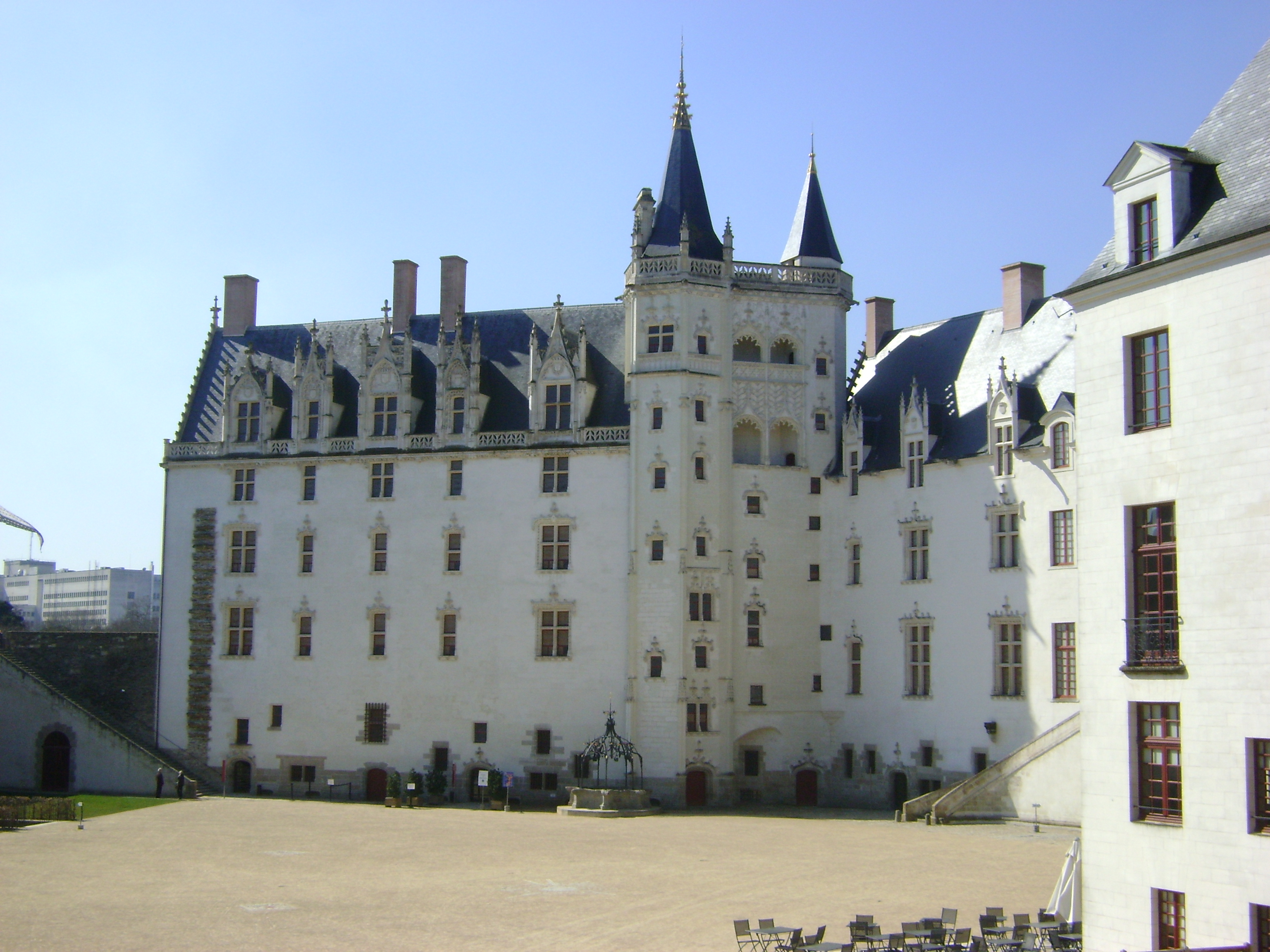
The Château des ducs de Bretagne, venue of the 5th edition

== Prize money and ranking points ==
For 2019, the prize purse was $73,500. The prize money and points breakdown is as follows:

Prize Money Open de France - Nantes (2019)
Event	W	F	SF	QF	R16	1R
Points (PSA)	1225	805	490	300	182.5	112.5
Prize money	$12,825	$8,100	$5,065	$3,035	$1,855	$1,180

== Seeds ==
1. (Germany) Simon Rösner (quarterfinals)
2. (New Zealand) Paul Coll (champion)
3. (Wales) Joel Makin (final)
4. (Egypt) Zahed Salem (semifinals)
5. (Egypt) Fares Dessouky (quarterfinals)
6. (France) Grégoire Marche (semifinals)
7. (England) Declan James (round of 16)
8. (England) James Willstrop (quarterfinals)

== Draw and results ==
1* 2* First round 3* 4*; 9 September 2019
(England) Richie Fallows	13	9	4
9/16	(Spain) Borja Golán	11	11	11
9/16	(England) Daryl Selby	2	6
(England) Nathan Lake	11	11
WC	(France) Benjamin Aubert	12	11	12
9/16	(Germany) Raphael Kandra	10	13	10
9/16	(Scotland) Alan Clyne	11	11
(France) Baptiste Masotti	8	9
(Egypt) Youssef Ibrahim	12	11
9/16	(Spain) Iker Pajares Bernabeu	10	9
9/16	(England) Chris Simpson	11	11
(England) Ben Coleman	8	5
(India) Ramit Tandon	12	4	10
9/16	(France) Mathieu Castagnet	10	11	12
9/16	(England) George Parker	11	11
(Egypt) Mazen Gamal	9	8

1* 2* Round of 16 3*; 10 September 2019
1	(Germany) Simon Rösner	11	16	13
9/16	(Spain) Borja Golán	2	18	11
(England) Nathan Lake	4	4
6	(France) Grégoire Marche	11	11
5	(Egypt) Fares Dessouky	11	11
WC	(France) Benjamin Aubert	2	8
9/16	(Scotland) Alan Clyne	8	9
3	(Wales) Joel Makin	11	11
4	(Egypt) Zahed Salem	11	9	11
(Egypt) Youssef Ibrahim	9	11	5
9/16	(England) Chris Simpson	8	5
8	(England) James Willstrop	11	11
7	(England) Declan James	7	11	3
9/16	(France) Mathieu Castagnet	11	9	11
9/16	(England) George Parker	6	6
2	(New Zealand) Paul Coll	11	11

1* Quarter finals 2*; 11 & 12 September 2019
1	(Germany) Simon Rösner	5	11	3
6	(France) Grégoire Marche	11	9	11
5	(Egypt) Fares Dessouky	12	5	8
3	(Wales) Joel Makin	10	11	11
4	(Egypt) Zahed Salem	11	11
8	(England) James Willstrop	8	7
9/16	(France) Mathieu Castagnet	15	3	9
2	(New Zealand) Paul Coll	13	11	11

Semi finals * 13 September 2019
6	(France) Grégoire Marche	11	11	6	7	7
3	(Wales) Joel Makin	8	6	11	11	11
4	(Egypt) Zahed Salem	9	5	8
2	(New Zealand) Paul Coll	11	11	11

Final * 14 September 2019
3	(Wales) Joel Makin	10	3	9
2	(New Zealand) Paul Coll	12	11	11

== See also ==
- Women's Open de France - Nantes 2019
- Open International de Squash de Nantes
- 2019–20 PSA World Tour
