= Women's Open de France - Nantes 2019 =

Open de France - Nantes 2019
- 5th Women's Open International de Nantes

Details
- Event name: Open International de Squash de Nantes 2018
- Location: Nantes France
- Venue: Château des ducs de Bretagne
- Website www.opensquashnantes.fr

Men's Winner
- Category: Women's PSA World Tour Silver
- Prize money: $73,500
- Year: World Tour 2019

The Women's Open de France - Nantes 2019 is the women's edition of the 2019 Open International de Squash de Nantes, which is a tournament of the PSA World Tour event World Tour Silver (Prize money: $73,500).

The event took place at the Château des ducs de Bretagne in Nantes in France from 9 to 14 of September.

Camille Serme won his first Open International de Nantes trophy, beating Amanda Sobhy in the final.

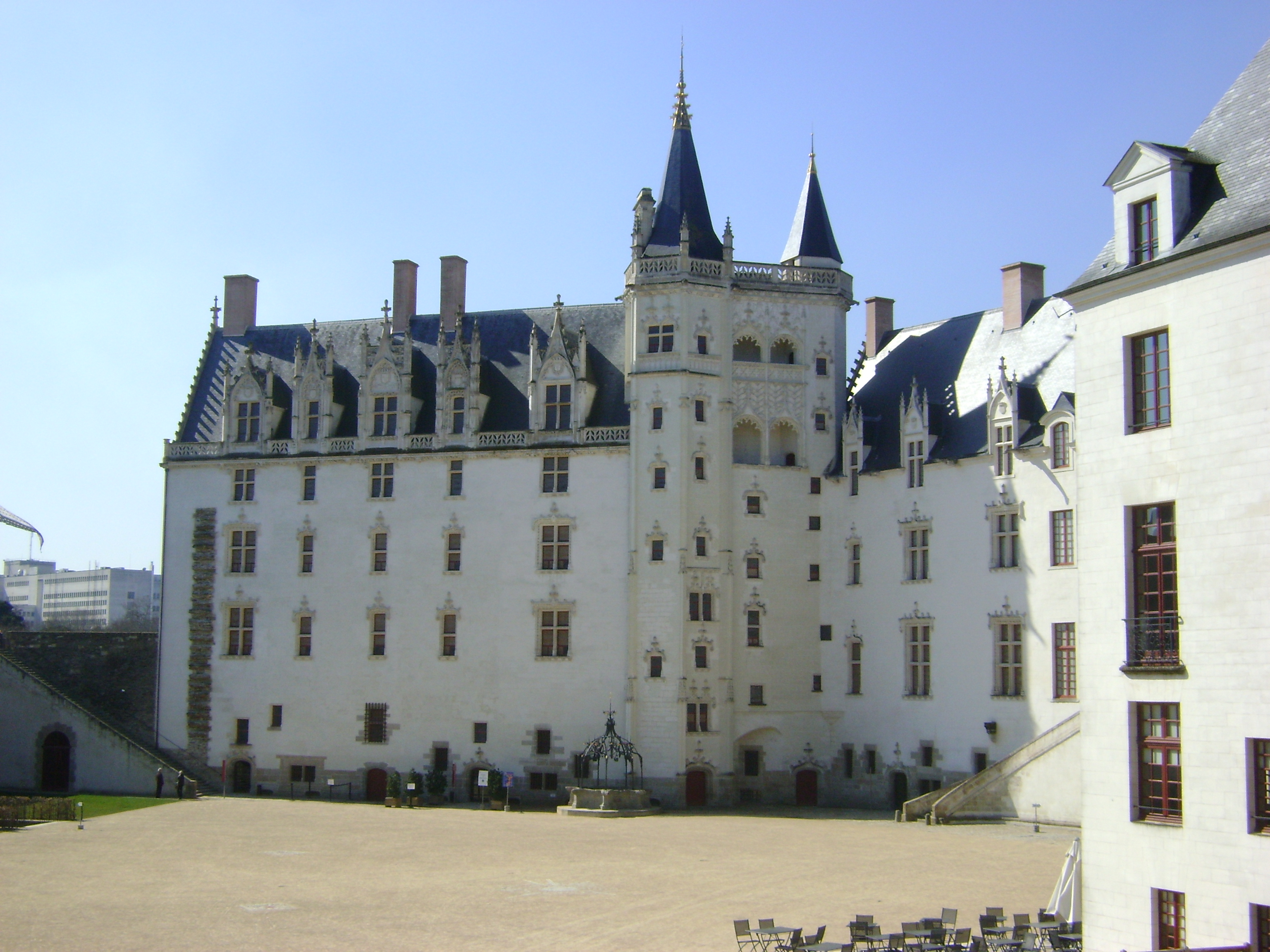
The Château des ducs de Bretagne, venue of the 5th edition

== Prize money and ranking points ==
For 2019, the prize purse was $73,500. The prize money and points breakdown is as follows:

Prize Money Open de France - Nantes (2019)
Event	W	F	SF	QF	R16	1R
Points (PSA)	1225	805	490	300	182.5	112.5
Prize money	$12,825	$8,100	$5,065	$3,035	$1,855	$1,180

== Seeds ==
1. (France) Camille Serme (champion)
2. (England) Sarah-Jane Perry (semifinals)
3. (United States) Amanda Sobhy (final)
4. (England) Alison Waters (quarterfinals)
5. (Egypt) Hania El Hammamy (semifinals)
6. (Belgium) Nele Gilis (round of 16)
7. (United States) Olivia Blatchford Clyne (quarterfinals)
8. (England) Millie Tomlinson (quarterfinals)

== Draw and results ==
1* 2* First round 3* 4*; 9 September 2019
(France) Mélissa Alves	7	11	8
9/16	(France) Coline Aumard	11	9	11
9/16	(Netherlands) Milou van der Heijden	9	11	11
(United States) Olivia Fiechter	11	7	9
(Egypt) Farida Mohamed	5	8
9/16	(Scotland) Lisa Aitken	11	11
9/16	(Belgium) Tinne Gilis	9	7
WC	(France) Énora Villard	11	11
(United States) Haley Mendez	11	5	11
9/16	(Egypt) Mayar Hany	7	11	7
9/16	(Egypt) Nadine Shahin	11	7	11
(England) Lucy Turmel	4	11	7
(Egypt) Menna Nasser	9	7
9/16	(England) Emily Whitlock	11	11
9/16	(England) Julianne Courtice	7	5
(South Africa) Alexandra Fuller	11	11

1* 2* Round of 16 3*; 10 September 2019
1	(France) Camille Serme	11	11
9/16	(France) Coline Aumard	6	4
9/16	(Netherlands) Milou van der Heijden	8	7
8	(England) Millie Tomlinson	11	11
5	(Egypt) Hania El Hammamy	11	11
9/16	(Scotland) Lisa Aitken	4	4
WC	(France) Énora Villard	2	6
4	(England) Alison Waters	11	11
3	(United States) Amanda Sobhy	11	6	11
(United States) Haley Mendez	1	11	1
9/16	(Egypt) Nadine Shahin	6	7
7	(United States) Olivia Blatchford Clyne	11	11
6	(Belgium) Nele Gilis	3	11	8
9/16	(England) Emily Whitlock	11	5	11
(South Africa) Alexandra Fuller	7	11	7
2	(England) Sarah-Jane Perry	11	6	11

1* Quarter finals 2*; 11 & 12 September 2019
1	(France) Camille Serme	11	11
8	(England) Millie Tomlinson	3	6
5	(Egypt) Hania El Hammamy	11	11
4	(England) Alison Waters	3	6
3	(United States) Amanda Sobhy	11	6	11
7	(United States) Olivia Blatchford Clyne	1	11	1
9/16	(England) Emily Whitlock	11	8	8
2	(England) Sarah-Jane Perry	7	11	11

Semi finals * 13 September 2019
1	(France) Camille Serme	11	11	11
5	(Egypt) Hania El Hammamy	4	7	8
3	(United States) Amanda Sobhy	15	11	5	11
2	(England) Sarah-Jane Perry	13	5	11	6

Final * 14 September 2019
1	(France) Camille Serme	9	11	11	11
3	(United States) Amanda Sobhy	11	6	8	9

== See also ==
- Men's Open de France - Nantes 2019
- Open International de Squash de Nantes
- 2019–20 PSA World Tour
