= 2022–23 PSA World Tour Finals =

2022–23 PSA World Tour

Details
- Event name: 2022–23 PSA World Tour Finals
- Website; PSA World Tour standings
- Year: 2022–23 PSA World Tour

The 2022–23 PSA World Tour is a series of men's and women's squash tournaments which are part of the Professional Squash Association (PSA) PSA World Tour from August 2022 until July 2023. The PSA World Tour tournaments are some of the most prestigious events on the men's and women's tour. The best-performing players in the World Tour events qualify for the annual Men's and Women's Finals.

Starting in August 2018, PSA replaced World Series tournaments with new PSA World Tour, comprising four new tournament-tiers: Platinum ($164,500–$180,500), Gold ($100,000–$120,500), Silver ($70,000–$88,000) and Bronze ($51,000–$53,000) each one awarding different points.

== PSA World Tour Ranking Points ==
PSA World Tour events also have a separate World Tour ranking. Points for this are calculated on a cumulative basis after each World Tour event. The top eight players at the end of the calendar year are then eligible to play in the PSA World Tour Finals.

Ranking points vary according to tournament tier being awarded as follows:

Tournament			Ranking Points
Rank	Prize Money US$	Ranking Points	Winner	Runner up	3/4	5/8	9/16	17/32	33/48
World Championship	$500,000	25045 points	3175	2090	1270	780	475	290	177.5
Platinum	$164,500–$180,500	19188 points	2750	1810	1100	675	410	250	152.5
Gold	$100,000–$120,500	10660 points	1750	1150	700	430	260	160
Silver	$75,000–$88,000	7470 points	1225	805	490	300	182.5	112.5
Bronze	$47,500–$55,000	5330 points	875	575	350	215	130	80

== Men's ==
=== Tournaments ===
Tournament	Country	Location	Rank	Prize money	Date	Winner
CIB ZED Squash Open	Egypt	Sheikh Zayed City	Bronze	$55,000	24–28 August 2022	(Egypt) Youssef Soliman
QTerminals Qatar Classic	Qatar	Doha	Platinum	$187,500	4–10 September 2022	(England) Mohamed El Shorbagy
Open de France	France	Nantes	Bronze	$55,000	12–17 September 2022	(France) Victor Crouin
CIB Egyptian Open	Egypt	Cairo	Platinum	$300,000	19–25 September 2022	(Egypt) Ali Farag
Oracle Netsuite Open	United States	San Francisco	Silver	$80,000	30 September–4 October 2022	(England) Mohamed El Shorbagy
U.S. Open	United States	Philadelphia	Platinum	$181,377	8–15 October 2022	(Peru) Diego Elías
Grasshopper Cup	Switzerland	Zürich	Gold	$107,500	18–23 October 2022	(Egypt) Mostafa Asal
Robertson Lodges New Zealand Open	New Zealand	Mount Maunganui	Silver	$77,500	8–13 November 2022	(England) Mohamed El Shorbagy
MARIGOLD Singapore Open	Singapore	Kallang	Gold	$110,000	15–20 November 2022	(England) Mohamed El Shorbagy
Malaysian Open	Malaysia	Kuala Lumpur	Bronze	$52,500	22–26 November 2022	(Egypt) Mazen Hesham
Everbright Securities International HK Open	Hong Kong	Hong Kong	Platinum	$170,000	28 November–4 December 2022	(Egypt) Mostafa Asal
Hong Kong Football Club Open	Hong Kong	Hong Kong	Bronze	$55,000	6–10 December 2022	(Egypt) Marwan El Shorbagy
Houston Open	United States	Houston	Gold	$110,000	11–15 January 2023	(Egypt) Mostafa Asal
J.P. Morgan Tournament of Champions	United States	New York City	Platinum	$180,000	18–26 January 2023	(Peru) Diego Elías
Sturbridge Capital Motor City Open	United States	Bloomfield Hills	Silver	$80,000	1–5 February 2023	(Peru) Diego Elías
Pittsburgh Open	United States	Pittsburgh	Silver	$80,000	8–12 February 2023	(Peru) Diego Elías
Oxford Properties Canadian Open	Canada	Calgary	Bronze	$55,000	13–17 February 2023	(Wales) Joel Makin
Squash on Fire Open	United States	Washington, D.C.	Bronze	$50,000	22–26 February 2023	(France) Victor Crouin
Black Ball Squash Open	Egypt	New Cairo	Gold	$110,000	2–7 March 2023	(England) Mohamed El Shorbagy
GillenMarkets Canary Wharf Classic	England	London	Gold	$110,000	12–17 March 2023	(New Zealand) Paul Coll
OptAsia Championships	England	London	Gold	$108,500	21–26 March 2023	(Egypt) Karim Abdel Gawad
British Open	England	Birmingham	Platinum	$179,000	9–16 April 2023	(Egypt) Ali Farag
PSA World Championships	United States	Chicago	W.C.	$500,000	3–11 May 2023	(Egypt) Ali Farag
Manchester Open	England	Manchester	Silver	$76,000	17–21 May 2023	(Egypt) Ali Farag
El Gouna International	Egypt	El Gouna	Platinum	$180,000	26 May–2 June 2023	(Egypt) Ali Farag

=== Standings ===
World Championship
177.5	1st Round	290	2nd Round
475	3rd Round	780	Quarterfinalist
1270	Semifinalist	2090	Runner-up
**3175**	Winner		

Platinum
152.5	1st Round	250	2nd Round
410	3rd Round	675	Quarterfinalist
1100	Semifinalist	1810	Runner-up
**2750**	Winner		

Gold
160	1st Round	260	2nd Round
430	Quarterfinalist	700	Semifinalist
1150	Runner-up	**1750**	Winner

Silver
112.5	1st Round	182.5	2nd Round
300	Quarterfinalist	490	Semifinalist
805	Runner-up	**1225**	Winner

Bronze
80	1st Round	130	2nd Round
215	Quarterfinalist	350	Semifinalist
575	Runner-up	**875**	Winner

Top 16 Men's PSA World Tour Standings 2022–23
Rank	Player	Tournaments Played	EGY (Egypt)	QAT (Qatar)	FRA (France)	EGY (Egypt)	USA (United States)	USA (United States)	SUI (Switzerland)	NZL (New Zealand)	SGP (Singapore)	MYS (Malaysia)	HKG (Hong Kong)	HKG (Hong Kong)	USA (United States)	USA (United States)	USA (United States)	USA (United States)	CAN (Canada)	USA (United States)	EGY (Egypt)	ENG (England)	ENG (England)	GBR (United Kingdom)	USA (United States)	ENG (England)	EGY (Egypt)	Total Points
1	(Peru) **Diego Elías**	16	DNP	675	DNP	1100	490	**2750**	700	DNP	1150	DNP	1810	DNP	DNP	**2750**	**1225**	**1225**	DNP	DNP	700	260	260	1810	780	DNP	1100	18785
2	(Egypt) **Ali Farag**	12	DNP	410	DNP	**2750**	DNP	1810	260	DNP	DNP	DNP	DNP	DNP	DNP	DNP	DNP	300	DNP	DNP	430	700	430	**2750**	**3175**	**1225**	**2750**	16990
3	(England) **Mohd. El Shorbagy**	15	DNP	**2750**	DNP	410	**1225**	1100	DNP	**1225**	**1750**	DNP	1100	DNP	1150	250	DNP	DNP	DNP	DNP	**1750**	430	260	410	1270	DNP	1100	16180
4	(Egypt) **Mostafa Asal**	12	DNP	1100	DNP	1100	DNP	250	**1750**	DNP	700	DNP	**2750**	DNP	**1750**	410	DNP	DNP	DNP	DNP	260	700	DNP	DNP	1270	DNP	1810	13850
5	(Egypt) Marw. El Shorbagy‡	18	DNP	675	575	675	805	1100	1150	DNP	DNP	215	675	**875**	700	1810	DNP	805	DNP	DNP	430	260	260	675	475	DNP	410	12570
6	(New Zealand) **Paul Coll**	14	DNP	250	DNP	1810	DNP	675	430	805	260	DNP	1100	DNP	DNP	1100	300	DNP	DNP	DNP	260	**1750**	DNP	1100	780	DNP	675	11295
7	(Egypt) **Mazen Hesham**	17	DNP	DNP	DNP	675	490	410	DNP	DNP	430	**875**	675	575	700	675	805	300	DNP	DNP	430	430	700	1100	780	DNP	675	10725
8	(France) **Victor Crouin**	18	575	1810	**875**	410	DNP	250	DNP	490	430	DNP	675	DNP	430	675	DNP	DNP	575	**875**	DNP	260	260	675	290	300	675	10530
9	(Egypt) **Tarek Momen**	15	DNP	1100	DNP	675	DNP	675	430	DNP	430	575	DNP	DNP	DNP	675	490	182.5	DNP	DNP	1150	430	DNP	675	780	490	410	9167.5
10	(Egypt) Youssef Soliman	19	**875**	410	DNP	250	182.5	675	260	DNP	DNP	DNP	675	350	430	410	300	490	DNP	DNP	260	160	1150	410	177.5	182.5	410	8057.5
11	(Wales) Joel Makin	15	DNP	250	DNP	DNP	DNP	675	430	DNP	700	350	DNP	DNP	DNP	250	DNP	300	**875**	DNP	700	1150	430	250	475	490	410	7735
12	(Egypt) Karim Abdel Gawad	7	DNP	DNP	DNP	DNP	DNP	DNP	DNP	DNP	DNP	DNP	DNP	DNP	DNP	DNP	DNP	DNP	DNP	DNP	260	260	**1750**	675	2090	805	250	6090
13	(Colombia) Miguel Á Rodríguez	15	DNP	675	DNP	DNP	300	410	160	182.5	260	215	250	DNP	DNP	1100	300	300	350	DNP	DNP	DNP	DNP	250	475	DNP	250	5477.5
14	(Egypt) Fares Dessouky	11	DNP	410	DNP	675	DNP	410	700	DNP	160	DNP	DNP	DNP	DNP	675	490	DNP	DNP	DNP	430	DNP	DNP	DNP	290	300	410	4950
15	(Switzerland) Nicolas Müller	17	DNP	250	DNP	250	DNP	DNP	430	DNP	260	350	250	130	260	410	DNP	DNP	215	DNP	160	260	260	410	177.5	300	250	4622.5
16	(France) Grégoire Marche	17	DNP	250	130	410	DNP	250	260	DNP	260	DNP	DNP	DNP	430	250	300	182.5	DNP	DNP	260	160	260	250	290	112.5	152.5	4207.5

Bold – Players qualified for the final
(*) – Winners of Platinum's tournaments automatically qualifies for Finals.
(‡) – Withdrew one day before PSA World Tour Finals due to an injury.

Final tournament	Country	Location	Prize money	Date	2022–23 World Tour Champion
Men's PSA World Tour Finals	Egypt	EDNC SODIC, New Cairo	$202,500	20–25 June 2023	(Egypt) Mostafa Asal

== Women's ==
=== Tournaments ===
Tournament	Country	Location	Rank	Prize money	Date	Winner
CIB ZED Squash Open	Egypt	Sheikh Zayed City	Bronze	$55,000	24–28 August 2022	(Egypt) Nour El Tayeb
South Western Open	United States	Houston	Gold	$110,000	6–11 September 2022	(Egypt) Nouran Gohar
Open de France	France	Nantes	Bronze	$55,000	12–17 September 2022	(Belgium) Nele Gilis
CIB Egyptian Open	Egypt	Cairo	Platinum	$300,000	19–25 September 2022	(Egypt) Hania El Hammamy
Oracle Netsuite Open	United States	San Francisco	Silver	$80,000	30 September–4 October 2022	(United States) Amanda Sobhy
U.S. Open	United States	Philadelphia	Platinum	$181,377	8–15 October 2022	(Egypt) Nouran Gohar
Grasshopper Cup	Switzerland	Zürich	Gold	$107,500	18–23 October 2022	(Egypt) Nour El Sherbini
Barfoot & Thompson New Zealand Open	New Zealand	Mount Maunganui	Silver	$77,500	8–13 November 2022	(New Zealand) Joelle King
MARIGOLD Singapore Open	Singapore	Kallang	Gold	$110,000	15–20 November 2022	(New Zealand) Joelle King
Malaysian Open	Malaysia	Kuala Lumpur	Bronze	$52,500	22–26 November 2022	(Belgium) Nele Gilis
Everbright Securities International HK Open	Hong Kong	Hong Kong	Platinum	$170,000	28 November–4 December 2022	(Egypt) Hania El Hammamy
Corcoran Carol Weymuller Open	United States	New York City	Bronze	$51,250	11–15 January 2023	(England) Georgina Kennedy
J.P. Morgan Tournament of Champions	United States	New York City	Platinum	$180,000	18–26 January 2023	(Egypt) Nour El Sherbini
Cleveland Classic	United States	Pepper Pike	Silver	$75,000	1–5 February 2023	(England) Georgina Kennedy
DAC Pro Squash Classic	United States	Detroit	Silver	$82,500	7–11 February 2023	(United States) Olivia Fiechter
Cincinnati Gaynor Cup	United States	Cincinnati	Silver	$75,000	12–16 February 2023	(Egypt) Nouran Gohar
Squash on Fire Open	United States	Washington, D.C.	Bronze	$50,000	22–26 February 2023	(Belgium) Tinne Gilis
Chestnut Hill Classic	United States	Philadelphia	Bronze	$51,250	2–6 March 2023	(United States) Olivia Fiechter
Black Ball Squash Open	Egypt	New Cairo	Gold	$110,000	2–7 March 2023	(Egypt) Nouran Gohar
Canadian Women's Open	Canada	Toronto	Bronze	$51,250	26–30 March 2023	(United States) Amanda Sobhy
British Open	England	Birmingham	Platinum	$179,000	9–16 April 2023	(Egypt) Nour El Sherbini
PSA World Championships	United States	Chicago	W.C.	$500,000	3–11 May 2023	(Egypt) Nour El Sherbini
Manchester Open	England	Manchester	Silver	$76,000	17–21 May 2023	(Egypt) Nour El Tayeb
El Gouna International	Egypt	El Gouna	Platinum	$180,000	26 May–2 June 2023	(Egypt) Nouran Gohar

=== Standings ===
World Championship
177.5	1st Round	290	2nd Round
475	3rd Round	780	Quarterfinalist
1270	Semifinalist	2090	Runner-up
**3175**	Winner		

Platinum
152.5	1st Round	250	2nd Round
410	3rd Round	675	Quarterfinalist
1100	Semifinalist	1810	Runner-up
**2750**	Winner		

Gold
160	1st Round	260	2nd Round
430	Quarterfinalist	700	Semifinalist
1150	Runner-up	**1750**	Winner

Silver
112.5	1st Round	182.5	2nd Round
300	Quarterfinalist	490	Semifinalist
805	Runner-up	**1225**	Winner

Bronze
80	1st Round	130	2nd Round
215	Quarterfinalist	350	Semifinalist
575	Runner-up	**875**	Winner

Top 16 Women's World Tour Standings 2022–23
Rank	Player	Tournaments Played	EGY (Egypt)	USA (United States)	FRA (France)	EGY (Egypt)	USA (United States)	USA (United States)	SUI (Switzerland)	NZL (New Zealand)	SGP (Singapore)	MYS (Malaysia)	HKG (Hong Kong)	USA (United States)	USA (United States)	USA (United States)	USA (United States)	USA (United States)	USA (United States)	USA (United States)	EGY (Egypt)	CAN (Canada)	GBR (United Kingdom)	USA (United States)	ENG (England)	EGY (Egypt)	Total Points
1	(Egypt) **Nouran Gohar**	10	DNP	**1750**	DNP	1810	DNP	**2750**	DNP	DNP	DNP	DNP	1100	DNP	1810	DNP	DNP	**1225**	DNP	DNP	**1750**	DNP	1810	2090	DNP	**2750**	18845
2	(Egypt) **Nour El Sherbini**	9	DNP	DNP	DNP	1100	DNP	1810	**1750**	DNP	DNP	DNP	1810	DNP	**2750**	DNP	DNP	DNP	DNP	DNP	430	DNP	**2750**	**3175**	DNP	1100	16675
3	(Egypt) **Hania El Hammamy**	9	DNP	DNP	DNP	**2750**	DNP	410	1150	DNP	DNP	DNP	**2750**	DNP	1100	DNP	DNP	DNP	DNP	DNP	1150	DNP	675	1270	DNP	1100	12355
4	(New Zealand) **Joelle King**	14	DNP	DNP	DNP	410	490	1100	DNP	**1225**	**1750**	DNP	1100	DNP	1100	300	300	DNP	DNP	DNP	700	DNP	1100	1270	300	250	11395
5	(Belgium) **Nele Gilis**	16	350	DNP	**875**	410	DNP	410	DNP	490	430	**875**	675	DNP	410	182.5	300	DNP	DNP	350	DNP	DNP	410	780	805	1810	9562.5
6	(Egypt) **Nour El Tayeb**	12	**875**	1150	DNP	410	DNP	1100	430	DNP	1150	DNP	675	DNP	675	300	DNP	DNP	DNP	DNP	DNP	DNP	DNP	780	**1225**	410	9180
7	(United States) Amanda Sobhy‡	12	DNP	700	DNP	1100	**1225**	675	DNP	DNP	700	DNP	DNP	DNP	675	300	DNP	DNP	DNP	DNP	700	**875**	1100	780	182.5	DNP	9012.5
8	(England) **Georgina Kennedy**	14	DNP	430	DNP	250	DNP	DNP	430	DNP	260	DNP	DNP	**875**	675	**1225**	805	490	DNP	DNP	430	DNP	675	780	490	675	8490
9	(United States) **Olivia Fiechter**	14	DNP	430	DNP	675	DNP	250	430	DNP	260	575	DNP	575	250	490	**1225**	182.5	DNP	**875**	DNP	DNP	410	475	DNP	DNP	7102.5
10	(Egypt) Salma Hany	17	575	430	DNP	250	DNP	675	430	182.5	260	DNP	250	215	250	DNP	490	490	DNP	DNP	260	575	410	475	DNP	675	6892.5
11	(Egypt) Rowan Elaraby	14	DNP	700	DNP	250	DNP	675	700	DNP	430	DNP	410	DNP	410	DNP	300	300	DNP	DNP	260	DNP	675	475	182.5	410	6177.5
12	(Wales) Tesni Evans	14	DNP	DNP	350	675	DNP	410	700	805	160	350	DNP	DNP	DNP	300	182.5	DNP	DNP	DNP	260	DNP	250	475	300	675	5892.5
13	(Belgium) Tinne Gilis	13	DNP	DNP	575	410	DNP	410	260	490	430	DNP	DNP	DNP	250	DNP	182.5	DNP	**875**	DNP	430	DNP	410	475	DNP	675	5872.5
14	(United States) Olivia Clyne	15	DNP	260	DNP	410	182.5	410	DNP	182.5	160	DNP	DNP	DNP	410	805	490	805	DNP	575	DNP	350	250	290	DNP	250	5830
15	(England) Sarah-Jane Perry	14	DNP	DNP	DNP	675	DNP	410	260	300	430	DNP	675	DNP	410	182.5	DNP	182.5	DNP	DNP	430	DNP	675	475	182.5	250	5537.5
16	(United States) Sabrina Sobhy	16	DNP	260	DNP	250	300	675	DNP	300	700	DNP	DNP	130	410	182.5	182.5	DNP	350	DNP	260	350	410	475	DNP	250	5485

Bold – Players qualified for the final
(*) – Winners of Platinum's tournaments automatically qualifies for Finals.
(‡) – Withdrew from the PSA World Tour Finals due to an injury.

Final tournament	Country	Location	Prize money	Date	2022–23 World Tour Champion
Women's PSA World Tour Finals	Egypt	EDNC SODIC, New Cairo	$202,500	20–25 June 2023	(Egypt) Nouran Gohar

== See also ==
- 2022–23 PSA World Tour
- Official Men's Squash World Ranking
- Official Women's Squash World Ranking
