= Women's Open International de Squash de Nantes 2018 =

Open International de Nantes 2018
- 3rd Women's Open International de Nantes

Details
- Event name: Open International de Squash de Nantes 2018
- Location: Nantes France
- Venue: Théâtre Graslin
- Website www.opensquashnantes.fr

Men's Winner
- Category: Women's PSA Challenger Tour 20
- Prize money: $18,000
- Year: World Tour 2018

The Women's Open International de Squash de Nantes 2018 is the women's edition of the 2018 Open International de Squash de Nantes, which is a tournament of the PSA World Tour event Challenger Tour 20 (Prize money: $18,000).

The event took place at the Théâtre Graslin in Nantes in France from 4 to 9 of September.

Nele Gilis won her first Open International de Nantes trophy, beating Emily Whitlock in the final.

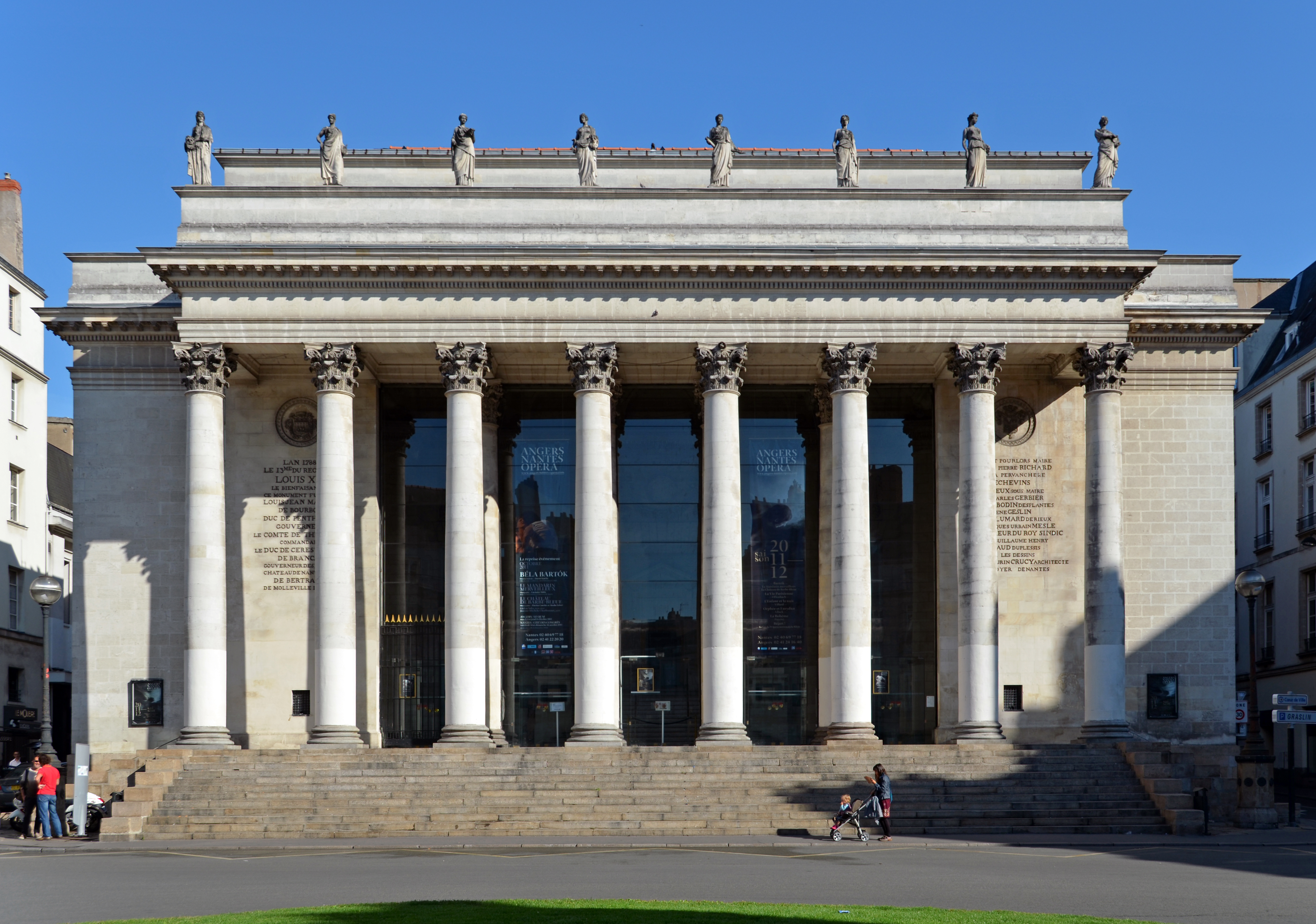
The Théâtre Graslin, venue of the 4th edition

== Prize money and ranking points ==
For 2018, the prize purse was $18,000. The prize money and points breakdown is as follows:

Prize Money Open International de Nantes (2018)
Event	W	F	SF	QF	R16	1R
Points (PSA)	350	230	140	85	51	31.5
Prize money	$2,850	$1,800	$1,125	$675	$415	$260

== Seeds ==
1. (England) Emily Whitlock (final)
2. (England) Fiona Moverley (semifinals)
3. (Egypt) Nadine Shahin (quarterfinals)
4. (Belgium) Nele Gilis (champion)
5. (Netherlands) Milou van der Heijden (round of 16)
6. (England) Julianne Courtice (quarterfinals)
7. (South Africa) Alexandra Fuller (quarterfinals)
8. (Belgium) Tinne Gilis (quarterfinals)

== Draw and results ==
First round 4 September 2018
(Egypt) Hana Ramadan	10	7	11	6
9/16	(Scotland) Lisa Aitken	12	11	9	11
9/16	(England) Kace Bartley	4	11	11	11
WC	(France) Julia Le Coq	11	9	6	9
(Switzerland) Cindy Merlo	7	7	2
9/16	(England) Lucy Turmel	11	11	11
9/16	(Scotland) Alison Thomson	9	11	11	11
(Wales) Ali Hemingway	11	0	6	7
(England) Jasmine Hutton	5	10	11	7
9/16	(England) Rachael Chadwick	11	12	8	11
9/16	(France) Chloé Mesic	11	11	11
(Finland) Riina Koskinen	3	0	6
(Spain) Cristina Gómez	2	5	9
9/16	(Latvia) Ineta Mackevica	11	11	11
9/16	(South Africa) Milnay Louw	11	8	11	6	11
WC	(France) Marie Stephan	6	11	3	11	1

Round of 16; 5 September 2018
1	(England) Emily Whitlock	14	11	11
9/16	(Scotland) Lisa Aitken	12	7	1
9/16	(England) Kace Bartley	6	7	5
6	(England) Julianne Courtice	11	11	11
5	(Netherlands) Milou van der Heijden	9	5	7
9/16	(England) Lucy Turmel	11	11	11
9/16	(Scotland) Alison Thomson	7	10	11
3	(Egypt) Nadine Shahin	11	12	13
4	(Belgium) Nele Gilis	11	11	11
9/16	(England) Rachael Chadwick	8	7	4
9/16	(France) Chloé Mesic	4	3	4
7	(South Africa) Alexandra Fuller	11	11	11
8	(Belgium) Tinne Gilis	11	14	11
9/16	(Latvia) Ineta Mackevica	2	12	6
9/16	(South Africa) Milnay Louw	4	8	5
2	(England) Fiona Moverley	11	11	11

Quarter finals 6 & 7 September 2018
1	(England) Emily Whitlock	11	11	12	11
6	(England) Julianne Courtice	13	8	10	9
9/16	(England) Lucy Turmel	11	11	11	11
3	(Egypt) Nadine Shahin	7	13	6	9
4	(Belgium) Nele Gilis	11	11	11
7	(South Africa) Alexandra Fuller	2	4	5
8	(Belgium) Tinne Gilis	5	4	11	8
2	(England) Fiona Moverley	11	11	7	11

Semi finals 8 September 2018
1	(England) Emily Whitlock	11	11	11
9/16	(England) Lucy Turmel	7	2	5
4	(Belgium) Nele Gilis	11	11	11
2	(England) Fiona Moverley	7	9	3

Final; 9 September 2018
1	(England) Emily Whitlock	11	6	11	10	6
4	(Belgium) Nele Gilis	4	11	6	12	11

== See also ==
- Men's Open International de Squash de Nantes 2018
- Open International de Squash de Nantes
- 2018 PSA World Tour
