= Open International de Squash de Nantes =

Open International de Nantes

Details
- Event name: Open International de Squash de Nantes
- Location: Nantes, France
- Venue: Château des ducs de Bretagne (2019); Théâtre Graslin (2018); Machines of the Isle (2017); Cité International des Congrès (2016); Le Lieu Unique (2015)
- Website www.opensquashnantes.fr

Men's Winner
- Category: PSA World Tour Bronze
- Prize money: $55,500
- Most recent champion(s): (France) Victor Crouin

Women's Winner
- Category: PSA World Tour Bronze
- Prize money: $55,500
- Most recent champion(s): (Belgium) Nele Gilis

The Open International de Squash de Nantes is an annual international squash tournament for professional players, held in Nantes in France in September. It is part of the PSA World Tour. The event was first held in 2015 in Le Lieu Unique.

== History ==
=== Competition ===
The very first edition held at Le Lieu Unique in 2015 was also held in the Badmin'Squash club in Rezé during the qualification phase. Since 2016, the qualification phase and 1st rounds have been held in La Maison du Squash club in Sautron.

The competition has evolved since its beginning. It only hosted a men's competition in the first edition. From 2016, it included, for the first time, a female competition.

In 2019, the name of the competition changed to Open de France to include the most important tournaments of the PSA World Tour.

=== Identity project ===
This event connects culture and sport by featuring squash through a glass court located in an emblematic place of Nantes and by invited artists around Nantes' culture. The competition incorporates various elements, such as the event poster, teaser, match introductions, DJs, musicians, dancers, and the competition trophy, all of which contribute to giving the competition a unique character.

== Venues ==
The competition stands out in particular by the choice of unusual places hosting its events.

=== Season 1 ===
| Year | Location | Venue |
|---|---|---|
| 2015 | Nantes | Le Lieu Unique |
| 2016 | Nantes | Cité International des Congrès |
| 2017 | Nantes | The Naves - Machines of the Isle |
| 2018 | Nantes | Théâtre Graslin |
| 2019 | Nantes | Château des ducs de Bretagne |
| 2020 | No competition | |

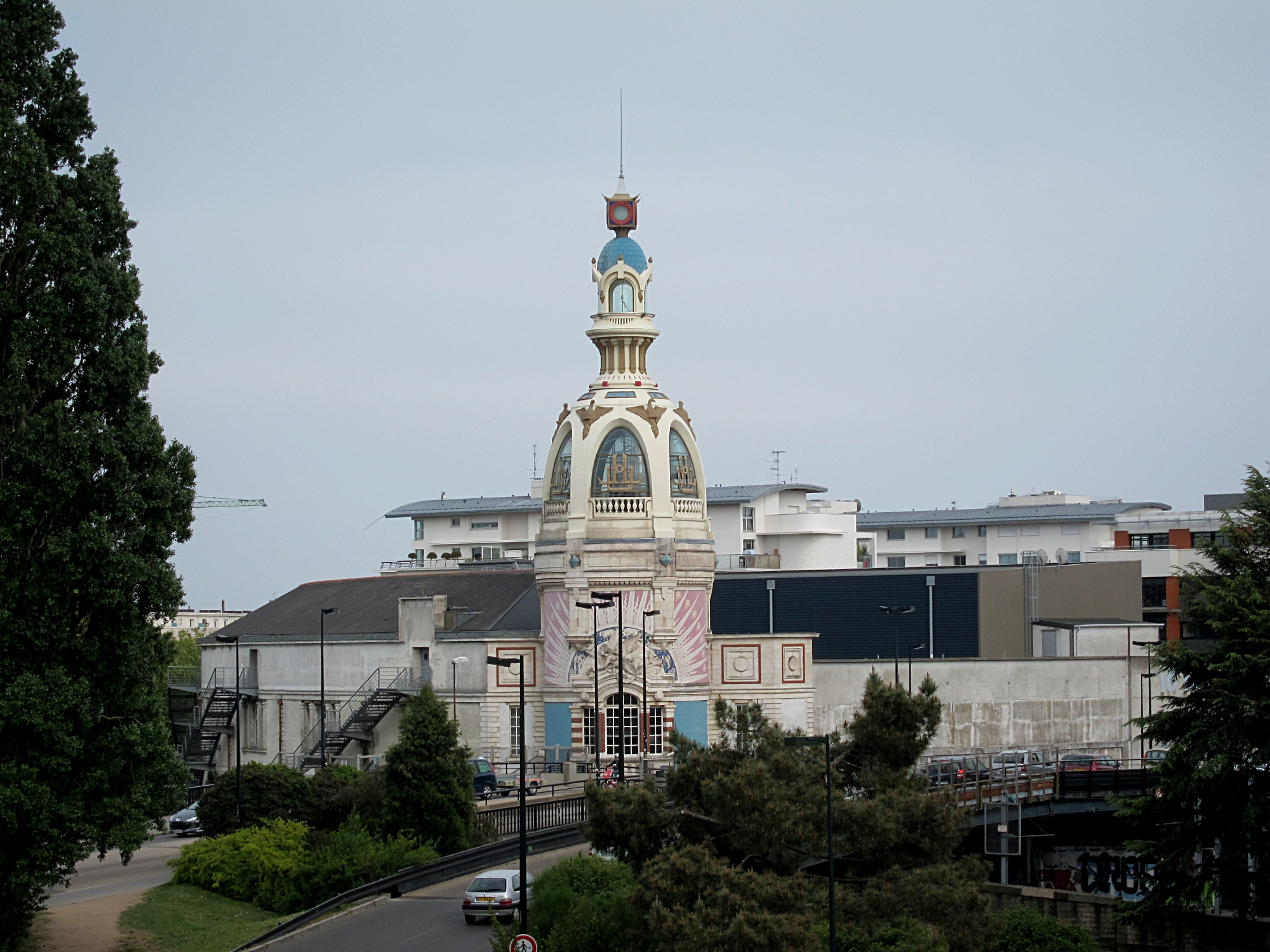
Le Lieu Unique, venue of the 1st edition.

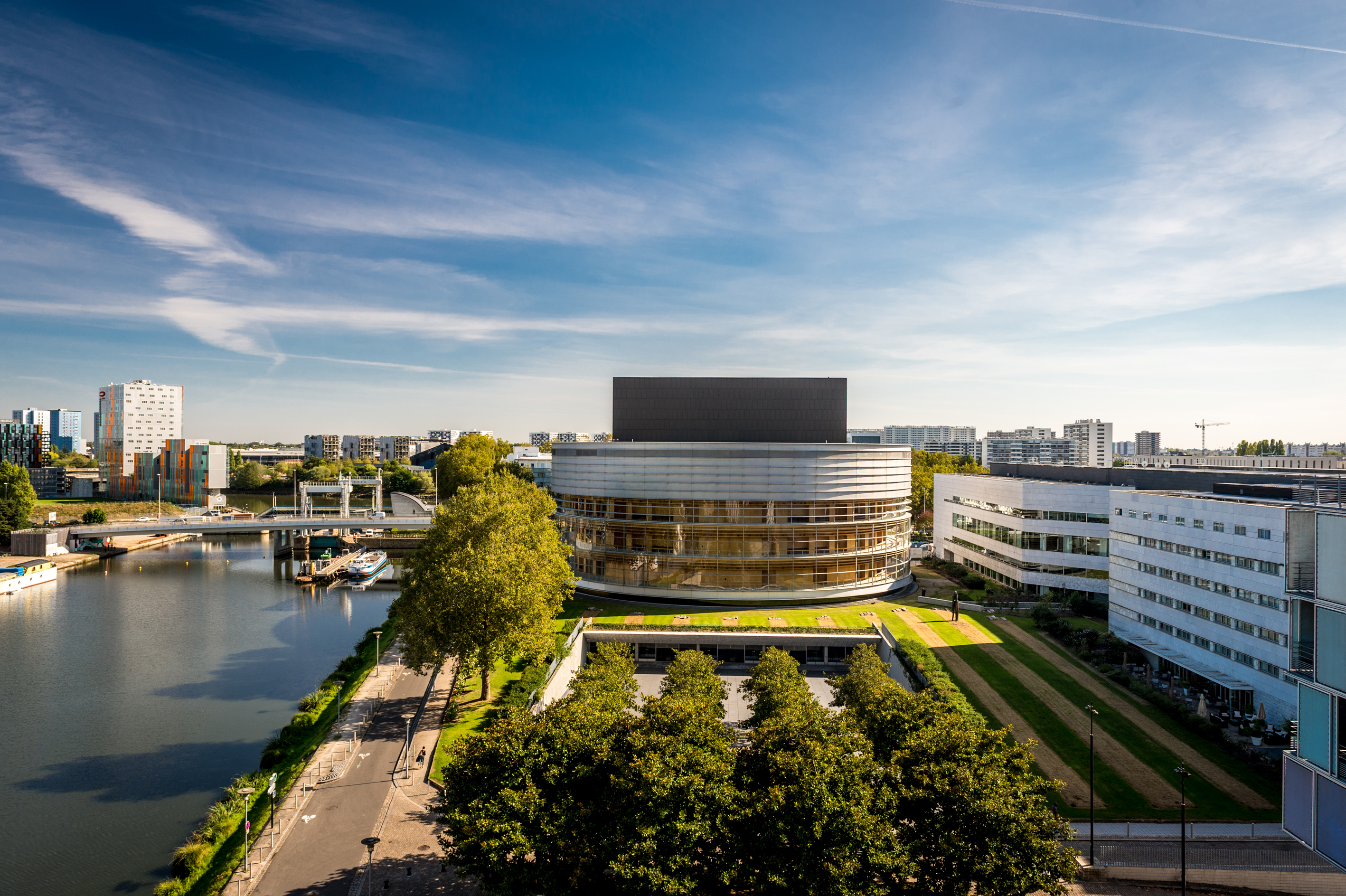
La Cité des Congrès, venue of the 2nd edition.

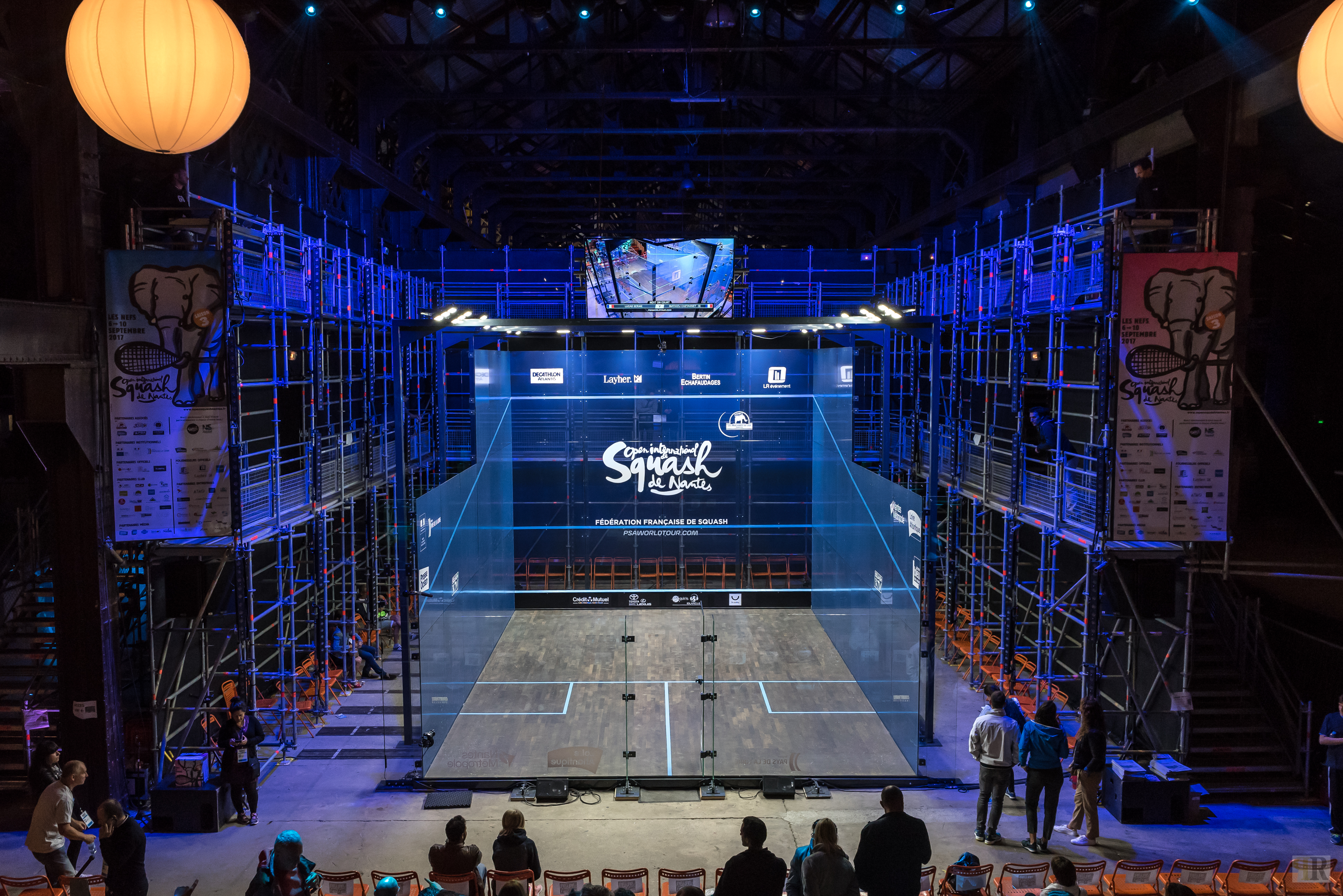
The glass court, under The Naves, venue of the 3rd edition.

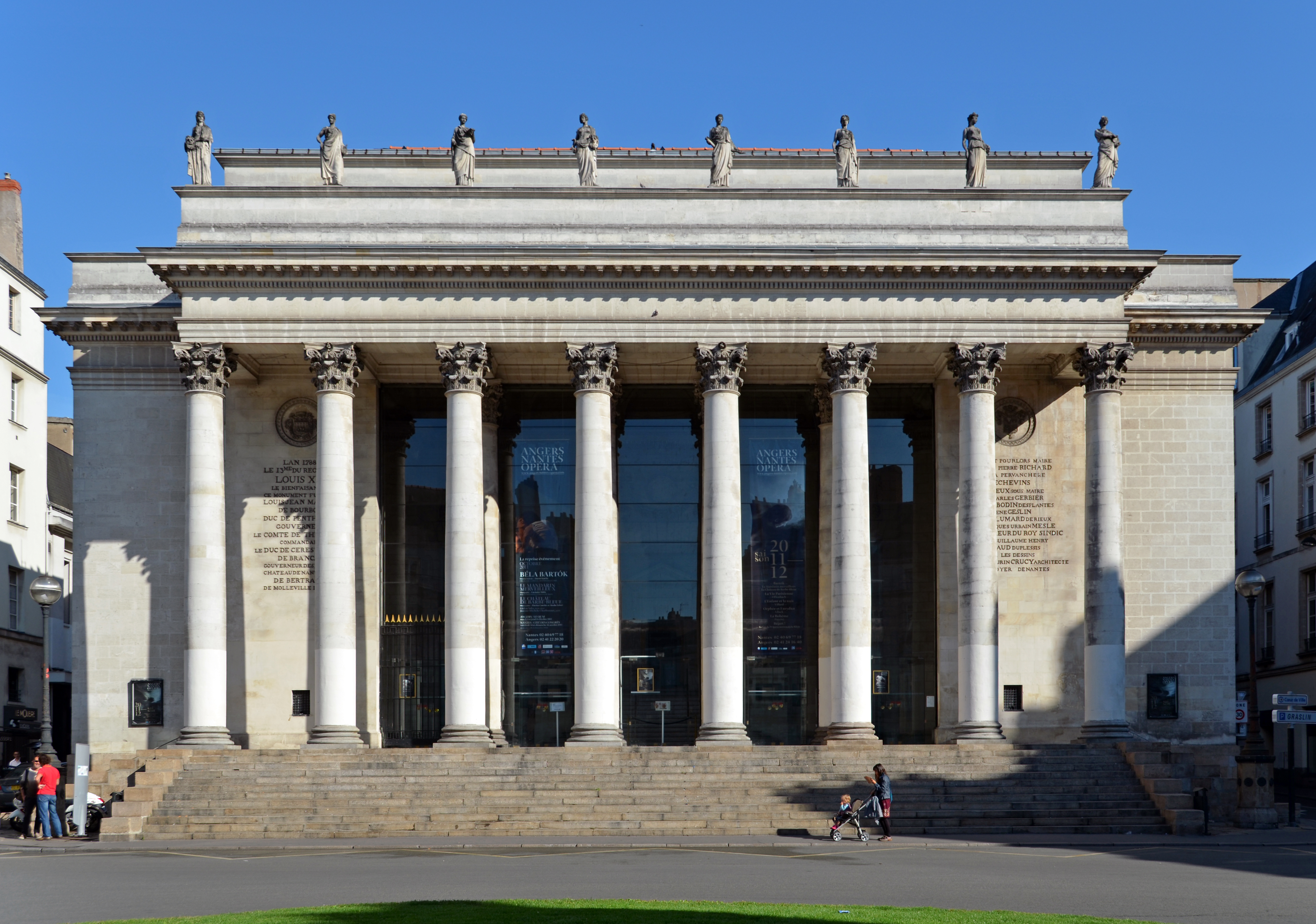
Le Théâtre Graslin, venue of the 4th edition.

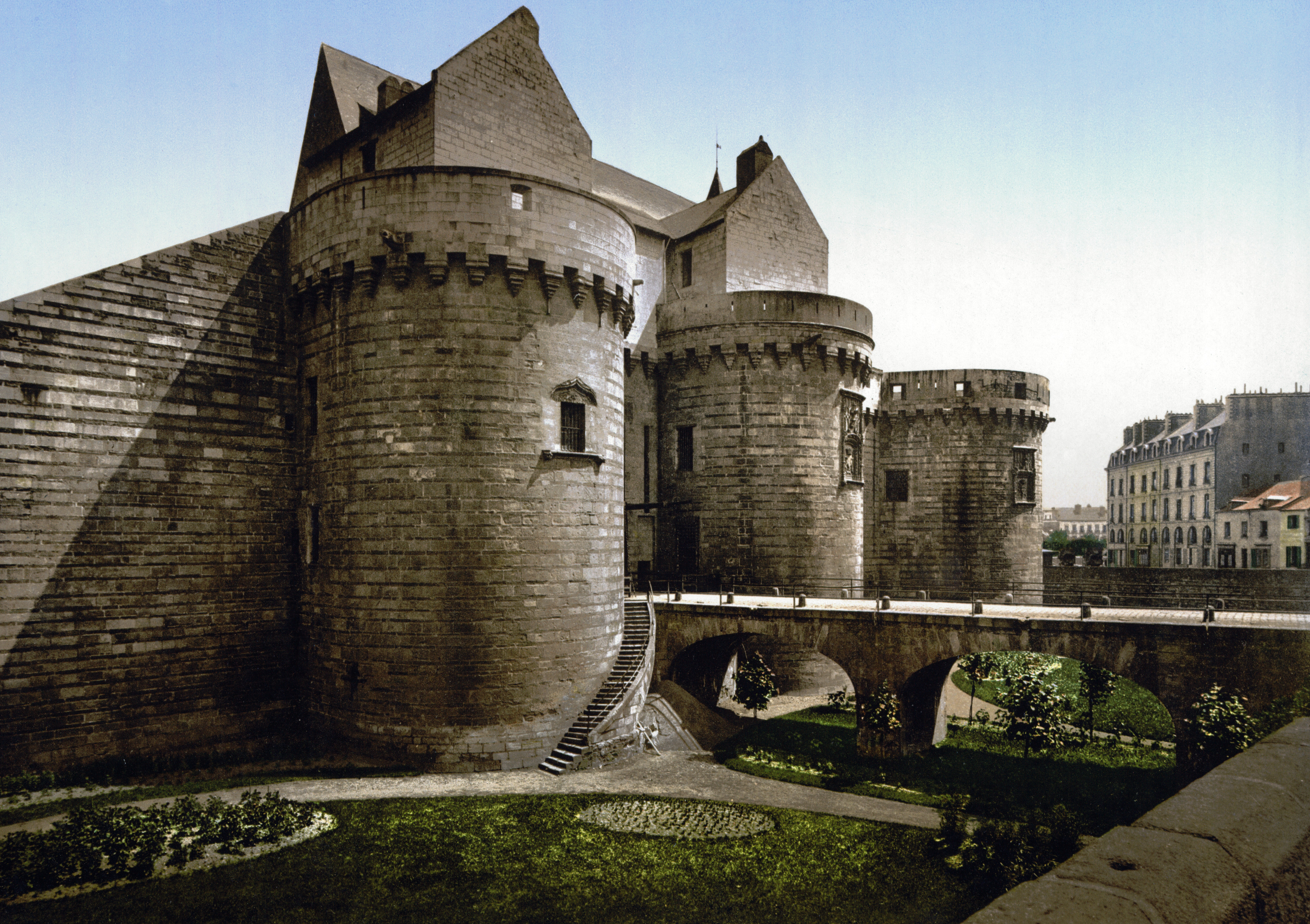
Le Château des ducs de Bretagne, venue of the 5th edition.

=== Season 2 ===
| Year | Location | Venue |
|---|---|---|
| 2021 | No competition | |
| 2022 | Nantes | Hangar 24, Quai Wilson |
| 2023 | No competition | |

== Past Results ==
=== Men's ===
| Year | Champion | Runner-up | Score in final |
|---|---|---|---|
| 2023 | No competition | | |
| 2022 | (France) Victor Crouin | (Egypt) Marwan El Shorbagy | 11-6, 9-11, 6-11, 11-8, 12-10 |
| 2021 | No competition | | |
| 2020 | No competition | | |
| 2019 | (New Zealand) Paul Coll | (Wales) Joel Makin | 12-10, 11-3, 11-9 |
| 2018 | (England) Declan James | (England) James Willstrop | 2-11, 11-9, 5-11, 11-9, 11-9 |
| 2017 | (France) Grégoire Marche | (Switzerland) Nicolas Mueller | 11-9, 7-11, 9-11, 11-5, 11-3 |
| 2016 | (France) Grégoire Marche | (England) Chris Simpson | 11-6, 8-11, 11-6, 11-2 |
| 2015 | (France) Grégoire Marche | (Finland) Henrik Mustonen | 11-8, 11-2, 11-9 |

=== Women's ===
| Year | Champion | Runner-up | Score in final |
|---|---|---|---|
| 2023 | No competition | | |
| 2022 | (Belgium) Nele Gilis | (Belgium) Tinne Gilis | 11-9, 11-6, 11-3 |
| 2021 | No competition | | |
| 2020 | No competition | | |
| 2019 | (France) Camille Serme | (United States) Amanda Sobhy | 9-11, 11-6, 11-8, 11-9 |
| 2018 | (Belgium) Nele Gilis | (England) Emily Whitlock | 4-11, 11-6, 6-11, 12-10, 11-6 |
| 2017 | (England) Fiona Moverley | (Belgium) Nele Gilis | 11-9, 11-9, 11-7 |
| 2016 | (Egypt) Hana Ramadan | (England) Rachael Chadwick | 12-10, 11-4, 2-11, 11-9 |
| 2015 | No competition | | |

== See also ==
- PSA World Tour
- French Squash Federation
