= 2019 European Squash Team Championships =

Squash tournament

- 47th
- Location: (England) Birmingham
- Venue: Edgbaston Priory Club
- Date: 1 – 4 May
- Website europeansquash.com

Results
- Champions: Men (England) England; Women France

The 2019 European Squash Team Championships was the 47th edition of European Squash Team Championships for squash players. The event was held at the Edgbaston Priory Club in Birmingham from 1 to 4 May 2019. The tournament was organised by the European Squash Federation.

The England men's team won their 41st title and the France women's team won their first title defeating England in the final. It was the first time since 2010 that England had been beaten.

== Men's tournament ==
=== Group stage ===
Group A

Pos	Team	P	W	L	Pts
1	France	3	3	0	6
2	Scotland	3	2	1	4
3	Germany	3	1	2	2
4	Hungary	3	0	3	0

Group B

Pos	Team	P	W	L	Pts
1	England	3	3	0	6
2	Spain	3	2	1	4
3	Wales	3	1	2	2
4	Switzerland	3	0	3	0

=== Semi-finals ===
England
3
Semi-final 1

Scotland
0

			1	2	3	4	5
1	(England) (Scotland)	Declan James; Greg Lobban	9; 11	14; 12	11; 6	11; 8
2	(England) (Scotland)	Tom Richards; Angus Gillams	11; 7	11; 6	11; 6
3	(England) (Scotland)	Daryl Selby; Rory Stewart	11; 8	13; 11
4	(England) (Scotland)	James Willstrop; Alan Clyne						not played

Spain
2
Semi-final 2

France
1

			1	2	3	4	5
1	(Spain) (France)	Borja Golan; Gregoire Marche	7; 11	11; 9	3; 11	6; 11
2	(Spain) (France)	Edmon López Möller; Victor Crouin	9; 11	11; 7	8; 11	11; 7	11; 1
3	(Spain) (France)	Bernat Jaume; Benjamin Aubert	11; 7	11; 8	11; 7
4	(Spain) (France)	Iker Pajares; Lucas Serme	7; 11	11; 8	10; 12	12; 10

=== Third place ===
Scotland
3
Third place

France
0

			1	2	3	4	5
1	(Scotland) (France)	Greg Lobban; Gregoire Marche	11; 4	11; 6	9; 11	6; 11	11; 6
2	(Scotland) (France)	Alan Clyne; Lucas Serme	11; 6	11; 7	11; 5
3	(Scotland) (France)	Rory Stewart; Victor Crouin	11; 2	11; 1	6; 11	15; 13

=== Final ===
England
3
Final

Spain
1

			1	2	3	4	5
1	(England) (Spain)	Declan James; Borja Golán	13; 11	11; 9	7; 11	6; 11	2; 11
2	(England) (Spain)	James Willstrop; Iker Pajares Bernabeu	11; 8	11; 4	11; 9
3	(England) (Spain)	Daryl Selby; Bernat Jaume	10; 12	11; 7	9; 11	11; 7	11; 6
4	(England) (Spain)	Tom Richards; Edmon López Möller	11; 9

== Women's tournament ==
=== Group stage ===
Group A

Pos	Team	P	W	L	Pts
1	England	3	3	0	6
2	Scotland	3	2	1	4
3	Netherlands	3	1	2	2
4	Wales	3	0	3	0

Group B

Pos	Team	P	W	L	Pts
1	France	3	3	0	6
2	Belgium	3	2	1	4
3	Switzerland	3	1	2	2
4	Spain	3	0	3	0

=== Semi-finals ===
England
3
Semi-final 1

Belgium
0

			1	2	3	4	5
1	(England) (Belgium)	Victoria Lust; Yara Delagrance	11; 7	11; 9	11; 1
2	(England) (Belgium)	Sarah-Jane Perry; Nele Gilis	11; 13	11; 5	11; 4	11; 9
3	(England) (Belgium)	Laura Massaro; Tinne Gilis	8; 11	11; 9	12; 10

France
2
Semi-final 2

Scotland
1

			1	2	3	4	5
1	(France) (Scotland)	Melissa Alves; Georgia Adderley	7; 11	11; 9	9; 11	11; 2	11; 13
2	(France) (Scotland)	Camille Serme; Lisa Aitken	11; 5	11; 6	11; 5
3	(France) (Scotland)	Coline Aumard; Alison Thomson	11; 7	11; 5	11; 1

=== Third place ===
Belgium
2
Third place

Scotland
0

			1	2	3	4	5
1	(Belgium) (Scotland)	Nele Gilis; Lisa Aitken	11; 5	11; 6	11; 6
2	(Belgium) (Scotland)	Tinne Gilis; Alison Thomson	11; 1	11; 5	11; 5
3	(Belgium) (Scotland)	Yara Delagrance; Georgia Adderley						not played

=== Final ===
France
2
Final

England
1

			1	2	3	4	5
1	(France) (England)	Camille Serme; Sarah-Jane Perry	14; 12	3; 11	12; 10	11; 9
2	(France) (England)	Coline Aumard; Laura Massaro	7; 11	11; 4	4; 11	9; 11
3	(France) (England)	Mélissa Alves; Victoria Lust	11; 1	11; 3	8; 11	11; 9
4	(France) (England)	Énora Villard; Millie Tomlinson						not played
