= Women's Open International de Squash de Nantes 2017 =

Open International de Nantes 2017
- 2nd Women's Open International de Nantes

Details
- Event name: Open International de Squash de Nantes 2017
- Location: Nantes France
- Venue: Naves with the Machines of the Isle of Nantes
- Website uk.opensquashnantes.fr

Men's PSA World Tour
- Category: Challenger 15
- Prize money: $15,000
- Year: World Tour 2017

The Women's Open International de Squash de Nantes 2017 is the women's edition of the 2017 Open International de Squash de Nantes, which is a tournament of the PSA World Tour event Challenger (prize money: $15,000).

The event took place at the naves with the Machines of the Isle in Nantes in France from 6 to 10 of September.

Fiona Moverley won her first Open International de Nantes trophy, beating Nele Gilis in the final.

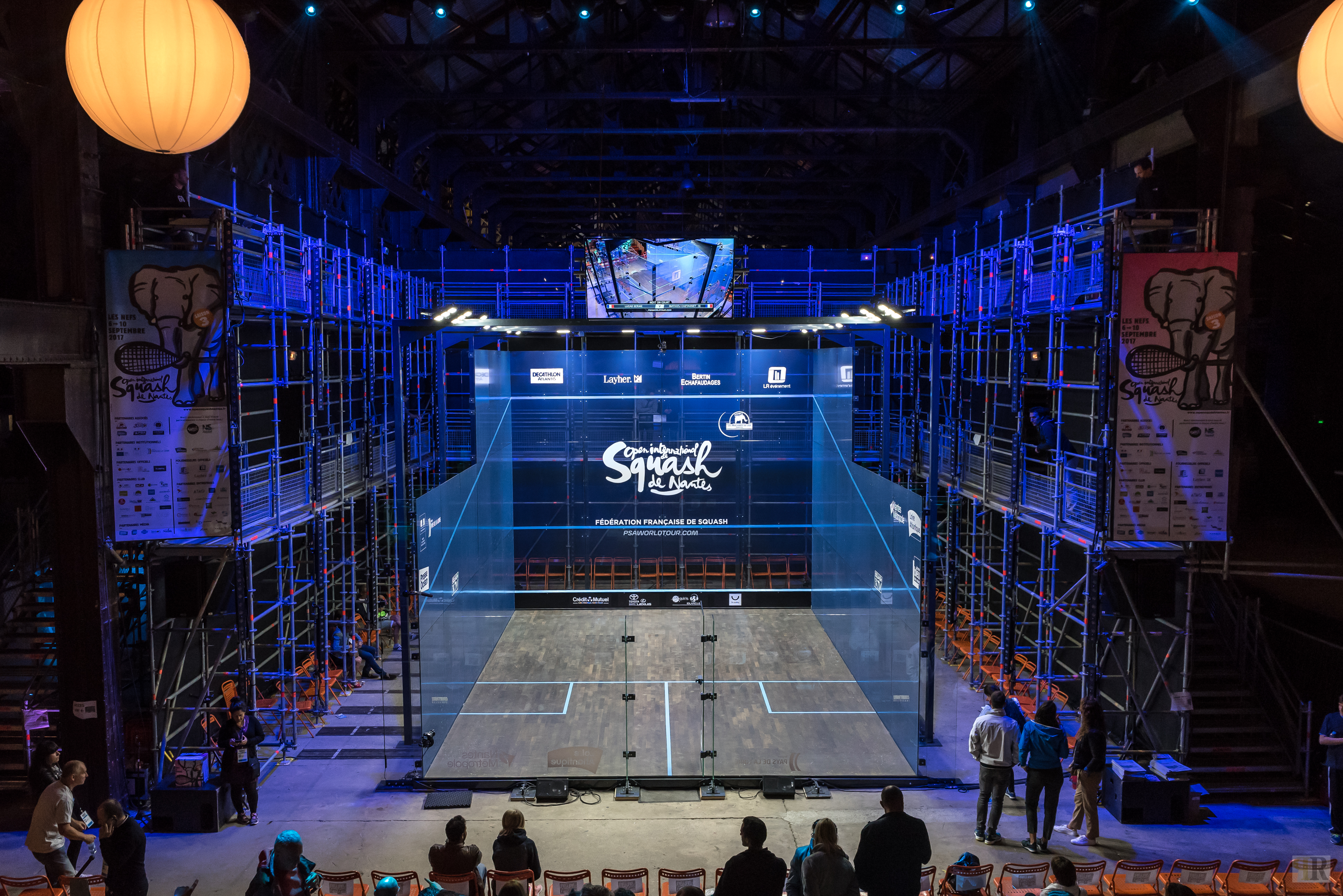
The Naves, venue of the 3rd edition

== Prize money and ranking points ==
For 2017, the prize purse was $15,000. The prize money and points breakdown is as follows:

Prize money Open International de Nantes (2017)
Event	W	F	SF	QF	1R
Points (PSA)	265	175	105	65	40
Prize money	$2,470	$1,690	$1,105	$682.5	$390

== Seeds ==
1. (England) Millie Tomlinson (semifinals)
2. (England) Fiona Moverley (champion)
3. (France) Coline Aumard (quarterfinals)
4. (Belgium) Nele Gilis (final)
5. (Canada) Hollie Naughton (semifinals)
6. (Japan) Misaki Kobayashi (quarterfinals)
7. (Egypt) Zeina Mickawy (first round)
8. (Egypt) Rowan El Araby (first round)

== Draw & results ==
First round 6 September 2017
1	(England) Millie Tomlinson	9	11	11	11
WC	(France) Julie Rossignol	11	5	4	3
Q	(Malaysia) Sivasangari Subramaniam	3	9	11	11	11
8	(Egypt) Rowan El Araby	11	11	9	4	6
7	(Egypt) Zeina Mickawy	8	11	14	5	2
Q	(Egypt) Nouran El Torky	11	5	12	11	11
(Egypt) Hana Moataz	11	3	7	11	7
4	(Belgium) Nele Gilis	9	11	11	9	11
3	(France) Coline Aumard	11	11	11	11
Q	(Egypt) Menna Hamed	7	11	7	6
(England) Julianne Courtice	4	11	11	9	5
5	(Canada) Hollie Naughton	11	7	3	11	11
6	(Japan) Misaki Kobayashi	9	11	11	11
(England) Rachael Chadwick	11	6	6	8
Q	(South Africa) Alexandra Fuller	8	8	11	8
2	(England) Fiona Moverley	11	11	7	11

Quarter finals 7 & 8 September 2017
1	(England) Millie Tomlinson	6	6	11	11	11
Q	(Malaysia) Sivasangari Subramaniam	11	11	1	9	9
Q	(Egypt) Nouran El Torky	6	10	5
4	(Belgium) Nele Gilis	11	12	11
3	(France) Coline Aumard	3	5	11	11	10
5	(Canada) Hollie Naughton	11	11	6	4	12
6	(Japan) Misaki Kobayashi	2	7	13	11
2	(England) Fiona Moverley	11	11	11	11

Semi finals 9 September 2017
1	(England) Millie Tomlinson	11	13	6	11	3
4	(Belgium) Nele Gilis	7	11	11	13	11
5	(Canada) Hollie Naughton	8	5	4
2	(England) Fiona Moverley	11	11	11

Final; 10 September 2017
4	(Belgium) Nele Gilis	9	9	7
2	(England) Fiona Moverley	11	11	11

== See also ==
- Men's Open International de Squash de Nantes 2017
- Open International de Squash de Nantes
- 2017 PSA World Tour
