= 2023 Women's PSA World Tour Finals =

PSA World Tour Finals
- 5th Women's PSA World Tour Finals
- Location: New Cairo, Egypt
- Venue: EDNC SODIC
- Date: 20–25 June 2023
- Website; Official website
- Prize money: $202,500

Results
- Champion: Nouran Gohar (EGY)
- Runner-up: Hania El Hammamy (EGY)
- Semi-finalists: Nour El Sherbini (EGY); Nour El Tayeb (EGY)

The 2023 CIB Women's PSA World Tour Finals is the women's fifth edition of the PSA World Tour Finals (Prize money : $202,500). The top 8 players in the 2022–23 PSA World Tour are qualified for the event. Unlike the last four years (2019–2022, Mall of Arabia), this edition takes place at EDNC SODIC in New Cairo, Egypt from 20 to 25 June 2023.

It's the fifth edition under the PSA World Tour Finals label after the PSA renamed PSA World Series to current PSA World Tour Finals. CIB remains as the title sponsor.

== PSA World Ranking Points ==
PSA also awards points towards World Ranking. Points are awarded as follows:

PSA World Tour Finals		Ranking Points				
Rank	Prize money US$	Winner	Runner up	3/4	Round-Robin Match Win	Undefeated bonus
World Tour Finals	$200,000	1000	550	200	150	150

=== Match points distribution ===
Points towards the standings are awarded when the following scores:

Match score	Points
2–0 win	4 points
2–1 win	3 points
1–2 loss	1 point
0–2 loss	0 points

== Qualification & Seeds ==
=== Qualification ===
Top eight players at 2022–23 PSA World Tour standings qualifies to Finals.

World Championship
177.5	1st Round	290	2nd Round
475	3rd Round	780	Quarterfinalist
1270	Semifinalist	2090	Runner-up
**3175**	Winner		

Platinum
152.5	1st Round	250	2nd Round
410	3rd Round	675	Quarterfinalist
1100	Semifinalist	1810	Runner-up
**2750**	Winner		

Gold
160	1st Round	260	2nd Round
430	Quarterfinalist	700	Semifinalist
1150	Runner-up	**1750**	Winner

Silver
112.5	1st Round	182.5	2nd Round
300	Quarterfinalist	490	Semifinalist
805	Runner-up	**1225**	Winner

Bronze
80	1st Round	130	2nd Round
215	Quarterfinalist	350	Semifinalist
575	Runner-up	**875**	Winner

Top 16 Women's World Tour Standings 2022–23
Rank	Player	Tournaments Played	EGY (Egypt)	USA (United States)	FRA (France)	EGY (Egypt)	USA (United States)	USA (United States)	SUI (Switzerland)	NZL (New Zealand)	SGP (Singapore)	MYS (Malaysia)	HKG (Hong Kong)	USA (United States)	USA (United States)	USA (United States)	USA (United States)	USA (United States)	USA (United States)	USA (United States)	EGY (Egypt)	CAN (Canada)	GBR (United Kingdom)	USA (United States)	ENG (England)	EGY (Egypt)	Total Points
1	(Egypt) **Nouran Gohar**	10	DNP	**1750**	DNP	1810	DNP	**2750**	DNP	DNP	DNP	DNP	1100	DNP	1810	DNP	DNP	**1225**	DNP	DNP	**1750**	DNP	1810	2090	DNP	**2750**	18845
2	(Egypt) **Nour El Sherbini**	9	DNP	DNP	DNP	1100	DNP	1810	**1750**	DNP	DNP	DNP	1810	DNP	**2750**	DNP	DNP	DNP	DNP	DNP	430	DNP	**2750**	**3175**	DNP	1100	16675
3	(Egypt) **Hania El Hammamy**	9	DNP	DNP	DNP	**2750**	DNP	410	1150	DNP	DNP	DNP	**2750**	DNP	1100	DNP	DNP	DNP	DNP	DNP	1150	DNP	675	1270	DNP	1100	12355
4	(New Zealand) **Joelle King**	14	DNP	DNP	DNP	410	490	1100	DNP	**1225**	**1750**	DNP	1100	DNP	1100	300	300	DNP	DNP	DNP	700	DNP	1100	1270	300	250	11395
5	(Belgium) **Nele Gilis**	16	350	DNP	**875**	410	DNP	410	DNP	490	430	**875**	675	DNP	410	182.5	300	DNP	DNP	350	DNP	DNP	410	780	805	1810	9562.5
6	(Egypt) **Nour El Tayeb**	12	**875**	1150	DNP	410	DNP	1100	430	DNP	1150	DNP	675	DNP	675	300	DNP	DNP	DNP	DNP	DNP	DNP	DNP	780	**1225**	410	9180
7	(United States) Amanda Sobhy‡	12	DNP	700	DNP	1100	**1225**	675	DNP	DNP	700	DNP	DNP	DNP	675	300	DNP	DNP	DNP	DNP	700	**875**	1100	780	182.5	DNP	9012.5
8	(England) **Georgina Kennedy**	14	DNP	430	DNP	250	DNP	DNP	430	DNP	260	DNP	DNP	**875**	675	**1225**	805	490	DNP	DNP	430	DNP	675	780	490	675	8490
9	(United States) **Olivia Fiechter**	14	DNP	430	DNP	675	DNP	250	430	DNP	260	575	DNP	575	250	490	**1225**	182.5	DNP	**875**	DNP	DNP	410	475	DNP	DNP	7102.5
10	(Egypt) Salma Hany	17	575	430	DNP	250	DNP	675	430	182.5	260	DNP	250	215	250	DNP	490	490	DNP	DNP	260	575	410	475	DNP	675	6892.5
11	(Egypt) Rowan Elaraby	14	DNP	700	DNP	250	DNP	675	700	DNP	430	DNP	410	DNP	410	DNP	300	300	DNP	DNP	260	DNP	675	475	182.5	410	6177.5
12	(Wales) Tesni Evans	14	DNP	DNP	350	675	DNP	410	700	805	160	350	DNP	DNP	DNP	300	182.5	DNP	DNP	DNP	260	DNP	250	475	300	675	5892.5
13	(Belgium) Tinne Gilis	13	DNP	DNP	575	410	DNP	410	260	490	430	DNP	DNP	DNP	250	DNP	182.5	DNP	**875**	DNP	430	DNP	410	475	DNP	675	5872.5
14	(United States) Olivia Clyne	15	DNP	260	DNP	410	182.5	410	DNP	182.5	160	DNP	DNP	DNP	410	805	490	805	DNP	575	DNP	350	250	290	DNP	250	5830
15	(England) Sarah-Jane Perry	14	DNP	DNP	DNP	675	DNP	410	260	300	430	DNP	675	DNP	410	182.5	DNP	182.5	DNP	DNP	430	DNP	675	475	182.5	250	5537.5
16	(United States) Sabrina Sobhy	16	DNP	260	DNP	250	300	675	DNP	300	700	DNP	DNP	130	410	182.5	182.5	DNP	350	DNP	260	350	410	475	DNP	250	5485

Bold – Players qualified for the final
(*) – Winners of Platinum's tournaments automatically qualifies for Finals.
(‡) – Withdrew from the PSA World Tour Finals due to an injury.

=== Seeds ===
1. (Egypt) Nouran Gohar **(champion)**
2. (Egypt) Nour El Sherbini (semifinals)
3. (Egypt) Hania El Hammamy (final)
4. (New Zealand) Joelle King (group stage)
5. (Belgium) Nele Gilis (group stage)
6. (Egypt) Nour El Tayeb (semifinals)
7. (England) Georgina Kennedy (group stage)
8. (United States) Olivia Fiechter (group stage)

== Group stage results ==
Times are Eastern European Summer Time (UTC+03:00). To the best of three games.

=== Group A ===
Date	Time	Player 1	Player 2	Score
20 June	19:30	Nouran Gohar (EGY)	Nele Gilis (BEL)	11–6, 11–0
20 June	20:45	Hania El Hammamy (EGY)	Olivia Fiechter (USA)	11–6, 11–7
21 June	20:45	Nouran Gohar (EGY)	Hania El Hammamy (EGY)	10–11, 11–10, 11–4
21 June	22:00	Nele Gilis (BEL)	Olivia Fiechter (USA)	11–10, 4–11, 11–6
22 June	22:00	Nouran Gohar (EGY)	Olivia Fiechter (USA)	11–3, 11–5
23 June	19:30	Hania El Hammamy (EGY)	Nele Gilis (BEL)	11–9, 11–8

==== Standings ====
Pos	Team	Pld	W	L	GF	GA	GD	Pts	Qualification
1	Hania El Hammamy (EGY)	3	3	0	76	55	+21	11	Advancing to Semifinals
2	Nouran Gohar (EGY)	3	2	1	69	46	+23	9	Advancing to Semifinals
3	Nele Gilis (BEL)	3	1	2	49	71	−22	3	
4	Olivia Fiechter (USA)	3	0	3	48	70	−22	1	

Source: PSA World Tour Finals

=== Group B ===
Date	Time	Player 1	Player 2	Score
20 June	22:00	Nour El Sherbini (EGY)	Nour El Tayeb (EGY)	10–11, 11–10, 11–7
21 June	19:30	Joelle King (NZL)	Georgina Kennedy (ENG)	5–11, 11–8, 11–9
22 June	19:30	Nour El Sherbini (EGY)	Joelle King (NZL)	11–3, 11–4
22 June	20:45	Nour El Tayeb (EGY)	Georgina Kennedy (ENG)	11–7, 8–11, 11–8
23 June	20:45	Nour El Sherbini (EGY)	Georgina Kennedy (ENG)	11–3, 11–4
23 June	22:00	Joelle King (NZL)	Nour El Tayeb (EGY)	11–10, 11–8

==== Standings ====
Pos	Team	Pld	W	L	GF	GA	GD	Pts	Qualification
1	Nour El Sherbini (EGY)	3	3	0	76	42	+34	11	Advancing to Semifinals
2	Nour El Tayeb (EGY)	3	1	2	76	80	−4	6	Advancing to Semifinals
3	Georgina Kennedy (ENG)	3	1	2	61	60	+1	4	
4	Joelle King (NZL)	3	1	2	52	72	−20	3	

Source: PSA World Tour Finals

== Knockout stage ==
Semi finals (24 June)
3	Hania El Hammamy (EGY)	11	11
6	Nour El Tayeb (EGY)	3	8
2	Nour El Sherbini (EGY)	7	11	8
1	Nouran Gohar (EGY)	11	10	11

Final (25 June)
3	Hania El Hammamy (EGY)	11	9	11	6	10
1	Nouran Gohar (EGY)	10	11	9	11	12

=== Semifinal ===
To the best of three games.

Date	Time	Player 1	Player 2	Score
24 June	20:00	Hania El Hammamy (EGY)	Nour El Tayeb (EGY)	11–3, 11–8
24 June	21:15	Nour El Sherbini (EGY)	Nouran Gohar (EGY)	11–7, 10–11, 11–8

=== Final ===
To the best of five games.

Date	Time	Player 1	Player 2	Score
25 June	21:00	Hania El Hammamy (EGY)	Nouran Gohar (EGY)	10–11, 11–9, 9–11, 11–6, 12–10

2023 Women's PSA World Tour Finals winner
(Egypt)
Nouran Gohar
Second title

== See also ==
- 2023 Men's PSA World Tour Finals
- 2022–23 PSA World Tour Finals
