= Men's Open International de Squash de Nantes 2017 =

Open International de Nantes 2017
- 3rd Men's Open International de Nantes

Details
- Event name: Open International de Squash de Nantes 2017
- Location: Nantes France
- Venue: Naves with the Machines of the Isle of Nantes
- Website uk.opensquashnantes.fr

Men's Winner
- Category: International 25
- Prize money: $25,000
- Year: World Tour 2017

The Men's Open International de Squash de Nantes 2017 is the men's edition of the 2017 Open International de Squash de Nantes, which is a tournament of the PSA World Tour event International (Prize money: $25,000).

The event took place at the naves with the Machines of the Isle in Nantes in France from 6 to 10 of September.

Grégoire Marche won his third Open International de Nantes trophy, beating Nicolas Mueller in the final.

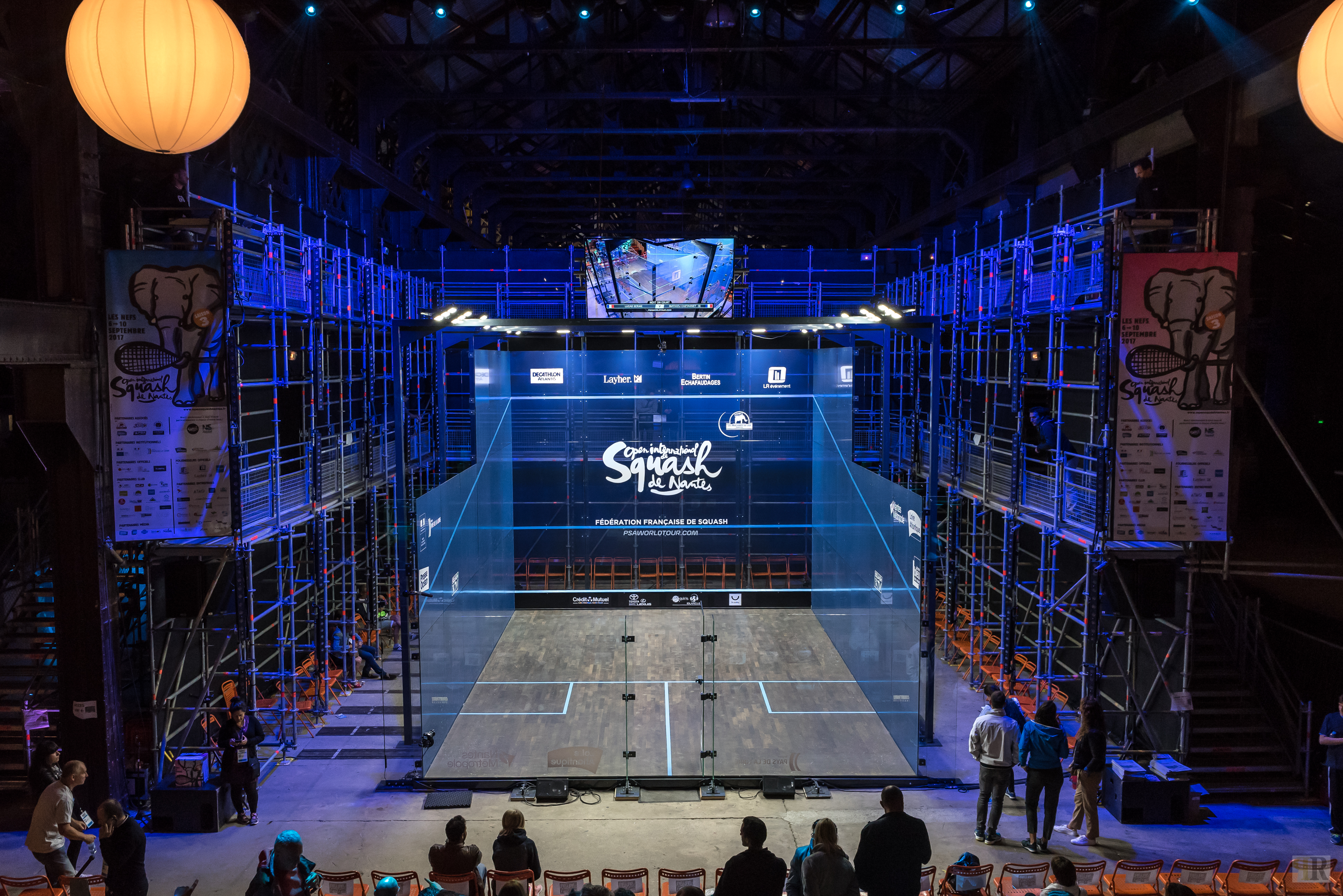
The Naves, venue of the 3rd edition

== Prize money and ranking points ==
For 2017, the prize purse was $25,000. The prize money and points breakdown is as follows:

Prize Money Open International de Nantes (2017)
Event	W	F	SF	QF	1R
Points (PSA)	440	290	175	105	60
Prize money	$3,800	$2,600	$1,700	$1,050	$600

== Seeds ==
1. (France) Grégoire Marche (Champion)
2. (France) Mathieu Castagnet (quarterfinals)
3. (Egypt) Mazen Hesham (semifinals)
4. (Switzerland) Nicolas Mueller (Final)
5. (England) Chris Simpson (quarterfinals)
6. (England) Declan James (first round)
7. (Qatar) Abdulla Mohd Al Tamimi (quarterfinals)
8. (Egypt) Mohamed Ali Reda (first round)

== Draw and results ==
First round 6 September 2017
1	(France) Grégoire Marche	8	11	11	11
Q	(Egypt) Mazen Gamal	11	4	4	4
Q	(Egypt) Shehab Essam	7	11	8	4
5	(England) Chris Simpson	11	4	11	11
8	(Egypt) Mohammed Ali Reda	5	7	10
(Finland) Olli Tuominen	11	11	12
Q	(England) George Parker	6	14	7	7
3	(Egypt) Mazen Hesham	11	12	11	11
4	(Switzerland) Nicolas Mueller	11	9	11	11
Q	(Jordan) Mohammad Alsarraj	7	11	5	6
WC	(France) Auguste Dussourd	8	11	9	4
7	(Qatar) Abdulla Mohd Al Tamimi	11	5	11	11
6	(England) Declan James	10	8	6
(England) Ben Coleman	12	11	11
(France) Lucas Serme	6	7	11	5
2	(France) Mathieu Castagnet	11	11	5	11

Quarter finals 7 & 8 September 2017
1	(France) Grégoire Marche	11	11	11
5	(England) Chris Simpson	6	4	7
(Finland) Olli Tuominen	6	4	12	7
3	(Egypt) Mazen Hesham	11	11	10	11
4	(Switzerland) Nicolas Mueller	11	11	6	11
7	(Qatar) Abdulla Mohd Al Tamimi	7	7	11	4
(England) Ben Coleman	5	11	11	7
2	(France) Mathieu Castagnet	11	8	9	4	rtd

Semi finals 9 September 2017
1	(France) Grégoire Marche	11	7	11	14
3	(Egypt) Mazen Hesham	6	11	1	12
4	(Switzerland) Nicolas Mueller	11	9	11	11
(England) Ben Coleman	5	11	6	4

Final; 10 September 2017
1	(France) Grégoire Marche	11	7	9	11	11
4	(Switzerland) Nicolas Mueller	9	11	11	5	3

== See also ==
- Women's Open International de Squash de Nantes 2017
- Open International de Squash de Nantes
- 2017 PSA World Tour
