= Women's Open International de Squash de Nantes 2016 =

Squash tournament in France

Open International de Nantes 2016
- 1st Women's Open International de Nantes

Details
- Event name: Open International de Squash de Nantes 2016
- Location: Nantes France
- Venue: Cité International des Congrès
- Website www.opensquashnantes.fr

Men's PSA World Tour
- Category: Challenger 5
- Prize money: $5,000
- Year: World Tour 2016

The Women's Open International de Squash de Nantes 2016 is the women's edition of the 2016 Open International de Squash de Nantes, which is a tournament of the PSA World Tour event Challenger (prize money: $5,000). The event took place at La Maison du Squash in Sautron and at La Cité International des Congrès in Nantes in France from 8 to 11 of September. Hana Ramadan won her first Open International de Nantes trophy, beating Rachael Chadwick in the final.

== Prize money and ranking points ==
For 2016, the prize purse was $5,000. The prize money and points breakdown is as follows:

Prize money Open International de Nantes (2016)
Event	W	F	SF	QF	1R
Points (PSA)	90	60	35	20	13
Prize money	$950	$650	$425	$260	$150

== Seeds ==
1. (France) Chloé Mesic (quarterfinals)
2. (South Africa) Alexandra Fuller (quarterfinals)
3. (Egypt) Hana Ramadan (champion)
4. (France) Énora Villard (first round)
5. (Switzerland) Nadia Pfister (quarterfinals)
6. (England) Rachael Chadwick (final)
7. (Netherlands) Tessa Ter Sluis (quarterfinals)
8. (France) Laura Pomportes (semifinals)

== Draw and results ==
First round 8 September 2016
1	(France) Chloé Mesic	11	11	12
(Wales) Nia Davies	3	4	10
Q	(Spain) Marina De Juan Gallach	6	4	4
8	(France) Laura Pomportes	11	11	11
7	(Netherlands) Tessa Ter Sluis	10	11	12	11
Q	(Switzerland) Cindy Merlo	12	6	10	9
WC	(France) Sarah Mekhalfi	4	1	5
3	(Egypt) Hana Ramadan	11	11	11
4	(France) Énora Villard	3	11	10	9
Q	(England) Julianne Courtice	11	9	12	11
(Spain) Marta Latorre Ramírez	11	11	10	9	12
5	(Switzerland) Nadia Pfister	9	9	12	11	14
6	(England) Rachael Chadwick	11	11	11
Q	(France) Charlotte Delsinne	4	8	5
(France) Elise Romba	4	5	6
2	(South Africa) Alexandra Fuller	11	11	11

Quarter finals 9 September 2016
1	(France) Chloé Mesic	8	6	6
8	(France) Laura Pomportes	11	11	11
7	(Netherlands) Tessa Ter Sluis	7	6	10
3	(Egypt) Hana Ramadan	11	11	12
Q	(England) Julianne Courtice	11	11	11
5	(Switzerland) Nadia Pfister	3	3	6
6	(England) Rachael Chadwick	16	7	11	11
2	(South Africa) Alexandra Fuller	14	11	8	7

Semi finals 10 September 2016
8	(France) Laura Pomportes	9	9	9
3	(Egypt) Hana Ramadan	11	11	11
Q	(England) Julianne Courtice	12	11	12	11	8
6	(England) Rachael Chadwick	10	13	14	8	11

Final; 11 September 2016
3	(Egypt) Hana Ramadan	12	11	2	11
6	(England) Rachael Chadwick	10	4	11	9

== See also ==
- Men's Open International de Squash de Nantes 2016
- Open International de Squash de Nantes
- 2016 PSA World Tour
