= 2023 Men's PSA World Tour Finals =

PSA World Tour Finals
- 5th Men's PSA World Tour Finals
- Location: New Cairo, Egypt
- Venue: EDNC SODIC
- Date: 20–25 June 2023
- Website; Official website
- Prize money: $202,500

Results
- Champion: Mostafa Asal (EGY)
- Runner-up: Diego Elías (PER)
- Semi-finalists: Mohamed El Shorbagy (ENG); Ali Farag (EGY)

The 2023 CIB Men's PSA World Tour Finals is the men's fifth edition of the PSA World Tour Finals (Prize money : $202,500). The top 8 players in the 2022–23 PSA World Tour are qualified for the event. Unlike the last four years (2019–2022, Mall of Arabia), this edition takes place at EDNC SODIC in New Cairo, Egypt from 20 to 25 June 2023.

It's the fifth edition under the PSA World Tour Finals label after the PSA renamed PSA World Series to current PSA World Tour Finals. CIB remains as the title sponsor.

== PSA World Ranking Points ==
PSA also awards points towards World Ranking. Points are awarded as follows:

PSA World Tour Finals		Ranking Points				
Rank	Prize money US$	Winner	Runner up	3/4	Round-Robin Match Win	Undefeated bonus
World Tour Finals	$200,000	1000	550	200	150	150

=== Match points distribution ===
Points towards the standings are awarded when the following scores:

Match score	Points
2–0 win	4 points
2–1 win	3 points
1–2 loss	1 point
0–2 loss	0 points

== Qualification & Seeds ==
=== Qualification ===
Top eight players at 2022–23 PSA World Tour standings qualifies to Finals.

World Championship
177.5	1st Round	290	2nd Round
475	3rd Round	780	Quarterfinalist
1270	Semifinalist	2090	Runner-up
**3175**	Winner		

Platinum
152.5	1st Round	250	2nd Round
410	3rd Round	675	Quarterfinalist
1100	Semifinalist	1810	Runner-up
**2750**	Winner		

Gold
160	1st Round	260	2nd Round
430	Quarterfinalist	700	Semifinalist
1150	Runner-up	**1750**	Winner

Silver
112.5	1st Round	182.5	2nd Round
300	Quarterfinalist	490	Semifinalist
805	Runner-up	**1225**	Winner

Bronze
80	1st Round	130	2nd Round
215	Quarterfinalist	350	Semifinalist
575	Runner-up	**875**	Winner

Top 16 Men's PSA World Tour Standings 2022–23
Rank	Player	Tournaments Played	EGY (Egypt)	QAT (Qatar)	FRA (France)	EGY (Egypt)	USA (United States)	USA (United States)	SUI (Switzerland)	NZL (New Zealand)	SGP (Singapore)	MYS (Malaysia)	HKG (Hong Kong)	HKG (Hong Kong)	USA (United States)	USA (United States)	USA (United States)	USA (United States)	CAN (Canada)	USA (United States)	EGY (Egypt)	ENG (England)	ENG (England)	GBR (United Kingdom)	USA (United States)	ENG (England)	EGY (Egypt)	Total Points
1	(Peru) **Diego Elías**	16	DNP	675	DNP	1100	490	**2750**	700	DNP	1150	DNP	1810	DNP	DNP	**2750**	**1225**	**1225**	DNP	DNP	700	260	260	1810	780	DNP	1100	18785
2	(Egypt) **Ali Farag**	12	DNP	410	DNP	**2750**	DNP	1810	260	DNP	DNP	DNP	DNP	DNP	DNP	DNP	DNP	300	DNP	DNP	430	700	430	**2750**	**3175**	**1225**	**2750**	16990
3	(England) **Mohd. El Shorbagy**	15	DNP	**2750**	DNP	410	**1225**	1100	DNP	**1225**	**1750**	DNP	1100	DNP	1150	250	DNP	DNP	DNP	DNP	**1750**	430	260	410	1270	DNP	1100	16180
4	(Egypt) **Mostafa Asal**	12	DNP	1100	DNP	1100	DNP	250	**1750**	DNP	700	DNP	**2750**	DNP	**1750**	410	DNP	DNP	DNP	DNP	260	700	DNP	DNP	1270	DNP	1810	13850
5	(Egypt) Marw. El Shorbagy‡	18	DNP	675	575	675	805	1100	1150	DNP	DNP	215	675	**875**	700	1810	DNP	805	DNP	DNP	430	260	260	675	475	DNP	410	12570
6	(New Zealand) **Paul Coll**	14	DNP	250	DNP	1810	DNP	675	430	805	260	DNP	1100	DNP	DNP	1100	300	DNP	DNP	DNP	260	**1750**	DNP	1100	780	DNP	675	11295
7	(Egypt) **Mazen Hesham**	17	DNP	DNP	DNP	675	490	410	DNP	DNP	430	**875**	675	575	700	675	805	300	DNP	DNP	430	430	700	1100	780	DNP	675	10725
8	(France) **Victor Crouin**	18	575	1810	**875**	410	DNP	250	DNP	490	430	DNP	675	DNP	430	675	DNP	DNP	575	**875**	DNP	260	260	675	290	300	675	10530
9	(Egypt) **Tarek Momen**	15	DNP	1100	DNP	675	DNP	675	430	DNP	430	575	DNP	DNP	DNP	675	490	182.5	DNP	DNP	1150	430	DNP	675	780	490	410	9167.5
10	(Egypt) Youssef Soliman	19	**875**	410	DNP	250	182.5	675	260	DNP	DNP	DNP	675	350	430	410	300	490	DNP	DNP	260	160	1150	410	177.5	182.5	410	8057.5
11	(Wales) Joel Makin	15	DNP	250	DNP	DNP	DNP	675	430	DNP	700	350	DNP	DNP	DNP	250	DNP	300	**875**	DNP	700	1150	430	250	475	490	410	7735
12	(Egypt) Karim Abdel Gawad	7	DNP	DNP	DNP	DNP	DNP	DNP	DNP	DNP	DNP	DNP	DNP	DNP	DNP	DNP	DNP	DNP	DNP	DNP	260	260	**1750**	675	2090	805	250	6090
13	(Colombia) Miguel Á Rodríguez	15	DNP	675	DNP	DNP	300	410	160	182.5	260	215	250	DNP	DNP	1100	300	300	350	DNP	DNP	DNP	DNP	250	475	DNP	250	5477.5
14	(Egypt) Fares Dessouky	11	DNP	410	DNP	675	DNP	410	700	DNP	160	DNP	DNP	DNP	DNP	675	490	DNP	DNP	DNP	430	DNP	DNP	DNP	290	300	410	4950
15	(Switzerland) Nicolas Müller	17	DNP	250	DNP	250	DNP	DNP	430	DNP	260	350	250	130	260	410	DNP	DNP	215	DNP	160	260	260	410	177.5	300	250	4622.5
16	(France) Grégoire Marche	17	DNP	250	130	410	DNP	250	260	DNP	260	DNP	DNP	DNP	430	250	300	182.5	DNP	DNP	260	160	260	250	290	112.5	152.5	4207.5

Bold – Players qualified for the final
(*) – Winners of Platinum's tournaments automatically qualifies for Finals.
(‡) – Withdrew one day before PSA World Tour Finals due to an injury.

=== Seeds ===
1. (Peru) Diego Elías (final)
2. (Egypt) Ali Farag (semifinals)
3. (England) Mohamed El Shorbagy (semifinals)
4. (Egypt) Mostafa Asal **(champion)**
5. (New Zealand) Paul Coll (group stage)
6. (Egypt) Mazen Hesham (group stage)
7. (France) Victor Crouin (group stage)
8. (Egypt) Tarek Momen (group stage)

== Group stage results ==
Times are Eastern European Summer Time (UTC+03:00). To the best of three games.

=== Group A ===
Date	Time	Player 1	Player 2	Score
20 June	20:00	Diego Elías (PER)	Mazen Hesham (EGY)	11–8, 11–5
20 June	21:15	Mostafa Asal (EGY)	Victor Crouin (FRA)	11–3, 11–9
21 June	21:15	Diego Elías (PER)	Mostafa Asal (EGY)	10–11, 11–7, 12–10
21 June	22:30	Mazen Hesham (EGY)	Victor Crouin (FRA)	11–7, 11–6
22 June	22:30	Diego Elías (PER)	Victor Crouin (FRA)	11–9, 11–7
23 June	22:30	Mostafa Asal (EGY)	Mazen Hesham (EGY)	2–11, 11–8, 11–5

==== Standings ====
Pos	Team	Pld	W	L	GF	GA	GD	Pts	Qualification
1	Diego Elías (PER)	3	2	1	72	57	+15	9	Advancing to Semifinals
2	Mostafa Asal (EGY)	3	2	1	79	64	+15	8	Advancing to Semifinals
3	Mazen Hesham (EGY)	3	2	1	58	59	−1	7	
4	Victor Crouin (FRA)	3	0	3	41	66	−25	0	

Source: PSA World Tour Finals

=== Group B ===
Date	Time	Player 1	Player 2	Score
20 June	22:30	Ali Farag (EGY)	Paul Coll (NZL)	9–11, 11–3, 11–7
21 June	20:00	Mohamed El Shorbagy (ENG)	Tarek Momen (EGY)	11–6, 11–4
22 June	20:00	Ali Farag (EGY)	Mohamed El Shorbagy (ENG)	9–11, 11–5, 11–3
22 June	21:15	Paul Coll (NZL)	Tarek Momen (EGY)	11–6, 11–3
23 June	20:00	Mohamed El Shorbagy (ENG)	Paul Coll (NZL)	11–8, 11–10
23 June	21:15	Ali Farag (EGY)	Tarek Momen (EGY)	w/o

==== Standings ====
Pos	Team	Pld	W	L	GF	GA	GD	Pts	Qualification
1	Ali Farag (EGY)	3	3	0	84	40	+44	10	Advancing to Semifinals
2	Mohamed El Shorbagy (ENG)	3	2	1	63	59	+4	8	Advancing to Semifinals
3	Paul Coll (NZL)	3	1	2	61	48	+13	4	
4	Tarek Momen (EGY)	3	0	3	19	66	−47	1	

Source: PSA World Tour Finals

== Knockout stage ==
Semi finals (24 June)
1	Diego Elías (PER)	11	11
3	Mohamed El Shorbagy (ENG)	5	6
2	Ali Farag (EGY)	2	5
4	Mostafa Asal (EGY)	11	11

Final (25 June)
1	Diego Elías (PER)	11	6	3	5
4	Mostafa Asal (EGY)	9	11	11	11

=== Semifinal ===
To the best of three games.

Date	Time	Player 1	Player 2	Score
24 June	20:35	Diego Elías (PER)	Mohamed El Shorbagy (ENG)	11–5, 11–6
24 June	21:40	Ali Farag (EGY)	Mostafa Asal (EGY)	11–2, 11–5

=== Final ===
To the best of five games.

Date	Time	Player 1	Player 2	Score
25 June	21:45	Diego Elías (PER)	Mostafa Asal (EGY)	9–11, 11–6, 11–3, 11–5

2023 Men's PSA World Tour Finals winner
(Egypt)
Mostafa Asal
Third title

== See also ==
- 2023 Women's PSA World Tour Finals
- 2022–23 PSA World Tour Finals
