= Men's Open International de Squash de Nantes 2016 =

Open International de Nantes 2016
- 2nd Men's Open International de Nantes

Details
- Event name: Open International de Squash de Nantes 2016
- Location: Nantes France
- Venue: Cité International des Congrès
- Website www.opensquashnantes.fr

Men's Winner
- Category: International 25
- Prize money: $25,000
- Year: World Tour 2016

The Men's Open International de Squash de Nantes 2016 is the men's edition of the 2016 Open International de Squash de Nantes, which is a tournament of the PSA World Tour event International (Prize money: $25,000). The event took place at La Cité International des Congrès in Nantes in France from 7 to 11 of September. Grégoire Marche won his second Open International de Nantes trophy, beating Chris Simpson in the final.

== Prize money and ranking points ==
For 2016, the prize purse was $25,000. The prize money and points breakdown is as follows:

Prize Money Open International de Nantes (2016)
Event	W	F	SF	QF	1R
Points (PSA)	440	290	175	105	60
Prize money	$3,800	$2,600	$1,700	$1,050	$600

== Seeds ==
1. (England) Daryl Selby (semifinals)
2. (England) Chris Simpson (final)
3. (England) Tom Richards (semifinals)
4. (France) Grégoire Marche (champion)
5. (England) Declan James (quarterfinals)
6. (Egypt) Karim Ali Fathi (quarterfinals)
7. (United States) Todd Harrity (first round)
8. (Finland) Olli Tuominen (quarterfinals)

== Draw and results ==
First round 7 & 8 September 2016
1	(England) Daryl Selby	12	11	11
Q	(England) Jaymie Haycocks	10	4	5
Q	(Wales) Joel Makin	12	11	11
7	(United States) Todd Harrity	10	8	5
8	(Finland) Olli Tuominen	7	2	11	11	11
(Germany) Jens Schoor	11	11	8	4	6
Q	(England) Richie Fallows	5	2	4
4	(France) Grégoire Marche	11	11	11
3	(England) Tom Richards	11	11	11
(India) Mahesh Mangaonkar	4	9	8
(England) Ben Coleman	7	11	7
6	(Egypt) Karim Ali Fathi	11	13	11
5	(England) Declan James	11	11	11
Q	(France) Christophe André	6	2	7
WC	(France) Geoffrey Demont	6	8	7
2	(England) Chris Simpson	11	11	11

Quarter finals 9 September 2016
1	(England) Daryl Selby	11	11	11
Q	(Wales) Joel Makin	9	5	8
8	(Finland) Olli Tuominen	11	6	7	6
4	(France) Grégoire Marche	4	11	11	11
3	(England) Tom Richards	11	11	9	8	11
6	(Egypt) Karim Ali Fathi	5	9	11	11	4
5	(England) Declan James	5	11	6	7
2	(England) Chris Simpson	11	4	11	11

Semi finals 10 September 2016
1	(England) Daryl Selby	7	6	5
4	(France) Grégoire Marche	11	11	11
3	(England) Tom Richards	4	11	9	4
2	(England) Chris Simpson	11	7	11	11

Final; 11 September 2016
4	(France) Grégoire Marche	11	8	11	11
2	(England) Chris Simpson	6	11	6	2

== See also ==
- Women's Open International de Squash de Nantes 2016
- Open International de Squash de Nantes
- 2016 PSA World Tour
