= Millie Tomlinson =

British squash player (born 1992)

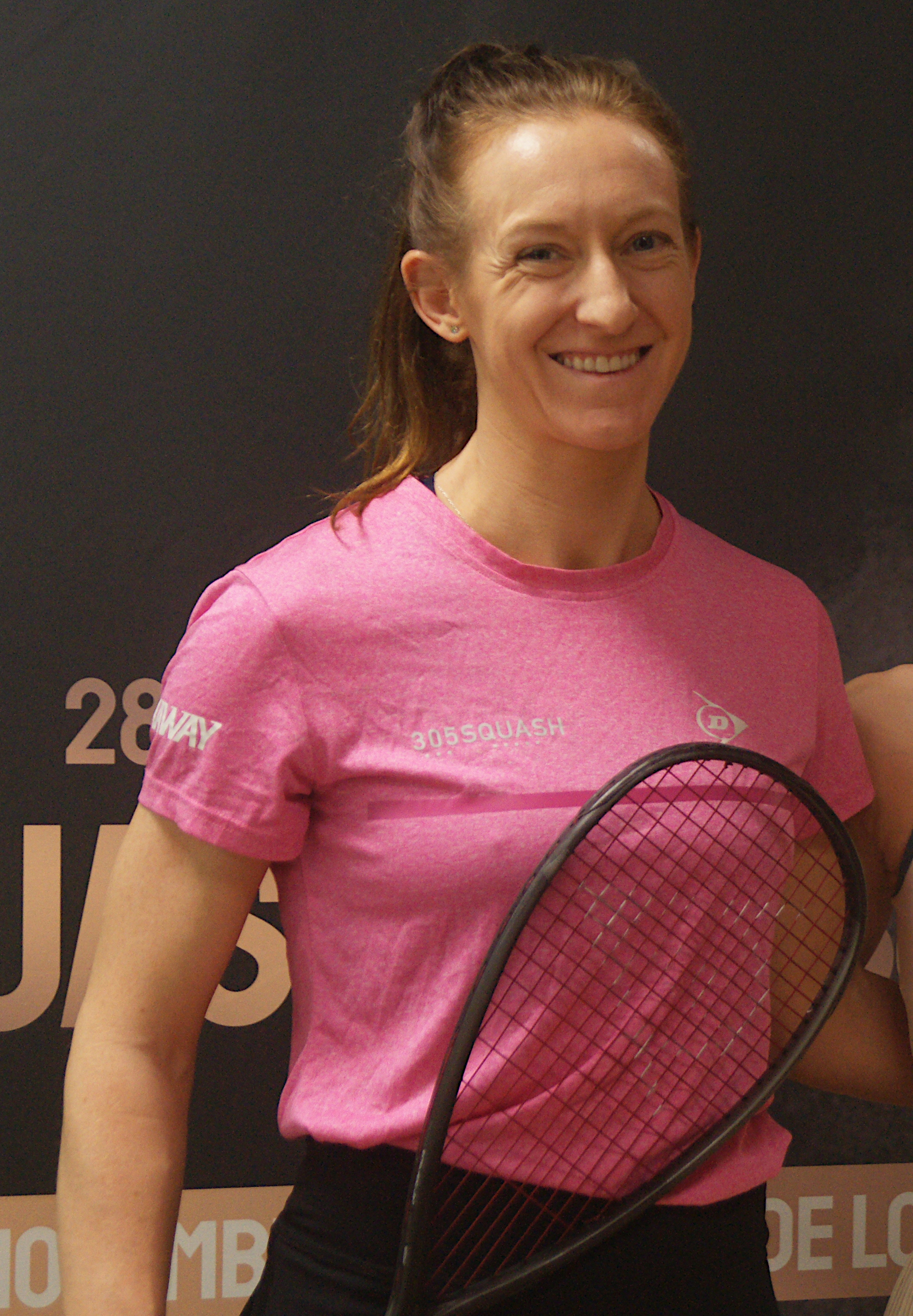
- Millie Tomlinson (2025)

Personal information
- Born: 27 April 1992 (age 34) Derby, England
- Website: mtevents.org

Sport
- Country: England
- Handedness: Right Handed
- Turned pro: 2015
- Coached by: Tania Bailey
- Retired: Active
- Racquet used: Dunlop

Women's singles
- Highest ranking: No. 20 (July 2019)
- Current ranking: No. 68 (April 2026)
Medal record
Women's squash
Representing England
European Team Championships
Silver medal – second place	2019 Birmingham	Team

Millie Tomlinson (born 27 April 1992) is a professional squash player who represents England. She reached a career-high world ranking of World No. 20 in July 2019.

== Biography ==
She went to Yale University and she played on the Varsity Squash Team. During her tenure at Yale, the team won the National Squash Championships.

Tomlinson won a silver medal for the England women's national squash team at the 2019 European Squash Team Championships in Birmingham.

She has won 14 PSA tour titles in her career to date.
