= Benjamin Aubert =

French squash player (born 1997)

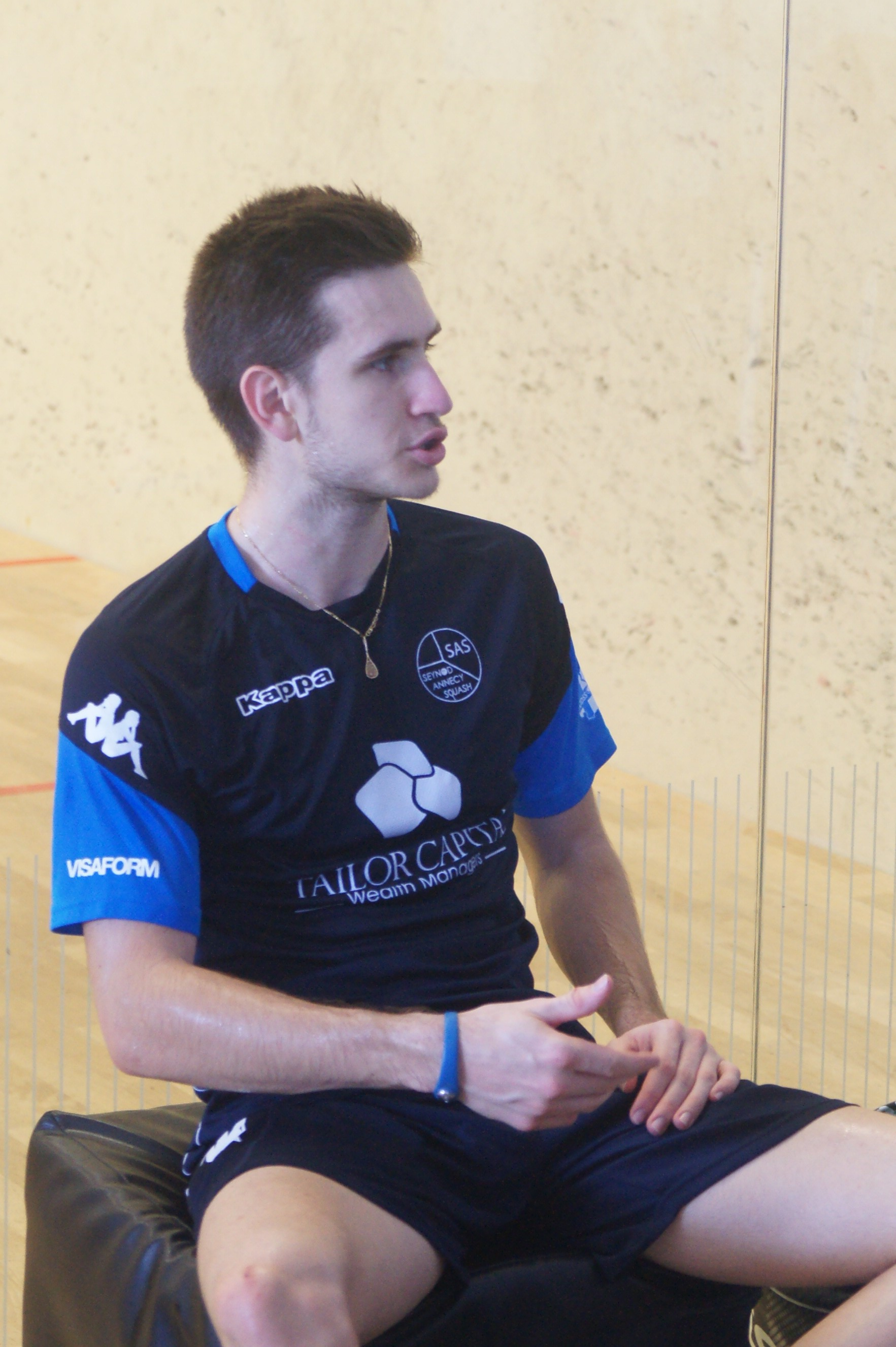
- Benjamin Aubert in 2018

Personal information
- Full name: Benjamin Aubert
- Born: 13 November 1997 (age 28) Amiens, France
- Height: 1.76 m (5 ft 9 in)
- Weight: 60 kg (132 lb)
- Website: https://benjamin-aubert-squash.com

Sport
- Country: France
- Handedness: Right-handed
- Turned pro: 2016
- Coached by: Renan LAVIGNE
- Retired: Active
- Racquet used: Tecnifibre

Men's singles
- Highest ranking: No. 55 (April 2020)
- Current ranking: No. 55 (April 2020)
- Title: 4
- Tour final: 8
- Updated on June 2020

Benjamin Aubert (born 13 November 1997, in Amiens) is a French professional squash player. As of April 2020, he was ranked number 55 in the world.
