= Château des ducs de Bretagne =

Castle in Nantes, Loire-Atlantique, France

Château des ducs de Bretagne Castle of the Dukes of Brittany
- Nantes, Pays de la Loire, France
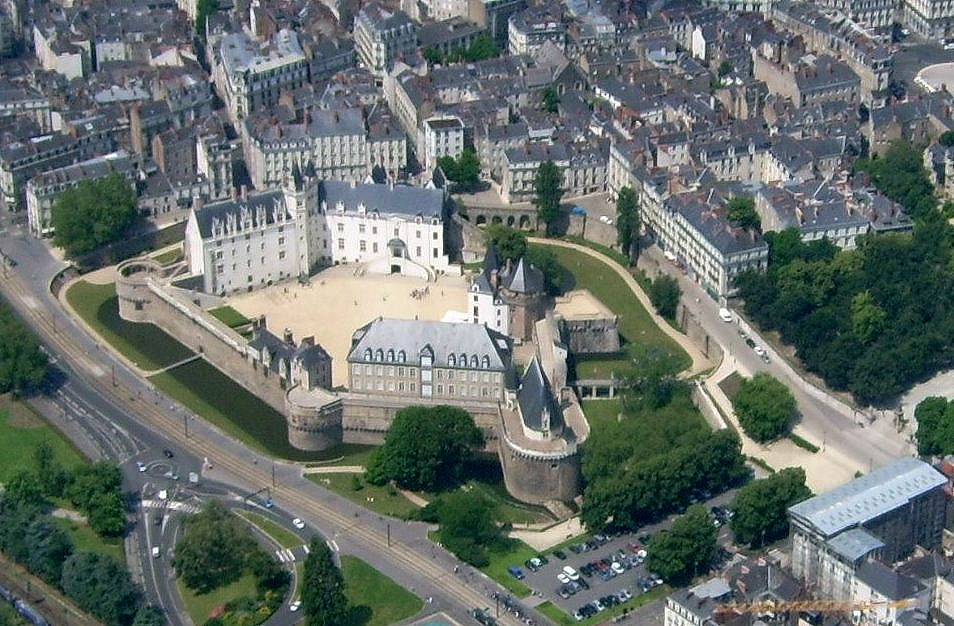
- The château seen from the air

Site information
- Type: Fortified château
- Owner: Ville de Nantes
- Controlled by: Brittany until 1532, France until present
- Open to the public: Yes
- Condition: Restored

Location
- Coordinates: 47°12′57″N 1°33′0″W

Site history
- Built: 1207, rebuilt 1466
- Built by: Guy of Thouars, Duke of Brittany
- In use: 1207–1862
- Events: Edict of Nantes

The Château des ducs de Bretagne (French pronunciation: [ʃato de dyk də bʁətaɲ], "Castle of the Dukes of Brittany"; Breton: Kastell Duged Breizh) is a large castle located in the city of Nantes in the Loire-Atlantique département of France; it served as the centre of the historical province of Brittany until its separation in 1956. It is located on the right bank of the Loire, which formerly fed its ditches. It was the residence of the Dukes of Brittany between the 13th and 16th centuries, subsequently becoming the Breton residence of the French Monarchy.

The castle has been listed as a monument historique by the French Ministry of Culture since 1840. Today, the castle houses the Nantes History Museum.

== Restoration ==
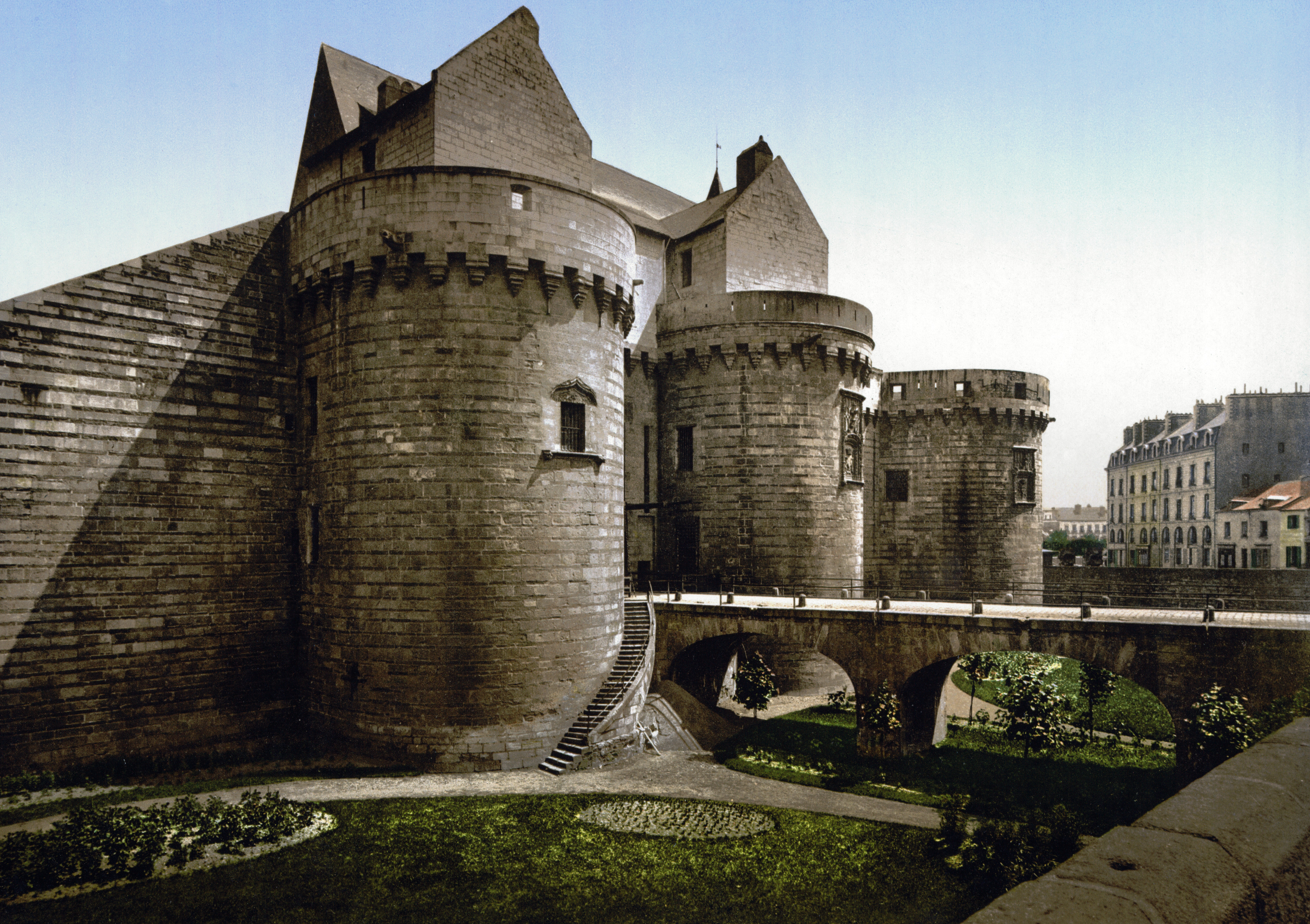
Entrance as it appeared between 1890 and 1905

Starting in the 1990s, the town of Nantes undertook a massive programme of restoration and repairs to return the site to its former glory as an emblem of the history of Nantes and Brittany. Following 15 years of works and three years of closure to the public, it was reopened on 9 February 2007, and is now a popular tourist attraction.

The restored edifice now includes the new Nantes History Museum, installed in 32 of the castle rooms. The museum presents more than 850 objects of collection with the aid of multimedia devices.The castle and the museum try to offer a modern vision of the heritage by presenting the past, the present and the future of the city. Night-time illuminations at the castle further reinforce the revival of the site.

The 500-metre (1,600 ft) round walk on the fortified ramparts provides views not just of the castle buildings and courtyards but also of the town.

=== Seven sequences of the museum ===
- The Castle, Nantes and Brittany through the ages until the 17th century. (Rooms 1 to 7)
- Born of the river and the ocean. (Rooms 8 to 10)
- Transatlantic Slave trade (Rooms 11 to 17)
- Nantes and the Revolution (Room 18)
- An industrial and colonial port 1814–1915 (Rooms 19 to 25)
- At war 1914–1918/1939–1945(Rooms 26 to 29)
- An Atlantic city ? Today and tomorrow. (Rooms 30 to 32)

The exhibition ends with a vision of the city, a multimedia creation by a contemporary artist, occupying the entire area of the 32nd room. Pierrick Sorin is the first guest artist.

=== The illuminated castle ===
The night-lighting brings out the architectural complexity of the site within an urban context. The illumination was designed by Sylvie Sieg and Pierre Nègre of the Atelier Lumière and won the Light Originator Price of the Lumiville Trophy 2007.

== Nantes History Museum in 2020 ==
On 12 October, after being asked by the Chinese regime not to use the words “Genghis Khan” and “Mongolia", Nantes History Museum stopped an exhibition project dedicated to the history of Genghis Khan and the Mongol Empire in partnership with a Chinese museum”. The director of the Nantes museum, Bertrand Guillet, says: “We made the decision to stop this production in the name of the human, scientific and ethical values that we defend in our institution”.

== See also ==
- List of castles in France
- Saint-Pierre gate, Nantes

== Bibliography ==
- Le château des ducs, Nantes et la Bretagne, Guy SAUPIN, 2010.

== Gallery ==
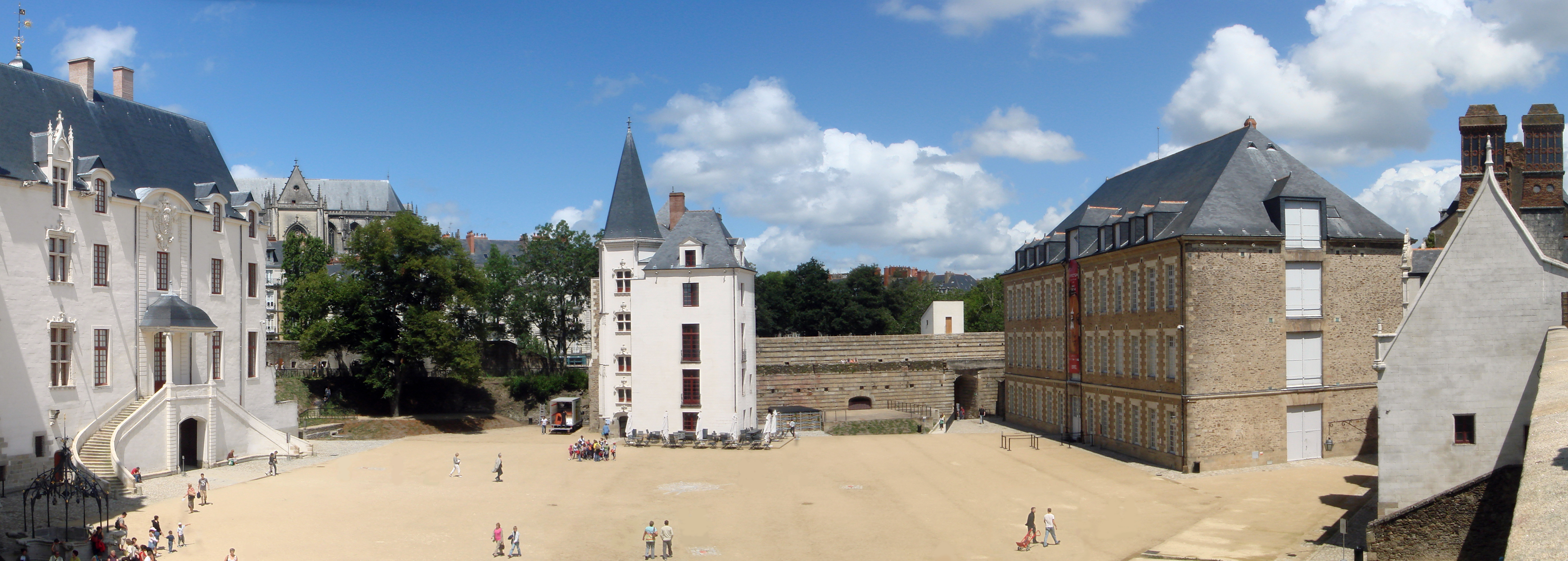
The courtyard of the château, from left to right; le Grand Gouvernement, which served as the residence of the governors of Brittany, otherwise known as le Palais Ducal; La Conciergerie, currently Caretaker's Lodge, but housed first the lieutenant of the duke, then the castle's arsenal of weapons; Le Harnachement, also used to store artillery, now an exhibition centre; Le Petit Gouvernement, the former home of the king of France on his visits to Nantes; and to the side, Les Murailles Extérieures, the walls of the castle. In the left background lies the Cathedral of St. Peter and St. Paul

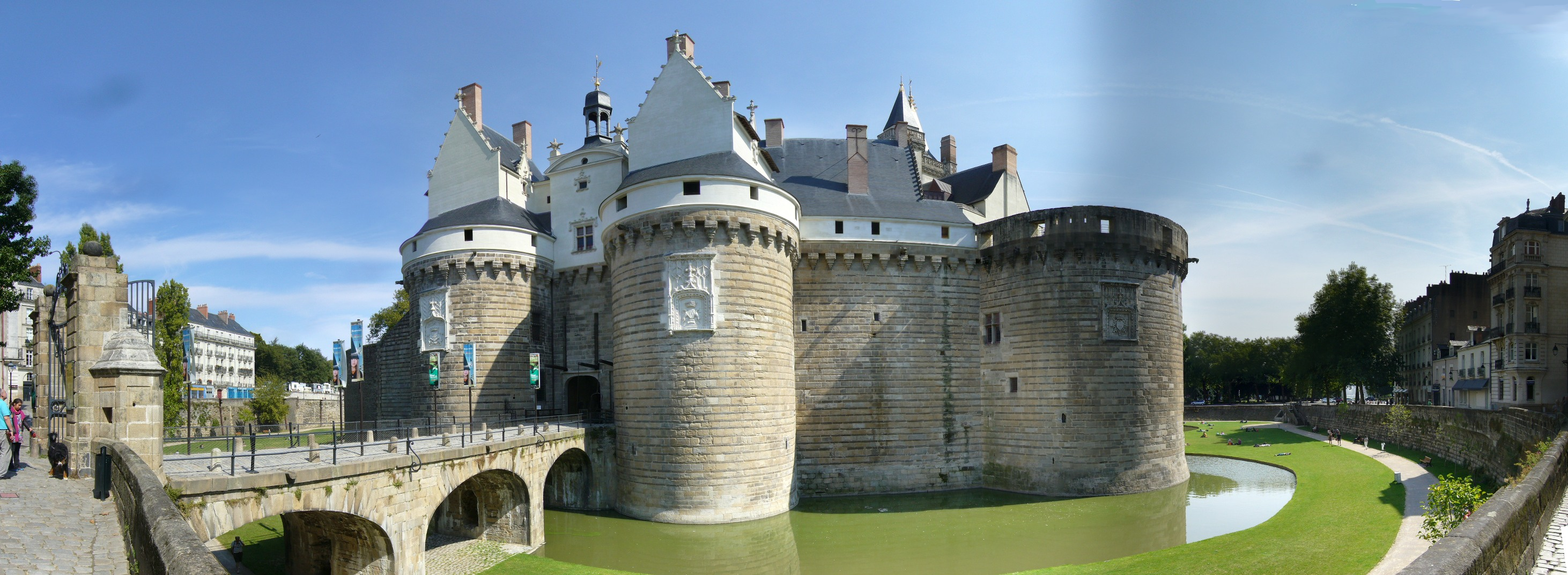
The entrance of the château

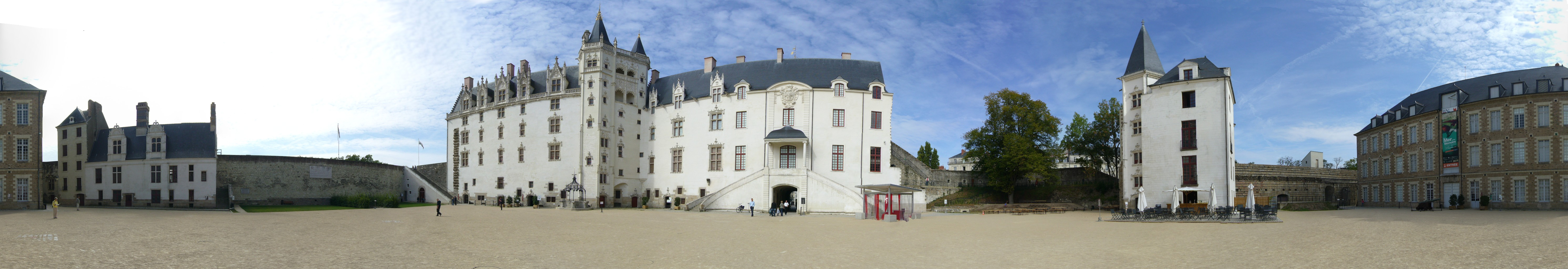
A panoramic view of the courtyard
