= Théâtre Graslin =

Theater in Nantes, France

Coordinates: 47°12′49″N 1°33′44″W

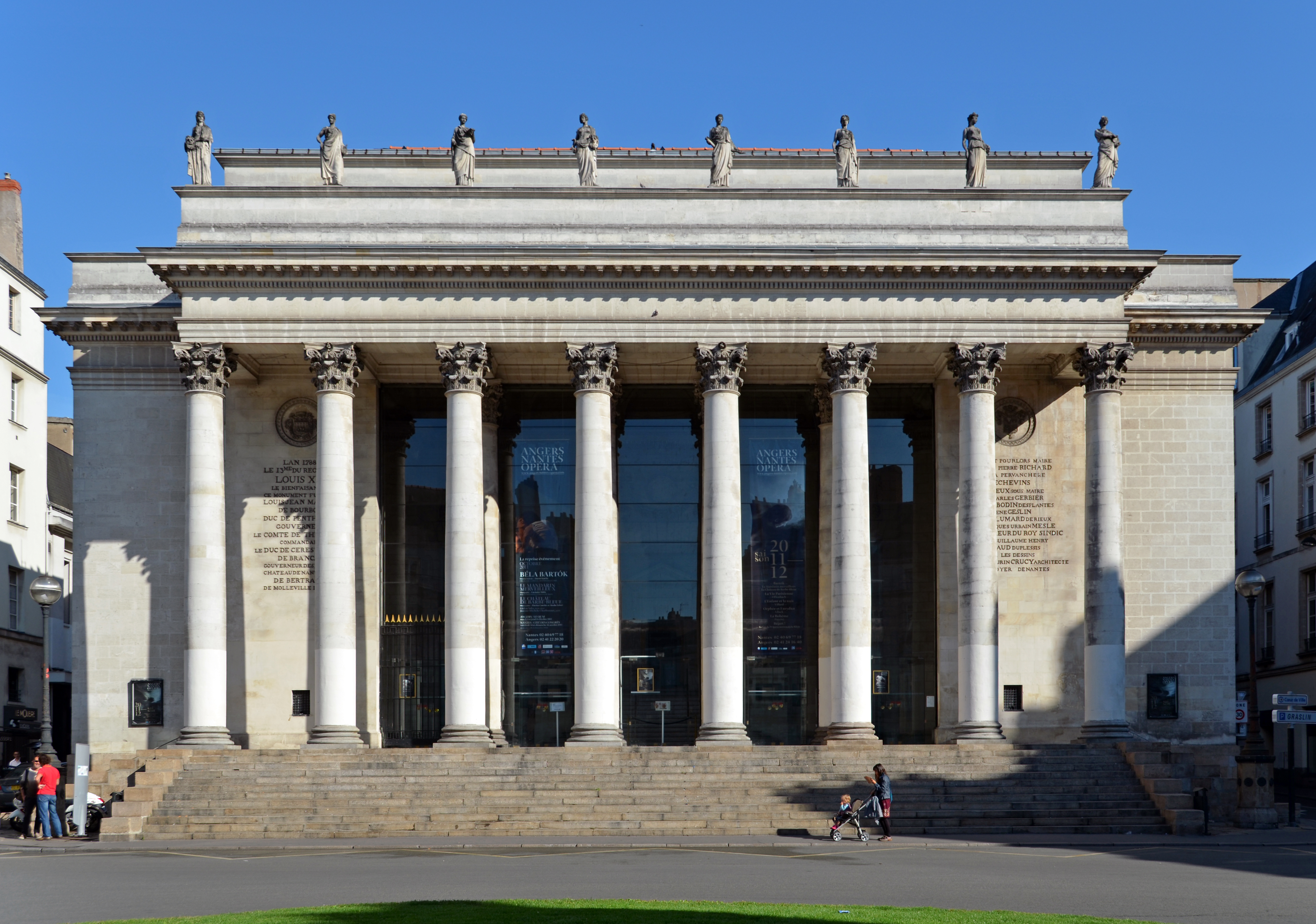
Facade of the Théâtre Graslin

Théâtre Graslin is a theatre and opera house in the city of Nantes, France, built in a new district of the city in the late 18th century by the local architect Mathurin Crucy, and named after the owner of the land, Jean-Louis Graslin. Constructed in the Italian style, the auditorium holds 823 people.

Inaugurated on 23 March 1788, it quickly became a major opera house for the city which nowadays, along with the Grand Théâtre d'Angers, combines with Angers to form a joint Angers-Nantes opera.

Théâtre Graslin was destroyed by fire 1796, but it was reconstructed to coincide with the 1811 visit by Emperor Napoleon. It was restored again in 2003 and continues to be used for opera and other performances.

== See also ==
- List of opera houses
