= 2018–19 PSA World Tour =

Details
- Event name: PSA World Tour 2018–19
- Dates: August 2018 – July 2019
- Tournaments: 164
- Categories: World Championship: Men's/Women's; World Tour Finals: Men's/Women's; PSA Challenger Tour; WSF & PSA Satellite Tour
- Website; PSA World Tour

Achievements
- World Number 1: Men : (Egypt) Ali Farag; Women : (Egypt) Raneem El Welily
- World Champion: Men: (Egypt) Ali Farag; Women: (Egypt) Nour El Sherbini

The 2018–19 PSA World Tour is the international squash tour organised circuit organized by the Professional Squash Association (PSA) for the 2018 squash season. It's the 4th PSA season since the merger of PSA and WSA associations in 2015.

The most important tournaments in the series are the Men's and Women's PSA World Championship. The tour also features two circuits of regular events - PSA World Tour (formerly PSA World Series), which feature the highest prize money and the best fields; and PSA Challenger Tour with prize money ranging $5,500–$30,000. In the middle of the year, the PSA World Tour tour is concluded by the Men's and Women's PSA World Tour Finals in Cairo, the season-ending championships for the top 8 rated players from World Tour level tournaments.

== Overview ==
=== PSA World Tour changes ===
Starting in August 2018, PSA revamped its professional tour structure in two individual circuits; PSA World Tour and PSA Challenger Tour.

PSA World Tour (formerly PSA World Series) will comprise most important tournaments in prize money ($50,000–$1,000,000) for more experienced and higher-ranked players, including PSA World Championships and PSA World Tour Finals, labelled as following:

- PSA World Tour Platinum — 48-player draws — $169,000
- PSA World Tour Gold — 24-player draws — $120,500
- PSA World Tour Silver — 24-player draws — $88,000
- PSA World Tour Bronze — 24-player draws — $51,250

PSA Challenger Tour tournaments will offer a $5,500–$30,000 prize-money, ideal circuit for less-experienced and upcoming players, that will include the following tiers:

- PSA Challenger Tour 30 — $28,000
- PSA Challenger Tour 20 — $18,000
- PSA Challenger Tour 10 — $11,000
- PSA Challenger Tour 5 — $5,500

Further, PSA will implement some rule changes like the removing of qualification rounds among others. Also PSA will grant 7 World Championship wildcards for winners of selected PSA Challenger Tour chosen by PSA. Additionally, PSA and WSF will jointly manage PSA Satellite Tour, a circuit for amateur or junior players who aim to become professionals.

=== Prize money/ranking points breakdown ===
PSA World Tour events also have a separate World Tour ranking. Points for this are calculated on a cumulative basis after each World Tour event. The top eight players at the end of the calendar year are then eligible to play in the PSA World Tour Finals.

Ranking points vary according to tournament tier being awarded as follows:

PSA World Tour			Ranking Points						
Rank	Prize money US$	Ranking Points	Winner	Runner up	3/4	5/8	9/16	17/32	33/48
Platinum	$164,500–$180,500	19188 points	2750	1810	1100	675	410	250	152.5
Gold	$100,000–$120,500	10660 points	1750	1150	700	430	260	160	
Silver	$75,000–$88,000	7470 points	1225	805	490	300	182.5	112.5	
Bronze	$47,500–$55,000	5330 points	875	575	350	215	130	80	
PSA World Tour Finals			Ranking Points						
Rank	Prize money US$	Winner	Runner up	3/4	Round-Robin Match Win	Undefeated bonus			
World Tour Finals	$160,000	1000	550	200	150	150			
PSA Challenger Tour			Ranking Points						
Rank	Prize money US$	Ranking Points	Winner	Runner up	3/4	5/8	9/16	17/32	33/48
Challenger Tour 30	$28,000	3194 points	525	345	210	130	78	47.5	
Challenger Tour 20	$18,000	2112 points	350	230	140	85	51	31.5	
Challenger Tour 10	$11,000	1218 points	200	130	80	50	30	18	
Challenger Tour 5	$5,500	609 points	100	65	40	25	15	9	
PSA World Championships			Ranking Points						
Rank	Prize money US$	Ranking Points	Winner	Runner up	3/4	5/8	9/16	17/32	33/64
PSA World Championships	$500,000	25045 points	3175	2090	1270	780	475	290	177.5

== Calendar ==
=== Key ===
PSA Tiers (until July 2018)
World Championship
World Series
PSA 100
PSA 70
PSA 50
PSA 25/35
PSA 5/10/15

PSA Tiers (starting 1 August 2018)
World Championship
World Tour Platinum
World Tour Gold
World Tour Silver
World Tour Bronze
Challenger Tour 5/10/20/30

=== August ===
Tournament	Date	Champion	Runner-Up	Semifinalists	Quarterfinalists
Australian Open; Melbourne, Australia; Men : PSA Challenger 10; 24 players - $11,000 −−−−−− Women : Challenger 10; 24 players - $11,000	1–5 August	(Australia) Rex Hedrick; 11–4, 12–10, 11–5 (13th PSA title)	(Switzerland) Dimitri Steinmann	(Réunion) Sébastien Bonmalais (Malaysia) Mohd Syafiq Kamal	(Australia) Joshua Larkin (New Zealand) Evan Williams (New Zealand) Luke Jones (Japan) Ryunosuke Tsukue
Australian Open; Melbourne, Australia; Men : PSA Challenger 10; 24 players - $11,000 −−−−−− Women : Challenger 10; 24 players - $11,000	1–5 August	(Malaysia) Low Wee Wern; 11–6, 11–9, 10–12, 11–6 (8th PSA title)	(Egypt) Hana Ramadan	(Malaysia) Rachel Arnold (Hong Kong) Tong Tsz Wing	(Australia) Sarah Cardwell (Australia) Christine Nunn (Hong Kong) Ho Tze-Lok (Malaysia) Ooi Kah Yan
Growthpoint SA Open; Pretoria, South Africa; Men : Challenger 10; 24 players - $11,000 −−−−−− Women : Challenger 5; 16 players - $5,500	6–11 August	(Egypt) Mohamed ElSherbini; 7–11, 11–7, 11–3, 11–8 (7th PSA title)	(Egypt) Mazen Gamal	(France) Baptiste Masotti (Portugal) Rui Soares	(Zimbabwe) Blessing Muhwati (South Africa) Christo Potgieter (Germany) Yannik Omlor (South Africa) Jean-Pierre Brits
Growthpoint SA Open; Pretoria, South Africa; Men : Challenger 10; 24 players - $11,000 −−−−−− Women : Challenger 5; 16 players - $5,500	6–11 August	(Egypt) Farida Mohamed; 11–9, 13–11, 11–4 (1st PSA title)	(Egypt) Menna Nasser	(South Africa) Alexa Pienaar (South Africa) Milnay Louw	(South Africa) Cheyna Tucker (South Africa) Lauren Siddall (South Africa) Jennifer Preece (South Africa) Linda Shannon
Tarra KIA Bega Open; Bega, Australia; Men : Challenger 10; 24 players - $11,000	8–12 August	(Australia) Rex Hedrick; 11–5, 7–11, 11–4, 11–9 (14th PSA title)	(Australia) Joshua Larkin	(Switzerland) Dimitri Steinmann (Australia) Rhys Dowling	(Australia) Alex Eustace (Malaysia) Bryan Lim Tze Kang (New Zealand) Scott Galloway (New Zealand) Luke Jones
Squash Melbourne Open; Melbourne, Australia; Men : Challenger 5; 24 players - $5,500 −−−−−− Women : Challenger 5; 24 players - $5,500	10–12 August	(Réunion) Christophe André; 11–4, 12–10, 11–1 (6th PSA title)	(New Zealand) Evan Williams	(Malaysia) Elvinn Keo (Australia) Nicholas Calvert	(Australia) Thomas Calvert (Malaysia) Ryan Pasqual (New Zealand) Zac Millar (Australia) Tim Cowell
Squash Melbourne Open; Melbourne, Australia; Men : Challenger 5; 24 players - $5,500 −−−−−− Women : Challenger 5; 24 players - $5,500	10–12 August	(Hong Kong) Vanessa Chu; 8–11, 11–9, 11–7, 9–11, 11–5 (6th PSA title)	(Australia) Christine Nunn	(Australia) Sarah Cardwell (Malaysia) Ooi Kah Yan	(Czech Republic) Anna Serme (Australia) Jessica Turnbull (Malaysia) Aika Azman (New Zealand) Casey Jane Owen
City of Greater Shepparton International; Shepparton, Australia; Men : Challenger 5; 24 players - $5,500	23–26 August	(Switzerland) Dimitri Steinmann; 3–11, 11–9, 11–5, 11–7 (3rd PSA title)	(New Zealand) Evan Williams	(Japan) Naoki Hayashi (Switzerland) Robin Gadola	(Malaysia) Asyraf Azan (Australia) Alex Eustace (Australia) Rohan Toole (Egypt) Abdelrahman Abdelkhalek
Prague Open; Prague, Czech Republic; Men : Challenger 5; 24 players - $5,500	27–30 August	(Egypt) Shehab Essam; 11–2, 11–4, 11–3 (4th PSA title)	(Finland) Miko Äijänen	(England) Adam Auckland (Hungary) Balázs Farkas	(Finland) Jami Äijänen (Wales) Owain Taylor (England) Mark Fuller (Republic of Ireland) Brian Byrne
Roberts & Morrow North Coast Open (QE); Coffs Harbour, Australia; Men : Challenger 5; 24 players - $5,500 −−−−−− Women : Challenger 5; 16 players - $5,500	30 Aug.–2 Sep.	(Switzerland) Dimitri Steinmann; 10–12, 11–5, 11–6, 11–2 (4th PSA title)	(New Zealand) Evan Williams	(Australia) Nicholas Calvert (Malaysia) Asyraf Azan	(Australia) Rohan Toole (Australia) Alex Eustace (Japan) Naoki Hayashi (Switzerland) Robin Gadola
Roberts & Morrow North Coast Open (QE); Coffs Harbour, Australia; Men : Challenger 5; 24 players - $5,500 −−−−−− Women : Challenger 5; 16 players - $5,500	30 Aug.–2 Sep.	(Australia) Christine Nunn; 11–9, 11–9, 5–11, 5–11, 11–7 (10th PSA title)	(Australia) Sarah Cardwell	(Australia) Jessica Turnbull (Australia) Tamika Hunt	(Australia) Shehana Vithana (Australia) Selena Shaikh (Australia) Taylor Flavell (Australia) Courtney Mather

(QE): 2019 PSA World Squash Championships Qualifying Event.

=== September ===
Tournament	Date	Champion	Runner-Up	Semifinalists	Quarterfinalists
Open International de Nantes; Nantes, France; Men : Challenger 30; 24 players - $28,000 - Draw −−−−−− Women : Challenger 20; 24 players - $18,000 - Draw	4–9 September	(England) Declan James; 2–11, 11–9, 5–11, 11–9, 11–9 (13th PSA title)	(England) James Willstrop	(Egypt) Zahed Salem (France) Baptiste Masotti	(England) George Parker (Finland) Olli Tuominen (France) Grégoire Marche (France) Lucas Serme
Open International de Nantes; Nantes, France; Men : Challenger 30; 24 players - $28,000 - Draw −−−−−− Women : Challenger 20; 24 players - $18,000 - Draw	4–9 September	(Belgium) Nele Gilis; 4–11, 11–6, 6–11, 12–10, 11–6 (5th PSA title)	(England) Emily Whitlock	(England) Fiona Moverley (England) Lucy Turmel	(England) Julianne Courtice (Egypt) Nadine Shahin (Belgium) Tinne Gilis (South Africa) Alexandra Fuller
J.P. Morgan China Squash Open; Shanghai, China; Men : World Tour Gold; 24 players - $120,500 - Draw −−−−−− Women : World Tour Gold; 24 players - $120,500 - Draw	5–9 September	(Egypt) Mohamed Abouelghar; 11–8, 11–8, 11–8 (9th PSA title)	(New Zealand) Paul Coll	(India) Saurav Ghosal (Germany) Simon Rösner	(France) Grégory Gaultier (Qatar) Abdulla Al-Tamimi (Wales) Joel Makin (Germany) Raphael Kandra
J.P. Morgan China Squash Open; Shanghai, China; Men : World Tour Gold; 24 players - $120,500 - Draw −−−−−− Women : World Tour Gold; 24 players - $120,500 - Draw	5–9 September	(Egypt) Raneem El Weleily; 11–5, 8–11, 11–6, 11–5 (18th PSA title)	(France) Camille Serme	(Egypt) Nour El Sherbini (Egypt) Nour El Tayeb	(Malaysia) Nicol David (England) Sarah-Jane Perry (Egypt) Nouran Gohar (India) Joshna Chinappa
Pharmasyntez Russian Open; Moscow, Russia; Men : Challenger 5; 24 players - $5,500	6–9 September	(Finland) Jami Äijänen; 11–8, 11–7, 10–12, 11–7 (2nd PSA title)	(England) Stuart MacGregor	(Czech Republic) Martin Švec (Iran) Sajad Zareian	(England) Anthony Graham (Finland) Miko Äijänen (Iran) Mohammad Kashani (England) Miles Jenkins
Pakistan Chief of the Air Staff International; Islamabad, Pakistan; Men : Challenger 30; 24 players - $28,000	10–14 September	(Egypt) Youssef Soliman; 11–13, 11–13, 11–7, 11–6, 11–6 (7th PSA title)	(Hong Kong) Leo Au	(Malaysia) Nafiizwan Adnan (Pakistan) Tayyab Aslam	(Pakistan) Asim Khan (Egypt) Omar Abdel Meguid (Egypt) Mazen Gamal (Egypt) Mostafa Asal
Pakistan Women's International Tournament; Islamabad, Pakistan; Women : Challenger 10; 24 players - $11,000	10–14 September	(Egypt) Rowan Elaraby; 11–5, 11–8, 11–7 (6th PSA title)	(Egypt) Nada Abbas	(Hong Kong) Tong Tsz Wing (Egypt) Farida Mohamed	(Egypt) Menna Hamed (Netherlands) Tessa ter Sluis (Pakistan) Madina Zafar (Pakistan) Faiza Zafar
Sportwerk Open; Hamburg, Germany; Men : Challenger 10; 24 players - $11,000	11–15 September	(Egypt) Youssef Ibrahim; 11–9, 11–9, 11–9 (3rd PSA title)	(Spain) Bernat Jaume	(Spain) Edmon López (Belgium) Jan Van Den Herrewegen	(India) Abhay Singh (Republic of Ireland) Brian Byrne (France) Baptiste Masotti (Germany) Valentin Rapp
Remeo Open; Helsinki, Finland; Men : Challenger 10; 24 players - $11,000	12–16 September	(India) Mahesh Mangaonkar; 11–6, 13–15, 14–12, 11–9 (6th PSA title)	(Finland) Olli Tuominen	(England) Charlie Lee (Spain) Iker Pajares	(Portugal) Rui Soares (Finland) Miko Äijänen (Spain) Carlos Cornes (Czech Republic) Martin Švec
Queclink HKFC International; Hong Kong, China; Men : Challenger 30; 24 players - $28,000 - Draw −−−−−− Women : Challenger 30; 24 players - $28,000 - Draw	18–22 September	(Hong Kong) Max Lee; 11–4, 11–5, 11–6 (14th PSA title)	(Hong Kong) Leo Au	(Egypt) Youssef Soliman (Hong Kong) Tsz Fung Yip	(Malaysia) Nafiizwan Adnan (England) George Parker (India) Harinder Pal Sandhu (Wales) Peter Creed
Queclink HKFC International; Hong Kong, China; Men : Challenger 30; 24 players - $28,000 - Draw −−−−−− Women : Challenger 30; 24 players - $28,000 - Draw	18–22 September	(Hong Kong) Annie Au; 11–8, 11–7, 11–6 (15th PSA title)	(Egypt) Hania El Hammamy	(Malaysia) Rachel Arnold (Egypt) Mayar Hany	(Canada) Danielle Letourneau (France) Coline Aumard (New Zealand) Amanda Landers-Murphy (Egypt) Zeina Mickawy
NASH Cup; London, Canada; Men : Challenger 10; 24 players - $12,000	18–22 September	(Mexico) Alfredo Ávila; 8–11, 11–3, 7–11, 12–10, 11–2 (11th PSA title)	(Jamaica) Christopher Binnie	(India) Vikram Malhotra (Egypt) Mostafa Asal	(Mexico) Jesús Camacho (England) Charles Sharpes (Canada) Andrew Schnell (Canada) Shawn Delierre
Beijing Squash Challenge; Beijing, China; Men : Challenger 5; 16 players - $5,500	19–22 September	(Hong Kong) Henry Leung; 11–7, 14–12, 11–7 (1st PSA title)	(Hong Kong) Chi Him Wong	(Egypt) Khaled Labib (Malaysia) Elvinn Keo	(Malaysia) Valentino Bong (India) Sandeep Ramachandran (Canada) Darosham Khan (India) Ravi Dixit
Madeira Island Open (QE); Caniço, Portugal; Men : Challenger 10; 24 players - $11,000	19–23 September	(United States) Todd Harrity; 10–12, 11–5, 11–9, 11–3 (3rd PSA title)	(England) Joshua Masters	(India) Mahesh Mangaonkar (Germany) Valentin Rapp	(Portugal) Cláudio Pinto (Portugal) Rui Soares (India) Abhay Singh (Wales) Emyr Evans
NASH Cup; London, Canada; Women : Challenger 20; 24 players - $18,000	19–23 September	(England) Emily Whitlock; 11–9, 13–11, 11–5 (17th PSA title)	(Canada) Samantha Cornett	(Egypt) Nadine Shahin (Netherlands) Milou van der Heijden	(United States) Haley Mendez (England) Julianne Courtice (French Guiana) Mélissa Alves (United States) Olivia Fiechter
Kiva Club Open; Santa Fe, United States; Men : Challenger 5; 16 players - $5,500	20–23 September	(India) Aditya Jagtap; 11–7, 4–11, 14–12, 11–8 (2nd PSA title)	(United States) Faraz Khan	(Nigeria) Babatunde Ajagbe (Pakistan) Shahjahan Khan	(Spain) Hugo Varela (Mexico) Mario Yáñez (Bermuda) Micah Franklin (Colombia) Edgar Ramírez
Aspin Kemp & Associates Aspin Cup; Charlottetown, Canada; Men : Challenger 10; 24 players - $11,000	25–29 September	(India) Vikram Malhotra; 11–3, 11–9, 9–11, 11–9 (7th PSA title)	(Egypt) Mostafa Asal	(Mexico) Alfredo Ávila (Canada) Cameron Seth	(Canada) Michael McCue (Switzerland) Reiko Peter (Denmark) Kristian Frost (Finland) Henrik Mustonen
Wakefield PSA Open; The Plains, United States; Men : Challenger 5; 16 players - $5,500	25–29 September	(Colombia) Juan Camilo Vargas; 8–11, 11–5, 12–10, 9–11, 11–9 (2nd PSA title)	(Pakistan) Shahjahan Khan	(Jamaica) Christopher Binnie (Mexico) Mario Yáñez	(England) Reuben Phillips (England) Mark Broekman (Argentina) Leandro Romiglio (United States) Dylan Cunningham
Oracle Netsuite Open; San Francisco, United States; Men : World Tour Gold; 24 players - $118,000 - Draw	27 Sep.–2 Oct.	(Egypt) Ali Farag; 11–9, 13–11, 4–11, 11–9 (12th PSA title)	(Egypt) Mohamed El Shorbagy	(France) Grégory Gaultier (Egypt) Karim Abdel Gawad	(Egypt) Tarek Momen (Colombia) Miguel Ángel Rodríguez (Germany) Simon Rösner (Peru) Diego Elías
Oracle Netsuite Open; San Francisco, United States; Women : World Tour Silver; 24 players - $88,000 - Draw	27 Sep.–2 Oct.	(England) Sarah-Jane Perry; 11–9, 11–7, 9–11, 7–11, 11–7 (10th PSA title)	(Egypt) Raneem El Weleily	(England) Laura Massaro (Hong Kong) Annie Au	(France) Camille Serme (Malaysia) Nicol David (New Zealand) Joelle King (England) Alison Waters

(QE): 2019 PSA World Squash Championships Qualifying Event.

=== October ===
Tournament	Date	Champion	Runner-Up	Semifinalists	Quarterfinalists
Texas Open Men's Squash Championships; Houston, United States; Men : Challenger 10; 24 players - $11,000	3–7 October	(India) Vikram Malhotra; 11–6, 2–11, 5–11, 15–13, 11–1 (8th PSA title)	(Czech Republic) Daniel Mekbib	(Pakistan) Shahjahan Khan (Mexico) Jesús Camacho	(England) Reuben Phillips (Spain) Hugo Varela (Mexico) Leonel Cárdenas (India) Ramit Tandon
FMC International Squash Championship; Lahore, Pakistan; Men : Challenger 20; 24 players - $18,000	8–12 October	(Egypt) Youssef Soliman; 8–11, 11–6, 11–8, 9–11, 11–8 (8th PSA title)	(Malaysia) Ivan Yuen	(Pakistan) Tayyab Aslam (Pakistan) Farhan Mehboob	(Pakistan) Asim Khan (France) Auguste Dussourd (Egypt) Mazen Gamal (Pakistan) Israr Ahmed
FS Investments U.S. Open; Philadelphia, United States; Men : World Tour Platinum; 48 players - $169,000 - Draw −−−−−− Women : World Tour Platinum; 48 players - $169,000 - Draw	6–13 October	(Egypt) Mohamed El Shorbagy; 8–11, 11–8, 6–11, 11–8, 11–4 (34th PSA title)	(Germany) Simon Rösner	(New Zealand) Paul Coll (Egypt) Ali Farag	(Egypt) Tarek Momen (France) Grégory Gaultier (Egypt) Mohamed Abouelghar (Colombia) Miguel Ángel Rodríguez
FS Investments U.S. Open; Philadelphia, United States; Men : World Tour Platinum; 48 players - $169,000 - Draw −−−−−− Women : World Tour Platinum; 48 players - $169,000 - Draw	6–13 October	(Egypt) Raneem El Weleily; 11–6, 11–9, 11–8 (19th PSA title)	(Egypt) Nour El Sherbini	(Wales) Tesni Evans (France) Camille Serme	(England) Sarah-Jane Perry (United States) Amanda Sobhy (England) Laura Massaro (Egypt) Yathreb Adel
Big Head Wines White Oaks Court Classic; Niagara-on-the-Lake, Canada; Men : Challenger 5; 16 players - $5,500	10–13 October	(Czech Republic) Daniel Mekbib; 8–11, 11–2, 11–8, 11–6 (2nd PSA title)	(Canada) Shawn Delierre	(Mexico) Mario Yáñez (Canada) Michael McCue	(Canada) Nick Sachvie (Switzerland) Reiko Peter (Canada) Cameron Seth (Canada) Andrew Schnell
Faletti's Hotel Int'l. Championship; Lahore, Pakistan; Men : Challenger 20; 24 players - $18,000 −−−−−− Women : Challenger 5; 16 players - $5,500	13–17 October	(Pakistan) Tayyab Aslam; 9–11, 11–6, 8–11, 11–6, 12–10 (5th PSA title)	(Malaysia) Ivan Yuen	(France) Auguste Dussourd (Egypt) Mazen Gamal	(Egypt) Shehab Essam (Pakistan) Asim Khan (Kuwait) Ammar Al-Tamimi (Pakistan) Farhan Mehboob
Faletti's Hotel Int'l. Championship; Lahore, Pakistan; Men : Challenger 20; 24 players - $18,000 −−−−−− Women : Challenger 5; 16 players - $5,500	13–17 October	(French Guiana) Mélissa Alves; 11–2, 11–7, 5–11, 12–10 (2nd PSA title)	(Egypt) Farida Mohamed	(Egypt) Menna Nasser (Pakistan) Moqaddas Ashraf	(Pakistan) Madina Zafar (Egypt) Farah Momen (Pakistan) Riffat Khan (Iran) A Mousavizadeh
Channel VAS Championships at St George's Hill; Weybridge, England; Men : World Tour Gold; 24 players - $106,000 - Draw	16–21 October	(Egypt) Tarek Momen; 8–11, 11–8, 7–11, 11–5, 11–9 (5th PSA title)	(Egypt) Ali Farag	(Egypt) Karim Abdel Gawad (Peru) Diego Elías	(Wales) Joel Makin (New Zealand) Paul Coll (England) Tom Richards (India) Saurav Ghosal
Walker & Dunlop/Hussain Family Chicago Open; Vernon Hills, United States; Men : Challenger 30; 24 players - $28,000	17–21 October	(Australia) Ryan Cuskelly; 11–5, 11–6, 11–3 (16th PSA title)	(Mexico) César Salazar	(Mexico) Arturo Salazar (Egypt) Mostafa Asal	(France) Baptiste Masotti (Malaysia) Eain Yow (New Zealand) Campbell Grayson (England) Joshua Masters
Cleveland Skating Club Open; Shaker Heights, United States; Men : Challenger 20; 24 players - $18,000	17–21 October	(England) Richie Fallows; 11–3, 11–8, 13–11 (5th PSA title)	(Canada) Shawn Delierre	(Scotland) Alan Clyne (Mexico) Alfredo Ávila	(Egypt) Mohamed ElSherbini (Switzerland) Dimitri Steinmann (Mexico) Jesús Camacho (Spain) Bernat Jaume
Q Open; Gold Coast, Australia; Men : Challenger 5; 24 players - $5,500 −−−−−− Women : Challenger 5; 24 players - $5,500	18–21 October	(Japan) Tomotaka Endo; 11–4, 11–8, 12–10 (1st PSA title)	(Philippines) Robert Andrew Garcia	(New Zealand) Evan Williams (Australia) Eugene Heng	(Australia) Thomas Calvert (France) Enzo Corigliano (Hong Kong) Chris Lo (Australia) Mike Corren
Q Open; Gold Coast, Australia; Men : Challenger 5; 24 players - $5,500 −−−−−− Women : Challenger 5; 24 players - $5,500	18–21 October	(Malaysia) Low Wee Wern; 11–2, 12–10, 14–12 (9th PSA title)	(Australia) Jessica Turnbull	(Malaysia) Ooi Kah Yan (Malaysia) Aika Azman	(Australia) Taylor Flavell (New Zealand) Abbie Palmer (Malta) Colette Sultana (Australia) Selena Shaikh
Carol Weymuller Open; Brooklyn Heights, United States; Women : World Tour Bronze; 24 players - $51,250 - Draw	17–22 October	(Egypt) Nour El Tayeb; 11–8, 10–12, 11–6, 11–8 (7th PSA title)	(England) Sarah-Jane Perry	(Egypt) Salma Hany (England) Alison Waters	(Wales) Tesni Evans (United States) Amanda Sobhy (United States) Olivia Blatchford Clyne (India) Joshna Chinappa
6th Open Provence Chateau-Arnoux; Château-Arnoux, France; Men : Challenger 5; 24 players - $5,500	24–27 October	(Denmark) Kristian Frost; 11–8, 11–6, 11–8 (15th PSA title)	(France) Benjamin Aubert	(England) Tom Walsh (Czech Republic) Daniel Mekbib	(Egypt) Omar Elkattan (Croatia) Martin Kegel (Italy) Oliviero Ventrice (Scotland) Rory Stewart
WLJ Capital Boston Open; Boston, United States; Men : Challenger 10; 24 players - $11,000	24–28 October	(Argentina) Robertino Pezzota; 11–9, 13–11, 11–9 (10th PSA title)	(Mexico) Alfredo Ávila	(Spain) Carlos Cornes (Egypt) Mohamed ElSherbini	(France) Victor Crouin (Mexico) Mario Yáñez (Canada) Shawn Delierre (Jamaica) Christopher Binnie
Pacific Toyota Cairns International; Cairns, Australia; Men : Challenger 5; 24 players - $5,500	25–28 October	(Malaysia) Darren Chan; 11–5, 11–7, 6–11, 11–9 (1st PSA title)	(New Zealand) Evan Williams	(Japan) Tomotaka Endo (Australia) Steven Finitsis	(Malaysia) Asyraf Azan (Japan) Naoki Hayashi (Australia) Mike Corren (Hong Kong) Chris Lo
Qatar Classic; Doha, Qatar; Men : World Tour Platinum; 48 players - $177,750 - Draw	27 Oct.–2 Nov.	(Egypt) Ali Farag; 11–9, 11–7, 11–5 (13th PSA title)	(Germany) Simon Rösner	(Egypt) Tarek Momen (Peru) Diego Elías	(Egypt) Mohamed El Shorbagy (Wales) Joel Makin (New Zealand) Paul Coll (Egypt) Karim Abdel Gawad
CIB Wadi Degla Squash Tournament; Cairo, Egypt; Men : Challenger 10; 24 players - $11,000 −−−−−− Women : Challenger 10; 24 players - $11,000	29 Oct.–2 Nov.	(Egypt) Youssef Ibrahim; 11–5, 11–8, 11–6 (4th PSA title)	(Egypt) Mazen Gamal	(Egypt) Shehab Essam (Egypt) Ahmed Hosny	(Jordan) Mohammad Al-Saraj (France) Benjamin Aubert (Egypt) Omar Elkattan (Germany) Yannik Omlor
CIB Wadi Degla Squash Tournament; Cairo, Egypt; Men : Challenger 10; 24 players - $11,000 −−−−−− Women : Challenger 10; 24 players - $11,000	29 Oct.–2 Nov.	(Egypt) Zeina Mickawy; 12–10, 6–11, 11–8, 11–9 (2nd PSA title)	(Egypt) Nada Abbas	(Egypt) Jana Shiha (Egypt) Menna Nasser	(Egypt) Omneya Abdel Kawy (Latvia) Ineta Mackeviča (India) Sunayna Kuruvilla (Egypt) Salma Youssef
First Block Capital Jericho Open; Vancouver, Canada; Men : Challenger 10; 24 players - $11,000	30 Oct.–3 Nov.	(Finland) Henrik Mustonen; 11–7, 11–6, 11–6 (3rd PSA title)	(Canada) Michael McCue	(England) Charles Sharpes (Mexico) Mario Yáñez	(South Africa) Tristan Eysele (Canada) Nick Sachvie (Canada) Andrew Schnell (Finland) Matias Tuomi

=== November ===
Tournament	Date	Champion	Runner-Up	Semifinalists	Quarterfinalists
JC Women's Open; Ottawa, Canada; Women : Challenger 10; 16 players - $11,000	1–4 November	(Canada) Samantha Cornett; 11–5, 11–7, 11–8 (10th PSA title)	(Canada) Hollie Naughton	(Hong Kong) Ho Tze-Lok (Hong Kong) Vanessa Chu	(England) Lucy Turmel (Hong Kong) Lee Ka Yi (Canada) Nikki Todd (Finland) Emilia Soini
PSA Valencia; Alboraya, Spain; Men : Challenger 10; 24 players - $11,000	6–10 November	(Spain) Edmon López; 11–5, 9–11, 11–9, 11–8 (6th PSA title)	(Jordan) Mohammad Al-Saraj	(England) Joe Green (Czech Republic) Ondřej Uherka	(England) Connor Sheen (Brazil) Vini Rodrigues (Spain) Sergio García (England) Harry Falconer
Kolkata International; Kolkata, India; Men : Challenger 30; 24 players - $28,000 - Draw	7–11 November	(India) Saurav Ghosal; 11–5, 8–11, 11–8, 11–13, 11–5 (9th PSA title)	(Egypt) Zahed Salem	(Spain) Carlos Cornes (United States) Todd Harrity	(Egypt) Karim El Hammamy (Egypt) Youssef Soliman (England) Nathan Lake (India) Harinder Pal Sandhu
Swiss Open; Uster, Switzerland; Men : Challenger 10; 24 players - $11,000	7–11 November	(Egypt) Youssef Ibrahim; 11–5, 10–12, 11–3, 11–9 (5th PSA title)	(Switzerland) Dimitri Steinmann	(Portugal) Rui Soares (Denmark) Kristian Frost	(England) Patrick Rooney (England) Stuart MacGregor (Finland) Jami Äijänen (Czech Republic) Jakub Solnický
APM Kelowna Open; Kelowna, Canada; Men : Challenger 10; 24 players - $11,000	7–11 November	(India) Vikram Malhotra; 11–9, 6–11, 11–7, 11–13, 11–7 (9th PSA title)	(Argentina) Robertino Pezzota	(Argentina) Leandro Romiglio (Canada) Nick Sachvie	(Canada) Shawn Delierre (England) Charles Sharpes (Mexico) Leonel Cárdenas (Finland) Henrik Mustonen
QSF No.1; Doha, Qatar; Men : World Tour Bronze; 24 players - $51,000 - Draw	10–14 November	(England) Daryl Selby; 11–9, 11–6, 11–6 (13th PSA title)	(Egypt) Omar Mosaad	(Scotland) Greg Lobban (England) George Parker	(Qatar) Abdulla Al-Tamimi (Malaysia) Ivan Yuen (England) Joshua Masters (Germany) Raphael Kandra
Simon Warder Memorial (QE); Sarnia, Canada; Men : Challenger 10; 24 players - $11,000 −−−−−− Women : Challenger 10; 24 players - $11,000	12–17 November	(Pakistan) Shahjahan Khan; 6–11, 11–9, 11–3, 3–11, 11–7 (2nd PSA title)	(Finland) Henrik Mustonen	(Mexico) Mario Yáñez (Switzerland) Reiko Peter	(Nigeria) Babatunde Ajagbe (England) Lyell Fuller (Colombia) Juan Camilo Vargas (England) Anthony Graham
Simon Warder Memorial (QE); Sarnia, Canada; Men : Challenger 10; 24 players - $11,000 −−−−−− Women : Challenger 10; 24 players - $11,000	12–17 November	(Canada) Samantha Cornett; 11–5, 11–6, 11–7 (11th PSA title)	(England) Lucy Turmel	(Canada) Nikki Todd (France) Énora Villard	(Colombia) Catalina Peláez (Finland) Emilia Soini (Mexico) Diana García (Czech Republic) Anna Serme
Brussels Open; Brussels, Belgium; Men : Challenger 10; 16 players - $11,000	14–17 November	(India) Mahesh Mangaonkar; 11–6, 6–11, 11–8, 3–11, 13–11 (7th PSA title)	(Belgium) Jan Van Den Herrewegen	(Czech Republic) Martin Švec (Spain) Carlos Cornes	(Jordan) Mohammad Al-Saraj (Denmark) Kristian Frost (Canada) David Baillargeon (Switzerland) Robin Gadola
Open International Niort-Venise Verte; Bessines, France; Men : Challenger 10; 24 players - $11,000	14–18 November	(France) Baptiste Masotti; 11–6, 11–4, 11–8 (3rd PSA title)	(France) Sébastien Bonmalais	(Spain) Edmon López (India) Harinder Pal Sandhu	(India) Abhay Singh (France) Benjamin Aubert (Germany) Valentin Rapp (France) Christophe André
2nd PwC Open (QE); Frick, Switzerland; Women : Challenger 5; 24 players - $5,500	14–18 November	(Egypt) Menna Hamed; 11–8, 5–11, 11–3, 11–7 (4th PSA title)	(England) Lily Taylor	(England) Jasmine Hutton (England) Rachael Chadwick	(Latvia) Ineta Mackeviča (France) Chloé Mesic (Switzerland) Cindy Merlo (Australia) Sarah Cardwell
Saskatoon Movember Boast; Saskatoon, Canada; Men : Challenger 10; 16 players - $11,000	15–18 November	(Switzerland) Dimitri Steinmann; 11–5, 11–6, 11–5 (5th PSA title)	(Canada) Shawn Delierre	(India) Vikram Malhotra (United States) Chris Hanson	(Mexico) Leonel Cárdenas (Canada) Nick Sachvie (Finland) Matias Tuomi (Bermuda) Micah Franklin
Rhode Island Open; Providence, United States; Women : Challenger 5; 16 players - $5,500	15–18 November	(United States) Olivia Fiechter; 11–6, 11–9, 13–11 (1st PSA title)	(Egypt) Menna Nasser	(Canada) Nicole Bunyan (England) Kace Bartley	(England) Lucy Beecroft (England) Alicia Mead (United States) Nessrine Ariffin (England) Charlotte Jagger
Romanian Open (QE); Cluj-Napoca, Romania; Men : Challenger 5; 16 players - $5,500	16–18 November	(Egypt) Youssef Ibrahim; 11–9, 8–11, 11–8, 11–6 (6th PSA title)	(Spain) Bernat Jaume	(Hungary) Balázs Farkas (England) Jaymie Haycocks	(Egypt) Ahmed Hosny (Italy) Oliviero Ventrice (England) Robert Downer (Czech Republic) Jakub Solnický
Czech Open; Prague, Czech Republic; Men : Challenger 5; 24 players - $5,500	20–23 November	(France) Fabien Verseille; 11–1, 11–7, 11–2 (1st PSA title)	(France) Christophe André	(Italy) Yuri Farneti (England) Stuart MacGregor	(Jordan) Mohammad Al-Saraj (Egypt) Tarek Shehata (Canada) David Baillargeon (Israel) Roee Avraham
DHA Cup International Championship; Karachi, Pakistan; Men : Challenger 20; 24 players - $18,000 −−−−−− Women : Challenger 5; 24 players - $5,500	20–24 November	(Malaysia) Ivan Yuen; 11–5, 5–11, 11–3, 15–13 (9th PSA title)	(Pakistan) Tayyab Aslam	(Egypt) Karim Ali Fathy (Egypt) Youssef Ibrahim	(Egypt) Mohammed Reda (Pakistan) Asim Khan (Pakistan) Farhan Mehboob (Malaysia) Addeen Idrakie
DHA Cup International Championship; Karachi, Pakistan; Men : Challenger 20; 24 players - $18,000 −−−−−− Women : Challenger 5; 24 players - $5,500	20–24 November	(Egypt) Farida Mohamed; 11–4, 6–11, 11–4, 11–0 (2nd PSA title)	(Egypt) Amina El Rihany	(Pakistan) Madina Zafar (Malaysia) Ooi Kah Yan	(Pakistan) Saima Shoukat (Egypt) Farah Momen (Pakistan) Riffat Khan (Pakistan) Amna Fayyaz
Aston & Fincher Sutton Coldfield International; Sutton Coldfield, England; Men : Challenger 5; 24 players - $5,500	20–24 November	(France) Victor Crouin; 11–4, 11–6, 11–8 (4th PSA title)	(India) Abhay Singh	(Belgium) Jan Van Den Herrewegen (England) Patrick Rooney	(England) Jaymie Haycocks (England) Nick Mulvey (Scotland) Rory Stewart (England) Harry Falconer
Everbright Sun Hung Kai Hong Kong Open; Hong Kong, China; Men : World Tour Platinum; 48 players - $164,500 - Draw −−−−−− Women : World Tour Platinum; 48 players - $164,500 - Draw	19–25 November	(Egypt) Mohamed El Shorbagy; 11–6, 11–7, 11–7 (35th PSA title)	(Egypt) Ali Farag	(Germany) Simon Rösner (Egypt) Tarek Momen	(Colombia) Miguel Ángel Rodríguez (Egypt) Mohamed Abouelghar (Egypt) Karim Abdel Gawad (New Zealand) Paul Coll
Everbright Sun Hung Kai Hong Kong Open; Hong Kong, China; Men : World Tour Platinum; 48 players - $164,500 - Draw −−−−−− Women : World Tour Platinum; 48 players - $164,500 - Draw	19–25 November	(New Zealand) Joelle King; 11–4, 12–10, 19–17 (12th PSA title)	(Egypt) Raneem El Weleily	(Egypt) Nouran Gohar (England) Sarah-Jane Perry	(Egypt) Nour El Sherbini (France) Camille Serme (Egypt) Nour El Tayeb (Hong Kong) Joey Chan
Airport Squash & Fitness Xmas Challenger; Berlin, Germany; Men : Challenger 5; 24 players - $5,500	21–25 November	(Hungary) Balázs Farkas; 8–11, 13–11, 11–9, 11–6 (1st PSA title)	(Spain) Carlos Cornes	(Canada) Michael McCue (Finland) Jami Äijänen	(India) Sandeep Ramachandran (France) Benjamin Aubert (Israel) Daniel Poleshchuk (Finland) Miko Äijänen
Singapore Open; Singapore; Men : WSF/PSA Satellite; 24 players - $4,900 −−−−−− Women : Challenger 5; 24 players - $5,500	27 Nov.–1 Dec.	(Taiwan) James Huang; 11–8, 7–11, 11–5, 12–10	(Philippines) Robert Andrew Garcia	(Malaysia) Asyraf Azan (Malaysia) Addeen Idrakie	(Malaysia) Ng Jo Wen (Singapore) Chua Man Tong (Singapore) Samuel Kang (Malaysia) Muhammad Ampandi
Singapore Open; Singapore; Men : WSF/PSA Satellite; 24 players - $4,900 −−−−−− Women : Challenger 5; 24 players - $5,500	27 Nov.–1 Dec.	(Malaysia) Low Wee Wern; 11–6, 11–5, 11–3 (10th PSA title)	(Hong Kong) Lee Ka Yi	(India) Sunayna Kuruvilla (India) Tanvi Khanna	(Philippines) Jemyca Aribado (Malaysia) Jessica Keng (Singapore) Sneha Sivakumar (Malaysia) Angie Ooi
Tournoi Féminin Val de Marne (QE); Créteil, France; Women : Challenger 5; 24 players - $5,500	28 Nov.–1 Dec.	(France) Mélissa Alves; 11–7, 11–7, 11–4 (3rd PSA title)	(England) Grace Gear	(Egypt) Jana Shiha (England) Rachael Chadwick	(Scotland) Georgia Adderley (Egypt) Menna Hamed (Czech Republic) Anna Serme (England) Kace Bartley
Golootlo Pakistan Men's Open; Karachi, Pakistan; Men : World Tour Bronze; 24 players - $53,000 - Draw	28 Nov.–2 Dec.	(Egypt) Karim Abdel Gawad; 11–4, 11–2, 11–8 (19th PSA title)	(Peru) Diego Elías	(Malaysia) Nafiizwan Adnan (Mexico) Arturo Salazar	(Malaysia) Ivan Yuen (Egypt) Karim El Hammamy (Egypt) Mazen Gamal (Egypt) Mostafa Asal
Golootlo Pakistan Women's Open; Karachi, Pakistan; Women : Challenger 20; 24 players - $18,000	28 Nov.–2 Dec.	(Egypt) Yathreb Adel; 11–5, 11–9, 11–8 (9th PSA title)	(Egypt) Nadine Shahin	(Egypt) Zeina Mickawy (Malaysia) Sivasangari Subramaniam	(Hong Kong) Liu Tsz Ling (Malaysia) Rachel Arnold (France) Énora Villard (Japan) Satomi Watanabe

(QE): 2019 PSA World Squash Championships Qualifying Event.

=== December ===
Tournament	Date	Champion	Runner-Up	Semifinalists	Quarterfinalists
Monte Carlo Classic; Monte Carlo, Monaco; Women : Challenger 20; 24 players - $18,000	3–7 December	(England) Laura Massaro; 11–9, 11–13, 11–9, 7–11, 11–3 (23rd PSA title)	(Wales) Tesni Evans	(England) Millie Tomlinson (Egypt) Mayar Hany	(Canada) Samantha Cornett (France) Mélissa Alves (England) Julianne Courtice (United States) Olivia Fiechter
Securian Open; St. Paul, United States; Men : Challenger 10; 16 players - $11,000	5–8 December	(United States) Chris Hanson; 11–6, 11–6, 11–6 (5th PSA title)	(United States) Christopher Gordon	(England) Lyell Fuller (Canada) Michael McCue	(Colombia) Juan Camilo Vargas (United States) Andrew Douglas (Canada) David Baillargeon (Canada) Andrew Schnell
OceanBlue Log. Grimsby & Cleethorpes Open; Grimsby, England; Men : Challenger 5; 24 players - $5,500	5–8 December	(England) Jaymie Haycocks; 11–6, 7–11, 11–9, 11–4 (5th PSA title)	(England) Nick Wall	(Wales) Emyr Evans (Wales) Owain Taylor	(England) Mark Fuller (England) Mike Harris (England) Tom Walsh (England) Harry Falconer
CIB Black Ball Squash Open; New Cairo, Egypt; Men : World Tour Platinum; 48 players - $180,500 - Draw	3–9 December	(Egypt) Karim Abdel Gawad; 11–6, 13–11, 7–11, 11–8 (20th PSA title)	(Egypt) Ali Farag	(Egypt) Tarek Momen (New Zealand) Paul Coll	(Egypt) Mohamed Abouelghar (Germany) Simon Rösner (Egypt) Mohamed El Shorbagy (India) Saurav Ghosal
Betty Griffin Memorial Florida Open; Boca Raton, United States; Men : Challenger 10; 24 players - $11,000	5–9 December	(Spain) Iker Pajares; 11–3, 8–11, 12–10, 11–8 (8th PSA title)	(England) Richie Fallows	(France) Victor Crouin (Guatemala) Josué Enríquez	(England) Alex Ingham (Colombia) Ronald Palomino (United States) Spencer Lovejoy (India) Aditya Jagtap
IMET PSA Open; Bratislava, Slovakia; Men : Challenger 5; 24 players - $5,500	6–9 December	(Hungary) Balázs Farkas; 11–5, 11–6, 12–10 (2nd PSA title)	(Switzerland) Reiko Peter	(France) Enzo Corigliano (Italy) Oliviero Ventrice	(Switzerland) Robin Gadola (Spain) Carlos Cornes (Italy) Yuri Farneti (England) Stuart MacGregor
13th CNS International Squash Tournament; Karachi, Pakistan; Men : Challenger 20; 24 players - $18,000	6–10 December	(Egypt) Youssef Ibrahim; 11–7, 12–10, 11–8 (7th PSA title)	(Pakistan) Farhan Mehboob	(Pakistan) Asim Khan (Pakistan) Shahjahan Khan	(Portugal) Rui Soares (Mexico) Arturo Salazar (Kuwait) Ammar Al-Tamimi (Hong Kong) Alex Lau
London Open; London, England; Men : Challenger 20; 24 players - $18,000 −−−−−− Women : Challenger 10; 24 players - $11,000	12–16 December	(England) James Willstrop; 11–9, 11–7, 11–7 (20th PSA title)	(Egypt) Zahed Salem	(Denmark) Kristian Frost (England) Chris Simpson	(India) Abhay Singh (India) Ramit Tandon (England) Patrick Rooney (France) Benjamin Aubert
London Open; London, England; Men : Challenger 20; 24 players - $18,000 −−−−−− Women : Challenger 10; 24 players - $11,000	12–16 December	(England) Fiona Moverley; 9–11, 19–17, 11–9, 13–11 (8th PSA title)	(United States) Sabrina Sobhy	(England) Lucy Turmel (Egypt) Hana Ramadan	(Latvia) Ineta Mackeviča (United States) Olivia Fiechter (England) Rachael Chadwick (Canada) Nicole Bunyan
Internazionali d'Italia; Riccione, Italy; Men : Challenger 5; 24 players - $5,500 −−−−−− Women : Challenger 5; 24 players - $5,500	12–16 December	(Hong Kong) Henry Leung; 9–11, 11–6, 11–7, 11–5 (2nd PSA title)	(Kuwait) Ammar Al-Tamimi	(Hong Kong) Alex Lau (Colombia) Juan Camilo Vargas	(Finland) Miko Äijänen (Hong Kong) Tang Ming Hong (Germany) Valentin Rapp (Italy) Muhammad Bilal
Internazionali d'Italia; Riccione, Italy; Men : Challenger 5; 24 players - $5,500 −−−−−− Women : Challenger 5; 24 players - $5,500	12–16 December	(Scotland) Lisa Aitken; 11–3, 12–14, 11–5, 13–11 (4th PSA title)	(Switzerland) Cindy Merlo	(Netherlands) Tessa ter Sluis (England) Kace Bartley	(France) Chloé Mesic (England) Jasmine Hutton (Italy) Monica Menegozzi (Italy) Cristina Tartarone
Remeo Ladies Open; Helsinki, Finland; Women : Challenger 5; 24 players - $5,500	17–21 December	(Scotland) Lisa Aitken; 11–7, 11–7, 14–12 (5th PSA title)	(United States) Olivia Fiechter	(Latvia) Ineta Mackeviča (England) Grace Gear	(Finland) Emilia Soini (England) Lily Taylor (France) Chloé Mesic (Spain) Cristina Gómez

=== January ===
Tournament	Date	Champion	Runner-Up	Semifinalists	Quarterfinalists
Bourbon Trail Event No1; Chattanooga, United States; Men : Challenger 5; 16 players - $5,500	3–5 January	(United States) Faraz Khan; 8–11, 11–6, 7–11, 11–3, 13–11 (1st PSA title)	(United States) Cole Becker	(United States) Spencer Lovejoy (Pakistan) Syed Bukhari	(England) Lewis Doughty (Colombia) Edgar Ramírez (Canada) Cory McCartney (Pakistan) Kashif Asif
CCI International; Mumbai, India; Men : World Tour Silver; 24 players - $77,800 - Draw	8–12 January	(Egypt) Tarek Momen; 11–7, 7–11, 12–10, 10–12, 11–7 (6th PSA title)	(Egypt) Fares Dessouky	(England) James Willstrop (India) Ramit Tandon	(India) Mahesh Mangaonkar (Spain) Iker Pajares (Egypt) Karim El Hammamy (India) Saurav Ghosal
Contrex Challenge Cup; Hong Kong, China; Men : Challenger 5; 24 players - $5,500 −−−−−− Women : Challenger 5; 16 players - $5,500	9–12 January	(Hong Kong) Henry Leung; 11–6, 11–6, 12–10 (3rd PSA title)	(Hong Kong) Chi Him Wong	(Malaysia) Addeen Idrakie (Malaysia) Mohd Syafiq Kamal	(Egypt) Moustafa El Sirty (Hong Kong) Alex Lau (Malaysia) Elvinn Keo (Hong Kong) Matthew Lai
Contrex Challenge Cup; Hong Kong, China; Men : Challenger 5; 24 players - $5,500 −−−−−− Women : Challenger 5; 16 players - $5,500	9–12 January	(France) Mélissa Alves; 11–4, 15–13, 8–11, 4–11, 12–10 (4th PSA title)	(Hong Kong) Lee Ka Yi	(Hong Kong) Vanessa Chu (India) Sunayna Kuruvilla	(Hong Kong) Cheng Nga Ching (Hong Kong) Kirstie Wong (Hong Kong) Renee Wu Wing (Malaysia) Angie Ooi
Select Gaming/The Colin Payne Kent Open; Tunbridge Wells, England; Men : Challenger 5; 16 players - $5,500	10–12 January	(Belgium) Jan Van Den Herrewegen; 9–11, 11–9, 11–4, 9–11, 11–5 (5th PSA title)	(Portugal) Rui Soares	(Mexico) Leonel Cárdenas (England) Stuart MacGregor	(England) Nick Wall (England) Connor Sheen (England) Ben Coates (England) Miles Jenkins
J.P. Morgan Tournament of Champions; New York City, United States; Men : World Tour Platinum; 48 players - $180,000 - Draw −−−−−− Women : World Tour Platinum; 48 players - $180,000 - Draw	16–24 January	(Egypt) Ali Farag; 10–12, 6–11, 11–6, 11–3, 11–8 (14th PSA title)	(Egypt) Mohamed El Shorbagy	(Egypt) Karim Abdel Gawad (Egypt) Tarek Momen	(Peru) Diego Elías (New Zealand) Paul Coll (Egypt) Omar Mosaad (Germany) Simon Rösner
J.P. Morgan Tournament of Champions; New York City, United States; Men : World Tour Platinum; 48 players - $180,000 - Draw −−−−−− Women : World Tour Platinum; 48 players - $180,000 - Draw	16–24 January	(Egypt) Nour El Sherbini; 11–9, 11–8, 11–8 (18th PSA title)	(Egypt) Raneem El Weleily	(Egypt) Nour El Tayeb (New Zealand) Joelle King	(France) Camille Serme (Egypt) Nouran Gohar (Egypt) Salma Hany (England) Alison Waters
Bourbon Trail Event No2; Chattanooga, United States; Men : Challenger 5; 16 players - $5,500	23–26 January	(India) Aditya Jagtap; 12–10, 4–11, 7–11, 11–8, 11–6 (3rd PSA title)	(Canada) Andrew Schnell	(England) Reuben Phillips (United States) Faraz Khan	(Pakistan) Syed Bukhari (England) Alex Ingham (England) Mark Fuller (Colombia) Edgar Ramírez
CSC Delaware Open; Greenville, United States; Women : Challenger 10; 16 players - $11,000	24–27 January	(Scotland) Lisa Aitken; 8–11, 6–11, 11–9, 11–3, 11–5 (6th PSA title)	(Hong Kong) Liu Tsz Ling	(Canada) Samantha Cornett (Egypt) Hana Moataz	(Switzerland) Cindy Merlo (United States) Olivia Fiechter (Finland) Emilia Soini (England) Lucy Beecroft
Suburban Collection Motor City Open; Detroit, United States; Men : World Tour Silver; 24 players - $75,000 - Draw	29 Jan.–2 Feb.	(Egypt) Mohamed Abouelghar; 5–11, 11–6, 11–3, 4–11, 11–8 (10th PSA title)	(Peru) Diego Elías	(Egypt) Zahed Salem (Egypt) Marwan El Shorbagy	(England) Adrian Waller (Colombia) Miguel Ángel Rodríguez (Egypt) Omar Mosaad (Australia) Ryan Cuskelly
Odense Open; Odense, Denmark; Men : Challenger 5; 24 players - $5,500	29 Jan.–2 Feb.	(France) Benjamin Aubert; 11–7, 8–11, 12–10, 11–2 (3rd PSA title)	(Denmark) Kristian Frost	(Republic of Ireland) Brian Byrne (Denmark) Rasmus Nielsen	(England) Tom Walsh (England) James Peach (France) Fabien Verseille (Egypt) Khaled Labib
Seattle Open; Seattle, United States; Men : Challenger 10; 16 players - $11,000	30 Jan.–2 Feb.	(India) Ramit Tandon; 11–4, 11–7, 2–11, 11–2 (4th PSA title)	(Egypt) Mohamed ElSherbini	(Canada) Andrew Schnell (England) Lyell Fuller	(Czech Republic) Daniel Mekbib (Finland) Matias Tuomi (Canada) Shawn Delierre (France) Sébastien Bonmalais
Edinburgh Sports Club Open; Edinburgh, Scotland; Men : BSPA Open; 16 players - £12,000 −−−−−− Women : Challenger 20; 24 players - $18,000	30 Jan.–3 Feb.	(New Zealand) Paul Coll; 11–8, 11–6, 11–5	(England) James Willstrop	(Scotland) Alan Clyne (England) Daryl Selby	(Scotland) Greg Lobban (England) George Parker (England) Patrick Rooney (Scotland) Rory Stewart
Edinburgh Sports Club Open; Edinburgh, Scotland; Men : BSPA Open; 16 players - £12,000 −−−−−− Women : Challenger 20; 24 players - $18,000	30 Jan.–3 Feb.	(Egypt) Hania El Hammamy; 11–5, 11–5, 11–8 (3rd PSA title)	(United States) Olivia Blatchford Clyne	(England) Rachael Chadwick (South Africa) Alexandra Fuller	(England) Fiona Moverley (France) Énora Villard (United States) Olivia Fiechter (Japan) Satomi Watanabe
Savcor Finnish Open; Mikkeli, Finland; Men : Challenger 5; 24 players - $5,500	30 Jan.–3 Feb.	(Finland) Miko Äijänen; 2–11, 11–8, 11–6, 11–9 (2nd PSA title)	(Pakistan) Ahsan Ayaz	(Italy) Yuri Farneti (Wales) Elliott Morris Devred	(Sweden) Zeeshan Khan (Croatia) Martin Kegel (Spain) Sergio García (Australia) Joseph White
Cleveland Classic; Cleveland, United States; Women : World Tour Bronze; 24 players - $51,250 - Draw	31 Jan.–4 Feb.	(Egypt) Nour El Tayeb; 11–5, 11–7, 9–11, 11–9 (8th PSA title)	(Wales) Tesni Evans	(England) Victoria Lust (England) Alison Waters	(Egypt) Mayar Hany (England) Emily Whitlock (Canada) Hollie Naughton (Egypt) Mariam Metwally

=== February ===
Tournament	Date	Champion	Runner-Up	Semifinalists	Quarterfinalists
Carter & Assante Classic; Toronto, Canada; Men : Challenger 10; 24 players - $11,000	4–8 February	(France) Baptiste Masotti; 11–3, 11–6, 11–8 (4th PSA title)	(Mexico) Mario Yáñez	(Colombia) Juan Camilo Vargas (England) Jaymie Haycocks	(Pakistan) Shahjahan Khan (Finland) Henrik Mustonen (England) Patrick Rooney (Portugal) Rui Soares
Three Rivers Capital Pittsburgh Open; Pittsburgh, United States; Men : World Tour Bronze; 24 players - $52,000	6–10 February	(France) Grégoire Marche; 11–9, 11–6, 10–12, 6–11, 11–5 (8th PSA title)	(Egypt) Zahed Salem	(Switzerland) Nicolas Müller (Mexico) César Salazar	(India) Ramit Tandon (Mexico) Arturo Salazar (Hong Kong) Leo Au (Malaysia) Nafiizwan Adnan
Bahl & Gaynor Cincinnati Cup; Cincinnati, United States; Women : Challenger 30; 24 players - $28,000	6–10 February	(Egypt) Hania El Hammamy; 11–5, 11–8, 11–7 (4th PSA title)	(England) Victoria Lust	(Canada) Samantha Cornett (Canada) Hollie Naughton	(United States) Olivia Blatchford Clyne (Egypt) Nadine Shahin (England) Emily Whitlock (Egypt) Mariam Metwally
Linear Logistics Bankers Hall Pro-Am; Calgary, Canada; Men : Challenger 10; 16 players - $11,000	7–10 February	(Mexico) Leonel Cárdenas; 11–6, 4–11, 11–7, 11–8 (4th PSA title)	(Hong Kong) Alex Lau	(Hong Kong) Henry Leung (Wales) Emyr Evans	(United States) Christopher Gordon (Canada) David Baillargeon (Hong Kong) Chi-Him Wong (Finland) Matias Tuomi
Bourbon Trail Event No3; Louisville, United States; Men : Challenger 5; 16 players - $5,500	13–16 February	(India) Aditya Jagtap; 11–9, 11–9, 13–11 (4th PSA title)	(Italy) Muhammad Bilal	(England) Charlie Cowie (Pakistan) Syed Bukhari	(Colombia) Ronald Palomino (Egypt) Mohamed Nabil (Egypt) Mustafa Nawar (Canada) Cory McCartney
Life Time Atlanta Open; Atlanta, United States; Men : Challenger 10; 24 players - $11,000	13–17 February	(Hong Kong) Henry Leung; 13–11, 9–11, 12–10, 11–5 (4th PSA title)	(Hong Kong) Alex Lau	(Wales) Emyr Evans (Pakistan) Shahjahan Khan	(Spain) Carlos Cornes (Colombia) Juan Camilo Vargas (Czech Republic) Martin Švec (Jamaica) Christopher Binnie
Falcon PSA Squash Cup Open; Minsk, Belarus; Men : Challenger 5; 24 players - $5,500 −−−−−− Women : Women Elite‡ 8 players - $1,000	14–17 February	(Hungary) Balázs Farkas; 11–7, 7–11, 12–10, 11–9 (3rd PSA title)	(Denmark) Kristian Frost	(England) Curtis Malik (Republic of Ireland) Sean Conroy	(Wales) Owain Taylor (Czech Republic) Jakub Solnický (Egypt) Omar Elkattan (Australia) Joseph White
Falcon PSA Squash Cup Open; Minsk, Belarus; Men : Challenger 5; 24 players - $5,500 −−−−−− Women : Women Elite‡ 8 players - $1,000	14–17 February	(Russia) Ekaterina Marusan; 11–7, 5–11, 11–6, 6–11, 11–8	(Russia) Varvara Esina	(Ukraine) Olga Kotova (Belarus) Olga Khmelevskaya	(Russia) Ekaterina Saetgalieva (Belarus) Iryna Kulbatskaya (Latvia) Edite Masalska (Russia) Olesya Strelnikova
AJ Bell British National Championships; Nottingham, England; Men : WSF/PSA National Championships; 16 players - $10,000 −−−−−− Women : WSF/PSA National Championships; 16 players - $10,000	14–17 February	(England) James Willstrop; 11–5, 7–11, 11–5, 11–7 (3rd British National title)	(England) Daryl Selby	(England) Adrian Waller (Scotland) Greg Lobban	(England) Tom Richards (England) Chris Simpson (England) Richie Fallows (England) Nathan Lake
AJ Bell British National Championships; Nottingham, England; Men : WSF/PSA National Championships; 16 players - $10,000 −−−−−− Women : WSF/PSA National Championships; 16 players - $10,000	14–17 February	(Wales) Tesni Evans; 11–3, 11–6, 11–5 (2nd British National title)	(England) Emily Whitlock	(England) Laura Massaro (England) Alison Waters	(England) Kace Bartley (England) Julianne Courtice (England) Fiona Moverley (England) Millie Tomlinson
EM Noll Classic (QE); Philadelphia, United States; Men : Challenger 10; 16 players - $11,000 −−−−−− Women : Challenger 10; 16 players - $11,000	15–18 February	(Egypt) Youssef Ibrahim; 8-11, 11–5, 2–0, ret. (8th PSA title)	(India) Ramit Tandon	(Egypt) Shehab Essam (United States) Chris Hanson	(England) Jaymie Haycocks (Wales) Peter Creed (United States) Christopher Gordon (Spain) Bernat Jaume
EM Noll Classic (QE); Philadelphia, United States; Men : Challenger 10; 16 players - $11,000 −−−−−− Women : Challenger 10; 16 players - $11,000	15–18 February	(United States) Sabrina Sobhy; 11-2, 11–3, 11–4 (2nd PSA title)	(Egypt) Menna Nasser	(Colombia) Catalina Peláez (England) Rachael Chadwick	(England) Anna Kimberley (Egypt) Hana Moataz (Egypt) Menna Hamed (India) Sunayna Kuruvilla
Guilfoyle PSA Squash Classic; Toronto, Canada; Men : Challenger 5; 24 players - $5,500	19–23 February	(Canada) David Baillargeon; 8–11, 12–10, 11–5, 11–9 (1st PSA title)	(England) Jaymie Haycocks	(Switzerland) Reiko Peter (Japan) Tomotaka Endo	(Malaysia) Asyraf Azan (Canada) Graeme Schnell (Canada) Nick Sachvie (Argentina) Leandro Romiglio
Mount Royal University Open; Calgary, Canada; Men : Challenger 5; 24 players - $5,500	21–24 February	(Mexico) Jesús Camacho; 11–9, 11–5, 11–2 (5th PSA title)	(South Africa) Tristan Eysele	(England) Lyell Fuller (Canada) Andrew Schnell	(Mexico) Allan Núñez (England) Mark Broekman (Canada) Connor Turk (Pakistan) Noman Khan
PSA World Championships pres. by Walter Family; Chicago, United States; Men : World Championship; 64 players - $500,000 - Draw −−−−−− Women : World Championship; 64 players - $500,000 - Draw	23 Feb.–2 Mar.	(Egypt) Ali Farag; 11–5, 11–13, 13–11, 11–3 (1st World Championship title) (15th PSA title)	(Egypt) Tarek Momen	(Egypt) Mohamed El Shorbagy (Germany) Simon Rösner	(Colombia) Miguel Ángel Rodríguez (New Zealand) Paul Coll (India) Saurav Ghosal (Egypt) Marwan El Shorbagy
PSA World Championships pres. by Walter Family; Chicago, United States; Men : World Championship; 64 players - $500,000 - Draw −−−−−− Women : World Championship; 64 players - $500,000 - Draw	23 Feb.–2 Mar.	(Egypt) Nour El Sherbini; 11–6, 11–5, 10–12, 15–13 (3rd World Championship title) (19th PSA title)	(Egypt) Nour El Tayeb	(Egypt) Raneem El Weleily (France) Camille Serme	(Egypt) Nouran Gohar (New Zealand) Joelle King (Wales) Tesni Evans (Hong Kong) Annie Au
Hampshire Open; Eastleigh, England; Men : Challenger 5; 16 players - $5,500	28 Feb.–3 Mar.	(Portugal) Rui Soares; 9–11, 11–6, 9–11, 11–8, 11–8 (1st PSA title)	(England) Robert Downer	(Jordan) Mohammad Al-Saraj (Pakistan) Amaad Fareed	(Hungary) Balázs Farkas (Brazil) Diego Gobbi (England) Mark Fuller (Switzerland) Robin Gadola

(QE): 2019 PSA World Squash Championships Qualifying Event.

‡: Not a PSA World Tour tournament.

=== March ===
Tournament	Date	Champion	Runner-Up	Semifinalists	Quarterfinalists
Troilus Canada Cup; Toronto, Canada; Men : World Tour Silver; 24 players - $81,500	3–7 March	(Peru) Diego Elías; 11–8, 6–11, 11–8, 8–11, 11–7 (5th PSA title)	(New Zealand) Paul Coll	(Egypt) Mohamed Abouelghar (Egypt) Marwan El Shorbagy	(Australia) Ryan Cuskelly (Hong Kong) Tsz Fung Yip (England) Tom Richard (England) Declan James
Bermuda Open; Devonshire, Bermuda; Men : Challenger 5; 16 players - $5,500 −−−−−− Women : Challenger 5; 16 players - $5,500	5–8 March	(Canada) Nick Sachvie; 11–7, 11–6, 11–9 (4th PSA title)	(England) Jaymie Haycocks	(Jamaica) Christopher Binnie (England) Lyell Fuller	(Bermuda) Noah Browne (Argentina) Leandro Romiglio (Bermuda) Micah Franklin (Canada) Andrew Schnell
Bermuda Open; Devonshire, Bermuda; Men : Challenger 5; 16 players - $5,500 −−−−−− Women : Challenger 5; 16 players - $5,500	5–8 March	(United States) Marina Stefanoni; 11–8, 11–8, 12–10 (1st PSA title)	(England) Anna Kimberley	(Malaysia) Nessrine Ariffin (Colombia) Catalina Peláez	(France) Julia Le Coq (Canada) Nicole Bunyan (Spain) Marina de Juan (Guyana) Mary Fung-A-Fat
Perrier Challenge Cup; Hong Kong, China; Men : Challenger 5; 24 players - $5,500	6–9 March	(Hong Kong) Alex Lau; 11–9, 11–9, 11–7 (4th PSA title)	(Hong Kong) Wong Chi Him	(Hong Kong) Henry Leung (Hong Kong) Tang Ming Hong	(Japan) Naoki Hayashi (Malaysia) Ong Sai Hung (Malaysia) Elvinn Keo (Hong Kong) Chung Yat Long
CFO Consulting Women's Squash Week; Calgary, Canada; Women : Challenger 20; 24 players - $18,000	6–10 March	(United States) Olivia Blatchford Clyne; 8–11, 11–6, 11–3, 11–5 (6th PSA title)	(Egypt) Nada Abbas	(England) Lucy Turmel (United States) Olivia Fiechter	(Australia) Rachael Grinham (Canada) Danielle Letourneau (Spain) Cristina Gómez (Australia) Sarah Cardwell
Citigold Wealth Management Canary Wharf Classic; London, England; Men : World Tour Gold; 24 players - $109,000	10–15 March	(New Zealand) Paul Coll; 11–8, 12–10, 11–3 (13th PSA title)	(Egypt) Tarek Momen	(Egypt) Mohamed El Shorbagy (France) Mathieu Castagnet	(Australia) Ryan Cuskelly (Egypt) Fares Dessouky (Wales) Joel Makin (England) Declan James
CIB Black Ball Squash Open; New Cairo, Egypt; Women : World Tour Gold; 24 players - $107,000	11–15 March	(Egypt) Raneem El Weleily; 9–11, 11–2, 6–11, 11–1, 11–5 (20th PSA title)	(Egypt) Nour El Sherbini	(Egypt) Nouran Gohar (New Zealand) Joelle King	(France) Camille Serme (India) Joshna Chinappa (Egypt) Hania El Hammamy (England) Laura Massaro
Qualico Manitoba Open; Winnipeg, Canada; Men : Challenger 20; 24 players - $18,000	13–17 March	(Egypt) Mohamed ElSherbini; 17–15, 9–11, 8–7 ret. (8th PSA title)	(Egypt) Omar Abdel Meguid	(France) Baptiste Masotti (Pakistan) Shahjahan Khan	(Canada) Shawn Delierre (Mexico) Alfredo Ávila (India) Ramit Tandon (France) Auguste Dussourd
Queen City Open; Regina, Canada; Women : Challenger 20; 24 players - $18,000	13–17 March	(United States) Reeham Sedky; 11–4, 11–4, 11–6 (2nd PSA title)	(United States) Sabrina Sobhy	(England) Emily Whitlock (Canada) Samantha Cornett	(Finland) Emilia Soini (Colombia) Catalina Peláez (Spain) Cristina Gómez (England) Lucy Turmel
Annecy Rose Open; Seynod, France; Women : Challenger 10; 24 players - $11,000	13–17 March	(Netherlands) Milou van der Heijden; 10–12, 11–7, 11–7, 2–11, 11–8 (7th PSA title)	(France) Coline Aumard	(England) Rachael Chadwick (France) Mélissa Alves	(Egypt) Farida Mohamed (France) Énora Villard (South Africa) Milnay Louw (Egypt) Jana Shiha
Subbotnik PSA Open; Moscow, Russia; Men : Challenger 10; 16 players - $11,000	15–18 March	(Finland) Olli Tuominen; 11–6, 11–5, 11–8 (15th PSA title)	(Hungary) Balázs Farkas	(Finland) Miko Äijänen (France) Benjamin Aubert	(Spain) Iker Pajares (Kuwait) Ammar Al-Tamimi (Belgium) Jan Van Den Herrewegen (Colombia) Juan Camilo Vargas
Crawford Fund Management Open; Boston, United States; Men : Challenger 10; 24 players - $11,000	20–24 March	(France) Baptiste Masotti; 12–10, 11–13, 11–6, 12–10 (5th PSA title)	(New Zealand) Campbell Grayson	(Mexico) Jesús Camacho (Spain) Carlos Cornes	(France) Victor Crouin (Mexico) Mario Yáñez (Hong Kong) Alex Lau (India) Aditya Jagtap
Cronimet Swedish Squash Open; Skellefteå, Sweden; Men : Challenger 5; 24 players - $5,500 −−−−−− Women : Challenger 5; 24 players - $5,500	20–24 March	(Finland) Miko Äijänen; 11–9, 11–6, 8–11, 11–3 (3rd PSA title)	(France) Benjamin Aubert	(Switzerland) Reiko Peter (France) Fabien Verseille	(Brazil) Vini Rodrigues (Scotland) Rory Stewart (Jordan) Mohammad Al-Saraj (England) Stuart MacGregor
Cronimet Swedish Squash Open; Skellefteå, Sweden; Men : Challenger 5; 24 players - $5,500 −−−−−− Women : Challenger 5; 24 players - $5,500	20–24 March	(England) Kace Bartley; 11–9, 11–8, 5–11, 11–9 (1st PSA title)	(Scotland) Alison Thomson	(France) Énora Villard (Scotland) Georgia Adderley	(Ukraine) Alina Bushma (Switzerland) Cindy Merlo (England) Alicia Mead (England) Charlotte Jagger
The Lethbridge Pro-Am; Lethbridge, Canada; Men : Challenger 10; 16 players - $11,000	21–24 March	(Egypt) Mohamed ElSherbini; 9–11, 12–10, 9–11, 11–9, 11–3 (9th PSA title)	(Egypt) Omar Abdel Meguid	(France) Auguste Dussourd (Spain) Bernat Jaume	(Argentina) Robertino Pezzota (Canada) Shawn Delierre (Mexico) Alfredo Ávila (Malaysia) Mohd Syafiq Kamal
Slaight Music Granite Open; Toronto, Canada; Women : Challenger 10; 24 players - $11,000	24–28 March	(Canada) Samantha Cornett; 11–6, 11–9, 11–4 (12th PSA title)	(England) Jasmine Hutton	(Australia) Sarah Cardwell (England) Anna Kimberley	(Australia) Jessica Turnbull (Canada) Maria Toorpakay (France) Marie Stephan (Mexico) Diana García
Grasshopper Cup; Zürich, Switzerland; Men : World Tour Gold; 24 players - $110,000	26–31 March	(Egypt) Mohamed El Shorbagy; 11–8, 13–11, 11–8 (36th PSA title)	(Egypt) Tarek Momen	(Egypt) Karim Abdel Gawad (Egypt) Mohamed Abouelghar	(Egypt) Ali Farag (India) Saurav Ghosal (Colombia) Miguel Ángel Rodríguez (Germany) Simon Rösner
J Warren Young Memorial Texas Open; Dallas, United States; Women : World Tour Bronze; 24 players - $55,000	26–31 March	(United States) Amanda Sobhy; 11–4, 11–2, 11–5 (16th PSA title)	(England) Victoria Lust	(United States) Olivia Fiechter (Australia) Rachael Grinham	(England) Sarah-Jane Perry (Canada) Hollie Naughton (Belgium) Tinne Gilis (Egypt) Nadine Shahin
The CourtCare Northern Open; Manchester, England; Women : Challenger 10; 24 players - $11,000	27–31 March	(England) Julianne Courtice; 11–9, 11–9, 11–5 (4th PSA title)	(England) Rachael Chadwick	(South Africa) Milnay Louw (Egypt) Hana Ramadan	(France) Mélissa Alves (South Africa) Alexandra Fuller (Scotland) Alison Thomson (England) Elise Lazarus
Pure Blonde Elanora Open; Sydney, Australia; Men : Challenger 5; 16 players - $5,500	30–31 March	(Malaysia) Addeen Idrakie; 6–11, 11–1, 11–9, 11–7 (5th PSA title)	(New Zealand) Evan Williams	(Malaysia) Darren Rahul Pragasam (England) Connor Sheen	(Australia) Mike Corren (Japan) Tomotaka Endo (Malaysia) Ryan Pasqual (Malaysia) Bryan Lim Tze Kang

=== April ===
Tournament	Date	Champion	Runner-Up	Semifinalists	Quarterfinalists
CAS International Squash Championship; Islamabad, Pakistan; Men : Challenger 30; 24 players - $28,000	1–5 April	(Egypt) Mostafa Asal; 8–11, 7–11, 11–2, 11–1, 11–7 (4th PSA title)	(Egypt) Youssef Soliman	(Egypt) Karim Ali Fathy (Scotland) Greg Lobban	(Egypt) Mohamed ElSherbini (Egypt) Mazen Gamal (Egypt) Mohammed Reda (Pakistan) Tayyab Aslam
Pakistan International women's tournament Islamabad, Pakistan; Women : Challenger 10; 24 players - $11,000	1–5 April	(Egypt) Farida Mohamed; 11–8, 9–11, 11–9, 11–5 (3rd PSA title)	(Switzerland) Cindy Merlo	(Egypt) Sana Ibrahim (South Korea) Lee Ji-hyun	(Pakistan) Madina Zafar (Pakistan) Amna Fayyaz (Pakistan) Moqaddas Ashraf (Pakistan) Riffat Khan
The Racquet Club Pro-Series; St. Louis, United States; Women : Challenger 20; 24 players - $18,000	3–6 April	(Malaysia) Sivasangari Subramaniam; 9–11, 11–6, 13–11, 11–6 (10th PSA title)	(Egypt) Nada Abbas	(United States) Haley Mendez (United States) Olivia Fiechter	(Egypt) Menna Nasser (Finland) Emilia Soini (Hong Kong) Lee Ka Yi (Egypt) Salma Youssef
Springfield Scottish Open; Edinburgh, Scotland; Men : Challenger 10; 24 players - $11,000 −−−−−− Women : Challenger 10; 24 players - $11,000	3–7 April	(Spain) Edmon López; 13–11, 11–9, 8–11, 13–11 (7th PSA title)	(England) Patrick Rooney	(Scotland) Alan Clyne (Spain) Bernat Jaume	(France) Victor Crouin (Denmark) Kristian Frost (Canada) David Baillargeon (France) Sébastien Bonmalais
Springfield Scottish Open; Edinburgh, Scotland; Men : Challenger 10; 24 players - $11,000 −−−−−− Women : Challenger 10; 24 players - $11,000	3–7 April	(England) Lucy Turmel; 12–10, 13–11, 11–7 (3rd PSA title)	(France) Mélissa Alves	(England) Kace Bartley (Spain) Cristina Gómez	(Malaysia) Ooi Kah Yan (England) Jasmine Hutton (Pakistan) Faiza Zafar (Scotland) Georgia Adderley
Rochester Pro-Am; Rochester, United States; Men : Challenger 5; 24 players - $5,500	3–7 April	(Mexico) Leonel Cárdenas; 11–7, 11–6, 15–13 (5th PSA title)	(Mexico) Mario Yáñez	(Canada) Nick Sachvie (Mexico) Jesús Camacho	(England) Ashley Davies (United States) Faraz Khan (Canada) Cameron Seth (France) Enzo Corigliano
SRAM PSA 1 Kuala Lumpur, Malaysia; Men : Challenger 5; 24 players - $5,500 −−−−−− Women : Challenger 5; 24 players - $5,500	4–7 April	(Malaysia) Mohd Syafiq Kamal; 13–11, 9–11, 12–10, 10–12, 11–4 (4th PSA title)	(India) Aditya Jagtap	(Malaysia) Addeen Idrakie (Hong Kong) Tang Ming Hong	(Egypt) Moustafa El Sirty (Malaysia) Darren Rahul Pragasam (Malaysia) Ryan Pasqual (Malaysia) Duncan Lee
SRAM PSA 1 Kuala Lumpur, Malaysia; Men : Challenger 5; 24 players - $5,500 −−−−−− Women : Challenger 5; 24 players - $5,500	4–7 April	(Malaysia) Chan Yiwen; 11–3, 11–7, 11–4 (1st PSA title)	(Malaysia) Ainaa Amani	(Malaysia) Amirah Rosli (Malaysia) Wen Li Lai	(Malaysia) Heng Wai Wong (Malaysia) Kiro Manoharan (Malaysia) Jessica Keng (India) Urwashi Joshi
Serena Hotel Huawei International Tournament; Islamabad, Pakistan; Men : Challenger 20; 24 players - $18,000	6–10 April	(Egypt) Mohamed ElSherbini; 11–5, 5–11, 8–11, 11–7, 11–8 (10th PSA title)	(Pakistan) Farhan Mehboob	(Egypt) Karim Ali Fathy (Spain) Carlos Cornes	(Pakistan) Tayyab Aslam (Pakistan) Amaad Fareed (Pakistan) Asim Khan (Kuwait) Ammar Al-Tamimi
Richmond Open; Richmond, United States; Women : Challenger 10; 16 players - $11,000	9–13 April	(United States) Reeham Sedky; 11–7, 11–6, 11–4 (3rd PSA title)	(United States) Olivia Fiechter	(Latvia) Ineta Mackeviča (Egypt) Menna Nasser	(Colombia) Catalina Peláez (England) Anna Kimberley (United States) Laila Sedky (France) Marie Stephan
DPD Open; Eindhoven, Netherlands; Men : World Tour Gold; 24 players - $106,000 - Draw −−−−−− Women : World Tour Gold; 24 players - $106,000 - Draw	9–14 April	(Egypt) Ali Farag; 11–13, 11–6, 11–4, 11–4 (16th PSA title)	(Egypt) Mohamed El Shorbagy	(Egypt) Karim Abdel Gawad (Germany) Simon Rösner	(New Zealand) Paul Coll (Colombia) Miguel Ángel Rodríguez (Egypt) Marwan El Shorbagy (England) Declan James
DPD Open; Eindhoven, Netherlands; Men : World Tour Gold; 24 players - $106,000 - Draw −−−−−− Women : World Tour Gold; 24 players - $106,000 - Draw	9–14 April	(Egypt) Raneem El Weleily; 10–12, 9–11, 11–8, 11–8, 11–8 (21st PSA title)	(Egypt) Nour El Sherbini	(Egypt) Nour El Tayeb (France) Camille Serme	(United States) Amanda Sobhy (England) Laura Massaro (Wales) Tesni Evans (England) Sarah-Jane Perry
Macau Open; Macau, China; Men : World Tour Bronze; 24 players - $54,400 - Draw −−−−−− Women : World Tour Bronze; 24 players - $54,400 - Draw	10–14 April	(Peru) Diego Elías; 11–3, 11–4, 11–9 (6th PSA title)	(Egypt) Omar Mosaad	(Hong Kong) Yip Tsz Fung (Scotland) Greg Lobban	(India) Saurav Ghosal (Hong Kong) Max Lee (Hong Kong) Leo Au (Malaysia) Eain Yow
Macau Open; Macau, China; Men : World Tour Bronze; 24 players - $54,400 - Draw −−−−−− Women : World Tour Bronze; 24 players - $54,400 - Draw	10–14 April	(Hong Kong) Annie Au; 11–5, 13–11, 11–8 (16th PSA title)	(Malaysia) Low Wee Wern	(Egypt) Zeina Mickawy (India) Joshna Chinappa	(Canada) Samantha Cornett (Egypt) Nadine Shahin (Hong Kong) Joey Chan (Egypt) Mayar Hany
El Gouna International Squash Open; El Gouna, Egypt; Men : World Tour Platinum; 48 players - $176,000 - Draw −−−−−− Women : World Tour Platinum; 48 players - $176,000 - Draw	17–26 April	(Egypt) Ali Farag; 11–9, 12–10, 11–3 (17th PSA title)	(Egypt) Karim Abdel Gawad	(Egypt) Tarek Momen (Egypt) Fares Dessouky	(Egypt) Mohamed El Shorbagy (Germany) Simon Rösner (New Zealand) Paul Coll (Egypt) Marwan El Shorbagy
El Gouna International Squash Open; El Gouna, Egypt; Men : World Tour Platinum; 48 players - $176,000 - Draw −−−−−− Women : World Tour Platinum; 48 players - $176,000 - Draw	17–26 April	(Egypt) Raneem El Weleily; 11-8, 7–11, 12–10, 11–6 (22nd PSA title)	(Egypt) Nouran Gohar	(France) Camille Serme (United States) Amanda Sobhy	(Egypt) Nour El Sherbini (Egypt) Nour El Tayeb (England) Sarah-Jane Perry (New Zealand) Joelle King
Johannesburg Open; Johannesburg, South Africa; Men : Challenger 5; 24 players - $5,500 −−−−−− Women : Challenger 5; 24 players - $5,500	22–26 April	(Colombia) Juan Camilo Vargas; 11–6, 11–7, 11–3 (3rd PSA title)	(South Africa) Jean-Pierre Brits	(England) Nick Wall (France) Fabien Verseille	(Egypt) Omar Elkattan (England) Tom Walsh (Zimbabwe) Blessing Muhwati (Switzerland) Amadeo Costa
Johannesburg Open; Johannesburg, South Africa; Men : Challenger 5; 24 players - $5,500 −−−−−− Women : Challenger 5; 24 players - $5,500	22–26 April	(England) Jasmine Hutton; 11–8, 11–8, 4–11, 12–10 (1st PSA title)	(South Africa) Milnay Louw	(Egypt) Sana Ibrahim (South Africa) Alexa Pienaar	(Egypt) Nour Aboulmakarim (South Africa) Bongi Seroto (South Africa) Angie Clifton-Parks (South Africa) Michele Lea Kohne
SRAM PSA 2 Kuala Lumpur, Malaysia; Men : Challenger 5; 24 players - $5,500 −−−−−− Women : Challenger 5; 24 players - $5,500	23–26 April	(Malaysia) Addeen Idrakie; 11–8, 11–13, 11–7, 11–8 (6th PSA title)	(Malaysia) Mohd Syafiq Kamal	(Malaysia) Darren Rahul Pragasam (Japan) Tomotaka Endo	(Japan) Ryunosuke Tsukue (Hong Kong) Harley Lam (Philippines) Robert Garcia (Malaysia) Amir Amirul
SRAM PSA 2 Kuala Lumpur, Malaysia; Men : Challenger 5; 24 players - $5,500 −−−−−− Women : Challenger 5; 24 players - $5,500	23–26 April	(Japan) Satomi Watanabe; 7–11, 11–4, 11–8, 11–4 (2nd PSA title)	(Malaysia) Ooi Kah Yan	(Philippines) Jemyca Aribado (Malaysia) Wen Li Lai	(Malaysia) Yee Xin Ying (Malaysia) Heng Wai Wong (Malaysia) Jessica Keng (Malaysia) Ainaa Amani
Cannon Kirk Irish Squash Open (Republic of Ireland) Dublin, Ireland; Men : Challenger 20; 24 players - $18,000 −−−−−− Women : Challenger 20; 24 players - $18,000	23–27 April	(New Zealand) Campbell Grayson; 11–6, 11–8, 11–7 (13th PSA title)	(India) Mahesh Mangaonkar	(Czech Republic) Daniel Mekbib (Wales) Peter Creed	(Scotland) Alan Clyne (France) Benjamin Aubert (Egypt) Karim El Hammamy (England) Richie Fallows
Cannon Kirk Irish Squash Open (Republic of Ireland) Dublin, Ireland; Men : Challenger 20; 24 players - $18,000 −−−−−− Women : Challenger 20; 24 players - $18,000	23–27 April	(Belgium) Nele Gilis; 11–6, 11–7, 11–7 (6th PSA title)	(South Africa) Alexandra Fuller	(England) Millie Tomlinson (New Zealand) Amanda Landers-Murphy	(Egypt) Hana Ramadan (Belgium) Tinne Gilis (France) Énora Villard (England) Rachael Chadwick
Bourbon Trail Event No4; Chattanooga, United States; Women : Challenger 5; 16 players - $5,500	24–27 April	(United States) Marina Stefanoni; 11–5, 11–9, 11–8 (2nd PSA title)	(France) Marie Stephan	(Latvia) Ineta Mackeviča (United States) Nessrine Ariffin	(South Africa) Elani Landman (Argentina) Pilar Etchechoury (South Africa) Lume Landman (India) Akanksha Salunkhe
Keith Grainger Memorial UCT Open; Cape Town, South Africa; Men : Challenger 5; 24 players - $5,500 −−−−−− Women : Challenger 5; 16 players - $5,500	29 Apr.–3 May	(Colombia) Juan Camilo Vargas; 16–18, 11–3, 11–8, 11–4 (4th PSA title)	(France) Fabien Verseille	(England) Nick Wall (Zambia) Kelvin Ndhlovu	(Zimbabwe) Blessing Muhwati (South Africa) Adam Shean (South Africa) Jean-Pierre Brits (South Africa) Gareth Naidoo
Keith Grainger Memorial UCT Open; Cape Town, South Africa; Men : Challenger 5; 24 players - $5,500 −−−−−− Women : Challenger 5; 16 players - $5,500	29 Apr.–3 May	(England) Jasmine Hutton; 8–11, 6–11, 11–5, 11–5, 11–5 (2nd PSA title)	(South Africa) Milnay Louw	(Egypt) Nour Aboulmakarim (South Africa) Alexa Pienaar	(Egypt) Sana Ibrahim (South Africa) Miranda Lang (Nigeria) Olatunji Busayo (England) Tayla Mounter

=== May ===
Tournament	Date	Champion	Runner-Up	Semifinalists	Quarterfinalists
Hyder Trophy; New York City, United States; Men : Challenger 10; 24 players - $11,000	1–5 May	(France) Auguste Dussourd; 11–9, 12–10, 11–4 (5th PSA title)	(United States) Andrew Douglas	(Sweden) Rasmus Hult (England) Jaymie Haycocks	(Mexico) Leonel Cárdenas (Finland) Henrik Mustonen (Pakistan) Farhan Zaman (Mexico) Jesús Camacho
Sandgate MS Open; Deagon, Australia; Women : Challenger 5; 16 players - $5,500	3–6 May	(Australia) Jessica Turnbull; 13–11, 11–8, 7–11, 8–11, 11–2 (2nd PSA title)	(Australia) Sarah Cardwell	(New Zealand) Abbie Palmer (Malaysia) Aika Azman	(Malta) Colette Sultana (Australia) Alex Haydon (Australia) Taylor Flavell (Australia) Katie Davies
Pembroke Management Montréal Open; Montreal, Canada; Men : Challenger 30; 24 players - $28,000	6–10 May	(England) Adrian Waller; 5–11, 11–1, 11–4, 11–2 (7th PSA title)	(Mexico) Arturo Salazar	(Egypt) Mohamed ElSherbini (France) Auguste Dussourd	(Canada) Nick Sachvie (France) Victor Crouin (Mexico) Mario Yáñez (United States) Chris Hanson
3rd Rhiwbina Welsh Open; Cardiff, Wales; Men : Challenger 10; 24 players - $11,000	7–11 May	(England) Richie Fallows; 11–6, 11–8, 11–3 (6th PSA title)	(Spain) Edmon López	(France) Benjamin Aubert (India) Abhay Singh	(Wales) Owain Taylor (Wales) Emyr Evans (Wales) Peter Creed (Italy) Yuri Farneti
Mar del Plata Open; Mar del Plata, Argentina; Men : Challenger 5; 24 players - $5,500	7–11 May	(Scotland) Rory Stewart; 11–4, 11–3, 11–8 (1st PSA title)	(Colombia) Edgar Ramírez	(Japan) Ryosei Kobayashi (Argentina) Miguel Pujol	(Paraguay) Francesco Marcantonio (Argentina) Robertino Pezzota (England) Curtis Malik (Argentina) Gonzalo Miranda
Manchester Open; Manchester, England; Women : World Tour Silver; 24 players - $76,000 - Draw	9–13 May	(New Zealand) Joelle King; 11–8, 11–2, 11–4 (13th PSA title)	(Wales) Tesni Evans	(Egypt) Nour El Tayeb (United States) Amanda Sobhy	(England) Sarah-Jane Perry (England) Laura Massaro (England) Alison Waters (Egypt) Nouran Gohar
The Wimbledon Club Squared Open; London, England; Men : World Tour Bronze; 24 players - $51,250	11–16 May	(Egypt) Marwan El Shorbagy; 13–11, 11–7, 11–6 (10th PSA title)	(Spain) Iker Pajares	(Egypt) Mostafa Asal (England) James Willstrop	(France) Baptiste Masotti (England) Daryl Selby (France) Lucas Serme (India) Mahesh Mangaonkar
Garavan's West of Ireland Open (Republic of Ireland) Galway, Ireland; Men : Challenger 10; 24 players - $11,000	14–18 May	(England) Richie Fallows; 11–5, 11–4, 11–7 (7th PSA title)	(England) Nathan Lake	(France) Sébastien Bonmalais (England) Patrick Rooney	(England) Mark Fuller (England) Robert Downer (Austria) Aqeel Rehman (England) Harry Falconer
Colón Open; Colón, Argentina; Men : Challenger 10; 24 players - $11,000	14–18 May	(France) Auguste Dussourd; 11–6, 11–9, 3–11, 11–8 (6th PSA title)	(Argentina) Robertino Pezzota	(Malaysia) Asyraf Azan (Argentina) Leandro Romiglio	(Canada) Michael McCue (Japan) Tomotaka Endo (Scotland) Rory Stewart (India) Aditya Jagtap
Solomon Markets CityView Open; Long Island City, NY, United States; Men : Challenger 5; 24 players - $5,500	14–18 May	(Canada) Cameron Seth; 11–8, 11–7 11–5 (1st PSA title)	(Japan) Ryosei Kobayashi	(United States) Faraz Khan (England) Lyell Fuller	(South Africa) Tristan Eysele (India) Rishi Tandon (United States) Spencer Lovejoy (Canada) Darosham Khan
Harneys BVI Open; Road Town, British Virgin Islands; Women : Challenger 5; 16 players - $5,500	16–18 May	(United States) Marina Stefanoni; 7–11, 7–11, 11–4, 11–4, 11–5 (3rd PSA title)	(Colombia) Laura Tovar	(Colombia) María Tovar (Germany) Daniela Schumann	(British Virgin Islands) Jane Wyllie (British Virgin Islands) Zoe Sorrentino (British Virgin Islands) Colesha Corea (British Virgin Islands) Darci Reich
Resistencia Open; Resistencia, Argentina; Men : Challenger 10; 24 players - $11,000	20–25 May	(Mexico) Leonel Cárdenas; 13–11, 12–10, 7–11, 8–11, 11–9 (6th PSA title)	(Argentina) Robertino Pezzota	(France) Victor Crouin (India) Aditya Jagtap	(Canada) David Baillargeon (Scotland) Rory Stewart (Argentina) Leandro Romiglio (Colombia) Ronald Palomino
Sekisui Open; Kriens, Switzerland; Men : Challenger 10; 24 players - $11,000	21–25 May	(India) Mahesh Mangaonkar; 11–9, 3–11, 11–5, 11–5 (8th PSA title)	(Spain) Bernat Jaume	(Czech Republic) Daniel Mekbib (Denmark) Kristian Frost	(France) Fabien Verseille (Finland) Miko Äijänen (Switzerland) Reiko Peter (Spain) Hugo Varela
Allam British Open; Hull, England; Men : World Tour Platinum; 48 players - $162,000 - Draw −−−−−− Women : World Tour Platinum; 48 players - $162,000 - Draw	20–26 May	(Egypt) Mohamed El Shorbagy; 11–9, 5–11, 11–5, 11–9 (37th PSA title)	(Egypt) Ali Farag	(New Zealand) Paul Coll (Egypt) Karim Abdel Gawad	(Germany) Simon Rösner (Egypt) Mazen Hesham (Egypt) Mohamed Abouelghar (Colombia) Miguel Ángel Rodríguez
Allam British Open; Hull, England; Men : World Tour Platinum; 48 players - $162,000 - Draw −−−−−− Women : World Tour Platinum; 48 players - $162,000 - Draw	20–26 May	(Egypt) Nouran Gohar; 11–3, 11–8, 11–3 (7th PSA title)	(France) Camille Serme	(England) Sarah-Jane Perry (Egypt) Nour El Tayeb	(Egypt) Nour El Sherbini (Belgium) Nele Gilis (Egypt) Raneem El Weleily (New Zealand) Joelle King
Open International des Volcans; Clermont-Ferrand, France; Men : WSF/PSA Satellite; 32 players - $2,500 −−−−−− Women : Challenger 5; 24 players - $5,500	23–26 May	(France) Sébastien Bonmalais; 11–8, 13–11, 11–7	(France) Benjamin Aubert	(France) Johan Bouquet (France) Yann Perrin	(France) Enzo Corigliano (France) Edwin Clain (France) Lucas Rousselet (France) Guillaume Duquennoy
Open International des Volcans; Clermont-Ferrand, France; Men : WSF/PSA Satellite; 32 players - $2,500 −−−−−− Women : Challenger 5; 24 players - $5,500	23–26 May	(France) Énora Villard; 11–4, 11–5, 11–8 (2nd PSA title)	(Latvia) Ineta Mackeviča	(France) Chloé Mesic (Scotland) Alison Thomson	(United States) Marina Stefanoni (England) Kace Bartley (Poland) Karina Tyma (England) Charlotte Jagger
Life Time Philadelphia Open; Philadelphia, United States; Men : Challenger 10; 24 players - $11,000	28 May–1 Jun.	(Egypt) Shehab Essam; 11–8, 11–4, 11–4 (5th PSA title)	(India) Aditya Jagtap	(England) Lyell Fuller (United States) Timothy Brownell	(United States) Faraz Khan (Canada) Shawn Delierre (United States) Spencer Lovejoy (England) Mark Broekman
Paraguay Open; Asunción, Paraguay; Men : Challenger 10; 24 players - $11,000	28 May–1 Jun.	(Argentina) Robertino Pezzota; 8–11, 11–2, 8–11, 11–8, 11–9 (11th PSA title)	(Mexico) Leonel Cárdenas	(Scotland) Rory Stewart (Egypt) Yaḥya Elnawasany	(Brazil) Diego Gobbi (Colombia) Edgar Ramírez (Japan) Tomotaka Endo (Mexico) Miled Zarazúa
Migdal Insurance PSA Tel Aviv; Tel Aviv, Israel; Men : Challenger 10; 24 players - $11,000	29 May–1 Jun.	(Spain) Iker Pajares; 11–9, 11–2, 11–3 (9th PSA title)	(Spain) Edmon López	(Czech Republic) Jakub Solnický (Portugal) Cláudio Pinto	(Spain) Hugo Varela (Switzerland) Robin Gadola (England) Harry Falconer (France) Fabien Verseille
XII Torneo Internacional PSA Sporta; Guatemala City, Guatemala; Men : World Tour Bronze; 24 players - $52,500	29 May–2 Jun.	(Colombia) Miguel Ángel Rodríguez; 10–12, 13–11, 115, 11–9 (29th PSA title)	(Peru) Diego Elías	(Mexico) Alfredo Ávila (Mexico) César Salazar	(Mexico) Arturo Salazar (Colombia) Juan Camilo Vargas (United States) Chris Hanson (Egypt) Karim El Hammamy
5R Montpellier Métropole Open; Montpellier, France; Men : Challenger 30; 24 players - $28,000	29 May–2 Jun.	(France) Grégoire Marche; 11–4, 11–9, 11–2 (9th PSA title)	(England) James Willstrop	(England) Chris Simpson (France) Sébastien Bonmalais	(India) Mahesh Mangaonkar (Belgium) Jan Van Den Herrewegen (France) Benjamin Aubert (Finland) Olli Tuominen
City of Kalgoorlie Golden Open; Kalgoorlie, Australia; Men : Challenger 5; 24 players - $5,500 −−−−−− Women : Challenger 5; 16 players - $5,500	31 May–3 Jun.	(Japan) Ryunosuke Tsukue; 11–8, 6–11, 11–6, 11–5 (1st PSA title)	(Malaysia) Mohd Syafiq Kamal	(Malaysia) Darren Rahul Pragasam (Malaysia) Addeen Idrakie	(Malaysia) Bryan Lim Tze Kang (Australia) David Ilich (Hong Kong) Chung Yat Long (Malaysia) Darren Chan
City of Kalgoorlie Golden Open; Kalgoorlie, Australia; Men : Challenger 5; 24 players - $5,500 −−−−−− Women : Challenger 5; 16 players - $5,500	31 May–3 Jun.	(Hong Kong) Vanessa Chu; 6–11, 11–9, 11–9, 11–5 (7th PSA title)	(Australia) Jessica Turnbull	(Malaysia) Chan Yiwen (Malta) Colette Sultana	(Malaysia) Aika Azman (Australia) Shehana Vithana (Australia) Selena Shaikh (Malaysia) Wen Li Lai

=== June ===
Tournament	Date	Champion	Runner-Up	Semifinalists	Quarterfinalists
Austrian Open; Salzburg, Austria; Men : Challenger 5; 16 players - $5,500	5–8 June	(Finland) Miko Äijänen; 11–13, 11–2, 11–4, 11–3 (4th PSA title)	(England) Lyell Fuller	(Scotland) Angus Gillams (Germany) Valentin Rapp	(Russia) Vladislav Titov (Austria) Aqeel Rehman (Switzerland) Cédric Kuchen (Spain) Sergio García
InspireNet International Squash Classic; Palmerston North, New Zealand; Men : Challenger 10; 24 players - $11,000 −−−−−− Women : Challenger 5; 16 players - $5,500	5–9 June	(Australia) Rex Hedrick; 7-11, 11–6, 12–10, 11–7 (15th PSA title)	(New Zealand) Evan Williams	(Japan) Ryunosuke Tsukue (Republic of Ireland) Sean Conroy	(England) Connor Sheen (Australia) Thomas Calvert (New Zealand) Lwamba Chileshe (Singapore) Samuel Kang
InspireNet International Squash Classic; Palmerston North, New Zealand; Men : Challenger 10; 24 players - $11,000 −−−−−− Women : Challenger 5; 16 players - $5,500	5–9 June	(Malaysia) Wen Li Lai; 11–9, 5–11, 11–4, 8–11, 11–8 (1st PSA title)	(New Zealand) Emma Millar	(New Zealand) Kaitlyn Watts (Czech Republic) Michaela Čepová	(New Zealand) Abbie Palmer (England) Charlotte Jagger (South Korea) Lee Ji-hyun (New Zealand) Anika Jackson
Grand Sport Armenian 3rd W5 Challenger; Yerevan, Armenia; Women : Challenger 5; 16 players - $5,500	6–9 June	(Egypt) Farida Mohamed; 9–11, 11–3, 11–8, 13–11 (4th PSA title)	(Poland) Karina Tyma	(Ukraine) Nadiya Usenko (Ukraine) Alina Bushma	(Egypt) Farah Momen (Wales) Ali Loke (Iran) Arezou Mousavi (Ukraine) Julia Zhukovets
CIB PSA World Tour Finals; Cairo, Egypt; Men : World Tour Finals; 8 players - $160,000 - Draw −−−−−− Women : World Tour Finals; 8 players - $160,000 - Draw	9–14 June	(Egypt) Karim Abdel Gawad; 12–10, 11–6, 5–11, 8–11, 12–10 (1st PSA Finals title) (21st PSA title)	(Egypt) Mohamed Abouelghar	(Egypt) Tarek Momen (Egypt) Mohamed El Shorbagy	(Egypt) Ali Farag (Peru) Diego Elías (Germany) Simon Rösner (New Zealand) Paul Coll
CIB PSA World Tour Finals; Cairo, Egypt; Men : World Tour Finals; 8 players - $160,000 - Draw −−−−−− Women : World Tour Finals; 8 players - $160,000 - Draw	9–14 June	(Egypt) Raneem El Weleily; 3–11, 8–11, 11–7, 11–4, 11–6 (1st PSA Finals title) (23rd PSA title)	(France) Camille Serme	(Egypt) Nour El Tayeb (Egypt) Nouran Gohar	(Egypt) Nour El Sherbini (England) Sarah-Jane Perry (Wales) Tesni Evans (New Zealand) Joelle King
Prague Open; Prague, Czech Republic; Men : Challenger 5; 24 players - $5,500	10–14 June	(Denmark) Kristian Frost; 11–3, 11–7, 11–2 (16th PSA title)	(Finland) Miko Äijänen	(Hungary) Balázs Farkas (England) Miles Jenkins	(Czech Republic) Jakub Solnický (Wales) Owain Taylor (Czech Republic) Viktor Byrtus (Czech Republic) Ondřej Vorlíček
FMC International Men's Championship; Lahore, Pakistan; Men : Challenger 10; 24 players - $11,000	11–15 June	(Pakistan) Tayyab Aslam; 11–8, 11–6, 11–4 (6th PSA title)	(Pakistan) Danish Atlas Khan	(Pakistan) Amaad Fareed (Pakistan) Zahir Shah	(Pakistan) Abdul Malik Khan (Pakistan) Syed Ali Bokhari (Pakistan) Asim Khan (Pakistan) Khawaja Adil Maqbool
White Nights Open; Saint Petersburg, Russia; Men : Challenger 5; 24 players - $5,500 −−−−−− Women : WSF/PSA Satellite; 16 players - $1,000	20–22 June	(Finland) Miko Äijänen; 13–11, 11–8, 11–2 (5th PSA title)	(Hungary) Balázs Farkas	(Czech Republic) Ondřej Uherka (Sweden) Erik Jakobsson	(Germany) Julius Benthin (Singapore) Chua Man Chin (Israel) Ido Burstein (Ukraine) Valeriy Fedoruk
White Nights Open; Saint Petersburg, Russia; Men : Challenger 5; 24 players - $5,500 −−−−−− Women : WSF/PSA Satellite; 16 players - $1,000	20–22 June	(Russia) Varvara Esina; 17–15, 11–7, 10–12, 6–11, 11–9	(Russia) Ekaterina Marusan	(Russia) Olga Severinova (Ukraine) Anastasia Kostiukova	(Russia) Alina Medved (Belarus) Olga Khmelevskaya (Russia) Ksenia Kesh (Russia) Aleksandra Onegova
ILT & Community Trust NZ Southern Open; Invercargill, New Zealand; Men : Challenger 10; 24 players - $11,000	19–23 June	(New Zealand) Evan Williams; 11–8, 11–8, 13–11 (6th PSA title)	(Hong Kong) Henry Leung	(Hong Kong) Chi Him Wong (England) Connor Sheen	(Republic of Ireland) Sean Conroy (France) Enzo Corigliano (Hong Kong) Tang Ming Hong (Jamaica) Christopher Binnie
Life Time Mississauga Open; Mississauga, Canada; Men : Challenger 5; 24 players - $5,500	19–23 June	(United States) Spencer Lovejoy; 8–11, 11–7, 11–6, 6–11, 14–12 (1st PSA title)	(Portugal) Rui Soares	(Nigeria) Babatunde Ajagbe (United States) Cole Becker	(United States) Timothy Brownell (Mexico) Leonel Cárdenas (Egypt) Mohamed Nabil (Pakistan) Naveed Rehman
Gibraltar Open; Gibraltar; Men : Challenger 5; 16 players - $5,500	27–29 June	(Scotland) Angus Gillams; 9–11, 11–6, 11–6, 11–5 (8th PSA title)	(Czech Republic) Martin Švec	(England) Stuart MacGregor (England) Nick Wall	(Brazil) Diego Gobbi (Croatia) Martin Kegel (Germany) Valentin Rapp (Brazil) Vini Rodrigues
Mulgrave Country Club Victorian Open; Wheelers Hill, Australia; Men : Challenger 5; 16 players - $5,500 −−−−−− Women : WSF/PSA Satellite; 6 players - $2,000	27–30 June	(France) Victor Crouin; 11–2, 11–4, 11–2 (5th PSA title)	(Australia) Rex Hedrick	(Netherlands) Roshan Bharos (France) Enzo Corigliano	(Egypt) Shady El Sherbiny (Malaysia) Darren Chan (Malaysia) Bryan Lim Tze Kang (Australia) Nicholas Calvert
Mulgrave Country Club Victorian Open; Wheelers Hill, Australia; Men : Challenger 5; 16 players - $5,500 −−−−−− Women : WSF/PSA Satellite; 6 players - $2,000	27–30 June	(Australia) Sarah Cardwell; 11–4, 11–3, 11–2	(England) Charlotte Jagger	(Australia) Shehana Vithana (Australia) Selena Shaikh	(Australia) Taylor Flavell (Australia) Maria Kalafatis

=== July ===
Tournament	Date	Champion	Runner-Up	Semifinalists	Quarterfinalists
Australian Open; Bega, Australia; Men : Challenger 10; 24 players - $12,000 −−−−−− Women : Challenger 10; 24 players - $12,000	3–7 July	(France) Victor Crouin; 11–8, 11–5, 11–4 (6th PSA title)	(Malaysia) Mohd Syafiq Kamal	(Japan) Tomotaka Endo (Malaysia) Addeen Idrakie	(England) Connor Sheen (Egypt) Shady El Sherbiny (Netherlands) Roshan Bharos (Japan) Naoki Hayashi
Australian Open; Bega, Australia; Men : Challenger 10; 24 players - $12,000 −−−−−− Women : Challenger 10; 24 players - $12,000	3–7 July	(Malaysia) Sivasangari Subramaniam; 11-5, 9–11, 9–11, 9–11 (11th PSA title)	(Japan) Satomi Watanabe	(Malaysia) Rachel Arnold (Australia) Christine Nunn	(Hong Kong) Lee Ka Yi (Australia) Jessica Turnbull (Hong Kong) Vanessa Chu (Egypt) Nadeen Kotb
Tasmanian Open; Devonport, Australia; Men : Challenger 10; 24 players - $11,000	11–14 July	(France) Victor Crouin; 11–4, 11–8, 11–0 (7th PSA title)	(Malaysia) Mohd Syafiq Kamal	(Malaysia) Addeen Idrakie (Japan) Tomotaka Endo	(Australia) Joseph White (Netherlands) Roshan Bharos (England) Connor Sheen (Japan) Naoki Hayashi
QSF Open; Doha, Qatar; Men : Challenger 30; 24 players - $28,000	20–24 July	(Hong Kong) Leo Au; 11–5, 11–7, 13–11 (11th PSA title)	(Qatar) Abdulla Al-Tamimi	(India) Mahesh Mangaonkar (Egypt) Youssef Ibrahim	(Pakistan) Asim Khan (France) Sébastien Bonmalais (France) Victor Crouin (Pakistan) Tayyab Aslam

== Statistical information ==
The players/nations are sorted by:

1. Total number of titles;
2. Cumulated importance of those titles;
3. Alphabetical order (by family names for players).

=== Key ===
World Championship
World Tour Platinum
World Tour Gold
World Tour Silver
World Tour Bronze
Challenger Tour 5/10/20/30

=== Titles won by player (men's) ===
Total	Player	World Cham.	Platinum	Gold	Silver	Bronze	Challenger 30	Challenger 20	Challenger 10	Challenger 5
6	Ali Farag (EGY)	●	●●●	●●						
6	Youssef Ibrahim (EGY)							●	●●●●	●
4	Mohamed El Shorbagy (EGY)		●●●	●						
4	Mohamed ElSherbini (EGY)							●●	●●	
4	Victor Crouin (FRA)								●●	●●
4	Henry Leung (HKG)								●	●●●
4	Miko Äijänen (FIN)									●●●●
3	Richie Fallows (ENG)							●	●●	
3	Rex Hedrick (AUS)								●●●	
3	Vikram Malhotra (IND)								●●●	
3	Mahesh Mangaonkar (IND)								●●●	
3	Baptiste Masotti (FRA)								●●●	
3	Leonel Cárdenas (MEX)								●●	●
3	Dimitri Steinmann (SUI)								●	●●
3	Balázs Farkas (HUN)									●●●
3	Aditya Jagtap (IND)									●●●
3	Juan Camilo Vargas (COL)									●●●
2	Karim Abdel Gawad (EGY)		●			●				
2	Mohamed Abouelghar (EGY)			●	●					
2	Tarek Momen (EGY)			●	●					
2	Diego Elías (PER)				●	●				
2	Grégoire Marche (FRA)					●	●			
2	Youssef Soliman (EGY)						●	●		
2	Auguste Dussourd (FRA)								●●	
2	Edmon López (ESP)								●●	
2	Iker Pajares (ESP)								●●	
2	Robertino Pezzota (ARG)								●●	
2	Tayyab Aslam (PAK)							●	●	
2	Shehab Essam (EGY)								●	●
2	Kristian Frost (DEN)									●●
2	Addeen Idrakie (MYS)									●●
1	Paul Coll (NZL)			●						
1	Marwan El Shorbagy (EGY)					●				
1	Miguel Ángel Rodríguez (COL)					●				
1	Daryl Selby (ENG)					●				
1	Mostafa Asal (EGY)						●			
1	Leo Au (HKG)						●			
1	Ryan Cuskelly (AUS)						●			
1	Saurav Ghosal (IND)						●			
1	Declan James (ENG)						●			
1	Max Lee (HKG)						●			
1	Adrian Waller (ENG)						●			
1	Campbell Grayson (NZL)							●		
1	James Willstrop (ENG)							●		
1	Ivan Yuen (MYS)							●		
1	Alfredo Ávila (MEX)								●	
1	Chris Hanson (USA)								●	
1	Todd Harrity (USA)								●	
1	Shahjahan Khan (PAK)								●	
1	Henrik Mustonen (FIN)								●	
1	Ramit Tandon (IND)								●	
1	Olli Tuominen (FIN)								●	
1	Evan Williams (NZL)								●	
1	Jami Äijänen (FIN)									●
1	Christophe André (FRA)									●
1	Benjamin Aubert (FRA)									●
1	David Baillargeon (CAN)									●
1	Jesús Camacho (MEX)									●
1	Darren Chan (MYS)									●
1	Tomotaka Endo (JPN)									●
1	Angus Gillams (SCO)									●
1	Jaymie Haycocks (ENG)									●
1	Mohd Syafiq Kamal (MYS)									●
1	Faraz Khan (USA)									●
1	Alex Lau (HKG)									●
1	Spencer Lovejoy (USA)									●
1	Daniel Mekbib (CZE)									●
1	Nick Sachvie (CAN)									●
1	Cameron Seth (CAN)									●
1	Rui Soares (POR)									●
1	Rory Stewart (SCO)									●
1	Ryunosuke Tsukue (JPN)									●
1	Jan Van Den Herrewegen (BEL)									●
1	Fabien Verseille (FRA)									●

=== Titles won by nation (men's) ===
Total	Nation	World Cham.	Platinum	Gold	Silver	Bronze	Challenger 30	Challenger 20	Challenger 10	Challenger 5
31	Egypt (EGY)	●	●●●●●●●	●●●●●	●●	●●	●●	●●●●	●●●●●●●	●
14	France (FRA)					●	●		●●●●●●●	●●●●●
11	India (IND)						●		●●●●●●●	●●●
8	England (ENG)					●	●●	●●	●●	●
7	Hong Kong (HKG)						●●		●	●●●●
7	Finland (FIN)								●●	●●●●●
5	Malaysia (MYS)							●		●●●●
5	Mexico (MEX)								●●●	●●
4	Colombia (COL)					●				●●●
4	Australia (AUS)						●		●●●	
4	Spain (ESP)								●●●●	
4	United States (USA)								●●	●●
3	New Zealand (NZL)			●				●	●	
3	Pakistan (PAK)							●	●●	
3	Switzerland (SUI)								●	●●
3	Canada (CAN)									●●●
3	Hungary (HUN)									●●●
2	Peru (PER)				●	●				
2	Argentina (ARG)								●●	
2	Denmark (DEN)									●●</
2	Japan (JPN)									●●
2	Scotland (SCO)									●●
1	Belgium (BEL)									●
1	Czech Republic (CZE)									●
1	Portugal (POR)									●

=== Titles won by player (women's) ===
Total	Player	World Cham.	Platinum	Gold	Silver	Bronze	Challenger 30	Challenger 20	Challenger 10	Challenger 5
5	Raneem El Weleily (EGY)		●●	●●●						
4	Farida Mohamed (EGY)								●	●●●
3	Samantha Cornett (CAN)								●●●	
3	Lisa Aitken (SCO)								●	●●
3	Low Wee Wern (MYS)								●	●●
3	Mélissa Alves (FRA)									●●●
3	Marina Stefanoni (USA)									●●●
2	Nour El Sherbini (EGY)	●	●							
2	Joelle King (NZL)		●		●					
2	Nour El Tayeb (EGY)					●●				
2	Annie Au (HKG)					●	●			
2	Hania El Hammamy (EGY)						●	●		
2	Nele Gilis (BEL)							●●		
2	Reeham Sedky (USA)							●	●	
2	Sivasangari Subramaniam (MYS)							●	●	
2	Vanessa Chu (HKG)									●●
2	Jasmine Hutton (ENG)									●●
1	Nouran Gohar (EGY)		●							
1	Sarah-Jane Perry (ENG)				●					
1	Amanda Sobhy (USA)					●				
1	Yathreb Adel (EGY)							●		
1	Olivia Blatchford Clyne (USA)							●		
1	Laura Massaro (ENG)							●		
1	Emily Whitlock (ENG)							●		
1	Julianne Courtice (ENG)								●	
1	Rowan Elaraby (EGY)								●	
1	Zeina Mickawy (EGY)								●	
1	Fiona Moverley (ENG)								●	
1	Sabrina Sobhy (USA)								●	
1	Lucy Turmel (ENG)								●	
1	Milou van der Heijden (NED)								●	
1	Kace Bartley (ENG)									●
1	Olivia Fiechter (USA)									●
1	Menna Hamed (EGY)									●
1	Wen Li Lai (MYS)									●
1	Christine Nunn (AUS)									●
1	Jessica Turnbull (AUS)									●
1	Énora Villard (FRA)									●
1	Chan Yiwen (MYS)									●
1	Satomi Watanabe (JPN)									●

=== Titles won by nation (women's) ===
Total	Nation	World Cham.	Platinum	Gold	Silver	Bronze	Challenger 30	Challenger 20	Challenger 10	Challenger 5
20	Egypt (EGY)	●	●●●●	●●●		●●	●	●●	●●●	●●●●
9	England (ENG)				●			●●	●●●	●●●
9	United States (USA)					●		●●	●●	●●●●
7	Malaysia (MYS)							●	●●	●●●●
4	Hong Kong (HKG)					●	●			●●
4	France (FRA)									●●●●
3	Canada (CAN)								●●●	
3	Scotland (SCO)								●	●●
2	New Zealand (NZL)		●		●					
2	Belgium (BEL)							●●		
2	Australia (AUS)									●●
1	Netherlands (NED)								●	
1	Japan (JPN)									●

=== World Championship qualifiers ===
Winners of a select group of PSA Challenger Tour tournaments chosen by PSA receive a wildcard for the 2019 PSA World Championship. The qualified players were:

Player	Date	Tournament	Tier
Dimitri Steinmann (SUI)	2 September 2018	North Coast Open	PSA Challenger Tour 5
Christine Nunn (AUS)	2 September 2018	North Coast Open	PSA Challenger Tour 5
Todd Harrity (USA)	23 September 2018	Madeira Island Open	PSA Challenger Tour 10
Shahjahan Khan (PAK)	17 November 2018	Simon Warder Memorial	PSA Challenger Tour 10
Samantha Cornett (CAN)	17 November 2018	Simon Warder Memorial	PSA Challenger Tour 10
Menna Hamed (EGY)	18 November 2018	2nd PwC Open	PSA Challenger Tour 5
Youssef Ibrahim (EGY)	18 November 2018	Romanian Open	PSA Challenger Tour 5
Mélissa Alves (FRA)	1 December 2018	Tournoi Féminin Val de Marne	PSA Challenger Tour 5
Ramit Tandon (IND)	18 February 2019	EM Noll Classic	PSA Challenger Tour 10
Menna Nasser (EGY)	18 February 2019	EM Noll Classic	PSA Challenger Tour 10

== National championships ==
These are the winners of the most relevant 2018–2019 national squash championships.

Country	Date	Venue	Men's champion	Women's champion
Argentina	December 7–9, 2018	Casal Squash Gym, Mar del Plata	Robertino Pezzota	Pilar Etchechoury
Australia	June 22–23, 2019	Carrara Squash Centre, Carrara	Ryan Cuskelly	Donna Lobban
Austria	February 8–10, 2019	Gemeinde-Sporthalle, Wiener Neudorf	Aqeel Rehman	Birgit Coufal
Belarus	January 26, 2019	Squashlife, Minsk	Bogdan Litvinov	Olga Khmelevskaya
Belgium	February 14–17, 2019	Aramis Club, Mons	Jan Van Den Herrewegen	Nele Gilis
Bermuda	February 12–15, 2019	Bermuda Squash Racquets Association, Devonshire	Noah Browne	Rachel Barnes
Brazil	November 15–18, 2018	Esporte Clube Pinheiros, São Paulo	Diego Gobbi	Tatiana Borges
Bulgaria	March 30, 2019	Fireball Sports Hall, Sofia	Stoil Zhilev	Kalina Tsoneva
Canada	May 1–4, 2019	Mayfair Lakeshore, Toronto	Nick Sachvie	Samantha Cornett
China	December 14–16, 2018	Yangzhou Southern Sports Park, Yangzhou	Shen Jiaqi	Li Dongjin
Colombia	November 9–11, 2018	Club El Nogal, Bogotá	Erick Herrera	Laura Tovar
Croatia	February 16–17, 2019	First Fitness & Squash Tower, Zagreb	Martin Kegel	Franka Vidović
Czech Republic	March 7–10, 2019	Galerie Harfa, Prague	Daniel Mekbib	Olga Kolářová
Denmark	March 29–31, 2019	Herlev Squash Center, Herlev	Kristian Frost	Line Hansen
Egypt	February 13–17, 2019	Black Ball Sporting Club, New Cairo	Ali Farag	Nour El Tayeb
Estonia	February 9–10, 2019	Tondi Tennis Center, Tallinn	Paavo Piik	Aliis Allas
Finland	February 15–17, 2019	Tali Badminton & Squash Center, Helsinki	Miko Aijänen	Emilia Soini
France	February 15–17, 2019	5 Raquettes Squash Club, Montpellier	Grégoire Marche	Camille Serme
Germany	February 7–10, 2019	Sportwerk Hamburg, Hamburg	Raphael Kandra	Nele Hatschek
Gibraltar	May 28–Jun 6, 2019	The Squash Centre, Gibraltar	Christian Navas	Jessica Gomez
Great Britain	February 14–17, 2019	Nottingham Squash Rackets Club, Nottingham	James Willstrop	Tesni Evans
Greece	April 12–14, 2019	Athens Lawn Tennis Club, Athens	Konstantinos Kargiotis	Elíza Kargióti
Hong Kong	June 10–16, 2019	Hong Kong Football Club, Hong Kong	Leo Au	Annie Au
Hungary	May 31–June 2, 2019	Széchenyi Square, Győr	Balázs Farkas	Chinyere Chukwu
Iceland	April 25–27, 2019	Skvassfélag Reykjavíkur, Reykjavík	Gústaf Smári Björnsson	
India (Dec-2018)	December 13–16, 2018	HCL Technology Hub, Noida	Mahesh Mangaonkar	Joshna Chinappa
India (Jun-2019)	June 10–16, 2019	Amanora Mall, Pune	Mahesh Mangaonkar	Joshna Chinappa
Indonesia	December 16–19, 2018	Siliwangi Squash Center, Bandung	Rahmad Diyanto	
Ireland	February 8–10, 2019	Fitzwilliam Lawn Tennis Club, Dublin	Arthur Gaskin	Sophie O'Rourke
Israel	Nov 27–Dec 6, 2018	Herzliya Squash Center, Herzliya	Roee Avraham	Jackie Goldridge
Italy	May 24–26, 2019	Centro Tecnico Federale FIGS, Riccione	Yuri Farneti	Cristina Tartarone
Jamaica	November 23–25, 2018	The Liguanea Club, Kingston	Christopher Binnie	Akeila Wiltshire
Japan	November 22–25, 2018	Yokohama Squash Stadium (SQ‒CUBE), Yokohama	Ryunosuke Tsukue	Satomi Watanabe
Latvia	November 10–11, 2018	Pepsi Centrs, Riga	Aleksandrs Pāvulāns	Ineta Mackeviča
Liechtenstein	December 1–2, 2018	Squash House Vaduz, Vaduz	David Maier	Nicole Betchem
Lithuania	November 16–18, 2018	SEB Arena, Vilnius	Konrad Tyma	Ruta Grigaitienė
Luxembourg	February 1–2, 2019	CK SportCenter, Kockelscheuer	Mark Radley	Sandra Denis
Macau	December 3–9, 2018	Bowling Centre, Macau	Liu Tsun Man	Liu Kwai Chi
Mexico	April 25–28, 2019	Club Campestre, Aguascalientes City	Arturo Salazar	Diana García
Malaysia	July 16–21, 2019	National Squash Centre, Bukit Jalil	Ivan Yuen	Low Wee Wern
Netherlands	February 7–10, 2019	Frans Otten Stadion, Amsterdam	Piëdro Schweertman	Milou van der Heijden
New Zealand	June 28–30, 2019	National Squash Centre, Auckland	Paul Coll	Joelle King
Norway	June 27–30, 2019	Toppform treningssenter, Røyneberg	Adrian Østbye	Lotte Eriksen
Pakistan (M)	April 30–May 3, 2019	Hashim Khan Squash Complex, Peshawar	Farhan Mehboob	
Pakistan (W)	April 17–20, 2019	Hashim Khan Squash Complex, Peshawar		Muqaddas Ashraf
Poland	June 13–15, 2019	Wrocław Squash Club, Wrocław	Filip Jarota	Karina Tyma
Portugal	June 7–9, 2019	Lisboa Racket Centre, Lisbon	Rui Soares	Catarina Nunes
Romania	February 15–17, 2019	Infinity Sport Arena, Bucharest	Vasile Hapun	Florentina Constantinescu
Russia	February 22–24, 2019	Squash Club Moscow, Moscow	Vladislav Titov	Alesya Aleshina
Scotland	March 1–3, 2019	Edinburgh Sports Club, Edinburgh	Alan Clyne	Lisa Aitken
Serbia	March 1–2, 2019	Belgrade Squash Club, Belgrade	Marko Matanović	Jelena Dutina
Singapore	March 21–24, 2019	Kallang Squash Centre, Singapore	Samuel Kang	Wai Yhann Au Yeong
Slovakia	March 14–16, 2019	Bory Mall Shopping Center, Bratislava	Miroslav Celler	Andrea Malinová
Slovenia	June 1–2, 2019	Squashland Ljubljana, Ljubljana	Martin Mošnik	Nina Kustec
South Africa	June 24–29, 2019	Pretoria Country Club, Pretoria	Jean-Pierre Brits	Milnay Louw
South Korea	April 18–20, 2019	Jeonju Technical College Squash Court, Jeonju	Lee Seung-taek	Kim Ga-hye
Spain	February 8–10, 2019	Cuenca Squash Club, Cuenca	Edmon López	Cristina Gómez
Sweden	January 24–27, 2019	Wasa Club, Stockholm	Rasmus Hult	Moa Bönnemark
Switzerland	March 14–17, 2019	Squash Arena, Uster	Nicolas Müller	Cindy Merlo
Thailand	June 20–23, 2019	Vajiravudh College, Bangkok	Natthakit Jivasuwan	Anantana Prasertratanakul
Turkey	September 26–30, 2018	Altınşehir Gençlik Merkezi, Bursa	Ergin Yörükoğlu	Esma Kabakçı
Ukraine	March 16–17, 2019	Sport Life Teremki, Kyiv	Valeriy Fedoruk	Alina Bushma
United States	March 26–30, 2019	Squash on Fire, Washington	Todd Harrity	Olivia Blatchford Clyne
Wales	March 15–17, 2019	Sport Wales National Centre, Cardiff	Peter Creed	Tesni Evans

== Retirements ==
Following is a list of notable players (winners of a main tour title, and/or part of the PSA Men's World Rankings and Women's World Rankings top 30 for at least one month) who announced their retirement from professional squash, became inactive, or were permanently banned from playing, during the 2018–19 season:

- Omneya Abdel Kawy (born 15 August 1985 in Giza, Egypt) joined the pro tour in 1999, reaching the singles no. 4 spot in October 2010. Reached 32 finals winning 8 WISPA/WSA/PSA titles. 2010 World Championship runner-up losing to Nicol David in the final. Played 474 matches in the professional tour winning 286 (60.33% winning pct). She retired in November 2018 after 19 years on the tour.
- Nafiizwan Adnan (born 24 April 1986 in Terenggenau, Malaysia) turned professional in 2004 and reached a career-high world ranking of no. 26 in May 2017. He reached 24 PSA Tour finals out of 200 total PSA tournaments, winning 11 PSA titles, the last of which came at the Manitoba Open in March 2018. He won 262 matches from a total of 450 at a win rate of 58.2%. In 2018, he won a bronze medal at the 2018 Commonwealth Games on Australia's Gold Coast, beating Nick Matthew in the quarter-finals and Joel Makin in the bronze medal match. He retired in May 2019 after losing to Saurav Ghosal at the quarter-final stage of the Asian Individual Squash Championships.
- Mohammed Reda (born April 16, 1989, in Cairo, Egypt) turned professional in 2005 and reached a career-high world ranking of no. 23 in October 2011. He reached 23 PSA Tour finals out of 178 total PSA tournaments, winning 15 PSA.

== See also ==
- 2018–19 PSA World Tour Finals
- 2019 Men's PSA World Tour Finals
- 2019 Women's PSA World Tour Finals
