= Lily Taylor =

Lily Taylor may refer to:

- Lily Ross Taylor (1886–1969), American academic and author
- Lily Taylor (squash player) (born 1996), English squash player

== See also ==
- Lili Taylor (born 1967), American actress
