= Fabien Verseille =

French squash player (born 1985)

Personal information
- Born: 20 November 1985 (age 40) Aix-en-Provence, France
- Height: 1.84 m (6 ft 0 in)
- Weight: 73 kg (161 lb)

Sport
- Country: France
- Turned pro: 2005
- Coached by: Andre Delhoste
- Retired: Active
- Racquet used: Tecnifibre

Men's singles
- Highest ranking: No. 95 (June 2011)
- Current ranking: No. 400 (November 2018)
- Updated on November 2018

Fabien Verseille (French pronunciation: [veʁsej], born 20 November 1985 in Aix-en-Provence) is a French professional squash player. As of November 2018, he was ranked number 400 in the world and number 15 in France. He won the 2018 Prague Open professional tournament, beating fellow frenchman Christophe André in the final.
