= Shehana Vithana =

Australian squash player (born 1999)

Personal information
- Born: 31 March 1999 (age 27) Colombo, Sri Lanka

Sport
- Turned pro: 2017
- Racquet used: Grays
- Highest ranking: 119 (October 2018)
- Current ranking: 168 (November 2019)
- Updated on November 2019

Shehana Vithana (born 31 March 1999) is a Sri Lankan born Australian professional squash player .She achieved her highest career PSA singles ranking of 119 in October 2018 as a part of the 2018-19 PSA World Tour.

== Biography ==
She was born and raised up in Colombo, Sri Lanka, when she started playing the sport of squash at the age of 9. She studied at the Holy Family Convent in Bambalapitiya till Year 8 when she moved to Sydney, Australia.

== Career ==
Shehana emerged in youth level and became Australia's number one ranked squash player in the U19 category. She won U17 Girl's Squash Championships at the Australian Junior Squash Championships in 2015. She also took part in the 2017 Women's World Junior Squash Championships and World University Championships in 2018. She joined the Professional Squash Association in 2017.
