= Linda Shannon =

South African squash player (born 1969)

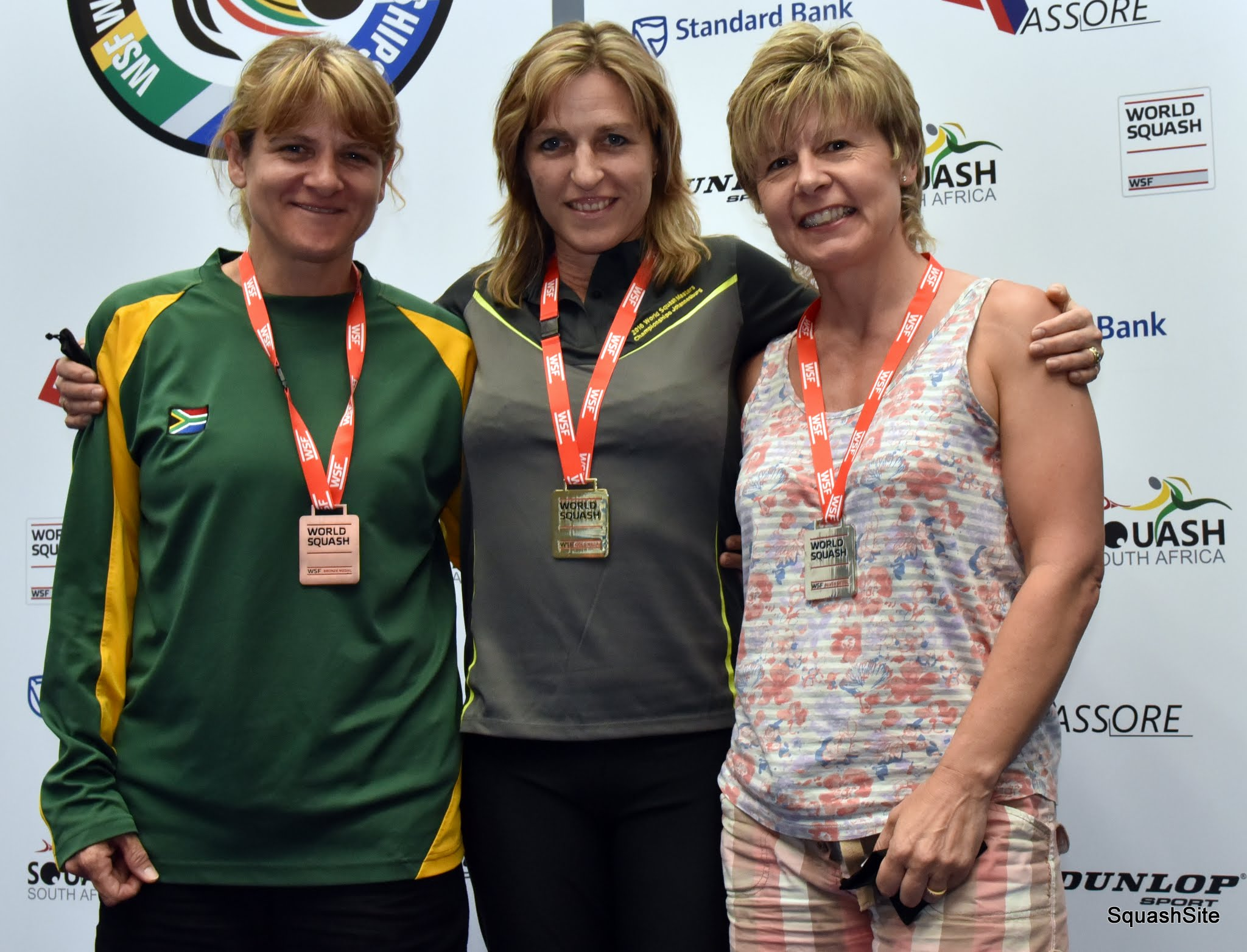
- Linda Shannon (left) along with Australia's Sarah Fitz-Gerald

Personal information
- Born: 25 November 1969 (age 56)

Sport
- Turned pro: 2012
- Updated on February 2020

Linda Shannon (born 1969) is a South African former professional squash player who played for South Africa women's national squash team. Her highest career achievement was reaching quarterfinals of the Growthpoint SA Open during the 2018-19 PSA World Tour.

In August 2024, Shannon fell at the last hurdle at the WSF World Masters Squash Championships when Karen Meakins of Barbados defended her 50+ title against Shannon.
