= Alexa Pienaar =

South African squash player (born 1994)

Personal information
- Born: 10 July 1994 (age 32) Pretoria, South Africa

Sport
- Coached by: Mike Bester
- Racquet used: Technifiber
- Highest ranking: 97 (November 2019)
- Current ranking: 296 (February 2020)
- Updated on February 2020

Alexa Pienaar (born 10 July 1994) is a South African professional squash player who currently plays for South Africa women's national squash team. She achieved her highest career PSA singles ranking of 97 in November 2019. She was runners-up to England's Lily Taylor in the women's singles finals during the 2018 World University Squash Championships.
