= Tour de las Américas de Squash =

The Tour de las Américas de Squash (transl. Squash Tour of the Americas) is part of the PSA World Tour and consists of a series of professional squash tournaments held yearly in Argentina, Paraguay, Brazil and Bolivia.

== 2017 ==
Tournament	Dates	Location	Winner	Runner-up	Score in final
Patagonia Open	26–29 April	Villa La Angostura, Argentina	(Argentina) Robertino Pezzota	(Argentina) Rodrigo Pezzota	11-9, 11-9, 9-11, 11-6
Mar del Plata Open	3–6 May	Mar del Plata, Argentina	(England) Angus Gillams	(France) Christophe André	7-11, 8-11, 11-8, 11-8, 11-8
Regatas Resistencia Open	10–13 May	Resistencia, Argentina	(Argentina) Robertino Pezzota	(United States) Christopher Gordon	11-8, 11-7, 11-4
Paraguay Open	17–20 May	Asunción, Paraguay	(Argentina) Leandro Romiglio	(Canada) Shawn Delierre	11-6, 6-11, 11-5, 11-1
Copa INOB de Squash	21–24 September	Brasília, Brazil	(France) Auguste Dussourd	(Mexico) Leonel Cardenas	4-11, 11-9, 7-11, 11-6, 11-8
Bolivia Open	17–22 October	Cochabamba, Bolivia	(Mexico) Leonel Cardenas	(Colombia) Juan Camilo Vargas	9-11, 11-4, 7-11, 12-10, 11-6

== 2018 ==
Tournament	Dates	Location	Winner	Runner-up	References
Villa La Angostura Open	25–28 April	Villa La Angostura, Argentina	(Argentina) Robertino Pezzota	(Colombia) Edgar Ramírez	
Mar del Plata Open	2–5 May	Mar del Plata, Argentina	(Egypt) Mostafa Asal	(Argentina) Robertino Pezzota	
Regatas Resistencia Open	9–12 May	Resistencia, Argentina	(Egypt) Mostafa Asal	(Switzerland) Dimitri Steinmann	
Paraguay Open	16–19 May	Asunción, Paraguay	(Mexico) Alfredo Ávila	(France) Auguste Dussourd	
Paineiras Open Brasil	24–27 May	São Paulo, Brazil	(Egypt) Mostafa Asal	(France) Victor Crouin	
