= Farah Momen =

Egyptian squash player (born 1990)

Personal information
- Born: 11 July 1990 (age 36) Cairo

Sport
- Racquet used: Black Knight
- Highest ranking: 87 (March 2019)
- Current ranking: 95 (March 2020)
- Updated on March 2020

Farah Momen (born 11 July 1990) is an Egyptian professional squash player who plays for Egypt women's national squash team. She achieved her highest career PSA singles ranking of 87 in March 2019 during the 2018-19 PSA World Tour.
