= Cameron Seth =

Canadian squash player (born 1994)

Personal information
- Born: April 21, 1994 (age 32) Ontario, Canada
- Education: University of Waterloo
- Height: 183 cm (6 ft 0 in)
- Weight: 79 kg (174 lb)

Sport
- Country: Canada
- Handedness: Right Handed
- Coached by: Ravi Seth
- Retired: Active
- Racquet used: Black Knight

Men's singles
- Highest ranking: No. 125 (April 2019)
- Current ranking: No. 140 (May 2019)
- Title: 1
- Updated on May 2019

Cameron Seth (born 21 April 1994 in Ontario) is a Canadian professional squash player. As of May 2019, he was ranked number 140 in the world. He won the 2019 CityView Open.
