= Moqaddas Ashraf =

Pakistani professional squash player

Personal information
- Born: July 27, 1987 (age 38) Lahore
- Weight: 68 kg (150 lb)

Sport
- Country: Pakistan
- Turned pro: 2005
- Coached by: Abdul Rasheed and Yawar Islam
- Racquet used: Dunlop

Women's singles
- Highest ranking: No. 91 (September 2019)
- Current ranking: No. 133 (November 2020)
Medal record
Women's squash
Representing Pakistan
South Asian Games
| Silver medal – second place | 2004 Nepal | Team |
| Silver medal – second place | 2019 Nepal | Team |
| Bronze medal – third place | 2004 Nepal | Individual |
| Bronze medal – third place | 2006 Nepal | Team |
- Updated on November 2020

Moqaddas Ashraf (born 27 July 1987, in Lahore) is a Pakistani professional squash player. As of November 2020, she is ranked number 133 in the world.

== Background ==
Ashraf was born to Mohammad Ashraf on 27 July 1987 in Lahore, Pakistan.

== Career ==
=== National ===
Ashraf represents WAPDA in national competitions. At the National Games held in Peshawar in November 2019, she won silver in the women's team event. She had earlier lost in the singles quarter-finals to eventual winner, Madina Zafar of Pakistan Army.

=== South Asian Games ===
Ashraf was part of the team which competed at the 2004 South Asian Games held in Islamabad, Pakistan. She won a silver medal in the women's team event and bronze in the individual event. In 2006, she was again part of the team which competed at the South Asian Games held in Colombo, Sri Lanka and won a bronze medal in the team event. No women's team was sent to compete at the 2010 South Asian Games while she was not included in the 2016 Games. After a gap of over a decade, in 2019, Ashraf was again part of the team sent to the 2019 South Asian Games held in Kathmandu, Nepal. She won a silver medal in the women's team event.

=== Professional ===
Ashraf turned professional in 2005. She is currently coached by Abdul Rasheed while Yawar Islam had coached her earlier.

In 2018 at the Faletti's International Women's Squash Championship held in Lahore, as an unseeded player in the quarter-finals, she beat fellow countrywoman and the number 1 seed, Madina Zafar by 3 sets to 2 (7-11, 14–12, 6-11, 11–6, 11-7) in 51 minutes. She fell in the semi-finals to number 4 seed of Egypt, Farida Mohamed by 3-0 (6-11, 3-11, 2-11).

2019 saw her compete in a number of professional events including Pakistan International Championships (PIC), Northern Open and Pakistan Circuit no 1. Her best performance came in August when she was runners up to Amma Fayyaz (10-12, 8-11, 10-12) at the Pakistan Circuit no 1 professional tournament held in Islamabad. In April and December she competed at the Pakistan International Championships. In April she reached the quarter-finals while in December she lost in the 2nd round. She also lost in the second round at the Northern Open in UK.

World Ranking
| Year | Best | Worse | Year end |
|---|---|---|---|
| 2005 | 124 (Nov.) | 127 (Dec.) | 127 |
| 2006 | 118 (May/Jun.) | 148 (Dec.) | 148 |
| 2007 | 112 (Dec. | 180 (Aug.) | 112 |
| 2008 | 107 (Jun./Aug.) | 133 (Dec.) | 133 |
| 2009 | 121 (Mar.) | 195 (Dec.) | 195 |
| 2010 | 141 (Aug.) | 170 (Dec.) | 170 |
| 2011 | 203 (Apr.) | 276 (Aug.) | 264 |
| 2012 | 219 (Aug.) | 253 (Jan.) | 227 |
| 2013 | 193 (Apr.) | 230 (Jan.) | 201 |
| 2014 | 167 (Mar.) | 227 (Dec.) | 227 |
| 2015 | 155 (Dec.) | 234 (Jan.) | 155 |
| 2016 | 130 (Apr) | 184 (Dec.) | 184 |
| 2017 | 187 (Jan.) | 231 (Jun.) | No ranking |
| 2018 | 146 (Dec.) | 254 (May) | 146 |
| 2019 | 91 (Sep.) | 126 (Dec.) | 126 |
| 2020 | | | |
