= Mike Corren =

Australian squash player (born 1974)

Personal information
- Born: 28 February 1974 (age 52) Millicent, Australia
- Height: 1.86 m (6 ft 1 in)

Sport
- Country: Australia
- Handedness: Right-handed
- Turned pro: 1994
- Retired: Active
- Racquet used: Stellar

Men's singles
- Highest ranking: No. 38 (February 2004)
- Title: 52
- Tour final: 73
- Updated on July 2016

Mike Corren (born 28 February 1974 in Millicent) is an Australian former professional squash player. He reached a career-high world ranking of World No. 38 in February 2004.
