= Milnay Louw =

South Africa squash player (born 1988)

Personal information
- Born: 6 October 1988 (age 37) Cape Town, South Africa

Sport
- Country: South Africa
- Turned pro: 2007
- Retired: Active
- Racquet used: Dunlop

Women's singles
- Highest ranking: No. 60 (March, 2014)
- Current ranking: No. 84 (November, 2014)
- Updated on November, 2014

Milnay Louw (born October 6, 1988 in Cape Town, South Africa) is a professional squash player who represents South Africa. She reached a career-high national ranking of No. 1 in the country, with three South African National titles. She achieved her highest PSA ranking of No. 60 in March 2014.
