= Connor Sheen =

English squash player (born 1996)

Personal information
- Born: 26 July 1996 (age 30) Liverpool, England

Sport
- Country: England
- Retired: Active
- Racquet used: Head
- Highest ranking: No. 123 (October 2019)
- Current ranking: No. 837 (October, 2023)
- Updated on February, 2018

Connor Sheen (born 26 July 1996 in Liverpool) is a retired English professional squash player best known for his 14-minute defeat by Peter Creed at the British Nationals and for getting bageled (losing a game without winning a single point) by Matthew Hopkins. As of February 2018, he was ranked number 180 in the world.
