= Darren Chan =

Malaysian squash player (born 1996)

Personal information
- Born: September 20, 1996 (age 29) Kuantan, Malaysia
- Height: 161 cm (5 ft 3 in)
- Weight: 61 kg (134 lb)

Sport
- Country: Malaysia
- Retired: Active

Men's singles
- Highest ranking: No. 144 (October 2019)
- Current ranking: No. 144 (October 2019)
- Updated on October 2018

Darren Chan (born 20 September 1996, in Kuantan) is a Malaysian professional squash player. As of October 2019, he was ranked number 144 in the world. He won the 2018 Cairns Squash International professional PSA tournament.
