= Stuart MacGregor (squash player) =

English squash player (born 1998)

Personal information
- Born: 26 June 1998 (age 28) York, England

Sport
- Country: England
- Handedness: Right Handed
- Turned pro: 2016
- Retired: Active

Men's singles
- Highest ranking: No. 129 (July 2019)
- Current ranking: No. 191 (August 2021)
- Updated on August 2021

Stuart MacGregor (born 26 June 1998 in York) is an English professional squash player. As of August 2021, he was ranked number 191 in the world. He won the 2021 NM Academy Open.
