= Mazen Gamal =

Egyptian squash player (born 1986)

Personal information
- Born: 30 January 1986 (age 40) Riyadh, Saudi Arabia
- Education: Mechanical Engineering Cairo University
- Years active: 14
- Height: 190 cm (6 ft 3 in)
- Weight: 86 kg (190 lb)
- Website: https://www.psaworldtour.com/view-player/player/mazen-gamal/

Sport
- Country: Egypt
- Turned pro: 2008
- Retired: Active
- Racquet used: Head Speed 120
- Highest ranking: No. 49 (September 2022)
- Current ranking: No. 49 (October __, 2022)
- Title: 10
- Tour final: 18
- Updated on February, 2018

Mazen Gamal (born 30 January 1986 in Riyadh) is an Egyptian professional squash player. Coached by Karim Darwish, he reached his career-high PSA ranking of World No. 49 in September 2022.
