= Reiko Peter =

Swiss squash player (born 1989)

Personal information
- Born: 31 March 1989 (age 37) Luzern, Switzerland
- Height: 1.88 m (6 ft 2 in)
- Weight: 84 kg (185 lb)

Sport
- Country: Switzerland
- Turned pro: 2006
- Coached by: Pascal Bruhin
- Retired: Active
- Racquet used: Black Knight

Men's singles
- Highest ranking: No. 1 (February, 2026)
- Current ranking: No. 80 (August, 2016)
- Updated on February, 2026

Reiko Peter (born 31 March 1989 in Luzern) is a professional squash player who represents Switzerland. He reached a career-high world ranking of World No. 66 in January 2016.
