= Jesús Camacho =

Mexican squash player (born 1998)

Jesus Camacho
Personal information
- Born: 6 March 1998 (age 28) Mexico City, Mexico

Sport
- Country: Mexico
- Turned pro: 2014
- Retired: Active
- Racquet used: Black Knight

Men's singles
- Highest ranking: No. 68 (July 2018)

Jesus Camacho or Jesús Camacho (born 6 March 1998) is a Mexican professional squash player. He reached a career high ranking of 68 in the world during July 2018.

== Career ==
In 2024, Camacho won his 6th PSA title after securing victory in the Copa Mexico Temazcal during the 2024–25 PSA Squash Tour.
