= Yuri Farneti =

Italian squash player (born 1996)

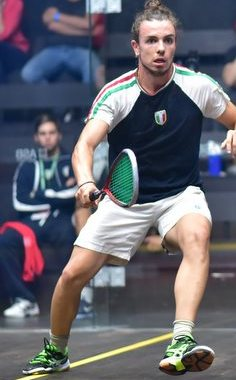

Personal information
- Born: January 3, 1996 (age 30) Angera, Italy
- Height: 178 cm (5 ft 10 in)
- Weight: 70 kg (154 lb)

Sport
- Country: Italy
- Coached by: Marcus Berrett
- Retired: Active
- Racquet used: Dunlop

Men's singles
- Highest ranking: No. 127 (August 2021)
- Current ranking: No. 127 (August 2021)
- Updated on February 2018

Yuri Farneti (born 3 January 1996 in Angera) is an Italian professional squash player. As of February 2018, he was ranked number 170 in the world, and number 1 in Italy. He has played in the main draw of many professional PSA tournaments and competed in the World Games. As of February 2018, he was the highest ranked Italian player.
