= Miko Äijänen =

Finnish squash player (born 1997)

Personal information
- Born: July 18, 1997 (age 29) Järvenpää, Finland
- Height: 188 cm (6 ft 2 in)
- Weight: 75 kg (165 lb)

Sport
- Country: Finland
- Handedness: Right Handed
- Coached by: Sami Elopuro
- Retired: Active
- Racquet used: Tecnifibre

Men's singles
- Highest ranking: No. 107 (April 2019)
- Current ranking: No. 108 (June 2019)
- Updated on June 2019

Miko Äijänen (born 18 July 1997 in Järvenpää) is a Finnish professional squash player. As of December 2019, he was ranked number 91 in the world. He is in the Finnish national team.

On 17 February 2019, Miko Äijänen won gold medal in the Finnish National Championships.
