= Alesya Aleshina =

Russian squash player

Personal information
- Full name: Russian: Але́ся Алёшина
- Born: Nizhny Novgorod, Russia

Sport
- Country: Russia
- Turned pro: 2019
- Retired: Active
- Racquet used: Tecnifibre

Women's singles
- Highest ranking: No. 196 (February 2020)
- Updated on September 2021

Alesya Aleshina (Russian: Але́ся Алёшина, born 2003 in Nizhny Novgorod) is a Russian professional squash player. She reached a career-high ranking of World No. 196 in February 2020. She won the 2021 Women's PSA Squash Tour.
