= Varvara Esina =

Russian squash player (born 2004)

Personal information
- Born: 20 April 2004 (age 22) Nizhny Novgorod, Russia

Sport
- Country: Russia
- Turned pro: 2021
- Retired: Active

Women's singles
- Highest ranking: No. 152 (December 2021)
- Current ranking: No. 152 (December 2021)
- Updated on December 2021

Varvara Esina (born 20 April 2004 in Nizhny Novgorod) is a Russian professional squash player. As of December 2021, she was ranked number 152 in the world. She won the 2021 Moscow Tour.
