= Kristian Frost Olesen =

Danish squash player (born 1989)

Kristian Frost
Personal information
- Full name: Kristian Frost Olesen
- Born: 9 February 1989 (age 37) London, England
- Height: 1.83 m (6 ft 0 in)
- Weight: 74 kg (163 lb)

Sport
- Country: Denmark
- Turned pro: 2007
- Coached by: Francesco Busi
- Retired: Active
- Racquet used: Harrow

Men's singles
- Highest ranking: No. 52 (April 2013)
- Current ranking: No. 116 (July 2017)
- Updated on July 2017

Kristian Frost Olesen (born 9 February 1989 in London), known as Kristian Frost, is a professional squash player who represented Denmark. He reached a career-high world ranking of World No. 52 in April 2013.
