= Mario Yáñez =

Mexican squash player (born 1993)

Personal information
- Full name: Mario Yáñez Tapia
- Born: July 29, 1993 (age 32) Mexico City, Mexico
- Height: 170 cm (5 ft 7 in)
- Weight: 72 kg (159 lb)

Sport
- Country: Mexico
- Coached by: Mario Yanez, Martin Heath
- Retired: Active
- Racquet used: Black Knight

Men's singles
- Highest ranking: No. 82 (November 2019)
- Current ranking: No. 82 (November 2019)
- Title: 1
- Tour final: 2
- Updated on November 2019

Mario Yanez (born 29 July 1993 in Mexico City) is a Mexican professional squash player. As of February 2018, he was ranked number 212 in the world, and number 10 in Mexico. He has competed in and reached the final stages of multiple professional PSA World Tour tournaments.
