= Kace Bartley =

English squash player (born 1997)

Personal information
- Born: 9 July 1997 (age 29) London, England

Sport
- Country: England
- Retired: Active
- Racquet used: Salming

Women's singles
- Highest ranking: No. 82 (June 2018)
- Current ranking: No. 83 (February 2019)
- Updated on February 2019

Kace Bartley (born 9 July 1997 in London) is an English professional squash player. As of February 2018, she was ranked number 93 in the world. She has competed in many professional PSA tournaments and won the 2017 Solent Classic. She has also competed in the Squash Premier League.
