= Jean-Pierre Brits =

South African squash player (born 1991)

Personal information
- Born: 2 April 1991 (age 35) Gauteng, South Africa
- Height: 176 cm (5 ft 9 in)
- Weight: 63 kg (139 lb)

Sport
- Country: South Africa
- Handedness: Right Handed
- Coached by: Craig van der Wath
- Retired: Active
- Racquet used: Prince

Men's singles
- Highest ranking: No. 151 (December 2014)
- Current ranking: No. 208 (April 2018)
Medal record
Men's squash
Representing South Africa
World Doubles Championships
Bronze medal – third place	2019 Carrara	Doubles
- Updated on 13 April 2022

Jean-Pierre Brits (born 2 April 1991 in Gauteng) is a South African professional squash player. As of February 2018, he was ranked number 208 in the world, and number 2 in South Africa. He won the 2018 Gauteng Open professional PSA tournament.
