= Lily Taylor (squash player) =

English squash player

Personal information
- Born: 17 October 1996 (age 29) Leicester, England
- Height: 169 cm (5 ft 7 in)
- Weight: 64 kg (141 lb)

Sport
- Country: England
- Handedness: right handed
- Racquet used: Dunlop
- Highest ranking: 60 (January 2022)
- Current ranking: 60 (January 2022)

Lily Taylor (born 17 October 1996) is an English female squash player who represents England women's national squash team. She reached her highest career rankings of 60 during January 2022.

== Career ==
She emerged through junior level squash competitions after winning the U17 title at the 2013 Dutch Junior Open Squash championship. In 2018, she won the women's singles title at the World University Squash Championships and paired with fellow male compatriot Joshua Masters to win the team event. She also took part at the 2018–19 PSA Women's World Squash Championship which held during February 2019 and was knocked out of the first round of the tournament by Egypt's Nour El Sherbini.
