= Christophe André =

French squash player (born 1987)

Personal information
- Born: 29 May 1987 (age 39) Saint-Pierre, La Réunion, France
- Height: 1.90 m (6 ft 3 in)
- Weight: 88 kg (194 lb)

Sport
- Country: France
- Turned pro: 2013
- Coached by: Thomas Adriaens; Renan Lavigne
- Retired: Active
- Racquet used: Oliver
- Highest ranking: No. 106 (July 2016)
- Current ranking: No. 106 (July 2016)
- Updated on July 2016

Christophe André (born 29 May 1987 in La Réunion) is a professional squash player who represented France. He reached a career-high world ranking of World No. 112 in August 2014.
