= 2020–21 PSA World Tour =

Details
- Event name: PSA World Tour 2020–21
- Dates: August 2020 – July 2021
- Categories: World Championship: Men's/Women's; World Tour Finals: Men's/Women's; PSA Challenger Tour; WSF & PSA Satellite Tour
- Website; PSA World Tour

Achievements
- World Number 1: Men : (Egypt) Mohamed El Shorbagy; Women : (Egypt) Nouran Gohar
- World Champion: Men: (Egypt) Ali Farag; Women: (Egypt) Nour El Sherbini

The 2020–21 PSA World Tour is the international squash tour organised circuit organized by the Professional Squash Association (PSA) for the 2020–21 squash season. It's the 6th PSA season since the merger of PSA and WSA associations in 2015.

The most important tournaments in the series are the Men's and Women's PSA World Championship. The tour also features two circuits of regular events - PSA World Tour (formerly PSA World Series), which feature the highest prize money and the best fields; and PSA Challenger Tour with prize money ranging $5,500–$30,000. In the middle of the year, the PSA World Tour tour is concluded by the Men's and Women's PSA World Tour Finals in Cairo, the season-ending championships for the top 8 rated players from World Tour level tournaments.

== Overview ==
=== PSA World Tour changes ===
Starting in August 2018, PSA revamped its professional tour structure in two individual circuits; PSA World Tour and PSA Challenger Tour.

PSA World Tour (formerly PSA World Series) will comprise most important tournaments in prize money for more experienced and higher-ranked players, including PSA World Championships and PSA World Tour Finals, labelled as following:

- PSA World Tour Platinum — 48-player draws — $165,000
- PSA World Tour Gold — 24-player draws — $97,500–$100,000
- PSA World Tour Silver — 24-player draws — $67,500–$70,000
- PSA World Tour Bronze — 24-player draws — $45,000–$47,500

PSA Challenger Tour tournaments will offer a $6,000–$30,000 prize-money, ideal circuit for less-experienced and upcoming players, that will include the following tiers:

- PSA Challenger Tour 30 — $30,000
- PSA Challenger Tour 20 — $20,000
- PSA Challenger Tour 10 — $12,000
- PSA Challenger Tour 5 — $6,000
- PSA Challenger Tour 3 — $3,000 (starting August 2020)

=== Prize money/ranking points breakdown ===
PSA World Tour events also have a separate World Tour ranking. Points for this are calculated on a cumulative basis after each World Tour event. The top eight players at the end of the calendar year are then eligible to play in the PSA World Tour Finals.

Ranking points vary according to tournament tier being awarded as follows:

| PSA World Tour | | | Ranking Points | | | | | | |
| Rank | Prize money US$ | Ranking Points | Winner | Runner up | 3/4 | 5/8 | 9/16 | 17/32 | 33/48 |
|---|---|---|---|---|---|---|---|---|---|
| Platinum | $165,000 | 19188 points | 2750 | 1810 | 1100 | 675 | 410 | 250 | 152.5 |
| Gold | $97,500–$100,000 | 10660 points | 1750 | 1150 | 700 | 430 | 260 | 160 | |
| Silver | $67,500–$70,000 | 7470 points | 1225 | 805 | 490 | 300 | 182.5 | 112.5 | |
| Bronze | $47,500–$50,000 | 5330 points | 875 | 575 | 350 | 215 | 130 | 80 | |
| PSA World Tour Finals | | | Ranking Points | | | | | | |
| Rank | Prize money US$ | Winner | Runner up | 3/4 | Round-Robin Match Win | Undefeated bonus | | | |
| World Tour Finals | $185,000 | 1000 | 550 | 200 | 150 | 150 | | | |
| PSA Challenger Tour | | | Ranking Points | | | | | | |
| Rank | Prize money US$ | Ranking Points | Winner | Runner up | 3/4 | 5/8 | 9/16 | 17/32 | 33/48 |
| Challenger Tour 30 | $30,000 | 3194 points | 525 | 345 | 210 | 130 | 78 | 47.5 | |
| Challenger Tour 20 | $20,000 | 2112 points | 350 | 230 | 140 | 85 | 51 | 31.5 | |
| Challenger Tour 10 | $12,000 | 1218 points | 200 | 130 | 80 | 50 | 30 | 18 | |
| Challenger Tour 5 | $6,000 | 609 points | 100 | 65 | 40 | 25 | 15 | 9 | |
| PSA World Championships | | | Ranking Points | | | | | | |
| Rank | Prize money US$ | Ranking Points | Winner | Runner up | 3/4 | 5/8 | 9/16 | 17/32 | 33/64 |
| PSA World Championships | $500,000 | 25045 points | 3175 | 2090 | 1270 | 780 | 475 | 290 | 177.5 |

== World Tour halts ==
In mid-March 2020, due to COVID-19 pandemic, The Professional Squash Association was forced to suspend the PSA Tour (World Tour, Challenger Tour and WSF & PSA Satellite Tour) until May. Then, the Tour suspension experienced new extensions first until July and later until September.

PSA Tour return is expected to September 2020.

On 10 September and after a 6-months shut off due to COVID-19, the tour returned to activity with Expression Networks Nolan and Liam's Tournament and Manchester Open.

== Calendar ==
=== Key ===
PSA Tiers
World Championship
World Tour Platinum
World Tour Gold
World Tour Silver
World Tour Bronze
Challenger Tour 3/5/10/20/30

=== August ===
| Tournament | Date | Champion | Runner-Up | Semifinalists | Quarterfinalists |
|---|---|---|---|---|---|
| ~~Squash Melbourne Open~~; Moorabbin, Australia; Men : Challenger 10; 24 players - $12,000 −−−−−− Women : Challenger 10; 24 players - $12,000 | 12–16 August | Events cancelled due to COVID-19 pandemic | | | |
| ~~Life Time Houston Open~~; Houston, United States; Men : Challenger 30; 24 players - $30,000 | 13–17 August | Events cancelled due to COVID-19 pandemic | | | |
| ~~Necker Mauritius Open~~; Grand-Baie, Mauritius; Men : World Tour Gold; 24 players - $100,000 | 18–22 August | Events cancelled due to COVID-19 pandemic | | | |
| ~~North Coast Open~~; Coffs Harbour, Australia; Men : Challenger 5; 24 players - $6,000 −−−−−− Women : Challenger 5; 16 players - $6,000 | 20–23 August | Events cancelled due to COVID-19 pandemic | | | |
| ~~Australian Open~~; Bega, Australia; Men : Challenger 10; 24 players - $12,000 −−−−−− Women : Challenger 10; 24 players - $12,000 | 26–20 August | Events cancelled due to COVID-19 pandemic | | | |

=== September ===
| Tournament | Date | Champion | Runner-Up | Semifinalists | Quarterfinalists |
|---|---|---|---|---|---|
| Expression Networks Nolan & Liam's (Czech Republic) Prague, Czechia; Men : Challenger 10; 24 players - $12,000 | 10–13 September | (France) Grégory Gaultier; 11–5, 11–5, 11–5 (41st PSA title) | (Germany) Raphael Kandra | (Czech Republic) Jakub Solnický (Germany) Valentin Rapp | (Czech Republic) Daniel Mekbib (Austria) Aqeel Rehman (Germany) Yannik Omlor (Colombia) Juan Camilo Vargas |
| Manchester Open; Manchester, England; Men : World Tour Silver; 24 players - $85,000 −−−−−− Women : World Tour Silver; 24 players - $85,000 | 16–22 September | (Egypt) Mohamed El Shorbagy; 9–11, 11–8, 11–7, 13–11 (42nd PSA title) | (Egypt) Karim Abdel Gawad | (New Zealand) Paul Coll (Egypt) Marwan El Shorbagy | (Egypt) Ali Farag (Egypt) Tarek Momen (Wales) Joel Makin (Germany) Simon Rösner |
| Manchester Open; Manchester, England; Men : World Tour Silver; 24 players - $85,000 −−−−−− Women : World Tour Silver; 24 players - $85,000 | 16–22 September | (Egypt) Nour El Tayeb; 3–11, 11–8, 11–7, 11–3 (11th PSA title) | (France) Camille Serme | (Egypt) Hania El Hammamy (England) Sarah-Jane Perry | (New Zealand) Joelle King (United States) Amanda Sobhy (Wales) Tesni Evans (Egypt) Salma Hany |
| Open National Normand; Le Havre, France; Men : WSF/PSA Satellite; 24 players - $2,500 −−−−−− Women : WSF/PSA Satellite; 24 players - $2,500 | 25–27 September | (France) Victor Crouin; 11–9, 6–11, 11–9, 8–11, 14–12 | (France) Lucas Serme | (France) Auguste Dussourd (France) Edwin Clain | (Belgium) Joeri Hapers (France) Vincent Droesbeke (France) Adrien Grondin (France) Johan Bouquet |
| Open National Normand; Le Havre, France; Men : WSF/PSA Satellite; 24 players - $2,500 −−−−−− Women : WSF/PSA Satellite; 24 players - $2,500 | 25–27 September | (France) Énora Villard; 11–5, 12–10, 11–1 | (France) Élise Romba | (Czech Republic) Anna Serme (France) Yuna Loaëc | (France) Léa Barbeau (Slovakia) Ella Gálová (France) Hénora Lanieu (France) Magali Ballatore |
| PSA World Tour Finals 2019–20; Cairo, Egypt; Men : World Tour Finals; 8 players - $185,000 - Draw −−−−−− Women : World Tour Finals; 8 players - $185,000 - Draw | 28 Sep.–3 Oct. | (Egypt) Marwan El Shorbagy; 11–6, 11–5, 11–3 (1st PSA Finals title) (11th PSA title) | (Egypt) Karim Abdel Gawad | (Egypt) Ali Farag (Wales) Joel Makin | (Egypt) Tarek Momen (Peru) Diego Elías (Germany) Simon Rösner (New Zealand) Paul Coll |
| PSA World Tour Finals 2019–20; Cairo, Egypt; Men : World Tour Finals; 8 players - $185,000 - Draw −−−−−− Women : World Tour Finals; 8 players - $185,000 - Draw | 28 Sep.–3 Oct. | (Egypt) Hania El Hammamy; 9–11, 9–11, 11–9, 11–4, 11–3 (1st PSA Finals title) (6th PSA title) | (Egypt) Nour El Tayeb | (New Zealand) Joelle King (Egypt) Nour El Sherbini | (France) Camille Serme (Egypt) Nouran Gohar (United States) Amanda Sobhy (England) Sarah-Jane Perry |

=== October ===
| Tournament | Date | Champion | Runner-Up | Semifinalists | Quarterfinalists |
|---|---|---|---|---|---|
| Les Mirabelles Open; Maxéville, France; Women : WSF/PSA Satellite; 16 players - $2,500 | 3–4 October | (Switzerland) Ambre Allinckx; 11–7, 14–16, 11–8, 11–7 | (Latvia) Ineta Mackeviča | (France) Élise Romba (France) Ninon Lemarchand | (France) Léa Barbeau (France) Taba Taghavi (France) Ana Munos (France) Mahé Asensi |
| CIB Egyptian Squash Open; Cairo, Egypt; Men : World Tour Platinum; 48 players - $270,000 −−−−−− Women : World Tour Platinum; 48 players - $270,000 | 10–17 October | (Egypt) Ali Farag; 11–8, 11–3, 11–4 (20th PSA title) | (Egypt) Tarek Momen | (Egypt) Marwan El Shorbagy (Egypt) Mostafa Asal | (New Zealand) Paul Coll (Peru) Diego Elías (Egypt) Mazen Hesham (France) Grégory Gaultier |
| CIB Egyptian Squash Open; Cairo, Egypt; Men : World Tour Platinum; 48 players - $270,000 −−−−−− Women : World Tour Platinum; 48 players - $270,000 | 10–17 October | (Egypt) Nour El Sherbini; 11–9, 11–9, 11–6 (22nd PSA title) | (Egypt) Nouran Gohar | (Egypt) Hania El Hammamy (Egypt) Nour El Tayeb | (France) Camille Serme (India) Joshna Chinappa (Belgium) Nele Gilis (Egypt) Salma Hany |
| QSF No.3; Doha, Qatar; Men : Challenger 5; 16 players - $6,000 | 18–21 October | (Qatar) Syed Azlan Amjad; 11–3, 11–4, 11–4 (1st PSA title) | (Qatar) Abdulrahman Al-Malki | (Qatar) Waleed Zaman (Qatar) Yousef Farag | (Qatar) Hamad Al-Amri (Qatar) Ibrahim Al-Darwish (Qatar) Salem Al-Malki (Qatar) Yousef Al-Kubaisi |
| Swiss Open; Uster, Switzerland; Men : Challenger 5; 32 players - $6,000 −−−−−− Women : WSF/PSA Satellite; 16 players - $1,000 | 28 Oct.–1 Nov. | (Japan) Ryosei Kobayashi; 11–8, 11–5, 11–7 (4th PSA title) | (Switzerland) Yannick Wilhelmi | (Germany) Yannik Omlor (England) Robert Downer | (Germany) Valentin Rapp (Switzerland) Robin Gadola (France) Edwin Clain (Switzerland) Cédric Kuchen |
| Swiss Open; Uster, Switzerland; Men : Challenger 5; 32 players - $6,000 −−−−−− Women : WSF/PSA Satellite; 16 players - $1,000 | 28 Oct.–1 Nov. | (Switzerland) Cindy Merlo; 7–11, 11–7, 11–8, 11–7 | (Switzerland) Nadia Pfister | (Germany) Aylin Günsav (Germany) Saskia Beinhard | (Switzerland) Leila Hirt (Germany) Stephanie Müller (Germany) Katerina Týcová (Switzerland) Kate Gadola |

=== November ===
| Tournament | Date | Champion | Runner-Up | Semifinalists | Quarterfinalists |
|---|---|---|---|---|---|
| Qatar Classic; Doha, Qatar; Men : World Tour Platinum; 48 players - $175,000 | 1–7 November | (Egypt) Ali Farag; 11–8, 6–11, 11–9, 11–9 (21st PSA title) | (New Zealand) Paul Coll | (Egypt) Tarek Momen (Egypt) Fares Dessouky | (Egypt) Youssef Ibrahim (Peru) Diego Elías (Wales) Joel Makin (Egypt) Marwan El Shorbagy |
| Austrian Open; Salzburg, Austria; Men : Challenger 5; 16 players - $6,000 | 5–8 November | (Hungary) Balázs Farkas; 10–12, 14–12, 11–1, 11–5 (5th PSA title) | (Czech Republic) Daniel Mekbib | (Germany) Yannik Omlor (Austria) Aqeel Rehman | (Czech Republic) Jakub Solnický (Switzerland) Robin Gadola (Germany) Valentin Rapp (Czech Republic) Ondřej Uherka |
| ~~Capra Bærum Open~~; Lysaker, Norway; Men : WSF/PSA Satellite; 24 players - $2,000 −−−−−− Women : WSF/PSA Satellite; 24 players - $2,000 | 13–15 November | Event cancelled due to COVID-19 in Norway | | | |
| ~~SRAM PSA 1~~; Bukit Jalil, Malaysia; Men : Challenger 10; 24 players - $12,000 −−−−−− Women : Challenger 10; 24 players - $12,000 | 18–22 November | Event cancelled due to COVID-19 in Malaysia | | | |
| Liechtenstein Open; Vaduz, Liechtenstein; Men : Challenger 10; 24 players - $12,000 −−−−−− Women : Challenger 10; 16 players - $12,000 | 20–22 November | (Switzerland) Nicolas Müller; 11–4, 11–6, 11–6 (10th PSA title) | (Switzerland) Dimitri Steinmann | (Switzerland) Robin Gadola (Switzerland) Yannick Wilhelmi | (Austria) Aqeel Rehman (Switzerland) Nils Rösch (Switzerland) Miguel Mathis (Switzerland) Cédric Kuchen |
| Liechtenstein Open; Vaduz, Liechtenstein; Men : Challenger 10; 24 players - $12,000 −−−−−− Women : Challenger 10; 16 players - $12,000 | 20–22 November | (Switzerland) Ambre Allinckx; 11–6, 11–5, 11–6 (1st PSA title) | (Switzerland) Céline Walser | (Switzerland) Cindy Merlo (Switzerland) Nadia Pfister | (Switzerland) Cassandra Fitze (Austria) Jacqueline Peychär (Switzerland) Alina Pössl (Switzerland) Jasmin Ballmann |
| BISL International Squash Championship; Quetta, Pakistan; Men : Challenger 10; 16 players - $12,000 −−−−−− Women : Challenger 5; 16 players - $6,000 | 24–28 November | (Pakistan) Tayyab Aslam; 11–2, 8–11, 11–3, 11–7 (9th PSA title) | (Pakistan) Asim Khan | (Pakistan) Amaad Fareed (Pakistan) Danish Atlas Khan | (Pakistan) Nasir Iqbal (Pakistan) Zahir Shah (Pakistan) Waqas Mehboob (Pakistan) Farhan Zaman |
| BISL International Squash Championship; Quetta, Pakistan; Men : Challenger 10; 16 players - $12,000 −−−−−− Women : Challenger 5; 16 players - $6,000 | 24–28 November | (Pakistan) Amna Fayyaz; 11–9, 11–8, 11–8 (2nd PSA title) | (Pakistan) Faiza Zafar | (Pakistan) Moqaddas Ashraf (Pakistan) Madina Zafar | (Pakistan) Noor-ul-Huda (Pakistan) Saima Shoukat (Pakistan) Anam Mustafa Aziz (Pakistan) Rushna Mehboob |
| ~~SRAM PSA 2~~; Bukit Jalil, Malaysia; Men : Challenger 10; 24 players - $12,000 −−−−−− Women : Challenger 10; 24 players - $12,000 | 25–28 November | Event cancelled due to COVID-19 in Malaysia | | | |

=== December ===
| Tournament | Date | Champion | Runner-Up | Semifinalists | Quarterfinalists |
|---|---|---|---|---|---|
| ~~Cognac Open~~; Châteaubernard, France; Men : Challenger 5; 24 players - $6,000 | 2–6 December | Event cancelled due to worsening COVID-19 situation in France | | | |
| ~~Chairman Cup~~; Hong Kong, China; Men : Challenger 10; 16 players - $12,000 −−−−−− Women : Challenger 10; 16 players - $12,000 | 3–6 December | Event postponed on 1 December until further notice due to worsening COVID-19 situation in Hong Kong | | | |
| Sihltal Classic; Zürich, Switzerland; Men : Challenger 10; 24 players - $12,000 −−−−−− Women : Challenger 10; 16 players - $12,000 | 4–6 December | (Switzerland) Dimitri Steinmann; 9–11, 11–2, 11–9, 11–7 (8th PSA title) | (Switzerland) Nicolas Müller | (Switzerland) Cédric Kuchen (Switzerland) Robin Gadola | (Switzerland) Nils Rösch (Switzerland) Miguel Mathis (Switzerland) Yannick Wilhelmi (Switzerland) Jakob Känel |
| Sihltal Classic; Zürich, Switzerland; Men : Challenger 10; 24 players - $12,000 −−−−−− Women : Challenger 10; 16 players - $12,000 | 4–6 December | (Switzerland) Ambre Allinckx; 7–11, 11–7, 11–9, 12–10 (2nd PSA title) | (Switzerland) Cindy Merlo | (Switzerland) Céline Walser (Switzerland) Nadia Pfister | (Switzerland) Cassandra Fitze (Switzerland) Kate Gadola (Switzerland) Jasmin Ballmann (Switzerland) Fabienne Oppliger |
| ~~Open des Bretzels~~; Mulhouse, France; Women : WSF/PSA Satellite; 32 players - $2,350 | 4–6 December | Event postponed/cancelled due to worsening COVID-19 situation in France | | | |
| Pakistan International; Islamabad, Pakistan; Men : Challenger 10; 24 players - $12,000 −−−−−− Women : Challenger 5; 16 players - $6,000 | 7–11 December | (Pakistan) Tayyab Aslam; 11–7, 6–11, 3–11, 12–10, 13–11 (10th PSA title) | (Pakistan) Nasir Iqbal | (Pakistan) Amaad Fareed (Pakistan) Israr Ahmed | (Pakistan) Farhan Hashmi (Pakistan) Asim Khan (Pakistan) Farhan Zaman (Pakistan) Waqas Mehboob |
| Pakistan International; Islamabad, Pakistan; Men : Challenger 10; 24 players - $12,000 −−−−−− Women : Challenger 5; 16 players - $6,000 | 7–11 December | (Pakistan) Madina Zafar; 11–8, 11–1, 2–11, 7–11, 11–9 (2nd PSA title) | (Pakistan) Faiza Zafar | (Pakistan) Amna Fayyaz (Pakistan) Moqaddas Ashraf | (Pakistan) Saima Shoukat (Pakistan) Noor-ul-Huda (Pakistan) Anam Mustafa Aziz (Pakistan) Rushna Mehboob |
| CIB Black Ball Squash Open; New Cairo, Egypt; Women : World Tour Gold; 32 players - $112,500 | 7–12 December | (England) Sarah-Jane Perry; 4–11, 9–11, 11–9, 12–10, 11–9 (11th PSA title) | (Egypt) Hania El Hammamy | (New Zealand) Joelle King (United States) Amanda Sobhy | (Egypt) Nour El Sherbini (Wales) Tesni Evans (France) Camille Serme (Egypt) Nouran Gohar |
| ~~T.H. Quinn Cincinnati Queen City Open~~; Cincinnati, United States; Men : Challenger 10; 24 players - $12,000 | 9–13 December | Event postponed to May 2021 due to the increased number of COVID cases across the US | | | |
| ~~IMET PSA Open~~; Bratislava, Slovakia; Men : Challenger 5; 24 players - $6,000 | 9–13 December | Event cancelled as new measures are enforced against COVID-19 in Slovakia due to worsening situation | | | |
| ~~Open National Set Marseille~~; Marseille, France; Men : WSF/PSA Satellite; 16 players - $2,500 | 11–13 December | Event postponed/cancelled due to worsening COVID-19 situation in France | | | |
| ~~QSF Open~~; Doha, Qatar; Men : Challenger 30; 24 players - $30,000 | 10–14 December | Event cancelled due to the travel restrictions enforced by Qatari government in the fight against COVID-19 | | | |
| CIB Black Ball Squash Open; New Cairo, Egypt; Men : World Tour Gold; 32 players - $112,500 | 13–18 December | (Egypt) Fares Dessouky; 5–11, 8–11, 11–7, 11–8, 11–8 (4th PSA title) | (Egypt) Ali Farag | (Egypt) Tarek Momen (Egypt) Mostafa Asal | (Egypt) Mohamed Abouelghar (Peru) Diego Elías (Wales) Joel Makin (Colombia) Miguel Ángel Rodríguez |
| QSF No.4; Doha, Qatar; Men : Challenger 10; 16 players - $12,000 | 14–20 December | (Qatar) Syed Azlan Amjad; 11–9, 11–5, 11–9 (2nd PSA title) | (Qatar) Abdulrahman Al-Malki | (Qatar) Salem Al-Malki (Qatar) Hamad Al-Amri | (Qatar) Waleed Zaman (Malaysia) Gurshan Singh (Qatar) Ibrahim Darwish (Qatar) Abdulla Al-Tamimi |
| Costa del Sol Open; Fuengirola, Spain; Men : Challenger 10; 16 players - $6,000 | 17–20 December | (Spain) Bernat Jaume; 11–4, 11–7, 11–8 (4th PSA title) | (Spain) Iker Pajares | (Spain) Hugo Varela (Spain) Joel Jaume | (Spain) Sergio García (Spain) Javier Martín (Spain) Iván Pérez (Netherlands) Tess Jutte |
| ~~Bexley Open~~; London, England; Men : Challenger 3; 16 players - $3,000 −−−−−− Women : Challenger 3; 16 players - $3,000 | 19–20 December | Event postponed on 15 December as toughest restrictions against COVID-19 comes into effect in England. | | | |
| PSA Bordeaux Nord; Bordeaux, France; Men : Challenger 10; 24 players - $6,000 | 19–21 December | (France) Victor Crouin; 11–6, 11–8, 11–5 (10th PSA title) | (France) Lucas Serme | (France) Auguste Dussourd (Japan) Ryosei Kobayashi | (France) Manuel Paquemar (France) Joshua Phinéra (France) Edwin Clain (France) Paul Gonzalez |
| Expression Networks Prague Open; Prague, Czech Republic; Men : Challenger 10; 16 players - $6,000 | 21–23 December | (France) Grégory Gaultier; 11–7, 11–6, 11–4 (42nd PSA title) | (Czech Republic) Viktor Byrtus | (Austria) Aqeel Rehman (Czech Republic) Jakub Solnický | (Netherlands) Roshan Bharos (Germany) Yannik Omlor (England) Robert Downer (Czech Republic) Ondřej Vorlíček |
| PSA Open RFESquash; Fuengirola, Spain; Men : Challenger 5; 16 players - $3,000 | 21–23 December | (Spain) Hugo Varela; 11–7, 12–10, 9–11, 11–8 (1st PSA title) | (Spain) Iván Pérez | (Spain) Sergio García (Spain) Augusto Ortigosa | (Netherlands) Tess Jutte (Spain) Nilo Vidal (Spain) Javier Martín (Spain) Marc López |
| Life Time City Center Challenger; Houston, United States; Men : Challenger 3; 16 players - $1,500 | 29–30 December | (United States) Faraz Khan; 12–10, 11–7, 11–13, 11–2 (2nd PSA title) | (United States) Spencer Lovejoy | (United States) Timothy Brownell (Pakistan) Ahsan Ayaz | (Pakistan) Abdul Malik Khan (England) Nick Sutcliffe (United States) Patrick McElroy (Pakistan) Huzaifa Ibrahim |

=== January ===
| Tournament | Date | Champion | Runner-Up | Semifinalists | Quarterfinalists |
|---|---|---|---|---|---|
| Expression Networks Enjoy Open; Bielsko-Biała, Poland; Men : Challenger 10; 16 players - $6,000 | 6–8 January | (France) Grégory Gaultier; 11-6, 11–6, 11-4 (43rd PSA title) | (Egypt) Mazen Gamal | (England) Robert Downer (Czech Republic) Marek Panáček | (Germany) Valentin Rapp (Czech Republic) Ondřej Uherka (Czech Republic) Jakub Solnický (Czech Republic) Viktor Byrtus |
| PSA Squash95 Paris; Saint-Ouen-l'Aumône, France; Women : Challenger 10; 16 players - $6,000 | 8–10 January | (France) Mélissa Alves; 11–8, 11–9, 11–5 (6th PSA title) | (Czech Republic) Anna Serme | (France) Énora Villard (France) Marie Stephan | (France) Élise Romba (France) Kara Lincou (France) Léa Barbeau (France) Ella Gálová |
| ~~Hong Kong Football Club PSA~~; Hong Kong, China; Men : Challenger 10; 16 players - $12,000 −−−−−− Women : Challenger 10; 16 players - $12,000 | 13–16 January | Event postponed/cancelled as toughest restrictions against COVID-19 comes into effect in Hong Kong. | | | |
| Sandgate Open; Deagon, Australia; Women : Challenger 10; 16 players - $6,000 | 19–22 January | (Australia) Tamika Hunt; 11–5, 11–7, 11–5 (10th PSA title) | (Australia) Sarah Cardwell | (Australia) Jessica Turnbull (Malta) Colette Sultana | (Australia) Rachael Grinham (Australia) Selena Shaikh (Australia) Madison Lyon (Australia) Jessica Osborne |
| Czech Pro Series 1 Prague, Czech Republic; Men : Challenger 10; 16 players - $12,000 | 27–29 January | (France) Grégory Gaultier; 11-2, 11–6, 11-3 (44th PSA title) | (Czech Republic) Jakub Solnický | (Czech Republic) Ondřej Uherka (England) Robert Downer | (Czech Republic) Martin Švec (Czech Republic) David Zeman (Czech Republic) Daniel Mekbib (Czech Republic) Marek Panáček |
| PSA Challenger Le Rêve Nancy; Maxéville, France; Men : Challenger 10; 32 players - $6,000 | 29 Jan.–1 Feb. | (France) Victor Crouin; 11–7, 11–1, 11–6 (11th PSA title) | (France) Lucas Serme | (France) Benjamin Aubert (France) Baptiste Masotti | (Japan) Ryosei Kobayashi (Switzerland) Dimitri Steinmann (Spain) Bernat Jaume (France) Sébastien Bonmalais |

=== February ===
| Tournament | Date | Champion | Runner-Up | Semifinalists | Quarterfinalists |
|---|---|---|---|---|---|
| Volkswagen Australian Open; Bega, Australia; Men : Challenger 10; 16 players - $6,000 −−−−−− Women : Challenger 10; 16 players - $6,000 | 4–7 February | (Australia) Rhys Dowling; 11–4, 11–6, 11–8 (2nd PSA title) | (Australia) Joseph White | (Australia) Thomas Calvert (Australia) Nicholas Calvert | (Australia) Peter Vaughan (Australia) Rohan Toole (Australia) Solayman Nowrozi (Australia) Javed Ali |
| Volkswagen Australian Open; Bega, Australia; Men : Challenger 10; 16 players - $6,000 −−−−−− Women : Challenger 10; 16 players - $6,000 | 4–7 February | (Australia) Rachael Grinham; 15–13, 11–9, 7–11, 5–11, 11–8 (36th PSA title) | (Australia) Jessica Turnbull | (Australia) Selena Shaikh (Australia) Sarah Cardwell | (Australia) Tamika Hunt (South Africa) Hannelize Human (Australia) Jessica Osborne (Australia) Alex Haydon |
| Le Havre PSA Challenger; Le Havre, France; Women : Challenger 10; 16 players - $6,000 | 5–7 February | (France) Mélissa Alves; 11–0, 11–8, 11–3 (7th PSA title) | (France) Marie Stephan | (France) Énora Villard (Czech Republic) Anna Serme | (France) Léa Barbeau (France) Fanny Segers (France) Élise Romba (France) Taba Taghavi |
| 1º DSQV Sportwerk Challenger; Hamburg, Germany; Men : Challenger 3; 16 players - $1,500 −−−−−− Women : WSF & PSA Satellite; 8 players - $1,000 | 6–7 February | (Germany) Valentin Rapp; 15–13, 7–11, 11–5, 11–4 (1st PSA title) | (Netherlands) Roshan Bharos | (Germany) Tobias Weggen (Egypt) Tarek Shehata | (Germany) Nils Schwab (Germany) Julius Benthin (Germany) Willi Wingelsdorf (Germany) Lennard Hinrichs |
| 1º DSQV Sportwerk Challenger; Hamburg, Germany; Men : Challenger 3; 16 players - $1,500 −−−−−− Women : WSF & PSA Satellite; 8 players - $1,000 | 6–7 February | (Latvia) Ineta Mackeviča; 8–11, 5–11, 11–2, 12–10, 11–7 | (Germany) Saskia Beinhard | (Czech Republic) Katerina Týcová (Germany) Aylin Günsav | (Germany) Lea-Iris Murrizi (Germany) Lucie Mährle (Germany) Anna Karina Moreno |
| AJ Bell England Squash Championships; Manchester, England; Men : Unranked; 12 players - $4,000 −−−−−− Women : Unranked; 10 players - $4,000 | 9–12 February | (England) Declan James; 11–7, 9–11, 12–10, 11–6 | (England) George Parker | (England) Nick Wall (England) Richie Fallows | (England) Charlie Lee (England) James Willstrop (England) Patrick Rooney (England) Miles Jenkins |
| AJ Bell England Squash Championships; Manchester, England; Men : Unranked; 12 players - $4,000 −−−−−− Women : Unranked; 10 players - $4,000 | 9–12 February | (England) Sarah-Jane Perry; 11–8, 11–7, 11–5 | (England) Georgina Kennedy | (England) Jasmine Hutton (England) Julianne Courtice | (England) Millie Tomlinson (England) Grace Gear (England) Lucy Beecroft (England) Kace Bartley |
| ~~Open des Bretzels~~; Mulhouse, France; Women : Challenger 10; 24 players - $6,000 | 12–14 February | Event postponed/cancelled due to a player testing positive for COVID-19 24-hours before the tournament start. | | | |
| BISL Southern Punjab International; Multan, Pakistan; Men : Challenger 10; 16 players - $6,000 −−−−−− Women : Challenger 10; 16 players - $6,000 | 11–15 February | (Pakistan) Nasir Iqbal; 9–10, rtd (11th PSA title) | (Pakistan) Asim Khan | (Pakistan) Syed Ali Mujtaba (Pakistan) Israr Ahmed | (Pakistan) Amaad Fareed (Pakistan) Waqas Mehboob (Pakistan) Zahir Shah (Pakistan) Danish Atlas Khan |
| BISL Southern Punjab International; Multan, Pakistan; Men : Challenger 10; 16 players - $6,000 −−−−−− Women : Challenger 10; 16 players - $6,000 | 11–15 February | (Pakistan) Madina Zafar; 11–3, 11–4, 11–5 (3rd PSA title) | (Pakistan) Zaynab Khan | (Pakistan) Noor-ul-Ain Ijaz (Pakistan) Noor-ul-Huda | (Pakistan) Anam Mustafa Aziz (Pakistan) Saima Shoukat (Pakistan) Rushna Mehboob (Pakistan) Fehmina Asim |
| ~~SRAM PSA 1~~; Bukit Jalil, Malaysia; Men : Challenger 10; 24 players - $12,000 −−−−−− Women : Challenger 10; 24 players - $12,000 | 17–20 February | Event cancelled due to the implementation of Movement Control Order in Kuala Lumpur and another five states. | | | |
| Henderson Rochelle Hobbs Open; Henderson, New Zealand; Men : Challenger 5; 16 players - $3,000 −−−−−− Women : WSF & PSA Satellite; 16 players - $1,000 | 19–21 February | (New Zealand) Evan Williams; 9–11, 10–12, 16–14, 11–8, 11–1 (7th PSA title) | (New Zealand) Joel Arscott | (New Zealand) Lance Beddoes (New Zealand) Elijah Thomas | (New Zealand) Temwa Chileshe (New Zealand) Lwamba Chileshe (New Zealand) Sion Wiggin (New Zealand) Finn Trimble |
| Henderson Rochelle Hobbs Open; Henderson, New Zealand; Men : Challenger 5; 16 players - $3,000 −−−−−− Women : WSF & PSA Satellite; 16 players - $1,000 | 19–21 February | (New Zealand) Emma Millar; 10–12, 11–4, 11–9, 9–11, 12–10 | (New Zealand) Shelley Kitchen | (New Zealand) Lana Harrison (New Zealand) Lauren Clarke | (New Zealand) Ella Lash (New Zealand) Grace Hymers (New Zealand) Katie Templeton (New Zealand) Sophie Hodges |
| ~~TM Sports Tour 1~~; Cairo, Egypt; Men : Challenger 10; 24 players - $6,000 −−−−−− Women : Challenger 10; 24 players - $6,000 | 19–23 February | Event cancelled due to concerns related to COVID-19 in Egypt. | | | |
| ~~SRAM PSA 2~~; Bukit Jalil, Malaysia; Men : Challenger 10; 24 players - $6,000 −−−−−− Women : Challenger 10; 24 players - $6,000 | 24–27 February | Event cancelled due to the implementation of Movement Control Order in Kuala Lumpur and another five states. | | | |
| Commemoration of the Martyrs of the IRIN; Tehran, Iran; Men : Challenger 5; 24 players - $3,000 | 25–27 February | (Iran) Sajjad Zareeian; 14–12, 11–6, 11–7 (2nd PSA title) | (Iran) Sami Ghasedabadi | (Iran) Seyed Seyyedan (Iran) Mohammad Kashani | (Iran) Amin Ataei (Iran) Navid Maleksabet (Iran) Sepehr Etemadpoor (Iran) Pouya Shafieifard |
| Life Time City Center Open; Houston, United States; Men : Challenger 10; 24 players - $6,000 | 25–28 February | (United States) Shahjahan Khan; 11–4, 11–2, 11–7 (5th PSA title) | (United States) Spencer Lovejoy | (England) Lyell Fuller (United States) Faraz Khan | (Colombia) Matías Knudsen (United States) Timothy Brownell (England) Charlie Johnson (France) Lucas Rousselet |
| Squash Colombia Challenger; Bogotá, Colombia; Men : Challenger 5; 16 players - $3,000 | 25–28 February | (Colombia) Juan Camilo Vargas; 11–3, 11–2, 11–6 (5th PSA title) | (Colombia) Edgar Ramírez | (Colombia) Ronald Palomino (Colombia) Andrés Herrera | (Colombia) Felipe Tovar (Colombia) Juan Pablo Gómez (Colombia) Juan José Torres (Colombia) Mateo Restrepo |
| Cognac Open; Châteaubernard, France; Men : Challenger 10; 16 players - $6,000 | 26–28 February | (France) Victor Crouin; 11–7, 11–8, 8–11, 11–6 (12th PSA title) | (France) Lucas Serme | (Japan) Ryosei Kobayashi (France) Sébastien Bonmalais | (France) Toufik Mekhalfi (France) Manuel Paquemar (France) Edwin Clain (France) Quint Mandil |
| ~~Match Point Squash Open~~; Cairo, Egypt; Men : Challenger 5; 32 players - $3,000 −−−−−− Women : Challenger 5; 32 players - $3,000 | 25 Feb.–2 Mar. | Event cancelled due to concerns related to COVID-19 in Egypt. | | | |

=== March ===
| Tournament | Date | Champion | Runner-Up | Semifinalists | Quarterfinalists |
|---|---|---|---|---|---|
| ~~Barfoot & Thompson Auckland Open~~; Auckland, New Zealand; Men : Challenger 10; 16 players - $6,000 −−−−−− Women : Challenger 5; 16 players - $3,000 | 4–7 March | Event postponed due to Auckland's region moving to level 3, with all squash facilities being closed. | | | |
| 2º DSQV Sportwerk Challenger; Hamburg, Germany; Men : Challenger 5; 24 players - $3,000 −−−−−− Women : Challenger 3; 8 players - $1,500 | 5–7 March | (Germany) Raphael Kandra; 11–6, 11–2, 11–2 (14th PSA title) | (Germany) Yannik Omlor | (Germany) Valentin Rapp (Netherlands) Roshan Bharos | (Egypt) Tarek Shehata (Germany) Norman Junge (Germany) Tobias Weggen (Germany) Carsten Schoor |
| 2º DSQV Sportwerk Challenger; Hamburg, Germany; Men : Challenger 5; 24 players - $3,000 −−−−−− Women : Challenger 3; 8 players - $1,500 | 5–7 March | (Germany) Saskia Beinhard; 11–7, 7–11, 11–3, 14–12 (1st PSA title) | (Czech Republic) Katerina Týcová | (Germany) Lea-Iris Murrizi (Germany) Aylin Günsav | (Germany) Lucie Mährle (Germany) Anna Karina Moreno (Germany) Mai-Ly Nguyễn (Germany) Laura Rödig |
| Zarbaf Farahan Squash Tournament; Tehran, Iran; Men : Challenger 5; 24 players - $3,000 | 10–12 March | (Iran) Sajjad Zareeian; 11–3, 6–11, 11–8, 11–8 (3rd PSA title) | (Iran) Mohammad Kashani | (Iran) Navid Maleksabet (Iran) Amin Ataei | (Iran) Amir Feizpoor (Iran) Alireza Shameli (Iran) Sami Ghasedabadi (Iran) Sepehr Etemadpoor |
| ~~SRAM PSA 3~~; Bukit Jalil, Malaysia; Men : Challenger 5; 24 players - $6,000 −−−−−− Women : Challenger 5; 24 players - $6,000 | 10–13 March | Event cancelled due to the implementation of Movement Control Order in Kuala Lumpur and another five states. | | | |
| 2º Sylvester Trophy; Uster, Switzerland; Men : Challenger 5; 24 players - $3,000 | 11–14 March | (Japan) Ryosei Kobayashi; 11–5, 11–8, 7–11, 11–3 (5th PSA title) | (Germany) Valentin Rapp | (Austria) Aqeel Rehman (Switzerland) Robin Gadola | (Switzerland) Cédric Kuchen (Switzerland) Yannick Wilhelmi (Switzerland) Miguel Mathis (Switzerland) Nils Rösch |
| Arch Delahunty EBOP Open; Whakatāne, New Zealand; Men : WSF & PSA Satellite; 16 players - $4,300 −−−−−− Women : WSF & PSA Satellite; 16 players - $4,300 | 12–14 March | (New Zealand) Temwa Chileshe; 3–2 (games) | (New Zealand) Lwamba Chileshe | (New Zealand) Ben Grindrod (New Zealand) Zac Millar | (New Zealand) Finn Trimble (New Zealand) Mason Smales (New Zealand) Glenn Templeton (New Zealand) Joe Smythe |
| Arch Delahunty EBOP Open; Whakatāne, New Zealand; Men : WSF & PSA Satellite; 16 players - $4,300 −−−−−− Women : WSF & PSA Satellite; 16 players - $4,300 | 12–14 March | (New Zealand) Amanda Landers-Murphy; 3–0 (games) | (New Zealand) Lauren Clarke | (New Zealand) Winona-Jo Joyce (New Zealand) Abbie Palmer | (New Zealand) Katie Templeton (New Zealand) Crystal Tahata (New Zealand) Kaitlyn Watts (New Zealand) Camden Kani-McQueen |
| Squashberek Open; Tatabánya, Hungary; Men : Challenger 5; 16 players - $3,000 −−−−−− Women : Challenger 3; 8 players - $1,500 | 13–14 March | (Hungary) Balázs Farkas; 11–5, 11–6, 11–5 (6th PSA title) | (Hungary) Benedek Takács | (Hungary) Simon Dániel (Hungary) Bendegúz Kamocsai | (Hungary) Dávid Boros (Hungary) Simon Nagy (Hungary) Lénárd Püski (Hungary) Roland Makra |
| Squashberek Open; Tatabánya, Hungary; Men : Challenger 5; 16 players - $3,000 −−−−−− Women : Challenger 3; 8 players - $1,500 | 13–14 March | (Hungary) Hannah Chukwu; 11–5, 11–9, 11–5 (1st PSA title) | (Hungary) Csenge Kiss-Máté | (Hungary) Nóra Szalai (Hungary) Sára Nagy | (Hungary) Gabriella Csókási (Hungary) Fatime Farkas (Hungary) Rita Dohány (Hungary) Eszter Harmath |
| CIB Black Ball Squash Open; New Cairo, Egypt; Women : World Tour Platinum; 48 players - $175,000 | 12–18 March | (Egypt) Nour El Sherbini; 13–11, 11–5, 6–11, 11–7 (23rd PSA title) | (United States) Amanda Sobhy | (Egypt) Salma Hany (New Zealand) Joelle King | (France) Camille Serme (England) Sarah-Jane Perry (Egypt) Hania El Hammamy (United States) Olivia Clyne |
| Egyptian Challenger Tour #1; Cairo, Egypt; Men : Challenger 5; 32 players - $3,000 −−−−−− Women : Challenger 5; 32 players - $3,000 | 15–19 March | (Egypt) Moustafa El Sirty; 14–12, 11–5, 11–7 (4th PSA title) | (Egypt) Yahya Elnawasany | (Egypt) Yassin El Shafei (Egypt) Mohamed Hassan | (Egypt) Hazem Helmy (Egypt) Aly Hussein (Egypt) Khaled Labib (Egypt) Shady El Sherbiny |
| Egyptian Challenger Tour #1; Cairo, Egypt; Men : Challenger 5; 32 players - $3,000 −−−−−− Women : Challenger 5; 32 players - $3,000 | 15–19 March | (Egypt) Fayrouz Aboelkheir; 11–7, 7–11, 11–8, 11–8 (1st PSA title) | (Egypt) Malak Khafagy | (Egypt) Hana Moataz (Egypt) Nour Aboulmakarim | (Egypt) Nardine Garas (Egypt) Haya Ali (Egypt) Menna Walid (Egypt) Nada Ehab |
| Chairman Cup; Hong Kong, China; Men : Challenger 10; 16 players - $12,000 −−−−−− Women : Challenger 10; 16 players - $12,000 | 17–20 March | (Hong Kong) Wong Chi Him; 5–11, 11–7, 11–7, 4–11, 11–5 (7th PSA title) | (Hong Kong) Alex Lau | (Hong Kong) Yip Tsz Fung (Hong Kong) Henry Leung | (Hong Kong) Chung Yat Long (Hong Kong) To Wai Lok (Hong Kong) Harley Lam (Hong Kong) Ho Ka Hei |
| Chairman Cup; Hong Kong, China; Men : Challenger 10; 16 players - $12,000 −−−−−− Women : Challenger 10; 16 players - $12,000 | 17–20 March | (Hong Kong) Liu Tsz Ling; 11–6, 11–9, 11–7 (12th PSA title) | (Hong Kong) Ho Tze-Lok | (Hong Kong) Chan Sin Yuk (Hong Kong) Tong Tsz Wing | (Hong Kong) Lee Ka Yi (Hong Kong) Vanessa Chu (Hong Kong) Miriam Min-Chen Cheng (Hong Kong) Mariko Tam |
| Moreton Bay PSA Satellite; Kippa-Ring, Australia; Men : WSF & PSA Satellite; 32 players - $1,400 −−−−−− Women : WSF & PSA Satellite; 16 players - $1,400 | 18–21 March | (Malaysia) Bryan Lim Tze Kang; 11–6, 8–11, 11–5, 11–7 | (Australia) Nicholas Calvert | (Australia) Brad Freeme (Australia) Solayman Nowrozi | (Australia) Thomas Calvert (Malta) Kijan Sultana (Australia) Caleb Johnson (Australia) Cameron Darton |
| Moreton Bay PSA Satellite; Kippa-Ring, Australia; Men : WSF & PSA Satellite; 32 players - $1,400 −−−−−− Women : WSF & PSA Satellite; 16 players - $1,400 | 18–21 March | (Australia) Jessica Turnbull; 5–11, 11–8, 11–6, 11–2 | (Australia) Tamika Hunt | (Australia) Rachael Grinham (Australia) Sarah Cardwell | (Australia) Alex Haydon (Malta) Colette Sultana (Australia) Madison Lyon (Australia) Jessica Osborne |
| Ladies Swiss Open; Uster, Switzerland; Women : Challenger 10; 24 players - $6,000 | 19–21 March | (Switzerland) Cindy Merlo; 11–7, 8–11, 11–6, 11–5 (1st PSA title) | (France) Énora Villard | (France) Marie Stephan (France) Taba Taghavi | (Switzerland) Nadia Pfister (France) Lea Barbeau (Austria) Jacqueline Peychär (France) Élise Romba |
| Royal Oak Open; Royal Oak, Auckland, New Zealand; Men : WSF & PSA Satellite; 16 players - $1,000 −−−−−− Women : Challenger 3; 16 players - $1,500 | 19–21 March | (New Zealand) Lwamba Chileshe; 11–7, 6–11, 9–11, 11–3, 11–6 | (New Zealand) Willz Donnelly | (New Zealand) Zac Millar (New Zealand) Elijah Thomas | (New Zealand) Joel Arscott (New Zealand) Apa Fatialofa Jr. (New Zealand) Gabe Yam (New Zealand) Mason Smales |
| Royal Oak Open; Royal Oak, Auckland, New Zealand; Men : WSF & PSA Satellite; 16 players - $1,000 −−−−−− Women : Challenger 3; 16 players - $1,500 | 19–21 March | (New Zealand) Kaitlyn Watts; 8–11, 11–8, 7–11, 12–10, 11–1 (1st PSA title) | (New Zealand) Emma Millar | (New Zealand) Lana Harrison (New Zealand) Rebecca Barnett | (New Zealand) Jena Gregory (New Zealand) Juee Bhide (New Zealand) Abbie Palmer (New Zealand) Dora Galloway |
| Squash Eredivisie - Speelronde 3 Amstelveen, Netherlands; Men : Challenger 3; 16 players - $1,500 | 20–21 March | (Belgium) Joeri Hapers; 11–6, 11–2, 11–5 (1st PSA title) | (Netherlands) Marc ter Sluis | (Netherlands) Rowan Damming (Netherlands) Rene Mijs | (Netherlands) Sebastiaan Hofman (Netherlands) Luke Stauffer (Netherlands) Tjeu Dubbeldam (Netherlands) Sam Gerrits |
| CIB Black Ball Squash Open; New Cairo, Egypt; Men : World Tour Platinum; 48 players - $175,000 | 19–25 March | (Egypt) Marwan El Shorbagy; 11–7, 11–9, 7–11, 14–12 (12th PSA title) | (Egypt) Fares Dessouky | (Wales) Joel Makin (Egypt) Tarek Momen | (New Zealand) Paul Coll (Egypt) Ali Farag (Egypt) Mohamed El Shorbagy (Egypt) Zahed Salem |
| Morrinsville Open; Morrinsville, New Zealand; Men : Challenger 3; 16 players - $1,500 | 25–27 March | (New Zealand) Lwamba Chileshe; 11–9, 11–8, 6–11, 11–7 (1st PSA title) | (New Zealand) Temwa Chileshe | (New Zealand) Joel Arscott (New Zealand) Zac Millar | (New Zealand) Willz Donnelly (New Zealand) Gabe Yam (New Zealand) Finn Trimble (New Zealand) Mason Smales |
| Gympie PSA Satellite; Gympie, Australia; Men : WSF & PSA Satellite; 16 players - $1,300 −−−−−− Women : WSF & PSA Satellite; 8 players - $1,300 | 25–28 March | (Malaysia) Bryan Lim Tze Kang; 11–2, 7–11, 11–9, 11–5 | (Australia) Solayman Nowrozi | (Australia) Nicholas Calvert (Australia) Joseph White | (Australia) James Lloyd (Australia) Thomas Calvert (Australia) Riley Steffen (Australia) Cameron Darton |
| Gympie PSA Satellite; Gympie, Australia; Men : WSF & PSA Satellite; 16 players - $1,300 −−−−−− Women : WSF & PSA Satellite; 8 players - $1,300 | 25–28 March | (Australia) Tamika Hunt; 5–11, 11–8, 11–9, 9–11, 8–11 | (Australia) Jessica Turnbull | (Australia) Rachael Grinham (Australia) Alex Haydon | (Australia) Sarah Cardwell (Australia) Madison Lyon (Australia) Natalie Newton |
| Open des Bretzels; Mulhouse, France; Women : Challenger 10; 24 players - $6,000 | 26–28 March | (France) Énora Villard; 11–9, 11–2, 11–2 (3rd PSA title) | (Hungary) Hannah Chukwu | (Spain) Cristina Gómez (France) Marie Stephan | (Switzerland) Cindy Merlo (Switzerland) Nadia Pfister (Latvia) Ineta Mackeviča (Spain) Sofía Mateos |
| Annecy Lake Open; Seynod, France; Men : Challenger 5; 24 players - $3,000 | 26–28 March | (France) Toufik Mekhalfi; 8–11, 11–2, 11–9, 11–4 (1st PSA title) | (France) Joshua Phinéra | (France) Melvil Scianimanico (France) Laouenan Loaëc | (France) Quint Mandil (France) Macéo Lévy (France) Antoine Riehl (France) Rohan Mandil |
| Open Squash Aguadulce; Aguadulce, Spain; Men : Challenger 5; 16 players - $3,000 | 26–28 March | (Spain) Iván Pérez; 11–8, 12–10, 11–6 (1st PSA title) | (Spain) Hugo Varela | (Spain) Javier Martín (Colombia) Luis Alejandro Mancilla | (Spain) Pablo Quintana (Spain) Enrique González (Spain) Augusto Ortigosa (Spain) Arón Astray |
| 2º HCL SRFI Indian Tour – Chennai Leg 1 Chennai, India; Men : Challenger 20; 24 players - $20,000 −−−−−− Women : Challenger 10; 24 players - $12,000 | 29 Mar.–2 Apr. | (United States) Todd Harrity; 11–9, 11–6, 7–11, 2–11, 11–0 (4th PSA title) | (India) Mahesh Mangaonkar | (India) Abhay Singh (Egypt) Karim El Hammamy | (Egypt) Yahya Elnawasany (Egypt) Moustafa El Sirty (Egypt) Aly Hussein (Egypt) Mazen Gamal |
| 2º HCL SRFI Indian Tour – Chennai Leg 1 Chennai, India; Men : Challenger 20; 24 players - $20,000 −−−−−− Women : Challenger 10; 24 players - $12,000 | 29 Mar.–2 Apr. | (Egypt) Hana Moataz; 11–3, 11–9, 11–5 (2nd PSA title) | (Egypt) Malak Kamal | (Egypt) Rana Ismail (India) Tanvi Khanna | (India) Sunayna Kuruvilla (India) Sachika Balvani (India) Aparajitha Balamurukan (India) Sanika Choudhari |

=== April ===
| Tournament | Date | Champion | Runner-Up | Semifinalists | Quarterfinalists |
|---|---|---|---|---|---|
| AJ Bell England Squash Super 8 Manchester, England; Men : Invitational; 8 players - $n/a −−−−−− Women : Invitational; 8 players - $n/a | 7–9 April | (England) Patrick Rooney; 11–4, 11–3, 11–8 | (England) Declan James | (England) George Parker (3rd place) (England) Nick Wall (4th place) (England) Charlie Lee (5th place) (England) Daryl Selby (6th place) | |
| AJ Bell England Squash Super 8 Manchester, England; Men : Invitational; 8 players - $n/a −−−−−− Women : Invitational; 8 players - $n/a | 7–9 April | (England) Sarah-Jane Perry; 11–4, 11–9, 11–4 | (England) Georgina Kennedy | (England) Julianne Courtice (3rd place) (England) Alison Waters (4th place) (England) Lucy Beecroft (5th place) (England) Lucy Turmel (6th place) | |
| SOAP Engineering Open; Houston, United States; Women : Challenger 10; 16 players - $6,000 | 7–10 April | (Poland) Karina Tyma; 8–11, 11–7, 11–9, 11–6 (1st PSA title) | (France) Julia Le Coq | (England) Margot Prow (United States) Haley Mendez | (Ukraine) Alina Bushma (Pakistan) Amna Fayyaz (Malaysia) Vanessa Raj (India) Akanksha Salunkhe |
| Life Time Plano International Open; Plano, United States; Men : Challenger 10; 24 players - $6,000 | 8–11 April | (Mexico) Leonel Cárdenas; 11–7, 14–12, 11–8 (9th PSA title) | (United States) Faraz Khan | (United States) Spencer Lovejoy (England) Nathan Lake | (United States) Timothy Brownell (Pakistan) Ahsan Ayaz (Botswana) Alister Walker (Colombia) Matías Knudsen |
| Egyptian Challenger Tour #2; Cairo, Egypt; Men : Challenger 5; 32 players - $3,000 −−−−−− Women : Challenger 5; 32 players - $3,000 | 8–12 April | (Egypt) Yahya Elnawasany; 11–9, 11–8, 11–7 (2nd PSA title) | (Egypt) Moustafa El Sirty | (Egypt) Yassin El Shafei (Egypt) Aly Hussein | (Egypt) Khaled Labib (Egypt) Abdalah El Masry (Iraq) Mohamed Hassan (Egypt) Mohamed Nasser |
| Egyptian Challenger Tour #2; Cairo, Egypt; Men : Challenger 5; 32 players - $3,000 −−−−−− Women : Challenger 5; 32 players - $3,000 | 8–12 April | (Egypt) Sana Ibrahim w/o (2nd PSA title) | (Egypt) Kenzy Ayman | (Egypt) Hana Moataz (Egypt) Jana Shiha | (Egypt) Fayrouz Aboelkheir (Egypt) Rana Ismail (Egypt) Salma El Tayeb (Egypt) Nour Aboulmakarim |
| SRAM PSA 1 Bukit Jalil, Malaysia; Men : Challenger 10; 24 players - $6,000 −−−−−− Women : Challenger 10; 24 players - $6,000 | 9–12 April | (Malaysia) Ivan Yuen; 16–14, 9–11, 11–3, 11–5 (12th PSA title) | (Malaysia) Mohd Syafiq Kamal | (Malaysia) Addeen Idrakie (Malaysia) Elvinn Keo | (Malaysia) Darren Rahul Pragasam (Malaysia) Siow Yee Xian (Malaysia) Ong Sai Hung (Malaysia) Adam Agan Aziz |
| SRAM PSA 1 Bukit Jalil, Malaysia; Men : Challenger 10; 24 players - $6,000 −−−−−− Women : Challenger 10; 24 players - $6,000 | 9–12 April | (Malaysia) Aifa Azman; 11–9, 11–5, 11–8 (8th PSA title) | (Malaysia) Ooi Kah Yan | (Malaysia) Rachel Arnold (Malaysia) Low Wee Wern | (Malaysia) Yee Xin Ying (Malaysia) Chan Yiwen (Malaysia) Ainaa Amani (Malaysia) Aika Azman |
| Czech Pro Series 2 Prague, Czech Republic; Men : Challenger 10; 16 players - $6,000 | 14–16 April | (England) Robert Downer; 5–11, 11–7, 11–4, 11–7 (1st PSA title) | (Czech Republic) Martin Švec | (Austria) Aqeel Rehman (Germany) Yannik Omlor | (Czech Republic) Viktor Byrtus (Czech Republic) Ondřej Uherka (Czech Republic) Jakub Solnický (Czech Republic) Ondřej Vorlíček |
| CoDep94 Val de Marne International; Créteil, France; Women : Challenger 10; 24 players - $6,000 | 16–18 April | (Spain) Cristina Gómez; 7–11, 11–5, 9–11, 14–12, 11–9 (1st PSA title) | (Latvia) Ineta Mackeviča | (France) Marie Stephan (Switzerland) Nadia Pfister | (Germany) Katerina Týcová (France) Fanny Segers (Germany) Saskia Beinhard (France) Léa Barbeau |
| 3º DSQV Sportwerk Challenger; Hamburg, Germany; Men : Challenger 3; 16 players - $1,500 −−−−−− Women : Challenger 3; 8 players - $1,500 | 24–25 April | (Germany) Yannik Omlor; 11–8, 10–12, 11–5, 11–8 (1st PSA title) | (Netherlands) Roshan Bharos | (Egypt) Tarek Shehata (Germany) Tobias Weggen | (Germany) Fynn Schuck (Germany) Julius Benthin (Germany) Dennis Welte (Germany) Christoph Bluhm |
| 3º DSQV Sportwerk Challenger; Hamburg, Germany; Men : Challenger 3; 16 players - $1,500 −−−−−− Women : Challenger 3; 8 players - $1,500 | 24–25 April | (Latvia) Ineta Mackeviča; 11–9, 11–2, 11–9 (1st PSA title) | (Germany) Saskia Beinhard | (Germany) Katerina Týcová (Germany) Lea-Iris Murrizi | (Germany) Lisa Seidensticker (Germany) Laura Goulding (Germany) Mai-Ly Nguyễn (Germany) Annika Lübbert |
| Western Province Open; Rondebosch, South Africa; Men : Challenger 3; 16 players - $1,500 −−−−−− Women : Challenger 3; 16 players - $1,500 | 27–30 April | (South Africa) Dewald van Niekerk; 7–11, 11–4, 9–11, 11–7, 11–7 (1st PSA title) | (South Africa) Christo Potgieter | (South Africa) Jean-Pierre Brits (South Africa) Joshua van der Wath | (South Africa) Tristan Worth (South Africa) Ruan Olivier (Zimbabwe) Blessing Muhwati (South Africa) Gary Wheadon |
| Western Province Open; Rondebosch, South Africa; Men : Challenger 3; 16 players - $1,500 −−−−−− Women : Challenger 3; 16 players - $1,500 | 27–30 April | (South Africa) Lizelle Muller; 11–9, 13–11, 11–4 (1st PSA title) | (South Africa) Jenny Preece | (South Africa) Teagan Roux (South Africa) Taryn Emslie | (South Africa) Tayla Diepenbroek (South Africa) Makgosi Peloakgosi (South Africa) Mariske Wiese (South Africa) Bongi Seroto |
| Life Time San Antonio 281 Open; San Antonio, United States; Men : Challenger 10; 24 players - $6,000 | 29 Apr.–2 May | (Mexico) Leonel Cárdenas; 11–8, 11–6, 11–6 (10th PSA title) | (England) Nathan Lake | (United States) Faraz Khan (Mexico) Alfredo Ávila | (Malaysia) Asyraf Azan (Botswana) Alister Walker (United States) Spencer Lovejoy (Nigeria) Babatunde Ajagbe |
| Archi Factory Open Lorient; Larmor-Plage, France; Men : Challenger 5; 24 players - $3,000 | 29 Apr.–2 May | (Switzerland) Yannick Wilhelmi; 11–9, 11–8, 10–12, 11–3 (1st PSA title) | (Switzerland) Robin Gadola | (Germany) Valentin Rapp (Spain) Iván Pérez | (France) Toufik Mekhalfi (France) Manuel Paquemar (France) Laouenan Loaëc (France) Edwin Clain |
| Waikato Open; Hamilton, New Zealand; Men : Challenger 3; 16 players - $1,500 −−−−−− Women : Challenger 3; 16 players - $1,500 | 30 Apr.–2 May | (New Zealand) Evan Williams; 11–7, 11–7, 4–11, 11–6 (8th PSA title) | (New Zealand) Temwa Chileshe | (New Zealand) Lwamba Chileshe (New Zealand) Willz Donnelly | (New Zealand) Zac Millar (New Zealand) Joel Arscott (New Zealand) Sion Wiggin (New Zealand) Glenn Templeton |
| Waikato Open; Hamilton, New Zealand; Men : Challenger 3; 16 players - $1,500 −−−−−− Women : Challenger 3; 16 players - $1,500 | 30 Apr.–2 May | (New Zealand) Kaitlyn Watts; 9–11, 11–9, 7–11, 11–3, 11–8 (2nd PSA title) | (New Zealand) Emma Millar | (New Zealand) Abbie Palmer (New Zealand) Natalie Sayes | (New Zealand) Lauren Clarke (New Zealand) Winona-Jo Joyce (New Zealand) Tracey Kimble (New Zealand) Sophie Hodges |

=== May ===
| Tournament | Date | Champion | Runner-Up | Semifinalists | Quarterfinalists |
|---|---|---|---|---|---|
| Japan PSA Satellite Series Vol.1; Yokohama, Japan; Men : Challenger 3; 16 players - $1,500 −−−−−− Women : WSF & PSA Satellite; 8 players - $1,500 | 2–3 May | (Japan) Ryūnosuke Tsukue; 11–5, 11–1, 11–7 (2nd PSA title) | (Japan) Naoki Hayashi | (Japan) Naoki Sone (Japan) Shota Yasunari | (Japan) Kato Shoki (Japan) Kosei Toki (Japan) Yuta Kiyosawa (Japan) Tomomine Murayama |
| Japan PSA Satellite Series Vol.1; Yokohama, Japan; Men : Challenger 3; 16 players - $1,500 −−−−−− Women : WSF & PSA Satellite; 8 players - $1,500 | 2–3 May | (Japan) Satomi Watanabe; 11–2, 11–2, 11–6 | (Japan) Akari Midorikawa | (Japan) Kurumi Takahashi (Japan) Chinatsu Matsui | (Japan) Risa Sugimoto (Japan) Ayaka Matsuzawa (Japan) Ayumi Watanabe (Japan) Yukino Sakurai |
| Chairman Cup #2; Hong Kong, China; Men : Challenger 10; 16 players - $6,000 −−−−−− Women : Challenger 10; 16 players - $6,000 | 5–8 May | (Hong Kong) Yip Tsz Fung; 11–9, 9–11, 11–8, 11–6 (6th PSA title) | (Hong Kong) Alex Lau | (Hong Kong) Max Lee (Hong Kong) Henry Leung | (Hong Kong) Andes Ling (Hong Kong) Matthew Lai (Hong Kong) Harley Lam (Hong Kong) Wong Chi Him |
| Chairman Cup #2; Hong Kong, China; Men : Challenger 10; 16 players - $6,000 −−−−−− Women : Challenger 10; 16 players - $6,000 | 5–8 May | (Hong Kong) Chan Sin Yuk; 11–6, 13–11, 11–9 (1st PSA title) | (Hong Kong) Vanessa Chu | (Hong Kong) Liu Tsz Ling (Hong Kong) Lee Ka Yi | (Hong Kong) Ho Tze-Lok (Hong Kong) Tong Tsz Wing (Hong Kong) Cheng Nga Ching (Hong Kong) Toby Tse |
| North Coast Open; Coffs Harbour, Australia; Men : Challenger 3; 16 players - $1,500 −−−−−− Women : Challenger 3; 16 players - $1,500 | 7–9 May | (Malaysia) Bryan Lim Tze Kang; 11–7, 13–15, 3–11, 11–5, 11–3 (1st PSA title) | (Australia) Nicholas Calvert | (Australia) Joseph White (Australia) Rhys Dowling | (Australia) Rohan Toole (Australia) Thomas Calvert (Australia) Jack Hudson (Australia) Solayman Nowrozi |
| North Coast Open; Coffs Harbour, Australia; Men : Challenger 3; 16 players - $1,500 −−−−−− Women : Challenger 3; 16 players - $1,500 | 7–9 May | (Australia) Jessica Turnbull; 11–7, 7–11, 11–6, 7–11, 11–7 (5th PSA title) | (Australia) Tamika Hunt | (Australia) Alex Haydon (Australia) Christine Nunn | (Australia) Remashree Muniandy (Australia) Heather Pilley (Australia) Maggy Marshall (Australia) Kate Winters |
| Panmure Tecnifibre Open; Panmure, New Zealand; Men : Challenger 5; 16 players - $3,000 −−−−−− Women : Challenger 3; 16 players - $1,500 | 14–16 May | (New Zealand) Evan Williams; 11–4, 10–12, 11–6, 5–11, 11–6 (9th PSA title) | (New Zealand) Lwamba Chileshe | (New Zealand) Temwa Chileshe (New Zealand) Joel Arscott | (New Zealand) Sion Wiggin (New Zealand) Finn Trimble (Australia) Benjamin Ratcliffe (New Zealand) Zac Millar |
| Panmure Tecnifibre Open; Panmure, New Zealand; Men : Challenger 5; 16 players - $3,000 −−−−−− Women : Challenger 3; 16 players - $1,500 | 14–16 May | (New Zealand) Kaitlyn Watts; 11–6, 11–7, 11–4 (3rd PSA title) | (New Zealand) Emma Millar | (New Zealand) Ella Lash (New Zealand) Abbie Palmer | (New Zealand) Winona-Jo Joyce (New Zealand) Sophie Hodges (New Zealand) Maiden-Lee Coe (New Zealand) Grace Hymers |
| Open de Mulhouse; Mulhouse, France; Men : Challenger 5; 24 players - $3,000 | 14–16 May | (Japan) Ryosei Kobayashi; 13–11, 11–4, 11–5 (6th PSA title) | (France) Sébastien Bonmalais | (Switzerland) Yannick Wilhelmi (Hungary) Balázs Farkas | (Germany) Valentin Rapp (England) Robert Downer (Switzerland) Robin Gadola (Spain) Iván Pérez |
| Czech Pro Series 3 Prague, Czech Republic; Men : Challenger 5; 16 players - $3,000 | 19–21 May | (Czech Republic) Jakub Solnický; 11–8, 4–11, 5–11, 11–6, 13–11 (1st PSA title) | (Czech Republic) Martin Švec | (England) Robert Downer (Czech Republic) Viktor Byrtus | (Czech Republic) Marek Panáček (Czech Republic) Ondrej Vorlíček (Czech Republic) David Zeman (Germany) Heiko Schwarzer |
| ~~SRAM PSA 2~~; Bukit Jalil, Malaysia; Men : Challenger 5; 24 players - $3,000 −−−−−− Women : Challenger 5; 24 players - $3,000 | 19–22 May | Event cancelled due to the entry into force of a nationwide Movement Control Order from May 12 until June 7. | | | |
| Assurance Financial Austin-South Open; Austin, United States; Men : Challenger 10; 24 players - $6,000 | 20–23 May | (United States) Faraz Khan; 12–10, 11–4, 14–12 (3rd PSA title) | (United States) Timothy Brownell | (United States) Christopher Gordon (Malaysia) Asyraf Azan | (United States) Spencer Lovejoy (Colombia) Matías Knudsen (Botswana) Alister Walker (Mexico) Alfredo Ávila |
| AS Insurance Pontefract Ladies Challenger; Pontefract, England; Women : Challenger 3; 16 players - $1,500 | 21–23 May | (England) Alicia Mead; 11–9, 11–7, 11–9 (1st PSA title) | (England) Torrie Malik | (Scotland) Georgia Adderley (England) Grace Gear | (England) Katie Wells (England) Grace Clark (Scotland) Katriona Allen (England) Charlotte Jagger |
| DSQV Sportwerk Series: Esche Cup; Hamburg, Germany; Men : Challenger 5; 32 players - $3,000 −−−−−− Women : Challenger 3; 16 players - $1,500 | 22–24 May | (Germany) Valentin Rapp; 11–9, 11–9, 11–3 (2nd PSA title) | (Netherlands) Roshan Bharos | (Germany) Carsten Schoor (Germany) Yannik Omlor | (Germany) Julius Benthin (Egypt) Tarek Shehata (Germany) Tobias Weggen (Germany) Willi Wingelsdorf |
| DSQV Sportwerk Series: Esche Cup; Hamburg, Germany; Men : Challenger 5; 32 players - $3,000 −−−−−− Women : Challenger 3; 16 players - $1,500 | 22–24 May | (Netherlands) Milou van der Heijden; 11–4, 11–7, 11–5 (9th PSA title) | (Germany) Saskia Beinhard | (Germany) Katerina Týcová (Germany) Aylin Günsav | (Netherlands) Naomi Nohar (Austria) Jacqueline Peychär (France) Ella Gálová (Germany) Lucie Mährle |
| El Gouna International Squash Open; El Gouna, Egypt; Men : World Tour Platinum; 48 players - $181,500 - Draw −−−−−− Women : World Tour Platinum; 48 players - $181,500 - Draw | 20–28 May | (Egypt) Mohamed El Shorbagy; 11–5, 11–2, 11–7 (43rd PSA title) | (New Zealand) Paul Coll | (Egypt) Fares Dessouky (Egypt) Tarek Momen | (Wales) Joel Makin (Egypt) Mostafa Asal (Egypt) Karim Abdel Gawad (France) Grégoire Marche |
| El Gouna International Squash Open; El Gouna, Egypt; Men : World Tour Platinum; 48 players - $181,500 - Draw −−−−−− Women : World Tour Platinum; 48 players - $181,500 - Draw | 20–28 May | (Egypt) Nour El Sherbini; 11–7, 11–8, 11–5 (24th PSA title) | (Egypt) Nouran Gohar | (Egypt) Hania El Hammamy (United States) Amanda Sobhy | (Egypt) Rowan Elaraby (France) Camille Serme (Egypt) Salma Hany (England) Sarah-Jane Perry |
| Kish Yasi Cup; Kish Island, Iran; Men : Challenger 5; 24 players - $3,000 | 26–28 May | (Iran) Alireza Shameli; 11–8, 11–4, 12–10 (1st PSA title) | (Iran) Navid Maleksabet | (Iran) Sami Ghasedabadi (Iran) Sepehr Etemadpoor | (Iran) Mohammad Kashani (Iran) Pouya Shafieifard (Iran) Mohammad Khani (Iran) Soheil Shameli |
| Assore & Balwin Johannesburg Open; Johannesburg, South Africa; Men : Challenger 5; 24 players - $3,000 −−−−−− Women : Challenger 5; 24 players - $3,000 | 25–29 May | (South Africa) Dewald van Niekerk; 11–7, 11–2, 5–11, 11–3 (2nd PSA title) | (South Africa) Jean-Pierre Brits | (South Africa) Damian Groenewald (South Africa) Joshua van der Wath | (Zambia) Kundanji Kalengo (South Africa) Sipho Ncube (South Africa) Gary Wheadon (South Africa) Ruan Olivier |
| Assore & Balwin Johannesburg Open; Johannesburg, South Africa; Men : Challenger 5; 24 players - $3,000 −−−−−− Women : Challenger 5; 24 players - $3,000 | 25–29 May | (South Africa) Lizelle Muller; 15–13, 11–4, 11–7 (2nd PSA title) | (South Africa) Jenny Preece | (South Africa) Teagan Roux (South Africa) Shelomi Truter | (South Africa) Tayla Diepenbroek (South Africa) Makgosi Peloakgosi (South Africa) Panashe Sithole (South Africa) Kimberley McDonald |
| Barfoot & Thompson Auckland Open; North Shore, New Zealand; Men : Challenger 10; 24 players - $6,000 −−−−−− Women : Challenger 5; 16 players - $3,000 | 27–30 May | (New Zealand) Evan Williams; 9–11, 13–11, 15–13, 11–13, 14–12 (10th PSA title) | (New Zealand) Temwa Chileshe | (New Zealand) Joel Arscott (New Zealand) Lwamba Chileshe | (Australia) Rhys Dowling (Australia) Joseph White (New Zealand) Finn Trimble (Australia) Nicholas Calvert |
| Barfoot & Thompson Auckland Open; North Shore, New Zealand; Men : Challenger 10; 24 players - $6,000 −−−−−− Women : Challenger 5; 16 players - $3,000 | 27–30 May | (Australia) Jessica Turnbull; 11–9, 9–11, 11–3, 11–6 (6th PSA title) | (Australia) Sarah Cardwell | (New Zealand) Emma Millar (New Zealand) Lana Harrison | (New Zealand) Kaitlyn Watts (Australia) Alex Haydon (New Zealand) Abbie Palmer (New Zealand) Ella Lash |
| NT Open; Darwin, Australia; Men : Challenger 3; 16 players - $1,500 | 28–30 May | (Malaysia) Bryan Lim Tze Kang; 11–3, 11–3, 11–6 (2nd PSA title) | (Australia) Lachlan Coxsedge | (Australia) David Turner (Australia) James Lloyd | (Australia) Jamie Pattison (Australia) William Curtis (Australia) Dylan Molinaro (Australia) Doug Black |
| Moscow Challenger; Moscow, Russia; Men : Challenger 3; 16 players - $1,500 | 29–30 May | (Russia) Vladislav Titov; 11–6, 3–11, 14–12, 11–9 (1st PSA title) | (Russia) Makar Esin | (Russia) Petr Smekhov (Russia) Mikhail Skurikhin | (Russia) Alexander Rozhanskiy (Russia) Alexander Beloborodov (Russia) Igor Sivkov (Kazakhstan) Kairat Baidauletov |
| R.D.I. Polska Enjoy Open #1; Bielsko-Biała, Poland; Men : Challenger 3; 16 players - $1,500 | 29–30 May | (Israel) Daniel Poleshchuk; 11–6, 11–5, 11–6 (3rd PSA title) | (Poland) Jakub Pytlowany | (Poland) Filip Jarota (Poland) Jakub Gogol | (Poland) Kajetan Lipski (Poland) Przemysław Atras (Poland) Nataniel Hernas (Poland) Wojciech Gorczycki |

=== June ===
| Tournament | Date | Champion | Runner-Up | Semifinalists | Quarterfinalists |
|---|---|---|---|---|---|
| Salzburg Open; Salzburg, Austria; Men : Challenger 5; 16 players - $3,000 | 4–5 June | (Austria) Aqeel Rehman; 11–9, 11–5, 11–5 (11th PSA title) | (Austria) Jakob Dirnberger | (Austria) Lukas Windischberger (Austria) Georg Stoißer | (Austria) Patrick Strobl (Austria) Mathias Ebenberger (Austria) Stefan Moser (Austria) Daniel Lutz |
| Atlanta Open; Sandy Springs, United States; Men : Challenger 10; 24 players - $6,000 | 2–6 June | (United States) Faraz Khan; 11–9, 11–2, 11–7 (4th PSA title) | (United States) Christopher Gordon | (United States) Spencer Lovejoy (Jamaica) Christopher Binnie | (England) Mark Broekman (Mexico) Allan Núñez (Mexico) Alejandro Reyes (Mexico) Miled Zarazúa |
| Life Time Women's International Open; Houston, United States; Women : Challenger 10; 24 players - $6,000 | 3–6 June | (Poland) Karina Tyma; 11–9, 11–5, 11–5 (2nd PSA title) | (Malaysia) Wen Li Lai | (Canada) Nicole Bunyan (United States) Marina Stefanoni | (Malaysia) Vanessa Raj (Ukraine) Alina Bushma (Pakistan) Amna Fayyaz (India) Kriti Muthu |
| City of Kalgoorlie Boulder Golden Open; Kalgoorlie, Australia; Men : WSF & PSA Satellite; 16 players - $2,250 −−−−−− Women : WSF & PSA Satellite; 8 players - $2,250 | 5–6 June | (Australia) Mike Corren; 11–7, 11–7, 12–10 | (Australia) William Curtis | (Australia) Oscar Curtis (Australia) David Ilich | (Australia) Remi Young (Australia) Dylan Classen (Australia) Lewis Christie (Australia) Jason Patmore |
| City of Kalgoorlie Boulder Golden Open; Kalgoorlie, Australia; Men : WSF & PSA Satellite; 16 players - $2,250 −−−−−− Women : WSF & PSA Satellite; 8 players - $2,250 | 5–6 June | (Australia) Sarah Cardwell; 11–5, 11–6, 11–8 | (Australia) Erin Classen | (Australia) Pascale Louka (Singapore) Joannah Yue | (Australia) Leigh-Anne Kaye (Australia) Isabella Diver (Australia) Hannah Slyth (Australia) Linda Towill |
| AnyósPark Open; Anyós, Andorra; Men : Challenger 5; 32 players - $3,000 | 7–11 June | (France) Sébastien Bonmalais; 9–11, 11–9, 13–11, 11–5 (4th PSA title) | (Scotland) Rory Stewart | (France) Toufik Mekhalfi (Spain) Hugo Varela | (France) Edwin Clain (Spain) Nilo Vidal (Spain) Iván Pérez (Spain) Sergio García |
| Northland Open; Whangārei, New Zealand; Men : Challenger 5; 16 players - $3,000 −−−−−− Women : WSF & PSA Satellite; 8 players - $1,000 | 11–13 June | (New Zealand) Lwamba Chileshe; 11–7, 12–14, 11–7, 11–7 (2nd PSA title) | (New Zealand) Temwa Chileshe | (New Zealand) Willz Donnelly (New Zealand) Sion Wiggin | (New Zealand) Elijah Thomas (Australia) Damon Macmillan (New Zealand) Glenn Templeton (New Zealand) R-J Vette-Blomquist |
| Northland Open; Whangārei, New Zealand; Men : Challenger 5; 16 players - $3,000 −−−−−− Women : WSF & PSA Satellite; 8 players - $1,000 | 11–13 June | (New Zealand) Abbie Palmer; 8–11, 5–11, 11–9, 11–8, 11–5 | (New Zealand) Shelley Kitchen | (New Zealand) Crystal Tahata (New Zealand) Sacha Pou-Tito | (New Zealand) Ella Lash (New Zealand) Annmarie Holst (New Zealand) Chelsea Traill (New Zealand) Cindy Hassan |
| Ramadan Cup; Tehran, Iran; Men : Challenger 5; 24 players - $3,000 | 11–14 June | (Iran) Alireza Shameli; 11–9, 11–4, 11–2 (2nd PSA title) | (Iran) Navid Maleksabet | (Iran) Soheil Shameli (Iran) Sami Ghasedabadi | (Iran) Mohammad Kashani (Iran) Sepehr Etemadpoor (Iran) Faryad Sharifian (Iran) A Hossein Sadegkhani |
| R.D.I. Polska Enjoy Open #2; Bielsko-Biała, Poland; Men : Challenger 3; 16 players - $1,500 | 15–16 June | (Israel) Daniel Poleshchuk; 11–3, 11–1, 11–7 (4th PSA title) | (Poland) Filip Jarota | (Poland) Jakub Gogol (Poland) Jakub Pytlowany | (Poland) Kajetan Lipski (Poland) Wojciech Gorczycki (Poland) Przemysław Atras (Poland) Nataniel Hernas |
| Sumner Malik Memorial; Crawley, England; Men : Challenger 10; 16 players - $6,000 −−−−−− Women : Challenger 3; 16 players - $1,500 | 15–17 June | (England) Richie Fallows; 11–7, 12–14, 11–2, 11–4 (8th PSA title) | (England) Ben Coleman | (England) Joe Lee (Portugal) Rui Soares | (England) Harry Falconer (England) Curtis Malik (England) Connor Sheen (England) Miles Jenkins |
| Sumner Malik Memorial; Crawley, England; Men : Challenger 10; 16 players - $6,000 −−−−−− Women : Challenger 3; 16 players - $1,500 | 15–17 June | (England) Georgina Kennedy; 11–3, 11–3, 11–2 (1st PSA title) | (England) Grace Gear | (England) Alicia Mead (England) Torrie Malik | (Pakistan) Faiza Zafar (Finland) Emilia Korhonen (Netherlands) Sanne Veldkamp (England) Grace Clark |
| Squash Colombia Challenger #2; La Calera, Colombia; Men : Challenger 5; 16 players - $3,000 | 15–18 June | (Colombia) Ronald Palomino; 11–5, 14–16, 11–6, 11–7 (1st PSA title) | (Colombia) Edgar Ramírez | (Colombia) Andrés Herrera (Colombia) Felipe Tovar | (Colombia) Joaquín Fernández (Colombia) Nicolás Serna (Colombia) Juan José Torres (Colombia) José Santamaría |
| Odense Open (QE); Odense, Denmark; Men : Challenger 5; 24 players - $6,000 −−−−−− Women : Challenger 5; 16 players - $6,000 | 15–19 June | (Egypt) Aly Hussein; 11–5, 11–8, 11–6 (1st PSA title) | (Hungary) Balázs Farkas | (Egypt) Moustafa El Sirty (Egypt) Yahya Elnawasany | (Japan) Ryosei Kobayashi (United States) Faraz Khan (Egypt) Aly Abou Eleinen (Colombia) Juan Camilo Vargas |
| Odense Open (QE); Odense, Denmark; Men : Challenger 5; 24 players - $6,000 −−−−−− Women : Challenger 5; 16 players - $6,000 | 15–19 June | (Spain) Cristina Gómez; 11–4, 11–7, 10–12, 11–7 (2nd PSA title) | (Egypt) Nour Aboulmakarim | (England) Lily Taylor (Hungary) Hannah Chukwu | (Mexico) Diana García (Poland) Karina Tyma (Scotland) Georgia Adderley (Scotland) Alison Thomson |
| Hong Kong Football Club PSA; Hong Kong, China; Men : Challenger 10; 16 players - $6,000 −−−−−− Women : Challenger 10; 16 players - $6,000 | 16–19 June | (Hong Kong) Yip Tsz Fung; 11–9, 11–5, 11–7 (7th PSA title) | (Hong Kong) Henry Leung | (Hong Kong) Alex Lau (Hong Kong) Tang Ming Hong | (Hong Kong) Max Lee (Hong Kong) Harley Lam (Hong Kong) Wong Chi Him (Hong Kong) Matthew Lai |
| Hong Kong Football Club PSA; Hong Kong, China; Men : Challenger 10; 16 players - $6,000 −−−−−− Women : Challenger 10; 16 players - $6,000 | 16–19 June | (Hong Kong) Chan Sin Yuk; 11–4, 11–7, 7–11, 10–12, 11–9 (2nd PSA title) | (Hong Kong) Tong Tsz Wing | (Hong Kong) Vanessa Chu (Hong Kong) Ho Tze-Lok | (Hong Kong) Liu Tsz Ling (Hong Kong) Lee Ka Yi (Hong Kong) Cheng Nga Ching (Hong Kong) Wai Sze Wing |
| Pontefract Ladies Challenger #2; Pontefract, England; Women : Challenger 3; 16 players - $1,500 | 18–20 June | (England) Georgina Kennedy; 11–1, 11–6, 11–2 (2nd PSA title) | (England) Anna Kimberley | (England) Torrie Malik (England) Alicia Mead | (England) Charlotte Jagger (Wales) Emily Whitlock (England) Katie Wells (Netherlands) Sanne Veldkamp |
| Open des Allumées; Sautron, France; Women : WSF & PSA Satellite; 16 players - $2,200 | 19–20 June | (France) Ella Gálová; 11–7, 11–7, 12–10 | (France) Fanny Segers | (France) Ana Munos (France) Ninon Lemarchand | (France) Rose Lucas-Marcuzzo (France) Lilou Brévard-Belliot (France) Axelle Legrand (France) Johanna Pigeat |
| CIB PSA World Tour Finals; Cairo, Egypt; Men : World Tour Finals; 8 players - $185,000 - Draw −−−−−− Women : World Tour Finals; 8 players - $185,000 - Draw | 22–27 June | (Egypt) Mostafa Asal; 12–14, 11–4, 11–7, 11–3 (5th PSA title) (1st PSA World Tour Finals title) | (Egypt) Mohamed El Shorbagy | (Egypt) Tarek Momen (New Zealand) Paul Coll | (Egypt) Marwan El Shorbagy (France) Grégoire Marche (Egypt) Ali Farag (Wales) Joel Makin |
| CIB PSA World Tour Finals; Cairo, Egypt; Men : World Tour Finals; 8 players - $185,000 - Draw −−−−−− Women : World Tour Finals; 8 players - $185,000 - Draw | 22–27 June | (Egypt) Nouran Gohar; 11–9, 11–6, 8–11, 11–8 (10th PSA title) (1st PSA World Tour Finals title) | (Egypt) Hania El Hammamy | (France) Camille Serme (New Zealand) Joelle King | (Egypt) Nour El Sherbini (England) Sarah-Jane Perry (Egypt) Salma Hany (United States) Amanda Sobhy |
| ~~SRAM PSA 3~~; Kuala Lumpur, Malaysia; Men : Challenger 10; 24 players - $6,000 −−−−−− Women : Challenger 10; 24 players - $6,000 | 24–27 June | Event cancelled due to the Movement Control Order extended until June 28. | | | |
| Bexley Open; London, England; Men : Challenger 3; 16 players - $1,500 −−−−−− Women : Challenger 3; 16 players - $1,500 | 25–27 June | (England) Joe Lee; 11–6, 10–12, 11–4, 11–6 (5th PSA title) | (Wales) Elliott Morris Devred | (England) Joshua Masters (England) Curtis Malik | (England) Miles Jenkins (England) Harry Falconer (England) Anthony Rogal (Wales) Peter Creed |
| Bexley Open; London, England; Men : Challenger 3; 16 players - $1,500 −−−−−− Women : Challenger 3; 16 players - $1,500 | 25–27 June | (England) Jasmine Hutton; 11–5, 11–4, 11–7 (3rd PSA title) | (England) Grace Gear | (England) Alicia Mead (England) Torrie Malik | (Scotland) Katriona Allen (England) Emma Bartley (Finland) Emilia Korhonen (Italy) Bruna Marchesi |
| Squash on Fire Open; Washington, D.C., United States; Men : Challenger 20; 24 players - $20,000 −−−−−− Women : Challenger 20; 24 players - $20,000 | 27 Jun.–1 Jul. | (France) Victor Crouin; 11–5, 11–13, 11–7, 11–8 (13th PSA title) | (England) James Willstrop | (Japan) Ryosei Kobayashi (Mexico) Leonel Cárdenas | (United States) Spencer Lovejoy (Malaysia) Ivan Yuen (Malaysia) Addeen Idrakie (India) Mahesh Mangaonkar |
| Squash on Fire Open; Washington, D.C., United States; Men : Challenger 20; 24 players - $20,000 −−−−−− Women : Challenger 20; 24 players - $20,000 | 27 Jun.–1 Jul. | (Belgium) Nele Gilis; 11–9, 11–6, 11–8 (7th PSA title) | (England) Georgina Kennedy | (United States) Olivia Fiechter (United States) Sabrina Sobhy | (Malaysia) Low Wee Wern (France) Mélissa Alves (Scotland) Lisa Aitken (India) Joshna Chinappa |

=== July ===
| Tournament | Date | Champion | Runner-Up | Semifinalists | Quarterfinalists |
|---|---|---|---|---|---|
| City of Peterborough Squash Open; Peterborough, England; Men : Challenger 3; 16 players - $1,500 −−−−−− Women : Challenger 3; 16 players - $1,500 | 3–4 July | (Scotland) Rory Stewart; 11–6, 11–3, 9–11, 11–8 (2nd PSA title) | (England) Miles Jenkins | (England) Sam Todd (England) Tom Walsh | (England) Curtis Malik (England) Harry Falconer (Wales) Elliott Morris Devred (England) Perry Malik |
| City of Peterborough Squash Open; Peterborough, England; Men : Challenger 3; 16 players - $1,500 −−−−−− Women : Challenger 3; 16 players - $1,500 | 3–4 July | (Scotland) Georgia Adderley; 11–7, 11–6, 11–2 (1st PSA title) | (England) Alicia Mead | (England) Elise Lazarus (England) Torrie Malik | (England) Grace Gear (England) Katie Wells (Scotland) Katriona Allen (England) Saran Nghiem |
| Vitall Sport Challenger; Bielsko-Biała, Poland; Men : Challenger 3; 16 players - $1,500 | 7–8 July | (Israel) Daniel Poleshchuk; 11–2, 11–6, 11–5 (5th PSA title) | (Poland) Filip Jarota | (Poland) Jakub Pytlowany (Poland) Jakub Gogol | (Poland) Przemysław Atras (Poland) Nataniel Hernas (Poland) Kajetan Lipski (Poland) Wojciech Gorczycki |
| Austrian Open; Salzburg, Austria; Men : Challenger 5; 16 players - $3,000 | 7–10 July | (Germany) Yannik Omlor; 11–8, 5–11, 11–8, 4–11, 11–3 (2nd PSA title) | (Switzerland) Yannick Wilhelmi | (Colombia) Juan Camilo Vargas (Switzerland) Robin Gadola | (Spain) Sergio García (Austria) Aqeel Rehman (Netherlands) Roshan Bharos (Czech Republic) Marek Panáček |
| New Malden Squash Festival; New Malden, England; Men : Challenger 3; 16 players - $1,500 −−−−−− Women : Challenger 3; 16 players - $1,500 | 7–10 July | (England) Joe Lee; 11–6, 11–6, 11–6 (6th PSA title) | (England) Sam Todd | (Wales) Owain Taylor (England) Perry Malik | (Republic of Ireland) Sean Conroy (England) Mike Harris (England) Hasnaat Farooqi (England) Nick Wall |
| New Malden Squash Festival; New Malden, England; Men : Challenger 3; 16 players - $1,500 −−−−−− Women : Challenger 3; 16 players - $1,500 | 7–10 July | (England) Georgina Kennedy; 11–9, 11–4, 11–7 (3rd PSA title) | (Scotland) Georgia Adderley | (England) Torrie Malik (Scotland) Alison Thomson | (Scotland) Katriona Allen (England) Charlotte Jagger (Netherlands) Sanne Veldkamp (Finland) Emilia Korhonen |
| Smash Basem Makram; Cairo, Egypt; Men : Challenger 3; 16 players - $1,500 | 14–17 July | (Egypt) Omar El Torkey; 7–11, 11–8, 12–10, 11–4 (1st PSA title) | (Egypt) Ziad Ibrahim | (Egypt) Ali Yacout (Egypt) Mohamed El Boraie | (Egypt) Ahmed Marzouk (Egypt) Yusuf El-Sherif (Egypt) Abdelrahman Nassar (Egypt) Omar Gohary |
| CIB Egyptian Challenger Tour #3; Cairo, Egypt; Men : Challenger 10; 24 players - $6,000 −−−−−− Women : Challenger 10; 24 players - $6,000 | 14–18 July | (Egypt) Moustafa El Sirty; 11–6, 10–12, 11–3, 11–9 (5th PSA title) | (Egypt) Aly Abou Eleinen | (Egypt) Seif Shenawy (Egypt) Karim Elbarbary | (Egypt) Mohamed Nasser (Egypt) Khaled Labib (Iraq) Mohamed Hassan (Egypt) Omar ElKattan |
| CIB Egyptian Challenger Tour #3; Cairo, Egypt; Men : Challenger 10; 24 players - $6,000 −−−−−− Women : Challenger 10; 24 players - $6,000 | 14–18 July | (Egypt) Fayrouz Aboelkheir; 11–5, 11–13, 4–11, 12–10, 11–4 (2nd PSA title) | (Egypt) Malak Kamal | (Egypt) Nardine Garas (Egypt) Zeina Zein | (Mexico) Diana García (Egypt) Malak Khafagy (Egypt) Nour Heikal (Egypt) Kenzy Ayman |
| The Eriswell Challenge at St George's Hill; Weybridge, England; Men : Challenger 10; 16 players - $6,000 | 15–18 July | (England) Joe Lee; 7–11, 11–4, 11–8, 6–11, 11–5 (7th PSA title) | (Scotland) Rory Stewart | (England) Tom Walsh (England) Charlie Lee | (England) Sam Todd (Wales) Elliott Morris Devred (Portugal) Rui Soares (Wales) Emyr Evans |
| Liquorland Howick Open; Howick, New Zealand; Men : Challenger 5; 16 players - $3,000 −−−−−− Women : Challenger 3; 16 players - $1,500 | 16–18 July | (Australia) Joseph White; 11–6, 12–10, 6–11, 11–7 (1st PSA title) | (New Zealand) Lwamba Chileshe | (New Zealand) Zac Millar (New Zealand) Temwa Chileshe | (New Zealand) Joel Arscott (New Zealand) Elijah Thomas (New Zealand) Sion Wiggin (New Zealand) Willz Donnelly |
| Liquorland Howick Open; Howick, New Zealand; Men : Challenger 5; 16 players - $3,000 −−−−−− Women : Challenger 3; 16 players - $1,500 | 16–18 July | (New Zealand) Amanda Landers-Murphy; 11–5, 11–4, 11–1 (13th PSA title) | (New Zealand) Ella Lash | (New Zealand) Abbie Palmer (New Zealand) Charlotte Galloway | (New Zealand) Crystal Tahata (New Zealand) Dora Galloway (New Zealand) Annmarie Holst (New Zealand) Kayti Carrick |
| PSA World Championship; Chicago, United States; Men : World Championship; 64 players - $500,000 - Draw −−−−−− Women : World Championship; 64 players - $500,000 - Draw | 14–22 July | (Egypt) Ali Farag; 7–11, 12–10, 11–9, 11–4 (22nd PSA title) (2nd World Championship title) | (Egypt) Mohamed El Shorbagy | (Egypt) Tarek Momen (New Zealand) Paul Coll | (Egypt) Karim Abdel Gawad (Egypt) Marwan El Shorbagy (Peru) Diego Elías (Egypt) Fares Dessouky |
| PSA World Championship; Chicago, United States; Men : World Championship; 64 players - $500,000 - Draw −−−−−− Women : World Championship; 64 players - $500,000 - Draw | 14–22 July | (Egypt) Nour El Sherbini; 11–5, 11–8, 8–11, 11–9 (25th PSA title) (5th World Championship title) | (Egypt) Nouran Gohar | (France) Camille Serme (United States) Amanda Sobhy | (New Zealand) Joelle King (Egypt) Hania El Hammamy (England) Sarah-Jane Perry (Egypt) Salma Hany |
| Carlisle Squash Club Open; Carlisle, England; Men : Challenger 5; 16 players - $3,000 | 20–23 July | (Scotland) Rory Stewart; 11–7, 9–11, 6–11, 11–8, 11–5 (3rd PSA title) | (England) Miles Jenkins | (England) Sam Todd (England) Harry Falconer | (England) Simon Herbert (Scotland) Fergus Richards (Wales) Elliott Morris Devred (England) Mike Harris |
| Off The Wall Squash Open; Colchester, England; Men : Challenger 5; 16 players - $3,000 −−−−−− Women : Challenger 5; 16 players - $3,000 | 22–24 July | (Portugal) Rui Soares; 11–4, 11–2, 14–12 (2nd PSA title) | (England) Daryl Selby | (England) Joshua Masters (England) Curtis Malik | (England) James Peach (Brazil) Vini Rodrigues (England) Stuart MacGregor (England) Tom Walsh |
| Off The Wall Squash Open; Colchester, England; Men : Challenger 5; 16 players - $3,000 −−−−−− Women : Challenger 5; 16 players - $3,000 | 22–24 July | (England) Georgina Kennedy; 11–9, 11–1, 11–3 (4th PSA title) | (Scotland) Georgia Adderley | (England) Anna Kimberley (Scotland) Alison Thomson | (Scotland) Katriona Allen (England) Katie Wells (England) Margot Prow (England) Kace Bartley |
| PSA Moscow Tour; Moscow, Russia; Men : Challenger 3; 16 players - $1,500 | 24–25 July | (Russia) Vladislav Titov; 11–5, 7–11, 9–11, 11–8, 11–8 (2nd PSA title) | (Russia) Makar Esin | (Russia) Petr Smekhov (Ukraine) Valeriy Fedoruk | (Russia) Alexander Rozhanskiy (Russia) Igor Sivkov (Kazakhstan) Kairat Baidauletov (Russia) Mikhail Skurikhin |
| Berkhamsted Linksap Open; Berkhamsted, England; Men : Challenger 10; 16 players - $6,000 −−−−−− Women : Challenger 10; 16 players - $6,000 | 29 Jul.–1 Aug. | (England) Ben Coleman; 11–8, 11–3, 11–2 (10th PSA title) | (England) Sam Todd | (Portugal) Rui Soares (Scotland) Rory Stewart | (Republic of Ireland) Sean Conroy (England) Joshua Masters (England) Tom Walsh (England) Connor Sheen |
| Berkhamsted Linksap Open; Berkhamsted, England; Men : Challenger 10; 16 players - $6,000 −−−−−− Women : Challenger 10; 16 players - $6,000 | 29 Jul.–1 Aug. | (England) Georgina Kennedy; 11–3, 11–3, 11–8 (5th PSA title) | (Scotland) Lisa Aitken | (Wales) Emily Whitlock (Scotland) Georgia Adderley | (England) Anna Kimberley (England) Grace Gear (Scotland) Alison Thomson (Pakistan) Faiza Zafar |
| Arion Homes Cheetham Hill Classic; Manchester, England; Men : Challenger 3; 16 players - $1,500 −−−−−− Women : Challenger 3; 16 players - $1,500 | 29 Jul.–1 Aug. | (England) Miles Jenkins; 11–8, 11–9, 11–9 (1st PSA title) | (England) James Peach | (England) Ben Smith (England) Curtis Malik | (England) Lewis Doughty (Wales) Owain Taylor (England) Perry Malik (Scotland) Fergus Richards |
| Arion Homes Cheetham Hill Classic; Manchester, England; Men : Challenger 3; 16 players - $1,500 −−−−−− Women : Challenger 3; 16 players - $1,500 | 29 Jul.–1 Aug. | (England) Lucy Beecroft; 11–6, 13–11, 11–5 (1st PSA title) | (England) Saran Nghiem | (England) Emma Bartley (England) Katie Wells | (England) Polly Clark (England) Asia Harris (Finland) Emilia Korhonen (England) Kiera Marshall |

== Statistical information ==
The players/nations are sorted by:

1. Total number of titles;
2. Cumulated importance of those titles;
3. Alphabetical order (by family names for players).

=== Key ===
World Championship
World Tour Platinum
World Tour Gold
World Tour Silver
World Tour Bronze
Challenger Tour 5/10/20/30

=== Titles won by player (men's) ===
| Total | Player | World Ch. / PSA Finals | Platinum | Gold | Silver | Bronze | Challenger 30 | Challenger 20 | Challenger 10 | Challenger 5 | Challenger 3 |
|---|---|---|---|---|---|---|---|---|---|---|---|
| 4 | Victor Crouin (FRA) | | | | | | | ● | ●●● | | |
| 4 | Grégory Gaultier (FRA) | | | | | | | | ●●●● | | |
| 4 | Evan Williams (NZL) | | | | | | | | ● | ●● | ● |
| 3 | Ali Farag (EGY) | ● ● | ●● | | | | | | | | |
| 3 | Faraz Khan (USA) | | | | | | | | ●● | | ● |
| 3 | Joe Lee (ENG) | | | | | | | | ● | | ●● |
| 3 | Ryosei Kobayashi (JPN) | | | | | | | | | ●●● | |
| 3 | Daniel Poleshchuk (ISR) | | | | | | | | | | ●●● |
| 2 | Mohamed El Shorbagy (EGY) | | ● | | ● | | | | | | |
| 2 | Tayyab Aslam (PAK) | | | | | | | | ●● | | |
| 2 | Leonel Cárdenas (MEX) | | | | | | | | ●● | | |
| 2 | Yip Tsz Fung (HKG) | | | | | | | | ●● | | |
| 2 | Syed Azlan Amjad (QAT) | | | | | | | | ● | ● | |
| 2 | Moustafa El Sirty (EGY) | | | | | | | | ● | ● | |
| 2 | Balázs Farkas (HUN) | | | | | | | | | ●● | |
| 2 | Alireza Shameli (IRI) | | | | | | | | | ●● | |
| 2 | Sajjad Zareeian (IRI) | | | | | | | | | ●● | |
| 2 | Lwamba Chileshe (NZL) | | | | | | | | | ● | ● |
| 2 | Yannik Omlor (GER) | | | | | | | | | ● | ● |
| 2 | Valentin Rapp (GER) | | | | | | | | | ● | ● |
| 2 | Rory Stewart (SCO) | | | | | | | | | ● | ● |
| 2 | Dewald van Niekerk (RSA) | | | | | | | | | ● | ● |
| 2 | Vladislav Titov (RUS) | | | | | | | | | | ●● |
| 2 | Bryan Lim Tze Kang (MYS) | | | | | | | | | | ●● |
| 1 | Mostafa Asal (EGY) | ● | | | | | | | | | |
| 1 | Marwan El Shorbagy (EGY) | | ● | | | | | | | | |
| 1 | Fares Dessouky (EGY) | | | ● | | | | | | | |
| 1 | Todd Harrity (USA) | | | | | | | ● | | | |
| 1 | Ben Coleman (ENG) | | | | | | | | ● | | |
| 1 | Robert Downer (ENG) | | | | | | | | ● | | |
| 1 | Rhys Dowling (AUS) | | | | | | | | ● | | |
| 1 | Wong Chi Him (HKG) | | | | | | | | ● | | |
| 1 | Richie Fallows (ENG) | | | | | | | | ● | | |
| 1 | Nasir Iqbal (PAK) | | | | | | | | ● | | |
| 1 | Bernat Jaume (ESP) | | | | | | | | ● | | |
| 1 | Shahjahan Khan (USA) | | | | | | | | ● | | |
| 1 | Dimitri Steinmann (SUI) | | | | | | | | ● | | |
| 1 | Ivan Yuen (MYS) | | | | | | | | ● | | |
| 1 | Sébastien Bonmalais (FRA) | | | | | | | | | ● | |
| 1 | Yahya Elnawasany (EGY) | | | | | | | | | ● | |
| 1 | Aly Hussein (EGY) | | | | | | | | | ● | |
| 1 | Raphael Kandra (GER) | | | | | | | | | ● | |
| 1 | Toufik Mekhalfi (FRA) | | | | | | | | | ● | |
| 1 | Ronald Palomino (COL) | | | | | | | | | ● | |
| 1 | Aqeel Rehman (AUT) | | | | | | | | | ● | |
| 1 | Rui Soares (POR) | | | | | | | | | ● | |
| 1 | Jakub Solnický (CZE) | | | | | | | | | ● | |
| 1 | Hugo Varela (ESP) | | | | | | | | | ● | |
| 1 | Juan Camilo Vargas (COL) | | | | | | | | | ● | |
| 1 | Yannick Wilhelmi (SUI) | | | | | | | | | ● | |
| 1 | Joseph White (AUS) | | | | | | | | | ● | |
| 1 | Omar El Torkey (EGY) | | | | | | | | | | ● |
| 1 | Joeri Hapers (BEL) | | | | | | | | | | ● |
| 1 | Miles Jenkins (ENG) | | | | | | | | | | ● |
| 1 | Iván Pérez (ESP) | | | | | | | | | | ● |
| 1 | Ryūnosuke Tsukue (JPN) | | | | | | | | | | ● |

=== Titles won by nation (men's) ===
| Total | Nation | World Ch. / PSA Finals | Platinum | Gold | Silver | Bronze | Challenger 30 | Challenger 20 | Challenger 10 | Challenger 5 | Challenger 3 |
|---|---|---|---|---|---|---|---|---|---|---|---|
| 13 | Egypt (EGY) | ● ● | ●●●● | ● | ● | | | | ● | ●●● | ● |
| 11 | France (FRA) | | | | | | | ● | ●●●●●●● | ●●● | |
| 7 | England (ENG) | | | | | | | | ●●●● | | ●●● |
| 6 | New Zealand (NZL) | | | | | | | | ● | ●●● | ●● |
| 5 | United States (USA) | | | | | | | ● | ●●● | | ● |
| 5 | Germany (GER) | | | | | | | | | ●●● | ●● |
| 4 | Iran (IRI) | | | | | | | | | ●●●● | |
| 4 | Japan (JPN) | | | | | | | | | ●●● | ● |
| 3 | Hong Kong (HKG) | | | | | | | | ●●● | | |
| 3 | Pakistan (PAK) | | | | | | | | ●●● | | |
| 3 | Switzerland (SUI) | | | | | | | | ●● | ● | |
| 3 | Spain (ESP) | | | | | | | | ● | ●● | |
| 3 | Malaysia (MYS) | | | | | | | | ● | | ●● |
| 3 | Israel (ISR) | | | | | | | | | | ●●● |
| 2 | Mexico (MEX) | | | | | | | | ●● | | |
| 2 | Australia (AUS) | | | | | | | | ● | ● | |
| 2 | Qatar (QAT) | | | | | | | | ● | ● | |
| 2 | Colombia (COL) | | | | | | | | | ●● | |
| 2 | Hungary (HUN) | | | | | | | | | ●● | |
| 2 | Scotland (SCO) | | | | | | | | | ● | ● |
| 2 | South Africa (RSA) | | | | | | | | | ● | ● |
| 2 | Russia (RUS) | | | | | | | | | | ●● |
| 1 | Austria (AUT) | | | | | | | | | ● | |
| 1 | Czech Republic (CZE) | | | | | | | | | ● | |
| 1 | Portugal (POR) | | | | | | | | | ● | |
| 1 | Belgium (BEL) | | | | | | | | | | ● |

=== Titles won by player (women's) ===
| Total | Player | World Ch. / PSA Finals | Platinum | Gold | Silver | Bronze | Challenger 30 | Challenger 20 | Challenger 10 | Challenger 5 | Challenger 3 |
|---|---|---|---|---|---|---|---|---|---|---|---|
| 5 | Georgina Kennedy (ENG) | | | | | | | | ● | ● | ●●● |
| 4 | Nour El Sherbini (EGY) | ● | ●●● | | | | | | | | |
| 3 | Kaitlyn Watts (NZL) | | | | | | | | | | ●●● |
| 2 | Ambre Allinckx (SUI) | | | | | | | | ●● | | |
| 2 | Chan Sin Yuk (HKG) | | | | | | | | ●● | | |
| 2 | Karina Tyma (POL) | | | | | | | | ●● | | |
| 2 | Fayrouz Aboelkheir (EGY) | | | | | | | | ● | ● | |
| 2 | Mélissa Alves (FRA) | | | | | | | | ● | ● | |
| 2 | Cristina Gómez (ESP) | | | | | | | | ● | ● | |
| 2 | Madina Zafar (PAK) | | | | | | | | ● | ● | |
| 2 | Lizelle Muller (RSA) | | | | | | | | | ● | ● |
| 2 | Jessica Turnbull (AUS) | | | | | | | | | ● | ● |
| 1 | Nouran Gohar (EGY) | ● | | | | | | | | | |
| 1 | Sarah-Jane Perry (ENG) | | | ● | | | | | | | |
| 1 | Nour El Tayeb (EGY) | | | | ● | | | | | | |
| 1 | Nele Gilis (BEL) | | | | | | | ● | | | |
| 1 | Aifa Azman (MYS) | | | | | | | | ● | | |
| 1 | Rachael Grinham (AUS) | | | | | | | | ● | | |
| 1 | Tamika Hunt (AUS) | | | | | | | | ● | | |
| 1 | Cindy Merlo (SUI) | | | | | | | | ● | | |
| 1 | Hana Moataz (EGY) | | | | | | | | ● | | |
| 1 | Liu Tsz Ling (HKG) | | | | | | | | ● | | |
| 1 | Énora Villard (FRA) | | | | | | | | ● | | |
| 1 | Amna Fayyaz (PAK) | | | | | | | | | ● | |
| 1 | Sana Ibrahim (EGY) | | | | | | | | | ● | |
| 1 | Georgia Adderley (SCO) | | | | | | | | | | ● |
| 1 | Lucy Beecroft (ENG) | | | | | | | | | | ● |
| 1 | Saskia Beinhard (GER) | | | | | | | | | | ● |
| 1 | Hannah Chukwu (HUN) | | | | | | | | | | ● |
| 1 | Jasmine Hutton (ENG) | | | | | | | | | | ● |
| 1 | Amanda Landers-Murphy (NZL) | | | | | | | | | | ● |
| 1 | Ineta Mackeviča (LAT) | | | | | | | | | | ● |
| 1 | Alicia Mead (ENG) | | | | | | | | | | ● |
| 1 | Milou van der Heijden (NED) | | | | | | | | | | ● |

=== Titles won by nation (women's) ===
| Total | Nation | World Ch. / PSA Finals | Platinum | Gold | Silver | Bronze | Challenger 30 | Challenger 20 | Challenger 10 | Challenger 5 | Challenger 3 |
|---|---|---|---|---|---|---|---|---|---|---|---|
| 10 | Egypt (EGY) | ● ● | ●●● | | ● | | | | ●● | ●● | |
| 9 | England (ENG) | | | ● | | | | | ● | ● | ●●●●●● |
| 4 | Australia (AUS) | | | | | | | | ●● | ● | ● |
| 4 | New Zealand (NZL) | | | | | | | | | | ●●●● |
| 3 | France (FRA) | | | | | | | | ●●● | | |
| 3 | Hong Kong (HKG) | | | | | | | | ●●● | | |
| 3 | Switzerland (SUI) | | | | | | | | ●●● | | |
| 3 | Pakistan (PAK) | | | | | | | | ● | ●● | |
| 2 | Poland (POL) | | | | | | | | ●● | | |
| 2 | Spain (ESP) | | | | | | | | ● | ● | |
| 2 | South Africa (RSA) | | | | | | | | | ● | ● |
| 1 | Belgium (BEL) | | | | | | | ● | | | |
| 1 | Malaysia (MYS) | | | | | | | | ● | | |
| 1 | Germany (GER) | | | | | | | | | | ● |
| 1 | Hungary (HUN) | | | | | | | | | | ● |
| 1 | Latvia (LAT) | | | | | | | | | | ● |
| 1 | Netherlands (NED) | | | | | | | | | | ● |
| 1 | Scotland (SCO) | | | | | | | | | | ● |

=== World Championship qualifiers ===
Winners of Odense Open qualification event receive a wildcard for the Men's and Women's World Championships. The qualified players are:

| Player | Date | PSA ranking | Tier |
|---|---|---|---|
| Aly Hussein (EGY) | 19 June 2021 | 161 | PSA Challenger Tour 5 |
| Cristina Gómez (ESP) | 19 June 2021 | 72 | PSA Challenger Tour 5 |

== World and Continental championships ==
| Event | Date | Venue | Men's | | Women's | | |
| Event | Date | Venue | champion | runner-up | champion | runner-up | |
|---|---|---|---|---|---|---|---|
| ~~European Individual~~ | August 26–29, 2020 | – Prague; Czech Republic | champion | runner-up | champion | runner-up | Cancelled due to COVID-19 in Europe. |
| ~~European Club~~ | September 16–19, 2020 | – Riccione; Italy | Cancelled due to COVID-19 in Europe. | | | | |
| ~~European Junior~~ | December 10–13, 2020 | – Eindhoven; Netherlands | Moved to early September/October 2021 due to COVID-19 in the Netherlands. | | | | |
| ~~Women's World Team~~ | January, 2021 | – Kuala Lumpur; Malaysia | Cancelled/Postponed to 2022 due to COVID-19 in Malaysia. | | | | |
| ~~European Masters Individual~~ | June 16–19, 2021 | – Edinburgh; Scotland | Cancelled due to COVID-19 in Europe. | | | | |
| ~~World Doubles~~ | July 1–5, 2021 | – Gold Coast; Australia | Postponed to a later date COVID-19 in Australia. | | | | |
| ~~European Team – Division 3~~ | July 14–17, 2021 | – Ljubljana; Slovenia | Cancelled due to COVID-19 in Europe. | | | | |
| PSA World Championships | July 14–22, 2021 | University Club of Chicago; Chicago; United States | Ali Farag (EGY); 7–11, 12–10, 11–9, 11–4 | Mohamed El Shorbagy (EGY) | Nour El Sherbini (EGY); 11–5, 11–8, 8–11, 11–9 | Nouran Gohar (EGY) | |

== National championships ==
These are the winners of the most relevant 2020–2021 national squash championships.

| Country | Date | Venue | Men's champion | Women's champion |
|---|---|---|---|---|
| Australia | June 17–20, 2021 | Castlereagh Club, Sydney | Rex Hedrick | Tamika Saxby |
| Brazil | June 23–27, 2021 | Renato Gallego Squash Academy, São Caetano do Sul | Guilherme Melo | Tatiana Borges |
| Colombia | December 11–13, 2020 | Club Campestre de Bucaramanga, Floridablanca | Juan Camilo Vargas | Laura Tovar |
| Croatia | November 7–8, 2020 | First Fitness & Squash Tower, Zagreb | Martin Kegel | Franka Vidović |
| Denmark | November 20–22, 2020 | Skinderskovhallen, Herlev | Rasmus Nielsen | Sarah Lauridsen |
| Finland | May 29–30, 2021 | Tali Badminton & Squash Center, Helsinki | Miko Äijänen | Emilia Soini |
| France | March 4–7, 2021 | SquashBad33, Bordeaux | Grégoire Marche | Camille Serme |
| Hong Kong | Jun 27–Jul 3, 2021 | Hong Kong Squash Centre, Hong Kong | Yip Tsz Fung | Lee Ka Yi |
| Hungary | May 28–30, 2021 | Squash Club Szeged, Szeged | Balázs Farkas | Hannah Chukwu |
| Italy | December 4–6, 2020 | Centro Tecnico Federale FIGS, Riccione | Yuri Farneti | Monica Menegozzi |
| Malaysia | October 6–11, 2020 | National Squash Centre, Bukit Jalil | Ivan Yuen | Low Wee Wern |
| New Zealand (2020) | Oct 30–Nov 1, 2020 | North Shore Squash Club, Takapuna | Evan Williams | Emma Millar (2020) |
| Norway (2020) | October 2–4, 2020 | Lysaker Squash, Lysaker | Trym Aasness | Lotte Eriksen |
| Norway (2021) | June 24–27, 2021 | Lysaker Squash, Lysaker | Adrian Østbye | Madeleine Hylland |
| Pakistan (W) | January 17–19, 2021 | Hyderabad Gymkhana, Hyderabad | | Zaynab Khan |
| Poland (2020) | September 10–12, 2020 | Hasta La Vista Sports Center, Wrocław | Filip Jarota | Karina Tyma |
| Poland (2021) | June 10–12, 2021 | Hasta La Vista Sports Center, Wrocław | Filip Jarota | Karina Tyma |
| Portugal | July 10–11, 2021 | Proracket Squash & Padel, São Mamede de Infesta | Rui Soares | Catarina Nunes |
| Singapore | Nov 28–Dec 6, 2020 | Kallang Squash Centre, Kallang | Samuel Kang | Wai Yhann Au Yeong |
| Slovakia | November 26–28, 2020 | IMET Squash Centrum, Bratislava | Miroslav Celler | |
| Slovenia | May 28–30, 2021 | Squashland Ljubljana, Ljubljana | Luka Kustec | Nina Kustec |
| South Africa | October 15–17, 2020 | Brooklyn Mall, Pretoria | Christo Potgieter | Alexandra Fuller |
| Spain | May 28–30, 2021 | Esportiu Rocafort, Barcelona | Iker Pajares | Marta Domínguez |
| Sweden | October 16–18, 2020 | Enskede Rackethall, Stockholm | Christian Drakenberg | Moa Bönnemark |
| Switzerland | September 3–6, 2020 | Sihlsports, Langnau am Albis | Nicolas Müller | Ambre Allinckx |
| Ukraine | February 19–21, 2021 | Sport Life Teremky, Kyiv | Valeriy Fedoruk | Nadiya Usenko |

== Retirements ==
Following is a list of notable players (winners of a main tour title, and/or part of the PSA Men's World Rankings and Women's World Rankings top 30 for at least one month) who announced their retirement from professional squash, became inactive, or were permanently banned from playing, during the 2020–21 season:

- (New Zealand) Campbell Grayson
- (Egypt) Nour El Tayeb
- (Germany) Simon Rösner

== See also ==
- 2020–21 PSA World Tour Finals
- 2021 Men's PSA World Tour Finals
- 2021 Women's PSA World Tour Finals
