= Lwamba Chileshe =

New Zealand squash player (born 1999)

Personal information
- Born: 4 April 1999 (age 27) Ndola, Zambia

Sport
- Coached by: Evans Chileshe
- Racquet used: Harrow
- Highest ranking: 144 (October 2020)
- Current ranking: 144 (October 2020)
- Updated on October 2020

Lwamba Chileshe (born 4 April 1999) is a Zambian-born New Zealand professional squash player. He achieved his highest career PSA ranking of 144 in October 2020 as a part of the 2020-21 PSA World Tour.
