= Fanny Segers =

French squash player (born 1999)

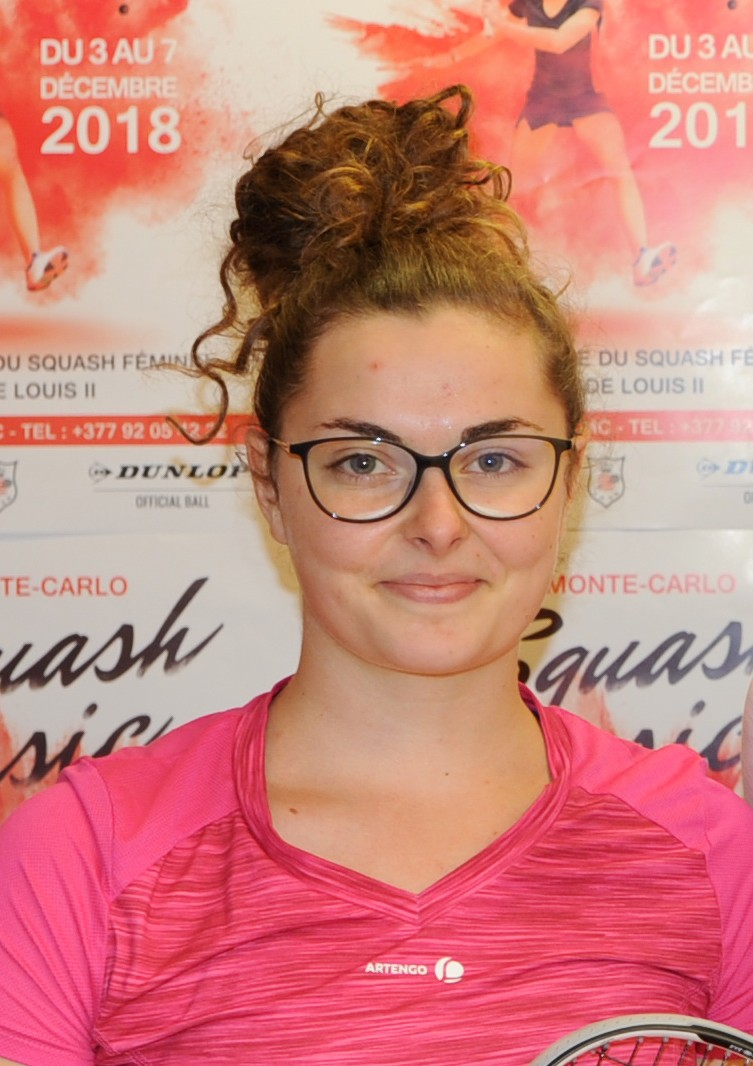
- Fanny Segers 2018, Monte Carlo Squash Classic 2018

Personal information
- Born: 13 September 1999 (age 26) Annonay, France

Sport
- Country: France
- Handedness: Right Handed
- Retired: Active
- Racquet used: Eye

Women's singles
- Highest ranking: No. 119 (June 2019)
- Current ranking: No. 123 (September 2019)
- Updated on September 2019

Fanny Segers (born 13 September 1999 in Annonay) is a French professional squash player. As of December 2018, she was ranked number 180 in the world.
