= Emilia Korhonen =

Finnish squash player (born 1995)

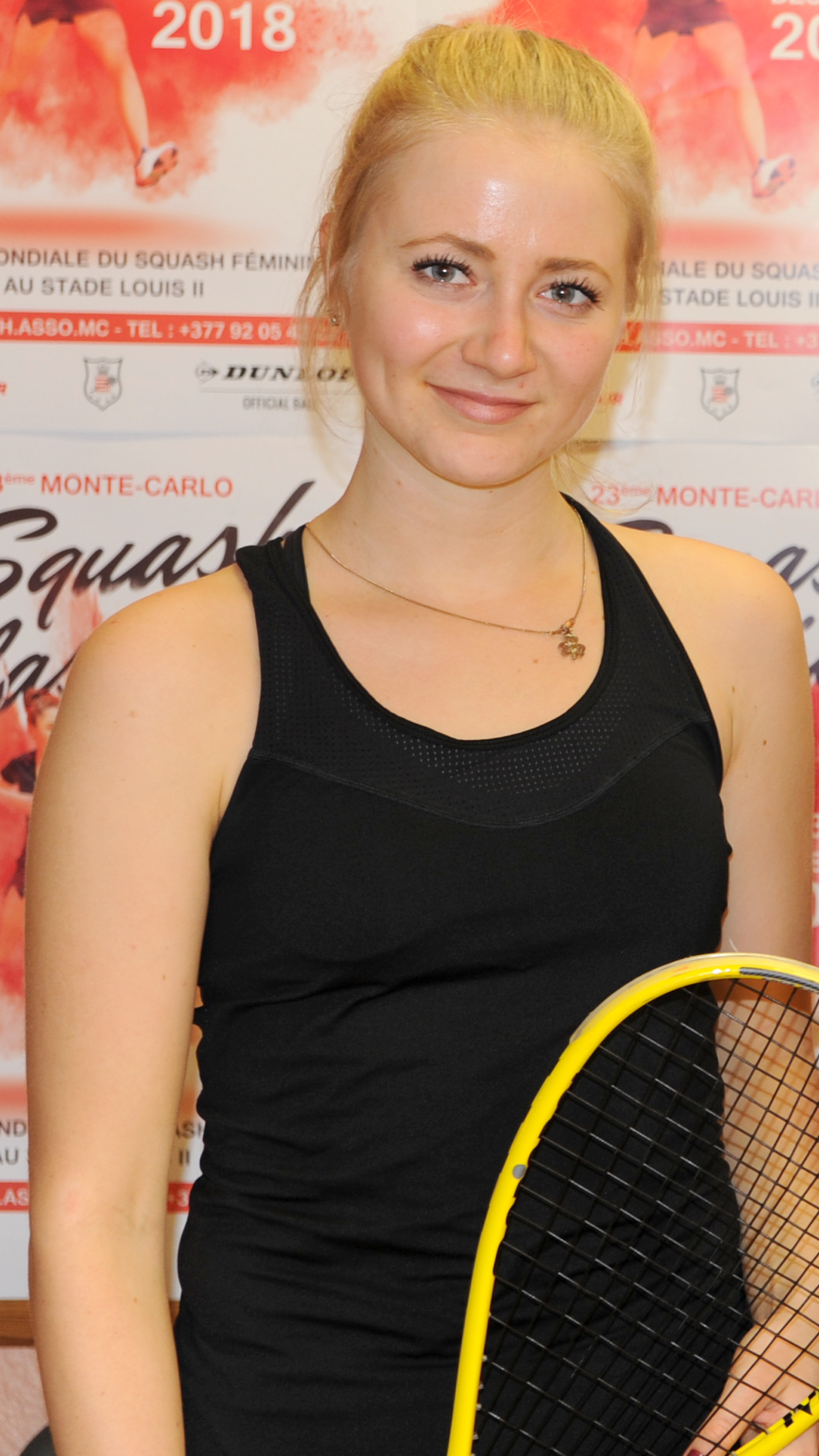
- Emilia Korhonen, Monte Carlo Squash Classic 2018

Personal information
- Born: 13 September 1995 (age 30) Espoo, Finland

Sport
- Country: Finland
- Turned pro: 2016
- Coached by: Jon Tate, Matias Tuomi
- Retired: Active
- Racquet used: Karakal

Women's singles
- Highest ranking: No. 109 (August 2022)
- Current ranking: No. 109 (August 2022)
- Updated on August 2022

Emilia Korhonen (born 13 September 1995 in Espoo) is a Finnish professional squash player. As of August 2022, she was ranked number 109 in the world. She represents Finland in international competitions. She was the Finnish national champion in 2018.
