= Léa Barbeau =

French squash player (born 2000)

Personal information
- Born: 20 October 2000 (age 25) La Roche-sur-Yon, France
- Height: 1.72 m (5 ft 8 in)
- Weight: 64 kg (141 lb)

Sport
- Country: France
- Turned pro: 2019
- Coached by: Nicholas Barbeau
- Retired: Active
- Racquet used: Technifibre

women's singles
- Highest ranking: 115 (May 2021)
- Current ranking: 115 (May 2021)
- Updated on 29 May 2021

Léa Barbeau (born 20 October 2000) is a French professional squash player. She achieved her highest career PSA ranking of 115 in May 2021 during the 2020-21 PSA World Tour.
