= Nadia Pfister =

Swiss squash player (born 1995)

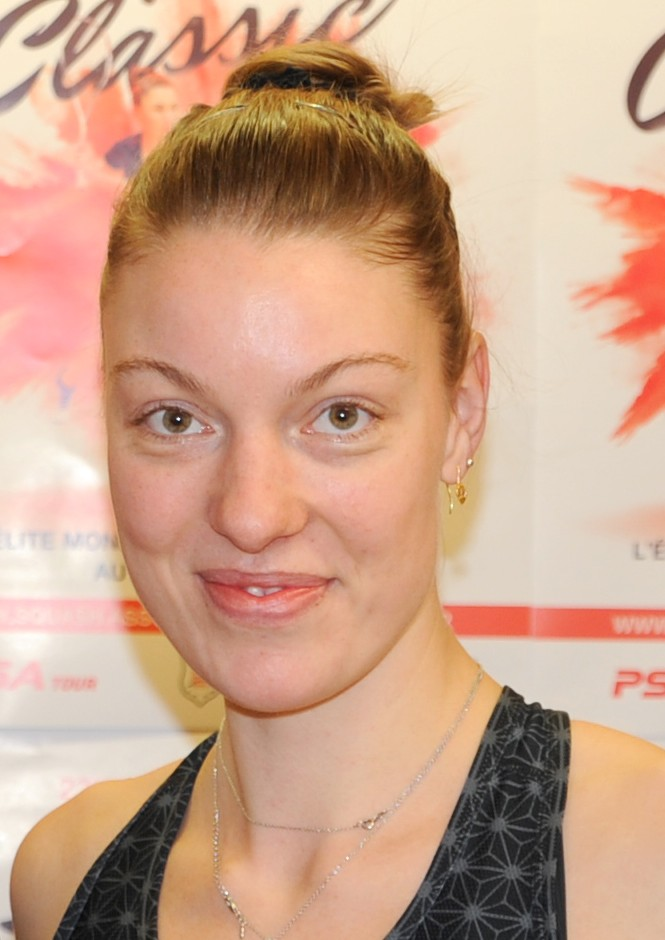
- Nadia Pfister, Monte Carlo Squash Classic 2018

Personal information
- Born: 18 September 1995 (age 30) Basel, Switzerland
- Height: 178 cm (5 ft 10 in)
- Weight: 65 kg (143 lb)

Sport
- Country: Switzerland
- Coached by: Daniel Pfister-Wiederkehr
- Retired: Active
- Racquet used: Dunlop

Women's singles
- Highest ranking: No. 58 (February 2022)
- Current ranking: No. 84 (October 2024)

Nadia Pfister (born 18 September 1995) is a Swiss professional squash player. Pfister reached a career high ranking of 58 in the world during February 2022.

== Career ==
Pfister has represented Switzerland internationally at the European Squash Team Championships.

In 2024, Pfister won her maiden PSA title after securing victory in the Swiss Open during the 2024–25 PSA Squash Tour.
