= Vladislav Titov (squash player) =

Russian squash player (born 1997)

Personal information
- Full name: Russian: Владисла́в Тито́в
- Born: 10 February 1997 (age 29) Novosibirsk, Russia

Sport
- Country: Russia
- Turned pro: 2017
- Retired: Active
- Racquet used: Head

Men's singles
- Highest ranking: No. 198 (July 2019)
- Current ranking: No. 209 (May 2021)
- Updated on May 2021

Vladislav Titov (Russian: Владисла́в Тито́в, born 10 February 1997 in Novosibirsk) is a Russian professional squash player. As of May 2021, he was ranked number 209 in the world.
