= Dewald van Niekerk =

South African squash player (born 1997)

Personal information
- Born: 3 June 1997 (age 29) Port Elizabeth, South Africa

Sport
- Country: South African
- Turned pro: 2020
- Retired: Active
- Racquet used: Salming

Men's singles
- Highest ranking: No. 68 (July 2025)
- Current ranking: No. 69 (December 2025)
- Title: 9

Dewald van Niekerk (born 3 June 1997) is a South African professional squash player. He reached a career high ranking of 68 in the world during July 2025.

== Career ==
In August 2024 and as the number 1 seed, van Niekerk won the South African national title.

In September 2024, van Niekerk won his 6th PSA title after securing victory in the Aramis Club Open during the 2024–25 PSA Squash Tour and soon followed this up with a 7th and 8th by winning the Mossel Bay Diaz Open and World Championship Qualifiers respectively. He won a 9th PSA title winning the Namibian Open during the 2025–26 PSA Squash Tour.

== Family ==
His sister Lizelle Muller is also a professional squash player.
