= Amna Fayyaz =

Pakistani squash player (born 2002)

Personal information
- Born: 2 August 2002 (age 23) Rawalpindi

Sport
- Country: Pakistan

Women's singles
- Highest ranking: No. 86 (February 2021)
- Current ranking: No. 87 (March 2021)
Medal record
Women's squash
Representing Pakistan
South Asian Games
Silver medal – second place	2019 Nepal	Team
- Updated on March 2021

Amna Fayyaz (born 2 August 2002) is a Pakistani professional squash player. As of April 2022, she was ranked number 121 in the world. She won the 2019 Pakistan Squash Circuit I professional tournament.
