= Sanne Veldkamp =

Dutch squash player (born 1997)

Personal information
- Born: 21 July 1997 (age 29) Amsterdam

Sport
- Racquet used: Dunlop
- Highest ranking: 94 (August 2019)
- Current ranking: 100 (February 2020)
- Updated on February 2020

Sanne Veldkamp (born 21 July 1997) is a Dutch professional squash player. She achieved her highest career PSA singles ranking of 94 in August 2019.
