= Marek Panáček =

Czech squash player (born 2002)

Personal information
- Born: 27 August 2002 (age 23) Uherské Hradište, Czech Republic

Sport
- Country: Czech Republic
- Turned pro: 2018
- Retired: Active
- Racquet used: Dunlop

Men's singles
- Highest ranking: No. 119 (March 2022)
- Current ranking: No. 154 (August 2022)
- Updated on August 2022

Marek Panáček (born 27 August 2002 in Uherské Hradište) is a Czech professional squash player. As of August 2022, he was ranked number 154 in the world. He won the 2022 Ostrava Open.
