= Filip Jarota =

Polish squash player (born 2001)

Personal information
- Born: 15 June 2001 (age 25) Szczecin, Poland

Sport
- Country: Poland
- Turned pro: 2019
- Retired: Active
- Racquet used: Eye

Men's singles
- Highest ranking: No. 222 (July 2021)
- Current ranking: No. 222 (July 2021)
- Updated on July 2021

Filip Jarota (born 15 June 2001 in Szczecin) is a Polish professional squash player. As of July 2021, he was ranked number 222 in the world.
