= Harley Lam =

Hong Kong squash player (born 1999)

Personal information
- Born: 31 May 1999 (age 27) Hong Kong

Sport
- Country: Hong Kong
- Handedness: Right-handed
- Turned pro: 2015
- Coached by: Abdul Faheem Khan
- Retired: Active

Men's singles
- Highest ranking: No. 156 (July 2021)
- Current ranking: No. 191 (July 2022)
- Updated on July 2022

Harley Lam also known as Lam Yat Ting (born 31 May 1999 in Hong Kong) is a Hong Kong professional squash player. As of July 2022, he was ranked number 191 in the world. He won the 2021 KCC PSA Challenge Cup.
