= Miles Jenkins =

English squash player (born 1994)

Personal information
- Born: 27 December 1994 (age 31) Chichester, England
- Height: 185 cm (6 ft 1 in)
- Weight: 76 kg (168 lb)

Sport
- Country: England
- Handedness: Right Handed
- Turned pro: 2014
- Retired: Active
- Racquet used: Unsquashable
- Highest ranking: No. 144 (September 2020)
- Current ranking: No. 155 (July 2021)
- Updated on July 2021

Miles Jenkins (born 27 December 1994 in Chichester) is an English professional squash player. As of February 2018, he was ranked number 165 in the world.
