= Hugo Varela =

Spanish professional squash player (born 1992)

Personal information
- Born: June 30, 1992 (age 34) Vigo, Spain

Sport
- Country: Spain
- Handedness: Right Handed
- Turned pro: 2010
- Retired: Active
- Racquet used: Tecnifibre

Men's singles
- Highest ranking: No. 128 (October 2020)
- Current ranking: No. 129 (December 2020)
- Title: 2
- Updated on December 2020

Hugo Varela (born 30 June 1992 in Vigo) is a Spanish professional squash player. As of December 2020, he was ranked number 129 in the world. He has won 2 PSA titles.
