= Robert Downer =

English squash player (born 1992)

Personal information
- Born: 24 March 1992 (age 34) Portsmouth, England
- Height: 1.82 m (6 ft 0 in)
- Weight: 75 kg (165 lb)

Sport
- Country: England
- Turned pro: 2009
- Coached by: Tim Vail
- Retired: Active
- Racquet used: Tecnifibre

Men's singles
- Highest ranking: No. 132 (September 2015)
- Current ranking: No. 106 (April 2021)
- Title: 1
- Updated on April 2021

Robert Downer (born 24 March 1992 in Portsmouth) is a professional squash player who represents England. He reached a career-high world ranking of World No. 106 in April 2021.
