= Ambre Allinckx =

Swiss squash player (born 2002)

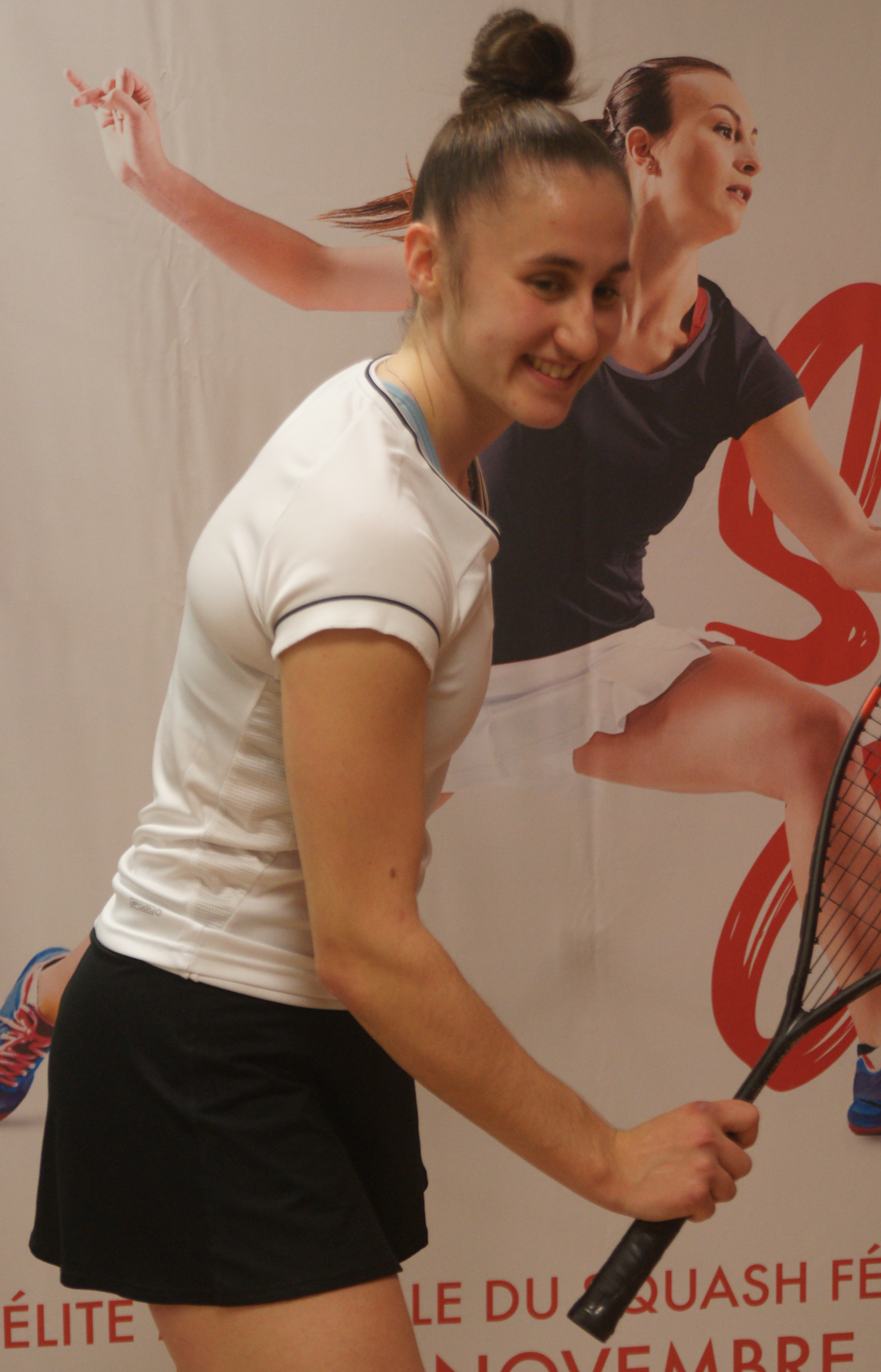
- Ambre Allinckx, Monte-Carlo Squash Classic 2023

Personal information
- Born: 26 March 2002 (age 24) Lucerne, Switzerland

Sport
- Country: Switzerland
- Turned pro: 2018
- Coached by: Emmanuel Crouin, Roman Allinckx
- Retired: Active
- Racquet used: Unsquashable

Women's singles
- Highest ranking: No. 68 (January 2021)
- Current ranking: No. 110 (May 2025)
- Title: 4

Ambre Allinckx (born 26 March 2002) is a Swiss professional squash player. She reached a career high ranking of 68 in the world during January 2021.

== Biography ==
In May 2025, Allinckx won her fourth PSA title after securing victory in the Basque Country Challenger during the 2024–25 PSA Squash Tour.
