= Aqeel Rehman =

Austrian squash player (born 1985)

Personal information
- Born: 12 September 1985 (age 40) Salzburg, Austria
- Height: 1.72 m (5 ft 8 in)
- Weight: 68 kg (150 lb)

Sport
- Turned pro: 2006
- Coached by: David Pearson
- Retired: Active
- Racquet used: Wilson

Men's singles
- Highest ranking: No. 76 (September 2021)
- Current ranking: No. 137 (December 2025)
- Title: 16

Aqeel Rehman (born 12 September 1985) is a professional squash player who represents Austria. He reached a career-high world ranking of No. 76 in the world in September 2021.

== Biography ==
In July 2025, rehman won his 15th PSA title after securing victory in the Shepparton International during the 2024–25 PSA Squash Tour. In December 2025, he won his 16th PSA title, winning the Liechtenstein Open during the 2025–26 PSA Squash Tour.
