= Rana Ismail =

Egyptian squash player (born 2002)

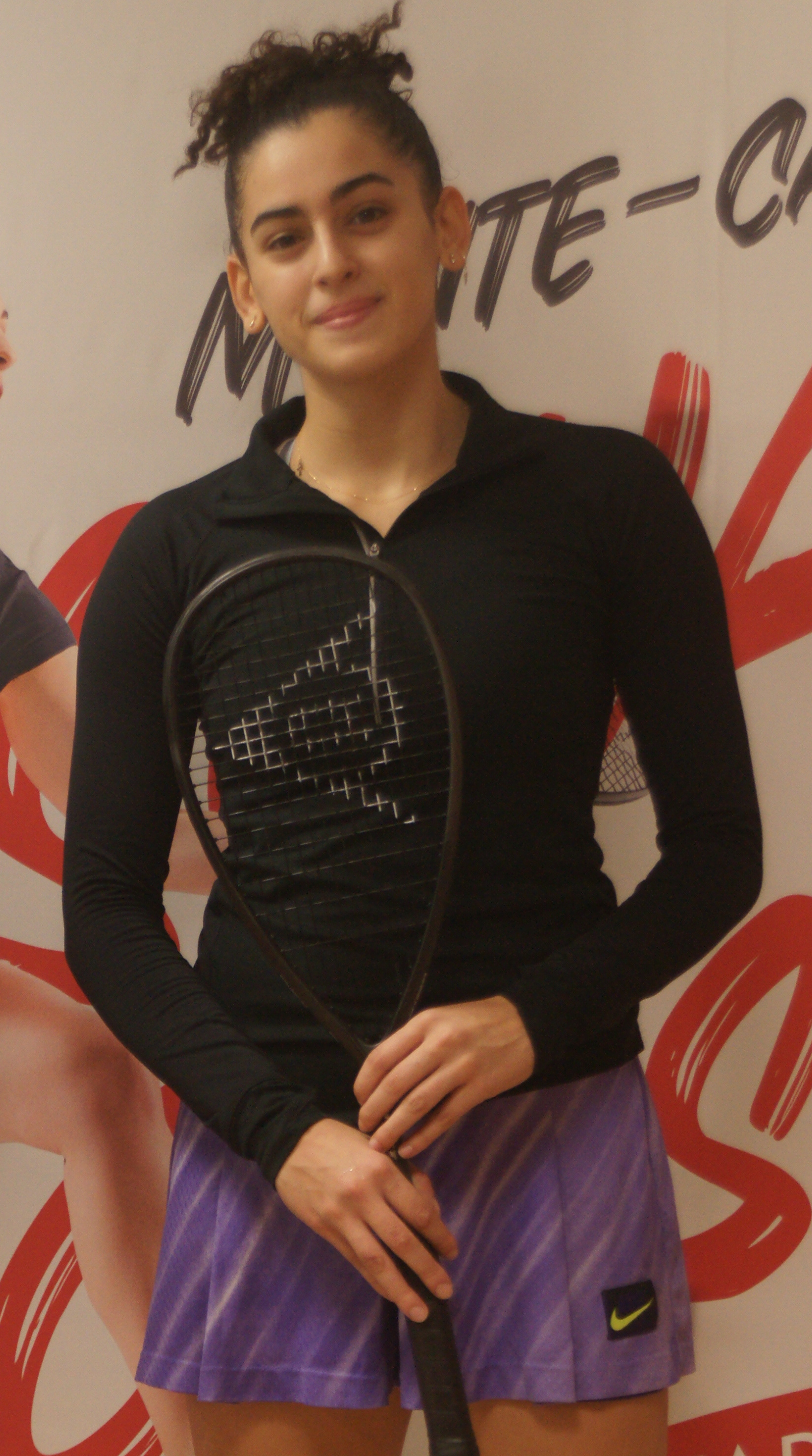
- Rana Ismail, Monte Carlo Squash Classic 2023

Personal information
- Born: 20 July 2002 (age 24) Dubai

Sport
- Country: Egypt
- Turned pro: 2018
- Retired: Active
- Racquet used: Dunlop

Women's singles
- Highest ranking: No. 66 (April 2024)
- Current ranking: No. 66 (April 2024)
- Updated on April 2024

Rana Ismail (born 20 July 2002 in Dubai) is an Egyptian professional squash player. As of April 2024, she was ranked number 66 in the world, which was also her career's highest PSA ranking.
