= Lizelle Muller =

South African squash player (born 1984)

Personal information
- Born: 4 October 1984 (age 41) Port Elizabeth, South Africa

Sport
- Country: South Africa
- Turned pro: 2020
- Retired: Active
- Racquet used: Salming

Women's singles
- Highest ranking: No. 108 (April 2022)
- Current ranking: No. 108 (April 2022)
- Updated on April 2022

Lizelle Muller, previously known as Lizelle van Niekerk (born 4 October 1984 in Port Elizabeth), is a South African professional squash player. As of April 2022, she was ranked number 108 in the world. She is the sister of Dewald van Niekerk, also a professional squash player.
