= Grace Clark =

American signal processing researcher

Grace A. Clark is an American signal processing and acoustics researcher, formerly a researcher at the Lawrence Livermore National Laboratory and an engineering consultant through her firm Grace Clark Signal Sciences in Livermore, California.

== Education and career ==
Clark is a graduate of Purdue University. After continuing at Purdue for a master's degree, she completed a Ph.D. at the University of California, Santa Barbara. After working as a researcher for the Lawrence Livermore National Laboratory for more than 35 years, she retired in 2013.

== Recognition ==
In 2007 Clark was elected as an IEEE Fellow "for contributions in block adaptive filtering".

== Personal life ==
Clark is also a guitar, banjo, and Dobro player, specializing in western swing and bluegrass music.
