= Valeriy Fedoruk =

Ukrainian squash player (born 1983)

Personal information
- Born: 5 February 1983 (age 43) Krasnodon, Ukraine

Sport
- Country: Ukraine
- Turned pro: 2018
- Retired: Active
- Racquet used: Harrow

Men's singles
- Highest ranking: No. 148 (March 2022)
- Current ranking: No. 148 (March 2022)
- Updated on March 2022

Valeriy Fedoruk (born 5 February 1983 in Krasnodon) is a Ukrainian professional squash player. As of September 2021, he was ranked number 202 in the world, and number 1 in Ukraine.
