= Abbie Palmer =

New Zealand squash player (born 1997)

Personal information
- Born: 30 October 1997 (age 28) Whangārei, New Zealand
- Height: 162 cm (5 ft 4 in)
- Weight: 60 kg (132 lb)

Sport
- Country: New Zealand
- Turned pro: 2013
- Coached by: Paul Hornsby
- Retired: Active
- Racquet used: Head

Women's singles
- Highest ranking: No. 83 (June 2018)
- Current ranking: No. 333 (November 2023)
- Updated on November 2023

Abbie Palmer (born 30 October 1997) is a New Zealand professional squash player. Her highest ranking was number 83 in the world in June 2018.

== Life and career ==
Palmer was born in Whangārei, and attended Bream Bay College. She began playing squash at age 4 and was coached by Shelley Kitchen until 2011. At age 13 she was the youngest ever competitor selected for the New Zealand under-19 girls team to compete at the 2011 World Junior Squash Championships.

In 2015 she won the under-19s title at the New Zealand North Island Junior Age Group Champs, prior to competing at the World Junior Squash Championship in the Netherlands. At the 2015 Commonwealth Youth Games in that year she won a silver medal in the women's doubles and a bronze medal in mixed doubles.

In 2018 she was named in New Zealand's team for the World Squash Championships after placing third in New Zealand's national championships and being part of the winning teams for New Zealand women's doubles and mixed doubles. In 2022 she was named in New Zealand's team for the 2022 Commonwealth Games, forming a doubles team with Kaitlyn Watts. They were knocked out in the round of 16 and did not make the quarter-finals. As of 2023 she was ranked 178 in the world.
