= Monte Carlo Squash Classic =

Squash tournament

Monte Carlo Classic

Details
- Event name: Monte Carlo Squash Classic
- Location: Monte Carlo, Monaco
- Venue: Monte-Carlo Squash Racket Club
- Website; Official website

Men's Winner
- Category: PSA Challenger Tour 20
- Prize money: $32,500

The Monte Carlo Classic is a yearly professional squash tournament for women, held in Monte Carlo, Monaco. In its current version, it is part of the PSA World Tour. In recent times it has been held in November or December each year. The prize money as of 2025 was $32,500, but there have been various differences over the years.

== Results ==
Year	Winner	Runner-up	score	Notes/Ref
1996	(Australia) Sarah Fitz-Gerald	(England) Cassie Campion	9–4, 9–2, 4–9, 9–6	
1997	(Australia) Sarah Fitz-Gerald	(England) Sue Wright	9–1, 4–9, 9–1, 9–4	
1998	(England) Sue Wright	(Germany) Sabine Schöne	9–2, 9–4, 9–8	
1999	(England) Cassie Campion	(Netherlands) Vanessa Atkinson	9–6, 9–0, 9–5	
2000	(England) Fiona Geaves	(England) Stephanie Brind	6–9, 1–9, 9–7, 9–2, 9–3	
2001	(England) Cassie Campion	(England) Fiona Geaves	9–5, 9–3, 9–0	
2002	(United States) Natalie Pohrer	(England) Rebecca Macree	9–3, 9–5, 9–3	
2003	(England) Linda Charman	(Malaysia) Nicol David	8–10, 9–1, 9–6, 9–1	
2004	(England) Cassie Jackman	(England) Jenny Tranfield	9–6, 9–0, 9–5	
2005	(Netherlands) Vanessa Atkinson	(Republic of Ireland) Madeline Perry	9–2, 9–5, 9–7	
2006	(Australia) Natalie Grinham	(Netherlands) Vanessa Atkinson	9–2, 9–6, 9–2	
2007	(Australia) Natalie Grinham	(Australia) Rachael Grinham	9–7, 9–6, 9–7	
2008	(England) Laura Massaro	(Australia) Rachael Grinham	11–7, 11–9, 9–11, 7–11, 11–9	
2009	(England) Laura Massaro	(Republic of Ireland) Madeline Perry	11–5, 11–9, 11–13, 2–11, 11–6	
2010	(Egypt) Omneya Abdel Kawy	(Netherlands) Vanessa Atkinson	11–5, 11–7, 4–11, 11–9	
2011	(Netherlands) Natalie Grinham	(Hong Kong) Annie Au	7–11, 9–11, 12–10, 11–8, 11–8	
2012	(Netherlands) Natalie Grinham	(Republic of Ireland) Madeline Perry	6–11, 12–10, 11–2, 11–2	
2013	(France) Camille Serme	(England) Laura Massaro	11–7, 17–15, 9–11, 11–8	
2014	(Egypt) Nouran Ahmed Gohar	(Egypt) Omneya Abdel Kawy	15–13, 10–12, 11–7, 7–11, 11–9	
2015	(England) Jenny Duncalf	(England) Sarah-Jane Perry	11–4, 13–11, 11–9	
2016	(England) Victoria Lust	(England) Millie Tomlinson	9–11, 11–6, 5–11, 11–9, 11–8	
2017	(Australia) Donna Urquhart	(Egypt) Zeina Mickawy	7–11, 11–4, 10–12, 11–2, 11–9	
2018	(England) Laura Massaro	(Wales) Tesni Evans	11–9, 11–13, 11–9, 7–11, 11–3	
2019	(United States) Sabrina Sobhy	(Egypt) Yathreb Adel	11–3, 12–10, 11–5	
2020 and 2021 not held due to COVID-19 pandemic
2022	(France) Mélissa Alves	(Egypt) Rana Ismail	11–7, 10–12, 11–7, 11–9	
2023	(England) Lucy Turmel	(Wales) Emily Whitlock	w/o	Whitlock injured
2024	(Wales) Tesni Murphy	(England) Sarah-Jane Perry	11–9, 11–9, 12–10	
2025	(France) Mélissa Alves	(Egypt) Zeina Mickawy	11–5, 11–3, 11–9	

== See also ==
- PSA World Tour
- WSA World Tour
