= Men's Qatar Classic (squash) 2021 =

Qatar Classic 2021
- 19th Men's Qatar Classic

Details
- Event name: QTerminals Qatar Classic 2021
- Location: Doha, Qatar
- Venue: Khalifa International Tennis and Squash Complex
- Dates: 17–23 October 2021
- Website qatarsquash.com/qterminals/

Men's Winner
- Prize money: $187,500
- Year: 2021–22 PSA World Tour

The Men's Qatar Classic 2021 was the men's edition of the 2021 Qatar Classic squash tournament, which was a 2021–22 PSA World Tour Platinum event (prize money: $187,500). The event took place at the Khalifa International Tennis and Squash Complex in Doha, Qatar from 17 to 23 October.

Diego Elías of Peru won his first PSA World Tour Platinum event title, and became the first Peruvian to win a major event on the PSA World Tour after defeating New Zealand's Paul Coll in the final, winning in four games with a score of 13–11, 5–11, 13–11, 11–9.

== Seeds ==
1. (Egypt) Mohamed ElShorbagy (second round)
2. (New Zealand) Paul Coll (runner-up)
3. (Egypt) Tarek Momen (quarter-finals)
4. (Egypt) Marwan El Shorbagy (third round)
5. (Egypt) Karim Abdel Gawad (second round)
6. (Peru) Diego Elías (champion)
7. (Egypt) Mostafa Asal (semi-finals)
8. (Wales) Joel Makin (semi-finals)

== Draw and results ==
=== Semi finals and final ===
Semi-finals
8	(Wales) Joel Makin	5	11	6	7
6	(Peru) Diego Elías	11	8	11	11
7	(Egypt) Mostafa Asal	9	8	4
2	(New Zealand) Paul Coll	11	11	11

Final
6	(Peru) Diego Elías	13	5	13	11
2	(New Zealand) Paul Coll	11	11	11	9

=== Main Draw ===
==== Top half ====
First round
1	(Egypt) Mohamed ElShorbagy
[Bye]
(Egypt) Youssef Ibrahim
[Bye]
(Egypt) Mazen Hesham
[Bye]
(Spain) Bernat Jaume	11	11	12	11	6
(England) George Parker	3	9	14	13	11
(Scotland) Greg Lobban	9	7	11	14	8
(India) Ramit Tandon	11	11	9	12	11
(Hong Kong) Tsz Fung Yip	3	11	6	11	9
(England) Patrick Rooney	11	9	11	5	11
(Spain) Iker Pajares Bernabeu	11	11	10	10	11
(Switzerland) Dimitri Steinmann	4	9	12	12	7
8	(Wales) Joel Makin
[Bye]
6	(Peru) Diego Elías
[Bye]
(Qatar) Syed Azlan Amjad	4	5	7
(England) Declan James	11	11	11
(Mexico) César Salazar	10	11	3^{r}
(France) Sébastien Bonmalais	12	6	11
(France) Grégoire Marche
[Bye]
(Germany) Raphael Kandra	11	11	11
(Qatar) Abdulrahman Al-Malki	2	7	5
(India) Mahesh Mangaonkar	11	11	3	11
(Scotland) Alan Clyne	7	6	11	2
(Spain) Borja Golán	13	11	7	11
(United States) Todd Harrity	11	8	11	2
4	(Egypt) Marwan El Shorbagy
[Bye]

Second round
1	(Egypt) Mohamed ElShorbagy	3	5	11	9
(Egypt) Youssef Ibrahim	11	11	7	11
(Egypt) Mazen Hesham	11	11	11
(England) George Parker	4	6	7
(India) Ramit Tandon	9	11	6	6
(England) Patrick Rooney	11	5	11	11
(Spain) Iker Pajares Bernabeu	10	9	8
8	(Wales) Joel Makin	12	11	11
6	(Peru) Diego Elías	10	11	9	11	11
(England) Declan James	12	6	11	0	8
(France) Sébastien Bonmalais	7	9	4
(France) Grégoire Marche	11	11	11
(Germany) Raphael Kandra	11	7	10	11	11
(India) Mahesh Mangaonkar	7	11	12	9	4
(Spain) Borja Golán	9	12	13	7	6
4	(Egypt) Marwan El Shorbagy	11	10	11	11	11

Third round
(Egypt) Youssef Ibrahim	11	4	13	6	8
(Egypt) Mazen Hesham	9	11	11	11	11
(England) Patrick Rooney	5	5	8
8	(Wales) Joel Makin	11	11	11
6	(Peru) Diego Elías	5	8	11	11	11
(France) Grégoire Marche	11	11	4	9	4
(Germany) Raphael Kandra	12	11	10	11	11
4	(Egypt) Marwan El Shorbagy	14	3	12	5	7

Quarter-finals
(Egypt) Mazen Hesham	9	4	3
8	(Wales) Joel Makin	11	11	11
Semi-finals
8	(Wales) Joel Makin	5	11	6	7
6	(Peru) Diego Elías	11	8	11	11
6	(Peru) Diego Elías	11	8	14	11
(Germany) Raphael Kandra	9	11	12	1

==== Bottom half ====
First round
3	(Egypt) Tarek Momen
[Bye]
(United States) Faraz Khan	1	4	3
(England) James Willstrop	11	11	11
(France) Lucas Serme	11	11	11
(Egypt) Mazen Gamal	4	5	6
(United States) Shahjahan Khan	12	5	5
(England) Tom Richards	14	11	11
(Egypt) Youssef Soliman
[Bye]
(Egypt) Omar Mosaad
[Bye]
(India) Saurav Ghosal
[Bye]
7	(Egypt) Mostafa Asal
[Bye]
5	(Egypt) Karim Abdel Gawad
[Bye]
(Egypt) Mohamed Abouelghar
[Bye]
(England) Adrian Waller	5	6	11	11	11
(England) Nathan Lake	11	11	7	7	9
(United States) Christopher Gordon	9	10	12	11	3
(Egypt) Mohamed ElSherbini	11	12	10	9	11
(Switzerland) Nicolas Müller	11	8	7	11	11
(Japan) Ryosei Kobayashi	9	11	11	9	7
(France) Baptiste Masotti
[Bye]
(Mexico) Arturo Salazar	11	6	11	6	6
(Portugal) Rui Soares	7	11	4	11	11
2	(New Zealand) Paul Coll
[Bye]

Second round
3	(Egypt) Tarek Momen	11	11	11
(England) James Willstrop	5	9	9
(France) Lucas Serme	10	8	11	9
(England) Tom Richards	12	11	4	11
(Egypt) Youssef Soliman	11	6	10	11	11
(Egypt) Omar Mosaad	2	11	12	3	8
(India) Saurav Ghosal	11	11	9	6
7	(Egypt) Mostafa Asal	7	13	11	11
5	(Egypt) Karim Abdel Gawad	11	3	8	3
(Egypt) Mohamed Abouelghar	4	11	11	11
(England) Adrian Waller	w/o
(Egypt) Mohamed ElSherbini
(Switzerland) Nicolas Müller	2	12	1
(France) Baptiste Masotti	11	14	11
(Portugal) Rui Soares	4	3	5
2	(New Zealand) Paul Coll	11	11	11

Third round
3	(Egypt) Tarek Momen	13	13	11
(England) Tom Richards	11	11	5
(Egypt) Youssef Soliman	11	8	1^{r}
7	(Egypt) Mostafa Asal	11	11	2
(Egypt) Mohamed Abouelghar	11	11	11
(England) Adrian Waller	4	3	6
(France) Baptiste Masotti	9	4	9
2	(New Zealand) Paul Coll	11	11	11

Quarter-finals
3	(Egypt) Tarek Momen	11	10	9	14	4
7	(Egypt) Mostafa Asal	4	12	11	12	11
Semi-finals
7	(Egypt) Mostafa Asal	9	8	4
2	(New Zealand) Paul Coll	11	11	11
(Egypt) Mohamed Abouelghar	5	11	12	10	8
2	(New Zealand) Paul Coll	11	4	10	12	11
