= Men's United States Open (squash) 2021 =

US Open 2021
- 33rd Men's US Open

Details
- Event name: US Open 2021
- Location: (United States) Philadelphia, Pennsylvania
- Venue: Arlen Specter US Squash Center
- Dates: 1–6 October 2021
- Website www.usopensquash.com

Men's Winner
- Prize money: $150,000
- Year: 2021–22 PSA World Tour

The Men's United States Squash Open 2021 was the men's edition of the 2021 United States Open (squash), which was a 2021–22 PSA World Tour Platinum event (prize money: $150,000). The event took place at the Arlen Specter US Squash Center in Philadelphia, Pennsylvania in the United States from the 1st of October to the 6th of October.

Mostafa Asal of Egypt won his first PSA World Tour Platinum event title by beating fellow countryman Tarek Momen in the final, winning in five games with a score of 5–11, 5–11, 11–9, 12–10, 11–3.

== Seeds ==
1. (Egypt) Ali Farag (quarter-finals)
2. (Egypt) Mohamed ElShorbagy (quarter-finals)
3. (New Zealand) Paul Coll (quarter-finals)
4. (Egypt) Tarek Momen (runner-up)
5. (Egypt) Marwan El Shorbagy (second round)
6. (Egypt) Karim Abdel Gawad (second round)
7. (Peru) Diego Elías (semi-finals)
8. (Egypt) Mostafa Asal (champion)

== Draw and results ==
=== Semi-finals and final ===
Semi-finals
(Wales) Joel Makin	9	11	8	11	8
4	(Egypt) Tarek Momen	11	5	11	7	11
8	(Egypt) Mostafa Asal	11	11	3	2	12
7	(Peru) Diego Elías	7	8	11	11	10

Final
4	(Egypt) Tarek Momen	11	11	9	10	3
8	(Egypt) Mostafa Asal	5	5	11	12	11

=== Main draw ===
==== Top half ====
First round
1	(Egypt) Ali Farag
[Bye]
(India) Saurav Ghosal
[Bye]
(Egypt) Mazen Hesham
[Bye]
(France) Grégoire Marche
[Bye]
(Egypt) Omar Mosaad
[Bye]
(France) Sébastien Bonmalais	5	11	11
(Mexico) Arturo Salazar	11	7	2^{r}
(Wales) Joel Makin
[Bye]
6	(Egypt) Karim Abdel Gawad
[Bye]
5	(Egypt) Marwan El Shorbagy
[Bye]
(Hong Kong) Tsz Fung Yip	8	7	7
(England) James Willstrop	11	11	11
(Switzerland) Nicolas Müller	11	4	11	11
(United States) Faraz Khan	8	11	4	9
(Egypt) Mohamed Abouelghar
[Bye]
(England) Patrick Rooney	11	11	11
(Spain) Bernat Jaume	5	7	8
(France) Auguste Dussourd	6	11	11	7	11
(Spain) Borja Golán	11	5	9	11	5
(France) Lucas Serme	12	9	6	9
(India) Ramit Tandon	10	11	11	11
4	(Egypt) Tarek Momen
[Bye]

Second round
1	(Egypt) Ali Farag	11	11	11
(India) Saurav Ghosal	5	5	5
(Egypt) Mazen Hesham	8	11	11	11
(France) Grégoire Marche	11	6	8	5
(Egypt) Omar Mosaad	11	3	9	9
(France) Sébastien Bonmalais	8	11	11	11
(Wales) Joel Makin	13	14	11
6	(Egypt) Karim Abdel Gawad	11	12	8
5	(Egypt) Marwan El Shorbagy	11	5	4	8
(England) James Willstrop	9	11	11	11
(Switzerland) Nicolas Müller	4	11	3	5
(Egypt) Mohamed Abouelghar	11	7	11	11
(England) Patrick Rooney	7	7	11	11	13
(France) Auguste Dussourd	11	11	2	5	11
(India) Ramit Tandon	4	8	4
4	(Egypt) Tarek Momen	11	11	11

Third round
1	(Egypt) Ali Farag	11	11	10	11
(Egypt) Mazen Hesham	5	3	12	7
(France) Sébastien Bonmalais	6	11	5	9
(Wales) Joel Makin	11	6	11	11
(England) James Willstrop	11	7	9	11	11
(Egypt) Mohamed Abouelghar	9	11	11	4	3
(England) Patrick Rooney	11	5	8	7
4	(Egypt) Tarek Momen	8	11	11	11

Quarter-finals
1	(Egypt) Ali Farag	5	7	14
(Wales) Joel Makin	11	11	16
Semi-finals
(Wales) Joel Makin	9	11	8	11	8
4	(Egypt) Tarek Momen	11	5	11	7	11
(England) James Willstrop	7	13	6	9
4	(Egypt) Tarek Momen	11	11	11	11

==== Bottom half ====
First round
3	(New Zealand) Paul Coll
[Bye]
(United States) Timothy Brownell	4	11	5	4
(France) Victor Crouin	11	4	11	11
(Scotland) Alan Clyne	11	11	4	6	9
(Egypt) Karim El Hammamy	9	7	11	11	11
(Egypt) Youssef Ibrahim
[Bye]
(Scotland) Greg Lobban	11	7	11	11
(Switzerland) Dimitri Steinmann	7	11	3	2
(Mexico) Leonel Cárdenas	8	11	4	6
(France) Baptiste Masotti	11	9	11	11
(Spain) Iker Pajares Bernabeu	8	11	11	11
(England) Nathan Lake	11	5	6	8
8	(Egypt) Mostafa Asal
[Bye]
7	(Peru) Diego Elías
[Bye]
(England) Ben Coleman	9	12	9	8
(England) Adrian Waller	11	10	11	11
(England) Tom Richards	11	8	8	10
(India) Vikram Malhotra	8	11	11	12
(United States) Todd Harrity	11	3	5	11	4
(Germany) Raphael Kandra	4	11	11	7	11
(Mexico) César Salazar	11	4	11	11
(United States) Shahjahan Khan	3	11	3	5
(India) Mahesh Mangaonkar	8	6	4
(Egypt) Youssef Soliman	11	11	11
(Malaysia) Eain Yow Ng
[Bye]
2	(Egypt) Mohamed ElShorbagy
[Bye]

Second round
3	(New Zealand) Paul Coll	11	11	11
(France) Victor Crouin	6	8	5
(Egypt) Karim El Hammamy	4	11	11	11
(Egypt) Youssef Ibrahim	11	6	9	9
(Scotland) Greg Lobban	11	1	8	9
(France) Baptiste Masotti	6	11	11	11
(Spain) Iker Pajares Bernabeu	6	4	12
8	(Egypt) Mostafa Asal	11	11	14
7	(Peru) Diego Elías	11	11	11
(England) Adrian Waller	3	5	5
(India) Vikram Malhotra	9	11	11	9	5
(Germany) Raphael Kandra	11	5	8	11	11
(Mexico) César Salazar	2	10	2
(Egypt) Youssef Soliman	11	12	11
(Malaysia) Eain Yow Ng	10	6	11	10
2	(Egypt) Mohamed ElShorbagy	12	11	5	12

Third round
3	(New Zealand) Paul Coll	11	11	11
(Egypt) Karim El Hammamy	2	3	3
(France) Baptiste Masotti	12	7	11	7	3
8	(Egypt) Mostafa Asal	10	11	5	11	11
7	(Peru) Diego Elías	11	11	10	12
(Germany) Raphael Kandra	2	4	12	10
(Egypt) Youssef Soliman	8	10	11	6
2	(Egypt) Mohamed ElShorbagy	11	12	9	11

Quarter-finals
3	(New Zealand) Paul Coll	8	11	5	7
8	(Egypt) Mostafa Asal	11	9	11	11
Semi-finals
8	(Egypt) Mostafa Asal	11	11	3	2	12
7	(Peru) Diego Elías	7	8	11	11	10
7	(Peru) Diego Elías	5	11	11	11
2	(Egypt) Mohamed ElShorbagy	11	8	4	1

== See also ==
- Women's United States Open (squash) 2021
