= Squash at the 2022 World Games – Men's singles =

Squash men's singles at the 2022 World Games
- Venue: University of Alabama Birmingham; Birmingham, United States
- Dates: 13–17 July 2022
- Competitors: 28 from 18 nations

Medalists
gold medal	(France) Victor Crouin
silver medal	(France) Grégoire Marche
bronze medal	(Colombia) Miguel Ángel Rodríguez

The men's singles squash competition at the 2022 World Games took place from 13 to 17 July 2022 at the University of Alabama Birmingham in Birmingham, United States.

== Competition format ==
A total of 28 athletes entered the competition. Players competed in classic cup system.

== Seeds ==
1. (France) Grégoire Marche (runner-up)
2. (Colombia) Miguel Ángel Rodríguez (third place)
3. (France) Victor Crouin (champion)
4. (Germany) Raphael Kandra (quarter-finals)
5. (France) Baptiste Masotti (quarter-finals)
6. (United States) Shahjahan Khan (quarter-finals)
7. (Switzerland) Dimitri Steinmann (Fourth place)
8. (United States) Faraz Khan (round of 16)

== Results ==
Round of 32
(Australia) Rhys Dowling	2
9/16	(United States) Christopher Gordon	0
9/16	(Canada) David Baillargeon	2
(Peru) Rafael Gálvez	0
(Spain) Sergio García Pollan	0
5/8	(United States) Faraz Khan	2
5/8	(Switzerland) Dimitri Steinmann	2
(Ukraine) Valeriy Fedoruk	0
(Republic of Ireland) Sean Conroy	1
9/16	(Colombia) Ronald Palomino	2
9/16	(Czech Republic) Jakub Solnický	2
(Poland) Filip Jarota	1
(Hong Kong) Harley Lam	1
9/16	(Switzerland) Yannick Wilhelmi	2
9/16	(Germany) Yannik Omlor	1
(Australia) Joseph White	2
(Brazil) Vinicius Rodrigues	0
5/8	(United States) Shahjahan Khan	2
5/8	(France) Baptiste Masotti	2
(Ukraine) Dmytro Scherbakov	0
(Germany) Simon Rösner	2
9/16	(Hungary) Balázs Farkas	1
9/16	(Czech Republic) Martin Švec	1
(Argentina) Jeremías Azaña	2

Round of 16
1	(France) Grégoire Marche	2
(Australia) Rhys Dowling	0
9/16	(Canada) David Baillargeon	2
5/8	(United States) Faraz Khan	1
5/8	(Switzerland) Dimitri Steinmann	2
9/16	(Colombia) Ronald Palomino	1
(Czech Republic) Jakub Solnický	0
3/4	(Germany) Raphael Kandra	2
3/4	(France) Victor Crouin	2
9/16	(Switzerland) Yannick Wilhelmi	0
(Australia) Joseph White	0
5/8	(United States) Shahjahan Khan	2
5/8	(France) Baptiste Masotti	2
(Germany) Simon Rösner	1
(Argentina) Jeremías Azaña	0
2	(Colombia) Miguel Ángel Rodríguez	2

Quarter finals
1	(France) Grégoire Marche	2
9/16	(Canada) David Baillargeon	0
5/8	(Switzerland) Dimitri Steinmann	2
3/4	(Germany) Raphael Kandra	0
3/4	(France) Victor Crouin	2
5/8	(United States) Shahjahan Khan	1
5/8	(France) Baptiste Masotti	0
2	(Colombia) Miguel Ángel Rodríguez	2

Semi-finals
1	(France) Grégoire Marche	3
5/8	(Switzerland) Dimitri Steinmann	0
3/4	(France) Victor Crouin	3
2	(Colombia) Miguel Ángel Rodríguez	1

Finals
1	(France) Grégoire Marche	2
3/4	(France) Victor Crouin	3

3rd place
5/8	(Switzerland) Dimitri Steinmann	1
3/4	(Colombia) Miguel Ángel Rodríguez	3
