= 2017 Men's World Team Squash Championships =

Men's World Team 2017
- 25th WSF World Men's Team Championship
- Location: Marseille, France
- Date: November 26-December 3, 2017
- Website squash999.com/wsfmensteams/

Results
- Champions: Egypt
- Runners-up: England
- Third place: Hong Kong, Australia (shared)

The 2017 Men's World Team Squash Championships was the men's edition of the 2017 world men's team championship, which serves as the world team championship for squash players. The event was held in Marseille, France, from November 26 to December 3, 2017. The tournament is organized by the World Squash Federation and the French Squash Federation.

The Egyptian team won their fourth World Team Championships after beating England in the final.

Since there was no 3rd-place match, Hong Kong and Australia both shared the bronze medal.

== Participating teams ==
A total of 24 teams competed from all the five confederations: Africa, America, Asia, Europe and Oceania. For Jamaica, it was their first participation at a world team championship.

Africa (SFA)	America (FPS)	Asia (ASF)	Europe (ESF)	Oceania (OSF)
Egypt; South Africa	Argentina; Canada; Jamaica; United States	Hong Kong; India; Iraq; Malaysia; Pakistan	Austria; Czech Republic; England (Title Holder); France (Host Country); Finland; Germany; Ireland; Scotland; Spain; Switzerland; Wales	Australia; New Zealand

== Seeds ==
1. Egypt (champion)
2. England (runner-up)
3. France (quarterfinals)
4. Australia (semifinals)
5. Hong Kong (semifinals)
6. New Zealand (quarterfinals)
7. Germany (round of 16)
8. India (quarterfinals)

== Squads ==
Argentina

- Leandro Romiglio
- Juan Pablo Roude
- Roberto Pezzota
- Rodrigo Obegron

Australia

- Ryan Cuskelly
- Cameron Pilley
- Rex Hedrick
- Zac Alexander

Austria

- Aqeel Rehman
- Jakob Dirnberger
- Paul Mairinger
- Lukas Windischberger

Canada

- Nick Sachvie
- Andrew Schnell
- Shawn Delierre
- Mike McCue

Czech Republic

- Daniel Mekbib
- Jakub Solnický
- Martin Švec
- Ondřej Uherka

Egypt

- Karim Abdel Gawad
- Ali Farag
- Marwan ElShorbagy
- Ramy Ashour

England

- Nick Matthew
- James Willstrop
- Daryl Selby
- Adrian Waller

Finland

- Olli Tuominen
- Matias Tuomi
- Miko Äijänen
- Jami Äijänen

France

- Grégory Gaultier
- Grégoire Marche
- Mathieu Castagnet
- Lucas Serme

Germany

- Simon Rösner
- Raphael Kandra
- Valentin Rapp
- Rudi Rohrmüller

Hong Kong

- Max Lee
- Leo Au
- Yip Tsz Fung
- Tang Ming Hong

India

- Saurav Ghosal
- Harinder Pal Sandhu
- Vikram Malhotra
- Mahesh Mangaonkar

Iraq

- Mohamed Hassan
- Rasool Al-Sultani
- Hasanain Dakheel
- Husham Al-Saadi

(Republic of Ireland) Ireland

- Arthur Gaskin
- Drian Byrne
- Sean Conroy
- Conor O'Hare

Jamaica

- Chris Binnie
- Bruce Burrowes
- Lewis Walters
- Dane Schwier

Malaysia

- Mohamad Nafiizwan Adnan
- Ng Eain Yow
- Mohammad Syafiq Kamal
- Muhammad Addeen Idrakie

New Zealand

- Paul Coll
- Campbell Grayson
- Evan Williams
- Ben Grindrod

Pakistan

- Farhan Zaman
- Amaad Fareed
- Muhammad Asim Khan
- Shahjahan Khan

Scotland

- Alan Clyne
- Greg Lobban
- Douglas Kempsell
- Kevin Moran

South Africa

- Thoboki Mohohlo
- Christo Potgieter
- Rodney Durbach
- Gary Wheadon

Spain

- Borja Golán
- Carlos Cornes
- Iker Pajares
- Bernat Jaume

Switzerland

- Nicolas Mueller
- Dimitri Steinmann
- Reiko Peter
- Roman Allinckx

United States

- Chris Gordon
- Chris Hanson
- Todd Harrity
- Faraz Khan

Wales

- Peter Creed
- David Haley
- Joel Makin
- Emyr Evans

== Group stage ==
=== Pool A ===
November 27, 2017

Egypt	3	-	0	Pakistan

November 28, 2017

Egypt	3	-	0	Switzerland

November 29, 2017

Switzerland	3	-	0	Pakistan

Rank	Nation	Match	Won	Lost	Points
1	Egypt	2	2	0	4
2	Switzerland	2	1	1	2
3	Pakistan	2	0	2	0

=== Pool B ===
November 27, 2017

England	3	-	0	Argentina

November 28, 2017

England	3	-	0	Finland

November 29, 2017

Finland	2	-	1	Argentina

Rank	Nation	Match	Won	Lost	Points
1	England	2	2	0	4
2	Finland	2	1	1	2
3	Argentina	2	0	2	1

=== Pool C ===
November 27, 2017

France	3	-	0	(Republic of Ireland) Ireland

November 28, 2017

France	3	-	0	Canada

November 29, 2017

Canada	3	-	0	(Republic of Ireland) Ireland

Rank	Nation	Match	Won	Lost	Points
1	France	2	2	0	4
2	Canada	2	1	1	2
3	(Republic of Ireland) Ireland	2	0	2	0

=== Pool D ===
November 27, 2017

Australia	3	-	0	Czech Republic

November 28, 2017

Australia	3	-	0	Wales

November 29, 2017

Wales	3	-	0	Czech Republic

Rank	Nation	Match	Won	Lost	Points
1	Australia	2	2	0	4
2	Wales	2	1	1	2
3	Czech Republic	2	0	2	0

=== Pool E ===
November 27, 2017

Hong Kong	3	-	0	Iraq

November 28, 2017

Hong Kong	3	-	0	Spain

November 29, 2017

Spain	3	-	0	Iraq

Rank	Nation	Match	Won	Lost	Points
1	Hong Kong	2	2	0	4
2	Spain	2	1	1	2
3	Iraq	2	0	2	0

=== Pool F ===
November 27, 2017

New Zealand	3	-	0	South Africa

November 28, 2017

New Zealand	2	-	1	United States

November 29, 2017

United States	3	-	0	South Africa

Rank	Nation	Match	Won	Lost	Points
1	New Zealand	2	2	0	4
2	United States	2	1	1	2
3	South Africa	2	0	2	0

=== Pool G ===
November 27, 2017

Germany	3	-	0	Jamaica

November 28, 2017

Germany	2	-	1	Scotland

November 29, 2017

Scotland	3	-	0	Jamaica

Rank	Nation	Match	Won	Lost	Points
1	Germany	2	2	0	4
2	Scotland	2	1	1	2
3	Jamaica	2	0	2	0

=== Pool H ===
November 27, 2017

India	3	-	0	Austria

November 28, 2017

Malaysia	2	-	1	India

November 29, 2017

Malaysia	3	-	0	Austria

Rank	Nation	Match	Won	Lost	Points
1	Malaysia	2	2	0	4
2	India	2	1	1	2
3	Austria	2	0	2	0

== Finals ==
=== Draw ===
Round of 16
1	Egypt	3	3	2
15	Finland	0	1	0
10	Scotland	3	2	3
9	Malaysia	1	3	2
3	France	3	3	2
13	Wales	0	0	0
5	Hong Kong	3	1	3
11	United States	1	3	0
6	New Zealand	3	3	1
12	Spain	1	1	2
4	Australia	3	3	2
14	Canada	0	0	0
8	India	3	2	3
7	Germany	0	3	0
2	England	3	3	2
16	Switzerland	0	2	0

Quarterfinals
1	Egypt	3	3	3
10	Scotland	0	0	0
5	Hong Kong	1	3	3
3	France	2	2	1
4	Australia	2	3	3
6	New Zealand	3	0	0
2	England	3	3	3
8	India	2	0	1

Semifinals
1	Egypt	3	3
5	Hong Kong	1	2	w/d
2	England	3	3	2
4	Australia	1	0	0

Final
1	Egypt	3	3
2	England	0	0	w/d

== Post-tournament team ranking ==
Position	Team	Result
1st	Egypt	champions
2nd	England	Final
3rd	Australia	Semi Final
3rd	Hong Kong	Semi Final
5th	France	Quarter Final
6th	New Zealand	Quarter Final

Position	Team	Result
7th	India	Quarter Final
8th	Scotland	Quarter Final
9th	Germany	Round of 16
10th	United States	Round of 16
11th	Spain	Round of 16
12th	Malaysia	Round of 16

Position	Team	Result
13th	Canada	Round of 16
14th	Wales	Round of 16
15th	Finland	Round of 16
16th	Switzerland	Round of 16
17th	Argentina	Group Stage
18th	South Africa	Group Stage

Position	Team	Result
19th	Pakistan	Group Stage
20th	Ireland	Group Stage
21st	Czech Republic	Group Stage
22nd	Jamaica	Group Stage
23rd	Iraq	Group Stage
24th	Austria	Group Stage

== See also ==
- 2013 Men's World Team Squash Championships
- 2015 Men's World Team Squash Championships
- Squash
