= 2023 Men's World Team Squash Championships =

Squash tournament

2023 Men's World Squash Team
- 27th WSF World Men's Team Championship
- Location: Tauranga, New Zealand
- Venue: Devoy Squash & Fitness Centre
- Date: 11 – 17 December
- Teams: 24

Results
- Champions: Egypt
- Runners-up: England
- Third place: Switzerland; France

The 2023 Men's World Team Squash Championships was the 27th edition of world men's team championship for squash players. The event was held at the Devoy Squash & Fitness Centre in Tauranga, New Zealand, from 11 to 17 December 2023. The tournament was sanctioned by the World Squash Federation and was the first to be held since 2019 because the 2021 edition had been cancelled due to the COVID-19 pandemic.

Egypt retained the title defeating England in the final, it was Egypt's sixth success.

== Participating teams ==
A total of 24 teams competed from all five confederations.

- Australia
- Canada
- Cook Islands
- Czech Republic
- Egypt
- England
- France
- Germany
- Hong Kong
- Ireland
- Japan
- South Korea
- Malaysia
- Netherlands
- Nigeria
- New Zealand
- Philippines
- Samoa
- Scotland
- South Africa
- Switzerland
- Tahiti
- United States
- Wales

== Results ==
=== Group stage ===
Group A

Pos	Team	P	W	L	Pts	Players
1	Egypt	2	2	0	4	Ali Farag, Mazen Hesham, Youssef Soliman, Mostafa Asal
2	Malaysia	2	1	1	2	Hafiz Zhafri, Ameeshenraj Chandaran, Sanjay Jeeva, Addeen Idrakie
3	Ireland	2	0	2	0	Sam Buckley, Sean Conroy, Oisin Logan

Group B

Pos	Team	P	W	L	Pts	Players
1	England	2	2	0	4	Adrian Waller, Mohamed El Shorbagy, Patrick Rooney, Marwan El Shorbagy
2	South Africa	2	1	1	2	Dewald Van Niekerk, Tristen Worth, Jean-Pierre Brits, Damian Groenewald
3	Philippines	2	0	2	0	Robert Garcia, David William Pelino, Reymark Begornia, Jonathan Reyes

Group C

Pos	Team	P	W	L	Pts	Players
1	France	2	2	0	4	Grégoire Marche, Baptiste Masotti, Auguste Dussourd, Victor Crouin
2	Australia	2	1	1	2	Joseph White, Rhys Dowling, Dylan Molinaro, Nicholas Calvert
3	Netherlands	2	0	2	0	Rowan Damming, Samuel Gerrits, Thijs Roukens, Hjalmer Mols

Group D

Pos	Team	P	W	L	Pts	Players
1	Switzerland	2	2	0	4	Yannick Wilhelmi, Nicolas Müller, Robin Gadola, Dimitri Steinmann
2	Nigeria	2	1	1	2	Babatunde Ajagbe, Onaopemipo Adegoke, Gabriel Olufunmilayo, Samuel Kehinde
3	Japan	2	0	2	0	Shota Yasunari, Yujin Ikeda, Yuta Ando, Naoki Sone

Group E

Pos	Team	P	W	L	Pts	Players
1	United States	2	2	0	4	Andrew Douglas, Timothy Brownell, Shahjahan Khan, Spencer Lovejoy
2	Czech Republic	2	1	1	2	Viktor Byrtus, Daniel Mekbib, Jakub Solnicky
3	Cook Islands	2	0	2	0	Dylan Robert Russell, Brian Tapurau, Manu Priest, Joshua Simeon

Group F

Pos	Team	P	W	L	Pts	Players
1	Wales	2	2	0	4	Owain Taylor, Joel Makin, Emyr Evans, Elliott Morris
2	New Zealand	2	1	1	2	Lwamba Chileshe, Temwa Chileshe, Elijah Thomas, Paul Coll
3	Korea	2	0	2	0	Dong Hyun Ji, Hyeon Beom Kang, Dongjun Lee, Dong Min Lee

Group G

Pos	Team	P	W	L	Pts	Players
1	Scotland	2	2	0	4	Rory Stewart, Greg Lobban, Alasdair Prott, Alan Clyne
2	Canada	2	1	1	2	David Baillargeon, Liam Marrison, Salaheldin Eltorgman, Brett Schille
3	Samoa	2	0	2	0	Onesemo Old, Leo Fatialofa, Donald Geoffrey Marfleet

Group H

Pos	Team	P	W	L	Pts	Players
1	Germany	2	2	0	4	Raphael Kandra, Simon Rösner, Yannik Omlor
2	Hong Kong, China	2	1	1	2	Tang Ming Hong, Lau Tsz Kwan, Henry Leung, Wong Chi Him
3	Tahiti	2	0	2	0	Laurent Loudier, Kevin Pons, Adrien Maury, Kamal Soussi

=== Second Round ===
Team 1	Team 2	Score
Scotland	Hong Kong, China	2–1
England	Malaysia	2–0
Switzerland	Australia	2–0
Egypt	South Africa	2–0
Wales	Czech Republic	2–0
France	Nigeria	2–0
Germany	Canada	2–0
United States	New Zealand	2–1

=== Quarter-finals ===
England
2
Quarter-final 1
Mercury Arena

Germany
0

			1	2	3	4	5
1	(England) (Germany)	Mohamed Elshorbagy; Raphael Kandra	11; 8	11; 7	11; 3
2	(England) (Germany)	Adrian Waller; Valentin Rapp	11; 5	11; 5	11; 2
3	(England) (Germany)	Marwan Elshorbagy; Simon Rösner						not played

Switzerland
2
Quarter-final 2
Devoy Glass

United States
1

			1	2	3	4	5
1	(Switzerland) (United States)	Nicolas Mueller; Timothy Brownell	14; 16	11; 7	11; 8	4; 11	11; 9
2	(Switzerland) (United States)	Yannick Wilhelm; Andrew Douglas	13; 15	16; 18	11; 9	3; 11
3	(Switzerland) (United States)	Dimitri Steinmann; Shahjahan Khan	12; 14	11; 6	11; 4	11; 7

France
2
Quarter-final 3
Mercury Arena

Wales
0

			1	2	3	4	5
1	(France) (Wales)	Victor Crouin; Joel Makin	11; 7	11; 8	9; 11	9; 11	11; 9
2	(France) (Wales)	Auguste Dussourd; Owain Taylor	9; 11	11; 7	11; 7	8; 11	11; 6
3	(France) (Wales)	Baptiste Masotti; Emyr Evans						not played

Egypt
2
Quarter-final 4
Mercury Arena

Scotland
0

			1	2	3	4	5
1	(Egypt) (Scotland)	Ali Farag; Greg Lobban	11; 6	11; 6	11; 6
2	(Egypt) (Scotland)	Mazen Hesham; Alasdair Prott	11; 6	11; 3	11; 5
3	(Egypt) (Scotland)	Mostafa Asal; Rory Stewart						not played

=== Semi-finals ===
England
2
Semi-final 1
Mercury Arena

France
0

			1	2	3	4	5
1	(England) (France)	Mohamed Elshorbagy; Victor Crouin	11; 7	11; 4	11; 4
2	(England) (France)	Marwan Elshorbagy; Gregoire Marche	14; 12	11; 5	11; 7
3	(England) (France)	Patrick Rooney; Auguste Dussourd						not played

Egypt
2
Semi-final 2
Mercury Arena

Switzerland
0

			1	2	3	4	5
1	(Egypt) (Switzerland)	Ali Farag; Nicolas Mueller	11; 5	11; 7	11; 6
2	(Egypt) (Switzerland)	Mazen Hesham; Dimitri Steinmann	11; 8	11; 7	11; 8
3	(Egypt) (Switzerland)	Youssef Soliman; Robin Gadola						not played

=== Final ===
Egypt
2
Final
Mercury Arena

England
0

			1	2	3	4	5
1	(Egypt) (England)	Mostafa Asal; Marwan Elshorbagy	11; 9	11; 9	11; 9
2	(Egypt) (England)	Ali Farag; Mohamed Elshorbagy	8; 11	11; 2	7; 11	11; 8	11; 7
3	(Egypt) (England)	Mazen Hesham; Patrick Rooney						not played

== Final rankings ==
Position	Team
1st place, gold medalist(s)	Egypt
2nd place, silver medalist(s)	England
3rd place, bronze medalist(s)	Switzerland
3rd place, bronze medalist(s)	France
5th	Wales
6th	United States
7th	Scotland
8th	Germany
