= 2024 Men's World Team Squash Championships =

Squash tournament

2024 Men's World Squash Team
- 28th WSF World Men's Team Championship
- Location: Hong Kong
- Venue: Hong Kong Football Club
- Date: 9 – 15 December
- Teams: 26
- Website wsfworldteams.com/en

Results
- Champions: Egypt
- Runners-up: England
- Third place: Switzerland; France

The 2024 Men's World Team Squash Championships was the 28th edition of world men's team championship for squash players. The event was held at the Hong Kong Football Club from 9 to 15 December 2024. The tournament was organized by Hong Kong Squash and sanctioned by the World Squash Federation.

Egypt won their seventh title.

== Participating teams ==
A total of 26 teams competed from all five confederations.

- Australia
- Canada
- China
- Colombia
- Czech Republic
- Egypt
- England
- France
- Germany
- Hong Kong
- India
- Ireland
- Italy
- Japan
- South Korea
- Kuwait
- Malaysia
- Nigeria
- Pakistan
- Peru
- Philippines
- Scotland
- South Africa
- Spain
- Switzerland
- United States

== Results ==
=== Group stage ===
Group A

Pos	Team	P	W	L	Pts	Squad
1	Egypt	2	2	0	4	Ali Farag, Mostafa Asal, Mazen Hesham, Karim Gawad
2	Spain	2	1	1	2	Hugo Varela, Iker Pajares Bernabeu, Ivan Pérez Saavedra, Edmon López
3	Japan	2	0	2	0	Tomotaka Endo, Naoki Hayashi, Shota Yasunari, Ryūnosuke Tsukue

Group B

Pos	Team	P	W	L	Pts	Squad
1	England	2	2	0	4	Mohamed El Shorbagy, Nathan Lake, Curtis Malik, Marwan El Shorbagy
2	Canada	2	1	1	2	David Baillargeon, Salaheldin Eltorgman, Connor Turk, Graeme Schnell
3	Nigeria	2	0	2	0	Babatunde Ajagbe, Onaopemipo Adegoke, Gabriel Olufunmilayo, Samuel Kehinde

Group C

Pos	Team	P	W	L	Pts	Squad
1	France	2	2	0	4	Victor Crouin, Baptiste Masotti, Sébastien Bonmalais, Grégoire Marche
2	Czech Republic	2	1	1	2	Viktor Byrtus, Jakub Solnicky, Daniel Mekbib, Ondrej Vorlicek
3	South Korea	2	0	2	0	Jeong-Min Ryu, Joo Young Na, Minwoo Lee, Seojin Oh

Group D

Pos	Team	P	W	L	Pts	Squad
1	Switzerland	2	2	0	4	Dimitri Steinmann, Yannick Wilhelmi, Robin Gadola, Nicolas Müller
2	South Africa	2	1	1	2	Dewald van Niekerk, Damian Groenewald, Ruan Olivier, Luhann Groenewald
3	Australia	2	0	2	0	Joseph White, Rhys Dowling, Dylan Molinaro, Brendan MacDonald

Group E

Pos	Team	P	W	L	Pts	Squad
1	Malaysia	2	2	0	4	Ng Eain Yow, Sanjay Jeeva, Addeen Idrakie, Mohd Syafiq Kamal
2	Scotland	2	1	1	2	Rory Stewart, Alasdair Prott, Martin Ross, Greg Lobban
3	Philippines	2	0	2	0	Reymark Begornia, David William Pelino, Christopher Buraga, Jonathan Reyes

Group F

Pos	Team	P	W	L	Pts	Squad
1	Colombia	2	2	0	4	Miguel Ángel Rodríguez, Juan Camilo Vargas, Ronald Palomino, Matías Knudsen
2	India	2	1	1	2	Abhay Singh, Velavan Senthilkumar, Veer Chotrani, Suraj Chand
3	Ireland	2	0	2	0	Sam Buckley, Conor Moran, Oisin Logan, Michael Creaven

Group G

Pos	Team	P	W	L	Pts	Squad
1	United States	3	3	0	6	Spencer Lovejoy, Nicholas Spizzirri, Dillon Huang, Timothy Brownell
2	Germany	3	2	1	4	Raphael Kandra, Yannik Omlor, Valentin Rapp,Simon Rösner
3	Kuwait	3	1	2	2	Athbi Hamad, Mohammad Al Khanfar, Jassim Adel Al Ghareeb, Abdul Rahman Mohamad Al Maghrabi
4	China	3	0	3	0	Li Haizhen, Zhou Penglin, Zhang Guanyu, Nirui Yang

Group H

Pos	Team	P	W	L	Pts	Squad
1	Pakistan	3	3	0	6	Asim Khan, Noor Zaman, Nasir Iqbal
2	Hong Kong	3	2	1	4	Lau Tsz Kwan, Hney Leung, Tang Ming Hong, Wong Chi Him
3	Peru	3	1	2	2	Diego Elías, Alonso Escudero, Rafael Galvez
4	Italy	3	0	3	0	Omar Zaki Masoud, Filippo Conti, Lorenzo Staurengo, Daniele De Bartolomeo

=== Second Round ===
Team 1	Team 2	Score
Egypt	Canada	2–0
Germany	Pakistan	2–1
France	South Africa	2–0
India	Malaysia	2–1
Colombia	Scotland	2–1
Switzerland	Czech Republic	2–0
Hong Kong, China	United States	2–1
England	Spain	2–1

=== Quarter-finals ===
France
2
Quarter-final 1
Sportshall

India
0

			1	2	3	4	5
1	(France) (India)	Victor Crouin; Abhay Singh	11; 7	11; 4	11; 4
2	(France) (India)	Baptiste Masotti; Velavan Senthilkumar						not played
3	(France) (India)	Sebastien Bonmalais; Veer Chotrani	13; 11	11; 7	11; 7

Egypt
2
Quarter-final 2
Showcase Pavilion

Germany
0

			1	2	3	4	5
1	(Egypt) (Germany)	Ali Farag; Raphael Kandra	11; 2	6; 11	11; 5	11; 5
2	(Egypt) (Germany)	Mazen Hesham; Yannik Omlor						not played
3	(Egypt) (Germany)	Karim Abdel Gawad; Valentin Rapp	11; 4	11; 9	11; 4

Colombia
1
Quarter-final 3
Sportshall

Switzerland
2

			1	2	3	4	5
1	(Colombia) (Switzerland)	Miguel Ángel Rodríguez; Dimitri Steinmann	11; 6	11; 7	6; 11	8; 11	11; 9
2	(Colombia) (Switzerland)	Ronald Palomino; Nicolas Mueller	11; 9	2; 11	5; 11	8; 11
3	(Colombia) (Switzerland)	Matías Knudsen; Yannick Wilhelmi	7; 11	6; 11	9; 11

Hong Kong
0
Quarter-final 4
Court7

England
2

			1	2	3	4	5
1	(Hong Kong) (England)	Tsz Kwan Lau; Mohamed Elshorbagy	9; 11	4; 11	10; 12
2	(Hong Kong) (England)	Henry Leung; Marwan Elshorbagy						not played
3	(Hong Kong) (England)	Chi Him Wong; Curtis Malik	11; 6	7; 11	6; 11	3; 11

=== Semi-finals ===
Egypt
2
Semi-final 1
Showcase Pavilion

France
1

			1	2	3	4	5
1	(Egypt) (France)	Ali Farag; Victor Crouin	1; 11	6; 11	12; 10	11; 4	11; 6
2	(Egypt) (France)	Mostafa Asal; Baptiste Masotti	11; 8	11; 4	11; 9
3	(Egypt) (France)	Mazen Hesham; Sébastien Bonmalais	9; 11	11; 7	5; 11

England
2
Semi-final 2
Showcase Pavilion

Switzerland
0

			1	2	3	4	5
1	(England) (Switzerland)	Mohamed El Shorbagy; Dimitri Steinmann	11; 2	11; 4	3; 11	11; 4
2	(England) (Switzerland)	Marwan El Shorbagy; Nicolas Müller	11; 9	11; 9	11; 5
3	(England) (Switzerland)	Curtis Malik; Yannick Wilhelmi						not played

=== Final ===
Egypt
2
Final
Showcase Pavilion

England
0

			1	2	3	4	5
1	(Egypt) (England)	Mazen Hesham; Curtis Malik	4; 11	13; 11	6; 11	11; 6	11; 8
2	(Egypt) (England)	Ali Farag; Mohamed El Shorbagy	6; 11	13; 8	11; 9
3	(Egypt) (England)	Mostafa Asal; Marwan El Shorbagy						not played

== Final rankings ==
Position	Team
1st place, gold medalist(s)	Egypt
2nd place, silver medalist(s)	England
3rd place, bronze medalist(s)	Switzerland
3rd place, bronze medalist(s)	France
5th	India
6th	Hong Kong
7th	Germany
8th	Colombia
9th	Malaysia
10th	Scotland

Source: WSF

== See also ==
- 2024 Women's World Team Squash Championships
