= 2024 PSA Men's World Squash Championship =

Squash tournament in Cairo

2024 Men's World Championship
- 45th PSA Men's World Squash Championship
- Location: Cairo, Egypt
- Venue: National Museum of Egyptian Civilization; Palm Hills Club
- Date: 9–18 May 2024
- Website https://worldsquashchamps.com/
- Category: PSA World Championships
- Prize money: $565,000

Results
- Champion: (Peru) Diego Elías
- Runner-up: (Egypt) Mostafa Asal
- Semi-finalists: (Egypt) Ali Farag (New Zealand) Paul Coll

The 2024 PSA Men's World Squash Championship was the 2024 men's edition of the World Squash Championships, which served as the individual world championship for squash players. The event took place in Cairo, Egypt from 9 to 18 May 2024. It was the sixth time that Cairo host the PSA World Championships after 1985, 1999, 2006, 2016 & 2022 editions.

The top four seeds progressed to the semi-finals, where third seed Diego Elías defeated the defending champion Ali Farag and fourth seed Mostafa Asal knocked out second seed Paul Coll. Elías then defeated Asal in the final.

== World ranking points/prize money ==
PSA also awards points towards World ranking. Points are awarded as follows:

PSA World Squash Championships		Ranking Points						
Rank	Prize money US$	Winner	Runner up	3/4	5/8	9/16	17/32	33/64
World Squash Championships	$565,000	3175	2090	1270	780	475	290	177.5

=== Prize money breakdown ===
Total prize money for the tournament is $1,130,000, $565,000 per gender. This is about a 1.5% prize fund increase from previous World Championships (2022–23; $550,000 per gender).

Position (num. of players)		% breakdown	Prize money (Total: $565,000)
Winner	(1)	16%	$90,400
Runner-up	(1)	10%	$56,500
3/4	(2)	6%	$33,900
5/8	(4)	3.50%	$19,775
9/16	(8)	2%	$11,300
17/32	(16)	1%	$5,650
33/64	(32)	0.50%	$2,825

== Venues ==
National Museum of Egyptian Civilization and Palm Hills Club in Cairo are the two venues that hoste the competition.

National Museum of Egyptian Civilization	Palm Hills Club
2024 PSA Men's World Squash Championship (Cairo Giza)

== Seeds ==
Click on the seed number of a player to go to their draw section.

1. (Egypt) Ali Farag (semi finals)
2. (New Zealand) Paul Coll (semi finals)
3. (Peru) Diego Elías (champion)
4. (Egypt) Mostafa Asal (runner-up)
5. (Egypt) Karim Abdel Gawad (Quarter finals)
6. (Egypt) Mazen Hesham (Quarter finals)
7. (England) Mohamed El Shorbagy (Quarter finals)
8. (Egypt) Tarek Momen (Quarter finals)

9. (England) Marwan El Shorbagy (Third Round)
10. (Wales) Joel Makin (Third Round)
11. (France) Victor Crouin (Third Round)
12. (Egypt) Youssef Soliman (Third Round)
13. (France) Baptiste Masotti (First round)
14. (Egypt) Aly Abou Eleinen (Second round)
15. (Colombia) Miguel Á Rodríguez (First round)
16. (Egypt) Youssef Ibrahim (Third Round)

== Draw and results ==
=== Key ===
- rtd. = Retired
- Q = Qualifier
- WC = Host wild card
- w/o = Walkover

=== Finals ===
Semi finals
1	(Egypt) Ali Farag	5	8	11	7
3	(Peru) Diego Elías	11	11	7	11
4	(Egypt) Mostafa Asal	11	11	8	3	12
2	(New Zealand) Paul Coll	7	6	11	11	10

Final
3	(Peru) Diego Elías	11	11	12
4	(Egypt) Mostafa Asal	6	5	10

=== Top half ===
==== Section 1 ====
First round
1	(Egypt) Ali Farag	8	11	11	11
(United States) Todd Harrity	11	3	1	5
(Scotland) Greg Lobban	11	11	11
WC	(Egypt) Mazen Gamal	2	4	4
(Portugal) Rui Soares	11	11	5	8	11
Q	(Egypt) Moustafa El Sirty	8	8	11	11	8
(Argentina) Leandro Romiglio	12	11	11
15	(Colombia) Miguel Á Rodríguez	10	7	7
11	(France) Victor Crouin	11	11	10	11
(United States) Andrew Douglas	7	4	12	5
(England) Simon Herbert	11	11	12
(Hong Kong) Henry Leung	8	9	10
(Egypt) Karim El Hammamy	6	11	11	4	9
(Malaysia) Addeen Idrakie	11	9	8	11	11
(England) George Parker	3	5	6
8	(Egypt) Tarek Momen	11	11	11

Second round
1	(Egypt) Ali Farag	11	11	11
(Scotland) Greg Lobban	5	6	6
(Portugal) Rui Soares	4	5	8
(Argentina) Leandro Romiglio	11	11	11
11	(France) Victor Crouin	7	11	13	12
(England) Simon Herbert	11	3	11	10
(Malaysia) Addeen Idrakie	1	4	7
8	(Egypt) Tarek Momen	11	11	11

Third Round
1	(Egypt) Ali Farag	11	11	11
(Argentina) Leandro Romiglio	6	3	3
11	(France) Victor Crouin	11	8	2	1
8	(Egypt) Tarek Momen	7	11	11	11

Quarter finals
1	(Egypt) Ali Farag	11	11	11
8	(Egypt) Tarek Momen	3	8	6

==== Section 2 ====
First round
5	(Egypt) Karim Abdel Gawad	11	11	11
(United States) Timothy Brownell	8	3	7
(Scotland) Rory Stewart	11	11	11
(Switzerland) Yannick Wilhelmi	7	4	6
(Switzerland) Dimitri Steinmann	11	11	6	11
(Egypt) Mohamed ElSherbini	4	5	11	3
(France) Sébastien Bonmalais	6	11	1	13
14	(Egypt) Aly Abou Eleinen	11	9	11	15
16	(Egypt) Youssef Ibrahim	11	11	14
(United States) Shahjahan Khan	2	9	12
(Egypt) Ibrahim Elkabbani	11	10	6	11	2
(Colombia) Juan Camilo Vargas	5	12	11	8	11
(Spain) Iker Pajares	11	12	11
(England) Tom Walsh	5	10	7
(Qatar) Abdulla Al-Tamimi	2	3	6
3	(Peru) Diego Elías	11	11	11

Second round
5	(Egypt) Karim Abdel Gawad	11	11	11
(Scotland) Rory Stewart	5	6	7
(Switzerland) Dimitri Steinmann	11	11	11	3	14
14	(Egypt) Aly Abou Eleinen	13	8	7	11	12
16	(Egypt) Youssef Ibrahim	10	9	11	13	13
(Colombia) Juan Camilo Vargas	12	11	5	11	11
(Spain) Iker Pajares	4	5	4
3	(Peru) Diego Elías	11	11	11

Third Round
5	(Egypt) Karim Abdel Gawad	9	11	11	11
(Switzerland) Dimitri Steinmann	11	8	8	9
16	(Egypt) Youssef Ibrahim	2	3	2
3	(Peru) Diego Elías	11	11	11

Quarter finals
5	(Egypt) Karim Abdel Gawad	5	1	6
3	(Peru) Diego Elías	11	11	11

=== Bottom half ===
==== Section 3 ====
First round
4	(Egypt) Mostafa Asal	11	11	11
(Spain) Bernat Jaume	9	8	7
(Switzerland) Nicolas Müller	11	11	5	11
(Pakistan) Hamza Khan	9	6	11	6
(England) Curtis Malik	11	5	11	3	12
(Egypt) Mohamed Abouelghar	5	11	3	11	10
(Germany) Raphael Kandra	4	7	6
10	(Wales) Joel Makin	11	11	11
12	(Egypt) Youssef Soliman	11	11	11
(Egypt) Omar Mosaad	7	8	7
(Egypt) Yahya Elnawasany	14	11	11	11
Q	(Australia) Joseph White	16	5	6	6
(France) Grégoire Marche	7	10	11
(France) Lucas Serme	11	12	13
(Hungary) Balázs Farkas	12	5	2
6	(Egypt) Mazen Hesham	14	11	11

Second round
4	(Egypt) Mostafa Asal	11	11	11
(Switzerland) Nicolas Müller	2	3	4
(England) Curtis Malik	11	5	7
10	(Wales) Joel Makin	13	11	11
12	(Egypt) Youssef Soliman	11	11	11
(Egypt) Yahya Elnawasany	2	7	5
(France) Lucas Serme	8	10	8
6	(Egypt) Mazen Hesham	11	12	11

Third Round
4	(Egypt) Mostafa Asal	11	11	9	11
10	(Wales) Joel Makin	2	4	11	9
12	(Egypt) Youssef Soliman	7	3	7
6	(Egypt) Mazen Hesham	11	11	11

Quarter finals
4	(Egypt) Mostafa Asal	11	2	11	11
6	(Egypt) Mazen Hesham	4	11	8	3

==== Section 4 ====
First round
7	(England) Mohamed El Shorbagy	11	11	12
Q	(Czech Republic) Martin Švec	4	4	10
(India) Ramit Tandon	11	11	11
(United States) Faraz Khan	1	3	3
(Canada) David Baillargeon	8	8	7
(Egypt) Fares Dessouky	11	11	11
(France) Auguste Dussourd	2	8	9
9	(England) Marwan El Shorbagy	11	11	11
13	(France) Baptiste Masotti	9	8	5
(Malaysia) Eain Yow	11	11	11
Q	(Japan) Ryūnosuke Tsukue	11	11	11
Q	(United States) Spencer Lovejoy	5	4	7
(Mexico) César Salazar	16	9	3
(Mexico) Leonel Cárdenas	18	11	11
(Hong Kong) Alex Lau	1	5	5
2	(New Zealand) Paul Coll	11	11	11

Second round
7	(England) Mohamed El Shorbagy	11	4
(India) Ramit Tandon	8	3^{rtd.}
(Egypt) Fares Dessouky	6	5	6
9	(England) Marwan El Shorbagy	11	11	11
(Malaysia) Eain Yow	11	11	11
Q	(Japan) Ryūnosuke Tsukue	1	5	9
(Mexico) Leonel Cárdenas	6	5	4
2	(New Zealand) Paul Coll	11	11	11

Third Round
7	(England) Mohamed El Shorbagy	8	11	11	11
9	(England) Marwan El Shorbagy	11	5	7	9
(Malaysia) Eain Yow	9	4	6
2	(New Zealand) Paul Coll	11	11	11

Quarter finals
7	(England) Mohamed El Shorbagy	12	6	2
2	(New Zealand) Paul Coll	14	11	11

== Schedule ==
Times are Eastern European Summer Time (UTC+03:00). To the best of five games.

Abbreviations:

- NMEC - National Museum of Egyptian Civilization
- PHC - Palm Hills Club (glass court & courts 1, 2, 3, 4)

=== Round 1 ===
Thursday, 9 May

Date	Court	Time	Player 1	Player 2	Score
9 May	PHC, Court 1	12:45	Youssef Ibrahim (EGY)	Shahjahan Khan (USA)	11–2, 11–9, 14–12
9 May	PHC, Court 2	12:45	Dimitri Steinmann (SUI)	Mohamed ElSherbini (EGY)	11–4, 11–5, 6–11, 11–3
9 May	PHC, Court 3	12:45	Karim El Hammamy (EGY)	Addeen Idrakie (MYS)	11–6, 9–11, 8–11, 11–4, 11–9
9 May	PHC, Court 4	12:45	Rui Soares (POR)	Moustafa El Sirty (EGY)	11–8, 11–8, 5–11, 8–11, 11–8
9 May	PHC, Court 1	14:15	Ibrahim Elkabbani (EGY)	Juan Camilo Vargas (COL)	5–11, 12–10, 11–6, 8–11, 11–2
9 May	PHC, Court 2	14:15	Sébastien Bonmalais (FRA)	Aly Abou Eleinen (EGY)	11–6, 9–11, 11–1, 15–13
9 May	PHC, Court 3	14:15	George Parker (ENG)	Tarek Momen (EGY)	11–3, 11–5, 11–6
9 May	PHC, Court 4	14:15	Leandro Romiglio (ARG)	Miguel Á Rodríguez (COL)	12–10, 11–7, 11–7
9 May	PHC, Court 2	16:00	Karim Abdel Gawad (EGY)	Timothy Brownell (USA)	11–8, 11–3, 11–7
9 May	PHC, Court 4	16:00	Victor Crouin (FRA)	Andrew Douglas (USA)	11–7, 11–4, 10–12, 11–5
9 May	PHC, Court 1	16:45	Iker Pajares (ESP)	Tom Walsh (ENG)	11–5, 12–10, 11–7
9 May	PHC, Court 3	16:45	Greg Lobban (SCO)	Mazen Gamal (EGY)	11–2, 11–4, 11–4
9 May	PHC, Court 2	17:30	Rory Stewart (SCO)	Yannick Wilhelmi (SUI)	11–7, 11–4, 11–6
9 May	PHC, Court 4	17:30	Simon Herbert (ENG)	Henry Leung (HKG)	11–8, 11–9, 12–10
9 May	PHC, Glass Court	20:15	Ali Farag (EGY)	Todd Harrity (USA)	8–11, 11–3, 11–1, 11–5
9 May	PHC, Glass Court	21:45	Abdulla Al-Tamimi (QAT)	Diego Elías (PER)	11–2, 11–3, 11–6

——————————————————————————————————————————————————————————————————————————————————————————————————————————

Friday, 10 May

Date	Court	Time	Player 1	Player 2	Score
10 May	PHC, Court 1	12:45	David Baillargeon (CAN)	Fares Dessouky (EGY)	11–8, 11–7, 11–7
10 May	PHC, Court 2	12:45	Ryūnosuke Tsukue (JPN)	Spencer Lovejoy (USA)	11–5, 11–4, 11–7
10 May	PHC, Court 3	12:45	Youssef Soliman (EGY)	Omar Mosaad (EGY)	11–7, 11–8, 11–7
10 May	PHC, Court 4	12:45	Yahya Elnawasany (EGY)	Joseph White (AUS)	14–16, 11–5, 11–6, 11–6
10 May	PHC, Court 1	14:15	Auguste Dussourd (FRA)	Marwan El Shorbagy (ENG)	11–2, 11–8, 11–9
10 May	PHC, Court 2	14:15	Baptiste Masotti (FRA)	Eain Yow (MYS)	11–9, 11–8, 11–5
10 May	PHC, Court 3	14:15	Grégoire Marche (FRA)	Lucas Serme (FRA)	11–7, 12–10, 13–11
10 May	PHC, Court 4	14:15	Raphael Kandra (GER)	Joel Makin (WAL)	11–4, 11–7, 11–6
10 May	PHC, Court 2	16:00	Mohamed El Shorbagy (ENG)	Martin Švec (CZE)	11–4, 11–4, 12–10
10 May	PHC, Court 4	16:00	Curtis Malik (ENG)	Mohamed Abouelghar (EGY)	11–5, 5–11, 11–3, 3–11, 12–10
10 May	PHC, Court 1	16:45	César Salazar (MEX)	Leonel Cárdenas (MEX)	18–16, 11–9, 11–3
10 May	PHC, Court 3	16:45	Balázs Farkas (HUN)	Mazen Hesham (EGY)	14–12, 11–5, 11–2
10 May	PHC, Court 2	17:30	Ramit Tandon (IND)	Faraz Khan (USA)	11–1, 11–3, 11–3
10 May	PHC, Court 4	17:30	Nicolas Müller (SUI)	Hamza Khan (PAK)	11–9, 11–6, 5–11, 11–6
10 May	PHC, Glass Court	20:15	Alex Lau (HKG)	Paul Coll (NZL)	11–1, 11–5, 11–5
10 May	PHC, Glass Court	21:45	Mostafa Asal (EGY)	Bernat Jaume (ESP)	11–9, 11–8, 11–7

=== Round 2 ===
Saturday, 11 May

Date	Court	Time	Player 1	Player 2	Score
11 May	PHC, Court 2	12:45	Youssef Ibrahim (EGY)	Juan Camilo Vargas (COL)	10–12, 9–11, 11–5, 13–11, 13–11
11 May	PHC, Court 3	12:45	Rui Soares (POR)	Leandro Romiglio (ARG)	11–4, 11–5, 11–8
11 May	PHC, Court 2	14:15	Dimitri Steinmann (SUI)	Aly Abou Eleinen (EGY)	11–13, 11–8, 11–7, 3–11, 14–12
11 May	PHC, Court 3	14:15	Victor Crouin (FRA)	Simon Herbert (ENG)	7–11, 11–3, 13–11, 12–10
11 May	PHC, Court 2	16:45	Karim Abdel Gawad (EGY)	Rory Stewart (SCO)	11–5, 11–6, 11–7
11 May	PHC, Court 3	16:45	Addeen Idrakie (MYS)	Tarek Momen (EGY)	11–1, 11–4, 11–7
11 May	PHC, Glass Court	20:15	Ali Farag (EGY)	Greg Lobban (SCO)	11–5, 11–6, 11–6
11 May	PHC, Glass Court	21:45	Iker Pajares (ESP)	Diego Elías (PER)	11–4, 11–5, 11–4

——————————————————————————————————————————————————————————————————————————————————————————————————————————

Sunday, 12 May

Date	Court	Time	Player 1	Player 2	Score
12 May	PHC, Court 2	12:45	Curtis Malik (ENG)	Joel Makin (WAL)	13–11, 11–5, 11–7
12 May	PHC, Court 3	12:45	Youssef Soliman (EGY)	Yahya Elnawasany (EGY)	11–2, 11–7, 11–5
12 May	PHC, Court 2	14:15	Eain Yow (MYS)	Ryūnosuke Tsukue (JPN)	11–1, 11–5, 11–9
12 May	PHC, Court 3	14:15	Lucas Serme (FRA)	Mazen Hesham (EGY)	11–8, 12–10, 11–8
12 May	PHC, Court 2	16:45	Mohamed El Shorbagy (ENG)	Ramit Tandon (IND)	11–8, 4–3 ret.
12 May	PHC, Court 3	16:45	Fares Dessouky (EGY)	Marwan El Shorbagy (ENG)	11–6, 11–5, 11–6
12 May	PHC, Glass Court	20:15	Leonel Cárdenas (MEX)	Paul Coll (NZL)	11–6, 11–5, 11–4
12 May	PHC, Glass Court	21:45	Mostafa Asal (EGY)	Nicolas Müller (SUI)	11–2, 11–3, 11–4

=== Round 3 ===
Monday, 13 & Tuesday 14 May

Date	Court	Time	Player 1	Player 2	Score
13 May	Court NMEC	19:45	Ali Farag (EGY)	Leandro Romiglio (ARG)	11–6, 11–3, 11–3
13 May	PHC, Glass Court	20:15	Victor Crouin (FRA)	Tarek Momen (EGY)	7–11, 11–8, 11–2, 11–1
13 May	Court NMEC	21:15	Youssef Ibrahim (EGY)	Diego Elías (PER)	11–2, 11–3, 11–2
13 May	PHC, Glass Court	21:45	Karim Abdel Gawad (EGY)	Dimitri Steinmann (SUI)	9–11, 11–8, 11–8, 11–9
14 May	Court NMEC	19:45	Eain Yow (MYS)	Paul Coll (NZL)	11–9, 11–4, 11–6
14 May	PHC, Glass Court	20:15	Youssef Soliman (EGY)	Mazen Hesham (EGY)	11–7, 11–3, 11–7
14 May	Court NMEC	21:15	Mostafa Asal (EGY)	Joel Makin (WAL)	11–2, 11–4, 9–11, 11–9
14 May	PHC, Glass Court	21:45	Mohamed El Shorbagy (ENG)	Marwan El Shorbagy (ENG)	8–11, 11–5, 11–7, 11–9

=== Quarter-finals ===
Wednesday, 15 May

Date	Court	Time	Player 1	Player 2	Score
15 May	PHC, Glass Court	20:00	Mohamed El Shorbagy (ENG)	Paul Coll (NZL)	14–12, 11–6, 11–2
15 May	Court NMEC	20:15	Ali Farag (EGY)	Tarek Momen (EGY)	11–3, 11–8, 11–6
15 May	PHC, Glass Court	20:45	Mostafa Asal (EGY)	Mazen Hesham (EGY)	11–4, 2–11, 11–8, 11–3
15 May	Court NMEC	21:45	Karim Abdel Gawad (EGY)	Diego Elías (PER)	11–5, 11–1, 11–6

=== Semi-finals ===
Friday, 17 May

Date	Court	Time	Player 1	Player 2	Score
17 May	Court NMEC	Following women's semi-final 1	Ali Farag (EGY)	Diego Elías (PER)	5–11, 8–11, 11–7, 7–11
17 May	Court NMEC	Following women's semi-final 2	Mostafa Asal (EGY)	Paul Coll (NZL)	11–7, 11–6, 8–11, 3–11, 12–10

=== Final ===
Saturday, 18 May

Date	Court	Time	Player 1	Player 2	Score
18 May	Court NMEC	Following women's final	Diego Elías (PER)	Mostafa Asal (EGY)	11–6, 11–5, 12–10

== Representation ==
This table shows the number of players by country in the 2024 PSA Men's World Championship. A total of 24 nationalities are represented. Egypt is the most represented nation with 17 players.

	(Egypt) EGY	(Peru) PER	(New Zealand) NZL	(England) ENG	(France) FRA	(Switzerland) SUI	(Malaysia) MYS	(Argentina) ARG	(Wales) WAL	(Scotland) SCO	(Colombia) COL	(Mexico) MEX	(Spain) ESP	(India) IND	(Japan) JPN	(United States) USA	(Hong Kong) HKG	(Australia) AUS	(Canada) CAN	(Czech Republic) CZE	(Hungary) HUN	(Pakistan) PAK	(Qatar) QAT	(Portugal) POR	Total
Final	1	1	0																						2
Semi-final	2	1	1	0																					4
Quarter-final	5	1	1	1	0																				8
Round 3	7	2	1	1	1	1	1	1	1	0															16
Round 2	10	4	1	1	2	2	2	1	1	2	1	1	1	1	1	0									32
Total	17	6	1	1	5	3	2	1	1	2	2	2	2	1	1	6	2	1	1	1	1	1	1	1	64

== See also ==
- World Squash Championships
- 2024 PSA Women's World Squash Championship

Preceded by Chicago (USA); 2023	PSA World Championships; Cairo (Egypt); 2024	Succeeded by Chicago (USA); 2025
