= 2024 European Squash Team Championships =

Squash tournament

- 50th
- Location: (Switzerland) Uster
- Venue: Squash Arena and Sportcenter Blue Point
- Date: 1 – 4 May
- Website europeansquash.com

Results
- Champions: Men (England) England; Women Belgium

The 2024 European Squash Team Championships was the 50th edition of European Squash Team Championships for squash players. The event was held at the Squash Arena and Sportcenter Blue Point in Uster, Switzerland from 1 to 4 May 2024. The tournament was organised by the Swiss Squash and sanctioned by the European Squash Federation.

The England men's team won their 44th title and the Belgium women's team won their first ever title.

== Men's tournament ==
=== Group stage ===
Group A

Pos	Team	P	W	L	Pts
1	England	3	3	0	6
2	Wales	3	2	1	4
3	Spain	3	1	2	2
4	(Republic of Ireland) Ireland	3	0	3	0

Group B

Pos	Team	P	W	L	Pts
1	France	3	3	0	6
2	Switzerland	3	2	1	4
3	Germany	3	1	2	2
4	Czech Republic	3	0	3	0

=== Semi-finals ===
England
3
Semi-final 1

Switzerland
0

			1	2	3	4	5
1	(England) (Switzerland)	Curtis Malik; Yannick Wilhelmi	15; 13	11; 7	11; 9
2	(England) (Switzerland)	Mohamed El Shorbagy; Nicolas Müller	11; 9	11; 4	11; 3
3	(England) (Switzerland)	Marwan El Shorbagy; Dimitri Steinmann	11; 4	7; 11	12; 10	9; 11	11; 9
4	(England) (Switzerland)	Ben Smith; Robin Gadola						not played

France
3
Semi-final 2

Wales
1

			1	2	3	4	5
1	(France) (Wales)	Sébastien Bonmalais; Elliott Morris	11; 7	11; 6	11; 1
2	(France) (Wales)	Victor Crouin; Joel Makin	9; 11	5; 11	11; 7	8; 11
3	(France) (Wales)	Grégoire Marche; Rhys Evans	11; 5	11; 4
4	(France) (Wales)	Baptiste Masotti; Emyr Evans	11; 6	11; 7	11; 3

=== Third place ===
Switzerland
2
Third place

Wales
1

			1	2	3	4	5
1	(Switzerland) (Wales)	Yannick Wilhelmi; Owain Taylor	17; 15	11; 7	8; 11	11; 2
2	(Switzerland) (Wales)	Nicolas Müller; Joel Makin	14; 12	11; 9	11; 9
3	(Switzerland) (Wales)	Robin Gadola; Elliott Morris	10; 12	4; 11	2; 11
4	(Switzerland) (Wales)	Dimitri Steinmann; Emyr Evans	11; 4	5; 11	7; 11	11; 5

=== Final ===
England
2 (8)
Final

France
2 (7)

			1	2	3	4	5
1	(England) (France)	Curtis Malik; Sébastien Bonmalais	8; 11	10; 12	11; 4	12; 10	4; 11
2	(England) (France)	Mohamed El Shorbagy; Victor Crouin	11; 5	11; 6	11; 0
3	(England) (France)	Tom Walsh; Grégoire Marche	7; 11	10; 12	6; 11
4	(England) (France)	Marwan El Shorbagy; Baptiste Masotti	7; 11	11; 9	11; 8	12; 10

== Women's tournament ==
=== Group stage ===
Group A

Pos	Team	P	W	L	Pts
1	England	3	3	0	6
2	France	3	2	1	4
3	Spain	3	1	2	2
4	Czech Republic	3	0	3	0

Group B

Pos	Team	P	W	L	Pts
1	Belgium	3	3	0	6
2	Wales	3	2	1	4
3	Scotland	3	1	2	2
4	Switzerland	3	0	3	0

=== Semi-finals ===
England
2
Semi-final 1

Wales
0

			1	2	3	4	5
1	(England) (Wales)	Gina Kennedy; Tesni Evans	11; 9	11; 3	11; 1
2	(England) (Wales)	Jasmine Hutton; Lowri Roberts	11; 7	11; 4	11; 7
3	(England) (Wales)	Sarah-Jane Perry; Emily Whitlock						not played

Belgium
2
Semi-final 2

France
1

			1	2	3	4	5
1	(Belgium) (France)	Nele Gilis; Marie Stephan	11; 5	11; 6	11; 7
2	(Belgium) (France)	Chloe Crabbe; Lauren Baltayan	9; 11	12; 14	11; 5	3; 11
3	(Belgium) (France)	Tinne Gilis; Énora Villard	11; 7	11; 5	11; 4

=== Third place ===
Wales
2
Third place

France
1

			1	2	3	4	5
1	(Wales) (France)	Tesni Murphy; Marie Stephan	11; 3	5; 11	11; 4	11; 8
2	(Wales) (France)	Lowri Roberts; Lauren Baltayan	9; 11	5; 11	9
3	(Wales) (France)	Emily Whitlock; Énora Villard	9; 11	11; 6	11; 7	11; 7

=== Final ===
Belgium
2
Final

England
1

			1	2	3	4	5
1	(Belgium) (England)	Nele Gilis; Gina Kennedy	11; 2	11; 8	11; 13	11; 5
2	(Belgium) (England)	Marie Van Riet; Lucy Turmel	8; 11	7; 11	2; 11
3	(Belgium) (England)	Tinne Gilis; Jasmine Hutton	11; 8	12; 10	11; 2
