= 2023 European Squash Team Championships =

Squash tournament

- 49th
- Location: (Finland) Helsinki
- Venue: Pitäjänmäki show court - Cultural Square of the Mall of Tripla
- Date: 26 – 29 April
- Website europeansquash.com

Results
- Champions: Men England; Women England

The 2023 European Squash Team Championships was the 49th edition of European Squash Team Championships for squash players. The event was held at Pitäjänmäki and the show court was situated at the Cultural Square of the Mall of Tripla in Helsinki, Finland, from 26 to 29 April 2023. The tournament was organised by the European Squash Federation.

The England men's team won their 43rd title and the England women's team won their 42nd title.

== Men's tournament ==
=== Group stage ===
Group A

Pos	Team	P	W	D	L	Pts
1	England	4	4	0	0	8
2	Wales	4	2	1	1	5
3	Germany	4	2	1	1	5
4	Hungary	4	0	1	3	1
5	Finland	4	0	1	3	1

Group B

Pos	Team	P	W	D	L	Pts
1	France	3	2	1	0	5
2	Switzerland	3	2	1	0	5
3	Spain	3	1	0	2	2
4	Scotland	3	0	0	3	0

=== Semi-finals ===
England
3
Semi-final 1

Switzerland
1

			1	2	3	4	5
1	(England) (Switzerland)	Nick Wall; Robin Gadola	11; 6	11; 4	11; 9
2	(England) (Switzerland)	Mohamed El Shorbagy; Nicolas Müller	11; 5	11; 6	13; 11
3	(England) (Switzerland)	Patrick Rooney; Dimitri Steinmann	7; 11	8; 11	7; 11
4	(England) (Switzerland)	Adrian Waller; Yannick Wilhelmi	11; 8					retired

France
3
Semi-final 2

Wales
0

			1	2	3	4	5
1	(France) (Wales)	Auguste Dussourd; Peter Creed	11; 2	11; 7	11; 4
2	(France) (Wales)	Victor Crouin; Joel Makin	11; 5	11; 8	11; 6
3	(France) (Wales)	Baptiste Masotti; Emyr Evans	11; 8					retired
4	(France) (Wales)	Sébastien Bonmalais; Owain Taylor						not played

=== Third place ===
Switzerland
3
Third place

Wales
1

			1	2	3	4	5
1	(Switzerland) (Wales)	Dimitri Steinmann; Emyr Evans	11; 13	11; 6	11; 1	8; 11	11; 8
2	(Switzerland) (Wales)	Nicolas Müller; Joel Makin	6; 11	5; 11	11; 6	7; 11
3	(Switzerland) (Wales)	Robin Gadola; Eliott Morris	11; 7	11; 6	11; 13
4	(Switzerland) (Wales)	Yannick Wilhelmi; Owain Taylor	11; 8	11; 4	11; 9

=== Final ===
England
2
Final

France
1

			1	2	3	4	5
1	(England) (France)	Patrick Rooney; Grégoire Marche	7; 11	11; 9	11; 9	11; 9
2	(England) (France)	Mohamed El Shorbagy; Victor Crouin	10; 12	12; 10	4; 11	11; 7	14; 12
3	(England) (France)	Nick Wall; Auguste Dussourd	8; 11	12; 10	11; 2	9; 11	9; 11
4	(England) (France)	Adrian Waller; Baptiste Masotti	11; 6	8; 11	6; 11	11; 1

== Women's tournament ==
=== Group stage ===
Group A

Pos	Team	P	W	D	L	Pts
1	England	4	4	0	0	8
2	France	4	3	0	1	6
3	Finland	4	1	0	3	2
4	Germany	4	1	0	3	2
5	Switzerland	4	1	0	3	2

Group B

Pos	Team	P	W	D	L	Pts
1	Belgium	3	3	0	0	6
2	Wales	3	2	0	1	4
3	Spain	3	1	0	2	2
4	Netherlands	3	0	0	3	0

=== Semi-finals ===
England
2
Semi-final 1

Wales
0

			1	2	3	4	5
1	(England) (Wales)	Gina Kennedy; Tesni Evans	11; 1	13; 15	2; 11	11; 4	11; 6
2	(England) (Wales)	Jasmine Hutton; Lowri Roberts	11; 6	11; 4	11; 4
3	(England) (Wales)	Lucy Turmel; Stacey Gooding						not played

Belgium
2
Semi-final 2

France
0

			1	2	3	4	5
1	(Belgium) (France)	Nele Gilis; Mélissa Alves	11; 5	5; 11	11; 5	11; 9
2	(Belgium) (France)	Tinne Gilis; Énora Villard	11; 5	11; 3	11; 4
3	(Belgium) (France)	Chloé Crabb; Marie Stéphan						not played

=== Third place ===
Wales
2
Third place

France
0

			1	2	3	4	5
1	(Wales) (France)	Emily Whitlock; Énora Villard	11; 4	11; 7	11; 7
2	(Wales) (France)	Tesni Evans; Mélissa Alves	11; 9	5; 11	11; 5	11; 5
3	(Wales) (France)	Lowri Roberts; Marie Stéphan						not played

=== Final ===
England
2
Final

Belgium
1

			1	2	3	4	5
1	(England) (Belgium)	Jasmine Hutton; Tinne Gilis	11; 5	13; 11	5; 11	11; 5
2	(England) (Belgium)	Gina Kennedy; Nele Gilis	4; 11	11; 9	9; 11	5; 11
3	(England) (Belgium)	Lucy Turmel; Chloé Crabbé	11; 5	11; 2	11; 6
