= 2025 European Squash Team Championships =

Squash tournament

- 51st
- Location: (Poland) Wrocław
- Venue: Hasta La Vista Center
- Date: 30 April – 3 May
- Website europeansquash.com

Results
- Champions: Men England; Women England

The 2025 European Squash Team Championships was the 51st edition of European Squash Team Championships for squash players. The event was held at the Hasta La Vista Center in Wrocław, Poland from 30 April to 3 May 2025. The tournament was organised by the Polish Squash Association and sanctioned by the European Squash Federation.

The England men's team won their 45th title and the England women's team won their 43rd title.

== Men's tournament ==
=== Group stage ===
Group A

Pos	Team	P	W	L	Pts
1	England	2	2	0	4
2	Scotland	2	1	1	2
3	(Republic of Ireland) Ireland	2	0	2	0

Group B

Pos	Team	P	W	L	Pts
1	France	2	2	0	4
2	Czech Republic	2	1	1	2
3	Hungary	2	0	2	0

Group C

Pos	Team	P	W	L	Pts
1	Switzerland	2	2	0	4
2	Spain	2	1	1	2
3	Israel	2	0	2	0

Group D

Pos	Team	P	W	L	Pts
1	Germany	2	1	1	2
2	Wales	2	1	1	2
3	Belgium	2	0	2	0

=== Quarter Finals ===
Team 1	Team 2	Score
England	Czech Republic	3–0
Switzerland	Wales	3–0
France	Scotland	3–0
Germany	Spain	2–1

=== Semi-finals ===
England
3
Semi-final 1

Germany
0

			1	2	3	4	5
1	(England) (Germany)	Marwan El Shorbagy; Yannik Omlor	11; 9	11; 6	11; 6
2	(England) (Germany)	Mohamed El Shorbagy; Raphael Kandra	11; 6	8; 11	11; 9	12; 10
3	(England) (Germany)	Curtis Malik; Jan Wipperfurth	11; 3	11; 6	11; 5
4	(England) (Germany)	Tom Walsh; Finn-Lennart Koch						not played

France
3
Semi-final 2

Switzerland
0

			1	2	3	4	5
1	(France) (Switzerland)	Grégoire Marche; Nicolas Müller	5; 11	11; 8	11; 6	11; 8
2	(France) (Switzerland)	Victor Crouin; Dimitri Steinmann	11; 9	11; 8	11; 5
3	(France) (Switzerland)	Baptiste Masotti; Yannick Wilhelmi	11; 7	11; 7
4	(France) (Switzerland)	Toufik Mekhalfi; David Bernet						not played

=== Third place ===
Switzerland
4
Third place

Germany
0

			1	2	3	4	5
1	(Switzerland) (Germany)	David Bernet; Valentin Rapp	5; 11	11; 9	8; 11	11; 8	11; 2
2	(Switzerland) (Germany)	Dimitri Steinmann; Raphael Kandra	13; 11	11; 9	12
3	(Switzerland) (Germany)	Yannick Wilhelmi; Yannik Omlor	11; 8
4	(Switzerland) (Germany)	Nicolas Müller; Simon Rösner	11; 8	11; 7	11; 6

=== Final ===
England
3
Final

France
1

			1	2	3	4	5
1	(England) (France)	Curtis Malik; Auguste Dussourd	7; 11	11; 5	11; 2	17; 15
2	(England) (France)	Mohamed El Shorbagy; Victor Crouin	11; 7	6; 11	5; 11	11; 4	6; 11
3	(England) (France)	Jonah Bryant; Baptiste Masotti	11; 4	11; 5	3; 11	11; 8
4	(England) (France)	Marwan El Shorbagy; Grégoire Marche	11; 9

== Women's tournament ==
=== Group stage ===
Group A

Pos	Team	P	W	L	Pts
1	Belgium	2	2	0	4
2	Germany	2	1	1	2
3	Czech Republic	2	0	2	0

Group B

Pos	Team	P	W	L	Pts
1	England	2	2	0	4
2	Spain	2	1	1	2
3	Finland	2	0	2	0

Group C

Pos	Team	P	W	L	Pts
1	Switzerland	2	1	1	2
2	Poland	2	1	1	2
3	Wales	2	0	2	2

Group D

Pos	Team	P	W	L	Pts
1	France	2	1	1	2
2	Scotland	2	1	1	2
3	Denmark	2	0	2	0

=== Quarter Finals ===
Team 1	Team 2	Score
England	Germany	3–0
Scotland	Switzerland	2–1
France	Poland	2–0
Belgium	Spain	2–1

=== Semi-finals ===
England
2
Semi-final 1

France
0

			1	2	3	4	5
1	(England) (France)	Jasmine Hutton; Camille Serme	11; 7	12; 14	8; 11	11; 6	11; 3
2	(England) (France)	Gina Kennedy; Mélissa Alves	11; 7	11; 2	11; 6
3	(England) (France)	Sarah-Jane Perry; Lauren Baltayan						not played

Belgium
2
Semi-final 2

Scotland
0

			1	2	3	4	5
1	(Belgium) (Scotland)	Nele Coll; Ellie Jones	11; 4	11; 3	11; 1
2	(Belgium) (Scotland)	Tinne Gilis; Georgia Adderley	11; 2	11; 7	11; 9
3	(Belgium) (Scotland)	Chloe Crabbe; Robyn McAlpine						not played

=== Third place ===
France
2
Third place

Scotland
0

			1	2	3	4	5
1	(France) (Scotland)	Mélissa Alves; Georgia Adderley	11; 4	11; 6	11; 6
2	(France) (Scotland)	Lauren Baltayan; Ellie Jones	11; 4	11; 7	11; 9
3	(France) (Scotland)	Camille Serme; Alison Thomson						not played

=== Final ===
England
2
Final

Belgium
1

			1	2	3	4	5
1	(England) (Belgium)	Gina Kennedy; Tinne Gilis	6; 11	11; 8	6; 11	12; 14
2	(England) (Belgium)	Sarah-Jane Perry; Chloe Crabbe	11; 6	11; 6	11; 0
3	(England) (Belgium)	Jasmine Hutton; Nele Coll	12; 10	12; 10	9; 11	3; 11	11; 6
