= United States men's national squash team =

- Coach: Nick Taylor
- Association: U.S. Squash
- Colors: Red, Blue & White

World Team Championships
- First year: 1973
- Titles: 0
- Runners-up: 0
- Best finish: 5th
- Entries: 25

Medal record

Pan American Games
Gold medal – first place	2019 Lima	Team
Bronze medal – third place	2011 Guadalajara	Team
Bronze medal – third place	2015 Toronto	Team

The United States men's national squash team represents the United States in international squash team competitions, and is governed by U.S. Squash.

Since 1973, the United States has participated in three quarter finals of the World Squash Team Championships.

== Current team ==
- Todd Harrity
- Shahjahan Khan
- Christopher Gordon
- Chris Hanson
- Faraz Khan
- Andrew Douglas
- Spencer Lovejoy
- Timmy Brownell
- Sam Scherl

== Results ==
=== World Squash Team Championships ===
Year	Result	Position	W	L
(Australia) Melbourne 1967	Did not participated			
(England) Birmingham 1969	Did not participated			
(New Zealand) Palmerston North 1971	Did not participated			
(South Africa) Johannesburg 1973	Group Stage	5th	0	4
(England) Birmingham 1976	Group Stage	9th	1	5
(Canada) Toronto 1977	Group Stage	8th	0	7
(Australia) Brisbane 1979	Group Stage	9th	4	4
(Sweden) Stockholm 1981	Quarter Final	7th	3	3
(New Zealand) Auckland 1983	Group Stage	7th	4	5
(Egypt) Cairo 1985	Group Stage	15th	4	5
(England) London 1987	Group Stage	19th	3	5
Singapore 1989	Group Stage	17th	6	2
(Finland) Helsinki 1991	Group Stage	19th	1	5
(Pakistan) Karachi 1993	Group Stage	26th	2	2
(Egypt) Cairo 1995	Group Stage	25th	5	1
(Malaysia) Petaling Jaya 1997	Group Stage	23rd	4	2
(Egypt) Cairo 1999	Group Stage	18th	4	1
(Australia) Melbourne 2001	Group Stage	19th	2	4
(Austria) Vienna 2003	Group Stage	20th	3	4
(Pakistan) Islamabad 2005	Group Stage	13th	4	3
(India) Chennai 2007	Round of 16	14th	3	4
(Denmark) Odense 2009	Round of 16	12th	2	4
(Germany) Paderborn 2011	Quarter Final	7th	4	3
(France) Mulhouse 2013	Round of 16	12th	3	4
(Egypt) Cairo 2015	Cancelled due to safety concerns			
(France) Marseille 2017	Round of 16	10th	3	3
(United States) Washington 2019	Group Stage	13th	3	2
(Malaysia) Kuala Lumpur 2021	Cancelled due to COVID-19 pandemic			
(New Zealand) Tauranga 2023	Quarter-finals	6th	3	1
Hong Kong 2024	Second Round	14th	3	1
Total	0 Title	25/30	74	84

=== Pan American Games ===
Year	Result	Position	W	L
(Argentina) Mar del Plata 1995	Did not participated			
(Canada) Winnipeg 1999	Did not participated			
(Dominican Republic) Santo Domingo 2003				
(Brazil) Rio de Janeiro 2007				
(Mexico) Guadalajara 2011	Bronze medal	3rd place, bronze medalist(s)	2	2
(Canada) Toronto 2015	Bronze medal	3rd place, bronze medalist(s)	3	1
(Peru) Lima 2019	Gold medal	1st place, gold medalist(s)	5	0
(Chile) Santiago 2023	Quarterfinals	5th	2	1
Total	1 Title	8/8		

== See also ==
- U.S. Squash
- World Team Squash Championships
- United States women's national squash team
