= Robin Gadola =

Swiss squash player (born 1994)

Personal information
- Nationality: Swiss
- Born: 7 October 1994 (age 31) Uster, Switzerland

Sport
- Turned pro: 2013
- Retired: Active
- Racquet used: Harrow

Men's singles
- Highest ranking: No. 105 (December 2021)
- Current ranking: No. 139 (September 2022)
Medal record
Men's squash
Representing Switzerland
World Team Championships
Bronze medal – third place	2023 Tauranga	Team
Bronze medal – third place	2024 Hong Kong	Team
European Team Championships
Bronze medal – third place	2023 Helsinki	Team
Bronze medal – third place	2024 Uster	Team
Silver medal – second place	2026 Amsterdam	Team

Robin Gadola (born 7 October 1994) is a Swiss professional squash player. He reached a career high ranking of 105 in the world during December 2021.

== Career ==
Gadola won the 2022 Eastside Open.

In December 2023, Gadola won a bronze medal with Switzerland, at the 2023 Men's World Team Squash Championships in New Zealand. He won another bronze medal with Switzerland, at the December 2024 Men's World Team Squash Championships in Hong Kong.

In May 2026 he won a silver medal at the 2026 European Team Championships in Amsterdam.
