= Lowri Roberts =

Welsh squash player (born 1997)

Personal information
- Nationality: British (Welsh)
- Born: 18 October 1997 (age 28) Bodelwyddan, Wales

Sport
- Turned pro: 2015
- Retired: Active

Women's singles
- Highest ranking: No. 84 (March 2025)
- Current ranking: No. 87 (May 2024)
- Title: 2
Medal record
Squash
Representing Wales
European Team Championships
Bronze medal – third place	2017 Helsinki	Team
Silver medal – second place	2022 Eindhoven	Team
Bronze medal – third place	2023 Helsinki	Team
Bronze medal – third place	2024 Uster	Team
Welsh National Championships
Gold medal – first place	2023	singles

Lowri Roberts (born 18 October 1997) is a Welsh professional squash player. As of May 2024, she was ranked number 87 in the world. She reached a career high ranking of 84 in the world during March 2025.

== Biography ==
In 2023, Roberts became the Welsh champion after winning the title at the Welsh National Squash Championships.

In February 2026, Roberts won her second PSA title after securing victory in the St James Open during the 2025–26 PSA Squash Tour.
