= United States national squash team =

United States national squash team may refer to:

- United States men's national squash team
- United States women's national squash team
