= Georgina Kennedy =

English squash player (born 1997)

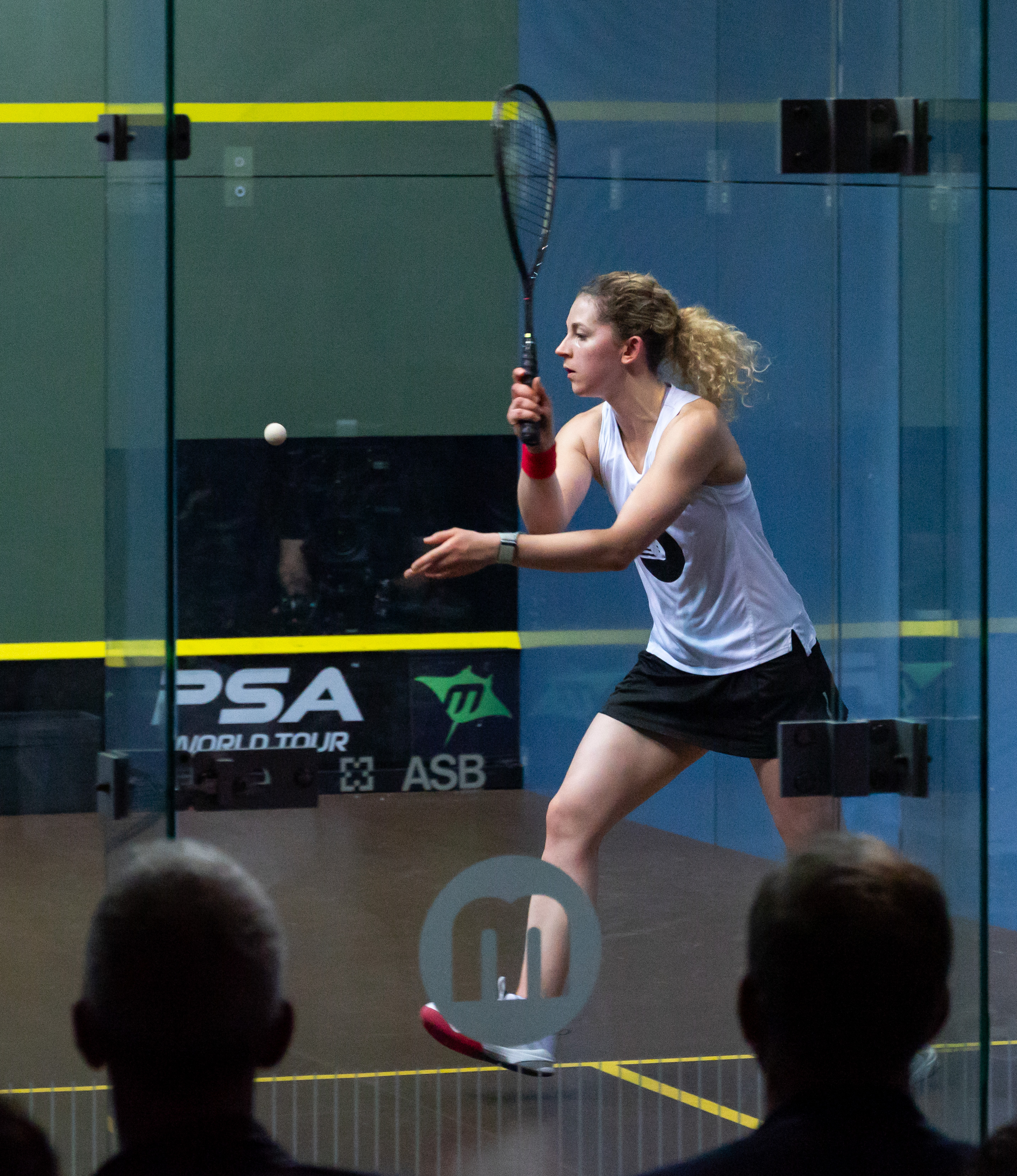
- Georgina Kennedy in 2024

Personal information
- Born: 3 April 1997 (age 29) London, England

Sport
- Handedness: Right Handed
- Coached by: Rodney Martin
- Retired: Active
- Racquet used: Head

Women's singles
- Highest ranking: No. 5 (May 2024)
- Current ranking: No. 8 (18 May 2026)
Medal record
Women's squash
Representing England
Commonwealth Games
Gold medal – first place	2022 Birmingham	Singles
European Team Championships
Gold medal – first place	2022 Eindhoven	Team
Gold medal – first place	2023 Helsinki	Team
Silver medal – second place	2024 Uster	Team
Gold medal – first place	2025 Wrocław	Team
Gold medal – first place	2026 Amsterdam	Team

Georgina Kennedy (born 3 April 1997) is an English professional squash player. Kennedy became the first Englishwoman to win a Commonwealth Games squash singles title. She reached a career high ranking of number 5 in the world during May 2024.

== Early life ==
Raised in Beckenham in southeast London, Kennedy attended Langley Park School for Girls and was a promising runner, ranked number one in England for the 1500 metres at U12 level, and training with sprint star Dina Asher-Smith at Blackheath and Bromley Harriers. However, having first played squash at the age of nine, she later, aged 13, decided to focus on squash, playing for the Parklangley club.

== Career ==
In 2015, Kennedy reached the quarter-finals of the 2015 Women's World Junior Squash Championships, and won the European under-19 squash championships in Prague.

Until 2020, Kennedy divided her time between squash and studying at Harvard University where she co-captained the university's Howe Cup-winning women’s team, and won the US National Collegiate Individual Championship (Ramsay Cup) three times, in 2017, 2019 and 2020. In February 2020, she was awarded the 2020 College Squash Association's Betty Richey Award, one of the biggest honours in US college squash.

Following a suspension of competitive squash tournaments during 2020 due to the COVID-19 pandemic, Kennedy began a run of 50 out of 55 tour wins, 11 finals and nine titles in one year. In February 2021, ranked 167 in the world, she reached the final of the English Squash Championships, losing to World No.6 Sarah-Jane Perry. In September 2021, she won the Scottish Open. Then, ranked 51 in the world, Kennedy reached her first PSA World Tour final in October 2021, losing 3-0 to World No.2 Nouran Gohar in the DAC Pro Squash Classic in Detroit.

In June 2022, Kennedy was nominated for the PSA World Tour Women's Player of the Season, having risen from World No.170 to break into the top ten in April 2022, won her first PSA World Tour title in the Bronze-level Cleveland Classic and reached the last 16 of four Platinum tournaments and the World Squash Championships. Her rapid rise to prominence earned comparisons with fellow Parklangley member, tennis player Emma Raducanu. In August 2022, Kennedy was ranked number 8 in the world,

On 3 August 2022, Kennedy won gold in the 2022 Commonwealth Games in Birmingham, beating England team-mate (and eventual bronze medallist) Perry in a semi-final and then beating Canada's Hollie Naughton in the final to become the first Englishwoman to win a Commonwealth squash singles title. Paired with Patrick Rooney and Lucy Turmel respectively, Kennedy also competed in the mixed doubles and women's doubles events.

In May 2023, she reached the quarter final of the 2023 PSA Women's World Squash Championship, before losing to number 2 seed Nour El Sherbini. Also in 2023, Kennedy was part of the England squad that won the European Squash Team Championships in Helsinki.

In May 2024, Kennedy achieved her highest world rankings to date: No. 5. In August 2024 Kennedy claimed her first British National Squash Championships. In May 2025, Kennedy was part of the England team that won the gold medal at the 2025 European Squash Team Championships in Wrocław, Poland and the 2026 European Team Championships in Amsterdam.
