= Yannick Wilhelmi =

Swiss squash player (born 2000)

Personal information
- Born: 12 October 2000 (age 25) Grabs, Switzerland

Sport
- Turned pro: 2019
- Retired: Active
- Racquet used: Unsquashable

Men's singles
- Highest ranking: No. 36 (November 2025)
- Current ranking: No. 36 (November 2025)
- Title: 7
Medal record
Men's squash
Representing Switzerland
World Team Championships
Bronze medal – third place	2023 Tauranga	Team
Bronze medal – third place	2024 Hong Kong	Team
European Team Championships
Bronze medal – third place	2023 Helsinki	Team
Bronze medal – third place	2024 Uster	Team
Bronze medal – third place	2025 Wrocław	Team
Silver medal – second place	2026 Amsterdam	Team

Yannick Wilhelmi (born 12 October 2000) is a Swiss professional squash player. He reached a career high ranking of 36 in the world during November 2025.

== Career ==
In December 2023, Wilhelmi won a bronze medal with Switzerland, at the 2023 Men's World Team Squash Championships in New Zealand.

After a first round exit from the 2024 PSA Men's World Squash Championship in May, he won his 6th PSA title after securing victory in the PSA des Hauts-de-France during the 2024–25 PSA Squash Tour.

Wilhelmi won another bronze medal with Switzerland, at the December 2024 Men's World Team Squash Championships in Hong Kong.

In October 2025, he won his/her 7th PSA title after securing victory in the Czech Open during the 2025–26 PSA Squash Tour.

In May 2026 he won a silver medal at the 2026 European Team Championships in Amsterdam.
