= Switzerland men's national squash team =

Switzerland
- Coach: Pascal Bruhin
- Association: Swiss Squash
- Colors: Red

World Team Championships
- First year: 1987
- Titles: 0
- Runners-up: 0
- Best finish: 3rd

European Team Championships
- Titles: 0
- Runners-up: 1
- Best finish: 2nd

The Switzerland men's national squash team represents Switzerland in international squash team competitions, and is governed by Swiss Squash.

Switzerland won a bronze medal at the World Team Squash Championships in 2023 and 2024.

== Current team ==
- Nicolas Müller
- Dimitri Steinmann
- Yannick Wilhelmi
- David Bernet
- Louai Hafez
- Robin Gadola

== Results ==
=== World Team Squash Championships ===
Year	Result	Position	W	L
(England) London 1987	Group Stage	18th	3	5
Singapore 1989	Group Stage	18th	3	5
(Finland) Helsinki 1991	Group Stage	20th	0	6
(Pakistan) Karachi 1993	Group Stage	23rd	1	3
(Egypt) Cairo 1995	Group Stage	26th	2	4
(Malaysia) Petaling Jaya 1997	Group Stage	17th	5	1
(Egypt) Cairo 1999	Group Stage	17th	4	2
(Australia) Melbourne 2001	Did not present			
(Austria) Vienna 2003	Round of 16	13th	4	3
(Pakistan) Islamabad 2005	Did not present			
(India) Chennai 2007	Did not present			
(Denmark) Odense 2009	Did not present			
(Germany) Paderborn 2011	Group Stage	16th	5	2
(France) Mulhouse 2013	Group Stage	17th	4	2
(Egypt) Cairo 2015	Cancelled			
(France) Marseille 2017	Round of 16	16th	1	5
(United States) Washington, D.C. 2019	Round of 16	12th	1	4
(New Zealand) Tauranga 2023	Semi Final	3rd	4	1
Hong Kong 2024	Semi Final	3rd	4	1
Total	14/28	0 Title	41	44

=== European Squash Team Championships ===
Year	Result	Position
(Scotland) Edinburgh 1973	Not in the Top 4	
(Sweden) Stockholm 1974	Not in the Top 4	
(Republic of Ireland) Dublin 1975	Not in the Top 4	
(Belgium) Brussels 1976	Not in the Top 4	
(England) Sheffield 1977	Not in the Top 4	
(Netherlands) Amsterdam 1978	Not in the Top 4	
(Germany) Hamburg 1979	Not in the Top 4	
(Finland) Helsinki 1980	Not in the Top 4	
(Netherlands) Amsterdam 1981	Not in the Top 4	
(Wales) Cardiff 1982	Not in the Top 4	
(Germany) Munich 1983	Not in the Top 4	
(Republic of Ireland) Dublin 1984	Not in the Top 4	
(Spain) Barcelona 1985	Not in the Top 4	
(France) Aix-en-Provence 1986	Not in the Top 4	
(Austria) Vienna 1987	Not in the Top 4	
(Netherlands) Warmond 1988	Not in the Top 4	
(Finland) Helsinki 1989	Not in the Top 4	
(Switzerland) Zürich 1990	Not in the Top 4	
(Germany) Gelsenkirchen 1991	Not in the Top 4	
(France) Aix-en-Provence 1992	Not in the Top 4	
(France) Aix-en-Provence 1993	Not in the Top 4	
(Germany) Zoetermeer 1994	Not in the Top 4	
(Netherlands) Amsterdam 1995	Not in the Top 4	
(Netherlands) Amsterdam 1996	Not in the Top 4	
(Denmark) Odense 1997	Not in the Top 4	
(Finland) Helsinki 1998	Not in the Top 4	
(Austria) Linz 1999	Not in the Top 4	
(Austria) Vienna 2000	Not in the Top 4	
(Netherlands) Eindhoven 2001	Not in the Top 4	
(Germany) Böblingen 2002	Not in the Top 4	
(England) Nottingham 2003	Not in the Top 4	
(France) Rennes 2004	Not in the Top 4	
(Netherlands) Amsterdam 2005	Not in the Top 4	
(Austria) Vienna 2006	Not in the Top 4	
(Italy) Riccione 2007	Not in the Top 4	
(Netherlands) Amsterdam 2008	Not in the Top 4	
(Sweden) Malmö 2009	Not in the Top 4	
(France) Aix-en-Provence 2010	Not in the Top 4	
(Finland) Espoo 2011	Not in the Top 4	
(Germany) Nuremberg 2012	Not in the Top 4	
(Netherlands) Amsterdam 2013	Not in the Top 4	
(Italy) Riccione 2014	Not in the Top 4	
(Denmark) Herning 2015	Not in the Top 4	
(Poland) Warsaw 2016	Not in the Top 4	
(Finland) Helsinki 2017	Not in the Top 4	
(Poland) Wrocław 2018	Not in the Top 4	
(England) Birmingham 2019	Not in the Top 4	
(Netherlands) Eindhoven 2022	Not in the Top 4	
(Finland) Helsinki 2023	Semi Final	3rd
(Switzerland) Uster 2024	Semi Final	3rd
(Poland) Wrocław 2025	Semi Final	3rd
(Netherlands) Amsterdam 2026	Final	2nd
Total	x0 - x0 - x3	

== See also ==
- Swiss Squash
- World Team Squash Championships
