= Jasmine Hutton =

English squash player

Personal information
- Born: 5 April 1999 (age 27) Brighton, England

Sport
- Country: England
- Handedness: Left Handed
- Turned pro: 2017
- Racquet used: Tecnifibre

Women's singles
- Highest ranking: No. 13 (April 2026)
- Current ranking: No. 13 (20 April 2026)
- Title: 10
Medal record
Representing England
World Team Championships
| Bronze medal – third place | 2022 Cairo | Team |
European Team Championships
| Gold medal – first place | 2022 Eindhoven | Team |
| Gold medal – first place | 2023 Helsinki | Team |
| Silver medal – second place | 2024 Uster | Team |
| Gold medal – first place | 2025 Wrocław | Team |
| Gold medal – first place | 2026 Amsterdam | Team |

Jasmine Hutton (born 5 April 1999) is an English professional squash player. She reached a career high ranking of number 13 in the world during April 2026.

== Biography ==
In 2022, Hutton won the women's singles at the British National Squash Championships. Later that year, she won a bronze at the 2022 Women's World Team Squash Championships.

In 2022 and 2023, Hutton was part of the England team that won the European Squash Team Championships in Eindhoven and Helsinki respectively.

In March 2025, Hutton won her 9th PSA title after securing victory in the Calgary Open during the 2024–25 PSA Squash Tour. In May 2025, Hutton won her third European team gold medal at the 2025 European Squash Team Championships in Wrocław, Poland.

In May 2026 she won the 2026 European Team Championships in Amsterdam with England.
