= Belgium women's national squash team =

Belgium
- Coach: Ronny Vlassaks
- Association: European Squash Federation

World Team Championships
- First year: 1998
- Best finish: 3rd

The Belgium women's national squash team represents Belgium in international squash team competitions, and is governed by the European Squash Federation.

Since 1998, Belgium has competed in the World Team Squash Championships and earned a bronze medal during their third appearance at the 2024 Women's World Team Squash Championships. The team's greatest achievement to date came when winning the gold medal at the 2024 European Squash Team Championships.

== Results ==
=== World Team Squash Championships ===
Year	Result	Team	Ref
1998	first round	Annabel Romadenne, Kim Hannes, Katline Cauwels	
2004	first round	Katline Cauwels, Annabel Romedenne, Charlie de Rycke, Kim Hannes-Teunen	
2024	Bronze medal	Tinne Gilis, Nele Coll, Chloé Crabbé	

=== European Team Squash Championships ===
Year	Result	Team	Ref
2004	4th		
2018	Bronze medal	Nele Gilis, Tinne Gilis, Lreline Pira	
2019	Bronze medal	Nele Gilis, Tinne Gilis, Yara Delagrance	
2022	6th	Tinne Gilis, Marie-Amelie Callebaut, Chloé Crabbé	
2023	Silver medal	Tinne Gilis, Nele Gilis, Chloé Crabbé	
2024	Gold medal	Tinne Gilis, Nele Gilis, Marie Van Riet	
2025	Silver medal	Tinne Gilis, Nele Coll, Chloé Crabbé	

== See also ==
- World Team Squash Championships
- European Squash Team Championships
