= Baptiste Masotti =

French squash player (born 1995)

Personal information
- Born: 5 June 1995 (age 31) Niort, France
- Height: 183 cm (6 ft 0 in)
- Weight: 78 kg (172 lb)

Sport
- Country: France
- Turned pro: 2019
- Retired: Active
- Highest ranking: No. 13 (January 2024)
- Current ranking: No. 17 (14 July 2025)
- Title: 6
- Tour final: 16
Medal record
Men's squash
Representing France
World Team Championships
Bronze medal – third place	2019 Washington D.C.	Team
Bronze medal – third place	2023 Tauranga	Team
Bronze medal – third place	2024 Hong Kong	Team
European Team Championships
Silver medal – second place	2022 Eindhoven	Team
Silver medal – second place	2023 Helsinki	Team
Silver medal – second place	2024 Uster	Team
Silver medal – second place	2025 Wrocław	Team
Bronze medal – third place	2026 Amsterdam	Team

Baptiste Masotti (born 5 June 1995) is a French professional squash player. As of December 2024, he was ranked number 23 in the world; his highest career rank was 13, on 29 January 2024.

== Career ==
=== Junior career ===
Masotti's father, Jean-Michel Masotti, was also a nationally ranked squash player. Baptiste Masotti took up the sport when he was 11. In his early teens, he also played football in Niort as well as squash. In 2009, after winning bronze in the under-15s division of the French Squash Championships, he chose to focus on squash and was selected for the French national under-15s team at the European Championships in May 2009. He attended a boarding school while training at the Squash Academy in La Rochelle, then when he was 16, moved to Aix-en-Provence. He won the national championship in 2010 as an under-15 and 2011 as an under-17.

=== Senior career ===
In 2019, Masotti for the first time played for the French senior team at the WSF World Team Championships.

=== Professional career ===
Masotti debuted in the Professional Squash Association in the 2019–20 season while studying commerce and marketing. In October 2019 he played in his first platinum-level tournament, the Egyptian Squash Open, where he defeated the former European champion Borja Golán, the former world 4th-ranked Miguel Ángel Rodríguez and the former world junior champion Ng Eain Yow to reach the quarter-finals. At the 2020 Tournament of Champions, he defeated the former top-ranked England player Adrian Waller in the first round. In December 2019, he was ranked in the top 50 for the first time, and in February 2020, in the top 40; when rankings were frozen because of the COVID-19 pandemic, he was ranked number 37.

In the 2020–21 World Championship, he reached the third round, where he was knocked out by former world champion Karim Abdel Gawad. In November 2021 he broke into the top 20.

Masotti reached the quarter-finals at the 2022 World Games, losing to Miguel Ángel Rodríguez. In 2023 he reached the quarter-finals of the Canary Wharf Classic, losing to Mostafa Asal, ranked number 1 at the time.

In the 2023–24 season, he beat Asal to reach the semi-finals of the 2023 Grasshopper Cup, then won the Lagord 30k in October 2023. In December 2023, Masotti won a bronze medal with France, at the 2023 Men's World Team Squash Championships in New Zealand.

After reaching the last 16 in the 2024 Tournament of Champions, he reached his highest career rank of number 13 on 29 January 2024.

After a surprise first round exit from the 2024 PSA Men's World Squash Championship in May, he won another bronze medal with France, at the 2024 Men's World Team Squash Championships in Hong Kong.

In May 2026 he won a bronze medal at the 2026 European Team Championships in Amsterdam.
