= Victor Crouin =

French squash player (born 1999)

Personal information
- Nickname: Totor
- Born: 16 June 1999 (age 27) Marseille, France
- Education: Harvard University
- Height: 1.7 m (5 ft 7 in)
- Weight: 65 kg (143 lb)
- Website: https://www.victorcrouin.com

Sport
- Country: French
- Handedness: Right-handed
- Coached by: Emmanuel Crouin, Mathieu Castagnet
- Retired: Active
- Racquet used: Dunlop

Men's singles
- Highest ranking: No. 6 (November 2025)
- Current ranking: No. 7 (February 2026)
- Title: 23
Medal record
Men's squash
Representing France
World Team Championships
Bronze medal – third place	2023 Tauranga	Team
Bronze medal – third place	2024 Hong Kong	Team
The World Games
Gold medal – first place	2022 Birmingham	Singles
Gold medal – first place	2025 Chengdu	Singles
European Team Championships
Silver medal – second place	2023 Helsinki	Team
Silver medal – second place	2024 Uster	Team
Silver medal – second place	2025 Wrocław	Team
Bronze medal – third place	2026 Amsterdam	Team

Victor Crouin (born 16 June 1999) is a French professional squash player. He is in a career high world ranking of number 5 in October 2026, having won the Open de France de Squash 2022.

== Biography ==
Crouin graduated from Harvard University in 2022 having played for the Harvard Crimson men's squash team.

In December 2023, Crouin won a bronze medal with France, at the 2023 Men's World Team Squash Championships in New Zealand.

After reaching the third round of the 2024 PSA Men's World Squash Championship in May, where he lost to Tarek Momen he won another bronze medal with France, at the December 2024 Men's World Team Squash Championships in Hong Kong.

In March 2025, Crouin won his 20th PSA title after securing victory in the German Open during the 2024–25 PSA Squash Tour. He followed this up by winning a 21st title in October, winning the New York Open Squash Classic during the 2025–26 PSA Squash Tour. During the same season he won a 22nd and 23rd tour title after winning the Texas Open and Canadian Open respectively.

== Titles and Finals ==
=== Major Finals (0 wins, 1 loss) ===
Major tournaments include:

- PSA World Championships
- PSA World Tour Finals
- Top-tier PSA World Tour tournaments (Platinum/World Series/Super Series)

Year/Season	Tournament	Opponent	Result	Score
2022	Qatar Classic	Mohamed El Shorbagy	Loss (1)	4-11 6-11 11-7 8-11
