= Tom Walsh (squash player) =

English squash player (born 1999)

Personal information
- Nationality: British (English)
- Born: 27 April 1999 (age 27) Hemel Hempstead, England

Sport
- Racquet used: Technifibre

men's singles
- Highest ranking: 63 (December 2024)
- Current ranking: 72 (May 2026)
- Title: 4
Medal record
Men's squash
Representing England
European Team Championships
| Gold medal – first place | 2024 Uster | Team |
| Gold medal – first place | 2025 Wrocław | Team |

Tom Walsh (born 27 April 1999) is an English male professional squash player. He reached a career high ranking of number 53 in the world during December 2024.

== Career ==
Walsh achieved his highest career ranking of 66 (at the time) in December 2023 during the 2023–24 PSA World Tour.

In May 2024, Walsh helped England team retain the European Squash Team Championships at the 2024 European Team Championships in Switzerland. In May 2025, Walsh was part of the England team that won the gold medal at the 2025 European Squash Team Championships in Wrocław, Poland.

In April 2026, he won his fourt PSA title after securing victory in the Hyder Trophy during the 2025–26 PSA Squash Tour.
