= Swiss Squash =

Schweizerischer Squash Verband
- Sport: Squash
- Founded: 1974
- Regional affiliation: European Squash Federation
- Location: Switzerland
- President: Ernst Roth

Official website
- www.squash.ch
- (Switzerland)

Swiss Squash ("Swiss Squash Association") represents the sport squash in Switzerland and organizes nationwide tournaments such as Interclub championship and national singles championships. The association was founded in 1973 and promotes squash in Switzerland.

Swiss Squash represents for "Jugend + Sport" the squash section.

Since 2018, the association has been working with the Swiss Squash Community to offer new solutions in the digital world. The platform Swiss Squash Community serves as a contact point for knowledge, player search, tournaments and squash halls search.

== See also ==
- Switzerland men's national squash team
