= Adrian Waller =

English squash player (born 1989)

Personal information
- Born: 26 December 1989 (age 36) Enfield, London, England
- Height: 1.90 m (6 ft 3 in)
- Weight: 80 kg (176 lb)

Sport
- Turned pro: 2008
- Coached by: Paul Carter
- Retired: Active
- Racquet used: Prince

Men's singles
- Highest ranking: No. 17 (November 2019)
- Current ranking: No. 56 (June 2025)
- Title: 8
Medal record
Men's squash
Representing England
World Team Championships
Silver medal – second place	2017 Marseille	Team
Silver medal – second place	2019 Washington D.C.	Team
Silver medal – second place	2023 Tauranga	Team
World Doubles Championships
Silver medal – second place	2022 Glasgow	Mixed doubles
Commonwealth Games
Silver medal – second place	2018 Gold Coast	Doubles
European Team Championships
Silver medal – second place	2015 Herning	Team
Gold medal – first place	2016 Warsaw	Team
Gold medal – first place	2019 Birmingham	Team
Gold medal – first place	2022 Eindhoven	Team
Gold medal – first place	2023 Helsinki	Team

Adrian Waller (born 26 December 1989) is a professional squash player who represents England. He reached a career high ranking of 17 in the world during November 2019.

== Career ==
Waller won British Junior National titles at various age categories before joining the PSA Tour.

At the 2016 European Squash Team Championships in Warsaw, Waller won his first European Squash Team Championships and at the 2017 Men's World Team Squash Championships, he was part of the England team that won the silver medal at the World Team Championships in Marseille and repeated the success two years later at the 2019 Championships. In 2018, he won a silver medal at the 2018 Commonwealth Games in the men's doubles with Daryl Selby. During the 2019-20 season he won the Life Time Chicago Open.

In November 2019, he hit a career best world ranking (at the time) of 17 and won a second European Team gold in Birmingham. In 2021, he finished runner up to Joel Makin at the British National Squash Championships.

In 2022, he won two more Commonwealth Games silver medals, at the 2022 Commonwealth Games. Also in 2022, he won his 10th tour title after winning the Jansher Khan Canberra Open.

He was a member of the England team that won the European Team tite in 2022 and 2023. In December 2023, Waller won a silver medal with England, at the 2023 Men's World Team Squash Championships in New Zealand.
