= Sébastien Bonmalais =

French squash player (born 1998)

Personal information
- Nickname: Seb
- Born: 6 February 1998 (age 28) Saint-Pierre, Reunion Island
- Height: 1.78 m (5 ft 10 in)
- Weight: 63 kg (139 lb)

Sport
- Country: France
- Handedness: Right-handed
- Coached by: Fred Lecomte, JP Bonmalais
- Retired: Active
- Racquet used: Tecnifibre

Men's singles
- Highest ranking: 21 (November 2024)
- Current ranking: No. 24 (14 July 2025)
- Title: 2
- Tour final: 2
Medal record
Men's squash
Representing France
World Team Championships
| Bronze medal – third place | 2024 Hong Kong | Team |
European Team Championships
| Silver medal – second place | 2022 Eindhoven | Team |
| Silver medal – second place | 2024 Uster | Team |

Sébastien Bonmalais (born 6 February 1998) is a French professional squash player. He reached a career high ranking of 21 in the world in November 2024.

== Career ==
Bonmalais won the 2017 Gibraltar Open and the 2017 Guatemala Open.

After a first round exit to Aly Abou Eleinen at the 2024 PSA Men's World Squash Championship in May. In Late October 2024, he won his 7th PSA title after securing victory in the Czech Open during the 2024–25 PSA Squash Tour.

He won a bronze medal with France, at the December 2024 Men's World Team Squash Championships in Hong Kong.
