= Onaopemipo Adegoke =

Nigerian squash player

Personal information
- Nickname: Smiling Assassin
- Born: September 25, 1999 (age 27) Lagos, Nigeria
- Height: 188 cm (6 ft 2 in)
- Weight: 80 kg (176 lb)

Sport
- Country: Nigeria
- Handedness: Right-handed
- Turned pro: 2018
- Coached by: Self-coached
- Racquet used: Shahtoosh

Men's singles
- Highest ranking: No. 130 (27 January 2025)
- Current ranking: No. 135
- Title: 3
- Tour final: 3
- Updated on 18 November 2024

Onaopemipo Adegoke (born 25 September 1999 in Lagos) is a Nigerian professional squash player. He won three titles on the PSA World Tour, becoming Nigeria's first squash player to win two PSA Challenger titles.

== Career ==
Adegoke joined PSA in 2018.

In September 2023, Adegoke won his first PSA title at the Namibian Open in Windhoek.

In November 2024, Adegoke won the Squash Inspire Men’s Pro Challenger tournament in Columbia, United States.

At the 2023 Lagos Squash Classic, Adegoke, defeated Brice Nicolas in the opening round and upset sixth seed Ziad Ibrahim in the second round.

Adegoke represented Nigeria at the 2022 Men's All Africa Team Championship in Bulawayo, where the team placed third. He also competed in the 2023 and 2024 World Team Championships, winning two of four matches in 2023 and three of six in 2024.

In 2025, Adegoke carried Nigeria’s flag solo at the World Games in Chengdu, China, reaching the plate final.
