= Owain Taylor =

Welsh squash player (born 1996)

Personal information
- Born: 18 January 1996 (age 30) Colchester, England

Sport
- Country: Wales
- Handedness: Right-handed
- Turned pro: 2015
- Retired: Active
- Racquet used: Unsquashable

Men's singles
- Highest ranking: No. 112 (January 2023)
- Current ranking: No. 112 (January 2023)
- Updated on January 2023

Owain Taylor (born 18 January 1996 in Colchester) is a Welsh professional squash player. As of January 2023, he was ranked number 112 in the world. He represents Wales. He won the 2023 Kent Open.
