= Nicolas Müller (squash player) =

Swiss squash player (born 1989)

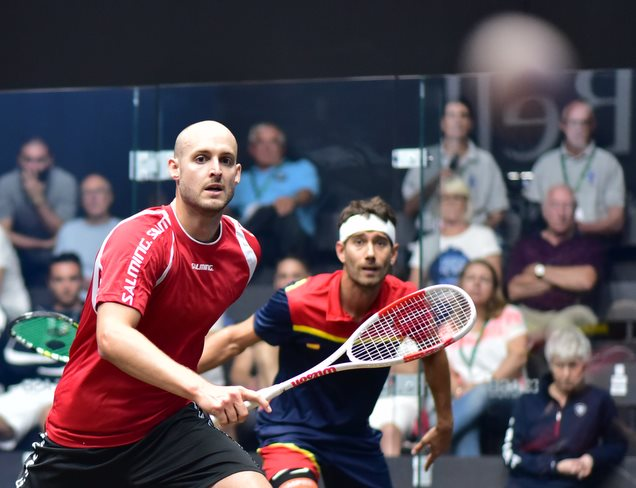

Personal information
- Born: 24 August 1989 (age 36) Winterthur, Zurich
- Height: 1.88 m (6 ft 2 in)
- Weight: 82 kg (181 lb)

Sport
- Country: Switzerland
- Turned pro: 2005
- Coached by: Marcel Straub
- Retired: Active
- Racquet used: Wilson

Men's singles
- Highest ranking: No. 13 (November 2022)
- Current ranking: No. 30 (December 2025)
- Title: 13
Medal record
Men's squash
Representing Switzerland
World Team Championships
| Bronze medal – third place | 2023 Tauranga | Team |
| Bronze medal – third place | 2024 Hong Kong | Team |
European Team Championships
| Bronze medal – third place | 2023 Helsinki | Team |
| Bronze medal – third place | 2024 Uster | Team |
| Bronze medal – third place | 2025 Wrocław | Team |
| Silver medal – second place | 2026 Amsterdam | Team |

Nicolas Müller (born 24 August 1989) is a professional squash player who represents Switzerland. He reached a career high ranking of 13 in the world during November 2022. and was the first Swiss player to enter the world's top 20.

== Career ==
In December 2023, Müller won a bronze medal with Switzerland, at the 2023 Men's World Team Squash Championships in New Zealand.

After a second round exit to Mostafa Asal at the 2024 PSA Men's World Squash Championship in May, he won another bronze medal with Switzerland, at the December 2024 Men's World Team Squash Championships in Hong Kong.

In November 2025, he won his 13th PSA title after securing victory in the White Oaks Cup during the 2025–26 PSA Squash Tour.

In May 2026 he won a silver medal at the 2026 European Team Championships in Amsterdam.

Sporting positions
| Preceded by Mohamed El Shorbagy | PSA Young Player of the Year; 2011 | Succeeded by Marwan El Shorbagy |
