= Patrick Rooney (squash player) =

English squash player (born 1997)

Personal information
- Born: 16 June 1997 (age 29) St. Helens, Merseyside, England
- Height: 184 cm (6 ft 0 in)
- Weight: 85 kg (187 lb)

Sport
- Coached by: James Willstrop
- Retired: Active
- Racquet used: 305Squash ProCell XR120
- Highest ranking: No. 18 (January 2023)
- Current ranking: No. 50 (December 2025)
- Title: 6
Medal record
Men's squash
Representing England
World Team Championships
Silver medal – second place	2023 Tauranga	Team
European Team Championships
Gold medal – first place	2022 Eindhoven	Team
Gold medal – first place	2023 Helsinki	Team
Gold medal – first place	2026 Amsterdam	Team

Patrick Rooney (born 16 June 1997) is an English professional squash player. He reached a career high ranking of 18 in the world during January 2023.

== Career ==
Rooney first joined the PSA Tour in 2014 and won his first title in 2016, when he won the Madeira International.

By 2017 he had reached the world's top 100 players and then won the Vitesse Stratford Classic, Madeira International (for a second time) and the Arnold Homes Tring Open. He would later reach the last 16 of both the Gillen Markets Canary Wharf Classic and the Allam British Open.

Rooney represented the England team in the 2022 Commonwealth Games in Birmingham, and reached the last 16 of the singles and mixed doubles events.

In 2022, he was a member of the England team that won the 2022 European Squash Team Championships. In January 2023, he hit a career best world ranking (at the time) of 18 and was a member of the England team that won the 2023 European Squash Team Championships.

In November 2023, Rooney won his 5th PSA title after securing victory in the Czech Open during the 2023–24 PSA World Tour and one month later in December 2023, Rooney won a silver medal with England, at the 2023 Men's World Team Squash Championships in New Zealand. Rooney won a sixth PSA title during the 2025–26 PSA Squash Tour, winning the Madeira International in December 2025.

In May 2026 he won a third European Team Championships in Amsterdam.
