= Spencer Lovejoy =

American professional squash player (born 1998)

Personal information
- Born: May 14, 1998 (age 28) Connecticut, USA
- Education: Yale University
- Height: 5 ft 9 in (175 cm)

Sport
- Country: United States
- Turned pro: 2016
- Coached by: Lynn Leong, Nick Taylor
- Retired: Active
- Racquet used: Dunlop

Men's singles
- Highest ranking: No. 64 (November 2023)
- Current ranking: No. 67 (June 2024)
- Updated on June 2021

Spencer Lovejoy (born 14 May 1998 in Connecticut) is an American professional squash player.

As of October 2021, he was ranked number 69 in the world. He has competed in multiple PSA professional tournaments and earned his first PSA title at the Mississauga Open in 2019.

Lovejoy graduated from Hopkins School in New Haven in 2016, and proceeded to play for the Yale Bulldogs men's squash team playing in the #1 seat all 4 years of his college career. He was a four-time First-Team All-American, winner of the Skillman Award for Sportsmanship in 2020, and named team captain his senior year.
