= Tinne Gilis =

Belgian squash player (born 1997)

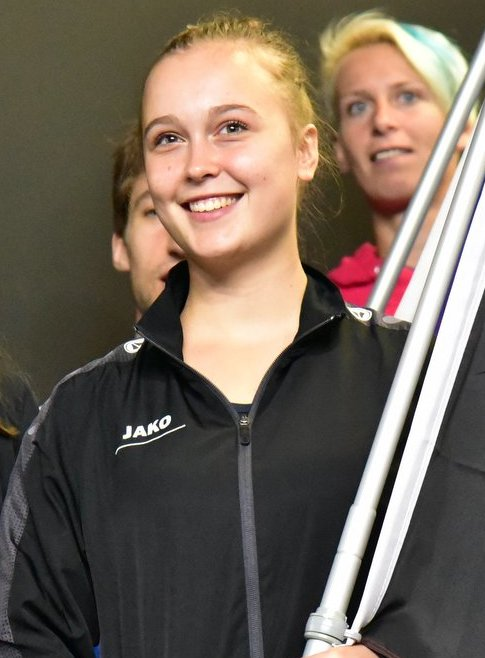

Personal information
- Nationality: Belgian
- Born: October 29, 1997 (age 28) Mol, Belgium

Sport
- Coached by: Ronny Vlassaks
- Retired: Active
- Racquet used: Eye

Women's singles
- Highest ranking: No. 5 (November 2024)
- Current ranking: No. 9 (18 May 2026)
- Title: 8
Medal record
Women's squash
Representing Belgium
World Games
Gold medal – first place	2022 Birmingham	Individual
World Team Championships
Bronze medal – third place	2024 Hong Kong	Team

Tinne Gilis (born 29 October 1997) is a Belgian professional squash player. She reached a career high ranking of number 5 in the world during November 2024.

== Career ==
As the 7th seed, Gilis was knocked out by top seed Nour El Sherbini in the quarter-final round at the 2024 PSA Women's World Squash Championship.

In May 2024, Gillis helped Belgium win their first ever European Squash Team Championships. Later that year in December 2024, Gillis helped Belgium win the bronze medal at the 2024 Women's World Team Squash Championships.

In March 2026, she won her 8th PSA title after securing victory in the New Zealand Open during the 2025–26 PSA Squash Tour.

== Personal life ==
Tinne's older sister, Nele Coll (née Gilis) is also a squash player and her fellow competitor on the PSA World Tour. Her younger brother Jo Gilis is a professional footballer in Belgium who has represented the Belgian national under-16 and under-17 football teams.
