= Mostafa Asal =

Egyptian squash player (born 2001)

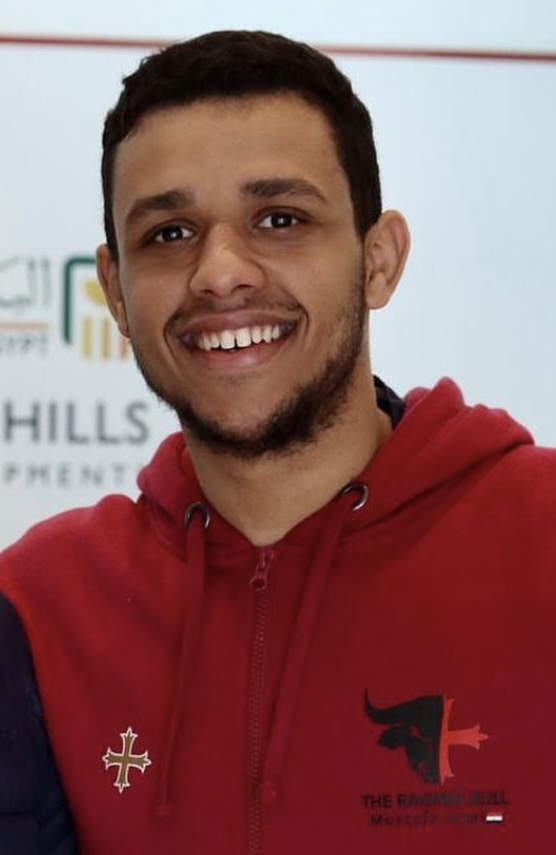
- Mostafa Asal in 2023

Personal information
- Nickname: The Raging Bull
- Born: May 9, 2001 (age 25) Cairo, Egypt
- Height: 189 cm (6 ft 2 in)
- Weight: 80 kg (176 lb)

Sport
- Country: Egypt
- Turned pro: 2018
- Coached by: Ibrahim Assal, James Willstrop
- Retired: Active
- Racquet used: Tecnifibre

Men's singles
- Highest ranking: No. 1 (January 2023)
- Current ranking: No. 1 (May 2026)
- Title: 29
- PSA Profile
Medal record
Men's squash
Representing Egypt
World Championships
| Bronze medal – third place | 2022 Cairo | singles |
| Bronze medal – third place | 2023 Chicago | singles |
| Silver medal – second place | 2024 Cairo | singles |
| Gold medal – first place | 2025 Chicago | singles |
| Gold medal – first place | 2026 Giza | singles |
World Team Championships
| Gold medal – first place | 2023 Tauranga | Team |
| Gold medal – first place | 2024 Hong Kong | Team |
British Open
| Gold medal – first place | 2024 Birmingham | Singles |
| Silver medal – second place | 2025 Birmingham | Singles |

Mostafa Asal (Arabic: مُصْطَفَى عَسَل; born 9 May 2001) is an Egyptian professional squash player. He is a two-time world individual champion and a two-time world team champion and the current top world ranked male squash player. Mostafa is nicknamed "The Raging Bull" for his aggressive style of play.

== Career ==
Mostafa Asal has won the British Junior U17 Open 2018, the PSA10 2018 Mar del Plata Open, PSA10 2018 Regatas Resistencia Open, the 2021 Men's PSA World Tour Finals, and the 2021 U.S. Open Squash Men's Championship.

In January 2021, Asal accepted a two-month suspension from the PSA following on-court disciplinary matters.

Asal reached the semi-final of the 2022 PSA Men's World Squash Championship, where he lost to the eventual champion Ali Farag.

In the 2022 U.S. Open, Asal lost a match for inflicting an injury on Lucas Serme, his opponent, by hitting him with a shot up the middle of the court, striking Serme in the head and resulting in a concussion and perforated eardrum.

In the CIB Egyptian Open in September 2022, where Asal lost to Ali Farag in the semi-finals, Asal's father, Mahmoud Asal, was suspended after the loss until November 2023 for a courtside confrontation with Husseum Abaza, CEO of CIB Bank and a major squash benefactor.

In January 2023, at the Houston Open, Asal's elbow appeared to connect with Marwan El Shorbagy's groin area, with him being taken off on a stretcher and then to the hospital, and with El Shorbagy commenting, "If this is the future of our sport then good luck." In March 2023, Asal was suspended for 6 weeks by the PSA for two separate breaches of the code of conduct relating to ‘dangerous play’. Asal also received a fine of £2,000.

However, he returned as the number 1 seed for the 2023 PSA Men's World Squash Championship and reached the semi-final where he was knocked out by Ali Farag. In August 2023 Asal received a 12-week suspension from the PSA tour for abuse of racket or equipment, physical abuse, and dangerous play during his match against Joel Makin in the 2023 world championships and unsportsmanlike conduct in the same event's match with Mazen Hesham. The suspension start date was post-dated to July 18, 2023, and Asal did not appeal the suspension. Mostafa Asal's father Mahmoud released a statement that the suspension was due to a conspiracy by Karim Darwish and an attempt to destroy the future of Asal and prevent him from reaching the top position again.

The Guardian named Asal as one of The Anti-Sports Personality of the Year awards 2023. He spent 18 weeks of the year 2023 suspended from play. His fortunes improved when in December 2023, he was part of the Egyptian team that secured the gold medal at the 2023 Men's World Team Squash Championships in New Zealand.

In May 2024, he reached the final of the 2024 PSA Men's World Squash Championship, losing in the final to Peruvian Diego Elías and in September 2024 Asal won the Paris Squash tournament, beating Ali Farag in the final. In December, Asal won a second world team title at the 2024 Men's World Team Squash Championships in Hong Kong.

In March 2025, Asal won his 19th PSA title after securing victory in the OptAsia Championships during the 2024–25 PSA Squash Tour and the following month won a 20th after victory in the El Gouna International.

Asal's biggest result of his career came when he won his first world title defeating four-time world champion Ali Farag in the 2025 Men's World Squash Championship in Chicago. Video analysis uncovered considerable cheating by Asal, and refereeing that did not hold up to expected standards. Asal did not lose a game throughout the tournament and the best that his opponents could manage was scoring an 8-point game. The last player to go through a world championship unbeaten was Jahangir Khan in 1988. Shortly afterwards in June 2025, he lost in the final of the 2025 Men's British Open Squash Championship to Diego Elías.

Asal won his 24th PSA title in October 2025 after winning the US Open during the 2025–26 PSA Squash Tour. Victories in the Hong Kong Open and Tournament of Champions quickly followed. After further winning the Windy City Open in February 2026 and the Optasia Championship in March 2026, Asal lost in the finals of the El Gouna International Open to Diego Elias in April 2026, his first loss in 23 matches.

Asal successfully defended his world individual title in May 2026 at the 2026 World championships, defeating Youssef Ibrahim in the final.

== Titles and finals ==
| Year/Season | Tournament | Opponent | Result | Score |
|---|---|---|---|---|
| 2020-21 | PSA World Tour Finals | Mohamed El Shorbagy | Win (1) | 12-14 11-4 11-7 11–3 |
| 2021 | U.S. Open | Tarek Momen | Win (2) | 5-11 5-11 11-9 12-10 11–3 |
| 2022 | El Gouna International | Paul Coll | Win (3) | 11-8 11-9 11–5 |
| 2021-22 | PSA World Tour Finals (2) | Paul Coll | Win (4) | 13-11 11-8 11–7 |
| 2022 | Hong Kong Open | Diego Elías | Win (5) | 6-11 6-11 12-10 11-9 11–4 |
| 2023 | El Gouna International | Ali Farag | Loss (1) | 10-12 12-10 6-11 2–11 |
| 2022-23 | PSA World Tour Finals (3) | Diego Elías | Win (6) | 9-11 11-6 11-3 11–5 |
