= Yannik Omlor =

German squash player (born 1996)

Personal information
- Born: 3 September 1996 (age 29) Hanau, Germany
- Height: 175 cm (5 ft 9 in)
- Weight: 73 kg (161 lb)

Sport
- Country: Germany
- Handedness: Left Handed
- Coached by: Bob Maison, Adam Fuller, Paul Carter
- Retired: Active
- Racquet used: Oliver
- Highest ranking: No. 117 (July 2019)
- Current ranking: No. 127 (January 2020)
- Updated on January 2020

Yannik Omlor (born 3 September 1996 in Hanau) is a German professional squash player. As of July 2019, he was ranked number 117 in the world and was the 3rd internationally highest ranked player in Germany.
