= Valentin Rapp =

German professional squash player (born 1992)

Personal information
- Born: September 16, 1992 (age 33) Tettnang, Germany

Sport
- Country: Germany
- Turned pro: 2017
- Retired: Active
- Racquet used: Dunlop

Men's singles
- Highest ranking: No. 127 (January 2019)
- Current ranking: No. 131 (February 2021)
- Updated on February 2021

Valentin Rapp (born 16 September 1992 in Tettnang) is a German professional squash player. As of February 2021, he was ranked number 131 in the world.
