= Dimitri Steinmann =

Swiss squash player (born 1997)

Personal information
- Nationality: Swiss
- Born: 14 July 1997 (age 29) Zürich, Switzerland

Sport
- Retired: Active
- Racquet used: Tecnifibre
- Highest ranking: No. 16 (June 2025)
- Current ranking: No. 16 (14 July 2025)
Medal record
Men's squash
Representing Switzerland
World Team Championships
Bronze medal – third place	2023 Tauranga	Team
Bronze medal – third place	2024 Hong Kong	Team
European Team Championships
Bronze medal – third place	2023 Helsinki	Team
Bronze medal – third place	2024 Uster	Team
Bronze medal – third place	2025 Wrocław	Team
Silver medal – second place	2026 Amsterdam	Team

Dimitri Steinmann (born 14 July 1997) is a Swiss professional squash player. He reached a career high ranking of 18 in the world during December 2024.

== Career ==
In December 2023, Steinmann won a bronze medal with Switzerland, at the 2023 Men's World Team Squash Championships in New Zealand.

After reaching the third round of the 2024 PSA Men's World Squash Championship in May, where he lost out to Karim Gawad, he won another bronze medal with Switzerland, at the December 2024 Men's World Team Squash Championships in Hong Kong.

In May 2026 he won a silver medal at the 2026 European Team Championships in Amsterdam.
