= Sean Conroy (squash player) =

Irish professional squash player

Personal information
- Born: 1 June 1994 (age 32) Dublin, Ireland
- Height: 180 cm (5 ft 11 in)
- Weight: 65 kg (143 lb)

Sport
- Country: Ireland
- Coached by: Hadrian Stiff, Angus Kirkland, Derek Ryan, Ian Thomas
- Retired: Active
- Racquet used: Karakal

Men's singles
- Highest ranking: No. 111 (October 2020)
- Updated on 2026

Sean Conroy (born 1 June 1994 in Dublin) is an Irish professional squash player. He won the 2018 Bendigo International Squash Open PSA 5K professional tournament.
