= Grégoire Marche =

French squash player

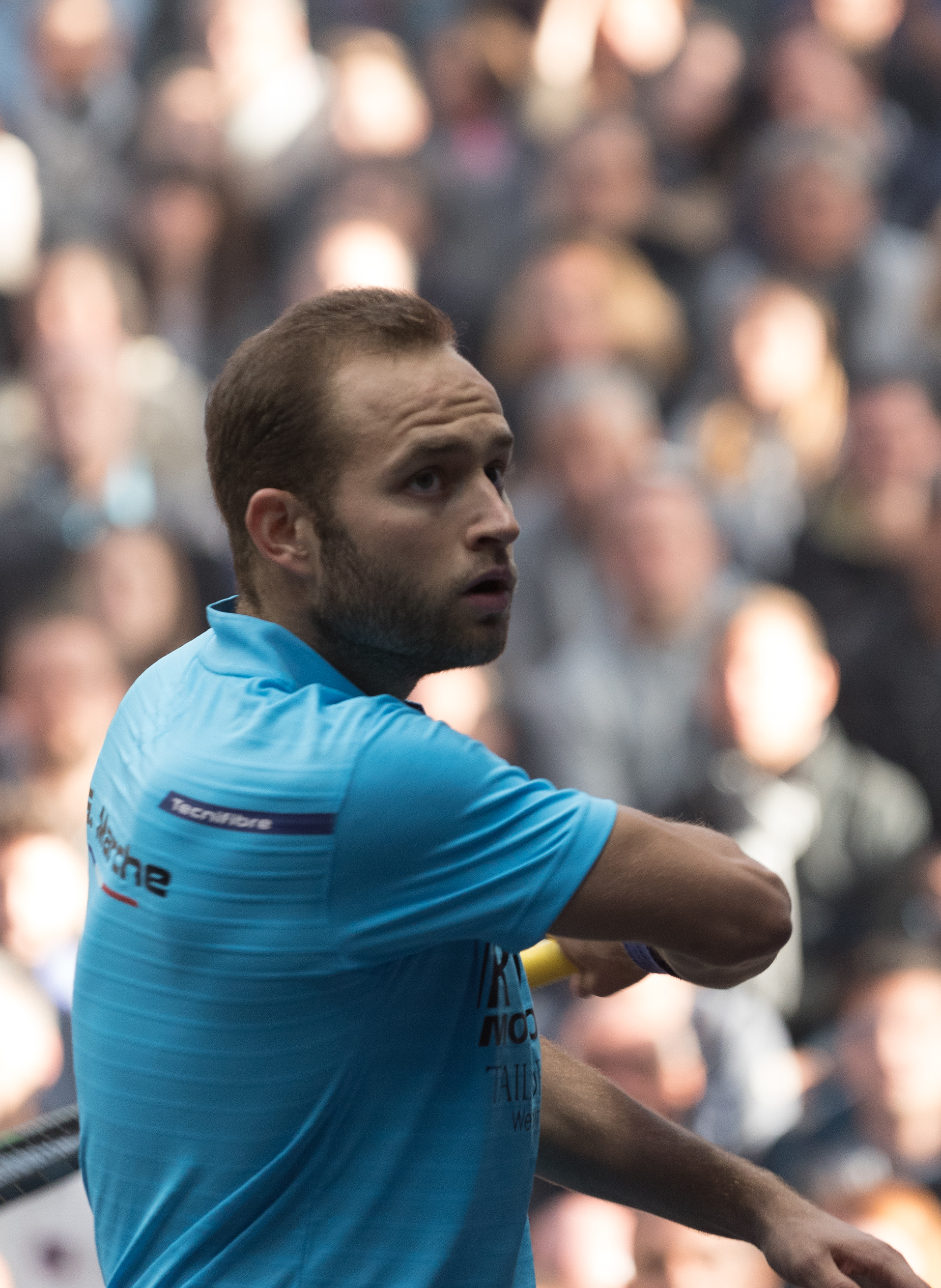

Personal information
- Nickname: The Acrobat
- Born: 3 March 1990 (age 36) Valence, France
- Height: 1.70 m (5 ft 7 in)
- Weight: 67 kg (148 lb)
- Website: www.squashclubvalence.free.fr

Sport
- Country: France
- Turned pro: 2009
- Retired: Active
- Racquet used: Tecnifibre Carboflex X-Speed 130

Men's singles
- Highest ranking: No. 11 (March 2022)
- Current ranking: No. 18 (14 July 2025)
- Title: 9
- Tour final: 11
- World Open: Rnd 3
Medal record
Men's squash
Representing France
The World Games
Silver medal – second place	2017 Wroclaw	Singles
Silver medal – second place	2022 Birmingham	Singles
World Team Championships
Bronze medal – third place	2013 Mulhouse	Team
Bronze medal – third place	2019 Washington D.C.	Team
Bronze medal – third place	2023 Tauranga	Team
Bronze medal – third place	2024 Hong Kong	Team
European Team Championships
Silver medal – second place	2022 Eindhoven	Team
Silver medal – second place	2023 Helsinki	Team
Silver medal – second place	2024 Uster	Team
Silver medal – second place	2025 Wrocław	Team
Bronze medal – third place	2026 Amsterdam	Team

Grégoire Marche (born 3 March 1990) is a professional squash player who represents France. He reached a career-high world ranking of World No. 11 in March 2022.

== Career ==
Marche won the silver medal at the 2017 World Games in the Squash competition. He also won the silver medal in this event at the 2022 World Games.

In December 2023, Marche won a bronze medal with France, at the 2023 Men's World Team Squash Championships in New Zealand.

After losing to fellow Frenchman Lucas Serme at the 2024 PSA Men's World Squash Championship in May, he won another bronze medal with France, at the 2024 Men's World Team Squash Championships in Hong Kong.

In May 2026 he won a bronze medal at the 2026 European Team Championships in Amsterdam.
