= Raphael Kandra =

German squash player (born 1990)

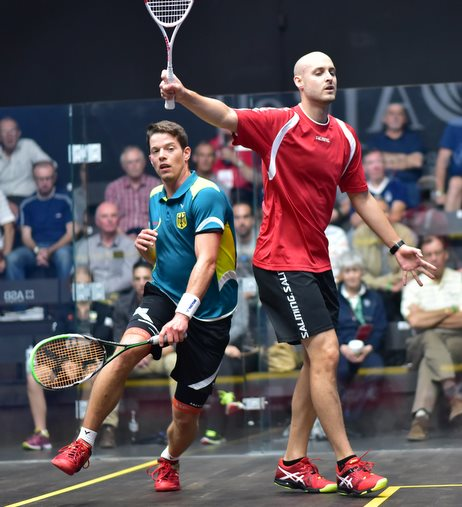
- Kandra (left) against Nicolas Müller 2017

Personal information
- Nicknames: The Giant Killer, The Goalkeeper
- Born: October 29, 1990 (age 35) Fürth, Germany
- Height: 1.82 m (6 ft 0 in)
- Weight: 81 kg (179 lb)

Sport
- Country: Germany
- Handedness: Left Handed
- Turned pro: 2009
- Coached by: Oliver Pettke
- Retired: Active
- Racquet used: Victor

Men's singles
- Highest ranking: 13 (May 2019)
- Current ranking: 33 (14 July 2025)
- Title: 16
- Military career
- Allegiance: Germany
- Branch: German Army
- Service years: 2010–present
- Rank: Hauptfeldwebel
- Unit: Panzerbrigade 21

Raphael Kandra (born 29 October 1990) is a professional Squash player from Germany. He reached a career high ranking of 13 in the world during May 2019.

== Career ==
Raphael Kandra reached a career-high world ranking of 13 in May 2019, after reaching the semi-final of the 2018 British Open - the first German to achieve this - and the quarter-final of the China Squash Open.

He won his first German National Championships title in 2018 against Valentin Rapp; he reached the final for the first time in 2013. He has represented the German national team on numerous European Squash Team Championships and World Team Championships. He won a bronze medal at the European Individual Championships in 2017.

In February 2025, Kandra won his 16th PSA title after securing victory in the Montreal Open during the 2024–25 PSA Squash Tour.
