= Shahjahan Khan =

Pakistani squash player (born 1995)

Personal information
- Born: March 5, 1995 (age 31) Quetta, Pakistan

Sport
- Country: United States
- Handedness: Right-handed
- Turned pro: 2011
- Retired: Active
- Racquet used: Harrow
- Highest ranking: No. 25 (October 2022)
- Current ranking: No. 58 (October 2024)
- Updated on October 2024

Shahjahan Khan (born March 5, 1995) is a Pakistani-American professional squash player. He is coached by his father and Pakistani former squash player Zarak Jahan Khan. As of October 2024, he was ranked number 58 in the world and the #2 ranked American.
