= Joel Makin =

Welsh squash player (born 1994)

Personal information
- Nickname: ‘The Golden Tiger’
- Born: 27 October 1994 (age 31) Pembrokeshire, Wales
- Height: 1.80 m (5 ft 11 in)
- Weight: 78 kg (172 lb)

Sport
- Country: British (Welsh)
- Handedness: Right Handed
- Turned pro: 2013
- Coached by: Independent
- Retired: Active
- Racquet used: Karakal Raw Pro 2.1 (Joel Makin Signature Racquet)

Men's singles
- Highest ranking: No. 4 (June 2025)
- Current ranking: No. 6 (December 2025)
- Title: 10
Medal record
Men's squash
Representing Wales
World Team Championships
Bronze medal – third place	2019 Washington D.C.	Team
Commonwealth Games
Silver medal – second place	2022 Birmingham	Singles
British Championships
Gold medal – first place	2021, 2024–25	singles
Welsh Championships
Gold medal – first place	2016, 2021, 2023–24	singles

Joel Makin (/ˈmeɪkɪn/, born 27 October 1994) is a Welsh professional squash player. He reached a career high ranking of 4 in the world during June 2025.

== Career ==
Makin was born in Haverfordwest, Pembrokeshire. He played squash at Aberdare Junior Squash Club under coaches Bob Gould, Clive Roberts and Dave Cope, and represented Wales at Under-13s level in 2007. He left Aberdare at 18 and, forgoing university, trained at West Warwickshire Club under the guidance of Rob Owen until parting ways to become independent.

He won the Kent Open in 2017, beating Joshua Masters in straight sets, and the Tring Open in 2018. He reached the semifinals of the men's singles squash competition at the 2018 Commonwealth Games, losing out to Mohd Nafiizwan Adnan in the bronze medal match. Makin qualified for the 2018 British Open Squash Championships where he lost in the first round to Mohamed Abouelghar. He beat the world number one, Mohamed El Shorbagy, to reach the quarterfinals of the Channel VAS Championships in October 2018.

Makin won a bronze medal at the 2019 Men's World Team Squash Championships after reaching the semi-finals, where Wales lost to eventual champions Egypt.

In February 2022, he was ranked number 8 in the World and 1 in Wales. At the 2022 Commonwealth Games in Birmingham, Makin was selected to represent Wales, and won a silver medal in the Men's Singles.

In 2024, Makin won his second British National Squash Championships, the first being achieved in 2021. In October 2024, Makin won his 7th and 8th PSA titles after securing victory in the Silicon Valley Open and Pittsburgh Open during the 2024–25 PSA Squash Tour.

In June 2025, he reached the semi final of the 2025 Men's British Open Squash Championship for the second consecutive year, losing to Mostafa Asal but shortly afterwards won the PSA Squash Tour Finals in Toronto to record his greatest feat to date.

Also in 2025, Makin won his third British National Squash Championships title, defeating Nick Wall in the final. Makin won his 10th PSA title in November 2025.

== PSA titles ==
Makin has won eight PSA titles:

- 1 – 2015 City of Greater Bendigo International (PSA5)
- 2 – 2017 Kent Open (PSA10)
- 3 – 2018 Tring Open (PSA15)
- 4 – 2022 Manchester Open
- 5 – Oxford Properties Canadian Open, Feb 2023
- 6 – 2024 Manchester Open, May 2024
- 7 – Silicon Valley Open PSA Gold, Oct 2024
- 8 - Pittsburgh Open, Feb 2025
- 9 - PSA Squash Tour Finals, June 2025
- 10 - HKFC Squash Open, Nov 2025
