= Squash rankings =

Squash rankings may refer to:

- Men's Squash World Rankings
- Women's Squash World Rankings
