= 2015–16 PSA World Tour =

Details
- Event name: 2015–16 PSA World Tour
- Dates: January 2015–July 2016
- Tournaments: 219
- Categories: World Championship: Men's/Women's; World Series: 15 (4), 15–16 (7); World Series Finals: Men's/Women's; PSA International (37); PSA Challenger (168)
- Website; PSA World Tour

Achievements
- World Number 1: Men : (Egypt) Mohd El Shorbagy (11 months) (France) Grégory Gaultier (1 month); Women : (Malaysia) Nicol David (8 months) (Egypt) Raneem El Weleily (4 months)
- World Champion: Men : (France) Grégory Gaultier; Women : (Egypt) Nour El Sherbini

The PSA World Tour 2015 is the international squash tour organised circuit organized by the Professional Squash Association (PSA) for the 2015 men's and women's squash season. The most important tournament in the series is the World Championship held in Bellevue, Washington in the United States. The tour features three categories of regular events, World Series, which feature the highest prize money and the best fields, International and Challenger.

In November 2014, the Women's Squash Association and the Professional Squash Association announced a historic merge between the two associations. A decision was reached that will see the Professional Squash Association operate as the governing body for both the women's and men's ranks from January 1, 2015.

== Calendar ==
Categories: International tournaments and more.

=== Key ===
World Championship
World Series
International 100
International 70
International 25/35/50
Challenger 5/10/15

=== January–July 2015 ===
==== January ====
Tournament	Date	Champion	Runner-Up	Semifinalists	Quarterfinalists
Open du Gard; Nîmes, France; Men : Challenger 5; 16 players - $5,000	3–4 January	(Switzerland) Reiko Peter w/o	(England) Angus Gillams	(England) Lyell Fuller (England) Reuben Phillips	(England) Mark Fuller (Switzerland) Jonas Dähler (France) Damien Volland (Switzerland) Manuel Wanner
Liberty Bell Open; Berwyn, United States; Women : WSA Tour 5; 16 players - $5,000	9–11 January	(England) Millie Tomlinson; 4–11, 11–6, 13–11, 11–8	(Pakistan) Maria Toorpakay	(England) Fiona Moverley (England) Georgina Stoker	(Egypt) Nouran El Torky (United States) Cecelia Cortes (Canada) Hollie Naughton (Canada) Sabrina Sobhy
J.P. Morgan Tournament of Champions; New York City, United States; Men : World Series; 32 players - $150,000 - Draw −−−−−− Women : World Series; 16 players - $123,000 - Draw	16–23 January	(Egypt) Mohamed El Shorbagy; 5–11, 11–9, 11–8, 12–10	(England) Nick Matthew	(Egypt) Amr Shabana (Colombia) Miguel Ángel Rodríguez	(France) Grégory Gaultier (Spain) Borja Golán (Egypt) Tarek Momen (Germany) Simon Rösner
J.P. Morgan Tournament of Champions; New York City, United States; Men : World Series; 32 players - $150,000 - Draw −−−−−− Women : World Series; 16 players - $123,000 - Draw	16–23 January	(Egypt) Raneem El Weleily; 9–11, 12–10, 11–4, 11–4	(England) Alison Waters	(England) Laura Massaro (Egypt) Nour El Sherbini	(Malaysia) Nicol David (France) Camille Serme (Egypt) Nour El Tayeb (United States) Amanda Sobhy
Holtrand Gas City Pro-Am; Medicine Hat, Canada; Men : Challenger 10; 16 players - $10,000	22–25 January	(Hong Kong) Leo Au; 11–7, 6–11, 9–11, 11–3, 11–5	(Malaysia) Asyraf Azan	(Canada) Shawn Delierre (New Zealand) Martin Knight	(Canada) Andrew Schnell (Taiwan) James Huang (Mexico) Eric Gálvez (Pakistan) Shahjahan Khan
Australia Day Challenge; Ipswich, Australia; Men : Challenger 5; 32 players - $5,000 −−−−−− Women : WSA Tour 5; 16 players - $5,000	23–25 January	(New Zealand) Paul Coll; 4–11, 10–12, 11–4, 11–6, 11–3	(New Zealand) Evan Williams	(New Zealand) Kashif Shuja (Australia) Matthew Karwalski	(Australia) Rhys Dowling (Australia) Joshua Larkin (Australia) Matthew Hopkin (New Zealand) Chris van der Salm
Australia Day Challenge; Ipswich, Australia; Men : Challenger 5; 32 players - $5,000 −−−−−− Women : WSA Tour 5; 16 players - $5,000	23–25 January	(New Zealand) Megan Craig; 11–7, 11–4, 11–4	(Australia) Lakeesha Rarere	(Australia) Lisa Camilleri (Malaysia) Aika Azman	(Australia) Samantha Calvert (Australia) Natalie Newton (Australia) Jasmine Chan (Australia) Aimee Slatter
Marlborough College Open; Marlborough, England; Men : Challenger 5; 16 players - $5,000	24–25 January	(England) Tom Ford; 11–7, 12–10, 7–11, 11–6	(England) Mark Fuller	(England) James Earles (England) Mike Harris	(Portugal) Rui Soares (England) Phil Nightingale (England) Adam Murrills (England) Ben Ford
Suburban Collection Motor City Open; Bloomfield Hills, United States; Men : International 70; 16 players - $70,000 - Draw	24–27 January	(Colombia) Miguel Ángel Rodríguez; 9–11, 11–7, 8–11, 11–7, 11–3	(South Africa) Stephen Coppinger	(France) Mathieu Castagnet (Hong Kong) Max Lee	(England) Peter Barker (Spain) Borja Golán (Egypt) Omar Mosaad (Australia) Cameron Pilley
Pittsburgh Open; Pittsburgh, United States; Men : International 25; 16 players - $25,000	29 Jan.–1 Feb.	(Egypt) Karim Abdel Gawad; 11–13, 11–7, 11–9, 11–7	(Scotland) Alan Clyne	(Australia) Ryan Cuskelly (England) Charles Sharpes	(France) Grégoire Marche (Egypt) Karim Ali Fathy (Peru) Diego Elías (Qatar) Abdulla Al-Tamimi
Winnipeg Winter Club Open; Winnipeg, Canada; Women : WSA Tour 15; 16 players - $15,000	29 Jan.–1 Feb.	(India) Dipika Pallikal; 11–4, 11–9, 11–8	(Egypt) Heba El Torky	(Mexico) Samantha Terán (Australia) Donna Urquhart	(New Zealand) Amanda Landers-Murphy (Republic of Ireland) Aisling Blake (United States) Olivia Blatchford (Egypt) Nadine Shahin
Savcor Finnish Open; Mikkeli, Finland; Men : Challenger 10; 16 players - $10,000	29 Jan.–1 Feb.	(Germany) Raphael Kandra; 10–12, 12–10, 11–6, 11–7	(England) Declan James	(England) James Earles (Egypt) Karim El Hammamy	(Egypt) Shehab Essam (Wales) Peter Creed (Australia) Steven Finitsis (Finland) Henrik Mustonen
Edinburgh Open; Edinburgh, Scotland; Women : WSA Tour 5; 16 players - $5,000	29 Jan.–1 Feb.	(England) Fiona Moverley; 11–7, 7–11, 12–10, 11–6	(Belgium) Nele Gilis	(England) Georgina Kennedy (Czech Republic) Lucie Fialová	(Australia) Tamika Saxby (England) Lucy Beecroft (England) Leonie Holt (Austria) Birgit Coufal
Cleveland Classic; Cleveland, United States; Women : WSA Tour 50; 16 players - $50,000 - Draw	31 Jan.–3 Feb.	(Malaysia) Nicol David; 11–5, 11–9, 11–4	(Egypt) Raneem El Weleily	(England) Laura Massaro (Egypt) Omneya Abdel Kawy	(France) Camille Serme (Malaysia) Low Wee Wern (Egypt) Nour El Tayeb (Hong Kong) Annie Au

==== February ====
Tournament	Date	Champion	Runner-Up	Semifinalists	Quarterfinalists
Case Swedish Open; Linköping, Sweden; Men : International 70; 16 players - $70,000 - Draw	5–8 February	(England) Nick Matthew; 11–9, 11–8, 11–7	(France) Grégory Gaultier	(Germany) Simon Rösner (South Africa) Stephen Coppinger	(England) James Willstrop (Australia) Cameron Pilley (England) Tom Richards (Egypt) Marwan El Shorbagy
Life Time Atlanta Open; Atlanta, United States; Men : Challenger 10; 16 players - $10,000	5–8 February	(England) Ben Coleman; 11–8, 7–11, 11–9, 11–5	(Australia) Zac Alexander	(Malaysia) Asyraf Azan (Qatar) Abdulla Al-Tamimi	(Canada) Andrew Schnell (United States) Todd Harrity (England) Arthur Gaskin (Egypt) Karim Ali Fathy
CSC Delaware Open; Greenville, United States; Women : WSA Tour 10; 16 players - $10,000	5–8 February	(Canada) Samantha Cornett; 11–7, 5–11, 11–6, 11–3	(Pakistan) Maria Toorpakay	(New Zealand) Amanda Landers-Murphy (Wales) Deon Saffery	(France) Cyrielle Peltier (Egypt) Nouran El Torky (England) Millie Tomlinson (Australia) Tamika Saxby
Squash Promotion Group & Heroes Open; Bielsko-Biała, Poland; Men : Challenger 5; 16 players - $5,000	13–15 February	(Denmark) Kristian Frost; 11–2, 11–5, 11–8	(Czech Republic) Jan Koukal	(England) Richie Fallows (Netherlands) Sebastiaan Weenink	(Wales) Joel Makin (Switzerland) Benjamin Fischer (England) George Parker (Germany) Tim Weber
Granite Open; Toronto, Canada; Women : WSA Silver 25; 16 players - $25,000	17–20 February	(England) Sarah-Jane Perry; 8–11, 11–6, 12–10, 11–7	(India) Dipika Pallikal	(United States) Amanda Sobhy (India) Joshna Chinappa	(England) Jenny Duncalf (Denmark) Line Hansen (Malaysia) Delia Arnold (Australia) Rachael Grinham
Oregon Open; Portland, United States; Men : Challenger 15; 16 players - $15,000	18–21 February	(Australia) Ryan Cuskelly; 11–5, 11–4, 11–7	(Egypt) Omar Abdel Meguid	(England) Adrian Grant (India) Saurav Ghosal	(Canada) Shawn Delierre (Scotland) Greg Lobban (United States) Christopher Gordon (England) Jaymie Haycocks
Global Relocations Israel Open; Herzliya, Israel; Men : Challenger 5; 16 players - $5,000	19–21 February	(Israel) Daniel Poleshchuk; 6–11, 6–11, 11–7, 11–3, 13–11	(France) Geoffrey Demont	(England) Oliver Pett (England) James Earles	(France) Baptiste Masotti (Spain) Bernat Jaume (England) Lyell Fuller (England) Richie Fallows
Pharco Alexandria Open by BrQthru; Alexandria, Egypt; Men : Challenger 10; 16 players - $10,000 −−−−−− Women : WSA Tour 5; 16 players - $5,000	19–22 February	(Egypt) Ali Farag; 8–11, 11–2, 11–8, 3–11, 11–6	(Egypt) Zahed Salem	(Egypt) Mohamed El Gawarhy (Egypt) Adel El Zarka	(Hong Kong) Yip Tsz Fung (Egypt) Ahmed Shohayeb (Pakistan) Khawaja Adil Maqbool (Egypt) Shehab Essam
Pharco Alexandria Open by BrQthru; Alexandria, Egypt; Men : Challenger 10; 16 players - $10,000 −−−−−− Women : WSA Tour 5; 16 players - $5,000	19–22 February	(Egypt) Hana Ramadan; 9–11, 11–7, 14–12, 11–6	(Egypt) Nouran El Torky	(Egypt) Zeina Mickawy (Egypt) Hania El Hammamy	(Egypt) Amina Yousry (Egypt) Menna Hamed (Egypt) Mayar Hany (Egypt) Nourhan Abdelnaby
Guilfoyle Financial PSA Classic; Toronto, Canada; Men : Challenger 5; 16 players - $5,000	25–28 February	(England) Declan James; 7–11, 11–7, 5–11, 11–5, 11–2	(Qatar) Abdulla Al-Tamimi	(Canada) Dane Sharp (England) Anthony Graham	(Canada) Michael McCue (Guyana) Sunny Seth (Cayman Islands) Cameron Stafford (Canada) Nick Sachvie
Mount Royal University Open; Calgary, Canada; Men : Challenger 5; 16 players - $5,000	25–28 February	(Canada) Graeme Schnell; 9–11, 11–8, 11–0, 11–1	(France) Baptiste Masotti	(England) Reuben Phillips (Canada) Andrew Schnell	(Argentina) Rodrigo Pezzota (Austria) Aqeel Rehman (Bermuda) Micah Franklin (England) Jonathan Maloney
Metro Squash Windy City Open; Chicago, United States; Men : World Series; 32 players - $150,000 - Draw −−−−−− Women : World Series; 32 players - $150,000 - Draw	26 Feb.–4 Mar.	(England) Nick Matthew; 11–7, 11–2, 11–7	(Egypt) Mohamed El Shorbagy	(France) Grégory Gaultier (Egypt) Marwan El Shorbagy	(England) Peter Barker (Egypt) Tarek Momen (Egypt) Omar Mosaad (Egypt) Karim Abdel Gawad
Metro Squash Windy City Open; Chicago, United States; Men : World Series; 32 players - $150,000 - Draw −−−−−− Women : World Series; 32 players - $150,000 - Draw	26 Feb.–4 Mar.	(Egypt) Raneem El Weleily; 12–14, 12–10, 11–7, 11–7	(Malaysia) Nicol David	(France) Camille Serme (Egypt) Nour El Tayeb	(Egypt) Nour El Sherbini (England) Alison Waters (Malaysia) Low Wee Wern (England) Emma Beddoes

==== March ====
Tournament	Date	Champion	Runner-Up	Semifinalists	Quarterfinalists
Emerson RC Pro Series; St. Louis, United States; Women : WSA Tour 15; 16 players - $15,000	5–8 March	(England) Emma Beddoes; 11–13, 11–5, 11–8, 11–2	(Egypt) Kanzy El Defrawy	(India) Joshna Chinappa (Denmark) Line Hansen	(Netherlands) Milou van der Heijden (Republic of Ireland) Aisling Blake (Egypt) Nadine Shahin (Japan) Misaki Kobayashi
Stratos Seattle Open; Seattle, United States; Men : Challenger 10; 16 players - $10,000 −−−−−− Women : WSA Tour 5; 16 players - $5,000	5–8 March	(Germany) Raphael Kandra; 11–6, 11–6, 11–7	(Egypt) Omar Abdel Meguid	(England) Declan James (India) Harinder Pal Sandhu	(Canada) Dane Sharp (Canada) Graeme Schnell (United States) Julian Illingworth (Pakistan) Shahjahan Khan
Stratos Seattle Open; Seattle, United States; Men : Challenger 10; 16 players - $10,000 −−−−−− Women : WSA Tour 5; 16 players - $5,000	5–8 March	(Australia) Donna Urquhart; 11–8, 9–11, 11–9, 11–8	(Hong Kong) Liu Tsz Ling	(Germany) Sina Wall (Norway) Lotte Eriksen	(England) Fiona Moverley (Hong Kong) Lee Ka Yi (India) Sachika Ingale (South Africa) Milnay Louw
Qualico Manitoba Open; Winnipeg, Canada; Men : Challenger 15; 16 players - $15,000	12–15 March	(Mexico) Alfredo Ávila; 11–6, 7–11, 11–7, 11–7	(New Zealand) Campbell Grayson	(Switzerland) Reiko Peter (Canada) Shahier Razik	(Canada) Shawn Delierre (England) Adrian Grant (Egypt) Karim Ali Fathy (New Zealand) Martin Knight
CFO Consulting Women's Squash Week; Calgary, Canada; Women : WSA Tour 15; 16 players - $15,000	12–15 March	(England) Emily Whitlock; 11–9, 8–11, 8–11, 11–5, 11–6	(Australia) Rachael Grinham	(Australia) Donna Urquhart (Denmark) Line Hansen	(Egypt) Nadine Shahin (Czech Republic) Lucie Fialová (England) Fiona Moverley (Canada) Jackie Moss
Club 250 Swiss Open; Schlieren, Switzerland; Men : Challenger 5; 16 players - $5,000	12–15 March	(Denmark) Kristian Frost; 13–11, 11–7, 11–6	(Wales) Joel Makin	(England) Joel Hinds (Israel) Daniel Poleshchuk	(Germany) Tim Weber (Switzerland) Manuel Wanner (Switzerland) Benjamin Fischer (Switzerland) Patrick Miescher
Montréal Open; Montreal, Canada; Women : WSA Tour 5; 16 players - $5,000	16–19 March	(France) Marie Stephan; 10–12, 11–6, 4–11, 11–7, 12–10	(France) Mélissa Alves	(Canada) Hollie Naughton (Mexico) Nayelly Hernández	(India) Sachika Ingale (France) Cyrielle Peltier (Canada) Alexandra Norman (Mexico) Diana García
Geneva Open; Pregny-Chambésy, Switzerland; Men : Challenger 5; 16 players - $5,000 −−−−−− Women : WSA Tour 5; 16 players - $5,000	20–22 March	(Scotland) Douglas Kempsell; 11–4, 8–11, 11–6, 11–1	(England) Mark Fuller	(Finland) Matias Tuomi (New Zealand) Lance Beddoes	(Spain) Carlos Cornes (Switzerland) Patrick Miescher (Switzerland) Benjamin Fischer (Switzerland) Jonas Dähler
Geneva Open; Pregny-Chambésy, Switzerland; Men : Challenger 5; 16 players - $5,000 −−−−−− Women : WSA Tour 5; 16 players - $5,000	20–22 March	(Egypt) Hania El Hammamy; 11–8, 11–9, 12–10	(England) Fiona Moverley	(France) Coline Aumard (France) Laura Pomportes	(Belgium) Nele Gilis (Australia) Tamika Saxby (Czech Republic) Anna Serme (South Africa) Milnay Louw
Canary Wharf Squash Classic; London, England; Men : International 50; 16 players - $50,000 - Draw	23–27 March	(England) Nick Matthew; 11–4, 11–9, 11–7	(Germany) Simon Rösner	(England) Peter Barker (England) Daryl Selby	(Spain) Borja Golán (Egypt) Fares Dessouky (Hong Kong) Max Lee (England) James Willstrop
Malaysian Squash Tour I Seri Menanti, Malaysia; Men : Challenger 5; 16 players - $5,000 −−−−−− Women : WSA Tour 5; 16 players - $5,000	24–27 March	(Hong Kong) Yip Tsz Fung; 14–12, 9–11, 11–5, 11–3	(Egypt) Youssef Soliman	(Hong Kong) Wong Chi Him (England) Adam Murrills	(Pakistan) Asim Khan (Finland) Jaakko Vähämaa (Malaysia) Valentino Bong (Malaysia) Muhammad Hannan
Malaysian Squash Tour I Seri Menanti, Malaysia; Men : Challenger 5; 16 players - $5,000 −−−−−− Women : WSA Tour 5; 16 players - $5,000	24–27 March	(Hong Kong) Liu Tsz Ling; 11–6, 11–3, 11–7	(Hong Kong) Tong Tsz Wing	(Hong Kong) Vanessa Chu (Malaysia) Vanessa Raj	(Malaysia) Zoe Foo Yuk Han (Malaysia) Rachel Arnold (Malaysia) Zulhijjah Binti Azan (Hong Kong) Lee Ka Yi

==== April ====
Tournament	Date	Champion	Runner-Up	Semifinalists	Quarterfinalists
3ème IG Markets Open de Paris; Paris, France; Men : International 25; 16 players - $25,000	1–4 April	(New Zealand) Paul Coll; 11–9, 11–9, 15–13	(France) Lucas Serme	(United States) Christopher Gordon (England) Charles Sharpes	(Kuwait) Abdullah Al-Muzayen (Netherlands) Sebastiaan Weenink (Qatar) Abdulla Al-Tamimi (Wales) Joel Makin
Bahria Town Women's International; Rawalpindi, Pakistan; Women : WSA Tour 10; 16 players - $10,000	1–4 April	(Pakistan) Maria Toorpakay; 11–9, 11–7, 6–11, 10–12, 12–10	(South Africa) Siyoli Waters	(Malaysia) Teh Min Jie (Hong Kong) Liu Tsz Ling	(Malaysia) Rachel Arnold (Egypt) Nadine Shahin (Egypt) Farah Abdel Meguid (India) Sachika Ingale
TRAC Oil & Gas North of Scotland Open; Aberdeen, Scotland; Men : Challenger 10; 16 players - $10,000	2–5 April	(Scotland) Greg Lobban; 3–11, 11–8, 6–11, 13–11, 11–4 (6th PSA title)	(England) Joel Hinds	(Spain) Alejandro Garbi (Spain) Carlos Cornes	(Netherlands) Piëdro Schweertman (England) Eddie Charlton (Egypt) Mohamed El Gawarhy (England) Nathan Lake
El Gouna International; El Gouna, Egypt; Men : World Series; 32 players - $150,000 - Draw	5–10 April	(Egypt) Ramy Ashour; 11–9, 11–6, 4–11, 10–12, 12–10	(Egypt) Mohamed El Shorbagy	(France) Grégory Gaultier (England) Nick Matthew	(England) James Willstrop (Egypt) Omar Mosaad (England) Peter Barker (England) Daryl Selby
Brest International Squash Classic; Brest, France; Men : Challenger 5; 16 players - $5,000	7–10 April	(England) Joel Hinds; 11–9, 11–2, 3–11, 11–2	(England) Mark Fuller	(Netherlands) Sebastiaan Weenink (England) Adam Murrills	(England) Ashley Davies (England) Lyell Fuller (France) Arthur Moineau (France) Auguste Dussourd
Texas Open; Plano, United States; Women : WSA Silver 35; 16 players - $35,000	9–12 April	(United States) Amanda Sobhy; 11–7, 8–11, 11–8, 11–4	(Egypt) Nour El Tayeb	(Hong Kong) Annie Au (Australia) Rachael Grinham	(Egypt) Nouran Gohar (England) Emma Beddoes (England) Jenny Duncalf (Australia) Donna Urquhart
CNS International Squash Championship; Karachi, Pakistan; Men : Challenger 15; 16 players - $15,000	11–14 April	(Pakistan) Nasir Iqbal; 11–9, 4–11, 9–11, 11–2, 11–8	(Pakistan) Danish Atlas Khan	(Pakistan) Saqib Yousaf (Pakistan) Farhan Mehboob	(Pakistan) Khawaja Adil Maqbool (Pakistan) Tayyab Aslam (Pakistan) Shahjahan Khan (Pakistan) Aamir Atlas Khan
Richmond Open; Richmond, United States; Women : WSA Tour 10; 16 players - $10,000	15–18 April	(Canada) Samantha Cornett; 7–11, 16–14, 11–7, 9–11, 11–6	(Japan) Misaki Kobayashi	(Wales) Tesni Evans (Egypt) Nouran El Torky	(Canada) Nikki Todd (Colombia) Catalina Peláez (France) Marie Stephan (Malaysia) Vanessa Raj
Austrian Open; Salzburg, Austria; Men : Challenger 5; 16 players - $5,000	15–18 April	(Wales) Peter Creed; 11–4, 11–8, 15–13	(Netherlands) Sebastiaan Weenink	(Germany) Tim Weber (Austria) Aqeel Rehman	(Finland) Jaakko Vähämaa (England) Mark Fuller (South Africa) Tristan Eysele (Austria) Jakob Dirnberger
Paderborn Open; Paderborn, Germany; Women : WSA Tour 5; 16 players - $5,000	15–18 April	(United States) Olivia Blatchford; 11–7, 7–11, 11–8, 11–7	(France) Cyrielle Peltier	(England) Fiona Moverley (Germany) Sina Wall	(Brazil) Thaisa Serafini (England) Leonie Holt (France) Chloé Mesic (England) Alison Thomson
Grasshopper Cup; Zürich, Switzerland; Men : International 70; 16 players - $70,000 - Draw	15–19 April	(France) Grégory Gaultier; 11–8, 11–3, 11–9	(Germany) Simon Rösner	(Egypt) Omar Mosaad (Colombia) Miguel Ángel Rodríguez	(India) Saurav Ghosal (Egypt) Ramy Ashour (France) Mathieu Castagnet (England) Daryl Selby
Garavan's West of Ireland Open; Galway, Republic of Ireland; Men : Challenger 10; 16 players - $10,000	16–19 April	(Egypt) Ali Farag; 11–6, 9–11, 11–9, 11–6	(England) James Earles	(Egypt) Shehab Essam (Australia) Rex Hedrick	(Egypt) Mohamed El Gawarhy (Scotland) Douglas Kempsell (Spain) Carlos Cornes (Belgium) Jan Van Den Herrewegen
Hazlow Electronics Rochester ProAm; Rochester, United States; Men : Challenger 5; 16 players - $6,000	16–19 April	(Mexico) Eric Gálvez; 11–7, 11–2, 11–6	(Jamaica) Christopher Binnie	(Guatemala) Josué Enríquez (Pakistan) Amaad Fareed	(Pakistan) Syed Hamzah Bukhari (Guatemala) Mauricio Sedano (Japan) Ryosei Kobayashi (Jamaica) Lewis Walters
Assore Central Gauteng Open; Johannesburg, South Africa; Men : Challenger 5; 32 players - $5,000 −−−−−− Women : WSA Tour 5; 16 players - $5,000	20–24 April	(Egypt) Mazen Gamal; 11–9, 11–13, 6–11, 12–10, 12–10	(England) Angus Gillams	(South Africa) Christo Potgieter (England) Chris Hall	(South Africa) Thoboki Mohohlo (South Africa) Devon Hendrikse (South Africa) Jean-Pierre Brits (South Africa) Mike Tootill
Assore Central Gauteng Open; Johannesburg, South Africa; Men : Challenger 5; 32 players - $5,000 −−−−−− Women : WSA Tour 5; 16 players - $5,000	20–24 April	(South Africa) Siyoli Waters; 11–6, 11–8, 11–6	(South Africa) Alexandra Fuller	(South Africa) Cheyna Tucker (Egypt) Farah Abdel Meguid	(South Africa) Elani Landman (South Africa) Milnay Louw (Egypt) Hana Essam Khedr (South Africa) Lume Landman
Malaysian Squash Tour II; Krubong, Malaysia; Men : Challenger 5; 16 players - $5,000 −−−−−− Women : WSA Tour 5; 16 players - $5,000	21–24 April	(Hong Kong) Yip Tsz Fung; 11–8, 11–3, 11–6	(Malaysia) Eain Yow	(Hong Kong) Tang Ming Hong (Hong Kong) Wong Chi Him	(Malaysia) Addeen Idrakie (Malaysia) Mohd Syafiq Kamal (Jordan) Mohammad Al-Saraj (Hong Kong) Ma Tsz-hei
Malaysian Squash Tour II; Krubong, Malaysia; Men : Challenger 5; 16 players - $5,000 −−−−−− Women : WSA Tour 5; 16 players - $5,000	21–24 April	(Netherlands) Milou van der Heijden; 12–10, 11–5, 6–11, 14–12	(Malaysia) Vanessa Raj	(Malaysia) Rachel Arnold (Malaysia) Teh Min Jie	(Australia) Sarah Cardwell (Malaysia) Zulhijjah Binti Azan (Malaysia) Sivasangari Subramaniam (Malaysia) Zoe Foo Yuk Han
Andorra Open; Anyós, Andorra; Men : International 25; 16 players - $25,000	22–25 April	(Egypt) Karim Abdel Gawad; 11–7, 12–10, 12–10	(England) Tom Richards	(France) Grégoire Marche (England) Adrian Waller	(England) Chris Simpson (Australia) Steven Finitsis (Germany) Jens Schoor (South Africa) Shaun Le Roux
Northern Ontario Open; Sudbury, Canada; Men : International 25; 16 players - $25,000	22–25 April	(Australia) Ryan Cuskelly; 12–10, 11–7, 11–8	(Netherlands) Laurens Jan Anjema	(Mexico) César Salazar (Canada) Shawn Delierre	(Peru) Diego Elías (Botswana) Alister Walker (New Zealand) Campbell Grayson (United States) Christopher Gordon
GillenMarkets Irish Squash Open; Dublin, Republic of Ireland; Men : Challenger 15; 16 players - $15,000 −−−−−− Women : WSA Tour 15; 16 players - $15,000	22–25 April	(Egypt) Ali Farag; 11–8, 5–11, 11–2, 9–11, 11–9	(France) Lucas Serme	(Egypt) Mazen Hesham (New Zealand) Paul Coll	(Egypt) Karim Ali Fathy (Scotland) Alan Clyne (Australia) Rex Hedrick (Egypt) Shehab Essam
GillenMarkets Irish Squash Open; Dublin, Republic of Ireland; Men : Challenger 15; 16 players - $15,000 −−−−−− Women : WSA Tour 15; 16 players - $15,000	22–25 April	(Republic of Ireland) Madeline Perry; 11–8, 11–5, 11–9	(Guyana) Nicolette Fernandes	(Republic of Ireland) Aisling Blake (Australia) Donna Urquhart	(England) Emily Whitlock (France) Coline Aumard (United States) Olivia Blatchford (Malaysia) Delia Arnold
Charlotte Open; Charlotte, United States; Men : Challenger 5; 16 players - $5,000	23–26 April	(Mexico) Eric Gálvez; 11–6, 12–14, 11–8, 9–11, 11–8	(Jamaica) Lewis Walters	(England) Tom Ford (England) Reuben Phillips	(Pakistan) Amaad Fareed (England) Alex Ingham (India) Vikram Malhotra (Paraguay) Nicolás Caballero
FMC International Squash Championship; Lahore, Pakistan; Men : Challenger 15; 16 players - $15,000	24–27 April	(Pakistan) Nasir Iqbal; 11–8, 11–4, ret.	(Pakistan) Aamir Atlas Khan	(Pakistan) Farhan Mehboob (Pakistan) Farhan Zaman	(Pakistan) Israr Ahmed (Pakistan) Saqib Yousaf (Pakistan) Danish Atlas Khan (Pakistan) Tayyab Aslam
Keith Grainger Memorial Open; Cape Town, South Africa; Men : Challenger 5; 32 players - $5,000 −−−−−− Women : WSA Tour 5; 16 players - $5,000	27 Apr.–1 May	(England) Nathan Lake; 11–7, 11–6, 11–8	(England) Angus Gillams	(South Africa) Jean-Pierre Brits (England) Chris Hall	(South Africa) Christo Potgieter (South Africa) Rodney Durbach (Brazil) Manoel Pereira (England) Anthony Graham
Keith Grainger Memorial Open; Cape Town, South Africa; Men : Challenger 5; 32 players - $5,000 −−−−−− Women : WSA Tour 5; 16 players - $5,000	27 Apr.–1 May	(South Africa) Siyoli Waters; 12–10, 20–18, 11–7	(Egypt) Farah Abdel Meguid	(South Africa) Elani Landman (South Africa) Milnay Louw	(South Africa) Cheyna Tucker (Egypt) Hana Essam Khedr (South Africa) Alexandra Fuller (South Africa) Lume Landman
Houston Open; Houston, United States; Men : International 25; 16 players - $25,000	30 Apr–3 May	(Egypt) Mazen Hesham; 11–6, 11–5, 11–5	(England) Adrian Grant	(Peru) Diego Elías (South Africa) Steve Coppinger	(England) Tom Ford (Australia) Ryan Cuskelly (Egypt) Karim Ali Fathy (Mexico) César Salazar

==== May ====
Tournament	Date	Champion	Runner-Up	Semifinalists	Quarterfinalists
Waikato Golden Jubilee Open; Hamilton, New Zealand; Men : Challenger 5; 16 players - $5,000	1–3 May	(New Zealand) Evan Williams; 11–5, 11–9, 11–7	(New Zealand) Lance Beddoes	(New Zealand) Ben Grindrod (New Zealand) Kashif Shuja	(New Zealand) Chris van der Salm (South Korea) Woo Chang-wook (New Zealand) Zac Millar (Australia) Alex Eustace
Western Province Open; Cape Town, South Africa; Men : Challenger 5; 32 players - $5,000	4–8 May	(Egypt) Mazen Gamal; 11–6, 11–7, 11–6	(England) Angus Gillams	(South Africa) Thoboki Mohohlo (South Africa) Jean-Pierre Brits	(South Africa) Rodney Durbach (South Africa) Gary Wheadon (Brazil) Diego Gobbi (South Africa) Christo Potgieter
Courtcare Open; Chorley, England; Women : WSA Tour 15; 16 players - $15,000	6–9 May	(England) Emily Whitlock; 12–10, 11–7, 11–6	(Australia) Donna Lobban	(Japan) Misaki Kobayashi (United States) Olivia Blatchford	(Wales) Tesni Evans (England) Sarah-Jane Perry (Canada) Samantha Cornett (Republic of Ireland) Aisling Blake
Christchurch Vets Ipswich Open; Ipswich, England; Men : Challenger 5; 16 players - $5,000	7–10 May	(Republic of Ireland) Arthur Gaskin; 11–8, 4–11, 12–10, 8–11, 11–6	(England) Chris Fuller	(Scotland) Douglas Kempsell (England) Patrick Rooney	(England) Mark Fuller (England) Robert Downer (England) Mike Harris (England) Lyell Fuller
NT Open; Darwin, Australia; Men : Challenger 10; 32 players - $10,000 −−−−−− Women : WSA Tour 10; 32 players - $10,000	8–10 May	(New Zealand) Paul Coll; 8–11, 13–11, 11–9, 11–6	(Australia) Zac Alexander	(Canada) Dane Sharp (Taiwan) James Huang	(New Zealand) Evan Williams (New Zealand) Ben Grindrod (New Zealand) Chris van der Salm (Hong Kong) Alex Lau
NT Open; Darwin, Australia; Men : Challenger 10; 32 players - $10,000 −−−−−− Women : WSA Tour 10; 32 players - $10,000	8–10 May	(New Zealand) Amanda Landers-Murphy; 12–10, 11–3, 11–4	(New Zealand) Megan Craig	(Australia) Christine Nunn (Australia) Sarah Cardwell	(Hong Kong) Liu Tsz Ling (Australia) Lakeesha Rarere (Malaysia) Zulhijjah Binti Azan (Malaysia) Teh Min Jie
Regatas Resistencia Open; Resistencia, Argentina; Men : Challenger 10; 16 players - $10,000	13–16 May	(Canada) Shawn Delierre; 4–11, 11–6, 12–10, 11–5	(Argentina) Leandro Romiglio	(Argentina) Robertino Pezzota (Netherlands) Piëdro Schweertman	(Wales) Peter Creed (United States) Todd Harrity (New Zealand) Martin Knight (Austria) Aqeel Rehman
Allam British Open; Hull, England; Men : World Series; 32 players - $150,000 - Draw −−−−−− Women : World Series; 32 players - $100,000 - Draw	11–17 May	(Egypt) Mohamed El Shorbagy; 11–9, 6–11, 5–11, 11–8, 11–5	(France) Grégory Gaultier	(England) Nick Matthew (Colombia) Miguel Ángel Rodríguez	(Egypt) Tarek Momen (Egypt) Mazen Hesham (France) Mathieu Castagnet (Germany) Simon Rösner
Allam British Open; Hull, England; Men : World Series; 32 players - $150,000 - Draw −−−−−− Women : World Series; 32 players - $100,000 - Draw	11–17 May	(France) Camille Serme; 11–3, 11–5, 8–11, 11–8	(England) Laura Massaro	(Malaysia) Nicol David (Malaysia) Delia Arnold	(Egypt) Raneem El Weleily (Egypt) Nour El Sherbini (England) Sarah-Jane Perry (New Zealand) Joelle King
Life Time Vegas Open; Las Vegas, United States; Men : Challenger 10; 16 players - $10,000	14–17 May	(New Zealand) Campbell Grayson; 11–2, 11–6, 11–4	(England) Tom Ford	(England) Angus Gillams (United States) Christopher Gordon	(Egypt) Mohammed Reda (Jamaica) Christopher Binnie (India) Kush Kumar (Pakistan) Amaad Fareed
South Australian Open; Adelaide, Australia; Men : Challenger 5; 32 players - $5,000 −−−−−− Women : WSA Tour 5; 16 players - $5,000	14–17 May	(New Zealand) Evan Williams; 11–7, 11–9, 12–10	(Taiwan) James Huang	(Australia) Joshua Larkin (Canada) Dane Sharp	(Australia) Rhys Dowling (Hong Kong) Tsun Hei Yuen (New Zealand) Chris van der Salm (Australia) Thomas Calvert
South Australian Open; Adelaide, Australia; Men : Challenger 5; 32 players - $5,000 −−−−−− Women : WSA Tour 5; 16 players - $5,000	14–17 May	(Hong Kong) Liu Tsz Ling; 11–7, 11–7, 11–7	(Australia) Sarah Cardwell	(Australia) Lakeesha Rarere (Australia) Christine Nunn	(Australia) Jessica Turnbull (Australia) Natalie Newton (Australia) Selena Shaikh (Australia) Samantha Calvert
Malaysian Squash Tour III; George Town, Malaysia; Men : Challenger 5; 16 players - $5,000 −−−−−− Women : WSA Tour 5; 16 players - $5,000	20–22 May	(Hong Kong) Yip Tsz Fung; 11–8, 8–11, 11–6, 11–9	(Malaysia) Ivan Yuen	(Malaysia) Elvinn Keo (Malaysia) Eain Yow	(Malaysia) Addeen Idrakie (India) Ravi Dixit (Hong Kong) Wong Chi Him (Pakistan) Saqib Yousaf
Malaysian Squash Tour III; George Town, Malaysia; Men : Challenger 5; 16 players - $5,000 −−−−−− Women : WSA Tour 5; 16 players - $5,000	20–22 May	(Hong Kong) Vanessa Chu; 12–10, 11–4, 11–9	(Malaysia) Vanessa Raj	(Japan) Satomi Watanabe (Malaysia) Rachel Arnold	(France) Marie Stephan (United States) Latasha Khan (Hong Kong) Lee Ka Yi (Malaysia) Sivasangari Subramaniam
Sharm El Sheikh International; Sharm El Sheikh, Egypt; Men : International 25; 32 players - $25,000 −−−−−− Women : WSA Silver 25; 16 players - $25,000	19–23 May	(Egypt) Karim Abdel Gawad; 11–6, 8–11, 11–9, 6–11, 12–10	(Egypt) Ali Farag	(Egypt) Mazen Hesham (Egypt) Omar Abdel Meguid	(Egypt) Fares Dessouky (Egypt) Mohamed Abouelghar (Egypt) Andrew Shoukry (Egypt) Zahed Mohamed
Sharm El Sheikh International; Sharm El Sheikh, Egypt; Men : International 25; 32 players - $25,000 −−−−−− Women : WSA Silver 25; 16 players - $25,000	19–23 May	(Wales) Tesni Evans; 12–10, 6–11, 7–11, 11–7, 11–5	(Egypt) Heba El Torky	(Egypt) Yathreb Adel (Denmark) Line Hansen	(Egypt) Salma Hany (Guyana) Nicolette Fernandes (Wales) Deon Saffery (France) Coline Aumard
Paraguay Open; Asunción, Paraguay; Men : Challenger 10; 16 players - $10,000	20–23 May	(Argentina) Robertino Pezzota; 11–9, 11–1, 11–4	(Canada) Shawn Delierre	(Malaysia) Asyraf Azan (Wales) Peter Creed	(Austria) Aqeel Rehman (Netherlands) Piëdro Schweertman (United States) Todd Harrity (New Zealand) Martin Knight
Rathbones Jersey Squash Classic; Saint Clement, Jersey; Men : Challenger 5; 16 players - $5,000	21–24 May	(England) Nathan Lake; 11–6, 11–8, 11–7	(England) Ashley Davies	(England) Mike Harris (Wales) Joel Makin	(England) Joshua Masters (Bermuda) Micah Franklin (Portugal) Rui Soares (England) Lyell Fuller
City of Perth WA Open; Perth, Australia; Men : Challenger 5; 32 players - $5,000 −−−−−− Women : WSA Tour 5; 32 players - $5,000	22–24 May	(Australia) Joshua Larkin; 11–8, 8–11, 11–3, 11–8	(South Korea) Ko Young-jo	(Jamaica) Lewis Walters (Canada) Dane Sharp	(Australia) Rhys Dowling (Australia) Thomas Calvert (Australia) David Ilich (England) Mark Broekman
City of Perth WA Open; Perth, Australia; Men : Challenger 5; 32 players - $5,000 −−−−−− Women : WSA Tour 5; 32 players - $5,000	22–24 May	(New Zealand) Megan Craig; 11–9, 11–8, 7–11, 11–9	(Australia) Christine Nunn	(Australia) Lakeesha Rarere (Australia) Jessica Turnbull	(Australia) Sue Hillier (Australia) Zoe Petrovansky (Australia) Lynette Jackson (Australia) Linda Towill
Inno Wood Open; Kriens, Switzerland; Men : Challenger 5; 16 players - $5,000	23–24 May	(Switzerland) Reiko Peter; 11–9, 11–9, 11–0	(England) George Parker	(Belgium) Jan Van Den Herrewegen (Switzerland) Benjamin Fischer	(England) Chris Fuller (Switzerland) Patrick Miescher (Germany) Tim Weber (Switzerland) Jonas Dähler
Malaysian Squash Tour IV; Kuala Lumpur, Malaysia; Men : Challenger 5; 16 players - $5,000 −−−−−− Women : WSA Tour 5; 16 players - $5,000	27–29 May	(Malaysia) Elvinn Keo; 11–5, 11–5, 7–11, 11–3	(Malaysia) Sanjay Singh	(Malaysia) Ivan Yuen (Malaysia) Eain Yow	(Pakistan) Saqib Yousaf (Pakistan) Asim Khan (Malaysia) Mohd Syafiq Kamal (Pakistan) Muhammad Shoaib
Malaysian Squash Tour IV; Kuala Lumpur, Malaysia; Men : Challenger 5; 16 players - $5,000 −−−−−− Women : WSA Tour 5; 16 players - $5,000	27–29 May	(Hong Kong) Vanessa Chu; 11–4, 6–11, 11–8, 11–7	(Malaysia) Teh Min Jie	(Hong Kong) Lee Ka Yi (Malaysia) Vanessa Raj	(Malaysia) Rachel Arnold (Malaysia) Sivasangari Subramaniam (Malaysia) Nazihah Hanis (Malaysia) Zoe Foo Yuk Han
HKFC International; Hong Kong, China; Men : International 25; 16 players - $25,000 −−−−−− Women : WSA Silver 25; 16 players - $25,000	27–30 May	(Hong Kong) Max Lee; 9–11, 11–6, 11–1, 11–9	(India) Saurav Ghosal	(Netherlands) Laurens Jan Anjema (Egypt) Omar Abdel Meguid	(England) Tom Richards (Hong Kong) Leo Au (Australia) Rex Hedrick (Malaysia) Nafiizwan Adnan
HKFC International; Hong Kong, China; Men : International 25; 16 players - $25,000 −−−−−− Women : WSA Silver 25; 16 players - $25,000	27–30 May	(Hong Kong) Annie Au; 11–7, 8–11, 9–11, 11–4, 11–8	(Egypt) Habiba Mohamed	(India) Joshna Chinappa (England) Jenny Duncalf	(Hong Kong) Joey Chan (Australia) Rachael Grinham (Malaysia) Delia Arnold (Netherlands) Milou van der Heijden
VIII Torneo Internacional PSA Sporta; Guatemala City, Guatemala; Men : International 35; 16 players - $35,000 - Draw	28–31 May	(Egypt) Omar Mosaad; 11–5, 8–11, 11–7, 11–6	(Mexico) César Salazar	(Scotland) Alan Clyne (Egypt) Mohamed Abouelghar	(England) Chris Simpson (Australia) Ryan Cuskelly (Netherlands) Piëdro Schweertman (England) Eddie Charlton
Sekisui Open; Kriens, Switzerland; Men : Challenger 10; 16 players - $10,000	28–31 May	(Denmark) Kristian Frost; 11–8, 11–7, 7–11, 7–11, 11–5	(England) Tom Ford	(England) Chris Fuller (England) Lyell Fuller	(England) Ashley Davies (Germany) Tim Weber (Switzerland) Jonas Dähler (Switzerland) Benjamin Fischer
City of Kalgoorlie & Boulder Golden Open; Kalgoorlie, Australia; Men : Challenger 5; 16 players - $5,000	30 May–1 Jun.	(Australia) Joshua Larkin; 11–8, 11–9, 11–7	(Jamaica) Lewis Walters	(South Korea) Park Jong-myoung (Canada) Dane Sharp	(Australia) Darcy Evans (Australia) Rhys Dowling (Japan) Ben Takamizawa (South Korea) Ko Young-jo

==== June ====
Tournament	Date	Champion	Runner-Up	Semifinalists	Quarterfinalists
Costa Rica Open; San José, Costa Rica; Men : Challenger 15; 16 players - $15,000	3–6 June	(Peru) Diego Elías; 11–9, 11–7, 11–5	(Scotland) Alan Clyne	(Canada) Shawn Delierre (Mexico) Alfredo Ávila	(Egypt) Mohammed Reda (Mexico) Arturo Salazar (Wales) Peter Creed (Mexico) Eric Gálvez
Open International d'Angers; Angers, France; Men : Challenger 10; 16 players - $10,000	3–6 June	(Netherlands) Piëdro Schweertman; 11–8, 9–11, 11–8, 11–4	(Pakistan) Tayyab Aslam	(England) Robert Downer (Spain) Carlos Cornes	(Spain) Alejandro Garbi (Australia) Steven Finitsis (France) Geoffrey Demont (Israel) Daniel Poleshchuk
Pilatus Cup; Kriens, Switzerland; Men : Challenger 5; 16 players - $5,000	4–6 June	(Switzerland) Reiko Peter; 11–7, 11–7, 11–8	(Austria) Aqeel Rehman	(Wales) Joel Makin (Czech Republic) Jan Koukal	(Switzerland) Benjamin Fischer (Czech Republic) Daniel Mekbib (Switzerland) Jonas Dähler (Germany) Tim Weber
Fitzherbert Rowe Lawyers NZ International Classic; Palmerston North, New Zealand; Men : Challenger 15; 16 players - $15,000 −−−−−− Women : WSA Tour 10; 16 players - $10,000	4–7 June	(Malaysia) Nafiizwan Adnan; 11–8, 6–11, 11–2, 11–7	(England) Declan James	(New Zealand) Campbell Grayson (New Zealand) Paul Coll	(India) Harinder Pal Sandhu (Australia) Rex Hedrick (New Zealand) Martin Knight (Germany) Raphael Kandra
Fitzherbert Rowe Lawyers NZ International Classic; Palmerston North, New Zealand; Men : Challenger 15; 16 players - $15,000 −−−−−− Women : WSA Tour 10; 16 players - $10,000	4–7 June	(Hong Kong) Joey Chan; 5–11, 10–12, 11–2, 11–7, 11–5	(Japan) Misaki Kobayashi	(New Zealand) Amanda Landers-Murphy (New Zealand) Megan Craig	(Australia) Christine Nunn (Germany) Sina Wall (New Zealand) Ellie Epke (Australia) Sarah Cardwell
Select Gaming Kent Open; Maidstone, England; Men : Challenger 10; 16 players - $10,000	4–7 June	(England) Charles Sharpes; 11–4, 6–11, 11–8, 6–11, 12–10	(England) George Parker	(England) Joel Hinds (England) Richie Fallows	(England) Joshua Masters (Denmark) Kristian Frost (England) Jaymie Haycocks (England) Ben Ford
Dafi Consult Invest Bucharest Open; Cluj-Napoca, Romania; Women : WSA Tour 5; 16 players - $5,000	4–7 June	(England) Millie Tomlinson; 11–7, 11–4, 11–7	(England) Fiona Moverley	(England) Victoria Temple-Murray (France) Chloé Mesic	(Russia) Ekaterina Marusan (England) Leonie Holt (Netherlands) Tessa ter Sluis (Czech Republic) Anna Serme
Alexandria International; Alexandria, Egypt; Women : International 100; 32 players - $100,000 - Draw	5–10 June	(Egypt) Raneem El Weleily; 11–6, 11–5, 11–9	(Egypt) Omneya Abdel Kawy	(Malaysia) Nicol David (England) Laura Massaro	(Egypt) Nour El Sherbini (England) Alison Waters (France) Camille Serme (Egypt) Nour El Tayeb
DoubleDot Media Christchurch Open; Christchurch, New Zealand; Men : Challenger 10; 16 players - $10,000	11–14 June	(England) Declan James; 8–11, 12–10, 11–9, 11–6	(India) Harinder Pal Sandhu	(Australia) Rex Hedrick (Germany) Raphael Kandra	(Taiwan) James Huang (New Zealand) Paul Coll (New Zealand) Lance Beddoes (Australia) Matthew Hopkin
Squashways Canterbury Open; Christchurch, New Zealand; Women : WSA Tour 5; 16 players - $5,000	12–14 June	(New Zealand) Megan Craig; 4–11, 12–10, 11–8, 5–11, 11–8	(South Africa) Siyoli Waters	(Germany) Sina Wall (New Zealand) Ellie Epke	(Australia) Lakeesha Rarere (Australia) Jessica Turnbull (New Zealand) Nadia Hubbard (South Korea) Eum Hwa-yeong
Invercargill Licensing Trust NZ Southern Open; Invercargill, New Zealand; Men : Challenger 15; 16 players - $15,000 −−−−−− Women : WSA Tour 10; 16 players - $10,000	18–21 June	(Germany) Raphael Kandra; 4–11, 8–11, 11–7, 11–4, 11–7	(Hong Kong) Yip Tsz Fung	(New Zealand) Paul Coll (New Zealand) Lance Beddoes	(New Zealand) Campbell Grayson (New Zealand) Martin Knight (Taiwan) James Huang (Finland) Matias Tuomi
Invercargill Licensing Trust NZ Southern Open; Invercargill, New Zealand; Men : Challenger 15; 16 players - $15,000 −−−−−− Women : WSA Tour 10; 16 players - $10,000	18–21 June	(Japan) Misaki Kobayashi; 6–11, 11–9, 11–6, 11–5	(New Zealand) Megan Craig	(South Africa) Siyoli Waters (New Zealand) Amanda Landers-Murphy	(Germany) Sina Wall (Australia) Sarah Cardwell (Australia) Christine Nunn (Australia) Jessica Turnbull
British Virgin Islands Open; Road Town, British Virgin Islands; Men : Challenger 5; 16 players - $5,000	25–27 June	(Wales) Peter Creed; 11–3, 11–4, 11–3	(Mexico) Jesús Camacho	(British Virgin Islands) Joe Chapman (Cayman Islands) Cameron Stafford	(England) Anthony Graham (England) Joe Green (Guatemala) Antonio de la Torre (United States) Dylan Cunningham
Gibraltar Open; Gibraltar; Men : Challenger 5; 16 players - $5,000	26–27 June	(Denmark) Kristian Frost; 11–6, 11–4, 11–4	(Spain) Alejandro Garbi	(Netherlands) Piëdro Schweertman (Czech Republic) Jan Koukal	(England) Lyell Fuller (Austria) Jakob Dirnberger (Spain) Iker Pajares (England) Robert Downer
Tournament of Pyramides; Le Port-Marly, France; Women : WSA Tour 15; 16 players - $15,000	30 Jun.–3 Jul.	(England) Emily Whitlock; 6–11, 11–6, 11–9, 11–3	(Netherlands) Natalie Grinham	(Belgium) Nele Gilis (Egypt) Mayar Hany	(Australia) Donna Urquhart (Czech Republic) Lucie Fialová (United States) Latasha Khan (France) Cyrielle Peltier

==== July ====
Tournament	Date	Champion	Runner-Up	Semifinalists	Quarterfinalists
Contrex Challenge Cup; Hong Kong, China; Men : PSA 5; 16 players - $5,000 −−−−−− Women : PSA 5; 16 players - $5,000	8–11 July	(Hong Kong) Wong Chi Him; 11–6, 11–8, 5–11, 11–9	(Hong Kong) Yip Tsz Fung	(India) Mahesh Mangaonkar (South Korea) Woo Chang-wook	(Hong Kong) Chris Lo (Hong Kong) Henry Leung (South Korea) Jeong Dae-hoon (Hong Kong) Ma Tsz-hei
Contrex Challenge Cup; Hong Kong, China; Men : PSA 5; 16 players - $5,000 −−−−−− Women : PSA 5; 16 players - $5,000	8–11 July	(Hong Kong) Lee Ka Yi; 11–9, 11–5, 11–13, 11–7	(Hong Kong) Ho Tze-Lok	(United States) Latasha Khan (Egypt) Amina Yousry	(Hong Kong) Vanessa Chu (Hong Kong) Choi Uen Shan (Hong Kong) Tong Tsz Wing (Hong Kong) Carmen Lee
3rd Open Provence Chateau-Arnoux; Château-Arnoux, France; Men : PSA 5; 16 players - $5,000	10–12 July	(Czech Republic) Jan Koukal; 11–8, 8–11, 6–11, 11–4, 11–7	(England) Chris Fuller	(England) Robert Downer (England) Mark Fuller	(France) Benjamin Aubert (England) Joe Green (Spain) Hugo Varela (England) Chris Hall
Madeira Island Open; Caniço, Portugal; Men : PSA 5; 16 players - $5,000	23–25 July	(Czech Republic) Jan Koukal; 6–11, 11–9, 11–8, 11–6	(England) George Parker	(England) Lyell Fuller (Spain) Alejandro Garbi	(England) Mark Fuller (South Africa) Tristan Eysele (Portugal) Rui Soares (England) Joe Green
City Of Devonport Tasmanian Open; Devonport, Australia; Men : PSA 5 −−−−−− 32 players - $5,000; Women : PSA 5; 16 players - $5,000	24–26 July	(India) Kush Kumar; 11–4, 11–5, 13–11	(England) Jaymie Haycocks	(New Zealand) Chris van der Salm (Republic of Ireland) Sean Conroy	(Czech Republic) Martin Švec (England) Robert Downer (Switzerland) Manuel Wanner (Australia) Thomas Calvert
City Of Devonport Tasmanian Open; Devonport, Australia; Men : PSA 5 −−−−−− 32 players - $5,000; Women : PSA 5; 16 players - $5,000	24–26 July	(Australia) Christine Nunn; 11–6, 11–6, 11–2	(South Africa) Cheyna Tucker	(Australia) Lisa Camilleri (Australia) Sarah Cardwell	(India) Sachika Ingale (South Africa) Alexandra Fuller (Australia) Selena Shaikh (Australia) Jasmine Chan
Malaysian Squash Tour V Kuching, Malaysia; Men : PSA 5; 16 players - $5,000 −−−−−− Women : PSA 5; 16 players - $5,000	29–31 July	(Malaysia) Addeen Idrakie; 11–6, 11–4, 11–6	(Malaysia) Mohd Syafiq Kamal	(Malaysia) Elvinn Keo (Hong Kong) Wong Chi Him	(Jordan) Ahmad Al-Saraj (Hong Kong) Henry Leung (Egypt) Basem Makram (Hong Kong) Tang Ming Hong
Malaysian Squash Tour V Kuching, Malaysia; Men : PSA 5; 16 players - $5,000 −−−−−− Women : PSA 5; 16 players - $5,000	29–31 July	(Hong Kong) Tong Tsz Wing; 11–13, 4–11, 11–8, 11–4, 11–7	(Malaysia) Rachel Arnold	(Malaysia) Vanessa Raj (Malaysia) Zulhijjah Binti Azan	(Malaysia) Teh Min Jie (Egypt) Hana Moataz (Malaysia) Ooi Kah Yan (Malaysia) Ma Si Yi
Victorian Open; Melbourne, Australia; Men : PSA 15; 32 players - $15,000 −−−−−− Women : PSA 15; 32 players - $16,000	29 Jul.–2 Aug.	(Australia) Ryan Cuskelly; 12–10, 13–11, 11–9	(Scotland) Greg Lobban	(Australia) Steven Finitsis (India) Mahesh Mangaonkar	(England) Jaymie Haycocks (New Zealand) Paul Coll (India) Kush Kumar (Wales) Joel Makin
Victorian Open; Melbourne, Australia; Men : PSA 15; 32 players - $15,000 −−−−−− Women : PSA 15; 32 players - $16,000	29 Jul.–2 Aug.	(India) Joshna Chinappa; 11–5, 11–4, 11–9	(Denmark) Line Hansen	(South Africa) Siyoli Waters (Australia) Christine Nunn	(Australia) Donna Urquhart (New Zealand) Amanda Landers-Murphy (Australia) Rachael Grinham (New Zealand) Megan Craig

=== August 2015–July 2016 ===
==== August ====
Tournament	Date	Champion	Runner-Up	Semifinalists	Quarterfinalists
Abierto Colombiano; Bogotá, Colombia; Men : International 50; 16 players - $50,000 - Draw −−−−−− Women : Challenger 15; 16 players - $15,000	5–8 August	(Mexico) Alfredo Ávila; 11–9, 8–11, 11–4, 11–8	(India) Saurav Ghosal	(Colombia) Miguel Ángel Rodríguez (England) Peter Barker	(Spain) Borja Golán (Egypt) Zahed Mohamed (Peru) Diego Elías (Mexico) César Salazar
Abierto Colombiano; Bogotá, Colombia; Men : International 50; 16 players - $50,000 - Draw −−−−−− Women : Challenger 15; 16 players - $15,000	5–8 August	(England) Victoria Lust; 11–5, 11–4, 11–5	(Colombia) Catalina Peláez	(Mexico) Samantha Terán (Canada) Nikki Todd	(Mexico) Diana García (Canada) Melina Turk (Brazil) Thaisa Serafini (Mexico) Nayelly Hernández
Australian Open; Melbourne, Australia; Men : International 25; 32 players - $28,750 −−−−−− Women : International 25; 32 players - $28,750	5–9 August	(New Zealand) Paul Coll; 11–7, 5–11, 11–6, 11–5	(Australia) Cameron Pilley	(Australia) Ryan Cuskelly (Pakistan) Nasir Iqbal	(Australia) Steven Finitsis (Malaysia) Nafiizwan Adnan (Australia) Rex Hedrick (Hong Kong) Leo Au
Australian Open; Melbourne, Australia; Men : International 25; 32 players - $28,750 −−−−−− Women : International 25; 32 players - $28,750	5–9 August	(New Zealand) Joelle King; 11–5, 11–6, 11–9	(Hong Kong) Annie Au	(Australia) Rachael Grinham (Malaysia) Delia Arnold	(Denmark) Line Hansen (Australia) Donna Urquhart (Hong Kong) Joey Chan (India) Joshna Chinappa
Grand Sport Armenian Challenger; Yerevan, Armenia; Men : Challenger 5; 16 players - $5,000	6–9 August	(Egypt) Mazen Gamal; 11–9, 11–6, 11–6	(England) Nathan Lake	(Czech Republic) Jan Koukal (Egypt) Belal Nawar	(Egypt) Khaled Mostafa (Egypt) Ahmed Hussein (Iran) Mohammad Sadeghpour (England) Josh Taylor
Malaysian Tour Nº6; Kangar, Malaysia; Men : Challenger 5; 16 players - $5,000 −−−−−− Women : Challenger 5; 16 players - $5,000	12–14 August	(Malaysia) Ivan Yuen; 11–9, 8–11, 11–4, 11–8	(Taiwan) James Huang	(Malaysia) Muhammad Hannan (Malaysia) Sanjay Singh	(Hong Kong) Chi-Him Wong (Pakistan) Muhammad Hassan (Hong Kong) Cheuk Yan Tang (Malaysia) Asyraf Azan
Malaysian Tour Nº6; Kangar, Malaysia; Men : Challenger 5; 16 players - $5,000 −−−−−− Women : Challenger 5; 16 players - $5,000	12–14 August	(Hong Kong) Liu Tsz Ling; 11–5, 11–4, 11–5	(Malaysia) Vanessa Raj	(Hong Kong) Carmen Lee (Malaysia) Zulhijjah Binti Azan	(Malaysia) Teh Min Jie (Malaysia) Sivasangari Subramaniam (Malaysia) Rachel Arnold (Malaysia) Zoe Foo
Colony Ford Lincoln NSA Open; Toronto, Canada; Men : Challenger 5; 16 players - $5,000	12–15 August	(Pakistan) Shahjahan Khan; 6–11, 12–10, 11–2, 4–11, 11–7	(Republic of Ireland) Arthur Gaskin	(Canada) Michael McCue (Mexico) Jesús Camacho	(United States) Chris Hanson (Nigeria) Babatunde Ajagbe (Canada) David Baillargeon (British Virgin Islands) Joe Chapman
Greater Shepparton City Council International; Shepparton, Australia; Men : Challenger 5; 32 players - $5,000	13–16 August	(Scotland) Douglas Kempsell; 11–7, 11–8, 11–5	(England) Joshua Masters	(Australia) Joshua Larkin (England) Jaymie Haycocks	(Pakistan) Tayyab Aslam (South Korea) Ko Young-jo (India) Kush Kumar (South Korea) Park Jong-myoung
City of Greater Bendigo International; Bendigo, Australia; Men : Challenger 5; 32 players - $5,000 −−−−−− Women : Challenger 5; 16 players - $5,000	20–23 August	(Wales) Joel Makin; 11–4, 11–5, 11–7	(Australia) Joshua Larkin	(Pakistan) Tayyab Aslam (India) Kush Kumar	(England) Joshua Masters (South Korea) Ko Young-jo (Malaysia) Valentino Bong (Malaysia) Addeen Idrakie
City of Greater Bendigo International; Bendigo, Australia; Men : Challenger 5; 32 players - $5,000 −−−−−− Women : Challenger 5; 16 players - $5,000	20–23 August	(France) Cyrielle Peltier; 6–11, 11–6, 11–7, 11–9	(Netherlands) Milou van der Heijden	(Hong Kong) Vanessa Chu (South Korea) Yang Yeon-soo	(Australia) Christine Nunn (Australia) Sarah Cardwell (Hong Kong) Tong Tsz Wing (Australia) Jessica Turnbull
Zenit Black Sea Open; Odesa, Ukraine; Men : Challenger 5; 16 players - $5,000	20–23 August	(Italy) Stéphane Galifi; 11–8, 11–7, 12–10	(Egypt) Ahmed Hussein	(Czech Republic) Jan Koukal (Switzerland) Manuel Wanner	(Egypt) Ahmed Effat Ashoush (South Africa) Christo Potgieter (South Africa) Jean-Pierre Brits (Ukraine) Denis Podgorny
Legacy Wealth Belfast Open; Belfast, Northern Ireland; Men : Challenger 5; 16 players - $5,000	27–30 August	(England) Joel Hinds; 11–9, 8–11, 6–11, 11–9, 11–7	(England) Angus Gillams	(Spain) Edmon López (England) Kyle Finch	(England) Patrick Rooney (England) Phil Nightingale (South Africa) Jean-Pierre Brits (England) Nick Mulvey
NSW Open; Thornleigh, Sydney, Australia; Men : Challenger 5; 32 players - $5,000 −−−−−− Women : Challenger 5; 16 players - $5,000	28–30 August	(Australia) Zac Alexander; 11–7, 11–7, 11–7	(Scotland) Douglas Kempsell	(Australia) Matthew Hopkin (Australia) Rhys Dowling	(Australia) Joshua Larkin (England) Lewis Doughty (South Korea) Ko Young-jo (Czech Republic) Ondřej Uherka
NSW Open; Thornleigh, Sydney, Australia; Men : Challenger 5; 32 players - $5,000 −−−−−− Women : Challenger 5; 16 players - $5,000	28–30 August	(Netherlands) Milou van der Heijden; 11–8, 7–11, 7–11, 11–5, 11–8	(France) Cyrielle Peltier	(Hong Kong) Tong Tsz Wing (South Korea) Yang Yeon-soo	(Malaysia) Rachel Arnold (Australia) Lakeesha Rarere (Australia) Jessica Turnbull (Australia) Lisa Camilleri
Suez Helsinki Summer Challenger; Helsinki, Finland; Men : Challenger 5; 16 players - $5,000	28–30 August	(Finland) Miko Äijänen; 12–10, 11–9, 12–10	(France) Baptiste Masotti	(Egypt) Saadeldin Abouaish (Austria) Aqeel Rehman	(Finland) Jaakko Vähämaa (France) Auguste Dussourd (Wales) Emyr Evans (Finland) Jami Äijänen

==== September ====
Tournament	Date	Champion	Runner-Up	Semifinalists	Quarterfinalists
Open International de Nantes; Nantes, France; Men : Challenger 10; 16 players - $10,000 - Draw	2–6 September	(France) Grégoire Marche; 11–8, 11–2, 11–9	(Finland) Henrik Mustonen	(France) Lucas Serme (England) Eddie Charlton	(Netherlands) Piëdro Schweertman (Germany) Jens Schoor (Pakistan) Khawaja Adil Maqbool (Belgium) Jan Van Den Herrewegen
Stars On The Bund China Open; Shanghai, China; Men : International 100; 16 players - $100,000 - Draw −−−−−− Women : International 50; 16 players - $58,000 - Draw	3–6 September	(France) Grégory Gaultier; 11–6, 11–2, 11–4	(Egypt) Marwan El Shorbagy	(Egypt) Omar Mosaad (Hong Kong) Leo Au	(France) Mathieu Castagnet (Hong Kong) Max Lee (Spain) Borja Golán (England) Tom Richards
Stars On The Bund China Open; Shanghai, China; Men : International 100; 16 players - $100,000 - Draw −−−−−− Women : International 50; 16 players - $58,000 - Draw	3–6 September	(Egypt) Raneem El Weleily; 13–11, 11–7, 11–7	(Egypt) Nouran Gohar	(France) Camille Serme (United States) Amanda Sobhy	(Malaysia) Nicol David (England) Sarah-Jane Perry (England) Emma Beddoes (Hong Kong) Annie Au
JSW NSCI Open; Mumbai, India; Men : Challenger 15; 16 players - $15,000 −−−−−− Women : Challenger 15; 16 players - $15,000	3–6 September	(England) Adrian Waller; 11–9, 11–2, 12–14, 11–6	(India) Mahesh Mangaonkar	(Egypt) Karim El Hammamy (Egypt) Mazen Gamal	(England) Jaymie Haycocks (England) Ben Coleman (Egypt) Mohammed Reda (India) Harinder Pal Sandhu
JSW NSCI Open; Mumbai, India; Men : Challenger 15; 16 players - $15,000 −−−−−− Women : Challenger 15; 16 players - $15,000	3–6 September	(India) Joshna Chinappa; 11–8, 11–9, 11–6	(Egypt) Habiba Mohamed	(Egypt) Hania El Hammamy (England) Fiona Moverley	(Hong Kong) Joey Chan (Egypt) Nouran El Torky (Hong Kong) Lee Ka Yi (England) Millie Tomlinson
Insel Brüggen Open; Brüggen, Germany; Men : Challenger 5; 16 players - $5,000	3–6 September	(Finland) Jaakko Vähämaa; 13–11, 6–11, 11–9, 9–11, 11–8	(England) Chris Fuller	(Australia) Aqeel Rehman (Netherlands) Sebastiaan Weenink	(Israel) Daniel Poleshchuk (England) Phil Nightingale (United States) Mike Lewis (England) Mark Fuller
North Coast Open; Coffs Harbour, Australia; Men : Challenger 5; 32 players - $5,000	4–6 September	(Scotland) Douglas Kempsell; 5–11, 11–8, 11–6, 13–11	(Australia) Joshua Larkin	(Czech Republic) Martin Švec (New Zealand) Ben Grindrod	(Pakistan) Kashif Shuja (Malaysia) Mithran Selvaratnam (Australia) Thomas Calvert (Australia) Mike Corren
Malaysian Tour Nº7; Kuantan, Malaysia; Men : Challenger 5; 16 players - $5,000 −−−−−− Women : Challenger 5; 16 players - $5,000	9–12 September	(Malaysia) Addeen Idrakie; 11–9, 11–8, 11–7	(England) Nathan Lake	(Taiwan) James Huang (Malaysia) Elvinn Keo	(Malaysia) Mohd Syafiq Kamal (Malaysia) Valentino Bong (Jordan) Ahmad Al-Saraj (Malaysia) Muhammad Hannan
Malaysian Tour Nº7; Kuantan, Malaysia; Men : Challenger 5; 16 players - $5,000 −−−−−− Women : Challenger 5; 16 players - $5,000	9–12 September	(France) Coline Aumard; 11–5, 10–12, 11–7, 11–9	(Malaysia) Rachel Arnold	(Egypt) Hana Ramadan (Malaysia) Teh Min Jie	(Malaysia) Zulhijjah Binti Azan (Malaysia) Chan Yiwen (Egypt) Amina Yousry (Malaysia) Aika Azman
JSW CCI International; Mumbai, India; Men : International 35; 16 players - $35,000	10–13 September	(Spain) Borja Golán; 11–6, 11–4, 10–12, 11–5	(India) Saurav Ghosal	(Egypt) Mazen Hesham (South Africa) Shaun Le Roux	(Egypt) Omar Abdel Meguid (Egypt) Mohamed Abouelghar (Egypt) Karim Ali Fathi (England) Adrian Waller
Champion Fiberglass Open; Houston, United States; Men : Challenger 10; 16 players - $10,000	10–13 September	(England) Declan James; 11–8, 5–11, 11–7, 11–4	(Pakistan) Danish Atlas Khan	(England) Eddie Charlton (Finland) Henrik Mustonen	(Pakistan) Farhan Zaman (Mexico) Eric Gálvez (Qatar) Abdulla Al-Tamimi (Canada) Andrew Schnell
AJ Bell British Grand Prix; Manchester, England; Men : International 70; 16 players - $70,000 - Draw	11–14 September	(Egypt) Mohamed El Shorbagy; 11–7, 12–10, 9–11, 11–6	(England) Nick Matthew	(France) Grégory Gaultier (Egypt) Karim Abdel Gawad	(Colombia) Miguel Ángel Rodríguez (England) Daryl Selby (England) Peter Barker (England) James Willstrop
XVI Trofeu Internacional Ciutat de Barcelona; Barcelona, Spain; Men : Challenger 5; 16 players - $5,000	15–17 September	(England) George Parker; 11–7, 11–2, 7–11, 11–8	(England) Chris Fuller	(Spain) Hugo Varela (Spain) Iker Pajares	(Spain) Alejandro Garbi (France) Geoffrey Demont (Israel) Daniel Poleshchuk (Spain) Aitor Zunzunegui
NASH Cup; London, Canada; Men : Challenger 15; 16 players - $15,000 −−−−−− Women : Challenger 5; 16 players - $5,000	15–19 September	(England) Declan James; 11–9, 13–11, 11–7	(Qatar) Abdulla Al-Tamimi	(England) Richie Fallows (Denmark) Kristian Frost	(Finland) Henrik Mustonen (Peru) Diego Elías (Canada) Shawn Delierre (England) Eddie Charlton
NASH Cup; London, Canada; Men : Challenger 15; 16 players - $15,000 −−−−−− Women : Challenger 5; 16 players - $5,000	15–19 September	(Pakistan) Maria Toorpakay; 11–5, 10–12, 11–7, 11–9	(England) Millie Tomlinson	(France) Cyrielle Peltier (England) Victoria Temple-Murray	(Canada) Nikki Todd (Canada) Hollie Naughton (Canada) Danielle Letourneau (Chile) Giselle Delgado
Charlottesville Open; Charlottesville, United States; Men : International 35; 16 players - $35,000	16–19 September	(South Africa) Stephen Coppinger; 11–8, 8–11, 11–7, 11–3	(Australia) Ryan Cuskelly	(Egypt) Ali Farag (New Zealand) Campbell Grayson	(Egypt) Karim Abdel Gawad (Australia) Cameron Pilley (United States) Christopher Gordon (Scotland) Alan Clyne
Macau Open; Macau, China; Men : International 50; 16 players - $50,000 - Draw −−−−−− Women : International 50; 16 players - $50,000 - Draw	17–20 September	(Hong Kong) Max Lee; 11–9, 11–6, 11–0	(Egypt) Fares Dessouky	(Malaysia) Nafiizwan Adnan (Egypt) Tarek Momen	(Egypt) Omar Mosaad (Spain) Borja Golán (Egypt) Omar Abdel Meguid (Egypt) Marwan El Shorbagy
Macau Open; Macau, China; Men : International 50; 16 players - $50,000 - Draw −−−−−− Women : International 50; 16 players - $50,000 - Draw	17–20 September	(England) Laura Massaro; 11–8, 11–3, 11–9	(Egypt) Nouran Gohar	(England) Alison Waters (Hong Kong) Annie Au	(Egypt) Nour El Tayeb (New Zealand) Joelle King (Australia) Donna Urquhart (England) Emily Whitlock
Kiva Club Open; Santa Fe, United States; Men : Challenger 5; 16 players - $5,000	17–20 September	(United States) Chris Hanson; 11–9, 4–11, 11–7, 11–4	(Mexico) Jesús Camacho	(Jordan) Ahmad Alzabidi (United States) Faraz Khan	(France) Auguste Dussourd (Mexico) Juan G Domínguez (England) Anthony Graham (Guatemala) Italo Bonatti
BDO Northfield Cup; Waterloo, Canada; Men : Challenger 5; 16 players - $5,000	23–26 September	(Argentina) Leandro Romiglio; 11–7, 5–11, 11–3, 11–4	(Belgium) Jan Van Den Herrewegen	(England) Richie Fallows (Switzerland) Reiko Peter	(England) Reuben Phillips (Canada) David Baillargeon (Guyana) Sunil Seth (Canada) Nick Sachvie
JSW Kolkata International; Kolkata, India; Men : International 35; 16 players - $35,000	24–27 September	(India) Saurav Ghosal; 11–7, 11–2, 11–7	(Egypt) Marwan El Shorbagy	(England) Chris Simpson (South Africa) Stephen Coppinger	(Australia) Rex Hedrick (Egypt) Zahed Mohamed (Scotland) Greg Lobban (India) Mahesh Mangaonkar
Prague Open; Prague, Czech Republic; Men : Challenger 5; 16 players - $5,000 −−−−−− Women : Challenger 5; 16 players - $5,000	25–27 September	(England) Mark Fuller; 11–9, 7–11, 8–11, 11–7, 11–9	(Scotland) Douglas Kempsell	(Czech Republic) Jan Koukal (Netherlands) Sebastiaan Weenink	(Switzerland) Benjamin Fischer (Czech Republic) Martin Švec (Israel) Daniel Poleshchuk (England) Nick Mulvey
Prague Open; Prague, Czech Republic; Men : Challenger 5; 16 players - $5,000 −−−−−− Women : Challenger 5; 16 players - $5,000	25–27 September	(Netherlands) Natalie Grinham; 14–16, 11–8, 12–10, 11–5	(Wales) Deon Saffery	(Egypt) Mayar Hany (Egypt) Hana Moataz	(England) Victoria Temple-Murray (France) Chloé Mesic (Egypt) Menna Nasser (Germany) Sina Kandra
Netsuite Open; San Francisco, United States; Men : International 100; 16 players - $100,000 - Draw −−−−−− Women : International 25; 16 players - $25,000	25–29 September	(Egypt) Ramy Ashour; 11–7, 9–11, 11–5, 11–4	(England) Nick Matthew	(France) Grégory Gaultier (Colombia) Miguel Ángel Rodríguez	(Germany) Simon Rösner (Australia) Cameron Pilley (England) James Willstrop (Australia) Ryan Cuskelly
Netsuite Open; San Francisco, United States; Men : International 100; 16 players - $100,000 - Draw −−−−−− Women : International 25; 16 players - $25,000	25–29 September	(United States) Amanda Sobhy; 11–5, 4–11, 11–5, 12–10	(England) Sarah-Jane Perry	(Denmark) Line Hansen (England) Victoria Lust	(Egypt) Habiba Mohamed (United States) Olivia Blatchford (Guyana) Nicolette Fernandes (Wales) Tesni Evans
Wasatch Funds Salt Lake City Open; Salt Lake City, United States; Men : Challenger 10; 16 players - $10,000	29 Sept.–2 Oct.	(England) Ben Coleman; 11–3, 8–11, 12–10, 2–11, 13–11	(New Zealand) Martin Knight	(Finland) Henrik Mustonen (Pakistan) Farhan Zaman	(Wales) Peter Creed (Canada) Michael McCue (Argentina) Leandro Romiglio (Republic of Ireland) Arthur Gaskin

==== October ====
Tournament	Date	Champion	Runner-Up	Semifinalists	Quarterfinalists
Grays Norwegian Open; Oslo, Norway; Men : Challenger 15; 16 players - $15,000	1–4 October	(Egypt) Mohammed Reda; 11–6, 11–4, 16–14	(England) Joe Lee	(England) Charles Sharpes (Denmark) Kristian Frost	(Netherlands) Piëdro Schweertman (Germany) Jens Schoor (England) Eddie Charlton (Australia) Steven Finitsis
Courtcraft Nick Matthew Acad. Steel City Open; Sheffield, England; Men : Challenger 10; 16 players - $10,000	1–4 October	(England) Declan James; 11–8, 8–11, 8–11, 14–12, 11–8	(England) George Parker	(England) Richie Fallows (England) Jaymie Haycocks	(Australia) Matthew Hopkin (England) Joel Hinds (Belgium) Jan Van Den Herrewegen (England) James Earles
Carol Weymuller Open; Brooklyn, NY, United States; Women : International 50; 16 players - $50,000 - Draw	1–5 October	(Egypt) Nour El Sherbini; 11–5, 11–6, 11–3	(New Zealand) Joelle King	(Egypt) Raneem El Weleily (India) Joshna Chinappa	(Egypt) Salma Hany (Egypt) Omneya Abdel Kawy (England) Sarah-Jane Perry (Hong Kong) Joey Chan
Serena Hotels CAS Intl. Championship; Islamabad, Pakistan; Men : International 25; 16 players - $25,000	3–6 October	(Egypt) Mohamed Abouelghar; 7–11, 11–9, 13–11, 6–11, 11–9	(Egypt) Omar Abdel Meguid	(Pakistan) Nasir Iqbal (Egypt) Karim Ali Fathi	(Egypt) Shehab Essam (Pakistan) Farhan Mehboob (Pakistan) Israr Ahmed (Pakistan) Tayyab Aslam
LiveStuff Open; Tuxedo Park, United States; Women : Challenger 5; 16 players - $5,000	4–6 October	(Belgium) Nele Gilis; 7–11, 11–9, 13–11, 6–11, 11–9	(Canada) Danielle Letourneau	(Canada) Nikki Todd (Canada) Hollie Naughton	(England) Georgina Stoker (Mexico) Diana García (France) Mélissa Alves (United States) Reyna Pacheco
LOC Charing Cross Classic; London, England; Men : Challenger 5; 16 players - $5,000	6–9 October	(Israel) Daniel Poleshchuk; 11–7, 11–7, 12–10	(Australia) Matthew Hopkin	(England) James Earles (France) Geoffrey Demont	(England) Chris Hall (England) Lyell Fuller (England) Kyle Finch (England) Patrick Rooney
AnyPresence Open; McLean, United States; Men : Challenger 10; 16 players - $10,000	7–10 October	(Pakistan) Farhan Zaman; 8–11, 8–11, 11–6, 11–9, 11–6	(Qatar) Abdulla Al-Tamimi	(Canada) Shawn Delierre (Finland) Jaakko Vähämaa	(Canada) Shahier Razik (Mexico) Eric Gálvez (Mexico) Arturo Salazar (Finland) Olli Tuominen
Delaware Investments U.S. Open; Philadelphia, United States; Men : World Series; 32 players - $150,000 - Draw −−−−−− Women : World Series; 32 players - $150,000 - Draw	10–17 October	(France) Grégory Gaultier; 11–6, 11–3, 11–5	(Egypt) Omar Mosaad	(Egypt) Mohamed El Shorbagy (England) Nick Matthew	(England) Daryl Selby (France) Mathieu Castagnet (Germany) Simon Rösner (Egypt) Fares Dessouky
Delaware Investments U.S. Open; Philadelphia, United States; Men : World Series; 32 players - $150,000 - Draw −−−−−− Women : World Series; 32 players - $150,000 - Draw	10–17 October	(England) Laura Massaro; 11–6, 9–11, 6–11, 11–8, 11–7	(Egypt) Nour El Tayeb	(France) Camille Serme (Egypt) Omneya Abdel Kawy	(Malaysia) Nicol David (Egypt) Raneem El Weleily (India) Dipika Pallikal (Egypt) Nour El Sherbini
Securian Open; St. Paul, United States; Men : Challenger 5; 16 players - $5,000	14–17 October	(Jamaica) Christopher Binnie; 12–10, 11–6, 8–11, 13–11	(Jamaica) Lewis Walters	(England) Ashley Davies (England) Reuben Phillips	(United States) Julian Illingworth (Finland) Jaakko Vähämaa (South Africa) Thoboki Mohohlo (Jordan) Ahmad Alzabidi
Black Knight & Copacabana WOCC; Niagara-on-the-Lake, Canada; Men : Challenger 5; 16 players - $5,000	15–18 October	(Netherlands) Piëdro Schweertman; 11–8, 11–2, 11–4	(Netherlands) Sebastiaan Weenink	(Canada) Michael McCue (Colombia) Andrés Herrera	(Trinidad and Tobago) Kale Wilson (England) Anthony Graham (Mexico) Jesús Camacho (Guyana) Sunil Seth
Open International des Volcans; Clermont-Ferrand, France; Women : Challenger 5; 16 players - $5,000	16–18 October	(England) Fiona Moverley; 11–8, 11–2, 11–4	(France) Chloé Mesic	(Canada) Danielle Letourneau (England) Georgina Kennedy	(South Africa) Milnay Louw (Czech Republic) Anna Serme (Scotland) Alison Thomson (South Africa) Alexandra Fuller
JSW Indian Squash Circuit Chennai; Chennai, India; Men : Challenger 10; 16 players - $10,000 −−−−−− Women : Challenger 10; 16 players - $10,000	19–22 October	(Egypt) Mohammed Reda; 13–11, 11–7, 11–9	(India) Harinder Pal Sandhu	(Egypt) Mazen Gamal (Egypt) Youssef Soliman	(Wales) Joel Makin (Malaysia) Mohd Syafiq Kamal (Kuwait) Abdullah Al-Muzayen (India) Kush Kumar
JSW Indian Squash Circuit Chennai; Chennai, India; Men : Challenger 10; 16 players - $10,000 −−−−−− Women : Challenger 10; 16 players - $10,000	19–22 October	(Hong Kong) Liu Tsz Ling; 7–11, 6–11, 11–1, 11–8, 11–7	(England) Millie Tomlinson	(Hong Kong) Tong Tsz Wing (Egypt) Nouran El Torky	(Malaysia) Zulhijjah Binti Azan (Netherlands) Milou van der Heijden (Hong Kong) Lee Ka Yi (Malaysia) Vanessa Raj
CLIC Sargent St George's Hill Open; Weybridge, England; Men : International 25; 16 players - $25,000	21–24 October	(England) Chris Simpson; 11–8, 11–2, 9–11, 11–1	(England) Daryl Selby	(France) Lucas Serme (England) Tom Richards	(Germany) Jens Schoor (Denmark) Kristian Frost Olesen (England) George Parker (England) Charles Sharpes
Tournoi Féminin Val de Marne; Créteil, France ' Women : Challenger 5; 16 players - $5,000	22–24 October	(Netherlands) Natalie Grinham; 11–4, 5–11, 11–8, 11–6	(England) Georgina Kennedy	(Scotland) Alison Thomson (France) Chloé Mesic	(Czech Republic) Anna Serme (Austria) Birgit Coufal (France) Cyrielle Peltier (Egypt) Nada Abbas
Welaptega Bluenose Classic; Halifax, Canada; Men : International 35; 16 players - $35,000	22–25 October	(Australia) Ryan Cuskelly; 16–14, 11–8, 11–6	(Egypt) Karim Abdel Gawad	(Canada) Andrew Schnell (Egypt) Marwan El Shorbagy	(New Zealand) Campbell Grayson (Botswana) Alister Walker (Mexico) Alfredo Ávila (Netherlands) Laurens Jan Anjema
Life Time Fitness Chicago Open; Vernon Hills, Chicago, United States; Men : Challenger 10; 16 players - $10,000	22–25 October	(Pakistan) Danish Atlas Khan; 11–7, 9–11, 11–7, 11–5	(Pakistan) Farhan Zaman	(Qatar) Abdulla Al-Tamimi (Egypt) Andrew Shoukry	(England) Ashley Davies (New Zealand) Evan Williams (Mexico) Arturo Salazar (England) Reuben Phillips
Sentara Martha Jefferson Hospital Open; Charlottesville, United States; Women : Challenger 10; 16 players - $10,000	22–25 October	(Egypt) Kanzy El Defrawy; 11–2, 12–1, 11–5	(Canada) Hollie Naughton	(Egypt) Amina Yousry (Egypt) Mayar Hany	(Wales) Deon Saffery (Canada) Nikki Todd (Pakistan) Maria Toorpakay (Colombia) Catalina Peláez
Mackay Open; Mackay, Australia; Men : Challenger 5; 32 players - $5,000 −−−−−− Women : Challenger 5; 16 players - $5,000	30 Oct.–1 Nov.	(Australia) Zac Alexander; 12–10, 11–8, 14–12	(Australia) Joshua Larkin	(England) Adam Murrills (Australia) Rhys Dowling	(Malaysia) Mithran Selvaratnam (Australia) Solayman Nowrozi (Australia) Rohan Toole (Australia) Darcy Evans
Mackay Open; Mackay, Australia; Men : Challenger 5; 32 players - $5,000 −−−−−− Women : Challenger 5; 16 players - $5,000	30 Oct.–1 Nov.	(Hong Kong) Vanessa Chu; 12–10, 11–8, 9–11, 11–6	(Australia) Sarah Cardwell	(Hong Kong) Tong Tsz Wing (Egypt) Nouran El Torky	(Malaysia) Zulhijjah Binti Azan (Netherlands) Milou van der Heijden (Hong Kong) Lee Ka Yi (Malaysia) Vanessa Raj
Cleveland Skating Club Open; Shaker Heights, United States; Men : Challenger 5; 16 players - $6,000	30 Oct.–1 Nov.	(Egypt) Andrew Shoukry; 11–2, 12–1, 11–5	(Republic of Ireland) Arthur Gaskin	(Netherlands) Sebastiaan Weenink (New Zealand) Evan Williams	(New Zealand) Ben Grindrod (South Africa) Thoboki Mohohlo (New Zealand) Chris van der Salm (England) Lyell Fuller
Qatar Classic; Doha, Qatar; Men : World Series; 32 players - $150,000 - Draw −−−−−− Women : World Series; 32 players - $115,000 - Draw	31 Oct.–6 Nov	(Egypt) Mohamed El Shorbagy; 11–5, 11–7, 5–11, 12–10	(France) Grégory Gaultier	(Egypt) Mazen Hesham (Australia) Ryan Cuskelly	(Egypt) Karim Abdel Gawad (Colombia) Miguel Ángel Rodríguez (Hong Kong) Max Lee (Egypt) Ali Farag
Qatar Classic; Doha, Qatar; Men : World Series; 32 players - $150,000 - Draw −−−−−− Women : World Series; 32 players - $115,000 - Draw	31 Oct.–6 Nov	(England) Laura Massaro; 11–8, 12–14, 11–9, 8–11, 11–9	(Egypt) Nour El Sherbini	(Malaysia) Nicol David (Egypt) Omneya Abdel Kawy	(India) Joshna Chinappa (France) Camille Serme (Egypt) Nouran Gohar (Hong Kong) Annie Au

==== November ====
Tournament	Date	Champion	Runner-Up	Semifinalists	Quarterfinalists
Life Time Fitness Minneapolis Open; Minneapolis, United States; Men : Challenger 10; 16 players - $10,000	5–8 November	(Mexico) Arturo Salazar; 9–11, 11–5, 11–4, 11–2	(Wales) Peter Creed	(South Africa) Clinton Leeuw (Netherlands) Sebastiaan Weenink	(England) Declan James (England) Charlie Johnson (South Africa) Thoboki Mohohlo (New Zealand) Evan Williams
GoodLife Open; Ottawa, Canada; Men : Challenger 10; 16 players - $10,000	5–8 November	(England) Tom Ford; 11–2, 11–6, 9–11, 11–8	(France) Geoffrey Demont	(Canada) Shawn Delierre (England) Anthony Graham	(England) Lyell Fuller (Guyana) Sunil Seth (British Virgin Islands) Joe Chapman (England) Joe Green
Queensland Open; Gold Coast, Australia; Men : Challenger 5; 32 players - $5,000 −−−−−− Women : Challenger 5; 16 players - $5,000	6–8 November	(Australia) Zac Alexander; 11–7, 11–5, 11–9	(Australia) Joshua Larkin	(Australia) Rhys Dowling (England) Adam Murrills	(Indonesia) Vivian Rhamanan (Australia) Thomas Calvert (Malaysia) Mithran Selvaratnam (Australia) Solayman Nowrozi
Queensland Open; Gold Coast, Australia; Men : Challenger 5; 32 players - $5,000 −−−−−− Women : Challenger 5; 16 players - $5,000	6–8 November	(Australia) Sarah Cardwell; 11–8, 10–12, 11–4, 11–9	(Australia) Lisa Camilleri	(Hong Kong) Tong Tsz Wing (South Africa) Cheyna Tucker	(New Zealand) Megan Craig (Australia) Samantha Foyle (Australia) Melissa Martin (Australia) Samantha Calvert
President Gold Cup; Islamabad, Pakistan; Men : International 25; 16 players - $25,000	7–10 November	(Pakistan) Nasir Iqbal; 11–9, 11–8, 11–5	(United States) Todd Harrity	(Egypt) Karim Ali Fathi (Egypt) Omar Abdel Meguid	(Pakistan) Farhan Mehboob (Pakistan) Danish Atlas Khan (Pakistan) Tayyab Aslam (Jordan) Ahmad Al-Saraj
Qatar Circuit No.1; Doha, Qatar; Men : Challenger 15; 16 players - $15,000	7–10 November	(Egypt) Mohammed Reda; 11–8, 8–11, 11–3, 12–10	(Germany) Jens Schoor	(Qatar) Abdulla Al-Tamimi (Kuwait) Ammar Al-Tamimi	(Egypt) Mazen Gamal (New Zealand) Lance Beddoes (Wales) Joel Makin (England) Nathan Lake
Monte Carlo Classic; Fontvieille, Monaco; Women : International 35; 16 players - $35,000	10–13 November	(England) Jenny Duncalf; 11–4, 13–11, 11–9	(England) Sarah-Jane Perry	(Australia) Rachael Grinham (Denmark) Line Hansen	(Guyana) Nicolette Fernandes (Wales) Tesni Evans (Netherlands) Natalie Grinham (England) Emily Whitlock
RC Pro Series; St. Louis, United States; Men : Challenger 15; 16 players - $15,000	11–14 November	(Scotland) Alan Clyne; 8–11, 11–1, 11–4, 10–12, 11–7	(Mexico) Arturo Salazar	(England) Tom Ford (England) Eddie Charlton	(Jamaica) Lewis Walters (Finland) Matias Tuomi (Argentina) Leandro Romiglio (United States) Chris Hanson
Malaysian Squash Tour VIII; Kuala Lumpur, Malaysia; Men : Challenger 5; 16 players - $5,000 −−−−−− Women : Challenger 5; 16 players - $5,000	11–14 November	(Hong Kong) Wong Chi Him; 11–7, 11–7, 11–8	(Malaysia) Mohd Syafiq Kamal	(England) Adam Murrills (Malaysia) Valentino Bong	(South Korea) Yoo Jae-jin (Malaysia) Addeen Idrakie (Malaysia) Bryan Lim Tze Kang (India) Ravi Dixit
Malaysian Squash Tour VIII; Kuala Lumpur, Malaysia; Men : Challenger 5; 16 players - $5,000 −−−−−− Women : Challenger 5; 16 players - $5,000	11–14 November	(Australia) Sarah Cardwell; 11–5, 11–5, 6–11, 11–3	(Malaysia) Teh Min Jie	(Malaysia) Vanessa Raj (Malaysia) Rachel Arnold	(Malaysia) Sivasangari Subramaniam (Malaysia) Aika Azman (Malaysia) Noor Shadira (Malaysia) Zulhijjah Binti Azan
Open International Niort-Venise Verte; Bessines, France; Men : Challenger 5; 16 players - $5,000	12–15 November	(France) Christophe André; 11–5, 11–9, 5–11, 8–11, 11–4	(Pakistan) Asim Khan	(Finland) Jaakko Vähämaa (France) Johan Bouquet	(Czech Republic) Jan Koukal (France) Auguste Dussourd (Spain) Hugo Varela (France) Baptiste Masotti
Madison Open; Madison, United States; Men : Challenger 5; 16 players - $5,000	12–15 November	(England) Angus Gillams; 11–5, 11–8, 11–0	(England) Anthony Graham	(Pakistan) Syed Hamzah Bukhari (Wales) Emyr Evans	(Cayman Islands) Cameron Stafford (Guatemala) Italo Bonatti (Scotland) Jon Geekie (England) Reuben Phillips
Mbair UK Bexley Open; Bexley, London, England; Men : Challenger 5; 16 players - $5,000	14–15 November	(England) Joshua Masters; 11–7, 11–9, 11–5	(Netherlands) Piëdro Schweertman	(South Africa) Tristan Eysele (England) Mark Fuller	(England) Ben Ford (England) Michael Harris (England) Bradley Masters (England) Chris Tomlinson
Malaysian Squash Tour IX; George Town, Malaysia; Men : Challenger 5; 16 players - $5,000 −−−−−− Women : Challenger 5; 16 players - $5,000	18–20 November	(Malaysia) Ivan Yuen; 11–7, 11–6, 11–9	(Malaysia) Sanjay Singh	(Malaysia) Addeen Idrakie (England) Adam Murrills	(Malaysia) Mohd Syafiq Kamal (Malaysia) Valentino Bong (India) Ravi Dixit (Australia) David Clegg
Malaysian Squash Tour IX; George Town, Malaysia; Men : Challenger 5; 16 players - $5,000 −−−−−− Women : Challenger 5; 16 players - $5,000	18–20 November	(Egypt) Nadine Shahin; 11–7, 11–6, 11–8	(Egypt) Amina Yousry	(Malaysia) Aifa Azman (Malaysia) Aika Azman	(Malaysia) Vanessa Raj (Malaysia) Sivasangari Subramaniam (Malaysia) Zulhijjah Binti Azan (Malaysia) Chan Yiwen
Sutton Coldfield International; Sutton Coldfield, England; Men : Challenger 5; 16 players - $5,000	18–21 November	(Belgium) Jan Van Den Herrewegen; 11–9, 11–6, 6–11, 6–11, 12–10	(England) Chris Fuller	(England) Patrick Rooney (England) Joshua Masters	(England) Michael Harris (England) Mark Fuller (South Africa) Tristan Eysele (England) Ben Ford
PSA Men's World Championship; Bellevue, United States; Men : PSA World Championship; 64 players - $325,000 - Draw	15–22 November	(France) Grégory Gaultier; 11–6, 11–7, 12–10	(Egypt) Omar Mosaad	(England) James Willstrop (Egypt) Tarek Momen	(England) Nick Matthew (Egypt) Ramy Ashour (Egypt) Ali Farag (Colombia) Miguel Ángel Rodríguez
Sunrise Foods Saskatoon Movember Boast; Saskatoon, Canada; Men : Challenger 10; 16 players - $10,000	19–22 November	(England) Tom Ford; 11–3, 11–5, 9–11, 12–14, 11–5	(Australia) Steven Finitsis	(Wales) Peter Creed (England) Charles Sharpes	(Canada) Nick Sachvie (Spain) Carlos Cornes (Mexico) Eric Gálvez (Canada) Andrew Schnell
Euro Styl Gdańsk Open; Kowale, Poland; Men : Challenger 5; 16 players - $5,000	20–22 November	(Netherlands) Piëdro Schweertman; 11–3, 11–9, 11–1	(France) Auguste Dussourd	(Czech Republic) Daniel Mekbib (Switzerland) Patrick Miescher	(Switzerland) Benjamin Fischer (Israel) Daniel Poleshchuk (Austria) Jakob Dirnberger (Finland) Miko Äijänen
ReidBuilt Homes Edmonton Open (Canada) Edmonton, Canada; International 35; 16 players - $35,000	25–28 November	(Egypt) Karim Abdel Gawad; 10–12, 11–6, 11–8, 11–9	(Egypt) Mohamed Abouelghar	(Mexico) César Salazar (Switzerland) Nicolas Müller	(Peru) Diego Elías (England) Chris Simpson (Netherlands) Laurens Jan Anjema (Mexico) Alfredo Ávila
Malaysian Squash Tour X Kuala Lumpur, Malaysia; Men : Challenger 5; 16 players - $5,000 −−−−−− Women : Challenger 5; 16 players - $5,000	25–28 November	(Malaysia) Addeen Idrakie; 9–11, 11–7, 11–8, 11–4	(Malaysia) Mohd Syafiq Kamal	(England) Adam Murrills (Malaysia) Valentino Bong	(Malaysia) Elvinn Keo (Malaysia) Sanjay Singh (Malaysia) Muhammad Hannan (India) Ravi Dixit
Malaysian Squash Tour X Kuala Lumpur, Malaysia; Men : Challenger 5; 16 players - $5,000 −−−−−− Women : Challenger 5; 16 players - $5,000	25–28 November	(Egypt) Nadine Shahin; 10–12, 12–10, 11–8, 11–7	(Malaysia) Sivasangari Subramaniam	(Malaysia) Teh Min Jie (Malaysia) Zulhijjah Binti Azan	(Malaysia) Aika Azman (France) Chloé Mesic (Malaysia) Rachel Arnold (Austria) Birgit Coufal
London Open; London, England; Men : Challenger 10; 16 players - $10,000 −−−−−− Women : Challenger 5; 16 players - $5,000	26–29 November	(New Zealand) Paul Coll; 11–9, 10–12, 12–10, 10–12, 11–7	(England) Ben Coleman	(England) Richie Fallows (England) George Parker	(Netherlands) Piëdro Schweertman (England) James Earles (England) Chris Fuller (England) Mark Fuller
London Open; London, England; Men : Challenger 10; 16 players - $10,000 −−−−−− Women : Challenger 5; 16 players - $5,000	26–29 November	(England) Millie Tomlinson; 11–9, 11–5, 11–3	(Belgium) Nele Gilis	(England) Georgina Kennedy (Colombia) Laura Tovar	(Egypt) Nada Abbas (Czech Republic) Anna Serme (Scotland) Alison Thomson (Belgium) Tinne Gilis

==== December ====
Tournament	Date	Champion	Runner-Up	Semifinalists	Quarterfinalists
MAA Invitational; Montreal, Canada; Men : Challenger 5; 16 players - $5,000	1–4 December	(England) Jaymie Haycocks; 11–9, 11–4, 11–4	(Canada) Michael McCue	(England) Ashley Davies (Canada) David Baillargeon	(Guyana) Sunil Seth (Colombia) Dairo Sandoval (Canada) Albert Shoihet (Trinidad and Tobago) Kale Wilson
PSA Valencia; Alboraya, Spain; Men : Challenger 10; 16 players - $10,000	2–5 December	(Germany) Jens Schoor; 11–3, 9–11, 12–10, 11–5	(Egypt) Mazen Gamal	(Netherlands) Piëdro Schweertman (Denmark) Kristian Frost	(England) George Parker (Spain) Iker Pajares (Spain) Carlos Cornes (France) Geoffrey Demont
Cathay Pacific/Sun Hung Kai Financial HK Open; Hong Kong, China; Men : World Series; 32 players - $150,000 - Draw −−−−−− Women : World Series; 32 players - $95,000 - Draw	1–6 December	(Egypt) Mohamed El Shorbagy; 11–6, 11–8, 11–6	(Australia) Cameron Pilley	(England) Nick Matthew (Egypt) Omar Mosaad	(Colombia) Miguel Ángel Rodríguez (Egypt) Tarek Momen (France) Grégory Gaultier (France) Mathieu Castagnet
Cathay Pacific/Sun Hung Kai Financial HK Open; Hong Kong, China; Men : World Series; 32 players - $150,000 - Draw −−−−−− Women : World Series; 32 players - $95,000 - Draw	1–6 December	(Malaysia) Nicol David; 15–13, 11–9, 11–3	(England) Laura Massaro	(Egypt) Raneem El Weleily (Egypt) Omneya Abdel Kawy	(Egypt) Nouran Gohar (United States) Amanda Sobhy (France) Camille Serme (New Zealand) Joelle King
Betty Griffin Memorial Florida Open; Boca Raton, United States; Men : Challenger 10; 16 players - $10,000	3–6 December	(India) Vikram Malhotra; 11–6, 11–8, 11–7	(Republic of Ireland) Arthur Gaskin	(Pakistan) Farhan Zaman (British Virgin Islands) Cameron Stafford	(Jamaica) Christopher Binnie (Guatemala) Josué Enríquez (England) Angus Gillams (England) Joe Green
Airport Xmas Challenger; Berlin, Germany; Men : Challenger 5; 16 players - $5,000	4–6 December	(Switzerland) Reiko Peter; 11–5, 11–6, 11–9	(Switzerland) Benjamin Fischer	(Egypt) Ahmed Hussein (Switzerland) Manuel Wanner	(Egypt) Tarek Shehata (Netherlands) Sebastiaan Weenink (Switzerland) Jonas Dähler (Finland) Jaakko Vähämaa
Malaysian Squash Tour XI; Kuala Lumpur, Malaysia; Men : Challenger 5; 16 players - $5,000 −−−−−− Women : Challenger 5; 16 players - $5,000	8–10 December	(England) Eddie Charlton; 11–9, 11–3, 11–3	(Malaysia) Valentino Bong	(England) Adam Murrills (Malaysia) Elvinn Keo	(Egypt) Youssef Ibrahim (Spain) Dani Pascual (Hong Kong) Tsun Hei Yuen (Hong Kong) Tang Ming Hong
Malaysian Squash Tour XI; Kuala Lumpur, Malaysia; Men : Challenger 5; 16 players - $5,000 −−−−−− Women : Challenger 5; 16 players - $5,000	8–10 December	(Malaysia) Rachel Arnold; 11–4, 10–12, 1–11, 11–9, 11–9	(Egypt) Menna Hamed	(Malaysia) Zulhijjah Binti Azan (Australia) Christine Nunn	(Malaysia) Teh Min Jie (Pakistan) Sadia Gul (Malaysia) Aifa Azman (Malaysia) Aika Azman
IMET PSA Open; Bratislava, Slovakia; Men : Challenger 5; 32 players - $5,000	11–13 December	(England) Chris Fuller; 11–13, 11–8, 11–7, 11–9	(Spain) Bernat Jaume	(France) Auguste Dussourd (Israel) Daniel Poleshchuk	(Czech Republic) Daniel Mekbib (Czech Republic) Martin Švec (Wales) Emyr Evans (Czech Republic) Ondřej Uherka
Pareti Squash Open; Kyiv, Ukraine; Men : Challenger 5; 16 players - $5,000	17–19 December	(France) Christophe André; 11–6, 11–7, 8–11, 11–6	(Wales) Joel Makin	(Israel) Daniel Poleshchuk (England) Julian Tomlinson	(Switzerland) Remo Handl (England) Miles Jenkins (Switzerland) Dimitri Steinmann (Italy) Stéphane Galifi
Qatar Circuit No.2; Doha, Qatar; Men : Challenger 15; 16 players - $15,000	20–23 December	(Egypt) Omar Abdel Meguid; 11–5, 11–6, 11–8	(Germany) Jens Schoor	(Malaysia) Ivan Yuen (Spain) Iker Pajares	(Kuwait) Abdullah Al-Muzayen (Pakistan) Danish Atlas Khan (New Zealand) Martin Knight (Egypt) Youssef Soliman

==== January ====
Tournament	Date	Champion	Runner-Up	Semifinalists	Quarterfinalists
Open du Gard; Nîmes, France; Men : Challenger 5; 16 players - $5,000	9–10 January	(France) Christophe André; 6–11, 11–5, 11–6, 4–11, 11–9	(England) Oliver Pett	(Portugal) Rui Soares (England) Robert Dadds	(France) Benjamin Aubert (France) Victor Crouin (Switzerland) Jonas Dähler (France) Auguste Dussourd
J.P. Morgan Tournament of Champions; New York City, United States; Men : World Series; 32 players - $150,000 - Draw −−−−−− Women : World Series; 32 players - $150,000 - Draw	7–14 January	(Egypt) Mohamed El Shorbagy; 8–11, 11–6, 11–8, 6–11, 11–6	(England) Nick Matthew	(France) Mathieu Castagnet (France) Grégory Gaultier	(Egypt) Marwan El Shorbagy (Germany) Simon Rösner (Egypt) Omar Mosaad (Spain) Borja Golán
J.P. Morgan Tournament of Champions; New York City, United States; Men : World Series; 32 players - $150,000 - Draw −−−−−− Women : World Series; 32 players - $150,000 - Draw	7–14 January	(Egypt) Nour El Sherbini; 11–4, 9–11, 12–10, 11–8	(United States) Amanda Sobhy	(Egypt) Nouran Gohar (Malaysia) Nicol David	(England) Laura Massaro (France) Camille Serme (Egypt) Omneya Abdel Kawy (England) Alison Waters
Sandman Hotels Penticton Open; Penticton, Canada; Men : Challenger 5; 16 players - $5,000	14–17 January	(England) Angus Gillams; 11–6, 11–6, 11–4	(England) Nathan Lake	(England) Adam Murrills (Mexico) Jesús Camacho	(Republic of Ireland) Brian Byrne (Mexico) Edgar Zayas (Mexico) Marco Toriz-Caddó (Canada) Albert Shoihet
Slaight Music & Roundtable Capital Granite Open; Toronto, Canada; Women : International 25; 16 players - $25,000	19–22 January	(England) Victoria Lust; 11–6, 11–2, 11–4	(Guyana) Nicolette Fernandes	(England) Fiona Moverley (India) Dipika Pallikal	(Wales) Deon Saffery (Mexico) Samantha Terán (United States) Olivia Blatchford (Egypt) Salma Hany
Holtrand Open; Medicine Hat, Canada; Men : Challenger 10; 16 players - $10,000	21–24 January	(England) Ben Coleman; 11–9, 13–11, 12–10	(Canada) Shawn Delierre	(England) Nathan Lake (Switzerland) Reiko Peter	(England) Angus Gillams (New Zealand) Martin Knight (Hong Kong) Chi-Him Wong (Canada) Andrew Schnell
Suez Helsinki Winter Challenger; Helsinki, Finland; Men : Challenger 5; 16 players - $5,000	22–24 January	(Australia) Matthew Hopkin; 9–11, 11–9, 11–7, 11–7	(France) Baptiste Masotti	(Finland) Kristian Rautiainen (England) Joshua Masters	(Pakistan) Asim Khan (Egypt) Shehab Essam (Austria) Aqeel Rehman (France) Geoffrey Demont
Liberty Bell Open; Berwyn, United States; Women : Challenger 5; 16 players - $5,000	22–24 January	(Canada) Danielle Letourneau; 13–15, 11–4, 11–8, 11–13, 11–9	(England) Georgina Stoker	(Mexico) Diana García (Brazil) Thaisa Serafini	(England) Millie Tomlinson (United States) Kelsey Engman (France) Cyrielle Peltier (Canada) Nicole Bunyan
Motor City Open; Bloomfield Hills, United States; Men : International 70; 16 players - $70,000 - Draw	22–25 January	(Egypt) Ali Farag; 11–7, 5–11, 11–6, 11–7	(England) Nick Matthew	(France) Mathieu Castagnet (Spain) Borja Golán	(Egypt) Mohamed El Shorbagy (Australia) Ryan Cuskelly (England) Chris Simpson (Hong Kong) Leo Au
Winnipeg Winter Club Open; Winnipeg, Canada; Women : Challenger 15; 16 players - $15,000	28–31 January	(England) Emily Whitlock; 11–8, 11–7, 11–4	(Guyana) Nicolette Fernandes	(England) Fiona Moverley (Canada) Hollie Naughton	(Canada) Danielle Letourneau (Egypt) Nouran El Torky (France) Cyrielle Peltier (Canada) Nikki Todd
Bankers Hall Club Pro-Am; Calgary, Canada; Men : Challenger 10; 16 players - $10,000	28–31 January	(Germany) Raphael Kandra; 11–5, 11–5, 11–9	(Canada) Shawn Delierre	(Mexico) Arturo Salazar (South Africa) Shaun Le Roux	(Mexico) Eric Gálvez (New Zealand) Martin Knight (England) Ben Coleman (Switzerland) Reiko Peter
Savcor Finnish Open; Mikkeli, Finland; Men : Challenger 5; 16 players - $5,000	28–31 January	(Egypt) Shehab Essam; 14–16, 3–11, 11–9, 11–9, 11–5	(France) Geoffrey Demont	(England) Ashley Davies (Israel) Daniel Poleshchuk	(Pakistan) Asim Khan (Finland) Jami Äijänen (Switzerland) Manuel Wanner (Finland) Miko Äijänen
Edinburgh Sports Club Open; Edinburgh, Scotland; Men : BSPA; 32 players - $9,999 −−−−−− Women : Challenger 5; 16 players - $5,000	29–31 January	(Scotland) Alan Clyne; 11–4, 11–5, rtd	(England) Tom Richards	(England) Daryl Selby (Scotland) Greg Lobban	(England) Richie Fallows (England) George Parker (England) Chris Ryder (England) Jaymie Haycocks
Edinburgh Sports Club Open; Edinburgh, Scotland; Men : BSPA; 32 players - $9,999 −−−−−− Women : Challenger 5; 16 players - $5,000	29–31 January	(England) Millie Tomlinson; 11–3, 11–7, 11–4	(Germany) Sina Kandra	(France) Chloé Mesic (Egypt) Nada Abbas	(England) Leonie Holt (India) Sachika Ingale (Spain) Xisela Aranda (Belgium) Tinne Gilis
Tub O' Towels Cleveland Classic; Pepper Pike, United States; Women : International 50; 16 players - $50,000 - Draw	30 Jan.–2 Feb.	(France) Camille Serme; 7–11, 11–6, 11–9, 11–5	(England) Alison Waters	(United States) Amanda Sobhy (England) Sarah-Jane Perry	(Hong Kong) Annie Au (India) Joshna Chinappa (United States) Olivia Blatchford (India) Dipika Pallikal

==== February ====
Tournament	Date	Champion	Runner-Up	Semifinalists	Quarterfinalists
Oregon Open; Portland, United States; Men : Challenger 15; 16 players - $15,000	3–6 February	(Egypt) Omar Abdel Meguid; 3–11, 11–5, 8–11, 11–5, 11–7	(Egypt) Karim Ali Fathy	(Germany) Raphael Kandra (India) Vikram Malhotra	(Qatar) Abdulla Al-Tamimi (Mexico) Arturo Salazar (United States) Todd Harrity (Mexico) Eric Gálvez
UCS Swedish Open; Linköping, Sweden; Men : International 70; 16 players - $70,000 - Draw	4–7 February	(Egypt) Karim Abdel Gawad; 12–10, 8–11, 11–9, 3–11, 11–4	(Egypt) Tarek Momen	(Germany) Simon Rösner (England) Daryl Selby	(England) Chris Simpson (Australia) Cameron Pilley (Hong Kong) Max Lee (France) Lucas Serme
CSC Delaware Open; Greenville, United States; Women : Challenger 10; 16 players - $10,000	4–7 February	(England) Fiona Moverley; 9–11, 11–8, 11–6, 11–4	(Canada) Nikki Todd	(South Africa) Siyoli Waters (Canada) Hollie Naughton	(Mexico) Diana García (South Africa) Cheyna Tucker (England) Georgina Kennedy (United States) Kelsey Engman
Ganem Vein Institute Cactus Classic; Phoenix, United States; Men : Challenger 15; 16 players - $16,000	10–14 February	(Egypt) Omar Abdel Meguid; 3–11, 11–5, 8–11, 11–5, 11–7	(United States) Todd Harrity	(Qatar) Abdulla Al-Tamimi (India) Mahesh Mangaonkar	(United States) Chris Hanson (Finland) Henrik Mustonen (Egypt) Karim Ali Fathy (Switzerland) Reiko Peter
Taeq SquashColombia Open; Cartagena, Colombia; Men : International 100; 16 players - $115,000 - Draw	16–20 February	(Egypt) Mohamed El Shorbagy; 11–9, 7–11, 11–3, 11–9	(Egypt) Omar Mosaad	(Egypt) Tarek Momen (Egypt) Marwan El Shorbagy	(Colombia) Miguel Á. Rodríguez (Australia) Cameron Pilley (England) Tom Richards (India) Saurav Ghosal
Guilfoyle Financial PSA Classic; Toronto, Canada; Men : Challenger 5; 16 players - $5,000	24–27 February	(New Zealand) Martin Knight; 11–9, 11–5, 11–5	(Israel) Daniel Poleshchuk	(Canada) Nick Sachvie (France) Geoffrey Demont	(England) Jaymie Haycocks (Canada) Michael McCue (Guyana) Sunny Seth (Canada) Matthew Serediak
Guggenheim Partners & Equitrust Windy City Open; Chicago, United States; Men : World Series; 32 players - $150,000 - Draw −−−−−− Women : World Series; 32 players - $150,000 - Draw	25 Feb.–2 Mar.	(Egypt) Mohamed El Shorbagy; 11–6, 11–3, 2–0 rtd	(England) Nick Matthew	(Egypt) Omar Mosaad (Colombia) Miguel Ángel Rodríguez	(France) Mathieu Castagnet (Germany) Simon Rösner (Egypt) Marwan El Shorbagy (Egypt) Tarek Momen
Guggenheim Partners & Equitrust Windy City Open; Chicago, United States; Men : World Series; 32 players - $150,000 - Draw −−−−−− Women : World Series; 32 players - $150,000 - Draw	25 Feb.–2 Mar.	(Egypt) Raneem El Weleily; 9–11, 11–6, 11–3, 11–6	(Egypt) Nour El Sherbini	(France) Camille Serme (England) Laura Massaro	(United States) Amanda Sobhy (Malaysia) Nicol David (Egypt) Nouran Gohar (Egypt) Omneya Abdel Kawy
Bahria Town Women's International; Rawalpindi, Pakistan; Women : Challenger 15; 16 players - $15,000	25–28 February	(Hong Kong) Liu Tsz Ling; 10–12, 12–10, 11–7, 11–6	(Egypt) Amina Yousry	(Pakistan) Maria Toorpakai (Hong Kong) Tong Tsz Wing	(Hong Kong) Lee Ka Yi (Egypt) Nouran El Torky (Hong Kong) Vanessa Chu (Egypt) Nadine Shahin
Persian Gulf Championship; Kish Island, Iran; Men : Challenger 5; 16 players - $6,000	25–28 February	(France) Baptiste Masotti; 15–13, 9–11, 12–10, 11–9	(Pakistan) Asim Khan	(Pakistan) Khawaja Adil Maqbool (Iraq) Mohamed Hassan	(Pakistan) Israr Ahmed (Iran) Mohammed Jafari (Qatar) Syed Azlan Amjad (Iran) Sami Ghasedabadi
Lew-Lapointe Discover MRU Open; Calgary, Canada; Men : Challenger 5; 16 players - $5,000	25–28 February	(Canada) Andrew Schnell; 11–8, 8–11, 11–2, 11–9	(France) Auguste Dussourd	(Mexico) Edgar Zayas (England) Reuben Phillips	(Mexico) Jesús Camacho (Pakistan) Shahjahan Khan (Brazil) Diego Gobbi (Bermuda) Micah Franklin

==== March ====
Tournament	Date	Champion	Runner-Up	Semifinalists	Quarterfinalists
Montréal Open; Montreal, Canada; Men : International 35; 16 players - $35,000	3–6 March	(Egypt) Ali Farag; 3–11, 18–16, 9–11, 11–6, 11–7	(Egypt) Karim Abdel Gawad	(England) Tom Richards (France) Grégoire Marche	(Malaysia) Nafiizwan Adnan (United States) Todd Harrity (Hong Kong) Tsz Fung Yip (Hong Kong) Leo Au
Samson Seattle Open; Seattle, United States; Men : Challenger 10; 16 players - $10,000 −−−−−− Women : Challenger 10; 16 players - $10,000	3–6 March	(Canada) Andrew Schnell; 11–7, 9–11, 11–7, 11–4	(India) Vikram Malhotra	(Pakistan) Shahjahan Khan (Finland) Matias Tuomi	(England) Tom Ford (England) Nathan Lake (Canada) Ismail Rauf (England) Ashley Davies
Samson Seattle Open; Seattle, United States; Men : Challenger 10; 16 players - $10,000 −−−−−− Women : Challenger 10; 16 players - $10,000	3–6 March	(Egypt) Mayar Hany; 11–8, 9–11, 11–9, 11–8	(Denmark) Line Hansen	(Australia) Sarah Cardwell (Australia) Christine Nunn	(Malaysia) Teh Min Jie (Malaysia) Vanessa Raj (Malaysia) Rachel Arnold (Netherlands) Milou van der Heijden
Life Time Atlanta Open; Sandy Springs, United States; Men : Challenger 10; 16 players - $10,000	3–6 March	(Qatar) Abdulla Al-Tamimi; 11–9, 4–11, 9–11, 11–9, 11–5	(United States) Chris Hanson	(Mexico) Eric Gálvez (South Africa) Clinton Leeuw	(India) Kush Kumar (Singapore) Vivian Rhamanan (England) Reuben Phillips (Israel) Daniel Poleshchuk
True Potential Northumbria Open; Newcastle, England; Men : Challenger 5; 16 players - $5,000	3–6 March	(England) George Parker; 11–5, 11–7, 7–11, 11–7	(England) Joe Green	(South Africa) Tristan Eysele (England) Ben Ford	(Scotland) Douglas Kempsell (England) Mike Harris (England) Nick Mulvey (Wales) Emyr Evans
Canary Wharf Classic; London, England; Men : International 70; 16 players - $70,000 - Draw	7–11 March	(France) Mathieu Castagnet; 6–11, 11–7, 11–8, 11–5	(Egypt) Omar Mosaad	(Spain) Borja Golán (Australia) Cameron Pilley	(England) Daryl Selby (Egypt) Fares Dessouky (England) James Willstrop (Germany) Simon Rösner
Sekisui Open; Kriens, Switzerland; Men : Challenger 15; 32 players - $15,000 −−−−−− Women : Challenger 5; 16 players - $5,000	9–13 March	(India) Mahesh Mangaonkar; 12–10, 7–11, 12–10, 11–13, 11–8	(Denmark) Kristian Frost	(Scotland) Greg Lobban (France) Geoffrey Demont	(Germany) Raphael Kandra (Australia) Joshua Larkin (South Africa) Tristan Eysele (Spain) Edmon López
Sekisui Open; Kriens, Switzerland; Men : Challenger 15; 32 players - $15,000 −−−−−− Women : Challenger 5; 16 players - $5,000	9–13 March	(South Africa) Alexandra Fuller; 11–8, 6–11, 11–4, 11–1	(France) Chloé Mesic	(Germany) Sina Kandra (Spain) Xisela Aranda	(Czech Republic) Anna Serme (France) Énora Villard (Austria) Birgit Coufal (Latvia) Ineta Mackeviča
Qualico Manitoba Open; Winnipeg, Canada; Men : Challenger 15; 16 players - $15,000	10–13 March	(New Zealand) Campbell Grayson; 11–6, 7–11, 11–7, 11–7	(England) Nathan Lake	(Egypt) Karim Ali Fathy (United States) Chris Hanson	(Canada) Shawn Delierre (Canada) Andrew Schnell (Mexico) Alfredo Ávila (United States) Chris Gordon
CFO Consulting Women's Squash Week; Calgary, Canada; Women : Challenger 15; 16 players - $15,000	10–13 March	(England) Emily Whitlock; 12–14, 14–12, 11–2, 11–6	(Australia) Christine Nunn	(Netherlands) Milou van der Heijden (Canada) Danielle Letourneau	(Australia) Sarah Cardwell (Malaysia) Rachel Arnold (India) Sachika Ingale (Malaysia) Teh Min Jie
The Wimbledon Club Squared Open; Wimbledon, London, England; Men : International 25; 16 players - $25,000	15–18 March	(England) James Willstrop; 11–8, 11–7, 8–11, 11–4	(Egypt) Omar Abdel Meguid	(England) Joshua Masters (England) Declan James	(England) George Parker (England) Charles Sharpes (England) Joe Lee (Australia) Matthew Hopkin
Inno Wood Open; Kriens, Switzerland; Men : Challenger 5; 16 players - $5,000	17–19 March	(Australia) Joshua Larkin; 11–7, 11–5, 7–11, 10–12, 11–9	(Hong Kong) Wong Chi Him	(Spain) Edmon López (Czech Republic) Daniel Mekbib	(Switzerland) Dimitri Steinmann (Switzerland) Manuel Wanner (Switzerland) Benjamin Fischer (Switzerland) Jonas Dähler
Qatar Circuit No.3; Doha, Qatar; Men : Challenger 15; 16 players - $15,000	20–23 March	(Qatar) Abdulla Al-Tamimi; 5–11, 11–4, 7–11, 11–6, 11–9	(Egypt) Karim Ali Fathy	(Malaysia) Ivan Yuen (Egypt) Mazen Gamal	(Egypt) Karim El Hammamy (Egypt) Mohamed Reda (Netherlands) Piëdro Schweertman (Kuwait) Ammar Al-Tamimi
Allam British Open; Hull, England; Men : World Series; 32 players - $150,000 - Draw −−−−−− Women : World Series; 32 players - $130,000 - Draw	21–27 March	(Egypt) Mohamed El Shorbagy; 11–2, 11–5, 11–9	(Egypt) Ramy Ashour	(France) Grégory Gaultier (Egypt) Karim Abdel Gawad	(Egypt) Marwan El Shorbagy (Egypt) Ali Farag (Colombia) Miguel Á. Rodríguez (Germany) Simon Rösner
Allam British Open; Hull, England; Men : World Series; 32 players - $150,000 - Draw −−−−−− Women : World Series; 32 players - $130,000 - Draw	21–27 March	(Egypt) Nour El Sherbini; 11–7, 9–11, 7–11, 11–6, 11–8	(Egypt) Nouran Gohar	(France) Camille Serme (Malaysia) Nicol David	(Egypt) Raneem El Weleily (Egypt) Omneya Abdel Kawy (United States) Amanda Sobhy (England) Laura Massaro
BCS Russian Open; Moscow, Russia; Men : Challenger 5; 16 players - $5,000	25–27 March	(France) Geoffrey Demont; 3–11, 6–11, 11–6, 11–2, 11–7	(Israel) Daniel Poleshchuk	(Netherlands) Sebastiaan Weenink (England) Chris Fuller	(Italy) Yuri Farneti (Finland) Jami Äijänen (England) Mark Fuller (Austria) Jakob Dirnberger
Malaysian Squash Tour I Malacca City, Malaysia; Men : Challenger 5; 16 players - $5,000 −−−−−− Women : Challenger 5; 16 players - $5,000	29–31 March	(India) Vikram Malhotra; 11–13, 9–11, 5–11	(Malaysia) Eain Yow	(Malaysia) Mohd Syafiq Kamal (New Zealand) Ben Grindrod	(South Korea) Ko Young-jo (Malaysia) Asyraf Azan (Hong Kong) Tsun Hei Yuen (Hong Kong) Chris Lo
Malaysian Squash Tour I Malacca City, Malaysia; Men : Challenger 5; 16 players - $5,000 −−−−−− Women : Challenger 5; 16 players - $5,000	29–31 March	(Malaysia) Sivasangari Subramaniam; 11–5, 11–4, 11–5	(Hong Kong) Ho Tze-Lok	(Malaysia) Aika Azman (Hong Kong) Vanessa Chu	(Hong Kong) Carmen Lee (Malaysia) Chan Yiwen (Malaysia) Aifa Azman (Malaysia) Zoe Foo Yuk Han
TRAC Oil & Gas North of Scotland Open; Aberdeen, Scotland; Men : Challenger 10; 16 players - $10,000	31 Mar.–3 Apr.	(Egypt) Youssef Soliman; 11–4, 11–4, 11–5	(Jamaica) Christopher Binnie	(India) Mahesh Mangaonkar (England) Eddie Charlton	(England) Joe Green (Australia) Steven Finitsis (Egypt) Karim Ali Fathy (England) Chris Fuller

==== April ====
Tournament	Date	Champion	Runner-Up	Semifinalists	Quarterfinalists
SVSL Sacramento Rubin Open; Gold River, United States; Men : Challenger 5; 16 players - $5,000	1–3 April	(Canada) Andrew Schnell; 11–5, 11–5, 11–5	(England) Charlie Johnson	(Belgium) Jan Van Den Herrewegen (United States) Faraz Khan	(South Africa) Thoboki Mohohlo (Mexico) Edgar Zayas (Mexico) Jorge Gómez (Mexico) Miled Zarazúa
Pilatus Cup; Kriens, Switzerland; Men : Challenger 5; 16 players - $5,000	6–8 April	(Switzerland) Reiko Peter; 11–4, 11–5, 11–7	(Australia) Joshua Larkin	(France) Victor Crouin (Switzerland) Benjamin Fischer	(Czech Republic) Martin Švec (Switzerland) Jonas Dähler (Switzerland) Dimitri Steinmann (Peru) Andrés Duany
Austrian Open; Salzburg, Austria; Men : Challenger 5; 16 players - $5,000	6–9 April	(England) Joshua Masters; 11–7, 11–5, 11–8	(Portugal) Rui Soares	(France) Baptiste Masotti (Netherlands) Sebastiaan Weenink	(France) Auguste Dussourd (Austria) Aqeel Rehman (Bermuda) Micah Franklin (Germany) Rudi Rohrmüller
Paderborn Open; Paderborn, Germany; Women : Challenger 5; 16 players - $5,000	7–9 April	(Belgium) Nele Gilis; 11–2, 11–2, 11–9	(Egypt) Nada Abbas	(France) Cyrielle Peltier (South Africa) Alexandra Fuller	(England) Rachael Chadwick (France) Énora Villard (Latvia) Ineta Mackeviča (Belgium) Tinne Gilis
JBM Patrol Spring Classic; Madison, United States; Men : Challenger 10; 16 players - $10,000	7–10 April	(England) Angus Gillams; 12–10, 11–9, 5–11, 11–8	(New Zealand) Martin Knight	(Pakistan) Danish Atlas Khan (Belgium) Jan Van Den Herrewegen	(South Africa) Thoboki Mohohlo (Wales) Peter Creed (Egypt) Karim Ali Fathy (England) Anthony Graham
6th PARCO Roshan Khan Open; Karachi, Pakistan; Men : Challenger 15; 16 players - $15,000	11–14 April	(Pakistan) Farhan Zaman; 11–9, 7–11, 8–11, 11–4	(Pakistan) Tayyab Aslam	(Pakistan) Khawaja Adil Maqbool (Pakistan) Shahjahan Khan	(Pakistan) Israr Ahmed (Pakistan) Asim Khan (Pakistan) Muhammad Farhan (Pakistan) Zahir Shah
Richmond Open; Richmond, United States; Women : Challenger 10; 16 players - $10,000	13–16 April	(Egypt) Kanzy El Defrawy; 11–7, 9–11, 11–2, 11–8	(Japan) Misaki Kobayashi	(Egypt) Hana Ramadan (Egypt) Nouran El Torky	(England) Georgina Stoker (England) Anna Kimberley (France) Marie Stephan (India) Sachika Balvani
Malaysian Squash Tour II; Kuala Lumpur, Malaysia; Men : Challenger 5; 16 players - $5,000 −−−−−− Women : Challenger 5; 16 players - $5,000	13–16 April	(Malaysia) Eain Yow; 6–11, 11–2, 11–7, 4–11, 11–7	(Malaysia) Elvinn Keo	(Jordan) Ahmad Al-Saraj (Malaysia) Addeen Idrakie	(Malaysia) Mohd Syafiq Kamal (Malaysia) Sanjay Singh (Malaysia) Valentino Bong (Spain) Bernat Jaume
Malaysian Squash Tour II; Kuala Lumpur, Malaysia; Men : Challenger 5; 16 players - $5,000 −−−−−− Women : Challenger 5; 16 players - $5,000	13–16 April	(Malaysia) Sivasangari Subramaniam; 9–11, 11–4, 11–7, 5–11, 11–1	(Australia) Lisa Camilleri	(Malaysia) Aifa Azman (Japan) Satomi Watanabe	(Norway) Lotte Eriksen (Malaysia) Andrea Lee (Malaysia) Aika Azman (Malaysia) Nazihah Hanis
Grasshopper Cup; Zürich, Switzerland; Men : International 70; 16 players - $70,000 - Draw	14–17 April	(Egypt) Marwan El Shorbagy; 6–11, 13–11, 11–9, 9–11, 11–6	(France) Grégory Gaultier	(Egypt) Ali Farag (Germany) Simon Rösner	(France) Grégoire Marche (England) Chris Simpson (Australia) Cameron Pilley (Switzerland) Nicolas Müller
Rochester ProAm; Rochester, United States; Men : Challenger 5; 16 players - $5,000	14–17 April	(New Zealand) Martin Knight; 11–3, 11–5, 11–5	(Belgium) Jan Van Den Herrewegen	(South Africa) Clinton Leeuw (Jamaica) Lewis Walters	(Mexico) Jesús Camacho (South Africa) Thoboki Mohohlo (United States) Faraz Khan (Guatemala) Josué Enríquez
Assore Central Gauteng Open; Randburg, Johannesburg, South Africa; Men : Challenger 5; 32 players - $5,000 −−−−−− Women : WSA Tour 5; 16 players - $5,000	18–22 April	(Argentina) Leandro Romiglio; 9–11, 11–4, 7–11, 11–4, 20–18	(Austria) Aqeel Rehman	(South Africa) Dylan Groenewald (Egypt) Shehab Essam	(South Africa) Jean-Pierre Brits (Egypt) Ahmed Effat Ashoush (France) Vincent Droesbeke (South Africa) Devon Hendrikse
Assore Central Gauteng Open; Randburg, Johannesburg, South Africa; Men : Challenger 5; 32 players - $5,000 −−−−−− Women : WSA Tour 5; 16 players - $5,000	18–22 April	(Egypt) Rowan Elaraby; 11–7, 11–5, 11–9	(South Africa) Milnay Louw	(South Africa) Elani Landman (South Africa) Lume Landman	(Nigeria) Yemisi Olatunji (South Africa) Cheyna Tucker (South Africa) Angie Clifton-Parks (South Africa) Makgosi Peloakgosi
Malaysian Squash Tour III; Kuala Lumpur, Malaysia; Men : Challenger 10; 16 players - $10,000 −−−−−− Women : Challenger 5; 16 players - $5,000	19–22 April	(Australia) Rex Hedrick; 11–4, 11–2, 11–2	(Netherlands) Piëdro Schweertman	(Malaysia) Elvinn Keo (Spain) Carlos Cornes	(Spain) Iker Pajares (Spain) Bernat Jaume (Malaysia) Eain Yow (Hong Kong) Wong Chi Him
Malaysian Squash Tour III; Kuala Lumpur, Malaysia; Men : Challenger 10; 16 players - $10,000 −−−−−− Women : Challenger 5; 16 players - $5,000	19–22 April	(Malaysia) Sivasangari Subramaniam; 11–7, 7–11, 12–10, 11–9	(Hong Kong) Vanessa Chu	(Malaysia) Zoe Foo Yuk Han (Japan) Satomi Watanabe	(Australia) Lakeesha Rarere (Norway) Lotte Eriksen (Malaysia) Teh Min Ern (Pakistan) Sadia Gul
GillenMarkets Irish Squash Open; Dublin, Republic of Ireland; Men : Challenger 15; 16 players - $15,000 −−−−−− Women : Challenger 5; 16 players - $6,000	20–23 April	(France) Lucas Serme; 11–9, 8–11, 11–6, 11–6	(England) Declan James	(New Zealand) Campbell Grayson (Netherlands) Laurens Jan Anjema	(England) Joe Lee (England) Charles Sharpes (India) Mahesh Mangaonkar (South Africa) Shaun Le Roux
GillenMarkets Irish Squash Open; Dublin, Republic of Ireland; Men : Challenger 15; 16 players - $15,000 −−−−−− Women : Challenger 5; 16 players - $6,000	20–23 April	(England) Millie Tomlinson; 11–4, 11–4, 11–3	(England) Rachael Chadwick	(Scotland) Alison Thomson (England) Georgina Kennedy	(Czech Republic) Anna Serme (Netherlands) Tessa ter Sluis (France) Énora Villard (Wales) Elin Harlow
Northern Ontario Open; Sudbury, Canada; Men : Challenger 10; 16 players - $10,000	20–23 April	(Mexico) Arturo Salazar; 11–5, 9–11, 11–4, 11–4	(Canada) Shahier Razik	(Canada) Nick Sachvie (Canada) Michael McCue	(Mexico) Eric Gálvez (Jamaica) Lewis Walters (New Zealand) Martin Knight (Bermuda) Noah Browne
El Gouna International; El Gouna, Egypt; Men : World Series; 32 players - $150,000 - Draw	24–29 April	(Egypt) Mohamed El Shorbagy; 7–11, 9–11, 11–3, 11–9, 11–8	(France) Grégory Gaultier	(Egypt) Fares Dessouky (Colombia) Miguel Á. Rodríguez	(Egypt) Marwan El Shorbagy (Egypt) Ali Farag (Egypt) Omar Mosaad (Germany) Simon Rösner
Keith Grainger Memorial UCT Open; Cape Town, South Africa; Men : Challenger 5; 32 players - $5,000 −−−−−− Women : Challenger 5; 16 players - $5,000	25–29 April	(Austria) Aqeel Rehman; 11–7, 11–6, 11–8	(Egypt) Hesham Aly	(Argentina) Leandro Romiglio (South Africa) Jean-Pierre Brits	(Egypt) Shehab Essam (South Africa) Rodney Durbach (South Africa) Christo Potgieter (England) Mark Broekman
Keith Grainger Memorial UCT Open; Cape Town, South Africa; Men : Challenger 5; 32 players - $5,000 −−−−−− Women : Challenger 5; 16 players - $5,000	25–29 April	(Egypt) Rowan Elaraby; 11–4, 11–7, 6–11, 11–9	(South Africa) Milnay Louw	(South Africa) Cheyna Tucker (South Africa) Elani Landman	(South Africa) Sacha West (South Africa) Lume Landman (Germany) Sina Kandra (Nigeria) Yemisi Olatunji
Naza PSA Women's World Championship; Kuala Lumpur, Malaysia; Women : World Championship; 32 players - $185,000 - Draw	25–30 April (Previously scheduled for 13–18; December 2015)	(Egypt) Nour El Sherbini; 6–11, 4–11, 11–3, 11–5, 11–8	(England) Laura Massaro	(Egypt) Raneem El Weleily (Egypt) Nouran Gohar	(France) Camille Serme (Malaysia) Nicol David (United States) Amanda Sobhy (Egypt) Omneya Abdel Kawy
Christchurch Vets Ipswich Open; Ipswich, England; Men : Challenger 5; 16 players - $5,000	28 Apr.–1 May	(Egypt) Youssef Soliman; 11–8, 4–11, 12–10, 8–11, 11–6	(England) Mark Fuller	(England) Patrick Rooney (Republic of Ireland) Sean Conroy	(Scotland) Douglas Kempsell (England) Kyle Finch (Australia) Matthew Hopkin (Republic of Ireland) Arthur Gaskin
Lviv Karakal Lion Cup; Lviv, Ukraine; Men : Challenger 5; 16 players - $5,000 −−−−−− Women : Challenger 5; 16 players - $5,000	28 Apr.–1 May	(France) Christophe André; 11–6, 11–5, 11–4	(Kuwait) Ammar Al-Tamimi	(Spain) Iker Pajares (Spain) Bernat Jaume	(Czech Republic) Martin Švec (Spain) Edmon López (Finland) Jaakko Vähämaa (Switzerland) Jonas Dähler
Lviv Karakal Lion Cup; Lviv, Ukraine; Men : Challenger 5; 16 players - $5,000 −−−−−− Women : Challenger 5; 16 players - $5,000	28 Apr.–1 May	(Egypt) Nada Abbas; 11–4, 11–7, 11–9	(Austria) Birgit Coufal	(Latvia) Ineta Mackeviča (France) Chloé Mesic	(Ukraine) Nadiya Usenko (France) Énora Villard (Switzerland) Marija Shpakova (Ukraine) Liana Sardak
Charlotte Open; Charlotte, United States; Men : Challenger 5; 16 players - $5,000	28 Apr.–1 May	(India) Vikram Malhotra; 11–8, 8–11, 11–7, 11–6	(Jamaica) Lewis Walters	(South Africa) Clinton Leeuw (Mexico) Jesús Camacho	(England) Anthony Graham (Spain) Hugo Varela (England) Reuben Phillips (Norway) Adrian Ostbye
Pak'nSave Devoy S&F Open; Tauranga, New Zealand; Men : Challenger 5; 16 players - $5,000	29 Apr.–1 May	(New Zealand) Evan Williams; 11–2, 11–5, 8–11, 11–7	(England) Adam Murrills	(New Zealand) Lance Beddoes (England) Joe Green	(New Zealand) Jamie Oakley (New Zealand) Ben Grindrod (Australia) Rhys Dowling (United States) Dylan Cunningham

==== May ====
Tournament	Date	Champion	Runner-Up	Semifinalists	Quarterfinalists
FMC International Squash Championship; Lahore, Pakistan; Men : Challenger 15; 16 players - $15,000	4–7 May	(Pakistan) Farhan Mehboob; 11–5, 11–3, 11–9	(Pakistan) Waqar Mehboob	(Pakistan) Amaad Fareed (Pakistan) Israr Ahmed	(Pakistan) Tayyab Aslam (Pakistan) Farhan Zaman (Pakistan) Faraz Muhammad (Pakistan) Raees Khan
Grand Sport 2nd Armenian Challenger; Yerevan, Armenia; Men : Challenger 5; 16 players - $5,000	5–8 May	(Egypt) Mazen Gamal; 11–8, 11–13, 12–10, 11–6	(England) Nathan Lake	(Italy) Stéphane Galifi (Finland) Jaakko Vähämaa	(France) Vincent Droesbeke (Egypt) Ahmed Hussein (Egypt) Khaled Labib (England) Alex Noakes
Waikato Open; Hamilton, New Zealand; Men : Challenger 5; 16 players - $5,000	6–8 May	(New Zealand) Evan Williams; 11–7, 6–11, 11–4, 15–13	(England) Adam Murrills	(New Zealand) Ben Grindrod (New Zealand) Luke Jones	(United States) Dylan Cunningham (England) Joe Green (South Korea) Yoo Seong-yeon (New Zealand) Zac Millar
4ème IG Open de Paris; Paris, France; Men : International 25; 16 players - $25,000	11–14 May	(England) Chris Simpson; 11–8, 11–8, 11–4	(England) Declan James	(Switzerland) Nicolas Müller (New Zealand) Paul Coll	(Scotland) Alan Clyne (England) Adrian Waller (Scotland) Greg Lobban (France) Lucas Serme
Jersey Squash Classic; Saint Clement, Jersey; Men : Challenger 5; 16 players - $5,000 −−−−−− Women : Challenger 5; 16 players - $5,000	11–14 May	(Egypt) Youssef Soliman; 11–6, 11–8, 11–9	(England) Mike Harris	(Portugal) Rui Soares (Australia) Matthew Hopkin	(Italy) Yuri Farneti (England) Nick Mulvey (Czech Republic) Ondřej Uherka (Scotland) Sam Ellis
Jersey Squash Classic; Saint Clement, Jersey; Men : Challenger 5; 16 players - $5,000 −−−−−− Women : Challenger 5; 16 players - $5,000	11–14 May	(England) Millie Tomlinson; 11–9, 11–5, 11–3	(Egypt) Hania El Hammamy	(South Africa) Alexandra Fuller (France) Laura Pomportes	(England) Georgina Kennedy (New Zealand) Ellie Epke (Switzerland) Nadia Pfister (England) Rachael Chadwick
Decker Camiones/Canal 10 Mar del Plata Open; Mar del Plata, Argentina; Men : Challenger 5; 16 players - $5,000	11–14 May	(Argentina) Robertino Pezzota; 11–9, 11–5, 6–11, 11–8	(Argentina) Leandro Romiglio	(Mexico) Juan Gómez Domínguez (Mexico) Edgar Zayas	(Colombia) Santiago Orozco (Argentina) Gonzalo Miranda (Mexico) Bryan Cueto (Brazil) Diego Gobbi
Seapiax Lorient Open; Larmor-Plage, France; Men : Challenger 5; 16 players - $5,000	12–14 May	(Spain) Carlos Cornes; 10–12, 11–8, 11–6, 12–10	(Spain) Iker Pajares	(Spain) Edmon López (France) Benjamin Aubert	(England) Taminder Gata-Aura (Israel) Roee Avraham (Canada) Michael McCue (Jamaica) Lewis Walters
Houston Open; Houston, United States; Men : International 50; 16 players - $50,000 - Draw	12–15 May	(Egypt) Marwan El Shorbagy; 11–7, 9–11, 11–9, 11–3	(Egypt) Mohamed Abouelghar	(Egypt) Mazen Hesham (Australia) Ryan Cuskelly	(Egypt) Omar Abdel Meguid (Egypt) Zahed Mohamed (South Africa) Stephen Coppinger (France) Grégoire Marche
NT Open; Darwin, Australia; Men : Challenger 5; 16 players - $5,000 −−−−−− Women : Challenger 5; 16 players - $5,000	13–15 May	(New Zealand) Zac Alexander; 11–2, 11–5, 8–11, 5–11, 11–5	(England) Adam Murrills	(Malaysia) Mithran Selvaratnam (Australia) Rhys Dowling	(Australia) Joseph White (Australia) Rohan Toole (Australia) Darcy Evans (Australia) David Clegg
NT Open; Darwin, Australia; Men : Challenger 5; 16 players - $5,000 −−−−−− Women : Challenger 5; 16 players - $5,000	13–15 May	(Republic of Ireland) Madeline Perry; 11–5, 11–3, 11–2	(Australia) Lisa Camilleri	(Australia) Samantha Foyle (Australia) Lakeesha Rarere	(Australia) Christine Nunn (Australia) Jessica Turnbull (Australia) Stephanie Wighton (Australia) Tamika Saxby
IX Torneo Internacional PSA Sporta; Santa Catarina Pinula, Guatemala; Men : International 50; 16 players - $50,000 - Draw	18–21 May	(Spain) Borja Golán; 11–8, 13–11, 11–4	(Mexico) César Salazar	(Egypt) Zahed Mohamed (Egypt) Mazen Hesham	(Mexico) Alfredo Ávila (South Africa) Stephen Coppinger (Egypt) Omar Abdel Meguid (Peru) Diego Elías
Flo.Money Stortford Classic; Bishop's Stortford, England; Men : Challenger 10; 16 players - $10,000	18–21 May	(England) Charles Sharpes; 11–8, 10–12, 11–7, 10–12, 11–5	(Wales) Joel Makin	(England) Richie Fallows (Wales) Peter Creed	(Republic of Ireland) Arthur Gaskin (Spain) Carlos Cornes (England) Jaymie Haycocks (England) Chris Fuller
Swiss IT-Factory Swiss Open; Schlieren, Switzerland; Men : Challenger 10; 16 players - $10,000	18–21 May	(Denmark) Kristian Frost; 3–11, 4–11, 11–5, 11–7, 11–4	(England) Joe Lee	(England) Tom Ford (Germany) Jens Schoor	(Australia) Joshua Larkin (Egypt) Saadeldin Abouaish (France) Baptiste Masotti (France) Benjamin Aubert
PSA Córdoba Open; Córdoba, Argentina; Men : Challenger 5; 16 players - $5,000	18–21 May	(Argentina) Robertino Pezzota; 11–7, 11–6, 11–8	(Mexico) Edgar Zayas	(Colombia) Dairo Sandoval (Mexico) Bryan Cueto	(Argentina) Hernán D'Arcangelo (Brazil) Diego Gobbi (Argentina) Leandro Romiglio (Colombia) Andrés Herrera
Raanana SC 30th Anniversary Festival; Ra'anana, Israel; Men : Challenger 5; 16 players - $5,000	19–22 May	(Austria) Aqeel Rehman; 11–9, 6–11, 9–11, 11–3	(Spain) Edmon López	(Spain) Iker Pajares (Spain) Bernat Jaume	(France) Auguste Dussourd (England) Julian Tomlinson (Israel) Roee Avraham (Israel) Nir Zisman
PSA World Series Finals; Dubai, United Arab Emirates; Men : World Series Finals; 8 players - $160,000 - Draw −−−−−− Women : World Series Finals; 8 players - $160,000 - Draw	24–28 May	(France) Grégory Gaultier; 11–4, 11–5, 8–11, 11–6	(Australia) Cameron Pilley	(Colombia) Miguel Á. Rodríguez (Egypt) Mohamed El Shorbagy	(France) Mathieu Castagnet (England) Nick Matthew (Egypt) Omar Mosaad (Germany) Simon Rösner
PSA World Series Finals; Dubai, United Arab Emirates; Men : World Series Finals; 8 players - $160,000 - Draw −−−−−− Women : World Series Finals; 8 players - $160,000 - Draw	24–28 May	(England) Laura Massaro; 9-11, 11–6, 5–11, 12–10, 11–5	(Egypt) Raneem El Weleily	(Malaysia) Nicol David (Egypt) Nour El Sherbini	(Egypt) Omneya Abdel Kawy (Egypt) Nouran Gohar (France) Camille Serme (United States) Amanda Sobhy
HKFC International; Hong Kong, China; Men : International 25; 16 players - $25,000 −−−−−− Women : International 25; 16 players - $25,000	25–28 May	(Malaysia) Nafiizwan Adnan; 11–6, 11–9, 11–8	(New Zealand) Paul Coll	(Malaysia) Ivan Yuen (Hong Kong) Leo Au	(Egypt) Mohamed Reda (Australia) Rex Hedrick (England) Adrian Waller (Egypt) Mazen Gamal
HKFC International; Hong Kong, China; Men : International 25; 16 players - $25,000 −−−−−− Women : International 25; 16 players - $25,000	25–28 May	(New Zealand) Joelle King; 11–9, 11–9, 9–11, 11–8	(India) Joshna Chinappa	(Hong Kong) Annie Au (Australia) Donna Urquhart	(Australia) Rachael Grinham (England) Jenny Duncalf (Malaysia) Delia Arnold (India) Dipika Pallikal
Regatas Resistencia Open; Resistencia, Argentina; Men : Challenger 10; 16 players - $10,000	25–28 May	(Mexico) Arturo Salazar; 11–8, 11–5, 11–9	(United States) Chris Gordon	(New Zealand) Martin Knight (Argentina) Leandro Romiglio	(Argentina) Robertino Pezzota (Paraguay) Nicolás Caballero (Switzerland) Jonas Dähler (Argentina) Federico Cioffi
Select Gaming Kent Open; Maidstone, England; Men : Challenger 10; 16 players - $10,000	26–29 May	(England) Tom Ford; 8–11, 12–10, 11–13, 11–5, 11–9	(Wales) Joel Makin	(Wales) Peter Creed (England) Charles Sharpes	(England) Jaymie Haycocks (England) Patrick Rooney (England) Richie Fallows (Australia) Matthew Hopkin
Grand Sport Armenian 1st Challenger; Yerevan, Armenia; Women : Challenger 5; 16 players - $5,000	26–29 May	(Egypt) Hana Moataz; 12–10, 7–11, 11–9, 12–10	(Netherlands) Milou van der Heijden	(France) Énora Villard (Latvia) Ineta Mackeviča	(France) Laura Pomportes (Wales) Jennifer Haley (Norway) Lotte Eriksen (Russia) Ekaterina Marusan
City of Perth Squash Challenge; Perth, Australia; Men : Challenger 5; 16 players - $5,000 −−−−−− Women : Challenger 5; 16 players - $5,000	27–29 May	(Australia) Zac Alexander; 14–12, 11–5, 11–8	(Jamaica) Lewis Walters	(Australia) Rhys Dowling (England) Adam Murrills	(South Korea) Ko Young-jo (Australia) Timothy Cornish (Australia) Thomas Calvert (Australia) David Ilich
City of Perth Squash Challenge; Perth, Australia; Men : Challenger 5; 16 players - $5,000 −−−−−− Women : Challenger 5; 16 players - $5,000	27–29 May	(Australia) Tamika Saxby; 11–9, 9–11, 11–9, 8–11, 11–5	(Australia) Sarah Cardwell	(Australia) Samantha Foyle (Australia) Lisa Camilleri	(Australia) Jessica Turnbull (Australia) Samantha Calvert (Australia) Amanda Hopps (Australia) Stephanie Wighton
Arab Federation Open; Tanta, Egypt; Men : Challenger 10; 32 players - $10,000	30 May–3 Jun.	(Egypt) Shehab Essam; 11–9, 9–11, 9–11, 11–8, 11–9	(Egypt) Karim El Hammamy	(Egypt) Mohamed Reda (Egypt) Mazen Gamal	(Pakistan) Asim Khan (Jordan) Ahmad Al-Saraj (Egypt) Moustafa Montaser (Egypt) Saadeldin Abouaish

==== June ====
Tournament	Date	Champion	Runner-Up	Semifinalists	Quarterfinalists
Paraguay Open; Asunción, Paraguay; Men : Challenger 10; 16 players - $10,000	1–4 June	Arturo Salazar; 11–5, 11–5, 11–8	(Argentina) Robertino Pezzota	(Mexico) Edgar Zayas (Mexico) Eric Gálvez	(United States) Chris Gordon (Jamaica) Christopher Binnie (Mexico) Juan Gómez Domínguez (New Zealand) Martin Knight
Open International d'Angers; Angers, France; Men : Challenger 5; 16 players - $5,000	1–4 June	(England) Angus Gillams; 9–11, 12–10, 11–7, 11–7	(Spain) Carlos Cornes	(France) Fabien Verseille (France) Vincent Droesbeke	(France) Baptiste Masotti (France) Auguste Dussourd (France) Yann Perrin (England) Robert Downer
IJM Land 4th Penang Women's Open; George Town, Malaysia; Women : Challenger 5; 16 players - $5,000	1–4 June	(Hong Kong) Tong Tsz Wing; 7–11, 11–7, 12–10, 10–12, 11–3	(Malaysia) Rachel Arnold	(Malaysia) Vanessa Raj (Hong Kong) Lee Ka Yi	(Malaysia) Aika Azman (Hong Kong) Ho Tze-Lok (Japan) Satomi Watanabe (Malaysia) Nazihah Hanis
Prague Open; Prague, Czech Republic; Men : Challenger 5; 16 players - $5,000	3–5 June	(Spain) Iker Pajares; 11–8, 11–9, 8–11, 11–6	(Czech Republic) Jan Koukal	(Wales) Joel Makin (Czech Republic) Petr Martin	(Czech Republic) Martin Švec (Netherlands) Sebastiaan Weenink (Czech Republic) Daniel Mekbib (England) Richard Williams
Harrow Ukrainian Squash Cup I Kyiv, Ukraine; Women : Challenger 5; 16 players - $5,000	3–5 June	(England) Millie Tomlinson; 11–5, 11–5, 11–7	(Czech Republic) Anna Serme	(Canada) Nikki Todd (Belgium) Tinne Gilis	(Austria) Birgit Coufal (Egypt) Hana Moataz (France) Énora Villard (Ukraine) Nadiya Usenko
City of Kalgoorlie & Boulder Golden Open; Kalgoorlie, Australia; Men : Challenger 5; 16 players - $5,000	4–6 June	(Australia) Mike Corren; 11–8, 11–9, 11–7	(South Korea) Ko Young-jo	(England) Adam Murrills (Australia) Rhys Dowling	(Australia) Solayman Nowrozi (Hong Kong) Chris Lo (South Korea) Park Jong-myoung (Hong Kong) Alex Lau
Fitzherbert Rowe Lawyers NZ Classic; Palmerston North, New Zealand; Men : Challenger 15; 16 players - $15,000	9–12 June	(New Zealand) Paul Coll; 11–5, 11–7, 11–1	(Australia) Rex Hedrick	(England) Joshua Masters (Malaysia) Ivan Yuen	(England) Angus Gillams (Malaysia) Eain Yow (Wales) Peter Creed (Taiwan) James Huang
Buenos Aires Tortugas Open; Manuel Alberti, Argentina; Men : Challenger 5; 16 players - $5,000	9–12 June	(Argentina) Leandro Romiglio; 11–5, 13–11, 11–13, 11–5	(Argentina) Robertino Pezzota	(Argentina) Gonzalo Miranda (Brazil) Diego Gobbi	(Peru) Alonso Escudero (Argentina) Ignacio Gutiérrez Keen (Argentina) Federico Cioffi (Argentina) Rodrigo Obregón
Madeira Island Open; Caniço, Portugal; Men : Challenger 5; 16 players - $5,000	10–12 June	(England) Patrick Rooney; 6–11, 11–9, 11–8, 11–6	(Spain) Edmon López	(Egypt) Shehab Essam (England) James Peach	(Portugal) Cláudio Pinto (England) Adam Auckland (Wales) Emyr Evans (England) Luke Parker
Squashways Christchurch Open; Christchurch, New Zealand; Men : Challenger 10; 16 players - $10,000	16–19 June	(New Zealand) Paul Coll; 11–7, 11–2, 11–5	(England) Angus Gillams	(England) Joshua Masters (Wales) Peter Creed	(Australia) Joshua Larkin (Malaysia) Ivan Yuen (New Zealand) Lance Beddoes (Taiwan) James Huang
Sandgate Open; Sandgate, Australia; Women : Challenger 5; 16 players - $5,000	17–19 June	(Australia) Tamika Saxby; 11–8, 11–5, 4–11, 11–1	(Australia) Lisa Camilleri	(Australia) Jessica Turnbull (Australia) Samantha Foyle	(New Zealand) Emma Millar (Australia) Lakeesha Rarere (Australia) Stephanie Wighton (Australia) Sarah Cardwell
British Virgin Islands Open; Road Town, British Virgin Islands; Men : Challenger 5; 16 players - $5,000	23–25 June	(Mexico) Jesús Camacho; 12–10, 1–11, 11–3, 11–8	(England) Adam Murrills	(Cayman Islands) Cameron Stafford (British Virgin Islands) Joe Chapman	(Mexico) Leonel Cárdenas (Guatemala) Italo Bonatti (Trinidad and Tobago) Kale Wilson (Guatemala) Mauricio Sedano
Gibraltar Open; Gibraltar; Men : Challenger 5; 16 players - $5,000	24–25 June	(Czech Republic) Jan Koukal; 11–8, 11–4, 11–8	(Portugal) Cláudio Pinto	(Spain) Dani Pascual (England) Mark Fuller	(Belgium) Jan Van Den Herrewegen (South Africa) Tristan Eysele (Portugal) Rui Soares (France) Vincent Droesbeke
ILT-Community Trust NZ Southern Open; Invercargill, New Zealand; Men : Challenger 15; 16 players - $15,000	23–26 June	(New Zealand) Paul Coll; 11–6, 11–3, 13–15, 11–8	(Hong Kong) Yip Tsz Fung	(England) Angus Gillams (Australia) Rex Hedrick	(Taiwan) James Huang (Australia) Joshua Larkin (Wales) Peter Creed (England) Joshua Masters
BTMI Barbados Open; Hastings, Barbados; Men : Challenger 5; 16 players - $5,000	30 Jun.–2 Jul.	(England) Joe Green; 11–9, 10–12, 11–9, 11–6	(Bermuda) Micah Franklin	(Mexico) Fernando Magdaleno (England) Laurence Green	(Jamaica) Julian Morrison (Cayman Islands) Cameron Stafford (Guatemala) Antonio de la Torre (England) Lewis Doughty

==== July ====
Tournament	Date	Champion	Runner-Up	Semifinalists	Quarterfinalists
Fujitsu NSW Open; Elanora Heights, Australia; Men : Challenger 5; 16 players - $5,000 −−−−−− Women : Challenger 5; 16 players - $5,000	1–3 July	(Australia) Zac Alexander; 11–6, 11–7, 11–9	(Australia) Aaron Frankcomb	(Australia) Matthew Karwalski (Australia) Rhys Dowling	(Switzerland) Luca Wilhelmi (Australia) Solayman Nowrozi (India) Sandeep Ramachandran (Australia) Iain Tennant
Fujitsu NSW Open; Elanora Heights, Australia; Men : Challenger 5; 16 players - $5,000 −−−−−− Women : Challenger 5; 16 players - $5,000	1–3 July	(Australia) Tamika Saxby; 11–3, 11–5, 11–8	(Australia) Lisa Camilleri	(New Zealand) Emma Millar (Norway) Lotte Eriksen	(New Zealand) Danielle Fourie (Hong Kong) Ho Tze-Lok (Australia) Lakeesha Rarere (Hong Kong) Lee Ka Yi
Contrex Challenge Cup; Hong Kong, China; Men : Challenger 5; 16 players - $5,000 −−−−−− Women : Challenger 5; 16 players - $5,000	6–9 July	(Hong Kong) Wong Chi Him; 11–8, 11–3, 11–5	(Hong Kong) Tang Ming Hong	(Hong Kong) Yeung Ho Wai (Hong Kong) Alex Lau	(Hong Kong) Henry Leung (Malaysia) Mohd Farez Izwan (Hong Kong) Tsun Hei Yuen (Malaysia) Bryan Lim Tze Kang
Contrex Challenge Cup; Hong Kong, China; Men : Challenger 5; 16 players - $5,000 −−−−−− Women : Challenger 5; 16 players - $5,000	6–9 July	(Malaysia) Andrea Lee; 11–9, 13–11, 11–6	(Hong Kong) Lee Ka Yi	(Hong Kong) Bubble Lui (Malaysia) Zoe Foo Yuk Han	(Malaysia) Sivasangari Subramaniam (Hong Kong) Ho Tze-Lok (Hong Kong) Elise Ng (Hong Kong) Cheng Nga Ching
City Of Devonport Tasmanian Open; Devonport, Australia; Men : Challenger 5; 16 players - $5,000 −−−−−− Women : Challenger 5; 16 players - $5,000	8–10 July	(Australia) Zac Alexander; 11–8, 11–1, 11–4	(South Korea) Ko Young-jo	(India) Sandeep Ramachandran (Australia) Thomas Calvert	(South Korea) Woo Chang-wook (Australia) Rhys Dowling (England) Elliot Selby (Australia) Darcy Evans
City Of Devonport Tasmanian Open; Devonport, Australia; Men : Challenger 5; 16 players - $5,000 −−−−−− Women : Challenger 5; 16 players - $5,000	8–10 July	(Hong Kong) Tong Tsz Wing; 2–11, 11–5, 15–13, 13–11	(Hong Kong) Vanessa Chu	(Australia) Lisa Camilleri (Australia) Jessica Turnbull	(New Zealand) Emma Millar (Australia) Lakeesha Rarere (Australia) Selena Shaikh (Norway) Lotte Eriksen
Harrow Ukrainian Squash Cup II; Kyiv, Ukraine; Women : Challenger 5; 16 players - $5,000	8–10 July	(England) Millie Tomlinson; 14–12, 9–11, 11–1, 12–10	(Egypt) Zeina Mickawy	(Egypt) Hana Moataz (Ukraine) Nadiya Usenko	(Japan) Misaki Kobayashi (Switzerland) Nadia Pfister (France) Marie Stephan (Iran) Arezou Mousavi
South Australian Open; Campbelltown, Australia; Men : Challenger 5; 16 players - $5,000 −−−−−− Women : Challenger 5; 16 players - $5,000	13–16 July	(France) Vincent Droesbeke; 9–11, 11–6, 10–12, 11–2, 11–4	(South Korea) Ko Young-jo	(Australia) Mike Corren (Australia) Rhys Dowling	(India) Sandeep Ramachandran (Switzerland) Luca Wilhelmi (England) Elliot Selby (South Korea) Park Jong-myoung
South Australian Open; Campbelltown, Australia; Men : Challenger 5; 16 players - $5,000 −−−−−− Women : Challenger 5; 16 players - $5,000	13–16 July	(Australia) Tamika Saxby; 12–10, 10–12, 11–7, 12–10	(Hong Kong) Tong Tsz Wing	(Hong Kong) Vanessa Chu (Australia) Lisa Camilleri	(Australia) Selena Shaikh (South Korea) Choe Yu-ra (Australia) Jasmine Chan (Australia) Lakeesha Rarere
Silesia Katowice PSA Open; Katowice, Poland; Men : Challenger 5; 16 players - $5,000	22–24 July	(Netherlands) Piëdro Schweertman; 11–13, 9–11, 11–6, 11–4, 11–9	(England) Charlie Lee	(Australia) Matthew Hopkin (England) Mark Fuller	(England) Kyle Finch (Republic of Ireland) Sean Conroy (France) Victor Crouin (England) Matthew Broadberry
City of Greater Bendigo International; Bendigo, Australia; Men : Challenger 5; 32 players - $5,000 −−−−−− Women : Challenger 5; 16 players - $5,000	28–31 July	(New Zealand) Evan Williams; 11–7, 11–7, 1–11, 2–11, 11–5	(Switzerland) Dimitri Steinmann	(France) Vincent Droesbeke (Malaysia) Elvinn Keo	(Malaysia) Mithran Selvaratnam (Egypt) Mohamed Saied (Switzerland) Patrick Miescher (India) Sandeep Ramachandran
City of Greater Bendigo International; Bendigo, Australia; Men : Challenger 5; 32 players - $5,000 −−−−−− Women : Challenger 5; 16 players - $5,000	28–31 July	(Egypt) Hana Ramadan; 11–6, 11–4, 9–11, 11–9	(Australia) Jessica Turnbull	(Egypt) Nouran El Torky (South Korea) Choe Yu-ra	(England) Millie Tomlinson (South Africa) Siyoli Waters (India) Sachika Ingale (Australia) Stephanie Wighton

== Year end world top 10 players ==
=== Men's world ranking ===
Rank	2015	
1	Grégory Gaultier (FRA)	1,554.500
2	Mohamed El Shorbagy (EGY)	1,456.000
3	Nick Matthew (ENG)	1,278.000
4	Omar Mosaad (EGY)	783.500
5	Miguel Ángel Rodríguez (COL)	709.500
6	Ramy Ashour (EGY)	575.000
7	Simon Rösner (GER)	525.500
8	Karim Abdel Gawad (EGY)	489.500
9	Mathieu Castagnet (FRA)	471.500
10	Tarek Momen (EGY)	460.500

=== Women's world ranking ===
Rank	2015	
1	Raneem El Weleily (EGY)	2,831.765
2	Laura Massaro (ENG)	2,553.529
3	Nicol David (MAS)	2,396.250
4	Camille Serme (FRA)	1,784.375
5	Omneya Abdel Kawy (EGY)	1,462.500
6	Nour El Sherbini (EGY)	1,430.000
7	Nour El Tayeb (EGY)	1,340.625
8	Alison Waters (ENG)	1,175.625
9	Nouran Gohar (EGY)	827.059
10	Annie Au (HKG)	815.789

== Retirements ==
Following is a list of notable players (winners of a main tour title, and/or part of the PSA Men's World Rankings and Women's World Rankings top 30 for at least one month) who announced their retirement from professional squash, became inactive, or were permanently banned from playing, during the 2015 season:

- Amr Shabana (born 29 July 1979 in the Cairo, Egypt) joined the pro tour in 1995, reached the world no. 1 ranking in April 2006. Keeping the spot for 33 months between 2006 and 2008. He won four World Open Squash Championship titles in 2003, 2005, 2007 and 2009. The Egyptian also has won 33 PSA World Tour titles including four Hong Kong Open titles in 2006, 2007, 2008 and 2009, two titles of the US Open, 3 titles of the Tournament of Champions in New York or two Qatar Classic titles in 2006 and 2007. He retired in September after past more than ten years in the top 10 PSA World Ranking.
- (Republic of Ireland) Madeline Perry (born 11 February 1977 in Banbridge, Northern Ireland) joined the pro tour in 1998, reached the world no. 3 ranking in April 2011. She reached the final of the British Open in 2009 against Rachael Grinham and the final of the Qatar Classic in 2011 against Nicol David. She also has won 11 PSA World Tour titles including the Australian Open and the Irish Squash Open. She retired in April 2015 after competing a last time the Irish Squash Open in Dublin.
- Peter Barker (born 26 September 1983 in London, England) joined the pro tour in 2002, reached the singles no. 5 spot in 2012. He won 16 PSA World Tour titles including four times the Colombian Open in 2005, 2006, 2007 and 2013, the Kuala Lumpur Open in 2009 and the Malaysian Open in 2013. He reached the semi-finals of the World Championship in 2010 and two times the semi-finals of the prestigious British Open in 2009 and 2012. He retired in December after competing a last time in the Hong Kong Open.
- Ong Beng Hee (born 4 February 1980 in Penang, Malaysia) joined the pro tour in 1995, reached the singles no. 7 spot in 2001. Gold medallist of the Asian Games in 2002 and 2006, he won 15 PSA World Tour titles including three times the Malaysian Open in 2000, 2005 and 2008, the Kuala Lumpur Open in 2008, the Macau Open and the Swedish Open. He retired in July after competing a last time in the El Gouna International in Egypt.

== See also ==
- Professional Squash Association (PSA)
- 2015 PSA World Series
- Men's World Rankings
- Women's World Rankings
- 2015–16 PSA World Series
- PSA World Series Finals
- PSA World Open
- 2015 Men's World Team Squash Championships
