= 2017–18 PSA World Tour =

Details
- Event name: 2017–18 PSA World Tour
- Dates: August 2017–July 2018
- Categories: World Championship: Men's/Women's; World Series 17–18; World Series Finals: Men's/Women's; PSA 5/10/15/25/35/50/70/100
- Website; PSA World Tour

Achievements
- World Number 1: Men : (France) Grégory Gaultier; Women : (Egypt) Nour El Sherbini
- World Champion: Men : (Egypt) Mohamed El Shorbagy; Women : (Egypt) Raneem El Weleily

The 2017–18 PSA World Tour is the international squash tour organised circuit organized by the Professional Squash Association (PSA) for the 2017 squash season. It's the 3rd PSA season since the merger of PSA and WSA associations in 2015.

The most important tournaments in the series are the Men's and Women's PSA World Championship. The tour also features three categories of regular events - PSA World Series, which feature the highest prize money and the best fields; PSA 25-100 (formerly International) and PSA 5-15 (formerly Challenger). In the middle of the year, the PSA World Series tour is concluded by the Men's and Women's PSA World Series Finals in Dubai, the World Series-ending championships for the top 8 rated players. Players' performances in the tour are rated by World Rankings for men and women.

== Calendar ==
=== Key ===
World Championship
World Series
PSA 100
PSA 70
PSA 50
PSA 25/35
PSA 5/10/15

=== August ===
| Tournament | Date | Champion | Runner-Up | Semifinalists | Quarterfinalists |
|---|---|---|---|---|---|
| City of Greater Bendigo International; Bendigo, Australia; Men : PSA 5; 32 players - $5,000 −−−−−− Women : PSA 5; 16 players - $5,000 | 17–20 August | (Australia) Joshua Larkin; 11–2, 11–7, 11–4 (5th PSA title) | (Japan) Ryunosuke Tsukue | (Spain) Bernat Jaume (Belgium) Joeri Hapers | (Hong Kong) Tang Ming Hong (Hong Kong) Henry Leung (Australia) Rhys Dowling (Hong Kong) Alex Lau |
| City of Greater Bendigo International; Bendigo, Australia; Men : PSA 5; 32 players - $5,000 −−−−−− Women : PSA 5; 16 players - $5,000 | 17–20 August | (Hong Kong) Ho Tze-Lok; 11–5, 4–11, 11–2, 12–10 (3rd PSA title) | (Hong Kong) Liu Tsz Ling | (Australia) Samantha Foyle (Australia) Christine Nunn | (Australia) Jessica Turnbull (Australia) Taylor Flavell (Australia) Stephanie Wighton (Australia) Moana Gray |
| Dalian Squash Association China Grand Prix; Dalian, China; Women : PSA 5; 16 players - $5,000 | 24–27 August | (Egypt) Hana Ramadan; 6–11, 8–11, 11–6, 11–6, 11–9 (4th PSA title) | (Japan) Satomi Watanabe | (Japan) Risa Sugimoto (China) Li Dongjin | (India) Janet Vidhi (China) He Xinru (Iran) Arezoo Mousavizadeh (China) Duan Siyu |
| City of Greater Shepparton International; Shepparton, Australia; Men : PSA 5; 32 players - $5,000 | 24–27 August | (Australia) Joshua Larkin; 8–11, 11–3, 4–11, 11–3, 12–10 (6th PSA title) | (Spain) Bernat Jaume | (Australia) Rhys Dowling (New Zealand) Evan Williams | (South Korea) Ko Young-jo (New Zealand) Sion Wiggin (Hong Kong) Chris Lo (Qatar) Syed Azlan Amjad |
| Remeo Helsinki Summer Challenger; Helsinki, Finland; Men : PSA 5; 16 players - $5,000 | 25–27 August | (France) Baptiste Masotti; 11–9, 11–7, 11–7 (2nd PSA title) | (Denmark) Kristian Frost | (Belgium) Jan Van Den Herrewegen (Finland) Miko Äijänen | (Egypt) Shehab Essam (Finland) Jami Äijänen (England) Mark Fuller (United States) Spencer Lovejoy |
| J.P. Morgan China Squash Open; Shanghai, China; Men : PSA 100; 16 players - $100,000 - Draw −−−−−− Women : PSA 100; 16 players - $100,000 - Draw | 31 Aug.–3 Sep. | (Egypt) Ramy Ashour; 11–3, 11–8, 10–12, 2–11, 11–5 (39th PSA title) | (Egypt) Ali Farag | (New Zealand) Paul Coll (Egypt) Marwan El Shorbagy | (Peru) Diego Elías (Germany) Simon Rösner (England) Daryl Selby (Egypt) Fares Dessouky |
| J.P. Morgan China Squash Open; Shanghai, China; Men : PSA 100; 16 players - $100,000 - Draw −−−−−− Women : PSA 100; 16 players - $100,000 - Draw | 31 Aug.–3 Sep. | (Egypt) Nour El Sherbini; 12–10, 11–7, 11–9 (11th PSA title) | (Egypt) Nouran Gohar | (France) Camille Serme (New Zealand) Joelle King | (Malaysia) Nicol David (England) Alison Waters (Hong Kong) Annie Au (Egypt) Nour El Tayeb |
| Tarra Volkswagen Bega Open; Bega, Australia; Men : PSA 5; 16 players - $5,000 | 31 Aug.–3 Sep. | (Switzerland) Dimitri Steinmann; 11–7, 11–8, 11–4 (1st PSA title) | (Australia) Joshua Larkin | (Australia) Rhys Dowling (New Zealand) Ben Grindrod | (Belgium) Joeri Hapers (New Zealand) Scott Galloway (New Zealand) Luke Jones (South Korea) Ko Young-jo |

=== September ===
| Tournament | Date | Champion | Runner-Up | Semifinalists | Quarterfinalists |
|---|---|---|---|---|---|
| Malaysian Squash Tour X Kuala Lumpur, Malaysia; Men : PSA 5; 16 players - $5,000 −−−−−− Women : PSA 5; 16 players - $5,000 | 6–8 September | (India) Harinder Pal Sandhu; 11–8, 10–12, 11–3, 9–11, 11–6 (10th PSA title) | (Malaysia) Mohd Syafiq Kamal | (Malaysia) Darren Rahul Pragasam (Czech Republic) Ondřej Uherka | (Iran) Sajad Zareian (Malaysia) Addeen Idrakie (India) Ramit Tandon (Malaysia) Sanjay Singh |
| Malaysian Squash Tour X Kuala Lumpur, Malaysia; Men : PSA 5; 16 players - $5,000 −−−−−− Women : PSA 5; 16 players - $5,000 | 6–8 September | (Malaysia) Andrea Lee; 11–6, 11–7, 11–13, 11–8 (2nd PSA title) | (Malaysia) Rachel Arnold | (Malaysia) Wen Li Lai (Hong Kong) Ka Yi Lee | (Malaysia) Nazihah Hanis (Malaysia) Chan Yiwen (Malaysia) Ooi Kah Yan (Malaysia) Aika Azman |
| HKFC International; Hong Kong, China; Men : PSA 25; 16 players - $25,000 - Draw −−−−−− Women : PSA 25; 16 players - $25,000 - Draw | 6–9 September | (Hong Kong) Leo Au; 8–11, 8–11, 11–6, 15–13, 11–7 (9th PSA title) | (Egypt) Omar Mosaad | (Malaysia) Nafiizwan Adnan (Egypt) Omar Abdel Meguid | (Scotland) Alan Clyne (New Zealand) Campbell Grayson (Hong Kong) Yip Tsz Fung (India) Vikram Malhotra |
| HKFC International; Hong Kong, China; Men : PSA 25; 16 players - $25,000 - Draw −−−−−− Women : PSA 25; 16 players - $25,000 - Draw | 6–9 September | (Egypt) Nour El Tayeb; 11–4, 11–4, 11–4 (4th PSA title) | (India) Joshna Chinappa | (Hong Kong) Annie Au (Wales) Tesni Evans | (Hong Kong) Liu Tsz Ling (India) Dipika Pallikal (Hong Kong) Joey Chan (Hong Kong) Ho Tze-Lok |
| Open International de Nantes; Nantes, France; Men : PSA 25; 16 players - $25,000 - Draw | 6–10 September | (France) Grégoire Marche; 11–9, 7–11, 9–11, 11–5, 11–3 (7th PSA title) | (Switzerland) Nicolas Müller | (Egypt) Mazen Hesham (England) Ben Coleman | (France) Mathieu Castagnet (Finland) Olli Tuominen (Qatar) Abdulla Al-Tamimi (England) Chris Simpson |
| Open International de Nantes; Nantes, France; Women : PSA 15; 16 players - $15,000 - Draw | 6–10 September | (England) Fiona Moverley; 11–9, 11–9, 11–7 (7th PSA title) | (Belgium) Nele Gilis | (England) Millie Tomlinson (Canada) Hollie Naughton | (France) Coline Aumard (Japan) Misaki Kobayashi (Malaysia) Siva. Subramaniam (Egypt) Nouran El Torky |
| North Coast Open; Coffs Harbour, Australia; Men : PSA 5; 16 players - $5,000 −−−−−− Women : PSA 5; 16 players - $5,000 | 8–10 September | (Switzerland) Dimitri Steinmann; 11–5, 11–1, 11–5 (2nd PSA title) | (India) Abhay Singh | (Australia) Rhys Dowling (Belgium) Joeri Hapers | (Australia) Matthew Hopkin (Australia) Solayman Nowrozi (Pakistan) Amaad Fareed (Australia) Thomas Calvert |
| North Coast Open; Coffs Harbour, Australia; Men : PSA 5; 16 players - $5,000 −−−−−− Women : PSA 5; 16 players - $5,000 | 8–10 September | (Australia) Tamika Saxby; 11–7, 11–6, 11–3 (7th PSA title) | (India) Sunayna Kuruvilla | (Australia) Lisa Camilleri (South Korea) Yura Choi | (Australia) Christine Nunn (Wales) Jenny Haley (Australia) Samantha Foyle (South Korea) Min Gyeong |
| Duffield Morson International*; Duffield, England; Men : PSA 10; 16 players - $8,000 | 9–11 September | (Australia) Joseph Kneipp; 15–7, 15–6, 15–10 | (England) Paul Lord | (England) Marcus Berrett (Pakistan) Zarak Jahan Khan | (Pakistan) Ajaz Azmat (England) Julian Wellings (Pakistan) Mir Zaman Gul (England) Paul Hargrave |
| Beijing Squash Challenge; Beijing, China; Women : PSA 5; 16 players - $5,000 | 13–16 September | (Malaysia) Sivasangari Subramaniam; 11–7, 11–8, 11–4 (7th PSA title) | (Hong Kong) Vanessa Chu | (Hong Kong) Tong Tsz Wing (Belgium) Tinne Gilis | (South Korea) Eum Hwa-yeong (South Korea) Min Gyeong (South Korea) Ji Young-you (China) Duan Siyu |
| Kiva Club Open; Santa Fe, United States; Men : PSA 5; 16 players - $5,000 | 14–17 September | (Mexico) Eric Gálvez; 6–11, 11–9, 11–13, 11–4, 11–6 (15th PSA title) | (Colombia) Juan Camilo Vargas | (England) Reuben Phillips (Mexico) Miled Zarazúa | (Canada) Cameron Seth (Wales) Sam Fenwick (United States) David Cromwell (France) Sébastien Bonmalais |
| NSW Open; Thornleigh, Sydney, Australia; Men : PSA 5; 16 players - $5,000 −−−−−− Women : PSA 5; 16 players - $5,000 | 15–17 September | (Pakistan) Amaad Fareed; 11–5, 12–10, 11–5 (2nd PSA title) | (Australia) Matthew Hopkin | (Switzerland) Dimitri Steinmann (Australia) Matthew Karwalski | (Australia) Thomas Calvert (India) Abhay Singh (Belgium) Joeri Hapers (New Zealand) Luke Jones |
| NSW Open; Thornleigh, Sydney, Australia; Men : PSA 5; 16 players - $5,000 −−−−−− Women : PSA 5; 16 players - $5,000 | 15–17 September | (Australia) Tamika Saxby; 11–5, 11–7, 8–11, 11–4 (8th PSA title) | (Australia) Jessica Turnbull | (New Zealand) Abbie Palmer (Australia) Moana Gray | (South Korea) Yura Choi (India) Sunayna Kuruvilla (Australia) Selena Shaikh (Australia) Samantha Calvert |
| Malaysian Squash Tour XI; Kuala Lumpur, Malaysia; Men : PSA 5; 16 players - $5,000 −−−−−− Women : PSA 5; 16 players - $5,000 | 20–22 September | (Malaysia) Mohd Syafiq Kamal; 11–9, 4–11, 7–11, 11–8, 15–13 (2nd PSA title) | (Malaysia) Addeen Idrakie | (Malaysia) Elvinn Keo (Pakistan) Amaad Fareed | (Pakistan) Sajad Zareian (Hong Kong) Alex Lau (England) Robert Downer (Malaysia) Ong Sai Hung |
| Malaysian Squash Tour XI; Kuala Lumpur, Malaysia; Men : PSA 5; 16 players - $5,000 −−−−−− Women : PSA 5; 16 players - $5,000 | 20–22 September | (Malaysia) Sivasangari Subramaniam; 11–6, 11–4, 8–11, 11–4 (8th PSA title) | (Malaysia) Rachel Arnold | (Scotland) Lisa Aitken (Malaysia) Andrea Lee | (Japan) Satomi Watanabe (Malaysia) Aina Ampandi (Malaysia) Chan Yiwen (Malaysia) Ooi Kah Yan |
| Harrow Sports Charlottesville Open; Charlottesville, United States; Men : PSA 25; 16 players - $25,000 | 20–23 September | (Switzerland) Nicolas Müller; 6–11, 11–5, 11–7, 11–5 (9th PSA title) | (Scotland) Greg Lobban | (Egypt) Mazen Hesham (Egypt) Mohammed Reda | (Qatar) Abdulla Al-Tamimi (Mexico) Arturo Salazar (England) Adrian Waller (France) Lucas Serme |
| NASH Cup; London, Canada; Men : PSA 15; 16 players - $15,000 −−−−−− Women : PSA 15; 16 players - $15,000 | 20–23 September | (England) Tom Richards; 9–11, 11–4, 15–13, 11–5 (5th PSA title) | (Wales) Joel Makin | (England) Nathan Lake (Egypt) Youssef Soliman | (Pakistan) Farhan Zaman (Belgium) Jan Van Den Herrewegen (England) Ben Coleman (Canada) Nick Sachvie |
| NASH Cup; London, Canada; Men : PSA 15; 16 players - $15,000 −−−−−− Women : PSA 15; 16 players - $15,000 | 20–23 September | (England) Millie Tomlinson; 9–11, 11–8, 14–12, 11–8 (12th PSA title) | (England) Fiona Moverley | (Canada) Nikki Todd (New Zealand) Amanda Landers-Murphy | (Egypt) Nouran El Torky (Japan) Misaki Kobayashi (Canada) Danielle Letourneau (Canada) Samantha Cornett |
| Macau Open; Macau, China; Men : PSA 50; 16 players - $50,000 - Draw −−−−−− Women : PSA 50; 16 players - $50,000 - Draw | 21–24 September | (Egypt) Mohamed Abouelghar; 11–1, 11–4, 11–4 (8th PSA title) | (India) Saurav Ghosal | (Germany) Simon Rösner (Egypt) Omar Abdel Meguid | (Egypt) Omar Mosaad (Hong Kong) Max Lee (Hong Kong) Yip Tsz Fung (Germany) Raphael Kandra |
| Macau Open; Macau, China; Men : PSA 50; 16 players - $50,000 - Draw −−−−−− Women : PSA 50; 16 players - $50,000 - Draw | 21–24 September | (Egypt) Nouran Gohar; 13–11, 11–7, 12–10 (5th PSA title) | (New Zealand) Joelle King | (Hong Kong) Annie Au (Egypt) Yathreb Adel | (Australia) Donna Urquhart (Hong Kong) Joey Chan (Wales) Tesni Evans (Egypt) Mariam Metwally |
| 10ª Copa INOB; Brasília, Brazil; Men : PSA 5; 16 players - $5,000 | 21–24 September | (France) Auguste Dussourd; 4–11, 11–9, 7–11, 11–6, 11–8 (2nd PSA title) | (Mexico) Leonel Cárdenas | (Mexico) Allan Núñez (Colombia) Andrés Herrera | (Colombia) Edgar Ramírez (Argentina) Ignacio Gutiérrez (Brazil) Diego Gobbi (Brazil) Rodrigo Dias |
| Oracle Netsuite Open; San Francisco, United States; Men : PSA 100; 16 players - $100,000 - Draw | 26–30 September | (Egypt) Mohamed El Shorbagy; 11–9, 11–6, 11–3 (26th PSA title) | (Egypt) Karim Abdel Gawad | (Peru) Diego Elías (England) James Willstrop | (England) Nick Matthew (Egypt) Tarek Momen (Australia) Ryan Cuskelly (England) Daryl Selby |
| Oracle Netsuite Open; San Francisco, United States; Women : PSA 50; 16 players - $50,000 - Draw | 26–30 September | (England) Sarah-Jane Perry; 8–11, 8–11, 11–7, 14–12, 11–7 (9th PSA title) | (Malaysia) Nicol David | (England) Laura Massaro (India) Dipika Pallikal | (England) Victoria Lust (Egypt) Salma Hany (Australia) Donna Urquhart (United States) Olivia Blatchford |
| Barcelona Squash Open; Barcelona, Spain; Men : PSA 5; 16 players - $5,000 −−−−−− Women : PSA 5; 16 players - $5,000 | 27–30 September | (Spain) Iker Pajares; 11–6, 12–10, 11–7 (6th PSA title) | (Spain) Edmon López | (France) Victor Crouin (Spain) Bernat Jaume | (Czech Republic) Daniel Mekbib (Scotland) Douglas Kempsell (France) Baptiste Masotti (England) Mark Fuller |
| Barcelona Squash Open; Barcelona, Spain; Men : PSA 5; 16 players - $5,000 −−−−−− Women : PSA 5; 16 players - $5,000 | 27–30 September | (England) Lucy Turmel; 14–16, 12–10, 11–7, 9–11, 11–9 (1st PSA title) | (Wales) Deon Saffery | (Netherlands) Tessa Ter Sluis (Belgium) Tinne Gilis | (France) Chloé Mesic (France) Énora Villard (Latvia) Ineta Mackeviča (Scotland) Georgia Adderley |
| DPD Open; Amsterdam, Netherlands; Men : PSA 25; 16 players - $25,000 | 28 Sep.–1 Oct. | (England) Adrian Waller; 4–11, 11–7, 10–12, 11–8, 3–11 (6th PSA title) | (England) Declan James | (England) Chris Simpson (Wales) Joel Makin | (Egypt) Omar Abdel Meguid (Finland) Olli Tuominen (England) Tom Richards (Egypt) Karim Ali Fathy |

(*) – Seniors tournament.

=== October ===
| Tournament | Date | Champion | Runner-Up | Semifinalists | Quarterfinalists |
|---|---|---|---|---|---|
| Union National Bank ISC 5th UAE Open; Abu Dhabi, United Arab Emirates; Men : PSA 5; 16 players - $5,000 | 5–7 October | (Spain) Edmon López; 11–7, 11–9, 11–7 (2nd PSA title) | (Kuwait) Ammar Al-Tamimi | (Pakistan) Amaad Fareed (England) Robert Downer | (Iran) Sajad Zareian (Kuwait) Abdullah Al-Muzayen (Pakistan) Khawaja Adil Maqbool (Pakistan) Zeeshan Khan |
| U.S. Open by Macquarie Investment Management; Philadelphia, United States; Men : World Series; 32 players - $165,000 - Draw −−−−−− Women : World Series; 32 players - $165,000 - Draw | 7–14 October | (Egypt) Ali Farag; 12–10, 11–9, 11–8 (10th PSA title) | (Egypt) Mohamed El Shorbagy | (England) Nick Matthew (Egypt) Omar Mosaad | (Egypt) Fares Dessouky (Peru) Diego Elías (Germany) Simon Rösner (England) Daryl Selby |
| U.S. Open by Macquarie Investment Management; Philadelphia, United States; Men : World Series; 32 players - $165,000 - Draw −−−−−− Women : World Series; 32 players - $165,000 - Draw | 7–14 October | (Egypt) Nour El Tayeb; 8–11, 11–4, 5–11, 11–7, 11–5 (5th PSA title) | (Egypt) Raneem El Weleily | (New Zealand) Joelle King (England) Laura Massaro | (Egypt) Nouran Gohar (Egypt) Nour El Sherbini (Hong Kong) Annie Au (England) Alison Waters |
| Performance Auto Group White Oaks C. Classic; Niagara-on-the-Lake, Canada; Men : PSA 10; 16 players - $10,000 | 11–14 October | (Australia) Zac Alexander; 11–5, 11–8, 11–7 (27th PSA title) | (Jamaica) Christopher Binnie | (Canada) Shawn Delierre (Pakistan) Farhan Zaman | (England) Adam Murrills (France) Victor Crouin (Canada) Nick Sachvie (Canada) Andrew Schnell |
| Ohana Malaysian Open; Kuala Lumpur, Malaysia; Men : PSA 25; 16 players - $25,000 | 18–21 October | (Hong Kong) Leo Au; 11–6, 11–2, 11–4 (10th PSA title) | (Malaysia) Eain Yow | (Malaysia) Ivan Yuen (Egypt) Mazen Hesham | (Egypt) Mazen Gamal (United States) Christopher Gordon (England) Joshua Masters (Malaysia) Sanjay Singh |
| Ohana Malaysian Open; Kuala Lumpur, Malaysia; Women : PSA 10; 16 players - $10,000 | 18–21 October | (Malaysia) Sivasangari Subramaniam; 11–9, 11–3, 11–5 (9th PSA title) | (South Africa) Milnay Louw | (Egypt) Zeina Mickawy (Japan) Satomi Watanabe | (Hong Kong) Ka Yi Lee (Scotland) Alison Thomson (Malaysia) Aifa Azman (Malaysia) Rachel Arnold |
| Channel VAS Championship at St George's Hill; Weybridge, England; Men : PSA 100; 16 players - $100,000 | 18–22 October | (Egypt) Mohamed El Shorbagy; 6–11, 11–9, 11–5, 12–10 (27th PSA title) | (Egypt) Ali Farag | (India) Saurav Ghosal (Peru) Diego Elías | (Colombia) Miguel Ángel Rodríguez (Egypt) Mohamed Abouelghar (Egypt) Tarek Momen (New Zealand) Paul Coll |
| Life Time Chicago Open; Chicago, United States; Men : PSA 25; 16 players - $25,000 | 19–22 October | (Mexico) César Salazar; 11–8, 11–9, 11–9 (5th PSA title) | (Wales) Joel Makin | (New Zealand) Campbell Grayson (Egypt) Omar Abdel Meguid | (Mexico) Arturo Salazar (United States) Todd Harrity (England) Ashley Davies (Pakistan) Farhan Mehboob |
| Queensland Open; Gold Coast, Australia; Men : PSA 10; 16 players - $10,000 −−−−−− Women : PSA 10; 16 players - $10,000 | 19–22 October | (Australia) Rex Hedrick; 11–3, 11–8, 11–4 (11th PSA title) | (Australia) Joshua Larkin | (Australia) Rhys Dowling (Australia) Matthew Hopkin | (Switzerland) Dimitri Steinmann (Israel) Roee Avraham (New Zealand) Evan Williams (Hong Kong) Alex Lau |
| Queensland Open; Gold Coast, Australia; Men : PSA 10; 16 players - $10,000 −−−−−− Women : PSA 10; 16 players - $10,000 | 19–22 October | (England) Jenny Duncalf; 12–14, 11–6, 12–10, 12–10 (11th PSA title) | (Australia) Christine Nunn | (Hong Kong) Tong Tsz Wing (Australia) Rachael Grinham | (Hong Kong) Ho Tze-Lok (Hong Kong) Vanessa Chu (New Zealand) Abbie Palmer (Australia) Tamika Saxby |
| PSA Valencia; Paterna, Spain; Men : PSA 10; 16 players - $10,000 | 19–22 October | (Belgium) Jan Van Den Herrewegen; 4–11, 11–7, 6–11, 11–6, 11–9 (3rd PSA title) | (Spain) Edmon López | (Denmark) Kristian Frost (Spain) Carlos Cornes | (Spain) Iker Pajares (England) Patrick Rooney (Scotland) Douglas Kempsell (France) Baptiste Masotti |
| Country Club Cochabamba Bolivia Open; Cochabamba, Bolivia; Men : PSA 5; 16 players - $5,000 | 19–22 October | (Mexico) Leonel Cárdenas; 9–11, 11–4, 7–11, 12–10, 11–6 (1st PSA title) | (Colombia) Juan Camilo Vargas | (Brazil) Diego Gobbi (Mexico) Allan Núñez | (Argentina) Ignacio Gutiérrez (Colombia) Andrés Herrera (Argentina) Juan Pablo Roude (Bolivia) Gabriel Tórrez |
| PwC Ladies Open; Frick, Switzerland; Women : PSA 5; 16 players - $5,000 | 19–22 October | (Scotland) Lisa Aitken; 11–7, 9–11, 11–7, 11–7 (2nd PSA title) | (Belgium) Tinne Gilis | (England) Julianne Courtice (England) Rachael Chadwick | (England) Grace Gear (England) Lucy Turmel (Spain) Cristina Gómez (Netherlands) Tessa Ter Sluis |
| Carol Weymuller Open; Brooklyn, United States; Women : PSA 50; 16 players - $50,000 - Draw | 19–23 October | (Egypt) Nour El Sherbini; 11–7, 11–5, 11–3 (12th PSA title) | (New Zealand) Joelle King | (Egypt) Raneem El Weleily (Egypt) Salma Hany | (Egypt) Nour El Tayeb (England) Victoria Lust (Egypt) Mariam Metwally (Hong Kong) Annie Au |
| Slaight Music Granite Open; Toronto, Canada; Women : PSA 15; 16 players - $15,000 | 24–27 October | (Egypt) Hania El Hammamy w/o (2nd PSA title) | (Egypt) Yathreb Adel | (Canada) Samantha Cornett (England) Millie Tomlinson | (Canada) Danielle Letourneau (New Zealand) Amanda Landers-Murphy (Netherlands) Milou van der Heijden (Egypt) Nada Abbas |
| Skating Club Open; Cleveland, United States; Men : PSA 10; 16 players - $10,000 | 25–28 October | (Egypt) Mohamed ElSherbini; 9–11, 11–6, 11–1, 3–11, 11–3 (5th PSA title) | (Canada) Shawn Delierre | (India) Vikram Malhotra (Canada) Michael McCue | (Argentina) Robertino Pezzota (Pakistan) Ahsan Ayaz (Wales) Peter Creed (Austria) Aqeel Rehman |
| Tournoi Féminin Val de Marne; Créteil, France; Women : PSA 5; 16 players - $5,000 | 26–28 October | (Belgium) Tinne Gilis; 11–2, 11–1, 8–11, 11–7 (1st PSA title) | (France) Énora Villard | (England) Grace Gear (Scotland) Lisa Aitken | (France) Elise Romba (France) Chloé Mesic (Czech Republic) Anna Serme (Netherlands) Tessa Ter Sluis |
| Pacific Toyota Cairns International; Cairns, Australia; Men : PSA 5; 16 players - $5,000 −−−−−− Women : PSA 5; 16 players - $5,000 | 27–29 October | (Hong Kong) Alex Lau; 11–9, 11–9, 9–11, 11–3 (2nd PSA title) | (Switzerland) Dimitri Steinmann | (Australia) Steven Finitsis (New Zealand) Evan Williams | (South Korea) Yoo Jae-jin (Malaysia) Bryan Lim Tze Kang (Wales) David Haley (New Zealand) Chris Van der Salm |
| Pacific Toyota Cairns International; Cairns, Australia; Men : PSA 5; 16 players - $5,000 −−−−−− Women : PSA 5; 16 players - $5,000 | 27–29 October | (Australia) Tamika Saxby; 11–9, 11–7, 14–12 (9th PSA title) | (Hong Kong) Tong Tsz Wing | (Australia) Jessica Turnbull (Hong Kong) Vanessa Chu | (New Zealand) Abbie Palmer (Australia) Taylor Flavell (New Zealand) Kaitlyn Watts (Australia) Selena Shaikh |
| Qatar Classic; Doha, Qatar; Men : World Series; 32 players - $165,000 - Draw | 29 Oct.–3 Nov. | (Egypt) Mohamed El Shorbagy; 11–8, 10–12, 11–7, 11–7 (28th PSA title) | (Egypt) Tarek Momen | (France) Grégory Gaultier (Germany) Simon Rösner | (Egypt) Ali Farag (England) Nick Matthew (Egypt) Marwan El Shorbagy (Peru) Diego Elías |

=== November ===
| Tournament | Date | Champion | Runner-Up | Semifinalists | Quarterfinalists |
|---|---|---|---|---|---|
| Meadow Mill AC 25th Anniversary Celebration; Baltimore, United States; Men : PSA 5; 16 players - $5,000 | 1–4 November | (Jamaica) Christopher Binnie; 11–6, 11–7, 13–11 (3rd PSA title) | (Pakistan) Syed Hamzah Bukhari | (Austria) Aqeel Rehman (Argentina) Robertino Pezzota | (Argentina) Leandro Romiglio (England) Reuben Phillips (France) Vincent Droesbeke (England) Anthony Graham |
| Guatemala Open; Guatemala City, Guatemala; Men : PSA 5; 16 players - $5,000 | 1–4 November | (France) Sébastien Bonmalais; 11–3, 2–11, 11–4, 7–11, 11–7 (2nd PSA title) | (Mexico) Jesús Camacho | (Mexico) Mario Yáñez (Guatemala) Alejandro Enríquez | (El Salvador) Ernesto Molina (Canada) Joshua Hollings (Guatemala) Josué Enríquez (Cayman Islands) Cameron Stafford |
| ISF Peace and Friendship Cup; Urmia, Iran; Men : PSA 5; 16 players - $5,000 | 2–5 November | (Iran) Sajad Zareian; 14–12, 9–11, 9–11, 11–8, 11–8 (1st PSA title) | (Pakistan) Khawaja Adil Maqbool | (Iraq) Mohammed F Hasan (Iraq) Rasool Alsultani | (Iran) Alireza Shameli (Iran) Soheil Shameli (Iran) Mohammad Kashani (Iraq) Ahmed Al Kiremli |
| 5th Open Provence Chateau-Arnoux; Château-Arnoux-Saint-Auban, France; Men : PSA 5; 16 players - $5,000 | 3–5 November | (France) Auguste Dussourd; 11–7, 7–11, 13–11, 11–5 (3rd PSA title) | (France) Victor Crouin | (Finland) Jami Äijänen (Wales) Emyr Evans | (France) Enzo Corigliano (Canada) David Baillargeon (France) Benjamin Aubert (England) Charlie Lee |
| JSW CCI International; Mumbai, India; Men : PSA 50; 16 players - $50,000 | 7–10 November | (India) Saurav Ghosal; 11–6, 11–8, 11–8 (7th PSA title) | (Switzerland) Nicolas Müller | (Egypt) Omar Mosaad (India) Ramit Tandon | (Spain) Borja Golán (India) Harinder Pal Sandhu (Wales) Joel Makin (Egypt) Mazen Gamal |
| Open International Niort-Venise Verte; Bessines, France; Men : PSA 10; 16 players - $10,000 | 9–12 November | (England) Ben Coleman; 10–12, 11–8, 3–11, 13–11, 11–8 (9th PSA title) | (England) Richie Fallows | (France) Benjamin Aubert (France) Baptiste Masotti | (England) George Parker (Egypt) Karim El Hammamy (Denmark) Kristian Frost (England) Patrick Rooney |
| Tree Brewing Kelowna Open; Kelowna, Canada; Men : PSA 5; 16 players - $5,000 | 9–12 November | (Mexico) Eric Gálvez; 11–7, 4–11, 11–8, 11–1 (16th PSA title) | (Switzerland) Reiko Peter | (Canada) Nick Sachvie (Canada) Michael McCue | (Mexico) Fernando Magdaleno (Bermuda) Noah Browne (South Africa) Tristan Eysele (Finland) Matias Tuomi |
| Australian Open; Darwin, Australia; Men : PSA 10; 32 players - $10,000 −−−−−− Women : PSA 10; 16 players - $10,000 | 14–18 November | (Malaysia) Eain Yow; 13–11, 11–6, 11–9 (3rd PSA title) | (Australia) Joshua Larkin | (Australia) Rhys Dowling (Australia) Rex Hedrick | (Malaysia) Darren Rahul Pragasam (Malaysia) Addeen Idrakie (Australia) Thomas Calvert (Japan) Naoki Hayashi |
| Australian Open; Darwin, Australia; Men : PSA 10; 32 players - $10,000 −−−−−− Women : PSA 10; 16 players - $10,000 | 14–18 November | (Australia) Rachael Grinham; 11–5, 11–9, 11–7 (35th PSA title) | (Malaysia) Sivasangari Subramaniam | (Australia) Christine Nunn (Egypt) Nouran El Torky | (Australia) Jessica Turnbull (New Zealand) Abbie Palmer (Australia) Tamika Saxby (Australia) Taylor Flavell |
| Cathay Pacific Sun Hung Kai Hong Kong Open; Hong Kong, China; Men : World Series; 32 players - $165,000 - Draw −−−−−− Women : World Series; 32 players - $140,000 - Draw | 14–19 November | (Egypt) Mohamed El Shorbagy; 11–6, 5–11, 11–4, 7–11, 11–3 (29th PSA title) | (Egypt) Ali Farag | (Egypt) Karim Abdel Gawad (Egypt) Marwan El Shorbagy | (Egypt) Tarek Momen (Egypt) Mohamed Abouelghar (France) Grégory Gaultier (England) Declan James |
| Cathay Pacific Sun Hung Kai Hong Kong Open; Hong Kong, China; Men : World Series; 32 players - $165,000 - Draw −−−−−− Women : World Series; 32 players - $140,000 - Draw | 14–19 November | (Egypt) Nour El Sherbini; 11–5, 11–8, 11–5 (13th PSA title) | (Egypt) Raneem El Weleily | (France) Camille Serme (England) Laura Massaro | (New Zealand) Joelle King (Wales) Tesni Evans (Malaysia) Nicol David (Egypt) Nouran Gohar |
| Alliance Fabricating Ltd./Simon Warder Memorial; Sarnia, Canada; Men : PSA 5; 16 players - $5,000 −−−−−− Women : PSA 5; 16 players - $5,000 | 15–18 November | (England) Ashley Davies; 11–8, 11–3, 9–11, 11–6 (2nd PSA title) | (United States) Chris Hanson | (England) Adam Murrills (England) Anthony Graham | (Mexico) Leonel Cárdenas (Bermuda) Micah Franklin (England) Mark Broekman (Netherlands) Tess Jutte |
| Alliance Fabricating Ltd./Simon Warder Memorial; Sarnia, Canada; Men : PSA 5; 16 players - $5,000 −−−−−− Women : PSA 5; 16 players - $5,000 | 15–18 November | (Canada) Nikki Todd; 11–7, 11–7, 4–11, 9–11, 11–7 (1st PSA title) | (Mexico) Diana García | (Egypt) Ingy Hammouda (Canada) Nicole Bunyan | (Brazil) Thaisa Serafini (Canada) Micaala Seth (Finland) Emilia Soini (Wales) Ali Hemingway |
| Saskatoon Movember Boast; Saskatoon, Canada; Men : PSA 10; 16 players - $10,000 | 16–19 November | (Wales) Peter Creed; 11–9, 11–7, 11–4 (8th PSA title) | (Switzerland) Reiko Peter | (Canada) Shawn Delierre (Canada) Nick Sachvie | (Switzerland) Dimitri Steinmann (Egypt) Ahmed Hosny (Canada) Michael McCue (Mexico) Eric Gálvez |
| Romanian Open; Cluj-Napoca, Romania; Men : PSA 5; 16 players - $5,000 | 17–19 November | (Spain) Bernat Jaume; 13–11, 11–6, 8–11, 11–3 (1st PSA title) | (Austria) Aqeel Rehman | (Czech Republic) Daniel Mekbib (England) Lyell Fuller | (England) James Peach (Czech Republic) Ondřej Uherka (New Zealand) Ben Grindrod (Hungary) Balázs Farkas |
| Aston & Fincher Sutton Coldfield International; Sutton Coldfield, England; Men : PSA 5; 16 players - $5,000 | 22–25 November | (Belgium) Jan Van Den Herrewegen; 14–12, 11–6, 12–10 (4th PSA title) | (England) Jaymie Haycocks | (England) Charlie Lee (Jamaica) Lewis Walters | (Wales) Owain Taylor (England) Mark Fuller (Scotland) Rory Stewart (England) Matthew Broadberry |
| IMET PSA Open; Bratislava, Slovakia; Men : PSA 10; 32 players - $10,000 | 22–26 November | (Spain) Edmon López; 9–11, 11–7, 12–10, 8–11, 11–6 (3rd PSA title) | (France) Auguste Dussourd | (France) Geoffrey Demont (France) Enzo Corigliano | (Hungary) Balázs Farkas (Czech Republic) Daniel Mekbib (Czech Republic) Ondřej Uherka (Austria) Aqeel Rehman |
| Qatar Circuit No.4; Doha, Qatar; Men : PSA 15; 32 players - $15,000 | 24–28 November | (Qatar) Abdulla Al-Tamimi; 11–2, 11–5, 11–4 (4th PSA title) | (Egypt) Karim El Hammamy | (Egypt) Youssef Soliman (Malaysia) Sanjay Singh | (Kuwait) Abdullah Al-Muzayen (England) Ben Coleman (India) Ramit Tandon (Kuwait) Ammar Al-Tamimi |
| Securian Open; St. Paul, United States; Men : PSA 10; 16 players - $10,000 | 29 Nov.–2 Dec. | (Mexico) Jesús Camacho; 11–8, 13–11, 11–8 (3rd PSA title) | (England) Angus Gillams | (Egypt) Mohamed ElSherbini (England) Ashley Davies | (Colombia) Juan Camilo Vargas (England) Charlie Johnson (England) Joe Green (United States) Andrew Douglas |
| Airport Squash & Fitness Xmas Challenger; Berlin, Germany; Men : PSA 5; 16 players - $5,000 | 29 Nov.–2 Dec. | (France) Auguste Dussourd; 11–3, 11–2, 11–1 (4th PSA title) | (France) Benjamin Aubert | (France) Geoffrey Demont (Canada) David Baillargeon | (Spain) Edmon López (England) Nick Mulvey (England) Bradley Masters (Israel) Roee Avraham |
| London Open; London, England; Men : PSA 15; 16 players - $15,000 −−−−−− Women : PSA 15; 16 players - $15,000 | 30 Nov.–3 Dec. | (England) Declan James; 11–4, 9–11, 16–14, 11–5 (12th PSA title) | (England) Tom Richards | (England) Joshua Masters (Mexico) Arturo Salazar | (England) Richie Fallows (England) Charles Sharpes (Egypt) Shehab Essam (England) Ben Coleman |
| London Open; London, England; Men : PSA 15; 16 players - $15,000 −−−−−− Women : PSA 15; 16 players - $15,000 | 30 Nov.–3 Dec. | (New Zealand) Amanda Landers-Murphy w/o (12th PSA title) | (England) Emily Whitlock | (England) Julianne Courtice (Egypt) Zeina Mickawy | (England) Lucy Turmel (Canada) Hollie Naughton (United States) Haley Mendez (Egypt) Menna Hamed |

=== December ===
| Tournament | Date | Champion | Runner-Up | Semifinalists | Quarterfinalists |
|---|---|---|---|---|---|
| Monte Carlo Classic; Monte Carlo, Monaco; Women : PSA 25; 16 players - $25,000 | 5–8 December | (Australia) Donna Urquhart; 7–11, 11–4, 10–12, 11–2, 11–9 (10th PSA title) | (Egypt) Zeina Mickawy | (Australia) Rachael Grinham (Egypt) Rowan Elaraby | (England) Millie Tomlinson (Netherlands) Milou van der Heijden (Belgium) Nele Gilis (New Zealand) Amanda Landers-Murphy |
| Life Time Florida Open; Boca Raton, United States; Men : PSA 10; 16 players - $10,000 | 7–10 December | (Mexico) Jesús Camacho; 11–6, 11–6, 11–7 (4th PSA title) | (Canada) David Baillargeon | (England) Joe Green (France) Vincent Droesbeke | (Belgium) Joeri Hapers (England) Alex Noakes (United States) Dylan Cunningham (England) Angus Gillams |
| Singapore Open; Singapore; Men : PSA 5; 16 players - $5,000 | 7–10 December | (India) Ramit Tandon; 11–3, 11–6, 11–3 (2nd PSA title) | (Chinese Taipei) James Huang | (Philippines) Robert Andrew Garcia (Hong Kong) Henry Leung | (Malaysia) Elvinn Keo (Hong Kong) Chris Lo (Indonesia) Vivian Rhamanan (Hong Kong) Graham Miao |
| Ocean Blue Grimsby & Cleethorpes Open; Grimsby, England; Men : PSA 5; 16 players - $5,000 | 8–10 December | (France) Victor Crouin; 11–7, 11–5, 11–7 (2nd PSA title) | (England) Adam Auckland | (Wales) Emyr Evans (Czech Republic) Ondřej Uherka | (England) Nicholas Wall (Czech Republic) Martin Švec (France) Enzo Corigliano (England) Michael Harris |
| AJ Bell PSA World Championship; Manchester, England; Men : World Championship; 64 players - $325,000 - Draw −−−−−− Women : World Championship; 64 players - $279,000 - Draw | 10–17 December | (Egypt) Mohamed El Shorbagy; 11–5, 9–11, 11–7, 9–11, 11–6 (30th PSA title) | (Egypt) Marwan El Shorbagy | (Egypt) Ali Farag (France) Grégory Gaultier | (England) Nick Matthew (Colombia) Miguel Ángel Rodríguez (Egypt) Karim Abdel Gawad (New Zealand) Paul Coll |
| AJ Bell PSA World Championship; Manchester, England; Men : World Championship; 64 players - $325,000 - Draw −−−−−− Women : World Championship; 64 players - $279,000 - Draw | 10–17 December | (Egypt) Raneem El Weleily; 3–11, 12–10, 11–7, 11–5 (16th PSA title) | (Egypt) Nour El Sherbini | (Egypt) Nour El Tayeb (France) Camille Serme | (Malaysia) Nicol David (Wales) Tesni Evans (Egypt) Nouran Gohar (New Zealand) Joelle King |
| Iran Navy Squash Open; Tehran, Iran; Men : PSA 10; 16 players - $10,000 | 12–15 December | (Pakistan) Asim Khan; 11–5, 11–4, 8–11, 12–10 (1st PSA title) | (Czech Republic) Martin Švec | (Pakistan) Ahsan Ayaz (Iran) Alireza Shameli | (Hong Kong) Chi Him Wong (Iran) Soheil Shameli (Czech Republic) Ondřej Uherka (Iraq) Hasanain Dakheel |
| Internazionali d'Italia; Riccione, Italy; Men : PSA 5; 16 players - $5,000 −−−−−− Women : PSA 5; 16 players - $5,000 | 14–17 December | (France) Benjamin Aubert; 11–4, 11–5, 10–12, 11–6 (2nd PSA title) | (England) Adam Murrills | (England) Bradley Masters (Italy) Yuri Farneti | (New Zealand) Lance Beddoes (England) Kyle Finch (Italy) Muhammad Bilal (England) Miles Jenkins |
| Internazionali d'Italia; Riccione, Italy; Men : PSA 5; 16 players - $5,000 −−−−−− Women : PSA 5; 16 players - $5,000 | 14–17 December | (Belgium) Tinne Gilis; 11–9, 11–8, 11–5 (2nd PSA title) | (United States) Haley Mendez | (Finland) Emilia Soini (Colombia) Catalina Peláez | (Latvia) Ineta Mackeviča (Scotland) Alison Thomson (England) Amy Jones (Wales) Lowri Roberts |
| Prague Open; Prague, Czech Republic; Men : PSA 5; 16 players - $5,000 | 14–17 December | (Jordan) Mohammad Alsarraj; 9–11, 11–8, 11–3, 11–9 (5th PSA title) | (Wales) Emyr Evans | (England) Lyell Fuller (Czech Republic) Daniel Mekbib | (Finland) Miko Äijänen (United States) Faraz Khan (England) Stuart MacGregor (England) Charlie Lee |
| Boston Open; Boston, United States; Men : PSA 5; 16 players - $5,000 | 15–18 December | (United States) Chris Hanson; 11–8, 11–5, 11–7 (2nd PSA title) | (Pakistan) Syed Hamzah Bukhari | (England) Reuben Phillips (France) Vincent Droesbeke | (England) Chris Fuller (United States) David Cromwell (United States) Dylan Cunningham (Egypt) Mustafa Nawar |
| KSF Open; Kuwait City, Kuwait; Men : PSA 5; 16 players - $5,000 | 17–20 December | (Kuwait) Abdullah Al-Muzayen; 11–4, 11–5, 11–3 (18th PSA title) | (Spain) Iker Pajares | (England) Robert Downer (Germany) Valentin Rapp | (Egypt) Omar Elkattan (Germany) Yannik Omlor (Kuwait) Ammar Al-Tamimi (Egypt) Khaled Labib |
| Amir Kabir Cup; Arak, Iran; Men : PSA 5; 16 players - $5,000 | 19–22 December | (Iran) Navid Maleksabet; 14–12, 13–11, 11–9 (1st PSA title) | (Iraq) Rasool Alsultani | (Czech Republic) Martin Švec (Iran) Alireza Shameli | (Iran) Sajad Zareian (Iraq) Mohammed Ferman (Iran) Mohammed Jafari (Iran) Mohammad Ataei |
| Chief of the Air Staff International Women's; Islamabad, Pakistan; Women : PSA 25; 16 players - $25,000 | 19–22 December | (Hong Kong) Annie Au; 11–5, 11–7, 11–1 (14th PSA title) | (Malaysia) Sivasangari Subramaniam | (Egypt) Rowan Elaraby (Australia) Rachael Grinham | (Egypt) Hania El Hammamy (Egypt) Nadine Shahin (Egypt) Mayar Hany (Egypt) Hana Moataz |
| Pakistan Open Men's Squash Championships; Islamabad, Pakistan; Men : PSA 50; 32 players - $50,000 | 19–23 December | (Egypt) Marwan El Shorbagy; 11–3, 7–11, 11–5, 11–6 (7th PSA title) | (Egypt) Mohamed Abouelghar | (Hong Kong) Leo Au (Egypt) Zahed Mohamed | (Hong Kong) Max Lee (Malaysia) Nafiizwan Adnan (Malaysia) Eain Yow (Egypt) Mazen Hesham |
| Qatar Circuit No.5; Doha, Qatar; Men : PSA 15; 32 players - $15,000 | 22–26 December | (Spain) Iker Pajares; 11–9, 10–12, 11–9, 14–12 (7th PSA title) | (Qatar) Abdulla Al-Tamimi | (Egypt) Karim El Hammamy (India) Mahesh Mangaonkar | (Switzerland) Dimitri Steinmann (Kuwait) Ammar Al-Tamimi (Spain) Bernat Jaume (Finland) Matias Tuomi |

=== January ===
| Tournament | Date | Champion | Runner-Up | Semifinalists | Quarterfinalists |
|---|---|---|---|---|---|
| Saudi PSA Women's Masters; Riyadh, Saudi Arabia; Women : World Series; 32 players - $165,000 - Draw | 7–12 January | (Egypt) Nour El Sherbini; 11–7, 11–8, 13–11 (14th PSA title) | (Egypt) Raneem El Weleily | (Egypt) Nouran Gohar (Egypt) Nour El Tayeb | (England) Sarah-Jane Perry (Malaysia) Nicol David (New Zealand) Joelle King (India) Dipika Pallikal |
| Malaysian Squash Tour I Kuala Lumpur, Malaysia; Men : PSA 5; 16 players - $5,000 −−−−−− Women : PSA 5; 16 players - $5,000 | 16–19 January | (Pakistan) Asim Khan; 11–4, 11–4, 7–11, 11–5 (2nd PSA title) | (Pakistan) Syed Ali Mujtaba Bokhari | (Malaysia) Muhammad Hannan (India) Abhay Singh | (Malaysia) Darren Rahul Pragasam (Malaysia) Addeen Idrakie (France) Geoffrey Demont (India) Guhan Senthilkumar |
| Malaysian Squash Tour I Kuala Lumpur, Malaysia; Men : PSA 5; 16 players - $5,000 −−−−−− Women : PSA 5; 16 players - $5,000 | 16–19 January | (France) Énora Villard; 11–9, 11–3, 7–11, 13–11 (1st PSA title) | (India) Sunayna Kuruvilla | (Malaysia) Aika Azman (Malaysia) Nazihah Hanis | (Malaysia) Wen Li Lai (Malaysia) Ooi Kah Yan (Wales) Ali Hemingway (Philippines) Jemyca Aribado |
| J.P. Morgan Tournament of Champions; New York City, United States; Men : World Series; 32 players - $165,000 - Draw −−−−−− Women : World Series; 32 players - $165,000 - Draw | 18–25 January | (Germany) Simon Rösner; 11–8, 11–9, 6–11, 11–5 (9th PSA title) | (Egypt) Tarek Momen | (Egypt) Ali Farag (France) Grégory Gaultier | (England) Nick Matthew (Switzerland) Nicolas Müller (Egypt) Ramy Ashour (Australia) Ryan Cuskelly |
| J.P. Morgan Tournament of Champions; New York City, United States; Men : World Series; 32 players - $165,000 - Draw −−−−−− Women : World Series; 32 players - $165,000 - Draw | 18–25 January | (Egypt) Nour El Sherbini; 2–11, 11–6, 4–11, 11–7, 11–7 (15th PSA title) | (Egypt) Nour El Tayeb | (England) Laura Massaro (France) Camille Serme | (Egypt) Raneem El Weleily (Malaysia) Nicol David (Egypt) Nouran Gohar (England) Sarah-Jane Perry |
| Malaysian Squash Tour II; Kuala Lumpur, Malaysia; Men : PSA 5; 16 players - $5,000 −−−−−− Women : PSA 5; 16 players - $5,000 | 24–27 January | (Pakistan) Asim Khan; 11–4, 9–11, 9–11, 11–4, 11–5 (3rd PSA title) | (Malaysia) Mohd Syafiq Kamal | (Qatar) Syed Azlan Amjad (Malaysia) Darren Rahul Pragasam | (Pakistan) Zahir Shah (Pakistan) Syed Ali Mujtaba Bokhari (Malaysia) Ong Sai Hung (Malaysia) Valentino Bong |
| Malaysian Squash Tour II; Kuala Lumpur, Malaysia; Men : PSA 5; 16 players - $5,000 −−−−−− Women : PSA 5; 16 players - $5,000 | 24–27 January | (Malaysia) Aifa Azman; 11–6, 11–7, 11–9 (1st PSA title) | (Malaysia) Andrea Lee | (Philippines) Jemyca Aribado (Malaysia) Ma Si Yi | (Malaysia) Chan Yiwen (Malaysia) Aika Azman (Malaysia) Ooi Kah Yan (Czech Republic) Eva Ferteková |
| Three Rivers Capital Pittsburgh Open; Pittsburgh, United States; Men : PSA 25; 16 players - $25,000 | 25–28 January | (Hong Kong) Max Lee; 11–2, 11–7, 11–5 (12th PSA title) | (England) Ben Coleman | (Wales) Joel Makin (Hong Kong) Yip Tsz Fung | (Botswana) Alister Walker (Egypt) Karim El Hammamy (United States) Todd Harrity (England) Nathan Lake |
| Linear Logistics Pro-Am; Calgary, Canada; Men : PSA 10; 16 players - $10,000 | 25–28 January | (England) George Parker; 11–6, 14–12, 11–9 (5th PSA title) | (Mexico) Alfredo Ávila | (Canada) Andrew Schnell (Canada) Shawn Delierre | (France) Baptiste Masotti (Colombia) Juan Camilo Vargas (Switzerland) Dimitri Steinmann (France) Victor Crouin |
| Edinburgh Sports Club Open; Edinburgh, Scotland; Women : PSA 10; 16 players - $10,000 | 25–28 January | (Egypt) Nadine Shahin; 9–11, 11–13, 11–9, 14–12, 11–9 (8th PSA title) | (Egypt) Rowan Elaraby | (England) Julianne Courtice (Australia) Sarah Cardwell | (Scotland) Lisa Aitken (Egypt) Nada Abbas (Japan) Misaki Kobayashi (Scotland) Alison Thomson |
| Qatar Circuit No.6; Doha, Qatar; Men : PSA 5; 16 players - $5,000 | 30 Jan.–2 Feb. | (Kuwait) Abdullah Al-Muzayen; 11–2, 11–3, 11–2 (19th PSA title) | (India) Abhay Singh | (Spain) Iker Pajares (Germany) Yannik Omlor | (Qatar) Umair Zaman (England) Robert Downer (Qatar) Syed Azlan Amjad (Iran) Soheil Shameli |
| Malaysian Squash Tour III; Kuala Lumpur, Malaysia; Men : PSA 5; 16 players - $5,000 −−−−−− Women : PSA 5; 16 players - $5,000 | 31 Jan.–2 Feb. | (Malaysia) Mohd Syafiq Kamal; 8–11, 11–8, 11–7, 11–7 (3rd PSA title) | (Malaysia) Sanjay Singh | (Pakistan) Asim Khan (Hong Kong) Alex Lau | (Malaysia) Darren Rahul Pragasam (Malaysia) Elvinn Keo (Pakistan) Zeeshan Khan (Malaysia) Siow Yee Xian |
| Malaysian Squash Tour III; Kuala Lumpur, Malaysia; Men : PSA 5; 16 players - $5,000 −−−−−− Women : PSA 5; 16 players - $5,000 | 31 Jan.–2 Feb. | (Hong Kong) Tong Tsz Wing; 11–8, 12–14, 11–8, 3–5, ret. (7th PSA title) | (Malaysia) Andrea Lee | (Malaysia) Aifa Azman (Philippines) Jemyca Aribado | (Malaysia) Chan Yiwen (Malaysia) Nazihah Hanis (Pakistan) Sadia Gul (Malaysia) Ooi Kah Yan |

=== February ===
| Tournament | Date | Champion | Runner-Up | Semifinalists | Quarterfinalists |
|---|---|---|---|---|---|
| Suburban Collection Motor City Open; Detroit, United States; Men : PSA 70; 16 players - $70,000 - Draw | 1–4 February | (Egypt) Marwan El Shorbagy; 11–9, 9–11, 11–8, 8–11, 11–9 (8th PSA title) | (New Zealand) Paul Coll | (Switzerland) Nicolas Müller (Colombia) Miguel Ángel Rodríguez | (Egypt) Mohamed Abouelghar (Australia) Ryan Cuskelly (New Zealand) Campbell Grayson (Hong Kong) Leo Au |
| Savcor Finnish Open; Mikkeli, Finland; Men : PSA 10; 16 players - $10,000 | 1–4 February | (Finland) Olli Tuominen; 7–11, 11–9, 7–11, 11–8, 11–7 (14th PSA title) | (Belgium) Jan Van Den Herrewegen | (England) Adam Murrills (Denmark) Kristian Frost | (Czech Republic) Martin Švec (England) Charlie Lee (Austria) Aqeel Rehman (England) Jaymie Haycocks |
| Ralph's Texas Bar Open; Medicine Hat, Canada; Men : PSA 10; 16 players - $10,000 | 1–4 February | (Egypt) Youssef Soliman; 6–11, 11–8, 11–8, 11–9 (6th PSA title) | (England) George Parker | (Canada) Andrew Schnell (France) Victor Crouin | (France) Baptiste Masotti (Mexico) Alfredo Ávila (Colombia) Juan Camilo Vargas (Canada) Shawn Delierre |
| Winnipeg Winter Club Open; Winnipeg, Canada; Women : PSA 10; 16 players - $10,000 | 1–4 February | (Egypt) Nadine Shahin; 12–10, 10–12, 11–5, 11–4 (9th PSA title) | (Japan) Misaki Kobayashi | (Egypt) Menna Hamed (Egypt) Zeina Mickawy | (Hong Kong) Ho Tze-Lok (Canada) Danielle Letourneau (Canada) Nikki Todd (Mexico) Diana García |
| Cleveland Classic; Cleveland, United States; Women : PSA 50; 16 players - $50,000 - Draw | 2–5 February | (New Zealand) Joelle King; 11–8, 11–8, 11–8 (11th PSA title) | (Egypt) Raneem El Weleily | (England) Alison Waters (United States) Amanda Sobhy | (United States) Olivia Blatchford (Wales) Tesni Evans (England) Sarah-Jane Perry (England) Victoria Lust |
| EM Noll Classic; Philadelphia, United States; Men : PSA 5; 16 players - $5,000 −−−−−− Women : PSA 5; 16 players - $5,000 | 2–5 February | (England) Lyell Fuller; 11–2, 11–9, 6–2, ret. (1st PSA title) | (United States) Dylan Cunningham | (Canada) David Baillargeon (United States) Nosherwan Khan | (Scotland) John White (Finland) Henrik Mustonen (Pakistan) Syed Hamzah Bukhari (Bermuda) Micah Franklin |
| EM Noll Classic; Philadelphia, United States; Men : PSA 5; 16 players - $5,000 −−−−−− Women : PSA 5; 16 players - $5,000 | 2–5 February | (Canada) Nicole Bunyan; 11–5, 7–11, 11–7, 11–4 (1st PSA title) | (Pakistan) Maria Toorpakay Wazir | (South Africa) Elani Landman (United States) Marina Stefanoni | (India) Anaka Alankamony (Finland) Emilia Soini (Brazil) Thaisa Serafini (United States) Ryan Morgan |
| Bahl & Gaynor Cincinnati Cup; Cincinnati, United States; Women : PSA 25; 16 players - $25,000 | 7–10 February | (Australia) Donna Urquhart; 11–9, 13–11, 11–5 (11th PSA title) | (England) Victoria Lust | (Egypt) Mariam Metwally (Egypt) Rowan Elaraby | (Canada) Samantha Cornett (Japan) Misaki Kobayashi (England) Millie Tomlinson (Canada) Hollie Naughton |
| Malaysian Squash Tour IV; Kuala Lumpur, Malaysia; Men : PSA 5; 16 players - $5,000 −−−−−− Women : PSA 5; 16 players - $5,000 | 7–10 February | (Hong Kong) Tang Ming Hong; 12–14, 11–2, 11–13, 11–6, 11–3 (2nd PSA title) | (Hong Kong) Alex Lau | (Pakistan) Syed Ali Mujtaba Bokhari (Malaysia) Elvinn Keo | (Hong Kong) Henry Leung (Hong Kong) Chris Lo (Malaysia) Valentino Bong (Malaysia) Sanjay Singh |
| Malaysian Squash Tour IV; Kuala Lumpur, Malaysia; Men : PSA 5; 16 players - $5,000 −−−−−− Women : PSA 5; 16 players - $5,000 | 7–10 February | (Malaysia) Aifa Azman; 11–5, 11–7, 11–6 (2nd PSA title) | (Malaysia) Wen Li Lai | (Malaysia) Ma Si Yi (Malaysia) Chan Yiwen | (Malaysia) Kiroshanna Manoharan (Hong Kong) Ho Tze-Lok (Malaysia) Nazihah Hanis (Malaysia) Ooi Kah Yan |
| UCS Swedish Open; Linköping, Sweden; Men : PSA 70; 16 players - $70,000 - Draw | 8–11 February | (Egypt) Ali Farag; 11–7, 6–11, 11–3, 11–5 (11th PSA title) | (Germany) Simon Rösner | (New Zealand) Paul Coll (Egypt) Tarek Momen | (Australia) Cameron Pilley (Egypt) Omar Mosaad (England) Daryl Selby (England) James Willstrop |
| Vedanta Indian Open; Mumbai, India; Men : PSA 35; 16 players - $35,000 | 8–11 February | (India) Saurav Ghosal; 11–9, 5–11, 6–11, 11–7, 12–10 (8th PSA title) | (Switzerland) Nicolas Müller | (England) Chris Simpson (Scotland) Greg Lobban | (India) Mahesh Mangaonkar (India) Harinder Pal Sandhu (Egypt) Omar Abdel Meguid (Egypt) Karim Ali Fathy |
| 20th Atlanta Open; Atlanta, United States; Men : PSA 10; 16 players - $10,000 | 8–11 February | (India) Vikram Malhotra; 12–10, 11–9, 15–13 (6th PSA title) | (Egypt) Mohammed Reda | (Portugal) Rui Soares (Mexico) Edgar Zayas | (Pakistan) Shahjahan Khan (United States) Faraz Khan (Mexico) Alfredo Ávila (Canada) Michael McCue |
| Canada Cup; Toronto, Canada; Men : PSA 50; 16 players - $50,000 | 12–15 February | (Hong Kong) Max Lee; 11–7, 11–7, 5–11, 14–12 (13th PSA title) | (Australia) Ryan Cuskelly | (Qatar) Abdulla Al-Tamimi (New Zealand) Campbell Grayson | (Scotland) Alan Clyne (Peru) Diego Elías (Mexico) Arturo Salazar (Mexico) César Salazar |
| Hampshire Open; Southampton, England; Men : PSA 5; 16 players - $5,000 | 15–18 February | (Jordan) Mohammad Alsarraj; 5–11, 11–9, 6–11, 11–7, 11–6 (6th PSA title) | (Denmark) Kristian Frost | (England) Mark Fuller (England) Jaymie Haycocks | (England) Joe Green (England) Robert Downer (Republic of Ireland) Brian Byrne (England) Michael Harris |
| Guilfoyle Financial PSA Squash Classic; Toronto, Canada; Men : PSA 5; 16 players - $5,000 | 21–24 February | (Czech Republic) Daniel Mekbib; 9–11, 11–1, 11–8, 14–12 (1st PSA title) | (France) Baptiste Masotti | (Switzerland) Reiko Peter (Wales) Emyr Evans | (Finland) Henrik Mustonen (Canada) David Baillargeon (South Africa) Tristan Eysele (England) Charlie Lee |
| British Virgin Islands Open; Road Town, British Virgin Islands; Men : PSA 5; 16 players - $5,000 | 21–24 February | (United States) Christopher Gordon; 11–5, 11–6, 11–3 (5th PSA title) | (England) Adam Murrills | (England) Tom Walsh (England) Lewis Doughty | (Cayman Islands) Cameron Stafford (Guatemala) Antonio de la Torre (England) Nick Sutcliffe (United States) Jason Hua |
| Mount Royal University Open; Calgary, Canada; Men : PSA 5; 16 players - $5,000 | 22–25 February | (Canada) Michael McCue; 11–8, 12–10, 11–5 (1st PSA title) | (England) Kyle Finch | (India) Aditya Jagtap (England) Charlie Johnson | (Mexico) Eric Gálvez (Mexico) Edgar Zayas (France) Vincent Droesbeke (United States) Adrian Leanza |
| Windy City Open by the Walter Family & EquiTrust; Chicago, United States −−−−−− Men : World Series; 32 players - $250,000 - Draw Women : World Series; 32 players - $250,000 - Draw | 22–28 February | (Egypt) Mohamed El Shorbagy; 11–8, 11–8, 11–6 (31st PSA title) | (Egypt) Marwan El Shorbagy | (Egypt) Ali Farag (Egypt) Tarek Momen | (Egypt) Karim Abdel Gawad (Australia) Cameron Pilley (Colombia) Miguel Ángel Rodríguez (Germany) Simon Rösner |
| Windy City Open by the Walter Family & EquiTrust; Chicago, United States −−−−−− Men : World Series; 32 players - $250,000 - Draw Women : World Series; 32 players - $250,000 - Draw | 22–28 February | (Egypt) Nour El Tayeb; 11–8, 10–12, 11–13, 11–9, 12–10 (6th PSA title) | (New Zealand) Joelle King | (England) Sarah-Jane Perry (Egypt) Raneem El Weleily | (Egypt) Nour El Sherbini (United States) Amanda Sobhy (France) Camille Serme (England) Alison Waters |
| Bermuda Open; Devonshire, Bermuda; Men : PSA 5; 16 players - $5,000 −−−−−− Women : PSA 5; 16 players - $5,000 | 27 Feb.–2 Mar. | (England) Angus Gillams; 11–6, 11–7, 11–5 (6th PSA title) | (England) Adam Murrills | (England) Anthony Graham (England) Kyle Finch | (Finland) Henrik Mustonen (Bermuda) Noah Browne (Bermuda) Micah Franklin (United States) David Cromwell |
| Bermuda Open; Devonshire, Bermuda; Men : PSA 5; 16 players - $5,000 −−−−−− Women : PSA 5; 16 players - $5,000 | 27 Feb.–2 Mar. | (South Africa) Alexandra Fuller; 11–3, 9–11, 11–2, 11–5 (4th PSA title) | (South Africa) Milnay Louw | (Finland) Emilia Soini (Canada) Nicole Bunyan | (Canada) Nikki Todd (England) Anna Kimberley (Colombia) Catalina Peláez (South Africa) Elani Landman |
| Malaysian Squash Tour V Penang, Malaysia; Men : PSA 5; 16 players - $5,000 −−−−−− Women : PSA 5; 16 players - $5,000 | 28 Feb.–2 Mar. | (Pakistan) Tayyab Aslam; 11–6, 9–11, 11–6, 11–5 (3rd PSA title) | (Malaysia) Mohd Syafiq Kamal | (Malaysia) Sanjay Singh (Malaysia) Addeen Idrakie | (Malaysia) Darren Rahul Pragasam (Pakistan) Amaad Fareed (Malaysia) Muhammad Hannan (Pakistan) Zeeshan Khan |
| Malaysian Squash Tour V Penang, Malaysia; Men : PSA 5; 16 players - $5,000 −−−−−− Women : PSA 5; 16 players - $5,000 | 28 Feb.–2 Mar. | (Malaysia) Aifa Azman; 12–10, 8–11, 11–5, 11–3 (3rd PSA title) | (Hong Kong) Vanessa Chu | (Malaysia) Rachel Arnold (Malaysia) Nazihah Hanis | (Egypt) Hana Moataz (India) Sunayna Kuruvilla (Hong Kong) Lee Ka Yi (Malaysia) Ooi Kah Yan |
| Montréal Open; Montreal, Canada; Men : PSA 25; 16 players - $25,000 | 28 Feb.–3 Mar. | (Spain) Borja Golán; 9–11, 11–4, 11–9, 11–6 (32nd PSA title) | (Malaysia) Nafiizwan Adnan | (New Zealand) Campbell Grayson (Germany) Raphael Kandra | (France) Baptiste Masotti (United States) Todd Harrity (Egypt) Karim Ali Fathy (Mexico) Arturo Salazar |
| Wasatch Advisors Salt Lake City Open; Salt Lake City, United States; Women : PSA 15; 16 players - $15,000 | 28 Feb.–3 Mar. | (Egypt) Yathreb Adel; 11–6, 12–10, 12–10 (8th PSA title) | (Hong Kong) Joey Chan | (France) Coline Aumard (Malaysia) Sivasangari Subramaniam | (England) Julianne Courtice (New Zealand) Amanda Landers-Murphy (Canada) Danielle Letourneau (Mexico) Samantha Terán |

=== March ===
| Tournament | Date | Champion | Runner-Up | Semifinalists | Quarterfinalists |
|---|---|---|---|---|---|
| Israel Herzliya Open; Herzliya, Israel; Men : PSA 5; 16 players - $5,000 | 1–4 March | (Spain) Bernat Jaume; 10–12, 11–5, 11–3, 10–12, 11–9 (2nd PSA title) | (France) Victor Crouin | (England) Harry Falconer (Netherlands) Marc Ter Sluis | (Israel) Daniel Poleshchuk (France) Enzo Corigliano (England) Bradley Masters (Portugal) Cláudio Pinto |
| Brisbane City Squash Sandgate Open; Sandgate, Australia; Women : PSA 5; 16 players - $5,000 | 2–4 March | (Australia) Christine Nunn; 11–8, 9–11, 11–3, 11–7 (5th PSA title) | (Australia) Tamika Saxby | (New Zealand) Abbie Palmer (Australia) Jessica Turnbull | (New Zealand) Emma Millar (Australia) Taylor Flavell (Australia) Selena Shaikh (Australia) Lauren Aspinall |
| 15th Canary Wharf Classic; London, England; Men : PSA 100; 16 players - $100,000 - Draw | 5–9 March | (Egypt) Mohamed El Shorbagy; 11–8, 7–11, 12–10, 9–11, 11–3 (32nd PSA title) | (Egypt) Tarek Momen | (Egypt) Marwan El Shorbagy (Egypt) Ali Farag | (Australia) Ryan Cuskelly (England) Daryl Selby (England) James Willstrop (Germany) Simon Rösner |
| Malaysian Squash Tour VI; Kuala Lumpur, Malaysia; Men : PSA 10; 16 players - $10,000 −−−−−− Women : PSA 10; 16 players - $10,000 | 6–9 March | (Kuwait) Abdullah Al-Muzayen; 11–8, 8–11, 3–11, 11–8, 11–4 (20th PSA title) | (Australia) Rex Hedrick | (Malaysia) Ivan Yuen (Hong Kong) Chi Him Wong | (Pakistan) Tayyab Aslam (Malaysia) Sanjay Singh (Kuwait) Ammar Al-Tamimi (Malaysia) Addeen Idrakie |
| Malaysian Squash Tour VI; Kuala Lumpur, Malaysia; Men : PSA 10; 16 players - $10,000 −−−−−− Women : PSA 10; 16 players - $10,000 | 6–9 March | (Australia) Christine Nunn; 11–5, 11–6, 6–11, 11–9 (6th PSA title) | (Egypt) Hana Moataz | (Latvia) Ineta Mackeviča (Hong Kong) Liu Tsz Ling | (Australia) Tamika Saxby (Japan) Satomi Watanabe (Hong Kong) Tong Tsz Wing (Australia) Jessica Turnbull |
| The Carter Classic; Toronto, Canada; Men : PSA 10; 16 players - $10,000 | 7–10 March | (England) Charles Sharpes; 11–6, 7–11, 11–9, 7–11, 11–6 (8th PSA title) | (Argentina) Robertino Pezzota | (Canada) Shawn Delierre (Pakistan) Ahsan Ayaz | (Mexico) Mario Yáñez (Canada) Nick Sachvie (Finland) Henrik Mustonen (India) Vikram Malhotra |
| CFO Consulting Women's Squash Week; Calgary, Canada; Women : PSA 15; 16 players - $15,000 | 8–11 March | (Egypt) Mayar Hany; 11–9, 17–15, 11–8 (2nd PSA title) | (England) Fiona Moverley | (Australia) Rachael Grinham (England) Jenny Duncalf | (Canada) Danielle Letourneau (Egypt) Nadine Shahin (Canada) Nikki Todd (New Zealand) Amanda Landers-Murphy |
| TRAC Oil & Gas North of Scotland Open; Aberdeen, Scotland; Men : PSA 10; 16 players - $5,000 −−−−−− Women : PSA 5; 16 players - $5,000 | 8–11 March | (England) George Parker; 11–8, 11–3, 11–4 (6th PSA title) | (Belgium) Jan Van Den Herrewegen | (Denmark) Kristian Frost (England) Joshua Masters | (Wales) Peter Creed (Republic of Ireland) Brian Byrne (Jordan) Mohammad Alsarraj (England) Jaymie Haycocks |
| TRAC Oil & Gas North of Scotland Open; Aberdeen, Scotland; Men : PSA 10; 16 players - $5,000 −−−−−− Women : PSA 5; 16 players - $5,000 | 8–11 March | (England) Lucy Turmel; 11–8, 11–8, 11–8 (2nd PSA title) | (England) Kace Bartley | (Scotland) Lisa Aitken (Spain) Cristina Gómez | (Scotland) Georgia Adderley (India) Sachika Ingale (Finland) Riina Koskinen (Switzerland) Cindy Merlo |
| Contrex Challenge Cup; Hong Kong, China; Men : PSA 5; 16 players - $5,000 −−−−−− Women : PSA 5; 16 players - $5,000 | 8–11 March | (Spain) Carlos Cornes; 11–3, 11–5, 11–3 (4th PSA title) | (Hong Kong) Yeung Ho Wai | (Hong Kong) Alex Lau (Portugal) Rui Soares | (Philippines) Robert Andrew Garcia (Hong Kong) Chris Lo (Hong Kong) Tang Ming Hong (Netherlands) Tess Jutte |
| Contrex Challenge Cup; Hong Kong, China; Men : PSA 5; 16 players - $5,000 −−−−−− Women : PSA 5; 16 players - $5,000 | 8–11 March | (Hong Kong) Vanessa Chu; 11–9, 11–8, 13–11 (4th PSA title) | (Hong Kong) Ho Tze-Lok | (Hong Kong) Lee Ka Yi (India) Sunayna Kuruvilla | (Philippines) Jemyca Aribado (Switzerland) Nadia Pfister (Hong Kong) Chan Sin Yuk (Hong Kong) Ho Ka Wing |
| Malaysian Squash Tour VII; Kuching, Malaysia; Men : PSA 5; 16 players - $5,000 −−−−−− Women : PSA 5; 16 players - $5,000 | 14–16 March | (Egypt) Shehab Essam; 11–6, 11–7, 11–7 (3rd PSA title) | (Malaysia) Asyraf Azan | (Malaysia) Sanjay Singh (Egypt) Ahmed Hosny | (Malaysia) Darren Rahul Pragasam (Malaysia) Muhammad Ezzri Nazri (Pakistan) Shoaib Hassan (Malaysia) Ryan Pasqual |
| Malaysian Squash Tour VII; Kuching, Malaysia; Men : PSA 5; 16 players - $5,000 −−−−−− Women : PSA 5; 16 players - $5,000 | 14–16 March | (Malaysia) Aifa Azman; 15–13, 7–11, 11–6, 11–9 (4th PSA title) | (Latvia) Ineta Mackeviča | (Malaysia) Wen Li Lai (Malaysia) Ooi Kah Yan | (India) Sunayna Kuruvilla (Malaysia) Jessica Keng (Philippines) Jemyca Aribado (Malaysia) Ainaa Ampandi |
| Cronimet Open; Skellefteå, Sweden; Men : PSA 5; 16 players - $5,000 −−−−−− Women : Closed Satellite; 16 players - $1,000‡ | 14–17 March | (Spain) Edmon López; 11–5, 11–7, 11–1 (4th PSA title) | (Netherlands) Roshan Bharos | (Germany) Yannik Omlor (Czech Republic) Martin Švec | (England) Adam Murrills (Norway) Adrian Østbye (Portugal) Cláudio Pinto (England) Kyle Finch |
| Cronimet Open; Skellefteå, Sweden; Men : PSA 5; 16 players - $5,000 −−−−−− Women : Closed Satellite; 16 players - $1,000‡ | 14–17 March | (Sweden) Nanna Carleke; 11–3, 11–5, 11–3 | (Sweden) Anna Kaiding | (Sweden) Emma Gyllstad (Sweden) Elisabeth Andreasson | (Norway) Chloe Kalvø (England) Lauren Crichton (Sweden) Josefine Paulie (Sweden) Tuva Holmberg |
| Grasshopper Cup; Zürich, Switzerland; Men : PSA 100; 16 players - $100,000 - Draw | 14–18 March | (Egypt) Ramy Ashour; 11–8, 11–9, 11–6 (40th PSA title) | (Egypt) Mohamed El Shorbagy | (England) James Willstrop (France) Grégory Gaultier | (Egypt) Mohamed Abouelghar (Egypt) Karim Abdel Gawad (Germany) Simon Rösner (Egypt) Tarek Momen |
| Manitoba Open; Winnipeg, Canada; Men : PSA 15; 16 players - $15,000 | 15–18 March | (Malaysia) Nafiizwan Adnan; 11–6, 7–11, 11–6, 11–4 (11th PSA title) | (New Zealand) Campbell Grayson | (England) Charles Sharpes (Australia) Zac Alexander | (United States) Christopher Gordon (Mexico) Jesús Camacho (Pakistan) Shahjahan Khan (Jamaica) Christopher Binnie |
| Queen City Open; Regina, Canada; Women : PSA 15; 16 players - $15,000 | 15–18 March | (Egypt) Mayar Hany; 11–5, 5–11, 11–7, 14–12 (3rd PSA title) | (Egypt) Nada Abbas | (Canada) Nikki Todd (Egypt) Nadine Shahin | (Colombia) Catalina Peláez (Canada) Nicole Bunyan (Australia) Sarah Cardwell (France) Énora Villard |
| Annecy PSA Open; Seynod, France; Men : PSA 10; 16 players - $10,000 | 15–18 March | (Egypt) Mohamed ElSherbini; 11–9, 9–11, 11–6, 8–11, 11–5 (6th PSA title) | (England) Patrick Rooney | (Spain) Bernat Jaume (France) Auguste Dussourd | (France) Victor Crouin (Jordan) Mohammad Alsarraj (Germany) Valentin Rapp (France) Benjamin Aubert |
| Pure Blonde Elanora Open; Sydney, Australia; Men : PSA 5; 16 players - $5,000 | 16–18 March | (Spain) Carlos Cornes; 11–6, 12–10, 11–5 (5th PSA title) | (Japan) Ryunosuke Tsukue | (Australia) Matthew Karwalski (New Zealand) Luke Jones | (Australia) Rhys Dowling (South Korea) Hwang Joong-won (South Korea) Woo Chang-wook (Australia) Aaron Frankcomb |
| The Wimbledon Club Squared Open; London, England; Men : PSA 35; 16 players - $35,000 | 20–23 March | (France) Mathieu Castagnet; 11–6, 11–9, 11–6 (4th PSA title) | (England) Tom Richards | (Germany) Raphael Kandra (England) James Willstrop | (Egypt) Youssef Soliman (England) Daryl Selby (Wales) Joel Makin (France) Lucas Serme |
| Lagos International Squash Classic; Lagos, Nigeria; Men : PSA 15; 16 players - $15,000 −−−−−− Women : PSA 5; 16 players - $5,000 | 21–24 March | (Egypt) Karim El Hammamy; 11–9, 11–7, 10–6, ret. (2nd PSA title) | (Egypt) Ahmed Hosny | (Egypt) Mohammed Reda (England) Angus Gillams | (Egypt) Shehab Essam (Egypt) Mohamed ElSherbini (Switzerland) Dimitri Steinmann (France) Sébastien Bonmalais |
| Lagos International Squash Classic; Lagos, Nigeria; Men : PSA 15; 16 players - $15,000 −−−−−− Women : PSA 5; 16 players - $5,000 | 21–24 March | (Egypt) Salma Youssef; 11–8, 11–7, 7–11, 5–11, 9–4, ret. (1st PSA title) | (Egypt) Menna Nasser | (Nigeria) Yemisi Olatunji (Czech Republic) Eva Feřteková | (Nigeria) Udeme James (Nigeria) Abdulazeez Rofiat (Nigeria) Veronica Sunday (Nigeria) Taiwo Ebifemi |
| Novum Energy Texas Open; Houston, United States; Women : PSA 25; 16 players - $25,000 - Draw | 22–25 March | (United States) Amanda Sobhy; 11–8, 10–12, 11–6, 11–9 (14th PSA title) | (United States) Reeham Sedky | (Egypt) Nada Abbas (Egypt) Mayar Hany | (Belgium) Nele Gilis (Egypt) Hana Moataz (Egypt) Rowan Elaraby (Canada) Danielle Letourneau |
| ScotiaMcleod/Charlton & Hill Pro-Am; Lethbridge, Canada; Men : PSA 10; 16 players - $10,000 | 22–25 March | (Mexico) Leonel Cárdenas; 11–7, 11–7, 11–7 (2nd PSA title) | (England) Charles Sharpes | (Pakistan) Shahjahan Khan (Pakistan) Ahsan Ayaz | (Canada) Andrew Schnell (Canada) Tyler Osborne (Czech Republic) Ondřej Uherka (Canada) Nick Sachvie |
| Denton Associates Northern Open; Manchester, England; Women : PSA 5; 16 players - $5,000 | 22–25 March | (England) Julianne Courtice; 11–8, 11–8, 3–11, 11–6 (3rd PSA title) | (England) Rachael Chadwick | (England) Grace Gear (France) Chloé Mesic | (England) Kace Bartley (Wales) Lowri Roberts (Spain) Cristina Gómez (England) Victoria Temple-Murray |
| Subbotnik PSA Open; Moscow, Russia; Men : PSA 5; 16 players - $5,000 | 23–25 March | (Switzerland) Reiko Peter; 11–8, 11–7, 11–5 (7th PSA title) | (Brazil) Vini Rodrigues | (Finland) Jami Äijänen (Switzerland) Roman Allinckx | (France) Vincent Droesbeke (Israel) Roee Avraham (Czech Republic) Jakub Solnický (Czech Republic) Martin Švec |
| Macau Open; Macau, China; Men : PSA 50; 16 players - $50,000 - Draw −−−−−− Women : PSA 50; 16 players - $50,000 - Draw | 29 Mar.–1 Apr. | (Hong Kong) Tsz Fung Yip; 9–11, 6–11, 11–4, 11–5, 11–7 (5th PSA title) | (Egypt) Omar Mosaad | (Hong Kong) Max Lee (Hong Kong) Leo Au | (Qatar) Abdulla Al-Tamimi (Egypt) Mazen Hesham (Spain) Borja Golán (Egypt) Omar Abdel Meguid |
| Macau Open; Macau, China; Men : PSA 50; 16 players - $50,000 - Draw −−−−−− Women : PSA 50; 16 players - $50,000 - Draw | 29 Mar.–1 Apr. | (Egypt) Nouran Gohar; 11–8, 11–8, 9–11, 11–7 (6th PSA title) | (Egypt) Salma Hany | (Hong Kong) Joey Chan (Hong Kong) Annie Au | (United States) Olivia Blatchford (France) Camille Serme (Egypt) Mariam Metwally (England) Emily Whitlock |

‡: Not included in the PSA calendar.

=== April ===
| Tournament | Date | Champion | Runner-Up | Semifinalists | Quarterfinalists |
|---|---|---|---|---|---|
| Vogue Optical Atlantic Squash Championships; Charlottetown, Canada; Men : PSA 5; 16 players - $5,000 | 5–8 April | (United States) Chris Hanson; 11–6, 11–3, 11–5 (3rd PSA title) | (Mexico) Mario Yáñez | (Canada) Nick Sachvie (India) Aditya Jagtap | (Spain) Hugo Varela (Canada) Tyler Osborne (Mexico) Allan Núñez (Mexico) Fernando Magdaleno |
| Richmond Open; Richmond, United States; Women : PSA 10; 16 players - $10,000 | 11–14 April | (United States) Reeham Sedky; 12–10, 5–11, 11–6, 11–2 (1st PSA title) | (Egypt) Rowan Elaraby | (United States) Marina Stefanoni (England) Anna Kimberley | (Latvia) Ineta Mackeviča (Colombia) Catalina Peláez (French Guiana) Mélissa Alves (Canada) Nicole Bunyan |
| Hazlow Electronics Rochester ProAm; Rochester, United States; Men : PSA 5; 16 players - $5,000 | 12–15 April | (Mexico) Mario Yáñez; 17–15, 3–0, ret. (1st PSA title) | (Spain) Bernat Jaume | (England) Angus Gillams (United States) Faraz Khan | (England) Mark Fuller (England) Anthony Graham (Pakistan) Syed Hamzah Bukhari (Mexico) Leonel Cárdenas |
| Assore & Balwin Gauteng Open; Johannesburg, South Africa; Men : PSA 5; 16 players - $5,000 −−−−−− Women : PSA 5; 16 players - $5,000 | 17–20 April | (South Africa) Jean-Pierre Brits; 7–11, 11–7, 11–5, 11–8 (1st PSA title) | (Czech Republic) Martin Švec | (Egypt) Karim Magdy (South Africa) Christo Potgieter | (South Africa) Wayne Sithole (England) Stuart MacGregor (India) Abhay Singh (South Africa) Dylan Groenewald |
| Assore & Balwin Gauteng Open; Johannesburg, South Africa; Men : PSA 5; 16 players - $5,000 −−−−−− Women : PSA 5; 16 players - $5,000 | 17–20 April | (South Africa) Alexandra Fuller; 11–6, 11–5, 11–7 (5th PSA title) | (South Africa) Milnay Louw | (South Africa) Cheyna Tucker (Egypt) Salma Youssef | (South Africa) Adel Sammons (South Africa) Alexa Pienaar (Guatemala) Winifer Bonilla (England) Amy Jones |
| Garavan's West of Ireland Open (Republic of Ireland) Galway, Ireland; Men : PSA 10; 16 players - $10,000 | 18–21 April | (England) George Parker; 11–9, 11–5, 3–11, 11–8 (7th PSA title) | (England) Charlie Lee | (England) Charles Sharpes (Canada) Nick Sachvie | (Czech Republic) Daniel Mekbib (France) Auguste Dussourd (England) Patrick Rooney (Canada) David Baillargeon |
| Guatemala 5K Open I Guatemala City, Guatemala; Men : PSA 5; 16 players - $5,000 | 18–21 April | (Guatemala) Josué Enríquez; 11–8, 12–10, 6–11, 11–7 (1st PSA title) | (Mexico) Leonel Cárdenas | (Mexico) Juan G. Domínguez (Mexico) Allan Núñez | (Canada) James Van Staveren (Guatemala) Alejandro Enríquez (England) Nick Sutcliffe (Mexico) Miled Zarazúa |
| Madison Open; Madison, United States; Men : PSA 5; 16 players - $5,000 | 19–22 April | (India) Velavan Senthilkumar; 7–11, 13–11, 12–10, 11–4 (1st PSA title) | (South Africa) Tristan Eysele | (England) Reuben Phillips (India) Aditya Jagtap | (England) Mark Fuller (United States) Andrew Douglas (Spain) Hugo Varela (England) Anthony Graham |
| El Gouna International; El Gouna, Egypt; Men : World Series; 32 players - $165,000 - Draw −−−−−− Women : World Series; 32 players - $165,000 - Draw | 20–27 April | (Egypt) Marwan El Shorbagy; 11–8, 11–5, 11–4 (9th PSA title) | (Egypt) Ali Farag | (France) Grégory Gaultier (Egypt) Mohamed El Shorbagy | (Colombia) Miguel Ángel Rodríguez (Germany) Simon Rösner (Egypt) Karim Abdel Gawad (Egypt) Tarek Momen |
| El Gouna International; El Gouna, Egypt; Men : World Series; 32 players - $165,000 - Draw −−−−−− Women : World Series; 32 players - $165,000 - Draw | 20–27 April | (Egypt) Raneem El Weleily; 5–11, 11–8, 11–3, 14–12 (17th PSA title) | (Egypt) Nour El Sherbini | (Egypt) Nour El Tayeb (England) Laura Massaro | (England) Alison Waters (Hong Kong) Annie Au (France) Camille Serme (India) Joshna Chinappa |
| Keith Grainger Memorial UCT Open; Cape Town, South Africa; Men : PSA 5; 16 players - $5,000 −−−−−− Women : PSA 5; 16 players - $5,000 | 24–27 April | (Czech Republic) Martin Švec; 11–7, 11–5, 12–14, 12–10 (1st PSA title) | (India) Abhay Singh | (England) Stuart MacGregor (South Africa) Christo Potgieter | (Czech Republic) Ondřej Uherka (England) Kyle Finch (South Africa) Gary Wheadon (United States) Adrian Leanza |
| Keith Grainger Memorial UCT Open; Cape Town, South Africa; Men : PSA 5; 16 players - $5,000 −−−−−− Women : PSA 5; 16 players - $5,000 | 24–27 April | (South Africa) Alexandra Fuller; 11–5, 11–9, 11–8 (6th PSA title) | (South Africa) Milnay Louw | (South Africa) Cheyna Tucker (Malaysia) Nazihah Hanis | (Guatemala) Winifer Bonilla (South Africa) Katie Mayhew (Egypt) Salma Youssef (South Africa) Makgosi Peloakgosi |
| Irish Squash Open (Republic of Ireland) Dublin, Ireland; Men : PSA 15; 16 players - $15,000 −−−−−− Women : PSA 15; 16 players - $15,000 | 25–28 April | (England) Tom Richards; 6–11, 11–3, 11–5, 11–7 (6th PSA title) | (England) Richie Fallows | (Wales) Joel Makin (England) Ben Coleman | (France) Lucas Serme (England) George Parker (Réunion) Sébastien Bonmalais (England) Joshua Masters |
| Irish Squash Open (Republic of Ireland) Dublin, Ireland; Men : PSA 15; 16 players - $15,000 −−−−−− Women : PSA 15; 16 players - $15,000 | 25–28 April | (Egypt) Rowan Elaraby; 11–3, 12–10, 12–10 (5th PSA title) | (Egypt) Zeina Mickawy | (England) Fiona Moverley (New Zealand) Amanda Landers-Murphy | (Belgium) Tinne Gilis (Malaysia) Rachel Arnold (Mexico) Samantha Terán (England) Rachael Chadwick |
| Pilatus Indoors Sekisui Open; Kriens, Switzerland; Men : PSA 10; 16 players - $10,000 −−−−−− Women : PSA 10; 16 players - $10,000 | 25–28 April | (Spain) Edmon López; 11–9, 8–11, 11–4, 11–3 (5th PSA title) | (Egypt) Mohammed Reda | (Switzerland) Reiko Peter (Denmark) Kristian Frost | (France) Benjamin Aubert (Egypt) Mazen Gamal (Finland) Matias Tuomi (Wales) Emyr Evans |
| Pilatus Indoors Sekisui Open; Kriens, Switzerland; Men : PSA 10; 16 players - $10,000 −−−−−− Women : PSA 10; 16 players - $10,000 | 25–28 April | (England) Millie Tomlinson; 7–11, 11–6, 11–9, 5–11, 11–7 (13th PSA title) | (England) Julianne Courtice | (Egypt) Hana Ramadan (Australia) Sarah Cardwell | (Spain) Cristina Gómez (France) Énora Villard (England) Lucy Turmel (England) Alicia Mead |
| Villa La Angostura Open; Villa La Angostura, Argentina; Men : PSA 5; 16 players - $5,000 | 25–28 April | (Argentina) Robertino Pezzota; 12–10, 11–8, 11–2 (9th PSA title) | (Colombia) Edgar Ramírez | (Chile) Rafael Allendes (Argentina) Rodrigo Obregón | (Argentina) Rodrigo Pezzota (Argentina) Ignacio G. Keen (Brazil) Diego Gobbi (Argentina) Daniel Lomaglio |

=== May ===
| Tournament | Date | Champion | Runner-Up | Semifinalists | Quarterfinalists |
|---|---|---|---|---|---|
| Abu Dhabi Open; Abu Dhabi, United Arab Emirates; Men : PSA 10; 16 players - $10,000 | 2–5 May | (India) Ramit Tandon; 11–6, 6–11, 11–3, 11–2 (3rd PSA title) | (Egypt) Omar Abdel Meguid | (Egypt) Shehab Essam (Pakistan) Tayyab Aslam | (Egypt) Mazen Gamal (Kuwait) Ammar Al-Tamimi (Pakistan) Asim Khan (England) Robert Downer |
| Mar del Plata Open; Mar del Plata, Argentina; Men : PSA 10; 16 players - $10,000 | 2–5 May | (Egypt) Mostafa Asal; 11–6, 11–7, 11–4 (1st PSA title) | (Argentina) Robertino Pezzota | (Brazil) Diego Gobbi (Argentina) Leandro Romiglio | (Argentina) Ignacio G Keen (Argentina) Rodrigo Pezzota (France) Vincent Droesbeke (Colombia) Edgar Ramírez |
| CAC Squash Open; Sandy Springs, United States; Men : PSA 15; 16 players - $15,000 −−−−−− Women : PSA 15; 16 players - $15,000 | 3–6 May | (United States) Chris Hanson; 11–6, 11–9, 9–11, 11–9 (4th PSA title) | (United States) Todd Harrity | (Mexico) Jesús Camacho (Egypt) Ahmed Hosny | (India) Mahesh Mangaonkar (England) Joshua Masters (England) Richie Fallows (Jamaica) Christopher Binnie |
| CAC Squash Open; Sandy Springs, United States; Men : PSA 15; 16 players - $15,000 −−−−−− Women : PSA 15; 16 players - $15,000 | 3–6 May | (England) Emily Whitlock; 11–9, 11–9, 11–7 (16th PSA title) | (England) Millie Tomlinson | (Hong Kong) Ho Tze-Lok (United States) Haley Mendez | (Latvia) Ineta Mackeviča (England) Lucy Turmel (Mexico) Diana García (England) Anna Kimberley |
| Alucom ACT Open; Canberra, Australia; Men : PSA 10; 16 players - $10,000 −−−−−− Women : Closed Satellite; 16 players - $1,000‡ | 3–6 May | (Australia) Rex Hedrick; 11–5, 11–5, 11–3 (12th PSA title) | (Malaysia) Addeen Idrakie | (New Zealand) Evan Williams (Hong Kong) Henry Leung | (Hong Kong) Chi Him Wong (Australia) Joshua Larkin (Australia) Rhys Dowling (Hong Kong) Tang Ming Hong |
| Alucom ACT Open; Canberra, Australia; Men : PSA 10; 16 players - $10,000 −−−−−− Women : Closed Satellite; 16 players - $1,000‡ | 3–6 May | (Australia) Toni Maxfield | (Australia) Kiara Chen | | |
| Hyder Trophy; New York City, United States; Men : PSA 5; 16 players - $5,000 | 3–6 May | (Mexico) Alfredo Ávila; 11–6, 12–10, 11–1 (9th PSA title) | (Botswana) Alister Walker | (Australia) Zac Alexander (Guatemala) Josué Enríquez | (United States) Spencer Lovejoy (United States) Andrew Douglas (Spain) Hugo Varela (Australia) Joseph White |
| Chamberlain Squash Open; Lagos, Nigeria; Men : PSA 25; 16 players - $25,000 −−−−−− Women : PSA 10; 16 players - $10,000 | 9–12 May | (Egypt) Zahed Salem; 11–7, 11–5, 11–4 (5th PSA title) | (Egypt) Youssef Soliman | (Egypt) Karim Ali Fathy (Egypt) Mohammed Reda | (Egypt) Omar Abdel Meguid (France) Sébastien Bonmalais (Egypt) Karim El Hammamy (Egypt) Mazen Gamal |
| Chamberlain Squash Open; Lagos, Nigeria; Men : PSA 25; 16 players - $25,000 −−−−−− Women : PSA 10; 16 players - $10,000 | 9–12 May | (England) Millie Tomlinson; 11–4, 13–11, 11–7 (14th PSA title) | (Egypt) Menna Hamed | (France) Énora Villard (Egypt) Salma Youssef | (Egypt) Farah Momen (Iran) Taba Taghavi (Egypt) Nadeen Kotb (Switzerland) Cindy Merlo |
| NT Open; Darwin, Australia; Men : PSA 5; 16 players - $5,000 −−−−−− Women : PSA 10; 16 players - $10,000 | 9–12 May | (Hong Kong) Alex Lau; 11–8, 11–7, 11–13, 17–15 (3rd PSA title) | (Australia) Rhys Dowling | (Australia) Joshua Larkin (Malaysia) Darren Rahul Pragasam | (Hong Kong) Chris Lo (New Zealand) Luke Jones (Australia) Thomas Calvert (Australia) Alex Eustace |
| NT Open; Darwin, Australia; Men : PSA 5; 16 players - $5,000 −−−−−− Women : PSA 10; 16 players - $10,000 | 9–12 May | (Australia) Christine Nunn; 11–9, 11–8, 6–11, 11–4 (7th PSA title) | (Australia) Rachael Grinham | (Hong Kong) Lee Ka Yi (Japan) Satomi Watanabe | (Hong Kong) Vanessa Chu (Malaysia) Aifa Azman (Malaysia) Wen Li Lai (Australia) Jessica Turnbull |
| Rhiwbina Welsh Open; Cardiff, Wales; Men : PSA 10; 16 players - $10,000 | 9–12 May | (England) Richie Fallows; 11–4, 11–2, 11–9 (4th PSA title) | (Wales) Peter Creed | (England) Patrick Rooney (England) George Parker | (Malaysia) Mohd Syafiq Kamal (Pakistan) Ahsan Ayaz (Kuwait) Ammar Al-Tamimi (England) Lyell Fuller |
| Regatas Resistencia Open; Resistencia, Argentina; Men : PSA 10; 16 players - $10,000 | 9–12 May | (Egypt) Mostafa Asal; 11–4, 11–6, 6–11, 11–3 (2nd PSA title) | (Switzerland) Dimitri Steinmann | (United States) Dylan Cunningham (Mexico) Leonel Cárdenas | (Mexico) Alfredo Ávila (France) Vincent Droesbeke (Czech Republic) Martin Švec (Argentina) Robertino Pezzota |
| Hasta La Vista Open; Wrocław, Poland; Men : PSA 5; 16 players - $5,000 | 9–12 May | (France) Victor Crouin; 11–4, 11–2, 11–6 (3rd PSA title) | (France) Benjamin Aubert | (France) Enzo Corigliano (Czech Republic) Viktor Byrtus | (Spain) Pascal Gómez (Scotland) Rory Stewart (Israel) Daniel Poleshchuk (England) Nick Mulvey |
| CityView Squash Open; Long Island, NY, United States; Men : PSA 5; 16 players - $5,000 | 9–12 May | (India) Aditya Jagtap; 11–8, 11–5, 11–6 (1st PSA title) | (Botswana) Alister Walker | (Spain) Hugo Varela (Egypt) Mustafa Nawar | (United States) Spencer Lovejoy (United States) Andrew Douglas (Mexico) Juan G Domínguez (United States) Faraz Khan |
| Pakistan Squash Circuit I Islamabad, Pakistan; Men : PSA 10; 16 players - $10,000 −−−−−− Women : PSA 5; 16 players - $5,000 | 10–13 May | (Pakistan) Farhan Mehboob; 11–7, 11–7, 5–11, 11–4 (9th PSA title) | (Pakistan) Israr Ahmed | (Pakistan) Amaad Fareed (Pakistan) Farhan Zaman | (Pakistan) Zahir Shah (Pakistan) Danish Atlas Khan (Pakistan) Asim Khan (Pakistan) Tayyab Aslam |
| Pakistan Squash Circuit I Islamabad, Pakistan; Men : PSA 10; 16 players - $10,000 −−−−−− Women : PSA 5; 16 players - $5,000 | 10–13 May | (Pakistan) Faiza Zafar; 11–7, 15–13, 9–11, 11–6 (1st PSA title) | (Pakistan) Madina Zafar | (Pakistan) Amna Fayyaz (Pakistan) Zoya Khalid | (Pakistan) Riffat Khan (Pakistan) Noor-ul-Huda (Pakistan) Noor-ul-Ain Ejaz (Pakistan) Moqaddas Ashraf |
| Paraguay Open; Asunción, Paraguay; Men : PSA 10; 16 players - $10,000 | 16–19 May | (Mexico) Alfredo Ávila; 7–11, 11–7, 11–3, 11–3 (10th PSA title) | (France) Auguste Dussourd | (Argentina) Robertino Pezzota (Finland) Olli Tuominen | (Canada) David Baillargeon (Guatemala) Josué Enríquez (Canada) Nick Sachvie (Egypt) Mostafa Asal |
| Vitesse Stortford Classic; Bishop's Stortford, England; Men : PSA 5; 16 players - $5,000 | 16–19 May | (England) Patrick Rooney; 11–7, 11–6, 11–8 (2nd PSA title) | (England) Charlie Lee | (Scotland) Rory Stewart (Pakistan) Ahsan Ayaz | (Pakistan) Shahjahan Khan (England) Nick Mulvey (England) Michael Harris (England) Jaymie Haycocks |
| Allam British Open; Hull, England; Men : World Series; 32 players - $165,000 - Draw −−−−−− Women : World Series; 32 players - $165,000 - Draw | 15–20 May | (Colombia) Miguel Ángel Rodríguez; 11–7, 6–11, 8–11, 11–2, 11–9 (27th PSA title) | (Egypt) Mohamed El Shorbagy | (France) Grégory Gaultier (Germany) Raphael Kandra | (New Zealand) Paul Coll (Germany) Simon Rösner (Egypt) Marwan El Shorbagy (Egypt) Ali Farag |
| Allam British Open; Hull, England; Men : World Series; 32 players - $165,000 - Draw −−−−−− Women : World Series; 32 players - $165,000 - Draw | 15–20 May | (Egypt) Nour El Sherbini; 11–6, 11–9, 14–12 (16th PSA title) | (Egypt) Raneem El Weleily | (England) Laura Massaro (France) Camille Serme | (Wales) Tesni Evans (England) Alison Waters (England) Sarah-Jane Perry (Egypt) Nour El Tayeb |
| Christchurch Veterinary Surgery Ipswich Open; Ipswich, England; Women : PSA 5; 16 players - $5,000 | 17–20 May | (South Africa) Alexandra Fuller; 11–7, 11–5, 11–6 (7th PSA title) | (England) Lucy Turmel | (Spain) Cristina Gómez (Scotland) Alison Thomson | (Netherlands) Tessa ter Sluis (England) Rachael Chadwick (England) Kace Bartley (England) Lucie Beecroft |
| XI Torneo Internacional PSA Sporta; Santa Catarina Pinula, Guatemala; Men : PSA 50; 16 players - $50,000 - Draw | 23–26 May | (Colombia) Miguel Ángel Rodríguez; 11–7, 11–5, 11–6 (28th PSA title) | (Peru) Diego Elías | (New Zealand) Paul Coll (Mexico) Arturo Salazar | (Egypt) Mohamed Abouelghar (Egypt) Zahed Mohamed (Malaysia) Eain Yow (Mexico) César Salazar |
| Arnold Homes Tring Open; Tring, England; Men : PSA 15; 16 players - $15,000 | 23–26 May | (Wales) Joel Makin; 11–4, 11–5, 11–3 (3rd PSA title) | (Wales) Peter Creed | (England) Adrian Waller (Egypt) Youssef Soliman | (India) Mahesh Mangaonkar (Spain) Bernat Jaume (India) Ramit Tandon (England) George Parker |
| Paineiras Open Brasil; São Paulo, Brazil; Men : PSA 10; 16 players - $10,000 | 24–27 May | (Egypt) Mostafa Asal; 11–9, 11–6, 11–7 (3rd PSA title) | (France) Victor Crouin | (Switzerland) Reiko Peter (Canada) Nick Sachvie | (United States) Dylan Cunningham (Colombia) Juan Camilo Vargas (Czech Republic) Martin Švec (England) Alex Ingham |
| CourtTech Women's PSA Classic; Auckland, New Zealand; Women : PSA 5; 16 players - $5,000 | 24–27 May | (Australia) Christine Nunn; 11–9, 11–4, 11–7 (8th PSA title) | (New Zealand) Kaitlyn Watts | (Philippines) Jemyca Aribado (New Zealand) Abbie Palmer | (Hong Kong) Vanessa Chu (Singapore) Wai Yhann Au Yeong (New Zealand) Emma Millar (New Zealand) Anika Jackson |
| Open International des Volcans; Clermont-Ferrand, France; Women : PSA 5; 16 players - $5,000 | 25–27 May | (South Africa) Alexandra Fuller; 11–4, 11–8, 11–6 (8th PSA title) | (England) Lucy Turmel | (England) Rachael Chadwick (Netherlands) Tessa ter Sluis | (Spain) Cristina Gómez (France) Chloé Mesic (England) Grace Gear (Finland) Riina Koskinen |

‡: Not included in the PSA calendar. (Played in a round-robin format).

=== June ===
| Tournament | Date | Champion | Runner-Up | Semifinalists | Quarterfinalists |
|---|---|---|---|---|---|
| City of Kalgoorlie & Boulder Golden Open; Kalgoorlie, Australia; Men : PSA 5; 16 players - $5,000 −−−−−− Women : PSA 5; 16 players - $5,000 | 2–4 June | (Malaysia) Addeen Idrakie; 7–11, 11–5, 12–10, 11–5 (4th PSA title) | (Malaysia) Darren Rahul Pragasam | (Malaysia) Bryan Lim Tze Kang (Australia) Thomas Calvert | (Australia) Mike Corren (Malaysia) Ong Sai Hung (Australia) Alex Eustace (Australia) David Ilich |
| City of Kalgoorlie & Boulder Golden Open; Kalgoorlie, Australia; Men : PSA 5; 16 players - $5,000 −−−−−− Women : PSA 5; 16 players - $5,000 | 2–4 June | (Australia) Jessica Turnbull; 11–9, 11–8, 9–11, 11–4 (1st PSA title) | (Malaysia) Wen Li Lai | (Australia) Sarah Cardwell (Australia) Tamika Saxby | (Malaysia) Aika Azman (Malaysia) Angie Ooi (Australia) Challen Stowell (Australia) Taylor Flavell |
| ATCO PSA Dubai World Series Finals; Dubai, United Arab Emirates; Men : World Series Finals; 8 players - $160,000 - Draw −−−−−− Women : World Series Finals; 8 players - $160,000 - Draw | 5–9 June | (Egypt) Mohamed El Shorbagy; 9–11, 11–3, 11–9, 11–8 (33rd PSA title) | (Egypt) Ali Farag | (Germany) Simon Rösner (England) Nick Matthew | (Egypt) Tarek Momen (Egypt) Karim Abdel Gawad (Colombia) Miguel Ángel Rodríguez (France) Grégory Gaultier |
| ATCO PSA Dubai World Series Finals; Dubai, United Arab Emirates; Men : World Series Finals; 8 players - $160,000 - Draw −−−−−− Women : World Series Finals; 8 players - $160,000 - Draw | 5–9 June | (Egypt) Nour El Sherbini; 11–5, 9–11, 11–8, 11–5 (17th PSA title) | (Egypt) Raneem El Weleily | (France) Camille Serme (Egypt) Nour El Tayeb | (England) Laura Massaro (New Zealand) Joelle King (England) Sarah-Jane Perry (Egypt) Nouran Gohar |
| Austrian Open; Salzburg, Austria; Men : PSA 5; 16 players - $5,000 | 6–9 June | (England) Lyell Fuller; 12–10, 11–1, 11–6 (2nd PSA title) | (Wales) Emyr Evans | (Republic of Ireland) Brian Byrne (Scotland) Rory Stewart | (Brazil) Vini Rodrigues (Egypt) Ahmed Hosny (United States) Spencer Lovejoy (Austria) Aqeel Rehman |
| SquashGym International Squash Classic; Palmerston North, New Zealand; Men : PSA 10; 16 players - $10,000 −−−−−− Women : PSA 5; 16 players - $5,000 | 7–10 June | (Malaysia) Ivan Yuen; 8–11, 7–11, 11–8, 7–11 (7th PSA title) | (India) Harinder Pal Sandhu | (Australia) Joshua Larkin (Malaysia) Mohd Syafiq Kamal | (New Zealand) Evan Williams (Malaysia) Addeen Idrakie (Belgium) Joeri Hapers (Australia) Rhys Dowling |
| SquashGym International Squash Classic; Palmerston North, New Zealand; Men : PSA 10; 16 players - $10,000 −−−−−− Women : PSA 5; 16 players - $5,000 | 7–10 June | (Philippines) Jemyca Aribado; 11–9, 6–11, 11–7, 12–10 (1st PSA title) | (New Zealand) Emma Millar | (Australia) Sarah Cardwell (Australia) Jessica Turnbull | (New Zealand) Abbie Palmer (Singapore) Wai Yhann Au Yeong (Singapore) Sneha Sivakumar (New Zealand) Anika Jackson |
| BTMI Barbados Open; Bridgetown, Barbados; Men : PSA 5; 16 players - $5,000 | 20–23 June | (United States) Andrew Douglas; 11–7, 12–10, 11–9 (1st PSA title) | (United States) Spencer Lovejoy | (Portugal) Rui Soares (Australia) Zac Alexander | (England) Lyell Fuller (Bermuda) Micah Franklin (British Virgin Islands) Joe Chapman (Trinidad and Tobago) Kale Wilson |
| ILT-Community Trust NZ Southern Open; Invercargill, New Zealand; Men : PSA 10; 16 players - $10,000 | 21–24 June | (Malaysia) Ivan Yuen; 11–7, 7–11, 13–11, 11–8 (8th PSA title) | (Australia) Rex Hedrick | (England) Angus Gillams (Australia) Joshua Larkin | (France) Victor Crouin (New Zealand) Evan Williams (Australia) Rhys Dowling (Malaysia) Addeen Idrakie |
| Karakal Bangor Classic; Bangor, Wales; Women : PSA 5; 16 players - $5,000 | 21–24 June | (Scotland) Lisa Aitken; 11–7, 11–1, 11–4 (3rd PSA title) | (England) Lucy Beecroft | (France) Énora Villard (England) Grace Gear | (Spain) Cristina Gómez (England) Rachael Chadwick (Wales) Ali Hemingway (France) Chloé Mesic |
| Grand Sport Armenian 3rd Challenger; Yerevan, Armenia; Men : PSA 5; 16 players - $5,000 | 24–27 June | (Egypt) Youssef Ibrahim; 11–3, 11–5, 4–11, 11–5 (2nd PSA title) | (Wales) Emyr Evans | (Germany) Yannik Omlor (Wales) Owain Taylor | (England) Taminder Gata-Aura (Switzerland) Robin Gadola (Germany) Valentin Rapp (Egypt) Khaled Labib |
| SNGPL Pakistan Squash Circuit II; Lahore, Pakistan; Men : PSA 10; 16 players - $10,000 −−−−−− Women : PSA 5; 16 players - $5,000 | 27–30 June | (Pakistan) Farhan Mehboob; 13–11, 1–11, 4–11, 13–11, 11–3 (10th PSA title) | (Pakistan) Tayyab Aslam | (Pakistan) Ahsan Ayaz (Pakistan) Farhan Zaman | (Pakistan) Asim Khan (Pakistan) Amaad Fareed (Qatar) Syed Azlan Amjad (Pakistan) Kashif Asif |
| SNGPL Pakistan Squash Circuit II; Lahore, Pakistan; Men : PSA 10; 16 players - $10,000 −−−−−− Women : PSA 5; 16 players - $5,000 | 27–30 June | (Pakistan) Madina Zafar; 11–4, 11–7, 11–8 (1st PSA title) | (Pakistan) Faiza Zafar | (Pakistan) Riffat Khan (Pakistan) Saima Shoukat | (Pakistan) Zoya Khalid (Pakistan) Noor-ul-Huda (Pakistan) Zahab Kamal Khan (Pakistan) Noorena Shams |
| Gibraltar Open; Gibraltar; Men : PSA 5; 16 players - $5,000 | 29–30 June | (Austria) Aqeel Rehman; 11–5, 11–4, 10–12, 11–3 (9th PSA title) | (Germany) Valentin Rapp | (England) Adam Auckland (Spain) Carlos Cornes | (Czech Republic) Daniel Mekbib (England) Miles Jenkins (England) Nick Mulvey (Canada) Michael McCue |
| SquashXL Open; Auckland, New Zealand; Men : PSA 10; 16 players - $10,000 | 28 Jun.–1 Jul. | (England) Angus Gillams; 11–5, 11–4, 6–11, 11–3 (7th PSA title) | (France) Victor Crouin | (New Zealand) Evan Williams (Australia) Joshua Larkin | (Republic of Ireland) Sean Conroy (Australia) Rex Hedrick (Malaysia) Darren Rahul Pragasam (India) Velavan Senthilkumar |

=== July ===
| Tournament | Date | Champion | Runner-Up | Semifinalists | Quarterfinalists |
|---|---|---|---|---|---|
| Tournament of Pyramides; Le Port-Marly, France; Women : PSA 15; 16 players - $15,000 | 3–6 July | (England) Millie Tomlinson; 8–11, 11–7, 12–10, 11–8 (15th PSA title) | (Egypt) Hana Ramadan | (Scotland) Lisa Aitken (France) Coline Aumard | (England) Julianne Courtice (Egypt) Zeina Mickawy (France) Énora Villard (Belgium) Tinne Gilis |
| Guatemala 5K Open II; Guatemala City, Guatemala; Men : PSA 5; 16 players - $5,000‡ | 4–7 July | (Mexico) Leonel Cárdenas; 11–6, 7–11, 11–3, 11–3 (3rd PSA title) | (Guatemala) Josué Enríquez | (Réunion) Christophe André (Mexico) Allan Núñez | (Mexico) Juan G Domínguez (Mexico) Alejandro Reyes (Paraguay) Francesco Marcantonio (Guatemala) Antonio de la Torre |
| South Australian Open; Adelaide, Australia; Men : PSA 5; 16 players - $5,000 −−−−−− Women : PSA 5; 16 players - $5,000 | 6–8 July | (Australia) Joshua Larkin; 11–8, 11–8, 11–9 (7th PSA title) | (Australia) Rhys Dowling | (France) Enzo Corigliano (Japan) Tomotaka Endo | (Republic of Ireland) Sean Conroy (New Zealand) Luke Jones (Australia) Alex Eustace (Australia) Thomas Calvert |
| South Australian Open; Adelaide, Australia; Men : PSA 5; 16 players - $5,000 −−−−−− Women : PSA 5; 16 players - $5,000 | 6–8 July | (Hong Kong) Vanessa Chu; 16–14, 11–0, 11–3 (5th PSA title) | (Australia) Tamika Saxby | (Australia) Sarah Cardwell (Malta) Colette Sultana | (Australia) Taylor Flavell (Australia) Zoe Petrovansky (Australia) Selena Shaikh (Australia) Lauren Aspinall |
| Jubilee Insurance Pakistan Squash Circuit III; Karachi, Pakistan; Men : PSA 10; 16 players - $10,000 −−−−−− Women : PSA 5; 16 players - $5,000 | 8–11 July | (Pakistan) Tayyab Aslam; 11–8, 10–12, 11–1, 11–8 (4th PSA title) | (Pakistan) Farhan Zaman | (Pakistan) Israr Ahmed (Pakistan) Farhan Mehboob | (Pakistan) Danish Atlas Khan (Pakistan) Amaad Fareed (Pakistan) Asim Khan (Pakistan) Syed Ali Mujtaba Bokhari |
| Jubilee Insurance Pakistan Squash Circuit III; Karachi, Pakistan; Men : PSA 10; 16 players - $10,000 −−−−−− Women : PSA 5; 16 players - $5,000 | 8–11 July | (Pakistan) Faiza Zafar; 11–7, 11–9, 11–13, 16–14 (2nd PSA title) | (Pakistan) Madina Zafar | (Pakistan) Riffat Khan (Pakistan) Komal Khan | (Pakistan) Moqaddas Ashraf (Pakistan) Zahab Kamal Khan (Pakistan) Anam Mustafa Aziz (Pakistan) Amna Fayyaz |
| City of Greater Bendigo International; Bendigo, Australia; Men : PSA 5; 16 players - $5,000 −−−−−− Women : PSA 5; 16 players - $5,000 | 12–15 July | (Republic of Ireland) Sean Conroy; 5–11, 11–9, 11–13, 11–8, 11–9 (1st PSA title) | (France) Enzo Corigliano | (Australia) Sam Ejtemai (Hong Kong) Matthew Lai | (Japan) Tomotaka Endo (South Korea) Lee In-woo (United States) Alvin Heumann (South Korea) Jo Young-hun |
| City of Greater Bendigo International; Bendigo, Australia; Men : PSA 5; 16 players - $5,000 −−−−−− Women : PSA 5; 16 players - $5,000 | 12–15 July | (Australia) Christine Nunn; 14–12, 11–7, 11–6 (9th PSA title) | (Australia) Sarah Cardwell | (Australia) Selena Shaikh (Australia) Taylor Flavell | (Malta) Colette Sultana (Australia) Zoe Petrovansky (Australia) Shehana Vithana (Australia) Maria Kalafatis |
| Malaysian Open; Kuala Lumpur, Malaysia; Men : PSA 35; 16 players - $35,000 −−−−−− Women : PSA 15; 16 players - $15,000 | 19–22 July | (Qatar) Abdulla Al-Tamimi; 5–11, 12–10, 11–1, 7–11, 11–5 (5th PSA title) | (Hong Kong) Tsz Fung Yip | (Hong Kong) Leo Au (France) Lucas Serme | (Wales) Joel Makin (India) Mahesh Mangaonkar (Malaysia) Nafiizwan Adnan (Malaysia) Eain Yow |
| Malaysian Open; Kuala Lumpur, Malaysia; Men : PSA 35; 16 players - $35,000 −−−−−− Women : PSA 15; 16 players - $15,000 | 19–22 July | (Malaysia) Low Wee Wern; 11–8, 11–7, 11–4 (6th PSA title) | (Japan) Satomi Watanabe | (Malaysia) Sivasangari Subramaniam (Egypt) Omneya Abdel Kawy | (Hong Kong) Liu Tsz Ling (Hong Kong) Ho Tze-Lok (Hong Kong) Lee Ka Yi (South Africa) Alexandra Fuller |
| City Of Devonport Tasmanian Open; Devonport, Australia; Women : PSA 10; 16 players - $10,000 | 27–29 July | (Malaysia) Low Wee Wern; 11–6, 11–7, 12–10 (7th PSA title) | (Australia) Rachael Grinham | (Egypt) Hana Ramadan (New Zealand) Abbie Palmer | (Hong Kong) Lee Ka Yi (Malaysia) Wen Li Lai (Australia) Jessica Turnbull (Australia) Tamika Saxby |

‡Although listed on PSA website as a both men's/women's tournament, women's draw was not played due to low number of registered players.

== Statistical information ==
The players/nations are sorted by:

1. Total number of titles;
2. Cumulated importance of those titles;
3. Alphabetical order (by family names for players).

=== Key ===
World Championship
World Series
PSA 100
PSA 70
PSA 5/10/15/25/35/50

=== Titles won by player (men's) ===
| Total | Player | World Ch. | World Series | 100 | 70 | 50 | 35 | 25 | 15 | 10 | 5 |
|---|---|---|---|---|---|---|---|---|---|---|---|
| 8 | Mohamed El Shorbagy (EGY) | ● | ●●●● | ●●● | | | | | | | |
| 4 | Edmon López (ESP) | | | | | | | | | ●● | ●● |
| 3 | Marwan El Shorbagy (EGY) | | ● | | ● | ● | | | | | |
| 3 | Chris Hanson (USA) | | | | | | | | ● | | ●● |
| 3 | Mostafa Asal (EGY) | | | | | | | | | ●●● | |
| 3 | George Parker (ENG) | | | | | | | | | ●●● | |
| 3 | Abdullah Al-Muzayen (KUW) | | | | | | | | | ● | ●● |
| 3 | Leonel Cárdenas (MEX) | | | | | | | | | ● | ●● |
| 3 | Asim Khan (PAK) | | | | | | | | | ● | ●● |
| 3 | Auguste Dussourd (FRA) | | | | | | | | | | ●●● |
| 3 | Joshua Larkin (AUS) | | | | | | | | | | ●●● |
| 2 | Ali Farag (EGY) | | ● | | ● | | | | | | |
| 2 | Miguel Ángel Rodríguez (COL) | | ● | | | ● | | | | | |
| 2 | Ramy Ashour (EGY) | | | ●● | | | | | | | |
| 2 | Saurav Ghosal (IND) | | | | | ● | ● | | | | |
| 2 | Max Lee (HKG) | | | | | ● | | ● | | | |
| 2 | Abdulla Al-Tamimi (QAT) | | | | | | ● | | ● | | |
| 2 | Leo Au (HKG) | | | | | | | ●● | | | |
| 2 | Tom Richards (ENG) | | | | | | | | ●● | | |
| 2 | Iker Pajares (ESP) | | | | | | | | ● | | ● |
| 2 | Jesús Camacho (MEX) | | | | | | | | | ●● | |
| 2 | Mohamed ElSherbini (EGY) | | | | | | | | | ●● | |
| 2 | Rex Hedrick (AUS) | | | | | | | | | ●● | |
| 2 | Farhan Mehboob (PAK) | | | | | | | | | ●● | |
| 2 | Ivan Yuen (MYS) | | | | | | | | | ●● | |
| 2 | Tayyab Aslam (PAK) | | | | | | | | | ● | ● |
| 2 | Alfredo Ávila (MEX) | | | | | | | | | ● | ● |
| 2 | Angus Gillams (ENG) | | | | | | | | | ● | ● |
| 2 | Vikram Malhotra (IND) | | | | | | | | | ● | ● |
| 2 | Ramit Tandon (IND) | | | | | | | | | ● | ● |
| 2 | Jan Van Den Herrewegen (BEL) | | | | | | | | | ● | ● |
| 2 | Mohammad Alsarraj (JOR) | | | | | | | | | | ●● |
| 2 | Carlos Cornes (ESP) | | | | | | | | | | ●● |
| 2 | Victor Crouin (FRA) | | | | | | | | | | ●● |
| 2 | Lyell Fuller (ENG) | | | | | | | | | | ●● |
| 2 | Eric Gálvez (MEX) | | | | | | | | | | ●● |
| 2 | Bernat Jaume (ESP) | | | | | | | | | | ●● |
| 2 | Mohd Syafiq Kamal (MYS) | | | | | | | | | | ●● |
| 2 | Dimitri Steinmann (SUI) | | | | | | | | | | ●● |
| 1 | Simon Rösner (GER) | | ● | | | | | | | | |
| 1 | Mohamed Abouelghar (EGY) | | | | | ● | | | | | |
| 1 | Yip Tsz Fung (HKG) | | | | | ● | | | | | |
| 1 | Mathieu Castagnet (FRA) | | | | | | ● | | | | |
| 1 | Borja Golán (ESP) | | | | | | | ● | | | |
| 1 | Grégoire Marche (FRA) | | | | | | | ● | | | |
| 1 | Zahed Mohamed (EGY) | | | | | | | ● | | | |
| 1 | Nicolas Müller (SUI) | | | | | | | ● | | | |
| 1 | César Salazar (MEX) | | | | | | | ● | | | |
| 1 | Adrian Waller (ENG) | | | | | | | ● | | | |
| 1 | Mohd Nafiizwan Adnan (MYS) | | | | | | | | ● | | |
| 1 | Karim El Hammamy (EGY) | | | | | | | | ● | | |
| 1 | Declan James (ENG) | | | | | | | | ● | | |
| 1 | Joel Makin (WAL) | | | | | | | | ● | | |
| 1 | Zac Alexander (AUS) | | | | | | | | | ● | |
| 1 | Ben Coleman (ENG) | | | | | | | | | ● | |
| 1 | Peter Creed (WAL) | | | | | | | | | ● | |
| 1 | Richie Fallows (ENG) | | | | | | | | | ● | |
| 1 | Charles Sharpes (ENG) | | | | | | | | | ● | |
| 1 | Youssef Soliman (EGY) | | | | | | | | | ● | |
| 1 | Olli Tuominen (FIN) | | | | | | | | | ● | |
| 1 | Eain Yow (MYS) | | | | | | | | | ● | |
| 1 | Benjamin Aubert (FRA) | | | | | | | | | | ● |
| 1 | Christopher Binnie (JAM) | | | | | | | | | | ● |
| 1 | Sébastien Bonmalais (FRA) | | | | | | | | | | ● |
| 1 | Jean-Pierre Brits (RSA) | | | | | | | | | | ● |
| 1 | Sean Conroy (IRE) | | | | | | | | | | ● |
| 1 | Ashley Davies (ENG) | | | | | | | | | | ● |
| 1 | Andrew Douglas (USA) | | | | | | | | | | ● |
| 1 | Josué Enríquez (GUA) | | | | | | | | | | ● |
| 1 | Shehab Essam (EGY) | | | | | | | | | | ● |
| 1 | Amaad Fareed (PAK) | | | | | | | | | | ● |
| 1 | Christopher Gordon (USA) | | | | | | | | | | ● |
| 1 | Tang Ming Hong (HKG) | | | | | | | | | | ● |
| 1 | Youssef Ibrahim (EGY) | | | | | | | | | | ● |
| 1 | Addeen Idrakie (MYS) | | | | | | | | | | ● |
| 1 | Aditya Jagtap (IND) | | | | | | | | | | ● |
| 1 | Alex Lau (HKG) | | | | | | | | | | ● |
| 1 | Navid Maleksabet (IRI) | | | | | | | | | | ● |
| 1 | Baptiste Masotti (FRA) | | | | | | | | | | ● |
| 1 | Michael McCue (CAN) | | | | | | | | | | ● |
| 1 | Daniel Mekbib (CZE) | | | | | | | | | | ● |
| 1 | Robertino Pezzota (ARG) | | | | | | | | | | ● |
| 1 | Harinder Pal Sandhu (IND) | | | | | | | | | | ● |
| 1 | Reiko Peter (SUI) | | | | | | | | | | ● |
| 1 | Aqeel Rehman (AUT) | | | | | | | | | | ● |
| 1 | Patrick Rooney (ENG) | | | | | | | | | | ● |
| 1 | Velavan Senthilkumar (IND) | | | | | | | | | | ● |
| 1 | Martin Švec (CZE) | | | | | | | | | | ● |
| 1 | Mario Yáñez (MEX) | | | | | | | | | | ● |
| 1 | Sajad Zareian (IRI) | | | | | | | | | | ● |

=== Titles won by nation (men's) ===
| Total | Nation | World Ch. | World Series | 100 | 70 | 50 | 35 | 25 | 15 | 10 | 5 |
|---|---|---|---|---|---|---|---|---|---|---|---|
| 29 | Egypt (EGY) | ● | ●●●●●● | ●●●●● | ●● | ●● | | ● | ● | ●●●●●● | ●●●●● |
| 16 | England (ENG) | | | | | | | ● | ●●● | ●●●●●●● | ●●●●● |
| 11 | Spain (ESP) | | | | | | | ● | ● | ●● | ●●●●●●● |
| 11 | Mexico (MEX) | | | | | | | ● | | ●●●● | ●●●●●● |
| 10 | France (FRA) | | | | | | ● | ● | | | ●●●●●●●● |
| 9 | India (IND) | | | | | ● | ● | | | ●● | ●●●●● |
| 8 | Pakistan (PAK) | | | | | | | | | ●●●● | ●●●● |
| 7 | Malaysia (MYS) | | | | | | | | ● | ●●● | ●●● |
| 6 | Hong Kong (HKG) | | | | | ● | | ●●● | | | ●● |
| 6 | Australia (AUS) | | | | | | | | | ●●● | ●●● |
| 5 | United States (USA) | | | | | | | | ● | | ●●●● |
| 4 | Switzerland (SUI) | | | | | | | ● | | | ●●● |
| 3 | Kuwait (KUW) | | | | | | | | | ● | ●● |
| 2 | Qatar (QAT) | | | | | | ● | | ● | | |
| 2 | Wales (WAL) | | | | | | | | ● | ● | |
| 2 | Belgium (BEL) | | | | | | | | | ● | ● |
| 2 | Czech Republic (CZE) | | | | | | | | | | ●● |
| 2 | Iran (IRI) | | | | | | | | | | ●● |
| 2 | Jordan (JOR) | | | | | | | | | | ●● |
| 1 | Germany (GER) | | ● | | | | | | | | |
| 1 | Finland (FIN) | | | | | | | | | ● | |
| 1 | Argentina (ARG) | | | | | | | | | | ● |
| 1 | Austria (AUT) | | | | | | | | | | ● |
| 1 | Canada (CAN) | | | | | | | | | | ● |
| 1 | Guatemala (GUA) | | | | | | | | | | ● |
| 1 | Jamaica (JAM) | | | | | | | | | | ● |
| 1 | South Africa (RSA) | | | | | | | | | | ● |

=== Titles won by player (women's) ===
| Total | Player | World Ch. | World Series | 100 | 70 | 50 | 35 | 25 | 15 | 10 | 5 |
|---|---|---|---|---|---|---|---|---|---|---|---|
| 7 | Nour El Sherbini (EGY) | | ●●●●● | ● | | ● | | | | | |
| 5 | Christine Nunn (AUS) | | | | | | | | | ●● | ●●● |
| 5 | Alexandra Fuller (RSA) | | | | | | | | | | ●●●●● |
| 4 | Millie Tomlinson (ENG) | | | | | | | | ●● | ●● | |
| 4 | Aifa Azman (MYS) | | | | | | | | | | ●●●● |
| 3 | Nour El Tayeb (EGY) | | ●● | | | | | ● | | | |
| 3 | Sivasangari Subramaniam (MYS) | | | | | | | | | ● | ●● |
| 3 | Tamika Saxby (AUS) | | | | | | | | | | ●●● |
| 2 | Raneem El Weleily (EGY) | ● | ● | | | | | | | | |
| 2 | Nouran Gohar (EGY) | | | | | ●● | | | | | |
| 2 | Donna Urquhart (AUS) | | | | | | | ●● | | | |
| 2 | Low Wee Wern (MYS) | | | | | | | | ● | ● | |
| 2 | Nadine Shahin (EGY) | | | | | | | | | ●● | |
| 2 | Lisa Aitken (SCO) | | | | | | | | | | ●● |
| 2 | Vanessa Chu (HKG) | | | | | | | | | | ●● |
| 2 | Tinne Gilis (BEL) | | | | | | | | | | ●● |
| 2 | Lucy Turmel (ENG) | | | | | | | | | | ●● |
| 2 | Faiza Zafar (PAK) | | | | | | | | | | ●● |
| 1 | Joelle King (NZL) | | | | | ● | | | | | |
| 1 | Sarah-Jane Perry (ENG) | | | | | ● | | | | | |
| 1 | Annie Au (HKG) | | | | | | | ● | | | |
| 1 | Amanda Sobhy (USA) | | | | | | | ● | | | |
| 1 | Yathreb Adel (EGY) | | | | | | | | ● | | |
| 1 | Rowan Elaraby (EGY) | | | | | | | | ● | | |
| 1 | Hania El Hammamy (EGY) | | | | | | | | ● | | |
| 1 | Amanda Landers-Murphy (NZL) | | | | | | | | ● | | |
| 1 | Fiona Moverley (ENG) | | | | | | | | ● | | |
| 1 | Emily Whitlock (ENG) | | | | | | | | ● | | |
| 1 | Jenny Duncalf (ENG) | | | | | | | | | ● | |
| 1 | Rachael Grinham (AUS) | | | | | | | | | ● | |
| 1 | Reeham Sedky (USA) | | | | | | | | | ● | |
| 1 | Jemyca Aribado (PHI) | | | | | | | | | | ● |
| 1 | Nicole Bunyan (CAN) | | | | | | | | | | ● |
| 1 | Julianne Courtice (ENG) | | | | | | | | | | ● |
| 1 | Andrea Lee (MYS) | | | | | | | | | | ● |
| 1 | Hana Ramadan (EGY) | | | | | | | | | | ● |
| 1 | Nikki Todd (CAN) | | | | | | | | | | ● |
| 1 | Jessica Turnbull (AUS) | | | | | | | | | | ● |
| 1 | Ho Tze-Lok (HKG) | | | | | | | | | | ● |
| 1 | Énora Villard (FRA) | | | | | | | | | | ● |
| 1 | Tong Tsz Wing (HKG) | | | | | | | | | | ● |
| 1 | Salma Youssef (EGY) | | | | | | | | | | ● |
| 1 | Madina Zafar (PAK) | | | | | | | | | | ● |

=== Titles won by nation (women's) ===
| Total | Nation | World Ch. | World Series | 100 | 70 | 50 | 35 | 25 | 15 | 10 | 5 |
|---|---|---|---|---|---|---|---|---|---|---|---|
| 21 | Egypt (EGY) | ● | ●●●●●●●● | ● | | ●●● | | ● | ●●● | ●● | ●● |
| 11 | England (ENG) | | | | | ● | | | ●●●● | ●●● | ●●● |
| 10 | Australia (AUS) | | | | | | | ●● | | ● | ●●●●●●● |
| 10 | Malaysia (MYS) | | | | | | | | ● | ●● | ●●●●●●● |
| 5 | Hong Kong (HKG) | | | | | | | ● | | | ●●●● |
| 5 | South Africa (RSA) | | | | | | | | | | ●●●●● |
| 3 | Pakistan (PAK) | | | | | | | | | | ●●● |
| 2 | United States (USA) | | | | | | | ● | | ● | |
| 2 | Belgium (BEL) | | | | | | | | | | ●● |
| 2 | New Zealand (NZL) | | | | | ● | | | ● | | |
| 2 | Canada (CAN) | | | | | | | | | | ●● |
| 2 | Scotland (SCO) | | | | | | | | | | ●● |
| 1 | France (FRA) | | | | | | | | | | ● |
| 1 | Philippines (PHI) | | | | | | | | | | ● |

== Retirements ==
Following is a list of notable players (winners of a main tour title, and/or part of the PSA Men's World Rankings and Women's World Rankings top 30 for at least one month) who announced their retirement from professional squash, became inactive, or were permanently banned from playing, during the 2017 season:

== See also ==
- 2016–17 PSA World Series
- 2017–18 PSA World Series
- 2017 Men's PSA World Series Finals
- 2017 Women's PSA World Series Finals
- 2017 Men's World Squash Championship
- 2017 Women's World Squash Championship
- 2017 Men's World Team Squash Championships
