= Vincent Droesbeke =

French squash player (born 1991)

Personal information
- Born: 25 September 1991 (age 34) Bourges, France

Sport
- Country: France
- Racquet used: Karakal

men's singles
- Highest ranking: 129 (May 2017)
- Current ranking: 172 (March 2018)

Vincent Droesbeke (born 25 September 1991) is a former French male professional squash player. He achieved his highest career ranking of 129 in May 2017 during the 2017 PSA World Tour. He retired in 2018.
