= Taylor Flavell =

Australian squash player (born 1994)

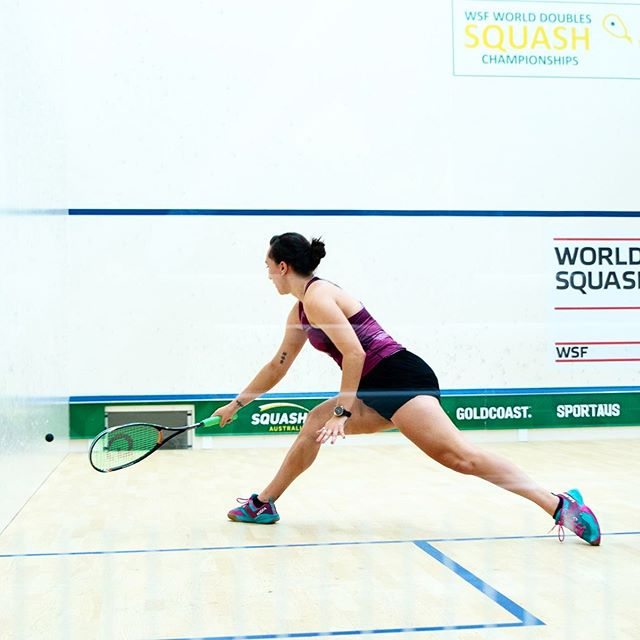

Personal information
- Born: 5 July 1994 (age 32) Rotorua, New Zealand

Sport
- Country: Australia
- Handedness: right-handed
- Racquet used: Grays

Women's singles
- Highest ranking: No. 91 (January 2018)
- Current ranking: No. 94 (March 2018)
Medal record
Women's squash
Representing Australia
World Doubles Championships
| Bronze medal – third place | 2019 Carrara | Doubles |
- Updated on 13 April 2022

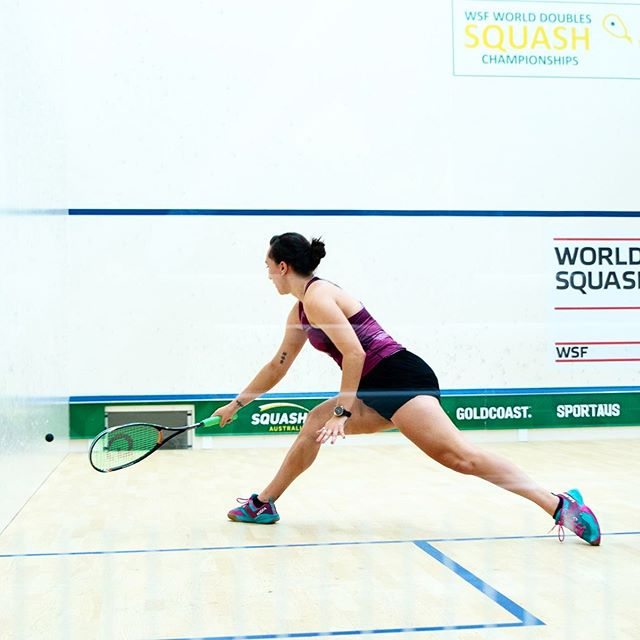
Taylor Flavell playing at World Squash Doubles Champs 2019

Taylor Flavell (born 5 July 1994) is a New Zealand born Australian female squash player. She has been competing on the PSA World Tour and achieved a highest singles career ranking of 91. Taylor placed third at the 2019 World Doubles Squash Championships with fellow player Selena Shaikh.

Currently Taylor is the Studio Manager of F45 Chinatown Melbourne - a fitness organisation that is the fastest growing gym franchise in the world. She was appointed as the club coach for the Melbourne Cricket Club squash section in 2018.
