= Sam Fenwick =

Welsh squash player (born 1992)

Personal information
- Born: 9 September 1992 (age 33) Caerphilly, Wales

Sport
- Country: Wales
- Racquet used: Technifibre

men's singles
- Highest ranking: 214 (September 2017)
- Current ranking: 308 (April 2018)

Sam Fenwick (born 9 September 1992) is a Welsh male squash player. He achieved his highest career ranking of 214 in September 2017, during the 2017 PSA World Tour.
