= Pakistan Squash Circuit =

The Pakistan Squash Circuit is a series of professional squash tournaments played every year in Pakistan.

== See also ==
- Squash in Pakistan
