= Enzo Corigliano =

French squash player (1997–2020)

Personal information
- Nickname: Zozo
- Born: 30 July 1997 Nouméa, New Caledonia
- Died: 12 December 2020 (aged 23) Canton, New York
- Height: 1.67 m (5 ft 6 in)
- Weight: 67 kg (148 lb)

Sport
- Country: France
- Handedness: Right Handed
- Turned pro: 2016
- Coached by: Benoit Letourneau
- Racquet used: Tecnifibre

Men's singles
- Highest ranking: No. 136 (August 2018)
- Title: 0
- Tour final: 1

Enzo Corigliano (30 July 1997 – 12 December 2020) was a French male professional squash player. As of August 2018, he was ranked No. 136. in the world. Prior to arriving at St. Lawrence, Enzo captained the French National U15 and U17 Squash teams and was a member of the team that finished 2nd at the European Junior Team Championships.

Until his death, he played on the varsity squash team at St. Lawrence University in Canton, New York.

He died in Canton, New York aged 23 on 12 December 2020. His family and friends raised over double their initial $20,000 goal on GoFundMe and were able to return him to his home in Nouméa, New Caledonia. "His first pride was to be a New Caledonian guy," where he was a local hero on the island for his squash play and joyous charisma. His Zoom Memorial included musical performances from friends, words from St. Lawrence University President William L. Fox, Family members, coaches and players from his respective squash teams.

The St. Lawrence University squash program received a $10,000 gift from an anonymous Laurentian to honor Enzo Corigliano '22. The university plans to use the funds to refurbish Court #3, the court where Enzo played most of his matches, and name it in his memory. It is now named "Zozo's Court" located in the Robie Squash Center in Canton, NY.
