= Zahir Shah (squash player) =

Pakistani squash player (born 1989)

Personal information
- Nationality: Pakistan
- Born: 23 December 1989 (age 36) Peshawar, Pakistan

Sport
- Racquet used: Dunlop

singles
- Highest ranking: 171 (March 2017)
- Current ranking: 288 (March 2018)

Zahir Shah (born 23 December 1989) is a Pakistani male squash player. He achieved his highest career ranking of 171 in March 2017.
