= Salma Youssef =

Egyptian squash player (born 1994)

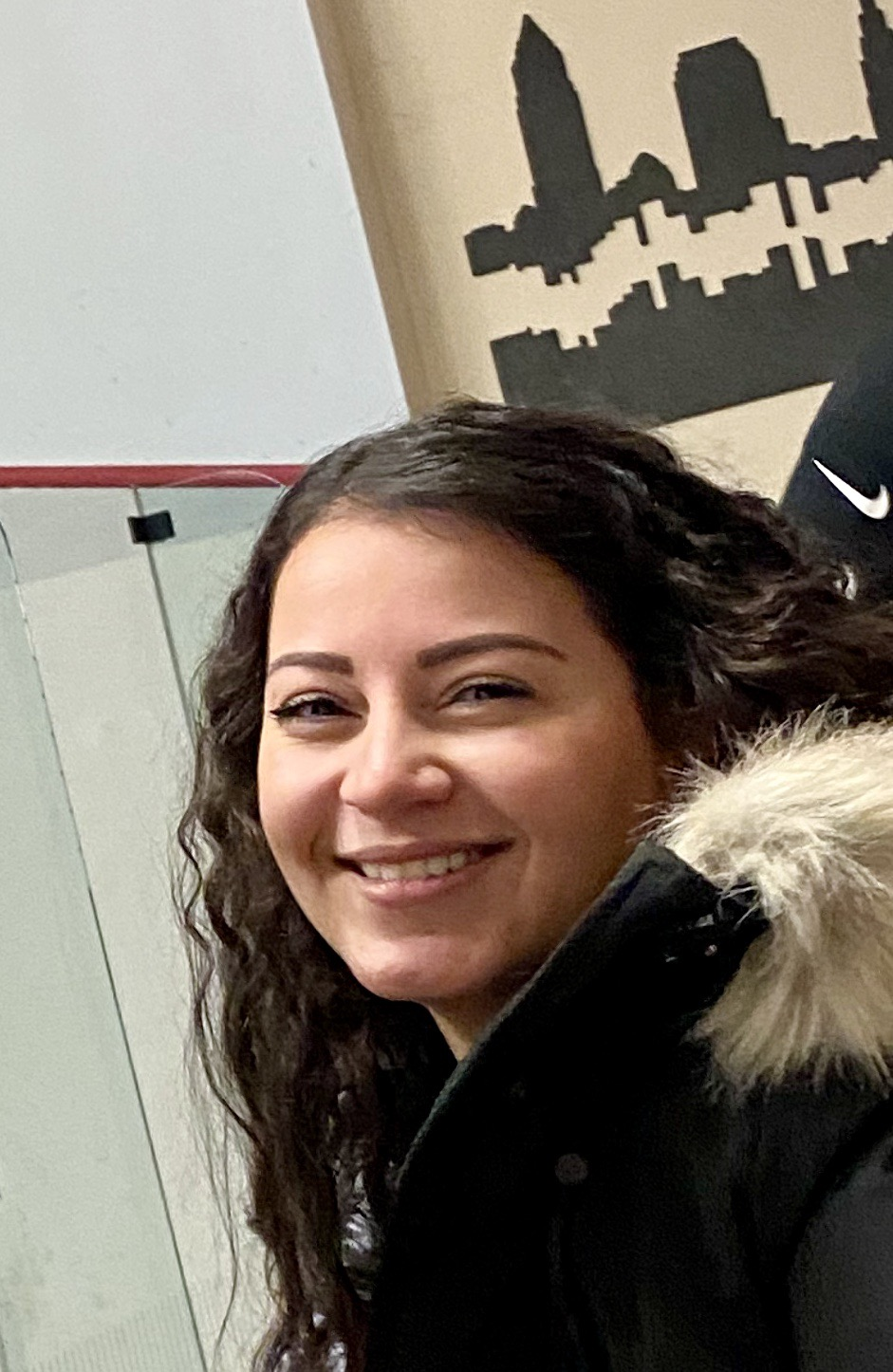
- Youssef in 2020

Personal information
- Born: 29 December 1994 (age 31) Cairo, Egypt

Sport
- Country: Egypt
- Handedness: Right Handed
- Turned pro: 2009
- Retired: Active
- Racquet used: Prince

Women's singles
- Highest ranking: No. 59 (January 2020)

Salma Hatem Youssef (born 29 December 1994) is an Egyptian professional squash player. She reached a career high ranking of number 59 in the world during January 2020. She has competed in numerous professional PSA tournaments and won the 2018 Lagos International Squash Classic.
