= Antonio de la Torre (squash player) =

Guatemalan squash player (born 1992)

Personal information
- Born: 12 August 1992 (age 33) Guatemala City, Guatemala

Sport
- Country: Guatemala
- Racquet used: Technifibre

men's singles
- Highest ranking: 222 (August 2015)
- Current ranking: 297 (March 2018)

Antonio de la Torre (born 12 August 1992) is a Guatemalan male professional squash player. He achieved his highest career ranking of 222 in August 2015 during the 2015 PSA World Tour and is currently ranked 297th during the 2018 PSA World Tour.
