= Ahmed Hosny =

Egyptian squash player (born 1991)

Personal information
- Born: 18 June 1991 (age 35) Cairo, Egypt

Sport
- Country: Egypt
- Turned pro: 2010
- Retired: Active
- Racquet used: Prince

Men's singles
- Highest ranking: No. 76 (March 2019)
- Current ranking: No. 76 (March 2019)
- Updated on 1 March 2019

Ahmed Hosny (born 18 June 1991 in Cairo) is an Egyptian professional squash player. He reached his career best ranking as the World No. 76 on 1 March 2019. He has competed in multiple professional squash tournaments.
