= Zeeshan Khan (squash player) =

Pakistani squash player (born 1997)

Personal information
- Nationality: Pakistan
- Born: 5 September 1997 (age 28) Peshawar, Pakistan

Sport
- Handedness: right-handed
- Racquet used: Technifiber

singles
- Highest ranking: 192 (March 2018)
- Current ranking: 192 (March 2018)

Zeeshan Khan (born 5 September 1997) is a Pakistani male squash player. He achieved his highest career ranking of 192 in March 2018 during the 2018 PSA World Tour.
