= Eva Feřteková =

Czech squash player (born 1985)

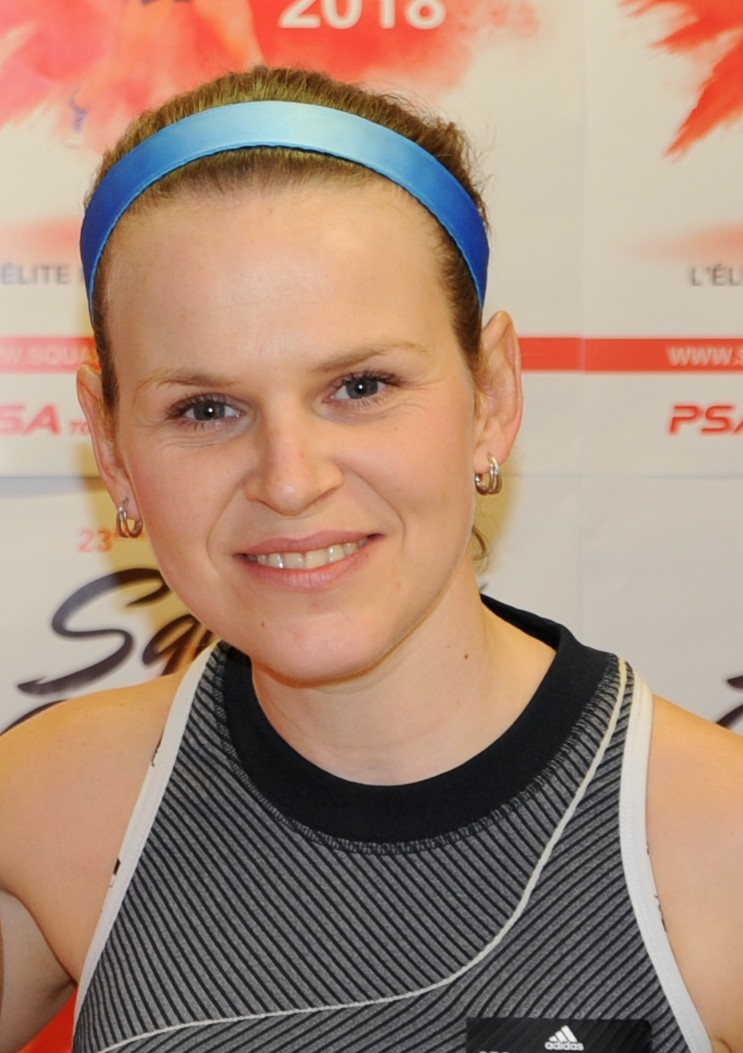
- Eva Feřteková, Monte Carlo Squash Classic 2018

Personal information
- Born: 14 April 1985 (age 41) Prague, Czechoslovakia

Sport
- Country: Czech Republic
- Handedness: Right Handed
- Retired: Active

Women's singles
- Highest ranking: No. 93 (August 2019)
- Current ranking: No. 95 (September 2019)
- Updated on September 2019

Eva Feřteková (born 14 April 1985 in Prague) is a Czech professional squash player. As of February 2018, she was ranked number 102 in the world.
