= Nazihah Hanis =

Malaysian squash player (born 1997)

Personal information
- Born: April 11, 1997 (age 29) Perak, Malaysia

Sport
- Country: Malaysia
- Handedness: Right Handed
- Retired: Active
- Racquet used: Dunlop

Women's singles
- Highest ranking: No. 91 (March 2017)
- Current ranking: No. 101 (February 2018)
- Updated on February, 2018

Nazihah Hanis (born 11 April 1997 in Perak) is a Malaysian professional squash player. As of February 2018, she was ranked number 101 in the world, though her career-high ranking has been World No. 91, in March 2017. She has played in the main draw of numerous professional PSA tournaments.
