= Umair Zaman =

Pakistani-born Qatari squash player (born 1997)

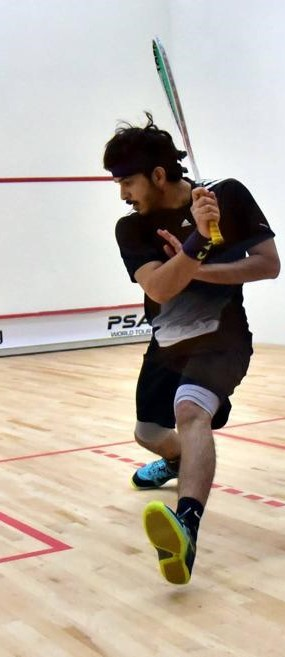
- Zaman playing a shot during Qatar Classic

Personal information
- Born: 24 June 1997 (age 29) Peshawar, Pakistan

Sport
- Country: Qatar
- Retired: Active
- Highest ranking: No. 164 (August 2018)
- Updated on February, 2018

Umair Zaman (born 24 June 1997 in Peshawar) is a Pakistani-born Qatari professional squash player. He was ranked world number 7 in under-19. As of February 2018, he was ranked number 185 in senior rankings in the world.
