= Muhammad Hannan =

Malaysian squash player (born 1995)

Personal information
- Born: 12 January 1995 (age 31) Kuala Lumpur, Malaysia
- Height: 171 cm (5 ft 7 in)
- Weight: 59 kg (130 lb)

Sport
- Country: Malaysia
- Coached by: Peter Genever
- Racquet used: Prince

Men's singles
- Highest ranking: 156 (October 2015)
- Current ranking: 306 (April 2018)
- Updated on April 16, 2018

Muhammad Hannan (born 12 January 1995) is a Malaysian male squash player who currently plays for the Malaysian national team at international competitions. He registered his highest career singles ranking of 156 in October 2015 during the 2015 PSA World Tour.

During the Tour One competition of the 2018 Malaysian Squash Tour, as a part of the 2018 PSA World Tour, he reached the semi-final round and lost to Syed Ali Mujtaba Shah Bokhari of Pakistan.
