= Mohd Shoaib Hassan =

Pakistani squash player (born 1990)

Personal information
- Full name: Muhammad Shoaib Hassan
- Born: May 27, 1990 (age 36) Lahore, Pakistan
- Height: 1.2 m (3 ft 11 in)
- Weight: 43 kg (95 lb)

Sport
- Country: Pakistan
- Turned pro: 2007
- Coached by: Fahim Gul
- Retired: Active
- Racquet used: Dunlop

Men's singles
- Highest ranking: 167 (July 2008)
- Current ranking: 360 (December 2009)
- Updated on December 22, 2009

Mohd Shoaib Hassan (Urdu: محمد شعیب حسن; born May 27, 1990, in Lahore) is a professional squash player who represented Pakistan. He reached a career-high world ranking of World No. 167 in July 2008.
