= Soheil Shameli =

Iranian squash player (born 1994)

Personal information
- Born: 28 September 1994 (age 31) Tehran, Iran

Sport
- Country: Iran
- Racquet used: Dunlop

men's singles
- Highest ranking: 221 (March 2018)
- Current ranking: not ranked (August 2026)

Soheil Shameli (born 28 September 1994) is an Iranian male squash player. He achieved his highest career ranking of 221 in March 2018 during the 2018 PSA World Tour, and is not ranked as of August 2026.
