= Dylan Cunningham =

American professional squash player

Personal information
- Born: July 22, 1994 (age 32) Philadelphia, USA

Sport
- Country: United States
- Handedness: Right Handed
- Turned pro: 2015
- Retired: Active
- Highest ranking: No. 100 (July 2017)
- Current ranking: No. 100 (February, 2018)
- Updated on February, 2018

Dylan Cunningham (born 22 July 1994 in Philadelphia) is an American professional squash player. As of February 2018, he was ranked number 100 in the world.
