= Michael Harris (squash player) =

English squash player (born 1989)

Personal information
- Born: 24 July 1989 (age 37) Exeter, England

Sport
- Country: England
- Turned pro: 2007
- Retired: Active
- Racquet used: Karakal

Men's singles
- Highest ranking: No. 115 (July 2014)
- Current ranking: No. 190 (February 2018)
- Updated on February, 2018

Michael Harris (born 24 July 1989 in Exeter) is an English professional squash player. As of February 2018, he was ranked number 190 in the world.
