= Selena Shaikh =

Australian female professional squash player (born 1992)

Personal information
- Born: 20 August 1992 (age 33) Armadale, Perth, Western Australia, Australia
- Height: 171 cm (5 ft 7 in)
- Weight: 63 kg (139 lb)

Sport
- Country: Australia
- Handedness: right-handed
- Turned pro: 2008
- Coached by: Karen Morrissey
- Retired: active
- Racquet used: Harrow

women's singles
- Highest ranking: 94 (September 2015)
- Current ranking: 119 (July 2018)
Medal record
Women's squash
Representing Australia
World Doubles Championships
Bronze medal – third place	2019 Carrara	Doubles

Selena Shaikh (born 20 August 1992) is an Australian professional squash player. As of July 2018, she is ranked 119 according to the PSA World rankings.

In July 2018, she was appointed as the head coach at the Grace Park Hawthorn Squash Club, Melbourne.
