= 2016–17 PSA World Tour =

Details
- Event name: 2016–17 PSA World Tour
- Dates: August 2016–July 2017
- Categories: World Championship: Men's/Women's; World Series 16–17; World Series Finals: Men's/Women's; PSA International 25/35/50/70/100; PSA Challenger 5/10/15
- Website; PSA World Tour

Achievements
- World Number 1: Men : (Egypt) Mohamed El Shorbagy (12 months); Women : (Egypt) Nour El Sherbini (8 months) (England) Laura Massaro (4 months)
- World Champion: Men : (Egypt) Karim Abdel Gawad; Women : (Egypt) Nour El Sherbini

The 2016–17 PSA World Tour is the international squash tour organised circuit organized by the Professional Squash Association (PSA) for the 2016 squash season. It's the 2nd PSA season since the merger of PSA and WSA associations in 2015. The most important tournaments in the series is the Men's World Championship and the Women's World Championship. The tour features three categories of regular events, World Series, which feature the highest prize money and the best fields, International and Challenger. In the middle of the year, the PSA World Series tour is concluded by the Men's PSA World Series Finals and the Women's PSA World Series Finals in Dubai, the end of the world series season for the top 8 rated players. Players performances in the tour are rated by the Men's World Rankings and Women's World Rankings.

== Calendar ==
Categories: International tournaments and more.

=== Key ===
World Championship
World Series
PSA 100
PSA 70
PSA 50
PSA 25/35
PSA 5/10/15

=== August ===
Tournament	Date	Champion	Runner-Up	Semifinalists	Quarterfinalists
Victorian Open; Wheelers Hill, Australia; Men : PSA 10; 32 players - $10,000 −−−−−− Women : PSA 10; 16 players - $10,000	3–7 August	(England) Joe Lee; 11–1, 11–4, 11–0	(Australia) Rex Hedrick	(India) Harinder Pal Sandhu (India) Kush Kumar	(Switzerland) Reiko Peter (Wales) Joel Makin (New Zealand) Evan Williams (Republic of Ireland) Arthur Gaskin
Victorian Open; Wheelers Hill, Australia; Men : PSA 10; 32 players - $10,000 −−−−−− Women : PSA 10; 16 players - $10,000	3–7 August	(England) Millie Tomlinson; 6–11, 11–4, 3–11, 11–7, 11–9	(India) Dipika Pallikal	(Egypt) Mayar Hany (Egypt) Nouran El Torky	(Belgium) Nele Gilis (Japan) Misaki Kobayashi (New Zealand) Megan Craig (South Africa) Siyoli Waters
Australian Open; Melbourne, Australia; Men : PSA 15; 32 players - $15,000 −−−−−− Women : PSA 15; 16 players - $15,000	8–12 August	(Qatar) Abdulla Al-Tamimi; 6–11, 11–9, 11–7, 11–5	(New Zealand) Campbell Grayson	(England) Joe Lee (Wales) Joel Makin	(India) Harinder Pal Sandhu (Australia) Rhys Dowling (Switzerland) Reiko Peter (New Zealand) Paul Coll
Australian Open; Melbourne, Australia; Men : PSA 15; 32 players - $15,000 −−−−−− Women : PSA 15; 16 players - $15,000	8–12 August	(India) Dipika Pallikal; 10–12, 11–5, 11–6, 11–4	(Egypt) Mayar Hany	(Australia) Donna Urquhart (Egypt) Hana Ramadan	(Egypt) Nouran El Torky (South Africa) Siyoli Waters (Japan) Misaki Kobayashi (Australia) Tamika Saxby
Courtcare Open; Pontefract, England; Men : PSA 10; 16 players - $10,000	11–14 August	(England) Ben Coleman; 11–5, 11–8, 11–9	(Egypt) Karim El Hammamy	(Australia) Matthew Hopkin (England) Chris Fuller	(England) Mark Fuller (England) Ashley Davies (Belgium) Jan Van Den Herrewegen (England) Patrick Rooney
Zenit Black Sea Open; Odesa, Ukraine; Men : PSA 5; 16 players - $5,500	18–21 August	(Australia) Matthew Hopkin; 11–6, 11–8, 14–12	(Czech Republic) Martin Švec	(England) Patrick Rooney (Italy) Stéphane Galifi	(Egypt) Hesham Aly (Finland) Matias Tuomi (Finland) Jami Äijänen (Egypt) Basem Makram
City of Greater Shepparton International; Shepparton, Australia; Men : PSA 5; 32 players - $5,000	19–21 August	(Republic of Ireland) Arthur Gaskin; 11–4, 11–2, 15–13	(South Korea) Woo Chang-wook	(England) Connor Sheen (Indonesia) Vivian Rhamanan	(Qatar) Syed Azlan Amjad (South Africa) Ruan Olivier (Egypt) Omar El Tahry (India) Sandeep Ramachandran
Cathay Pacific/Sun Hung Kai Financial HK Open; Hong Kong, China; Men : World Series; 32 players - $150,000 - Draw −−−−−− Women : World Series; 32 players - $115,000 - Draw	23–28 August	(Egypt) Ramy Ashour; 11–9, 8–11, 11–6, 5–11, 11–6	(Egypt) Karim Abdel Gawad	(Australia) Ryan Cuskelly (Hong Kong) Max Lee	(England) James Willstrop (Germany) Simon Rösner (Egypt) Fares Dessouky (Australia) Cameron Pilley
Cathay Pacific/Sun Hung Kai Financial HK Open; Hong Kong, China; Men : World Series; 32 players - $150,000 - Draw −−−−−− Women : World Series; 32 players - $115,000 - Draw	23–28 August	(Egypt) Nouran Gohar; 6–11, 12–10, 11–7, 11–8	(United States) Amanda Sobhy	(Malaysia) Nicol David (Egypt) Nour El Sherbini	(England) Laura Massaro (France) Camille Serme (Egypt) Nour El Tayeb (Egypt) Omneya Abdel Kawy
Legacy Wealth Belfast Open; Belfast, Northern Ireland; Men : PSA 5; 16 players - $5,000 −−−−−− Women : PSA 5; 16 players - $5,000	25–28 August	(England) Richie Fallows; 11–5, 11–6, 11–6	(England) Lyell Fuller	(Scotland) Douglas Kempsell (England) Chris Fuller	(Italy) Yuri Farneti (Republic of Ireland) Sean Conroy (South Africa) Tristan Eysele (Republic of Ireland) Brian Byrne
Legacy Wealth Belfast Open; Belfast, Northern Ireland; Men : PSA 5; 16 players - $5,000 −−−−−− Women : PSA 5; 16 players - $5,000	25–28 August	(France) Laura Pomportes; 11–9, 11–3, 11–5	(England) Rachael Chadwick	(Egypt) Hana Moataz (Czech Republic) Anna Serme	(Netherlands) Tessa ter Sluis (Latvia) Ineta Mackeviča (Belgium) Tinne Gilis (Wales) Elin Harlow
Tarra Volkswagen Bega Open; Bega, Australia; Men : PSA 5; 16 players - $6,000	25–28 August	(New Zealand) Lance Beddoes; 11–4, 11–5, 11–7	(England) Connor Sheen	(Indonesia) Vivian Rhamanan (France) Sébastien Bonmalais	(Australia) Joshua Larkin (India) Sandeep Ramachandran (England) Taminder Gata-Aura (India) Guhan Senthilkumar
Suez Helsinki Summer Challenger; Helsinki, Finland; Men : PSA 5; 16 players - $5,000	26–28 August	(Finland) Jami Äijänen; 11–9, 11–7, 11–7	(Spain) Iker Pajares	(Finland) Matias Tuomi (Finland) Kristian Rautiainen	(France) Baptiste Masotti (Egypt) Belal Nawar (England) Patrick Rooney (Australia) Matthew Hopkin

=== September ===
Tournament	Date	Champion	Runner-Up	Semifinalists	Quarterfinalists
China Open; Shanghai, China; Men : PSA 100; 16 players - $100,000 - Draw −−−−−− Women : PSA 70; 16 players - $70,000 - Draw	1–4 September	(Egypt) Mohamed El Shorbagy; 11–5, 11–3, 11–3	(France) Grégory Gaultier	(Spain) Borja Golán (Egypt) Karim Abdel Gawad	(India) Saurav Ghosal (Australia) Cameron Pilley (France) Mathieu Castagnet (Egypt) Tarek Momen
China Open; Shanghai, China; Men : PSA 100; 16 players - $100,000 - Draw −−−−−− Women : PSA 70; 16 players - $70,000 - Draw	1–4 September	(England) Laura Massaro; 11–9, 11–5, 11–3	(Egypt) Nouran Gohar	(New Zealand) Joelle King (Egypt) Raneem El Weleily	(England) Sarah-Jane Perry (England) Alison Waters (Egypt) Salma Hany (India) Joshna Chinappa
North Coast Open; Coffs Harbour, Australia; Men : PSA 5; 16 players - $5,000 −−−−−− Women : PSA 5; 16 players - $5,000	2–4 September	(Australia) Zac Alexander; 13–11, 11–4, 11–2	(Australia) Joshua Larkin	(France) Sébastien Bonmalais (England) Connor Sheen	(Australia) Thomas Calvert (Australia) Solayman Nowrozi (Australia) Darcy Evans (England) Taminder Gata-Aura
North Coast Open; Coffs Harbour, Australia; Men : PSA 5; 16 players - $5,000 −−−−−− Women : PSA 5; 16 players - $5,000	2–4 September	(Australia) Tamika Saxby; 11–3, 11–8, 11–2	(Australia) Lisa Camilleri	(Australia) Jessica Turnbull (Malaysia) Nazihah Hanis	(Australia) Stephanie Wighton (New Zealand) Eleanor Epke (Australia) Taylor Flavell (Australia) Samantha Foyle
Open International de Nantes; Nantes, France; Men : PSA 25; 16 players - $25,000 - Draw	7–11 September	(France) Grégoire Marche; 11–6, 8–11, 11–6, 11–2	(England) Chris Simpson	(England) Tom Richards (England) Daryl Selby	(Egypt) Karim Ali Fathi (Finland) Olli Tuominen (England) Declan James (Wales) Joel Makin
Open International de Nantes; Nantes, France; Women : PSA 5; 16 players - $5,000 - Draw	7–11 September	(Egypt) Hana Ramadan; 12–10, 11–4, 2–11, 11–9	(England) Rachael Chadwick	(England) Julianne Courtice (France) Laura Pomportes	(South Africa) Alexandra Fuller (Netherlands) Tessa ter Sluis (France) Chloé Mesic (Switzerland) Nadia Pfister
Segnatek Engineering Texas Open; Houston, United States; Men : PSA 10; 16 players - $10,000	8–11 September	(Egypt) Karim El Hammamy; 11–9, 11–8, 12–10	(India) Vikram Malhotra	(Jamaica) Christopher Binnie (Pakistan) Danish Atlas Khan	(Argentina) Leandro Romiglio (England) Eddie Charlton (New Zealand) Martin Knight (Mexico) Jesús Camacho
Harrow Charlottesville Open; Charlottesville, United States; Men : PSA 25; 16 players - $25,000	14–17 September	(South Africa) Stephen Coppinger; 8–11, 13–15, 14–12, 11–9, 11–4	(Australia) Ryan Cuskelly	(England) Adrian Waller (Peru) Diego Elías	(New Zealand) Campbell Grayson (Mexico) Arturo Salazar (Mexico) Alfredo Ávila (Botswana) Alister Walker
Macau Open; Macau, China; Men : PSA 50; 16 players - $50,000 - Draw −−−−−− Women : PSA 50; 16 players - $50,000 - Draw	15–18 September	(England) Daryl Selby; Walkover	(Hong Kong) Max Lee	(Egypt) Mohamed El Shorbagy (India) Saurav Ghosal	(Malaysia) Nafiizwan Adnan (India) Harinder Pal Sandhu (Scotland) Alan Clyne (Malaysia) Ivan Yuen
Macau Open; Macau, China; Men : PSA 50; 16 players - $50,000 - Draw −−−−−− Women : PSA 50; 16 players - $50,000 - Draw	15–18 September	(New Zealand) Joelle King; 5–11, 11–8, 11–3, 11–9	(Hong Kong) Annie Au	(Malaysia) Delia Arnold (England) Emily Whitlock	(Hong Kong) Joey Chan (Denmark) Line Hansen (Australia) Donna Urquhart (Egypt) Mayar Hany
China Challenge Cup; Beijing, China; Women : PSA 10; 16 players - $10,000	15–18 September	(Hong Kong) Tong Tsz Wing; 11–7, 4–11, 11–5, 11–5	(Australia) Sarah Cardwell	(China) Li Dongjin (Hong Kong) Vanessa Chu	(Malaysia) Teh Min Jie (Australia) Lisa Camilleri (Malaysia) Rachel Arnold (Philippines) Jemyca Aribado
Mano ANÜ Insel Bruggen Open; Brüggen, Germany; Men : PSA 5; 16 players - $6,000	15–18 September	(Netherlands) Piëdro Schweertman; 9–11, 11–9, 11–9, 11–5, 11–4	(France) Auguste Dussourd	(Austria) Aqeel Rehman (England) Robert Downer	(Republic of Ireland) Brian Byrne (Hungary) Balázs Farkas (Czech Republic) Daniel Mekbib (France) Victor Crouin
Kiva Club Open; Santa Fe, United States; Men : PSA 5; 16 players - $5,000	15–18 September	(England) Jaymie Haycocks; 12–10, 11–7, 11–3	(United States) Dylan Cunningham	(England) Reuben Phillips (Mexico) Edgar Zayas	(England) Charlie Lee (England) Alex Ingham (England) Adam Murrills (Nigeria) Babatunde Ajagbe
Al Ahram Open NEWGIZA; Cairo, Egypt; Men : PSA 100; 16 players - $100,000 - Draw −−−−−− Women : PSA 100; 16 players - $100,000 - Draw	19–23 September	(Egypt) Karim Abdel Gawad; 11–4, 11–7, 11–5	(Egypt) Ali Farag	(Egypt) Mohamed El Shorbagy (Egypt) Omar Mosaad	(Germany) Simon Rösner (Egypt) Zahed Salem (Egypt) Tarek Momen (Egypt) Ramy Ashour
Al Ahram Open NEWGIZA; Cairo, Egypt; Men : PSA 100; 16 players - $100,000 - Draw −−−−−− Women : PSA 100; 16 players - $100,000 - Draw	19–23 September	(Egypt) Raneem El Weleily; 11–5, 11–9, 9–11, 9–11, 11–7	(Egypt) Nour El Sherbini	(England) Sarah-Jane Perry (Egypt) Nour El Tayeb	(Malaysia) Nicol David (England) Alison Waters (United States) Amanda Sobhy (Egypt) Omneya Abdel Kawy
NASH Cup; London, Canada; Men : PSA 15; 16 players - $15,000 −−−−−− Women : PSA 10; 16 players - $10,000	21–24 September	(England) Declan James; 11–9, 11–5, 2–11, 6–11, 11–6	(Peru) Diego Elías	(Finland) Olli Tuominen (England) Ben Coleman	(Scotland) Douglas Kempsell (Belgium) Jan Van Den Herrewegen (Finland) Henrik Mustonen (Canada) Andrew Schnell
NASH Cup; London, Canada; Men : PSA 15; 16 players - $15,000 −−−−−− Women : PSA 10; 16 players - $10,000	21–24 September	(Canada) Danielle Letourneau; 9–11, 16–14, 11–13, 14–12, 18–16	(Japan) Misaki Kobayashi	(Canada) Samantha Cornett (Australia) Christine Nunn	(Canada) Nikki Todd (Canada) Hollie Naughton (Pakistan) Maria Toorpakay (Scotland) Alison Thomson
Netsuite Open; San Francisco, United States; Men : PSA 100; 16 players - $100,000 - Draw	27 Sep.–1 Oct.	(France) Grégory Gaultier; 11–9, 11–2, 14–12	(England) James Willstrop	(Egypt) Marwan El Shorbagy (Peru) Diego Elías	(Germany) Simon Rösner (Australia) Cameron Pilley (France) Grégoire Marche (Australia) Ryan Cuskelly
Netsuite Open; San Francisco, United States; Women : PSA 50; 16 players - $50,000 - Draw	27 Sep.–1 Oct.	(England) Laura Massaro; 11–4, 9–11, 11–8, 11–7	(United States) Amanda Sobhy	(Egypt) Nicol David (New Zealand) Joelle King	(England) Victoria Lust (Egypt) Heba El Torky (Hong Kong) Joey Chan (Egypt) Nour El Tayeb
Shiraz Open; Shiraz, Iran; Men : PSA 5; 16 players - $5,000	28 Sep.–1 Oct.	(Austria) Aqeel Rehman; 11–9, 11–7, 11–4	(Kuwait) Ammar Al-Tamimi	(Iraq) Mohammed Ferman (Iran) Navid Maleksabet	(Hong Kong) Alex Lau (Czech Republic) Ondřej Uherka (Iran) Sajad Zareian (Iran) Sami Ghasedabadi
BDO Northfield Cup; Waterloo, Canada; Men : PSA 5; 16 players - $5,000	28 Sep.–1 Oct.	(New Zealand) Martin Knight; 11–7, 11–5, 8–11, 11–1	(Scotland) Douglas Kempsell	(Belgium) Jan Van Den Herrewegen (Canada) Michael McCue	(England) Ashley Davies (Canada) David Baillargeon (Colombia) Andrés Herrera (Nigeria) Babatunde Ajagbe
Otters International JSW ISC; Mumbai, India; Men : PSA 5; 16 players - $5,000	29 Sep.–2 Oct.	(Spain) Iker Pajares; 11–3, 11–9, 11–3	(Spain) Edmon López	(Kuwait) Abdullah Al-Muzayen (England) Robert Downer	(Malaysia) Sanjay Singh (India) Ravi Dixit (India) Abhay Singh (England) Alex Noakes
Otters International JSW ISC; Mumbai, India; Women : PSA 35; 16 players - $35,000	29 Sep.–2 Oct.	(Hong Kong) Annie Au; 11–9, 13–11, 11–7	(India) Joshna Chinappa	(Wales) Tesni Evans (Malaysia) Delia Arnold	(India) Dipika Pallikal (Netherlands) Milou van der Heijden (Hong Kong) Liu Tsz-Ling (Egypt) Nadine Shahin
COAS International; Islamabad, Pakistan; Men : PSA 25; 16 players - $25,000	29 Sep.–2 Oct.	(Egypt) Omar Abdel Meguid; 11–8, 11–5, 11–4	(Malaysia) Ivan Yuen	(Hong Kong) Tsz Fung Yip (Pakistan) Tayyab Aslam	(Pakistan) Shahjahan Khan (Pakistan) Farhan Zaman (Egypt) Karim Ali Fathy (Pakistan) Faraz Muhammad

=== October ===
Tournament	Date	Champion	Runner-Up	Semifinalists	Quarterfinalists
Amir Kabir Cup; Arak, Iran; Men : PSA 5; 16 players - $5,000	4–7 October	(Hong Kong) Alex Lau; 9–11, 11–8, 11–6, 11–9	(Spain) Bernat Jaume	(Iran) Sajad Zareian (Iran) Sami Ghasedabadi	(Iraq) Husham Al-Saadi (Austria) Aqeel Rehman (Iraq) Hasanain Dakheel (Hong Kong) Chris Lo
Malaysian Squash Tour IV; George Town, Malaysia; Men : PSA 5; 16 players - $5,000 −−−−−− Women : PSA 5; 16 players - $5,000	5–7 October	(Pakistan) Ahsan Ayaz; 11–6, 14–12, 11–4	(Malaysia) Mohd Syafiq Kamal	(Hong Kong) Tang Ming Hong (Hong Kong) Tsun Hei Yuen	(Malaysia) Eain Yow (Hong Kong) Henry Leung (Malaysia) Elvinn Keo (India) Ravi Dixit
Malaysian Squash Tour IV; George Town, Malaysia; Men : PSA 5; 16 players - $5,000 −−−−−− Women : PSA 5; 16 players - $5,000	5–7 October	(Malaysia) Sivasangari Subramaniam; 11–5, 11–6, 9–11, 11–7	(Malaysia) Rachel Arnold	(Malaysia) Teh Min Jie (Hong Kong) Ho Tze-Lok	(Malaysia) Ooi Kah Yan (Malaysia) Heng Wai Wong (Malaysia) Lee Jia Wei (Malaysia) Zoe Foo Yuk Han
Delaware Investments U.S. Open; Philadelphia, United States; Men : World Series; 32 players - $150,000 - Draw −−−−−− Women : World Series; 32 players - $150,000 - Draw	8–15 October	(Egypt) Mohamed El Shorbagy; 10–12, 12–14, 11–1, 11–4, 3–0 (ret.)	(England) Nick Matthew	(Egypt) Karim Abdel Gawad (England) James Willstrop	(France) Grégory Gaultier (South Africa) Stephen Coppinger (Egypt) Ali Farag (Egypt) Marwan El Shorbagy
Delaware Investments U.S. Open; Philadelphia, United States; Men : World Series; 32 players - $150,000 - Draw −−−−−− Women : World Series; 32 players - $150,000 - Draw	8–15 October	(France) Camille Serme; 11–8, 7–11, 12–10, 11–9	(Egypt) Nour El Sherbini	(United States) Amanda Sobhy (Egypt) Raneem El Weleily	(England) Laura Massaro (Malaysia) Nicol David (Egypt) Nouran Gohar (England) Alison Waters
Malaysian Squash Tour V Kangar, Malaysia; Men : PSA 5; 16 players - $5,000 −−−−−− Women : PSA 5; 16 players - $5,000	10–12 October	(Malaysia) Mohd Syafiq Kamal; 14–12, 4–11, 8–11, 11–4, 11–6	(Malaysia) Eain Yow	(Malaysia) Elvinn Keo (Pakistan) Asim Khan	(India) Abhay Singh (India) Ravi Dixit (Malaysia) Valentino Bong (Hong Kong) Tang Ming Hong
Malaysian Squash Tour V Kangar, Malaysia; Men : PSA 5; 16 players - $5,000 −−−−−− Women : PSA 5; 16 players - $5,000	10–12 October	(Malaysia) Sivasangari Subramaniam; 9–11, 11–4, 9–11, 11–4, 11–2	(Hong Kong) Vanessa Chu	(Malaysia) Rachel Arnold (Malaysia) Ooi Kah Yan	(Malaysia) Teh Min Jie (Malaysia) Wen Li Lai (Pakistan) Sadia Gul (Malaysia) Aika Azman
Cleveland Skating Club Open; Cleveland, United States; Men : PSA 10; 16 players - $10,000	12–15 October	(Germany) Raphael Kandra; 11–7, 11–8, 11–8	(Canada) Andrew Schnell	(England) Richie Fallows (England) Charles Sharpes	(England) Eddie Charlton (Argentina) Leandro Romiglio (Finland) Henrik Mustonen (South Africa) Clinton Leeuw
LOC Charing Cross Classic; London, England; Men : PSA 5; 16 players - $5,000	12–15 October	(Wales) Peter Creed; 5–11, 11–1, 11–5, 11–6	(England) Patrick Rooney	(England) Nathan Lake (England) Joe Green	(England) Robert Downer (England) James Peach (England) Lyell Fuller (England) Kyle Finch
Securian Open; St. Paul, United States; Men : PSA 5; 16 players - $5,000	12–15 October	(England) Ashley Davies; 4–11, 11–8, 5–11, 11–7, 11–8	(Republic of Ireland) Arthur Gaskin	(England) Reuben Phillips (England) Charlie Johnson	(United States) Faraz Khan (Scotland) Jon Geekie (Mexico) Edgar Zayas (United States) Julian Illingworth
Black Knight Canada White Oaks Court Classic; Niagara-on-the-Lake, Canada; Men : PSA 5; 16 players - $5,000	13–16 October	(New Zealand) Martin Knight; 11–1, 7–11, 12–10, 11–2	(Canada) Michael McCue	(Jamaica) Lewis Walters (Canada) David Baillargeon	(Canada) Nick Sachvie (Mexico) Fernando Magdaleno (England) Anthony Graham (Bermuda) Micah Franklin
Harrow Ukrainian Squash Cup 3 Kyiv, Ukraine; Women : PSA 5; 16 players - $5,000	14–16 October	(Egypt) Zeina Mickawy; 9–11, 11–5, 12–10, 11–5	(Belgium) Tinne Gilis	(Egypt) Menna Nasser (Netherlands) Tessa ter Sluis	(England) Julianne Courtice (Germany) Sina Kandra (Netherlands) Milou van der Heijden (Netherlands) Sanne Veldkamp
Pakistan Navy CNS International; Islamabad, Pakistan; Men : PSA 25; 16 players - $25,000	19–22 October	(Egypt) Zahed Mohamed; 12–10, 11–9, 6–3 (retired)	(Egypt) Omar Abdel Meguid	(Pakistan) Farhan Mehboob (United States) Todd Harrity	(Pakistan) Tayyab Aslam (Pakistan) Farhan Zaman (Egypt) Youssef Soliman (Wales) Peter Creed
Life Time Chicago Open; Chicago, United States; Men : PSA 15; 16 players - $17,000	20–23 October	(New Zealand) Campbell Grayson; 5–11, 6–11, 11–9, 11–7, 11–4	(Scotland) Greg Lobban	(Germany) Raphael Kandra (Mexico) Arturo Salazar	(Finland) Henrik Mustonen (Canada) Andrew Schnell (England) Charles Sharpes (Germany) Jens Schoor
Q Squash Ltd Queensland Open; Gold Coast, Australia; Men : PSA 5; 16 players - $5,000 −−−−−− Women : PSA 5; 16 players - $5,000	21–23 October	(Australia) Zac Alexander; 11–9, 6–11, 11–8, 11–7	(Australia) Joshua Larkin	(Australia) Matthew Hopkin (England) Patrick Rooney	(Australia) Brad Freeme (Switzerland) Dimitri Steinmann (Switzerland) Manuel Wanner (Australia) Thomas Calvert
Q Squash Ltd Queensland Open; Gold Coast, Australia; Men : PSA 5; 16 players - $5,000 −−−−−− Women : PSA 5; 16 players - $5,000	21–23 October	(England) Jenny Duncalf; 12–14, 11–6, 12–10, 12–10	(Australia) Christine Nunn	(Hong Kong) Tong Tsz Wing (Australia) Rachael Grinham	(Hong Kong) Ho Tze-Lok (Hong Kong) Vanessa Chu (New Zealand) Abbie Palmer (Australia) Tamika Saxby
Carol Weymuller Open; Brooklyn, United States; Women : PSA 50; 16 players - $50,000 - Draw	20–24 October	(Egypt) Nour El Sherbini; 13–11, 11–6, 11–3	(England) Alison Waters	(France) Camille Serme (England) Sarah-Jane Perry	(New Zealand) Joelle King (Hong Kong) Annie Au (United States) Olivia Blatchford (India) Joshna Chinappa
Slaight Music Granite Open; Toronto, Canada; Women : PSA 15; 16 players - $16,000	25–28 October	(England) Millie Tomlinson; 11–9, 13–11, 5–11, 11–7	(Canada) Samantha Cornett	(Egypt) Nada Abbas (Mexico) Samantha Terán	(Canada) Hollie Naughton (Canada) Nikki Todd (Pakistan) Maria Toorpakay (Egypt) Nouran El Torky
Malaysian Squash Tour VI; Kuantan, Malaysia; Men : PSA 5; 16 players - $5,000 −−−−−− Women : PSA 5; 16 players - $5,000	25–28 October	(Malaysia) Elvinn Keo; 11–6, 11–6, 8–11, 10–12, 11–5	(Malaysia) Valentino Bong	(Pakistan) Muhammad Shoaib (Malaysia) Sanjay Singh	(Malaysia) Bryan Lim Tze Kang (India) Gurshan Singh (Hong Kong) Alex Lau (Malaysia) Muhammad Hannan
Malaysian Squash Tour VI; Kuantan, Malaysia; Men : PSA 5; 16 players - $5,000 −−−−−− Women : PSA 5; 16 players - $5,000	25–28 October	(Malaysia) Sivasangari Subramaniam; 11–7, 13–11, 11–7	(Hong Kong) Tong Tsz Wing	(Malaysia) Rachel Arnold (Malaysia) Ooi Kah Yan	(India) Sachika Ingale (Pakistan) Sammer Anjum (Malaysia) Chan Yiwen (Malaysia) Aika Azman
Tournoi Féminin Val de Marne; Créteil, France; Women : PSA 5; 16 players - $5,000	27–29 October	(Netherlands) Milou van der Heijden; 11–9, 12–10, 11–9	(England) Julianne Courtice	(England) Rachael Chadwick (France) Laura Pomportes	(Czech Republic) Anna Serme (Latvia) Ineta Mackeviča (South Africa) Cheyna Tucker (France) Énora Villard
Mackay Open; Mackay, Australia; Men : PSA 5 $5,000 −−−−−− Women : PSA 5 $5,000	28–30 October	(Australia) Zac Alexander; 11–6, 11–8, 11–3	(Switzerland) Manuel Wanner	(South Africa) Jean-Pierre Brits (England) Patrick Rooney	(Switzerland) Dimitri Steinmann (Australia) Darcy Evans (Australia) Thomas Calvert (Australia) Solayman Nowrozi
Mackay Open; Mackay, Australia; Men : PSA 5 $5,000 −−−−−− Women : PSA 5 $5,000	28–30 October	(New Zealand) Amanda Landers-Murphy; 11–7, 12–10, 6–11, 11–3	(Australia) Lisa Camilleri	(Australia) Tamika Saxby (Australia) Jessica Turnbull	(South Africa) Milnay Louw (Australia) Samantha Calvert (Australia) Samantha Foyle (Australia) Stephanie Wighton
PSA Men's World Championship; Cairo, Egypt; Men : World Championship; 64 players - $325,000 - Draw	27 Oct.–4 Nov.	(Egypt) Karim Abdel Gawad; 5–11, 11–6, 11–7, 2–1 (retired)	(Egypt) Ramy Ashour	(Egypt) Mohamed El Shorbagy (France) Grégory Gaultier	(Egypt) Tarek Momen (Egypt) Fares Dessouky (England) Nick Matthew (Egypt) Ali Farag
Wadi Degla Open; Cairo, Egypt; Women : PSA 50; 16 players - $50,000 - Draw	31 Oct.–4 Nov.	(Egypt) Raneem El Weleily; 11–8, 7–11, 11–4, 11–5	(Egypt) Nouran Gohar	(Malaysia) Nicol David (Wales) Tesni Evans	(Egypt) Nour El Tayeb (Australia) Donna Urquhart (Egypt) Salma Hany (Egypt) Mariam Metwally

=== November ===
Tournament	Date	Champion	Runner-Up	Semifinalists	Quarterfinalists
Nicola Wealth Open; Vancouver, Canada; Women : PSA 10; 16 players - $10,000	2–5 November	(Canada) Hollie Naughton; 11–2, 11–7, 11–5	(Egypt) Nada Abbas	(Egypt) Zeina Mickawy (Canada) Nicole Bunyan	(Canada) Samantha Cornett (France) Chloé Mesic (Egypt) Nouran El Torky (Scotland) Alison Thomson
Life Time Minneapolis Open; Minneapolis, United States; Men : PSA 10; 16 players - $10,000	3–6 November	(Canada) Nick Sachvie; 11–5, 11–6, 11–2	(Colombia) Juan Camilo Vargas	(England) Anthony Graham (Mexico) Arturo Salazar	(United States) Chris Hanson (South Africa) Clinton Leeuw (Pakistan) Danish Atlas Khan (United States) Faraz Khan
Herzliya Autumn Tournament; Herzliya, Israel; Men : PSA 5; 16 players - $5,000	3–6 November	(Netherlands) Piëdro Schweertman; 11–8, 11–3, 9–11, 11–3	(France) Baptiste Masotti	(France) Auguste Dussourd (Israel) Roee Avraham	(British Virgin Islands) Joe Chapman (Wales) Emyr Evans (Israel) Daniel Poleshchuk (Belgium) Joeri Hapers
Pacific Toyota Cairns International; Cairns, Australia; Men : PSA 5; 16 players - $5,000 −−−−−− Women : PSA 5; 16 players - $5,000	4–6 November	(Australia) Zac Alexander; 11–6, 11–4, 9–11, 11–7	(Australia) Steven Finitsis	(Portugal) Rui Soares (New Zealand) Ben Grindrod	(England) Patrick Rooney (Australia) Thomas Calvert (Australia) Solayman Nowrozi (Australia) David Clegg
Pacific Toyota Cairns International; Cairns, Australia; Men : PSA 5; 16 players - $5,000 −−−−−− Women : PSA 5; 16 players - $5,000	4–6 November	(New Zealand) Amanda Landers-Murphy; 11–7, 11–8, 11–7	(South Africa) Milnay Louw	(Australia) Jessica Turnbull (Hong Kong) Ho Tze-Lok	(Australia) Samantha Foyle (Australia) Lisa Camilleri (Australia) Stephanie Wighton (Australia) Selena Shaikh
4th Open Provence Chateau-Arnoux; Château-Arnoux, France; Men : PSA 5; 16 players - $5,000	4–6 November	(Spain) Carlos Cornes; 5–11, 18–16, 11–3, 5–11, 13–11	(France) Christophe André	(France) Geoffrey Demont (England) George Parker	(England) Bradley Masters (Scotland) Douglas Kempsell (France) Victor Crouin (South Africa) Tristan Eysele
JSF Amman Open; Amman, Jordan; Men : PSA 5; 16 players - $5,000 −−−−−− Women : PSA 5; 16 players - $5,000	5–8 November	(Jordan) Mohammad Al-Saraj; 11–5, 6–11, 11–7, 11–9	(Hong Kong) Alex Lau	(Pakistan) Khawaja Adil Maqbool (Iraq) Mohammed Ferman	(Hong Kong) Chris Lo (Egypt) Shehab Essam (Iran) Sami Ghasedabadi (Egypt) Ahmed Hussein
JSF Amman Open; Amman, Jordan; Men : PSA 5; 16 players - $5,000 −−−−−− Women : PSA 5; 16 players - $5,000	5–8 November	(Egypt) Kanzy El Defrawy; 11–5, 11–5, 7–11, 11–0	(Hong Kong) Tong Tsz Wing	(Egypt) Menna Nasser (Hong Kong) Vanessa Chu	(Iran) Taba Taghavi (Egypt) Farah Momen (Iran) A Mousavizadeh (France) Cyrielle Peltier
GoodLife Open; Ottawa, Canada; Men : PSA 10; 16 players - $10,000	10–13 November	(United States) Christopher Gordon; 11–9, 11–6, 9–11, 11–9	(Canada) Michael McCue	(Finland) Henrik Mustonen (Wales) Peter Creed	(Jamaica) Christopher Binnie (England) Joe Green (New Zealand) Martin Knight (Canada) Shawn Delierre
Open International Niort-Venise Verte; Bessines, France; Men : PSA 5; 16 players - $5,000	11–13 November	(Scotland) Douglas Kempsell; 7–11, 11–8, 11–9, 11–7	(France) Baptiste Masotti	(Jordan) Mohammad Al-Saraj (England) Chris Fuller	(France) Christophe André (Italy) Yuri Farneti (France) Auguste Dussourd (France) Sébastien Bonmalais
Tree Brewing Kelowna Open; Kelowna, Canada; Men : PSA 5; 16 players - $5,000	11–13 November	(England) Kyle Finch; 11–13, 12–10, 4–11, 11–6, 12–10	(England) Adam Murrills	(United States) Chris Hanson (Mexico) Miled Zarazúa	(Wales) Emyr Evans (England) Anthony Graham (Nigeria) Babatunde Ajagbe (England) Mark Broekman
Qatar Classic; Doha, Qatar; Men : World Series; 32 players - $150,000 - Draw	13–18 November	(Egypt) Karim Abdel Gawad; 12–10, 15–13, 11–7	(Egypt) Mohamed El Shorbagy	(England) Nick Matthew (England) Daryl Selby	(Germany) Simon Rösner (France) Grégoire Marche (Australia) Cameron Pilley (Egypt) Marwan El Shorbagy
Simon Warder Memorial; Sarnia, Canada; Men : PSA 5; 16 players - $5,000 −−−−−− Women : PSA 5; 16 players - $5,000	16–19 November	(Colombia) Juan Camilo Vargas; 11–9, 11–4, 13–11	(France) Vincent Droesbeke	(England) Anthony Graham (Republic of Ireland) Arthur Gaskin	(Jamaica) Lewis Walters (Canada) Cameron Seth (Wales) Emyr Evans (England) Lyell Fuller
Simon Warder Memorial; Sarnia, Canada; Men : PSA 5; 16 players - $5,000 −−−−−− Women : PSA 5; 16 players - $5,000	16–19 November	(Canada) Samantha Cornett; 12–10, 11–3, 12–10	(Finland) Emilia Soini	(Malaysia) Nessrine Ariffin (India) Janet Vidhi	(Canada) Paula Jenkins (Pakistan) Maria Toorpakay (Canada) Micaala Seth (Canada) Nicole Bunyan
Sunrise Foods Saskatoon Movember Boast; Saskatoon, Canada; Men : PSA 10; 16 players - $10,000	17–20 November	(England) Joshua Masters; 11–6, 4–11, 16–14, 11–8	(Wales) Peter Creed	(Canada) Andrew Schnell (Canada) Michael McCue	(Finland) Henrik Mustonen (Australia) Joshua Larkin (Canada) Shawn Delierre (New Zealand) Martin Knight
Serena Hotels CAS International; Islamabad, Pakistan; Men : PSA 25; 16 players - $25,000	18–21 November	(Pakistan) Farhan Mehboob; 11–9, 11–6, 6–11, 11–5	(Pakistan) Farhan Zaman	(Hong Kong) Leo Au (Egypt) Mohamed Reda	(Egypt) Shehab Essam (England) Nathan Lake (Egypt) Youssef Soliman (Egypt) Karim El Hammamy
Monte Carlo Classic; Monte Carlo, Monaco; Women : PSA 25; 16 players - $25,000	22–25 November	(England) Victoria Lust; 9–11, 11–6, 5–11, 11–9, 11–8	(England) Millie Tomlinson	(Egypt) Nadine Shahin (Australia) Donna Urquhart	(Denmark) Line Hansen (England) Fiona Moverley (Egypt) Hana Ramadan (Canada) Hollie Naughton
ReidBuilt Homes Edmonton Open; Edmonton, Canada; Men : PSA 35; 16 players - $35,000	23–26 November	(Peru) Diego Elías; 11–4, 11–4, 11–7	(Mexico) César Salazar	(England) Daryl Selby (Mexico) Alfredo Ávila	(Botswana) Alister Walker (England) Ben Coleman (England) Charles Sharpes (England) Joe Lee
CCI International; Mumbai, India; Men : PSA 50; 16 players - $50,000	24–27 November	(Egypt) Fares Dessouky; 11–9, 8–11, 11–6, 7–11, 11–5	(Egypt) Mohamed Abouelghar	(England) Chris Simpson (Switzerland) Nicolas Müller	(India) Saurav Ghosal (Scotland) Alan Clyne (Egypt) Mohamed Reda (France) Lucas Serme
Tournoi Invitation Club Sportif MAA; Montreal, Canada; Men : PSA 5; 16 players - $5,000	29 Nov.–2 Dec.	(Canada) Nick Sachvie; 11–8, 11–7, 12–10	(Canada) Michael McCue	(Jamaica) Lewis Walters (Colombia) Juan Camilo Vargas	(Canada) David Baillargeon (Colombia) Andrés Herrera (Mexico) Edgar Zayas (United States) Chris Hanson
Wasatch Advisors Salt Lake City Open; Salt Lake City, United States; Men : PSA 15; 16 players - $15,000	30 Nov.–3 Dec.	(Mexico) Alfredo Ávila; 11–5, 11–6, 14–12	(United States) Todd Harrity	(New Zealand) Martin Knight (Finland) Henrik Mustonen	(England) Eddie Charlton (United States) Christopher Gordon (Australia) Joshua Larkin (United States) Faraz Khan
PSA Valencia; Paterna, Spain; Men : PSA 10; 16 players - $10,000	30 Nov.–3 Dec.	(Egypt) Mazen Gamal; 9–11, 11–2, 11–7, 11–5	(Egypt) Karim El Hammamy	(Spain) Iker Pajares (Egypt) Shehab Essam	(Netherlands) Piëdro Schweertman (Austria) Aqeel Rehman (Germany) Jens Schoor (Israel) Daniel Poleshchuk
Bitar Cosmetics Play Squash Women's Open; McLean, United States; Women : PSA 5; 16 players - $5,000	30 Nov.–3 Dec.	(Egypt) Kanzy El Defrawy; 11–1, 11–3, 11–3	(Canada) Nicole Bunyan	(South Africa) Elani Landman (Colombia) Catalina Peláez	(United States) Marina Stefanoni (Finland) Emilia Soini (Egypt) Farah Abdel Meguid (South Africa) Lume Landman

=== December ===
Tournament	Date	Champion	Runner-Up	Semifinalists	Quarterfinalists
Airport Xmas Challenger; Berlin, Germany; Men : PSA 5; 16 players - $5,000	1–3 December	(Scotland) Douglas Kempsell; 11–5, 11–8, 7–11, 11–9	(Jordan) Mohammad Al-Saraj	(Portugal) Rui Soares (Switzerland) Dimitri Steinmann	(England) Adam Murrills (Finland) Jami Äijänen (Israel) Roee Avraham (Switzerland) Manuel Wanner
London Open; London, England; Men : PSA 10; 16 players - $10,000 −−−−−− Women : PSA 5; 16 players - $5,000	1–4 December	(England) Charles Sharpes; 11–6, 11–7, 11–7	(France) Christophe André	(England) Tom Ford (Malaysia) Mohd Syafiq Kamal	(England) Adam Auckland (Wales) Peter Creed (Pakistan) Asim Khan (Pakistan) Israr Ahmed
London Open; London, England; Men : PSA 10; 16 players - $10,000 −−−−−− Women : PSA 5; 16 players - $5,000	1–4 December	(Egypt) Nada Abbas; 8–11, 11–4, 11–7, 11–13, 11–4	(England) Julianne Courtice	(England) Rachael Chadwick (Czech Republic) Anna Serme	(United States) Haley Mendez (England) Elise Lazarus (Belgium) Tinne Gilis (Switzerland) Céline Walser
Old Chang Kee Marigold Singapore Open; Singapore; Men : PSA 5; 16 players - $5,000	1–4 December	(Hong Kong) Tang Ming Hong; 3–11, 11–9, 11–3, 8–11, 11–4	(Malaysia) Elvinn Keo	(Malaysia) Addeen Idrakie (Malaysia) Gurshan Singh	(Taiwan) James Huang (Hong Kong) Henry Leung (Malaysia) Valentino Bong (South Korea) Woo Chang-wook
ASB Prague Squash Classic; Prague, Czech Republic; Men : PSA 5; 16 players - $5,000	2–4 December	(Spain) Carlos Cornes; 11–4, 13–11, 11–8	(New Zealand) Evan Williams	(Czech Republic) Martin Švec (Czech Republic) Daniel Mekbib	(New Zealand) Lance Beddoes (England) Kyle Finch (Wales) Emyr Evans (England) Nick Mulvey
AJ Bell British Grand Prix; Manchester, England; Men : PSA 70; 16 players - $70,000 - Draw	2–5 December	(England) Nick Matthew; 11–7, 12–10, 11–4	(England) James Willstrop	(France) Grégory Gaultier (England) Daryl Selby	(Australia) Cameron Pilley (Hong Kong) Max Lee (England) Richie Fallows (Malaysia) Nafiizwan Adnan
Iran Navy Squash Open; Tehran, Iran; Men : PSA 5; 16 players - $5,000	6–9 December	(France) Auguste Dussourd; 8–11, 11–9, 11–8, 6–11, 11–8	(Pakistan) Tayyab Aslam	(Pakistan) Ahsan Ayaz (Iran) Sajjad Zareeian	(Pakistan) Amaad Fareed (Belgium) Joeri Hapers (Iran) Mohammad Sadeghpour (Czech Republic) Martin Švec
Open International des Volcans; Clermont-Ferrand, France; Women : PSA 10; 16 players - $10,000	7–10 December	(Belgium) Nele Gilis; 11–8, 11–6, 7–11, 11–8	(New Zealand) Amanda Landers-Murphy	(Japan) Misaki Kobayashi (England) Millie Tomlinson	(Egypt) Hana Moataz (Egypt) Zeina Mickawy (Egypt) Nouran El Torky (France) Chloé Mesic
Sutton Coldfield International; Sutton Coldfield, England; Men : PSA 5; 16 players - $5,000	7–10 December	(Belgium) Jan Van Den Herrewegen; 8–11, 9–11, 11–6, 11–8, 11–4	(England) Mike Harris	(England) Jaymie Haycocks (Malaysia) Mohd Syafiq Kamal	(New Zealand) Ben Grindrod (Brazil) Vini Rodrigues (England) Mark Fuller (England) Andrew Birks
Life Time Florida Open; Boca Raton, United States; Men : PSA 10; 16 players - $10,000	8–11 December	(Wales) Peter Creed; 11–4, 9–11, 13–11, 11–4	(England) Angus Gillams	(Spain) Bernat Jaume (England) Richie Fallows	(Botswana) Alister Walker (New Zealand) Martin Knight (United States) Andrew Douglas (England) Joe Green
LiveStuff Open; Tuxedo, NY, United States; Women : PSA 5 $5,000	8–11 December	(Egypt) Kanzy El Defrawy; 11–3, 11–9, 11–7	(England) Georgina Stoker	(South Africa) Elani Landman (South Africa) Lume Landman	(Colombia) Catalina Peláez (United States) Kelsey Engman (Pakistan) Sadia Gul (Canada) Nicole Bunyan
Question Tools Grimsby & Cleethorpes Open; Grimsby, England; Men : PSA 5; 16 players - $5,000	9–11 December	(England) Adam Murrills; 4–11, 11–9, 5–11, 14–12, 11–6	(New Zealand) Evan Williams	(Republic of Ireland) Brian Byrne (England) Adam Auckland	(England) Ashley Davies (Pakistan) Israr Ahmed (France) Enzo Corigliano (Pakistan) Asim Khan
Channel VAS Championship at St George's Hill; Weybridge, England; Men : PSA 100; 16 players - $100,000 - Draw	8–12 December	(New Zealand) Paul Coll; 11–7, 13–11, 11–4	(Egypt) Tarek Momen	(England) Daryl Selby (England) James Willstrop	(Colombia) Miguel Ángel Rodríguez (South Africa) Stephen Coppinger (Egypt) Marwan El Shorbagy (Egypt) Saurav Ghosal
Shahid Daghayeghi Open; Ahvaz, Iran; Men : PSA 5; 16 players - $5,000	13–16 December	(Kuwait) Ammar Al-Tamimi; 8–11, 11–9, 6–11, 11–2, 11–8 (1st PSA title)	(France) Auguste Dussourd	(Pakistan) Ahsan Ayaz (Pakistan) Tayyab Aslam	(Czech Republic) Martin Švec (Pakistan) Amaad Fareed (Iran) Erfan Jamshidi (Belgium) Joeri Hapers
Pareti Squash Open; Kyiv, Ukraine; Men : PSA 5; 16 players - $5,000 −−−−−− Women : Closed Satellite; 12 players - $1,000	14–17 December	(Italy) Stéphane Galifi; 9–11, 14–12, ret.	(Czech Republic) Ondřej Uherka	(England) Taminder Gata-Aura (Germany) Yannik Omlor	(New Zealand) Ben Grindrod (Spain) Carlos Cornes (Finland) Jami Äijänen (Netherlands) Roshan Bharos
Pareti Squash Open; Kyiv, Ukraine; Men : PSA 5; 16 players - $5,000 −−−−−− Women : Closed Satellite; 12 players - $1,000	14–17 December	(Ukraine) Alina Bushma; 9–11, 14–12, ret.	(Poland) Paulina Krzywicka	(Greece) Elíza Kargióti (Ukraine) Liana Sardak	(Russia) Ekaterina Marusan (Belarus) Olga Khmelevskaya (Belarus) Iryna Kulbatskaya (Greece) Nikoletta Pozidi
IMET PSA Open; Bratislava, Slovakia; Men : PSA 5; 32 players - $5,000	15–18 December	(Jordan) Mohammad Al-Saraj; 11–4, 11–3, 11–7	(Hungary) Balázs Farkas	(Netherlands) Piëdro Schweertman (Spain) Bernat Jaume	(England) Mark Fuller (France) Benjamin Aubert (Netherlands) Marc Ter Sluis (England) Chris Fuller
Malaysian Squash Tour VII; Kuching, Malaysia; Men : PSA 10; 16 players - $10,000 −−−−−− Women : PSA 10; 16 players - $10,000	20–23 December	(Spain) Iker Pajares; 11–5, 13–11, 11–4	(Hong Kong) Wong Chi Him	(Australia) Rex Hedrick (Spain) Edmon López	(Malaysia) Sanjay Singh (Malaysia) Mohd Syafiq Kamal (Malaysia) Valentino Bong (Malaysia) Addeen Idrakie
Malaysian Squash Tour VII; Kuching, Malaysia; Men : PSA 10; 16 players - $10,000 −−−−−− Women : PSA 10; 16 players - $10,000	20–23 December	(Malaysia) Teh Min Jie; 11–7, 7–11, 9–11, 11–9, 11–5	(Malaysia) Rachel Arnold	(Malaysia) Aika Azman (Malaysia) Sivasangari Subramaniam	(Malaysia) Chan Yiwen (Malaysia) Nazihah Hanis (Malaysia) Ooi Kah Yan (Malaysia) Teh Min Ern

=== January ===
Tournament	Date	Champion	Runner-Up	Semifinalists	Quarterfinalists
President Gold Cup International; Islamabad, Pakistan; Men : PSA 25; 16 players - $25,000	3–6 January	(Pakistan) Farhan Mehboob; 11–4, 11–4, 8–11, 12–10	(Hong Kong) Leo Au	(Egypt) Karim Ali Fathi (Egypt) Mohammed Reda	(Pakistan) Farhan Zaman (Pakistan) Israr Ahmed (Egypt) Karim El Hammamy (Hong Kong) Yip Tsz Fung
Delaware Pro Singles; Greenville, United States; Men : PSA 5; 16 players - $5,000	5–8 January	(England) Eddie Charlton; 11–9, 11–5, 4–11, 11–6	(England) Adam Murrills	(France) Baptiste Masotti (Pakistan) Syed Hamzah Bukhari	(United States) Gilly Lane (Canada) Cameron Seth (Bermuda) Micah Franklin (Pakistan) Aurangzeb Mehmund
Conseil General du Gard Ville de Nimes; Nîmes, France; Men : PSA 5; 16 players - $5,000	6–8 January	(Germany) Jens Schoor; 11–3, 11–5, 11–5	(Czech Republic) Daniel Mekbib	(Scotland) Douglas Kempsell (Switzerland) Dimitri Steinmann	(Israel) Roee Avraham (England) Robert Dadds (Czech Republic) Martin Švec (England) Connor Sheen
J.P. Morgan Tournament of Champions; New York City, United States; Men : World Series; 32 players - $150,000 - Draw −−−−−− Women : World Series; 32 players - $150,000 - Draw	12–19 January	(Egypt) Karim Abdel Gawad; 6–11, 11–6, 12–10, 11–6	(France) Grégory Gaultier	(Egypt) Mohamed El Shorbagy (England) James Willstrop	(Egypt) Marwan El Shorbagy (Egypt) Tarek Momen (New Zealand) Paul Coll (Germany) Simon Rösner
J.P. Morgan Tournament of Champions; New York City, United States; Men : World Series; 32 players - $150,000 - Draw −−−−−− Women : World Series; 32 players - $150,000 - Draw	12–19 January	(France) Camille Serme; 13–11, 8–11, 4–11, 11–3, 11–7	(England) Laura Massaro	(Egypt) Nour El Sherbini (England) Sarah-Jane Perry	(Malaysia) Nicol David (Egypt) Nouran Gohar (Egypt) Omneya Abdel Kawy (Egypt) Raneem El Weleily
Corporation Service Delaware Open; Greenville, United States; Women : PSA 10; 16 players - $10,000	19–22 January	(Egypt) Kanzy El Defrawy; 11–8, 11–9, 11–8	(Australia) Sarah Cardwell	(Australia) Tamika Saxby (Canada) Samantha Cornett	(Canada) Danielle Letourneau (Canada) Nikki Todd (England) Georgina Stoker (France) Chloé Mesic
Malaysian Squash Tour VIII; Seri Menanti, Malaysia; Men : PSA 5; 16 players - $5,000 −−−−−− Women : PSA 5; 16 players - $5,000	24–27 January	(Hong Kong) Wong Chi Him; 11–2, 7–11, 4–11, 11–1, 11–4	(England) Chris Fuller	(Malaysia) Addeen Idrakie (Hong Kong) Tsun Hei Yuen	(Hong Kong) Henry Leung (Hong Kong) Alex Lau (Hong Kong) Chris Lo (Malaysia) Marcus Sim
Malaysian Squash Tour VIII; Seri Menanti, Malaysia; Men : PSA 5; 16 players - $5,000 −−−−−− Women : PSA 5; 16 players - $5,000	24–27 January	(Hong Kong) Tong Tsz Wing; 11–4, 3–11, 11–3, 11–8	(Malaysia) Andrea Lee	(Hong Kong) Ho Tze-Lok (Hong Kong) Vanessa Chu	(Hong Kong) Lee Ka Yi (Malaysia) Chan Yiwen (Malaysia) Nazihah Hanis (Malaysia) Teh Min Jie
Linear Logistics Pro-Am; Calgary, Canada; Men : PSA 10; 16 players - $10,000	26–29 January	(Canada) Andrew Schnell; 11–9, 3–11, 11–6, 10–12, 11–4	(Netherlands) Piëdro Schweertman	(England) Angus Gillams (Canada) Nick Sachvie	(England) Ashley Davies (Canada) Shawn Delierre (Colombia) Juan Camilo Vargas (New Zealand) Lance Beddoes
PSA Toulouse; Blagnac, France; Men : PSA 10; 16 players - $10,000	26–29 January	(England) Richie Fallows; 11–9, 11–8, 11–4	(Denmark) Kristian Frost	(Belgium) Jan Van Den Herrewegen (England) Patrick Rooney	(India) Mahesh Mangaonkar (Germany) Jens Schoor (France) Baptiste Masotti (France) Geoffrey Demont
Savcor Finnish Open; Mikkeli, Finland; Men : PSA 5; 16 players - $5,000	26–29 January	(Finland) Jami Äijänen; 12–10, 5–11, 11–6, 11–13, 11–7	(England) George Parker	(Austria) Aqeel Rehman (Finland) Jaakko Vähämaa	(Portugal) Rui Soares (Finland) Matias Tuomi (England) Kyle Finch (England) Connor Sheen
Edinburgh Sports Club Open; Edinburgh, Scotland; Women : PSA 5; 16 players - $5,000	27–29 January	(England) Julianne Courtice; 11–3, 11–8, 9–11, 11–5	(Egypt) Menna Hamed	(Belgium) Tinne Gilis (Scotland) Lisa Aitken	(Spain) Cristina Gómez (Scotland) Alison Thomson (France) Énora Villard (Germany) Sina Kandra
Suburban Collection Motor City Open; Detroit, United States; Men : PSA 70; 16 players - $70,000 - Draw	27–30 January	(Australia) Ryan Cuskelly; 4–11, 11–5, 11–5, 11–9	(Egypt) Ali Farag	(South Africa) Stephen Coppinger (Peru) Diego Elías	(Mexico) César Salazar (Egypt) Omar Mosaad (Colombia) Miguel Ángel Rodríguez (Egypt) Marwan El Shorbagy
Bahl & Gaynor Cincinnati Cup; Cincinnati, United States; Women : PSA 10; 16 players - $10,000	27–30 January	(Egypt) Kanzy El Defrawy; 7–11, 11–8, 8–11, 11–8, 14–12	(Egypt) Zeina Mickawy	(Egypt) Nada Abbas (Australia) Tamika Saxby	(United States) Haley Mendez (Egypt) Rowan Elaraby (Canada) Hollie Naughton (Pakistan) Sadia Gul

=== February ===
Tournament	Date	Champion	Runner-Up	Semifinalists	Quarterfinalists
Bitar Cosmetics Play Squash Open; McLean, United States; Men : PSA 5; 16 players - $5,000	1–4 February	(England) Adam Murrills; 11–9, 11–5, 5–11, 11–6	(England) Ashley Davies	(England) Eddie Charlton (England) Reuben Phillips	(Nigeria) Babatunde Ajagbe (United States) Faraz Khan (Canada) David Baillargeon (United States) David Cromwell
UCS Swedish Open; Linköping, Sweden; Men : PSA 70; 16 players - $70,000 - Draw	2–5 February	(France) Grégory Gaultier; 7–11, 11–3, 11–0, 11–8	(Egypt) Karim Abdel Gawad	(Scotland) Alan Clyne (Germany) Simon Rösner	(Australia) Cameron Pilley (France) Mathieu Castagnet (England) Daryl Selby (Egypt) Tarek Momen
Three Rivers Capital Pittsburgh Open; Pittsburgh, United States; Men : PSA 25; 16 players - $25,000	2–5 February	(Egypt) Zahed Mohamed; 12–10, 11–9, 7–11, 11–7	(Malaysia) Ivan Yuen	(Qatar) Abdulla Al-Tamimi (New Zealand) Campbell Grayson	(Wales) Peter Creed (United States) Todd Harrity (Australia) Rex Hedrick (Mexico) Alfredo Ávila
Winnipeg Winter Club Open; Winnipeg, Canada; Women : PSA 10; 16 players - $10,000	2–5 February	(Canada) Samantha Cornett; 12–10, 11–7, 3–11, 11–7	(Egypt) Zeina Mickawy	(Canada) Danielle Letourneau (Australia) Sarah Cardwell	(Canada) Nikki Todd (France) Laura Pomportes (Egypt) Nada Abbas (United States) Reyna Pacheco
Holtrand Open; Medicine Hat, Canada; Men : PSA 25; 16 players - $25,000	9–12 February	(Hong Kong) Yip Tsz Fung; 8–11, 11–8, 8–11, 12–10, 12–10	(Qatar) Abdulla Al-Tamimi	(Peru) Diego Elías (Hong Kong) Leo Au	(Wales) Joel Makin (Egypt) Karim El Hammamy (England) Charles Sharpes (England) Nathan Lake
Life Time Atlanta Open; Atlanta, United States; Men : PSA 10; 16 players - $10,000	9–12 February	(Canada) Shawn Delierre; 11–7, 4–11, 12–10, 11–6	(Australia) Rex Hedrick	(Finland) Henrik Mustonen (England) Angus Gillams	(United States) Faraz Khan (Mexico) Jesús Camacho (England) Eddie Charlton (England) Reuben Phillips
Open d'Italia; Riccione, Italy; Men : PSA 5; 16 players - $5,000	16–19 February	(Egypt) Youssef Ibrahim; 11–8, 7–11, 11–7, 11–8	(France) Baptiste Masotti	(England) Patrick Rooney (Italy) Yuri Farneti	(Spain) Bernat Jaume (England) Nick Mulvey (England) George Parker (Czech Republic) Daniel Mekbib
Cronimet Open; Skellefteå, Sweden; Men : PSA 5; 16 players - $5,000	16–19 February	(Jordan) Mohammad Alsarraj; 6–11, 11–3, 11–13, 11–8, 11–5	(Scotland) Douglas Kempsell	(France) Auguste Dussourd (Finland) Matias Tuomi	(Finland) Jami Äijänen (England) Joe Green (Norway) Adrian Østbye (England) Mark Fuller
Cleveland Classic; Cleveland, United States; Women : PSA 50; 16 players - $50,000 - Draw	17–20 February	(France) Camille Serme; 10–12, 9–11, 11–7, 11–8, 11–7	(England) Alison Waters	(England) Sarah-Jane Perry (England) Emily Whitlock	(Wales) Tesni Evans (England) Victoria Lust (India) Joshna Chinappa (Egypt) Nour El Tayeb
Guilfoyle Financial PSA Squash Classic; Toronto, Canada; Men : PSA 5; 16 players - $5,000	22–25 February	(Argentina) Leandro Romiglio; 11–6, 11–6, 11–3	(France) Geoffrey Demont	(Italy) Stéphane Galifi (Canada) David Baillargeon	(England) Anthony Graham (Canada) Graeme Schnell (Argentina) Robertino Pezzota (Trinidad and Tobago) Kale Wilson
Mount Royal University Open; Calgary, Canada; Men : PSA 5; 16 players - $5,000	23–26 February	(Mexico) Eric Gálvez; 11–9, 11–3, 8–11, 5–11, 11–7	(Canada) Andrew Schnell	(France) Auguste Dussourd (England) Charlie Johnson	(Colombia) Andrés Herrera (Finland) Matias Tuomi (Republic of Ireland) Stu Hadden (England) Mark Broekman
Guggenheim Partners & Equitrust Windy City Open; Chicago, United States; Men : World Series; 32 players - $150,000 - Draw −−−−−− Women : World Series; 32 players - $150,000 - Draw	23 Feb.–1 Mar.	(France) Grégory Gaultier; 5–11, 11–8, 11–2, 11–4	(Egypt) Marwan El Shorbagy	(Egypt) Ali Farag (Spain) Borja Golán	(Egypt) Mohamed El Shorbagy (Germany) Simon Rösner (England) James Willstrop (Egypt) Karim Abdel Gawad
Guggenheim Partners & Equitrust Windy City Open; Chicago, United States; Men : World Series; 32 players - $150,000 - Draw −−−−−− Women : World Series; 32 players - $150,000 - Draw	23 Feb.–1 Mar.	(Egypt) Raneem El Weleily; 10–12, 11–7, 11–7, 11–7	(Egypt) Nour El Sherbini	(France) Camille Serme (Egypt) Nouran Gohar	(Malaysia) Nicol David (England) Alison Waters (United States) Amanda Sobhy (England) Laura Massaro

=== March ===
Tournament	Date	Champion	Runner-Up	Semifinalists	Quarterfinalists
Oregon Open; Portland, United States; Men : PSA 15; 16 players - $15,000	1–4 March	(Finland) Olli Tuominen; 8–11, 15–13, 11–7, 11–4	(United States) Todd Harrity	(Germany) Raphael Kandra (Argentina) Leandro Romiglio	(India) Vikram Malhotra (Mexico) Arturo Salazar (United States) Christopher Gordon (Finland) Henrik Mustonen
Texas Open; Dallas, United States; Women : PSA 35; 16 players - $35,000 - Draw	2–5 March	(Hong Kong) Annie Au; 11–6, 7–11, 11–5, 5–11, 11–8	(Australia) Donna Urquhart	(England) Millie Tomlinson (New Zealand) Joelle King	(Canada) Danielle Letourneau (England) Jenny Duncalf (Egypt) Kanzy El Defrawy (France) Coline Aumard
Riga Ladies Open; Riga, Latvia; Women : PSA 5; 16 players - $5,000	3–5 March	(Egypt) Menna Hamed; 11–9, 11–6, 17–15	(England) Victoria Temple-Murray	(France) Chloé Mesic (England) Julianne Courtice	(France) Énora Villard (Netherlands) Tessa Ter Sluis (Finland) Riina Koskinen (Latvia) Ineta Mackeviča
Brisbane City Squash Sandgate Open; Sandgate, Australia; Women : PSA 5; 16 players - $5,000	3–5 March	(Hong Kong) Ho Tze-Lok; 11–8, 12–10, 11–8	(Hong Kong) Vanessa Chu	(Australia) Lisa Camilleri (Australia) Samantha Foyle	(Australia) Jessica Turnbull (South Korea) Choi Yu-ra (Australia) Moana Gray (New Zealand) Emma Millar
Canary Wharf Classic; London, England; Men : PSA 70; 16 players - $70,000 - Draw	6–10 March	(England) Nick Matthew; 11–9, 11–7, 10–12, 11–8	(Egypt) Fares Dessouky	(New Zealand) Paul Coll (Spain) Borja Golán	(Australia) Cameron Pilley (England) Daryl Selby (France) Mathieu Castagnet (France) Lucas Serme
Ciudad de Floridablanca; Floridablanca, Colombia; Women : PSA 70; 16 players - $70,000 - Draw	8–11 March	(Malaysia) Nicol David; 11–3, 11–4, 11–8	(United States) Olivia Blatchford	(United States) Amanda Sobhy (England) Alison Waters	(Wales) Tesni Evans (England) Emily Whitlock (England) Victoria Lust (Hong Kong) Joey Chan
Perrier Challenge Cup; Hong Kong; Men : PSA 5; 16 players - $5,000 −−−−−− Women : PSA 5; 16 players - $5,000	8–11 March	(Hong Kong) Wong Chi Him; 11–7, 11–4, 11–3	(Hong Kong) Tang Ming Hong	(Chinese Taipei) James Huang (Hong Kong) Henry Leung	(Hong Kong) Tsun Hei Yuen (Hong Kong) Alex Lau (Philippines) Robert Garcia (Hong Kong) Yeung Ho Wai
Perrier Challenge Cup; Hong Kong; Men : PSA 5; 16 players - $5,000 −−−−−− Women : PSA 5; 16 players - $5,000	8–11 March	(Hong Kong) Ho Tze-Lok; 12–10, 11–4, 11–7	(Hong Kong) Vanessa Chu	(Malaysia) Andrea Lee (Malaysia) Teh Min Jie	(Hong Kong) Lui Hiu Lam (Hong Kong) Carmen Lee (Philippines) Jemyca Aribado (India) Sunayna Kuruvilla
Pure Blonde Elanora Open; Sydney, Australia; Men : PSA 5; 16 players - $5,000	10–12 March	(Australia) Zac Alexander; 11–2, 11–6, 11–6	(Australia) Joshua Larkin	(Australia) Matthew Hopkin (Australia) Rhys Dowling	(Indonesia) Vivian Rhamanan (New Zealand) Luke Jones (Australia) Solayman Nowrozi (Australia) Thomas Calvert
Wimbledon Squared Open; London, England; Men : PSA 25; 16 players - $25,000	14–17 March	(Scotland) Alan Clyne; 11–3, 11–9, 11–6	(England) Tom Richards	(India) Saurav Ghosal (Malaysia) Nafiizwan Adnan	(England) Joe Lee (England) Jaymie Haycocks (India) Mahesh Mangaonkar (India) Vikram Malhotra
Annecy PSA Open; Seynod, France; Men : PSA 5; 16 players - $5,000	16–19 March	(France) Benjamin Aubert; 11–9, 6–11, 11–9, 11–9	(France) Baptiste Masotti	(Wales) Emyr Evans (England) Adam Auckland	(Austria) Aqeel Rehman (France) Enzo Corigliano (France) Victor Crouin (Switzerland) Luca Wilhelmi
Allam British Open; Hull, England; Men : World Series; 32 players - $150,000 - Draw −−−−−− Women : World Series; 32 players - $150,000 - Draw	21–26 March	(France) Grégory Gaultier; 8–11, 11–7, 11–3, 11–3	(England) Nick Matthew	(Egypt) Mohamed El Shorbagy (Egypt) Ramy Ashour	(Egypt) Ali Farag (Egypt) Tarek Momen (France) Mathieu Castagnet (Egypt) Mohamed Abouelghar
Allam British Open; Hull, England; Men : World Series; 32 players - $150,000 - Draw −−−−−− Women : World Series; 32 players - $150,000 - Draw	21–26 March	(England) Laura Massaro; 11–8, 11–8, 6–11, 11–6	(England) Sarah-Jane Perry	(Egypt) Nour El Sherbini (Malaysia) Nicol David	(England) Emily Whitlock (Egypt) Raneem El Weleily (Australia) Donna Urquhart (France) Camille Serme
Manitoba Open; Winnipeg, Canada; Men : PSA 15; 16 players - $15,000	23–26 March	(Mexico) Arturo Salazar; 11–6, 11–7, 13–11	(England) Ben Coleman	(England) Joshua Masters (Egypt) Youssef Soliman	(Jamaica) Christopher Binnie (Egypt) Karim El Hammamy (Spain) Iker Pajares (Netherlands) Piëdro Schweertman
Hampshire Open; Southampton, England; Men : PSA 5; 16 players - $5,000	23–26 March	(England) George Parker; 11–3, 9–11, 11–9, 7–11, 11–6	(England) Chris Fuller	(England) Michael Harris (Malaysia) Addeen Idrakie	(Pakistan) Israr Ahmed (New Zealand) Evan Williams (England) Charlie Lee (England) Mark Fuller
Montréal Open; Montreal, Canada; Men : PSA 25; 16 players - $25,000	28–31 March	(Mexico) César Salazar; 11–8, 16–14, 11–6	(Egypt) Omar Abdel Meguid	(India) Saurav Ghosal (England) Adrian Waller	(Mexico) Arturo Salazar (Canada) Nick Sachvie (France) Lucas Serme (Finland) Olli Tuominen
TRAC Oil & Gas North of Scotland Open; Aberdeen, Scotland; Men : PSA 10; 16 players - $10,000	30 Mar.–2 Apr.	(India) Vikram Malhotra; 3–11, 11–8, 6–11, 13–11, 11–4	(India) Mahesh Mangaonkar	(England) Richie Fallows (Malaysia) Eain Yow	(Scotland) Douglas Kempsell (Malaysia) Addeen Idrakie (Belgium) Jan Van Den Herrewegen (New Zealand) Evan Williams
Christchurch Vets Ipswich Open; Ipswich, England; Women : PSA 5; 16 players - $5,000	30 Mar.–2 Apr.	(England) Julianne Courtice; 11–7, 12–14, 11–5, 11–6	(Egypt) Hana Moataz	(England) Rachael Chadwick (Scotland) Alison Thomson	(France) Élise Romba (Wales) Deon Saffery (Latvia) Ineta Mackeviča (Netherlands) Tessa ter Sluis
DPD/FOS Amsterdam Open; Amsterdam, Netherlands; Men : PSA 5; 16 players - $5,000	31 Mar.–2 Apr.	(Jordan) Mohammad Al-Saraj; 11–8, 8–11, 11–5, 13–11	(England) Lyell Fuller	(Pakistan) Ahsan Ayaz (Wales) Emyr Evans	(Finland) Miko Äijänen (Netherlands) Bart Ravelli (United States) Dylan Cunningham (Israel) Roee Avraham

=== April ===
Tournament	Date	Champion	Runner-Up	Semifinalists	Quarterfinalists
The Masters School Open; Dobbs Ferry, United States; Women : PSA 5; 16 players - $5,000	5–8 April	(South Africa) Elani Landman; 4–11, 11–6, 11–7, 11–9	(France) Énora Villard	(Mexico) Diana García (Brazil) Thaisa Serafini	(United States) Marina Stefanoni (Egypt) Raneem El Torky (Malaysia) Nessrine Ariffin (South Africa) Lume Landman
PSA Women's World Championship; El Gouna, Egypt; Women : World Championship; 32 players - $165,000 - Draw	7–14 April (Previously scheduled for 2016)	(Egypt) Nour El Sherbini; 11–8, 11–9, 11–9	(Egypt) Raneem El Weleily	(Egypt) Nouran Gohar (France) Camille Serme	(England) Sarah-Jane Perry (Malaysia) Nicol David (England) Laura Massaro (India) Joshna Chinappa
El Gouna International; El Gouna, Egypt; Men : World Series; 32 players - $150,000 - Draw	7–14 April (Previously scheduled for 2016)	(France) Grégory Gaultier; 11–6, 11–8, 11–7	(Egypt) Karim Abdel Gawad	(Egypt) Marwan El Shorbagy (Egypt) Fares Dessouky	(Egypt) Mohamed El Shorbagy (New Zealand) Paul Coll (Peru) Diego Elías (Germany) Simon Rösner
Assore & Balwin Parkview Open; Johannesburg, South Africa; Men : PSA 5; 16 players - $5,000 −−−−−− Women : PSA 5; 16 players - $5,000	10–13 April	(Egypt) Mohamed ElSherbini; 11–8, 11–7, 10–12, 11–8	(India) Velavan Senthilkumar	(England) Mark Fuller (India) Harinder Pal Sandhu	(South Africa) Christo Potgieter (South Africa) Ruan Olivier (South Africa) Gareth Naidoo (Austria) Aqeel Rehman
Assore & Balwin Parkview Open; Johannesburg, South Africa; Men : PSA 5; 16 players - $5,000 −−−−−− Women : PSA 5; 16 players - $5,000	10–13 April	(South Africa) Alexandra Fuller; 14–12, 7–11, 11–9, 11–7	(South Africa) Milnay Louw	(Canada) Nikki Todd (South Africa) Cheyna Tucker	(India) Sunayna Kuruvilla (South Africa) Adel Sammons (South Africa) Makgosi Peloakgosi (South Africa) Mikaila Westmoreland
Virginia Squash Association Richmond Open; Richmond, United States; Women : PSA 5; 16 players - $5,000	13–15 April	(Egypt) Rowan Elaraby; 11–6, 12–10, 11–6	(Canada) Nicole Bunyan	(Pakistan) Maria Toorpakay (England) Anna Kimberley	(France) Énora Villard (South Africa) Lume Landman (Pakistan) Sadia Gul (South Africa) Elani Landman
Garavan's West of Ireland Open; Galway, Republic of Ireland; Men : PSA 10; 16 players - $10,000	13–16 April	(Egypt) Youssef Soliman; 11–4, 7–11, 11–3, 11–9	(Germany) Jens Schoor	(Egypt) Mazen Gamal (Czech Republic) Daniel Mekbib	(England) Joshua Masters (Egypt) Shehab Essam (Republic of Ireland) Brian Byrne (France) Geoffrey Demont
BCS Russian Open; Moscow, Russia; Men : PSA 5; 16 players - $5,000	14–16 April	(England) Adam Murrills; 11–9, 11–5, 11–5	(Finland) Miko Äijänen	(Finland) Jami Äijänen (Israel) Daniel Poleshchuk	(Israel) Roee Avraham (Wales) Owain Taylor (England) Laurence Green (Sweden) Michael Babra
Czech International Championship; Prague, Czech Republic; Women : PSA 5; 16 players - $5,000	15–16 April	(Egypt) Amina Yousry; 11–6, 11–7, 11–8	(Belgium) Tinne Gilis	(Scotland) Lisa Aitken (Netherlands) Tessa Ter Sluis	(England) Kace Bartley (Czech Republic) Eva Feřteková (Wales) Ali Hemingway (Egypt) Farah Momen
West Rand Open; Roodepoort, South Africa; Men : PSA 5; 16 players - $5,000	18–21 April	(Egypt) Mohamed ElSherbini; 11–3, 11–8, 11–3	(India) Velavan Senthilkumar	(South Africa) Tristan Eysele (England) Mark Fuller	(India) Harinder Pal Sandhu (England) Lyell Fuller (France) Benjamin Aubert (South Africa) Ruan Olivier
Persian Gulf Championship; Kish Island, Iran; Men : PSA 5; 16 players - $5,000	19–21 April	(Pakistan) Tayyab Aslam; 9–11, 11–7, 10–12, 11–7, 11–8	(Hong Kong) Henry Leung	(Hong Kong) Chris Lo (Iran) Sajad Zareian	(Hong Kong) Tang Ming Hong (Iran) Navid Maleksabet (Iran) Soheil Shameli (Iran) Mohammad Kashani
GillenMarkets Irish Squash Open; Dublin, Republic of Ireland; Men : PSA 15; 16 players - $15,000 −−−−−− Women : PSA 15; 16 players - $15,000	19–22 April	(England) Declan James; 11–9, 6–11, 3–11, 11–5, 11–8	(England) Adrian Waller	(Egypt) Mazen Gamal (Egypt) Youssef Soliman	(Qatar) Abdulla Al-Tamimi (United States) Todd Harrity (Egypt) Shehab Essam (England) Ben Coleman
GillenMarkets Irish Squash Open; Dublin, Republic of Ireland; Men : PSA 15; 16 players - $15,000 −−−−−− Women : PSA 15; 16 players - $15,000	19–22 April	(Belgium) Nele Gilis; 2–11, 11–8, 7–11, 11–9, 11–4	(England) Millie Tomlinson	(England) Julianne Courtice (Netherlands) Milou van der Heijden	(New Zealand) Amanda Landers-Murphy (Mexico) Samantha Terán (Egypt) Hana Ramadan (France) Chloé Mesic
Seapiax Lorient Open; Larmor-Plage, France; Men : PSA 5; 16 players - $5,000	19–22 April	(Spain) Iker Pajares; 11–7, 11–5, 11–7	(Czech Republic) Martin Švec	(England) Miles Jenkins (Spain) Edmon López	(France) Victor Crouin (England) Matthew Broadberry (Wales) Emyr Evans (France) Sébastien Bonmalais
Life Time HUTKAY.fit Houston Open; Houston, United States; Men : PSA 70; 16 players - $70,000 - Draw	19–23 April	(Egypt) Karim Abdel Gawad; 11–6, 5–11, 11–8, 11–6	(Egypt) Tarek Momen	(Egypt) Fares Dessouky (Egypt) Mohamed Abouelghar	(Australia) Ryan Cuskelly (New Zealand) Paul Coll (Colombia) Miguel Ángel Rodríguez (Egypt) Mazen Hesham
Northern Ontario Open; Sudbury, Canada; Men : PSA 10; 16 players - $10,000	19–22 April	(Canada) Nick Sachvie; 14–12, 11–6, 11–3	(Jamaica) Christopher Binnie	(United States) Christopher Gordon (Spain) Hugo Varela	(France) Baptiste Masotti (Canada) Michael McCue (France) Christophe André (Canada) David Baillargeon
Madison Open; Madison, United States; Men : PSA 10; 16 players - $10,000	20–23 April	(Mexico) Jesús Camacho; 11–4, 11–7, 10–12, 8–11, 13–11	(Netherlands) Piëdro Schweertman	(England) Patrick Rooney (United States) Chris Hanson	(Mexico) Eric Gálvez (England) Anthony Graham (Pakistan) Shahjahan Khan (United States) Faraz Khan
Cross Court/SVSL Sacramento Rubin Open; Woodland, United States; Men : PSA 5; 16 players - $5,000	20–23 April	(Mexico) Edgar Zayas; 11–9, 4–11, 9–11, 11–9, 11–3	(England) Charlie Johnson	(England) Kyle Finch (Mexico) Leonel Cardenas	(England) Scott Young (Mexico) Alejandro Reyes (Italy) Stéphane Galifi (United States) Cole Becker
Sentara Martha Jefferson Charlottesville Open; Charlottesville, United States; Women : PSA 10; 16 players - $10,000	21–23 April	(Egypt) Rowan Elaraby; 7–11, 11–6, 7–11, 11–6, 11–9	(Canada) Danielle Letourneau	(Hong Kong) Ho Tze-Lok (United States) Haley Mendez	(Finland) Emilia Soini (Hong Kong) Lee Ka Yi (Hong Kong) Vanessa Chu (Canada) Nicole Bunyan
Keith Grainger Memorial UCT Open; Cape Town, South Africa; Men : PSA 5; 32 players - $5,000 −−−−−− Women : PSA 5; 16 players - $5,000	25–28 April	(Egypt) Mohamed ElSherbini; 11–2, 11–2, 11–3	(South Africa) Tristan Eysele	(South Africa) Rodney Durbach (South Africa) Gary Wheadon	(France) Auguste Dussourd (Belgium) Joeri Hapers (England) Mark Fuller (South Korea) Woo Chang-wook
Keith Grainger Memorial UCT Open; Cape Town, South Africa; Men : PSA 5; 32 players - $5,000 −−−−−− Women : PSA 5; 16 players - $5,000	25–28 April	(Egypt) Menna Hamed; 4–11, 6–11, 11–6, 11–6, 11–3	(South Africa) Alexandra Fuller	(Canada) Nikki Todd (Egypt) Menna Nasser	(France) Élise Romba (Latvia) Ineta Mackeviča (South Africa) Cheyna Tucker (South Africa) Juanette Le Roux
Patagonia Open; Villa La Angostura, Argentina; Men : PSA 5; 16 players - $5,000	26–29 April	(Argentina) Robertino Pezzota; 11–9, 11–9, 9–11, 11–6	(Argentina) Rodrigo Pezzota	(Mexico) Bryan Cueto (Argentina) Gonzalo Miranda	(Argentina) Ignacio Gutiérrez (Colombia) Andrés Herrera (England) Alex Noakes (Brazil) Victor Gornati

=== May ===
Tournament	Date	Champion	Runner-Up	Semifinalists	Quarterfinalists
Grasshopper Cup; Zürich, Switzerland; Men : PSA 100; 16 players - $100,000 - Draw	3–7 May	(France) Grégory Gaultier; 11–8, 11–9, 14–12	(Egypt) Ali Farag	(England) Nick Matthew (Egypt) Tarek Momen	(Egypt) Mohamed El Shorbagy (Egypt) Omar Mosaad (Germany) Simon Rösner (Egypt) Karim Abdel Gawad
Mar del Plata Open; Mar del Plata, Argentina; Men : PSA 10; 16 players - $10,000	3–6 May	(England) Angus Gillams; 7–11, 8–11, 11–8, 11–8, 11–8	(France) Christophe André	(Argentina) Leandro Romiglio (England) Joe Green	(Argentina) Robertino Pezzota (Czech Republic) Martin Švec (Argentina) Juan Pablo Roude (Mexico) Juan Gómez Domínguez
Abu Dhabi Open; Abu Dhabi, United Arab Emirates; Men : PSA 5; 16 players - $5,000	3–6 May	(India) Vikram Malhotra; 6–11, 11–4, 11–3, 9–11, 13–11	(Egypt) Youssef Ibrahim	(Jordan) Mohammad Al-Saraj (Pakistan) Khawaja Adil Maqbool	(Pakistan) Tayyab Aslam (Kuwait) Ammar Al-Tamimi (Pakistan) Israr Ahmed (Jordan) Ahmad Al-Saraj
Bull Ring Open Squash Championships; Johannesburg, South Africa; Men : PSA 5; 16 players - $5,000 −−−−−− Women : PSA 5; 16 players - $5,000	3–6 May	(Egypt) Mohamed ElSherbini; 11–4, 11–8, 11–2	(England) Kyle Finch	(France) Benjamin Aubert (South Africa) Christo Potgieter	(South Africa) Jean-Pierre Brits (France) Enzo Corigliano (England) Mark Fuller (Egypt) Omar Bahgat
Bull Ring Open Squash Championships; Johannesburg, South Africa; Men : PSA 5; 16 players - $5,000 −−−−−− Women : PSA 5; 16 players - $5,000	3–6 May	(Egypt) Menna Hamed; 7–11, 11–5, 11–7, 11–8	(South Africa) Milnay Louw	(Latvia) Ineta Mackeviča (South Africa) Alexandra Fuller	(Switzerland) Nadia Pfister (South Africa) Cheyna Tucker (South Africa) Alexa Pienaar (France) Élise Romba
Jersey Squash Classic; Saint Clement, Jersey; Men : PSA 5; 16 players - $5,000 −−−−−− Women : PSA 5; 16 players - $5,000	3–6 May	(Spain) Iker Pajares; 9–11, 11–2, 11–3, 11–3	(England) Jaymie Haycocks	(Portugal) Rui Soares (Wales) Emyr Evans	(England) Miles Jenkins (South Africa) Tristan Eysele (England) Nick Mulvey (Finland) Matias Tuomi
Jersey Squash Classic; Saint Clement, Jersey; Men : PSA 5; 16 players - $5,000 −−−−−− Women : PSA 5; 16 players - $5,000	3–6 May	(Netherlands) Milou van der Heijden; 11–4, 11–7, 9–11, 11–9	(Scotland) Lisa Aitken	(England) Julianne Courtice (Scotland) Alison Thomson	(England) Kace Bartley (England) Lucy Turmel (Netherlands) Tessa Ter Sluis (Switzerland) Marija Shpakova
Regatas Resistencia Open; Resistencia, Argentina; Men : PSA 10; 16 players - $10,000	10–13 May	(Argentina) Robertino Pezzota; 11–8, 11–7, 11–4	(United States) Christopher Gordon	(England) Angus Gillams (Argentina) Leandro Romiglio	(Canada) David Baillargeon (Mexico) Miled Zarazúa (Mexico) Juan Gómez Domínguez (England) Joe Green
Malaysian Squash Tour IX; Kuala Lumpur, Malaysia; Men : PSA 5; 16 players - $5,000 −−−−−− Women : PSA 5; 16 players - $5,000	10–13 May	(India) Harinder Pal Sandhu; 11–6, 11–7, ret.	(Hong Kong) Henry Leung	(Hong Kong) Tang Ming Hong (Malaysia) Mohd Syafiq Kamal	(Taiwan) James Huang (Pakistan) Amaad Fareed (Malaysia) Valentino Bong (India) Ravi Dixit
Malaysian Squash Tour IX; Kuala Lumpur, Malaysia; Men : PSA 5; 16 players - $5,000 −−−−−− Women : PSA 5; 16 players - $5,000	10–13 May	(Malaysia) Rachel Arnold; 11–9, 11–9, 9–11, 2–11, 11–9	(Japan) Satomi Watanabe	(Malaysia) Teh Min Jie (Malaysia) Aifa Azman	(Malaysia) Aika Azman (Wales) Deon Saffery (Malaysia) Chan Yiwen (Malaysia) Ooi Kah Yan
Austrian Open; Salzburg, Austria; Men : PSA 5; 16 players - $5,000	10–13 May	(Austria) Aqeel Rehman; 11–7, 6–11, 1–11, 11–8, 11–9	(Jamaica) Christopher Binnie	(Jordan) Mohammad Al-Saraj (Spain) Edmon López	(Scotland) Rory Stewart (Finland) Miko Äijänen (Norway) Adrian Østbye (Switzerland) Dimitri Steinmann
Mid Atlantic Pro Classic; Washington, United States; Men : PSA 5; 16 players - $5,000	11–13 May	(Pakistan) Syed Hamzah Bukhari; 11–8, 13–11, 3–11, 14–12	(England) Anthony Graham	(Italy) Stéphane Galifi (United States) Faraz Khan	(United States) Nosherwan Khan (Bermuda) Micah Franklin (Scotland) Jon Geekie (Canada) Thomas King
Arnold Homes Tring Open; Tring, England; Men : PSA 15; 16 players - $15,000	11–14 May	(England) Declan James; 4–11, 13–11, 11–7, 11–9	(Scotland) Greg Lobban	(Wales) Joel Makin (Pakistan) Ahsan Ayaz	(United States) Todd Harrity (Finland) Henrik Mustonen (Germany) Raphael Kandra (England) Richie Fallows
NT Open; Darwin, Australia; Men : PSA 10; 16 players - $10,000	11–14 May	(Malaysia) Eain Yow; 7–11, 7–11, 11–4, 11–6, 11–6	(Australia) Joshua Larkin	(Hong Kong) Alex Lau (Malaysia) Addeen Idrakie	(New Zealand) Evan Williams (Australia) Rhys Dowling (Australia) Zac Alexander (Australia) Matthew Hopkin
SYS Open; Southampton, NY, United States; Men : PSA 5; 16 players - $5,000	11–14 May	(India) Ramit Tandon; 7–11, 7–11, 11–4, 11–6, 11–6	(India) Kush Kumar	(United States) Timothy Brownell (South Africa) Clinton Leeuw	(Egypt) Mohamed Nabil (United States) Spencer Lovejoy (Spain) Hugo Varela (Bermuda) Noah Browne
Pacific Market Bellevue Squash Classic; Bellevue, United States; Men : PSA 100; 16 players - $150,000	16–20 May	(France) Grégory Gaultier; 12–10, 12–10, 11–8	(Egypt) Ali Farag	(England) James Willstrop (Egypt) Marwan El Shorbagy	(Egypt) Tarek Momen (Spain) Borja Golán (Australia) Ryan Cuskelly (Egypt) Ramy Ashour
Paraguay Open; Asunción, Paraguay; Men : PSA 10; 16 players - $10,000	17–20 May	(Argentina) Leandro Romiglio; 11–6, 11–6, 6–11, 11–1	(Canada) Shawn Delierre	(England) Angus Gillams (United States) Christopher Gordon	(Argentina) Robertino Pezzota (England) Joe Green (Czech Republic) Martin Švec (Canada) David Baillargeon
Vitesse Stortford Classic; Bishop's Stortford, England; Men : PSA 10; 16 players - $10,000	17–20 May	(Scotland) Greg Lobban; 11–7, 11–3, 8–11, 11–5 (7th PSA title)	(England) George Parker	(England) Richie Fallows (England) Ben Coleman	(England) Jaymie Haycocks (England) Patrick Rooney (Pakistan) Ahsan Ayaz (Jamaica) Christopher Binnie
Open International d'Angers; Angers, France; Men : PSA 5; 16 players - $5,000	17–20 May	(France) Victor Crouin; 5–11, 6–11, 13–11, 11–7, 11–3	(England) Adam Murrills	(Scotland) Rory Stewart (France) Christophe André	(France) Enzo Corigliano (Scotland) Jamie Henderson (Pakistan) Asim Khan (Germany) Valentin Rapp
Sekisui Open; Kriens, Switzerland; Men : PSA 10; 16 players - $10,000 −−−−−− Women : PSA 5; 16 players - $5,000	18–21 May	(Germany) Raphael Kandra; 11–7, 11–5, 11–3	(Egypt) Mazen Gamal	(Switzerland) Dimitri Steinmann (Kuwait) Ammar Al-Tamimi	(Spain) Iker Pajares (Scotland) Douglas Kempsell (Germany) Jens Schoor (Hong Kong) Wong Chi Him
Sekisui Open; Kriens, Switzerland; Men : PSA 10; 16 players - $10,000 −−−−−− Women : PSA 5; 16 players - $5,000	18–21 May	(South Africa) Alexandra Fuller; 10–12, 11–7, 11–7, 3–11,12–10	(England) Julianne Courtice	(Spain) Cristina Gómez (Czech Republic) Anna Serme	(Belgium) Tinne Gilis (France) Énora Villard (Germany) Sina Kandra (Latvia) Ineta Mackeviča
Nissan Open Squash Championships; Makati, Philippines; Men : PSA 5; 16 players - $5,000 −−−−−− Women : PSA 5; 16 players - $5,000	18–21 May	(India) Harinder Pal Sandhu; 11–5, 11–7, 11–7	(Malaysia) Mohd Syafiq Kamal	(Hong Kong) Tang Ming Hong (Malaysia) Elvinn Keo	(Malaysia) Valentino Bong (Hong Kong) Henry Leung (India) Abhay Singh (Hong Kong) Tsun Hei Yuen
Nissan Open Squash Championships; Makati, Philippines; Men : PSA 5; 16 players - $5,000 −−−−−− Women : PSA 5; 16 players - $5,000	18–21 May	(Japan) Satomi Watanabe; 11–9, 8–11, 11–8, 8–11, 15–13	(Wales) Deon Saffery	(Hong Kong) Lee Ka Yi (Malaysia) Rachel Arnold	(Japan) Risa Sugimoto (Philippines) Jemyca Aribado (Malaysia) Ooi Kah Yan (India) Akanksha Salunkhe
Torneo Internacional PSA Sporta; Guatemala City, Guatemala; Men : PSA 50; 16 players - $50,000 - Draw	24–27 May	(Egypt) Mohamed Abouelghar; 11–6, 11–5, 11–3	(Egypt) Zahed Mohamed	(Mexico) César Salazar (Colombia) Miguel Á. Rodríguez	(Hong Kong) Yip Tsz Fung (Egypt) Omar Mosaad (Peru) Diego Elías (Hong Kong) Max Lee
Rhiwbina Welsh Open; Cardiff, Wales; Men : PSA 10; 16 players - $10,000	25–28 May	(England) George Parker; 11–7, 11–3, 11–3	(England) Patrick Rooney	(Wales) Peter Creed (England) Joshua Masters	(Spain) Carlos Cornes (Kuwait) Ammar Al-Tamimi (India) Mahesh Mangaonkar (Pakistan) Ahsan Ayaz
Hasta La Vista Open; Wrocław, Poland; Men : PSA 5; 16 players - $5,000	25–28 May	(Spain) Edmon López; 9–11, 11–3, 11–3, 11–5	(England) Adam Murrills	(Israel) Daniel Poleshchuk (France) Victor Crouin	(England) Nick Mulvey (Scotland) Rory Stewart (Czech Republic) Jakub Solnický (South Korea) Park Jong-myoung
Gibson O'Connor North Shore Open; Auckland, New Zealand; Men : PSA 5; 16 players - $5,000 −−−−−− Women : PSA 5; 16 players - $5,000	26–28 May	(Australia) Joshua Larkin; 11–7, 11–5, 11–7	(New Zealand) Evan Williams	(Malaysia) Valentino Bong (New Zealand) Ben Grindrod	(New Zealand) Chris van der Salm (New Zealand) Luke Jones (England) Bradley Masters (South Korea) Woo Chang-wook
Gibson O'Connor North Shore Open; Auckland, New Zealand; Men : PSA 5; 16 players - $5,000 −−−−−− Women : PSA 5; 16 players - $5,000	26–28 May	(New Zealand) Amanda Landers-Murphy; 11–8, 12–10, 13–15, 8–11, 11–9	(New Zealand) Megan Craig	(Australia) Jessica Turnbull (Philippines) Jemyca Aribado	(New Zealand) Abbie Palmer (Australia) Samantha Foyle (Australia) Christine Nunn (New Zealand) Emma Millar
Costa Rica Open; San José, Costa Rica; Men : PSA 15; 16 players - $15,000	31 May–3 Jun.	(Egypt) Karim Ali Fathy; 11–2, 10–12, 11–7, 11–3	(Mexico) Arturo Salazar	(Mexico) Alfredo Ávila (Pakistan) Farhan Zaman	(India) Vikram Malhotra (Jamaica) Christopher Binnie (Mexico) Jesús Camacho (Canada) Shawn Delierre

=== June ===
Tournament	Date	Champion	Runner-Up	Semifinalists	Quarterfinalists
Madeira Island Open; Funchal, Portugal; Men : PSA 10; 16 players - $10,000	2–4 June	(Egypt) Youssef Soliman; 11–5, 8–11, 11–6, 11–2	(England) Joshua Masters	(Spain) Carlos Cornes (Jordan) Mohammad Al-Saraj	(Germany) Jens Schoor (France) Auguste Dussourd (England) Mark Fuller (England) Patrick Rooney
City of Kalgoorlie & Boulder Golden Open; Kalgoorlie, Australia; Men : PSA 5; 16 players - $5,000 −−−−−− Women : PSA 5; 16 players - $5,000	3–5 June	(Australia) Mike Corren; 16–14, 8–11, 11–9, 11–6	(Australia) Rhys Dowling	(Australia) Thomas Calvert (Australia) Solayman Nowrozi	(Australia) David Ilich (Australia) Courtney West (Australia) Alex Eustace (Australia) Joseph White
City of Kalgoorlie & Boulder Golden Open; Kalgoorlie, Australia; Men : PSA 5; 16 players - $5,000 −−−−−− Women : PSA 5; 16 players - $5,000	3–5 June	(Australia) Tamika Saxby; 7–11, 11–6, 11–4, 11–5	(Australia) Samantha Foyle	(Australia) Zoe Petrovansky (Australia) Amanda Hopps	(Malaysia) Aika Azman (Australia) Taylor Flavell (Australia) Lauren Aspinall (Australia) Cindy Meintjes
PSA World Series Finals; Dubai, United Arab Emirates; Men : World Series Finals; 8 players - $160,000 - Draw −−−−−− Women : World Series Finals; 8 players - $160,000 - Draw	6–10 June	(Egypt) Mohamed El Shorbagy; 12–10, 11–9, 11–8	(England) James Willstrop	(Germany) Simon Rösner (Egypt) Karim Abdel Gawad	(Egypt) Marwan El Shorbagy (Egypt) Ali Farag (England) Nick Matthew (France) Grégory Gaultier
PSA World Series Finals; Dubai, United Arab Emirates; Men : World Series Finals; 8 players - $160,000 - Draw −−−−−− Women : World Series Finals; 8 players - $160,000 - Draw	6–10 June	(England) Laura Massaro; 11–8, 12–10, 11–5	(Egypt) Nour El Sherbini	(France) Camille Serme (Egypt) Nouran Gohar	(England) Sarah-Jane Perry (Egypt) Raneem El Weleily (England) Alison Waters (Malaysia) Nicol David
Fitzherbert Rowe Lawyers NZ International Classic; Palmerston North, New Zealand; Men : PSA 10; 16 players - $10,000 −−−−−− Women : PSA 5; 16 players - $5,000	8–11 June	(Scotland) Greg Lobban; 11–8, 15–13, 11–6 (8th PSA title)	(India) Mahesh Mangaonkar	(Malaysia) Eain Yow (England) Angus Gillams	(Wales) Peter Creed (Malaysia) Mohd Syafiq Kamal (New Zealand) Lance Beddoes (New Zealand) Evan Williams
Fitzherbert Rowe Lawyers NZ International Classic; Palmerston North, New Zealand; Men : PSA 10; 16 players - $10,000 −−−−−− Women : PSA 5; 16 players - $5,000	8–11 June	(Scotland) Lisa Aitken; 11–3, 4–11, 11–9, 11–3	(New Zealand) Emma Millar	(Malaysia) Andrea Lee (Philippines) Jemyca Aribado	(New Zealand) Amanda Landers-Murphy (New Zealand) Kaitlyn Watts (Australia) Jessica Turnbull (Malaysia) Aika Azman
ILT-Community Trust NZ Southern Open; Invercargill, New Zealand; Men : PSA 15; 16 players - $15,000	15–18 June	(Scotland) Greg Lobban; 11–7, 11–6, 3–11, 11–9 (9th PSA title)	(Malaysia) Ivan Yuen	(Wales) Peter Creed (Australia) Rex Hedrick	(India) Mahesh Mangaonkar (New Zealand) Evan Williams (Australia) Joshua Larkin (Malaysia) Eain Yow
Select Gaming Kent Open; Maidstone, England; Men : PSA 10; 16 players - $10,000	15–18 June	(Wales) Joel Makin; 11–5, 11–4, 11–8	(England) Joshua Masters	(United States) Todd Harrity (England) Richie Fallows	(Austria) Aqeel Rehman (Belgium) Jan Van Den Herrewegen (Denmark) Kristian Frost (England) Adam Murrills
Matamata Open; Matamata, New Zealand; Women : PSA 5; 16 players - $5,000	16–18 June	(New Zealand) Amanda Landers-Murphy; 13–11, 11–5, 11–1	(Scotland) Lisa Aitken	(New Zealand) Megan Craig (New Zealand) Emma Millar	(Philippines) Jemyca Aribado (Australia) Samantha Foyle (Malaysia) Zoe Foo Yuk Han (Malaysia) Aika Azman
SquashXL Open; Auckland, New Zealand; Men : PSA 15; 16 players - $15,000	22–25 June	(New Zealand) Campbell Grayson; 12–10, 15–13, 11–5	(Scotland) Greg Lobban	(Czech Republic) Daniel Mekbib (Australia) Rex Hedrick	(India) Mahesh Mangaonkar (England) Angus Gillams (Australia) Joshua Larkin (New Zealand) Evan Williams
Grand Sport Armenian 2nd Challenger; Yerevan, Armenia; Women : PSA 5; 16 players - $5,000	26–29 June	(French Guiana) Mélissa Alves; 11–4, 11–5, 11–2	(Czech Republic) Anna Serme	(France) Énora Villard (England) Anna Kimberley	(Egypt) Menna Nasser (Switzerland) Cindy Merlo (Egypt) Nadeen Kotb (Iran) A Mousavizadeh
BTMI/TDC Barbados Open; Hastings, Barbados; Men : PSA 5; 25 players - $5,000	27–30 June	(England) Eddie Charlton; 13–11, 11–5, 11–5	(Colombia) Juan Camilo Vargas	(United States) Spencer Lovejoy (Cayman Islands) Cameron Stafford	(United States) Timothy Lasusa (Canada) Thomas King (Colombia) Edgar Ramírez (Trinidad and Tobago) Kale Wilson
Gibraltar Open; Gibraltar; Men : PSA 5; 16 players - $5,000	30 Jun.–1 Jul.	(France) Sébastien Bonmalais; 11–6, 11–8, 11–7	(England) Nick Mulvey	(Republic of Ireland) Arthur Gaskin (England) James Peach	(England) Connor Sheen (Netherlands) Roshan Bharos (England) Miles Jenkins (England) Mark Broekman
City Of Devonport Tasmanian Open; Devonport, Australia; Men : PSA 5; 16 players - $5,000	30 Jun.–2 Jul.	(Australia) Rhys Dowling; 4–11, 11–5, 11–8, 9–11, 11–5	(Australia) Matthew Hopkin	(Hong Kong) Alex Lau (Hong Kong) Chris Lo	(Indonesia) Vivian Rhamanan (Argentina) Ignacio Gutiérrez (England) Robert Dadds (Australia) Darcy Evans

=== July ===
Tournament	Date	Champion	Runner-Up	Semifinalists	Quarterfinalists
South Australian Open; Adelaide, Australia; Men : PSA 5; 16 players - $5,000 −−−−−− Women : PSA 5; 16 players - $5,000	5–8 July	(India) Harinder Pal Sandhu; 11–8, 12–10, 11–4	(Australia) Rhys Dowling	(Netherlands) Piëdro Schweertman (England) Robert Dadds	(South Korea) Park Jong-myoung (Argentina) Leandro Romiglio (South Korea) Ko Young-jo (Australia) Thomas Calvert
South Australian Open; Adelaide, Australia; Men : PSA 5; 16 players - $5,000 −−−−−− Women : PSA 5; 16 players - $5,000	5–8 July	(Australia) Christine Nunn; 11–4, 11–6, 11–2	(Australia) Lisa Camilleri	(Hong Kong) Lee Ka Yi (Australia) Jessica Turnbull	(Egypt) Nadeen Kotb (Australia) Selena Shaikh (Hong Kong) Tong Tsz Wing (Malaysia) Nazihah Hanis
Victorian Open; Wheelers Hill, Australia; Men : PSA 10; 32 players - $10,000 −−−−−− Women : PSA 10; 16 players - $10,000	12–16 July	(India) Harinder Pal Sandhu; 12–14, 11–3, 11–4, 11–7	(Australia) Rex Hedrick	(Australia) Joshua Larkin (Netherlands) Piëdro Schweertman	(France) Victor Crouin (Hong Kong) Tang Ming Hong (Australia) Matthew Hopkin (Australia) Rhys Dowling
Victorian Open; Wheelers Hill, Australia; Men : PSA 10; 32 players - $10,000 −−−−−− Women : PSA 10; 16 players - $10,000	12–16 July	(Hong Kong) Liu Tsz Ling; 17–15, 11–6, 11–5	(New Zealand) Amanda Landers-Murphy	(Australia) Sarah Cardwell (Hong Kong) Ho Tze-Lok	(Australia) Lisa Camilleri (Australia) Tamika Saxby (Hong Kong) Vanessa Chu (Australia) Jessica Turnbull

== Statistical information ==
The players/nations are sorted by:

1. Total number of titles;
2. Cumulated importance of those titles;
3. Alphabetical order (by family names for players).

=== Key ===
World Championship
World Series
PSA 100
PSA 70
PSA 50
PSA 25/35
PSA 5/10/15

=== Titles won by player (men's) ===
Total	Player	World Cham.	World Series	PSA 100	PSA 70	PSA 50	PSA 35	PSA 25	PSA 15	PSA 10	PSA 5
7	Grégory Gaultier (FRA)		●●●	●●●	●						
5	Karim Abdel Gawad (EGY)	●	●●	●	●						
5	Zac Alexander (AUS)										●●●●●
4	Iker Pajares (ESP)									●	●●●
4	Mohammad Al-Saraj (JOR)										●●●●
4	Mohamed ElSherbini (EGY)										●●●●
3	Mohamed El Shorbagy (EGY)		●●	●							
3	Declan James (ENG)								●●●		
3	Greg Lobban (SCO)								●	●●	
3	Nick Sachvie (CAN)									●●	●
3	Adam Murrills (ENG)										●●●
3	Harinder Pal Sandhu (IND)										●●●
2	Nick Matthew (ENG)				●●						
2	Farhan Mehboob (PAK)							●●			
2	Zahed Salem (EGY)							●●			
2	Campbell Grayson (NZL)								●●		
2	Raphael Kandra (GER)									●●	
2	Peter Creed (WAL)									●	●
2	Richie Fallows (ENG)									●	●
2	Vikram Malhotra (IND)									●	●
2	George Parker (ENG)									●	●
2	Robertino Pezzota (ARG)									●	●
2	Leandro Romiglio (ARG)									●	●
2	Jami Äijänen (FIN)										●●
2	Eddie Charlton (ENG)										●●
2	Carlos Cornes (ESP)										●●
2	Wong Chi Him (HKG)										●●
2	Douglas Kempsell (SCO)										●●
2	Martin Knight (NZL)										●●
2	Aqeel Rehman (AUT)										●●
2	Piëdro Schweertman (NED)										●●
1	Ramy Ashour (EGY)		●								
1	Paul Coll (NZL)			●							
1	Ryan Cuskelly (AUS)				●						
1	Mohamed Abouelghar (EGY)					●					
1	Fares Dessouky (EGY)					●					
1	Daryl Selby (ENG)					●					
1	Diego Elías (PER)						●				
1	Alan Clyne (SCO)							●			
1	Stephen Coppinger (RSA)							●			
1	Yip Tsz Fung (HKG)							●			
1	Grégoire Marche (FRA)							●			
1	Omar Abdel Meguid (EGY)							●			
1	César Salazar (MEX)							●			
1	Abdulla Al-Tamimi (QAT)								●		
1	Alfredo Ávila (MEX)								●		
1	Karim Ali Fathy (EGY)								●		
1	Arturo Salazar (MEX)								●		
1	Olli Tuominen (FIN)								●		
1	Jesús Camacho (MEX)									●	
1	Ben Coleman (ENG)									●	
1	Shawn Delierre (CAN)									●	
1	Karim El Hammamy (EGY)									●	
1	Mazen Gamal (EGY)									●	
1	Angus Gillams (ENG)									●	
1	Chris Gordon (EGY)									●	
1	Joe Lee (ENG)									●	
1	Joshua Masters (ENG)									●	
1	Charles Sharpes (ENG)									●	
1	Andrew Schnell (CAN)									●	
1	Youssef Soliman (EGY)									●	
1	Eain Yow (MYS)									●	
1	Ammar Al-Tamimi (KUW)										●
1	Tayyab Aslam (PAK)										●
1	Benjamin Aubert (FRA)										●
1	Ahsan Ayaz (PAK)										●
1	Lance Beddoes (NZL)										●
1	Sébastien Bonmalais (FRA)										●
1	Syed Hamzah Bukhari (PAK)										●
1	Mike Corren (AUS)										●
1	Victor Crouin (FRA)										●
1	Ashley Davies (ENG)										●
1	Rhys Dowling (AUS)										●
1	Auguste Dussourd (FRA)										●
1	Kyle Finch (ENG)										●
1	Stéphane Galifi (ITA)										●
1	Eric Gálvez (MEX)										●
1	Arthur Gaskin (IRE)										●
1	Jaymie Haycocks (ENG)										●
1	Tang Ming Hong (HKG)										●
1	Matthew Hopkin (AUS)										●
1	Youssef Ibrahim (EGY)										●
1	Mohd Syafiq Kamal (MYS)										●
1	Elvinn Keo (MYS)										●
1	Joshua Larkin (AUS)										●
1	Alex Lau (HKG)										●
1	Edmon López (ESP)										●
1	Jens Schoor (GER)										●
1	Ramit Tandon (IND)										●
1	Jan Van Den Herrewegen (BEL)										●
1	Edgar Zayas (MEX)										●

=== Titles won by nation (men's) ===
Total	Nation	World Cham.	World Series	PSA 100	PSA 70	PSA 50	PSA 35	PSA 25	PSA 15	PSA 10	PSA 5
23	Egypt (EGY)	●	●●●●	●●	●	●●		●●●	●	●●●●	●●●●●
23	England (ENG)				●●	●			●●●	●●●●●●●	●●●●●●●●●●
12	France (FRA)		●●●	●●●	●			●			●●●●
10	Australia (AUS)				●						●●●●●●●●●
7	Spain (ESP)									●	●●●●●●
6	New Zealand (NZL)			●					●●		●●●
6	Mexico (MEX)							●	●●	●	●●
6	Scotland (SCO)							●	●	●●	●●
6	India (IND)									●	●●●●●
5	Pakistan (PAK)							●●			●●●
5	Hong Kong (HKG)							●			●●●●
5	Canada (CAN)									●●●●	●
4	Argentina (ARG)									●●	●●
4	Jordan (JOR)										●●●●
3	Finland (FIN)								●		●●
3	Germany (GER)									●●	●
3	Malaysia (MYS)									●	●●
2	Wales (WAL)									●	●
2	Austria (AUT)										●●
2	Netherlands (NED)										●●
1	Peru (PER)						●				
1	South Africa (RSA)							●			
1	Qatar (QAT)								●		
1	Belgium (BEL)										●
1	Ireland (IRE)										●
1	Italy (ITA)										●
1	Kuwait (KUW)										●

=== Titles won by player (women's) ===
Total	Player	World Cham.	World Series	PSA 100	PSA 70	PSA 50	PSA 35	PSA 25	PSA 15	PSA 10	PSA 5
5	Kanzy El Defrawy (EGY)									●●	●●●
4	Laura Massaro (ENG)		●●		●	●					
4	Amanda Landers-Murphy (NZL)										●●●●
3	Camille Serme (FRA)		●●			●					
3	Raneem El Weleily (EGY)		●	●		●					
3	Menna Hamed (EGY)										●●●
3	Sivasangari Subramaniam (MYS)										●●●
2	Nour El Sherbini (EGY)	●				●					
2	Annie Au (HKG)						●●				
2	Nele Gilis (BEL)								●	●	
2	Millie Tomlinson (ENG)								●	●	
2	Samantha Cornett (CAN)									●	●
2	Rowan Elaraby (EGY)									●	●
2	Tong Tsz Wing (HKG)									●	●
2	Julianne Courtice (ENG)										●●
2	Alexandra Fuller (RSA)										●●
2	Tamika Saxby (AUS)										●●
2	Ho Tze-Lok (HKG)										●●
2	Milou van der Heijden (NED)										●●
1	Nouran Gohar (EGY)		●								
1	Nicol David (MYS)				●						
1	Joelle King (NZL)					●					
1	Victoria Lust (ENG)							●			
1	Dipika Pallikal (IND)								●		
1	Teh Min Jie (MYS)									●	
1	Danielle Letourneau (CAN)									●	
1	Liu Tsz Ling (HKG)									●	
1	Hollie Naughton (CAN)									●	
1	Nada Abbas (EGY)										●
1	Mélissa Alves (FRA)										●
1	Lisa Aitken (SCO)										●
1	Rachel Arnold (MYS)										●
1	Jenny Duncalf (ENG)										●
1	Elani Landman (RSA)										●
1	Zeina Mickawy (EGY)										●
1	Christine Nunn (AUS)										●
1	Laura Pomportes (FRA)										●
1	Hana Ramadan (EGY)										●
1	Satomi Watanabe (JPN)										●
1	Amina Yousry (EGY)										●

=== Titles won by nation (women's) ===
Total	Nation	World Cham.	World Series	PSA 100	PSA 70	PSA 50	PSA 35	PSA 25	PSA 15	PSA 10	PSA 5
20	Egypt (EGY)	●	●●	●		●●				●●●	●●●●●●●●●●●
10	England (ENG)		●●		●	●		●	●	●	●●●
7	Hong Kong (HKG)						●●			●●	●●●
6	Malaysia (MYS)				●					●	●●●●
5	France (FRA)		●●			●					●●
5	New Zealand (NZL)					●					●●●●
4	Canada (CAN)									●●●	●
3	Australia (AUS)										●●●
3	South Africa (RSA)										●●●
2	Belgium (BEL)								●	●	
2	Netherlands (NED)										●●
1	India (IND)								●		
1	Japan (JPN)										●
1	Scotland (SCO)										●

== Retirements ==
Following is a list of notable players (winners of a main tour title, and/or part of the PSA Men's World Rankings and Women's World Rankings top 30 for at least one month) who announced their retirement from professional squash, became inactive, or were permanently banned from playing, during the 2016 season:

- Laurens Jan Anjema (born 1 December 1982 in The Hague, Netherlands) joined the pro tour in 1999, reached the singles no. 9 spot in 2010. He won 12 PSA World Tour titles including the Netsuite Open against Omar Mosaad and the Bluenose Classic against Borja Golán. He reached in 2010 the final of the US Open against Wael El Hindi. He retired in July after 15 years on the tour.

== See also ==
- Professional Squash Association (PSA)
- 2015–16 PSA World Series
- 2016–17 PSA World Series
- Men's World Rankings
- Women's World Rankings
- PSA World Series Finals
- PSA World Championship
- 2016 Women's World Team Squash Championships
