= North Shore Open =

Gibson O'Connor North Shore Open

Details
- Event name: North Shore Open
- Location: Auckland, New Zealand

Men's PSA World Tour
- Category: World Tour PSA 5
- Prize money: $5,000
- Most recent champion(s): (Australia) Joshua Larkin, (New Zealand) Amanda Landers-Murphy

The Gibson O'Connor North Shore Open or simply North Shore Open is a yearly professional squash tournament held in Auckland, New Zealand at the North Shore Squash Club, Takapuna. It is part of the PSA World Tour and WSA World Tour.

== Results ==
These are the results from 2017 onwards:

=== 2017 ===
Tournament	Date	Champion	Runner-Up	Semifinalists	Quarterfinalists
2017 Men; PSA 5 $5,000	26–28 May	(Australia) Joshua Larkin; 11–7, 11–5, 11–7	(New Zealand) Evan Williams	(Malaysia) Valentino Bong (New Zealand) Ben Grindrod	(New Zealand) Chris Van Der Salm (New Zealand) Luke Jones (England) Bradley Masters (South Korea) Woo Chang-wook
2017 Women; PSA 5 $5,000	26–28 May	(New Zealand) Amanda Landers-Murphy; 11–8, 12–10, 13–15, 8–11, 11–9	(New Zealand) Megan Craig	(Australia) Jessica Turnbull (Philippines) Jemyca Aribado	(New Zealand) Abbie Palmer (Australia) Samantha Foyle (Australia) Christine Nunn (New Zealand) Emma Millar

== See also ==
- PSA World Tour
- WSA World Tour
