= Äijänen =

Äijänen is a Finnish surname. Notable people with the surname include:

- Jami Äijänen (born 1996), Finnish squash player
- Miko Äijänen (born 1997), Finnish squash player, brother of Jami
