= Nouran El Torky =

Egyptian squash player (born 1992)

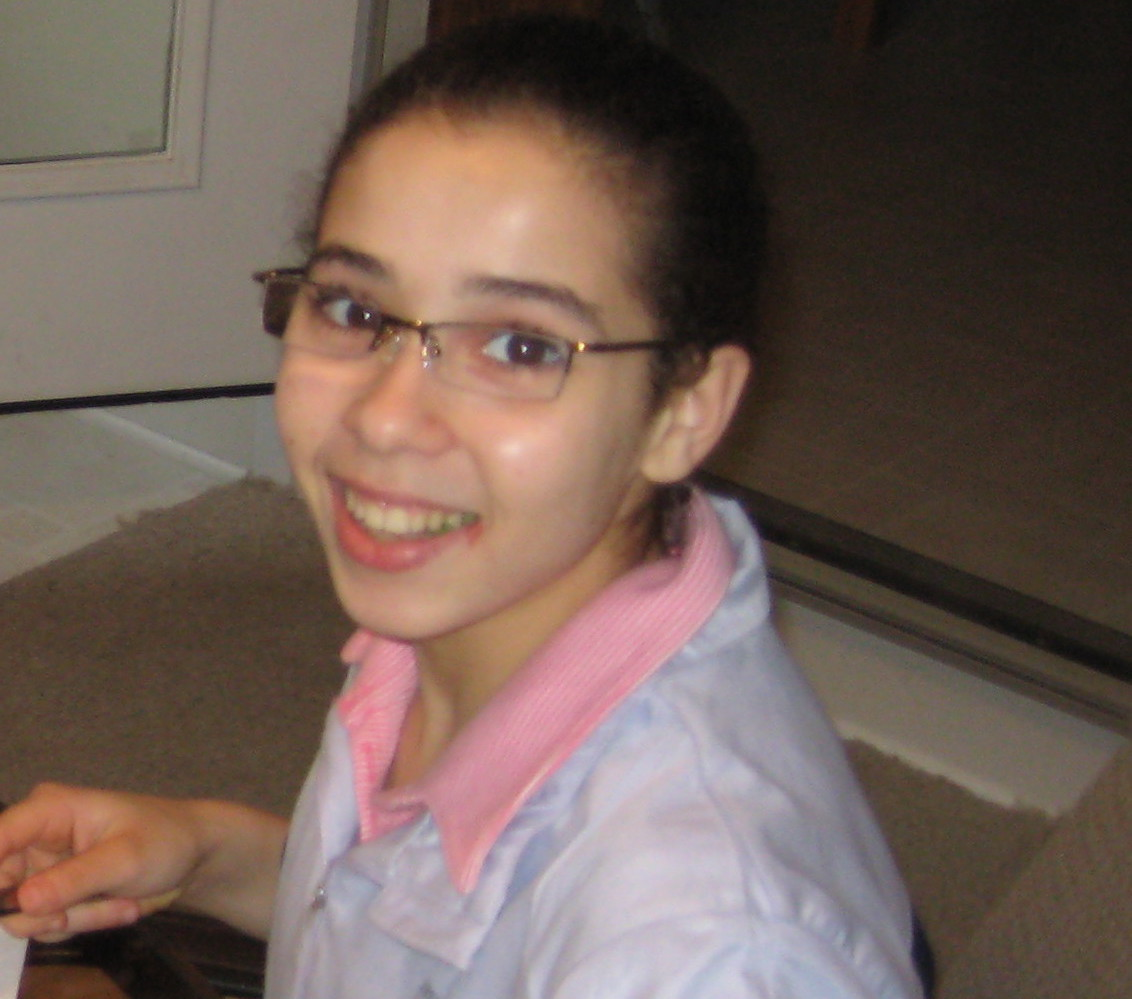

Personal information
- Born: November 7, 1992 (age 33) Alexandria, Egypt

Sport
- Country: Egypt
- Handedness: Right Handed
- Coached by: Ibrahim Assal & Amna El Tarabolsy
- Retired: Active
- Racquet used: Technifibre

Women's singles
- Highest ranking: No. 41 (January, 2015)
- Current ranking: No. 64 (July, 2017)
- Updated on July, 2017

Nouran El Torky (born November 7, 1992) is a professional squash player who represents Egypt. She reached a career-high world ranking of World No. 41 in January 2015. Her older sister Heba is also a professional squash player.
