= Aika Azman =

Malaysian squash player (born 1997)

Personal information
- Born: March 2, 1997 (age 29) Alor Setar, Kedah, Malaysia

Sport
- Country: Malaysia
- Handedness: right handed
- Coached by: Andrew Cross
- Highest ranking: 80 (January 2017)
- Current ranking: 339 (1 September 2024)

Aika Azman (born 2 March 1997) is a Malaysian female squash player. She made her international debut at the 2017 PSA World Tour and achieved her career best-ranking of World No. 80 during the tournament.
