= Tristan Eysele =

South African squash player (born 1989)

Personal information
- Born: 21 November 1989 (age 36) Pietermaritzburg, South Africa

Sport
- Country: South Africa
- Coached by: Jesse Engelbrecht, Robbie Temple
- Racquet used: Karakal

men's singles
- Highest ranking: 126 (March 2018)
- Current ranking: 126 (March 2018)

Tristan Eysele (born 21 November 1989) is a South African male squash player. He achieved his career-high ranking of World No. 126 in March 2018 during the 2018 PSA World Tour.

He is coached both by former South African professional squash player Jesse Engelbrecht and English professional squash player Robbie Temple.
