= Adam Murrills =

English squash player (born 1990)

Personal information
- Born: 23 March 1990 (age 36) Manchester, England

Sport
- Country: England
- Handedness: Right Handed
- Turned pro: 2009
- Retired: Active
- Racquet used: CX Pro Sport
- Highest ranking: No. 76 (December 2017)
- Current ranking: No. 82 (February, 2018)
- Updated on February, 2018

Adam Murrills (born 23 March 1990 in Manchester) is an English professional squash player. As of February 2018, he was ranked number 82 in the world.
