= Riina Koskinen =

Finnish squash player (born 1997)

Personal information
- Born: 17 April 1997 (age 29) Kuopio, Finland
- Height: 164 cm (5 ft 5 in)
- Weight: 63 kg (139 lb)

Sport
- Country: Finland
- Coached by: Olli Tuominen
- Retired: active
- Racquet used: Olivier

women's singles
- Highest ranking: 98 (January 2018)
- Current ranking: 107 (July 2018)

Riina Koskinen (born 17 April 1997) is a Finnish female professional squash player.

During the 2018 PSA World Tour, she was number 98 in the world in January 2018, which was her highest career PSA singles ranking.
