= Rex Hedrick =

Australian squash player (born 1988)

Personal information
- Born: 1 November 1988 (age 37) Melbourne, Australia
- Height: 1.76 m (5 ft 9 in)
- Weight: 65 kg (143 lb)

Sport
- Country: Australia
- Turned pro: 2008
- Coached by: Cameron White
- Retired: Active
- Racquet used: Head

Men's singles
- Highest ranking: No. 48 (September, 2018)
- Title: 10
- Tour final: 20
Medal record
Men's squash
Representing Australia
World Team Championships
Bronze medal – third place	2017 Marseille	Team
World Doubles Championships
Silver medal – second place	2019 Carrara	Doubles
- Updated on 13 April 2022

Rex Hedrick (born 1 November 1988 in Melbourne) is an Australian professional squash player. He reached a career-high world ranking of World No. 48 in September 2018.
