= Nick Mulvey (squash player) =

English squash player (born 1993)

Nick Joseph Mulvey
Personal information
- Born: 24 March 1993 (age 33) Harlow, England

Sport
- Country: England
- Retired: Active
- Racquet used: Head

Men's singles
- Highest ranking: No. 159 (November 2017)
- Current ranking: No. 163 (February 2018)
- Updated on February, 2018

Nick Mulvey (born 24 March 1993 in Harlow) is an English professional squash player. As of February 2018, he was ranked number 163 in the world.
