= Elvinn Keo =

Malaysian squash player (born 1988)

Personal information
- Born: 18 May 1988 (age 38) Penang, Malaysia

Sport
- Country: Malaysia
- Turned pro: 2007
- Retired: Active
- Racquet used: Dunlop
- Highest ranking: No. 91 (September 2013)
- Current ranking: No. 197 (February, 2018)
- Updated on February, 2018

Elvinn Keo (born 18 May 1988 in Penang) is a Malaysian professional squash player. As of February 2018, he was ranked number 197 in the world.
