= Nosherwan Khan =

Pakistani squash player (born 1994)

Personal information
- Born: June 11, 1994 (age 32) Peshawar, Pakistan
- Height: 170 cm (5 ft 7 in)
- Weight: 70 kg (154 lb)

Sport
- Country: Pakistan
- Turned pro: 2008
- Retired: Active
- Racquet used: Harrow

Men's singles
- Highest ranking: No. 145 (October 2013)
- Current ranking: No. 333 (March, 2018)
- Updated on February, 2018

Nosherwan Khan (born 11 June 1994 in Peshawar) is a Pakistani professional squash player. As of March 2018, he was ranked number 333 in the world. He has competed in the main draw of multiple professional PSA tournaments.
