= Teh Min Jie =

Malaysian squash player (born 1996)

Personal information
- Born: May 12, 1996 (age 30) Selangor, Malaysia

Sport
- Country: Malaysia
- Handedness: right-handed
- Coached by: Ong Beng Hee
- Racquet used: Prince
- Highest ranking: 55 (March 2017)
- Current ranking: 195

Teh Min Jie (born 12 May 1996) is a Malaysian female squash player who is a member of the Malaysian squash team. She is currently coached by Ong Beng Hee, a former Malaysian professional squash player.

Teh Min Jie broke into the world's top 100 female squash players list in 2014 and achieved her career best ranking of 55 in March 2017 during the 2017 PSA World Tour. She earned a Wildcard (sports) entry to the Women's China Squash Open 2015 where she lost in three games to England's Emma Beddoes. Teh Min Jie was also a member of the Malaysian squash team which emerged as the champions in the Asian Squash Team Championships in 2016.

In 2017 Teh Min Jie enrolled at Trinity College (Connecticut) and has played in the top three slots on the women's squash team. She was named as one of ten collegiate All-Americans by the College Squash Association.

As of 1 September 2024, she was at number 195 in the PSA world rankings.
