= Edgar Zayas =

Mexican squash player (born 1995)

Personal information
- Born: February 24, 1995 (age 31) Queretaro, Mexico

Sport
- Country: Mexico
- Handedness: Right Handed
- Retired: Active
- Racquet used: Dunlop
- Highest ranking: No. 120 (May 2017)
- Current ranking: No. 212 (February 2018)
- Updated on February, 2018

Edgar Zayas (born 24 February 1995 in Queretaro) is a Mexican professional squash player. As of February 2018, he was ranked number 212 in the world.
