= Chris Lo =

Hong Kong squash player (born 1996)

Personal information
- Born: April 19, 1996 (age 30) Hong Kong

Sport
- Country: Hong Kong
- Handedness: Right Handed
- Retired: Active
- Highest ranking: No. 157 (December 2017)
- Current ranking: No. 168 (February 2018)
- Updated on February, 2018

Chris Lo (born 19 April 1996) is a Hong Kong professional squash player. As of February 2018, he was ranked number 168 in the world.
