= Ruan Olivier =

South African squash player (born 1994)

Personal information
- Born: 5 July 1994 (age 32) Bloemfontein, South Africa

Sport
- Turned pro: 2014
- Racquet used: Dunlop
- Highest ranking: No. 219 (219 September 2023)
- Current ranking: No. 219 (September 2023)
- Updated on September 2023

Ruan André Olivier (born 5 July 1994) is a South African professional squash player. He achieved his highest career PSA singles ranking of 219 in September 2023.
