= Douglas Kempsell =

Scottish squash player (born 1993)

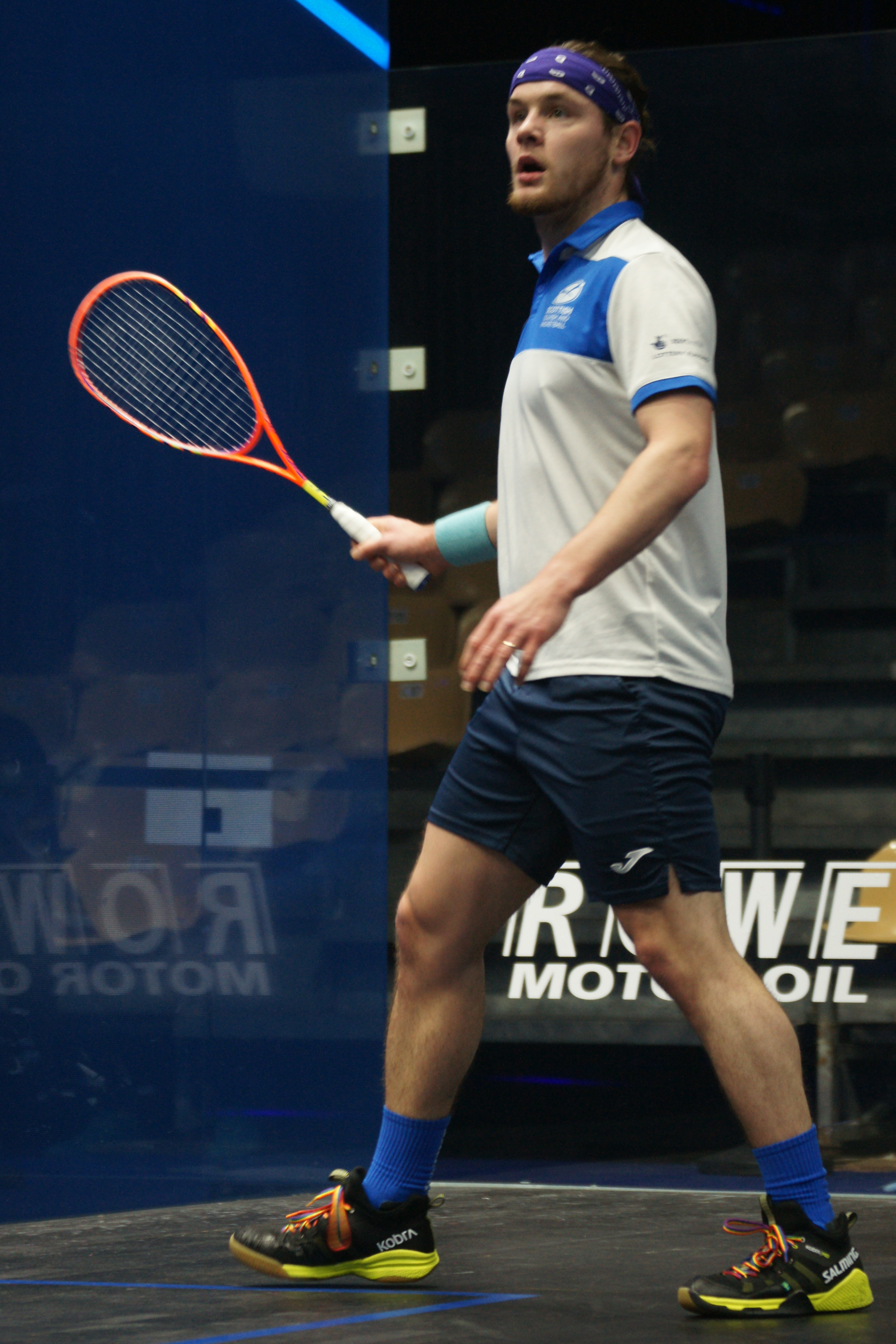
- Kempsell at the 2017 Men's World Team Squash Championships

Personal information
- Nationality: British (Scottish)
- Born: 13 April 1993 (age 33) Edinburgh, Scotland

Sport
- Turned pro: 2013
- Coached by: Roger Flynn
- Racquet used: Salming

Men's singles
- Highest ranking: No. 92 (May 2017)
- Title: 5
- Tour final: 10
Medal record
Men's squash
Representing Scotland
World Doubles Championships
Bronze medal – third place	2022 Glasgow	Doubles

Douglas Leslie Kempsell (born 13 April 1993) is a former professional squash player who represented Scotland at the Commonwealth Games. He reached a career-high world ranking of World No. 92 in May 2017.

== Biography ==
Kempsell represented the Scottish team at the 2022 Commonwealth Games in the Birmingham, England, where he competed in the men's doubles event partnering Alan Clyne.

Kempsell won a bronze medal partnering Alan Clyne at the 2022 World Squash Doubles Championships.

Kempsell retired from international squash and became a head chef at his business Dining by DK. He was professionally trained in Orocco Pier, South Queensferry.
