= Angus Gillams =

English squash player (born 1995)

Personal information
- Born: 3 August 1995 (age 30) Doncaster, England

Sport
- Country: England
- Handedness: Left Handed
- Retired: Active
- Racquet used: Head
- Highest ranking: No. 62 (June 2017)
- Current ranking: No. 71 (February 2018)
- Updated on February, 2018

Angus Gillams (born 3 August 1995) is an English professional squash player. As of February 2018, he was ranked number 71 squash rankings in the world.
