= Joeri Hapers =

Belgian professional squash player (born 1990)

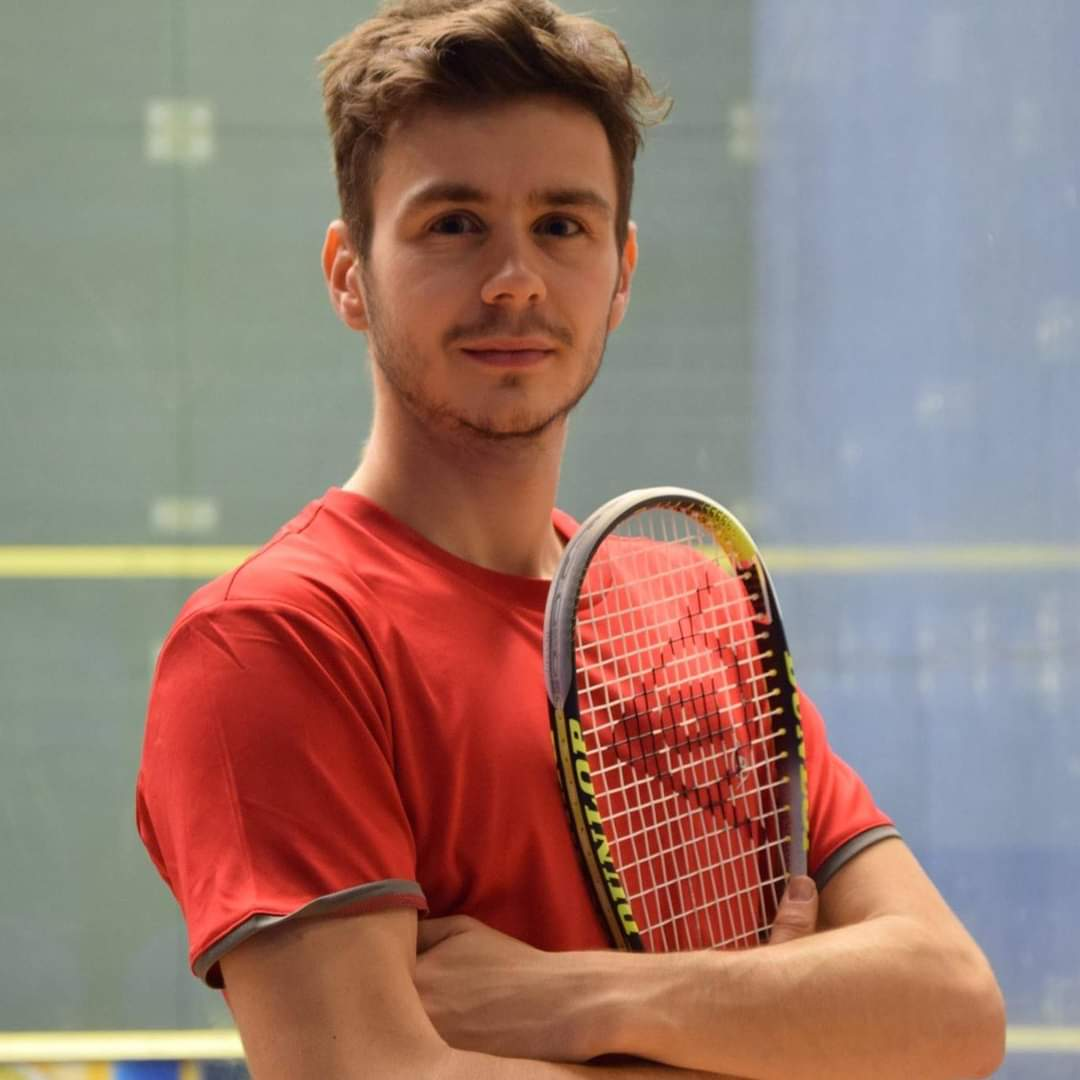

Personal information
- Born: 23 October 1990 (age 35) Geel, Belgium
- Height: 183 cm (6 ft 0 in)
- Website: www.joerihapers.com

Sport
- Country: Belgium
- Handedness: Right-handed

Men's singles
- Highest ranking: No. 116 (10 April 2023)
- Current ranking: No. 158 (7 September 2026)
- Title: 1 PSA Challenger title
- Tour final: 2 PSA Challenger finals
- Updated on 7 September 2026

Joeri Hapers (born 23 October 1990) is a Belgian professional squash player. He reached a career-high world ranking of No. 116 on 10 April 2023. He is a five-time Belgian national champion, winning his fifth title in 2026.

== Career ==
=== Professional tour and rankings ===
Hapers joined the Professional Squash Association in 2014. He won his first PSA Challenger title at the Squash Eredivisie – Speelronde 3 tournament in Amsterdam in March 2021. In December 2024, he finished as runner-up at the II PSA Anyos Park tournament in Andorra. As of September 2026, his PSA record listed one title from two finals.

He achieved his highest world ranking of No. 116 on 10 April 2023. In the PSA rankings published on 7 September 2026, he is ranked No. 158 in the world and is the highest-ranked Belgian male player until date. He also headed the men's SQV-Dunlop domestic ranking for week 32 of 2026, updated on 12 August. He has remained this number 1 position on the SQV-Dunlop domestic rankings consecutively since week 9 of 2018.

=== National championships ===
Hapers won his first Belgian national title in 2017 and his second in 2022. In the 2022 final, he defeated Thimi Christiaens in straight games, completing the tournament without dropping a game.

He retained the title in 2023, becoming Belgian champion for the third time. In 2024, he won his fourth consecutive national title, defeating Lowie Delbeke 11–6, 11–8, 11–7 in the final. He secured his fifth title in 2026.

=== Team competitions and coaching ===
Hapers represented Belgium at the 2023 European Team Championships in Helsinki, where the men's team finished third in Division 2. He defeated Christian Drakenberg in Belgium's 3–1 victory over Sweden in the third-place play-off. This marked the Belgian men's team's third European bronze medal with Hapers in the squad. He was also selected for Belgium's men's squad at the 2026 European Team Championships and has been selected in the Belgium's men's squad since 2017.

At club level, Hapers won the Dutch Eredivisie championship with Victoria Rotterdam in 2019, 2022 and 2023. He also serves as the club's head coach. In Belgium, he has won the team championship with Olympia Hasselt multiple times. In Germany, he has played for Rheydt, Eschweiler and 1. Bremer SC.

== Personal life ==
During the COVID-19 lockdown in 2020, Hapers began drawing and painting while restrictions prevented him from earning income through squash coaching and competition. In a 2021 interview, he described developing his artwork as another means of creative expression.
