= Mark Fuller (squash player) =

English squash player (born 1985)

Personal information
- Born: 24 April 1985 (age 41) Norwich, England

Sport
- Country: England
- Handedness: squash (sport)
- Turned pro: 2008
- Retired: Active

Men's singles
- Highest ranking: No. 118 (September 2016)
- Current ranking: No. 145 (February 2018)
- Updated on February, 2018

Mark Fuller (born 24 April 1985, in Norwich) is an English professional squash player. As of February 2018, he was ranked number 145 in the world.
