= Jan Van Den Herrewegen =

Belgian squash player (born 1993)

Personal information
- Nickname: JeanJean
- Born: 9 September 1993 (age 32) Oudenaarde, Belgium
- Height: 1.87 m (6 ft 2 in)
- Weight: 76 kg (168 lb)

Sport
- Country: Belgium
- Turned pro: 2013
- Coached by: Rob Owen, Mark Burke
- Retired: Active
- Racquet used: Mantis

Men's singles
- Highest ranking: No. 89 (1 February 2017)
- Current ranking: No. 89 (1 February 2017)
- Titles: 2016 Belgium Championship, Sutton Coldfield Open 2015,2016
- Updated on 4 February 2017

Jan Van Den Herrewegen (born 9 September 1993 in Oudenaarde) is a professional squash player who represented Belgium. He has won the 2016 Squash Belgium Championship, Sutton Coldfield Open 2015, 2016 and reached a career-high world ranking of World No. 89 in February 2017.
