= Alex Noakes =

English squash player

Personal information
- Full name: Alexander David Thorpe Noakes
- Born: 11 November 1995 (age 31) Wallingford
- Years active: 2014-present
- Height: 178 cm (5 ft 10 in)
- Weight: 66 kg (146 lb; 10 st 6 lb)

Sport
- Sport: Squash
- Rank: 127 (March 2018)
- Coached by: Victor Montserrat

Alex Noakes (born 11 November 1995) is a professional squash player from Thame, Oxfordshire. Noakes represented England in competition against Ireland, Scotland and Wales in the Home Internationals and achieved a World Junior Ranking of No. 9.

Noakes won the 21st edition of the Italian Open 2013 and reached the Semi-Final of the Portuguese Open that same year.

Noakes has a career-high world rank of No. 127.

== Personal life ==
Noakes, the youngest of Christopher and Nicola Noakes' three children, is a former squash player. At the age of nine, his father took him to their neighbourhood squash club in Thame where he learned the game. In 2009, Noakes won a scholarship to Wellington College (Berkshire) and was subsequently coached from 2009 to 2014 by former world ranked No. 11 Stephen Meads, the schools head coach.

In 2016, Noakes began training with Victor Montserrat of the Barcelona Global Squash Academy and currently resides and trains full-time in central Barcelona.

== Affiliated clubs ==
Noakes signed with the London Coolhurst Club in the English Premier Squash League for 2016–2018. He accepted a deal to play for Challes-Les-Eaux in the French League for the 2017/2018 season. He remains in the squad for Tring Squash Club in the Hertfordshire Squash League and Surrey Sports Park in the Surrey Cup. He has made the occasional appearance for the Old Wellingtonians in the Londondary Cup.
