= Babatunde Ajagbe =

Nigerian squash player (born 1987)

Personal information
- Born: 25 June 1987 (age 39) Abeokuta, Nigeria

Sport
- Country: Nigeria
- Coached by: Friday Odeh, Chris Walker
- Racquet used: Technifibre

men's singles
- Highest ranking: 144 (December 2014)
- Current ranking: 344 (March 2018)

Babatunde Ajagbe (born 25 June 1987) is a Nigerian male squash player. He achieved his highest career ranking of 144 in December 2014, during the 2014 PSA World Tour.
