= Vanessa Chu =

Hong Kong squash player (born 1994)

Personal information
- Born: September 29, 1994 (age 31) Hong Kong

Sport
- Country: Hong Kong
- Handedness: Right Handed
- Turned pro: 2009
- Coached by: Rebecca Chiu
- Retired: Active
- Racquet used: Dunlop

Women's singles
- Highest ranking: No. 49 (July 2019)
- Current ranking: No. 49 (September 2019)
- Updated on September 2019

Vanessa Chu (born September 29, 1994 in Hong Kong) is a professional squash player who represents Hong Kong. She reached a career-high world ranking of World No. 49 in September 2019.
