= Adam Auckland =

English squash player (born 1993)

Personal information
- Born: 23 January 1993 (age 33) Grimsby, England

Sport
- Racquet used: Eye
- Highest ranking: 105 (May 2014)
- Updated on April 2020

Adam Auckland (born 23 January 1993) is an English professional squash player. He achieved his highest career PSA singles ranking of 105 in May 2014.
