= Robert Dadds =

English squash player (born 1992)

Personal information
- Born: 20 January 1992 (age 34) Huntingdon, England

Sport
- Country: England
- Racquet used: Eye

men's singles
- Highest ranking: 186 (November 2017)
- Current ranking: 243 (April 2018)

Robert Dadds (born 20 January 1992) is an English male professional squash player. He achieved his highest career ranking of 186 in November 2017 during the 2017 PSA World Tour.
