= Joshua Larkin =

Australian squash player (born 1989)

Personal information
- Born: 5 December 1989 (age 36) Melbourne, Australia
- Height: 1.83 m (6 ft 0 in)
- Weight: 76 kg (168 lb)

Sport
- Country: Australia
- Turned pro: 2007
- Retired: Active
- Racquet used: Stellar

Men's singles
- Highest ranking: No. 84 (January, 2017)
- Current ranking: No. 87 (May, 2017)
- Title: 3
- Tour final: 9
- Updated on May, 2017

Joshua Larkin (born 5 December 1989 in Melbourne) is a professional squash player who represents Australia. He reached a career-high world ranking of World No. 84 in January 2017. Larkin's breakthrough took place in May 2015 when he won back to back titles in both the 2015 South Australian Open and City of Perth Open respectively. He also won the 2017 North Shore Open. Larkin is currently Australia's second youngest player in the top 100. He won a gold medal in squash in the competitive category at the 2025 World Masters Games in Taiwan.
