= Cheyna Wood =

South African squash player (born 1990)

Personal information
- Born: 2 October 1990 (age 35) Johannesburg, South Africa
- Height: 168 cm (5 ft 6 in)
- Weight: 62 kg (137 lb)

Sport
- Country: South Africa
- Handedness: Right handed
- Turned pro: 2009
- Coached by: Michael Wood
- Retired: Active
- Racquet used: Prince

Women's singles
- Highest ranking: No. 60 (December 2014)
- Current ranking: No. 449 (June 2022)
- Title: 1
- Tour final: 1
- Updated on June 2022

Cheyna Wood, previously known as Cheyna Tucker (born 2 October 1990 in Johannesburg) is a South African professional squash player. As of June 2022, she was ranked number 449 in the world. She reached a career-high world ranking of World No. 60 in December 2014. In June 2022, some 13 years after turning pro, she won her first professional tournament, the Johannesburg Open, for which she had been a wildcard entry.
