= Brian Byrne (squash player) =

Irish squash player (born 1984)

Personal information
- Born: 16 November 1984 (age 41) Kilkenny, Ireland

Sport
- Country: Ireland
- Retired: Active

Men's singles
- Highest ranking: No. 143 (November 2017)
- Current ranking: No. 149 (March 2018)
- Updated on February, 2018

Brian Byrne (born 16 November 1984 in Kilkenny) is an Irish professional squash player. As of March 2018, he was ranked number 149 in the world. He has competed in the main draw of multiple professional PSA tournaments. As of March 2018, he is the highest internationally ranked player in Ireland.
