= Chris Fuller (squash player) =

English squash player (born 1990)

Personal information
- Born: December 7, 1990 (age 35) Kettering, England

Sport
- Country: England
- Turned pro: 2007
- Retired: Active
- Racquet used: Karakal

Men's singles
- Highest ranking: No. 89 (May 2016)
- Current ranking: No. 292 (August 2021)
- Updated on August 2021

Chris Fuller (born 7 December 1990 in Kettering) is an English professional squash player. As of August 2021, he was ranked number 292 in the world.
