= Chloé Mesic =

French squash player (born 1991)

Personal information
- Born: 14 June 1991 (age 35) Boulogne Billancourt, France

Sport
- Country: France
- Handedness: Left Handed
- Turned pro: 2009
- Coached by: Stéphane Ducos
- Retired: Active
- Racquet used: Harrow

Women's singles
- Highest ranking: No. 56 (March 2017)
- Current ranking: No. 56 (March 2017)
Medal record
Women's squash
Representing France
World Team Championships
Bronze medal – third place	2016 Issy-les-Moulineaux	Team
- Updated on March 2017

Chloé Mesic (born 14 June 1991 in Boulogne Billancourt) is a professional squash player who represents France. She reached a career-high world ranking of World No. 56 in March 2017.

== Career ==
In 2016, she was part of the French team that won the bronze medal at the 2016 Women's World Team Squash Championships in her home country.
