= Matthew Hopkin =

Australian squash player (born 1991)

Personal information
- Born: 14 April 1991 (age 35) Brisbane, Australia
- Height: 1.80 m (5 ft 11 in)
- Weight: 74 kg (163 lb)

Sport
- Country: Australia
- Turned pro: 2012
- Retired: Active
- Racquet used: Oliver

Men's singles
- Highest ranking: No. 89 (July, 2014)
- Current ranking: No. 109 (July, 2016)
- Title: 2
- Tour final: 3
- Updated on July, 2016

Matthew Hopkin (born 14 April 1991 in Brisbane) is a professional squash player who represented Australia. He reached a career-high world ranking of World No. 99 in January 2015.
