= Roee Avraham =

Israeli squash player (born 1996)

Roee Avraham רועי אברהם
Personal information
- Born: 17 February 1996 (age 30) Ramat Gan, Israel
- Height: 171 cm (5 ft 7 in)
- Weight: 74 kg (163 lb)

Sport
- Country: Israel
- Turned pro: 2014
- Coached by: Ronny Vlassaks, Nadav Wilensky
- Retired: Active
- Racquet used: Eye
- Highest ranking: No. 152 (November 2017)
- Current ranking: No. 171 (February 2018)
- Updated on February, 2018

Roee Avraham (Hebrew: רועי אברהם; born 17 February 1996 in Ramat Gan) is an Israeli professional squash player. As of February 2018, he was ranked number 171 in the world and number 1 in Israel.
