= Anthony Graham (squash player) =

Zimbabwean-born English squash player (born 1990)

Personal information
- Born: 13 April 1990 (age 36) Mutare, Zimbabwe

Sport
- Country: England
- Racquet used: Prince

men's singles
- Highest ranking: 98 (August 2012)
- Current ranking: 350 (April 2018)

Anthony Graham (born 13 April 1990) is a Zimbabwean born English male professional squash player. He achieved his highest career ranking of 98 in August 2012 during the 2012 PSA World Tour.
