= Guhan Senthilkumar =

Indian squash player (born 1996)

Guhan Senthilkumara
Personal information
- Born: 18 April 1996 (age 30) Salem, India
- Height: 171 cm (5 ft 7 in)
- Weight: 67 kg (148 lb)

Sport
- Country: India
- Coached by: Annette Pilling
- Retired: Active

Men's singles
- Highest ranking: No. 225 (March 2018)
- Current ranking: No. 225 (March 2018)
- Updated on March, 2018

Guhan Senthilkumar (born 18 April 1996 in Salem) is an Indian professional squash player. As of March 2018, he was ranked number 225 in the world, which made him the 7th highest internationally ranked Indian squash player. As a junior, he won the 2017 Penang Open. He has competed in the main draw of multiple professional PSA tournaments.
