= Luke Jones (squash player) =

Squash player

Personal information
- Born: 18 January 1997 (age 29) Middle Swan, Australia
- Height: 180 cm (5 ft 11 in)
- Weight: 76 kg (168 lb)

Sport
- Country: New Zealand
- Coached by: Kashif Shuja
- Retired: Active
- Racquet used: Titan

Men's singles
- Highest ranking: No. 165 (August 2018)
- Current ranking: No. 165 (August 2018)
- Updated on August 2018

Luke Jones (born 18 January 1997 in Middle Swan) is an Australian-born, New Zealand professional squash player. As of August 2018, he was ranked number 165 in the world, and number 4 in New Zealand.
