= Emma Millar =

New Zealand squash player (born 1991)

Personal information
- Born: 9 December 1991 (age 34) Paraparaumu, New Zealand
- Years active: 2007–

Sport
- Country: New Zealand
- Handedness: Right-handed
- Turned pro: 2009
- Retired: Active
- Racquet used: Prince

Women's singles
- Highest ranking: No. 86 (July 2017)
- Current ranking: No. 116 (February 2018)
- Updated on February 2018

Emma Millar (born 9 December 1991 in Paraparaumu) is a New Zealand professional squash player. As of February 2018, she was ranked number 116 in the world.
