= Jessica Turnbull =

Australian squash player (born 1995)

Jessica van der Walt (née Turnbull)
Personal information
- Born: 23 June 1995 (age 31) Wauchope, New South Wales, Australia

Sport
- Coached by: Nathan Turnbull
- Racquet used: Stellar
- Highest ranking: 56 (January 2024)
- Current ranking: 62 (April 2025)
Medal record
Women's squash
Representing Australia
World Doubles Championships
Silver medal – second place	2019 Carrara	Doubles

Jessica van der Walt, (née Turnbull (born 23 June 1995) is an Australian female squash player. She reached a career high ranking of 56 in the world during January 2024. Jessica was also part of the 2017 PSA World Tour.

After marrying she played under her married name of van der Walt.

In April 2025, van der Walt won her 8th PSA title after securing victory in the World Championship Qualifiers during the 2024–25 PSA Squash Tour.
