= Jami Äijänen =

Finnish squash player (born 1996)

Personal information
- Born: 18 April 1996 (age 30) Järvenpää, Finland

Sport
- Country: Finland
- Coached by: Sami Elopuro
- Retired: Active
- Racquet used: Tecnifibre
- Highest ranking: No. 124 (May 2017)
- Current ranking: No. 174 (February 2018)
- Updated on February, 2018

Jami Äijänen (born 18 April 1996, in Järvenpää) is a Finnish professional squash player. As of February 2018, he was ranked number 174 in the world.
