= Megan Craig =

New Zealand squash player (born 1992)

Personal information
- Full name: Megan Amanda Craig
- Born: 11 December 1992 (age 33) Blenheim, New Zealand

Sport
- Country: New Zealand
- Handedness: Right Handed
- Turned pro: 2009
- Coached by: Grant Craig
- Retired: Active
- Racquet used: Harrow

Women's singles
- Highest ranking: No. 39 (July 2015)
- Current ranking: No. 61 (November 2016)
- Title: 4
- Tour final: 3
- Updated on October 2017

Megan Craig (born 11 December 1992) is a New Zealand professional squash player. She reached a career-high world ranking of World No. 39 in July 2015.
