= Valentino Bong =

Malaysian squash player

Personal information
- Full name: Valentino Bon Jovi Bong
- Born: 14 February 1989 (age 37) Kuching, Sarawak, Malaysia
- Height: 177 cm (5 ft 10 in)
- Weight: 75 kg (165 lb)

Sport
- Country: Malaysia
Medal record
Men's squash
Representing Malaysia
Southeast Asian Games
| Gold medal – first place | 2015 Singapore | Team |

Valentino Bon Jovi Bong (born 14 February 1989) is a professional squash player who has represented Malaysia. He is also a coach.

== Early life ==
Bong was born on 14 February 1989 in Kuching, Sarawak in Malaysia. He was born to a Filipino mother, Cavite-native Gloria de Dios, and a Malaysian father who works as an officer at the Malaysian customs. Bong is the eldest child among four siblings.

== Playing career ==
Valentino Bong has represented Malaysia in international tournaments. He has competed at the men's double event at the 2014 Commonwealth Games and at the men's team event of the 2015 Southeast Asian Games where he helped his team win the gold medal.

At the 2016 Southeast Asian Cup, Bong achieved the men's individual squash title.

He plans to play for the Philippines at the 2018 Asian Games and 2019 Southeast Asian Games after he meets the requirements of three years residency in the Philippines and a Philippine passport needed for a sporting nationality transfer.

== Coaching career ==
He joined the national squash team of the Philippines in January 2017 as its coach.
