= 2019–20 PSA World Tour =

Details
- Event name: PSA World Tour 2019–20
- Dates: August 2019 – July 2020
- Categories: World Championship: Men's/Women's; World Tour Finals: Men's/Women's; PSA Challenger Tour; WSF & PSA Satellite Tour
- Website; PSA World Tour

Achievements
- World Number 1: Men : (Egypt) Mohamed El Shorbagy; Women : (Egypt) Nouran Gohar
- World Champion: Men: (Egypt) Tarek Momen; Women: (Egypt) Nour El Sherbini

The 2019–20 PSA World Tour is the international squash tour organised circuit organized by the Professional Squash Association (PSA) for the 2019–20 squash season. It's the 5th PSA season since the merger of PSA and WSA associations in 2015.

The most important tournaments in the series are the Men's and Women's PSA World Championship. The tour also features two circuits of regular events - PSA World Tour (formerly PSA World Series), which feature the highest prize money and the best fields; and PSA Challenger Tour with prize money ranging $5,500–$30,000. In the middle of the year, the PSA World Tour tour is concluded by the Men's and Women's PSA World Tour Finals in Cairo, the season-ending championships for the top 8 rated players from World Tour level tournaments.

== Overview ==
=== PSA World Tour changes ===
Starting in August 2018, PSA revamped its professional tour structure in two individual circuits; PSA World Tour and PSA Challenger Tour.

PSA World Tour (formerly PSA World Series) will comprise most important tournaments in prize money ($50,000–$1,000,000) for more experienced and higher-ranked players, including PSA World Championships and PSA World Tour Finals, labelled as following:

- PSA World Tour Platinum — 48-player draws — $180,500
- PSA World Tour Gold — 24-player draws — $100,000
- PSA World Tour Silver — 24-player draws — $73,500
- PSA World Tour Bronze — 24-player draws — $51,250

PSA Challenger Tour tournaments will offer a $6,000–$30,000 prize-money, ideal circuit for less-experienced and upcoming players, that will include the following tiers:

- PSA Challenger Tour 30 — $30,000
- PSA Challenger Tour 20 — $20,000
- PSA Challenger Tour 10 — $12,000
- PSA Challenger Tour 5 — $6,000

Further, PSA will implement some rule changes like the removing of qualification rounds among others. Also PSA will grant 7 World Championship wildcards for winners of selected PSA Challenger Tour chosen by PSA. Additionally, PSA and WSF will jointly manage PSA Satellite Tour, a circuit for amateur or junior players who aim to become professionals.

=== Prize money/ranking points breakdown ===
PSA World Tour events also have a separate World Tour ranking. Points for this are calculated on a cumulative basis after each World Tour event. The top eight players at the end of the calendar year are then eligible to play in the PSA World Tour Finals.

Ranking points vary according to tournament tier being awarded as follows:

PSA World Tour			Ranking Points						
Rank	Prize money US$	Ranking Points	Winner	Runner up	3/4	5/8	9/16	17/32	33/48
Platinum	$180,500–$250,000	19188 points	2750	1810	1100	675	410	250	152.5
Gold	$100,000–$121,000	10660 points	1750	1150	700	430	260	160	
Silver	$73,500–$79,500	7470 points	1225	805	490	300	182.5	112.5	
Bronze	$51,250–$56,500	5330 points	875	575	350	215	130	80	
PSA World Tour Finals			Ranking Points						
Rank	Prize money US$	Winner	Runner up	3/4	Round-Robin Match Win	Undefeated bonus			
World Tour Finals	$160,000	1000	550	200	150	150			
PSA Challenger Tour			Ranking Points						
Rank	Prize money US$	Ranking Points	Winner	Runner up	3/4	5/8	9/16	17/32	33/48
Challenger Tour 30	$30,000	3194 points	525	345	210	130	78	47.5	
Challenger Tour 20	$20,000	2112 points	350	230	140	85	51	31.5	
Challenger Tour 10	$12,000	1218 points	200	130	80	50	30	18	
Challenger Tour 5	$6,000	609 points	100	65	40	25	15	9	
PSA World Championships			Ranking Points						
Rank	Prize money US$	Ranking Points	Winner	Runner up	3/4	5/8	9/16	17/32	33/64
PSA World Championships	$500,000	25045 points	3175	2090	1270	780	475	290	177.5

== World Tour halts ==
In mid-March 2020, due to COVID-19 pandemic, The Professional Squash Association was forced to suspend the PSA Tour (World Tour, Challenger Tour and WSF & PSA Satellite Tour) until May. Then, the Tour suspension experienced new extensions first until July and later until September.

PSA Tour return is expected to September 2020.

== Calendar ==
=== Key ===
PSA Tiers
World Championship
World Tour Platinum
World Tour Gold
World Tour Silver
World Tour Bronze
Challenger Tour 5/10/20/30

=== August ===
Tournament	Date	Champion	Runner-Up	Semifinalists	Quarterfinalists
Greetings Squash Championship; Isesaki, Japan; Men : Challenger 10; 24 players - $12,000	1–4 August	(France) Sébastien Bonmalais; 11–1, 11–3, 11–8 (3rd PSA title)	(Egypt) Omar Abdel Meguid	(Malaysia) Mohd Syafiq Kamal (Japan) Ryosei Kobayashi	(Hong Kong) Tang Ming Hong (Japan) Ryūnosuke Tsukue (Japan) Tomotaka Endo (Japan) Naoki Hayashi
City of Greater Bendigo International; Bendigo, Australia; Men : Challenger 5; 16 players - $6,000 −−−−−− Women : Challenger 5; 16 players - $6,000	1–4 August	(Malaysia) Darren Chan; 13–11, 11–5, 11–2 (2nd PSA title)	(Malaysia) Bryan Lim Tze Kang	(United States) Atticus Kelly (Malaysia) Ong Sai Hung	(Singapore) Samuel Kang (Australia) Nicholas Calvert (Australia) Sion Wiggin (France) Enzo Corigliano
City of Greater Bendigo International; Bendigo, Australia; Men : Challenger 5; 16 players - $6,000 −−−−−− Women : Challenger 5; 16 players - $6,000	1–4 August	(Hong Kong) Ho Tze-Lok; 14–12, 11–8, 11–2 (4th PSA title)	(Australia) Sarah Cardwell	(Australia) Christine Nunn (Scotland) Katriona Allen	(England) Grace Gear (Japan) Risa Sugimoto (Netherlands) Elena Wagenmans (Australia) Taylor Flavell
Growthpoint S.A. Open (QE); Cape Town, South Africa; Men : Challenger 10; 24 players - $12,000 −−−−−− Women : Challenger 5; 16 players - $6,000	5–10 August	(Egypt) Youssef Ibrahim; 11–6, 11–7, 11–6 (9th PSA title)	(France) Lucas Serme	(Egypt) Ahmed Hosny (South Africa) Tristan Eysele	(Egypt) Khaled Labib (Zimbabwe) Blessing Muhwati (Egypt) Hazem Helmy (Egypt) Abdallah Elmasry
Growthpoint S.A. Open (QE); Cape Town, South Africa; Men : Challenger 10; 24 players - $12,000 −−−−−− Women : Challenger 5; 16 players - $6,000	5–10 August	(Egypt) Menna Hamed; 11–3, 11–5, 11–2 (5th PSA title)	(South Africa) Milnay Louw	(Egypt) Salma Youssef (France) Marie Stephan	(Egypt) Farah Momen (Czech Republic) Anna Serme (Switzerland) Cindy Merlo (South Africa) Alexa Pienaar
MTC Squash Russian Open (QE); Moscow, Russia; Men : Challenger 5; 24 players - $6,000 −−−−−− Women : Challenger 5; 16 players - $6,000	6–10 August	(Austria) Aqeel Rehman; 11–7, 6–11, 11–7, 11–4 (10th PSA title)	(Finland) Henrik Mustonen	(Scotland) Rory Stewart (Belgium) Joeri Hapers	(Hungary) Balázs Farkas (Brazil) Diego Gobbi (Egypt) Ahmed Mallah (Canada) Darosham Khan
MTC Squash Russian Open (QE); Moscow, Russia; Men : Challenger 5; 24 players - $6,000 −−−−−− Women : Challenger 5; 16 players - $6,000	6–10 August	(United States) Reeham Sedky; 11–0, 11–4, 11–6 (4th PSA title)	(Finland) Emilia Soini	(Switzerland) Nadia Pfister (Hungary) Chinyere Chukwu	(United States) Laila Sedky (Russia) Irina Belyaeva (Finland) Riina Koskinen (Russia) Alesya Aleshina
Northwestern Mutual Life Time Houston Open; Houston, United States; Men : Challenger 30; 24 players - $30,000	7–11 August	(New Zealand) Campbell Grayson; 11–5, 11–9, 9–11, 11–7 (14th PSA title)	(Scotland) Alan Clyne	(Australia) Ryan Cuskelly (France) Sébastien Bonmalais	(India) Aditya Jagtap (Mexico) Mario Yáñez (India) Vikram Malhotra (Mexico) Jesús Camacho
Steel City South Australian Open; Whyalla, Australia; Men : Challenger 5; 16 players - $6,000 −−−−−− Women : Challenger 5; 16 players - $6,000	9–11 August	(Scotland) Angus Gillams; 8–11, 11–7, 11–5, 11–8 (9th PSA title)	(Egypt) Moustafa El Sirty	(Singapore) Samuel Kang (Hong Kong) Harley Lam	(Hong Kong) Chung Yat Long (United States) Atticus Kelly (Hong Kong) Matthew Lai (Australia) Rhys Dowling
Steel City South Australian Open; Whyalla, Australia; Men : Challenger 5; 16 players - $6,000 −−−−−− Women : Challenger 5; 16 players - $6,000	9–11 August	(Australia) Jessica Turnbull; 3–11, 4–11, 12–10, 11–7, 11–9 (3rd PSA title)	(Hong Kong) Tong Tsz Wing	(Malaysia) Wen Li Lai (England) Grace Gear	(South Korea) Lee Ji-hyun (South Korea) Eum Hwa-yeong (Scotland) Katriona Allen (Australia) Selena Shaikh
City of Greater Shepparton International; Shepparton, Australia; Men : Challenger 5; 24 players - $6,000 −−−−−− Women : WSF/PSA Satellite; 8 players - $2,000	14–18 August	(Scotland) Angus Gillams; 11–2, 7–11, 11–8, 11–4 (10th PSA title)	(Egypt) Moustafa El Sirty	(New Zealand) Evan Williams (Australia) Joseph White	(Malaysia) Bryan Lim Tze Kang (United States) Atticus Kelly (Malaysia) Darren Chan (New Zealand) Sion Wiggin
City of Greater Shepparton International; Shepparton, Australia; Men : Challenger 5; 24 players - $6,000 −−−−−− Women : WSF/PSA Satellite; 8 players - $2,000	14–18 August	(England) Grace Gear; 13–11, 11–8, 13–11	(Australia) Sarah Cardwell	(Australia) Selena Shaikh (Scotland) Katriona Allen	(Australia) Taylor Flavell (Netherlands) Elena Wagenmans (Thailand) Anantana Prasertratanakul (Australia) Maria Kalafatis
44th Bombay Gymkhana Maharashtra Open; Mumbai, India; Men : WSF/PSA Satellite; 32 players - $4,300 −−−−−− Women : WSF/PSA Satellite; 32 players - $1,450	16–20 August	(India) Mahesh Mangaonkar; 3–1	(India) Abhishek Pradhan	(India) Abhay Singh (India) Abhishek Agarwal	(India) Gaurav Nandrajog (India) Rahul Baitha (India) Naveen Jangra (India) Yash Fadte
44th Bombay Gymkhana Maharashtra Open; Mumbai, India; Men : WSF/PSA Satellite; 32 players - $4,300 −−−−−− Women : WSF/PSA Satellite; 32 players - $1,450	16–20 August	(India) Tanvi Khanna; 3–0	(India) Yoshna Singh	(India) Aakanksha Rao (India) Sachika Balvani	(India) Urwashi Joshi (India) Radhika Rathore (India) Ankita Patil (India) Nikita Agarwal
Roberts & Morrow North Coast Open (QE); Coffs Harbour, Australia; Men : Challenger 5; 24 players - $6,000 −−−−−− Women : Challenger 5; 16 players - $6,000	22–25 August	(Japan) Ryosei Kobayashi; 11–8, 12–10, 4–11, 11–5 (1st PSA title)	(Malaysia) Addeen Idrakie	(Malaysia) Mohd Syafiq Kamal (New Zealand) Evan Williams	(Malaysia) Bryan Lim Tze Kang (Australia) Nicholas Calvert (Australia) Thomas Calvert (Scotland) Angus Gillams
Roberts & Morrow North Coast Open (QE); Coffs Harbour, Australia; Men : Challenger 5; 24 players - $6,000 −−−−−− Women : Challenger 5; 16 players - $6,000	22–25 August	(Malaysia) Aifa Azman; 11–4, 11–7, 11–4 (5th PSA title)	(Hong Kong) Vanessa Chu	(Malaysia) Ooi Kah Yan (Australia) Jessica Turnbull	(Scotland) Georgia Adderley (France) Chloé Mesic (Scotland) Katriona Allen (New Zealand) Abbie Palmer
HCL SRFI Indian Tour – Delhi Leg (QE); Greater Noida, India; Men : Challenger 10; 24 players - $12,000 −−−−−− Women : Challenger 5; 24 players - $6,000	23–27 August	(India) Vikram Malhotra; 11–6, 6–11, 11–6, 11–6 (10th PSA title)	(India) Aditya Jagtap	(India) Velavan Senthilkumar (India) Yash Fadte	(Kuwait) Ammar Al-Tamimi (India) Abhishek Agarwal (India) Rutvik Rau (Philippines) Robert Garcia
HCL SRFI Indian Tour – Delhi Leg (QE); Greater Noida, India; Men : Challenger 10; 24 players - $12,000 −−−−−− Women : Challenger 5; 24 players - $6,000	23–27 August	(Egypt) Menna Hamed; 11–9, 11–4, 11–6 (6th PSA title)	(India) Sunayna Kuruvilla	(Egypt) Salma Youssef (Egypt) Farida Mohamed	(India) Tanvi Khanna (Egypt) Hana Moataz (India) Ananya Dabke (India) Sachika Balvani
Pakistan Squash Circuit I Islamabad, Pakistan; Men : Challenger 10; 24 players - $12,000 −−−−−− Women : Challenger 5; 24 players - $6,000	26–30 August	(Pakistan) Asim Khan; 8–11, 15–13, 4–11, 11–7, 11–1 (4th PSA title)	(Pakistan) Farhan Mehboob	(Pakistan) Tayyab Aslam (Pakistan) Amaad Fareed	(Pakistan) Farhan Zaman (Pakistan) Israr Ahmed (Pakistan) Waqas Mehboob (Pakistan) Haris Qasim
Pakistan Squash Circuit I Islamabad, Pakistan; Men : Challenger 10; 24 players - $12,000 −−−−−− Women : Challenger 5; 24 players - $6,000	26–30 August	(Pakistan) Amna Fayyaz; 12–10, 11–8, 12–10 (1st PSA title)	(Pakistan) Moqaddas Ashraf	(Canada) Maria Toorpakay (Pakistan) Saima Shoukat	(Pakistan) Rushna Mehboob (Pakistan) Noor-ul-Huda (Pakistan) Anam Mustafa Aziz (Pakistan) Riffat Khan
Squash Melbourne Open; Moorabbin, Australia; Men : Challenger 5; 24 players - $6,000 −−−−−− Women : Challenger 5; 24 players - $6,000	30 Aug.–1 Sep.	(Australia) Rex Hedrick; 11–6, 11–2, 11–2 (16th PSA title)	(Japan) Ryosei Kobayashi	(South Korea) Ko Young-jo (New Zealand) Evan Williams	(Malaysia) Bryan Lim Tze Kang (South Korea) Hwang Joong-won (Australia) Joseph White (New Zealand) Zac Millar
Squash Melbourne Open; Moorabbin, Australia; Men : Challenger 5; 24 players - $6,000 −−−−−− Women : Challenger 5; 24 players - $6,000	30 Aug.–1 Sep.	(Malaysia) Aifa Azman; 11–4, 11–6, 11–7 (6th PSA title)	(Australia) Sarah Cardwell	(Australia) Christine Nunn (Malaysia) Ooi Kah Yan	(England) Grace Gear (Malaysia) Aika Azman (New Zealand) Abbie Palmer (France) Chloé Mesic

(QE): 2019–20 PSA World Squash Championships Qualifying Event.

=== September ===
Tournament	Date	Champion	Runner-Up	Semifinalists	Quarterfinalists
CIB El Shams Tour 1 Cairo, Egypt; Men : Challenger 5; 24 players - $6,000 −−−−−− Women : Challenger 5; 24 players - $6,000	2–6 September	(Egypt) Moustafa El Sirty; 11–2, 12–10, 11–7 (1st PSA title)	(Egypt) Khaled Labib	(Egypt) Omar Elkattan (Egypt) Mohamed Nasser	(Egypt) Shady El Sherbiny (Egypt) Ibrahim Mohamed (Egypt) Abdelrahman Abdelkhalek (Egypt) Seif Hasanein
CIB El Shams Tour 1 Cairo, Egypt; Men : Challenger 5; 24 players - $6,000 −−−−−− Women : Challenger 5; 24 players - $6,000	2–6 September	(Egypt) Jana Shiha; 11–8, 11–6, 11–8 (1st PSA title)	(Egypt) Sana Ibrahim	(Egypt) Nour Aboulmakarim (Egypt) Nour Wageeh	(Egypt) Malak Kamal (Egypt) Noureen Khalifa (Egypt) Habiba El Defrawy (Egypt) Lina El Sherif
Arrayanes–Copa Produbanco; Puembo, Ecuador; Women : Challenger 10; 24 players - $12,000	4–7 September	(Mexico) Diana García; 11–8, 7–11, 12–10, 13–15, 11–6 (1st PSA title)	(Canada) Nikki Todd	(England) Alicia Mead (Ecuador) Andrea Soria	(England) Anna Kimberley (Colombia) Laura Tovar (Argentina) Pilar Etchechoury (Spain) Sofía Mateos
J.P. Morgan China Squash Open; Shanghai, China; Men : World Tour Gold; 24 players - $112,000 - Draw −−−−−− Women : World Tour Gold; 24 players - $112,000 - Draw	4–8 September	(Egypt) Mohamed El Shorbagy; 11–3, 11–9, 5–11, 11–8 (38th PSA title)	(Egypt) Ali Farag	(Egypt) Marwan El Shorbagy (India) Saurav Ghosal	(England) Tom Richards (Egypt) Mazen Hesham (Hong Kong) Leo Au (Egypt) Omar Mosaad
J.P. Morgan China Squash Open; Shanghai, China; Men : World Tour Gold; 24 players - $112,000 - Draw −−−−−− Women : World Tour Gold; 24 players - $112,000 - Draw	4–8 September	(Egypt) Nour El Tayeb; 11–9, 9–11, 11–9, 9–11, 12–10 (9th PSA title)	(Egypt) Raneem El Weleily	(Egypt) Hania El Hammamy (Egypt) Nouran Gohar	(Egypt) Yathreb Adel (New Zealand) Joelle King (Egypt) Salma Hany (Egypt) Nadine Shahin
Madeira Island Open; Caniço, Portugal; Men : Challenger 10; 24 players - $12,000	4–8 September	(England) Patrick Rooney; 11–6, 6–11, 12–10, 11–5 (3rd PSA title)	(England) Tom Ford	(Portugal) Rui Soares (India) Aditya Jagtap	(Denmark) Kristian Frost (Spain) Bernat Jaume (Austria) Aqeel Rehman (Canada) David Baillargeon
Open de France - Nantes; Nantes, France; Men : World Tour Silver; 24 players - $73,500 - Draw −−−−−− Women : World Tour Silver; 24 players - $73,500 - Draw	9–14 September	(New Zealand) Paul Coll; 12–10, 11–3, 11–9 (14th PSA title)	(Wales) Joel Makin	(France) Grégoire Marche (Egypt) Zahed Salem	(France) Mathieu Castagnet (Egypt) Fares Dessouky (Germany) Simon Rösner (England) James Willstrop
Open de France - Nantes; Nantes, France; Men : World Tour Silver; 24 players - $73,500 - Draw −−−−−− Women : World Tour Silver; 24 players - $73,500 - Draw	9–14 September	(France) Camille Serme; 9–11, 11–6, 11–8, 11–9 (14th PSA title)	(United States) Amanda Sobhy	(England) Sarah-Jane Perry (Egypt) Hania El Hammamy	(England) Emily Whitlock (United States) Olivia Blatchford Clyne (England) Millie Tomlinson (England) Alison Waters
HKFC International Squash Open; Hong Kong, China; Men : Challenger 30; 24 players - $30,000 - Draw −−−−−− Women : Challenger 30; 24 players - $30,000 - Draw	10–14 September	(Scotland) Greg Lobban; 11–8, 11–6, 11–5 (10th PSA title)	(Hong Kong) Yip Tsz Fung	(Qatar) Abdulla Al-Tamimi (Egypt) Mohamed ElSherbini	(France) Lucas Serme (Hong Kong) Alex Lau (Switzerland) Dimitri Steinmann (Hong Kong) Henry Leung
HKFC International Squash Open; Hong Kong, China; Men : Challenger 30; 24 players - $30,000 - Draw −−−−−− Women : Challenger 30; 24 players - $30,000 - Draw	10–14 September	(Hong Kong) Annie Au; 11–8, 12–10, 11–4 (17th PSA title)	(Egypt) Nada Abbas	(Canada) Danielle Letourneau (Malaysia) Low Wee Wern	(Hong Kong) Vanessa Chu (Malaysia) Rachel Arnold (Australia) Donna Lobban (Hong Kong) Liu Tsz Ling
The CenterState Bank Marietta Open; Marietta, United States; Men : Challenger 10; 16 players - $12,000	12–15 September	(France) Victor Crouin; 11–7, 11–7, 11–3 (8th PSA title)	(Jamaica) Christopher Binnie	(Mexico) Leonel Cárdenas (Mexico) Jesús Camacho	(India) Vikram Malhotra (United States) Andrew Douglas (Egypt) Shehab Essam (Canada) Nick Sachvie
NASH Cup; London, Canada; Men : Challenger 10; 24 players - $12,000 −−−−−− Women : Challenger 20; 24 players - $20,000	17–21 September	(France) Auguste Dussourd; 6–11, 11–5, 11–4, 5–11, 11–5 (7th PSA title)	(India) Vikram Malhotra	(Mexico) Alfredo Ávila (Mexico) Leonel Cárdenas	(Switzerland) Reiko Peter (England) Lyell Fuller (Jamaica) Christopher Binnie (Canada) Cameron Seth
NASH Cup; London, Canada; Men : Challenger 10; 24 players - $12,000 −−−−−− Women : Challenger 20; 24 players - $20,000	17–21 September	(France) Mélissa Alves; 11–9, 11–2, 11–6 (5th PSA title)	(England) Jasmine Hutton	(Finland) Emilia Soini (Australia) Donna Lobban	(Switzerland) Cindy Merlo (Canada) Nikki Todd (Scotland) Alison Thomson (France) Énora Villard
Suqian International Squash Classic; Suqian, China; Men : Challenger 5; 16 players - $6,000 −−−−−− Women : Challenger 5; 16 players - $6,000	19–22 September	(Spain) Carlos Cornes; 11–5, 11–9, 11–7 (6th PSA title)	(Hong Kong) Wong Chi Him	(Germany) Valentin Rapp (England) Tom Walsh	(Japan) Ryosei Kobayashi (Malaysia) Darren Rahul Pragasam (Malaysia) Ryan Pasqual (Malaysia) Elvinn Keo
Suqian International Squash Classic; Suqian, China; Men : Challenger 5; 16 players - $6,000 −−−−−− Women : Challenger 5; 16 players - $6,000	19–22 September	(Hong Kong) Lee Ka Yi; 12–10, 11–6, 11–13, 9–11, 11–7 (2nd PSA title)	(Malaysia) Yee Xin Ying	(Malaysia) Chan Yiwen (England) Alice Green	(South Korea) Oh Sung-hee (Thailand) Anantana Prasertratanakul (France) Fanny Segers (England) Katie Wells
Kiva Club Open; Santa Fe, United States; Men : Challenger 5; 16 players - $6,000	19–22 September	(Canada) Michael McCue; 11–5, 11–9, 11–5 (2nd PSA title)	(Nigeria) Babatunde Ajagbe	(Mexico) Allan Núñez (Guatemala) Josué Enríquez	(Mexico) Alejandro Reyes (England) Chris Fuller (Colombia) Ronald Palomino (Mexico) Miled Zarazúa
QSF No.3; Doha, Qatar; Men : Challenger 5; 16 players - $6,000	22–25 September	(France) Benjamin Aubert; 11–4, 11–3, 11–3 (4th PSA title)	(Egypt) Moustafa El Sirty	(Jordan) Mohammad Al-Saraj (Egypt) Khaled Labib	(Kuwait) Abdullah Al-Muzayen (Egypt) Omar Elkattan (Egypt) Yehia El Nawsany (Spain) Bernat Jaume
Oracle Netsuite Open; San Francisco, United States; Men : World Tour Gold; 24 players - $121,000 - Draw −−−−−− Women : World Tour Gold; 24 players - $121,000 - Draw	24–30 September	(Egypt) Mohamed El Shorbagy; 11–5, 11–13, 11–9, 7–11, 11–4 (39th PSA title)	(Egypt) Tarek Momen	(Egypt) Marwan El Shorbagy (Colombia) Miguel Ángel Rodríguez	(Germany) Raphael Kandra (Wales) Joel Makin (Australia) Ryan Cuskelly (Scotland) Alan Clyne
Oracle Netsuite Open; San Francisco, United States; Men : World Tour Gold; 24 players - $121,000 - Draw −−−−−− Women : World Tour Gold; 24 players - $121,000 - Draw	24–30 September	(Egypt) Raneem El Weleily; 11–5, 11–5, 11–5 (24th PSA title)	(Egypt) Nour El Tayeb	(France) Camille Serme (India) Joshna Chinappa	(New Zealand) Joelle King (Wales) Tesni Evans (England) Sarah-Jane Perry (United States) Amanda Sobhy
Aspin Cup; Charlottetown, Canada; Men : Challenger 5; 16 players - $6,000 −−−−−− Women : Challenger 5; 16 players - $6,000	25–28 September	(France) Auguste Dussourd; 11–3, 11–5, 11–7 (8th PSA title)	(Canada) Shawn Delierre	(Jamaica) Christopher Binnie (England) Jaymie Haycocks	(Mexico) Jesús Camacho (United States) Shahjahan Khan (Canada) Thomas King (United States) Guy Davidson
Aspin Cup; Charlottetown, Canada; Men : Challenger 5; 16 players - $6,000 −−−−−− Women : Challenger 5; 16 players - $6,000	25–28 September	(United States) Marina Stefanoni; 5–11, 11–8, 11–6, 15–17, 11–9 (4th PSA title)	(Egypt) Hana Moataz	(Scotland) Alison Thomson (Canada) Nicole Bunyan	(Australia) Sarah Cardwell (Mexico) Diana García (France) Marie Stephan (England) Anna Kimberley
Malaysian Open; Kuala Lumpur, Malaysia; Men : Challenger 30; 24 players - $30,000 −−−−−− Women : Challenger 20; 24 players - $20,000	25–29 September	(Malaysia) Eain Yow; 11–7, 12–14, 11–9, 11–5 (4th PSA title)	(Switzerland) Nicolas Müller	(Egypt) Youssef Soliman (Portugal) Rui Soares	(Spain) Edmon López (Malaysia) Ivan Yuen (Spain) Carlos Cornes (Pakistan) Tayyab Aslam
Malaysian Open; Kuala Lumpur, Malaysia; Men : Challenger 30; 24 players - $30,000 −−−−−− Women : Challenger 20; 24 players - $20,000	25–29 September	(Malaysia) Rachel Arnold; 11–7, 11–13, 10–12, 11–8, 11–5 (3rd PSA title)	(Malaysia) Low Wee Wern	(Egypt) Rowan Elaraby (Hong Kong) Vanessa Chu	(United States) Sabrina Sobhy (Malaysia) Aira Azman (Malaysia) Ooi Kah Yan (Egypt) Menna Hamed
Haining Squash Open; Haining, China; Men : Challenger 5; 16 players - $6,000 −−−−−− Women : Challenger 5; 16 players - $6,000	26–29 September	(Japan) Ryosei Kobayashi; 11–9, 11–3, 11–8 (2nd PSA title)	(Hong Kong) Tang Ming Hong	(England) Tom Walsh (Hungary) Balázs Farkas	(Malaysia) Elvinn Keo (Malaysia) Wee Ming Hock (Malaysia) Ryan Pasqual (Zimbabwe) Faisal Hassan
Haining Squash Open; Haining, China; Men : Challenger 5; 16 players - $6,000 −−−−−− Women : Challenger 5; 16 players - $6,000	26–29 September	(Hong Kong) Tong Tsz Wing; 11–3, 11–5, 11–6 (8th PSA title)	(Philippines) Jemyca Aribado	(Malaysia) Yee Xin Ying (Thailand) Anantana Prasertratanakul	(France) Fanny Segers (Singapore) Wai Yhann Au Yeong (England) Alice Green (South Korea) Oh Sung-hee
Wakefield PSA Open; The Plains, United States; Men : Challenger 5; 16 players - $6,000	26–29 September	(United States) Christopher Gordon; 11–7, 5–11, 11–6, 11–9 (6th PSA title)	(Canada) Michael McCue	(United States) Timothy Brownell (Egypt) Mohamed Nabil	(Bermuda) Noah Browne (Egypt) Mustafa Nawar (England) Anthony Graham (United States) Spencer Lovejoy
Lorient Open; Larmor-Plage, France; Men : WSF/PSA Satellite; 64 players - $2,500	27–29 September	(France) Fabien Verseille; 3–2	(France) Sébastien Bonmalais	(France) Baptiste Bouin (France) Manuel Paquemar	(France) Vincent Bouron (France) Florian Rondinaud (France) Stéphane Brevard (France) Léo Blin

=== October ===
Tournament	Date	Champion	Runner-Up	Semifinalists	Quarterfinalists
CIB Port Said Tour 2 Port Said, Egypt; Men : Challenger 5; 24 players - $6,000 −−−−−− Women : Challenger 5; 24 players - $6,000	2–6 October	(Egypt) Moustafa El Sirty; 11–5, 7–11, 11–9, 11–9 (2nd PSA title)	(Egypt) Yehia El Nawsany	(Egypt) Omar Elkattan (Egypt) Karim Elbarbary	(Mexico) Leonardo Vargas (Egypt) Mohamed Mostafa (Egypt) Hazem Helmy (Egypt) Khaled Labib
CIB Port Said Tour 2 Port Said, Egypt; Men : Challenger 5; 24 players - $6,000 −−−−−− Women : Challenger 5; 24 players - $6,000	2–6 October	(Egypt) Jana Shiha; 11–8, 11–8, 11–8 (2nd PSA title)	(Egypt) Salma El Tayeb	(Egypt) Sana Ibrahim (Egypt) Fairouz Ehab	(Egypt) Haya Ali (Egypt) Lina Tammam (Egypt) Amina El Rihany (Egypt) Habiba El Defrawy
Czech Open; Prague, Czech Republic; Men : Challenger 5; 24 players - $6,000	2–6 October	(Belgium) Jan Van Den Herrewegen; 12–10, 11–0, 11–3 (6th PSA title)	(Denmark) Kristian Frost	(Jordan) Mohammad Al-Saraj (Czech Republic) Martin Švec	(Hungary) Balázs Farkas (Czech Republic) Jakub Solnický (Italy) Yuri Farneti (Brazil) Guilherme Melo
Vitesse Stortford Classic; Bishop's Stortford, England; Men : WSF/PSA Satellite; 16 players - $2,300	4–6 October	(England) Harry Falconer; 6–11, 13–11, 7–11, 11–9, 11–6	(England) Robert Downer	(England) Connor Sheen (Wales) Owain Taylor	(England) Ben Ford (England) Sam Todd (Scotland) Martin Ross (England) Nick Mulvey
FS Investments U.S. Open; Philadelphia, United States; Men : World Tour Platinum; 48 players - $185,500 - Draw −−−−−− Women : World Tour Platinum; 48 players - $185,500 - Draw	5–12 October	(Egypt) Ali Farag; 11–4, 11–7, 11–2 (18th PSA title)	(Egypt) Mohamed El Shorbagy	(Peru) Diego Elías (Egypt) Tarek Momen	(Egypt) Karim Abdel Gawad (Germany) Simon Rösner (New Zealand) Paul Coll (Colombia) Miguel Ángel Rodríguez
FS Investments U.S. Open; Philadelphia, United States; Men : World Tour Platinum; 48 players - $185,500 - Draw −−−−−− Women : World Tour Platinum; 48 players - $185,500 - Draw	5–12 October	(Egypt) Nouran Gohar; 3–11, 8–11, 14–12, 11–8, 11–7 (8th PSA title)	(Egypt) Nour El Tayeb	(Egypt) Raneem El Weleily (France) Camille Serme	(England) Sarah-Jane Perry (Wales) Tesni Evans (Egypt) Rowan Elaraby (United States) Amanda Sobhy
Coverstaff Recruitment SquashXL Open; Auckland, New Zealand; Men : Challenger 5; 24 players - $6,000	9–13 October	(Hong Kong) Tang Ming Hong; 12–10, 11–7, 9–11, 11–8 (3rd PSA title)	(Malaysia) Darren Rahul Pragasam	(New Zealand) Evan Williams (New Zealand) Lwamba Chileshe	(New Zealand) Chris Van der Salm (Malaysia) Ong Sai Hung (Hong Kong) Harley Lam (Australia) Joel Arscott
HCL SRFI Indian Tour – Chennai Leg; Chennai, India; Men : Challenger 20; 24 players - $20,000 −−−−−− Women : Challenger 10; 24 players - $12,000	13–17 October	(Malaysia) Ivan Yuen; 7–11, 12–10, 11–6, 5–11, 11–8 (10th PSA title)	(India) Mahesh Mangaonkar	(India) Harinder Pal Sandhu (India) Aditya Jagtap	(Malaysia) Addeen Idrakie (Scotland) Angus Gillams (Hong Kong) Henry Leung (Switzerland) Dimitri Steinmann
HCL SRFI Indian Tour – Chennai Leg; Chennai, India; Men : Challenger 20; 24 players - $20,000 −−−−−− Women : Challenger 10; 24 players - $12,000	13–17 October	(Malaysia) Rachel Arnold; 11–1, 11–4, 6–11, 11–5 (4th PSA title)	(Malaysia) Wen Li Lai	(Egypt) Menna Nasser (Egypt) Menna Hamed	(India) Sunayna Kuruvilla (Malaysia) Aifa Azman (Philippines) Jemyca Aribado (Malaysia) Chan Yiwen
Arnold Homes Tring Open; Tring, England; Men : Challenger 20; 24 players - $20,000	15–19 October	(England) Patrick Rooney; 11–8, 11–4, 11–9 (4th PSA title)	(England) Ben Coleman	(Spain) Bernat Jaume (England) Daryl Selby	(England) Chris Simpson (Spain) Carlos Cornes (Egypt) Mohamed ElSherbini (France) Sébastien Bonmalais
Life Time Chicago Open; Vernon Hills, United States; Men : Challenger 30; 24 players - $30,000	16–20 October	(England) Adrian Waller; 11–7, 11–4, 11–3 (8th PSA title)	(New Zealand) Campbell Grayson	(United States) Shahjahan Khan (India) Vikram Malhotra	(Mexico) Arturo Salazar (Australia) Ryan Cuskelly (Portugal) Rui Soares (United States) Chris Hanson
Cleveland Skating Club Open; Shaker Heights, United States; Men : Challenger 20; 24 players - $24,000	16–20 October	(Scotland) Greg Lobban; 11–8, 10–12, 11–5, 11–9 (11th PSA title)	(France) Victor Crouin	(Jamaica) Christopher Binnie (England) Lyell Fuller	(Mexico) Alfredo Ávila (France) Auguste Dussourd (Canada) Nick Sachvie (Canada) Shawn Delierre
2nd Novum Energy Texas Open; Houston, United States; Men : Challenger 10; 24 players - $12,000	16–20 October	(England) Nathan Lake; 11–7, 11–9, 11–9 (3rd PSA title)	(United States) Christopher Gordon	(Egypt) Mazen Gamal (Mexico) Leonel Cárdenas	(Mexico) Jorge Gómez (Republic of Ireland) Sean Conroy (England) Miles Jenkins (England) Tom Walsh
Swiss Open; Uster, Switzerland; Men : Challenger 10; 24 players - $12,000 −−−−−− Women : WSF/PSA Satellite; 16 players - $1,000	23–27 October	(Switzerland) Dimitri Steinmann; 3–11, 11–3, 6–11, 3–3 rtd. (6th PSA title)	(Mexico) Jesús Camacho	(Canada) Shawn Delierre (Denmark) Kristian Frost	(Scotland) Rory Stewart (France) Fabien Verseille (Egypt) Omar Elkattan (Spain) Carlos Cornes
Swiss Open; Uster, Switzerland; Men : Challenger 10; 24 players - $12,000 −−−−−− Women : WSF/PSA Satellite; 16 players - $1,000	23–27 October	(Switzerland) Ambre Allinckx; 9–11, 5–11, 11–5, 11–9, 11–8	(Germany) Astrid Reimer-Kern	(Switzerland) Jasmin Ballmann (Germany) Aylin Günsav	(Switzerland) Cassandra Fitze (Switzerland) Sarah Lüdin (Iran) Taba Taghavi (England) Katie Cox
CIB PSA Women's World Championship; Cairo, Egypt; Women : World Championship; 64 players - $430,000 - Draw	24 Oct.–1 Nov.	(Egypt) Nour El Sherbini; 11–4, 9–11, 11–5, 11–6 (4th World Championship title) (20th PSA title)	(Egypt) Raneem El Weleily	(Egypt) Nouran Gohar (Egypt) Hania El Hammamy	(France) Camille Serme (England) Sarah-Jane Perry (New Zealand) Joelle King (Egypt) Nour El Tayeb
CIB Egyptian Squash Open; Cairo, Egypt; Men : World Tour Platinum; 48 players - $185,500 - Draw	25 Oct.–1 Nov.	(Egypt) Karim Abdel Gawad; 11–6, 11–8, 11–8 (22nd PSA title)	(Egypt) Ali Farag	(Wales) Joel Makin (New Zealand) Paul Coll	(Egypt) Fares Dessouky (Egypt) Marwan El Shorbagy (England) Daryl Selby (France) Baptiste Masotti
4th BTMI Barbados Open; Hastings, Barbados; Men : Challenger 5; 24 players - $6,000 −−−−−− Women : WSF/PSA Satellite; 8 players - $500	30 Oct.–2 Nov.	(Canada) Shawn Delierre; 11–9, 6–11, 11–5, 14–12 (17th PSA title)	(United States) Christopher Gordon	(Portugal) Rui Soares (England) Lyell Fuller	(England) Alex Noakes (Colombia) Ronald Palomino (Colombia) Felipe Tovar (India) Karan Malik
4th BTMI Barbados Open; Hastings, Barbados; Men : Challenger 5; 24 players - $6,000 −−−−−− Women : WSF/PSA Satellite; 8 players - $500	30 Oct.–2 Nov.	(Barbados) Jada Smith-Padmore; 11–4, 11–5, 11–3	(Barbados) Lilianna White	(Barbados) Jodi Smith-Padmore (Barbados) Lynn de Cambra	(Barbados) Joanna Atkins (Barbados) Eboni Atherley (Barbados) Jahcinta Adams (Barbados) Gabriella Greene
Celestino Martinez Memorial; Stanford, United States; Men : Challenger 5; 16 players - $6,000	30 Oct.–2 Nov.	(United States) Shahjahan Khan; 8–11, 11–9, 11–5, 11–6 (3rd PSA title)	(Mexico) Mario Yáñez	(Republic of Ireland) Sean Conroy (Egypt) Mustafa Nawar	(England) Mark Broekman (Guatemala) Josué Enríquez (United States) Atticus Kelly (England) Charlie Johnson
JC Women's Open; Ottawa, Canada; Women : Challenger 10; 16 players - $12,000	31 Oct.–3 Nov.	(Canada) Samantha Cornett; 11–5, 11–6, 12–10 (13th PSA title)	(Egypt) Farida Mohamed	(Canada) Nikki Todd (Scotland) Alison Thomson	(Egypt) Salma Youssef (England) Lily Taylor (Latvia) Ineta Mackeviča (Egypt) Hana Ramadan

=== November ===
Tournament	Date	Champion	Runner-Up	Semifinalists	Quarterfinalists
Queensland Open; Kippa-Ring, Australia; Men : Challenger 5; 24 players - $6,000 −−−−−− Women : Challenger 5; 16 players - $6,000	1–3 November	(Australia) Rex Hedrick; 11–7, 4–11, 12–10, 11–4 (17th PSA title)	(Hong Kong) Wong Chi Him	(New Zealand) Evan Williams (Malaysia) Ong Sai Hung	(Australia) Joseph White (Australia) Rhys Dowling (Malaysia) Bryan Lim Tze Kang (Malaysia) Darren Rahul Pragasam
Queensland Open; Kippa-Ring, Australia; Men : Challenger 5; 24 players - $6,000 −−−−−− Women : Challenger 5; 16 players - $6,000	1–3 November	(Australia) Jessica Turnbull; 8–11, 11–8, 11–8, 11–7 (4th PSA title)	(Hong Kong) Vanessa Chu	(South Korea) Choe Yu-ra (Malaysia) Ooi Kah Yan	(South Korea) Lee Ji-hyun (Malaysia) Yee Xin Ying (Australia) Selena Shaikh (India) Sachika Balvani
Detroit Pro Classic; Detroit, United States; Women : Challenger 30; 24 players - $30,000	5–9 November	(United States) Olivia Blatchford Clyne; 12–10, 11–4, 11–6 (7th PSA title)	(Belgium) Nele Gilis	(Egypt) Nadine Shahin (Australia) Donna Lobban	(Egypt) Rowan Elaraby (United States) Sabrina Sobhy (France) Mélissa Alves (Czech Republic) Anna Serme
APM Kelowna Open; Kelowna, Canada; Men : Challenger 10; 24 players - $12,000	6–10 November	(Mexico) Leonel Cárdenas; 15–13, 11–9, 11–7 (7th PSA title)	(Wales) Emyr Evans	(Scotland) Angus Gillams (Canada) Nick Sachvie	(Mexico) Alfredo Ávila (Colombia) Juan Camilo Vargas (Canada) Michael McCue (Czech Republic) Martin Švec
Pacific Toyota Cairns International; Cairns, Australia; Men : Challenger 5; 32 players - $6,000 −−−−−− Women : Challenger 5; 16 players - $6,000	7–10 November	(Hong Kong) Wong Chi Him; 11–7, 11–1, 11–2 (6th PSA title)	(New Zealand) Evan Williams	(Malaysia) Addeen Idrakie (Japan) Naoki Hayashi	(Malaysia) Ryan Pasqual (Malaysia) Bryan Lim Tze Kang (Malaysia) Darren Rahul Pragasam (Malaysia) Ong Sai Hung
Pacific Toyota Cairns International; Cairns, Australia; Men : Challenger 5; 32 players - $6,000 −−−−−− Women : Challenger 5; 16 players - $6,000	7–10 November	(Malaysia) Ooi Kah Yan; 7–11, 11–13, 11–6, 12–10, 11–7 (1st PSA title)	(South Korea) Choe Yu-ra	(Malaysia) Yee Xin Ying (India) Sachika Balvani	(Hong Kong) Vanessa Chu (Malta) Colette Sultana (South Korea) Lee Ji-hyun (South Korea) Heo Min-gyeong
PSA Men's World Championship; Doha, Qatar; Men : World Championship; 64 players - $335,000 - Draw	8–15 November	(Egypt) Tarek Momen; 11–8, 11–3, 11–4 (1st World Championship title) (7th PSA title)	(New Zealand) Paul Coll	(Egypt) Marwan El Shorbagy (Germany) Simon Rösner	(Egypt) Mohamed El Shorbagy (Peru) Diego Elías (Egypt) Zahed Salem (England) James Willstrop
Singapore Open; Kallang, Singapore; Men : WSF/PSA Satellite; 32 players - $6,000 −−−−−− Women : WSF/PSA Satellite; 32 players - $3,000	12–16 November	(Malaysia) Elvinn Keo; 11–4, 11–7, 11–2	(South Korea) Lee Seung-taek	(Malaysia) Nafiizwan Adnan (Philippines) Reymark Begornia	(Singapore) Aaron Liang (Philippines) Robert Garcia (Malaysia) Wee Ming Hock (Malaysia) Mohd Mukhtar
Singapore Open; Kallang, Singapore; Men : WSF/PSA Satellite; 32 players - $6,000 −−−−−− Women : WSF/PSA Satellite; 32 players - $3,000	12–16 November	(Malaysia) Wen Li Lai; 6–11, 11–4, 13–11, 11–8	(Philippines) Jemyca Aribado	(Singapore) Wai Yhann Au Yeong (Malaysia) Aika Azman	(Malaysia) Amirah Rosli (Malaysia) Angie Ooi (Singapore) Sherilyn Yang (Malaysia) Nazihah Hanis
Tournoi Féminin Val de Marne; Créteil, France; Women : Challenger 5; 16 players - $6,000	13–16 November	(Canada) Nikki Todd; 10–12, 11–8, 11–1, 11–6 (2nd PSA title)	(England) Anna Kimberley	(Scotland) Alison Thomson (Spain) Cristina Gómez	(France) Élise Romba (Switzerland) Nadia Pfister (England) Alice Green (Egypt) Amina El Rihany
Open International Niort-Venise Verte; Bessines, France; Men : Challenger 10; 24 players - $12,000	13–17 November	(United States) Shahjahan Khan; 5–11, 12–10, 11–7, 7–11, 11–2 (4th PSA title)	(France) Baptiste Masotti	(England) Ben Coleman (France) Sébastien Bonmalais	(England) Patrick Rooney (France) Fabien Verseille (Egypt) Ahmed Hosny (Kuwait) Ammar Al-Tamimi
Romanian Open; Florești, Romania; Men : Challenger 5; 16 players - $6,000	15–17 November	(Hungary) Balázs Farkas; 11–8, 4–11, 7–11, 11–8, 12–10 (4th PSA title)	(Egypt) Yehia El Nawsany	(Germany) Valentin Rapp (Spain) Bernat Jaume	(England) Robert Downer (Spain) Hugo Varela (Pakistan) Zahir Shah (Republic of Ireland) Sean Conroy
The Wimbledon Cup; London, England; Men : WSF/PSA Satellite; 32 players - $2,700 −−−−−− Women : WSF/PSA Satellite; 32 players - $1,900	15–17 November	(England) Richie Fallows; 11–8, 11–6, 6–11, 15–13	(Portugal) Rui Soares	(England) Curtis Malik (England) Sam Todd	(Scotland) Rory Stewart (Wales) Peter Creed (England) Phil Rushworth (England) Anthony Rogal
The Wimbledon Cup; London, England; Men : WSF/PSA Satellite; 32 players - $2,700 −−−−−− Women : WSF/PSA Satellite; 32 players - $1,900	15–17 November	(England) Alison Waters; 11–7, 11–9, 8–11, 11–9	(England) Millie Tomlinson	(England) Kace Bartley (Japan) Misaki Kobayashi	(South Korea) Oh Sung-hee (England) Emma Bartley (England) Torrie Malik (Scotland) Elspeth Young
Dominicana Squash Open; Santo Domingo, Dominican Republic; Men : Challenger 10; 24 players - $12,000	19–23 November	(France) Victor Crouin; 11–3, 11–4, 11–8 (9th PSA title)	(Mexico) Mario Yáñez	(United States) Christopher Gordon (Finland) Henrik Mustonen	(England) Lyell Fuller (Argentina) Robertino Pezzota (Argentina) Leandro Romiglio (Spain) Javier Martín
Channel VAS Championships; Weybridge, England; Men : World Tour Gold; 24 players - $106,000 - Draw	19–24 November	(Egypt) Karim Abdel Gawad; 8–11, 11–3, 11–1, 10–12, 11–6 (23rd PSA title)	(Egypt) Mohamed El Shorbagy	(Egypt) Mohamed Abouelghar (New Zealand) Paul Coll	(India) Saurav Ghosal (Egypt) Mazen Hesham (Wales) Joel Makin (Egypt) Marwan El Shorbagy
London Open; London, England; Men : Challenger 10; 24 players - $12,000 −−−−−− Women : Challenger 10; 24 players - $12,000	20–24 November	(England) James Willstrop; 8–11, 11–6, 11–7, 11–6 (21st PSA title)	(England) Patrick Rooney	(Belgium) Jan Van Den Herrewegen (United States) Shahjahan Khan	(Kuwait) Ammar Al-Tamimi (Wales) Emyr Evans (Pakistan) Asim Khan (Malaysia) Mohd Syafiq Kamal
London Open; London, England; Men : Challenger 10; 24 players - $12,000 −−−−−− Women : Challenger 10; 24 players - $12,000	20–24 November	(United States) Sabrina Sobhy; 11–4, 11–5, 11–2 (3rd PSA title)	(England) Jasmine Hutton	(Egypt) Menna Nasser (France) Énora Villard	(Czech Republic) Anna Serme (India) Sunayna Kuruvilla (Canada) Nikki Todd (England) Rachael Chadwick
Internazionali d'Italia; Roges, Rende, Italy; Men : Challenger 5; 32 players - $6,000 −−−−−− Women : WSF/PSA Satellite; 4 players - $1,000	20–24 November	(Wales) Elliott Morris Devred; 6–11, 13–11, 11–4, 8–11, 12–10 (1st PSA title)	(Austria) Aqeel Rehman	(Italy) Yuri Farneti (Egypt) Ahmed Hosny	(Italy) Muhammad Bilal (Czech Republic) David Zeman (Germany) Yannik Omlor (France) Edwin Clain
Internazionali d'Italia; Roges, Rende, Italy; Men : Challenger 5; 32 players - $6,000 −−−−−− Women : WSF/PSA Satellite; 4 players - $1,000	20–24 November	(Italy) Cristina Tartarone; 11–5, 11–8, 11–3	(England) Tayla Mounter	(Italy) Stella de Marco (Italy) Elena Vercillo	
Life Time Vegas Open; Las Vegas, United States; Men : Challenger 5; 24 players - $6,000	20–24 November	(England) Nick Wall; 11–6, 11–7, 7–11, 11–5 (1st PSA title)	(United States) Faraz Khan	(Canada) David Baillargeon (Egypt) Omar Marei	(Guatemala) Josué Enríquez (Mexico) Alejandro Reyes (England) Charlie Johnson (Pakistan) Syed Hamzah Bukhari
Saskatoon Movember Boast; Saskatoon, Canada; Men : Challenger 10; 24 players - $12,000	21–24 November	(Mexico) Alfredo Ávila; 11–2, 11–6, 11–7 (12th PSA title)	(Mexico) Leonel Cárdenas	(Czech Republic) Daniel Mekbib (Canada) Shawn Delierre	(Czech Republic) Martin Švec (Czech Republic) Ondřej Uherka (Canada) Cameron Seth (Canada) Nick Sachvie
Capra Bærum Open; Lysaker, Norway; Men : Challenger 5; 16 players - $6,000 −−−−−− Women : Challenger 5; 16 players - $6,000	22–24 November	(Spain) Bernat Jaume; 11–8, 9–11, 12–10, 11–7 (3rd PSA title)	(Hungary) Balázs Farkas	(Egypt) Moustafa El Sirty (England) James Peach	(Czech Republic) Jakub Solnický (Spain) Hugo Varela (Israel) Roee Avraham (Australia) Joseph White
Capra Bærum Open; Lysaker, Norway; Men : Challenger 5; 16 players - $6,000 −−−−−− Women : Challenger 5; 16 players - $6,000	22–24 November	(England) Lily Taylor; 11–3, 11–7, 11–4 (1st PSA title)	(England) Grace Gear	(Latvia) Ineta Mackeviča (Spain) Cristina Gómez	(England) Kace Bartley (England) Alice Green (England) Katie Wells (England) Charlotte Jagger
PSA Valencia; Alboraya, Spain; Men : Challenger 10; 24 players - $12,000	26–30 November	(Spain) Carlos Cornes; 9–11, 11–8, 11–6, 11–8 (7th PSA title)	(Spain) Bernat Jaume	(Egypt) Ahmed Hosny (Egypt) Moustafa El Sirty	(France) Benjamin Aubert (United States) Shahjahan Khan (France) Fabien Verseille (Finland) Henrik Mustonen
Aston & Fincher Sutton Coldfield International; Sutton Coldfield, England; Men : Challenger 5; 24 players - $6,000	26–30 November	(Belgium) Jan Van Den Herrewegen; 11–8, 11–5, 11–7 (7th PSA title)	(England) Sam Todd	(India) Abhay Singh (Kuwait) Ammar Al-Tamimi	(England) Robert Downer (England) Stuart MacGregor (England) Chris Hall (England) Mike Harris
Medicine Hat Open; Medicine Hat, Canada; Men : Challenger 5; 24 players - $6,000	27 Nov.–1 Dec.	(Czech Republic) Daniel Mekbib; 9–11, 11–9, 11–6, 4–11, 11–5 (3rd PSA title)	(England) Nick Wall	(England) Curtis Malik (Czech Republic) Martin Švec	(Switzerland) Robin Gadola (Czech Republic) Ondřej Uherka (England) Tom Walsh (Colombia) Edgar Ramírez
Chongqing International Squash Classic; Chongqing, China; Men : Challenger 5; 16 players - $6,000 −−−−−− Women : Challenger 5; 16 players - $6,000	28 Nov.–1 Dec.	(Japan) Tomotaka Endo; 11–4, 11–5, 11–7 (2nd PSA title)	(Canada) David Baillargeon	(Hong Kong) Tang Ming Hong (Egypt) Shady El Sherbiny	(Hong Kong) Matthew Lai (England) Lewis Doughty (Hong Kong) Chung Yat Long (China) Zhou Zhitao
Chongqing International Squash Classic; Chongqing, China; Men : Challenger 5; 16 players - $6,000 −−−−−− Women : Challenger 5; 16 players - $6,000	28 Nov.–1 Dec.	(Malaysia) Aifa Azman; 11–6, 11–5, 11–4 (7th PSA title)	(Egypt) Farah Momen	(Czech Republic) Anna Serme (Egypt) Amina El Rihany	(Malaysia) Nazihah Hanis (Japan) Risa Sugimoto (Czech Republic) Eva Feřteková (Malaysia) Yee Xin Ying
8eme National Squash Auvergne; Clermont-Ferrand, France; Men : WSF/PSA Satellite; 32 players - $2,500	29 Nov.–1 Dec.	(France) Auguste Dussourd; 11–13, 11–8, 11–8, 11–2	(France) Sébastien Bonmalais	(Mexico) Leonardo Vargas (France) Toufik Mekhalfi	(France) Ludovic Barraud (France) Manuel Paquemar (Mexico) Juan Carlos Vargas (France) Adrien Douillard

=== December ===
Tournament	Date	Champion	Runner-Up	Semifinalists	Quarterfinalists
Cognac Open; Châteaubernard, France; Men : Challenger 5; 24 players - $6,000	3–7 December	(England) Tom Ford; 11–4, 9–11, 11–4, 12–10 (7th PSA title)	(Hungary) Balázs Farkas	(France) Fabien Verseille (Spain) Hugo Varela	(England) Sam Todd (Wales) Elliott Morris Devred (Netherlands) Marc ter Sluis (Spain) Joel Jaume
Securian Open; St. Paul, United States; Men : Challenger 10; 16 players - $12,000	4–7 December	(Mexico) Leonel Cárdenas; 11–7, 11–5, 11–5 (8th PSA title)	(Canada) Michael McCue	(United States) Faraz Khan (Mexico) Alfredo Ávila	(Colombia) Juan Camilo Vargas (Canada) David Baillargeon (New Zealand) Evan Williams (Canada) Nick Sachvie
Life Time Betty Griffin Memorial Florida Open; Boca Raton, United States; Men : Challenger 10; 16 players - $12,000	5–8 December	(India) Vikram Malhotra; 11–6, 11–6, 11–4 (11th PSA title)	(Mexico) Jesús Camacho	(Egypt) Mazen Gamal (France) Auguste Dussourd	(Wales) Peter Creed (United States) Christopher Gordon (Argentina) Leandro Romiglio (Republic of Ireland) Sean Conroy
Monte Carlo Classic; Monte Carlo, Monaco; Women : Challenger 20; 24 players - $20,000	9–13 December	(United States) Sabrina Sobhy; 11–3, 12–10, 11–5 (4th PSA title)	(Egypt) Yathreb Adel	(Egypt) Zeina Mickawy (England) Rachael Chadwick	(France) Énora Villard (Australia) Donna Lobban (England) Jasmine Hutton (Finland) Emilia Soini
IMET PSA Open; Bratislava, Slovakia; Men : Challenger 5; 24 players - $6,000	11–14 December	(Czech Republic) Daniel Mekbib; 11–7, 7–11, 11–8, 6–11, 11–8 (4th PSA title)	(Czech Republic) Viktor Byrtus	(Wales) Elliott Morris Devred (Spain) Hugo Varela	(Spain) Iván Pérez (Hungary) Balázs Farkas (England) Miles Jenkins (Czech Republic) Jakub Solnický
Boston Open; Boston, England; Men : WSF/PSA Satellite; 32 players - $3,500 −−−−−− Women : WSF/PSA Satellite; 32 players - $3,500	13–15 December	(England) Joe Lee; 11–4, 11–5, 11–2	(England) Ben Smith	(England) Tom Walsh (England) Ben Sockett	(England) Kyle Finch (England) Mark Fuller (England) Robert Downer (England) Adam Turner
Boston Open; Boston, England; Men : WSF/PSA Satellite; 32 players - $3,500 −−−−−− Women : WSF/PSA Satellite; 32 players - $3,500	13–15 December	(England) Sarah-Jane Perry; 8–11, 7–11, 11–3, 11–5, 11–7	(England) Millie Tomlinson	(England) Julianne Courtice (Belgium) Tinne Gilis	(France) Coline Aumard (Canada) Hollie Naughton (England) Lucy Beecroft (United States) Haley Mendez
Serena Huawei Pakistan International; Islamabad, Pakistan; Men : Challenger 20; 24 players - $20,000 −−−−−− Women : Challenger 10; 24 players - $12,000	15–19 December	(Pakistan) Tayyab Aslam; 11–8, 13–11, 11–4 (7th PSA title)	(Pakistan) Farhan Mehboob	(Egypt) Youssef Ibrahim (Egypt) Mohamed ElSherbini	(Pakistan) Asim Khan (Pakistan) Farhan Zaman (Portugal) Rui Soares (Egypt) Yahya Elnawasany
Serena Huawei Pakistan International; Islamabad, Pakistan; Men : Challenger 20; 24 players - $20,000 −−−−−− Women : Challenger 10; 24 players - $12,000	15–19 December	(United States) Sabrina Sobhy; 11–7, 11–9, 11–9 (5th PSA title)	(Egypt) Hana Moataz	(Egypt) Farida Mohamed (Egypt) Menna Hamed	(Malaysia) Wen Li Lai (Switzerland) Cindy Merlo (Egypt) Farah Momen (Switzerland) Nadia Pfister
HCL SRFI Indian Tour – Mumbai Leg; Mumbai, India; Men : Challenger 20; 24 players - $20,000 −−−−−− Women : Challenger 10; 24 players - $12,000	17–21 December	(India) Harinder Pal Sandhu; 11–5, 11–6, 11–7 (11th PSA title)	(Japan) Tomotaka Endo	(India) Abhishek Agarwal (India) Aditya Jagtap	(Scotland) Angus Gillams (India) Velavan Senthilkumar (Czech Republic) Ondřej Uherka (India) Abhay Singh
HCL SRFI Indian Tour – Mumbai Leg; Mumbai, India; Men : Challenger 20; 24 players - $20,000 −−−−−− Women : Challenger 10; 24 players - $12,000	17–21 December	(Egypt) Hana Ramadan; 11–8, 6–11, 11–4, 11–3 (5th PSA title)	(England) Lucy Turmel	(India) Tanvi Khanna (England) Anna Kimberley	(India) Sunayna Kuruvilla (India) Aishwarya Khubchandani (Malaysia) Ooi Kah Yan (Malaysia) Rachel Arnold
13th DG Rangers Sindh Squash Championship (Pakistan) Karachi, India; Men : Challenger 10; 24 players - $12,000	20–24 December	(Pakistan) Tayyab Aslam; 5–11, 11–6, 11–7, 11–7 (8th PSA title)	(Pakistan) Danish Atlas Khan	(Pakistan) Asim Khan (Pakistan) Waqas Mehboob	(Pakistan) Zahir Shah (Italy) Muhammad Bilal (Pakistan) Farhan Zaman (Pakistan) Israr Ahmed
CIB Cairo Tour 3 Cairo, Egypt; Men : Challenger 5; 24 players - $6,000 −−−−−− Women : Challenger 5; 24 players - $6,000	23–27 December	(Egypt) Marwan Tarek; 11–8, 1–11, 11–7, 11–8 (1st PSA title)	(Egypt) Yahya Elnawasany	(Egypt) Karim Elbarbary (Egypt) Khaled Labib	(Egypt) Abdallah Elmasry (Egypt) Andrew Shoukry (Egypt) Ahmed Hosny (Mexico) Juan Carlos Vargas
CIB Cairo Tour 3 Cairo, Egypt; Men : Challenger 5; 24 players - $6,000 −−−−−− Women : Challenger 5; 24 players - $6,000	23–27 December	(Egypt) Jana Shiha; 9–11, 11–5, 9–11, 11–4, 11–8 (3rd PSA title)	(Egypt) Hana Moataz	(Egypt) Salma El Tayeb (Egypt) Menna Walid	(Egypt) Nour Heikal (Egypt) Malak Kamal (Egypt) Nour Aboulmakarim (Egypt) Kenzy Ayman

=== January ===
Tournament	Date	Champion	Runner-Up	Semifinalists	Quarterfinalists
J.P. Morgan Tournament of Champions; Manhattan, New York City, United States; Men : World Tour Platinum; 48 players - $195,000 - Draw −−−−−− Women : World Tour Platinum; 48 players - $195,000 - Draw	9–17 January	(Egypt) Mohamed El Shorbagy; 9–11, 11–7, 11–7, 11–5 (40th PSA title)	(Egypt) Tarek Momen	(Egypt) Ali Farag (Egypt) Karim Abdel Gawad	(Germany) Simon Rösner (New Zealand) Paul Coll (Wales) Joel Makin (Egypt) Mostafa Asal
J.P. Morgan Tournament of Champions; Manhattan, New York City, United States; Men : World Tour Platinum; 48 players - $195,000 - Draw −−−−−− Women : World Tour Platinum; 48 players - $195,000 - Draw	9–17 January	(France) Camille Serme; 11–8, 11–6, 11–7 (15th PSA title)	(Egypt) Nour El Sherbini	(Egypt) Nouran Gohar (New Zealand) Joelle King	(Egypt) Raneem El Weleily (England) Alison Waters (Egypt) Salma Hany (England) Sarah-Jane Perry
Airport Squash & Fitness Xmas Challenger; Berlin, Germany; Men : Challenger 5; 24 players - $6,000	14–18 January	(Egypt) Moustafa El Sirty; 9–11, 10–12, 11–8, 11–9, 12–10 (3rd PSA title)	(Colombia) Juan Camilo Vargas	(Belgium) Jan Van Den Herrewegen (Portugal) Rui Soares	(France) Fabien Verseille (England) Sam Todd (Hungary) Balázs Farkas (Israel) Roee Avraham
Pittsburgh Open; Pittsburgh, United States; Men : World Tour Bronze; 24 players - $52,500 - Draw	22–26 January	(Egypt) Fares Dessouky; 11–7, 11–4, 11–9 (3rd PSA title)	(India) Saurav Ghosal	(Egypt) Omar Mosaad (France) Grégoire Marche	(New Zealand) Campbell Grayson (Germany) Raphael Kandra (Egypt) Mohamed ElSherbini (Mexico) César Salazar
National Masculin Lorraine Motors; Maxéville, France; Men : WSF/PSA Satellite; 32 players - $2,500	25–26 January	(France) Sébastien Bonmalais; 9–11, 11–6, 9–2, rtd.	(France) Auguste Dussourd	(France) Toufik Mekhalfi (France) Edwin Clain	(France) Manuel Paquemar (France) Romain Bouger (Belgium) Lowie Delbeke (Belgium) Christopher Votion
Carol Weymuller Open; Brooklyn, NY, United States; Women : World Tour Bronze; 24 players - $51,250 - Draw	22–27 January	(Egypt) Nouran Gohar; 11–9, 11–5, 11–2 (9th PSA title)	(Egypt) Nour El Tayeb	(France) Camille Serme (New Zealand) Joelle King	(Egypt) Salma Hany (Egypt) Mariam Metwally (Malaysia) Low Wee Wern (Australia) Donna Lobban
Odense Open; Odense, Denmark; Men : Challenger 5; 24 players - $6,000	28 Jan.–1 Feb.	(Belgium) Jan Van Den Herrewegen; 11–8, 8–11, 8–11, 11–2, 11–8 (8th PSA title)	(England) Sam Todd	(England) Nick Wall (Hungary) Balázs Farkas	(England) Joe Lee (Denmark) Kristian Frost (Italy) Yuri Farneti (Netherlands) Roshan Bharos
Seattle Open; Seattle, United States; Women : Challenger 10; 16 players - $12,000	29 Jan.–1 Feb.	(Canada) Danielle Letourneau; 11–5, 6–11, 11–9, 11–6 (3rd PSA title)	(Hong Kong) Vanessa Chu	(Hong Kong) Lee Ka Yi (England) Lily Taylor	(United States) Laila Sedky (Netherlands) Elena Wagenmans (England) Alicia Mead (Egypt) Amina El Rihany
Savcor Finnish Open; Mikkeli, Finland; Women : Challenger 10; 24 players - $12,000	29 Jan.–2 Feb.	(Netherlands) Milou van der Heijden; 11–6, 11–9, 11–9 (8th PSA title)	(Finland) Emilia Soini	(England) Lucy Turmel (Switzerland) Ambre Allinckx	(England) Alice Green (France) Énora Villard (Netherlands) Tessa ter Sluis (Colombia) Catalina Peláez
Edinburgh Sports Club Open; Edinburgh, Scotland; Men : Open Invitational; 24 players - £15,000 −−−−−− Women : Challenger 20; 24 players - $20,000	29 Jan.–2 Feb.	(Egypt) Karim Abdel Gawad; 11–8, 11–8, 11–4	(Scotland) Greg Lobban	(England) Daryl Selby (Wales) Joel Makin	(England) Declan James (Scotland) Alan Clyne (New Zealand) Paul Coll (Wales) Peter Creed
Edinburgh Sports Club Open; Edinburgh, Scotland; Men : Open Invitational; 24 players - £15,000 −−−−−− Women : Challenger 20; 24 players - $20,000	29 Jan.–2 Feb.	(Australia) Donna Lobban; 6–11, 11–9, 11–9, 7–11, 11–8 (12th PSA title)	(England) Julianne Courtice	(South Africa) Alexandra Fuller (England) Rachael Chadwick	(England) Emily Whitlock (Scotland) Lisa Aitken (Japan) Satomi Watanabe (Scotland) Alison Thomson
EM Noll Classic; Philadelphia, United States; Men : Challenger 10; 16 players - $12,000 −−−−−− Women : Challenger 10; 16 players - $12,000	30 Jan.–2 Feb.	(England) Nathan Lake; 8–11, 11–8, 11–4, 11–8 (4th PSA title)	(Egypt) Youssef Ibrahim	(Egypt) Shehab Essam (United States) Todd Harrity	(United States) Faraz Khan (Canada) Shawn Delierre (Switzerland) Dimitri Steinmann (England) Jaymie Haycocks
EM Noll Classic; Philadelphia, United States; Men : Challenger 10; 16 players - $12,000 −−−−−− Women : Challenger 10; 16 players - $12,000	30 Jan.–2 Feb.	(United States) Olivia Fiechter; 5–11, 7–11, 11–2, 11–7, 11–9 (2nd PSA title)	(Egypt) Hana Ramadan	(Poland) Karina Tyma (Canada) Nicole Bunyan	(United States) Haley Mendez (United States) Marina Stefanoni (France) Marie Stephan (Switzerland) Cindy Merlo
HCL SRFI Indian Tour – Jaipur Leg; Jaipur, India; Men : Challenger 5; 32 players - $6,000 −−−−−− Women : Challenger 10; 24 players - $12,000	30 Jan.–2 Feb.	(Egypt) Ibrahim Elkabbani; 12–10, 11–3, 4–11, 11–5 (1st PSA title)	(India) Abhishek Pradhan	(India) Abhishek Agarwal (Iran) Navid Maleksabet	(South Korea) Ko Young-jo (India) Sandeep Ramachandran (India) Rahul Baitha (Iran) Mohammad Kashani
HCL SRFI Indian Tour – Jaipur Leg; Jaipur, India; Men : Challenger 5; 32 players - $6,000 −−−−−− Women : Challenger 10; 24 players - $12,000	30 Jan.–2 Feb.	(Egypt) Jana Shiha; 11–8, 9–11, 11–9, 11–7 (4th PSA title)	(Egypt) Salma El Tayeb	(Malaysia) Aifa Azman (Malaysia) Ooi Kah Yan	(India) Sunayna Kuruvilla (Hong Kong) Tong Tsz Wing (Canada) Nikki Todd (Malaysia) Wen Li Lai
Open TLS Blagnac; Blagnac, France; Men : WSF/PSA Satellite; 64 players - $2,500	31 Jan.–2 Feb.	(France) Auguste Dussourd; 11–3, 11–0, 11–6	(France) Christophe André	(France) Johan Bouquet (France) Toufik Mekhalfi	(France) Edwin Clain (France) Adrien Douillard (France) Joshua Phinéra (France) Paul Gonzalez
Cleveland Classic; Cleveland, United States; Women : World Tour Bronze; 24 players - $51,250 - Draw	30 Jan.–3 Feb.	(Egypt) Nour El Tayeb; 10–12, 14–12, 11–5, 11–4 (10th PSA title)	(England) Sarah-Jane Perry	(New Zealand) Joelle King (India) Joshna Chinappa	(Hong Kong) Annie Au (England) Alison Waters (Egypt) Farida Mohamed (United States) Olivia Blatchford Clyne

=== February ===
Tournament	Date	Champion	Runner-Up	Semifinalists	Quarterfinalists
14th CNS International Squash Tournament; Karachi, Pakistan; Men : Challenger 20; 24 players - $20,000	4–8 February	(Malaysia) Ivan Yuen; 7–11, 11–4, 11–4, 11–7 (11th PSA title)	(Pakistan) Tayyab Aslam	(Egypt) Mazen Gamal (Hong Kong) Henry Leung	(Hong Kong) Alex Lau (Egypt) Moustafa El Sirty (Pakistan) Asim Khan (Malaysia) Mohd Syafiq Kamal
The Racquet Club Pro-Series; St. Louis, United States; Women : Challenger 20; 24 players - $20,000	4–8 February	(Canada) Hollie Naughton; 11–7, 11–6, 13–11 (3rd PSA title)	(United States) Olivia Fiechter	(Canada) Danielle Letourneau (Egypt) Hana Ramadan	(England) Lily Taylor (England) Alicia Mead (Colombia) Catalina Peláez (Mexico) Diana García
Motor City Open; Bloomfield Hills, United States; Men : World Tour Silver; 24 players - $76,000	5–9 February	(Peru) Diego Elías; 11–4, 11–5, 11–4 (7th PSA title)	(Egypt) Mohamed ElSherbini	(Hong Kong) Leo Au (France) Benjamin Aubert	(Qatar) Abdulla Al-Tamimi (Egypt) Marwan El Shorbagy (Colombia) Miguel Ángel Rodríguez (Mexico) César Salazar
Life Time Atlanta Open; Sandy Springs, United States; Men : Challenger 10; 24 players - $12,000	5–9 February	(Jamaica) Christopher Binnie; 14–12, 11–8, 11–6 (4th PSA title)	(Canada) David Baillargeon	(Colombia) Juan Camilo Vargas (Japan) Tomotaka Endo	(Brazil) Guilherme Melo (Finland) Henrik Mustonen (United States) Faraz Khan (Malaysia) Asyraf Azan
Linear Logistics Bankers Hall Pro-Am; Calgary, Canada; Men : Challenger 10; 16 players - $12,000	6–9 February	(Switzerland) Dimitri Steinmann; 11–9, 11–6, 12–10 (7th PSA title)	(Wales) Emyr Evans	(United States) Christopher Gordon (Portugal) Rui Soares	(Mexico) Leonel Cárdenas (Belgium) Joeri Hapers (England) Curtis Malik (India) Abhay Singh
Assante Wealth Management Carter Classic; Toronto, Canada; Men : Challenger 10; 16 players - $12,000	10–13 February	(England) Lyell Fuller; 11–4, 11–8, 11–9 (3rd PSA title)	(Argentina) Leandro Romiglio	(Canada) Michael McCue (Mexico) Mario Yáñez	(England) Robert Downer (Italy) Yuri Farneti (Czech Republic) Martin Švec (Colombia) Juan Camilo Vargas
Oregon Open; Portland, United States; Men : Challenger 20; 24 players - $20,000	11–15 February	(India) Vikram Malhotra; 10–12, 11–9, 11–8, 11–4 (12th PSA title)	(Mexico) Leonel Cárdenas	(Czech Republic) Daniel Mekbib (Mexico) Jesús Camacho	(Switzerland) Dimitri Steinmann (United States) Christopher Gordon (United States) Spencer Lovejoy (Wales) Peter Creed
Chronicle Wealth Guilfoyle PSA Classic; Toronto, Canada; Men : Challenger 5; 24 players - $6,000	18–22 February	(Czech Republic) Daniel Mekbib; 11–4, 11–5, 11–9 (5th PSA title)	(Italy) Yuri Farneti	(Canada) Nick Sachvie (Canada) Cameron Seth	(Brazil) Guilherme Melo (England) Tom Walsh (Argentina) Leandro Romiglio (Switzerland) Robin Gadola
Mount Royal University Open; Calgary, Canada; Men : Challenger 5; 24 players - $6,000	19–23 February	(Canada) Graeme Schnell; 11–4, 11–7, 11–3 (2nd PSA title)	(Canada) David Baillargeon	(South Africa) Tristan Eysele (Canada) Connor Turk	(Scotland) Rory Stewart (Pakistan) Naveed Rehman (France) Edwin Clain (Colombia) Santiago Orozco
Bahl & Gaynor Cincinnati Cup; Cincinnati, United States; Women : World Tour Bronze; 24 players - $51,250	20–24 February	(United States) Amanda Sobhy; 6–11, 11–5, 11–9, 11–1 (17th PSA title)	(England) Sarah-Jane Perry	(Egypt) Hania El Hammamy (United States) Olivia Blatchford Clyne	(Malaysia) Low Wee Wern (Belgium) Tinne Gilis (Egypt) Rowan Elaraby (Belgium) Nele Gilis
Troilus Gold Canada Cup; Toronto, Canada; Men : World Tour Silver; 24 players - $79,500	21–25 February	(Egypt) Tarek Momen; 15–13, 11–5, 11–8 (8th PSA title)	(New Zealand) Paul Coll	(Peru) Diego Elías (France) Mathieu Castagnet	(Wales) Joel Makin (Egypt) Mazen Hesham (Mexico) César Salazar (England) Daryl Selby
CIB Alexandria Tour 4 Alexandria, Egypt; Men : Challenger 5; 24 players - $6,000 −−−−−− Women : Challenger 5; 24 players - $6,000	24–28 February	(Egypt) Yahya Elnawasany; 11–7, 14–16, 4–11, 11–3, 11–2 (1st PSA title)	(Egypt) Abdallah Elmasry	(Egypt) Khaled Labib (Egypt) Ziad Ibrahim	(Egypt) Seif Shenawy (Pakistan) Noor Zaman (Egypt) Hazem Helmy (Kuwait) Ammar Al-Tamimi
CIB Alexandria Tour 4 Alexandria, Egypt; Men : Challenger 5; 24 players - $6,000 −−−−−− Women : Challenger 5; 24 players - $6,000	24–28 February	(Egypt) Sana Ibrahim; 11–8, 11–4, 11–3 (1st PSA title)	(Egypt) Haya Ali	(Egypt) Jana Shiha (Egypt) Kenzy Ayman	(Egypt) Nardine Garas (Egypt) Menna Walid (Egypt) Habiba El Defrawy (Egypt) Salma El Tayeb
Hampshire Open; Eastleigh, England; Men : Challenger 5; 16 players - $6,000	27 Feb.–1 Mar.	(Japan) Ryosei Kobayashi; 7–11, 11–3, 10–12, 13–11, 11–2 (3rd PSA title)	(Hungary) Balázs Farkas	(Czech Republic) Jakub Solnický (England) Robert Downer	(Switzerland) Robin Gadola (England) Miles Jenkins (England) Connor Sheen (France) Fabien Verseille
Esperance Open; Esperance, Australia; Men : WSF/PSA Satellite; 16 players - $2,000	29 Feb.–1 Mar.	(Australia) Mike Corren; 11–5, 11–5, 11–7	(Australia) Tim Cowell	(Australia) David Ilich (Australia) Scott Jerome	(Australia) Remi Young (Australia) Oscar Curtis (New Zealand) Dylan Tasker (Australia) Lewis Christie
The Windy City Open; Chicago, United States; Men : World Tour Platinum; 48 players - $250,000 −−−−−− Women : World Tour Platinum; 48 players - $250,000	27 Feb.–4 Mar.	(Egypt) Ali Farag; 12–14, 9–11, 11–7, 11–6, 11–1 (19th PSA title)	(New Zealand) Paul Coll	(Egypt) Karim Abdel Gawad (Egypt) Tarek Momen	(Spain) Borja Golán (Germany) Simon Rösner (Egypt) Mohamed El Shorbagy (Peru) Diego Elías
The Windy City Open; Chicago, United States; Men : World Tour Platinum; 48 players - $250,000 −−−−−− Women : World Tour Platinum; 48 players - $250,000	27 Feb.–4 Mar.	(Egypt) Nour El Sherbini; 11–8, 8–11, 11–8, 6–11, 11–9 (21st PSA title)	(Egypt) Raneem El Weleily	(Egypt) Nouran Gohar (England) Sarah-Jane Perry	(Egypt) Rowan Elaraby (France) Camille Serme (United States) Amanda Sobhy (United States) Olivia Blatchford Clyne

=== March ===
Tournament	Date	Champion	Runner-Up	Semifinalists	Quarterfinalists
CFO Consulting Women's Squash Week; Calgary, Canada; Women : Challenger 20; 24 players - $20,000	4–8 March	(Canada) Danielle Letourneau; 7–11, 6–11, 11–4, 11–5, 11–9 (4th PSA title)	(England) Julianne Courtice	(United States) Olivia Fiechter (Netherlands) Milou van der Heijden	(Egypt) Menna Hamed (Hong Kong) Lee Ka Yi (Hong Kong) Vanessa Chu (Finland) Emilia Soini
Qualico Manitoba Open; Winnipeg, Canada; Men : Challenger 20; 16 players - $10,000	5–8 March	(England) Nathan Lake; 11–5, 5–11, 11–8, 11–5 (5th PSA title)	(Mexico) Leonel Cárdenas	(United States) Shahjahan Khan (Jamaica) Christopher Binnie	(England) Sam Todd (Canada) Nick Sachvie (Egypt) Mazen Gamal (Canada) Michael McCue
Barfoot & Thompson Auckland Open; Auckland, New Zealand; Men : Challenger 5; 24 players - $6,000 −−−−−− Women : WSF/PSA Satellite; 24 players - $1,000	5–8 March	(Hong Kong) Henry Leung; 11–3, 11–8, 11–4 (5th PSA title)	(New Zealand) Evan Williams	(Hong Kong) Tang Ming Hong (Malaysia) Darren Rahul Pragasam	(Hong Kong) Wong Chi Him (Australia) Nicholas Calvert (New Zealand) Elijah Thomas (Hong Kong) Matthew Lai
Barfoot & Thompson Auckland Open; Auckland, New Zealand; Men : Challenger 5; 24 players - $6,000 −−−−−− Women : WSF/PSA Satellite; 24 players - $1,000	5–8 March	(New Zealand) Lana Harrison; 11–7, 8–11, 11–8, 4–11, 11–6	(New Zealand) Emma Millar	(South Korea) Heo Min-gyeong (New Zealand) Abbie Palmer	(South Korea) Song Dong-ju (South Korea) Yang Yeon-soo (New Zealand) Dora Galloway (New Zealand) Ella Lash
Canary Wharf Classic; London, England; Men : World Tour Gold; 24 players - $109,500	8–13 March	(Egypt) Mohamed El Shorbagy; 11–8, 10–12, 11–6, 15–13 (41st PSA title)	(Egypt) Ali Farag	(Egypt) Tarek Momen (Egypt) Marwan El Shorbagy	(India) Saurav Ghosal (Peru) Diego Elías (Egypt) Fares Dessouky (Scotland) Greg Lobban
CIB Black Ball Squash Open; New Cairo, Egypt; Women : World Tour Platinum; 48 players - $180,500	8–14 March	(Egypt) Hania El Hammamy; 11–6, 9–11, 12–10, 8–11, 13–11 (5th PSA title)	(Egypt) Nour El Sherbini	(England) Sarah-Jane Perry (Egypt) Nour El Tayeb	(Egypt) Raneem El Weleily (United States) Amanda Sobhy (France) Coline Aumard (Egypt) Nada Abbas
Queen City Open; Regina, Canada; Women : Challenger 20; 24 players - $20,000	11–15 March	(Canada) Danielle Letourneau; 6–11, 11–9, 11–8, 11–4 (5th PSA title)	(Egypt) Menna Hamed	(England) Anna Kimberley (Canada) Nikki Todd	(Hong Kong) Lee Ka Yi (Scotland) Alison Thomson (Wales) Ali Loke (Finland) Emilia Soini
~~Bermuda Open~~; Devonshire, Bermuda; Men : Challenger 5; 16 players - $6,000 −−−−−− Women : Challenger 5; 16 players - $6,000	17–20 March	Events cancelled due to COVID-19 pandemic			
~~Grasshopper Cup~~; Zürich, Switzerland; Men : World Tour Gold; 24 players - $109,000	17–22 March	Events cancelled due to COVID-19 pandemic			
~~Grasshopper Cup~~; Zürich, Switzerland; Women : World Tour Bronze; 24 players - $56,500	17–22 March	Events cancelled due to COVID-19 pandemic			
~~The Lethbridge Pro-Am~~; Lethbridge, Canada; Men : Challenger 10; 16 players - $12,000	19–22 March	Events cancelled due to COVID-19 pandemic			
~~CIB Cairo Tour 4~~; Cairo, Egypt; Men : Challenger 5; 24 players - $6,000 −−−−−− Women : Challenger 5; 24 players - $6,000		Events cancelled due to COVID-19 pandemic			
~~CIB Cairo Tour 4~~; Cairo, Egypt; Men : Challenger 5; 24 players - $6,000 −−−−−− Women : Challenger 5; 24 players - $6,000	19–23 March	Events cancelled due to COVID-19 pandemic			
~~Annecy Rose Open~~; Seynod, France; Women : Challenger 20; 24 players - $20,000	24–28 March	Events cancelled due to COVID-19 pandemic			
~~INFINITUM Squash Open~~; Sudbury, United States; Men : Challenger 10; 24 players - $12,000 −−−−−− Women : Challenger 10; 24 players - $12,000	24–28 March	Events cancelled due to COVID-19 pandemic			
~~Subbotnik PSA Open~~; Moscow, Russia; Men : Challenger 5; 16 players - $6,000	27–30 March	Events cancelled due to COVID-19 pandemic			
~~Colwyn Classic~~; Rhos-on-Sea, Wales; Women : Challenger 20; 24 players - $20,000	27–31 March	Events cancelled due to COVID-19 pandemic			
~~Charlottesville Pro Challenger~~; Charlottesville, United States; Men : Challenger 5; 24 players - $6,000	30 Mar.–4 Apr.	Events cancelled due to COVID-19 pandemic			
~~Kalo Tortola Classic~~; Road Town, British Virgin Islands; Men : Challenger 10; 24 players - $12,000	31 Mar.–4 Apr.	Events cancelled due to COVID-19 pandemic			

=== April ===
Tournament	Date	Champion	Runner-Up	Semifinalists	Quarterfinalists
~~SOAP Engineering Texas Open~~; Houston, United States; Women : Challenger 30; 24 players - $30,000	1–5 April	Events cancelled due to COVID-19 pandemic			
~~Hazlow Electronics Rochester Pro-Am~~; Rochester, United States; Men : Challenger 5; 24 players - $6,000	1–5 April	Events cancelled due to COVID-19 pandemic			
~~Sandgate MS Open~~; Deagon, Australia; Women : Challenger 5; 16 players - $6,000	3–6 April	Events cancelled due to COVID-19 pandemic			
~~Louisville Open~~; Louisville, United States; Men : Challenger 10; 16 players - $12,000	7–10 April	Events cancelled due to COVID-19 pandemic			
~~Virgin Gorda Classic~~; Virgin Gorda, British Virgin Islands; Men : Challenger 10; 24 players - $12,000	7–11 April	Events cancelled due to COVID-19 pandemic			
~~Life Time Philadelphia Open~~; Philadelphia, United States; Men : Challenger 10; 24 players - $12,000	8–12 April	Events cancelled due to COVID-19 pandemic			
~~El Gouna International Squash Open~~; El Gouna, Egypt; Men : World Tour Platinum; 48 players - $196,500 −−−−−− Women : World Tour Platinum; 48 players - $196,500	8–17 April	Events cancelled due to COVID-19 pandemic			
~~Vernon Optometry Squash Open~~; Vernon, Canada; Men : Challenger 5; 24 players - $6,000	15–19 April	Events cancelled due to COVID-19 pandemic			
~~Cincinnati Queen City Open~~; Cincinnati, United States; Men : Challenger 10; 24 players - $12,000	15–19 April	Events cancelled due to COVID-19 pandemic			
~~HCL SRFI Indian Tour – Indore Leg~~; Indore, India; Men : Challenger 5; 32 players - $6,000 −−−−−− Women : Challenger 5; 24 players - $6,000	18–21 April	Events cancelled due to COVID-19 pandemic			
~~SRAM PSA 1~~; Bukit Jalil, Malaysia; Men : Challenger 5; 24 players - $6,000 −−−−−− Women : Challenger 5; 24 players - $6,000	20–23 April	Events cancelled due to COVID-19 pandemic			
~~Assore & Balwin Johannesburg Open~~; Johannesburg, South Africa; Men : Challenger 5; 24 players - $6,000 −−−−−− Women : Challenger 5; 24 players - $6,000	20–24 April	Events cancelled due to COVID-19 pandemic			
~~Lima Open~~; Lima, Peru; Men : World Tour Gold; 24 players - $52,000	20–25 April	Events cancelled due to COVID-19 pandemic			
~~Cannon Kirk Irish Squash Open~~ (Republic of Ireland) Dublin, Ireland; Men : Challenger 20; 24 players - $20,000 −−−−−− Women : Challenger 20; 24 players - $20,000	21–25 April	Events cancelled due to COVID-19 pandemic			
~~Sekisui Open~~; Kriens, Switzerland −−−−−− Men : Challenger 10; 24 players - $12,000; Women : Challenger 5; 24 players - $6,000	21–25 April	Events cancelled due to COVID-19 pandemic			
~~Madison Open~~; Madison, United States; Men : Challenger 10; 16 players - $12,000	22–25 April	Events cancelled due to COVID-19 pandemic			
~~Richmond Open~~; Richmond, United States; Women : Challenger 10; 16 players - $12,000	22–25 April	Events cancelled due to COVID-19 pandemic			
~~HCL SRFI Indian Tour – Chennai Leg~~; Chennai, India; Men : Challenger 5; 32 players - $6,000 −−−−−− Women : Challenger 5; 24 players - $6,000	26–29 April	Events cancelled due to COVID-19 pandemic			
~~WP Keith Grainger Memorial UCT Open~~; Cape Town, South Africa; Men : Challenger 5; 24 players - $6,000 −−−−−− Women : WSF/PSA Satellite; 16 players - $1,000	27 Apr.–1 May	Events cancelled due to COVID-19 pandemic			
~~Hyder Trophy~~; New York City, United States; Men : Challenger 10; 24 players - $12,000	29 Apr.–3 May	Events cancelled due to COVID-19 pandemic			

=== May ===
Tournament	Date	Champion	Runner-Up	Semifinalists	Quarterfinalists
~~HCL SRFI Indian Tour – Trivandrum Leg~~; Trivandrum, India; Men : Challenger 5; 32 players - $6,000 −−−−−− Women : Challenger 5; 24 players - $6,000	2–6 May	Events cancelled due to COVID-19 pandemic			
~~Open International des Volcans~~; Clermont-Ferrand, France; Women : Challenger 5; 24 players - $6,000	6–9 May	Events cancelled due to COVID-19 pandemic			
~~Manchester Open~~; Manchester, England; Men : World Tour Silver; 24 players - $78,500 −−−−−− Women : World Tour Silver; 24 players - $78,500	6–10 May	Events cancelled due to COVID-19 pandemic			
~~CityView Open~~; Long Island City, NY, United States; Men : Challenger 5; 24 players - $6,000	6–10 May	Events cancelled due to COVID-19 pandemic			
~~West of Ireland Open~~ (Republic of Ireland) Galway, Ireland; Men : Challenger 10; 24 players - $12,000	12–16 May	Events cancelled due to COVID-19 pandemic			
~~The Northern Open~~; Manchester, England; Women : Challenger 10; 24 players - $12,000	13–17 May	Events cancelled due to COVID-19 pandemic			
~~Open de Mulhouse~~; Mulhouse, France; Women : Challenger 5; 24 players - $6,000	13–17 May	Events cancelled due to COVID-19 pandemic			
~~The Wimbledon Club Open~~; London, England; Men : World Tour Bronze; 24 players - $51,250	17–22 May	Events cancelled due to COVID-19 pandemic			
~~AnyósPark Open~~; La Massana, Andorra; Men : Challenger 10; 24 players - $12,000 −−−−−− Women : Challenger 5; 24 players - $6,000	26–30 May	Events cancelled due to COVID-19 pandemic			
~~Resistencia Open~~; Resistencia, Argentina; Men : Challenger 10; 24 players - $12,000	26–30 May	Events cancelled due to COVID-19 pandemic			
~~Allam British Open~~; Hull, England; Men : World Tour Platinum; 48 players - $177,500 −−−−−− Women : World Tour Platinum; 48 players - $177,500	25–31 May	Events cancelled due to COVID-19 pandemic			
~~City of Kalgoorlie Boulder Golden Open~~; Kalgoorlie, Australia; Men : Challenger 5; 24 players - $6,000 −−−−−− Women : Challenger 5; 16 players - $6,000	30 May–1 Jun.	Events cancelled due to COVID-19 pandemic			

=== June ===
Tournament	Date	Champion	Runner-Up	Semifinalists	Quarterfinalists
~~SRAM PSA 2~~; Kuala Lumpur, Malaysia; Men : Challenger 5; 24 players - $6,000 −−−−−− Women : Challenger 5; 24 players - $6,000	2–5 June	Events cancelled due to COVID-19 pandemic			
~~Trident Machines/Colin Payne Kent Open~~; Tunbridge Wells, England; Men : Challenger 5; 16 players - $6,000	3–6 June	Events cancelled due to COVID-19 pandemic			
~~HCL SRFI Indian Tour – Pune Leg~~; Pune, India; Men : Challenger 5; 32 players - $6,000 −−−−−− Women : Challenger 5; 24 players - $6,000	13–16 June	Events cancelled due to COVID-19 pandemic			
~~Austrian Open~~; Salzburg, Austria; Men : Challenger 5; 16 players - $6,000	17–20 June	Events cancelled due to COVID-19 pandemic			
~~MSquash Open~~; Port Chester, United States; Men : Challenger 5; 16 players - $6,000	22–25 June	Events cancelled due to COVID-19 pandemic			
~~City of Greater Bendigo International~~; Bendigo, Australia; Men : Challenger 5; 16 players - $6,000 −−−−−− Women : Challenger 5; 16 players - $6,000	24–28 June	Events cancelled due to COVID-19 pandemic			

=== July ===
Tournament	Date	Champion	Runner-Up	Semifinalists	Quarterfinalists
~~Victorian Open~~; Wheelers Hill, Australia; Men : Challenger 5; 16 players - $6,000 −−−−−− Women : Challenger 5; 16 players - $6,000	1–5 July	Events cancelled due to COVID-19 pandemic			
~~HCL SRFI Indian Tour – Noida Leg~~; Noida, India; Men : Challenger 5; 24 players - $6,000 −−−−−− Women : Challenger 5; 24 players - $6,000	11–15 July	Events cancelled due to COVID-19 pandemic			
~~City of Greater Shepparton International~~; Shepparton, Australia; Men : Challenger 5; 24 players - $6,000 −−−−−− Women : Challenger 5; 24 players - $6,000	29 Jul.–2 Aug.	Events cancelled due to COVID-19 pandemic			

=== PSA World Tour Finals ===
Due to play on 15–20 June 2020, the World Tour Finals were postponed to 28 September–3 October due to COVID-19 pandemic.

Tournament	Date	Champion	Runner-Up	Semifinalists	Quarterfinalists
CIB PSA World Tour Finals; Cairo, Egypt; Men : World Tour Finals; 8 players - $185,000 - Draw −−−−−− Women : World Tour Finals; 8 players - $185,000 - Draw	28 Sep.–3 Oct.	(Egypt) Marwan El Shorbagy; 11–6, 11–5, 11–3 (1st PSA Finals title) (11th PSA title)	(Egypt) Karim Abdel Gawad	(Egypt) Ali Farag (Wales) Joel Makin	(Egypt) Tarek Momen (Peru) Diego Elías (Germany) Simon Rösner (New Zealand) Paul Coll
CIB PSA World Tour Finals; Cairo, Egypt; Men : World Tour Finals; 8 players - $185,000 - Draw −−−−−− Women : World Tour Finals; 8 players - $185,000 - Draw	28 Sep.–3 Oct.	(Egypt) Hania El Hammamy; 9–11, 9–11, 11–9, 11–4, 11–3 (1st PSA Finals title) (6th PSA title)	(Egypt) Nour El Tayeb	(New Zealand) Joelle King (Egypt) Nour El Sherbini	(France) Camille Serme (Egypt) Nouran Gohar (United States) Amanda Sobhy (England) Sarah-Jane Perry

== Statistical information ==
The players/nations are sorted by:

1. Total number of titles;
2. Cumulated importance of those titles;
3. Alphabetical order (by family names for players).

=== Key ===
World Championship
World Tour Platinum
World Tour Gold
World Tour Silver
World Tour Bronze
Challenger Tour 5/10/20/30

=== Titles won by player (men's) ===
Total	Player	World Ch. / PSA Finals	Platinum	Gold	Silver	Bronze	Challenger 30	Challenger 20	Challenger 10	Challenger 5
4	Mohamed El Shorbagy (EGY)		●	●●●						
3	Vikram Malhotra (IND)							●	●●	
3	Nathan Lake (ENG)								●●●	
3	Moustafa El Sirty (EGY)									●●●
3	Ryosei Kobayashi (JPN)									●●●
3	Daniel Mekbib (CZE)									●●●
3	Jan Van Den Herrewegen (BEL)									●●●
2	Tarek Momen (EGY)	●			●					
2	Ali Farag (EGY)		●●							
2	Karim Abdel Gawad (EGY)		●	●						
2	Greg Lobban (SCO)						●	●		
2	Ivan Yuen (MYS)							●●		
2	Tayyab Aslam (PAK)							●	●	
2	Patrick Rooney (ENG)							●	●	
2	Leonel Cárdenas (MEX)								●●	
2	Victor Crouin (FRA)								●●	
2	Dimitri Steinmann (SUI)								●●	
2	Carlos Cornes (ESP)								●	●
2	Auguste Dussourd (FRA)								●	●
2	Shahjahan Khan (USA)								●	●
2	Angus Gillams (SCO)									●●
2	Rex Hedrick (AUS)									●●
1	Marwan El Shorbagy (EGY)	●								
1	Paul Coll (NZL)				●					
1	Diego Elías (PER)				●					
1	Campbell Grayson (NZL)						●			
1	Adrian Waller (ENG)						●			
1	Eain Yow (MYS)						●			
1	Harinder Pal Sandhu (IND)							●		
1	Alfredo Ávila (MEX)								●	
1	Christopher Binnie (JAM)								●	
1	Sébastien Bonmalais (FRA)								●	
1	Lyell Fuller (ENG)								●	
1	Youssef Ibrahim (EGY)								●	
1	Asim Khan (PAK)								●	
1	James Willstrop (ENG)								●	
1	Benjamin Aubert (FRA)									●
1	Balázs Farkas (HUN)									●
1	Darren Chan (MYS)									●
1	Shawn Delierre (CAN)									●
1	Ibrahim Elkabbani (EGY)									●
1	Yahya Elnawasany (EGY)									●
1	Tomotaka Endo (JPN)									●
1	Tom Ford (ENG)									●
1	Christopher Gordon (USA)									●
1	Wong Chi Him (HKG)									●
1	Tang Ming Hong (HKG)									●
1	Bernat Jaume (ESP)									●
1	Henry Leung (HKG)									●
1	Michael McCue (CAN)									●
1	Elliott Morris (WAL)									●
1	Aqeel Rehman (AUT)									●
1	Graeme Schnell (CAN)									●
1	Marwan Tarek (EGY)									●
1	Nick Wall (ENG)									●

=== Titles won by nation (men's) ===
Total	Nation	World Ch. / PSA Finals	Platinum	Gold	Silver	Bronze	Challenger 30	Challenger 20	Challenger 10	Challenger 5
18	Egypt (EGY)	●●	●●●●	●●●●	●				●	●●●●●●
9	England (ENG)						●	●	●●●●●●	●
6	France (FRA)								●●●●	●●
4	Malaysia (MYS)						●	●●		●
4	India (IND)							●●	●●	
4	Scotland (SCO)						●	●		●●
4	Japan (JPN)									●●●●
3	Pakistan (PAK)							●	●●	
3	Mexico (MEX)								●●●	
3	Spain (ESP)								●	●●
3	United States (USA)								●	●●
3	Belgium (BEL)									●●●
3	Canada (CAN)									●●●
3	Czech Republic (CZE)									●●●
3	Hong Kong (HKG)									●●●
2	New Zealand (NZL)				●		●			
2	Switzerland (SUI)								●●	
2	Australia (AUS)									●●
1	Peru (PER)				●					
1	Jamaica (JAM)								●	
1	Austria (AUT)									●
1	Hungary (HUN)									●
1	Wales (WAL)									●

=== Titles won by player (women's) ===
Total	Player	World Ch. / PSA Finals	Platinum	Gold	Silver	Bronze	Challenger 30	Challenger 20	Challenger 10	Challenger 5
4	Jana Shiha (EGY)								●	●●●
3	Danielle Letourneau (CAN)							●●	●	
3	Sabrina Sobhy (USA)							●	●●	
3	Aifa Azman (MYS)									●●●
2	Hania El Hammamy (EGY)	●	●							
2	Nour El Sherbini (EGY)	●	●							
2	Camille Serme (FRA)		●		●					
2	Nouran Gohar (EGY)		●			●				
2	Nour El Tayeb (EGY)			●		●				
2	Rachel Arnold (MYS)							●	●	
2	Menna Hamed (EGY)									●●
2	Jessica Turnbull (AUS)									●●
1	Raneem El Weleily (EGY)			●						
1	Amanda Sobhy (USA)					●				
1	Annie Au (HKG)						●			
1	Olivia Blatchford Clyne (USA)						●			
1	Mélissa Alves (FRA)							●		
1	Donna Lobban (AUS)							●		
1	Samantha Cornett (CAN)								●	
1	Olivia Fiechter (USA)								●	
1	Diana García (MEX)								●	
1	Hana Ramadan (EGY)								●	
1	Milou van der Heijden (NED)								●	
1	Amna Fayyaz (PAK)									●
1	Sana Ibrahim (EGY)									●
1	Reeham Sedky (USA)									●
1	Marina Stefanoni (USA)									●
1	Lily Taylor (ENG)									●
1	Nikki Todd (CAN)									●
1	Ho Tze-Lok (HKG)									●
1	Tong Tsz Wing (HKG)									●
1	Ooi Kah Yan (MYS)									●
1	Lee Ka Yi (HKG)									●

=== Titles won by nation (women's) ===
Total	Nation	World Ch. / PSA Finals	Platinum	Gold	Silver	Bronze	Challenger 30	Challenger 20	Challenger 10	Challenger 5
17	Egypt (EGY)	●●	●●●	●●		●●			●●	●●●●●●
8	United States (USA)					●	●	●	●●●	●●
6	Malaysia (MYS)							●	●	●●●●
5	Canada (CAN)							●●	●●	●
4	Hong Kong (HKG)						●			●●●
3	France (FRA)		●		●			●		
3	Australia (AUS)							●		●●
1	Mexico (MEX)								●	
1	Netherlands (NED)								●	
1	England (ENG)									●
1	Pakistan (PAK)									●

=== World Championship qualifiers ===
Winners of a select group of PSA Challenger Tour tournaments chosen by PSA receive a wildcard for the Men's and Women's World Championships. The qualified players were:

Player	Date	Tournament	Tier
Youssef Ibrahim (EGY)	10 August 2019	Growthpoint S.A. Open	PSA Challenger Tour 5
Menna Hamed (EGY)	10 August 2019	Growthpoint S.A. Open	PSA Challenger Tour 5
Aqeel Rehman (AUT)	10 August 2019	Russian Open	PSA Challenger Tour 5
Reeham Sedky (USA)	10 August 2019	Russian Open	PSA Challenger Tour 5
Ryosei Kobayashi (JPN)	25 August 2019	North Coast Open	PSA Challenger Tour 5
Aifa Azman (MYS)	25 August 2019	North Coast Open	PSA Challenger Tour 5
Sunayna Kuruvilla (IND)	27 August 2019	HCL SRFI Indian Tour – Delhi Leg	PSA Challenger Tour 5

== World and Continental championships ==
Event	Date	Venue	Men's		Women's					
Event	Date	Venue	champion	runner-up	champion	runner-up				
Pan American Games Individuals	July 25–27, 2019	CAR Videna; Lima; Peru	champion	runner-up	champion	runner-up	Diego Elías (PER); 11–6, 7–11, 12–10, 11–8	Miguel Ángel Rodríguez (COL)	Amanda Sobhy (USA); 7–11, 11–5, 11–7, 11–8	Olivia Blatchford Clyne (USA)
Pan American Games Individuals	July 28–31, 2019	CAR Videna; Lima; Peru	United States; 2–1	Colombia	United States; 2–0	Canada				
World Junior Individuals	July 30–August 3, 2019	National Squash Centre; Kuala Lumpur; Malaysia	Mostafa Asal (EGY); 12–10, 11–3, 11–6	Moustafa El Sirty (EGY)	Hania El Hammamy (EGY); 11–9, 11–6, 11–8	Jana Shiha (EGY)				
World Junior Women's Teams	August 5–9, 2019	National Squash Centre; Kuala Lumpur; Malaysia			Egypt; 2–0	Malaysia				
Caribbean Individuals	August 18–20, 2019	Georgetown Club; Georgetown; Guyana	Christopher Binnie (JAM); 11–8, 11–2, 11–5	Cameron Stafford (CAY)	Nicolette Fernandes (GUY); 11–2, 11–2, 11–5	Meagan Best (BAR)				
Caribbean Teams	August 21–24, 2019	Georgetown Club; Georgetown; Guyana	Guyana; 3–2	Jamaica	Guyana; 5–0 (Round-robin)	Barbados				
European Individuals	September 4–7, 2019	ParkLake Shopping Center; Bucharest; Romania	Raphael Kandra (GER); 11–6, 11–8, 7–11, 7–11, 12–10	Borja Golán (ESP)	Nele Gilis (BEL); 9–11, 11–9, 11–8, 13–11	Coline Aumard (FRA)				
European Clubs	September 18–21, 2019	Edinburgh Sports Club; Edinburgh; Scotland	Paderborner SC (GER); 3–1	Black & White Worms (GER)	Edgbaston Priory (ENG); 2–1	Pontefract (ENG)				
Balkan Individuals	September 27–29, 2019	Squashland Ljubljana; Ljubljana; Slovenia	Martin Kegel (CRO); 11–6, 13–11, 11–7	Martin Mošnik (SLO)	Sara Rojnik (SLO); 11–5, 11–9, 11–9	Paulina Radoš (CRO)				
World Women's Championship	October 24–November 1, 2019	Great Pyramid of Giza; Giza; Egypt			Nour El Sherbini (EGY); 11–4, 9–11, 11–5, 11–6	Raneem El Weleily (EGY)				
World Men's Championship	November 8–15, 2019	Khalifa Intl. Tennis & Squash Complex; Doha; Qatar	Tarek Momen (EGY); 11–8, 11–3, 11–4	Paul Coll (NZL)						
Southeast Asian Games Individuals	December 1–3, 2019	Manila Polo Club; Manila; Philippines	Addeen Idrakie (MYS); 11–7, 3–11, 11–9, 11–5	Robert Garcia (PHI)	Rachel Arnold (MYS); 11–9, 11–7, 11–3	Chan Yiwen (MYS)				
Southeast Asian Games Teams	December 7–9, 2019	Manila Polo Club; Manila; Philippines	Malaysia; 4–0 (Round-robin)	Philippines	Malaysia; 4–0 (Round-robin)	Singapore				
South Asian Games Individuals	December 6–8, 2019	International Sports Complex; Lalitpur; Nepal	Tayyab Aslam (PAK); 8–11, 11–3, 11–6, 11–8	Harinder Pal Sandhu (IND)	Tanvi Khanna (IND); 11–8, 9–11, 12–10, 11–5	Sunayna Kuruvilla (IND)				
South Asian Games Teams	December 8–10, 2019	International Sports Complex; Lalitpur; Nepal	Pakistan; 2–1	India	India; 2–1	Pakistan				
World Men's Teams	December 15–21, 2019	Squash on Fire; Washington, D.C. United States	Egypt; 2–0	England						
South American Youth (U19)	February 16–18, 2020	Club Rancho San Francisco; Quito; Ecuador	Andrés Villamizar (COL); 11–9, 8–11, 11–3, 11–7	Mateo Ávila (ECU)	María Paula Moya (ECU); 11–3, 11–3, 11–2	Valentina Portieri (ARG)				
Southeast Asian Individual	February 18–21, 2020	Vajiravudh College; Bangkok; Thailand	Duncan Lee (MYS); 11–4, 11–5, 11–4	Hafiz Zhafri (MYS)	Aira Azman (MYS); 13–15, 11–8, 11–3, 11–9	Heng Wai Wong (MYS)				
Southeast Asian Mixed Teams	February 22–23, 2020	Vajiravudh College; Bangkok; Thailand	Malaysia; 3–1		Philippines					
~~European U19 Individual~~	April 4–7, 2020	Squashtime; Eindhoven; Netherlands	Rescheduled first and cancelled later due to COVID-19.							
~~European U19 Teams~~	April 9–12, 2020	Squashtime; Eindhoven; Netherlands	Rescheduled first and cancelled later due to COVID-19.							
~~European Teams~~	April 29–May 2, 2020	Squashtime; Eindhoven; Netherlands	Rescheduled first and cancelled later due to COVID-19.							
~~European U15/U17 Teams~~	May 7–10, 2020	University of Nottingham Sport; Nottingham; England	Cancelled due to English Government restrictions about mass gatherings.							
~~World University Individuals~~	July 20–23, 2020	— Shanghai; China	Cancelled due to COVID-19 pandemic in China.							
~~World University Mixed Teams~~	July 24–26, 2020	— Shanghai; China	Cancelled due to COVID-19 pandemic in China.							
~~World Junior Individuals~~	July 19–24, 2020	— Gold Coast; Australia	Cancelled due to COVID-19 pandemic in Australia.							
~~World Junior Men's Teams~~	July 25–29, 2020	— Gold Coast; Australia	Cancelled due to COVID-19 pandemic in Australia.							

== National championships ==
These are the winners of the most relevant 2019–2020 national squash championships.

Country	Date	Venue	Men's champion	Women's champion
Argentina	December 6–8, 2019	Casal Squash Gym, Mar del Plata	Jorge Gutiérrez Keen	Pilar Etchechoury
Australia	February 7–9, 2020	Carrara Squash Centre, Carrara	Nicholas Calvert	Amelia Martin
Austria	February 7–9, 2020	Manhattan Fitness Nord, Vienna	Aqeel Rehman	Jacqueline Peychär
Belgium	February 13–16, 2020	Vlaams Squashcentrum, Herentals	Jan Van Den Herrewegen	Nele Gilis
Brazil	November 13–17, 2019	Capital Squash Center, Brasília	Guilherme Melo	Thaisa Serafini
Bulgaria	March 21–22, 2020	Sofia Squash Center, Sofia	Cancelled due to COVID-19 pandemic in Bulgaria	
Canada	May 5–10, 2020	The Club at White Oaks, Niagara-on-the-Lake	Moved to November 2020 due to COVID-19 pandemic in Canada	
Colombia	April 2–4, 2020	Unidad Deportiva El Salitre, Bogotá	Moved to autumn 2020 due to COVID-19 pandemic in Colombia	
Croatia	March 28–29, 2020	First Fitness & Squash Tower, Zagreb	Cancelled due to COVID-19 pandemic in Croatia	
Czech Republic	March 5–8, 2020	Sportovní centrum FAJNE, Ostrava	Daniel Mekbib	Anna Serme
Denmark	March 20–22, 2020	Kolding KFUM, Kolding	Moved to autumn 2020 due to COVID-19 pandemic in Denmark	
Egypt	February 13–16, 2020	Squash Stadium Complex, Cairo	Ali Farag	Raneem El Weleily
Estonia	February 8–9, 2020	Tondi Tennis Center, Tallinn	Kristjan Pettai	Aliis Allas
Finland	February 14–16, 2020	Tali Badminton & Squash Center, Helsinki	Olli Tuominen	Emilia Soini
France	February 10–13, 2020	SquashBad33, Bordeaux	Lucas Serme	Camille Serme
Germany	February 6–9, 2020	Sportwerk Hamburg, Hamburg	Raphael Kandra	Saskia Beinhard
Great Britain	February 11–16, 2020	David Ross Sports Village, Nottingham	James Willstrop	Sarah-Jane Perry
Greece	April 24–26, 2020	Athens Lawn Tennis Club, Athens	Cancelled due to COVID-19 pandemic in Greece	
Hong Kong	May, 2020	Hong Kong Football Club, Hong Kong	Cancelled due to COVID-19 pandemic in Hong Kong	
Hungary	May, 2020	Omega Sportcentrum, Százhalombatta	Moved to September 2020 due to COVID-19 pandemic in Hungary	
Iceland	March 25–27, 2020	Skvassfélag Reykjavíkur, Reykjavík	Cancelled due to COVID-19 pandemic in Iceland	
India	February 9–15, 2020	Indian Squash Academy, Chennai	Saurav Ghosal	Joshna Chinappa
Ireland	February 7–9, 2020	Fitzwilliam Lawn Tennis Club, Dublin	Arthur Gaskin	Sophie O'Rourke
Israel	Dec 29–Jan 3, 2020	Ra'anana Squash Center, Ra'anana	Ido Burstein	Nava Shor
Italy	May 22–24, 2020	Centro Tecnico Federale FIGS, Riccione	Moved to autumn 2020 due to COVID-19 pandemic in Italy	
Jamaica	November 27–30, 2019	The Liguanea Club, Kingston	Christopher Binnie	Savannah Thomson
Japan	November 14–17, 2019	Yokohama Squash Stadium (SQ‒CUBE), Yokohama	Ryosei Kobayashi	Satomi Watanabe
Latvia	November 9–10, 2019	Pepsi Centrs, Riga	Aleksandrs Pāvulāns	Baiba Lulle
Liechtenstein	November 23–24, 2019	Squash House, Vaduz	David Maier	Nicole Betchem
Lithuania	November 16–17, 2019	SEB Arena, Vilnius	Mantas Kočiūnas	Erika Rimšaitė
Luxembourg	Jan 31–Feb 1, 2020	CK SportCenter, Kockelscheuer	Mark Radley	Iulia Bucur
Macau	Nov 25–Dec 1, 2019	Bowling Centre, Macau	Liu Tsun Man	Leng Lam Leong
Malaysia	June 9–14, 2020	National Squash Centre, Bukit Jalil	Cancelled due to COVID-19 pandemic in Malaysia	
Netherlands	February 6–9, 2020	Frans Otten Stadion, Amsterdam	Piëdro Schweertman	Milou van der Heijden
New Zealand	October 29–Nov 1, 2020	National Squash Centre, Auckland	Evan Williams	Emma Millar
Norway	June 25–28, 2020	Hamar Stortorget, Hamar	Moved to October 2020 due to COVID-19 pandemic in Norway	
Poland	June 4–6, 2020	Hasta La Vista Sports Center, Wrocław	Filip Jarota	Karina Tyma
Portugal	July 4–5, 2020	–, Lisbon	Cancelled due to COVID-19 pandemic in Portugal	
Romania	February 14–16, 2020	Infinity Sport Arena, Bucharest	Radu Pena	Alexandra Bardac
Russia	February 21–24, 2020	National Squash Center, Moscow	Vladislav Titov	Varvara Esina
Scotland	March 13–15, 2020	Edinburgh Sports Club, Edinburgh	Alan Clyne	Lisa Aitken
Serbia	November 23–24, 2019	Belgrade Squash Club, Belgrade	Danilo Kulić	Jelena Dutina
Singapore	March 19–22, 2020	Kallang Squash Centre, Singapore	Cancelled due to COVID-19 pandemic in Singapore	
Slovakia	March 11–14, 2020	Bory Mall Shopping Center, Bratislava	Cancelled due to COVID-19 pandemic in Slovakia	
Slovenia	July 3–4, 2020	Squashland Ljubljana, Ljubljana	Martin Mošnik	Nina Kustec
South Africa	July 4–10, 2020	Pretoria Country Club, Pretoria	Moved to August 2020 due to COVID-19 pandemic in South Africa	
Spain	February 7–9, 2020	Tipi Park, Santa Cristina d'Aro	Iker Pajares	Cristina Gómez
Sweden	March 20–22, 2020	Enskede Rackethall, Stockholm	Christian Drakenberg	Moa Bönnemark
Switzerland	March 12–15, 2020	Zürich Squash, Langnau am Albis	Postponed due to COVID-19 pandemic in Switzerland	
Turkey	October 16–20, 2019	Süleyman Erol Swimming Pool, Antalya	Bahadır Fırat	Esma Kabakci
Ukraine	February 21–23, 2020	Sport Life Teremky, Kyiv	Valeriy Fedoruk	Anastasia Kostiukova
United States	April 3–5, 2020	Squash on Fire, Washington	Moved to late 2020/early 2021 due to COVID-19 pandemic in the United States	
Wales	June 12–14, 2020	Sport Wales National Centre, Cardiff	Moved to autumn 2020 due to COVID-19 pandemic in Wales	

== Retirements ==
Following is a list of notable players (winners of a main tour title, and/or part of the PSA Men's World Rankings and Women's World Rankings top 30 for at least one month) who announced their retirement from professional squash, became inactive, or were permanently banned from playing, during the 2019–20 season:

- (Hong Kong) Annie Au
- (Hong Kong) Leo Au
- (Hong Kong) Joey Chan
- (Canada) Samantha Cornett
- (Australia) Ryan Cuskelly
- (Egypt) Raneem El Weleily
- (England) Victoria Lust
- (Egypt) Omar Abdel Meguid
- (Australia) Cameron Pilley
- (England) Chris Simpson

== See also ==
- 2019–20 PSA World Tour Finals
- 2020 Men's PSA World Tour Finals
- 2020 Women's PSA World Tour Finals
