= Aditya Jagtap =

Indian squash player (born 1992)

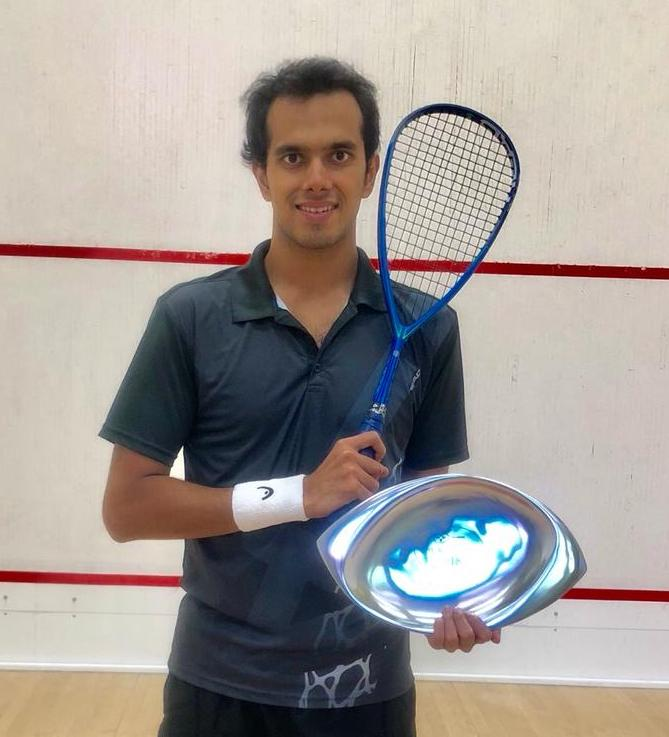

Personal information
- Born: 7 May 1992 (age 34) Ahmednagar, India
- Height: 180 cm (5 ft 11 in)
- Weight: 76 kg (168 lb)

Sport
- Country: India
- Turned pro: 2009
- Racquet used: Head

Men's singles
- Highest ranking: 61 (December 2021)
- Current ranking: 61 (December 2021)
- Updated on 01 December 2021

Aditya Jagtap (born 7 May 1992) is an Indian squash player. He is currently competing at the 2019-20 PSA World Tour. He achieved his career's highest world rankings of 61 in December 2021.

Jagtap graduated from Cornell University in 2015 while playing on the Big Red men's squash team.
