= 2019 Men's China Squash Open =

China Squash Open 2019
- 9th Men's China Open

Details
- Event name: 2019 J.P. Morgan China Squash Open
- Location: Shanghai, China
- Venue: The Peninsula Shanghai

Men's Winner
- Category: World Tour Gold
- Prize money: $112,000
- Year: World Tour 2019–20

The Men's China Squash Open 2019 was the men's edition of the 2019 China Squash Open, which is a tournament of the PSA World Tour World Tour Gold event (Prize money : 112 000 $). The event took place in Shanghai in China from 4 September to 8 September. Mohamed El Shorbagy won his second China Squash Open trophy, beating Ali Farag in the final.

== Prize money and ranking points ==
For 2016, the prize purse was $112,000. The prize money and points breakdown is as follows:

Prize Money China Open (2019)
Event	W	F	SF	QF	2R	1R
Points (PSA)	1750	1150	700	430	260	180

== Seeds ==
1. (Egypt) Ali Farag (final)
2. (Egypt) Mohamed El Shorbagy (champion)
3. (India) Saurav Ghosal (semifinals)
4. (Egypt) Marwan El Shorbagy (semifinals)
5. (Egypt) Omar Mosaad (quarterfinals)
6. (Mexico) Cesar Salazar (second round)
7. (England) Adrian Waller (second round)
8. (England) Tom Richards (quarterfinals)

== Draw and results ==
First round 4 September 2019
(Malaysia) Ivan Yuen	11	8	11	9	8
(Egypt) Youssef Soliman	8	11	7	11	11
(Egypt) Mostafa Asal	11	11	11
(China) Zhitao Zhou	3	4	4
(Malaysia) Eain Yow Ng	8	7	11	11
(Egypt) Mazen Hesham	11	11	5	13
(Hong Kong) Tsz Fung Yip	8	11	11	11
(Egypt) Mohamed ElSherbini	11	7	1	9
(Spain) Iker Pajares Bernabeu	11	11	1	11
(Scotland) Greg Lobban	9	6	11	6
(Qatar) Abdulla Mohd Al Tamimi	5
(Scotland) Alan Clyne	1
(France) Baptiste Masotti	11	8	11	8
(Hong Kong) Leo Au	13	11	6	11
(France) Lucas Serme	12	8	11	11
(Egypt) Karim Ali Fathi	10	11	4	2

Round of 16; 5 September 2019
1	(Egypt) Ali Farag	11	11	7	11
(Egypt) Youssef Soliman	5	4	11	4
(Egypt) Mostafa Asal	9	3	8
8	(England) Tom Richards	11	11	11
7	(England) Adrian Waller	11	9	9	5
(Egypt) Mazen Hesham	9	11	11	11
(Hong Kong) Tsz Fung Yip	7	4	7
3	(India) Saurav Ghosal	11	11	11
4	(Egypt) Marwan El Shorbagy	11	12	11	11
(Spain) Iker Pajares Bernabeu	4	14	9	4
(Qatar) Abdulla Mohd Al Tamimi	5	3	8
5	(Egypt) Omar Mosaad	11	11	11
6	(Mexico) Cesar Salazar	13	11	11	10	9
(Hong Kong) Leo Au	11	9	13	12	11
(France) Lucas Serme	11	11	7	4	2
2	(Egypt) Mohamed El Shorbagy	8	9	11	11	11

Quarter finals 6 September 2019
1	(Egypt) Ali Farag	14	6	11	9	11
8	(England) Tom Richards	12	11	4	11	5
(Egypt) Mazen Hesham	10	9	14	7
3	(India) Saurav Ghosal	12	11	12	11
4	(Egypt) Marwan El Shorbagy	11	13	15
5	(Egypt) Omar Mosaad	5	11	13
(Hong Kong) Leo Au	11	8	13	8
2	(Egypt) Mohamed El Shorbagy	3	11	15	11

Semi finals 7 September 2019
1	(Egypt) Ali Farag	11	11	11
3	(India) Saurav Ghosal	4	9	4
4	(Egypt) Marwan El Shorbagy	11	5	8	9
2	(Egypt) Mohamed El Shorbagy	8	11	11	11

Final; 8 September 2019
1	(Egypt) Ali Farag	3	9	11	8
2	(Egypt) Mohamed El Shorbagy	11	11	5	11

== See also ==
- 2019–20 PSA World Tour
- China Squash Open
