= Abdalah El Masry =

Egyptian squash player (born 1999)

Personal information
- Born: 16 June 1999 (age 27) Cairo

Sport
- Turned pro: 2018
- Highest ranking: 110 (November 2022)
- Current ranking: 110 (November 2022)
- Updated on 28 November 2022

Abdalah El Masry, also known as Abdallah Elmasry and Abdallah Yaser (born 16 June 1999) is an Egyptian professional squash player who plays for Egypt men's national squash team. He achieved his highest career PSA singles ranking of World No. 224 in March 2020 during the 2019-20 PSA World Tour.
