= Hazem Helmy =

Egyptian squash player (born 2000)

Personal information
- Born: 26 July 2000 (age 26) Cairo

Sport
- Highest ranking: 190 (March 2020)
- Current ranking: 190 (March 2020)
- Updated on March 2020

Hazem Helmy (born 26 July 2000) is an Egyptian professional squash player who plays for Egypt men's national squash team. He achieved his career-high PSA singles ranking of 190 in March 2020 during the 2019-20 PSA World Tour.
