= Katriona Allen =

Scottish squash player (born 1997)

Personal information
- Born: 13 October 1997 (age 28) Enfield, England

Sport
- Handedness: left-handed
- Turned pro: 2018
- Coached by: Paul Bell
- Racquet used: Eye
- Highest ranking: 107 (April 2020)
- Current ranking: 107 (April 2020)
- Updated on April 2020

Katriona Allen (born 13 October 1997) is an English-born Scottish professional squash player who currently plays for the Scotland women's national squash team. She achieved her highest career PSA singles ranking of 107 in April 2020 as a part of the 2019-20 PSA World Tour.
