= Moustafa El Sirty =

Egyptian squash player (born 2001)

Personal information
- Born: 25 October 2001 (age 24) Cairo, Egypt
- Height: 191

Sport
- Country: Egypt
- Turned pro: 2018
- Retired: Active
- Racquet used: UNSQUASHABLE

Men's singles
- Highest ranking: No.22 (March 2023)
- Current ranking: No. 50 (14 July 2025)
- Title: 12
- Tour final: 17

Moustafa El Sirty (Egyptian Arabic: مصطفى السرتى, born 25 October 2001) is an Egyptian professional squash player. He reached a career high ranking of 22 in the world during March 2023.

== Career ==
He won the 2019 CIB El Shams Tour 1 tournament.

In 2024, El Sirty won his 18th PSA title after securing victory in the Abu Dhabi Racket Club Open during the 2024–25 PSA Squash Tour.
