= Daniel Mekbib =

Czech squash player (born 1992)

Personal information
- Born: 4 July 1992 (age 34) Bruntál, Czechoslovakia

Sport
- Country: Czech Republic
- Handedness: Left Handed
- Retired: Active
- Racquet used: Eye
- Highest ranking: No. 103 (December 2017)
- Current ranking: No. 117 (February 2018)
- Updated on February, 2018

Daniel Mekbib (born 4 July 1992 in Bruntál) is a Czech professional squash player. As of February 2018, he was ranked number 117 in the world. He is in the Czech Republic men's national squash team.

Mekbib's father is Ethiopian.
