= Tom Ford (squash player) =

English squash player (born 1993)

Personal information
- Born: 11 November 1993 (age 32) Worcester, England
- Height: 1.80 m (5 ft 11 in)
- Weight: 66 kg (146 lb)

Sport
- Country: England
- Handedness: Left Handed
- Turned pro: 2007
- Coached by: Hadrian Stiff, Fiona Geaves
- Retired: Active
- Racquet used: Dunlop

Men's singles
- Highest ranking: No. 60 (December 2015)
- Current ranking: No. 60 (January 2016)
- Updated on January 2016

Tom Ford (born 11 November 1993 in Worcester) is a professional squash player who represents England. He is a left-handed player who turned professional in 2012. He reached a career-high world ranking of World No. 60 in December 2015.
