= Menna Hamed =

Egyptian squash player (born 1998)

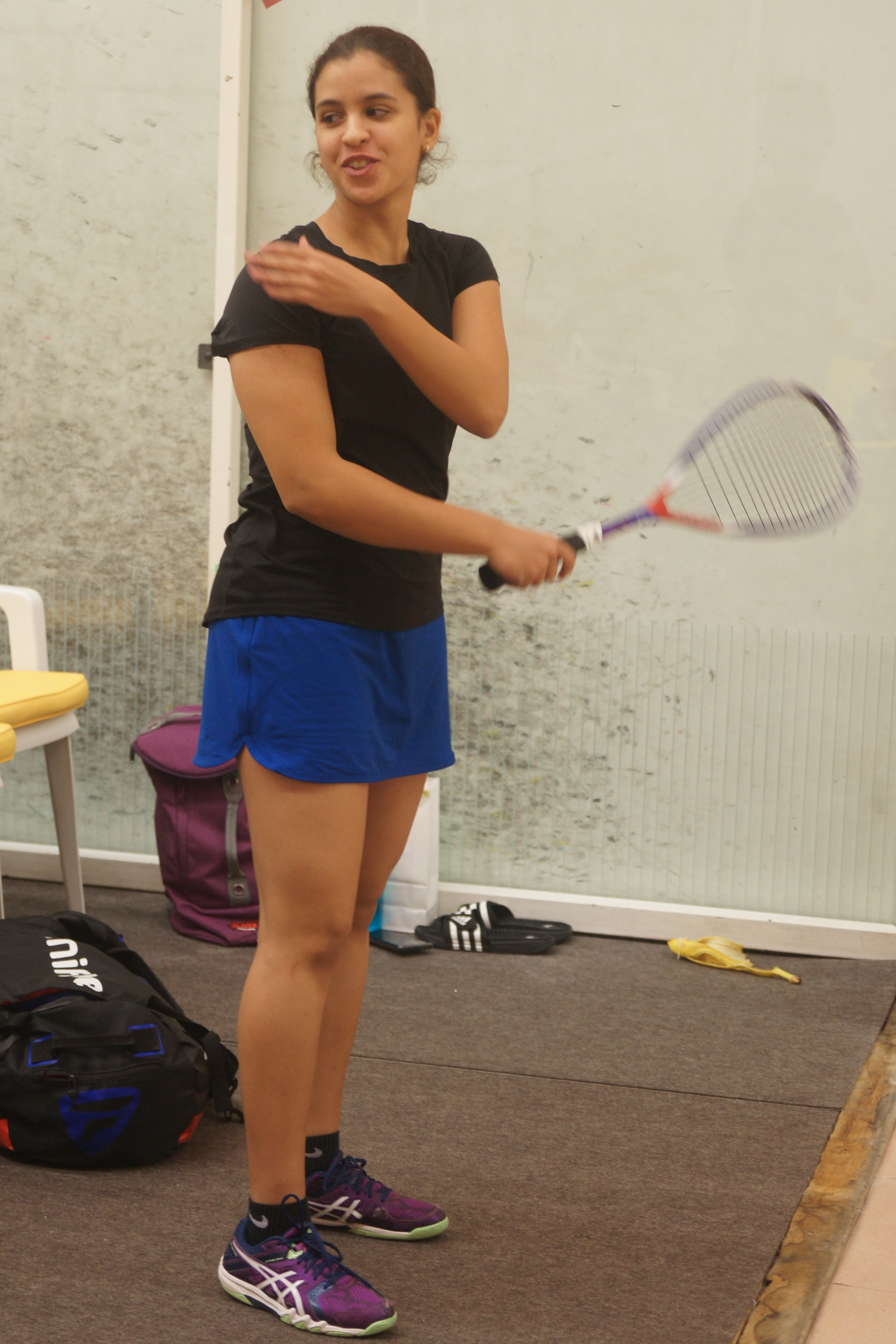
- Menna Hamed, Monte Carlo Squash Classic 2018

Personal information
- Born: January 30, 1998 (age 28) Cairo, Egypt

Sport
- Country: Egypt
- Retired: Active

Women's singles
- Highest ranking: No. 32 (3 March 2025)
- Current ranking: No. 42 (14 July 2025)
- Updated on September 2024

Menna Hamed (born 30 January 1998 in Cairo) is an Egyptian professional squash player. As of September 2024, she was ranked number 46 in the world.
