= Elena Wagenmans =

Dutch squash player

Personal information
- Born: 9 September 2000 (age 25) Belgium, Brussels
- Height: 6 ft 0 in (1.83 m)

Sport
- Country: Netherlands
- Handedness: Right Handed
- Retired: Active
- Racquet used: Tecnifibre

Women's singles
- Highest ranking: No. 147 (January 2017)
- Current ranking: No. 147 (January 2017)
- Updated on 1 January 2017

Elena Wagenmans (born 9 September 2000 in Brussels) is a squash player best known for representing the senior national team of the Netherlands since the age of 13. At the age of 17, she enrolled in the Stanford University class of 2022.

== Career ==
Wagenmans reached a career-high world ranking of World No. 147 in January 2017. She won the US Junior Squash Open Under-11 category in 2009 and 2010, the Dutch Junior Open Under-13 in 2013, and the Dutch National Junior Title Under-19 in 2014. In 2015, she won the Pioneer Under-15 and the Portuguese Open Under-19. A year later, she notched four notable 3-0 wins against top 100 players.

=== National team ===
Wagenmans started playing on the Netherlands women's national squash team in 2014 at age 13, the same year she won the national junior title under 19. Wagenmans was part of the victorious Dutch Women's national team that won the gold medal at the 2015 European Squash Championships in the second division, her second selection at senior level.

=== Stanford ===
Wagenmans is enrolled in Stanford University, attracted by its engineering program. She plays No. 1 on the Stanford squash team and provided the clinching point in Stanford's victory over Princeton in the CSA National Championships' historical third-place match in 2019. She was named to the First Team All-America selection, a first in the university's history.

Prior to Stanford, Wagenmans attended Lakeside School, the high school in Seattle, in the United States where Bill Gates and Paul Allen met.
