= Michael McCue =

Canadian squash player (born 1993)

Personal information
- Born: March 19, 1993 (age 33) Sudbury, Ontario, Canada

Sport
- Country: Canada
- Handedness: Right Handed
- Turned pro: 2010
- Retired: Active
- Racquet used: Harrow
- Highest ranking: No. 81 (March 2018)
- Current ranking: No. 93 (June 2018)
- Title: 1
- Tour final: 5
- Updated on 4 June 2018

Michael McCue (born March 19, 1993) is a Canadian professional squash player. As of June 2018, he was ranked number 93 in the world. He won his first world tour title at the 2018 Mount Royal University Open PSA5 tournament.
