= Guilherme Melo (squash player) =

Brazilian squash player (born 1991)

Personal information
- Born: September 10, 1991 (age 34) São Paulo, Brazil

Sport
- Country: Brazil
- Turned pro: 2017
- Coached by: Julio Caseiro
- Retired: Active
- Racquet used: Dunlop

Men's singles
- Highest ranking: No. 104 (November 2022)
- Current ranking: No. 212 (January 2025)

Guilherme Melo (born 10 September 1991) is a Brazilian professional squash player and has represented the Brazilian National Squash Team. He reached a career high ranking of 104 in the world during October 2022.

== Career ==
Melo is a two-time Professional Brazilian Champion, titles that he won in 2019 and 2020 (the latter one being played in June 2021) beating in the final Rafael Alarcon and Diego Gobbi, respectively. He later won the 2021 PAC Squash Open.

Melo won a gold medal in the South American championship in 2022 for the Men's Team Event as well as a silver medal in the individual event. Guilherme's coach is Julio Caseiro who is a former professional player based in São Paulo.
