= 2021–22 PSA World Tour =

Details
- Event name: PSA World Tour 2021–22
- Dates: August 2021 – July 2022
- Categories: World Championship: Men's/Women's; World Tour Finals: Men's/Women's; PSA Challenger Tour; WSF & PSA Satellite Tour
- Website; PSA World Tour

Achievements
- World Number 1: Men : (Egypt) Ali Farag; Women : (Egypt) Nouran Gohar
- World Champion: Men: (Egypt) Ali Farag; Women: (Egypt) Nour El Sherbini

The 2021–22 PSA World Tour is the international squash tour organised circuit organized by the Professional Squash Association (PSA) for the 2021–22 squash season. It's the 7th PSA season since the merger of PSA and WSA associations in 2015.

The most important tournaments in the series are the PSA World Championship for Men's and Women's. The tour also features two circuits of regular events—PSA World Tour (formerly PSA World Series), which feature the highest prize money and the best fields; and PSA Challenger Tour with prize money ranging $5,500–$30,000. In the middle of the year (usually in June), the PSA World Tour tour is concluded by the Men's and Women's PSA World Tour Finals in Cairo, the season-ending championships for the top 8 rated players from World Tour level tournaments.

== Overview ==
=== PSA World Tour changes ===
Starting in August 2018, PSA revamped its professional tour structure in two individual circuits; PSA World Tour and PSA Challenger Tour.

PSA World Tour (formerly PSA World Series) will comprise most important tournaments in prize money for more experienced and higher-ranked players, including PSA World Championships and PSA World Tour Finals, labelled as following:

- PSA World Tour Platinum — 48-player draws — $165,000
- PSA World Tour Gold — 24-player draws — $97,500–$100,000
- PSA World Tour Silver — 24-player draws — $67,500–$70,000
- PSA World Tour Bronze — 24-player draws — $45,000–$47,500

PSA Challenger Tour tournaments will offer a $6,000–$30,000 prize-money, ideal circuit for less-experienced and upcoming players, that will include the following tiers:

- PSA Challenger Tour 30 — $30,000
- PSA Challenger Tour 20 — $20,000
- PSA Challenger Tour 10 — $12,000
- PSA Challenger Tour 5 — $6,000
- PSA Challenger Tour 3 — $3,000 (starting August 2020)

=== Prize money/ranking points breakdown ===
PSA World Tour events also have a separate World Tour ranking. Points for this are calculated on a cumulative basis after each World Tour event. The top eight players at the end of the calendar year are then eligible to play in the PSA World Tour Finals.

Ranking points vary according to tournament tier being awarded as follows:

PSA World Tour			Ranking Points						
Rank	Prize money US$	Ranking Points	Winner	Runner up	3/4	5/8	9/16	17/32	33/48
Platinum	$165,000	19188 points	2750	1810	1100	675	410	250	152.5
Gold	$97,500–$100,000	10660 points	1750	1150	700	430	260	160	
Silver	$67,500–$70,000	7470 points	1225	805	490	300	182.5	112.5	
Bronze	$47,500–$50,000	5330 points	875	575	350	215	130	80	
PSA World Tour Finals			Ranking Points						
Rank	Prize money US$	Winner	Runner up	3/4	Round-Robin Match Win	Undefeated bonus			
World Tour Finals	$185,000	1000	550	200	150	150			
PSA Challenger Tour			Ranking Points						
Rank	Prize money US$	Ranking Points	Winner	Runner up	3/4	5/8	9/16	17/32	33/48
Challenger Tour 30	$30,000	3194 points	525	345	210	130	78	47.5	
Challenger Tour 20	$20,000	2112 points	350	230	140	85	51	31.5	
Challenger Tour 10	$12,000	1218 points	200	130	80	50	30	18	
Challenger Tour 5	$6,000	609 points	100	65	40	25	15	9	
PSA World Championships			Ranking Points						
Rank	Prize money US$	Ranking Points	Winner	Runner up	3/4	5/8	9/16	17/32	33/64
PSA World Championships	$500,000	25045 points	3175	2090	1270	780	475	290	177.5

== Calendar ==
=== Key ===
PSA Tiers
World Championship
World Tour Platinum
World Tour Gold
World Tour Silver
World Tour Bronze
Challenger Tour 3/5/10/20/30

=== August ===
Tournament	Date	Champion	Runner-Up	Semifinalists	Quarterfinalists
Hit and Run Challenger; Brighton, England; Men : Challenger 5; 16 players – $3,000 −−−−−− Women : Challenger 5; 16 players – $3,000	3–6 August	(Portugal) Rui Soares; 11–9, 2–11, 11–8, 11–3 (3rd PSA title)	(England) Curtis Malik	(England) Perry Malik (England) Mike Harris	(England) Lewis Anderson (England) James Peach (Brazil) Vini Rodrigues (England) Tom Walsh
Hit and Run Challenger; Brighton, England; Men : Challenger 5; 16 players – $3,000 −−−−−− Women : Challenger 5; 16 players – $3,000	3–6 August	(Scotland) Georgia Adderley; 11–3, 10–12, 9–11, 12–10, 6–11 (2nd PSA title)	(England) Lucy Beecroft	(Scotland) Alison Thomson (England) Torrie Malik	(England) Kace Bartley (England) Katie Wells (England) Grace Gear (Finland) Emilia Korhonen
Global Pontefract Men's Challenger; Pontefract, England; Men : Challenger 5; 16 players – $3,000	6–8 August	(England) Sam Todd; 11–9, 11–6, 11–2 (1st PSA title)	(Scotland) Rory Stewart	(Republic of Ireland) Sean Conroy (Scotland) Fergus Richards	(England) Harry Falconer (Wales) Emyr Evans (England) Miles Jenkins (England) Ben Smith
PSA Moscow Tour #2; Moscow, Russia; Men : Challenger 3; 16 players – $1,500	7–8 August	(Russia) Vladislav Titov; 18–16, 13–11, 11–8 (3rd PSA title)	(Ukraine) Valeriy Fedoruk	(Russia) Makar Esin (Russia) Petr Smekhov	(Russia) Aleksandr Sadchikov (Russia) Pavel Tishchenko (Russia) Igor Sivkov (Russia) Mikhail Skurikhin
Manchester Open; Manchester, England; Men : World Tour Silver; 24 players – $85,000 −−−−−− Women : World Tour Silver; 24 players – $85,000	9–13 August	(Peru) Diego Elías; 12–10, 11–6, 11–6 (8th PSA title)	(Wales) Joel Makin	(Egypt) Youssef Ibrahim (Egypt) Marwan El Shorbagy	(Egypt) Mazen Hesham (Qatar) Abdulla Al-Tamimi (Egypt) Omar Mosaad (Egypt) Mohamed Abouelghar
Manchester Open; Manchester, England; Men : World Tour Silver; 24 players – $85,000 −−−−−− Women : World Tour Silver; 24 players – $85,000	9–13 August	(Egypt) Hania El Hammamy; 11–5, 11–9, 11–7 (7th PSA title)	(England) Sarah-Jane Perry	(Wales) Tesni Evans (Wales) Emily Whitlock	(Belgium) Nele Gilis (Malaysia) Sivasangari Subramaniam (France) Coline Aumard (Belgium) Tinne Gilis
Cheam Squash Squared Classic; Cheam, England; Men : Challenger 3; 16 players – $1,500	14–15 August	(England) Simon Herbert; 8–11, 11–6, 11–6, 3–11, 11–8 (1st PSA title)	(England) Stuart MacGregor	(Wales) Peter Creed (South Africa) Gareth Naidoo	(England) Ben Smith (England) Tom Walsh (England) Aaron Allpress (England) Perry Malik
Torneo Profesional Mexicano de Squash; Mexico City, Mexico; Men : Challenger 5; 32 players – $3,000	12–16 August	(Mexico) Alfredo Ávila; 11–3, 11–9, 11–9 (13th PSA title)	(Canada) David Baillargeon	(Mexico) Jorge Gómez (Brazil) Diego Gobbi	(Guatemala) Josué Enríquez (Brazil) Guilherme Melo (Mexico) Miled Zarazúa (Mexico) Alejandro Reyes
CIB Egyptian Challenger Tour #2; Cairo, Egypt; Men : Challenger 5; 32 players – $3,000 −−−−−− Women : Challenger 5; 32 players – $3,000	14–18 August	(Egypt) Moustafa El Sirty; 11–6, 11–8, 11–5 (6th PSA title)	(Egypt) Yassin El Shafei	(Egypt) Ibrahim Elkabbani (Iraq) Mohamed Hassan	(Egypt) Abdalah El Masry (Egypt) Yahya Elnawasany (Egypt) Seif Shenawy (Egypt) Aly Abou Eleinen
CIB Egyptian Challenger Tour #2; Cairo, Egypt; Men : Challenger 5; 32 players – $3,000 −−−−−− Women : Challenger 5; 32 players – $3,000	14–18 August	(Egypt) Nour Aboulmakarim; 9–11, 11–8, 11–7, 11–5 (1st PSA title)	(Egypt) Kenzy Ayman	(Egypt) Nardine Garas (Egypt) Salma El Tayeb	(Egypt) Nour Heikal (Egypt) Nour Megahed (Egypt) Haya Ali (Egypt) Lojayn Gohary
Scottish Circuit Event #1; Edinburgh, Scotland; Men : Challenger 5; 16 players – $3,000	16–18 August	(Scotland) Rory Stewart; 11–8, 11–8, 11–9 (4th PSA title)	(Scotland) Fergus Richards	(Scotland) Chris Leiper (Scotland) Jamie Henderson	(Scotland) Alasdair Prott (Scotland) Martin Ross (Scotland) James Singh (Scotland) Kyle Penman
Colombian Open; Bogotá, Colombia; Men : Challenger 10; 24 players – $6,000	17–21 August	(Canada) David Baillargeon; 11–7, 10–12, 11–6, 11–5 (2nd PSA title)	(United States) Christopher Gordon	(Colombia) Ronald Palomino (Brazil) Guilherme Melo	(Colombia) Edgar Ramírez (Brazil) Diego Gobbi (Mexico) Miled Zarazúa (Colombia) Andrés Herrera
Allam British Open; Hull, England; Men : World Tour Platinum; 48 players – $175,000 – Draw −−−−−− Women : World Tour Platinum; 48 players – $175,000 – Draw	16–22 August	(New Zealand) Paul Coll; 6–11, 11–6, 11–6, 11–8 (15th PSA title)	(Egypt) Ali Farag	(Egypt) Mohamed El Shorbagy (Colombia) Miguel Ángel Rodríguez	(Egypt) Marwan El Shorbagy (Egypt) Youssef Soliman (Egypt) Mostafa Asal (Peru) Diego Elías
Allam British Open; Hull, England; Men : World Tour Platinum; 48 players – $175,000 – Draw −−−−−− Women : World Tour Platinum; 48 players – $175,000 – Draw	16–22 August	(Egypt) Nour El Sherbini; 9–11, 13–11, 5–11, 11–7, 11–2 (26th PSA title)	(Egypt) Nouran Gohar	(United States) Amanda Sobhy (Egypt) Hania El Hammamy	(New Zealand) Joelle King (England) Sarah-Jane Perry (Egypt) Nadine Shahin (Egypt) Rowan Elaraby
Elan Vital Open; Mönchengladbach, Germany; Men : Challenger 5; 16 players – $3,000	20–22 August	(France) Sébastien Bonmalais; 11–3, 11–3, 11–6 (5th PSA title)	(Germany) Yannik Omlor	(Switzerland) Cédric Kuchen (Czech Republic) David Zeman	(Liechtenstein) David Maier (France) Toufik Mekhalfi (Czech Republic) Marek Panáček (Austria) Jakob Dirnberger
AS Insurance Services NM Academy Open; Sheffield, England; Men : Challenger 3; 16 players – $1,500 −−−−−− Women : Challenger 5; 16 players – $3,000	20–22 August	(England) Stuart MacGregor; 11–9, 11–6, 6–11, 11–6 (1st PSA title)	(England) Nick Wall	(England) Jack Mitterer (England) Harry Falconer	(Scotland) Martin Ross (England) Simon Herbert (England) Aaron Allpress (England) Carlton Oldham
AS Insurance Services NM Academy Open; Sheffield, England; Men : Challenger 3; 16 players – $1,500 −−−−−− Women : Challenger 5; 16 players – $3,000	20–22 August	(Scotland) Georgia Adderley; 13–11, 11–5, 11–9 (3rd PSA title)	(Scotland) Alison Thomson	(England) Alicia Mead (England) Grace Gear	(England) Lucy Beecroft (England) Torrie Malik (Scotland) Katriona Allen (England) Kace Bartley
Squash Eredivisie – Speelronde 6 Amsterdam, Netherlands; Men : Challenger 3; 16 players – $1,500 −−−−−− Women : Challenger 3; 16 players – $1,500	20–22 August	(Czech Republic) Martin Švec; 10–12, 4–11, 11–7, 11–5, 11–6 (2nd PSA title)	(Netherlands) Roshan Bharos	(Belgium) Joeri Hapers (Germany) Julius Benthin	(Zimbabwe) Blessing Muhwati (Netherlands) Marc ter Sluis (Spain) Arón Astray (Czech Republic) Ondřej Vorlíček
Squash Eredivisie – Speelronde 6 Amsterdam, Netherlands; Men : Challenger 3; 16 players – $1,500 −−−−−− Women : Challenger 3; 16 players – $1,500	20–22 August	(Hungary) Hannah Chukwu; 9–11, 11–8, 12–10, 11–5 (2nd PSA title)	(Spain) Marta Domínguez	(Netherlands) Milou van der Heijden (Germany) Katerina Týcová	(Netherlands) Tessa ter Sluis (Germany) Saskia Beinhard (Austria) Jacqueline Peychär (France) Léa Barbeau
Tournoi National Féminin Les Ombrelles; Antibes, France; Women : WSF & PSA Satellite; 32 players – $2,700	21–22 August	(Denmark) Klara Møller; 11–5, 8–11, 15–17, 11–7, 11–5	(France) Kara Lincou	(France) Ana Munos (France) Mahé Asensi	(France) Ella Gálová (France) Amandine Goblet (France) Lilou Brévard-Belliot (France) Anne-Cécile Armand
2º HCL SRFI Indian Tour – Chennai; Chennai, India; Men : Challenger 10; 24 players – $6,000 −−−−−− Women : Challenger 10; 24 players – $6,000	23–26 August	(India) Velavan Senthilkumar; 11–7, 11–8, 11–5 (2nd PSA title)	(India) Abhishek Pradhan	(India) Abhishek Agarwal (India) Rahul Baitha	(India) Abhay Singh (India) Kanhav Nanavati (India) Aadit Zaveri (India) Harinder Pal Sandhu
2º HCL SRFI Indian Tour – Chennai; Chennai, India; Men : Challenger 10; 24 players – $6,000 −−−−−− Women : Challenger 10; 24 players – $6,000	23–26 August	(India) Tanvi Khanna; 11–5, 9–11, 7–11, 11–7, 15–13 (1st PSA title)	(India) Sunayna Kuruvilla	(India) Akshaya Sri (India) Aparajitha Balamurukan	(India) Urwashi Joshi (India) Abhisheka Shannon (India) Sachika Balvani (India) Janet Vidhi
TWC Squash Squared Open; London, England; Men : Challenger 10; 24 players – $6,000 −−−−−− Women : Challenger 10; 24 players – $6,000	22–27 August	(England) Richie Fallows; 11–7, 7–11, 11–6, 11–5 (9th PSA title)	(Portugal) Rui Soares	(Scotland) Rory Stewart (England) Joshua Masters	(England) Tom Walsh (England) Ben Smith (England) Miles Jenkins (Wales) Emyr Evans
TWC Squash Squared Open; London, England; Men : Challenger 10; 24 players – $6,000 −−−−−− Women : Challenger 10; 24 players – $6,000	22–27 August	(England) Georgina Kennedy; 11–4, 11–3, 11–6 (6th PSA title)	(Scotland) Alison Thomson	(England) Grace Gear (Scotland) Georgia Adderley	(England) Elise Lazarus (England) Alicia Mead (England) Lucy Beecroft (Wales) Ali Loke
CIB Egyptian Challenger Tour #3; Cairo, Egypt; Men : Challenger 5; 32 players – $3,000 −−−−−− Women : Challenger 5; 32 players – $3,000	23–27 August	(Egypt) Yahya Elnawasany; 11–7, 8–11, 8–11, 16–14, 11–8 (3rd PSA title)	(Egypt) Moustafa El Sirty	(Egypt) Omar Elkattan (Iraq) Mohamed Hassan	(Egypt) Abdalah El Masry (Egypt) Ziad Ibrahim (Egypt) Mohamed Nasser (Egypt) Seif Shenawy
CIB Egyptian Challenger Tour #3; Cairo, Egypt; Men : Challenger 5; 32 players – $3,000 −−−−−− Women : Challenger 5; 32 players – $3,000	23–27 August	(Egypt) Nour Heikal; 6–11, 13–11, 11–8, 12–10 (1st PSA title)	(Egypt) Kenzy Ayman	(Egypt) Malak Khafagy (Egypt) Salma El Tayeb	(Egypt) Nada Ehab (Egypt) Zeina Zein (Egypt) Malak Fathy (Egypt) Haya Ali
Schräglage Squash Open; Böblingen, Germany; Men : Challenger 5; 32 players – $3,000 −−−−−− Women : Challenger 3; 16 players – $1,500	27–29 August	(England) Robert Downer; 9–11, 11–9, 15–17, 11–6, 11–5 (2nd PSA title)	(Germany) Valentin Rapp	(Switzerland) Robin Gadola (Czech Republic) Martin Švec	(Netherlands) Roshan Bharos (Switzerland) Yannick Wilhelmi (Belgium) Joeri Hapers (Germany) Yannik Omlor
Schräglage Squash Open; Böblingen, Germany; Men : Challenger 5; 32 players – $3,000 −−−−−− Women : Challenger 3; 16 players – $1,500	27–29 August	(Spain) Marta Domínguez; 9–11, 12–10, 11–9, 12–10 (1st PSA title)	(Switzerland) Ambre Allinckx	(Switzerland) Nadia Pfister (Austria) Jacqueline Peychär	(France) Taba Taghavi (Germany) Katerina Týcová (Germany) Aylin Günsav (Switzerland) Stella Kaufmann
COMBAXX Sports Squash Championship; Islamabad, Pakistan; Men : Challenger 10; 32 players – $6,000	27–31 August	(Pakistan) Nasir Iqbal; 8–11, 10–12, 11–8, 11–5, 11–4 (12th PSA title)	(Pakistan) Tayyab Aslam	(Pakistan) Israr Ahmed (Pakistan) Hamza Sharif	(Pakistan) Amaad Fareed (Pakistan) Asim Khan (Pakistan) Farhan Mehboob (Pakistan) Farhan Zaman
Quebec Open; Montreal, Canada; Men : Challenger 5; 24 players – $3,000	29 Aug. – 2 Sep.	(Canada) David Baillargeon; 11–7, 11–5, 11–5 (3rd PSA title)	(Canada) Nick Sachvie	(Canada) Shawn Delierre (Canada) Michael McCue	(Canada) Eric Dingle (Canada) Asser Ibrahim (Canada) Graeme Schnell (Canada) Cameron Seth

=== September ===
Tournament	Date	Champion	Runner-Up	Semifinalists	Quarterfinalists
I PSA RFESquash; O Milladoiro, Spain; Men : WSF & PSA Satellite; 32 players – $5,955	3–5 September	(Spain) Iker Pajares; 11–5, 11–9, 5–11, 11–7	(Spain) Borja Golán	(Spain) Iván Pérez (Spain) Hugo Varela	(Spain) Javier Martín (Spain) Augusto Ortigosa (Spain) Pascal Gómez (Spain) Nilo Vidal
PSA Moscow Tour #3; Moscow, Russia; Men : Challenger 3; 16 players – $1,500	4–5 September	(Ukraine) Valeriy Fedoruk; 11–4, 8–11, 11–6, 11–5 (1st PSA title)	(Russia) Makar Esin	(Russia) Vladislav Titov (Russia) Petr Smekhov	(Russia) Mikhail Skurikhin (Russia) Igor Sivkov (Russia) Aleksandr Sadchikov (Russia) Alexander Beloborodov
HCL SRFI Indian Tour – Noida; Noida, India; Men : Challenger 5; 24 players – $3,000 −−−−−− Women : Challenger 10; 24 players – $6,000	4–7 September	(India) Velavan Senthilkumar; 11–7, 11–6, 11–9 (3rd PSA title)	(India) Abhishek Pradhan	(India) Abhishek Agarwal (India) Rahul Baitha	(India) Aadit Zaveri (India) Jaideep Sethi (India) Sandeep Ramachandran (India) Navaneeth Prabhu
HCL SRFI Indian Tour – Noida; Noida, India; Men : Challenger 5; 24 players – $3,000 −−−−−− Women : Challenger 10; 24 players – $6,000	4–7 September	(India) Tanvi Khanna; 11–7, 11–6, 11–9 (2nd PSA title)	(India) Sunayna Kuruvilla	(India) Urwashi Joshi (India) Anjali Semwal	(India) Tiana Parasrampuria (India) Abhisheka Shannon (India) Anahat Singh (India) Akshaya Sri
South State Bank Marietta Open; Marietta, United States; Men : Challenger 20; 24 players – $22,500	8–12 September	(France) Victor Crouin; 11–5, 11–6, 11–1 (14th PSA title)	(Egypt) Aly Abou Eleinen	(Scotland) Alan Clyne (England) Nathan Lake	(Canada) David Baillargeon (Malaysia) Addeen Idrakie (Czech Republic) Daniel Mekbib (United States) Spencer Lovejoy
Madeira International; Caniço, Portugal; Men : Challenger 10; 24 players – $12,000	8–12 September	(Egypt) Moustafa El Sirty; 7–11, 11–2, 11–5, 11–6 (7th PSA title)	(Portugal) Rui Soares	(India) Mahesh Mangaonkar (Spain) Iván Pérez	(Wales) Emyr Evans (England) Joshua Masters (England) Robert Downer (England) Sam Todd
GWC Squash House Challenger 5 Cos Cob, United States; Women : Challenger 5; 16 players – $6,000	10–12 September	(Malaysia) Wen Li Lai; 11–9, 11–8, 12–10 (2nd PSA title)	(France) Marie Stephan	(Mexico) Diana García (Poland) Karina Tyma	(Ukraine) Alina Bushma (England) Alicia Mead (England) Lucy Beecroft (United States) Lucie Stefanoni
CIB Egyptian Open; Cairo, Egypt; Men : World Tour Platinum; 48 players – $295,000 – Draw −−−−−− Women : World Tour Platinum; 48 players – $295,000 – Draw	10–17 September	(Egypt) Ali Farag; 6–11, 9–11, 11–2, 11–6, 11–5 (23rd PSA title)	(Egypt) Mohamed El Shorbagy	(New Zealand) Paul Coll (Egypt) Tarek Momen	(Egypt) Zahed Salem (Egypt) Mazen Hesham (Egypt) Marwan El Shorbagy (Malaysia) Eain Yow
CIB Egyptian Open; Cairo, Egypt; Men : World Tour Platinum; 48 players – $295,000 – Draw −−−−−− Women : World Tour Platinum; 48 players – $295,000 – Draw	10–17 September	(Egypt) Nouran Gohar; 11–7, 11–4, 5–11, 7–11, 12–10 (11th PSA title)	(Egypt) Nour El Sherbini	(France) Camille Serme (United States) Amanda Sobhy	(Egypt) Hania El Hammamy (Egypt) Salma Hany (Egypt) Rowan Elaraby (Egypt) Farida Mohamed
NASH Cup; London, Canada; Men : Challenger 10; 24 players – $12,000 −−−−−− Women : Challenger 10; 24 players – $12,000	14–18 September	(France) Auguste Dussourd; 11–9, 12–10, 11–6 (9th PSA title)	(United States) Timothy Brownell	(Czech Republic) Daniel Mekbib (Canada) Shawn Delierre	(Hong Kong) Tang Ming Hong (Canada) Michael McCue (England) Simon Herbert (Hong Kong) Wong Chi Him
NASH Cup; London, Canada; Men : Challenger 10; 24 players – $12,000 −−−−−− Women : Challenger 10; 24 players – $12,000	14–18 September	(England) Lucy Beecroft; 11–6, 8–11, 11–3, 11–3 (2nd PSA title)	(Poland) Karina Tyma	(United States) Marina Stefanoni (Hong Kong) Vanessa Chu	(France) Marie Stephan (Canada) Nikki Todd (Canada) Amal Izhar (Canada) Hannah Blatt
Heroes Graz Open; Graz, Austria; Men : Challenger 10; 24 players – $12,000	15–19 September	(Egypt) Moustafa El Sirty; 11–9, 11–5, 11–6 (8th PSA title)	(Egypt) Yahya Elnawasany	(Japan) Ryosei Kobayashi (Hong Kong) Alex Lau	(India) Mahesh Mangaonkar (Hong Kong) Henry Leung (Czech Republic) Jakub Solnický (Hungary) Balázs Farkas
Women's PSA Squash Tour I Moscow, Russia; Women : Challenger 3; 16 players – $1,500	17–19 September	(Russia) Alesya Aleshina; 11–6, 9–11, 11–8, 11–5 (1st PSA title)	(Russia) Varvara Klyueva	(Russia) Ekaterina Glinchikova (Russia) Ekaterina Marusan	(Russia) Varvara Esina (Russia) Ksenia Borkova (Russia) Olga Kuznetsova (Russia) Ksenia Gornaia
Dynam Cup SQ-Cube Open; Yokohama, Japan; Men : Challenger 5; 16 players – $3,000 −−−−−− Women : Challenger 5; 16 players – $3,000	19–20 September	(Japan) Ryūnosuke Tsukue; 11–4, 11–5, 11–3 (3rd PSA title)	(Japan) Naoki Hayashi	(Japan) Yujin Ikeda (Japan) Tomotaka Endo	(Japan) Naoki Sone (Japan) Shota Yasunari (Pakistan) Haris Iqbal (Japan) Hiromichi Suzuki
Dynam Cup SQ-Cube Open; Yokohama, Japan; Men : Challenger 5; 16 players – $3,000 −−−−−− Women : Challenger 5; 16 players – $3,000	19–20 September	(Japan) Satomi Watanabe; 11–8, 11–3, 11–5 (3rd PSA title)	(Japan) Risa Sugimoto	(Japan) Akari Midorikawa (Japan) Kurumi Takahashi	(Japan) Chinatsu Matsui (Japan) Yukino Sakurai (Japan) Ayaka Matsuzawa (Japan) Ryoko Kadota
Bremer Schlüssel; Bremen, Germany; Men : Challenger 10; 24 players – $6,000 −−−−−− Women : Challenger 5; 16 players – $3,000	21–25 September	(Spain) Bernat Jaume; 11–9, 11–9, 11–7 (5th PSA title)	(India) Mahesh Mangaonkar	(Colombia) Juan Camilo Vargas (Czech Republic) Martin Švec	(Hungary) Balázs Farkas (Switzerland) Yannick Wilhelmi (Czech Republic) Marek Panáček (Spain) Hugo Varela
Bremer Schlüssel; Bremen, Germany; Men : Challenger 10; 24 players – $6,000 −−−−−− Women : Challenger 5; 16 players – $3,000	21–25 September	(Netherlands) Milou van der Heijden; 11–9, 11–8, 11–3 (10th PSA title)	(Germany) Katerina Týcová	(Netherlands) Tessa ter Sluis (Spain) Cristina Gómez	(Denmark) Klara Møller (Hungary) Hannah Chukwu (Czech Republic) Tamara Holzbauerová (Germany) Saskia Beinhard
Springfield Scottish Open; Inverness, Scotland; Men : Challenger 10; 24 players – $12,000 −−−−−− Women : Challenger 10; 24 players – $12,000	22–26 September	(France) Sébastien Bonmalais; 12–10, 11–5, 11–7 (6th PSA title)	(Wales) Emyr Evans	(England) Nick Wall (England) Curtis Malik	(Portugal) Rui Soares (India) Abhay Singh (Czech Republic) Viktor Byrtus (Czech Republic) Jakub Solnický
Springfield Scottish Open; Inverness, Scotland; Men : Challenger 10; 24 players – $12,000 −−−−−− Women : Challenger 10; 24 players – $12,000	22–26 September	(England) Georgina Kennedy; 11–0, 11–3, 11–3 (7th PSA title)	(England) Grace Gear	(England) Torrie Malik (Scotland) Georgia Adderley	(England) Alicia Mead (France) Marie Stephan (England) Julianne Courtice (Scotland) Alison Thomson
T.H. Quinn Cincinnati Queen City Open; Cincinnati, United States; Men : Challenger 10; 24 players – $12,000	22–26 September	(England) Nathan Lake; 11–4, 11–3, 11–5 (6th PSA title)	(France) Auguste Dussourd	(Pakistan) Nasir Iqbal (Egypt) Aly Abou Eleinen	(United States) Christopher Gordon (Czech Republic) Daniel Mekbib (United States) Faraz Khan (Malaysia) Addeen Idrakie
Oracle Netsuite Open; San Francisco, United States; Men : World Tour Gold; 16 players – $121,000 −−−−−− Women : World Tour Gold; 16 players – $121,000	23–27 September	(Egypt) Ali Farag; 9–11, 12–10, 11–8, 11–8 (24th PSA title)	(New Zealand) Paul Coll	(Egypt) Mohamed El Shorbagy (Egypt) Mostafa Asal	(Egypt) Karim Abdel Gawad (Egypt) Marwan El Shorbagy (Wales) Joel Makin (Egypt) Tarek Momen
Oracle Netsuite Open; San Francisco, United States; Men : World Tour Gold; 16 players – $121,000 −−−−−− Women : World Tour Gold; 16 players – $121,000	23–27 September	(United States) Amanda Sobhy; 11–7, 11–8, 11–4 (18th PSA title)	(Egypt) Salma Hany	(New Zealand) Joelle King (England) Sarah-Jane Perry	(Egypt) Nouran Gohar (India) Joshna Chinappa (Wales) Tesni Evans (Egypt) Hania El Hammamy
CIB Egyptian Challenger Tour #4; Cairo, Egypt; Men : Challenger 20; 24 players – $12,000 −−−−−− Women : Challenger 20; 24 players – $12,000	25–29 September	(Egypt) Karim El Hammamy; 7–11, 8–11, 11–7, 11–9, 11–4 (3rd PSA title)	(Egypt) Zahed Salem	(Egypt) Khaled Labib (Egypt) Yahya Elnawasany	(Egypt) Moustafa El Sirty (Iraq) Mohamed Hassan (Egypt) Yassin El Shafei (Egypt) Seif Shenawy
CIB Egyptian Challenger Tour #4; Cairo, Egypt; Men : Challenger 20; 24 players – $12,000 −−−−−− Women : Challenger 20; 24 players – $12,000	25–29 September	(Egypt) Hana Ramadan; 11–2, 11–4, 11–7 (6th PSA title)	(Egypt) Nour Aboulmakarim	(Egypt) Kenzy Ayman (Egypt) Nadeen Kotb	(Egypt) Salma El Tayeb (Egypt) Malak Khafagy (Egypt) Fayrouz Aboelkheir (Egypt) Nardine Garas
SRAM PSA 5 Bukit Jalil, Malaysia; Men : Challenger 10; 16 players – $6,000 −−−−−− Women : Challenger 10; 16 players – $6,000	28 Sep. – 1 Oct.	(Malaysia) Ivan Yuen; 11–9, 4–11, 7–11, 11–7, 11–2 (13th PSA title)	(Malaysia) Darren Rahul Pragasam	(Malaysia) Ong Sai Hung (Malaysia) Darren Chan	(Malaysia) Elvinn Keo (Malaysia) Duncan Lee (Malaysia) Hafiz Zhafri (Malaysia) Jia Rong
SRAM PSA 5 Bukit Jalil, Malaysia; Men : Challenger 10; 16 players – $6,000 −−−−−− Women : Challenger 10; 16 players – $6,000	28 Sep. – 1 Oct.	(Malaysia) Aifa Azman; 11–4, 6–11, 15–13, 11–4 (9th PSA title)	(Malaysia) Chan Yiwen	(Malaysia) Ooi Kah Yan (Malaysia) Ainaa Amani	(Malaysia) Aira Azman (Malaysia) Nazihah Hanis (Malaysia) Yee Xin Ying (Malaysia) Aika Azman
Equinox Boston Open; Boston, United States; Men : Challenger 10; 24 players – $12,000	30 Sep. – 3 Oct.	(Egypt) Marwan Tarek; 11–8, 11–6, 11–3 (2nd PSA title)	(Canada) David Baillargeon	(Malaysia) Addeen Idrakie (Colombia) Ronald Palomino	(Pakistan) Hamza Khan (Canada) Nick Sachvie (Canada) Shawn Delierre (Canada) Michael McCue

=== October ===
Tournament	Date	Champion	Runner-Up	Semifinalists	Quarterfinalists
Rockhampton Open; Rockhampton, Australia; Men : Challenger 3; 16 players – $1,500	1–3 October	(Australia) Rhys Dowling; 11–8, 13–11, 11–5 (3rd PSA title)	(Malaysia) Bryan Lim Tze Kang	(Australia) David Turner (Australia) Nicholas Calvert	(Malta) Kijan Sultana (Australia) Cameron Darton (Australia) James Lloyd (Australia) Dylan Molinaro
U.S. Open; Philadelphia, United States; Men : World Tour Platinum; 48 players – $150,000 – Draw −−−−−− Women : World Tour Platinum; 48 players – $150,000 – Draw	1–6 October	(Egypt) Mostafa Asal; 5–11, 5–11, 11–9, 12–10, 11–3 (6th PSA title)	(Egypt) Tarek Momen	(Peru) Diego Elías (Wales) Joel Makin	(England) James Willstrop (New Zealand) Paul Coll (Egypt) Mohamed El Shorbagy (Egypt) Ali Farag
U.S. Open; Philadelphia, United States; Men : World Tour Platinum; 48 players – $150,000 – Draw −−−−−− Women : World Tour Platinum; 48 players – $150,000 – Draw	1–6 October	(Egypt) Nouran Gohar; 9–11, 11–9, 11–7, 11–3 (12th PSA title)	(Egypt) Hania El Hammamy	(Egypt) Nour El Sherbini (United States) Olivia Fiechter	(England) Sarah-Jane Perry (Belgium) Nele Gilis (New Zealand) Joelle King (France) Mélissa Alves
Cleveland Skating Club Open; Shaker Heights, United States; Men : Challenger 30; 24 players – $30,000	7–11 October	(England) Adrian Waller; 6–11, 11–2, 11–7, 10–12, 16–14 (9th PSA title)	(Egypt) Mohamed ElSherbini	(England) Nathan Lake (England) Patrick Rooney	(Scotland) Greg Lobban (France) Lucas Serme (Scotland) Alan Clyne (Hong Kong) Yip Tsz Fung
CAS Serena Hotels/Combaxx International; Islamabad, Pakistan; Men : Challenger 30; 24 players – $30,000 −−−−−− Women : Challenger 10; 24 players – $12,000	11–15 October	(Egypt) Moustafa El Sirty; 9–11, 11–7, 11–6, 12–10 (9th PSA title)	(France) Auguste Dussourd	(Pakistan) Tayyab Aslam (Hong Kong) Henry Leung	(Pakistan) Farhan Zaman (Hong Kong) Alex Lau (Hong Kong) Max Lee (Egypt) Karim El Hammamy
CAS Serena Hotels/Combaxx International; Islamabad, Pakistan; Men : Challenger 30; 24 players – $30,000 −−−−−− Women : Challenger 10; 24 players – $12,000	11–15 October	(Egypt) Salma El Tayeb; 11–6, 12–10, 11–4 (1st PSA title)	(France) Marie Stephan	(Egypt) Nadeen Kotb (Egypt) Fayrouz Aboelkheir	(Switzerland) Nadia Pfister (Egypt) Farah Momen (Pakistan) Noor-ul-Huda (Pakistan) Sadia Gul
Moscow Squash Open; Moscow, Russia; Men : Challenger 5; 24 players – $6,000 −−−−−− Women : Challenger 5; 24 players – $6,000	16–19 October	(Colombia) Juan Camilo Vargas; 5–11, 11–7, 5–11, 11–7, 11–2 (6th PSA title)	(Hungary) Balázs Farkas	(Russia) Vladislav Titov (Czech Republic) David Zeman	(Austria) Jakob Dirnberger (France) Edwin Clain (Ukraine) Valeriy Fedoruk (India) Sandeep Ramachandran
Moscow Squash Open; Moscow, Russia; Men : Challenger 5; 24 players – $6,000 −−−−−− Women : Challenger 5; 24 players – $6,000	16–19 October	(England) Lily Taylor; 11–8, 11–4, 11–6 (2nd PSA title)	(Hungary) Hannah Chukwu	(Russia) Alesya Aleshina (Egypt) Nour Megahed	(Germany) Saskia Beinhard (Ukraine) Anastasia Kostiukova (Russia) Varvara Esina (Germany) Aylin Günsav
Qatar Classic; Doha, Qatar; Men : World Tour Platinum; 48 players – $187,500 – Draw	17–23 October	(Peru) Diego Elías; 13–11, 5–11, 13–11, 11–9 (9th PSA title)	(New Zealand) Paul Coll	(Wales) Joel Makin (Egypt) Mostafa Asal	(Egypt) Tarek Momen (Egypt) Mohamed Abouelghar (Germany) Raphael Kandra (Egypt) Mazen Hesham
DAC Pro Squash Classic; Detroit, United States; Women : World Tour Bronze; 24 players – $61,000	19–23 October	(Egypt) Nouran Gohar; 11–8, 11–6, 11–1 (13th PSA title)	(England) Georgina Kennedy	(United States) Olivia Clyne (Belgium) Tinne Gilis	(Wales) Tesni Evans (New Zealand) Joelle King (Malaysia) Sivasangari Subramaniam (Belgium) Nele Gilis
Gibraltar Open; Gibraltar; Men : Challenger 5; 16 players – $6,000 −−−−−− Women : Challenger 5; 16 players – $6,000	20–23 October	(England) Nick Wall; 11–7, 11–6, 11–6 (2nd PSA title)	(Spain) Iván Pérez	(England) Miles Jenkins (England) Simon Herbert	(Spain) Hugo Varela (England) Ben Smith (Wales) Elliott Morris Devred (Spain) Arón Astray
Gibraltar Open; Gibraltar; Men : Challenger 5; 16 players – $6,000 −−−−−− Women : Challenger 5; 16 players – $6,000	20–23 October	(Scotland) Alison Thomson; 11–7, 11–7, 11–8 (1st PSA title)	(Spain) Marta Domínguez	(Netherlands) Tessa ter Sluis (England) Anna Kimberley	(England) Grace Gear (England) Katie Wells (Germany) Aylin Günsav (Scotland) Katriona Allen
Novum Energy Texas Open; Houston, United States; Men : Challenger 10; 24 players – $12,000	20–24 October	(Scotland) Rory Stewart; 12–10, 10–12, 17–19, 11–5, 11–3 (5th PSA title)	(England) Sam Todd	(United States) Spencer Lovejoy (New Zealand) Lwamba Chileshe	(South Africa) Jean-Pierre Brits (Wales) Emyr Evans (Egypt) Karim Elbarbary (Wales) Peter Creed
Oxford Properties Canadian Open; Toronto, Canada; Men : Challenger 10; 24 players – $6,000 −−−−−− Women : Challenger 10; 24 players – $6,000	20–24 October	(Canada) David Baillargeon; 11–7, 7–11, 11–2, 11–3 (4th PSA title)	(Canada) Shawn Delierre	(Canada) Nick Sachvie (Canada) Michael McCue	(Canada) George Crowne (Canada) Connor Turk (Canada) Cameron Seth (Canada) Andrew Schnell
Oxford Properties Canadian Open; Toronto, Canada; Men : Challenger 10; 24 players – $6,000 −−−−−− Women : Challenger 10; 24 players – $6,000	20–24 October	(Canada) Danielle Letourneau; 13–15, 11–3, 7–11, 11–9, 11–8 (6th PSA title)	(Canada) Hollie Naughton	(Canada) Nikki Todd (Canada) Nicole Bunyan	(Canada) Samantha Cornett (Canada) Molly Chadwick (Chile) Giselle Delgado (Canada) Hannah Blatt
Bangabandhu Ispahani Squash Tournament; Dhaka, Bangladesh; Men : Challenger 5; 24 players – $6,000	20–24 October	(Egypt) Yassin ElShafei; 9–11, 11–4, 11–8, 11–7 (1st PSA title)	(Pakistan) Noor Zaman	(India) Navaneeth Prabhu (India) Abhishek Agarwal	(Iran) Sepehr Etemadpoor (India) Rahul Baitha (Pakistan) Ashab Irfan (Egypt) Omar El Hadidi
Prestbury Squash Open; Prestbury, England; Men : Challenger 3; 16 players – $1,500 −−−−−− Women : Challenger 3; 16 players – $1,500	22–24 October	(England) Curtis Malik; 11–9, 11–2, 11–5 (1st PSA title)	(England) Charlie Lee	(England) Perry Malik (France) Brice Nicolas	(England) James Peach (France) Baptiste Bouin (Scotland) John Meehan (England) Harry Falconer
Prestbury Squash Open; Prestbury, England; Men : Challenger 3; 16 players – $1,500 −−−−−− Women : Challenger 3; 16 players – $1,500	22–24 October	(England) Lily Taylor; 11–2, 11–8, 11–9 (3rd PSA title)	(England) Torrie Malik	(England) Polly Clark (England) Kace Bartley	(France) Ella Gálová (Egypt) Rana Ismail (England) Saran Nghiem (Switzerland) Nadia Pfister
The Hamilton Open; Lancaster, United States; Women : Challenger 10; 24 players – $12,000	26–30 October	(Hong Kong) Chan Sin Yuk; 12–10, 11–4, 11–3 (3rd PSA title)	(Finland) Emilia Soini	(Latvia) Ineta Mackeviča (England) Margot Prow	(Mexico) Diana García (England) Lucy Beecroft (India) Akanksha Salunkhe (Egypt) Ingy Hammouda
SRAM PSA 6 Kuala Lumpur, Malaysia; Men : Challenger 10; 24 players – $6,000 −−−−−− Women : Challenger 10; 24 players – $6,000	27–30 October	(Malaysia) Ivan Yuen; 11–5, 11–9, 11–0 (14th PSA title)	(Malaysia) Mohd Syafiq Kamal	(Malaysia) Addeen Idrakie (Malaysia) Darren Rahul Pragasam	(Malaysia) Ong Sai Hung (Malaysia) Wee Ming Hock (Malaysia) Duncan Lee (Malaysia) Hafiz Zhafri
SRAM PSA 6 Kuala Lumpur, Malaysia; Men : Challenger 10; 24 players – $6,000 −−−−−− Women : Challenger 10; 24 players – $6,000	27–30 October	(Malaysia) Aifa Azman; 11–5, 11–1, 11–3 (10th PSA title)	(Malaysia) Chan Yiwen	(Malaysia) Aira Azman (Malaysia) Yee Xin Ying	(Malaysia) Ainaa Amani (Malaysia) Ooi Kah Yan (Malaysia) Thanusaa Uthrian (Malaysia) Aika Azman
HSC Open; Houston, United States; Men : Challenger 20; 24 players – $20,000	27–31 October	(France) Victor Crouin; 11–5, 11–7, 11–4 (15th PSA title)	(Pakistan) Asim Khan	(United States) Christopher Gordon (Scotland) Alan Clyne	(United States) Timothy Brownell (Wales) Emyr Evans (United States) Spencer Lovejoy (Mexico) César Salazar
Swiss Open & Uster Cup; Uster, Switzerland; Men : Challenger 5; 32 players – $6,000 −−−−−− Women : Challenger 3; 16 players – $3,000	27–31 October	(England) Nick Wall; 6–11, 11–7, 11–9, 11–1 (3rd PSA title)	(Portugal) Rui Soares	(Switzerland) Yannick Wilhelmi (Hungary) Balázs Farkas	(Spain) Nilo Vidal (Italy) Yuri Farneti (India) Abhishek Pradhan (England) Stuart MacGregor
Swiss Open & Uster Cup; Uster, Switzerland; Men : Challenger 5; 32 players – $6,000 −−−−−− Women : Challenger 3; 16 players – $3,000	27–31 October	(Switzerland) Cindy Merlo; 11–9, 10–12, 16–14, 8–11, 12–10 (2nd PSA title)	(Switzerland) Nadia Pfister	(France) Taba Taghavi (Switzerland) Céline Walser	(Scotland) Katriona Allen (Czech Republic) Eva Feřteková (Spain) Sofía Mateos (Switzerland) Stella Kaufmann
Oliver Sport NZ Squash Classic; Lower Hutt, New Zealand; Men : WSF & PSA Satellite; 16 players – $3,500 −−−−−− Women : WSF & PSA Satellite; 16 players – $3,500	29–31 October	(New Zealand) Evan Williams; 12–10, 12–10, 5–11, 11–8	(New Zealand) Chris van der Salm	(New Zealand) Willz Donnelly (New Zealand) Glenn Templeton	(New Zealand) Tom Marshall (New Zealand) Jonathan Barnett (New Zealand) Cameron Scott (New Zealand) Connor Plumley
Oliver Sport NZ Squash Classic; Lower Hutt, New Zealand; Men : WSF & PSA Satellite; 16 players – $3,500 −−−−−− Women : WSF & PSA Satellite; 16 players – $3,500	29–31 October	(New Zealand) Kaitlyn Watts; 14–12, 11–8, 8–11, 11–9	(New Zealand) Emma Millar	(New Zealand) Jena Gregory (New Zealand) Diana Galloway	(New Zealand) Winona-Jo Joyce (New Zealand) Holly Shuja (New Zealand) Maiden-Lee Coe (New Zealand) Hannah Grimmett

=== November ===
Tournament	Date	Champion	Runner-Up	Semifinalists	Quarterfinalists
14th CNS International Squash Tournament; Karachi, Pakistan; Men : Challenger 20; 24 players – $20,000	2–6 November	(Egypt) Moustafa El Sirty; 11–5, 7–11, 11–7, 3–11, 11–9 (10th PSA title)	(Hong Kong) Yip Tsz Fung	(Pakistan) Tayyab Aslam (United States) Todd Harrity	(Egypt) Yahya Elnawasany (Hong Kong) Henry Leung (Hong Kong) Alex Lau (Pakistan) Asim Khan
Open PSA Lagord; Lagord, France; Men : Challenger 10; 24 players – $12,000	2–6 November	(Egypt) Mazen Gamal; 5–11, 11–9, 11–6, 11–7 (10th PSA title)	(France) Auguste Dussourd	(France) Benjamin Aubert (Japan) Ryosei Kobayashi	(Italy) Yuri Farneti (Colombia) Juan Camilo Vargas (Spain) Hugo Varela (Germany) Yannik Omlor
The Northern Joe Cup; Manchester, England; Men : Challenger 5; 24 players – $3,000 −−−−−− Women : Challenger 5; 24 players – $3,000	3–7 November	(England) Nick Wall; 8–11, 11–4, 12–10, 11–7 (4th PSA title)	(England) Charlie Lee	(England) Stuart MacGregor (England) Harry Falconer	(England) Perry Malik (England) Miles Jenkins (Brazil) Vini Rodrigues (England) Lewis Doughty
The Northern Joe Cup; Manchester, England; Men : Challenger 5; 24 players – $3,000 −−−−−− Women : Challenger 5; 24 players – $3,000	3–7 November	(England) Grace Gear; 11–9, 10–12, 11–4, 11–5 (1st PSA title)	(Scotland) Georgia Adderley	(England) Lily Taylor (England) Saran Nghiem	(Spain) Cristina Gómez (England) Alicia Mead (France) Élise Romba (England) Katie Wells
PSA Challenger de Gatineau; Gatineau, Canada; Men : Challenger 5; 24 players – $3,000	3–7 November	(Canada) Nick Sachvie; 11–7, 11–7, 11–6 (5th PSA title)	(Canada) David Baillargeon	(Canada) Cameron Seth (Canada) Shawn Delierre	(Canada) Liam Marrison (Canada) Salah Eltorgman (Canada) Abbas Nawaz (Canada) Maximilien Godbout
Exeter Golf & Country Club Open; Exeter, England; Men : Challenger 3; 16 players – $3,000 −−−−−− Women : Challenger 3; 16 players – $3,000	5–7 November	(England) Tom Walsh; 4–11, 11–2, 11–7, 8–11, 11–6 (1st PSA title)	(England) Simon Herbert	(England) James Peach (Republic of Ireland) Sam Buckley	(Poland) Filip Jarota (Denmark) Theis Houlberg (England) Mike Harris (England) Robert Dadds
Exeter Golf & Country Club Open; Exeter, England; Men : Challenger 3; 16 players – $3,000 −−−−−− Women : Challenger 3; 16 players – $3,000	5–7 November	(Scotland) Alison Thomson; 15–13, 11–7, 11–6 (2nd PSA title)	(England) Katie Malliff	(Egypt) Rana Ismail (England) Kace Bartley	(England) Emma Bartley (Scotland) Katriona Allen (England) Polly Clark (England) Kiera Marshall
SRAM PSA 7 Kuala Lumpur, Malaysia; Men : Challenger 10; 24 players – $6,000 −−−−−− Women : Challenger 10; 24 players – $6,000	6–9 November	(Malaysia) Ivan Yuen; 11–4, 12–10, 11–6 (15th PSA title)	(Malaysia) Addeen Idrakie	(Malaysia) Mohd Syafiq Kamal (Malaysia) Ong Sai Hung	(Malaysia) Elvinn Keo (Malaysia) Danial Nurhaqiem (Malaysia) Wee Ming Hock (Malaysia) Darren Rahul Pragasam
SRAM PSA 7 Kuala Lumpur, Malaysia; Men : Challenger 10; 24 players – $6,000 −−−−−− Women : Challenger 10; 24 players – $6,000	6–9 November	(Malaysia) Rachel Arnold; 11–8, 7–11, 11–9, 11–9 (5th PSA title)	(Malaysia) Aifa Azman	(Malaysia) Aira Azman (Malaysia) Ainaa Amani	(Malaysia) Yee Xin Ying (Malaysia) Ooi Kah Yan (Malaysia) Chan Yiwen (Malaysia) Aika Azman
Open International Niort-Venise Verte; Bessines, France; Men : Challenger 10; 24 players – $12,000	8–12 November	(France) Auguste Dussourd; 13–11, 11–5, 11–6 (10th PSA title)	(France) Benjamin Aubert	(Italy) Yuri Farneti (Argentina) Leandro Romiglio	(Egypt) Mazen Gamal (England) Robert Downer (Colombia) Juan Camilo Vargas (Spain) Sergio García
Capra Bærum Open; Lysaker, Norway; Men : Challenger 10; 24 players – $12,000 −−−−−− Women : Challenger 10; 24 players – $12,000	11–14 November	(Egypt) Moustafa El Sirty; 6–11, 11–7, 11–8, 11–8 (11th PSA title)	(Spain) Bernat Jaume	(Hong Kong) Alex Lau (Hong Kong) Wong Chi Him	(England) Nick Wall (Hong Kong) Max Lee (Hong Kong) Henry Leung (Portugal) Rui Soares
Capra Bærum Open; Lysaker, Norway; Men : Challenger 10; 24 players – $12,000 −−−−−− Women : Challenger 10; 24 players – $12,000	11–14 November	(England) Jasmine Hutton; 11–4, 11–8, 11–7 (4th PSA title)	(Spain) Cristina Gómez	(Hong Kong) Tong Tsz Wing (Hong Kong) Liu Tsz Ling	(Scotland) Georgia Adderley (Hong Kong) Ho Tze-Lok (England) Katie Malliff (England) Anna Kimberley
Angers PSA Open; Angers, France; Men : Challenger 3; 16 players – $3,000	16–18 November	(Argentina) Leandro Romiglio; 11–0, 11–7, 7–11, 8–11, 11–3 (6th PSA title)	(India) Abhishek Agarwal	(France) Manuel Paquemar (India) Sandeep Ramachandran	(Liechtenstein) David Maier (Zimbabwe) Blessing Muhwati (France) Joshua Phinéra (Germany) Tobias Weggen
Canary Wharf Classic; London, England; Men : World Tour Gold; 24 players – $100,000	14–19 November	(New Zealand) Paul Coll; 7–11, 13–11, 11–5, 11–6 (16th PSA title)	(Egypt) Ali Farag	(Peru) Diego Elías (Egypt) Tarek Momen	(France) Grégoire Marche (Wales) Joel Makin (Egypt) Mostafa Asal (Colombia) Miguel Ángel Rodríguez
Czech Open; Brno, Czech Republic; Men : Challenger 20; 24 players – $12,000 −−−−−− Women : Challenger 20; 24 players – $12,000	15–19 November	(Switzerland) Nicolas Müller; 11–7, 11–5, 11–7 (11th PSA title)	(Switzerland) Dimitri Steinmann	(France) Lucas Serme (France) Sébastien Bonmalais	(Colombia) Juan Camilo Vargas (England) Robert Downer (Spain) Bernat Jaume (Czech Republic) Daniel Mekbib
Czech Open; Brno, Czech Republic; Men : Challenger 20; 24 players – $12,000 −−−−−− Women : Challenger 20; 24 players – $12,000	15–19 November	(Wales) Emily Whitlock; 11–9, 11–5, 7–11, 6–11, 1–2, rtd. (18th PSA title)	(France) Mélissa Alves	(Spain) Cristina Gómez (France) Marie Stephan	(England) Lily Taylor (England) Lucy Beecroft (England) Grace Gear (England) Anna Kimberley
London Open; London, England; Men : Challenger 20; 24 players – $20,000 −−−−−− Women : Challenger 20; 24 players – $20,000	17–21 November	(England) James Willstrop; 11–5, 11–7, 12–10 (22nd PSA title)	(England) Tom Richards	(England) George Parker (England) Ben Coleman	(England) Joe Lee (Hong Kong) Yip Tsz Fung (England) Patrick Rooney (Hong Kong) Alex Lau
London Open; London, England; Men : Challenger 20; 24 players – $20,000 −−−−−− Women : Challenger 20; 24 players – $20,000	17–21 November	(England) Georgina Kennedy; 11–4, 11–5, 11–3 (8th PSA title)	(England) Julianne Courtice	(Hong Kong) Ho Tze-Lok (South Africa) Alexandra Fuller	(Canada) Danielle Letourneau (Scotland) Alison Thomson (Hong Kong) Liu Tsz Ling (Hong Kong) Tong Tsz Wing
1st 10k Guatemala Open; Guatemala City, Guatemala; Men : Challenger 10; 24 players – $6,000	17–21 November	(Colombia) Ronald Palomino; 12–10, 7–11, 11–5, 11–7 (2nd PSA title)	(United States) Christopher Gordon	(Pakistan) Ahsan Ayaz (Canada) David Baillargeon	(Guatemala) Josué Enríquez (Mexico) Alejandro Reyes (Mexico) Arturo Salazar (Colombia) Edgar Ramírez
Head Open; São Caetano do Sul, Brazil; Men : Challenger 3; 16 players – $1,500	18–21 November	(Argentina) Miguel Pujol; 11–5, 11–9, 11–9 (1st PSA title)	(Brazil) Diego Gobbi	(Brazil) Yuri Pollak (Paraguay) Francesco Marcantonio	(Brazil) Murilo Fernandes (Argentina) Lisandro Ortiz (Brazil) Gabriel Pederiva (Brazil) Pedro Mometto
Romanian Open; Florești, Romania; Men : Challenger 5; 16 players – $6,000	19–21 November	(Hungary) Balázs Farkas; 11–5, 8–11, 11–9, 5–11, 11–6 (7th PSA title)	(England) Ben Smith	(Wales) Elliott Morris Devred (Switzerland) Robin Gadola	(Israel) Daniel Poleshchuk (India) Abhishek Pradhan (India) Aadit Zaveri (India) Abhishek Agarwal
David Lloyd Men's Open; Croydon, England; Men : Challenger 3; 16 players – $3,000	19–21 November	(England) James Peach; 11–3, 11–4, 11–9 (1st PSA title)	(Wales) Owain Taylor	(Scotland) Fergus Richards (Kuwait) Ammar Al-Tamimi	(Scotland) Alasdair Prott (England) Perry Malik (England) Jack Turney (England) Aaron Allpress
Malaysian Open; Kuala Lumpur, Malaysia; Men : World Tour Bronze; 24 players – $50,000 −−−−−− Women : World Tour Bronze; 24 players – $50,000	23–27 November	(India) Saurav Ghosal; 11–7, 11–8, 13–11 (10th PSA title)	(Colombia) Miguel Ángel Rodríguez	(France) Victor Crouin (Malaysia) Eain Yow	(Hong Kong) Yip Tsz Fung (France) Lucas Serme (Switzerland) Nicolas Müller (United States) Shahjahan Khan
Malaysian Open; Kuala Lumpur, Malaysia; Men : World Tour Bronze; 24 players – $50,000 −−−−−− Women : World Tour Bronze; 24 players – $50,000	23–27 November	(Malaysia) Aifa Azman; 12–10, 11–8, 11–4 (11th PSA title)	(Egypt) Salma Hany	(Canada) Danielle Letourneau (Canada) Hollie Naughton	(Malaysia) Rachel Arnold (Hong Kong) Ho Tze-Lok (Egypt) Nadine Shahin (Egypt) Hana Ramadan
Aston & Fincher Sutton Coldfield International; Sutton Coldfield, England; Men : Challenger 5; 24 players – $6,000 −−−−−− Women : Challenger 5; 24 players – $6,000	23–27 November	(England) Sam Todd; 11–4, 11–8, 11–2 (2nd PSA title)	(England) Miles Jenkins	(England) Joe Lee (England) Ben Smith	(England) James Peach (Wales) Elliott Morris Devred (England) Stuart MacGregor (New Zealand) Temwa Chileshe
Aston & Fincher Sutton Coldfield International; Sutton Coldfield, England; Men : Challenger 5; 24 players – $6,000 −−−−−− Women : Challenger 5; 24 players – $6,000	23–27 November	(England) Alicia Mead; 11–7, 11–9, 11–13, 6–11, 11–5 (2nd PSA title)	(England) Torrie Malik	(Egypt) Rana Ismail (England) Asia Harris	(England) Katie Wells (England) Saran Nghiem (England) Kiera Marshall (Finland) Emilia Korhonen
Open de Cognac; Châteaubernard, France; Men : Challenger 5; 24 players – $6,000	24–28 November	(Spain) Iván Pérez; 11–7, 8–11, 11–9, 11–6 (2nd PSA title)	(Egypt) Yahya Elnawasany	(England) Nick Wall (India) Abhishek Agarwal	(Egypt) Mohamed Nasser (France) Edwin Clain (India) Aadit Zaveri (Egypt) Abdallah Elmasry
Czech Pro Series 5 Prague, Czech Republic; Men : Challenger 10; 24 players – $6,000	28 Nov. – 2 Dec.	(France) Benjamin Aubert; 11–8, 11–4, 14–12 (5th PSA title)	(Colombia) Juan Camilo Vargas	(Hungary) Balázs Farkas (Czech Republic) Jakub Solnický	(Wales) Peter Creed (Czech Republic) Daniel Mekbib (Czech Republic) David Zeman (England) Robert Downer
CIB Egyptian Challenger Tour #5; Cairo, Egypt; Men : Challenger 20; 24 players – $20,000 −−−−−− Women : Challenger 20; 24 players – $20,000	30 Nov. – 4 Dec.	(Egypt) Moustafa El Sirty; 13–11, 9–11, 11–1, 4–0, rtd (12th PSA title)	(Egypt) Zahed Salem	(Egypt) Shehab Essam (Qatar) Abdulla Al-Tamimi	(Egypt) Omar Mosaad (Egypt) Yahya Elnawasany (Egypt) Mohamed ElSherbini (Colombia) Miguel Ángel Rodríguez
CIB Egyptian Challenger Tour #5; Cairo, Egypt; Men : Challenger 20; 24 players – $20,000 −−−−−− Women : Challenger 20; 24 players – $20,000	30 Nov. – 4 Dec.	(Egypt) Nada Abbas; 13–11, 7–11, 11–7, 11–5 (3rd PSA title)	(Egypt) Hana Ramadan	(Egypt) Mariam Metwally (Canada) Danielle Letourneau	(Egypt) Yathreb Adel (Egypt) Nour Aboulmakarim (Egypt) Nadine Shahin (Egypt) Zeina Mickawy

=== December ===
Tournament	Date	Champion	Runner-Up	Semifinalists	Quarterfinalists
KCC PSA Challenge Cup; Hong Kong, China; Men : Challenger 5; 16 players – $3,000 −−−−−− Women : Challenger 5; 16 players – $3,000	1–4 December	(Hong Kong) Harley Lam; 11–7, 3–11, 11–4, 11–7 (1st PSA title)	(Hong Kong) Matthew Lai	(Hong Kong) To Wai Lok (Hong Kong) Chung Yat Long	(Hong Kong) Ho Ka Hei (Hong Kong) Andes Ling (Hong Kong) Arthur Law (Hong Kong) Lam Shing Fung
KCC PSA Challenge Cup; Hong Kong, China; Men : Challenger 5; 16 players – $3,000 −−−−−− Women : Challenger 5; 16 players – $3,000	1–4 December	(Hong Kong) Cheng Nga Ching; 7–11, 11–8, 11–6, 11–5 (1st PSA title)	(Hong Kong) Toby Tse	(Hong Kong) Kirstie Wong (Hong Kong) Renee Wu	(Hong Kong) Heylie Fung (Hong Kong) Wai Sze Wing (Hong Kong) Mariko Tam (Singapore) Paige Hill
PAC Squash Open; Rio de Janeiro, Brazil; Men : Challenger 10; 24 players – $6,000	1–5 December	(Brazil) Guilherme Melo; 11–7, 6–11, 11–8, 11–5 (1st PSA title)	(Brazil) Diego Gobbi	(Mexico) Bryan Cueto (Brazil) Pedro Mometto	(Colombia) Andrés Villamizar (Colombia) Edgar Ramírez (England) Hassan Khalil (Paraguay) Francesco Marcantonio
Commercial Water Solutions Grange Challenger; Edinburgh, Scotland; Men : Challenger 5; 32 players – $6,000 −−−−−− Women : Challenger 5; 24 players – $6,000	1–5 December	(England) Curtis Malik; 8–11, 3–11, 11–2, 14–12, 11–8 (2nd PSA title)	(England) Miles Jenkins	(England) Tom Walsh (England) Perry Malik	(England) Stuart MacGregor (India) Abhay Singh (England) Ben Smith (England) Sam Todd
Commercial Water Solutions Grange Challenger; Edinburgh, Scotland; Men : Challenger 5; 32 players – $6,000 −−−−−− Women : Challenger 5; 24 players – $6,000	1–5 December	(Scotland) Georgia Adderley; 11–7, 9–11, 11–9, 11–5 (4th PSA title)	(England) Grace Gear	(England) Lucy Beecroft (England) Alicia Mead	(Scotland) Alison Thomson (England) Katie Wells (New Zealand) Kaitlyn Watts (Scotland) Katriona Allen
MST Dubai Squash Series I Dubai, United Arab Emirates; Men : Challenger 5; 16 players – $3,000	9–11 December	(India) Sandeep Ramachandran; 11–8, 11–3, 11–5 (1st PSA title)	(Egypt) Seifeldin Shams	(Pakistan) Salman Hashmi (United Arab Emirates) Sampuran Banerjee	(Egypt) Omar Afifi (Pakistan) Muhammad Waseem (Pakistan) M Jehangir Khan (Egypt) Abdelaziz Hegazy
Costa del Sol Open; Fuengirola, Spain; Men : Challenger 3; 16 players – $1,500	10–11 December	(Spain) Hugo Varela; 11–9, 8–11, 3–11, 11–8, 11–6 (2nd PSA title)	(England) Tom Walsh	(Spain) Augusto Ortigosa (Spain) Sergio García	(Netherlands) Rowan Damming (Spain) Nilo Vidal (England) Jordan Warne (Spain) Javier Martín
SquashLife Tour – Delft; Delft, Netherlands; Men : WSF & PSA Satellite; 16 players – $2,000	10–11 December	(Italy) Yuri Farneti; 11–6, 11–6, 11–7	(Belgium) Joeri Hapers	(Republic of Ireland) Gavin L'Estrange (Belgium) Thimi Christiaens	(Netherlands) Marc ter Sluis (Zimbabwe) Blessing Muhwati (Belgium) Lowie Delbeke (Netherlands) Guido Lindner
2nd 10k Guatemala Open; Guatemala City, Guatemala; Men : Challenger 10; 24 players – $6,000	8–12 December	(Mexico) Leonel Cárdenas; 11–3, 11–5, 9–11, 6–11, 11–8 (11th PSA title)	(Mexico) Alfredo Ávila	(Canada) Connor Turk (Guatemala) Josué Enríquez	(Pakistan) Ahsan Ayaz (Canada) Salah Eltorgman (Mexico) Alejandro Reyes (Guatemala) Mauricio Sedano
Lockerbie Challenge; Lockerbie, Scotland; Men : Challenger 5; 24 players – $6,000	8–12 December	(England) Nick Wall; 11–8, 6–11, 7–11, 11–3, 11–5 (5th PSA title)	(England) Curtis Malik	(India) Abhay Singh (India) Aadit Zaveri	(Wales) Owain Taylor (Scotland) Andrew Glen (England) Anthony Rogal (England) Lewis Doughty
Sportwerk Women's Open; Hamburg, Germany; Women : Challenger 10; 24 players – $6,000	9–12 December	(England) Grace Gear; 7–11, 9–11, 11–9, 11–9, 11–5 (2nd PSA title)	(Scotland) Georgia Adderley	(France) Marie Stephan (England) Lily Taylor	(France) Énora Villard (Spain) Marta Domínguez (Latvia) Ineta Mackeviča (Netherlands) Tessa ter Sluis
X5 Squash Open; São Paulo, Brazil; Men : Challenger 3; 16 players – $1,500	9–12 December	(Brazil) Diego Gobbi; 11–7, 8–11, 4–11, 11–7, 11–6 (1st PSA title)	(Argentina) Miguel Pujol	(Brazil) Pedro Mometto (Brazil) Yuri Pollak	(Brazil) Vitor Vieira (England) Hassan Khalil (Brazil) Alexandre Baruzzi (Brazil) Rhuan Souza
Boston Open; Boston, England; Men : WSF & PSA Satellite; 16 players – $2,000 −−−−−− Women : WSF & PSA Satellite; 8 players – $2,000	10–12 December	(England) Declan James; 11–7, 11–9, 11–7	(England) Joe Lee	(England) Ben Smith (England) Adam Auckland	(England) Robert Dadds (England) Harry Falconer (England) Matt Gregory (Zimbabwe) Tayne Turnock
Boston Open; Boston, England; Men : WSF & PSA Satellite; 16 players – $2,000 −−−−−− Women : WSF & PSA Satellite; 8 players – $2,000	10–12 December	(England) Julianne Courtice; 11–1, 11–6, 11–4	(Malaysia) Yasshmita Jadishkumar	(England) Katie Wells (England) Polly Clark	(England) Alicia Mead (Portugal) Sofia Aveiro (Jersey) Beth Garton (England) Tashy Baker
Women's PSA Squash Tour III; Moscow, Russia; Women : Challenger 3; 16 players – $1,500	11–12 December	(Russia) Varvara Esina; 12–10, 8–11, 4–11, 11–5, 11–8 (1st PSA title)	(Russia) Maria Arseniev	(Russia) Varvara Klyueva (Russia) Ksenia Borkova	(Russia) Olga Kuznetsova (Belarus) Maria Kozlova (Russia) Ekaterina Glinchikova (Russia) Anastasia Spitsyna
CIB Black Ball Squash Open; New Cairo, Egypt; Women : World Tour Gold; 24 players – $112,500	12–16 December	(Egypt) Nour El Sherbini; 11–7, 9–11, 11–1, 11–7 (27th PSA title)	(Egypt) Hania El Hammamy	(Egypt) Nouran Gohar (England) Georgina Kennedy	(Egypt) Salma Hany (Egypt) Farida Mohamed (Egypt) Nour El Tayeb (Egypt) Rowan Elaraby
Rocafort Open; Barcelona, Spain; Women : Challenger 5; 16 players – $3,000	14–16 December	(Spain) Marta Domínguez; 11–13, 11–4, 11–8, 11–9 (2nd PSA title)	(France) Marie Stephan	(Republic of Ireland) Breanne Flynn (France) Élise Romba	(Spain) Cristina Gómez (Spain) Sofía Mateos (Russia) Varvara Esina (Spain) Inés Gómez
The Colin Payne Kent Open; Tunbridge Wells, England; Men : Challenger 3; 16 players – $3,000 −−−−−− Women : Challenger 3; 16 players – $3,000	15–18 December	(England) Curtis Malik; 11–7, 11–6, 9–11, 11–4 (3rd PSA title)	(England) James Peach	(England) Finnlay Withington (Wales) Owain Taylor	(England) Joshua Masters (England) Jack Mitterer (England) Aaron Allpress (England) Perry Malik
The Colin Payne Kent Open; Tunbridge Wells, England; Men : Challenger 3; 16 players – $3,000 −−−−−− Women : Challenger 3; 16 players – $3,000	15–18 December	(Japan) Satomi Watanabe; 11–7, 11–7, 8–11, 11–9 (4th PSA title)	(England) Torrie Malik	(Egypt) Rana Ismail (England) Kace Bartley	(England) Amy Royle (Portugal) Sofia Aveiro (England) Lara Newton (England) Polly Clark
3rd 10k Guatemala Open; Guatemala City, Guatemala; Men : Challenger 10; 24 players – $6,000	15–19 December	(Mexico) Leonel Cárdenas; 11–5, 11–8, 11–4 (12th PSA title)	(Mexico) Alfredo Ávila	(United States) Faraz Khan (Colombia) Ronald Palomino	(Paraguay) Francesco Marcantonio (Pakistan) Ahsan Ayaz (Colombia) Matías Knudsen (Guatemala) Ricardo Toscano
Sportwerk Men's Open; Hamburg, Germany; Men : Challenger 10; 24 players – $6,000	16–19 December	(France) Auguste Dussourd; 9–11, 11–4, 11–4, 8–11, 11–6 (11th PSA title)	(Finland) Henrik Mustonen	(Germany) Yannik Omlor (Scotland) Rory Stewart	(Germany) Valentin Rapp (France) Edwin Clain (Belgium) Joeri Hapers (Wales) Emyr Evans
Wakefield PSA Open; The Plains, United States; Men : Challenger 10; 16 players – $6,000	16–19 December	(England) Nathan Lake; 7–11, 11–4, 11–7, 11–4 (7th PSA title)	(United States) Shahjahan Khan	(Egypt) Aly Abou Eleinen (England) Lewis Anderson	(England) James Wyatt (England) Mark Broekman (Nigeria) Babatunde Ajagbe (Pakistan) Abdul Malik Khan
Lowes Financial Gosforth Classic; Gosforth, England; Men : WSF & PSA Satellite; 32 players – $2,860	17–19 December	(Scotland) Alan Clyne; 11–4, 11–1, rtd.	(England) Richie Fallows	(Scotland) Jamie Todd (England) Charlie Cowie	
CIB Black Ball Squash Open; New Cairo, Egypt; Men : World Tour Gold; 24 players – $112,500	16–20 December	(New Zealand) Paul Coll; 11–7, 11–5, 13–11 (17th PSA title)	(Egypt) Ali Farag	(Egypt) Mostafa Asal (Egypt) Marwan El Shorbagy	(Egypt) Tarek Momen (France) Grégoire Marche (Wales) Joel Makin (Egypt) Karim Abdel Gawad
Czech Pro Series 6 Ostrava, Czech Republic; Men : Challenger 10; 24 players – $6,000 −−−−−− Women : Challenger 5; 16 players – $3,000	16–20 December	(Argentina) Leandro Romiglio; 11–7, 11–6, 11–6 (7th PSA title)	(Wales) Peter Creed	(Colombia) Juan Camilo Vargas (Czech Republic) Martin Švec	(Czech Republic) Daniel Mekbib (Czech Republic) Jakub Solnický (Hungary) Balázs Farkas (Czech Republic) Viktor Byrtus
Czech Pro Series 6 Ostrava, Czech Republic; Men : Challenger 10; 24 players – $6,000 −−−−−− Women : Challenger 5; 16 players – $3,000	16–20 December	(England) Lily Taylor; 11–7, 11–3, 11–6 (4th PSA title)	(Czech Republic) Natalie Babjuková	(Singapore) Wai Yhann Au Yeong (Finland) Emilia Korhonen	(Czech Republic) Eva Feřteková (Czech Republic) Anna Serme (Austria) Jacqueline Peychär (France) Ella Gálová
QSF No.3; Doha, Qatar; Men : Challenger 10; 24 players – $12,000	20–23 December	(Egypt) Yahya Elnawasany; 9–11, 11–7, 11–7, 11–6 (4th PSA title)	(Egypt) Mazen Gamal	(Egypt) Omar Elkattan (Egypt) Khaled Labib	(Australia) Joseph White (Kuwait) Ammar Al-Tamimi (Egypt) Ibrahim Elkabbani (Russia) Vladislav Titov
Open de Squash Ciudad de Palencia; Palencia, Spain; Men : Challenger 10; 24 players – $6,000	20–23 December	(Spain) Iker Pajares; 11–7, 11–8, 11–6 (10th PSA title)	(Spain) Iván Pérez	(Spain) Sergio García (Spain) Hugo Varela	(France) Benjamin Aubert (Spain) Augusto Ortigosa (France) Paul Gonzalez (Finland) Henrik Mustonen
Toronto Cricket Club 10k Toronto, Canada; Men : Challenger 10; 24 players – $6,000	20–23 December	(United States) Andrew Douglas; 11–7, 11–9, 11–4 (2nd PSA title)	(Canada) Michael McCue	(Canada) David Baillargeon (Canada) James Flynn	(Canada) Shawn Delierre (Canada) George Crowne (Canada) Cameron Seth (Canada) Nick Sachvie
HKFC Christmas PSA; Hong Kong, China; Men : Challenger 5; 16 players – $3,000 −−−−−− Women : Challenger 5; 16 players – $3,000	20–23 December	(Hong Kong) Wong Chi Him; 11–5, 11–6, 11–8 (8th PSA title)	(Hong Kong) Tang Ming Hong	(Hong Kong) Chung Yat Long (Hong Kong) To Wai Lok	(Hong Kong) Harley Lam (Hong Kong) Lam Shing Fung (Hong Kong) Ho Ka Hei (Hong Kong) Matthew Lai
HKFC Christmas PSA; Hong Kong, China; Men : Challenger 5; 16 players – $3,000 −−−−−− Women : Challenger 5; 16 players – $3,000	20–23 December	(Hong Kong) Cheng Nga Ching; 11–7, 8–11, 11–6, 11–3 (2nd PSA title)	(Hong Kong) Kirstie Wong	(Hong Kong) Toby Tse (Hong Kong) Heylie Fung	(Hong Kong) Mariko Tam (Hong Kong) Wai Sze Wing (Hong Kong) Renee Wu (Hong Kong) Jannis Lam
Punjab International Open; Lahore, Pakistan; Men : Challenger 10; 32 players – $6,000	21–25 December	(Pakistan) Asim Khan; 13–11, 11–6, 11–5 (5th PSA title)	(Pakistan) Israr Ahmed	(Pakistan) Tayyab Aslam (Pakistan) Zeeshan Zeb	(Pakistan) Farhan Zaman (Pakistan) Waqas Mehboob (Pakistan) Saeed Abdul (Pakistan) Hamza Sharif
MST Dubai Squash Series II; Dubai, United Arab Emirates; Men : Challenger 5; 16 players – $3,000	23–25 December	(India) Sandeep Ramachandran; 11–9, 11–3, 11–5 (2nd PSA title)	(Egypt) Abdelaziz Hegazy	(Pakistan) Muhammad Waseem (Pakistan) M Jehangir Khan	(Egypt) Seifeldin Shams (United Arab Emirates) Ali Miski (Egypt) Omar Afifi (Egypt) Zeineldin Shams
Women's PSA Squash Tour IV; Moscow, Russia; Women : Challenger 3; 16 players – $1,500	25–26 December	(Russia) Varvara Esina; 11–3, 11–9, 11–6 (2nd PSA title)	(Russia) Varvara Klyueva	(Russia) Ekaterina Marusan (Russia) Ksenia Borkova	(Russia) Olga Kuznetsova (Belarus) Maria Kozlova (Russia) Mariya Golubeva (Russia) Evdokia Knyazeva
QSF No.4; Doha, Qatar; Men : Challenger 10; 24 players – $12,000	26–29 December	(Egypt) Yahya Elnawasany; 11–4, 11–9, 11–7 (5th PSA title)	(Hong Kong) Henry Leung	(Hong Kong) Alex Lau (Qatar) Syed Azlan Amjad	(Egypt) Ibrahim Elkabbani (Hong Kong) Max Lee (Iran) Alireza Shameli (Egypt) Seif Shenawy
CM Punjab International Open; Lahore, Pakistan; Men : Challenger 10; 32 players – $6,000	27–31 December	(Pakistan) Tayyab Aslam; 11–4, 8–11, 11–6, 11–4 (11th PSA title)	(Pakistan) Israr Ahmed	(Pakistan) Asim Khan (Pakistan) Salman Saleem	(Pakistan) Noor Zaman (Pakistan) Waqas Mehboob (Pakistan) Mehran Javed (Pakistan) Waqar Mehboob

=== January ===
Tournament	Date	Champion	Runner-Up	Semifinalists	Quarterfinalists
Houston Open; Houston, United States; Men : World Tour Gold; 24 players – $110,000	4–9 January	(Egypt) Ali Farag; 11–6, 8–11, 11–7, 11–3 (25th PSA title)	(Egypt) Mazen Hesham	(Egypt) Mostafa Asal (France) Grégoire Marche	(England) Nathan Lake (Egypt) Marwan El Shorbagy (Egypt) Youssef Soliman (Colombia) Miguel Ángel Rodríguez
38ème Open du Gard; Nîmes, France; Women : WSF & PSA Satellite; 16 players – $2,600	8–9 January	(France) Marie Stephan; 11–3, 11–9, 11–7	(France) Énora Villard	(France) Ella Gálová (France) Léa Barbeau	(France) Kara Lincou (France) Ninon Lemarchand (France) Ana Munos (France) Lilou Brévard-Belliot
Sturbridge Capital Motor City Open; Bloomfield Hills, United States; Men : World Tour Silver; 24 players – $80,000	26–30 January	(Peru) Diego Elías; 11–5, 11–8, 11–9 (10th PSA title)	(Egypt) Fares Dessouky	(New Zealand) Paul Coll (Egypt) Tarek Momen	(Egypt) Marwan El Shorbagy (Egypt) Mazen Hesham (Egypt) Karim Abdel Gawad (Malaysia) Eain Yow
Equinox Women's Boston Open; Boston, United States; Women : Challenger 10; 24 players – $12,000	26–30 January	(England) Lucy Turmel; 11–4, 11–2, 11–8 (4th PSA title)	(Hong Kong) Ho Tze-Lok	(Egypt) Fayrouz Aboelkheir (Hong Kong) Tong Tsz Wing	(England) Julianne Courtice (Mexico) Diana García (England) Lily Taylor (France) Marie Stephan
Squash Inn Classic – Sponsored by Faltami; Mexico City, Mexico; Women : Challenger 3; 16 players – $1,500	27–30 January	(Colombia) Laura Tovar; 11–5, 11–8, 12–10 (1st PSA title)	(Colombia) María Tovar	(Mexico) Diana Gasca (Mexico) Aileen Domínguez	(Mexico) Julieta Mondragón (Mexico) Sofía Ramírez (Mexico) Jacqueline Camacho (Mexico) Sofía Chávez
PSA Challenger Le Rêve; Maxéville, France; Men : Challenger 3; 16 players – $3,000	28–30 January	(Switzerland) Yannick Wilhelmi; 11–6, 11–9, 11–3 (2nd PSA title)	(Wales) Emyr Evans	(France) Edwin Clain (France) Toufik Mekhalfi	(Italy) Yuri Farneti (France) Rohan Mandil (Czech Republic) Ondrej Vorlíček (France) Joshua Phinéra
Gold Coast PSA Open; Carrara, Australia; Men : WSF & PSA Satellite; 32 players – $1,800 −−−−−− Women : WSF & PSA Satellite; 16 players – $1,800	28–30 January	(Malaysia) Bryan Lim Tze Kang; 3–11, 11–5, 11–9, 11–5	(Australia) Joseph White	(Australia) Jack Hudson (Australia) Solayman Nowrozi	(Australia) James Lloyd (Australia) Cameron Darton (Australia) Dylan Molinaro (Australia) Caleb Johnson
Gold Coast PSA Open; Carrara, Australia; Men : WSF & PSA Satellite; 32 players – $1,800 −−−−−− Women : WSF & PSA Satellite; 16 players – $1,800	28–30 January	(Australia) Alex Haydon; 6–11, 11–7, 11–9, 7–11, 11–6	(Australia) Tamika Hunt	(Australia) Rachael Grinham (Australia) Madison Lyon	(Malta) Colette Sultana (Australia) Sophie Fadaely (Malta) Lijana Sultana (Australia) Shona Coxsedge
Cleveland Classic; Pepper Pike, United States; Women : World Tour Bronze; 24 players – $51,250	27–31 January	(England) Georgina Kennedy; 11–7, 6–11, 11–2, 11–6 (9th PSA title)	(England) Sarah-Jane Perry	(Belgium) Tinne Gilis (India) Joshna Chinappa	(Egypt) Mariam Metwally (United States) Olivia Fiechter (United States) Sabrina Sobhy (United States) Olivia Clyne

=== February ===
Tournament	Date	Champion	Runner-Up	Semifinalists	Quarterfinalists
Gaynor Cincinnati Cup; Cincinnati, United States; Women : World Tour Bronze; 24 players – $51,250	2–6 February	(Egypt) Nouran Gohar; 11–6, 11–3, 11–8 (14th PSA title)	(United States) Olivia Fiechter	(Malaysia) Sivasangari Subramaniam (England) Georgina Kennedy	(United States) Amanda Sobhy (Belgium) Tinne Gilis (Belgium) Nele Gilis (United States) Olivia Clyne
EM Noll Classic; Philadelphia, United States; Men : Challenger 5; 16 players – $6,000 −−−−−− Women : Challenger 10; 16 players – $12,000	3–6 February	(England) Sam Todd; 11–5, 11–9, 6–11, 4–11, 11–3 (3rd PSA title)	(England) Charlie Lee	(United States) Faraz Khan (Hong Kong) Max Lee	(Pakistan) Ahsan Ayaz (Hong Kong) Henry Leung (United States) Timothy Brownell (United States) Spencer Lovejoy
EM Noll Classic; Philadelphia, United States; Men : Challenger 5; 16 players – $6,000 −−−−−− Women : Challenger 10; 16 players – $12,000	3–6 February	(England) Jasmine Hutton; 14–12, 11–6, 2–11, 19–17 (5th PSA title)	(England) Lucy Turmel	(Hong Kong) Liu Tsz Ling (Hong Kong) Ho Tze-Lok	(Egypt) Fayrouz Aboelkheir (England) Lily Taylor (Hong Kong) Chan Sin Yuk (England) Julianne Courtice
Santiago Open; O Milladoiro, Spain; Men : Challenger 5; 16 players – $6,000	8–10 February	(Spain) Edmon López; 11–7, 11–8, 11–4 (8th PSA title)	(Spain) Sergio García	(Spain) Hugo Varela (Spain) Iván Pérez	(Spain) Augusto Ortigosa (Spain) Nilo Vidal (Spain) Javier Martín (Spain) Pablo Dolz
Aida Sekkei Greetings Squash Championships; Saitama, Japan; Men : Challenger 5; 16 players – $6,000 −−−−−− Women : Challenger 3; 16 players – $3,000	11–13 February	(Japan) Ryūnosuke Tsukue; 11–6, 11–2, 11–8 (4th PSA title)	(Japan) Tomotaka Endo	(Japan) Shota Yasunari (Japan) Naoki Hayashi	(Japan) Tomomine Murayama (Japan) Yuta Ando (Pakistan) Haris Iqbal (Japan) Naoki Sone
Aida Sekkei Greetings Squash Championships; Saitama, Japan; Men : Challenger 5; 16 players – $6,000 −−−−−− Women : Challenger 3; 16 players – $3,000	11–13 February	(Japan) Akari Midorikawa; 11–5, 11–6, 10–12, 11–5 (1st PSA title)	(Japan) Kozue Onizawa	(Japan) Ayaka Matsuzawa (Japan) Yukino Sakurai	(Japan) Akiko Midorikawa (Japan) Himari Midorikawa (Japan) Waka Tachibana (Japan) Ryoko Kadota
Kinetic 3K Challenger; Boynton Beach, United States; Men : Challenger 3; 16 players – $3,000	16–19 February	(England) Tom Walsh; 11–8, 8–11, 11–5, 11–4 (2nd PSA title)	(Argentina) Jeremías Azaña	(Colombia) Andrés Herrera (England) Mark Broekman	(Pakistan) Ahsan Ayaz (United States) Alex Arader (Pakistan) Noor Zaman (Mexico) Miled Zarazúa
Squash on Fire Open; Washington, D.C., United States; Men : World Tour Bronze; 24 players – $50,000 −−−−−− Women : World Tour Bronze; 24 players – $50,000	16–20 February	(Egypt) Mohamed El Shorbagy; 11–5, 11–9, 11–8 (44th PSA title)	(Wales) Joel Makin	(Egypt) Youssef Soliman (Spain) Iker Pajares	(Scotland) Greg Lobban (England) James Willstrop (Egypt) Omar Mosaad (Mexico) César Salazar
Squash on Fire Open; Washington, D.C., United States; Men : World Tour Bronze; 24 players – $50,000 −−−−−− Women : World Tour Bronze; 24 players – $50,000	16–20 February	(Egypt) Nour El Sherbini; 6–11, 11–8, 16–14, 13–11 (28th PSA title)	(New Zealand) Joelle King	(Egypt) Nour El Tayeb (United States) Sabrina Sobhy	(Malaysia) Sivasangari Subramaniam (Malaysia) Rachel Arnold (England) Lucy Turmel (Belgium) Nele Gilis
Roberts & Morrow North Coast Open; Coffs Harbour, Australia; Men : Challenger 10; 24 players – $6,000 −−−−−− Women : Challenger 10; 16 players – $6,000	16–20 February	(Australia) Rex Hedrick; 11–4, 11–7, 11–5 (18th PSA title)	(Australia) Josh Larkin	(Australia) Joseph White (Australia) Rhys Dowling	(Australia) David Turner (Australia) James Lloyd (Australia) Rohan Toole (Australia) Benjamin Ratcliffe
Roberts & Morrow North Coast Open; Coffs Harbour, Australia; Men : Challenger 10; 24 players – $6,000 −−−−−− Women : Challenger 10; 16 players – $6,000	16–20 February	(Australia) Rachael Grinham; 11–7, 9–11, 11–3, 8–11, 11–6 (37th PSA title)	(Australia) Alex Haydon	(Australia) Jessica Turnbull (Australia) Sarah Cardwell	(Australia) Tamika Hunt (Australia) Selena Shaikh (Australia) Maggy Marshall (Australia) Madison Lyon
3rd Sylvester Trophy; Uster, Switzerland; Men : Challenger 5; 32 players – $3,000 −−−−−− Women : Challenger 5; 24 players – $3,000	17–21 February	(England) Simon Herbert; 7–11, 11–8, 10–12, 11–4, 11–4 (2nd PSA title)	(Italy) Yuri Farneti	(England) Stuart MacGregor (Czech Republic) Marek Panáček	(New Zealand) Temwa Chileshe (New Zealand) Lwamba Chileshe (New Zealand) Joel Arscott (Spain) Nilo Vidal
3rd Sylvester Trophy; Uster, Switzerland; Men : Challenger 5; 32 players – $3,000 −−−−−− Women : Challenger 5; 24 players – $3,000	17–21 February	(England) Lily Taylor; 11–3, 11–7, 11–1 (5th PSA title)	(England) Anna Kimberley	(Switzerland) Céline Walser (England) Lucy Beecroft	(England) Alicia Mead (Switzerland) Nadia Pfister (Egypt) Rana Ismail (France) Ella Gálová
1st 10k Guatemala Open; Guatemala City, Guatemala; Men : Challenger 5; 24 players – $6,000	22–26 February	(Mexico) Alfredo Ávila; 11–1, 11–5, 11–6 (14th PSA title)	(Guatemala) Alejandro Enríquez	(England) Tom Walsh (Colombia) Ronald Palomino	(Guatemala) Josué Enríquez (Paraguay) Francesco Marcantonio (Guatemala) Ricardo Toscano (Brazil) Diego Gobbi
PSNS President's Trophy; Seri Menanti, Malaysia; Men : Challenger 5; 24 players – $6,000 −−−−−− Women : Challenger 5; 24 players – $6,000	24–27 February	(Malaysia) Darren Rahul Pragasam; 11–7, 11–6, 11–8 (1st PSA title)	(Malaysia) Ong Sai Hung	(Malaysia) Elvinn Keo (Malaysia) Wee Ming Hock	(Malaysia) Harith Danial (Malaysia) Sanjay Jeeva (Malaysia) Joachim Chuah (Malaysia) Hafiz Zhafri
PSNS President's Trophy; Seri Menanti, Malaysia; Men : Challenger 5; 24 players – $6,000 −−−−−− Women : Challenger 5; 24 players – $6,000	24–27 February	(Malaysia) Chan Yiwen; 11–5, 11–7, 11–3 (2nd PSA title)	(Malaysia) Ooi Kah Yan	(Malaysia) Yee Xin Ying (Malaysia) Teoh Liyen	(Malaysia) Chen Yu Jie (Malaysia) Sehveetrraa Kumar (Malaysia) Heng Wai Wong (Malaysia) Thanusaa Uthrian
Doncaster Cup; Doncaster, England; Men : Challenger 3; 16 players – $3,000	25–27 February	(England) Nick Wall w/o (6th PSA title)	(England) Sam Todd	(England) Curtis Malik (England) Joe Lee	(Wales) Emyr Evans (New Zealand) Lwamba Chileshe (New Zealand) Temwa Chileshe (England) Ben Smith
PSA Hasberger-LVM-Patria Open; Hasbergen, Germany; Men : WSF & PSA Satellite; 16 players – $1,500	26–27 February	(Germany) Yannik Omlor; 8–11, 11–7, 11–9, 5–11, 11–5	(Germany) Valentin Rapp	(Germany) Jan Wipperfürth (Germany) Tobias Weggen	(Germany) Dennis Welte (Germany) Fabian Igelbrink (Germany) Felix Göbel (Germany) Dennis Jensen
PSF Squash Circuit I Islamabad, Pakistan; Men : Challenger 5; 16 players – $6,000	26 Feb. – 1 Mar.	(Pakistan) Farhan Mehboob; 11–6, 11–6, 2–11, 1–11, 11–6 (11th PSA title)	(Pakistan) Hamza Khan	(Pakistan) Waqas Mehboob (Pakistan) Farhan Zaman	(Pakistan) Farhan Hashmi (Pakistan) Zeeshan Zeb (Pakistan) Hamza Sharif (Pakistan) Danish Atlas Khan
Windy City Open; Chicago, United States; Men : World Tour Platinum; 48 players – $250,000 −−−−−− Women : World Tour Platinum; 48 players – $250,000	23 Feb. – 2 Mar.	(New Zealand) Paul Coll; 7–11, 10–12, 11–4, 11–7, 11–9 (18th PSA title)	(Egypt) Youssef Ibrahim	(Egypt) Tarek Momen (Egypt) Marwan El Shorbagy	(Egypt) Fares Dessouky (Egypt) Ali Farag (Wales) Joel Makin (Spain) Iker Pajares
Windy City Open; Chicago, United States; Men : World Tour Platinum; 48 players – $250,000 −−−−−− Women : World Tour Platinum; 48 players – $250,000	23 Feb. – 2 Mar.	(Egypt) Nouran Gohar; 15–13, 11–9, 11–8 (15th PSA title)	(Egypt) Hania El Hammamy	(Egypt) Nour El Sherbini (New Zealand) Joelle King	(United States) Amanda Sobhy (Egypt) Salma Hany (England) Georgina Kennedy (Egypt) Rowan Elaraby

=== March ===
Tournament	Date	Champion	Runner-Up	Semifinalists	Quarterfinalists
Commemoration of the Martyrs of the IRIN; Tehran, Iran; Men : Challenger 3; 16 players – $3,000	1–4 March	(Iran) Alireza Shameli; 11–9, 11–6, 11–8 (3rd PSA title)	(Iran) Sepehr Etemadpoor	(India) Navaneeth Prabhu (Iran) Sami Ghasedabadi	(Iran) Mohammad Kashani (Iran) Soheil Shameli (Iran) Danial Gharooni (Iran) Alireza Riaz
Odense Open (QE); Odense, Denmark; Men : Challenger 10; 24 players – $12,000 −−−−−− Women : Challenger 10; 24 players – $12,000	1–5 March	(Hungary) Balázs Farkas; 11–8, 12–10, 2–11, 11–7 (8th PSA title)	(England) Sam Todd	(United States) Faraz Khan (India) Mahesh Mangaonkar	(Argentina) Leandro Romiglio (Egypt) Yahya Elnawasany (England) Robert Downer (Colombia) Juan Camilo Vargas
Odense Open (QE); Odense, Denmark; Men : Challenger 10; 24 players – $12,000 −−−−−− Women : Challenger 10; 24 players – $12,000	1–5 March	(South Africa) Alexandra Fuller; 11–9, 11–8, 11–3 (9th PSA title)	(England) Katie Malliff	(Egypt) Malak Khafagy (Egypt) Salma El Tayeb	(England) Julianne Courtice (England) Anna Kimberley (Egypt) Menna Hamed (Spain) Marta Domínguez
2nd 10k Guatemala Open; Guatemala City, Guatemala; Men : Challenger 10; 24 players – $12,000 −−−−−− Women : Challenger 5; 16 players – $6,000	1–5 March	(England) Charlie Lee; 11–8, 9–11, 13–11, 11–13, 11–1 (1st PSA title)	(Mexico) Alfredo Ávila	(Guatemala) Josué Enríquez (Mexico) Arturo Salazar	(England) Tom Walsh (Colombia) Edgar Ramírez (United States) Timothy Brownell (Colombia) Ronald Palomino
2nd 10k Guatemala Open; Guatemala City, Guatemala; Men : Challenger 10; 24 players – $12,000 −−−−−− Women : Challenger 5; 16 players – $6,000	1–5 March	(India) Akanksha Salunkhe; 10–12, 11–2, 11–8, 6–11, 11–5 (1st PSA title)	(Mexico) Diana Gasca	(Colombia) Laura Tovar (Australia) Alex Haydon	(Mexico) Aileen Domínguez (Colombia) María Clara Ramírez (Guatemala) Winifer Bonilla (Guatemala) Tabita Gaitán
Calgary CFO Women's Squash Week; Calgary, Canada; Women : Challenger 20; 24 players – $20,000	2–6 March	(Hong Kong) Ho Tze-Lok; 14–16, 12–10, 10–12, 11–9, 11–3 (5th PSA title)	(Hong Kong) Chan Sin Yuk	(Canada) Danielle Letourneau (Hong Kong) Lee Ka Yi	(Australia) Donna Lobban (Hong Kong) Liu Tsz Ling (France) Marie Stephan (Hong Kong) Tong Tsz Wing
Esperance Open; Esperance, Australia; Men : WSF & PSA Satellite; 16 players – $2,000	5–6 March	(Australia) Mike Corren; 11–5, 11–9, 13–11	(Australia) David Ilich	(Australia) Oscar Curtis (Australia) Remi Young	(Australia) Jason Patmore (Australia) Dylan Classen (Australia) Tim Cowell (Australia) Lewis Christie
Dr. Zahra Dental Clinic Squash Tournament; Tehran, Iran; Men : Challenger 3; 16 players – $3,000	6–9 March	(Iran) Alireza Shameli; 11–9, 12–10, 11–3 (4th PSA title)	(Iran) Sami Ghasedabadi	(Iran) Mohammad Kashani (Iran) Sepehr Etemadpoor	(Iran) Soheil Shameli (Iran) Pouya Shafieifard (Iran) Aryan Etemadi (Iran) Faryad Sharifian
OptAsia Championships; London, England; Men : World Tour Gold; 24 players – $109,000	6–11 March	(Egypt) Ali Farag; 4–11, 11–8, 11–8, 13–11 (26th PSA title)	(Peru) Diego Elías	(Switzerland) Nicolas Müller (Egypt) Mohamed El Shorbagy	(Egypt) Mazen Hesham (Egypt) Marwan El Shorbagy (Wales) Joel Makin (Egypt) Karim Abdel Gawad
Women's Kinetic 3K Challenger; Boynton Beach, United States; Women : Challenger 3; 16 players – $3,000	9–12 March	(United States) Marina Stefanoni; 13–11, 11–7, 11–6 (5th PSA title)	(India) Akanksha Salunkhe	(United States) Caroline Fouts (Colombia) Laura Tovar	(Mexico) Diana García (Malaysia) Wen Li Lai (Ecuador) María Paula Moya (Canada) Hannah Blatt
CIB Black Ball Squash Open; New Cairo, Egypt; Women : World Tour Platinum; 48 players – $180,000 – Draw	12–17 March	(Egypt) Nouran Gohar; 17–15, 11–8, 2–0, rtd (16th PSA title)	(Egypt) Nour El Sherbini	(New Zealand) Joelle King (Egypt) Rowan Elaraby	(Egypt) Nour El Tayeb (England) Sarah-Jane Perry (United States) Amanda Sobhy (England) Georgina Kennedy
GillenMarkets Canary Wharf Classic; London, England; Men : World Tour Gold; 24 players – $110,000	13–18 March	(Egypt) Fares Dessouky; 11–5, 13–11, 12–10 (5th PSA title)	(Egypt) Mostafa Asal	(Peru) Diego Elías (Egypt) Mazen Hesham	(Wales) Joel Makin (Switzerland) Nicolas Müller (Egypt) Tarek Momen (France) Victor Crouin
Karachi Open Squash Championships; Karachi, Pakistan; Men : World Tour Bronze; 24 players – $52,500	15–19 March	(Egypt) Karim Abdel Gawad; 11–5, 11–9, 11–6 (24th PSA title)	(Egypt) Youssef Soliman	(Mexico) Leonel Cárdenas (Egypt) Omar Mosaad	(Egypt) Karim El Hammamy (Hong Kong) Henry Leung (United States) Shahjahan Khan (Hong Kong) Alex Lau
Karachi Open Squash Championships; Karachi, Pakistan; Women : Challenger 20; 24 players – $20,000	15–19 March	(Egypt) Nour Aboulmakarim; 11–7, 9–11, 6–8, rtd (2nd PSA title)	(Hong Kong) Chan Sin Yuk	(Scotland) Georgia Adderley (England) Lucy Beecroft	(Switzerland) Nadia Pfister (Hong Kong) Lee Ka Yi (France) Marie Stephan (Malaysia) Yee Xin Ying
PSA Val-de-Reuil Normandie (QE); Val-de-Reuil, France; Men : Challenger 5; 24 players – $6,000 −−−−−− Women : Challenger 5; 24 players – $6,000	17–20 March	(Argentina) Leandro Romiglio; 11–5, 11–7, 9–11, 8–11, 11–9 (8th PSA title)	(Colombia) Juan Camilo Vargas	(Finland) Henrik Mustonen (England) Charlie Lee	(Egypt) Ibrahim Elkabbani (Czech Republic) Viktor Byrtus (Wales) Emyr Evans (New Zealand) Temwa Chileshe
PSA Val-de-Reuil Normandie (QE); Val-de-Reuil, France; Men : Challenger 5; 24 players – $6,000 −−−−−− Women : Challenger 5; 24 players – $6,000	17–20 March	(England) Katie Malliff; 11–9, 11–8, 6–11, 11–5 (1st PSA title)	(Spain) Marta Domínguez	(Germany) Saskia Beinhard (France) Taba Taghavi	(Australia) Alex Haydon (Egypt) Fayrouz Aboelkheir (Germany) Katerina Týcová (Switzerland) Céline Walser
Bangamata Squash Tournament; Chittagong, Bangladesh; Men : Challenger 5; 32 players – $6,000	18–22 March	(Egypt) Yassin ElShafei; 11–7, 6–11, 11–2, 6–11, 11–6 (2nd PSA title)	(India) Abhishek Agarwal	(Pakistan) Hamza Khan (Iran) Alireza Shameli	(Kuwait) Ammar Al-Tamimi (Pakistan) Hamza Sharif (Pakistan) Noor Zaman (Sri Lanka) Ravindu Laksiri
Liverpool Cricket Club Open; Liverpool, England; Men : Challenger 5; 16 players – $6,000	24–26 March	(Scotland) Rory Stewart; 11–9, 11–7, 11–3 (6th PSA title)	(England) Joe Lee	(United States) Spencer Lovejoy (England) Ben Smith	(Wales) Peter Creed (England) Sam Todd (Wales) Emyr Evans (New Zealand) Temwa Chileshe
DHA International Squash Championship; Islamabad, Pakistan; Men : Challenger 10; 24 players – $12,000	26–30 March	(Pakistan) Asim Khan; 10–12, 11–5, 11–7, 7–11, 11–6 (6th PSA title)	(Pakistan) Noor Zaman	(Malaysia) Addeen Idrakie (Pakistan) Israr Ahmed	(France) Edwin Clain (Egypt) Yassin ElShafei (Egypt) Seif Shenawy (Pakistan) Ahsan Ayaz
Allam British Open; Hull, England; Men : World Tour Platinum; 48 players – $180,000 – Draw −−−−−− Women : World Tour Platinum; 48 players – $180,000 – Draw	28 Mar. – 3 Apr.	(New Zealand) Paul Coll; 12–10, 11–6, 11–4 (19th PSA title)	(Egypt) Ali Farag	(Egypt) Mazen Hesham (Egypt) Mostafa Asal	(Switzerland) Nicolas Müller (Egypt) Tarek Momen (Peru) Diego Elías (Colombia) Miguel Ángel Rodríguez
Allam British Open; Hull, England; Men : World Tour Platinum; 48 players – $180,000 – Draw −−−−−− Women : World Tour Platinum; 48 players – $180,000 – Draw	28 Mar. – 3 Apr.	(Egypt) Hania El Hammamy; 11–9, 11–7, 8–11, 11–4 (8th PSA title)	(Egypt) Nouran Gohar	(New Zealand) Joelle King (United States) Amanda Sobhy	(Egypt) Nour El Tayeb (England) Sarah-Jane Perry (United States) Olivia Fiechter (Belgium) Tinne Gilis
White Oaks Classic; Niagara-on-the-Lake, Canada; Men : Challenger 5; 16 players – $6,000	30 Mar. – 2 Apr.	(Czech Republic) Daniel Mekbib; 11–7, 12–10, 11–6 (6th PSA title)	(Canada) Nick Sachvie	(Canada) Shawn Delierre (Canada) Michael McCue	(Hong Kong) Matthew Lai (Canada) Cameron Seth (Mexico) Alejandro Reyes (Mexico) Miled Zarazúa

=== April ===
Tournament	Date	Champion	Runner-Up	Semifinalists	Quarterfinalists
Annecy Rose Open; Seynod, France; Women : Challenger 30; 24 players – $30,000	5–9 April	(Belgium) Tinne Gilis; 11–6, 11–6, 13–11 (3rd PSA title)	(Belgium) Nele Gilis	(Egypt) Nada Abbas (England) Jasmine Hutton	(France) Énora Villard (England) Grace Gear (Egypt) Nardine Garas (Germany) Saskia Beinhard
Sekisui Open; Kriens, Switzerland; Men : Challenger 10; 24 players – $12,000 −−−−−− Women : Challenger 10; 24 players – $12,000	5–9 April	(England) Charlie Lee; 11–4, 11–9, 11–4 (2nd PSA title)	(Switzerland) Yannick Wilhelmi	(Israel) Daniel Poleshchuk (Portugal) Rui Soares	(England) Curtis Malik (Switzerland) Robin Gadola (Czech Republic) Viktor Byrtus (Egypt) Yahya Elnawasany
Sekisui Open; Kriens, Switzerland; Men : Challenger 10; 24 players – $12,000 −−−−−− Women : Challenger 10; 24 players – $12,000	5–9 April	(Switzerland) Cindy Merlo; 6–11, 11–9, 11–9, 11–4 (3rd PSA title)	(Egypt) Salma El Tayeb	(Egypt) Nadeen Kotb (Egypt) Malak Khafagy	(Egypt) Rana Ismail (England) Torrie Malik (Denmark) Klara Møller (Spain) Marta Domínguez
University of Birmingham Open (QE); Birmingham, England; Men : Challenger 5; 24 players – $6,000 −−−−−− Women : Challenger 5; 24 players – $6,000	5–9 April	(Egypt) Ibrahim Elkabbani; 11–7, 11–7, 11–2 (2nd PSA title)	(England) Miles Jenkins	(England) Robert Downer (Hungary) Balázs Farkas	(Republic of Ireland) Sean Conroy (Egypt) Seif Shenawy (England) Simon Herbert (England) Joe Lee
University of Birmingham Open (QE); Birmingham, England; Men : Challenger 5; 24 players – $6,000 −−−−−− Women : Challenger 5; 24 players – $6,000	5–9 April	(Japan) Satomi Watanabe; 11–9, 11–6, 11–6 (5th PSA title)	(Egypt) Nour Aboulmakarim	(England) Lily Taylor (England) Alicia Mead	(United States) Marina Stefanoni (England) Kiera Marshall (Finland) Emilia Korhonen (England) Katie Wells
Rochester Pro-Am; Rochester, United States; Men : Challenger 5; 24 players – $6,000	6–10 April	(Egypt) Aly Hussein; 11–6, 8–11, 11–8, 11–9 (2nd PSA title)	(Czech Republic) Daniel Mekbib	(India) Veer Chotrani (Mexico) Alejandro Reyes	(Mexico) Mario Yáñez (Malaysia) Sanjay Jeeva (England) Mark Broekman (Australia) Nicholas Calvert
BRESS Breda Open; Breda, Netherlands; Men : Challenger 3; 16 players – $3,000	7–10 April	(England) Ben Smith; 11–4, 11–7, 11–2 (1st PSA title)	(Republic of Ireland) Sam Buckley	(Scotland) Alasdair Prott (Hong Kong) Chung Yat Long	(Spain) Sergio García (Netherlands) Roshan Bharos (Ukraine) Valeriy Fedoruk (Scotland) Fergus Richards
Oxford Properties Canadian Open; Calgary, Canada; Men : Challenger 10; 24 players – $12,000 −−−−−− Women : Challenger 30; 24 players – $30,000	11–15 April	(England) Nick Wall; 11–3, 11–3, 11–13, 11–6 (7th PSA title)	(Canada) David Baillargeon	(Hong Kong) Alex Lau (Hong Kong) Henry Leung	(Hong Kong) Max Lee (England) Tom Walsh (Hong Kong) Wong Chi Him (Czech Republic) Daniel Mekbib
Oxford Properties Canadian Open; Calgary, Canada; Men : Challenger 10; 24 players – $12,000 −−−−−− Women : Challenger 30; 24 players – $30,000	11–15 April	(United States) Olivia Fiechter; 11–2, 12–10, 5–11, 11–4 (3rd PSA title)	(Canada) Hollie Naughton	(Canada) Danielle Letourneau (Canada) Nicole Bunyan	(Canada) Nikki Todd (United States) Marina Stefanoni (Germany) Saskia Beinhard (Poland) Karina Tyma
Manchester Open; Manchester, England; Men : World Tour Silver; 24 players – $77,500 −−−−−− Women : World Tour Silver; 24 players – $77,500	13–18 April	(Wales) Joel Makin; 11–7, 5–11, 13–11, 11–4 (4th PSA title)	(Egypt) Mohamed El Shorbagy	(Egypt) Karim Abdel Gawad (England) Patrick Rooney	(Malaysia) Eain Yow (France) Mathieu Castagnet (Germany) Raphael Kandra (Egypt) Youssef Soliman
Manchester Open; Manchester, England; Men : World Tour Silver; 24 players – $77,500 −−−−−− Women : World Tour Silver; 24 players – $77,500	13–18 April	(New Zealand) Joelle King; 11–8, 11–9, 11–8 (14th PSA title)	(England) Sarah-Jane Perry	(Belgium) Nele Gilis (Wales) Tesni Evans	(England) Jasmine Hutton (England) Georgina Kennedy (Wales) Emily Whitlock (Malaysia) Aifa Azman
QSF No.2; Doha, Qatar; Men : Challenger 5; 16 players – $6,000	18–21 April	(Pakistan) Asim Khan; 11–6, 5–11, 11–13, 11–8, 11–7 (7th PSA title)	(Egypt) Khaled Labib	(Qatar) Syed Azlan Amjad (Malaysia) Ong Sai Hung	(Kuwait) Ammar Al-Tamimi (Egypt) Omar Elkattan (Belgium) Joeri Hapers (Malaysia) Darren Rahul Pragasam
Cannon Kirk Irish Squash Open; Dublin, Republic of Ireland; Men : Challenger 30; 24 players – $30,000 −−−−−− Women : Challenger 30; 24 players – $30,000	19–23 April	(Scotland) Greg Lobban; 11–2, 11–5, 11–7 (12th PSA title)	(Scotland) Alan Clyne	(France) Auguste Dussourd (England) George Parker	(England) Declan James (Scotland) Rory Stewart (England) Patrick Rooney (France) Lucas Serme
Cannon Kirk Irish Squash Open; Dublin, Republic of Ireland; Men : Challenger 30; 24 players – $30,000 −−−−−− Women : Challenger 30; 24 players – $30,000	19–23 April	(Belgium) Tinne Gilis; 12–10, 9–11, 11–6, 12–10 (4th PSA title)	(Wales) Emily Whitlock	(South Africa) Alexandra Fuller (England) Grace Gear	(Malaysia) Rachel Arnold (England) Lucy Turmel (England) Julianne Courtice (Australia) Jessica Turnbull
Carol Weymuller Open; New York City, United States; Women : World Tour Bronze; 24 players – $51,250	20–24 April	(Egypt) Rowan Elaraby; 11–7, 6–11, 11–9, 11–6 (7th PSA title)	(Malaysia) Sivasangari Subramaniam	(Egypt) Farida Mohamed (Egypt) Nadine Shahin	(United States) Sabrina Sobhy (Australia) Donna Lobban (United States) Olivia Clyne (Canada) Hollie Naughton
Life Time Atlanta Open; Sandy Springs, United States; Men : Challenger 10; 24 players – $12,000	20–24 April	(Qatar) Abdulla Al-Tamimi; 9–11, 11–8, 10–12, 11–6, 13–11 (6th PSA title)	(Argentina) Leandro Romiglio	(United States) Timothy Brownell (Guatemala) Josué Enríquez	(Colombia) Ronald Palomino (United States) Christopher Gordon (Egypt) Seif Shenawy (England) Mark Broekman
Qualico Manitoba Open; Winnipeg, Canada; Men : Challenger 10; 24 players – $12,000	20–24 April	(England) Nick Wall; 11–7, 11–6, 11–5 (8th PSA title)	(England) Tom Walsh	(Czech Republic) Daniel Mekbib (Wales) Owain Taylor	(United States) Andrew Douglas (England) Sam Todd (United States) Spencer Lovejoy (Canada) Nick Sachvie
Edmonton Squash Club Open; Edmonton, Canada; Men : Challenger 3; 16 players – $3,000	21–24 April	(Hong Kong) Tang Ming Hong; 11–6, 11–8, 11–7 (4th PSA title)	(Hong Kong) Chung Yat Long	(Hong Kong) Harley Lam (Hong Kong) Matthew Lai	(Colombia) Nicolás Serna (England) Aaron Allpress (Hong Kong) To Wai Lok (Czech Republic) Petr Nohel
Fezz Audio PSQ Squash Open; Białystok, Poland; Men : WSF & PSA Satellite; 32 players – $4,000 −−−−−− Women : WSF & PSA Satellite; 32 players – $4,000	23–24 April	(Poland) Jakub Pytlowany; 13–11, 11–8, 11–6	(Spain) Marc López	(Poland) Leon Krysiak (Poland) Kamil Przybitkowski	(Poland) Piotr Hemmerling (Poland) Marcin Sikorski (Poland) Dariusz Filipowski (Poland) Jan Samborski
Fezz Audio PSQ Squash Open; Białystok, Poland; Men : WSF & PSA Satellite; 32 players – $4,000 −−−−−− Women : WSF & PSA Satellite; 32 players – $4,000	23–24 April	(Poland) Natalia Ryfa; 11–9, 11–3, 11–0	(Poland) Dominika Witkowska	(Poland) Kinga Szymaniak (Poland) Julia Patałąg	(Poland) Anna Pozlewicz (Poland) Tola Otrząsek (Poland) Małgorzata Owczarek (Poland) Joanna Wilińska
Richmond Open; Richmond, United States; Women : Challenger 20; 24 players – $20,000	26–30 April	(Egypt) Hana Moataz; 12–10, 8–11, 11–7, 9–11, 11–8 (3rd PSA title)	(Japan) Satomi Watanabe	(Egypt) Zeina Mickawy (England) Katie Malliff	(England) Lucy Beecroft (England) Grace Gear (Australia) Alex Haydon (New Zealand) Kaitlyn Watts
JPM Tournament of Champions Challenger; New York City, United States; Men : Challenger 10; 16 players – $12,000 −−−−−− Women : Challenger 10; 16 players – $12,000	27–30 April	(United States) Timothy Brownell; 11–8, 8–11, 14–12, 11–9 (1st PSA title)	(Egypt) Aly Abou Eleinen	(Qatar) Abdulla Al-Tamimi (United States) Faraz Khan	(United States) Spencer Lovejoy (Hong Kong) Alex Lau (England) Sam Todd (England) Robert Downer
JPM Tournament of Champions Challenger; New York City, United States; Men : Challenger 10; 16 players – $12,000 −−−−−− Women : Challenger 10; 16 players – $12,000	27–30 April	(Hong Kong) Chan Sin Yuk; 14–12, 12–10, 11–5 (4th PSA title)	(Egypt) Kenzy Ayman	(Hong Kong) Lee Ka Yi (Egypt) Sana Ibrahim	(United States) Marina Stefanoni (Egypt) Sohaila Ismail (United States) Lucie Stefanoni (Hong Kong) Tong Tsz Wing
Moreton Bay PSA Satellite; Kippa-Ring, Australia; Men : WSF & PSA Satellite; 16 players – $1,800 −−−−−− Women : WSF & PSA Satellite; 8 players – $1,800	28 Apr. – 1 May	(Malaysia) Bryan Lim Tze Kang; 11–3, 11–5, 11–5	(Australia) Oscar Curtis	(Australia) Caleb Johnson (Australia) David Turner	(Australia) Brad Freeme (Australia) Brendan MacDonald (Australia) Dylan Molinaro (Australia) Corben White
Moreton Bay PSA Satellite; Kippa-Ring, Australia; Men : WSF & PSA Satellite; 16 players – $1,800 −−−−−− Women : WSF & PSA Satellite; 8 players – $1,800	28 Apr. – 1 May	(Australia) Tamika Hunt; 11–8, 11–6, 8–11, 11–6	(Malta) Colette Sultana	(Australia) Madison Lyon (Australia) Maria Kalafatis	(Australia) Grace Pattison
Danny Gamble Squash Open; Canterbury, England; Men : WSF & PSA Satellite; 32 players – $2,600	29 Apr. – 1 May	(England) Ben Coleman; 11–8, 12–10, 10–12, 11–6	(England) Noah Meredith	(England) Curtis Malik (England) Richie Fallows	(Egypt) Abdelrahman Abdelkhalek (England) Phil Nightingale (England) Hasnaat Farooqi (England) Jared Carter
Open National des Jupettes; Gradignan, France; Women : WSF & PSA Satellite; 32 players – $2,500	29 Apr. – 1 May	(France) Léa Barbeau; 11–4, 11–5, 12–10	(France) Ana Munos	(France) Rose Lucas-Marcuzzo (France) Lilou Brévard-Belliot	(France) Sabrina Belliot (France) Inès Guyot (France) Axelle Legrand (France) Marine van Egroo

=== May ===
Tournament	Date	Champion	Runner-Up	Semifinalists	Quarterfinalists
J.P. Morgan Tournament of Champions; New York City, United States; Men : World Tour Gold; 24 players – $115,000 −−−−−− Women : World Tour Gold; 24 players – $115,000	1–7 May	(Egypt) Ali Farag; 16–14, 9–11, 11–9, 11–5 (27th PSA title)	(Peru) Diego Elías	(India) Saurav Ghosal (Egypt) Mazen Hesham	(Egypt) Youssef Ibrahim (France) Victor Crouin (France) Grégoire Marche (Colombia) Miguel Ángel Rodríguez
J.P. Morgan Tournament of Champions; New York City, United States; Men : World Tour Gold; 24 players – $115,000 −−−−−− Women : World Tour Gold; 24 players – $115,000	1–7 May	(Egypt) Nouran Gohar; 11–7, 11–7, 11–3 (17th PSA title)	(United States) Amanda Sobhy	(Egypt) Salma Hany (United States) Olivia Fiechter	(Egypt) Rowan Elaraby (Egypt) Nada Abbas (Canada) Hollie Naughton (United States) Olivia Clyne
Bermuda Open (QE); Devonshire, Bermuda; Men : Challenger 10; 24 players - $12,000 −−−−−− Women : Challenger 10; 24 players - $12,000	3–7 May	(Colombia) Juan Camilo Vargas; 14–12, 7–11, 4–11, 11–9, 11–3 (7th PSA title)	(Scotland) Rory Stewart	(Colombia) Ronald Palomino (Egypt) Seif Shenawy	(Canada) David Baillargeon (Wales) Owain Taylor (England) Robert Downer (England) Tom Walsh
Bermuda Open (QE); Devonshire, Bermuda; Men : Challenger 10; 24 players - $12,000 −−−−−− Women : Challenger 10; 24 players - $12,000	3–7 May	(Egypt) Kenzy Ayman; 8–11, 11–9, 11–6, 11–9 (1st PSA title)	(Scotland) Georgia Adderley	(England) Grace Gear (Poland) Karina Tyma	(Mexico) Diana García (New Zealand) Kaitlyn Watts (Switzerland) Nadia Pfister (Australia) Alex Haydon
Archi Factory Open Lorient; Larmor-Plage, France; Men : Challenger 5; 24 players – $6,000	4–7 May	(India) Abhay Singh; 11–6, 14–16, 9–11, 11–9, 16–14 (1st PSA title)	(Switzerland) Robin Gadola	(Switzerland) Yannick Wilhelmi (Israel) Daniel Poleshchuk	(England) Curtis Malik (England) Ben Smith (France) Toufik Mekhalfi (England) James Peach
Open National du Parc Perpignan; Perpignan, France; Men : WSF & PSA Satellite; 32 players – $2,500	7–8 May	(France) Toufik Mekhalfi; 11–5, 11–7, 11–4	(France) Baptiste Bouin	(France) Macéo Lévy (France) Yann Perrin	(Spain) Pablo Dolz (France) Victor Brygo (France) Jérémy Malavialle (France) Roméo Bily
Qscan Sandgate Open; Deagon, Australia; Women : Challenger 10; 16 players - $12,000	6–9 May	(Japan) Satomi Watanabe; 11–7, 11–9, 11–8 (6th PSA title)	(Malaysia) Aira Azman	(Malaysia) Sehveetrraa Kumar (Australia) Jessica Turnbull	(Australia) Tamika Hunt (Australia) Sarah Cardwell (Malaysia) Ainaa Amani (Malaysia) Yee Xin Ying
Enjoy Open-Challenger 3 Bielsko-Biała, Poland; Men : Challenger 3; 16 players - $3,000	13–14 May	(Israel) Daniel Poleshchuk; 11–8, 11–8, 11–2 (6th PSA title)	(Spain) Marc López	(Poland) Filip Jarota (Poland) Jakub Pytlowany	(Poland) Kajetan Lipski (Poland) Leon Krysiak (Poland) Kamil Przybitkowski (Poland) Marcin Sikorski
Life Time Dallas Open; Plano, United States; Men : Challenger 10; 16 players – $12,000	12–15 May	(United States) Andrew Douglas; 11–6, 6–11, 7–11, 11–1, 16–14 (3rd PSA title)	(England) Nick Wall	(Canada) Nick Sachvie (Germany) Yannik Omlor	(United States) Timothy Brownell (Egypt) Aly Hussein (Canada) Michael McCue (Australia) Joseph White
Esporte Clube Pinheiros Open; São Paulo, Brazil; Men : Challenger 5; 16 players – $6,000	12–15 May	(Guatemala) Josué Enríquez; 11–9, 11–6, 12–10 (2nd PSA title)	(Brazil) Guilherme Melo	(Brazil) Diego Gobbi (Guatemala) Alejandro Enríquez	(Paraguay) Francesco Marcantonio (Argentina) Jeremias Azaña (Colombia) Andrés Herrera (Guatemala) Ricardo Toscano
Barfoot & Thompson Panmure Open; Panmure, New Zealand; Men : Challenger 3; 16 players – $3,000	13–15 May	(New Zealand) Lwamba Chileshe; 11–9, 11–6, 11–9 (3rd PSA title)	(New Zealand) Temwa Chileshe	(Malaysia) Wee Ming Hock (Malaysia) Duncan Lee	(Malaysia) Amir Amirul (Australia) Nicholas Calvert (Malaysia) Hafiz Zhafri (New Zealand) Anthony Lepper
Batch Open; Paris, France; Men : WSF & PSA Satellite; 32 players – $5,000	13–15 May	(France) Auguste Dussourd; 11–5, 11–5, 11–2	(France) Benjamin Aubert	(France) Edwin Clain (France) Toufik Mekhalfi	(France) Johan Bouquet (France) Melvil Scianimanico (France) Manuel Paquemar (France) Joshua Phinéra
NTA Squash Classic; Natick, United States; Men : Challenger 10; 16 players - $12,000 −−−−−− Women : Challenger 10; 16 players - $12,000	18–21 May	(England) Curtis Malik; 4–11, 16–14, 12–14, 11–8, 5–2^{rtd.} (4th PSA title)	(Egypt) Aly Hussein	(England) Nick Wall (England) Sam Todd	(United States) Spencer Lovejoy (United States) Timothy Brownell (Germany) Yannik Omlor (United States) Christopher Gordon
NTA Squash Classic; Natick, United States; Men : Challenger 10; 16 players - $12,000 −−−−−− Women : Challenger 10; 16 players - $12,000	18–21 May	(England) Lucy Beecroft; 11–4, 11–7, 11–5 (3rd PSA title)	(Ukraine) Alina Bushma	(Egypt) Menna Hamed (England) Grace Gear	(United States) Marina Stefanoni (England) Torrie Malik (United States) Lucie Stefanoni (Egypt) Sohaila Ismail
PSA World Championship; Cairo, Egypt; Men : World Championship; 64 players - $550,000 - Draw −−−−−− Women : World Championship; 64 players - $550,000 - Draw	13–22 May	(Egypt) Ali Farag; 9–11, 11–8, 7–11, 11–9, 11–2 (28th PSA title) (3rd World Championship title)	(Egypt) Mohamed El Shorbagy	(Egypt) Mostafa Asal (Australia) Paul Coll	(Egypt) Tarek Momen (Peru) Diego Elías (Egypt) Fares Dessouky (Egypt) Marwan El Shorbagy
PSA World Championship; Cairo, Egypt; Men : World Championship; 64 players - $550,000 - Draw −−−−−− Women : World Championship; 64 players - $550,000 - Draw	13–22 May	(Egypt) Nour El Sherbini; 7–11, 11–7, 11–8, 11–7 (29th PSA title) (6th World Championship title)	(Egypt) Nouran Gohar	(United States) Amanda Sobhy (Egypt) Nour El Tayeb	(England) Sarah-Jane Perry (Egypt) Hania El Hammamy (Egypt) Nada Abbas (Egypt) Rowan Elaraby
Barfoot & Thompson Auckland Open; North Shore, New Zealand; Men : Challenger 5; 24 players – $6,000 −−−−−− Women : Challenger 3; 16 players – $3,000	19–22 May	(New Zealand) Lwamba Chileshe; 10–12, 11–4, 11–6, 11–7 (4th PSA title)	(New Zealand) Temwa Chileshe	(Malaysia) Duncan Lee (Malaysia) Amir Amirul	(New Zealand) Zac Millar (New Zealand) Anthony Lepper (Malaysia) Hafiz Zhafri (New Zealand) Sion Wiggin
Barfoot & Thompson Auckland Open; North Shore, New Zealand; Men : Challenger 5; 24 players – $6,000 −−−−−− Women : Challenger 3; 16 players – $3,000	19–22 May	(New Zealand) Lana Harrison; 11–8, 11–9, 11–7 (1st PSA title)	(New Zealand) Abbie Palmer	(Malaysia) Shasmithaa Nityanandan (New Zealand) Maiden-Lee Coe	(New Zealand) Rachel McLeod (New Zealand) Anne Leakey (New Zealand) Winona-Jo Joyce (New Zealand) Katie Templeton
Canterbury Kings Squash Open; Canterbury, England; Men : WSF & PSA Satellite; 32 players – $2,530	20–22 May	(England) Perry Malik; 11–3, 7–11, 11–9, 11–1	(England) Sam Osborne-Wylde	(Egypt) Ali Khawas (England) Will Salter	(England) Noah Meredith (Malaysia) Ameeshenraj Chandaran (South Korea) Hoony Lee (England) Phil Nightingale
QSF No.3; Doha, Qatar; Men : Challenger 20; 24 players – $20,000	20–24 May	(Qatar) Abdulla Al-Tamimi; 11–2, 11–6, 11–9 (7th PSA title)	(Mexico) Leonel Cárdenas	(Argentina) Leandro Romiglio (Egypt) Yahya Elnawasany	(Wales) Emyr Evans (Egypt) Karim El Hammamy (Egypt) Mazen Gamal (Portugal) Rui Soares
2nd Squash Inn Classic; Mexico City, Mexico; Men : Challenger 3; 16 players – $3,000	26–29 May	(Guatemala) Alejandro Enríquez; 11–6, 11–7, 11–7 (1st PSA title)	(Mexico) Allan Núñez	(Mexico) Leo Vargas (Mexico) Alejandro Reyes	(Mexico) Bryan Cueto (Mexico) Rodolfo Vega (England) Chris Fuller (Mexico) Juan Carlos Gómez
Dynam Cup SQ-Cube Open; Yokohama, Japan; Men : Challenger 5; 16 players – $6,000 −−−−−− Women : Challenger 3; 16 players – $3,000	27–29 May	(Japan) Ryūnosuke Tsukue; 11–4, 11–2, 11–3 (5th PSA title)	(Hong Kong) Tang Ming Hong	(Egypt) Yassin ElShafei (India) Sandeep Ramachandran	(Japan) Yujin Ikeda (India) Rahul Baitha (Egypt) Ziad Ibrahim (Philippines) Robert Garcia
Dynam Cup SQ-Cube Open; Yokohama, Japan; Men : Challenger 5; 16 players – $6,000 −−−−−− Women : Challenger 3; 16 players – $3,000	27–29 May	(Japan) Satomi Watanabe; 11–3, 12–10, 14–12 (7th PSA title)	(Hong Kong) Cheng Nga Ching	(Hong Kong) Heylie Fung (Japan) Akari Midorikawa	(Philippines) Jemyca Aribado (Japan) Ayaka Matsuzawa (Japan) Kozue Onizawa (Japan) Chinatsu Matsui
El Gouna International; El Gouna, Egypt; Men : World Tour Platinum; 48 players – $180,000 −−−−−− Women : World Tour Platinum; 48 players – $180,000	27 May – 3 Jun.	(Egypt) Mostafa Asal; 11–8, 11–9, 11–5 (7th PSA title)	(New Zealand) Paul Coll	(Egypt) Mohamed El Shorbagy (Egypt) Ali Farag	(Peru) Diego Elías (Egypt) Marwan El Shorbagy (Egypt) Fares Dessouky (Egypt) Tarek Momen
El Gouna International; El Gouna, Egypt; Men : World Tour Platinum; 48 players – $180,000 −−−−−− Women : World Tour Platinum; 48 players – $180,000	27 May – 3 Jun.	(Egypt) Hania El Hammamy; 11–2, 11–4, 8–11, 9–11, 4–11 (9th PSA title)	(Egypt) Nouran Gohar	(Egypt) Nour El Sherbini (Egypt) Nour El Tayeb	(New Zealand) Joelle King (England) Sarah-Jane Perry (Malaysia) Sivasangari Subramaniam (Belgium) Tinne Gilis
10th Regatas Resistencia Open; Resistencia, Argentina; Men : Challenger 10; 24 players - $12,000	31 May – 4 Jun.	(Colombia) Ronald Palomino; 11–3, 11–6, 13–11 (3rd PSA title)	(Colombia) Edgar Ramírez	(Germany) Valentin Rapp (Colombia) Andrés Herrera	(Brazil) Guilherme Melo (Belgium) Joeri Hapers (United States) Andrew Douglas (Guatemala) Ricardo Toscano

=== June ===
Tournament	Date	Champion	Runner-Up	Semifinalists	Quarterfinalists
PSA AnyósPark; Anyós, Andorra; Men : Challenger 5; 32 players – $6,000	1–5 June	(Spain) Edmon López; 11–4, 11–7, 11–6 (9th PSA title)	(Argentina) Leandro Romiglio	(Spain) Iván Pérez (Wales) Emyr Evans	(England) Curtis Malik (Italy) Yuri Farneti (Spain) Sergio García (India) Abhay Singh
Assore & Balwin Johannesburg Open; Johannesburg, South Africa; Men : Challenger 3; 16 players – $3,000 −−−−−− Women : Challenger 3; 16 players – $3,000	2–5 June	(South Africa) Dewald van Niekerk; 11–8, 8–11, 11–4, 11–6 (3rd PSA title)	(Iran) Sepehr Etemadpoor	(South Africa) Christo Potgieter (South Africa) Jean-Pierre Brits	(Iran) Sami Ghasedabadi (South Africa) Tristen Worth (Zimbabwe) Blessing Muhwati (South Africa) Ruan Olivier
Assore & Balwin Johannesburg Open; Johannesburg, South Africa; Men : Challenger 3; 16 players – $3,000 −−−−−− Women : Challenger 3; 16 players – $3,000	2–5 June	(South Africa) Cheyna Wood; 12–14, 11–8, 11–6, 11–8 (1st PSA title)	(South Africa) Teagan Roux	(Malaysia) Yasshmita Jadishkumar (South Africa) Mariska Wiese	(South Africa) Jenny Preece (South Africa) Tayla Diepenbroek (Pakistan) Anam Mustafa Aziz (South Africa) Awande Malinga
HydroBlasting Kalgoorlie Golden Open; Kalgoorlie, Australia; Men : Challenger 3; 16 players – $3,000 −−−−−− Women : Challenger 3; 16 players – $3,000	3–5 June	(Australia) Rhys Dowling; 11–9, 6–11, 11–4, 12–10 (4th PSA title)	(Australia) Mike Corren	(India) Jaideep Sethi (Australia) Nicholas Calvert	(Australia) Damon Macmillan (Australia) Oscar Curtis (Singapore) Jerome Aw (Australia) David Ilich
HydroBlasting Kalgoorlie Golden Open; Kalgoorlie, Australia; Men : Challenger 3; 16 players – $3,000 −−−−−− Women : Challenger 3; 16 players – $3,000	3–5 June	(Australia) Erin Classen; 11–6, 11–5, 12–10 (1st PSA title)	(Australia) Hannah Slyth	(Australia) Sophie Fadaely (Australia) Zoe Petrovansky	(England) Tayla Mounter (Singapore) Joannah Yue (Australia) Pascale Louka (Australia) Linda Towill
Necker Mauritius Open; Forbach, Mauritius; Men : World Tour Gold; 24 players – $110,000	7–11 June	(Peru) Diego Elías; 11–2, 11–9, 11–8 (11th PSA title)	(England) Mohamed El Shorbagy	(Egypt) Tarek Momen (New Zealand) Paul Coll	(France) Grégoire Marche (France) Baptiste Masotti (Egypt) Omar Mosaad (Egypt) Mazen Hesham
RMCLUB Women's Open; Forbach, Mauritius; Women : Challenger 30; 24 players – $30,000	7–11 June	(Egypt) Farida Mohamed; 11–7, 6–11, 13–11, 6–11, 11–5 (5th PSA title)	(Belgium) Tinne Gilis	(France) Mélissa Alves (France) Énora Villard	(England) Julianne Courtice (France) Marie Stephan (France) Coline Aumard (Scotland) Lisa Aitken
Enjoy Open-Challenger 3 II; Bielsko-Biała, Poland; Men : Challenger 3; 16 players - $3,000	11–12 June	(Israel) Daniel Poleshchuk; 11–9, 11–7, 11–4 (7th PSA title)	(Spain) Marc López	(Poland) Kajetan Lipski (Poland) Dariusz Filipowski	(Poland) Jakub Gogol (Poland) Paweł Strykowski (Poland) Szymon Papierkowski (Poland) Jakub Pytlowany
Central Open PSA; Whanganui, New Zealand; Men : Challenger 5; 16 players - $6,000	16–18 June	(New Zealand) Lwamba Chileshe; 11–8, 11–8, 11–8 (5th PSA title)	(New Zealand) Evan Williams	(New Zealand) Temwa Chileshe (New Zealand) Zac Millar	(New Zealand) Chris van der Salm (New Zealand) Anthony Lepper (New Zealand) Willz Donnelly (New Zealand) Mason Smales
Abierto Colombiano; La Calera, Colombia; Men : Challenger 5; 24 players – $6,000	15–19 June	(Mexico) Alfredo Ávila; 11–4, 11–1, 6–11, 8–11, 11–9 (15th PSA title)	(Colombia) Ronald Palomino	(Guatemala) Alejandro Enríquez (Colombia) Andrés Herrera	(Colombia) Juan Pablo Gómez (Paraguay) Francesco Marcantonio (Colombia) Matías Knudsen (Colombia) Juan José Torres
South Australian Open; Adelaide, Australia; Men : WSF & PSA Satellite; 16 players - $2,000 −−−−−− Women : WSF & PSA Satellite; 16 players – $2,000	17–19 June	(Australia) Mike Corren; 11–9, 11–7, 5–11, 11–9	(Australia) Tate Norris	(Australia) Dylan Molinaro (Australia) Jamie Pattison	(Australia) Curtis Hall (Australia) Javed Ali (India) Jaideep Sethi (Australia) Will Gray
South Australian Open; Adelaide, Australia; Men : WSF & PSA Satellite; 16 players - $2,000 −−−−−− Women : WSF & PSA Satellite; 16 players – $2,000	17–19 June	(Australia) Alex Haydon; 11–8, 11–6, 11–8	(Australia) Sophie Fadaely	(Australia) Grace Pattison (Australia) Amelie Guziak	(Australia) Alison Skinner (Australia) Dakshyani Muniandy (Canada) Pooja Chugh (Australia) Katlyn Hall
QSF No.4; Doha, Qatar; Men : Challenger 30; 24 players – $30,000	20–24 June	(France) Victor Crouin; 11–5, 9–11, 19–17, 12–10 (16th PSA title)	(Mexico) Leonel Cárdenas	(Egypt) Aly Abou Eleinen (India) Ramit Tandon	(Egypt) Omar Mosaad (Egypt) Karim El Hammamy (Egypt) Mazen Gamal (Pakistan) Tayyab Aslam
Carey Olsen Tortola Classic; Road Town, British Virgin Islands; Men : Challenger 10; 24 players - $12,000	21–25 June	(Hungary) Balázs Farkas; 8–11, 8–11, 11–4, 11–7, 11–4 (9th PSA title)	(Canada) David Baillargeon	(United States) Andrew Douglas (Belgium) Joeri Hapers	(Jamaica) Christopher Binnie (Canada) Liam Marrison (England) Simon Herbert (United States) Spencer Lovejoy
CIB PSA World Tour Finals; Cairo, Egypt; Men : World Tour Finals; 8 players – $200,000 – Draw −−−−−− Women : World Tour Finals; 8 players – $200,000 – Draw	21–26 June	(Egypt) Mostafa Asal; 13–11, 11–8, 11–7 (2nd PSA Finals title) (8th PSA title)	(New Zealand) Paul Coll	(England) Mohamed El Shorbagy (Egypt) Ali Farag	
CIB PSA World Tour Finals; Cairo, Egypt; Men : World Tour Finals; 8 players – $200,000 – Draw −−−−−− Women : World Tour Finals; 8 players – $200,000 – Draw	21–26 June	(Egypt) Nour El Sherbini; 11–6, 11–8, 11–5 (2nd PSA Finals title) (30th PSA title)	(Egypt) Nouran Gohar	(Egypt) Hania El Hammamy (United States) Amanda Sobhy	
Tournoi National des Volcans; Clermont-Ferrand, France; Men : WSF & PSA Satellite; 16 players – $2,500	25–26 June	(France) Macéo Lévy; 11–6, 11–9, 6–11, 11–8	(France) Manuel Paquemar	(France) Melvil Scianimanico (France) Grégory Malsang	(France) Kevin Noirot (France) Antoine Riehl (France) Matthieu Benoît (France) Matteo Carrouget
Tuanku Muhriz Trophy; Seremban, Malaysia; Men : Challenger 10; 24 players - $12,000 −−−−−− Women : Challenger 10; 24 players - $12,000	28 Jun. – 2 Jul.	(India) Abhay Singh; 13–11, 6–11, 11–5, 4–11, 13–11 (2nd PSA title)	(Malaysia) Ivan Yuen	(Pakistan) Amaad Fareed (Malaysia) Sanjay Jeeva	(Pakistan) Tayyab Aslam (Malaysia) Mohd Syafiq Kamal (Egypt) Abdallah Elmasry (Malaysia) Addeen Idrakie
Tuanku Muhriz Trophy; Seremban, Malaysia; Men : Challenger 10; 24 players - $12,000 −−−−−− Women : Challenger 10; 24 players - $12,000	28 Jun. – 2 Jul.	(Malaysia) Aira Azman; 8–11, 11–7, 11–4, 12–10 (1st PSA title)	(Egypt) Salma El Tayeb	(Egypt) Malak Khafagy (Malaysia) Ainaa Amani	(Egypt) Nour Heikal (Malaysia) Yasshmita Jadishkumar (Egypt) Nardine Garas (Malaysia) Yee Xin Ying
Carlisle Squash Club Open; Carlisle, England; Men : Challenger 5; 16 players – $6,000	29 Jun. – 2 Jul.	(Spain) Iván Pérez; 11–3, 7–11, 6–11, 11–8, 11–3 (3rd PSA title)	(England) Ben Smith	(Wales) Elliott Morris Devred (New Zealand) Joel Arscott	(Wales) Owain Taylor (Japan) Ryūnosuke Tsukue (England) James Peach (Jamaica) Christopher Binnie
Women's Austrian Open; Salzburg, Austria; Women : Challenger 3; 16 players – $3,000	30 Jun. – 2 Jul.	(Switzerland) Céline Walser; 9–11, 11–9, 11–5, 13–11 (1st PSA title)	(Germany) Katerina Týcová	(Germany) Saskia Beinhard (France) Taba Taghavi	(Austria) Jacqueline Peychär (France) Ella Gálová (France) Léa Barbeau (Germany) Aylin Günsav
HSC Open; Houston, United States; Men : Challenger 5; 24 players – $6,000	29 Jun. – 3 Jul.	(Mexico) Arturo Salazar; 11–3, 11–9, 11–9 (12th PSA title)	(Mexico) Alfredo Ávila	(India) Abhishek Agarwal (Mexico) Alejandro Reyes	(Mexico) Allan Núñez (Pakistan) Huzaifa Ibrahim (Pakistan) Waqas Mehboob (Argentina) Jeremías Azaña
Hove Ampito Squash Open; Hove, England; Men : Challenger 10; 16 players - $12,000 −−−−−− Women : Challenger 5; 16 players - $6,000	30 Jun. – 3 Jul.	(England) Curtis Malik; 2–11, 8–11, 11–9, 11–9, 11–4 (5th PSA title)	(England) Ben Coleman	(England) Simon Herbert (England) Charlie Lee	(England) Joe Lee (Wales) Emyr Evans (Egypt) Mazen Gamal (England) Tom Walsh
Hove Ampito Squash Open; Hove, England; Men : Challenger 10; 16 players - $12,000 −−−−−− Women : Challenger 5; 16 players - $6,000	30 Jun. – 3 Jul.	(Egypt) Zeina Zein; 11–9, 11–7, 11–8 (1st PSA title)	(England) Torrie Malik	(Egypt) Rana Ismail (Egypt) Menna Walid	(Hong Kong) Cheng Nga Ching (England) Saran Nghiem (England) Asia Harris (England) Kiera Marshall
City of Greater Bendigo International; Bendigo, Australia; Men : Challenger 3; 16 players - $3,000 −−−−−− Women : Challenger 3; 16 players - $3,000	30 Jun. – 3 Jul.	(Malaysia) Bryan Lim Tze Kang; 11–7, 12–10, 11–4 (3rd PSA title)	(Australia) Joseph White	(Hong Kong) Andes Ling (Australia) Rhys Dowling	(Hong Kong) Ho Ka Hei (Hong Kong) Lam Shing Fung (Singapore) Aaron Liang (France) Laouenan Loaëc
City of Greater Bendigo International; Bendigo, Australia; Men : Challenger 3; 16 players - $3,000 −−−−−− Women : Challenger 3; 16 players - $3,000	30 Jun. – 3 Jul.	(Japan) Akari Midorikawa; 10–12, 11–6, 11–5, 11–6 (2nd PSA title)	(South Korea) Heo Min-gyeong	(Hong Kong) Wai Sze Wing (Hong Kong) Lam Po Ying	(Australia) Sarah Cardwell (South Korea) Choe Yu-ra (Australia) Lee Sze Yu (Australia) Jennifer Condie

=== July ===
Tournament	Date	Champion	Runner-Up	Semifinalists	Quarterfinalists
Men's Austrian Open; Salzburg, Austria; Men : Challenger 5; 16 players - $6,000	6–9 July	(England) James Peach; 4–11, 11–9, 11–5, 10–12, 11–7 (2nd PSA title)	(Switzerland) Yannick Wilhelmi	(Germany) Yannik Omlor (Austria) Aqeel Rehman	(Spain) Sergio García (Switzerland) Robin Gadola (Jamaica) Christopher Binnie (Brazil) Diego Gobbi
Berkhamsted Linksap Open; Berkhamsted, England; Men : Challenger 10; 16 players – $12,000 −−−−−− Women : Challenger 10; 16 players – $12,000	7–10 July	(England) Joe Lee; 12–10, 11–4, 11–9 (8th PSA title)	(Scotland) Rory Stewart	(Egypt) Mazen Gamal (England) Ben Smith	(England) Curtis Malik (England) Ben Coleman (Israel) Daniel Poleshchuk (Wales) Emyr Evans
Berkhamsted Linksap Open; Berkhamsted, England; Men : Challenger 10; 16 players – $12,000 −−−−−− Women : Challenger 10; 16 players – $12,000	7–10 July	(England) Grace Gear; 5–11, 11–7, 11–5, 6–11, 11–5 (3rd PSA title)	(Egypt) Zeina Zein	(Egypt) Rana Ismail (England) Anna Kimberley	(England) Torrie Malik (England) Millie Tomlinson (Scotland) Alison Thomson (England) Emma Bartley
City of Greater Shepparton International; Shepparton, Australia; Men : Challenger 3; 16 players - $3,000 −−−−−− Women : Challenger 3; 16 players - $3,000	7–10 July	(Malaysia) Hafiz Zhafri; 11–9, 11–9, 11–4 (1st PSA title)	(Hong Kong) Lam Shing Fung	(Hong Kong) Andes Ling (Hong Kong) Ho Ka Hei	(France) Laouenan Loaëc (Egypt) Shady El Sherbiny (Singapore) Aaron Liang (India) Navaneeth Prabhu
City of Greater Shepparton International; Shepparton, Australia; Men : Challenger 3; 16 players - $3,000 −−−−−− Women : Challenger 3; 16 players - $3,000	7–10 July	(Hong Kong) Toby Tse; 11–6, 12–10, 11–6 (1st PSA title)	(Australia) Sarah Cardwell	(Hong Kong) Wai Sze Wing (Japan) Akari Midorikawa	(Malaysia) Yasshmita Jadishkumar (England) Ellie Jones (South Korea) Heo Min-gyeong (Australia) Jennifer Condie
Gibraltar Open; Gibraltar; Men : Challenger 5; 16 players - $6,000 −−−−−− Women : Challenger 5; 16 players - $6,000	13–16 July	(Spain) Edmon López; 11–6, 6–11, 11–1, 11–3 (10th PSA title)	(England) James Peach	(Wales) Elliott Morris Devred (England) Ben Smith	(Spain) Iván Pérez (Austria) Aqeel Rehman (England) Stuart MacGregor (Belgium) Joeri Hapers
Gibraltar Open; Gibraltar; Men : Challenger 5; 16 players - $6,000 −−−−−− Women : Challenger 5; 16 players - $6,000	13–16 July	(Egypt) Rana Ismail; 11–7, 11–7, 11–5 (1st PSA title)	(Spain) Marta Domínguez	(Egypt) Nadeen Kotb (England) Katie Wells	(United States) Caroline Fouts (England) Saran Nghiem (England) Kiera Marshall (Scotland) Alison Thomson
Life Time Optimus BT Johns Creek Open; Johns Creek, United States; Men : Challenger 10; 24 players – $12,000	13–17 July	(Mexico) Arturo Salazar; 11–4, 1–11, 11–9, 11–7 (13th PSA title)	(Mexico) Alfredo Ávila	(Japan) Ryūnosuke Tsukue (England) Sam Todd	(Jamaica) Christopher Binnie (Pakistan) Farhan Hashmi (Colombia) Edgar Ramírez (Canada) Michael McCue
Victorian Open; Wheelers Hill, Australia; Men : Challenger 5; 24 players - $6,000 ------ Women : Challenger 5; 24 players - $6,000	13–17 July	(Australia) Rex Hedrick; 11–6, 11–4, 11–2 (19th PSA title)	(New Zealand) Lwamba Chileshe	(Malaysia) Bryan Lim Tze Kang (New Zealand) Temwa Chileshe	(Hong Kong) Ho Ka Hei (Australia) Nicholas Calvert (Japan) Tomotaka Endo (Malaysia) Hafiz Zhafri
Victorian Open; Wheelers Hill, Australia; Men : Challenger 5; 24 players - $6,000 ------ Women : Challenger 5; 24 players - $6,000	13–17 July	(Japan) Akari Midorikawa; 11–9, 9–11, 11–6, 11–9 (3rd PSA title)	(Malaysia) Yasshmita Jadishkumar	(Hong Kong) Wai Sze Wing (Hong Kong) Toby Tse	(South Korea) Choe Yu-ra (Hong Kong) Lam Po Ying (Australia) Sarah Cardwell (England) Ellie Jones
Schräglage Squash Open; Böblingen, Germany; Men : Challenger 5; 32 players – $6,000 −−−−−− Women : Challenger 3; 16 players – $3,000	21–24 July	(Austria) Aqeel Rehman; 11–9, 11–7, 9–11, 11–5 (12th PSA title)	(England) Stuart MacGregor	(Czech Republic) Viktor Byrtus (Egypt) Yassin ElShafei	(Germany) Valentin Rapp (Egypt) Ziad Ibrahim (Switzerland) Robin Gadola (Wales) Elliott Morris Devred
Schräglage Squash Open; Böblingen, Germany; Men : Challenger 5; 32 players – $6,000 −−−−−− Women : Challenger 3; 16 players – $3,000	21–24 July	(Germany) Saskia Beinhard; 11–8, 10–12, 11–6, 4–11, 11–3 (2nd PSA title)	(Germany) Katerina Týcová	(England) Alicia Mead (England) Katie Wells	(Austria) Jacqueline Peychär (Switzerland) Nadia Pfister (Spain) Sofía Mateos (England) Polly Clark
The Northern Joe Cup; Manchester, England; Men : Challenger 5; 24 players – $6,000 −−−−−− Women : Challenger 5; 24 players – $6,000	29 Jul. – 2 Aug.	(England) Curtis Malik; 11–8, 11–5, 11–8 (6th PSA title)	(Wales) Elliott Morris Devred	(England) Finnlay Withington (Scotland) Alasdair Prott	(Czech Republic) Marek Panáček (England) Stuart MacGregor (Brazil) Vini Rodrigues (England) Ben Smith
The Northern Joe Cup; Manchester, England; Men : Challenger 5; 24 players – $6,000 −−−−−− Women : Challenger 5; 24 players – $6,000	29 Jul. – 2 Aug.	(England) Saran Nghiem; 10–12, 5–11, 11–6, 11–9, 11–9 (1st PSA title)	(England) Torrie Malik	(England) Millie Tomlinson (Scotland) Alison Thomson	(Wales) Lowri Roberts (England) Katie Wells (England) Polly Clark (England) Asia Harris

== Statistical information ==
The players/nations are sorted by:

1. Total number of titles;
2. Cumulated importance of those titles;
3. Alphabetical order (by family names for players).

=== Key ===
World Championship
World Tour Platinum
World Tour Gold
World Tour Silver
World Tour Bronze
Challenger Tour 5/10/20/30

=== Titles won by player (men's) ===
Total	Player	World Ch. / PSA Finals	Platinum	Gold	Silver	Bronze	Challenger 30	Challenger 20	Challenger 10	Challenger 5	Challenger 3
7	Moustafa El Sirty (EGY)						●	●●	●●●	●	
7	Nick Wall (ENG)								●●	●●●●	●
6	Ali Farag (EGY)	●	●	●●●●							
6	Curtis Malik (ENG)								●●	●●	●●
5	Paul Coll (NZL)		●●●	●●							
4	Diego Elías (PER)		●	●	●●						
3	Mostafa Asal (EGY)	●	●●								
3	Victor Crouin (FRA)						●	●●			
3	Auguste Dussourd (FRA)								●●●		
3	Ivan Yuen (MYS)								●●●		
3	David Baillargeon (CAN)								●●	●	
3	Yahya Elnawasany (EGY)								●●	●	
3	Balázs Farkas (HUN)								●●	●	
3	Asim Khan (PAK)								●●	●	
3	Rory Stewart (SCO)								●	●●	
3	Leandro Romiglio (ARG)								●	●	●
3	Alfredo Ávila (MEX)									●●●	
3	Edmon López (ESP)									●●●	
3	Sam Todd (ENG)									●●●	
3	Ryūnosuke Tsukue (JPN)									●●●	
3	Lwamba Chileshe (NZL)									●●	●
2	Abdulla Al-Tamimi (QAT)							●	●		
2	Leonel Cárdenas (MEX)								●●		
2	Andrew Douglas (USA)								●●		
2	Nathan Lake (ENG)								●●		
2	Charlie Lee (ENG)								●●		
2	Ronald Palomino (COL)								●●		
2	Sébastien Bonmalais (FRA)								●	●	
2	Rex Hedrick (AUS)								●	●	
2	Arturo Salazar (MEX)								●	●	
2	Velavan Senthilkumar (IND)								●	●	
2	Abhay Singh (IND)								●	●	
2	Juan Camilo Vargas (COL)								●	●	
2	Yassin ElShafei (EGY)									●●	
2	Iván Pérez (ESP)									●●	
2	Sandeep Ramachandran (IND)									●●	
2	Simon Herbert (ENG)									●	●
2	James Peach (ENG)									●	●
2	Rhys Dowling (AUS)										●●
2	Daniel Poleshchuk (ISR)										●●
2	Alireza Shameli (IRI)										●●
2	Tom Walsh (ENG)										●●
1	Fares Dessouky (EGY)			●							
1	Joel Makin (WAL)				●						
1	Mohamed El Shorbagy (EGY)					●					
1	Karim Abdel Gawad (EGY)					●					
1	Saurav Ghosal (IND)					●					
1	Greg Lobban (SCO)						●				
1	Adrian Waller (ENG)						●				
1	Karim El Hammamy (EGY)							●			
1	Nicolas Müller (SUI)							●			
1	James Willstrop (ENG)							●			
1	Tayyab Aslam (PAK)								●		
1	Benjamin Aubert (FRA)								●		
1	Timothy Brownell (USA)								●		
1	Richie Fallows (ENG)								●		
1	Mazen Gamal (EGY)								●		
1	Nasir Iqbal (PAK)								●		
1	Bernat Jaume (ESP)								●		
1	Joe Lee (ENG)								●		
1	Guilherme Melo (BRA)								●		
1	Iker Pajares (ESP)								●		
1	Marwan Tarek (EGY)								●		
1	Wong Chi Him (HKG)									●	
1	Robert Downer (ENG)									●	
1	Ibrahim Elkabbani (EGY)									●	
1	Josué Enríquez (GUA)									●	
1	Aly Hussein (EGY)									●	
1	Harley Lam (HKG)									●	
1	Farhan Mehboob (PAK)									●	
1	Daniel Mekbib (CZE)									●	
1	Darren Rahul Pragasam (MYS)									●	
1	Aqeel Rehman (AUT)									●	
1	Nick Sachvie (CAN)									●	
1	Rui Soares (POR)									●	
1	Valeriy Fedoruk (UKR)										●
1	Alejandro Enríquez (GUA)										●
1	Diego Gobbi (BRA)										●
1	Tang Ming Hong (HKG)										●
1	Stuart MacGregor (ENG)										●
1	Miguel Pujol (ARG)										●
1	Ben Smith (ENG)										●
1	Martin Švec (CZE)										●
1	Vladislav Titov (RUS)										●
1	Bryan Lim Tze Kang (MYS)										●
1	Dewald van Niekerk (RSA)										●
1	Hugo Varela (ESP)										●
1	Yannick Wilhelmi (SUI)										●
1	Hafiz Zhafri (MYS)										●

=== Titles won by nation (men's) ===
Total	Nation	World Ch. / PSA Finals	Platinum	Gold	Silver	Bronze	Challenger 30	Challenger 20	Challenger 10	Challenger 5	Challenger 3
33	England (ENG)						●	●	●●●●●●●●●●	●●●●●●●●●●●●	●●●●●●●●●
29	Egypt (EGY)	●●	●●●	●●●●●		●●	●	●●●	●●●●●●●	●●●●●●	
9	France (FRA)						●	●●	●●●●●	●	
8	New Zealand (NZL)		●●●	●●						●●	●
8	Spain (ESP)								●●	●●●●●	●
7	India (IND)					●			●●	●●●●	
7	Mexico (MEX)								●●●	●●●●	
6	Pakistan (PAK)								●●●●	●●	
6	Malaysia (MYS)								●●●	●	●●
4	Peru (PER)		●	●	●●						
4	Scotland (SCO)						●		●	●●	
4	Colombia (COL)								●●●	●	
4	Canada (CAN)								●●	●●	
4	Argentina (ARG)								●	●	●●
4	Australia (AUS)								●	●	●●
3	United States (USA)								●●●		
3	Hungary (HUN)								●●	●	
3	Japan (JPN)									●●●	
3	Hong Kong (HKG)									●●	●
2	Qatar (QAT)							●	●		
2	Switzerland (SUI)							●			●
2	Brazil (BRA)								●		●
2	Czech Republic (CZE)									●	●
2	Guatemala (GUA)									●	●
2	Iran (IRI)										●●
2	Israel (ISR)										●●
1	Wales (WAL)				●						
1	Austria (AUT)									●	
1	Portugal (POR)									●	
1	Russia (RUS)										●
1	South Africa (RSA)										●
1	Ukraine (UKR)										●

=== Titles won by player (women's) ===
Total	Player	World Ch. / PSA Finals	Platinum	Gold	Silver	Bronze	Challenger 30	Challenger 20	Challenger 10	Challenger 5	Challenger 3
7	Nouran Gohar (EGY)		●●●●	●		●●					
5	Nour El Sherbini (EGY)	●●	●	●		●					
5	Satomi Watanabe (JPN)								●	●●	●●
4	Georgina Kennedy (ENG)					●		●	●●		
4	Lily Taylor (ENG)									●●●	●
3	Hania El Hammamy (EGY)		●●		●						
3	Aifa Azman (MYS)					●			●●		
3	Grace Gear (ENG)								●●	●	
3	Georgia Adderley (SCO)									●●●	
3	Akari Midorikawa (JPN)									●	●●
2	Tinne Gilis (BEL)						●●				
2	Nour Aboulmakarim (EGY)							●		●	
2	Lucy Beecroft (ENG)								●●		
2	Jasmine Hutton (ENG)								●●		
2	Tanvi Khanna (IND)								●●		
2	Chan Sin Yuk (HKG)								●●		
2	Cindy Merlo (SUI)								●		●
2	Cheng Nga Ching (HKG)									●●	
2	Marta Domínguez (ESP)									●	●
2	Alison Thomson (SCO)									●	●
2	Varvara Esina (RUS)										●●
1	Amanda Sobhy (USA)			●							
1	Joelle King (NZL)				●						
1	Rowan Elaraby (EGY)					●					
1	Farida Mohamed (EGY)						●				
1	Nada Abbas (EGY)							●			
1	Hana Moataz (EGY)							●			
1	Hana Ramadan (EGY)							●			
1	Ho Tze-Lok (HKG)							●			
1	Emily Whitlock (WAL)							●			
1	Aira Azman (MYS)								●		
1	Rachel Arnold (MYS)								●		
1	Kenzy Ayman (EGY)								●		
1	Salma El Tayeb (EGY)								●		
1	Olivia Fiechter (USA)								●		
1	Alexandra Fuller (RSA)								●		
1	Rachael Grinham (AUS)								●		
1	Danielle Letourneau (CAN)								●		
1	Lucy Turmel (ENG)								●		
1	Nour Heikal (EGY)									●	
1	Rana Ismail (EGY)									●	
1	Wen Li Lai (MYS)									●	
1	Katie Malliff (ENG)									●	
1	Alicia Mead (ENG)									●	
1	Saran Nghiem (ENG)									●	
1	Akanksha Salunkhe (IND)									●	
1	Milou van der Heijden (NED)									●	
1	Chan Yiwen (MYS)									●	
1	Zeina Zein (EGY)									●	
1	Alesya Aleshina (RUS)										●
1	Saskia Beinhard (GER)										●
1	Erin Classen (AUS)										●
1	Hannah Chukwu (HUN)										●
1	Lana Harrison (NZL)										●
1	Marina Stefanoni (USA)										●
1	Laura Tovar (COL)										●
1	Toby Tse (HKG)										●
1	Céline Walser (SUI)										●
1	Cheyna Wood (RSA)										●

=== Titles won by nation (women's) ===
Total	Nation	World Ch. / PSA Finals	Platinum	Gold	Silver	Bronze	Challenger 30	Challenger 20	Challenger 10	Challenger 5	Challenger 3
27	Egypt (EGY)	●●	●●●●●●●	●●	●	●●●●	●	●●●●	●●	●●●●	
18	England (ENG)					●		●	●●●●●●●●	●●●●●●●	●
8	Japan (JPN)								●	●●●	●●●●
7	Malaysia (MYS)					●			●●●●	●●	
6	Hong Kong (HKG)							●	●●	●●	●
5	Scotland (SCO)									●●●●	●
3	United States (USA)			●					●		●
3	India (IND)								●●	●	
3	Switzerland (SUI)								●		●●
3	Russia (RUS)										●●●
2	New Zealand (NZL)				●						●
2	Belgium (BEL)						●●				
2	Australia (AUS)								●		●
2	South Africa (RSA)								●		●
2	Spain (ESP)									●	●
1	Wales (WAL)							●			
1	Canada (CAN)								●		
1	Netherlands (NED)									●	
1	Germany (GER)										●
1	Colombia (COL)										●
1	Hungary (HUN)										●

=== World Championship qualifiers ===
Winners of a select group of PSA Challenger Tour tournaments chosen by PSA receive a wildcard for the Men's and Women's World Championships. The qualified players are:

Player	Date	Tournament	Tier
Balázs Farkas (HUN)	5 March 2022	Odense Open	PSA Challenger Tour 10
Alexandra Fuller (RSA)	5 March 2022	Odense Open	PSA Challenger Tour 10
Leandro Romiglio (ARG)	20 March 2022	PSA Val-de-Reuil Normandie	PSA Challenger Tour 5
Katie Malliff (ENG)	20 March 2022	PSA Val-de-Reuil Normandie	PSA Challenger Tour 5
Ibrahim Elkabbani (EGY)	9 April 2022	University of Birmingham Open	PSA Challenger Tour 5
Satomi Watanabe (JPN)	9 April 2022	University of Birmingham Open	PSA Challenger Tour 5
Juan Camilo Vargas (COL)	7 May 2022	Bermuda Open	PSA Challenger Tour 10
Kenzy Ayman (EGY)	7 May 2022	Bermuda Open	PSA Challenger Tour 10

== Comebacks ==
- (Egypt) Nour El Tayeb

== Retirements ==
Following is a list of notable players (winners of a main tour title, and/or part of the PSA Men's World Rankings and Women's World Rankings top 30 for at least one month) who announced their retirement from professional squash, became inactive, or were permanently banned from playing, during the 2021–22 season:

- (France) Grégory Gaultier
- (England) Alison Waters
- (France) Coline Aumard
- (England) Tom Richards
- (France) Camille Serme

== Current world top 10 players ==
=== Men's world ranking ===
PSA Men's World Rankings as of 1 September 2025
Rank	Player	Points	Move^{†}
1	Mostafa Asal (EGY)	2,338	Steady
2	Diego Elías (PER)	1,631	Steady
3	Paul Coll (NZL)	1,153	Steady
4	Joel Makin (WAL)	1,096	Steady
5	Marwan Elshorbagy (ENG)	847	Steady
6	Karim Gawad (EGY)	811	Steady
7	Mohamed Elshorbagy (ENG)	794	Steady
8	Youssef Soliman (EGY)	616	Steady
9	Aly Abou Eleinen (EGY)	580	Steady
10	Youssef Ibrahim (EGY)	578	Steady

=== Women's world ranking ===
PSA Women's World Rankings, of the 5 January 2026
Rank	Player	Average	Move^{†}
1	Hania El Hammamy (EGY)	1,791	Steady
2	Nouran Gohar (EGY)	1,578	Steady
3	Amina Orfi (EGY)	1,455	Steady
4	Nour El Sherbini (EGY)	1,324	Steady
5	Olivia Weaver (USA)	1,284	Steady
6	Satomi Watanabe (JPN)	881	Steady
7	Sivasangari Subramaniam (MAS)	869	Steady
8	Tinne Gilis (BEL)	755	Steady
9	Fayrouz Aboelkheir (EGY)	753	Steady
10	Georgina Kennedy (ENG)	741	Steady

== See also ==
- 2021–22 PSA World Tour Finals
- 2022 Men's PSA World Tour Finals
- 2022 Women's PSA World Tour Finals
- 2022 in squash
