= British Junior Open Squash 2013 =

BJO 2013

Details
- Event name: British Junior Open 2013
- Location: Sheffield, England
- Venue: Hallamshire Squash Club; Abbeydale Park Club; Fulwood Sports Club
- Website squashsite.co.uk/bjo/today13.htm

The British Junior Open 2013 is the edition of the 2013's British Junior Open Squash, which is a World Junior Squash Circuit event Tier 2. The event took place in Sheffield in England from 2 to 6 January.

== Draw and results ==
Restricted from the quarter-final

=== Under 19 ===
==== Boys Under 19 ====
Quarter finals
1	(Egypt) Mazen Hesham	6	11	11	11
5/8	(Egypt) Moustafa Bayoumy	11	3	9	7
3/4	(India) Mahesh Mangaonkar	9	11	11	11
5/8	(Egypt) Shebab Essam	11	4	4	9
5/8	(England) Ollie Holland	5	12	11	9	8
3/4	(Egypt) Karim El Hammamy	11	10	4	11	11
(England) Richie Fallows	6	6	7
2	(Egypt) Fares Dessouky	11	11	11

Semi-finals
1	(Egypt) Mazen Hesham	11	11	11
3/4	(India) Mahesh Mangaonkar	4	9	8
3/4	(Egypt) Karim El Hammamy	12	8	4	9
2	(Egypt) Fares Dessouky	10	11	11	11

Final
1	(Egypt) Mazen Hesham	14	5	8	11	6
2	(Egypt) Fares Dessouky	12	11	11	6	11

==== Girls Under 19 ====
Quarter finals
1	(England) Emily Whitlock	11	11	11
5/8	(Egypt) Aya Esmat Youssef	7	3	2
9/16	(India) Aparajitha Balamurukan	12	11	9	3	9
5/8	(England) Victoria Temple-Murray	10	8	11	11	11
5/8	(United States) Sabrina Sobhy	13	8	9	7
3/4	(Egypt) Nouran Ahmed Gohar	11	11	11	11
5/8	(India) Lakshya Ragavendran	5	9	7
2	(Egypt) Mariam Ibrahim Metwally	11	11	11

Semi-finals
1	(England) Emily Whitlock	11	11	11
5/8	(England) Victoria Temple-Murray	2	3	9
3/4	(Egypt) Nouran Ahmed Gohar	12	11	11
2	(Egypt) Mariam Ibrahim Metwally	10	7	2

Final
1	(England) Emily Whitlock	8	11	11	11
3/4	(Egypt) Nouran Ahmed Gohar	11	9	4	7

=== Under 17 ===
==== Boys Under 17 ====
Quarter finals
1	(Egypt) Omar El Atmas	12	11	9	10	4
5/8	(Peru) Diego Elías	10	9	11	12	11
3/4	(Egypt) Yossef El Makarem	11	11	11
5/8	(England) George Parker	9	9	8
5/8	(Malaysia) Mohd Syafiq Kamal	3	13	9	8
3/4	(India) Kush Kumar	11	11	11	11
5/8	(Israel) Daniel Poleshchuk	5	8	5
2	(Egypt) Mohamed El Gawarhy	11	11	11

Semi-finals
5/8	(Peru) Diego Elías	10	11	9	11	12
3/4	(Egypt) Yossef El Makarem	12	5	11	6	10
3/4	(India) Kush Kumar	7	7	3
2	(Egypt) Mohamed El Gawarhy	11	11	11

Final
5/8	(Peru) Diego Elías	6	12	7	11	11
2	(Egypt) Mohamed El Gawarhy	11	10	11	5	9

==== Girls Under 17 ====
Quarter finals
1	(Egypt) Yathreb Adel	11	11	11
5/8	(France) Marie Stephan	2	7	2
3/4	(England) Lucy Beecroft	6	2	9
5/8	(Egypt) Hana Ramadan	11	11	11
5/8	(Egypt) Mayar Hany Mohamed	11	10	7	11	8
3/4	(Belgium) Nele Gilis	9	12	11	2	11
5/8	(Egypt) Nadine Ayman Shahin	7	4	5
2	(Egypt) Salma Hany Ibrahim	11	11	11

Semi-finals
1	(Egypt) Yathreb Adel	11	11	12
5/8	(Egypt) Hana Ramadan	8	7	10
3/4	(Belgium) Nele Gilis	4	6	11
2	(Egypt) Salma Hany Ibrahim	11	11	13

Final
1	(Egypt) Yathreb Adel	11	11	6	12
2	(Egypt) Salma Hany Ibrahim	8	9	11	10

=== Under 15 ===
==== Boys Under 15 ====
Quarter finals
1	(Malaysia) Ng Eain Yow	11	11	11
5/8	(Egypt) Blal Nawar	4	0	5
3/4	(Egypt) Saad El Din Ihab	4	11	12	11
9/16	(United States) David Yacobucci	11	4	10	6
5/8	(Egypt) Karim Magdy	11	11	11
9/16	(England) Kyle Finch	3	7	6
9/16	(India) Velavan Senthilkumar	10	12	6	8
2	(Jordan) Mohammad Al Saraj	12	10	11	11

Semi-finals
1	(Malaysia) Ng Eain Yow	11	11	11
3/4	(Egypt) Saad El Din Ihab	9	5	7
5/8	(Egypt) Karim Magdy	11	4	2	2
2	(Jordan) Mohammad Al Saraj	8	11	11	11

Final
1	(Malaysia) Ng Eain Yow	11	11	11
2	(Jordan) Mohammad Al Saraj	1	6	7

==== Girls Under 15 ====
Quarter finals
1	(Egypt) Habiba Mohamed	11	11	11
5/8	(Malaysia) Zoe Foo	5	1	1
3/4	(Egypt) Salma Tarek	11	9	6	9
9/16	(Spain) Cristina Gómez	8	11	11	11
9/16	(England) Anoushka Wooller	5	0	0
3/4	(Malaysia) Sivasang. Subramaniam	11	11	11
9/16	(Egypt) Mennat Hamed	11	11	11	14
2	(Egypt) Nadin Hisham	13	2	9	12

Semi-finals
1	(Egypt) Habiba Mohamed	11	11	11
9/16	(Spain) Cristina Gómez	3	6	6
3/4	(Malaysia) Sivasang. Subramaniam	9	11	11	5	11
9/16	(Egypt) Mennat Hamed	11	8	9	11	6

Final
1	(Egypt) Habiba Mohamed	11	11	14
3/4	(Malaysia) Sivasang. Subramaniam	8	6	12

=== Under 13 ===
==== Boys Under 13 ====
Quarter finals
1	(Egypt) Marwan Tarek	11	11	11
9/16	(Egypt) Aly Hussein	3	3	3
3/4	(France) Pierre-Louis Riff	6	4	7
5/8	(Egypt) Yehia El Nawasany	11	11	11
9/16	(England) Ben Merchant	5	8	3
3/4	(Egypt) Ahmed Maged	11	11	11
(Mexico) Leonel Cárdenas	6	5	4
2	(Egypt) Mohamed El Shamy	11	11	11

Semi-finals
1	(Egypt) Marwan Tarek	11	11	11
5/8	(Egypt) Yehia El Nawasany	5	5	4
3/4	(Egypt) Ahmed Maged	11	11	3	9	1
2	(Egypt) Mohamed El Shamy	7	6	11	11	11

Final
1	(Egypt) Marwan Tarek	14	4	11	9	11
2	(Egypt) Mohamed El Shamy	12	11	7	11	13

==== Girls Under 13 ====
Quarter finals
1	(Egypt) Hania El Hammamy	11	11	11
5/8	(Ukraine) Nadiia Usenko	3	2	5
3/4	(Egypt) Amina Yousry	11	11	11
5/8	(Malaysia) Nur Aliah Anis	4	4	3
5/8	(Egypt) Hana Ayoub	11	11	11
3/4	(England) Elize Lazarus	3	6	5
5/8	(Egypt) Nada Abbas	8	1	7
2	(Egypt) Rowan Reda	11	11	11

Semi-finals
1	(Egypt) Hania El Hammamy	11	11	11
3/4	(Egypt) Amina Yousry	4	5	5
5/8	(Egypt) Hana Ayoub	6	6	8
2	(Egypt) Rowan Reda	11	11	11

Final
1	(Egypt) Hania El Hammamy	11	11	11
2	(Egypt) Rowan Reda	8	5	3

== See also ==
- British Junior Open
- 2013 Men's World Junior Squash Championships
- 2013 Women's World Junior Squash Championships
- World Junior Squash Circuit
