= British Junior Open Squash 2015 =

BJO 2015

Details
- Event name: British Junior Open 2015
- Location: Sheffield, England
- Venue: Hallamshire Squash Club; Abbeydale Park Club; Fulwood Sports Club
- Website squashsite.co.uk/bjo/

The British Junior Open 2015 is the 2015 edition of the British Junior Open for Squash, which is a World Junior Squash Circuit event Tier 2. The event took place in Sheffield in England from 2 to 6 January.

== Draw and results ==
Restricted from the quarter final

=== Under 19 ===
==== Boys Under 19 ====
Quarter finals
1	(Peru) Diego Elías	11	11	11
5/8	(Egypt) Youssef Soliman	3	3	3
3/4	(England) George Parker	11	7	11	11
5/8	(Egypt) Youssef Abo Elmakarem	8	11	6	8
9/16	(Egypt) Amr Arafa	9	11	11	5	13
3/4	(India) Kush Kumar	11	5	4	11	15
9/16	(Republic of Ireland) Michael Craig	13	6	7	6
2	(Egypt) Omar El Atmas	11	11	11	11

Semi-finals
1	(Peru) Diego Elías	11	8	11	11
3/4	(England) George Parker	4	11	5	2
3/4	(India) Kush Kumar	11	4	6	6
2	(Egypt) Omar El Atmas	9	11	11	11

Final
1	(Peru) Diego Elías	13	11	11	11
2	(Egypt) Omar El Atmas	15	2	2	3

==== Girls Under 19 ====
Quarter finals
1	(Egypt) Nouran Gohar	11	11	11
9/16	(Egypt) Hana Ramadan	2	8	4
3/4	(Egypt) Salma Hany	11	11	11
5/8	(England) Georgina Kennedy	7	5	7
5/8	(France) Marie Stephan	9	9	2
3/4	(Belgium) Nele Gilis	11	11	11
(England) Amelia Henley	6	5	8
2	(Egypt) Mariam Metwally	11	11	11

Semi-finals
1	(Egypt) Nouran Gohar	11	3	7	16	11
3/4	(Egypt) Salma Hany	5	11	11	14	6
3/4	(Belgium) Nele Gilis	7	5	7
2	(Egypt) Mariam Metwally	11	11	11

Final
1	(Egypt) Nouran Gohar	9	11	11	5	11
2	(Egypt) Mariam Metwally	11	7	9	11	9

=== Under 17 ===
==== Boys Under 17 ====
Quarter finals
1	(Malaysia) Eain Yow Ng	11	11	11
17/32	(Canada) Michael Mehl	9	9	5
3/4	(Egypt) Youssef Ibrahim	9	11	11	9	12
5/8	(India) Velavan Senthilkumar	11	4	4	11	10
9/16	(Egypt) Karim Magdy	6	15	9	11	15
3/4	(Jordan) Mohammad Al-Saraj	11	13	11	9	13
5/8	(Egypt) Belal Wael	3	7	1
2	(Egypt) Saad El Din Ihab	11	11	11

Semi-finals
1	(Malaysia) Eain Yow Ng	6	11	11	11
3/4	(Egypt) Youssef Ebrahim	11	6	3	4
9/16	(Egypt) Karim Magdy	9	5	3
2	(Egypt) Saad El Din Ihab	11	11	11

Final
1	(Malaysia) Eain Yow Ng	7	5	11	11	11
2	(Egypt) Saad El Din Ihab	11	11	9	9	4

==== Girls Under 17 ====
Quarter finals
1	(Egypt) Habiba Mohamed	11	11	11
9/16	(Malaysia) Andrea Jia Qi Lee	4	2	4
3/4	(Egypt) Nadine Kottb	11	11	11
5/8	(Malaysia) Zoe Foo Yuk Han	8	3	6
9/16	(Egypt) Mariam Mostafa	3	8	7
3/4	(Egypt) Menat Allah Hamed	11	11	11
9/16	(Egypt) Zena Mekiwy	11	10	11	11
2	(Malaysia) Sivasangari Subramaniam	6	12	9	7

Semi-finals
1	(Egypt) Habiba Mohamed	11	11	11
3/4	(Egypt) Nadine Kottb	7	3	5
3/4	(Egypt) Menat Allah Hamed	10	5	2
9/16	(Egypt) Zena Mekiwy	12	11	11

Final
1	(Egypt) Habiba Mohamed	11	11	11
2	(Egypt) Zena Mekiwy	2	5	4

=== Under 15 ===
==== Boys Under 15 ====
Quarter finals
1	(Egypt) Marwan Tarek	11	11	11
5/8	(Malaysia) Mohd Haffiz Mohd Arif	6	4	2
3/4	(Egypt) Mohamed El Shamy	12	12	11
5/8	(England) Nicholas Wall	10	10	8
5/8	(Egypt) Ahmed El Mashad	11	11	11
17/32	(Canada) Darosham Khan	6	9	5
5/8	(India) Tushar Shahani	3	0	5
2	(Egypt) Mostafa Asal	11	11	11

Semi-finals
1	(Egypt) Marwan Tarek	11	9	11	7	11
3/4	(Egypt) Mohamed El Shamy	9	11	5	11	1
5/8	(Egypt) Ahmed El Mashad	13	10	11	11
2	(Egypt) Mostafa Asal	11	12	2	8

Final
1	(Egypt) Marwan Tarek	11	10	11	11
5/8	(Egypt) Ahmed El Mashad	7	12	8	4

==== Girls Under 15 ====
Quarter finals
1	(Egypt) Hania El Hammamy	11	11	12
5/8	(Egypt) Nada Abbas	6	7	10
3/4	(Egypt) Amina Yasser	11	11	11
5/8	(Hong Kong) Hui Lam Lui	1	8	6
5/8	(Egypt) Hana Moataz	11	12	11
3/4	(England) Elize Lazarus	8	10	4
5/8	(Malaysia) Aifa Azman	9	4	7
2	(Egypt) Rowan Reda Araby	11	11	11

Semi-finals
1	(Egypt) Hania El Hammamy	9	12	11	12
3/4	(Egypt) Amina Yasser	11	10	7	10
5/8	(Egypt) Hana Moataz	5	5	3
2	(Egypt) Rowan Reda Araby	11	11	11

Final
1	(Egypt) Hania El Hammamy	11	7	11	14
2	(Egypt) Rowan Reda Araby	9	11	7	12

=== Under 13 ===
==== Boys Under 13 ====
Quarter finals
1	(Egypt) Yehia El Nawsany	11	11	11
17/32	(Malaysia) Muhd Amirul Azhar	5	2	4
3/4	(England) Sam Todd	6	11	6	13	11
5/8	(Egypt) Marwan Reda	11	9	11	11	7
17/32	(Pakistan) Harris Qasim	12	14	9	12
9/16	(Egypt) Karim Elbarbary	10	12	11	10
9/16	(England) Josh Perkins	5	3	3
2	(Egypt) Ali Yacout	11	11	11

Semi-finals
1	(Egypt) Yehia El Nawsany	11	11	11
3/4	(England) Sam Todd	8	2	5
17/32	(Pakistan) Harris Qasim	13	11	5	12	11
2	(Egypt) Ali Yacout	15	7	11	10	5

Final
1	(Egypt) Yehia El Nawsany	11	11	7	6	11
17/32	(Pakistan) Harris Qasim	8	4	11	11	4

==== Girls Under 13 ====
Quarter finals
1	(Egypt) Nouran Youssef	7	9	11	11	11
9/16	(United States) Marina Stefanoni	11	11	7	7	5
9/16	(Egypt) Malik Ashraf	9	11	11	11
9/16	(Malaysia) Noor Ampandi	11	1	5	9
5/8	(Egypt) Sana Mahmoud	9	11	8	4
3/4	(Malaysia) Jessica Keng	11	8	11	11
9/16	(Egypt) Nour Abo El Makarem	11	7	6
2	(Egypt) Farida Mohamed	13	11	11

Semi-finals
1	(Egypt) Nouran Youssef	11	11	11
9/16	(Egypt) Malik Ashraf	3	4	8
3/4	(Malaysia) Jessica Keng	12	11	11
2	(Egypt) Farida Mohamed	10	8	6

Final
1	(Egypt) Nouran Youssef	9	13	11	10
3/4	(Malaysia) Jessica Keng *	11	11	7	8

Note :

- Match was awarded to Jessica Keng.

== See also ==
- British Junior Open
- World Junior Squash Circuit
