= British Junior Open Squash =

Annual Junior squash championship in England

British Junior Open

Details
- Event name: British Junior Open
- Location: Birmingham, England
- Venue: Edgbaston Priory Club; University of Birmingham Sport and Fitness Centre; Solihull Arden Club; West Warwickshire Sports Club
- Website; British Junior Open

The British Junior Open is considered the second most prestigious junior open squash championship after the World Junior Squash Championships. It is one of the five Tier 2 events in the WSF World Junior Squash Circuit. British Junior Open is divided into ten categories: Boys under-19, boys under-17, boys under-15, boys under-13, boys under-11, girls under-19, girls under-17, girls under-15, girls under-13, and girls under-11.

The under-19 boys category was known as the Drysdale Cup before 1999; the under-16 and under-14 categories were both held prior to 1999, until they were replaced by the under-15 and under-17 categories. The under-13 categories were also introduced in the same year. The tournament moved to Birmingham from 2018 onwards, where the under-11 categories were introduced.

== Boys tournament ==
=== Prior to 1999 ===
Year	Under-14	Under-16	Under-19 (Drysdale Cup prior to 1999)
1979	tournament not created	(Sweden) Joakim Hirsch	(Australia) Glen Brumby
1980	tournament not created	(West Germany) Carol Martini	(New Zealand) Stuart Davenport
1981	tournament not created	(England) Nigel Stiles	(Australia) Chris Dittmar
1982	(England) Robert Graham	(Pakistan) Asad Ahmed	(Australia) Chris Dittmar
1983	(England) Damian Walker	(England) Danny Meddings	(England) Jamie Hickox
1984	(England) D Simpson	(England) Del Harris	(England) David Lloyd
1985	(England) Peter Marshall	(England) Damian Walker	(England) Del Harris
1986	(England) Simon Parke	(England) Steve Meads	(England) Del Harris
1987	(England) Stacey Ross	(England) Simon Parke	(England) Del Harris
1988	(England) Justin Rennie	(England) Simon Parke	(England) Del Harris
1989	(England) Paul Hargrave	(England) Stacey Ross	(England) Simon Parke
1990	(England) Chris Tomlinson	(England) Justin Rennie	(England) Peter Marshall
1991	(Egypt) Ahmed Barada	(England) Paul Hargrave	(England) Simon Parke
1992	(Egypt) Ahmed Faizy	(Egypt) Ahmed Barada	(Finland) Juha Raumolin
1993	(Egypt) Ahmed Faizy	(Egypt) Ahmed Barada	(England) Justin Rennie
1994	(Malaysia) Ong Beng Hee	(Egypt) Ahmed Faizy	(Egypt) Ahmed Barada
1995	(England) Jonathan Kemp	(Egypt) Ahmed Faizy	(England) Iain Higgins
1996	(Spain) Alberto Manso	(Malaysia) Ong Beng Hee	(Egypt) Ahmed Faizy
1997	(England) James Willstrop	(Spain) Alberto Manso	(Egypt) Ahmed Faizy
1998	(Egypt) Yasser El Halaby	(Spain) Alberto Manso	(Malaysia) Ong Beng Hee

=== After 1999 ===
Year	Under-11	Under-13	Under-15	Under-17	Under-19
1999	tournament not created	(Egypt) Ramy Ashour	(Egypt) Yasser El Halaby	(France) Grégory Gaultier	(England) Nick Matthew
2000	tournament not created	(Egypt) Ramy Ashour	(Egypt) Omar Refaat	(England) James Willstrop	(Egypt) Karim Darwish
2001	tournament not created	(Egypt) Tarek Momen	(Egypt) Ramy Ashour	(Egypt) Yasser El Halaby	(France) Grégory Gaultier
2002	tournament not created	(Egypt) Mohammed Ali Anwar Reda	(Pakistan) Farhan Mehboob	(Pakistan) Safeer Ullah Khan	(England) James Willstrop
2003	tournament not created	(Pakistan) Aamir Atlas Khan	(Egypt) Tarek Momen	(Pakistan) Yasir Butt	(Pakistan) Safeer Ullah Khan
2004	tournament not created	(Pakistan) Waqar Mehboob	(Pakistan) Aamir Atlas Khan	(Egypt) Omar Mosaad	(India) Saurav Ghosal
2005	tournament not created	(Pakistan) Farhan Zaman	(Pakistan) Shoaib Hassan	(Egypt) Omar Mosaad	(Pakistan) Basit Ashfaq
2006	tournament not created	(Egypt) Karim Ali Fathi	(Egypt) Mohamed El Shorbagy	(Egypt) Mohammed Ali Anwar Reda	(Egypt) Ramy Ashour
2007	tournament not created	(Pakistan) Nasir Iqbal	(Egypt) Amr Khalid Khalifa	(Egypt) Mohamed El Shorbagy	(Egypt) Omar Mosaad
2008	tournament not created	(Egypt) Osama Khalifa	(Egypt) Karim Ali Fathi	(Egypt) Karim Abdel Gawad	(Egypt) Mohamed El Shorbagy
2009	tournament not created	(Egypt) Amr Aboul Souad	(India) Mahesh Mangaonkar	(Egypt) Amr Khalid Khalifa	(Egypt) Mohamed El Shorbagy
2010	tournament not created	(Egypt) Youssef Mohamed	(Egypt) Shehab Essam	(Egypt) Marwan El Shorbagy	(Egypt) Mohamed El Shorbagy
2011	tournament not created	(Malaysia) Eain Yow Ng	(Egypt) Mohamed El Gawarhy	(Egypt) Mazen Gamal	(Egypt) Ali Farag
2012	tournament not created	(Egypt) Ziad Sakr	(Pakistan) Israr Ahmed	(Egypt) Shehab Essam	(Egypt) Marwan El Shorbagy
2013	tournament not created	(Egypt) Mohamed El Shamy	(Malaysia) Eain Yow Ng	(Peru) Diego Elías	(Egypt) Fares Dessouky
2014	tournament not created	(Egypt) Mohamed El Shamy	(Egypt) Youssef Ibrahim	(Egypt) Youssef Soliman	(Jordan) Ahmad Al-Saraj
2015	tournament not created	(Egypt) Yahya Elnawasany	(Egypt) Marwan Tarek	(Malaysia) Eain Yow Ng	(Peru) Diego Elías
2016	tournament not created	(England) Sam Todd	(Egypt) Omar El Torkey	(Egypt) Youssef Ibrahim	(Egypt) Youssef Soliman
2017	tournament not created	(Republic of Ireland) Denis Gilevskiy	(Egypt) Yahya Elnawasany	(Egypt) Marwan Tarek	(India) Velavan Senthilkumar
2018	(Egypt) Ahmed Rashed	(England) Jonah Bryant	(England) Sam Todd	(Egypt) Mostafa Asal	(Egypt) Marwan Tarek
2019	(Malaysia) Nickhileswar Moganasundharam	(England) Abdullah Eissa	(Malaysia) Ameeshenraj Chandaran	(Egypt) Yahya Elnawasany	(Egypt) Mostafa Asal
2020	(Egypt) Yassin Kouritam	(Egypt) Youssef Salem	(Pakistan) Hamza Khan	(England) Sam Todd	(Egypt) Moustafa El Sirty
2021	Not played due to COVID-19	Not played due to COVID-19	Not played due to COVID-19	Not played due to COVID-19	Not played due to COVID-19
2022	Not played due to COVID-19	Not played due to COVID-19	Not played due to COVID-19	Not played due to COVID-19	(England) Sam Todd
2023	(Egypt) Hazem Sarwat	(United States) Carlton Capella	(Egypt) Marwan Asal	(Egypt) Youssef Salem	(England) Finnlay Withington
2024	(Egypt) Adam Ragab	(Egypt) Malek Helmy	(Egypt) Philopater Saleh	(Egypt) Youssef Salem	(Egypt) Mohamed Zakaria
2025	(Egypt) Anas Tawfik	(Pakistan) Sohail Adnan	(United States) Vivaan Mehta	(Egypt) Seifeldin Refaay	(Egypt) Eiad Daoud

== Girls tournament ==
=== Prior to 1999 ===
Year	Under-14	Under-16	Under-19
1980	tournament not created	(England) Lucy Soutter	(England) Alison Cumings
1981	tournament not created	(England) Lucy Soutter	(England) Ruth Strauss
1982	tournament not created	(England) Lucy Soutter	(England) Suzanne Burgess
1983	tournament not created	(England) Lucy Soutter	(England) Lucy Soutter
1984	tournament not created	(Scotland) Senga Macfie	(England) Lucy Soutter
1985	tournament not created	(England) Carolyn Mett	(England) Tracy Cunliffe
1986	tournament not created	(England) Sue Wright	(Scotland) Senga Macfie
1987	tournament not created	(England) Melissa Fryer	(England) Donna Vardy
1988	tournament not created	(England) Cassie Jackman	(England) Donna Vardy
1989	tournament not created	(West Germany) Sabine Schoene	(England) Donna Vardy
1990	tournament not created	(Germany) Sabine Schoene	(England) Cassie Jackman
1991	(England) Stephanie Brind	(England) Jenny Tranfield	(England) Cassie Jackman
1992	(Scotland) Laura Hamilton	(Austria) Pamela Pancis	(Germany) Sabine Schoene
1993	(France) Isabelle Stoehr	(South Africa) Natalie Grainger	(Germany) Sabine Schoene
1994	(England) Vicky Lankester	(England) Tania Bailey	(England) Jenny Tranfield
1995	(Spain) Elisabet Sadó Garriga	(England) Tania Bailey	(New Zealand) Jade Wilson
1996	(Malaysia) Nicol David	(Germany) Simone Leifels	(England) Tracey Shenton
1997	(Malaysia) Nicol David	(Spain) Elisabet Sadó Garriga	(Belgium) Kim Hannes-Teunen
1998	(Egypt) Omneya Abdel Kawy	(Malaysia) Nicol David	(England) Tania Bailey

=== After 1999 ===
Year	Under-11	Under-13	Under-15	Under-17	Under-19
1999	tournament not created	(Egypt) Sara Badr	(Egypt) Omneya Abdel Kawy	(Malaysia) Nicol David	(Spain) Elisabet Sadó Garriga
2000	tournament not created	(Egypt) Sara Badr	(Egypt) Omneya Abdel Kawy	(Switzerland) Manuela Zehnder	(Malaysia) Nicol David
2001	tournament not created	(Egypt) Raneem El Weleily	(Egypt) Sara Badr	(United States) Michelle Quibell	(Egypt) Omneya Abdel Kawy
2002	tournament not created	(Egypt) Shahenga Osama	(Egypt) Raneem El Weleily	(Australia) Kasey Brown	(Egypt) Omneya Abdel Kawy
2003	tournament not created	(Egypt) Alia Balbaa	(Egypt) Raneem El Weleily	(India) Joshna Chinappa	(Egypt) Omneya Abdel Kawy
2004	tournament not created	(Egypt) Heba El Torky	(Hong Kong) Annie Au	(Egypt) Raneem El Weleily	(Egypt) Omneya Abdel Kawy
2005	tournament not created	(Egypt) Nour El Tayeb	(Egypt) Heba El Torky	(Egypt) Raneem El Weleily	(India) Joshna Chinappa
2006	tournament not created	(Malaysia) Tan Yan Xin	(Egypt) Heba El Torky	(France) Camille Serme	(Egypt) Lina El Tannir
2007	tournament not created	(Egypt) Nour El Sherbini	(United States) Olivia Blatchford	(Egypt) Heba El Torky	(Egypt) Raneem El Weleily
2008	tournament not created	(Egypt) Nour El Sherbini	(Egypt) Nour El Tayeb	(India) Dipika Pallikal	(France) Camille Serme
2009	tournament not created	(Egypt) Yathreb Adel	(Egypt) Nour El Sherbini	(Egypt) Nour El Tayeb	(Malaysia) Low Wee Wern
2010	tournament not created	(Egypt) Mayar Hany	(Egypt) Yathreb Adel	(Egypt) Nour El Tayeb	(Egypt) Nour El Sherbini
2011	tournament not created	(Egypt) Habiba Mohamed	(Egypt) Salma Hany	(England) Emily Whitlock	(Egypt) Nour El Tayeb
2012	tournament not created	(Egypt) Habiba Mohamed	(Egypt) Nouran Gohar	(Egypt) Yathreb Adel	(Egypt) Nour El Sherbini
2013	tournament not created	(Egypt) Hania El Hammamy	(Egypt) Habiba Mohamed	(Egypt) Yathreb Adel	(England) Emily Whitlock
2014	tournament not created	(Malaysia) Aifa Azman	(Malaysia) Sivasangari Subramaniam	(Egypt) Habiba Mohamed	(Egypt) Yathreb Adel
2015	tournament not created	(Malaysia) Jessica Keng	(Egypt) Hania El Hammamy	(Egypt) Habiba Mohamed	(Egypt) Nouran Gohar
2016	tournament not created	(Egypt) Sana Mahmoud	(Malaysia) Aifa Azman	(Egypt) Hania El Hammamy	(Egypt) Nouran Gohar
2017	tournament not created	(Egypt) Salma El Tayeb	(Egypt) Nour Abouelmakrim	(Egypt) Hana Motaz Ayoub	(Egypt) Hania El Hammamy
2018	(Egypt) Amina Orfi	(Malaysia) Sehveetrraa Kumar	(Malaysia) Aira Azman	(Malaysia) Aifa Azman	(Malaysia) Sivasangari Subramaniam
2019	(India) Anahat Singh	(Egypt) Amina Orfi	(Egypt) Salma El Tayeb	(United States) Marina Stefanoni	(Egypt) Hania El Hammamy
2020	(Malaysia) Harleein Tan	(Egypt) Amina Orfi	(Egypt) Fayrouz Abouelkheir	(Egypt) Sana Mahmoud Ibrahim	(Egypt) Jana Shiha
2021	Not played due to COVID-19	Not played due to COVID-19	Not played due to COVID-19	Not played due to COVID-19	Not played due to COVID-19
2022	Not played due to COVID-19	Not played due to COVID-19	Not played due to COVID-19	Not played due to COVID-19	(England) Torrie Malik
2023	(Egypt) Talia Sherif	(Egypt) Habiba Rizk	(India) Anahat Singh	(United States) Madison Ho	(Egypt) Amina Orfi
2024	(Egypt) Serein Mohamed	(Egypt) Layan Moustafa	(Egypt) Malika Elkaraksy	(Egypt) Nadien Elhammamy	(Egypt) Fayrouz Aboelkheir
2025	(Egypt) Farida Hakim	(Egypt) Salma Elbaz	(Egypt) Habiba Rizk	(India) Anahat Singh	(Egypt) Janna Galal

== Statistics ==
=== Performance by nations ===
As of the 2025 edition

Girls
Country	U11	U13	U15	U17	U19	Total
Egypt	4	21	19	13	17	74
Malaysia	1	4	3	2	3	13
India	1	0	1	4	1	7
United States	0	0	1	3	0	4
England	0	0	0	1	2	3
France	0	0	0	1	1	2
Spain	0	0	0	0	1	1
Australia	0	0	0	1	0	1
Switzerland	0	0	0	1	0	1
Hong Kong	0	0	1	0	0	1
Total	6	25	25	25	25	106

Boys
Country	U11	U13	U15	U17	U19	Total
Egypt	5	14	15	18	15	67
Pakistan	0	5	4	4	2	15
England	0	3	1	2	4	10
Malaysia	1	1	2	1	0	5
India	0	0	1	0	2	3
France	0	0	0	1	1	2
Peru	0	0	0	1	1	2
United States	0	1	1	0	0	2
Jordan	0	0	0	0	1	1
Ireland	0	1	0	0	0	1
Total	6	25	25	25	25	106

Note:
1) The 2000 edition for both boys and girls was held in December 1999.

== See also ==
- British Open
- World Junior Squash Circuit
- World Junior Squash Championships
- US Junior Open squash championship
- French Junior Open Squash
- Dutch Junior Open Squash
- European Squash Federation
- England Squash & Racketball
- World Open
