= British Junior Open Squash 2014 =

BJO 2014

Details
- Event name: British Junior Open 2014
- Location: Sheffield, England
- Venue: Hallamshire Squash Club; Abbeydale Park Club; Fulwood Sports Club
- Website squashsite.co.uk/bjo/

The British Junior Open 2014 is the edition of the 2014's British Junior Open Squash, which is a World Junior Squash Circuit event Tier 2. The event took place in Sheffield in England from 2 to 6 January.

== Draw and results ==
Restricted from the quarter-final

=== Under 19 ===
==== Boys Under 19 ====
Quarter finals
1	(Egypt) Karim El Hammamy	11	11	11	11
5/8	(Israel) Daniel Poleshchuk	13	6	7	7
3/4	(Peru) Diego Elías	13	11	11
5/8	(Egypt) Mohamed El Gawarhy	11	6	4
17/32	(England) George Parker	11	12	4	12
3/4	(England) Richie Fallows	6	10	11	10
5/8	(Jordan) Ahmad Al-Saraj	7	11	11	11
9/16	(India) Kush Kumar	11	9	8	4

Semi-finals
1	(Egypt) Karim El Hammamy	7	1	6
3/4	(Peru) Diego Elías	11	11	11
17/32	(England) George Parker	6	11	8	13
5/8	(Jordan) Ahmad Al-Saraj	11	3	11	15

Final
3/4	(Peru) Diego Elías	7	9	11	3
5/8	(Jordan) Ahmad Al-Saraj	11	11	8	11

==== Girls Under 19 ====
Quarter finals
1	(Egypt) Mariam Ibrahim Metwally	6	11	11	11
9/16	(England) Lily Taylor	11	7	6	1
3/4	(Egypt) Salma Hany Ahmed	11	11	11
5/8	(England) Nada Elkalaawy	8	7	2
5/8	(England) Anna Kimberley	1	5	9
3/4	(Egypt) Nouran Ahmed Gohar	11	11	11
5/8	(Belgium) Nele Gilis	6	1	8
2	(Egypt) Yathreb Adel	11	11	11

Semi-finals
1	(Egypt) Mariam Ibrahim Metwally	11	13	11
3/4	(Egypt) Salma Hany Ahmed	9	11	7
3/4	(Egypt) Nouran Ahmed Gohar	5	5	11	9
2	(Egypt) Yathreb Adel	11	11	9	11

Final
1	(Egypt) Mariam Ibrahim Metwally	9	9	11	9
2	(Egypt) Yathreb Adel	11	11	7	11

=== Under 17 ===
==== Boys Under 17 ====
Quarter finals
1	(Egypt) Youssef Soliman	11	11	4	11
5/8	(Egypt) Saad El Din Ihab	8	6	11	7
3/4	(Malaysia) Mohd Mukhtar	10	8	11
5/8	(Jordan) Mohammad Al-Saraj	12	11	13
5/8	(England) Patrick Rooney	11	11	11
9/16	(England) James Peach	5	5	5
5/8	(Egypt) Adham Mady	5	6	rtd
2	(Malaysia) Eain Yow Ng	11	11

Semi-finals
1	(Egypt) Youssef Soliman	11	11	11
5/8	(Jordan) Mohammad Al-Saraj	7	5	8
5/8	(England) Patrick Rooney	10	7	8
2	(Malaysia) Eain Yow Ng	12	11	11

Final
1	(Egypt) Youssef Soliman	11	9	11	11
2	(Malaysia) Eain Yow Ng	8	11	5	7

==== Girls Under 17 ====
Quarter finals
1	(Egypt) Habiba Mohamed	11	11	11
5/8	(Egypt) Nouran Magdy	4	4	0
3/4	(Egypt) Nadin Shahin	12	8	17	11
5/8	(England) Georgina Kennedy	10	11	15	8
5/8	(Malaysia) Nazihah Hanis	4	6	4
3/4	(Egypt) Hana Ramadan	11	11	11
9/16	(India) Harshit Jawanda	1	9	5
2	(Egypt) Mayar Hany	11	11	11

Semi-finals
1	(Egypt) Habiba Mohamed	11	11	11
3/4	(Egypt) Nadin Shahin	4	4	4
3/4	(Egypt) Hana Ramadan	11	6	11	11
2	(Egypt) Mayar Hany	4	11	5	4

Final
1	(Egypt) Habiba Mohamed	11	11	11
3/4	(Egypt) Hana Ramadan	6	3	4

=== Under 15 ===
==== Boys Under 15 ====
Quarter finals
1	(Egypt) Youssef Ibrahim	11	11	14
5/8	(Egypt) Andrew Magdy	7	7	12
9/16	(India) Adhitya Raghavan	11	11	8	11
17/32	(United States) Patrick McElroy	4	3	11	8
5/8	(France) Victor Crouin	9	5	7
3/4	(Egypt) Moustafa Montaser	11	11	11
9/16	(Malaysia) Sai Hung Ong	7	13	6	8
2	(Egypt) Ziad Sakr	11	11	11	11

Semi-finals
1	(Egypt) Youssef Ibrahim	13	11	9	11
9/16	(India) Adhitya Raghavan	11	7	11	7
3/4	(Egypt) Moustafa Montaser	11	11	11
2	(Egypt) Ziad Sakr	5	8	9

Final
1	(Egypt) Youssef Ibrahim	11	11	11
3/4	(Egypt) Moustafa Montaser	13	9	6

==== Girls Under 15 ====
Quarter finals
1	(Malaysia) Sivasangari Subramaniam	11	11	11
(Hong Kong) Hiu Lam Lui	7	4	4
3/4	(Egypt) Amina Yousry	11	11	11
5/8	(Japan) Satomi Watanabe	1	5	7
5/8	(England) Elise Lazarus	5	4	17	8
3/4	(Egypt) Hania El Hammamy	11	11	15	11
5/8	(Egypt) Hana Ayoub	7	7	8
2	(Egypt) Rowan Reda	11	11	11

Semi-finals
1	(Malaysia) Sivasangari Subramaniam	7	11	13	2	16
3/4	(Egypt) Amina Yousry	11	9	11	11	14
3/4	(Egypt) Hania El Hammamy	9	11	11	11
2	(Egypt) Rowan Reda	11	9	0	4

Final
1	(Malaysia) Sivasangari Subramaniam	7	11	8	11	11
3/4	(Egypt) Hania El Hammamy	11	8	11	5	6

=== Under 13 ===
==== Boys Under 13 ====
Quarter finals
1	(Egypt) Mohamed El Shamy	11	11	11
9/16	(Malaysia) Kiven Shanmuganathan	3	6	5
3/4	(Egypt) Yehia El Nawasamy	13	7	9	5
9/16	(Czech Republic) Viktor Byrtus	11	11	11	11
5/8	(Egypt) Moustafa El Serty	11	9	11	6
3/4	(Egypt) Mostafa Asal	9	11	13	11
5/8	(India) Tushar Shahani	11	12	4	8	8
2	(Egypt) Asser Hisham	8	10	11	11	11

Semi-finals
1	(Egypt) Mohamed El Shamy	7	5	11	11	11
9/16	(Czech Republic) Viktor Byrtus	11	11	4	9	9
3/4	(Egypt) Mostafa Asal	11	4	11	11
2	(Egypt) Asser Hisham	9	11	8	7

Final
1	(Egypt) Mohamed El Shamy	11	8	9	12	11
3/4	(Egypt) Mostafa Asal	8	11	11	10	6

==== Girls Under 13 ====
Quarter finals
1	(Egypt) Jana Shiha	11	11	12
9/16	(United States) Meghna Sreedhar	0	4	10
9/16	(Malaysia) Jessica Kheng	7	13	11	4	6
5/8	(Egypt) Gamela Tamer	11	11	9	11	11
5/8	(Egypt) Farida Mohamed	9	4	4
3/4	(Malaysia) Aifa Azman	11	11	11
(Malaysia) Amirah Rosli	6	5	1
2	(Egypt) Nouran Youssef	11	11	11

Semi-finals
1	(Egypt) Jana Shiha	11	8	11	11
5/8	(Egypt) Gamela Tamer	8	11	6	7
3/4	(Malaysia) Aifa Azman	11	11	11
2	(Egypt) Nouran Youssef	6	7	2

Final
1	(Egypt) Jana Shiha	7	11	11	11	14
3/4	(Malaysia) Aifa Azman	11	11	8	8	16

== See also ==
- British Junior Open
- World Junior Squash Circuit
