= British Junior Open Squash 2012 =

BJO 2012

Details
- Event name: British Junior Open 2012
- Location: Sheffield, England
- Venue: Hallamshire Squash Club; Abbeydale Park Club; Fulwood Sports Club
- Website www.squashsite.co.uk/bjo/today2012.htm

The British Junior Open 2012 is the edition of the 2012's British Junior Open Squash, which is a World Junior Squash Circuit event Tier 2. The event took place in Sheffield in England from 2 to 6 January.

== Draw and results ==
Restricted from the quarter-final

=== Under 19 ===
==== Boys Under 19 ====
Quarter finals
1	(Egypt) Marwan El Shorbagy	11	11	11
5/8	(Pakistan) Danish Atlas Khan	7	8	2
3/4	(Egypt) Mazen Hesham	11	11	11
5/8	(England) Ollie Holland	7	7	6
5/8	(Egypt) Fares Dessouky	11	11	11
3/4	(England) Declan James	3	6	7
5/8	(Pakistan) Nasir Iqbal	7	10	6
2	(Egypt) Mohamed Abouelghar	11	12	11

Semi-finals
1	(Egypt) Marwan El Shorbagy	11	4	11	4	11
3/4	(Egypt) Mazen Hesham	9	11	8	11	7
3/4	(Egypt) Fares Dessouky	7	12	7	9
2	(Egypt) Mohamed Abouelghar	11	10	11	11

Final
1	(Egypt) Marwan El Shorbagy	11	11	11
2	(Egypt) Mohamed Abouelghar	3	2	7

==== Girls Under 19 ====
Quarter finals
1	(Egypt) Nour El Sherbini	11	11	11
(Egypt) Nouran Badr	1	2	8
3/4	(India) Anaka Alankamony	9	6	9
5/8	(Egypt) Salma Hatem Youssef	11	11	11
9/16	(France) Julia Lecoq	2	5	11	5
3/4	(Egypt) Kanzy Emad El Defrawy	11	11	7	11
5/8	(Egypt) Menna Nasser	8	6	9
2	(England) Emily Whitlock	11	11	11

Semi-finals
1	(Egypt) Nour El Sherbini	11	11	12
5/8	(Egypt) Salma Hatem Youssef	6	2	10
3/4	(Egypt) Kanzy Emad El Defrawy	6	11	12	9	11
2	(England) Emily Whitlock	11	9	10	11	7

Final
1	(Egypt) Nour El Sherbini	11	11	11
3/4	(Egypt) Kanzy Emad El Defrawy	8	8	4

=== Under 17 ===
==== Boys Under 17 ====
Quarter finals
1	(Egypt) Osama Khalifa	11	7	8	11
5/8	(England) Ashley Davies	7	11	11	13
3/4	(Pakistan) Syed Ali Bokhari	11	6	5	12
5/8	(Egypt) Karim El Hammamy	7	11	11	14
9/16	(Egypt) Amaad Fareed	7	7	11	8
3/4	(Jordan) Ahmad Al-Saraj	11	11	9	11
5/8	(Egypt) Shehab Essam	11	11	11
9/16	(Pakistan) Tayyab Aslam	7	6	8

Semi-finals
5/8	(England) Ashley Davies	11	13	11	3	14
5/8	(Egypt) Karim El Hammamy	7	15	3	11	12
3/4	(Jordan) Ahmad Al-Saraj	11	0	15	11	4
5/8	(Egypt) Shehab Essam	9	11	17	7	11

Final
5/8	(England) Ashley Davies	11	11	11	9	6
5/8	(Egypt) Shehab Essam	7	13	5	11	11

==== Girls Under 17 ====
Quarter finals
1	(Egypt) Yathreb Adel	11	11	9	11
5/8	(Hong Kong) Choi Uen Shan	5	11	4	5
3/4	(Egypt) Mariam Ibrahim Metwally	11	11	11
5/8	(Hong Kong) Ho Tze-Lok	4	5	3
5/8	(Belgium) Nele Gilis	12	5	11	4	11
9/16	(England) Lucy Beecroft	10	11	7	11	7
9/16	(England) Eleanor Lake	4	3	4
2	(Egypt) Salma Hany Ibrahim	11	11	11

Semi-finals
1	(Egypt) Yathreb Adel	9	11	11	11
3/4	(Egypt) Mariam Ibrahim Metwally	11	9	3	3
5/8	(Belgium) Nele Gilis	6	5	7
2	(Egypt) Salma Hany Ibrahim	11	11	11

Final
1	(Egypt) Yathreb Adel	11	11	11	11
2	(Egypt) Salma Hany Ibrahim	5	3	13	6

=== Under 15 ===
==== Boys Under 15 ====
Quarter finals
1	(Pakistan) Israr Ahmed	12	11	11
9/16	(Jordan) Mohammad Al Saraj	10	4	4
3/4	(Malaysia) Ng Eain Yow	11	11	11
5/8	(Finland) Miko Aijanen	5	7	7
5/8	(Malaysia) Mohd Mukhtar	10	7	9
9/16	(Egypt) Moustafa Taha	11	11	11
5/8	(Germany) Lucas Wirths	12	3	8
2	(Egypt) Youssef Soliman	14	11	11

Semi-finals
1	(Pakistan) Israr Ahmed	11	7	11	9	11
3/4	(Malaysia) Ng Eain Yow	8	11	6	11	5
9/16	(Egypt) Moustafa Taha	9	4	7
2	(Egypt) Youssef Soliman	11	11	11

Final
1	(Pakistan) Israr Ahmed	11	6	11	8	11
2	(Egypt) Youssef Soliman	4	11	8	11	8

==== Girls Under 15 ====
Quarter finals
1	(Egypt) Nouran Ahmed Gohar	11	11	11
5/8	(Malaysia) Aika Azman	2	8	6
3/4	(Egypt) Mayar Hany Mohamed	11	11	11
17/32	(Egypt) Nadine Ayman Shahin	5	7	5
5/8	(Belgium) Tinne Gilis	12	3	5	11	10
3/4	(Egypt) Hana Ramadan	10	11	11	8	12
5/8	(Malaysia) Nazihah Abdul Razak	6	11	11	3
2	(New Zealand) Eleanor Epke	11	7	7	1

Semi-finals
1	(Egypt) Nouran Ahmed Gohar	13	11	11
3/4	(Egypt) Mayar Hany Mohamed	11	4	9
3/4	(Egypt) Hana Ramadan	10	11	11	11
5/8	(Malaysia) Nazihah Abdul Razak	12	5	9	5

Final
1	(Egypt) Nouran Ahmed Gohar	11	11	11
3/4	(Egypt) Hana Ramadan	7	3	6

=== Under 13 ===
==== Boys Under 13 ====
Quarter finals
1	(Egypt) Youssef Ibrahim	6	4	6
17/32	(Pakistan) Kashif Asif	11	11	11
17/32	(Egypt) Abdalah El Masry	11	11	11
5/8	(Malaysia) Kumar Mivesh	9	3	6
5/8	(Egypt) Ziad Sakr	11	11	7	11
17/32	(Egypt) Marwan Tarek	5	8	11	9
5/8	(Pakistan) Hammas Tarrar	5	11	7	8
2	(Egypt) Andrew Fahmy	11	9	11	11

Semi-finals
17/32	(Pakistan) Kashif Asif	11	11	11
17/32	(Egypt) Abdalah El Masry	6	4	9
5/8	(Egypt) Ziad Sakr	11	11	11
2	(Egypt) Andrew Fahmy	5	6	7

Final
17/32	(Pakistan) Kashif Asif	9	9	11	8
5/8	(Egypt) Ziad Sakr	11	11	6	11

==== Girls Under 13 ====
Quarter finals
1	(Egypt) Habiba Mohamed	11	11	11
5/8	(Germany) Saskia Beinhard	4	2	6
9/16	(Egypt) Hania El Hammamy	10	11	11	7	8
5/8	(Japan) Satomi Watanabe	12	5	6	11	11
9/16	(Egypt) Nour Hendawi	11	9	11	11	8
3/4	(Egypt) Amina Yousry	13	11	4	9	11
9/16	(Egypt) Zena Tamer	9	9	13
2	(Malaysia) Sivasang. Subramaniam	11	11	15

Semi-finals
1	(Egypt) Habiba Mohamed	11	11	11
5/8	(Japan) Satomi Watanabe	6	5	5
3/4	(Egypt) Amina Yousry	11	2	11	11
2	(Malaysia) Sivasang. Subramaniam	9	11	6	7

Final
5/8	(Egypt) Habiba Mohamed	11	11	11
3/4	(Egypt) Amina Yousry	8	8	3

== See also ==
- British Junior Open
- 2012 Men's World Junior Squash Championships
- 2012 Women's World Junior Squash Championships
- World Junior Squash Circuit
