= British Junior Open Squash 2016 =

BJO 2016

Details
- Event name: British Junior Open 2016
- Location: Sheffield, England
- Venue: Hallamshire Squash Club; Abbeydale Park Club; Fulwood Sports Club
- Website squashsite.co.uk/bjo/

The British Junior Open 2016 is the edition of the 2016's British Junior Open Squash, which is a World Junior Squash Circuit Tier 2 event. The event took place in Sheffield in England from 2 to 6 January.

== Draw and results ==
Restricted from the quarter-final

=== Under 19 ===
==== Boys Under 19 ====
Quarter finals
1	(Egypt) Youssef Soliman	11	11	11
5/8	(Finland) Miko Aijanen	8	9	3
9/16	(England) Kyle Finch	11	13	7	11
5/8	(England) Patrick Rooney	7	11	11	5
5/8	(England) James Peach	6	7	8
3/4	(Egypt) Saadeldin Abouaish	11	11	11
5/8	(Egypt) Karim Desouky	13	11	11	7	10
2	(Malaysia) Eain Yow Ng	15	5	8	11	12

Semi-finals
1	(Egypt) Youssef Soliman	11	11	12
9/16	(England) Kyle Finch	9	2	10
3/4	(Egypt) Saadeldin Abouaish	11	11	6	11
2	(Malaysia) Eain Yow Ng	9	4	11	3

Final
1	(Egypt) Youssef Soliman	11	11	11
3/4	(Egypt) Saadeldin Abouaish	5	6	5

==== Girls Under 19 ====
Quarter finals
1	(Egypt) Nouran Gohar	11	11	11
5/8	(Malaysia) Andrea Jia Qi Lee	5	8	3
3/4	(Belgium) Tinne Gilis	6	8	3
5/8	(Egypt) Mayar Hany	11	11	11
5/8	(England) Amelia Henley	8	8	11	3
3/4	(Egypt) Nadine Shahin	11	11	4	11
5/8	(Egypt) Zeina Mickawy	6	9	11	11	7
2	(England) Georgina Kennedy	11	11	9	8	11

Semi-finals
1	(Egypt) Nouran Gohar	11	11	11
5/8	(Egypt) Mayar Hany	8	5	4
3/4	(Egypt) Nadine Shahin	4	11	11	11
2	(England) Georgina Kennedy	11	6	7	4

Final
1	(Egypt) Nouran Gohar	11	11	11
3/4	(Egypt) Nadine Shahin	6	5	6

=== Under 17 ===
==== Boys Under 17 ====
Quarter finals
1	(Egypt) Youssef Ibrahim	11	3	11	11
5/8	(United States) Samuel Scherl	8	11	6	8
3/4	(Canada) Michael Mehl	10	10	12	13	9
5/8	(Egypt) Ziad Sakr	12	12	10	11	11
9/16	(Egypt) Mostafa Montaser	11	11	7	11
3/4	(France) Victor Crouin	4	5	11	5
5/8	(India) Adhitya Raghavan	11	4	5
2	(Egypt) Marwan Tarek	13	11	11

Semi-finals
1	(Egypt) Youssef Ibrahim	8	11	11	11
5/8	(Egypt) Ziad Sakr	11	6	5	7
9/16	(Egypt) Mostafa Montaser	11	7	12	3	14
2	(Egypt) Marwan Tarek	8	11	10	11	12

Final
1	(Egypt) Youssef Ibrahim	11	11	11
9/16	(Egypt) Mostafa Montaser	7	5	5

==== Girls Under 17 ====
Quarter finals
1	(Egypt) Hania El Hammamy	11	11	11
5/8	(Japan) Satomi Watanabe	6	7	4
9/16	(England) Jasmine Hutton	2	11	8	3
5/8	(Egypt) Hana Ayoub	11	4	11	11
5/8	(England) Lucy Turmel	6	4	1
3/4	(Egypt) Rowan Reda	11	11	11
17/32	(Hong Kong) Nga Ching Cheng	1	4	8
2	(Egypt) Amina Yousry	11	11	11

Semi-finals
1	(Egypt) Hania El Hammamy	9	11	11	9	11
5/8	(Egypt) Hana Ayoub	11	6	8	11	3
3/4	(Egypt) Rowan Reda	11	11	7	11
2	(Egypt) Amina Yousry	6	9	11	7

Final
1	(Egypt) Hania El Hammamy	4	8	11	11	11
3/4	(Egypt) Rowan Reda	11	11	2	7	5

=== Under 15 ===
==== Boys Under 15 ====
Quarter finals
1	(Egypt) Mostafa Asal	4	11	11	11
5/8	(Egypt) Yehia El Nawsany	11	6	7	4
3/4	(Egypt) Mohamed El Shamy	11	12	8	11	6
9/16	(Egypt) Aly El Tokhy	3	14	11	9	11
5/8	(Egypt) Moustafa El Serty	11	5	11	11
3/4	(Mexico) Juan Carlos Vargas	7	11	8	0
9/16	(Czech Republic) Viktor Byrtus	8	8	11	11	9
2	(Egypt) Omar El Torkey	11	11	7	5	11

Semi-finals
1	(Egypt) Mostafa Asal	11	11	11
9/16	(Egypt) Aly El Tokhy	6	4	5
5/8	(Egypt) Moustafa El Serty	11	6	3	5
2	(Egypt) Omar El Torkey	4	11	11	11

Final
1	(Egypt) Mostafa Asal	8	11	6	11	9
2	(Egypt) Omar El Torkey	11	9	11	8	11

==== Girls Under 15 ====
Quarter finals
1	(Egypt) Jana Shiha	11	11	11
5/8	(England) Alice Green	9	5	6
3/4	(Egypt) Farida Mohamed	9	10	11	9
5/8	(United States) Marina Stefanoni	11	12	9	11
5/8	(India) Navmi Sharma	6	3	3
3/4	(Egypt) Nouran Youssef	11	11	11
5/8	(Egypt) Malak Mostafa	7	4	8
2	(Malaysia) Aifa Azman	11	11	11

Semi-finals
1	(Egypt) Jana Shiha	11	12	7	3	12
5/8	(United States) Marina Stefanoni	4	10	11	11	14
3/4	(Egypt) Nouran Youssef	3	8	9
2	(Malaysia) Aifa Azman	11	11	11

Final
5/8	(United States) Marina Stefanoni	9	11	6	4
2	(Malaysia) Aifa Azman	11	8	11	11

=== Under 13 ===
==== Boys Under 13 ====
Quarter finals
1	(England) Sam Todd	11	11	11
5/8	(Egypt) Ahmed Aly	6	5	6
3/4	(United States) Youssef Ezzo	6	7	9
9/16	(Egypt) Kareem El Torkey	11	11	11
5/8	(England) Sam Osborne Wylde	10	11	3	5
3/4	(Malaysia) Muhammad Azhar	12	9	11	11
5/8	(England) Oliver Green	5	7	9
9/16	(India) Neel Joshi	11	11	11

Semi-finals
1	(England) Sam Todd	11	11	13
9/16	(Egypt) Kareem El Torkey	7	4	11
3/4	(Malaysia) Muhammad Azhar	14	11	12
9/16	(India) Neel Joshi	12	5	10

Final
1	(England) Sam Todd	11	3	15	11
3/4	(Malaysia) Muhammad Azhar	7	11	13	5

==== Girls Under 13 ====
Quarter finals
1	(Egypt) Nour Aboulmakarim	11	9	11	11
5/8	(Malaysia) Heng Wai Wong	4	11	5	9
3/4	(Egypt) Habiba Nader	11	11	11
5/8	(Egypt) Menna Hedia	8	6	2
9/16	(Egypt) Katie Malliff	11	11	11
3/4	(United States) Lucie Stefanoni	9	11	5
5/8	(Malaysia) Aira Azman	5	7	4
2	(Egypt) Sana Mahmoud	11	11	11

Semi-finals
1	(Egypt) Nour Aboulmakarim	11	8	11	11
3/4	(Egypt) Habiba Nader	7	11	2	3
9/16	(Egypt) Katie Malliff	11	10	6	8
2	(Egypt) Sana Mahmoud	8	12	11	11

Final
1	(Egypt) Nour Aboulmakarim	9	11	13	5
2	(Egypt) Sana Mahmoud	11	9	15	11

== See also ==
- British Junior Open
- World Junior Squash Circuit
