= 2021 Women's British Open Squash Championship =

British Open
- Women's British Open

Details
- Event name: 2021 Allam British Open
- Location: Hull, England
- Venue: University of Hull Sports Complex
- Dates: 16–22 August 2021

Women's Winner
- Prize money: $175,000
- Year: 2020–21 PSA World Tour

The Women's 2021 Allam British Open was the women's edition of the 2021 British Open Squash Championships, which is a 2020–21 PSA World Tour event. The event took place at the Sports Complex at the University of Hull in Hull in England between August 16 and 22, 2021. The event was sponsored by Dr Assem Allam.

The event was arranged for June instead of May because of the COVID-19 pandemic in the United Kingdom and then rearranged for August. The 2020 event had also been cancelled due to the pandemic.

Nour El Sherbini defeated Nouran Gohar in an all Egyptian final, which saw Nour El Sherbini winning the title for the third time.

== Seeds ==
1. (Egypt) Nour El Sherbini (champion)
2. (Egypt) Nouran Gohar (runner-up)
3. (France) Camille Serme (second round)
4. (Egypt) Hania El Hammamy (semi-finals)
5. (England) Sarah-Jane Perry (quarter-finals)
6. (United States) Amanda Sobhy (semi-finals)
7. (New Zealand) Joelle King (quarter-finals)
8. (Egypt) Salma Hany (second round)

== Draw and results ==
=== Semi-finals and final ===
Semi-finals
1	(Egypt) Nour El Sherbini	11	9	11	11
6	(United States) Amanda Sobhy	7	11	2	6
4	(Egypt) Hania El Hammamy	8	5	9
2	(Egypt) Nouran Gohar	11	11	11

Final
1	(Egypt) Nour El Sherbini	9	13	5	11	11
2	(Egypt) Nouran Gohar	11	11	11	7	2

=== Main Draw ===
==== Top half ====
First round
1	(Egypt) Nour El Sherbini
[Bye]
(Switzerland) Nadia Pfister	7	5	2
17/32	(United States) Olivia Fiechter	11	11	11
9/16	(India) Joshna Chinappa
[Bye]
WC	(England) Katie Malliff	9	11	9	5
17/32	(United States) Haley Mendez	11	9	11	11
17/32	(England) Lucy Turmel	11	11	11
(Switzerland) Cindy Merlo	8	3	4
(Egypt) Hana Ramadan	3	9	12	4
17/32	(Malaysia) Rachel Arnold	11	11	10	11
9/16	(Egypt) Nadine Shahin
[Bye]
[Bye]
8	(Egypt) Salma Hany
6	(United States) Amanda Sobhy
[Bye]
WC	(England) Georgina Kennedy	13	12	15	11	6
17/32	(Malaysia) Sivasangari Subramaniam	15	14	13	9	11
9/16	(United States) Olivia Clyne
[Bye]
(United States) Marina Stefanoni	4	10	5
17/32	(Netherlands) Milou van der Heijden	11	12	11
9/16	(Egypt) Rowan Elaraby
[Bye]
(Spain) Cristina Gomez	12	6	8	3
17/32	(South Africa) Alexandra Fuller	10	11	11	11
17/32	(Canada) Danielle Letourneau	11	11	11
(Latvia) Ineta Mackevica	3	3	8
[Bye]
3	(France) Camille Serme

Second round
1	(Egypt) Nour El Sherbini	11	11	11
(United States) Olivia Fiechter	8	2	6
(India) Joshna Chinappa	13	13	11
(United States) Haley Mendez	11	11	6
(England) Lucy Turmel	4	6	7
(Malaysia) Rachel Arnold	11	11	11
(Egypt) Nadine Shahin	11	12	3	11
8	(Egypt) Salma Hany	7	10	11	8
6	(United States) Amanda Sobhy	9	11	11	11
(Malaysia) Sivasangari Subramaniam	11	2	6	8
(United States) Olivia Clyne	10	11	10	11	11
(Netherlands) Milou van der Heijden	12	7	12	6	6
(Egypt) Rowan Elaraby	8	11	11	11
(South Africa) Alexandra Fuller	11	3	8	7
(Canada) Danielle Letourneau	w/o
3	(France) Camille Serme

Third round
1	(Egypt) Nour El Sherbini	11	11	11
(India) Joshna Chinappa	4	9	1
(Malaysia) Rachel Arnold	11	9	9	9
(Egypt) Nadine Shahin	8	11	11	11
6	(United States) Amanda Sobhy	11	11	11
(United States) Olivia Clyne	5	4	4
(Egypt) Rowan Elaraby	11	11	11
(Canada) Danielle Letourneau	4	3	3

Quarter-finals
1	(Egypt) Nour El Sherbini	11	11	11
(Egypt) Nadine Shahin	5	2	4
Semi-finals
1	(Egypt) Nour El Sherbini	11	9	11	11
6	(United States) Amanda Sobhy	7	11	2	6
6	(United States) Amanda Sobhy	11	12
(Egypt) Rowan Elaraby	7	10^{r}

==== Bottom half ====
First round
4	(Egypt) Hania El Hammamy
[Bye]
[Bye]
9/16	(Canada) Hollie Naughton
17/32	(France) Melissa Alves	11	11	11
(France) Marie Stephan	8	7	8
[Bye]
9/16	(Belgium) Nele Gilis
17/32	(United States) Sabrina Sobhy	11	11	11
(England) Lily Taylor	3	4	3
[Bye]
9/16	(Belgium) Tinne Gilis
17/32	(England) Jasmine Hutton	11	11	11
(France) Enora Villard	2	8	5
[Bye]
7	(New Zealand) Joelle King
5	(England) Sarah-Jane Perry
[Bye]
(Netherlands) Tessa ter Sluis	8	4	5
17/32	(France) Coline Aumard	11	11	11
17/32	(Egypt) Mariam Metwally	11	11	11
(England) Rachael Chadwick	2	4	2
(Czech Republic) Anna Serme	6	7	8
17/32	(Australia) Donna Lobban	11	11	11
9/16	(Wales) Tesni Evans
[Bye]
(Finland) Emilia Soini	6	8	4
17/32	(Wales) Emily Whitlock	11	11	11
17/32	(Egypt) Zeina Mickawy	12	11	11
(Canada) Nicole Bunyan	10	8	8
[Bye]
2	(Egypt) Nouran Gohar

Second round
4	(Egypt) Hania El Hammamy	11	11	11
(Canada) Hollie Naughton	8	3	8
(France) Melissa Alves	6	11	11	4	11
(Belgium) Nele Gilis	11	6	8	11	8
(United States) Sabrina Sobhy	6	9
(Belgium) Tinne Gilis	11	4^{r}
(England) Jasmine Hutton	6	9	8
7	(New Zealand) Joelle King	11	11	11
5	(England) Sarah-Jane Perry	5	11	11	11
(France) Coline Aumard	11	6	5	8
(Egypt) Mariam Metwally	9	11	11	6	8
(Australia) Donna Lobban	11	9	2	11	11
(Wales) Tesni Evans	11	11	5	13
(Wales) Emily Whitlock	7	4	11	11
(Egypt) Zeina Mickawy	2	4	9
2	(Egypt) Nouran Gohar	11	11	11

Third round
4	(Egypt) Hania El Hammamy	11	11	14
(France) Melissa Alves	6	4	12
(United States) Sabrina Sobhy	1	9	13	11	11
7	(New Zealand) Joelle King	11	11	11	2	13
5	(England) Sarah-Jane Perry	12	11	11
(Australia) Donna Lobban	10	5	7
(Wales) Tesni Evans	7	11	3
2	(Egypt) Nouran Gohar	11	13	11

Quarter-finals
4	(Egypt) Hania El Hammamy	6	11	9	11	11
7	(New Zealand) Joelle King	11	5	11	4	4
Semi-finals
4	(Egypt) Hania El Hammamy	8	5	9
2	(Egypt) Nouran Gohar	11	11	11
5	(England) Sarah-Jane Perry	9	2	13	11
2	(Egypt) Nouran Gohar	11	11	11	13

== See also ==
- 2021 Men's British Open Squash Championship
