= British Junior Open Squash 2017 =

BJO 2017

Details
- Event name: British Junior Open 2016
- Location: Sheffield, England
- Venue: Hallamshire Squash Club; Abbeydale Park Club; Fulwood Sports Club
- Website squashsite.co.uk/bjo/

The British Junior Open 2017 is the edition of the 2017's British Junior Open Squash, which is a World Junior Squash Circuit Tier 2 event. The event took place in Sheffield in England from 2 to 6 January.

== Draw and results ==
Restricted from the quarter-final

=== Under 19 ===
==== Boys Under 19 ====
Quarter finals
9/16	(United States) Andrew Douglas	12	3	8	12
9/16	(India) Adhitya Raghavan	10	11	11	14
5/8	(England) Kyle Finch	11	11	8	7	8
(India) Abhay Singh	5	6	11	11	11
3/4	(France) Victor Crouin	11	8	9	8
5/8	(India) Velavan Senthilkumar	6	11	11	11
5/8	(Egypt) Abdallah Elmasry	11	11	9	6	4
2	(Egypt) Youssef Ibrahim	9	8	11	11	11

Semi-finals
9/16	(India) Adhitya Raghavan	10	8	8
(India) Abhay Singh	12	11	11
5/8	(India) Velavan Senthilkumar	11	11	11
2	(Egypt) Youssef Ibrahim	7	5	9

Final
(India) Abhay Singh	14	2	12	7
5/8	(India) Velavan Senthilkumar	16	11	10	11

==== Girls Under 19 ====
Quarter finals
1	(Egypt) Hania El Hammamy	12	11	11
5/8	(Japan) Satomi Watanabe	10	6	9
5/8	(Egypt) Mena Hamed	4	8	9
3/4	(Egypt) Nada Abbas	11	11	11
3/4	(Malaysia) Sivasangari Subramaniam	11	11	9	11
5/8	(Malaysia) Andrea Lee	5	9	11	7
5/8	(Egypt) Zeina Mickawy	11	11	9	6	7
2	(Egypt) Amina Yousry	6	7	11	11	10

Semi-finals
1	(Egypt) Hania El Hammamy	14	11	4	11
3/4	(Egypt) Nada Abbas	12	8	11	7
3/4	(Malaysia) Sivasangari Subramaniam	11	11	9	9	9
5/8	(England) Zeina Mickawy	6	6	11	11	11

Final
1	(Egypt) Hania El Hammamy	11	10	11	11
5/8	(Egypt) Zeina Mickawy	4	12	6	6

=== Under 17 ===
==== Boys Under 17 ====
Quarter finals
1	(Egypt) Yahya Elnawasany	11	11	11
9/16	(England) Adam Goad	8	3	2
9/16	(United States) Thomas Rosini	4	6	7
3/4	(England) Sam Todd	11	11	11
9/16	(Canada) Abdelrahman Dweek	11	11	11
17/32	(United States) Dana Santry	7	3	5
5/8	(Malaysia) Duncan Lee	10	11	12	11
2	(Egypt) Karim El Barbary	12	5	10	9

Semi-finals
1	(Egypt) Yahya Elnawasany	11	11	11
3/4	(England) Sam Todd	8	6	8
9/16	(Canada) Abdelrahman Dweek	11	10	7	6
5/8	(Malaysia) Duncan Lee	4	12	11	11

Final
1	(Egypt) Yahya Elnawasany	11	11
5/8	(Malaysia) Duncan Lee	9	3	5

==== Girls Under 15 ====
Quarter finals
1	(Egypt) Ingy Hammouda	8	11	5	8
5/8	(Egypt) Habiba Mohamed	11	9	11	11
5/8	(England) Elise Lazarus	11	12	11
3/4	(Malaysia) Aifa Azman	6	10	9
3/4	(Hong Kong) Hiu Lam Lui	11	11	11
5/8	(Netherlands) Elena Wagenmans	4	8	7
5/8	(Scotland) Georgia Adderley	5	8	11
2	(Egypt) Hana Ayoub	11	11	13

Semi-finals
5/8	(Egypt) Habiba Mohamed	8	11	5	9
5/8	(England) Elise Lazarus	11	7	11	11
3/4	(Hong Kong) Hiu Lam Lui	11	9	7	8
2	(Egypt) Hana Ayoub	8	11	11	11

Final
5/8	(England) Elise Lazarus	9	6	6
2	(Egypt) Hana Ayoub	11	11	11

== See also ==
- British Junior Open
- World Junior Squash Circuit
