= Tecnifibre =

French sporting equipment brand

- Type: Subsidiary
- Industry: Sports equipment
- Founded: 1979; 47 years ago
- Headquarters: Paris, France
- Products: Rackets and strings
- Owner: Lacoste (80%)
- Website: tecnifibre.com

Tecnifibre is a French manufacturer of sporting equipment, specializing in tennis and squash. It was founded in 1979 by the current CEO Thierry Maissant. Throughout its development, Tecnifibre has built itself a worldwide reputation in the tennis and squash market, releasing rackets, bags, strings, apparel and other accessories. Lacoste announced on 31 August 2017 acquisition of an 80% stake in the capital of Major Sports and became the owner of Tecnifibre on 1 October.

== History ==
Tecnifibre first became known for its expertise in strings, especially in multifilament, thanks to a unique technology: the "PU400 Inside". In 2004, Tecnifibre decided to launch its own range of rackets for competitors. In 2024, Tecnifibre invented the first t-shirt made from recycled tennis strings through a range of products called "X-Loop". Tecnifibre is also very active in squash.

=== Tennis rackets ===
- T-Fight ISO
- T-Fight RS
- TF40
- TF-X1 (previously T-Flash)
- Tempo (previously T-Rebound)

=== Padel rackets ===
- Wall Breaker
- Wall Master
- Curva

=== Tennis strings ===
[COPOLYESTER]:

- Black Code
- Black Code 4S
- Ice Code
- Razor Code
- Pro Red Code
- Pro Red Code Wax

[MULTIFILAMENT]:

- NRG2
- X-One Biphase
- Multifeel
- HDX Tour

[HYBRID]:

- Duramix HD
- Triax

=== Squash rackets ===
- Carboflex (125 / 130 / 135 grams)
- Suprem (125 / 130 / 135 grams)
- Dynergy (125 / 130 / 135 grams)
- Slash (120 / 125 / 130 / 135 grams)

== Sponsorships ==
=== Tennis ===
==== Men ====
- (Australia) John Millman
- (Australia) Omar Jasika
- (Australia) Marc Polmans
- (Belgium) Maxime Authom
- (Belgium) Jeroen Vanneste
- (China) Zhang Ze
- (China) Li Zhe
- (Croatia) Dino Marcan
- (France) Grégoire Barrère
- (France) Jérémy Chardy
- (France) Axel Michon
- (France) Armel Rancezot
- (France) Arthur Rinderknech
- (United Kingdom) Daniel Cox
- (Japan) Hiroki Moriya
- (Kazakhstan) Alexander Bublik
- (Netherlands) Tallon Griekspoor
- (New Zealand) Sabastian Lavie
- (Poland) Filip Peliwo
- (Russia) Daniil Medvedev
- (Serbia) Nikola Ćirić
- (Serbia) Janko Tipsarević
- (Slovenia) Aljaž Bedene
- (Spain) Nicolau Motilla
- (Sweden) Robin Olin
- (Sweden) Henrik Bengtsson
- (United States) Brian Michael Cernoch
- (United States) Devin Britton
- (United States) Christopher Eubanks
- (United States) Mitchell Krueger
- (Uzbekistan) Denis Istomin
- (France) Corentin Moutet

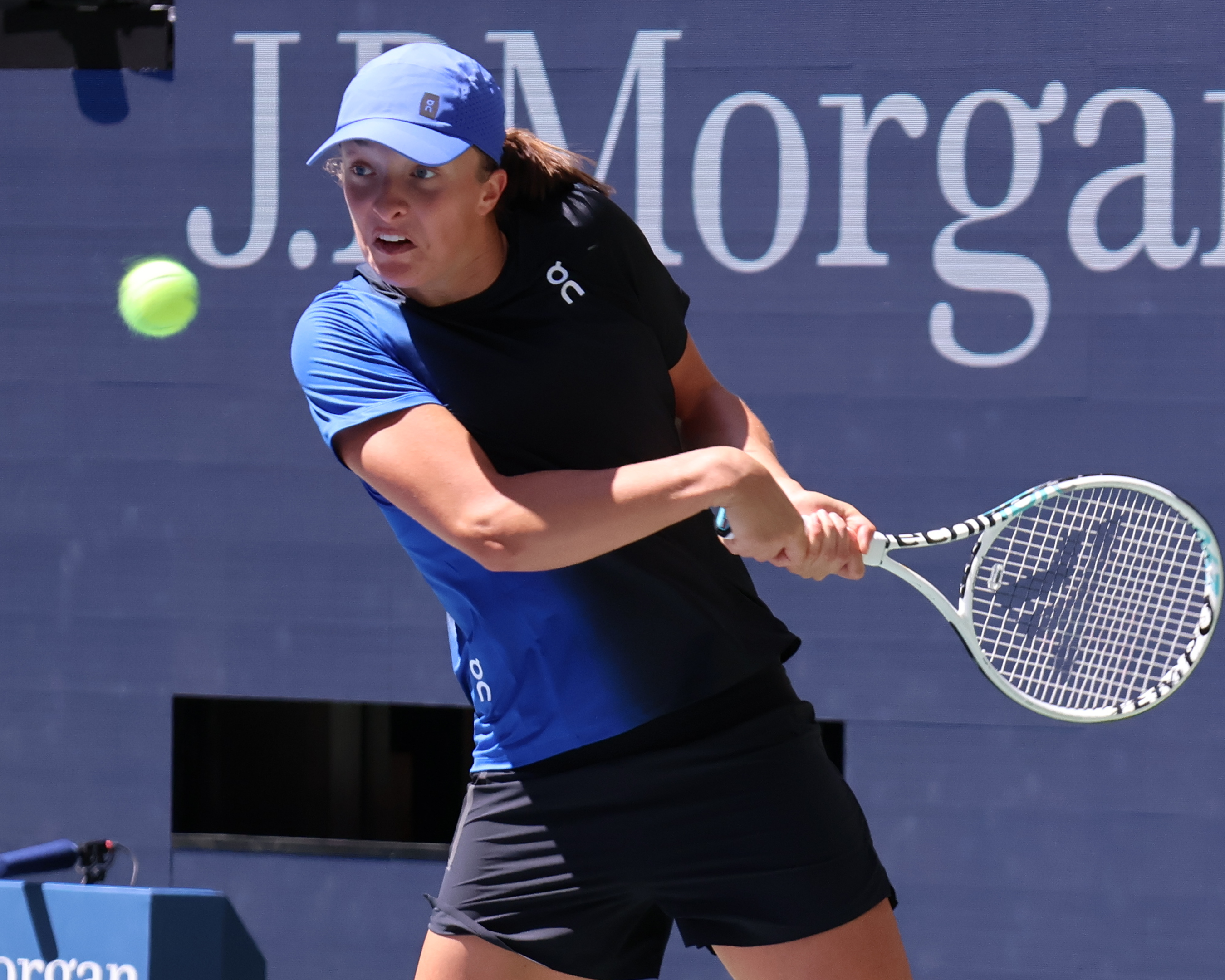
Iga Świątek using a Tecnifibre racquet at the 2023 US Open

==== Women ====
- (Belgium) Elise Mertens
- (Belgium) Maryna Zanevska
- (France) Elsa Jacquemot
- (France) Mathilde Johansson
- (Japan) Mai Hontama
- (Poland) Iga Świątek
- (United States) Danielle Collins
- (United States) Sachia Vickery

=== Squash ===
==== Men ====
- (Botswana) Alister Walker
- (Colombia) Miguel Ángel Rodríguez
- (Egypt) Ramy Ashour (Note: Only racquet strings.)
- (Egypt) Wael El Hindi
- (Egypt) Mohamed El Shorbagy
- (Egypt) Marwan El Shorbagy
- (Egypt) Osama Khalifa
- (England) Ben Coleman
- (England) Richie Fallows
- (England) Nathan Lake
- (France) Benjamin Aubert
- (France) Enzo Corigliano
- (France) Grégoire Marche
- (France) Auguste Dussourd
- (France) Thierry Lincou
- (Mexico) Alfredo Ávila
- (Pakistan) Farhan Zaman
- (United States) Christopher Gordon
- (United States) Andrew Douglas

==== Women ====
- (Egypt) Rowan Reda Araby
- (Egypt) Nour El Sherbini
- (Egypt) Heba El Torky
- (Egypt) Nouran Gohar
- (Egypt) Salma Hany
- (Egypt) Mayar Hany
- (Egypt) Hania El Hammamy
- (Egypt) Mariam Metwally
- (Egypt) Habiba Mohamed
- (England) Jenny Duncalf
- (England) Victoria Lust
- (India) Dipika Pallikal
- (Scotland) Alison Thomson
- (United States) Olivia Blatchford
