= 2021 Men's British Open Squash Championship =

British Open
- Men's British Open

Details
- Event name: 2021 Allam British Open
- Location: Hull, England
- Venue: University of Hull Sports Complex
- Dates: 16–22 August 2021

Men's Winner
- Prize money: $165,000
- Year: 2020–21 PSA World Tour

The Men's 2021 Allam British Open was the men's edition of the 2021 British Open Squash Championships, which is a 2020–21 PSA World Tour event. The event took place at the Sports Complex at the University of Hull in Hull in England between 16 and 22 August 2021. The event was sponsored by Dr Assem Allam.

The event was arranged for June instead of May because of the COVID-19 pandemic in the United Kingdom and then rearranged for August. The 2020 event had also been cancelled due to the pandemic.

New Zealand's Paul Coll defeated Egypt's Ali Farag and becomes first New Zealander to win the British Open men's squash title.

== Seeds ==
1. (Egypt) Ali Farag (runner-up)
2. (Egypt) Mohamed Elshorbagy (semi-finals)
3. (New Zealand) Paul Coll (champion)
4. (Egypt) Marwan Elshorbagy (quarter-finals)
5. (Egypt) Karim Abdel Gawad (second round)
6. (Egypt) Fares Dessouky (second round)
7. (Peru) Diego Elías (quarter-finals)
8. (Egypt) Mostafa Asal (quarter-finals)

== Draw and results ==
=== Semi-finals and final ===
Semi-finals
1	(Egypt) Ali Farag	11	11	11
(Colombia) Miguel Ángel Rodríguez	5	4	6
3	(New Zealand) Paul Coll	11	11	11
2	(Egypt) Mohamed Elshorbagy	8	7	5

Final
1	(Egypt) Ali Farag	11	6	6	8
3	(New Zealand) Paul Coll	6	11	11	11

=== Main Draw ===
==== Top half ====
First round
1	(Egypt) Ali Farag
[Bye]
[Bye]
9/16	(Scotland) Greg Lobban
9/16	(Egypt) Mohamed Abouelghar
[Bye]
[Bye]
9/16	(England) Adrian Waller
9/16	(Egypt) Omar Mosaad
[Bye]
(United States) Shahjahan Khan	8	7	11	12	6
17/32	(Qatar) Abdulla Mohd Al Tamimi	11	11	4	10	11
17/32	(England) George Parker	11	11	13
WC	(England) Sam Todd	7	7	11
[Bye]
8	(Egypt) Mostafa Asal
5	(Egypt) Karim Abdel Gawad
[Bye]
(France) Benjamin Aubert	6	4	4
17/32	(Malaysia) Eain Yow Ng	11	11	11
17/32	(England) Tom Richards	7	9	3
(United States) Todd Harrity	11	11	11
[Bye]
9/16	(Colombia) Miguel Ángel Rodríguez
17/32	(Germany) Raphael Kandra	12	11	8	11
(Egypt) Karim El Hammamy	10	6	11	3
(England) Ben Coleman	5	4	5
17/32	(France) Victor Crouin	11	11	11
17/32	(England) Daryl Selby	11	8	7	9
WC	(England) Nick Wall	8	11	11	11
[Bye]
4	(Egypt) Marwan ElShorbagy

Second round
1	(Egypt) Ali Farag	11	11	11	11
(Scotland) Greg Lobban	13	3	7	2
(Egypt) Mohamed Abouelghar	10	11	12	11
(England) Adrian Waller	12	9	10	7
(Egypt) Omar Mosaad	11	12	11
(Qatar) Abdulla Mohd Al Tamimi	2	10	5
(England) George Parker	3	4	8
8	(Egypt) Mostafa Asal	11	11	11
5	(Egypt) Karim Abdel Gawad	7	11	5	11	2
(Malaysia) Eain Yow Ng	11	7	11	7	11
(United States) Todd Harrity	8	9	4
(Colombia) Miguel Ángel Rodríguez	11	11	11
(Germany) Raphael Kandra	11	11	9	11
(France) Victor Crouin	9	6	11	9
(England) Nick Wall	7	8	11	8
4	(Egypt) Marwan ElShorbagy	11	11	9	11

Third round
1	(Egypt) Ali Farag	10	9	11	11	11
(Egypt) Mohamed Abouelghar	12	11	5	6	9
(Egypt) Omar Mosaad	8	3	6
8	(Egypt) Mostafa Asal	11	11	11
(Malaysia) Eain Yow Ng	13	13	12	11	4
(Colombia) Miguel Ángel Rodríguez	15	11	14	8	11
(Germany) Raphael Kandra	10	8	10
4	(Egypt) Marwan ElShorbagy	12	11	12

Quarter-finals
1	(Egypt) Ali Farag	9	11	7	12	11
8	(Egypt) Mostafa Asal	11	0	11	10	8
Semi-finals
1	(Egypt) Ali Farag	11	11	11
(Colombia) Miguel Ángel Rodríguez	5	4	6
(Colombia) Miguel Ángel Rodríguez	11	11	9	11	13
4	(Egypt) Marwan ElShorbagy	13	6	11	4	11

==== Bottom half ====
First round
3	(New Zealand) Paul Coll
[Bye]
(France) Sebastien Bonmalais	6	8	11	5
17/32	(Egypt) Youssef Ibrahim	11	11	9	11
9/16	(Egypt) Mazen Hesham
[Bye]
(Portugal) Rui Soares	11	3	5	5
17/32	(Switzerland) Nicolas Müller	9	11	11	11
9/16	(France) Gregoire Marche
[Bye]
(England) Nathan Lake	11	5	6	9
17/32	(Spain) Borja Golan	8	11	11	11
17/32	(France) Mathieu Castagnet	7	7	11	11	11
(India) Ramit Tandon	11	11	7	3	4
[Bye]
7	(Peru) Diego Elías
6	(Egypt) Fares Dessouky
[Bye]
(England) Richie Fallows	7	4	3
17/32	(Egypt) Youssef Soliman	11	11	11
17/32	(Scotland) Alan Clyne	11	11	11
(France) Auguste Dussourd	9	5	3
(Spain) Bernat Jaume	12	6	7	6
17/32	(Spain) Iker Pajares Bernabeu	10	11	11	11
17/32	(France) Baptiste Masotti	11	11	9	11
(England) Joshua Masters	3	1	11	2
(Switzerland) Dimitri Steinmann	11	6	11	11	9
17/32	(France) Lucas Serme	8	11	13	9	11
9/16	(Wales) Joel Makin
[Bye]
[Bye]
2	(Egypt) Mohamed Elshorbagy

Second round
3	(New Zealand) Paul Coll	11	11	12
(Egypt) Youssef Ibrahim	8	7	10
(Egypt) Mazen Hesham	11	11	11
(Switzerland) Nicolas Müller	7	4	7
(France) Gregoire Marche	11	11	11
(Spain) Borja Golan	8	9	8
(France) Mathieu Castagnet	7	11	6	3
7	(Peru) Diego Elías	11	2	11	11
6	(Egypt) Fares Dessouky	11	11	7	2	8
(Egypt) Youssef Soliman	7	5	11	11	11
(Scotland) Alan Clyne	4	3	11	11	7
(Spain) Iker Pajares Bernabeu	11	11	4	9	11
(France) Baptiste Masotti	11	7	11	3	11
(France) Lucas Serme	8	11	4	11	4
(Wales) Joel Makin	10	11	7	11	6
2	(Egypt) Mohamed Elshorbagy	12	6	11	3	11

Third round
3	(New Zealand) Paul Coll	5	12	7	11	11
(Egypt) Mazen Hesham	11	10	11	2	4
(France) Gregoire Marche	9	7	3
7	(Peru) Diego Elías	11	11	11
(Egypt) Youssef Soliman	w/o
(Spain) Iker Pajares Bernabeu
(France) Baptiste Masotti	7	11	11	7
2	(Egypt) Mohamed Elshorbagy	11	8	13	11

Quarter-finals
3	(New Zealand) Paul Coll	13	11	13
7	(Peru) Diego Elías	11	9	11
Semi-finals
3	(New Zealand) Paul Coll	11	11	11
2	(Egypt) Mohamed Elshorbagy	8	7	5
(Egypt) Youssef Soliman	4	11	7	12	7
2	(Egypt) Mohamed Elshorbagy	11	7	11	10	11

== See also ==
- 2021 Women's British Open Squash Championship
