= Lina El Tannir =

Egyptian squash player (born 1987)

Personal information
- Nicknames: Likaz; Lkz
- Born: October 23, 1987 (age 38) Cairo, Egypt
- Height: 1.70 m (5 ft 7 in)
- Weight: 52 kg (115 lb)

Sport
- Country: Egypt
- Handedness: Right Handed
- Turned pro: 2005
- Coached by: Talha Hussein; Akram Youssef; Mohamed Ismail
- Racquet used: Tecnifibre

Women's singles
- Highest ranking: No. 80 (October, 2006)
- Updated on December 22, 2009

Lina El Tannir (born October 23, 1987, in Cairo) is a former professional squash player who represented Egypt.

El Tannir started playing squash when she was twelve years old because her cousin, Heba Abu Ouf - former Egyptian national champion - and brother, Mohamed El Tannir, already did. Based at the Cairo's Gezira Club, she was coached by Talha Hussein, Mohamed Ismail and Akram Youssef.

As a junior, El Tannir won many national events and several international tournaments. These included the German Junior Open twice (2002 & 2005), the British Junior Open (2006). She was also runner up in the Dutch Junior Open in 2002. She also represented Egypt in the World Junior Team Championship in 2005.

El Tannir was ranked third in the national swimming team when she was twelve and second in the national gymnastics team when she was eight. El Tannir reached a career-high world professionals ranking of World No. 80 in October 2006.
