= Columbia Lions women's squash =

American college squash team

Columbia Lions Women's squash
- University: Columbia University
- Head coach: Jacques Swanepoel
- League: College Squash Association
- Conference: Ivy League
- Location: New York City, New York
- Venue: SL Green StreetSquash
- Nickname: Lions
- Colors: Columbia blue and white
- Website: gocolumbialions.com/sports/womens-squash

The Columbia Lions women's squash team is the intercollegiate women's squash team for Columbia University located in New York City, New York. The team competes in the Ivy League under the aegis of the College Squash Association. The team is coached by Jacques Swanepoel, Joanne Schickerling and Chris Sachvie.

== Annual results ==
Updated December 2019.

Season	Wins	Losses	National Rank
2010–2011	11	4	16th
2011–2012	6	11	13th
2012–2013	5	11	11th
2013–2014	8	7	10th
2014–2015	7	9	7th
2015–2016	6	9	8th
2016–2017	6	10	8th
2017–2018	10	7	7th
2018–2019	8	8	6th

== Players ==
=== 2019-2020 Roster ===
Lineup	Player	Year	Hometown	High School
7	Cao, Cindy	Fr.	Richmond, British Columbia	Magee Secondary School
9	Chen, Doria	Jr.	Wellesley, Massachusetts	Wellesley High School
	Dugel, Brenna	Fr.	Paradise Valley, Arizona	Phoenix Country Day School
	Dugel, Tara	Sr.	Paradise Valley, Arizona	Paradise Valley High School
6	Fox, Bunny	Fr.	Wellesley, Massachusetts	Wellesley High School
4	Kalgutkar, Jui	Sr.	Mumbai, Maharashtra	
2	Kendall, Nicole	Jr.	Richmond Hill, Ontario	JM Denison Secondary School
	Lentz, Elizabeth	Fr.	Philadelphia, Pennsylvania	Germantown Friends School
10	Masch, Julia	Jr.	Warren, New Jersey	The Pingry School
3	McGillicuddy, Erica	Fr.	Toronto, Ontario	Lawrence Park Collegiate Institute
5	McVeigh, Ellie	Fr.	Belfast, Northern Ireland	Methodist College Belfast
1	Mohamed, Habiba	Jr.	Alexandria, Egypt	Riada International School
8	Pincus, Jane	Jr.	Brooklyn, New York	Packer Collegiate Institute
	Sharma, Pranjali	So.	Pune, Maharashtra	St. Mary's School (Pune)
	Soper, Caroline	Jr.	New Haven, Connecticut	Choate Rosemary Hall

Updated December 2019.

== Notable alumni ==
- Tanvi Khanna: Class of 2018, 3x Second Team All-American, 3x First Team All-Ivy, HWR 68
- Colette Sultana: Class of 2017, Second Team All-American #121 PSA world ranking as of August 2020
