= Elisabet Sadó Garriga =

Spanish squash player (born 1981)

Personal information
- Born: September 22, 1981 (age 44) Barcelona, Catalonia, Spain

Sport
- Country: Spain
- Turned pro: 2007

Women's singles
- Highest ranking: No. 196 (November, 2007)
- Updated on December 22, 2009

Elisabet Sadó Garriga (born September 22, 1981 in Barcelona, Spain) is a former professional squash player who represented Spain. She is the British Open under 14, 16 and 19 Champion, seven times Spanish Champion and ten times Catalan Champion. She won the British Junior Open Squash Under-19 category in 1999. She reached a career-high ranking of World No. 196 in November 2007.
