= Israr Ahmed (squash player) =

Pakistani squash player (born 1997)

Personal information
- Born: 16 November 1997 (age 28) Lahore, Pakistan
- Height: 5 ft 7 in (170 cm)

Sport
- Country: Pakistan
- Coached by: Muhammad Imran
- Retired: Active
- Racquet used: Unsquashable
- Highest ranking: No. 90 (March 2021)
- Current ranking: No.390 (September 2024)
Medal record
Men's squash
Representing Pakistan
Asian Games
| Bronze medal – third place | 2018 Jakarta | Team |
- Updated on September 2024

Israr Ahmed (born 16 November 1997 in Lahore) is a Pakistani professional squash player. As of March 2021, he was ranked number 90 in the world and No. 2 in Pakistan. He is the winner of the 2012 British Junior Open Squash championship, in the U-15 category.
