= Safeer Ullah Khan =

Pakistani squash player (born 1985)

Personal information
- Born: April 7, 1985 (age 41) Peshawar, Pakistan
- Height: 1.62 m (5 ft 4 in)
- Weight: 54 kg (119 lb)

Sport
- Country: Pakistan
- Turned pro: 2001
- Coached by: Mehboob Khan
- Retired: Active
- Racquet used: Dunlop

Men's singles
- Highest ranking: No. 71 (February, 2004)
- Current ranking: No. 417 (December, 2009)
- Updated on December 22, 2009

Safeer Ullah Khan (Urdu: سفیر اللہ خان; born April 7, 1985, in Peshawar) is a professional squash player who represented Pakistan. He reached a career-high world ranking of World No. 71 in February 2004.
