= Hania El Hammamy =

Egyptian squash player (born 2000)

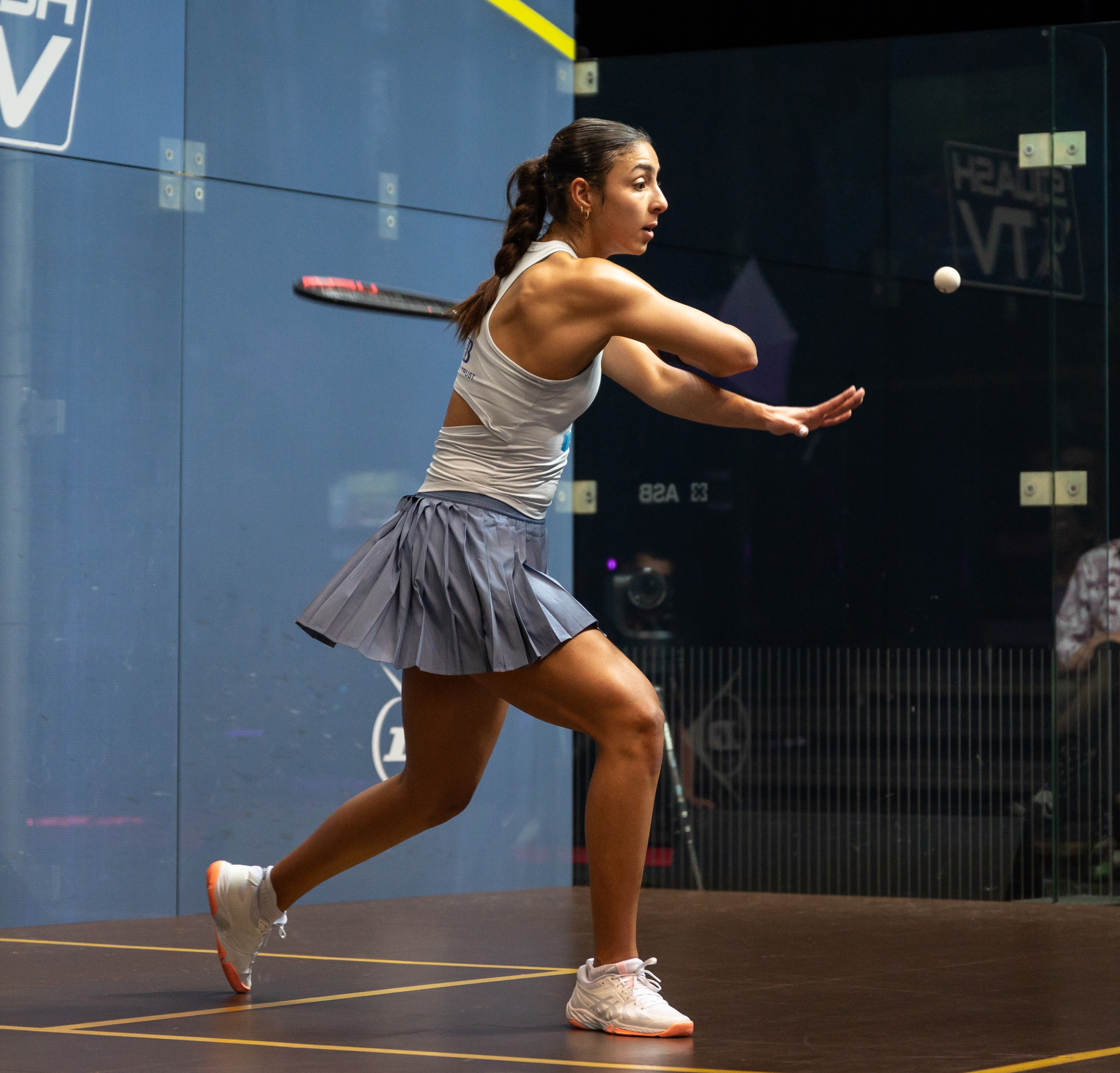
- Hania El Hammamy in 2024

Personal information
- Born: September 1, 2000 (age 26) Cairo, Egypt
- Height: 5 ft 6 in (168 cm)

Sport
- Country: Egyptian
- Handedness: Right Handed
- Turned pro: 2014
- Coached by: Omar Abdel Aziz
- Retired: Active
- Racquet used: HEAD

Women's singles
- Highest ranking: No. 1 (November 2025)
- Current ranking: No. 1 (February 2026)
- Title: 19
- World Open: 4
Medal record
Women's squash
Representing Egypt
World Championships
Silver medal – second place	2025 Chicago	Singles
Bronze medal – third place	2019–20 Cairo	Singles
Bronze medal – third place	2023 Chicago	Singles
Bronze medal – third place	2024 Cairo	Singles
World Team Championships
Gold medal – first place	2022 Cairo	Team
Gold medal – first place	2024 Hong Kong	Team

Hania El Hammamy (Arabic: هَانِيَا الْهَمَّامِيّ; born 1 September 2000) is an Egyptian professional squash player. She became a top seed in women's junior squash rankings at the age of 16. In November 2025, she reached the number 1 ranking in the world.

== Biography ==
El Hammamy started playing squash at the age of seven, after being inspired by her brother Karim El Hammamy who is also a professional squash player. She completed a degree in marketing at The American University in Cairo.

== Career ==
El Hammamy lost to Satomi Watanabe in the quarterfinals of the girls under-13 final of the British Junior Open Squash 2012. She triumphed in the girls under-13 division of the British Junior Open Squash in 2013. She emerged as runners-up to Sivasangari Subramaniam in the girls under-15 final at the British Junior Open Squash 2014. She took part in the 2015–16 PSA World Tour and became the second youngest squash player to attend the Professional Squash Association World Tour at the age of 14 just behind her compatriot Habiba Mohamed Ahmed Alymohmed.

She defeated England's Fiona Moverley in the final of the Geneva Open in March 2015. She was unbeaten in the 2015 Geneva Open without losing a single game during the tournament. She eventually became the first player born in the 21st century to have won a PSA tour title. She emerged as the winner of the girls under-15 at the British Junior Open Squash 2015. She reached quarterfinals of the 2015 Women's World Junior Squash Championships before being knocked out by compatriot Habiba Mohamed.

She reached semifinals at the 2016 Women's World Junior Squash Championships and was knocked out by Rowan El Araby from the tournament. She also took part at the 2016 Women's World Open Squash Championship but lost to her compatriot Nour El Tayeb in the first round of the tournament. She won the under-17 title at the British Junior Open Squash 2016. She competed in the 2017 Women's World Junior Squash Championships as world no 1 seed and emerged as runners-up in the women's singles individual final to her rival Rowan Elaraby. She was also part of the team which emerged as champions at the 2017 Women's World Junior Team Squash Championships After defeating Malaysia 2–0 in the final.

She rose to prominence after her stunning victory over eight time world champion Nicol David of Malaysia in the first round of the Windy City Open in 2018. She trailed Nicol David 2-0 but bounced back strongly to knock Nicol out from the competition. Hania's triumph was considered as a massive upset in squash arena as it marked Nicol's first defeat in the first round of a competitive World Series tournament in nearly 16 years.

In May 2018, she entered the top 20 rankings for the first time in her professional career at the age of seventeen. In July 2018, she lost the women's singles final against Rowan Elaraby at the 2018 Women's World Junior Squash Championships. It was also Hania's second successive defeat in a World Junior Squash Championship final and Rowan won her second consecutive world title. She was knocked out by her compatriot Raneem El Weleily from the second round of the 2018–19 PSA Women's World Squash Championship.

She won her first world junior championship title at the 2019 Women's World Junior Squash Championships after defeating her fellow Egyptian Jana Shiha in the final. She was a key member of the Egyptian side which defended the Women's World Junior Team Squash Championships in 2019 and it was also Egypt's seventh successive title at the Women's Junior Team Squash Championships since 2007.

In December 2019, she broke into the top 10 rankings after her impressive performances during the CIB PSA Women's World Championship where she reached semifinals. In the quarterfinals of the CIB PSA Women's World Championship, she defeated world no 4 seed Camille Serme despite losing the first two games to her opponent and advanced for her first semi final. She lost to Nour El Sherbini in the semi-finals of the 2019–20 PSA Women's World Squash Championship. She was awarded the Young Player of the Year for the 2019/20 season at the PSA Women's Awards.

In March 2020, she won her first platinum tournament at the age of 19 after defeating her compatriot Nour El Sherbini in the final of the Black Ball Squash Open. She also became one of the youngest players to have won a major title in the history of PSA World Tour and she also registered her first ever win against Nour El Sherbini in a competitive match after previously losing all three matches. In December 2020, she lost to England's Sarah-Jane Perry in the final of the Black Ball Squash Open despite having an early advantage in the final. In the final, Hania won the first two games 11–4, 11-9 but lost the next three games 9–11, 10-12 and 9–11. She emerged as the winner of the 2020 Women's PSA World Tour Finals which was also her maiden PSA World Tour Finals title. She defeated her country-mate Nour El Tayeb in the 2020 PSA World Tour Finals 9–11, 9–11, 11–9, 11–4, 11–3.

She claimed the 2021 Manchester Open after defeating Sarah-Jane Perry in the women's singles final. She also won the Women's El Gouna International 2021 after defeating Nouran Gohar in the final. She failed to defend her PSA World Tour Finals in 2021 after losing to her compatriot Nouran Gohar in the final 11–9, 11–6, 8–11, 11–8. She once again lost in a four-game defeat to Gohar in the US Open final in 2021.

In 2022, she was part of the Egyptian team that won the 2022 Women's World Team Squash Championships. In May 2023, she reached the semi final of the 2023 PSA Women's World Squash Championship, before losing to the number 1 seed Nouran Gohar in 5 games.

After reaching the semi-final round at the 2024 PSA Women's World Squash Championship, losing out to Nouran Gohar, Hammamy helped Egypt win their fourth consecutive title at the December 2024 Women's World Team Squash Championships.

In March 2025, Hammamy won her 15th PSA title after securing victory in the OptAsia Championships during the 2024–25 PSA Squash Tour. In May 2025, Hammamy reached the final of the 2025 Women's World Squash Championship in Chicago, but was defeated by Nour El Sherbini who won her record equalling eighth world title.

In October 2025, she won her 18th PSA title after securing victory in the US Open during the 2025–26 PSA Squash Tour and shortly afterwards reached the world ranking of number 1 in October 2025. Another title followed in January 2026 after she won the Tournament of Champions. As the number 1 seed, she reached the semi-finals of the 2026 World Championship.

== See also ==
- Official Women's Squash World Ranking
