= Sara Badr =

Egyptian squash player (born 1987)

Personal information
- Born: 27 June 1987 (age 39) Alexandria, Egypt

Sport
- Country: Egypt
- Turned pro: 2003
- Racquet used: Harrow

Women's singles
- Highest ranking: No. 65 (February 2004)
- Updated on 22 December 2009

Sara Badr (born 27 June 1987) is a professional squash player who represented Egypt. She reached a career-high world ranking of World No. 65 in February 2004. She is currently a marketing professional at Microsoft in the UAE.
