= Yasser El Halaby =

Egyptian squash player (born 1984)

Personal information
- Born: 30 September 1984 (age 41) Cairo, Egypt
- Height: 1.73 m (5 ft 8 in)
- Weight: 72 kg (159 lb)

Sport
- Country: Egypt
- Turned pro: 2000
- Retired: Active
- Racquet used: Dunlop

Men's singles
- Highest ranking: No. 40 (February 2008)
- Current ranking: No. 77 (December 2009)
- Updated on 22 December 2009

Yasser El Halaby (born 30 September 1984 in Cairo) is an Egyptian professional squash player.

== Career ==
El Halaby attended Princeton University from 2002 to 2006. He won the College Squash Association individual championships an unprecedented four straight times. He also was a member of a squad that almost toppled the Trinity College (Connecticut) squash team's 100+ match win streak, but he failed to convert four match balls against Freshman Gustav Detter and lost (it later emerged that El Halaby was competing with two torn Achilles tendons).

El Halaby has represented Egypt at the international level. He reached a career-high ranking of World No. 40 in February 2008.
