= Omar Refaat =

Egyptian squash player

Omar Refaat is a former professional squash player who represented Egypt. He joined Professional Squash Association in 2002. Refaat reached a career-high world ranking of World No. 116 in April 2003.
