= World Junior Squash Circuit =

WSF World Junior Circuit

Details
- Event name: World Junior Circuit
- Website wsf.tournamentsoftware.com/ranking/ranking.aspx?rid=101

The World Junior Squash Circuit is the premier level for worldwide competition among under-19 junior squash players organised by the World Squash Federation. Mirroring the PSA and WSA circuits, the World Junior Circuit ranks players and every year is organized the World Junior Squash Championships.

== Tournament Tiers ==
Just like the PSA, junior tournaments are divided into different levels. Tier 1 is the World Championships, Tier 2 : Regional Championships (e.g. European, Asian Junior Individual) + top level sub regionals such as British & US Junior Opens. And Tier 3 : All other sub regionals.

The point distribution for each level of tournaments is as follows:

| Description | Winner | Finalist | Semifinalist | Quarterfinalists | Round16 | Round32 |
|---|---|---|---|---|---|---|
| Tier 1 | 200 | 140 | 80 | 40 | 20 | 10 |
| Tier 2 | 125 | 78 | 50 | 25 | 12 | 6 |
| Tier 3 | 75 | 45 | 28 | 13 | 7 | - |

== Tournament List ==
| Month | Location | Tournament | Tier |
|---|---|---|---|
| January | England | British Junior Open | Tier 2 |
| January | Scotland | Scottish Junior Open | Tier 3 |
| January | Czech Republic | Czech Junior Open | Tier 3 |
| February | Liechtenstein | Liechtenstein Junior Open | Tier 3 |
| February | France | French Junior Open | Tier 3 |
| March | Austria | Austrian Junior Open | Tier 3 |
| March | Qatar | Qatar Junior Open | Tier 3 |
| March | Wales | Welsh Junior Open | Tier 3 |
| April | Europe | European Junior Championships | Tier 2 |
| April | Australia | Australian Junior Open | Tier 3 |
| April | Africa | African Junior Championships | Tier 3 |
| April | Norway | Norwegian Junior Open | Tier 3 |
| April | Croatia | Croatian Junior Open | Tier 3 |
| April | Luxembourg | Luxembourg Junior Open | Tier 3 |
| April | Jordan | Jordan Junior Open | Tier 3 |
| May | Pakistan | Pakistan Junior Open | Tier 3 |
| May | Ukraine | Ukraine Junior Open | Tier 3 |
| June | Malaysia | Penang Junior Open | Tier 2 |
| June | America | Panamerican Junior Championships | Tier 2 |
| June | Italy | Italian Junior Open | Tier 3 |
| June | Asia | Asian Junior Championships | Tier 2 |
| June | Portugal | Portuguese Junior Open | Tier 3 |
| July | Oceania | Oceanian Junior Championships | Tier 2 |

| Month | Location | Tournament | Tier |
|---|---|---|---|
| July | Germany | German Junior Open | Tier 3 |
| July | Netherlands | Dutch Junior Open | Tier 2 |
| July | Caribbean | Caribbean Junior Championships | Tier 3 |
| July | Spain | Spanish Junior Open | Tier 3 |
| August | Japan | Japan Junior Open | Tier 3 |
| August | World | World Junior Championships | Tier 1 |
| August | Hong Kong | Hong Kong Junior Open | Tier 2 |
| August | India | Indian Junior Open | Tier 3 |
| September | Iran | Iran Junior Open | Tier 3 |
| September | Finland | Finnish Junior Open | Tier 3 |
| September | Argentina | Argentina Junior Open | Tier 3 |
| September | Slovakia | Slovak Junior Open | Tier 3 |
| October | Serbia | Serbian Junior Open | Tier 3 |
| October | Denmark | Danish Junior Open | Tier 3 |
| October | Sweden | Nordic Junior Open | Tier 3 |
| October | Hungary | Hungarian Junior Open | Tier 3 |
| November | Belgium | Belgian Junior Open | Tier 3 |
| November | Poland | Polish Junior Open | Tier 3 |
| November | Ireland | Irish Junior Open | Tier 3 |
| November | Pakistan | Roshan Khan Junior Open | Tier 3 |
| December | Switzerland | Swiss Junior Open | Tier 3 |
| December | Canada | Canadian Junior Open | Tier 3 |
| December | United States | US Junior Open | Tier 2 |

== Current junior world top 10 players ==
=== Boys U19 ===
| Rank | November 2015 | |
|---|---|---|
| 1 | (Peru) Diego Elías | 175.00 |
| 2 | (Egypt) Youssef Soliman | 101.67 |
| 3 | (Malaysia) Eain Yow Ng | 79.33 |
| 4 | (Japan) Ryunosuke Tsukue | 73.33 |
| 5 | (Pakistan) Israr Ahmed | 68.33 |
| 5 | (England) Patrick Rooney | 68.33 |
| 7 | (Egypt) Saadeldin Ehab Abouaish | 68.33 |
| 8 | (Switzerland) Dimitri Steinmann | 66.67 |
| 9 | (Iran) Sajad Zareian | 56.67 |
| 10 | (Australia) Solayman Nowrozi | 56.67 |

=== Girls U19 ===
| Rank | November 2015 | |
|---|---|---|
| 1 | (Egypt) Nouran Ahmed Gohar | 175.00 |
| 2 | (England) Georgina Kennedy | 98.33 |
| 3 | (Egypt) Habiba Mohamed | 93.33 |
| 4 | (Malaysia) Andrea Jia Qi Lee | 86.67 |
| 5 | (Australia) Lakeesha Rarere | 81.67 |
| 6 | (Belgium) Tinne Gilis | 77.00 |
| 7 | (Switzerland) Cindy Merlo | 75.00 |
| 8 | (Egypt) Salma Hany Ibrahim | 70.00 |
| 9 | (Sweden) Nanna Carleke | 59.00 |
| 10 | (New Zealand) Eleanor Epke | 57.67 |

== See also ==
- World Squash Federation
- World Junior Squash Championships
- PSA World Tour
