= Cristina Gómez (squash player) =

Spanish squash player (born 1998)

Cristina Gomez
Personal information
- Born: 6 July 1998 (age 28) San Pedro del Pinatar, Spain

Sport
- Country: Spain
- Handedness: Right Handed
- Retired: Active
- Racquet used: Hit Rackets

Women's singles
- Highest ranking: No. 48 (February 2022)
- Current ranking: No. 57 (December 2022)
- Updated on December 2022

Cristina Gomez (born 6 July 1998 in San Pedro del Pinatar) is a Spanish professional squash player. As of February 2022, she was ranked number 48 in the world. She is in the Spain women's national squash team.
