= Ahmad Al-Saraj =

Jordanian squash player

Personal information
- Born: March 2, 1995 (age 31) Amman, Jordan
- Height: 1.75 m (5 ft 9 in)
- Weight: 57 kg (126 lb)

Sport
- Country: Jordan
- Turned pro: 2010
- Coached by: Sa'ad Hijazi
- Retired: Active
- Racquet used: Tecnifibre

Men's singles
- Highest ranking: No. 93 (February 2014)
- Current ranking: No. 345 (January 2018)
- Updated on January 2018

Ahmad Al-Saraj (born March 2, 1995) is a professional squash player who represented Jordan. He reached a career-high world ranking of World No. 93 in February 2014.

He became the 2014 British Junior Open Squash in the under-19 category, to become the first Jordanian winner of the Drysdale Cup.
