= Shehab Essam =

Egyptian squash player (born 1995)

Personal information
- Born: June 24, 1995 (age 31) Oman

Sport
- Country: Egypt
- Handedness: Right Handed
- Turned pro: 2013
- Retired: Active
- Racquet used: Prince
- Highest ranking: No. 70 (September 2019)
- Updated on 1 September 2019

Shehab Essam Hosny (born 24 June 1995) is an Egyptian professional squash player. Essam turned professional in 2013. He reached a career high ranking of number 70 in the world during September 2019.
