= Nick Wall (squash player) =

English squash player (born 2000)

Personal information
- Born: 24 February 2000 (age 26) Sheffield, England

Sport
- Country: England
- Handedness: Left Handed
- Retired: Active
- Racquet used: Dunlop

Men's singles
- Highest ranking: No. 31 (October 2023)
- Current ranking: No. 41 (14 July 2025)
- Title: 8
Medal record
Men's squash
Representing England
European Team Championships
Gold medal – first place	2023 Helsinki	Team

Nick Wall (born 24 February 2000) is an English professional squash player. He reached a career high ranking of 31 in the world during October 2023.

== Career ==
Wall joined the PSA Tour in 2016 and won his first title in 2019, when he won the Life Time Vegas Open.

By 2021 he had reached the world's top 100 players and won the Gibraltar Open, Swiss Open and Uster Cup. In February 2023, he hit a career best world ranking (at the time) of 45. He was a member of the England team that won the 2023 European Squash Team Championships.

In 2024, Wall won his 10th PSA title after securing victory in the Northern Open. In 2025, Wall reached the final of the British National Squash Championships title, losing out to Joel Makin in the final.
