= Yahya Elnawasany =

Egyptian squash player (born 2002)

Personal information
- Born: 9 January 2002 (age 24) Tanta, Egypt

Sport
- Country: Egypt
- Turned pro: 2018
- Retired: Active
- Racquet used: Head

Men's singles
- Highest ranking: No. 29 (February 2026)
- Current ranking: No. 29 (February 2026)
- Title: 5

Yahya Elnawasany (born 9 January 2002) is an Egyptian professional squash player. He reached a career high ranking of 29 in the world during February 2026.

== Biography ==
Elnawasany won his first professional title in the 2020 Egyptian Squash Tour.

In February 2026, he won his 5th PSA title and first since the 2021–22 season, after securing victory in the Goodfellow Classic during the 2025–26 PSA Squash Tour.
