= Marie Stephan =

French squash player (born 1996)

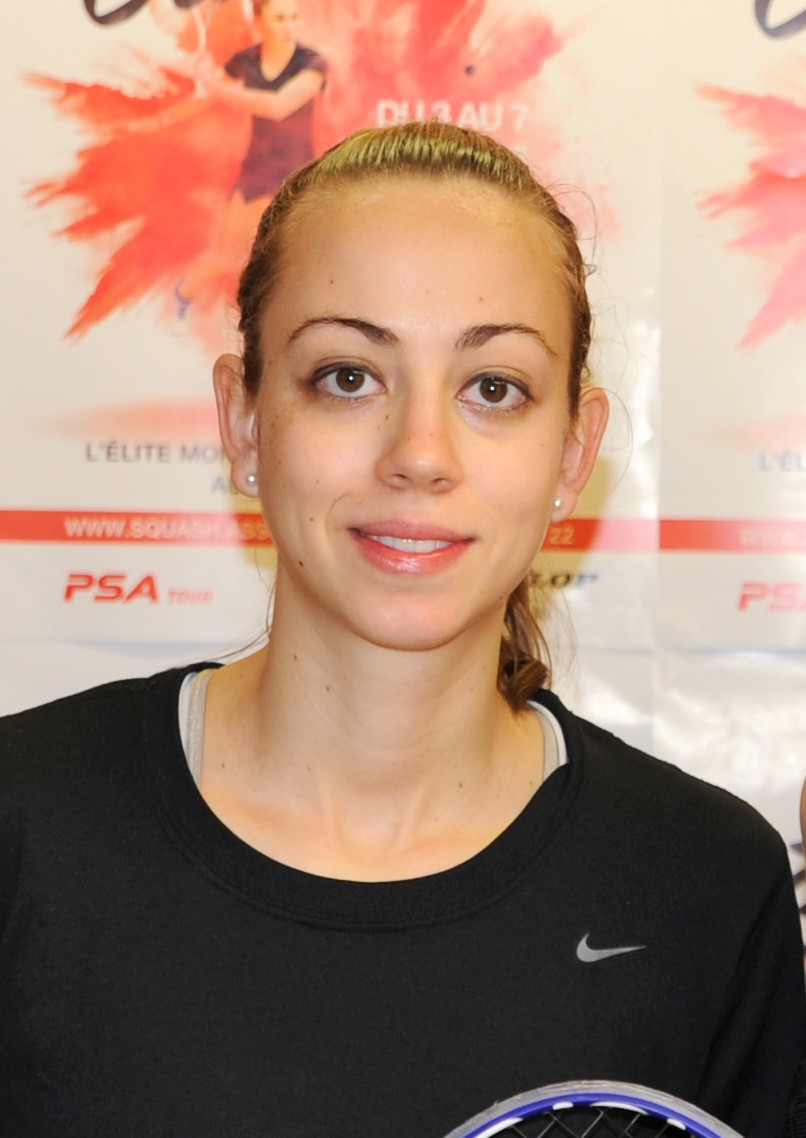
- Marie Stephan, Monte Carlo Squash Classic 2018

Personal information
- Born: 14 March 1996 (age 30) Cayenne, French Guiana

Sport
- Country: France
- Handedness: Right Handed
- Turned pro: 2015
- Coached by: Philippe Signoret
- Retired: Active
- Racquet used: Tecnifibre

Women's singles
- Highest ranking: No. 44 (10 February 2025)
- Current ranking: No. 48 (14 July 2025)
- Title: 1
- Tour final: 1
Medal record
Women's squash
Representing France
World Games
Silver medal – second place	2025 Chengdu	Singles
- Updated on February 2022

Marie Stephan (born 14 March 1996) is a professional squash player who represents France. She reached a career-high world ranking of World No. 53 in February 2022.
