= Habiba Mohamed Ahmed Alymohmed =

Egyptian squash player

Personal information
- Born: May 29, 1999 (age 27) Alexandria, Egypt

Sport
- Handedness: Right Handed
- Turned pro: 2013
- Coached by: Jacques Swanepoel
- Racquet used: Tecnifibre

Women's singles
- Highest ranking: No. 18 (June, 2015)
- Updated on December, 2019

Habiba Mohamed Ahmed Alymohmed is an Egyptian squash player who played on the Professional Squash Association (PSA) tour from 2011 to 2015. Her accomplishments as a player include five British Junior Open titles, four professional tournament wins and being runner-up in two professional events. She also recorded four wins against top 10 players. In fall 2017, she enrolled at Columbia University and played on the women's team.

== Early life and education ==
Mohamed was born May 29, 1999, in Egypt and attended Riada International School in Alexandria, Egypt. Her sister Farida Mohamed is also a professional squash player and, as of December 2019, was ranked #55 in the world.

== Professional Tour Experience ==
In 2013, as a 14 year old, Mohamed won the Malaysian Tour Grand Final, making her the youngest player ever to win a tour title. She followed that up with titles at the 2014 Edinburgh and Paderborn Opens before she won the 2014 World Junior Championship, a tournament in which she defeated both Nour El Sherbini and Nouran Gohar. Her first International 25k win came at the 2014 Atlantis Open where, as the 6th seed, she defeated Nour El Tayeb in an all-Egyptian final to take home the crown. Mohamed reached the final of the 2015 HKFC International tournament, losing to Annie Au. Her strong performance throughout her professional career led to a #18 world ranking, making her the youngest ever to reach top 20 to date. Despite her very young age, Mohamed managed to beat world top 5 players, making her one of the most successful female squash players.

== Collegiate career ==
For the 2017-2018 Columbia University college season, her first, she played primarily at the #5 position (of 9 players in a collegiate lineup) and recorded an 11–6 record in Ivy League play. The 2018–2019 season saw her playing at the number 2 and 3 positions. She was named as a Second Team All American for the 2018–2019 season. She began her third year (the 2019–2020 season) playing at the number one team position. For the 2019-2020 Columbia University college season, she played at the #1 position. She was the first ever Columbia Squash woman to be named as a First Team All American for the 2019–2020 season. Mohamed suffered serious knee and shoulder injuries during her collegiate career, yet she managed to become one of the best collegiate players and went undefeated in her final season.

== Major results ==
Outcome	Event	Year	Opponent in the final	Score in the final
Winner	British Junior Open U13	2011	(Malaysia) Andrea Lee	11–3, 11–8, 12-10
Winner	British Junior Open U13	2012	(Egypt) Amina Yousry	11–8, 11–8, 11-3
Winner	British Junior Open U15	2013	(Malaysia) Sivasangari Subramaniam	11–8, 11–6, 14-12
Winner	Malaysian Tour Grand Final	2013	(Hong Kong) Tong Tsz Wing	11–4, 11–8, 11-6
Winner	British Junior Open U17	2014	(Egypt) Hana Ramadan	11–6, 11–3, 11-4
Winner	Edinburgh Open	2014	(France) Coline Aumard	11–4, retired
Winner	Paderborn Open	2014	(Scotland) Lisa Aitken	11–5, 11–6, 11-6
Winner	WSF World Junior Championship	2014	(Egypt) Nouran Gohar	6–11, 11–2, 11–7, 11-6
Winner	Atlantis Open	2014	(Egypt) Nour El Tayeb	11–13, 11–8, 11–5, 11-7
Runner Up	HKFC International	2015	(Hong Kong) Annie Au	7–11, 11–8, 11–9, 4–11, 8-11
Runner Up	NSCI Open	2015	(India) Joshna Chinappa	8–11, 9–11, 6-11
Runner Up	WSF World Junior Championship	2015	(Egypt) Nouran Gohar	6-11, 11–7, 7–11, 15-17
