= Richie Fallows =

English squash player (born 1995)

Personal information
- Born: 17 June 1995 (age 31) London, England
- Height: 6 ft 2 in (1.88 m)

Sport
- Country: England
- Coached by: Ben Ford
- Racquet used: Tecnifibre

Men's singles
- Highest ranking: No. 50 (November 2015)
- Current ranking: No. 53 (February 2021)
- Title: 5
- Updated on February 2021

Richie Fallows (born 17 June 1995 in London) is a professional squash player. He has represented England in international competitions. He reached a career-high world ranking of 50 in December 2015
