= Nadine Shahin =

Egyptian squash player (born 1997)

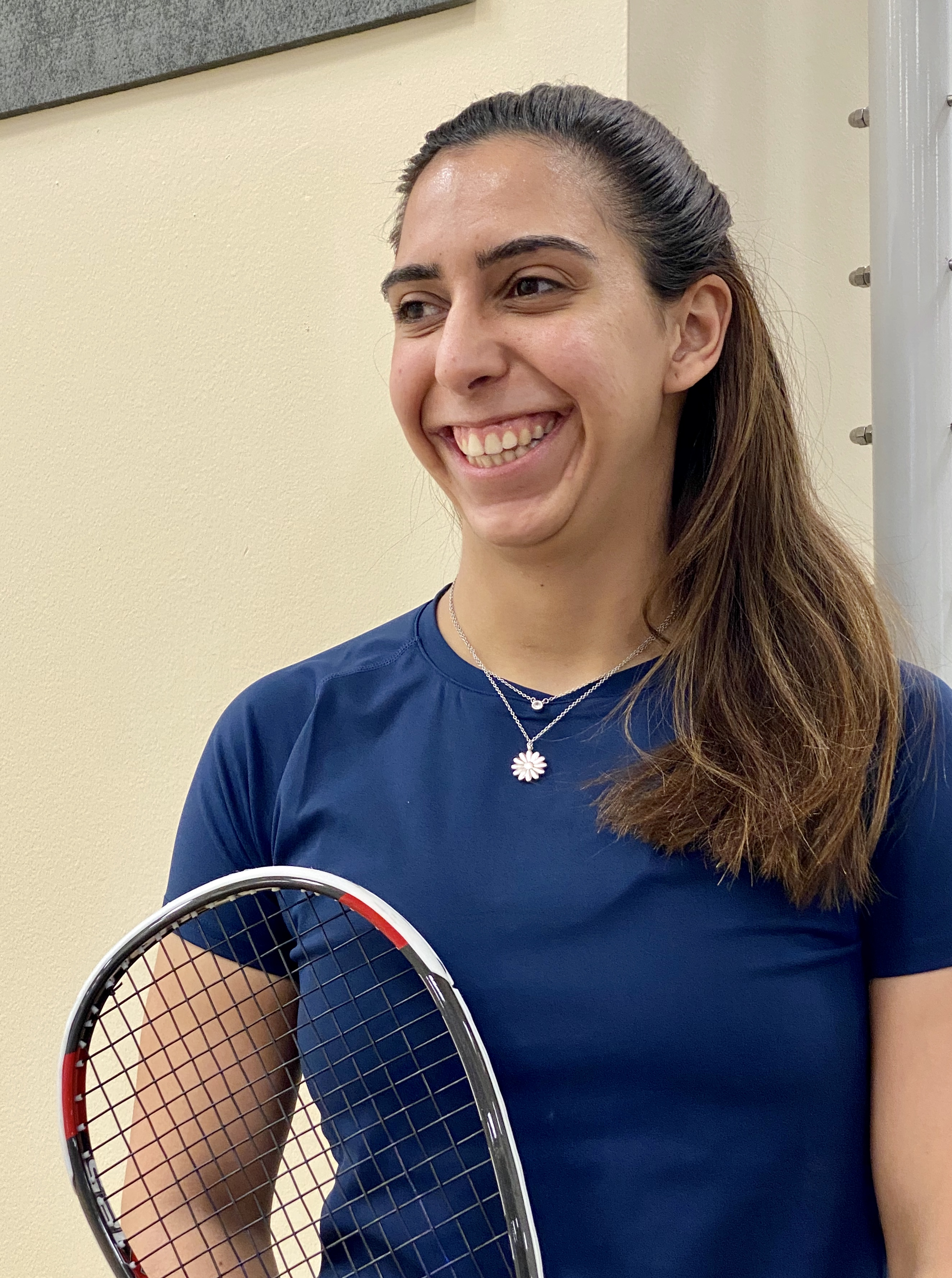
- Shahin In 2020

Personal information
- Born: June 14, 1997 (age 29) Cairo, Egypt

Sport
- Country: Egypt
- Handedness: Right Handed
- Turned pro: 2011
- Coached by: Mahmoud abdel Kader
- Retired: Active
- Racquet used: Tecnifibre

Women's singles
- Highest ranking: No. 14 (September 2021)
- Current ranking: No. 44 (14 July 2025)
- Updated on September, 2024

Nadine Shahin, also known as Nadine Ayman Shahin and Nadine Ayman Mohamed Shahin (born 14 June 1997 in Cairo) is an Egyptian professional squash player. As of September 2024, she was ranked number 40 in the world.
