= Rowan Reda Araby =

Egyptian squash player (born 2000)

Personal information
- Born: 29 July 2000 (age 25) Alexandria, Egypt
- Height: 5 ft 4 in (163 cm)
- Weight: 121 lb (55 kg)

Sport
- Country: Egypt
- Handedness: Right handed
- Turned pro: 2016
- Retired: Active
- Racquet used: Tecnifibre

Women's singles
- Highest ranking: No. 7 (June 2022)
- Current ranking: No. 11 (14 July 2025)
Medal record
Women's squash
Representing Egypt
World Team Championships
Gold medal – first place	2024 Hong Kong	Team
Junior World Championships
Gold medal – first place	2018 Chennai	Singles
Gold medal – first place	2017 Tauranga	Singles
Silver medal – second place	2016 Bielsko-Biala	Singles

Rowan Reda Araby or Rowan Elaraby (born 29 July 2000) is an Egyptian professional squash player. She is a world team champion and reached her career-high ranking of number 7 in the world in June 2022.

== Career ==
Araby is the 2017 and 2018 World Junior Champion, defeating her Egyptian compatriot Hania El Hammamy on both occasions. The previous year, 2016, Araby lost in the final to Nouran Gohar. Araby won the 2022 Carol Weimoller Women's Squash Championship for the first time, after defeating Malaysia's Sivasangari Subramaniam 3–1.

As the ninth seed she reached the quarter-final round at the 2024 PSA Women's World Squash Championship. In December 2024, Araby helped Egypt win their fourth consecutive title at the 2024 Women's World Team Squash Championships.

== See also ==
- Official Women's Squash World Ranking
