= Sam Todd (squash player) =

British squash player (born 2003)

Personal information
- Born: 21 March 2003 (age 23) Leeds, England

Sport
- Country: British (English)
- Handedness: Right-handed
- Retired: Active
- Racquet used: Dunlop

Men's singles
- Highest ranking: 46 (May 2026)
- Current ranking: 46 (May 2026)
Medal record
Representing England
European Team Championships
Gold medal – first place	2026 Amsterdam	Team

Sam Todd (born 21 March 2003) is an English professional squash player. He reached a career high ranking of 46 in the world during May 2026.

== Career ==
Todd won the 2021 Pontefract Men's Challenger.

In January 2025, Todd won his 6th PSA title after securing victory in the Gas City Pro-Am during the 2024–25 PSA Squash Tour and quickly followed that success by winning a 7th at the Chicago Open the following month on 9 February. Todd continued his good form when in March 2025, he won the Lethbridge ProAm, which propelled his world ranking up 160 places.

In May 2026, he won the 2026 European Team Championships in Amsterdam with England.
