= Marwan Tarek =

Egyptian squash player (born 2000)

Personal information
- Born: January 30, 2000 (age 26) Cairo, Egypt

Sport
- Country: Egypt
- Turned pro: 2017
- Retired: Active
- Racquet used: Head

Men's singles
- Highest ranking: No. 153 (September 2017)
- Current ranking: No. 153 (November 2020)
- Title: 1
- Tour final: 1
- Updated on December 2019

Marwan Tarek (born 30 January 2000 in Cairo) is an Egyptian professional squash player. As of December 2019, he was ranked number 262 in the world, his highest-ever ranking till then. He won the 2019 CIB Egyptian Tour professional tournament. He competed for the Harvard Crimson men's squash team, where he was named the 2023 male athlete of the year and the Skillman Award by the CSA.
