= Hana Ramadan =

Egyptian professional squash player (born 1997)

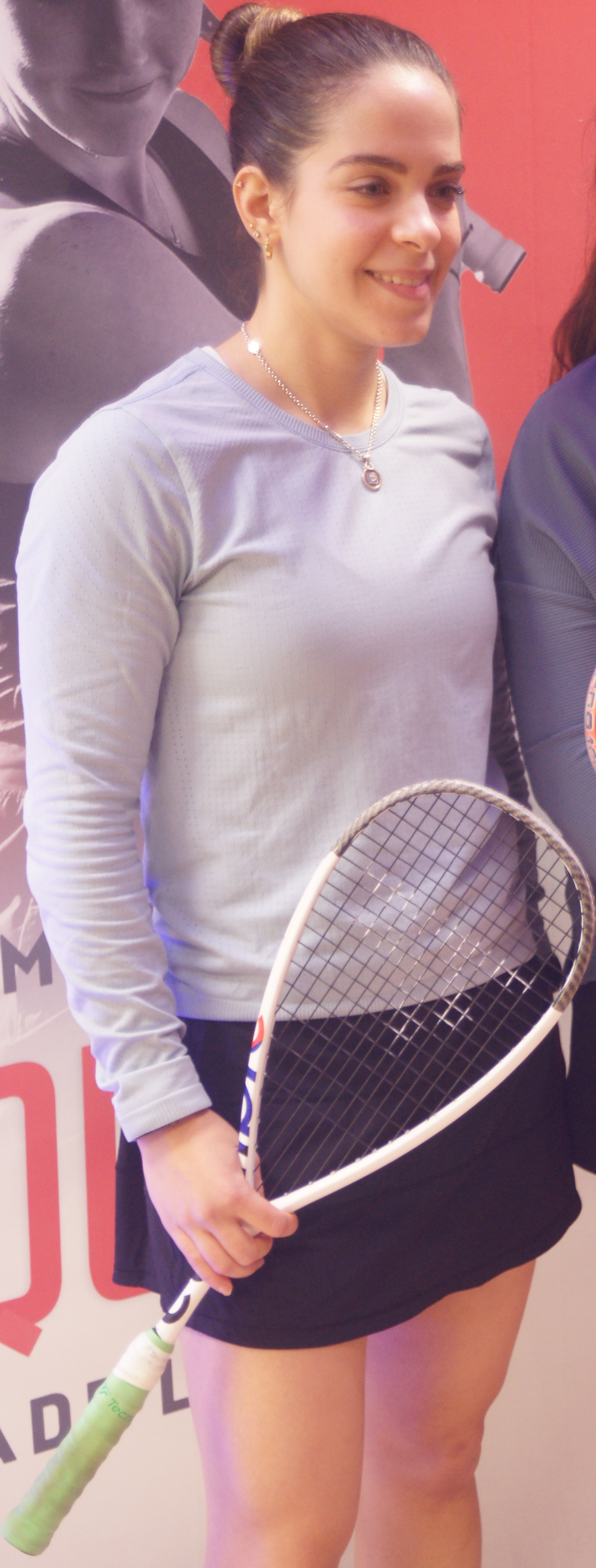
- Hana Ramadan, Monte Carlo Squash Classic 2024

Personal information
- Born: September 30, 1997 (age 28) Alexandria, Egypt

Sport
- Country: Egypt
- Handedness: Right Handed
- Turned pro: 2014
- Retired: Active
- Racquet used: Tecnifibre

Women's singles
- Highest ranking: No. 24 (October 2022)
- Current ranking: No. 32 (14 July 2025)

Hana Bassem Ramadan (born 30 September 1997) is an Egyptian professional squash player. She reached a career high ranking of number 24 in the world during October 2022.
