= Mayar Hany =

Current Egyptian squash player (born 1997)

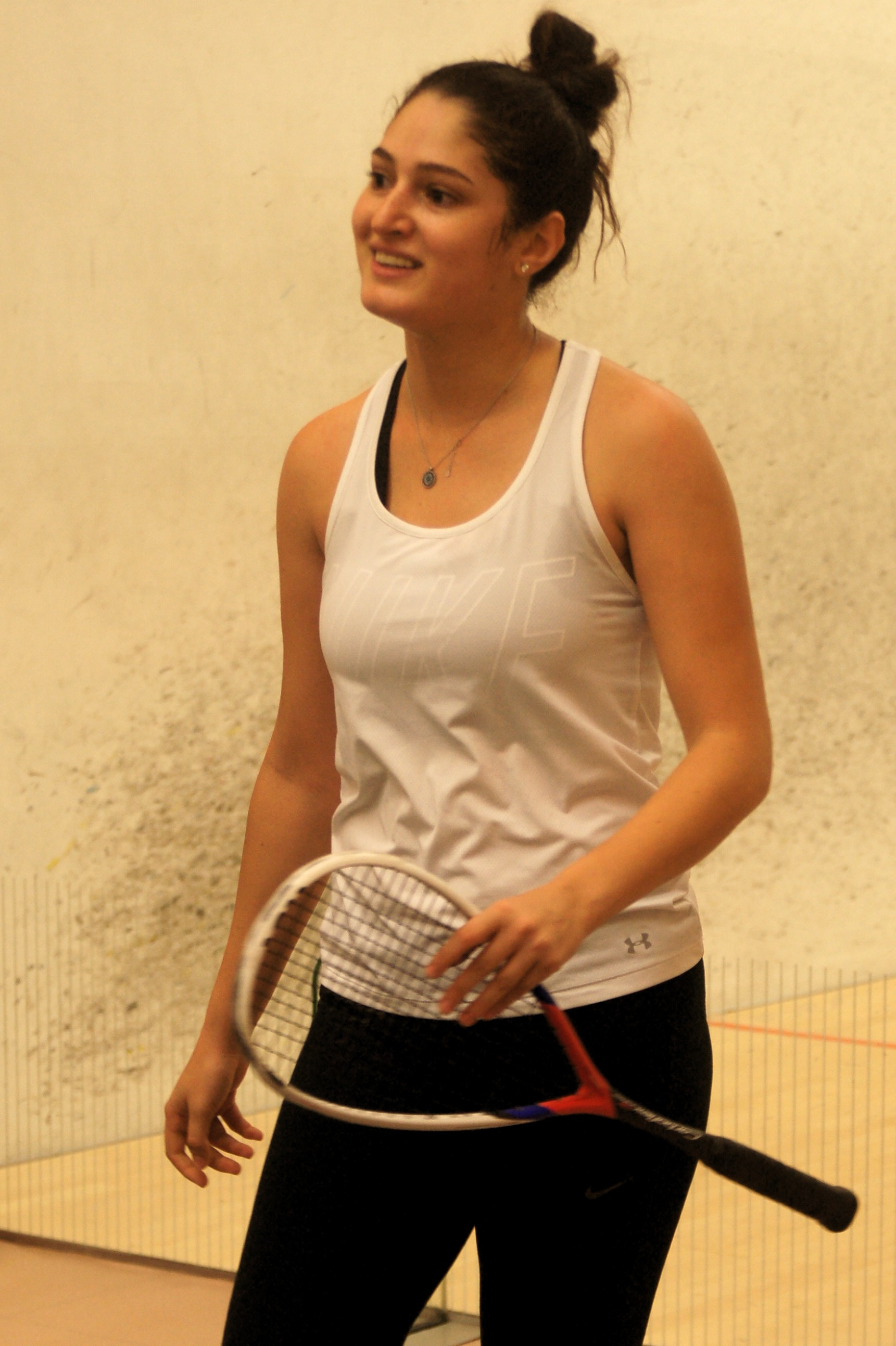

Personal information
- Born: 5 February 1997 (age 29) Cairo, Egypt

Sport
- Country: Egypt
- Turned pro: 2011
- Retired: Active
- Racquet used: Tecnifibre

Women's singles
- Highest ranking: No. 23 (May 2017)
- Current ranking: No. 34 (February 2018)
- Updated on February, 2018

Mayar Hany, also known as Mayar Hany Abdelrahman and Mayar Hany Mohamed (born 5 February 1997 in Cairo) is an Egyptian professional squash player. As of February 2018, she was ranked number 34 in the world. Her career high PSA ranking was World No. 23, in May 2017.
