= Hana Moataz =

Egyptian squash player (born 2000)

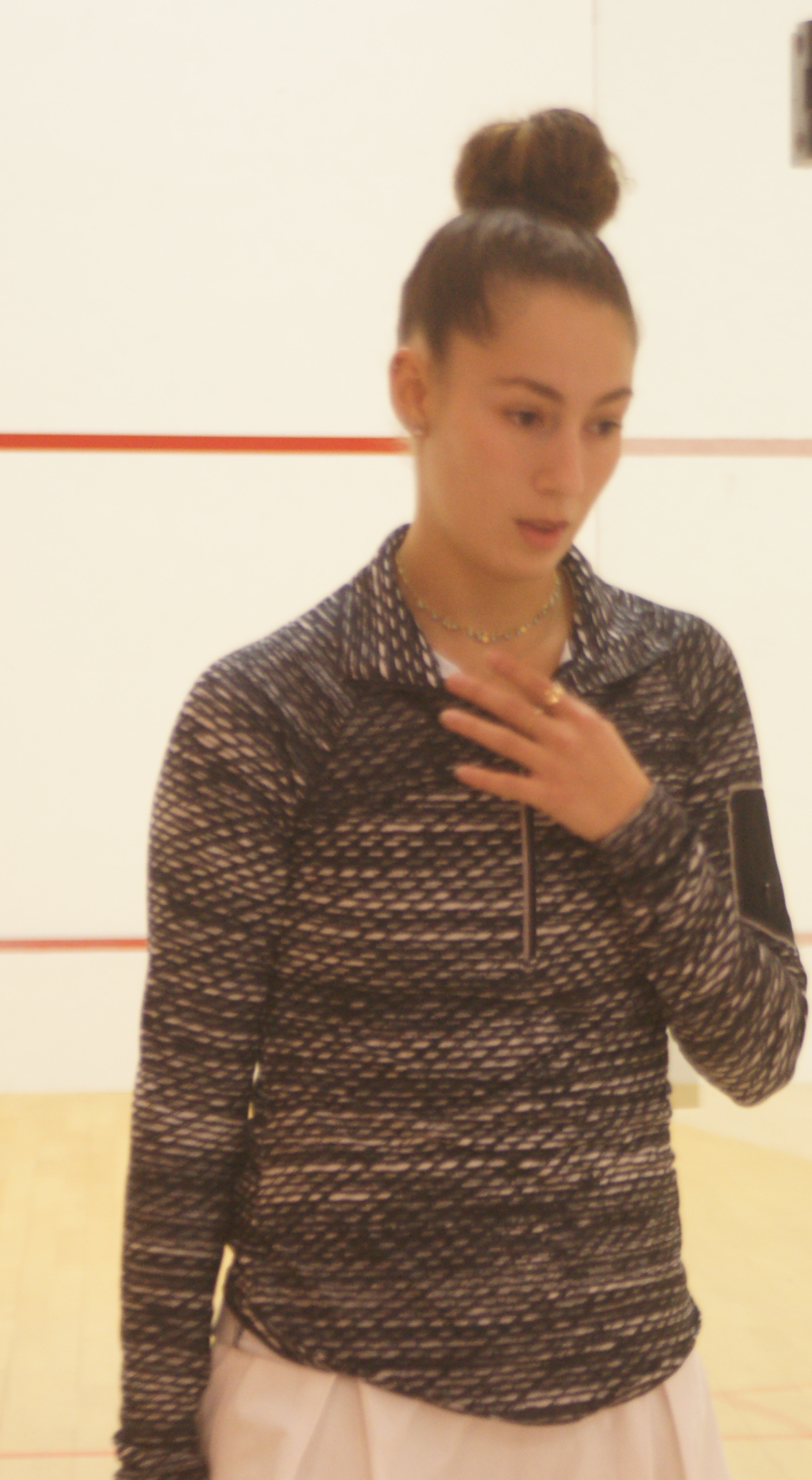

Personal information
- Born: March 21, 2000 (age 26) Giza, Egypt
- Height: 175 cm (5 ft 9 in)

Sport
- Country: Egypt
- Handedness: Right Handed
- Coached by: Omar Abdelaziz, Hossam Shadad
- Retired: Active

Women's singles
- Highest ranking: No. 27 (July 2024)
- Current ranking: No. 30 (14 July 2025)
- Updated on September 2024

Hana Moataz (Arabic: هنا معتز), also known as Hana Ayoub (born 21 March 2000 in Giza) is an Egyptian professional squash player. As of September 2024, she was ranked number 28 in the world. She competed for the Harvard Crimson, graduating in 2021.
