= Amina Yousry =

Egyptian squash player (born 2000)

Personal information
- Born: March 9, 2000 (age 26) Cairo, Egypt

Sport
- Country: Egypt
- Handedness: Right Handed
- Turned pro: 2015
- Retired: Active
- Racquet used: Prince

Women's singles
- Highest ranking: No. 39 (August 2016)
- Current ranking: No. 64 (February 2018)
- Updated on February, 2018

Amina Yousry (born 9 March 2000 in Cairo) is an Egyptian professional squash player. As of February 2018, she was ranked number 64 in the world, her career-high PSA ranking being World No. 39, in August 2016. She competed for the Harvard Crimson, graduating in 2021.
