= Mariam Ibrahim Metwally =

Egyptian squash player (born 1996)

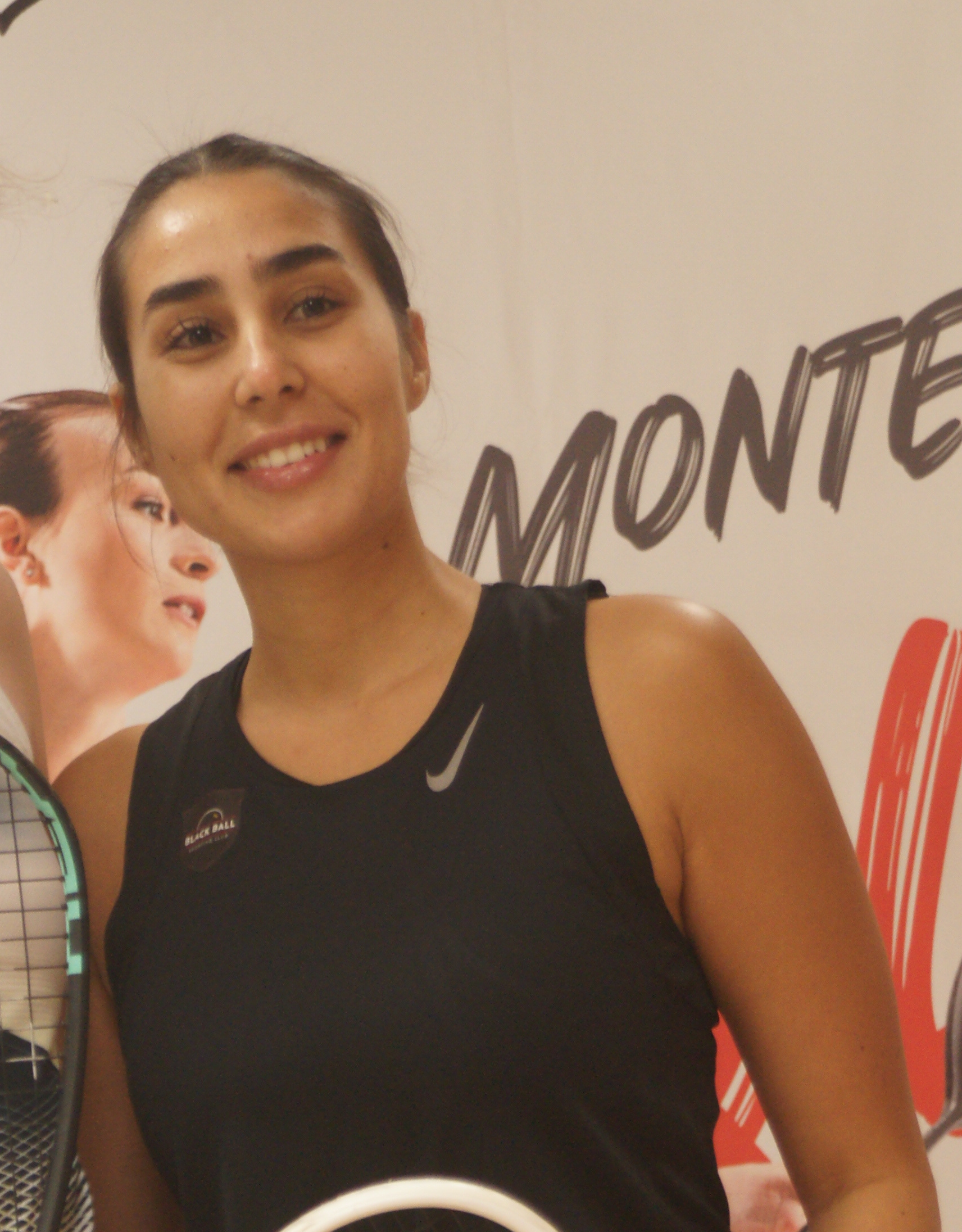
- Mariam Metwally, Monte Carlo Squash Classic 2023

Personal information
- Born: November 11, 1996 (age 29) Egypt

Sport
- Country: Egypt
- Handedness: Right Handed
- Turned pro: 2012
- Coached by: Shreen Adel
- Retired: Active
- Racquet used: Tecnifibre

Women's singles
- Highest ranking: No. 20 (April 2018)
- Current ranking: No. 35 (September 2024)
- Updated on September 2024

Mariam Ibrahim Metwally (born November 11, 1996) is an Egyptian professional squash player. She reached a career-high PSA ranking of World No. 20 in April 2018.
