= Youssef Soliman =

Egyptian squash player (born 1997)

Personal information
- Born: 10 January 1997 (age 29) Cairo, Egypt
- Height: 1.77 m (5 ft 10 in)
- Weight: 68 kg (150 lb)

Sport
- Country: Egypt
- Turned pro: 2014
- Coached by: Hadrian Stiff; Omar Abdel Aziz
- Retired: Active
- Racquet used: Prince

Men's singles
- Highest ranking: No. 8 (June 2025)
- Current ranking: No. 9 (4 August 2025)
- Title: 6
- Tour final: 8
Medal record
Men's squash
Representing Egypt
World Team Championships
Gold medal – first place	2023 Tauranga	Team

Youssef Soliman (Arabic: يُوسُف سُلَيْمَان; born 10 January 1997) is a professional squash player who represents Egypt. He is a world team champion and reached a career high world ranking of 10 in December 2024.

== Career ==
Soliman reached a world ranking of World No. 11 in October 2022. He won three titles back to back within a year of turning professional.

In May 2023, he was ranked 12 for the 2023 PSA Men's World Squash Championship, but lost to former world champion Karim Abdel Gawad in the first round. In December 2023, he was part of the Egyptian team that secured the gold medal at the 2023 Men's World Team Squash Championships in New Zealand.

As the number 12 seed at the 2024 PSA Men's World Squash Championship he reached the third round before going out to Mazen Hesham.
