= Youssef Ibrahim =

Egyptian squash player (born 1999)

Personal information
- Nicknames: Golden boy, Gunslinger
- Nationality: Egyptian
- Born: 2 March 1999 (age 27) Cairo, Egypt
- Height: 177 cm (5 ft 10 in)
- Weight: 78 kg (172 lb)

Sport
- Handedness: Left Handed
- Turned pro: 2015
- Coached by: Karim Darwish, Omar Abdel Aziz
- Retired: Active
- Racquet used: Harrow

Men's singles
- Highest ranking: No. 5 (May 2026)
- Current ranking: No. 5 (May 2026)
- Title: 9
Medal record
World Championships
Silver medal – second place	2026 Giza	singles

Youssef Ibrahim (born 2 March 1999) is an Egyptian professional squash player. He reached a career high ranking of 5 in the world during May 2026.

== Biography ==
While still playing for the Princeton University men's squash team, he beat top seed of the PSA Qatar Classic and former world number one Mohamed El Shorbagy. Ibrahim studied at Princeton University and played as the No. 1 seed for the men's squash team.

In August 2019, Ibrahim won his 9th PSA title after securing victory in the South African Open during the 2019–20 PSA World Tour.

After reaching the finals of the China Open, HKFC Squash Open and Hong Kong Open during the 2025–26 PSA Squash Tour, Ibrahim produced the best result of his career, when he reached the final of the 2026 World championships, losing to defending champion Mostafa Asal in the final.

== Titles and Finals ==
=== Major Finals (1) ===
Major tournaments include:

- PSA World Championships
- PSA World Tour Finals
- Top-tier PSA World Tour tournaments (Platinum/World Series/Super Series)

Year/Season	Tournament	Opponent	Result	Score
2022	Windy City Open	Paul Coll	Loss (1)	11-7 12-10 4-11 7-11 9–11
