= Salma Hany Ibrahim Ahmed =

Egyptian squash player (born 1996)

Personal information
- Born: August 5, 1996 (age 29) Egypt

Sport
- Country: Egypt
- Handedness: Right Handed
- Coached by: Ahmed Khalil Mahmoud Yehia
- Retired: Active
- Racquet used: Tecnifibre

Women's singles
- Highest ranking: No. 7 (January 2022)
- Current ranking: No. 15 (14 July 2025)

Salma Hany Ibrahim Ahmed (Arabic: سلمى هاني إبراهيم أحمد; born 5 August 1996) is an Egyptian professional squash player. She reached a career-high PSA ranking of World No. 7 in January 2022.

In April 2025, Hany won her 5th PSA title after securing victory in the Manchester Open during the 2024–25 PSA Squash Tour.
