= Sivasangari Subramaniam =

Malaysian squash player

Personal information
- Nationality: Malaysian
- Born: January 24, 1999 (age 27) Sungai Petani, Kedah, Malaysia
- Height: 160 cm (5 ft 3 in)
- Weight: 53 kg (8 st 5 lb)

Sport
- Coached by: Greg Gaultier
- Retired: Active
- Racquet used: Dunlop

Women's singles
- Highest ranking: No. 5 (June 2026)
- Current ranking: No. 5 (June 2026)
- Title: 16
Medal record
Women's squash
Representing Malaysia
World Team Championships
Bronze medal – third place	2024 Hong Kong	Team
World Doubles Championships
Bronze medal – third place	2022 Glasgow	Doubles
Asian Games
Gold medal – first place	2022 Hangzhou	Singles
Gold medal – first place	2022 Hangzhou	Team
Gold medal – first place	2026 Aichi-Nagoya	Singles
Gold medal – first place	2026 Aichi-Nagoya	Team
Silver medal – second place	2018 Jakarta-Palembang	Singles
Bronze medal – third place	2018 Jakarta-Palembang	Team
Asian Championships
Silver medal – second place	2023 Hong Kong	Singles
Southeast Asian Games
Gold medal – first place	2017 Kuala Lumpur	Singles
Gold medal – first place	2017 Kuala Lumpur	Mixed doubles

Sivasangari Subramaniam (born 24 January 1999) is a Malaysian professional squash player. She reached a career high ranking of number 5 in the world during April 2026.

== Career ==
In 2011, Sivasangari was nominated as MSSM (National Schools Sports Council) 2011 Promising Sportsgirl of the Year. On 8 July 2018, she became the youngest women's National Champion by defeating Low Wee Wern in the final at the Ohana 34th National Squash Championships. Sivasangari became the 2018 British Junior Open champion by defeating Satomi Watanabe.

On 6 March 2022, she won College Squash Association (CSA) National Collegiate Individual Championships to clinch her first individual title for Cornell University.

On 1 April 2024, she won the Gillen Markets London Classic Gold event, completing a dream week at the by beating World No. 2 Hania El Hammamy to lift the PSA World Tour Gold-level title.

In December 2024, Sivasangari helped Malaysia win the bronze medal at the 2024 Women's World Team Squash Championships.

In March 2026, she won her 16th PSA title after securing victory in the Australian during the 2025–26 PSA Squash Tour.

In Asian Games 2026, She have made history by becoming the first Malaysian squash players along with Ng Eain Yow to qualify for the 2028 Olympics after winning gold medals at the Asian Games in Aichi-Nagoya, Japan.The defending champions won the men's and women's singles finals and earned a ticket to the 2028 Summer Olympics, where squash will make its Olympic debut.

== Personal life ==
Sivasangari was born in Sungai Petani, Kedah to Tamil parents, Valli Nagappan and Subramaniam Kaniappan. She started playing squash at the age of eight. She is a former student of SMK Sultanah Asma and obtained her GCE Ordinary Level from Kolej Tuanku Ja'afar. She is currently studying Bachelor of Science (Mass Communications/ Media Studies) at Cornell University.

On 26 June 2022, she was involved in a car accident along the Maju Expressway. She sustained fractures on her face and C1 vertebra. Due to the injuries, she had to pull out of the 2022 Commonwealth Games.

== See also ==
- Official Women's Squash World Ranking
