= 2013 Men's World Junior Squash Championships =

Men's World Junior 2013
- 20th WSF Men's World Junior Championship
- Location: Wrocław Poland
- Venue: Hasta La Vista Club
- Website hastalavista.pl/wjc-2013/strona-glowna-2?lang=en

Results
- Champion: (Egypt) Karim El Hammamy
- Runner-up: (Egypt) Fares Dessouky
- Third place: (England) Richie Fallows

The 2013 Men's World Junior Squash Championships is the men's edition of the 2013 World Junior Squash Championships, which serves as the individual world Junior championship for squash players. The event took place at the Hasta La Vista Club in Wrocław in Poland from 16 to 21 July 2013. Karim El Hammamy won his first World Junior Open title, defeating Fares Dessouky in the final.

== Seeds ==
1. [1*] (Egypt) Fares Dessouky (final)
2. [2*] (Egypt) Karim El Hammamy (champion)
3. [3/4*] (Pakistan) Syed Ali Mujtaba Shah Bokhari (round of 16)
4. [3/4*] (Jordan) Ahmad Al-Saraj (round of 16)
5. [5/8*] (Kuwait) Yousif Nizar Saleh (quarterfinals)
6. [5/8*] (Peru) Diego Elías (quarterfinals)
7. [5/8*] (England) Richie Fallows (semifinals)
8. [5/8*] (Qatar) Abdulla Al-Tamimi (semifinals)
9. [9/12*] (India) Kush Kumar (third round)
10. [9/12*] (Egypt) Osama Khalifa (round of 16)
11. [9/12*] (Switzerland) Robin Gadola (third round)
12. [9/12*] (England) Bradley Smith (round of 16)
13. [13/16*] (Pakistan) Tayyab Aslam (round of 16)
14. [13/16*] (Israel) Daniel Poleshchuk (third round)
15. [13/16*] (Pakistan) Amaad Fareed (second round)
16. [13/16*] (Egypt) Mohamed El Gawarhy (quarterfinals)

== Draw and results ==
=== Finals ===
Quarter finals
1	(Egypt) Fares Dessouky	11	9	11	11
5/8	(Peru) Diego Elías	9	11	5	4
5/8	(Qatar) Abdulla Al-Tamimi	12	11	11
(England) Lyell Fuller	10	8	6
13/16	(Egypt) Mohd El Gawarhy	11	4	13	8	9
5/8	(England) Richie Fallows	7	11	11	11	11
5/8	(Kuwait) Yousif Nizar Saleh	11	5	8	7
2	(Egypt) Karim El Hammamy	9	11	11	11

Semi finals
1	(Egypt) Fares Dessouky	11	12	11
5/8	(Qatar) Abdulla Al-Tamimi	4	10	7
5/8	(England) Richie Fallows	5	11	7	5
2	(Egypt) Karim El Hammamy	11	9	11	11

Final
1	(Egypt) Fares Dessouky	8	6	11	11
2	(Egypt) Karim El Hammamy	11	11	6	13

=== Top half ===
==== Section 1 ====
First round
1	(Egypt) Fares Dessouky
(Poland) Piotr Hemmerling	7	9	11	2
(Czech Republic) Vojtech Babista	11	11	8	11
(Israel) Roee Avraham
17/32	(Switzerland) Remo Handl
17/32	(Portugal) Claudio Pinto
(Poland) Filip Mazurkiewicz	4	3	2
(France) Enzo Corigliano	11	11	11
(Ukraine) Vitaliy Yevdochenko	5	3	2
(Spain) Pascal Gomez	11	11	11
13/16	(Pakistan) Tayyab Aslam
9/12	(Switzerland) Robin Gadola
(Poland) Adam Petczynski	7	4	5
(Argentina) Gonzalo Gallardo	11	11	11
(Germany) Andre Ergenz
17/32	(England) Angus Gillams
17/32	(India) Deepak Mishra
(Kuwait) Eissa Eshkanani
(Namibia) Le Hugo Van Rooyen	4	3	7
(United States) Pierson Broadwater	11	11	11
5/8	(Peru) Diego Elías

Second round
1	(Egypt) Fares Dessouky	11	11	11
(Czech Republic) Vojtech Babista	2	3	2
(Israel) Roee Avraham	11	8	5	12	8
17/32	(Switzerland) Remo Handl	9	11	11	10	11
17/32	(Portugal) Claudio Pinto	11	11	14	8	11
(France) Enzo Corigliano	7	1	16	11	7
(Spain) Pascal Gomez	13	8	3	3
13/16	(Pakistan) Tayyab Aslam	11	11	11	11
9/12	(Switzerland) Robin Gadola	11	11	11
(Argentina) Gonzalo Gallardo	5	9	7
(Germany) Andre Ergenz	11	6	11	4	9
17/32	(England) Angus Gillams	8	11	8	11	11
17/32	(India) Deepak Mishra
(Kuwait) Eissa Eshkanani	wo
(United States) Pierson Broadwater	5	11	4	9
5/8	(Peru) Diego Elías	11	9	11	11

Third round
1	(Egypt) Fares Dessouky	11	11	11
17/32	(Switzerland) Remo Handl	2	4	2
17/32	(Portugal) Claudio Pinto	6	6	9
13/16	(Pakistan) Tayyab Aslam	11	11	11
9/12	(Switzerland) Robin Gadola	11	11	3	13	5
17/32	(England) Angus Gillams	4	13	11	11	11
17/32	(India) Deepak Mishra	3	1	12	4
5/8	(Peru) Diego Elías	11	11	10	11

Round of 16
1	(Egypt) Fares Dessouky	11	11	11
13/16	(Pakistan) Tayyab Aslam	6	8	8
Quarter finals
1	(Egypt) Fares Dessouky	11	9	11	11
5/8	(Peru) Diego Elías	9	11	5	4
17/32	(England) Angus Gillams	6	6	8
5/8	(Peru) Diego Elías	11	11	11

==== Section 2 ====
First round
5/8	(Qatar) Abdulla Al-Tamimi
(Argentina) Francisco Obregon	12	7	11	11
(France) Adrien Grondin	10	11	5	7
(Pakistan) Israr Ahmed
17/32	(Switzerland) Manuel Wanner
17/32	(Guatemala) Josué Enríquez
(Kuwait) Khaled Al-Jenaidel
(South Africa) Lawrence Kuhn	4	8	9
(Hungary) Lenard Puski	11	11	11
9/12	(Egypt) Os. Khaled Khalifa
13/16	(Pakistan) Amaad Fareed
(India) Rishi Tandon	11	9	11	11
(Czech Republic) Petr Zatrepalek	7	11	6	3
(England) Lyell Fuller
17/32	(United States) Dylan Murray
17/32	(Germany) Lucas Wirths
(Colombia) Nicolás Valderrama
(Mexico) Edgar Zayas	11	11	11
(France) Mathias Grondin	6	2	2
3/4	(Jordan) Ahmad Al-Saraj

Second round
5/8	(Qatar) Abdulla Al-Tamimi	11	11	11
(Argentina) Francisco Obregon	6	7	6
(Pakistan) Israr Ahmed
17/32	(Switzerland) Manuel Wanner	wo
17/32	(Guatemala) Josué Enríquez	11	13	11	11
(Kuwait) Khaled Al-Jenaidel	8	15	5	7
(Hungary) Lenard Puski	4	6	7
9/12	(Egypt) Os. Khaled Khalifa	11	11	11
13/16	(Pakistan) Amaad Fareed	wo
(India) Rishi Tandon
(England) Lyell Fuller	11	9	6	11	11
17/32	(United States) Dylan Murray	6	11	11	4	6
17/32	(Germany) Lucas Wirths	8	6	10
(Colombia) Nicolás Valderrama	11	11	12
(Mexico) Edgar Zayas	9	9	10
3/4	(Jordan) Ahmad Al-Saraj	11	11	12

Third round
5/8	(Qatar) Abdulla Al-Tamimi
(Pakistan) Israr Ahmed	wo
17/32	(Guatemala) Josué Enríquez	2	9	11	6
9/12	(Egypt) Os. Khaled Khalifa	11	11	7	11
(India) Rishi Tandon	4	5	14	7
(England) Lyell Fuller	11	11	12	11
(Colombia) Nicolás Valderrama	8	7	7
3/4	(Jordan) Ahmad Al-Saraj	11	11	11

Round of 16
5/8	(Qatar) Abdulla Al-Tamimi	11	11	11
9/12	(Egypt) Os. Khaled Khalifa	6	6	1
Quarter finals
5/8	(Qatar) Abdulla Al-Tamimi	11	11	11
(England) Lyell Fuller	10	8	6
(England) Lyell Fuller	11	7	7	11	11
3/4	(Jordan) Ahmad Al-Saraj	9	11	11	8	7

=== Bottom half ===
==== Section 1 ====
First round
3/4	(Pakistan) Syed Shah Bokhari
(Poland) Adrian Marszal	4	5	7
(Germany) Niklas Becher	11	11	11
(Czech Republic) Jakub Solnicky
17/32	(Colombia) Andres de Frutos
17/32	(France) Baptiste Masotti
(Sweden) Michael Babra
(Belgium) Jordy Camps	8	5	8
(United States) Hayes Murphy	11	11	11
13/16	(Egypt) Mohd El Gawarhy
9/12	(India) Kush Kumar
(Argentina) Rodrigo Obregon	11	11	4	11
(Hungary) Balazs Farkas	2	5	11	9
(Kuwait) Athbi Khalid Hamad
17/32	(Wales) Joel Makin
17/32	(United States) Edward Columbia
(Japan) Seigo Masuda
(Qatar) Syed Azlan Amjad	11	13	11
(Switzerland) Dimitri Steinmann	4	11	6
5/8	(England) Richie Fallows

Second round
3/4	(Pakistan) Syed Shah Bokhari	11	11	11
(Germany) Niklas Becher	7	4	6
(Czech Republic) Jakub Solnicky	8	9	6
17/32	(Colombia) Andres de Frutos	11	11	11
17/32	(France) Baptiste Masotti	11	11	11
(Sweden) Michael Babra	5	2	4
(United States) Hayes Murphy	7	10	9
13/16	(Egypt) Mohd El Gawarhy	11	12	11
9/12	(India) Kush Kumar	11	11	11
(Argentina) Rodrigo Obregon	5	8	7
(Kuwait) Athbi Khalid Hamad	1	4	4
17/32	(Wales) Joel Makin	11	11	11
17/32	(United States) Edward Columbia	11	11	11
(Japan) Seigo Masuda	6	7	9
(Qatar) Syed Azlan Amjad	6	4	6
5/8	(England) Richie Fallows	11	11	11

Third round
3/4	(Pakistan) Syed Shah Bokhari	11	11	11
17/32	(Colombia) Andres de Frutos	3	5	8
17/32	(France) Baptiste Masotti	9	16	5	12
13/16	(Egypt) Mohd El Gawarhy	11	14	11	14
9/12	(India) Kush Kumar	9	11	11	7
17/32	(Wales) Joel Makin	11	13	6	11
17/32	(United States) Edward Columbia	8	6	14	6
5/8	(England) Richie Fallows	11	11	12	11

Round of 16
3/4	(Pakistan) Syed Shah Bokhari	11	8	9	11	5
13/16	(Egypt) Mohd El Gawarhy	8	11	11	7	11
Quarter finals
13/16	(Egypt) Mohd El Gawarhy	11	4	13	8	9
5/8	(England) Richie Fallows	7	11	11	11	11
17/32	(Wales) Joel Makin	7	12	9	7
5/8	(England) Richie Fallows	11	10	11	11

==== Section 2 ====
First round
5/8	(Kuwait) Yousif Nizar Saleh
(South Africa) Aubrey Lawrence
(India) Vijay Meena Kumar	wo
(United States) Devin McLaughlin
17/32	(France) Auguste Dussourd
17/32	(Pakistan) Bilal Zakir
(Colombia) Andres González
(Germany) Felix Auer	11	11	11
(Poland) Damian Olejnik	3	2	5
9/12	(England) Bradley Smith
13/16	(Israel) Daniel Poleshchuk
(Hungary) Gerg. Nandor Papp	8	11	8	15	11
(India) Madhav Dhingra	11	8	11	13	7
(England) George Parker	11	11	11
(Czech Republic) Martin Svec	5	5	8
17/32	(Egypt) Omar El Atmas
17/32	(Argentina) Federico Cioffi
(Netherlands) Roshan Bharos
(Switzerland) Silvio Soom	11	11	11
(Ukraine) Dmytro Pogrebniak	0	7	8
2	(Egypt) Karim El Hammamy

Second round
5/8	(Kuwait) Yousif Nizar Saleh	11	11	11
(South Africa) Aubrey Lawrence	7	6	1
(United States) Devin McLaughlin	11	11	5	4	11
17/32	(France) Auguste Dussourd	8	7	11	11	7
17/32	(Pakistan) Bilal Zakir	wo
(Colombia) Andres González
(Germany) Felix Auer	5	9	6
9/12	(England) Bradley Smith	11	11	11
13/16	(Israel) Daniel Poleshchuk	11	12	11
(Hungary) Gergely Nandor Papp	4	10	6
(England) George Parker	8	12	3
17/32	(Egypt) Omar El Atmas	11	14	11
17/32	(Argentina) Federico Cioffi	11	11	11
(Netherlands) Roshan Bharos	4	9	9
(Switzerland) Silvio Soom	7	10	3
2	(Egypt) Karim El Hammamy	11	12	11

Third round
5/8	(Kuwait) Yousif Nizar Saleh	9	11	11	11
(United States) Devin McLaughlin	11	3	7	4
(Colombia) Andres González	7	11	7	9
9/12	(England) Bradley Smith	11	7	11	11
13/16	(Israel) Daniel Poleshchuk	7	12	8	3
17/32	(Egypt) Omar El Atmas	11	10	11	11
17/32	(Argentina) Federico Cioffi	6	7	4
2	(Egypt) Karim El Hammamy	11	11	11

Round of 16
5/8	(Kuwait) Yousif Nizar Saleh	13	11	11
9/12	(England) Bradley Smith	11	3	6
Quarter finals
5/8	(Kuwait) Yousif Nizar Saleh	11	5	8	7
2	(Egypt) Karim El Hammamy	9	11	11	11
17/32	(Egypt) Omar El Atmas	8	8	7
2	(Egypt) Karim El Hammamy	11	11	11

== See also ==
- 2013 Women's World Junior Squash Championships
- British Junior Open Squash
- World Junior Squash Championships

Preceded by Qatar (Doha); 2012	Squash World Junior; Poland (Wrocław); 2014	Succeeded by Namibia (Windhoek); 2014
