= 2014 Men's World Junior Squash Championships =

Men's World Junior 2014
- 21st WSF Men's World Junior Championship
- Location: Windhoek Namibia
- Website www.wsfworldjuniors.com

Results
- Champion: (Peru) Diego Elías
- Runner-up: (Egypt) Omar El Atmas
- Semi-finalists: (Pakistan) S A Bokhari / (India) K Kumar

The 2014 Men's World Junior Squash Championships is the men's edition of the 2014 World Junior Squash Championships, which serves as the individual world Junior championship for squash players. The event took place in Windhoek in Namibia from 10 to 15 August 2014. Diego Elías won his first World Junior Open title, defeating Omar El Atmas in the final.

== Seeds ==
1. [1*] (Peru) Diego Elías (champion)
2. [2*] (Egypt) Karim El Hammamy (third round)
3. [3/4*] (India) Kush Kumar (semifinals)
4. [3/4*] (Pakistan) Tayyab Aslam (quarterfinals)
5. [5/8*] (England) Lyell Fuller (third round)
6. [5/8*] (England) George Parker (quarterfinals)
7. [5/8*] (Israel) Daniel Poleshchuk (second round)
8. [5/8*] (Egypt) Mohamed El Gawarhy (quarterfinals)
9. [9/12*] (Egypt) Omar El Atmas (final)
10. [9/12*] (Republic of Ireland) David Ryan (third round)
11. [9/12*] (Pakistan) Syed Ali Bokhari (semifinals)
12. [9/12*] (Pakistan) Israr Ahmed (round of 16)
13. [13/16*] (Malaysia) Mohammad Syafiq Kamal (round of 16)
14. [13/16*] (Republic of Ireland) Michael Craig (third round)
15. [13/16*] (France) Auguste Dussourd (round of 16)
16. [13/16*] (Egypt) Youssef Soliman (quarterfinals)

== Draw and results ==
=== Finals ===
Quarter finals
1	(Peru) Diego Elías	11	11	11
5/8	(Egypt) Mohamed El Gawarhy	6	4	6
5/8	(England) George Parker	6	8	8
3/4	(India) Kush Kumar	11	11	11
3/4	(Pakistan) Tayyab Aslam	11	14	7	5	9
9/12	(Egypt) Omar El Atmas	7	12	11	11	11
9/12	(Pakistan) Syed Ali Bokhari	11	9	6	11	11
13/16	(Egypt) Youssef Soliman	7	11	11	9	7

Semi finals
1	(Peru) Diego Elías	11	11	11
3/4	(India) Kush Kumar	5	7	4
9/12	(Egypt) Omar El Atmas	13	10	11	12
9/12	(Pakistan) Syed Ali Bokhari	11	12	9	10

Final
1	(Peru) Diego Elías	11	11	11
9/12	(Egypt) Omar El Atmas	3	2	1

=== Top half ===
==== Section 1 ====
First round
1	(Peru) Diego Elías
(Namibia) Gerhardus Lottering	2	3	5
(England) James Evans	11	11	11
(India) Vij. Kumar Meena	11	11	11
(Guatemala) Ricardo Toscano	8	4	5
(Kuwait) Ali Alqallaf	2	2	0
(Colombia) Andrés Herrera	11	11	11
(Hong Kong) Tsz Kwan Lau	w/o
(Republic of Ireland) Cillian Dunne
(Botswana) Elliot Msind. Sibanda	2	4	5
(Argentina) Juan Seg. Barreyro	11	11	11
(United States) Max D Reed	11	11	11
(South Africa) Justin Wesson	9	6	7
(Israel) Nir Cohen	8	9	7
13/16	(Malaysia) Mohd Syafiq Kamal	11	11	11
9/12	(Pakistan) Israr Ahmed
(Germany) Yannik Omlor	6	7	9
(France) Enzo Corigliano	11	11	11
(Finland) Miko Äijänen	6	11	11	11
(Canada) Michael Mehl	11	9	8	7
(South Africa) Aubrey Lawrence	7	8	11	11	8
(Colombia) Dairo Sandoval	11	11	7	4	11
(Pakistan) Asim Khan	11	11	11
(England) James Peach	7	7	9
(New Zealand) Chapman Kutia	4	4	9
(Spain) Bernat Jaume	11	11	11
(Sweden) Alexander Lundqvist	8	11	7	8
(Zimbabwe) Run. Kadyautumbe	11	5	11	11
5/8	(Egypt) Mohd El Gawarhy

Second round
1	(Peru) Diego Elías	11	11	11
(England) James Evans	3	6	4
(India) Vij. Kumar Meena	1	11	7	11	8
(Colombia) Andrés Herrera	11	9	11	3	11
(Republic of Ireland) Cillian Dunne	11	7	7	11	7
(Argentina) Juan Seg. Barreyro	6	11	11	7	11
(United States) Max D Reed	11	9	2	5
13/16	(Malaysia) Mohd Syaf. Kamal	7	11	11	11
9/12	(Pakistan) Israr Ahmed	11	11	13
(France) Enzo Corigliano	5	5	11
(Finland) Miko Äijänen	6	5	11	11
(Colombia) Dairo Sandoval	11	11	4	13
(Pakistan) Asim Khan	11	11	5	8	12
(Spain) Bernat Jaume	9	4	11	11	10
(Zimbabwe) Runy. Kadyautumbe	1	2	2
5/8	(Egypt) Mohd El Gawarhy	11	11	11

Third round
1	(Peru) Diego Elías	11	11	11
(India) Vijay Kumar Meena	5	2	2
(Argentina) Juan Seg. Barreyro	3	4	5
13/16	(Malaysia) Mohd Syaf. Kamal	11	11	11
9/12	(Pakistan) Israr Ahmed	11	11	11
(Colombia) Dairo Sandoval	7	4	4
(Pakistan) Asim Khan	9	11	7	8
5/8	(Egypt) Mohd El Gawarhy	11	7	11	11

Round of 16
1	(Peru) Diego Elías	11	11	11
13/16	(Malaysia) Mohd Syafiq Kamal	4	4	8
Quarter finals
1	(Peru) Diego Elías	11	11	11
5/8	(Egypt) Mohd El Gawarhy	6	4	6
9/12	(Pakistan) Israr Ahmed	5	8	4
5/8	(Egypt) Mohd El Gawarhy	11	11	11

==== Section 2 ====
First round
5/8	(England) George Parker
(Hong Kong) Cheuk Hin Chris Lo	w/o
(Argentina) Iván Caucich
(Kuwait) Khaled Aljenaidel	11	13	11
(Zimbabwe) Tafadzwa Mushunje	7	11	8
(Namibia) Dylan M. Spencer
(Jordan) Mohammad Al Sarraj	w/o
(Egypt) Saadeld. Abouaish	12	9	6	8
(South Africa) Jean-P. VD Merwe	10	11	11	11
(Malaysia) Ampandi Muhd Aqif	w/o
(Guatemala) Qaini Bonilla
(Canada) David Baillargeon	11	11	4	11
(United States) Thomas Kingshott	5	8	5
9/12	(Republic of Ireland) David Ryan
13/16	(Republic of Ireland) Michael Craig
(France) Benjamin Aubert	6	10	11	7
(United States) Derek Hsue	11	12	2	11
(Nigeria) Abubakar Adamu	w/o
(New Zealand) Scott Galloway
(Sweden) Pontus Rengbo	9	9	4
(Malaysia) Darren Ch. Ti Luun	11	11	11
(Spain) Edmon Lop. Moller	11	11	11
(Namibia) Le-Hugo Van Rooyen	4	6	1
(Israel) Roee Avraham	10	11	11	11
(Germany) Niklas Becher	12	7	7	8
(Botswana) Tebogo Thabologo	4	5	11
(Zimbabwe) Luke Mi. Mannion	11	11	13
3/4	(India) Kush Kumar

Second round
5/8	(England) George Parker	11	11	11
(Argentina) Iván Caucich	2	2	7
(Kuwait) Khaled Aljenaidel	11	11	11
(Namibia) Dylan Marc Spencer	3	3	1
(Egypt) Saadeld. Abouaish	11	11	11
(Guatemala) Qaini Bonilla	2	4	2
(Canada) David Baillargeon	8	11	12	11	3
9/12	(Republic of Ireland) David Ryan	11	8	14	6	11
13/16	(Republic of Ireland) Michael Craig	11	11	6	6	11
(United States) Derek Hsue	3	8	11	11	5
(New Zealand) Scott Galloway	7	6	8
(Malaysia) Darren Ch. Ti Luun	11	11	11
(Spain) Edmon Lop. Moller	11	10	11	7	11
(Israel) Roee Avraham	7	12	9	11	7
(Zimbabwe) Luke Mich. Mannion	0	7	4
3/4	(India) Kush Kumar	11	11	11

Third round
5/8	(England) George Parker	11	11	11
(Kuwait) Khaled Aljenaidel	5	4	6
(Egypt) Saadeld. Abouaish	5	11	11	11
9/12	(Republic of Ireland) David Ryan	11	4	6	2
13/16	(Republic of Ireland) Michael Craig	11	11	4	5	9
(Malaysia) Darren Ch. Ti Luun	6	7	11	11	11
(Spain) Edmon Lopez Moller	6	4	8
3/4	(India) Kush Kumar	11	11	11

Round of 16
5/8	(England) George Parker	11	11	11
(Egypt) Saadeldin Abouaish	5	1	6
Quarter finals
5/8	(England) George Parker	6	8	8
3/4	(India) Kush Kumar	11	11	11
(Malaysia) Darren Chan Ti Luun	3	4	7
3/4	(India) Kush Kumar	11	11	11

=== Bottom half ===
==== Section 1 ====
First round
3/4	(Pakistan) Tayyab Aslam
(Germany) Sean Redmen	5	1	4
(Canada) Jarryd Osborne	11	11	11
(India) Vel. Senthilkumar	11	11	11
(United States) Mason Ripka	3	3	6
(Republic of Ireland) Nikita Gilevskiy	7	7	6
(England) Patrick Rooney	11	11	11
(Malaysia) Eain Yow Ng	11	11	11
(Israel) Noam Peer	3	3	5
(Namibia) Carel Olivier	0	4	5
(Colombia) Santiago Orozco	11	11	11
(Spain) Martí Munar	9	8	rtd
(Kuwait) Mohd Abd. Al-Terki	11	11
13/16	(France) Auguste Dussourd
9/12	(Egypt) Omar El Atmas
(United States) Timothy Brownell	11	11	11
(Botswana) Micky Joseph	0	1	8
(Zimbabwe) Innocent Mukumba	2	1	5
(Colombia) Santiago Camargo	11	11	11
(Namibia) George Died. Bekker	1	1	1
(Argentina) Federico Cioffi	11	11	11
(Finland) Kristian Rautiainen	11	11	11
(Qatar) Syed Azlan Iqbal	5	3	6
(South Africa) Wayne Ch. Sithole	10	11	11	11
(New Zealand) Max Trimble	12	4	5	0
(Malaysia) Sai Hung Ong	11	11	11
(Sweden) Tor Christofersen	11	6	9
5/8	(England) Lyell Fuller

Second round
3/4	(Pakistan) Tayyab Aslam	11	11	11
(Canada) Jarryd Osborne	2	7	9
(India) Velav. Senthilkumar	4	4	11	7
(England) Patrick Rooney	11	11	7	11
(Malaysia) Eain Yow Ng	11	11	11
(Colombia) Santiago Orozco	6	6	4
(Kuwait) Mohd Abd. Al-Terki	2	11	7
13/16	(France) Auguste Dussourd	11	13	11
9/12	(Egypt) Omar El Atmas	9	11	10	11	11
(United States) Timothy Brownell	11	6	12	2	3
(Colombia) Santiago Camargo	4	7	5
(Argentina) Federico Cioffi	11	11	11
(Finland) Krist. Rautiainen	11	11	11
(South Africa) Wayne Che. Sithole	7	6	8
(Malaysia) Sai Hung Ong	3	5	4
5/8	(England) Lyell Fuller	11	11	11

Third round
3/4	(Pakistan) Tayyab Aslam	11	12	10	11
(England) Patrick Rooney	6	10	12	8
(Malaysia) Eain Yow Ng	12	11	9	9	7
13/16	(France) Auguste Dussourd	10	9	11	11	11
9/12	(Egypt) Omar El Atmas	9	11	11	11
(Argentina) Federico Cioffi	11	6	5	4
(Finland) Krist. Rautiainen	11	11	11
5/8	(England) Lyell Fuller	8	9	7

Round of 16
3/4	(Pakistan) Tayyab Aslam	11	11	11
13/16	(France) Auguste Dussourd	6	7	3
Quarter finals
3/4	(Pakistan) Tayyab Aslam	11	14	7	5	9
9/12	(Egypt) Omar El Atmas	7	12	11	11	11
9/12	(Egypt) Omar El Atmas	11	11	11
(Finland) Kristian Rautiainen	4	3	3

==== Section 2 ====
First round
5/8	(Israel) Dani. Poleshchuk
(Republic of Ireland) Oisin Logan	7	8	17	17
(South Africa) Laurence Kuhn	11	11	15	19
(United States) David Yacobucci
(India) Arj. Deepak Kochar	w/o
(New Zealand) Luke Jones	9	3	7
(Spain) Iker Pajares	11	11	11
(Hong Kong) Tsun Hei Yuen	w/o
(Germany) Lucas Wirths
(Canada) Micha. Thompson	11	11	11
(Kuwait) Mohammad Ali	3	3	3
(Finland) Jami Äijänen	11	11	11
(Guatemala) Alejandro Enríquez	5	6	6
9/12	(Pakistan) Syed Ali Bokhari
13/16	(Egypt) Youssef Soliman	11	11	8	11
(Canada) Carter Robitaille	2	3	11	3
(Colombia) Nicolás Valderrama	11	11	11
(Namibia) Kyle Ch. Robe Kriel	5	2	6
(Malaysia) Mohd Mukhtar	w/o
(Zimbabwe) Callum Lawton
(Sweden) Nils Lindgren	1	3	4
(India) Madhav Dhingra	11	11	11
(Egypt) Y. Aboul-Makarim	11	11	11
(Botswana) Theo Pelonomi	1	2	2
(Nigeria) Abdulraha. Yusuf
(Hong Kong) To Yu Ling	w/o
(Argentina) Franco Romiglio	11	11	11
(Zimbabwe) Bryn Turk	1	2	6
2	(Egypt) Kar. El Hammamy

Second round
5/8	(Israel) Daniel Poleshchuk	11	8	6	8
(South Africa) Laurence Kuhn	6	11	11	11
(United States) David Yacobucci	6	12	5	3
(Spain) Iker Pajares	11	10	11	11
(Germany) Lucas Wirths	13	7	11	11
(Canada) Michael Thompson	11	11	5	9
(Finland) Jami Äijänen	11	4	4	3
9/12	(Pakistan) Syed Ali Bokhari	5	11	11	11
13/16	(Egypt) Youssef Soliman	11	11	11
(Colombia) Nicolás Valderrama	3	3	3
(Zimbabwe) Callum Lawton	7	6	2
(India) Madhav Dhingra	11	11	11
(Egypt) Y. Aboul-Makarim
(Nigeria) Abdulraham. Yusuf	w/o
(Argentina) Franco A. Romiglio	3	6	5
2	(Egypt) Kar. El Hammamy	11	11	11

Third round
(South Africa) Laurence Kuhn	11	11	8	10	11
(Spain) Iker Pajares	9	7	11	12	5
(Germany) Lucas Wirths	7	1	7
9/12	(Pakistan) Syed Ali Bokhari	11	11	11
13/16	(Egypt) Youssef Soliman	11	11	11
(India) Madhav Dhingra	1	4	2
(Egypt) Y. Aboul-Makarim	10	5	11	11	11
2	(Egypt) Kar. El Hammamy	12	11	9	5	7

Round of 16
(South Africa) Laurence Kuhn	4	6	9
9/12	(Pakistan) Syed Ali Bokhari	11	11	11
Quarter finals
9/12	(Pakistan) Syed Ali Bokhari	11	9	6	11	11
13/16	(Egypt) Youssef Soliman	7	11	11	9	7
13/16	(Egypt) Youssef Soliman	8	11	11	11
(Egypt) Y. Aboul-Makarim	11	4	5	5

== See also ==
- 2014 Men's World Junior Team Squash Championships
- 2014 Women's World Junior Squash Championships
- British Junior Open Squash
- World Junior Squash Championships

Preceded by Poland (Wroclaw); 2013	Squash World Junior; Namibia (Windhoek); 2014	Succeeded by Netherlands (Eindhoven); 2015
