= 2012 Men's World Junior Squash Championships =

Men's World Junior 2012
- 19th WSF Men's World Junior Championship
- Location: Doha Qatar
- Venue: Aspire Academy squash club
- Website www.worldsquash.org/worldjuniors2012/

Results
- Champion: (Egypt) Marwan El Shorbagy
- Runner-up: (Egypt) Mohamed Abouelghar
- Semi-finalists: (Pakistan) D Atlas Khan / (Egypt) M Hesham

The 2012 Men's World Junior Squash Championships is the men's edition of the 2012 World Junior Squash Championships, which serves as the individual world Junior championship for squash players. The event took place at the Khalifa International Tennis and Squash Complex in Doha in Qatar from 7 to 12 July 2012. Marwan El Shorbagy won his second World Junior Open title, defeating Mohamed Abouelghar in the final round.

== Seeds ==
1. [1*] (Egypt) Marwan El Shorbagy (champion)
2. [2*] (Egypt) Mohamed Abouelghar (final)
3. [3/4*] (Pakistan) Danish Atlas Khan (semifinals)
4. [3/4*] (Egypt) Mazen Hesham Ga Sabry (semifinals)
5. [5/8*] (India) Mahesh Mangaonkar (quarterfinals)
6. [5/8*] (England) Ollie Holland (round of 16)
7. [5/8*] (Pakistan) Nasir Iqbal (quarterfinals)
8. [5/8*] (Egypt) Fares Dessouky (quarterfinals)
9. [9/12*] (Qatar) Abdulla Al-Tamimi (round of 16)
10. [9/12*] (England) Thomas Ford (round of 16)
11. [9/12*] (Jordan) Ahmad Al-Saraj (quarterfinals)
12. [9/12*] (Belgium) Jan Van Den Herrewegen (round of 16)
13. [13/16*] (India) Abhishek Pradhan (third round)
14. [13/16*] (Pakistan) Syed Hamzah Shah Bukhari (round of 16)
15. [13/16*] (France) Damien Volland (third round)
16. [13/16*] (Egypt) Ahmed Atef Abdel-Fattah (round of 16)

== Draw and results ==
=== Finals ===
Quarter finals
1	(Egypt) Marwan El Shorbagy	11	11	6	11
5/8	(Pakistan) Nasir Iqbal	5	6	11	9
9/12	(Jordan) Ahmad Al-Saraj	6	8	5
3/4	(Pakistan) Danish Atlas Khan	11	11	11
3/4	(Egypt) Mazen Ga Sabry	11	11	9	11
5/8	(Egypt) Fares Dessouky	7	6	11	7
5/8	(India) Mahesh Mangaonkar	12	11	9	10	10
2	(Egypt) Mohd Abouelghar	10	8	11	12	12

Semi finals
1	(Egypt) Marwan El Shorbagy	12	11	5	11
3/4	(Pakistan) Danish Atlas Khan	10	7	11	4
3/4	(Egypt) Mazen Ga Sabry	11	11	8	9	12
2	(Egypt) Mohd Abouelghar	2	9	11	11	14

Final
1	(Egypt) Marwan El Shorbagy	11	7	11	11
2	(Egypt) Mohd Abouelghar	9	11	7	8

=== Top half ===
==== Section 1 ====
First round
1	(Egypt) Marwan El Shorbagy
(Iran) Erfan Jamshidi	wo
(Guatemala) Jose Rodriguez	11	11	11
(Guatemala) Ricardo Toscano	3	2	3
(New Zealand) Jonathan Barnett	11	11	11
(Zimbabwe) Alex Roscoe	5	4	5
29/32	(Canada) Cameron Seth	11	11	11
17/20	(England) Richie Fallows	11	12	11
(Germany) Felix Auer	7	10	9
(Kuwait) Yousif Ali	4	6	10
(India) Deepak Mishra	11	11	12
(Pakistan) Shahjahan Khan	11	11	11
(New Zealand) Zachary Millar	3	5	8
(India) Kush Kumar	3	5	3
13/16	(Pakistan) Syed Bukhari	11	11	11
9/12	(England) Thomas Ford
(Guatemala) Christian Urrela	wo
(New Zealand) James Cooper
(New Zealand) Todd Redman	11	11	11
(France) Baptiste Masotti	9	9	9
(Germany) Niklas Becher	6	3	5
(England) Taminder Gata-Aura	11	11	11
25/28	(Hong Kong) Cheuk Yan Tang	11	11	11
(Argentina) Francisco Obregon	1	1	4
(Brazil) Cassiano Silva	7	2	3
(South Africa) Luke Willemse	11	11	11
(South Africa) Ruan Oliver	11	7	11	11	9
(Germany) Lukas Wirths	8	11	8	13	11
5/8	(Pakistan) Nasir Iqbal

Second round
1	(Egypt) Marwan El Shorbagy	11	11	11
(Guatemala) Jose Rodriguez	2	3	4
(New Zealand) Jonathan Barnett	11	7	3	3
29/32	(Canada) Cameron Seth	5	11	11	11
17/20	(England) Richie Fallows	11	11	12
(India) Deepak Mishra	2	9	10
(Pakistan) Shahjahan Khan	14	6	4
13/16	(Pakistan) Syed Bukhari	16	11	11
9/12	(England) Thomas Ford	11	11	11
(New Zealand) James Cooper	3	4	2
(New Zealand) Todd Redman	13	11	6	4
(England) Taminder Gata-Aura	15	8	11	11
25/28	(Hong Kong) Cheuk Yan Tang	11	8	11	11
(South Africa) Luke Willemse	5	11	7	8
(Germany) Lukas Wirths	3	5	4
5/8	(Pakistan) Nasir Iqbal	11	11	11

Third round
1	(Egypt) Marwan El Shorbagy	11	11	11
29/32	(Canada) Cameron Seth	3	6	4
17/20	(England) Richie Fallows	12	4	9
13/16	(Pakistan) Syed Bukhari	14	11	11
9/12	(England) Thomas Ford	11	11	12
(England) Taminder Gata-Aura	4	5	10
25/28	(Hong Kong) Cheuk Yan Tang	3	5	1
5/8	(Pakistan) Nasir Iqbal	11	11	11

Round of 16
1	(Egypt) Marwan El Shorbagy	5	12	11	8	11
13/16	(Pakistan) Syed Bukhari	11	10	3	11	3
Quarter finals
1	(Egypt) Marwan El Shorbagy	11	11	6	11
5/8	(Pakistan) Nasir Iqbal	5	6	11	9
9/12	(England) Thomas Ford	7	8	2
5/8	(Pakistan) Nasir Iqbal	11	11	11

==== Section 2 ====
First round
5/8	(England) Ollie Holland
(Australia) Matthew Bridle	wo
(United States) Edward Columbia
(Sweden) Jasper Sharman	7	4	7
(United States) Devin McLaughlin	11	11	11
(Qatar) Abdulwahab Al-Ishaq	4	2	3
25/28	(Kuwait) Yousif Nizar Saleh	11	11	11
21/24	(Japan) Ryosei Kobayashi	11	11	11
(United States) Liam McClintock	7	3	9
(Zimbabwe) Blessing Muhwate	wo
(India) Vivek Dinodia
(Hong Kong) Yeung Ho Wai	11	11	11
(Sweden) Bjorn Angtoft	3	2	4
(Japan) Ryunosuke Tsukue	4	11	4	8
9/12	(Jordan) Ahmad Al-Saraj	11	6	11	11
13/16	(India) Abhishek Pradhan
(Colombia) Mateo Vargas	wo
(Kuwait) Eissa Eshkanani	11	8	9	6
(Switzerland) Manuel Wanner	8	11	11	11
(Colombia) Juan Camilo Vargas	11	11	11
(Qatar) Sadam Mehawesh	3	4	7
(Qatar) Faisal Al-Marri	6	6	1
17/20	(United States) Dylan Murray	11	11	11
29/32	(Brazil) Josemar Silva	11	11	11
(Belgium) Jordy Camps	8	3	3
(United States) Thomas Dembinski	11	11	11
(Switzerland) Remo Handl	6	6	7
(United States) Mason Ripka	11	11	11
(Germany) Andre Ergenz	5	5	4
3/4	(Pakistan) Danish Atlas Khan

Second round
5/8	(England) Ollie Holland	11	7	12	11
(United States) Edward Columbia	5	11	10	5
(United States) Devin Mclaughlin	4	13	11	4
25/28	(Kuwait) Yousif Nizar Saleh	11	15	5	11
21/24	(Japan) Ryosei Kobayashi	11	11	5	11
(India) Vivek Dinodia	3	1	11	7
(Hong Kong) Yeung Ho Wai	7	8	11	6
9/12	(Jordan) Ahmad Al-Saraj	11	11	8	11
13/16	(India) Abhishek Pradhan	11	11	11
(Switzerland) Manuel Wanner	8	5	5
(Colombia) Juan Camilo Vargas	11	11	11
17/24	(United States) Dylan Murray	9	8	4
29/32	(Brazil) Josemar Silva	11	8	8	11	11
(United States) Thomas Dembinski	7	11	11	7	7
(United States) Mason Ripka	6	1	3
3/4	(Pakistan) Danish Atlas Khan	11	11	11

Third round
5/8	(England) Ollie Holland	8	11	11	11
25/28	(Kuwait) Yousif Nizar Saleh	11	9	7	4
21/24	(Japan) Ryosei Kobayashi	7	11	7	7
9/12	(Jordan) Ahmad Al-Saraj	11	9	11	11
13/16	(India) Abhishek Pradhan	9	9	11	7
(Colombia) Juan Camilo Vargas	11	11	7	11
29/32	(Brazil) Josemar Silva	4	3	7
3/4	(Pakistan) Danish Atlas Khan	11	11	11

Round of 16
5/8	(England) Ollie Holland	9	5	5
9/12	(Jordan) Ahmad Al-Saraj	11	11	11
Quarter finals
9/12	(Jordan) Ahmad Al-Saraj	6	8	5
3/4	(Pakistan) Danish Atlas Khan	11	11	11
(Colombia) Juan Camilo Vargas	10	2	0
3/4	(Pakistan) Danish Atlas Khan	12	11	11

=== Bottom half ===
==== Section 1 ====
First round
3/4	(Egypt) Mazen Ga Sabry
(Kuwait) Khaled Al-Jenaidel	5	10	11	5
(France) Auguste Dussourd	11	12	8	11
(Australia) Rohan Toole	3	0	5
(Canada) Tyler Olson	11	11	11
(Argentina) Rodrigo Obregon	8	9	6
29/32	(Australia) Rhys Dowling	11	11	11
17/20	(Egypt) Ahmed Abdel Khalek	11	11	11
(Qatar) Abdulla Al-Mass	2	1	3
(Portugal) Rui Soares	11	12	11	13
(Canada) Tyler Lee	4	14	7	11
(Finland) Jaakko Vahamaa	11	11	11
(Belgium) Vincent Hitchins	7	7	7
(New Zealand) Ben Grindrod	3	8	11	7
13/16	(France) Damien Volland	11	11	1	11
9/12	(Belgium) Jan VD Herrewegen	11	11	11
(Iraq) Mohammed F. Hasan	2	7	3
(Hong Kong) Ho Tse Ho	11	11	11
(Iraq) Faisal A. Khudhair	2	3	3
(Guatemala) Josue Enriquez	11	11	6	11
(Argentina) Federico Cioffi	3	3	11	4
(Afghanistan) Aryan Ahmed	wo
21/24	(Pakistan) Tayyab Aslam
25/28	(Colombia) Andres De Frutos
(Qatar) A. Abdelzaher	wo
(Kuwait) Athbi Khalid Hamad	9	11	9	11	9
(Colombia) Nicolás Valderrama	11	6	11	9	11
(Australia) T.J. Rarere	11	7	11	11
(Iraq) Saifuldeen Salman	6	11	5	2
5/8	(Egypt) Fares Dessouky

Second round
3/4	(Egypt) Mazen Ga Sabry	11	11	11
(France) Auguste Dussourd	4	4	6
(Canada) Tyler Olson	11	6	6	6
29/32	(Australia) Rhys Dowling	9	11	11	11
17/20	(Egypt) Ahmed Abdel Khalek	11	11	11
(Portugal) Rui Soares	6	2	4
(Finland) Jaakko Vahamaa	8	5	7
13/16	(France) Damien Volland	11	11	11
9/12	(Belgium) Jan VD Herrewegen	11	5	12	11
(Hong Kong) Ho Tze Ho	6	11	10	5
(Guatemala) Josue Enriquez	2	5	6
21/24	(Pakistan) Tayyab Aslam	11	11	11
13/16	(Colombia) Andres De Frutos	10	11	11	11
(Colombia) Nicolás Valderrama	12	9	3	3
(Australia) T.J. Rarere	2	4	7
5/8	(Egypt) Fares Dessouky	11	11	11

Third round
3/4	(Egypt) Mazen Ga Sabry	11	11	11
29/32	(Australia) Rhys Dowling	3	4	6
17/20	(Egypt) Ahmed Abdel Khalek	11	11	11
13/16	(France) Damien Volland	5	2	5
9/12	(Belgium) Jan VD Herrewegen	11	7	11	11
21/24	(Pakistan) Tayyab Aslam	7	11	9	9
13/16	(Colombia) Andres De Frutos	5	6	4
5/8	(Egypt) Fares Dessouky	11	11	11

Round of 16
3/4	(Egypt) Mazen Ga Sabry	11	11	11
17/20	(Egypt) Ahmed Abdel Khalek	6	8	3
Quarter finals
3/4	(Egypt) Mazen Ga Sabry	11	11	9	11
5/8	(Egypt) Fares Dessouky	7	6	11	7
9/12	(Belgium) Jan VD Herrewegen	2	9	8
5/8	(Egypt) Fares Dessouky	11	11	11

==== Section 2 ====
First round
5/8	(India) Mah. Mangaonkar
(Canada) Zachary Lemen	11	11	11
(Guatemala) Rodrigo Arreaga	3	6	5
(Australia) Thomas Calvert	11	8	6
(South Africa) Nell Van Der Merwe	13	11	11
(Colombia) Edgar R. Bautista	10	6	5
25/28	(England) Matthew Siddaway	12	11	11
21/24	(France) Alexandre Cogno
(England) Lyell Fuller	wo
(Switzerland) Robin Gadola	11	11	12
(Iraq) Hasanain O. Dakheel	5	5	10
(Japan) Tomotaka Endo	5	5	10
(Canada) Joshua Sekhar	11	11	12
9/12	(Qatar) Abdulla Al-Tamimi
13/16	(Egypt) Ahmed Abdel-Fattah	11	11	11
(South Africa) Simpiwe Gqibane	5	3	7
(Switzerland) Yannick Lindemann	11	11	11
(Zimbabwe) Davis A. Fisher	3	1	5
(Argentina) Gonzalo Gallardo
(Iran) Sohail Shameli	wo
(Portugal) Claudio Pinto	5	11	12	2
17/20	(Hong Kong) Yip Tsz Fung	11	6	14	11
29/32	(India) Vrishab Kotian	11	11	11
(Japan) Taiki Kaido	3	4	4
(Guatemala) Alenjandro Enriquez	wo
(Zimbabwe) Faisal Hassan
(Kuwait) Ahmed A. Al-Tawari	5	1	3
(Brazil) Pedro Veiga	11	11	11
2	(Egypt) Mohd Abouelghar

Second round
5/8	(India) Mah. Mangaonkar	11	11	11
(Canada) Zachary Leman	5	4	9
(South Africa) Nell Van Der Merwe	4	5	7
25/28	(England) Matthew Siddaway	11	11	11
21/24	(France) Alexandre Cogno	7	11	11	11	16
(Switzerland) Robin Gadola	11	3	6	13	14
(Canada) Joshua Sekhar	10	4	14	4
9/12	(Qatar) Abdulla Al-Tamimi	12	11	12	11
13/16	(Egypt) Ahmed Abdel-Fattah	11	11	11
(Switzerland) Yannick Lindemann	8	5	9
(Guatemala) Gonzalo Gallardo	2	4	2
17/20	(Hong Kong) Yip Tsz Fung	11	11	11
29/32	(India) Vrishab Kotian	11	11	11
(Zimbabwe) Faisal Hassan	7	6	12
(Brazil) Pedro Veiga	3	3	5
2	(Egypt) Mohd Abouelghar	11	11	11

Third round
5/8	(India) Mah. Mangaonkar	12	11	11
25/28	(England) Matthew Siddaway	10	2	7
21/24	(France) Alexandre Cogno	7	9	9
9/12	(Qatar) Abdulla Al-Tamimi	11	11	11
13/16	(Egypt) Ahmed Abdel-Fattah	11	11	11
17/20	(Hong Kong) Yip Tsz Fung	8	7	7
29/32	(India) Vrishab Kotian	8	4	4
2	(Egypt) Mohd Abouelghar	11	11	11

Round of 16
5/8	(India) Mah. Mangaonkar	10	11	4
9/12	(Qatar) Abdulla Al-Tamimi	12	3	4	rtd
Quarter finals
5/8	(India) Mahesh Mangaonkar	12	11	9	10	10
2	(Egypt) Mohd Abouelghar	10	8	11	12	12
13/16	(Egypt) Ahmed Abdel-Fattah	7	4	7
2	(Egypt) Mohd Abouelghar	11	11	11

== See also ==
- Men's World Junior Team Squash Championships 2012
- Women's World Junior Squash Championships 2012
- British Junior Open Squash
- World Junior Squash Championships

Preceded by Belgium (Herentals); 2011	Squash World Junior; Qatar (Doha); 2012	Succeeded by Poland (Wroclaw); 2013
