= 2012 Men's World Junior Team Squash Championships =

Men's World Junior Team 2012
- 17th WSF Men's World Junior Team Championship
- Location: Doha Qatar
- Venue: Aspire Academy squash club
- Website www.worldsquash.org/worldjuniors2012/

Results
- Champion: Egypt
- Runner-up: Pakistan
- Third place: India

The 2012 Men's World Junior Team Squash Championships was held in Doha, Qatar. The event took place from 13 to 18 July 2012.

== Seeds ==
1. Egypt (champion)
2. Pakistan (final)
3. England (semifinals)
4. India (semifinals)
5. (Hong Kong) Kong Kong (quarterfinals)
6. United States (quarterfinals)
7. France (first round)
8. Colombia (first round)
9. Australia (first round)
10. Canada (quarterfinals)
11. New Zealand (round of 16)
12. Kuwait (round of 16)

== Group stage results ==
=== Pool A ===
Egypt	3	-	0	Switzerland
Kuwait	2	-	1	Argentina

Egypt	3	-	0	Kuwait
Switzerland	1	-	2	Argentina

Egypt	3	-	0	Argentina
Kuwait	3	-	0	Switzerland

Rank	Nation	Match	Win	Low	Points
1	Egypt	3	3	0	6
2	Kuwait	3	2	1	4
3	Argentina	3	1	2	2
4	Switzerland	3	0	3	0

=== Pool B ===
Pakistan	3	-	0	South Africa
New Zealand	3	-	0	Iraq

Pakistan	3	-	0	New Zealand
South Africa	2	-	1	Iraq

Pakistan	3	-	0	Iraq
New Zealand	3	-	0	South Africa

Rank	Nation	Match	Win	Low	Points
1	Pakistan	3	3	0	6
2	New Zealand	3	2	1	4
3	South Africa	3	1	2	2
4	Iraq	3	0	3	0

=== Pool C ===
England	3	-	0	Belgium
Canada	3	-	0	Zimbabwe

England	3	-	0	Canada
Belgium	3	-	0	Zimbabwe

England	3	-	0	Zimbabwe
Canada	2	-	1	Belgium

Rank	Nation	Match	Win	Low	Points
1	England	3	3	0	6
2	Canada	3	2	1	4
3	Belgium	3	1	2	2
4	Zimbabwe	3	0	3	0

=== Pool D ===
India	3	-	0	Germany
Australia	2	-	1	Qatar

India	3	-	0	Australia
Germany	2	-	1	Qatar

India	3	-	0	Qatar
Australia	1	-	2	Germany

Rank	Nation	Match	Win	Low	Points
1	India	3	2	0	6
2	Germany	3	2	1	4
3	Australia	3	1	2	2
4	Qatar	3	0	3	0

=== Pool E ===
Hong Kong	2	-	1	Japan

Hong Kong	3	-	0	Colombia

Colombia	1	-	2	Japan

Rank	Nation	Match	Win	Low	Points
1	Hong Kong	2	2	0	4
2	Japan	2	1	1	2
3	Colombia	2	0	2	0

=== Pool F ===
United States	3	-	0	Brazil
France	3	-	0	Guatemala

United States	3	-	0	France
Brazil	3	-	0	Guatemala

United States	3	-	0	Guatemala
France	1	-	2	Brazil

Rank	Nation	Match	Win	Low	Points
1	United States	3	3	0	6
2	Brazil	3	2	1	4
3	France	3	1	2	2
4	Guatemala	3	0	3	0

== Finals ==
=== Draw ===
Round of 16
10	Canada	3	3
Brazil	0	0
5	Hong Kong	3	3	2
11	New Zealand	2	0	0
12	Kuwait	1	0
6	United States	3	3
Japan	3	3
Germany	0	0

Quarterfinals
1	Egypt	3	3	2
10	Canada	0	0	0
5	Hong Kong	3	0	1
4	India	0	3	3
3	England	3	3	2
6	United States	1	0	0
Japan	0	0
2	Pakistan	3	3

Semifinals
1	Egypt	3	3	2
4	India	2	1	0
3	England	0	0
2	Pakistan	3	3

Final
1	Egypt	3	3
2	Pakistan	1	0

Third place match
India	3	3
England	0	1

=== Results ===
==== Semi-finals ====
Egypt
3
SEMI FINAL
Doha, Qatar
17 July 2013
Glass Court

India
0

			1	2	3	4	5
1	(Egypt) (India)	N°1 Marwan El Shorbagy; N°1 Mahesh Mangaonkar	9; 11	12; 10	11; 5	6; 11	11; 5
2	(Egypt) (India)	N°2 Mohamed Abouelghar; N°2 Abhishek Pradhan	10; 12	11; 6	11; 8	11; 5
3	(Egypt) (India)	N°3 Mazen Hesham Ga Sabry; N°3 Vrishab Koitan	11; 9	11; 4

England
0
SEMI FINAL
Doha, Qatar
17 July 2013
Glass Court

Pakistan
3

			1	2	3	4	5
1	(England) (Pakistan)	N°1 Ollie Holland; N°1 Nasir Iqbal	5; 11	4; 11	6; 11
2	(England) (Pakistan)	N°2 Tom Ford; N°2 Syed Hamzah Shah Bukhari	7; 11	10; 12	7; 11
3	(England) (Pakistan)	N°3 Richie Fallows; N°3 Syed Ali Mujtaba Shah Bokhari	7; 11	11; 9	6; 11

==== Final ====
Egypt
2
FINAL
Doha, Qatar
18 July 2013
Glass Court

Pakistan
0

			1	2	3	4	5
1	(Egypt) (Pakistan)	N°3 Mazen Hesham Ga Sabry; N°3 Syed Ali Mujtaba Shah Bokhari	7; 11	11; 8	11; 5	11; 6
2	(Egypt) (Pakistan)	N°1 Marwan El Shorbagy; N°1 Nasir Iqbal	11; 9	11; 7	11; 6
3	(Egypt) (Pakistan)	N°2 Mohamed Abouelghar; N°2 Syed Hamzah Shah Bukhari

== Post-tournament team ranking ==
Position	Team	Result
1st	Egypt	Champions
2nd	Pakistan	Final
3rd	India	Semi-final
4th	England	Semi-final
5th	Hong Kong	Quarter-final
6th	Japan	Quarter-final
7th	Canada	Quarter-final
8th	United States	Quarter-final

Position	Team	Result
9th	New Zealand	Round of 16
10th	Kuwait	Round of 16
11th	Germany	Round of 16
12th	Brazil	Round of 16
13th	Colombia	Group Stage
14th	France	Group Stage
15th	South Africa	Group Stage
16th	Argentina	Group Stage

Position	Team	Result
17th	Australia	Group Stage
18th	Belgium	Group Stage
19th	Qatar	Group Stage
20th	Zimbabwe	Group Stage
21st	Iraq	Group Stage
22nd	Switzerland	Group Stage
23rd	Guatemala	Group Stage

== See also ==
- Men's World Junior Squash Championships 2012
- World Junior Squash Championships

Preceded by Ecuador (Quito); 2010	Squash World Junior Team; Qatar (Doha); 2012	Succeeded by Namibia (Windhoek); 2014
