= 2014 Men's World Junior Team Squash Championships =

Men's World Junior Team 2014
- 18th WSF Men's World Junior Team Championship
- Location: Windhoek Namibia
- Website www.wsfworldjuniors.com

Results
- Champion: Egypt
- Runner-up: Pakistan
- Third place: Spain

The 2014 Men's World Junior Team Squash Championships was held in Windhoek, Namibia. The event took place from 16 to 21 August 2014.

== Seeds ==
1. Egypt (champion)
2. Pakistan (final)
3. England (quarterfinals)
4. India (quarterfinals)
5. Malaysia (semifinals)
6. Spain (semifinals)
7. Finland (quarterfinals)
8. (Republic of Ireland) Ireland (quarterfinals)
9. Colombia (round of 16)
10. Canada (first round)
11. Israel (round of 16)
12. United States (round of 16)

== Group stage results ==
=== Pool A ===
Egypt	3	-	0	Botswana
United States	2	-	1	Argentina

Egypt	3	-	0	Argentina
United States	3	-	0	Botswana

Egypt	2	-	1	United States
Argentina	3	-	0	Botswana

Rank	Nation	Match	Win	Low	Points
1	Egypt	3	3	0	6
2	United States	3	2	1	4
3	Argentina	3	1	2	2
4	Botswana	3	0	3	0

=== Pool B ===
Pakistan	3	-	0	Namibia
Israel	2	-	1	Germany

Pakistan	3	-	0	Germany
Israel	3	-	0	Namibia

Pakistan	3	-	0	Israel
Germany	3	-	0	Namibia

Rank	Nation	Match	Win	Low	Points
1	Pakistan	3	3	0	6
2	Israel	3	2	1	4
3	Germany	3	1	2	2
4	Namibia	3	0	3	0

=== Pool C ===
Canada	1	-	2	France

England	3	-	0	France

England	3	-	0	Canada

Rank	Nation	Match	Win	Low	Points
1	England	2	2	0	4
2	France	2	1	1	2
3	Canada	2	0	2	0

=== Pool D ===
India	3	-	0	Guatemala
Colombia	3	-	0	Kuwait

India	3	-	0	Kuwait
Colombia	3	-	0	Guatemala

India	3	-	0	Colombia
Kuwait	2	-	1	Guatemala

Rank	Nation	Match	Win	Low	Points
1	India	3	3	0	6
2	Colombia	3	2	1	4
3	Kuwait	3	1	2	2
4	Guatemala	3	0	3	0

=== Pool E ===
Malaysia	3	-	0	Zimbabwe
(Republic of Ireland) Ireland	2	-	1	South Africa

Malaysia	3	-	0	South Africa
(Republic of Ireland) Ireland	3	-	0	Zimbabwe

Malaysia	2	-	1	(Republic of Ireland) Ireland
South Africa	3	-	0	Zimbabwe

Rank	Nation	Match	Win	Low	Points
1	Malaysia	3	3	0	6
2	(Republic of Ireland) Ireland	3	2	1	4
3	South Africa	3	1	2	2
4	Zimbabwe	3	0	3	0

=== Pool F ===
Spain	3	-	0	Sweden
Finland	3	-	0	New Zealand

Spain	3	-	0	New Zealand
Finland	3	-	0	Sweden

Spain	3	-	0	Finland
New Zealand	2	-	1	Sweden

Rank	Nation	Match	Win	Low	Points
1	Spain	3	3	0	6
2	Finland	3	2	1	4
3	New Zealand	3	1	2	2
4	Sweden	3	0	3	0

== Finals ==
=== Draw ===
Round of 16
France	2	2
8	(Republic of Ireland) Ireland	3	3
6	Spain	3	0	3
11	Israel	0	3	0
12	United States	3	1	0
5	Malaysia	0	3	3
7	Finland	2	3	3
9	Colombia	3	1	0

Quarterfinals
1	Egypt	3	3	3
8	(Republic of Ireland) Ireland	0	0	0
6	Spain	3	2	3
4	India	0	3	1
3	England	2	3	0
5	Malaysia	3	1	3
7	Finland	0	0
2	Pakistan	3	3

Semifinals
1	Egypt	3	3
6	Spain	1	2
5	Malaysia	1	0
2	Pakistan	3	3

Final
1	Egypt	3	3
2	Pakistan	1	2

Third place match
6	Spain	3	3
5	Malaysia	0	0

=== Results ===
==== Semi-finals ====
Egypt
2
SEMI FINAL
Windhoek Namibia
20 August 2014
Glass Court

Spain
0

			1	2	3	4	5
1	(Egypt) (Spain)	N°1 Omar El Atmas; N°1 Edmon Lopez-Moller	10; 12	12; 10	11; 4	11; 5
2	(Egypt) (Spain)	N°3 Karim El Hammamy; N°3 Bernat Jaume	10; 12	11; 6	11; 7	10; 12	11; 6
3	(Egypt) (Spain)	N°2 Youssef Aboul-Makarim; N°2 Iker Pajares

Malaysia
0
SEMI FINAL
Windhoek Namibia
20 August 2014
Glass Court

Pakistan
2

			1	2	3	4	5
1	(Malaysia) (Pakistan)	N°1 Mohammad Syafiq Kamal; N°1 Tayyab Aslam	5; 11	11; 5	6; 11	8; 11
2	(Malaysia) (Pakistan)	N°3 Darren Chan Ti Luun; N°3 Asim Khan	5; 11	7; 11	9; 11
3	(Malaysia) (Pakistan)	N°2 Eain Yow Ng; N°2 Syed Ali Bokhari

==== Final ====
Egypt
2
FINAL
Windhoek Namibia
21 August 2014
Glass Court

Pakistan
0

			1	2	3	4	5
1	(Egypt) (Pakistan)	N°1 Omar El Atmas; N°1 Tayyab Aslam	12; 10	12; 10	6; 11	11; 8
2	(Egypt) (Pakistan)	N°2 Youssef Aboul-Makarim; N°2 Syed Ali Bokhari	11; 7	9; 11	11; 3	7; 11	11; 9
3	(Egypt) (Pakistan)	N°3 Karim El Hammamy; N°3 Asim Khan

== Post-tournament team ranking ==
Position	Team	Result
1st	Egypt	Champions
2nd	Pakistan	Final
3rd	Spain	Semi-final
4th	Malaysia	Semi-final
5th	England	Quarter-final
6th	India	Quarter-final
7th	(Republic of Ireland) Ireland	Quarter-final
8th	Finland	Quarter-final

Position	Team	Result
9th	United States	Round of 16
10th	Israel	Round of 16
11th	France	Round of 16
12th	Colombia	Round of 16
13th	Canada	Group Stage
14th	Argentina	Group Stage
15th	Sweden	Group Stage
16th	Kuwait	Group Stage

Position	Team	Result
17th	South Africa	Group Stage
18th	New Zealand	Group Stage
19th	Germany	Group Stage
20th	Zimbabwe	Group Stage
21st	Guatemala	Group Stage
22nd	Namibia	Group Stage
23rd	Botswana	Group Stage

== See also ==
- 2014 Men's World Junior Squash Championships
- World Junior Squash Championships

Preceded by Qatar (Doha); 2012	Squash World Junior Team; Namibia (Windhoek); 2014	Succeeded by Men's World Junior Team; 2016
