= Osama Khalifa =

Egyptian squash player

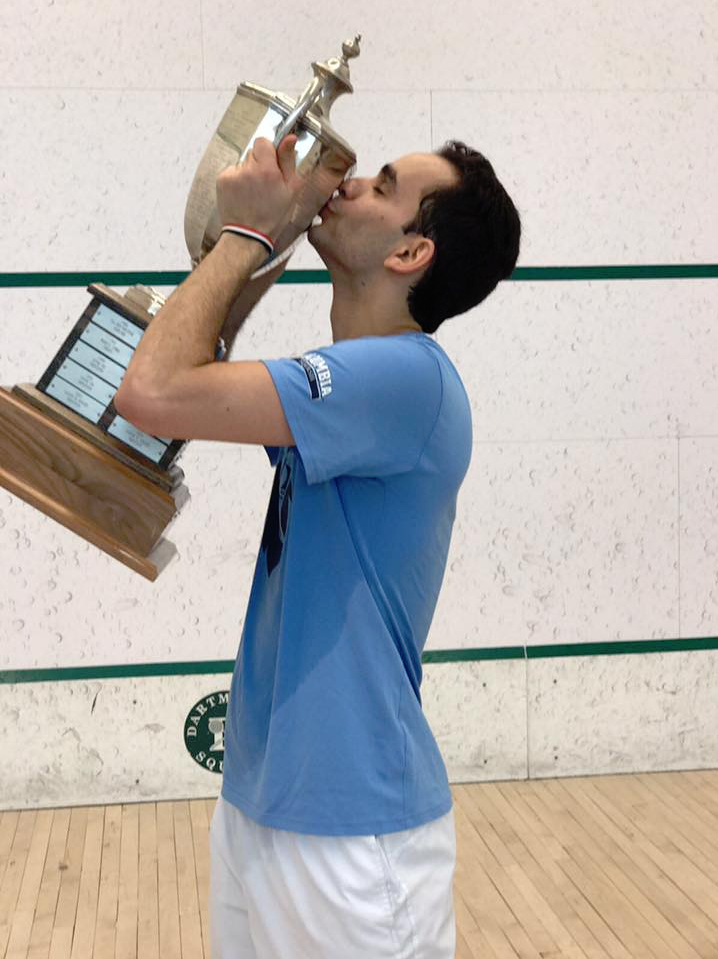
- Khalifa celebrates winning the national collegiate title at Dartmouth College.

Personal information
- Full name: Osama Khaled Khalifa
- Nickname: Sam
- Born: March 19, 1995 (age 31) Cairo, Egypt
- Education: Columbia (2014–present)
- Height: 1.90 m (6 ft 3 in)
- Weight: 86 kg (190 lb)

Sport
- Country: Egypt
- Handedness: Right-handed
- League: Ivy League
- Team: Columbia Lions
- Coached by: Amr Khaled Khalifa
- Retired: Active
- Racquet used: Tecnifibre

Career Highlights and Awards: 4x 1st-team All-American (2015, 2016, 2017, 2018); 4x 1st-team All-Ivy League (2015, 2016, 2017, 2018); 3x Academic All-Ivy (2015, 2016, 2018); 3x Ivy League Player of the Year (2016, 2017, 2018); Ivy League Rookie of the Year (2015); William V. Campbell Performer of the Year (male), Columbia University (2017); Skillman Award (2018); Connie S. Maniatty Outstanding Senior Student Athlete (male), Columbia University (2018)

Osama Khaled Khalifa (Arabic: أسامة خليفة) (born March 19, 1995, in Cairo, Egypt) is a professional squash player who competed for Columbia University. Khalifa was the #1-ranked US college squash player and the 2017 Collegiate National Champion, the first-ever Columbia player to win the national title.

== Early life and education ==
Born in Cairo, Khalifa first became a regional swimming champion, before turning his full attention to squash at age 10. He has four siblings, including older brother Amr Khaled Khalifa, who won the individual and team World Junior Squash Championships in 2010. Khalifa attended the Sakkara International School in Cairo. He then matriculated to Deerfield Academy in Deerfield, Massachusetts in 2012 as a high school junior, and graduated in 2014. Khalifa went on to attend Columbia University where he graduated with a B.A. in statistics in May 2018.

== Junior Squash career ==
Khalifa trained with the Egyptian national team from age 11, and participated in all of the major international junior tournaments. He won the British Junior Open Squash Under-13 group in 2008 and the French Junior Open Squash U15 in 2010. He also won the German Pioneer Cup U17 and the Dutch Junior Open in the U17 and U19 categories. At age 16, he was one of the youngest players ever to win the Dutch Junior Open.

In the summer of 2012, at age 17, Khalifa competed in the PSA Barossa Valley Open in Australia, where he beat the then world number 6 Paul Coll to reach the finals of his first professional squash tournament.

In September 2012, Khalifa moved to the United States, enrolling at Deerfield Academy. Khalifa went undefeated during his two-year tenure at Deerfield. He led Deerfield Academy to finish at their best ever, 4th-place position at the United States High School Team Squash Championships held in Philadelphia in February 2013, and a 2nd-place finish at the New England Championships. He won the New England High School Individual Championship title both years he competed, in 2013 and 2014.

Khalifa reached the finals of the US Junior Open Championship in December 2012, losing to compatriot Karim El Hammamy, who became the Individual World Junior Champion later that season. In February 2013, Khalifa represented the winning Egyptian national team in the World Junior Squash Championships in Wroclaw, Poland.

== College Squash career ==
In September 2014, Khalifa matriculated to Columbia University. During his freshman year, Khalifa garnered the Ivy League Rookie of the Year award, was named a 1st Team All-American, and finished #2 in the Nation.

In Spring 2015, the Columbia Lions climbed from 6th place to their best-ever 4th place overall at the United States Intercollegiate Team Squash Championships held at Trinity College in Connecticut. Khalifa was named a co-captain of the Columbia team for the 2015-16 year, the first sophomore captain in the history of the program.

Over sophomore year, Khalifa set a 7–0 Ancient Eight record at the No. 1 position, becoming the second player in program history to earn Ivy League Player of the Year honors. A 9–0 regular season record and a CSA National Championships Pool Trophy (A Division) appearance led to his second consecutive 1st Team All-American and 1st Team All-Ivy selection.

Over junior year as co-captain, #1 nationally ranked Khalifa became the first-ever Columbia squash player to win a national championship, defeating Rochester's Mario Yanez in the finals of the Individual National Championships A Division held at Dartmouth College. At the CSA championship he posted wins over Drexel's Omar El Atmas, Harvard's Saadeldin Abouaish, and St. Lawrence's Mohamed El Gawarhy. Khalifa earned the 1st Team All-American and 1st Team All-Ivy honors for the third straight season and became the Ivy League Player of the Year for the second consecutive season. He was named the William V. Campbell Performer of the Year (male), Columbia University's top annual athletic award.

Over senior year, Khalifa lead the team to a historic first-ever Ivy League Championship title, clinching a 3–2 win over Harvard's Saadeldin Abouaish, and a 3–0 win over UPenn's Andrew Douglas to seal the title. Khalifa co-captained the Lions for a third year, posted a 12–2 regular season record at the No. 1 position, and became second-ever Columbia player to win the Skillman Award (most prestigious individual skill and sportsmanship award by the College Squash Association).

At the College Team Nationals, Khalifa went 3–0 with wins over Rochester's Ashley Davies, Harvard's Saadeldin Abouaish and St. Lawrence's Ahmed Bayoumy. Finishing off his college career, Khalifa won the Ivy League Player of the Year for a third consecutive year. He was also unanimously selected, for the fourth consecutive year, as both First-Team All-Ivy League and First-Team All-American. Khalifa was named the Connie S. Maniatty Outstanding Senior Student Athlete (male) during Columbia University's top annual athletic award in recognition of his illustrious college career.

== Professional Squash doubles career ==
Khalifa began playing professional squash doubles on the Squash Doubles Association tour in March 2022. In April 2024, Khalifa became the first Egyptian to reach number one in the world. In the 2023–24 season, Khalifa won four titles, including the Diamond State Open in Wilmington, the North American Open, the MFS Boston ProAm, and the Kellner Cup.
