= 2022 Men's British Open Squash Championship =

British Open
- Men's British Open

Details
- Event name: 2022 Allam British Open
- Location: Hull, England
- Venue: University of Hull Sports Complex
- Dates: 28 March to 3 April 2022

Men's Winner
- Prize money: $180,000
- Year: 2021–22 PSA World Tour

The Men's 2022 Allam British Open was the men's edition of the 2022 British Open Squash Championships, which is a 2021–22 PSA World Tour event. The event took place at the Sports Complex at the University of Hull in Hull in England between 28 March and 3 April 2022. The event was sponsored by Dr Assem Allam.

In a repeat of the 2021 final New Zealand's Paul Coll defeated Egypt's Ali Farag.

== Seeds ==
1. (Egypt) Ali Farag (runner-up)
2. (New Zealand) Paul Coll (champion)
3. (Egypt) Mohamed Elshorbagy (second round)
4. (Egypt) Mostafa Asal (semi-finals)
5. (Egypt) Tarek Momen (quarter-finals)
6. (Peru) Diego Elías (quarter-finals)
7. (Egypt) Marwan Elshorbagy (third round)
8. (Wales) Joel Makin (second round)

== Draw and results ==
=== Semi-finals and final ===
Semi-finals
1 | (Egypt) Ali Farag | 11 | 6 | 11 | 11
(Egypt) Mazen Hesham | 5 | 11 | 7 | 6
2 | (New Zealand) Paul Coll | 11 | 11 | 11
4 | (Egypt) Mostafa Asal | 9 | 9 | 9

Final
1 | (Egypt) Ali Farag | 10 | 6 | 4
2 | (New Zealand) Paul Coll | 12 | 11 | 11

=== Main Draw ===
==== Top half ====
First round
1 | (Egypt) Ali Farag
[Bye]
(England) Nick Wall | 11 | 7 | 11 | 10 | 11
(France) Victor Crouin | 3 | 11 | 9 | 12 | 8
(Egypt) Karim Abdel Gawad
[Bye]
(England) George Parker | 11 | 12 | 11
(England) Mahesh Mangaonkar | 9 | 10 | 4
(Egypt) Karim El Hammamy | 4 | 11 | 5 | 11
(Spain) Borja Golan | 11 | 3 | 11 | 13
(England) Sam Todd | 7 | 3 | 6
(France) Baptiste Masotti | 11 | 11 | 11
(Malaysia) Eain Yow Ng
[Bye]
5 | (Egypt) Tarek Momen
[Bye]
7 | (Egypt) Marwan ElShorbagy
[Bye]
(Spain) Edmon López | 4 | 5 | 4
(United States) Todd Harrity | 11 | 11 | 11
(Egypt) Mazen Hesham
[Bye]
(Pakistan) Tayyab Aslam | 11 | 7 | 9 | 3
(Egypt) Mohamed ElSherbini | 9 | 11 | 11 | 11
(France) Lucas Serme | 8 | 7 | 3
(India) Ramit Tandon | 11 | 11 | 11
(Mexico) Leonel Cárdenas | 7 | 4 | 16 | 11 | 5
(Switzerland) Nicolas Müller | 11 | 11 | 14 | 2 | 11
(Germany) Raphael Kandra | 12 | 11 | 11
(Spain) Bernat Jaume | 10 | 5 | 6
[Bye]
3 | (Egypt) Mohamed Elshorbagy

Second round
1 | (Egypt) Farag | 11 | 11 | 12
(England) Wall | 6 | 5 | 10
(Egypt) Gawad | 11 | 8 | 11 | 11 | 11
(England) Parker | 8 | 11 | 7 | 13 | 4
(Spain) Golan | 6 | 4 | 9
(France) Masotti | 11 | 11 | 11
(Malaysia) Ng | 7 | 8 | 9
5 | (Egypt) Momen | 11 | 11 | 11
7 | (Egypt) El Shorbagy | 4 | 8 | 11 | 11 | 11
(United States) Harrity | 11 | 11 | 5 | 9 | 7
(Egypt) Hesham | 11 | 11 | 11
(Egypt) ElSherbini | 9 | 5 | 8
(India) Tandon | 12 | 5 | 4
(Switzerland) Müller | 14 | 11 | 11
(Germany) Kandra | 4 | 11 | 7 | 11 | 11
3 | (Egypt) El Shorbagy | 11 | 6 | 11 | 5 | 5

Third round
1 | (Egypt) Farag | 11 | 11 | 11
(Egypt) Gawad | 8 | 4 | 9
(France) Masotti | 11 | 6 | 11 | 9
5 | (Egypt) Momen | 13 | 11 | 9 | 11
7 | (Egypt) El Shorbagy | 9 | 11 | 10 | 11 | 5
(Egypt) Hesham | 11 | 9 | 12 | 4 | 11
(Switzerland) Müller | 11 | 9 | 11 | 12
(Germany) Kandra | 6 | 11 | 5 | 10

Quarter-finals
1 | (Egypt) Farag | 6 | 11 | 14 | 11
5 | (Egypt) Momen | 11 | 9 | 12 | 5
Semi-finals
1 | (Egypt) Farag | 11 | 6 | 11 | 11
(Egypt) Hesham | 8 | 11 | 7 | 6
(Egypt) Hesham | 11 | 11 | 11 | 11 | 11
(Switzerland) Müller | 7 | 13 | 3 | 13 | 5

==== Bottom half ====
First round
4 | (Egypt) Mostafa Asal
[Bye]
(Egypt) Fares Dessouky
[Bye]
(England) Patrick Rooney | 11 | 12 | 8 | 11
(England) Declan James | 7 | 10 | 11 | 8
(Scotland) Greg Lobban | 1 | 11 | 5 | 10
(Egypt) Omar Mosaad | 11 | 7 | 11 | 12
(England) Adrian Waller | 11 | 11 | 8 | 9 | 11
(Switzerland) Dimitri Steinmann | 6 | 9 | 11 | 11 | 3
(Egypt) Youssef Soliman
[Bye]
(Colombia) Miguel Ángel Rodríguez
[Bye]
8 | (Wales) Joel Makin
[Bye]
6 | (Peru) Diego Elías
[Bye]
(Egypt) Youssef Ibrahim
[Bye]
(United States) Shahjahan Khan | 7 | 11 | 11 | 11
(Scotland) Alan Clyne | 11 | 6 | 7 | 8
(France) Sebastien Bonmalais | 11 | 11 | 11
(Spain) Iker Pajares Bernabeu | 5 | 9 | 1
(France) Gregoire Marche
[Bye]
(Qatar) Abdulla Al-Tamimi | 6 | 11 | 9 | 9
(Egypt) Moustafa El Sirty | 11 | 2 | 11 | 11
(England) Nathan Lake | 15 | 11 | 15 | 11
(France) Auguste Dussourd | 13 | 8 | 17 | 7
2 | (New Zealand) Paul Coll
[Bye]

Second round
4 | (Egypt) Asal | 11 | 8 | 11 | 8 | 11
(Egypt) Dessouky | 9 | 11 | 5 | 11 | 7
(England) Rooney | 11 | 11 | 9 | 11
(Egypt) Mosaad | 4 | 5 | 11 | 7
(England) Waller | 11 | 11 | 9
(Egypt) Soliman | 13 | 13 | 11
(Colombia) Rodríguez | 5 | 11 | 3 | 11 | 11
8 | (Wales) Makin | 11 | 3 | 11 | 9 | 5
6 | (Peru) Elías | 8 | 4 | 11 | 11 | 11
(Egypt) Ibrahim | 11 | 11 | 5 | 4 | 4
(United States) Khan | 11 | 13 | 5 | 11
(France) Bonmalais | 7 | 11 | 11 | 6
(France) Marche | 11 | 11 | 11
(Egypt) El Sirty | 5 | 9 | 1
(England) Lake | 3 | 4 | 7
2 | (New Zealand) Coll | 11 | 11 | 11

Third round
4 | (Egypt) Asal | 12 | 11 | 11
(England) Rooney | 10 | 9 | 6
(Egypt) Soliman | 11 | 4 | 5 | 8
(Colombia) Rodríguez | 6 | 11 | 11 | 11
6 | (Peru) Elías | 11 | 11 | 11
(United States) Khan | 4 | 9 | 7
(France) Marche | 10 | 6 | 9
2 | (New Zealand) Coll | 12 | 11 | 11

Quarter-finals
4 | (Egypt) Asal | 12 | 11 | 11
(Colombia) Rodríguez | 10 | 7 | 5
Semi-finals
4 | (Egypt) Asal | 9 | 9 | 9
2 | (New Zealand) Coll | 11 | 11 | 11
6 | (Peru) Elías | 7 | 8 | 8
2 | (New Zealand) Coll | 11 | 11 | 11

== See also ==
- 2022 Women's British Open Squash Championship
