= 2015 Men's World Junior Squash Championships =

Men's World Junior 2015
- 22nd WSF Men's World Junior Championship
- Location: Eindhoven Netherlands
- Website www.wsfworldjuniors.com

Results
- Champion: (Peru) Diego Elías
- Runner-up: (Egypt) Youssef Soliman
- Semi-finalists: (Malaysia) E Yow Ng / (Egypt) S E Abouaish

The 2015 Men's World Junior Squash Championships is the men's edition of the 2015 World Junior Squash Championships, which serves as the individual world Junior championship for squash players. The event took place in Eindhoven in the Netherlands from 26 to 30 July 2015. Diego Elías won his second World Junior Open title, defeating Youssef Soliman in the final.

== Seeds ==
1. [1*] (Peru) Diego Elías (champion)
2. [2*] (Pakistan) Tayyab Aslam (quarterfinals)
3. [3/4*] (Egypt) Youssef Soliman (final)
4. [3/4*] (Egypt) Amr Moustafa Arafa (second round)
5. [5/8*] (Pakistan) Israr Ahmed (quarterfinals)
6. [5/8*] (Malaysia) Eain Yow Ng (semifinals)
7. [5/8*] (England) Patrick Rooney (quarterfinals)
8. [5/8*] (Egypt) Saadeldin Ehab Abouaish (semifinals)
9. [9/12*] (Jordan) Mohammad Al Sarraj (round of 16)
10. [9/12*] (Egypt) Youssef Ibrahim Abdallah (round of 16)
11. [9/12*] (England) James Peach (third round)
12. [9/12*] (Egypt) Adham Madi (third round)
13. [13/16*] (Australia) Solayman Nowrozi (second round)
14. [13/16*] (India) Sandeep Ramachandran (second round)
15. [13/16*] (Switzerland) Dimitri Steinmann (third round)
16. [13/16*] (France) Benjamin Aubert (third round)

== Draw and results ==
=== Finals ===
Quarter finals
1 | (Peru) Diego Elías | 11 | 11 | 11
5/8 | (Pakistan) Israr Ahmed | 6 | 8 | 4
5/8 | (Malaysia) Eain Yow Ng | 11 | 11 | 10 | 11
(Pakistan) Asim Khan | 4 | 6 | 12 | 9
3/4 | (Egypt) Youssef Soliman | 11 | 12 | 11
5/8 | (England) Patrick Rooney | 8 | 10 | 4
5/8 | (Egypt) Saadeldin Abouaish | 6 | 11 | 11 | 15
2 | (Pakistan) Tayyab Aslam | 11 | 8 | 5 | 13

Semi finals
1 | (Peru) Diego Elías | 11 | 11 | 11
5/8 | (Malaysia) Eain Yow Ng | 4 | 1 | 2
3/4 | (Egypt) Youssef Soliman | 11 | 11 | 7 | 11
5/8 | (Egypt) Saadeldin Abouaish | 5 | 5 | 11 | 8

Final
1 | (Peru) Diego Elías | 11 | 11 | 11
3/4 | (Egypt) Youssef Soliman | 6 | 9 | 8

=== Top half ===
==== Section 1 ====
First round
1 | (Peru) Diego Elías
(Iran) Sajad Zareian | wo
(South Africa) J.-P. Van Der Merwe
(France) Adrien Grondin
(Qatar) Umair Zaman
(United States) Timothy Brownell
(Netherlands) Bart Horstman | 11 | 12 | 11
(Belgium) Yvi Roggen | 4 | 10 | 6
(Colombia) Matías Knudsen | 10 | 4 | 3
(Sweden) Tor Christoffersen | 12 | 11 | 11
13/16 | (Switzerland) Dimitri Steinmann
9/12 | (Egypt) Youssef I. Abdallah
(Czech Republic) Yanick Buric | wo
(Netherlands) Thijs Roukens
(India) Aishwary Singh
(Spain) Nilo Vidal | wo
(New Zealand) Luke Jones
(England) Kyle Finch
(Denmark) Theis Houlberg
(Nigeria) Abdullahi Alhaji Musa | wo
(Kuwait) Mohammad Ali
5/8 | (Pakistan) Israr Ahmed

Second round
1 | (Peru) Diego Elías | 11 | 11 | 11
(South Africa) J.-P. Van Der Merwe | 4 | 1 | 3
(France) Adrien Grondin | 11 | 14 | 11
(Qatar) Umair Zaman | 7 | 12 | 4
(United States) Timothy Brownell | 11 | 11 | 11
(Netherlands) Bart Horstman | 4 | 2 | 4
(Sweden) Tor Christoffersen | 11 | 11 | 6 | 9 | 7
13/16 | (Switzerland) Dimitri Steinmann | 8 | 4 | 11 | 11 | 11
9/12 | (Egypt) Youssef I. Abdallah | 11 | 11 | 11
(Netherlands) Thijs Roukens | 4 | 5 | 5
(India) Aishwary Singh | 8 | 8 | 7
(New Zealand) Luke Jones | 11 | 11 | 11
(England) Kyle Finch | 11 | 11 | 11
(Denmark) Theis Houlberg | 8 | 7 | 3
(Kuwait) Mohammad Ali | 3 | 1 | 3
5/8 | (Pakistan) Israr Ahmed | 11 | 11 | 11

Third round
1 | (Peru) Diego Elías | 11 | 11 | 11
(France) Adrien Grondin | 6 | 2 | 2
(United States) Timothy Brownell | 10 | 11 | 11 | 8 | 11
13/16 | (Switzerland) Dimitri Steinmann | 12 | 5 | 3 | 11 | 9
9/12 | (Egypt) Youssef I. Abdallah | 14 | 11 | 11
(New Zealand) Luke Jones | 12 | 7 | 2
(England) Kyle Finch | 10 | 11 | 4 | 9
5/8 | (Pakistan) Israr Ahmed | 12 | 8 | 11 | 11

Round of 16
1 | (Peru) Diego Elías | 11 | 11 | 11
(United States) Timothy Brownell | 3 | 3 | 5
Quarter finals
1 | (Peru) Diego Elías | 11 | 11 | 11
5/8 | (Pakistan) Israr Ahmed | 4 | 8 | 6
9/12 | (Egypt) Youssef I. Abdallah | 11 | 8 | 9 | 11 | 4
5/8 | (Pakistan) Israr Ahmed | 1 | 11 | 11 | 7 | 11

==== Section 2 ====
First round
5/8 | (Malaysia) Eain Yow Ng
(Switzerland) Christoph Zust | 11 | 11 | 11
(Czech Republic) Filip Kočárek | 5 | 1 | 7
(Germany) Tobias Weggen
(Netherlands) Tess Jutte
(India) Velav. Senthilkumar
(Kuwait) Mohd Abdul. Al-Terki | wo
(South Africa) Justin Wesson
(Colombia) Juan Laguna | 6 | 6 | 8
(England) Bradley Masters | 11 | 11 | 11
9/12 | (Jordan) Mohd Al Sarraj
13/16 | (Australia) Solayman Nowrozi
(Sweden) Nich. Goth-Errington | 1 | 2 | 6
(United States) Gabriel Morgan | 11 | 11 | 11
(France) Mathias Grondin | 14 | 1 | 5 | 2
(Mexico) Jorge Gomez | 12 | 11 | 11 | 11
(Pakistan) Asim Khan
(Kuwait) Ali Ahmad Aber
(Iran) Mohd R. Jafarzadeh
(Qatar) Abd. Khalid Al-Ishaq | wo
(England) Charlie Lee
3/4 | (Egypt) Amr Moustafa Arafa

Second round
5/8 | (Malaysia) Eain Yow Ng | 11 | 11 | 11
(Switzerland) Christoph Zust | 4 | 1 | 5
(Germany) Tobias Weggen | 11 | 11 | 11
(Netherlands) Tess Jutte | 8 | 8 | 8
(India) Velav. Senthilkumar | 16 | 11 | 11
(South Africa) Justin Wesson | 14 | 3 | 4
(England) Bradley Masters | 11 | 15 | 8 | 4
9/12 | (Jordan) Mohd Al Sarraj | 5 | 17 | 11 | 11
13/16 | (Australia) Solayman Nowrozi | 11 | 6 | 7 | 11 | 14
(United States) Gabriel Morgan | 8 | 11 | 11 | 8 | 16
(Mexico) Jorge Gomez | 9 | 7 | 6
(Pakistan) Asim Khan | 11 | 11 | 11
(Kuwait) Ali Ahmad Aber
(Iran) Mohd R. Jafarzadeh | wo
(England) Charlie Lee | 11 | 6 | 11 | 10 | 11
3/4 | (Egypt) Amr Moustafa Arafa | 5 | 11 | 6 | 11 | 9

Third round
5/8 | (Malaysia) Eain Yow Ng | 11 | 11 | 11
(Germany) Tobias Weggen | 2 | 4 | 7
(India) Velav. Senthilkumar | 11 | 4 | 8 | 13 | 5
9/12 | (Jordan) Mohd Al Sarraj | 5 | 11 | 11 | 11 | 11
(United States) Gabriel Morgan | 3 | 11 | 9 | 3
(Pakistan) Asim Khan | 11 | 8 | 11 | 11
(Kuwait) Ali Ahmad Aber | 4 | 2 | 1
(England) Charlie Lee | 11 | 11 | 11

Round of 16
5/8 | (Malaysia) Eain Yow Ng | 11 | 11 | 11 | 10 | 11
9/12 | (Jordan) Mohammad Al Sarraj | 6 | 9 | 13 | 12 | 6
Quarter finals
5/8 | (Malaysia) Eain Yow Ng | 11 | 11 | 10 | 11
(Pakistan) Asim Khan | 4 | 6 | 12 | 9
(Pakistan) Asim Khan | 11 | 11 | 11
(England) Charlie Lee | 8 | 4 | 2

=== Bottom half ===
==== Section 1 ====
First round
3/4 | (Egypt) Youssef Soliman
(Ukraine) Dmytro Pogrebnyak | 4 | 8 | 7
(Pakistan) Abbas Shoukat | 11 | 11 | 11
(Germany) Yannik Omlor
(Belgium) Cedric De Vos
(Hungary) Balázs Farkas
(Switzerland) Roman Allinckx
(Iran) Amirhossein Feizpour | wo
(India) Vikas Mehra | 11 | 13 | 9 | 11
(Kuwait) Essa Mohammed | 5 | 11 | 11 | 9
13/16 | (France) Benjamin Aubert
9/12 | (Egypt) Adham Madi
(Sweden) John Henryz | 5 | 6 | 4
(South Africa) Dewald Van Niekerk | 11 | 11 | 11
(Switzerland) Jan Kurzmeyer | 3 | 7 | 6
(Colombia) Santiago Orozco | 11 | 11 | 11
(Australia) Sam Ejtemai
(France) Enzo Corigliano
(United States) Max Reed
(Netherlands) Thijs Van Der Pluijm | 6 | 3 | 3
(India) Adithya Raghavan | 11 | 11 | 11
5/8 | (England) Patrick Rooney

Second round
3/4 | (Egypt) Youssef Soliman | 9 | 11 | 11 | 11
(Pakistan) Abbas Shoukat | 11 | 6 | 4 | 5
(Germany) Yannik Omlor | 11 | 11 | 11
(Belgium) Cedric De Vos | 7 | 5 | 3
(Hungary) Balázs Farkas | 11 | 11 | 11
(Switzerland) Roman Allinckx | 5 | 6 | 2
(India) Vikas Mehra | 4 | 11 | 2 | 9
13/16 | (France) Benjamin Aubert | 11 | 9 | 11 | 11
9/12 | (Egypt) Adham Madi | 13 | 11 | 11
(South Africa) Dewald Van Niekerk | 11 | 5 | 5
(Colombia) Santiago Orozco | 2 | 6 | 1
(Australia) Sam Ejtemai | 11 | 11 | 11
(France) Enzo Corigliano | 6 | 11 | 14 | 11
(United States) Max Reed | 11 | 9 | 12 | 8
(India) Adithya Raghavan | 5 | 7 | 5
5/8 | (England) Patrick Rooney | 11 | 11 | 11

Third round
3/4 | (Egypt) Youssef Soliman | 11 | 11 | 11
(Germany) Yannik Omlor | 3 | 7 | 4
(Hungary) Balázs Farkas | 11 | 8 | 11 | 11
13/16 | (France) Benjamin Aubert | 1 | 11 | 1 | 7
9/12 | (Egypt) Adham Madi | 6 | 11 | 11 | 11
(Australia) Sam Ejtemai | 11 | 13 | 6 | 13
(France) Enzo Corigliano | 6 | 14 | rtd
5/8 | (England) Patrick Rooney | 11 | 16

Round of 16
3/4 | (Egypt) Youssef Soliman | 11 | 11 | 11
(Hungary) Balázs Farkas | 4 | 5 | 6
Quarter finals
3/4 | (Egypt) Youssef Soliman | 11 | 11 | 11
5/8 | (England) Patrick Rooney | 8 | 10 | 4
(Australia) Sam Ejtemai | 4 | 8 | 5
5/8 | (England) Patrick Rooney | 11 | 11 | 11

==== Section 2 ====
First round
5/8 | (Egypt) Saadeld. Abouaish
(United States) Sean Hughes | 11 | 11 | 14
(Belgium) Sanjay Jeeva | 7 | 9 | 12
(Netherlands) Donny Van Hal
(Czech Republic) Dominik Dubsky
(Finland) Miko Äijänen
(Sweden) Filip Hultman
(Iran) Alireza Shameli | wo
(Switzerland) Amadeo Costa | 11 | 11 | 11
(Denmark) Casper K. Skaarenborg | 3 | 6 | 3
9/12 | (England) James Peach
13/16 | (India) San. Ramachandran
(Japan) Ryunosuke Tsukue | 11 | 11 | 11
(Kuwait) Khaled Aljenaidel | 8 | 5 | 6
(Nigeria) Olamilekan Oyewole | wo
(France) Victor Crouin
(Pakistan) Ahsan Ayaz
(Qatar) Azlan Amjad
(Colombia) Ronald Palomino
(United States) Spencer Lovejoy | 11 | 11 | 11
(Sweden) Anton Larsson | 7 | 1 | 3
2 | (Pakistan) Tayyab Aslam

Second round
5/8 | (Egypt) Saadeld. Abouaish | 11 | 11 | 11
(United States) Sean Hughes | 6 | 7 | 4
(Netherlands) Donny Van Hal | 11 | 8 | 11 | 5 | 7
(Czech Republic) Dominik Dubsky | 6 | 11 | 9 | 11 | 11
(Finland) Miko Äijänen | 11 | 11 | 5 | 11
(Sweden) Filip Hultman | 4 | 6 | 11 | 8
(Switzerland) Amadeo Costa | 4 | 4 | 3
9/12 | (England) James Peach | 11 | 11 | 11
13/16 | (India) Sand. Ramachandran | 11 | 6 | 11 | 11 | 2
(Japan) Ryunosuke Tsukue | 9 | 11 | 9 | 13 | 11
(France) Victor Crouin | 8 | 15 | 11 | 12
(Pakistan) Ahsan Ayaz | 11 | 13 | 4 | 10
(Qatar) Azlan Amjad | 6 | 7 | 20 | 11 | 11
(Colombia) Ronald Palomino | 11 | 11 | 18 | 7 | 4
(United States) Spencer Lovejoy | 8 | 9 | 9
2 | (Pakistan) Tayyab Aslam | 11 | 11 | 11

Third round
5/8 | (Egypt) Saadeld. Abouaish | 11 | 11 | 11
(Czech Republic) Dominik Dubsky | 2 | 5 | 9
(Finland) Miko Äijänen | 11 | 7 | 11 | 14
9/12 | (England) James Peach | 9 | 11 | 5 | 12
(Japan) Ryunosuke Tsukue | 11 | 11 | 11
(France) Victor Crouin | 9 | 1 | 2
(Qatar) Azlan Amjad | 12 | 3 | 6 | 7
2 | (Pakistan) Tayyab Aslam | 10 | 11 | 11 | 11

Round of 16
5/8 | (Egypt) Saadeld. Abouaish | 11 | 11 | 12
(Finland) Miko Äijänen | 7 | 6 | 10
Quarter finals
5/8 | (Egypt) Saadeld. Abouaish | 6 | 11 | 11 | 15
2 | (Pakistan) Tayyab Aslam | 11 | 8 | 5 | 13
(Japan) Ryunosuke Tsukue | 5 | 9 | 6
2 | (Pakistan) Tayyab Aslam | 11 | 11 | 11

== See also ==
- 2015 Women's World Junior Squash Championships
- British Junior Open Squash
- World Junior Squash Championships

| Preceded by Namibia (Windhoek); 2013 | Squash World Junior; Netherlands (Eindhoven); 2015 | Succeeded by Men's World Junior; 2016 |
