= Adrien Grondin =

French squash player (born 1996)

Personal information
- Born: 6 October 1996 (age 29) Saint-Pierre, Reunion Island, France
- Height: 1.70 m (5 ft 7 in)
- Weight: 66 kg (146 lb)

Sport
- Country: France
- Turned pro: 2017
- Retired: Active
- Racquet used: Black Knight

men's singles
- Highest ranking: 318 (February 2016)
- Current ranking: 433 (March 2021)
- Updated on 29 March 2021

Adrien Grondin (born 6 October 1996) is a French professional squash player. He competed at the 2015 Men's World Junior Squash Championships. He achieved his highest career PSA ranking of 318 in February 2016 during the 2015–16 PSA World Tour.
