= 2023 Men's World Junior Squash Championships =

Men's World Junior 2023
- WSF Men's World Junior Championship
- Location: (Australia) Melbourne
- Website www.wsfworldjuniors.com

Results
- Champion: (Pakistan) Hamza Khan

The 2023 Men's World Junior Squash Championships was held in Melbourne, Australia. The event took place from 18 to 29 July 2023.

== Details ==
Ultimately, the triumphant individuals were Hamza Khan from Pakistan. Khan displayed remarkable resilience, securing Pakistan's first WSF World Junior Squash championship since Jansher Khan's win in 1986. Amina Orfi from Egypt successfully defended her title from 2022 and clinched the women's championship.

The tournament saw a significant participation with 245 entries from 33 national federations. Additionally, the men's defending champion, Rowan Damming, who made history as the first Dutchman to win a World Junior Championship last year, returned as the No. 2 seed.
