= 2022 Women's British Open Squash Championship =

British Open
- Women's British Open

Details
- Event name: 2022 Allam British Open
- Location: Hull, England
- Venue: University of Hull Sports Complex
- Dates: 28 March to 3 April 2022

Women's Winner
- Prize money: $180,000
- Year: 2021–22 PSA World Tour

The Women's 2022 Allam British Open was the women's edition of the 2022 British Open Squash Championships, which is a 2021–22 PSA World Tour event. The event took place at the Sports Complex at the University of Hull in Hull in England between 28 March and 3 April 2022. The event was sponsored by Dr Assem Allam.

Hania El Hammamy defeated Nouran Gohar in an all Egyptian final.

== Seeds ==
1. (Egypt) Nouran Gohar (runner-up)
2. (Egypt) Hania El Hammamy (champion)
3. (United States) Amanda Sobhy (semi-finals)
4. (England) Sarah-Jane Perry (quarter-finals)
5. (New Zealand) Joelle King (semi-finals)
6. (Egypt) Salma Hany (second round)
7. (Egypt) Rowan Elaraby (third round)
8. (Egypt) Nour El Tayeb (quarter-finals)

== Draw and results ==
=== Semi-finals and final ===
Semi-finals
2	(Egypt) Hania El Hammamy	11	5	7	11	11
5	(New Zealand) Joelle King	5	11	11	8	3
3	(United States) Amanda Sobhy	2	3	5
1	(Egypt) Nouran Gohar	11	11	11

Final
2	(Egypt) El Hammamy	11	11	8	11
1	(Egypt) Gohar	9	7	11	4

=== Main Draw ===
==== Top half ====
First round
2	(Egypt) Hania El Hammamy
[Bye]
(Switzerland) Cindy Merlo	13	9	10	11	8
(Egypt) Zeina Mickawy	11	11	12	9	3
(United States) Olivia Clyne
[Bye]
(England) Georgina Kennedy
[Bye]
(Belgium) Tinne Gilis	11	11	11
(Czech Republic) Anna Serme	6	2	4
(Netherlands) Milou van der Heijden	5	11	11	11
(Malaysia) Rachael Grinham	11	9	6	7
(India) Joshna Chinappa
[Bye]
6	(Egypt) Salma Hany
[Bye]
5	(New Zealand) Joelle King
[Bye]
(Egypt) Sana Ibrahim	8	11	3
(England) Lucy Turmel	11	13	11
(Canada) Danielle Letourneau	9	6	11	11	11
(England) Katie Malliff	11	11	4	9	8
(Spain) Cristina Gómez	5	5	5
(Egypt) Nada Abbas	11	11	11
(Egypt) Farida Mohamed	11	11	11
(Latvia) Ineta Mackevica	4	4	3
(Canada) Hollie Naughton
[Bye]
(Scotland) Lisa Aitken	11	11	11
(England) Millie Tomlinson	7	5	1
[Bye]
4	(England) Sarah-Jane Perry

Second round
2	(Egypt) El Hammamy	11	11	11
(Switzerland) Merlo	3	7	5
(United States) Clyne	11	4	5	2
(England) Kennedy	6	11	11	11
(Belgium) Gilis	11	11	11
(Netherlands) Heijden	6	8	6
(India) Chinappa	2	15	9	11	11
6	(Egypt) Hany	11	13	11	5	6
5	(New Zealand) King	11	11	15
(England) Turmel	8	8	13
(Canada) Letourneau	4	8	10
(Egypt) Abbas	11	11	12
(Egypt) Mohamed	11	4	11	11
(Canada) Naughton	8	11	9	8
(Scotland) Aitken	6	10	5
4	(England) Perry	11	12	11

Third round
2	(Egypt) El Hammamy	11	11	5	11
(England) Kennedy	9	6	11	7
(Belgium) Gilis	12	11	11
(India) Chinappa	10	8	8
5	(New Zealand) King	11	11	11
(Egypt) Abbas	3	3	7
(Egypt) Mohamed	6	6	8
4	(England) Perry	11	11	11

Quarter-finals
2	(Egypt) El Hammamy	11	11	11
(Belgium) Gilis	4	3	5
Semi-finals
2	(Egypt) El Hammamy	11	5	7	11	11
5	(New Zealand) King	5	11	11	8	3
5	(New Zealand) King	12	11	11
4	(England) Perry	10	9	5

==== Bottom half ====
First round
3	(United States) Amanda Sobhy
[Bye]
(Hong Kong) Liu Tsz Ling	7	9	8
(Wales) Emily Whitlock	11	11	11
(Egypt) Mariam Metwally	11	9	7
(South Africa) Alexandra Fuller	13	11	11
(Finland) Emilia Soini	5	1	7
(England) Jasmine Hutton	11	11	11
(United States) Olivia Fiechter
[Bye]
(Wales) Tesni Evans
[Bye]
(Egypt) Hana Ramadan	11	11	11
(United States) Haley Mendez	5	3	4
[Bye]
7	(Egypt) Rowan Elaraby
8	(Egypt) Nour El Tayeb
[Bye]
(Egypt) Nadine Shahin
[Bye]
(Belgium) Nele Gilis
[Bye]
(Malaysia) Rachel Arnold	11	11	11
(Australia) Donna Lobban	5	6	9
(United States) Sabrina Sobhy	9	11	11	9	11
(Egypt) Yathreb Adel	11	5	9	11	3
(Hong Kong) Ho Tze-Lok	11	4	12	4
(Malaysia) Aifa Azman	9	11	14	8
(Malaysia) Sivasangari Subramaniam	11	11	11
(France) Enora Villard	4	1	7
[Bye]
1	(Egypt) Nouran Gohar

Second round
3	(United States) Sobhy	11	11	11
(Wales) Whitlock	2	5	4
(South Africa) Fuller	6	4	4
(England) Hutton	11	11	11
(United States) Fiechter	3	6	11	11	11
(Wales) Evans	11	11	6	3	4
(Egypt) Ramadan	11	12	8	7
7	(Egypt) Elaraby	5	14	11	11
8	(Egypt) El Tayeb	11	11	11
(Egypt) Shahin	9	5	7
(Belgium) Gilis	11	11	11
(Malaysia) Arnold	1	4	2
(United States) Sobhy	11	11	11
(Malaysia) Azman	6	8	6
(Malaysia) Subramaniam	3	11	5	7
1	(Egypt) Gohar	11	7	11	11

Third round
3	(United States) Sobhy	11	11	11
(England) Hutton	9	7	8
(United States) Fiechter	12	11	11
7	(Egypt) Elaraby	10	7	9
8	(Egypt) El Tayeb	12	11	11
(Belgium) Gilis	10	9	8
(United States) Sobhy	3	10	4
1	(Egypt) Gohar	11	12	11

Quarter-finals
3	(United States) Sobhy	11	11	11
(United States) Fiechter	6	7	8
Semi-finals
3	(United States) Sobhy	2	3	5
1	(Egypt) Gohar	11	11	11
8	(Egypt) El Tayeb	4	8	11	9
1	(Egypt) Gohar	11	11	5	11

== See also ==
- 2022 Men's British Open Squash Championship
