= Hamza Khan =

Pakistani squash player

Personal information
- Full name: Muhammad Hamza Khan
- Born: 2 November 2005 (age 20) Peshawar, Pakistan
- Height: 1.7 m (5 ft 7 in)
- Weight: 65 kg (143 lb)

Sport
- Country: Pakistan
- Turned pro: 2016
- Coached by: Niaz Ullah Khan

Men's singles
- Highest ranking: 100 (August 2025)
- Current ranking: 102 (October 2025)
- Title: 1
- Tour final: 3
- PSA Profile
Medal record
Men's squash
Representing Pakistan
World Junior Championships
| Gold medal – first place | 2023 Melbourne | Singles |

Muhammad Hamza Khan (born 2 November 2005) is a Pakistani squash player. He is the 2023 World Junior Squash Champion.

== Early life ==
Hamza belongs to Peshawar, Khyber Pakhtunkhwa, Pakistan. His maternal uncle Shahid Zaman is well known squash player who was formerly ranked World No. 14. The former world champion Qamar Zaman is also a close relative.

== Career ==
After winning the title Chief of Air Staff U-11 squash championship in 2016, Hamza was invited by the Pakistan Squash Federation to register as a trainee. At the start of his international career, he won the U-15 British Junior Open Squash championship in 2020. The following year, he came out on top in the 2021 U-19 US Junior Open squash championship. He secured a bronze medal at the 2022 Men's World Junior Squash Championships.

However, the highlight of his young career arrived in July 2023, when Hamza won the World Junior Squash Championship held in Melbourne, Australia. He defeated Muhammad Zakaria of Egypt by a score of 3-1 in the final. He is the first Pakistani to win the championship since Jansher Khan's accomplishment in 1986.

In June 2024, Hamza won the Boys’ Under-19 title at the 31st Asian Junior Squash Championship in Islamabad, downing Malaysia’s third seed Harith Danial in straight sets 11-5, 12-10, 11-9.

In May 2025, Khan won his first PSA title after securing victory in the Golden Open during the 2024–25 PSA Squash Tour.
