= Sandeep Ramachandran =

Indian squash player (born 1997)

Personal information
- Born: 13 January 1997 (age 29) Bahrain

Sport
- Country: India
- Turned pro: 2014
- Coached by: Maqbool Khawaja
- Retired: Active

Men's singles
- Highest ranking: No. 153 (April 2017)
- Current ranking: No. 158 (May 2022)
- Updated on May 2022

Sandeep Ramachandran (born 13 January 1997) is an Indian professional squash player. As of January 2022, he was ranked number 165 in the world. He won the 2021 MST Dubai Squash Series.
