= Daniel Poleshchuk =

Israeli squash player (born 1996)

Daniel Poleshchuk דניאל פולשצ'וק
Personal information
- Born: 11 February 1996 (age 30) Ramat-Gan, Israel
- Height: 1.69 m (5 ft 7 in)
- Weight: 65 kg (143 lb)

Sport
- Country: Israel
- Turned pro: 2013
- Coached by: Jonah Barrington /Alex Poleshchuk
- Racquet used: Tecnifibre

Men's singles
- Highest ranking: No. 66 (December 2023)
- Current ranking: No. 66 (December 2023)
- Title: 7
- Tour final: 9
- Updated on January 2024

Daniel Poleshchuk (Hebrew: דניאל פולשצ'וק; born 11 February 1996) is an Israeli professional squash player who represents Israel. He reached a career-high world ranking of World No. 66 in December 2023.

== Early and personal life ==
Poleshchuk was born in and now lives in Ramat Gan, Israel. He is Jewish. At the age of 13, he moved to England, to study on scholarship in Millfield School where he was coached by Jonah Barrington and Ian Thomas for five years.

== Squash career ==
Poleshchuk won a gold medal in Men's Open Squash at the 2013 Maccabiah Games, 2017 Maccabiah Games, and the 2022 Maccabiah Games. Also, he is a six-time Israeli Men's National Champion.

In February 2015 at the age of 19, Poleshchuk won his first Professional Squash Association (PSA) title, which made him the first Israeli squash player in history to achieve that. Later on that year, he won his second PSA title in London, England.
