= Lyell Fuller =

English squash player (born 1996)

Personal information
- Nickname: Lylo
- Born: 22 October 1995 (age 30) Exeter, England
- Height: 6 ft 2 in (1.88 m)

Sport
- Country: England
- Coached by: Jonny Harford
- Racquet used: Tecnifibre

Men's singles
- Highest ranking: No. 88 (March 2018)
- Current ranking: No. 117 (June 2018)
- Updated on January, 2019

Lyell Fuller (born October 22, 1996, in Exeter) is a professional squash player who represents England. He reached a career-high world ranking of World No. 88 in March 2018.
