= Dylan Murray (squash player) =

American squash player (born 1995)

Personal information
- Born: April 29, 1995 (age 31) New York City, New York
- Height: 1.829 m (6 ft 0 in)
- Weight: 81 kg (179 lb)

Sport
- Country: United States
- Racquet used: Harrow

Men's singles
- Highest ranking: No. 369 (February, 2012)
- Current ranking: No.440
- Updated on June, 2013

Dylan Murray (born April 29, 1995 in New York City) is a professional squash player who represents the United States. He reached a career-high world ranking of World No. 369 in February 2012.
