= World Squash Junior Championships =

Junior squash world championships

Details
- Event name: World Junior Championships
- Website wsfworldjuniors.com

Winners
- Men's: (Egypt) Mohamed Zakaria
- Women's: (India) Anahat Singh

The World Squash Junior Championships is the junior world championship of squash conducted by World Squash. Players aged under 19 can participate. The event used to be hosted biennially but has been held annually since 2009.

== Men's individual ==
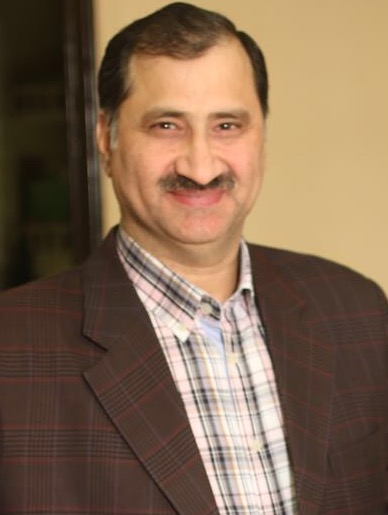
Jansher Khan won the World Junior individual title in Brisbane in 1986. Making him the only player in the history of squash who was also the World Open Champion during the same year.

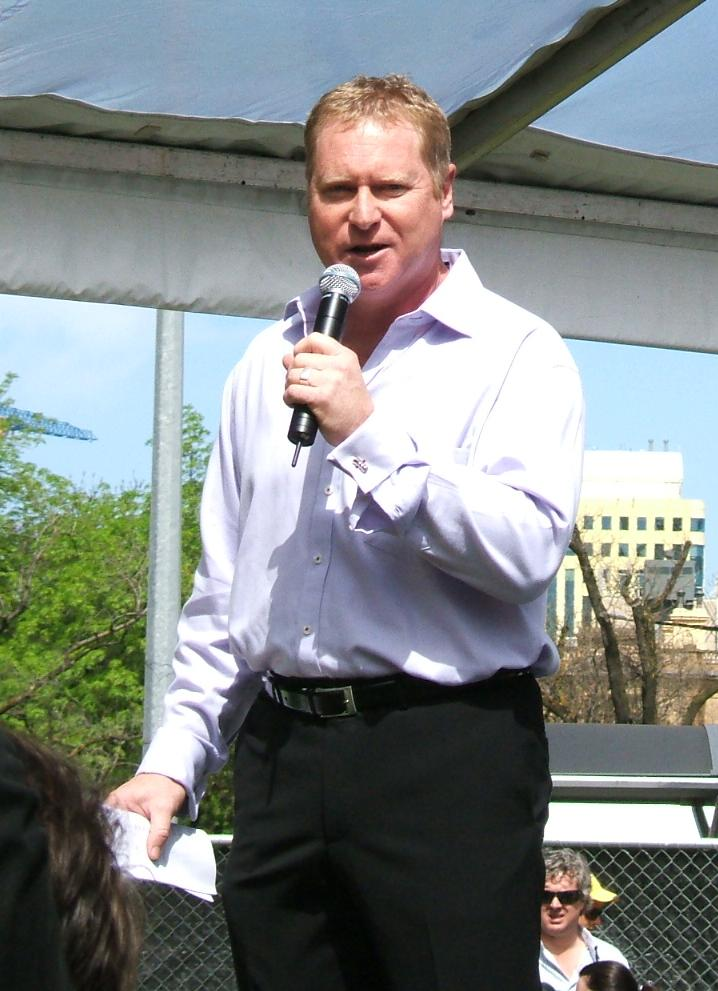
Chris Dittmar was the runner-up for the individual championship in 1980 and 1982.

Year	Venue	Champion	Runner-up	Scoreline
1980	(Sweden) Kungälv	(Australia) Peter Nance	(Australia) Chris Dittmar	6–9, 9–7, 9–2, 9–6
1982	(Malaysia) Kuala Lumpur	(Pakistan) Sohail Qaiser	(Australia) Chris Dittmar	3–9, 10–8, 9–4, 9–3
1984	(Canada) Calgary	(Australia) Chris Robertson	(England) David Lloyd	9–0, 9–5, 9–0
1986	(Australia) Brisbane	(Pakistan) Jansher Khan	(Australia) Rodney Eyles	9–3, 9–0, 9–2
1988	(Netherlands) Edinburgh	(England) Del Harris	(Australia) Anthony Hill	9–6, 5–9, 7–9, 9–7, 9–2
1990	(Germany) Paderborn	(England) Simon Parke	(England) David Campion	9–7, 9–4, 9–1
1992	Hong Kong	(Finland) Juha Raumolin	(Canada) Jonathon Power	5–9, 9–3, 9–7, 9–2
1994	(New Zealand) Christchurch	(Egypt) Ahmed Barada	(Egypt) Omar El Borolossy	9–0, 7–9, 3–9, 9–3, 9–2
1996	(Egypt) Cairo	(Egypt) Ahmed Faizy	(Australia) Stewart Boswell	9–6, 3–9, 9–7, 9–6
1998	(United States) Princeton	(Malaysia) Ong Beng Hee	(Egypt) Wael El Hindi	7–9, 9–5, 9–0, 9–5
2000	(Italy) Milan	(Egypt) Karim Darwish	(France) Grégory Gaultier	9–1, 9–3, 9–7
2002	(India) Chennai	(England) James Willstrop	(England) Peter Barker	9–0, 9–3, 9–1
2004	(Pakistan) Islamabad	(Egypt) Ramy Ashour	(Pakistan) Yasir Butt	9–5, 10–8, 9–3
2006	(New Zealand) Palmerston North	(Egypt) Ramy Ashour	(Egypt) Omar Mosaad	9–1, 9–3, 9–1
2008	(Switzerland) Zürich	(Egypt) Mohamed El Shorbagy	(Pakistan) Aamir Atlas Khan	2–9, 9–3, 10–8, 9–4
2009	(India) Chennai	(Egypt) Mohamed El Shorbagy	(Malaysia) Ivan Yuen	11–9, 12–10, 11–2
2010	(Ecuador) Quito	(Egypt) Amr Khaled Khalifa	(Egypt) Ali Farag	8–11, 11–9, 12–10, 11–7
2011	(Belgium) Herentals	(Egypt) Marwan El Shorbagy	(Egypt) Mohamed Abouelghar	11–6, 11–6, 11–8
2012	(Qatar) Doha	(Egypt) Marwan El Shorbagy	(Egypt) Mohamed Abouelghar	11–9, 7–11, 11–7, 11–8
2013	(Poland) Wrocław	(Egypt) Karim El Hammamy	(Egypt) Fares Dessouky	11–8, 11–6, 6–11, 13–11
2014	(Namibia) Windhoek	(Peru) Diego Elías	(Egypt) Omar El Atmas	11–3, 11–2, 11–1
2015	(Netherlands) Eindhoven	(Peru) Diego Elías	(Egypt) Youssef Soliman	11–6, 11–9, 11–8
2016	(Poland) Bielsko-Biała	(Malaysia) Eain Yow Ng	(Egypt) Saadeldin Abouaish	11–3, 9–11 11–7, 11–5
2017	(New Zealand) Tauranga	(Egypt) Marwan Tarek	(France) Victor Crouin	11–9, 3–11, 11–6, 3–11, 11–2
2018	(India) Chennai	(Egypt) Mostafa Asal	(Egypt) Marwan Tarek	11–7, 13–11, 11–4
2019	(Malaysia) Kuala Lumpur	(Egypt) Mostafa Asal	(Egypt) Moustafa El Sirty	12–10, 11–3, 11–6
2020	(Australia) Gold Coast	Cancelled due to COVID-19 pandemic in Australia.		
2022	(France) Maxéville	(Netherlands) Rowan Damming	(England) Finnlay Withington	11–4, 12–10, 11–8
2023	(Australia) Melbourne	(Pakistan) Hamza Khan	(Egypt) Mohamed Zakaria	10–12, 14–12, 11–3, 11–6
2024	(United States) Houston	(Egypt) Mohamed Zakaria	(South Korea) Na Joo-young	11–6, 11–4, 11–6
2025	(Egypt) New Cairo	(Egypt) Mohamed Zakaria	(Egypt) Marwan Assal	11–5, 11–3, 11–4
2026	(Canada) Niagara	(Egypt) Mohamed Zakaria	(Egypt) Adam Hawal	11–4, 12–10, 11–4

== Women's individual ==
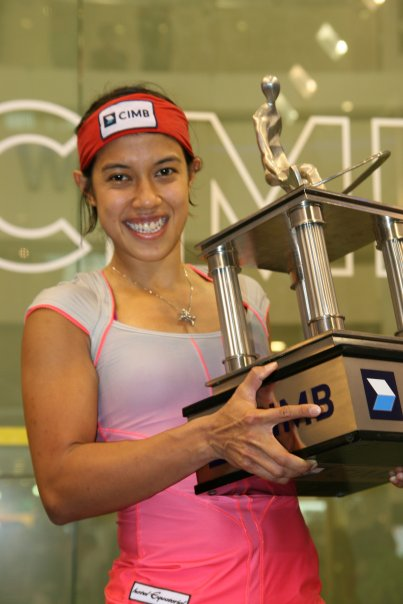
Nicol David is the first squash player to have won the individual World Junior title twice (1999 and 2001).

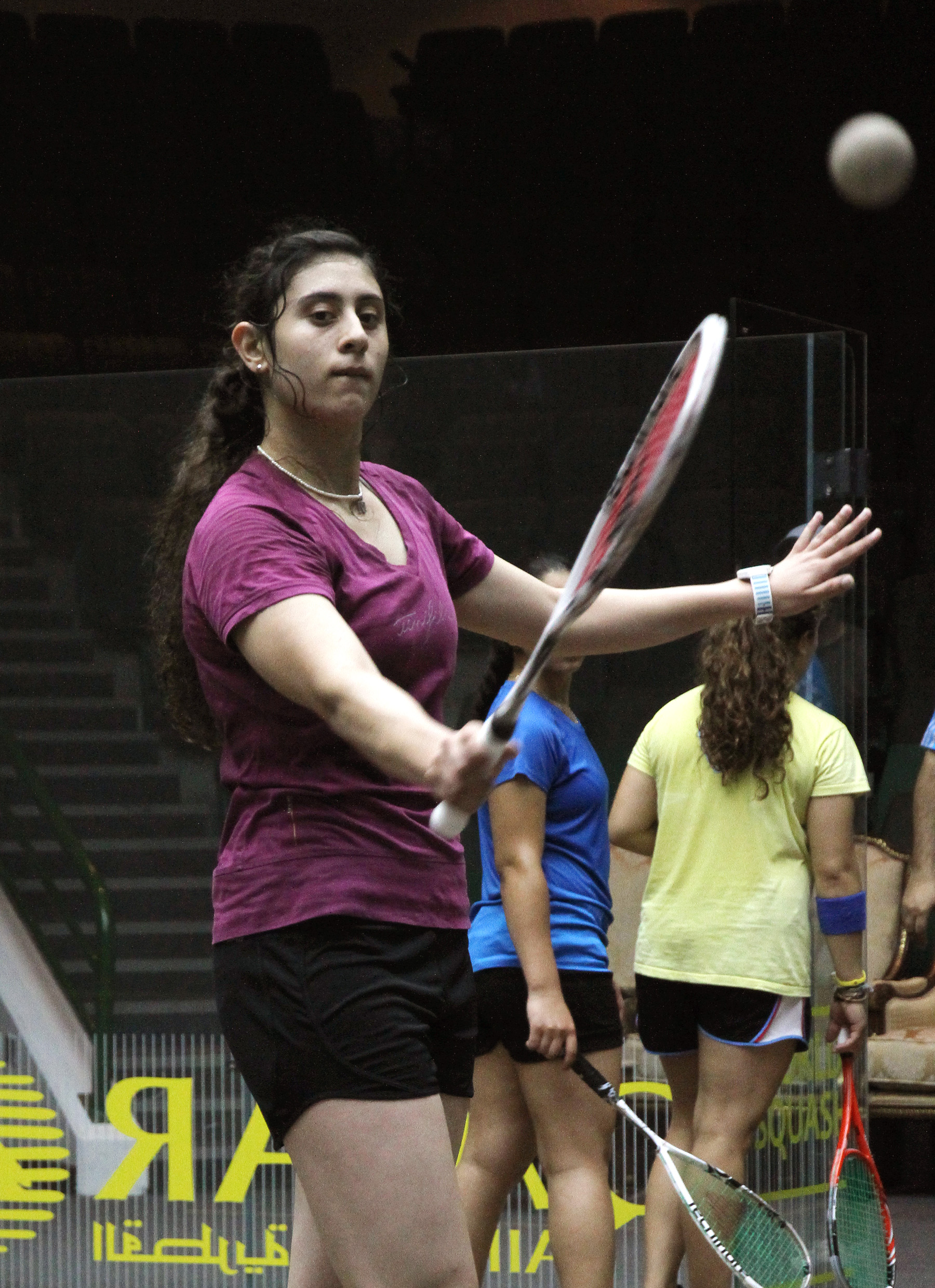
Nour El Sherbini became the youngest world junior champion at the age of 13.

The women's individual championship is the WSA Junior Tier 1 tournament and players who compete in the tournament are awarded ranking points for the official "Rising Stars" rankings.

Year	Venue	Champion	Runner-up	Scoreline
1981	(Canada) Ottawa	(England) Lisa Opie	(England) Martine Le Moignan	9–4, 9–6, 10–8
1983	(Australia) Perth	(Australia) Robyn Friday	(Australia) Helen Paradeiser	10–8, 9–2, 9–3
1985	(Republic of Ireland) Dublin	(England) Lucy Soutter	(Australia) Sarah Fitz-Gerald	9–1, 9–1, 9–6
1987	(England) Brighton	(Australia) Sarah Fitz-Gerald	(England) Donna Vardy	9–0, 9–6, 9–0
1989	(New Zealand) Hamilton	(England) Donna Vardy	(New Zealand) Lynora Hati	9–2, 9–1, 9–3
1991	(Norway) Bergen	(England) Cassie Jackman	(Germany) Sabine Schöne	9–1, 4–9, 9–6, 6–9, 9–0
1993	(Malaysia) Kuala Lumpur	(Australia) Rachael Grinham	(New Zealand) Sarah Cook	9–6, 5–9, 9–5, 9–1
1995	(Australia) Sydney	(New Zealand) Jade Wilson	(Australia) Rachael Grinham	9–3, 9–4, 9–7
1997	(Brazil) Rio de Janeiro	(England) Tania Bailey	(France) Isabelle Stoehr	9–6, 9–1, 9–7
1999	(Belgium) Antwerp	(Malaysia) Nicol David	(Malaysia) Leong Siu Lynn	9–5, 9–3, 9–2
2001	(Malaysia) Penang	(Malaysia) Nicol David	(Egypt) Omneya Abdel Kawy	9–2, 9–4, 9–2
2003	(Egypt) Cairo	(Egypt) Omneya Abdel Kawy	(Egypt) Amnah El Trabolsy	9–0, 9–6, 9–4
2005	(Belgium) Herentals	(Egypt) Raneem El Weleily	(India) Joshna Chinappa	9–3, 9–4, 10–8
2007	Hong Kong	(Egypt) Raneem El Weleily	(France) Camille Serme	9–2, 9–4, 5–9, 9–3
2009	(India) Chennai	(Egypt) Nour El Sherbini	(Egypt) Nour El Tayeb	5–11, 11–7, 11–6, 11–5
2010	(Germany) Cologne	(United States) Amanda Sobhy	(Egypt) Nour El Tayeb	3–11, 11–7, 11–6, 11–7
2011	(United States) Boston	(Egypt) Nour El Tayeb	(Egypt) Nour El Sherbini	11–5, 3–11, 11–7, 11–8
2012	(Qatar) Doha	(Egypt) Nour El Sherbini	(Egypt) Yathreb Adel	10–12, 11–9, 11–5, 11–2
2013	(Poland) Wrocław	(Egypt) Nour El Sherbini	(Egypt) Mariam Metwally	11–7, 16–14, 11–8
2014	(Namibia) Windhoek	(Egypt) Habiba Mohamed	(Egypt) Nouran Gohar	6–11, 11–2, 11–7, 11–6
2015	(Netherlands) Eindhoven	(Egypt) Nouran Gohar	(Egypt) Habiba Mohamed	11–6, 7–11, 11–7, 17–15
2016	(Poland) Bielsko-Biała	(Egypt) Nouran Gohar	(Egypt) Rowan Elaraby	11–5, 11–6, 11–7
2017	(New Zealand) Tauranga	(Egypt) Rowan Elaraby	(Egypt) Hania El Hammamy	11–7, 11–9, 11–8
2018	(India) Chennai	(Egypt) Rowan Elaraby	(Egypt) Hania El Hammamy	11–4, 11–9, 10–12, 11–9
2019	(Malaysia) Kuala Lumpur	(Egypt) Hania El Hammamy	(Egypt) Jana Shiha	11–9, 11–6, 11–8
2020	(Australia) Gold Coast	Cancelled due to COVID-19 pandemic in Australia.		
2022	(France) Maxéville	(Egypt) Amina Orfi	(Egypt) Salma El Tayeb	9–11, 1–11, 11–6, 11–3, 11–7
2023	(Australia) Melbourne	(Egypt) Amina Orfi	(Malaysia) Aira Azman	11–8, 11–5, 11–1
2024	(United States) Houston	(Egypt) Amina Orfi	(Egypt) Fayrouz Aboelkheir	11–7, 15–13, 11–5
2025	(Egypt) New Cairo	(Egypt) Amina Orfi	(Egypt) Nadien Elhammamy	11–7, 11–5, 11–5
2026	(Canada) Niagara	(India) Anahat Singh	(Egypt) Ruqayya Salem	11–3, 11–7, 11–9

== Statistics ==
=== Men ===
16	Egypt

3	England

3	Pakistan

2	Australia

2	Malaysia

2	Peru

1	Finland
1	Netherlands

=== Women ===
17	Egypt

5	England

3	Australia

2	Malaysia

1	New Zealand

1	United States

1	India

== See also ==
- World Junior Squash Circuit
- World Squash Team Championships
- World Squash Championships
- British Junior Open Squash

== Notes ==
- ^{a} The men's team event was held unofficially from 1973 to 1979.
