= Ollie Holland =

English squash player (born 1994)

Personal information
- Born: 19 June 1994 (age 32) Nottingham, England
- Height: 1.82 m (6 ft 0 in)
- Weight: 80 kg (180 lb)

Sport
- Country: England
- Turned pro: 2010
- Retired: Active
- Racquet used: Karakal

Men's singles
- Highest ranking: No. 127 (May 2013)
- Current ranking: (June 2013)
- Updated on June 2013

Ollie Holland (born 19 June 1994 in Nottingham) is a professional squash player who represents England. He reached a career-high world ranking of World No. 127 in May 2013.
