= Yousif Nizar Saleh =

Kuwaiti squash player (born 1994)

Personal information
- Born: November 7, 1994 (age 31) Kuwait City
- Height: 1.78 m (5 ft 10 in)
- Weight: 78 kg (172 lb)

Sport
- Country: Kuwait
- Turned pro: 2012
- Coached by: Iman Khan & Majed Khan
- Retired: Active

Men's singles
- Highest ranking: No. 110 (March 2014)
- Current ranking: No. 110
- Updated on March 2014

Yousif Nizar Saleh (born November 7, 1994, in Kuwait City) is a professional squash player who represents Kuwait. He reached a career-high world ranking of World No. 110 in March 2014.
