= Syed Hamzah Shah Bukhari =

Pakistani squash player (born 1993)

Personal information
- Born: December 31, 1993 (age 32) Lahore, Pakistan
- Height: 1.78 m (5 ft 10 in)
- Weight: 67 kg (148 lb)

Sport
- Country: Pakistan
- Turned pro: 2010
- Coached by: Abdul Rashid / Fahim Gul
- Retired: Active
- Racquet used: Dunlop

Men's singles
- Highest ranking: No. 2000 (June, 2013)
- Current ranking: No. 158 (June, 2013)
- Updated on June, 2013

Syed Hamzah Shah Bukhari (born December 31, 1993, in Lahore) is a professional squash player who represented Pakistan. He reached a career-high world ranking of World No. 158 in June 2013.
