= George Parker (squash player) =

English squash player (born 1996)

Personal information
- Born: 25 April 1996 (age 30) Leicester, England
- Height: 6 ft 1 in (1.85 m)
- Weight: 83 kg (183 lb)

Sport
- Country: England
- Handedness: Right Handed
- Turned pro: 2013
- Coached by: Robert Owen / Matt Williams
- Retired: Active
- Racquet used: Unsquashable

Men's singles
- Highest ranking: No. 25 (October 2022)
- Current ranking: No. 52 (December 2025)
- Title: 8
Medal record
Men's squash
Representing England
European Team Championships
Gold medal – first place	2022 Eindhoven	Team

George Parker (born 25 April 1996) is a professional squash player who represents England. He reached a career high ranking of 25 in the world during October 2022.

== Biography ==
Parker made his professional debut in 2012 whilst finishing his junior career that culminated in him winning the Under-19 European Championships in 2015, defeating Edmon Lopez Moller of Spain in the final.

Parker first joined the PSA Tour in 2015 and won the Barcelona Open just six months later, this triumph saw him break into the world's top 100 rankings for the first time. In 2016, his fiery temperament resulted in a warning for breaking a racquet during a match in frustration and the Professional Squash Association (PSA) later handed George a six-month suspension.

After the imposed break, he made it back into the top 100 at the end of the 2016-17 season. He went on to win seven professional titles and during 2018 continued his progression by reaching the world's top 50.

Parker won a gold medals for the England men's national squash team at the 2022 European Squash Team Championships held in Eindhoven. and later that year in October 2022, he hit a career best world ranking (at the time) of 25.

In December 2025, Parker won his 8th PSA title after securing victory in the London Open during the 2025–26 PSA Squash Tour.
