= Mohamed El Gawarhy =

Egyptian squash player (born 1996)

Mohamed El-Gawarhy
Personal information
- Nickname: Momo
- Born: January 26, 1996 (age 30) Cairo, Egypt
- Height: 1.73 m (5 ft 8 in)
- Weight: 73 kg (161 lb)

Sport
- Country: Egypt
- Turned pro: 2014
- Coached by: Omar Abdelaziz
- Retired: 2016
- Racquet used: Tecnifibre

Men's singles
- Highest ranking: No. 108 (July, 2015)
- Updated on November, 2025

Mohamed El Gawarhy (born January 26, 1996) is a retired professional squash player who has represented Egypt. He reached seventh place at the World Junior Championship in Poland at 2013, fifth place at the World Junior Championship in Namibia at 2014, and first place at the World Junior Teams Championship in Namibia at 2014. He reached a career-high world ranking of World No. 108 in July 2015.
