= Syed Ali Mujtaba Shah Bokhari =

Pakistani squash player (born 1996)

Personal information
- Born: April 5, 1996 (age 30) Lahore, Pakistan
- Height: 1.78 m (5 ft 10 in)
- Weight: 75 kg (165 lb)

Sport
- Country: Pakistan
- Turned pro: 2012
- Coached by: Mohibullah Khan
- Retired: Active

Men's singles
- Highest ranking: No. 133 (April, 2013)
- Current ranking: No. 152 (August, 2014)
- Updated on August, 2014

Syed Ali Mujtaba Shah Bokhari (born April 5, 1996 in Lahore) is a professional squash player who represented Pakistan. He reached a career-high world ranking of World No. 133 in April 2013.
