= Karim El Hammamy =

Egyptian squash player (born 1995)

Personal information
- Full name: Karim Ayman El Hammamy
- Born: September 4, 1995 (age 30) Cairo, Egypt
- Height: 1.71 m (5 ft 7 in)
- Weight: 66 kg (146 lb)

Sport
- Country: Egypt
- Turned pro: 2011
- Retired: Active
- Racquet used: Prince

Men's singles
- Highest ranking: No. 40 (June 2025)
- Current ranking: No. 40 (14 July 2025)
- Updated on June 2025

Karim Ayman El Hammamy (born November 4, 1995, in Cairo) is a professional squash player who represents Egypt. He reached a career-high world ranking of World No. 55 in March, 2017.
