= 2013 Women's World Junior Squash Championships =

Women's World Junior 2013
- 19th WSF Women's World Junior Championship
- Location: Wrocław Poland
- Venue: Hasta La Vista Club
- Website hastalavista.pl/wjc-2013/strona-glowna-2?lang=en

Results
- Champion: (Egypt) Nour El Sherbini
- Runner-up: (Egypt) Mariam Ibrahim Metwally
- Semi-finalists: (Egypt) Y Adel / (Egypt) H Mohamed

The 2013 Women's World Junior Squash Championships is the women's edition of the 2013 World Junior Squash Championships, which serves as the individual world Junior championship for squash players. The event took place at the Hasta La Vista Club in Wrocław in Poland from 16 to 21 July 2013. Nour El Sherbini won her third World Junior Open title, defeating Mariam Ibrahim Metwally in the final.

== Seeds ==
1. [1*] (Egypt) Nour El Sherbini (champion)
2. [2*] (Egypt) Nouran Ahmed Gohar (quarterfinals)
3. [3/4*] (Egypt) Yathreb Adel (semifinals)
4. [3/4*] (United States) Sabrina Sobhy (quarterfinals)
5. [5/8*] (England) Victoria Temple-Murray (round of 16)
6. [5/8*] (Egypt) Salma Hany Ibrahim Ahmed (quarterfinals)
7. [5/8*] (Egypt) Mariam Ibrahim Metwally (final)
8. [5/8*] (Belgium) Nele Gilis (quarterfinals)
9. [9/12*] (Malaysia) Rachel Arnold (third round)
10. [9/12*] (Hong Kong) Ho Ka Po (round of 16)
11. [9/12*] (Malaysia) Vanessa Raj (third round)
12. [9/12*] (Egypt) Habiba Mohamed Ahmed Alymohmed (semifinals)
13. [13/16*] (Canada) Hollie Naughton (third round)
14. [13/16*] (Australia) Jessica Turnbull (third round)
15. [13/16*] (India) Lakshya Ragavendran (third round)
16. [13/16*] (England) Nada El Kalaawy (round of 16)

== Draw and results ==
=== Finals ===
Quarter finals
1 | (Egypt) Nour El Sherbini | 11 | 11 | 11
5/8 | (Egypt) Salma Hany Ahmed | 9 | 3 | 6
9/12 | (Egypt) Habiba Alymohmed | 11 | 11 | 11
3/4 | (United States) Sabrina Sobhy | 7 | 7 | 8
3/4 | (Egypt) Yathreb Adel | 11 | 11 | 11
5/8 | (Belgium) Nele Gilis | 4 | 5 | 1
5/8 | (Egypt) Mariam Ibrahim Metwally | 7 | 11 | 11 | 11 | 11
2 | (Egypt) Nouran Ahmed Gohar | 11 | 7 | 5 | 13 | 8

Semi finals
1 | (Egypt) Nour El Sherbini | 11 | 11 | 11
9/12 | (Egypt) Habiba Alymohmed | 8 | 8 | 9
3/4 | (Egypt) Yathreb Adel | 6 | 11 | 6 | 11
5/8 | (Egypt) Mariam Ibrahim Metwally | 11 | 9 | 11 | 13

Final
1 | (Egypt) Nour El Sherbini | 11 | 16 | 11
5/8 | (Egypt) Mariam Ibrahim Metwally | 7 | 14 | 8

=== Top half ===
==== Section 1 ====
First round
1 | (Egypt) Nour El Sherbini
(Poland) Julia Chudzicka | 3 | 5 | 5
(Belgium) Tinne Gilis | 11 | 11 | 11
(Colombia) Laura Casallas
17/32 | (Netherlands) Tessa Ter Sluis
17/32 | (Australia) Grace McErvale
(India) Sachika Ingale | 11 | 11 | 11
(New Zealand) Hayley Hughes | 6 | 3 | 7
(France) Oceane Wadoux | 10 | 11 | 7 | 9
(Guatemala) Winifer Bonilla | 12 | 6 | 11 | 11
13/16 | (Canada) Hollie Naughton
9/12 | (Hong Kong) Ho Ka Po
(United States) Reeham Sedky | 11 | 11 | 11
(Switzerland) Nadja Pfister | 7 | 2 | 4
(Czech Republic) Karolina Holinkova
17/32 | (India) Harshit Jawanda
17/32 | (England) Lucy Beecroft
(South Africa) Bianca Brown
(France) Laura Gamblin | 12 | 11 | 11
(Japan) Momoka Nakahira | 10 | 2 | 7
5/8 | (Egypt) Salma Hany Ahmed

Second round
1 | (Egypt) Nour El Sherbini | 11 | 11 | 11
(Belgium) Tinne Gilis | 7 | 8 | 3
(Colombia) Laura Casallas | 5 | 7 | 9
17/32 | (Netherlands) Tessa ter Sluis | 11 | 11 | 11
17/32 | (Australia) Grace McErvale | 8 | 6 | 5
(India) Sachika Ingale | 11 | 11 | 11
(Guatemala) Winifer Bonilla | 6 | 4 | 4
13/16 | (Canada) Hollie Naughton | 11 | 11 | 11
9/12 | (Hong Kong) Ho Ka Po | 15 | 11 | 11
(United States) Reeham Sedky | 13 | 5 | 8
(Czech Republic) Karolina Holinkova | 8 | 3 | 5
17/32 | (India) Harshit Jawanda | 11 | 11 | 11
17/32 | (England) Lucy Beecroft | 11 | 12 | 11
(South Africa) Bianca Brown | 3 | 10 | 5
(France) Laura Gamblin | 4 | 1 | 6
5/8 | (Egypt) Salma Hany Ahmed | 11 | 11 | 11

Third round
1 | (Egypt) Nour El Sherbini | 11 | 11 | 11
17/32 | (Netherlands) Tessa ter Sluis | 3 | 7 | 6
(India) Sachika Ingale | 13 | 4 | 11 | 0 | 11
13/16 | (Canada) Hollie Naughton | 11 | 11 | 9 | 11 | 4
9/12 | (Hong Kong) Ho Ka Po | 11 | 11 | 11 | 11
17/32 | (India) Harshit Jawanda | 13 | 8 | 1 | 8
17/32 | (England) Lucy Beecroft | 9 | 4 | 4
5/8 | (Egypt) Salma Hany Ahmed | 11 | 11 | 11

Round of 16
1 | (Egypt) Nour El Sherbini | 11 | 11 | 11
(India) Sachika Ingale | 1 | 3 | 1
Quarter finals
1 | (Egypt) Nour El Sherbini | 11 | 11 | 11
5/8 | (Egypt) Salma Hany Ahmed | 4 | 5 | 1
9/12 | (Hong Kong) Ho Ka Po | 2 | 5 | 8
5/8 | (Egypt) Salma Hany Ahmed | 11 | 11 | 11

==== Section 2 ====
First round
5/8 | (England) Vict. Temple-Murray
(Canada) Sophie Mehta | 11 | 11 | 11
(Poland) Aleksandra Surdziel | 0 | 3 | 1
(Czech Republic) Barbora Krejcova
17/32 | (Malaysia) Celine Yeap
17/32 | (Hong Kong) Ho Tze-Lok
(Malaysia) Teh Min Jie
(India) Adya Advani | 6 | 4 | 7
(United States) Katie Tutrone | 11 | 11 | 11
9/12 | (Egypt) Habiba Alymohmed
13/16 | (England) Nada El Kalaawy
(Canada) Dileas MacGowan | 11 | 11 | 8 | 11
(New Zealand) Abbie Palmer | 7 | 4 | 11 | 6
(Malaysia) Sue Ann Yong
17/32 | (France) Marie Stephan
17/32 | (Malta) Colette Sultana
(Colombia) María Paula Tovar
(Poland) Klaudia Borek | 2 | 2 | 2
(Australia) Natalie Newton | 11 | 11 | 11
3/4 | (United States) Sabrina Sobhy

Second round
5/8 | (England) Vict. Temple-Murray | 11 | 11 | 11
(Canada) Sophie Mehta | 9 | 4 | 4
(Czech Republic) Barbora Krejcova | 6 | 6 | 9
17/32 | (Malaysia) Celine Yeap | 11 | 11 | 11
17/32 | (Hong Kong) Ho Tze-Lok
(Malaysia) Teh Min Jie | wo
(United States) Katie Tutrone | 9 | 3 | 3
9/12 | (Egypt) Habiba Alymohmed | 11 | 11 | 11
13/16 | (England) Nada El Kalaawy | 11 | 11 | 11
(Canada) Dileas MacGowan | 0 | 1 | 8
(Malaysia) Sue Ann Yong | 4 | 8 | 12
17/32 | (France) Marie Stephan | 11 | 11 | 14
17/32 | (Malta) Colette Sultana | 11 | 11 | 8 | 11
(Colombia) María Paula Tovar | 2 | 3 | 11 | 6
(Australia) Natalie Newton | 4 | 6 | 5
3/4 | (United States) Sabrina Sobhy | 11 | 11 | 11

Third round
5/8 | (England) Vict. Temple-Murray | 11 | 11 | 11
17/32 | (Malaysia) Celine Yeap | 8 | 7 | 9
17/32 | (Hong Kong) Ho Tze-Lok | 6 | 7 | 5
9/12 | (Egypt) Habiba Alymohmed | 11 | 11 | 11
13/16 | (England) Nada El Kalaawy | 11 | 11 | 11
17/32 | (France) Marie Stephan | 3 | 9 | 5
17/32 | (Malta) Colette Sultana | 3 | 5 | 6
3/4 | (United States) Sabrina Sobhy | 11 | 11 | 11

Round of 16
5/8 | (England) Vict. Temple-Murray | 11 | 3 | 6
9/12 | (Egypt) Habiba Alymohmed | 13 | 11 | 11
Quarter finals
9/12 | (Egypt) Habiba Alymohmed | 11 | 11 | 11
3/4 | (United States) Sabrina Sobhy | 7 | 7 | 8
13/16 | (England) Nada El Kalaawy | 11 | 2 | 8 | 11
3/4 | (United States) Sabrina Sobhy | 7 | 11 | 11 | 13

=== Bottom half ===
==== Section 1 ====
First round
3/4 | (Egypt) Yathreb Adel
(Australia) Nicole Stoneham | 11 | 11 | 11
(Czech Republic) Dominika Kejikova | 6 | 2 | 6
(Canada) Chloe Chemtob
17/32 | (Hong Kong) Pansy Chan
17/32 | (England) Lily Taylor
(Colombia) Natalia Londoño
(France) Julie Rossignol | 6 | 11 | 5 | 4
(Malaysia) Sivas. Subramaniam | 11 | 8 | 11 | 11
13/16 | (India) Laksh. Ragavendran
9/12 | (Malaysia) Vanessa Raj
(India) Tanvi Khanna | 11 | 11 | 11
(Japan) Ayaka Shiraishi | 5 | 1 | 4
(South Africa) Makgooi Peloakgosi
17/32 | (England) Anna Kimberley
17/32 | (New Zealand) Eleanor Epke
(United States) Olivia Fiechter
(Canada) Alison Richmond | 5 | 6 | 11 | 12 | 11
(France) Lea van der Zwalmen | 11 | 11 | 6 | 10 | 1
5/8 | (Belgium) Nele Gilis

Second round
3/4 | (Egypt) Yathreb Adel | 11 | 11 | 11
(Australia) Nicole Stoneham | 2 | 2 | 5
(Canada) Chloe Chemtob | 6 | 11 | 9 | 3
17/32 | (Hong Kong) Pansy Chan | 11 | 6 | 11 | 11
17/32 | (England) Lily Taylor | 11 | 11 | 11
(Colombia) Natalia Londoño | 2 | 7 | 2
(Malaysia) Sivas. Subramaniam | 8 | 8 | 11 | 5
13/16 | (India) Laksh. Ragavendran | 11 | 11 | 5 | 11
9/12 | (Malaysia) Vanessa Raj | 11 | 11 | 11
(India) Tanvi Khanna | 5 | 2 | 2
(South Africa) Makgooi Peloakgosi | 5 | 4 | 4
17/32 | (England) Anna Kimberley | 11 | 11 | 11
17/32 | (New Zealand) Eleanor Epke | 11 | 11 | 4 | 2 | 7
(United States) Olivia Fiechter | 8 | 8 | 11 | 11 | 11
(Canada) Alison Richmond | 5 | 1 | 6
5/8 | (Belgium) Nele Gilis | 11 | 11 | 11

Third round
3/4 | (Egypt) Yathreb Adel | 11 | 11 | 13
17/32 | (Hong Kong) Pansy Chan | 4 | 6 | 11
17/32 | (England) Lily Taylor | 8 | 11 | 11 | 11
13/16 | (India) Laksh. Ragavendran | 11 | 6 | 7 | 5
9/12 | (Malaysia) Vanessa Raj | 11 | 12 | 8 | 2
17/32 | (England) Anna Kimberley | 5 | 14 | 11 | 11
(United States) Olivia Fiechter | 5 | 11 | 11 | 3 | 8
5/8 | (Belgium) Nele Gilis | 11 | 3 | 9 | 11 | 11

Round of 16
3/4 | (Egypt) Yathreb Adel | 11 | 11 | 6 | 11
17/32 | (England) Lily Taylor | 2 | 4 | 11 | 3
Quarter finals
3/4 | (Egypt) Yathreb Adel | 11 | 11 | 11
5/8 | (Belgium) Nele Gilis | 4 | 5 | 1
17/32 | (England) Anna Kimberley | 6 | 11 | 9 | 8
5/8 | (Belgium) Nele Gilis | 11 | 9 | 11 | 11

==== Section 2 ====
First round
5/8 | (Egypt) Mariam Metwally
(South Africa) Kacey-Leigh Dodd
(Poland) Iga Cierpial | wo
(Canada) Alyssa Mehta
17/32 | (Czech Republic) Kristyna Alexova
17/32 | (United States) Maria Elena Ubina
(Colombia) Laura Tovar
(Hong Kong) Choi Uen Shan | 11 | 11 | 11
(France) Elise Romba | 4 | 4 | 4
9/12 | (Malaysia) Rachel Arnold
13/16 | (Australia) Jessica Turnbull
(India) Urwashi Joshi | 6 | 11 | 10 | 11 | 9
(United States) Kayley Leonard | 11 | 8 | 12 | 8 | 11
(Poland) Natalia Ryfa | 6 | 4 | 9
(New Zealand) Rebecca Barnett | 11 | 11 | 11
17/32 | (Finland) Emilia Soini
17/32 | (South Africa) Megan Page
(Switzerland) Cindy Merlo
(Japan) Satomi Watanabe | 7 | 3 | 10
(England) Georgina Kennedy | 11 | 11 | 12
2 | (Egypt) Nouran Gohar

Second round
5/8 | (Egypt) Mariam Metwally | 11 | 11 | 11
(South Africa) Kacey-Leigh Dodd | 5 | 2 | 3
(Canada) Alyssa Mehta | 11 | 11 | 7 | 7 | 11
17/32 | (Czech Republic) Kristyna Alexova | 5 | 8 | 11 | 11 | 6
17/32 | (United States) Maria Elena Ubina | 11 | 11 | 11
(Colombia) Laura Tovar | 3 | 10 | 9
(Hong Kong) Choi Uen Shan | 5 | 13 | 3 | 12 | 9
9/12 | (Malaysia) Rachel Arnold | 11 | 11 | 11 | 10 | 11
13/16 | (Australia) Jessica Turnbull | 5 | 11 | 13 | 11
(United States) Kayley Leonard | 11 | 9 | 11 | 5
(New Zealand) Rebecca Barnett | 9 | 12 | 11 | 4 | 11
17/32 | (Finland) Emilia Soini | 11 | 10 | 4 | 11 | 6
17/32 | (South Africa) Megan Page | 8 | 7 | 8
(Switzerland) Cindy Merlo | 11 | 11 | 11
(England) Georgina Kennedy | 4 | 5 | 3
2 | (Egypt) Nouran Gohar | 11 | 11 | 11

Third round
5/8 | (Egypt) Mariam Metwally | 11 | 11 | 11
(Canada) Alyssa Mehta | 4 | 5 | 4
17/32 | (United States) Maria Elena Ubina | 9 | 6 | 11 | 11 | 11
9/12 | (Malaysia) Rachel Arnold | 11 | 11
13/16 | (Australia) Jessica Turnbull | 6 | 10 | 9
(New Zealand) Rebecca Barnett | 11 | 12 | 11
(Switzerland) Cindy Merlo | 6 | 4 | 3
2 | (Egypt) Nouran Gohar | 11 | 11 | 11

Round of 16
5/8 | (Egypt) Mariam Metwally | 11 | 11 | 11
17/32 | (United States) Maria Elena Ubina | 6 | 5 | 7
Quarter finals
5/8 | (Egypt) Mariam Metwally | 7 | 11 | 11 | 11 | 11
2 | (Egypt) Nouran Gohar | 11 | 7 | 5 | 13 | 8
(New Zealand) Rebecca Barnett | 3 | 2 | 3
2 | (Egypt) Nouran Gohar | 11 | 11 | 11

== See also ==
- 2013 Women's World Junior Team Squash Championships
- 2013 Men's World Junior Squash Championships
- British Junior Open Squash
- World Junior Squash Championships

| Preceded by Qatar (Doha); 2012 | Squash World Junior; Poland (Wrocław); 2014 | Succeeded by Namibia (Windhoek); 2014 |
