= 2012 Women's World Junior Squash Championships =

Women's World Junior 2012
- 18th WSF Women's World Junior Championship
- Location: Doha Qatar
- Venue: Aspire Academy squash club
- Website www.worldsquash.org/worldjuniors2012/

Results
- Champion: (Egypt) Nour El Sherbini
- Runner-up: (Egypt) Yathreb Adel
- Semi-finalists: (Egypt) M Metwally / (England) E Whitlock

The 2012 Women's World Junior Squash Championships is the women's edition of the 2012 World Junior Squash Championships, which serves as the individual world Junior championship for squash players. The event took place at the Khalifa International Tennis and Squash Complex in Doha in Qatar from 7 to 12 July 2012. Nour El Sherbini won her second World Junior Open title, defeating Yathreb Adel in the final.

== Seeds ==
1. [1*] (Egypt) Nour El Sherbini (champion)
2. [2*] (England) Emily Whitlock (semifinals)
3. [3/4*] (Egypt) Kanzy Emad El Defrawy (quarterfinals)
4. [3/4*] (Egypt) Yathreb Adel (final)
5. [5/8*] (India) Anaka Alankamony (quarterfinals)
6. [5/8*] (United States) Maria Elena Ubina (third round)
7. [5/8*] (Egypt) Mariam Ibrahim Metwally (semifinals)
8. [5/8*] (Egypt) Salma Hany Ibrahim Ahmed (quarterfinals)

== Draw and results ==
=== Finals ===
Quarter finals
1	(Egypt) Nour El Sherbini	11	11	11
9/12	(France) Melissa Alves	3	5	4
5/8	(Egypt) Mariam I. Metwally	11	12	11
3/4	(Egypt) Kanzy El Defrawy	6	10	5
3/4	(Egypt) Yathreb Adel	11	11	5	11
5/8	(India) Anaka Alankamony	4	8	11	9
5/8	(Egypt) Salma Hany I. Ahmed	7	8	11	5
2	(England) Emily Whitlock	11	11	4	11

Semi finals
1	(Egypt) Nour El Sherbini	11	8	11	11
5/8	(Egypt) Mariam I. Metwally	2	11	9	6
3/4	(Egypt) Yathreb Adel	11	13	11
2	(England) Emily Whitlock	8	11	7

Final
1	(Egypt) Nour El Sherbini	10	11	11	11
3/4	(Egypt) Yathreb Adel	12	9	5	2

=== Top half ===
==== Section 1 ====
First round
(France) Enora Villard	11	11	12	11
(Japan) Risa Sugimoto	6	5	10	5
(South Africa) Megan Page	11	3	3	11	10
(India) Harchit K. Jawanda	6	11	11	5	12
(Portugal) Camille Lanier	11	10	11	11
(Australia) Lakeesha Rarere	7	12	6	3

Second round
1	(Egypt) Nour El Sherbini	11	11	11
(France) Enora Villard	3	2	2
(Finland) Emilia Soini	11	11	7	12
13/16	(Belgium) Nele Gilis	6	4	11	10
9/12	(France) Melissa Alves	5	11	11	11
(India) Harchit K. Jawanda	11	9	6	9
(Portugal) Camille Lanier	9	6	6
5/8	(United States) Maria Elena Ubina	11	11	11

Third round
1	(Egypt) Nour El Sherbini	11	11	11
(Finland) Emilia Soini	3	7	2
9/12	(France) Melissa Alves	15	11	9	11
5/8	(United States) Maria Elena Ubina	13	8	11	7

Quarter finals
1	(Egypt) Nour El Sherbini	11	11	11
9/12	(France) Melissa Alves	3	5	4

==== Section 2 ====
First round
(Hong Kong) Chui Ka-Hei	11	11	9	12
(United States) Katie Tutrone	3	2	11	10
(France) Marie Stephan	8	12	11	11
(India) Sachika Ingale	11	10	8	5

Second round
5/8	(Egypt) Mariam I. Metwally	11	11	11
(Hong Kong) Chui Ka-Hei	4	4	8
(Colombia) Laura Viviana Perez	12	11	11	4	9
9/12	(India) Apar. Balamurukan	14	9	6	11	11
13/16	(England) Victoria Murray	11	8	11	5	11
(Germany) Caroline Sayegh	8	11	9	11	4
(France) Marie Stephan	1	3	3
3/4	(Egypt) Kanzy El Defrawy	11	11	11

Third round
5/8	(Egypt) Mariam I. Metwally	11	11	11
9/12	(India) Apar. Balamurukan	4	4	2
13/16	(England) Victoria Murray	4	4	5
3/4	(Egypt) Kanzy El Defrawy	11	11	11

Quarter finals
5/8	(Egypt) Mariam I. Metwally	11	12	11
3/4	(Egypt) Kanzy El Defrawy	6	10	5

=== Bottom half ===
==== Section 1 ====
First round
(United States) Olivia Fiechter
(Guatemala) Winifer Bonilla	wo
(France) Oxane Ah-Hu	11	11	5	15
(England) Hannah Williams	4	4	11	13

Second round
3/4	(Egypt) Yathreb Adel	11	11	11
(United States) Olivia Fiechter	6	6	4
(Hong Kong) Choi Uen Shan	11	11	11
13/16	(Australia) Jessica Turnbull	9	3	4
9/12	(Hong Kong) Ho Ka Po	11	13	11
(Japan) Satomi Watanabe	9	11	4
(France) Oxane Ah-Hu	3	2	1
5/8	(India) Anaka Alankamony	11	11	11

Third round
3/4	(Egypt) Yathreb Adel	11	11	11
(Hong Kong) Choi Uen Shan	5	4	7
9/12	(Hong Kong) Ho Ka Po	11	5	6	6
5/8	(India) Anaka Alankamony	8	11	11	11

Quarter finals
3/4	(Egypt) Yathreb Adel	11	11	5	11
5/8	(India) Anaka Alankamony	4	8	11	9

==== Section 2 ====
First round
(Netherlands) Nikki VD Heijden	5	4	7
(South Africa) Julie Lee	11	11	11
(India) Lak. Ragavendran
(United States) Reeham Sedky	wo
(Germany) Annika Wiese	3	6	7
(Colombia) Anna Porras	11	11	11

Second round
5/8	(Egypt) Salma Hany Ahmed	11	11	11
(South Africa) Julie Lee	2	5	5
(India) Lak. Ragavendran	6	1	11	11
9/12	(France) Julia Lecoq	11	11	8	13
13/16	(United States) Sabrina Sobhy	8	11	11	11
(Hong Kong) Pansy Chan Pui-Hei	11	8	8	6
(Colombia) Anna Porras	3	1	2
2	(England) Emily Whitlock	11	11	11

Third round
5/8	(Egypt) Salma Hany Ahmed	11	11	11
9/12	(France) Julia Lecoq	6	4	7
13/16	(United States) Sabrina Sobhy	3	6	4
2	(England) Emily Whitlock	11	11	11

Quarter finals
(Egypt) Salma Hany Ahmed	7	8	11	5
2	(England) Emily Whitlock	11	11	4	11

== See also ==
- Men's World Junior Squash Championships 2012
- British Junior Open Squash
- World Junior Squash Championships

Preceded by United States (Boston); 2011	Squash World Junior; Qatar (Doha); 2012	Succeeded by Poland (Wroclaw); 2013
