= 2015 Women's World Junior Squash Championships =

Women's World Junior 2015
- 23rd WSF Women's World Junior Championship
- Location: Eindhoven Netherlands
- Website www.wsfworldjuniors.com

Results
- Champion: (Egypt) Nouran Gohar
- Runner-up: (Egypt) Habiba Mohamed
- Semi-finalists: (Egypt) M Metwally / (Egypt) S Hany Ibrahim

The 2015 Women's World Junior Squash Championships is the women's edition of the 2015 World Junior Squash Championships, which serves as the individual world Junior championship for squash players. The event took place in Eindhoven in the Netherlands from 26 to 30 July 2015. Nouran Gohar won her first World Junior Open title, defeating Habiba Mohamed in the final.

== Seeds ==
1. [1*] (Egypt) Habiba Mohamed (final)
2. [2*] (Egypt) Nouran Gohar (champion)
3. [3/4*] (Egypt) Mariam Metwally (semifinals)
4. [3/4*] (Egypt) Salma Hany Ibrahim (semifinals)
5. [5/8*] (United States) Sabrina Sobhy (quarterfinals)
6. [5/8*] (England) Georgina Kennedy (quarterfinals)
7. [5/8*] (Belgium) Tinne Gilis (second round)
8. [5/8*] (Egypt) Hania El Hammamy (quarterfinals)
9. [9/12*] (Australia) Lakeesha Rarere (third round)
10. [9/12*] (England) Lucy Beecroft (round of 16)
11. [9/12*] (Hong Kong) Choi Uen Shan (quarterfinals)
12. [9/12*] (England) Amelia Henley (round of 16)
13. [13/16*] (United States) Reeham Sedky (round of 16)
14. [13/16*] (Egypt) Mayar Hany Abdelrahman (round of 16)
15. [13/16*] (Canada) Chloe Chemtob (second round)
16. [13/16*] (Australia) Eleanore Epke (round of 16)

== Draw and results ==
=== Finals ===
Quarter finals
1	(Egypt) Habiba Mohamed	11	11	11
5/8	(Egypt) Hania El Hammamy	2	6	9
5/8	(United States) Sabrina Sobhy	11	11	7	9	7
3/4	(Egypt) Salma Hany Ibrahim	9	7	11	11	11
3/4	(Egypt) Mariam Metwally	13	11	7	11
5/8	(England) Georgina Kennedy	11	3	11	4
9/12	(Hong Kong) Choi Uen Shan	4	10	4
2	(Egypt) Nouran Gohar	11	12	11

Semi finals
1	(Egypt) Habiba Mohamed	10	11	10	11	13
3/4	(Egypt) Salma Hany Ibrahim	12	8	12	6	11
3/4	(Egypt) Mariam Metwally	11	7	8	7
2	(Egypt) Nouran Gohar	5	11	11	11

Final
1	(Egypt) Habiba Mohamed	6	11	7	15
2	(Egypt) Nouran Gohar	11	7	11	17

=== Top half ===
==== Section 1 ====
First round
1	(Egypt) Habiba Mohamed
(Iran) Sogol Samoodi	wo
(Netherlands) Suzanne Peters
(France) Sarah Mekhalfi
(New Zealand) Kaitlyn Watts
(Colombia) Laura Tovar
(India) Sunayna Kuruvilla	12	13	7	11
(Australia) Victoria Leow	10	11	11	4
(United States) Eleonore Evans	4	4	13	11	8
(Hong Kong) Hiu Lam Lui	11	11	11	7	11
13/16	(Canada) Chloe Chemtob
9/12	(England) Lucy Beecroft
(Germany) Saskia Beinhard	11	11	11
(Netherlands) Daniek Krukkert	3	4	3
(Zimbabwe) Carley Barton	2	0	1
(United States) Casey Wong	11	11	11
(Switzerland) Céline Walser
(Finland) Riina Koskinen
(Czech Republic) Eliška Jirásková	11	11	12
(South Africa) Inge Coetzee	7	4	10
(Belgium) Kato Verwilt	3	3	1
(India) Jui Kalgutkar	11	11	11
5/8	(Egypt) Hania El Hammamy

Second round
1	(Egypt) Habiba Mohamed	11	11	11
(Netherlands) Suzanne Peters	2	2	5
(France) Sarah Mekhalfi	7	4	6
(New Zealand) Kaitlyn Watts	11	11	11
(Colombia) Laura Tovar	11	9	11	11
(India) Sunayna Kuruvilla	2	11	3	5
(Hong Kong) Hiu Lam Lui	8	12	4	11	11
13/16	(Canada) Chloe Chemtob	11	10	11	8	9
9/12	(England) Lucy Beecroft	6	11	11	11
(Germany) Saskia Beinhard	11	5	7	5
(United States) Casey Wong	9	11	11	11
(Switzerland) Céline Walser	11	6	8	7
(Finland) Riina Koskinen	11	11	11
(Czech Republic) Eliška Jirásková	7	6	9
(India) Jui Kalgutkar	0	4	6
5/8	(Egypt) Hania El Hammamy	11	11	11

Third round
1	(Egypt) Habiba Mohamed	11	11	11
(New Zealand) Kaitlyn Watts	2	4	2
(Colombia) Laura Tovar	8	2	11	11	11
(Hong Kong) Hiu Lam Lui	11	11	6	5	3
9/12	(England) Lucy Beecroft	11	11	10	11
(United States) Casey Wong	8	3	12	3
(Finland) Riina Koskinen	0	4	1
5/8	(Egypt) Hania El Hammamy	11	11	11

Round of 16
1	(Egypt) Habiba Mohamed	11	11	11
(Colombia) Laura Tovar	6	7	8
Quarter finals
1	(Egypt) Habiba Mohamed	11	11	11
5/8	(Egypt) Hania El Hammamy	2	6	9
9/12	(England) Lucy Beecroft	7	7	5
5/8	(Egypt) Hania El Hammamy	11	11	11

==== Section 2 ====
First round
5/8	(United States) Sabrina Sobhy
(Canada) Tara Shannon	8	11	11	11
(South Africa) Faith Sithole	11	5	3	3
(New Zealand) Lauren Clarke
(Malaysia) Zoe Foo Yuk Han
(Malaysia) Andrea Jia Qi Lee
(Finland) Henrietta Huuhka	11	6	6	5
(Australia) Samantha Calvert	6	11	11	11
(Wales) Elin Harlow
(Nigeria) Sunday Veronica	wo
9/12	(England) Amelia Henley
13/16	(Egypt) Mayar Hany
(New Zealand) Juee Bhide	11	6	11	8	6
(Canada) Madlen O'Connor	9	11	9	11	11
(Netherlands) Elena Wagenmans	4	11	8	6
(Mexico) Maria Fern. Rivera	11	7	11	11
(Switzerland) Cindy Merlo
(Hong Kong) Ka Wing Ho
(India) Adya Advani
(England) Lucy Turmel	11	11	11
(France) Élise Romba	5	3	2
3/4	(Egypt) Salma Hany

Second round
5/8	(United States) Sabrina Sobhy	11	11	11
(Canada) Tara Shannon	1	5	5
(New Zealand) Lauren Clarke	8	10	5
(Malaysia) Zoe Foo Yuk Han	11	11	11
(Malaysia) Andrea Jia Qi Lee	11	11	11
(Australia) Samantha Calvert	6	8	5
(Wales) Elin Harlow	11	5	6
9/12	(England) Amelia Henley	13	11	11
13/16	(Egypt) Mayar Hany	11	11	11
(Canada) Madlen O'Connor	2	8	9
(Mexico) Maria Fern. Rivera	12	4	7	11	8
(Switzerland) Cindy Merlo	10	11	11	9	11
(Hong Kong) Ka Wing Ho	11	11	11
(India) Adya Advani	6	8	0
(England) Lucy Turmel	6	11	7	2
3/4	(Egypt) Salma Hany	11	7	11	11

Third round
5/8	(United States) Sabrina Sobhy	11	12	9	5	11
(Malaysia) Zoe Foo Yuk Han	6	10	11	11	3
(Malaysia) Andrea Jia Qi Lee	7	11	12	15
9/12	(England) Amelia Henley	11	8	14	17
13/16	(Egypt) Mayar Hany	11	11	11
(Switzerland) Cindy Merlo	8	8	3
(Hong Kong) Ka Wing Ho	2	3	10
3/4	(Egypt) Salma Hany	11	11	12

Round of 16
5/8	(United States) Sabrina Sobhy	11	11	5	11
9/12	(England) Amelia Henley	6	7	11	2
Quarter finals
5/8	(United States) Sabrina Sobhy	11	11	7	9	7
3/4	(Egypt) Salma Hany	9	7	11	11	11
13/16	(Egypt) Mayar Hany	11	7	13	6	8
3/4	(Egypt) Salma Hany	4	11	11	11	11

=== Bottom half ===
==== Section 1 ====
First round
3/4	(Egypt) Mariam Metwally
(Zimbabwe) Shannon O'Donovan	4	4	2
(Switzerland) Sarah Lüdin	11	11	11
(South Africa) Mariska Wiese
(Iran) Ailee Nayeri
(India) Harshit Jawanda
(New Zealand) Nadia Hubbard	9	11	11	11
(Netherlands) Fleur Maas	11	7	2	8
(Canada) Grace Thomas	11	11	10	6	9
(France) Julie Rossignol	8	6	12	11	11
13/16	(United States) Reeham Sedky
9/12	(Australia) Lakeesha Rarere
(Colombia) Sara Vallejo	11	11	11
(Finland) Nea Falck	4	3	5
(France) Laura Paquemar	11	11	11
(Netherlands) Juliette Permentier	5	6	7
(Malaysia) Siva. Subramaniam
(Malaysia) Nazih. Hanis Abdul
(India) Nikita Joshi	11	11	11
(Sweden) Annika Engstrom	9	3	4
(Germany) Nele Hatschek	11	11	6	6	7
(Hong Kong) Nga Ching Cheng	9	9	11	11	11
5/8	(England) Georgina Kennedy

Second round
3/4	(Egypt) Mariam Metwally	11	11	11
(Switzerland) Sarah Lüdin	0	0	0
(South Africa) Mariska Wiese
(Iran) Ailee Nayeri	wo
(India) Harshit Jawanda	11	11	11
(New Zealand) Nadia Hubbard	8	1	7
(France) Julie Rossignol	0	5	3
13/16	(United States) Reeham Sedky	11	11	11
9/12	(Australia) Lakeesha Rarere	11	12	11
(Colombia) Sara Vallejo	1	10	4
(France) Laura Paquemar	7	9	5
(Malaysia) Siva. Subramaniam	11	11	11
(Malaysia) Nazih. Hanis Abdul	11	11	11
(India) Nikita Joshi	9	8	7
(Hong Kong) Nga Ching Cheng	2	2	6
5/8	(England) Georgina Kennedy	11	11	11

Third round
3/4	(Egypt) Mariam Metwally	11	11	11
(South Africa) Mariska Wiese	3	4	6
(India) Harshit Jawanda	5	3	4
13/16	(United States) Reeham Sedky	11	11	11
9/12	(Australia) Lakeesha Rarere	12	12	9	11	9
(Malaysia) Siva. Subramaniam	14	10	11	7	11
(Malaysia) Nazihah Hanis Abdul	7	3	4
5/8	(England) Georgina Kennedy	11	11	11

Round of 16
3	(Egypt) Mariam Metwally	11	18	11	11
13/16	(United States) Reeham Sedky	13	16	8	7
Quarter finals
3/4	(Egypt) Mariam Metwally	13	11	7	11
5/8	(England) Georgina Kennedy	11	3	11	4
(Malaysia) Siva. Subramaniam	7	9	7
5/8	(England) Georgina Kennedy	11	11	11

==== Section 2 ====
First round
5/8	(Belgium) Tinne Gilis
(United States) Kayley Leonard
(England) Kace Bartley	wo
(Canada) Sophie Mehta	11	11	11	11
(Switzerland) Marija Shpakova	13	5	2	7
(Wales) Lowri Roberts
(New Zealand) Abbie Palmer
(Nigeria) Titiloayo Akinyele	wo
(Australia) Lauren Aspinall
(India) Akanksha Salunkhe	11	11	11
(Zimbabwe) Kuzivakw. Madungwe	0	0	0
9/12	(Hong Kong) Choi Uen Shan
13/16	(New Zealand) Eleanore Epke
(Finland) Maarit Ekholm	8	6	4
(Denmark) Chri. Christoffersen	11	11	11
(South Africa) Cassey Preece	3	2	10
(England) Mari Taylor	11	11	12
(Japan) Satomi Watanabe
(Netherlands) Sanne Veldkamp
(France) Laura Gamblin
(Australia) Rachael Gibson	7	6	8
(United States) Haley Scott	11	11	11
2	(Egypt) Nouran Gohar

Second round
5/8	(Belgium) Tinne Gilis	11	6	5	11	9
(United States) Kayley Leonard	9	11	11	7	11
(Canada) Sophie Mehta	13	11	11	11
(Wales) Lowri Roberts	15	6	2	5
(New Zealand) Abbie Palmer	11	11	11
(Australia) Lauren Aspinall	3	6	1
(India) Akanksha Salunkhe	4	11	2	6
9/12	(Hong Kong) Choi Uen Shan	11	9	11	11
13/16	(New Zealand) Eleanore Epke	11	11	11
(Denmark) Chris. Christoffersen	6	7	3
(England) Mari Taylor	7	9	5
(Japan) Satomi Watanabe	11	11	11
(Netherlands) Sanne Veldkamp	6	2	6
(France) Laura Gamblin	11	11	11
(United States) Haley Scott	4	2	3
2	(Egypt) Nouran Gohar	11	11	11

Third round
(United States) Kayley Leonard	5	11	11	11
(Canada) Sophie Mehta	11	3	4	7
(New Zealand) Abbie Palmer	2	5	10
9/12	(Hong Kong) Choi Uen Shan	11	11	12
13/16	(New Zealand) Eleanore Epke	11	14	16
(Japan) Satomi Watanabe	5	12	14
(France) Laura Gamblin	2	1	8
2	(Egypt) Nouran Gohar	11	11	11

Round of 16
(United States) Kayley Leonard	10	11	13	9	9
9/12	(Hong Kong) Choi Uen Shan	12	5	11	11	11
Quarter finals
9/12	(Hong Kong) Choi Uen Shan	4	10	4
2	(Egypt) Nouran Gohar	11	12	11
13/16	(New Zealand) Eleanore Epke	6	7	12	6
2	(Egypt) Nouran Gohar	11	11	10	11

== See also ==
- 2015 Men's World Junior Squash Championships
- 2015 Women's World Junior Team Squash Championships
- British Junior Open Squash
- World Junior Squash Championships

Preceded by Namibia (Windhoek); 2014	Squash World Junior; Netherlands (Eindhoven); 2015	Succeeded by World Junior; 2016
