= 2013 Women's World Junior Team Squash Championships =

Women's World Junior Team 2013
- 15th WSF Women's World Junior Team Championship
- Location: Wrocław Poland
- Venue: Hasta La Vista Club
- Website hastalavista.pl/wjc-2013/strona-glowna-2?lang=en

Results
- Champion: Egypt
- Runner-up: United States
- Third place: Hong Kong

The 2013 Women's World Junior Team Squash Championships was held in Wrocław, Poland. The event took place from 22 to 27 July 2013.

== Seeds ==
1. Egypt (Champion)
2. United States (Final)
3. England (Semifinals)
4. Hong Kong (Semifinals)
5. Malaysia (Quarterfinals)
6. India (Quarterfinals)
7. Canada (Quarterfinals)
8. New Zealand (Quarterfinals)

== Group stage results ==
=== Pool A ===
Egypt	3	-	0	Australia
New Zealand	3	-	0	Poland

Egypt	3	-	0	New Zealand
Australia	3	-	0	Poland

Egypt	3	-	0	Poland
New Zealand	2	-	1	Australia

Rank	Nation	Match	Win	Low	Points
1	Egypt	3	3	0	6
2	New Zealand	3	2	1	4
3	Australia	3	1	2	2
4	Poland	3	0	3	0

=== Pool B ===
United States	3	-	0	France
Canada	3	-	0	Czech Republic

United States	3	-	0	Canada
France	3	-	0	Czech Republic

United States	3	-	0	Czech Republic
Canada	3	-	0	France

Rank	Nation	Match	Win	Low	Points
1	United States	3	3	0	6
2	Canada	3	2	1	4
3	France	3	1	2	2
4	Czech Republic	3	0	3	0

=== Pool C ===
England	3	-	0	Japan
India	3	-	0	South Africa

England	3	-	0	India
Japan	1	-	2	South Africa

England	3	-	0	South Africa
India	3	-	0	Japan

Rank	Nation	Match	Win	Low	Points
1	England	3	3	0	6
2	India	3	2	1	4
3	South Africa	3	1	2	2
4	Japan	3	0	3	0

=== Pool D ===
Hong Kong	3	-	0	Colombia
Malaysia	3	-	0	Germany

Hong Kong	3	-	0	Malaysia
Colombia	1	-	2	Germany

Hong Kong	3	-	0	Germany
Malaysia	3	-	0	Colombia

Rank	Nation	Match	Win	Low	Points
1	Hong Kong	3	3	0	6
2	Malaysia	3	2	1	4
3	Germany	3	1	2	2
4	Colombia	3	0	3	0

== Finals ==
=== Draw ===
Quarterfinals
1	Egypt	3	3	2
7	Canada	0	0	0
6	India	0	0
4	Hong Kong	3	3
3	England	3	3
5	Malaysia	0	1
8	New Zealand	0	0	1
2	United States	3	3	2

Semifinals
1	Egypt	3	3
4	Hong Kong	0	1
3	England	2	3	0
2	United States	3	1	3

Final
1	Egypt	3	3
2	United States	0	0
Third place match
4	Hong Kong	3	3
3	England	2	2

=== Results ===
==== Semi-finals ====
Egypt

Semi-final
Wrocław, Poland
26 July 2013
All Glass Court

Hong Kong

			1	2	3	4	5
1	(Egypt) (Hong Kong)	N°1 Nour El Sherbini; N°1 Pansy Chan	11; 5	11; 5	11; 1
2	(Egypt) (Hong Kong)	N°2 Mariam Ibrahim Metwally; N°2 Ho Tze Lok	11; 5	11; 4	9; 11	12; 10
3	(Egypt) (Hong Kong)	N°3 Habiba Mohamed; N°3 Choi Uen Shan

England

Semi-final
Wrocław, Poland
26 July 2013
All Glass Court

United States

			1	2	3	4	5
1	(England) (United States)	N°1 Victoria Temple-Murray; N°1 Sabrina Sobhy	11; 6	11; 7	4; 11	8; 11	4; 11
2	(England) (United States)	N°2 Nada Elkalaawy; N°2 Olivia Fiechter	11; 8	10; 12	11; 7	11; 6
3	(England) (United States)	N°3 Lily Taylor; N°3 Reeham Sedky	7; 11	9; 11	6; 11

==== Final ====
Egypt

Final
Wrocław, Poland
27 July 2013
All Glass Court

United States

			1	2	3	4	5
1	(Egypt) (United States)	N°3 Habiba Mohamed; N°3 Reeham Sedky	11; 6	11; 2	11; 5
2	(Egypt) (United States)	N°1 Nour El Sherbini; N°1 Sabrina Sobhy	11; 5	11; 6	11; 3
3	(Egypt) (United States)	N°2 Mariam Ibrahim Metwally; N°2 Olivia Fiechter

== Post-tournament team ranking ==
Position	Team	Result
1st	Egypt	Champions
2nd	United States	Final
3rd	Hong Kong	Semi-final
4th	England	Semi-final
5th	Canada	Quarter-final
6th	Malaysia	Quarter-final
7th	India	Quarter-final
8th	New Zealand	Quarter-final

Position	Team	Result
9th	Japan	Group Stage
10th	France	Group Stage
11th	Australia	Group Stage
12th	Colombia	Group Stage
13th	Czech Republic	Group Stage
14th	South Africa	Group Stage
15th	Germany	Group Stage
16th	Poland	Group Stage

== See also ==
- 2013 Women's World Junior Squash Championships
- World Junior Squash Championships

Preceded by United States (Boston); 2011	Squash World Junior Team; Poland (Wrocław); 2013	Succeeded by Netherlands (Eindhoven); 2015
