= 2014 Women's World Junior Squash Championships =

Women's World Junior 2014
- 20th WSF Women's World Junior Championship
- Location: Windhoek Namibia
- Website www.wsfworldjuniors.com

Results
- Champion: (Egypt) Habiba Mohamed
- Runner-up: (Egypt) Nouran Ahmed Gohar
- Third place: (Egypt) Mariam Metwally

The 2014 Women's World Junior Squash Championships is the women's edition of the 2014 World Junior Squash Championships, which serves as the individual world Junior championship for squash players. The event took place in Windhoek in Namibia from 10 to 15 August 2014. Habiba Mohamed won her first World Junior Open title, defeating Nouran Ahmed Gohar in the final.

== Seeds ==
1. [1*] (Egypt) Nour El Sherbini (semifinals)
2. [2*] (Egypt) Nouran Ahmed Gohar (final)
3. [3/4*] (Egypt) Salma Hany Ibrahim Ahmed (quarterfinals)
4. [3/4*] (Egypt) Mariam Ibrahim Metwally (semifinals)
5. [5/8*] (Egypt) Habiba Mohamed Ahmed Alymohmed (champion)
6. [5/8*] (United States) Sabrina Sobhy (quarterfinals)
7. [5/8*] (France) Marie Stephan (round of 16)
8. [5/8*] (Belgium) Nele Gilis (round of 16)
9. [9/12*] (Belgium) Tinne Gilis (round of 16)
10. [9/12*] (United States) Olivia Fiechter (round of 16)
11. [9/12*] (England) Lily Taylor (quarterfinals)
12. [9/12*] (England) Georgina Kennedy (quarterfinals)
13. [13/16*] (United States) Reeham Sedky (round of 16)
14. [13/16*] (Colombia) Laura Tovar (second round)
15. [13/16*] (South Africa) Kacey-Leigh Dodd (round of 16)
16. [13/16*] (India) Harshit Jawanda (round of 16)

== Draw and results ==
=== Finals ===
Quarter finals
1	(Egypt) Nour El Sherbini	11	11	11
9/12	(England) Lily Taylor	2	3	3
5/8	(Egypt) Habiba Mohamed	12	11	11
3/4	(Egypt) Salma Hany Ibrahim	10	3	5
3/4	(Egypt) Mariam Ibrahim Metwally	11	11	11
9/12	(England) Georgina Kennedy	7	2	9
5/8	(United States) Sabrina Sobhy	9	4	8
2	(Egypt) Nouran Ahmed Gohar	11	11	11

Semi finals
1	(Egypt) Nour El Sherbini	11	11	10	8	11
5/8	(Egypt) Habiba Mohamed	8	5	12	11	13
3/4	(Egypt) Mariam Ibrahim Metwally	11	4	6	0
2	(Egypt) Nouran Ahmed Gohar	9	11	11	11

Final
5/8	(Egypt) Habiba Mohamed	6	11	11	11
2	(Egypt) Nouran Ahmed Gohar	11	2	7	6

=== Top half ===
==== Section 1 ====
First round
(England) Amelia Eliz. Henley	7	6	11	12	11
(United States) Casey Shey. Wong	11	11	6	10	7
(India) Anandita Gupta	w/o
(Namibia) Nhadia Mar. Gustavo
(Nigeria) Yemisi Olatunji	w/o
(Germany) Saskia Beinhard

Second round
1	(Egypt) Nour El Sherbini	11	11	11
(England) Amelia Eliz. Henley	4	5	2
(Malaysia) Andrea Jia Qi Lee	w/o
13/16	(South Africa) Kacey-Leigh Dodd	0	2	1
9/12	(England) Lily Taylor	11	11	11
(Namibia) Nhadia Maria Gustavo
(Germany) Saskia Beinhard	3	3	2
5/8	(France) Marie Stephan	11	11	11

Round of 16
1	(Egypt) Nour El Sherbini	11	11	11
13/16	(South Africa) Kacey-Leigh Dodd	4	2	1
9/12	(England) Lily Taylor	5	3	11	11	11
5/8	(France) Marie Stephan	11	11	8	4	5

Quarter finals
1	(Egypt) Nour El Sherbini	11	11	11
9/12	(England) Lily Taylor	2	3	3

==== Section 2 ====
First round
(Namibia) Lida-Marie Calizt	1	0	3
(Papua New Guinea) Lynette Vai	11	11	11
(Malaysia) Siva. Subramaniam
(Nigeria) Titiloayo Akinyele	w/o
(United States) Kayley Leonard	11	10	9	7
(England) Alison Thomson	4	12	11	11
(Sweden) L Grönlund-Bengsson
(Nigeria) Funke Okik. Oladunni	w/o

Second round
5/8	(Egypt) Habiba Mohamed	11	11	11
(Papua New Guinea) Lynette Vai	4	3	4
(Malaysia) Siva. Subramaniam	w/o
9/12	(Belgium) Tinne Gilis
13/16	(Colombia) Laura Tovar	9	9	10
(England) Alison Thomson	11	11	11
(Sweden) L. Grönlund-Bengsson	2	1	2
3/4	(Egypt) Salma Hany Ibrahim	11	11	11

Round of 16
5/8	(Egypt) Habiba Mohamed	11	11	11
9/12	(Belgium) Tinne Gilis	0	7	2
(England) Alison Thomson	6	9	4
3/4	(Egypt) Salma Hany Ibrahim	11	11	11

Quarter finals
5/8	(Egypt) Habiba Mohamed	12	11	11
3/4	(Egypt) Salma Hany Ibrahim	10	3	5

=== Bottom half ===
==== Section 1 ====
First round
(Colombia) Sara Vallejo	11	10	12	11
(South Africa) Makgosi Peloakgosi	6	12	10	9
(South Africa) Elsje Van Der Merwe	2	2	5
(Switzerland) Nadia Pfister	11	11	11
(Zimbabwe) Carley Kate Barton
(Nigeria) Sunday Veronica	w/o

Second round
3/4	(Egypt) Mariam Metwally	11	11	11
(Colombia) Sara Vallejo	2	2	3
(Malaysia) Zoe Foo Yuk Han	w/o
13/16	(United States) Reeham Sedky
9/12	(England) Georgina Kennedy	11	11	11
(Switzerland) Nadia Pfister	5	4	10
(Zimbabwe) Carley Kate Barton	0	0	0
5/8	(Belgium) Nele Gilis	11	11	11

Round of 16
3/4	(Egypt) Mariam Metwally	11	11	11
13/16	(United States) Reeham Sedky	3	5	8
9/12	(England) Georgina Kennedy	6	11	11	11
5/8	(Belgium) Nele Gilis	11	3	6	8

Quarter finals
3/4	(Egypt) Mariam Metwally	11	11	11
9/12	(England) Georgina Kennedy	7	2	9

==== Section 2 ====
First round
(Sweden) Linnea Wallsten	11	4	8	7
(Canada) Madlen Sh. O'Connor	7	11	11	11
(Germany) Nele Hatschek	11	11	11
(Namibia) Daniela Scriba	4	6	3
(Nigeria) Oludamn. Oluwafemi	11	15	9	11
(Namibia) Alyssa Cummings	7	13	11	2

Second round
5/8	(United States) Sabrina Sobhy	11	11	11
(Canada) Madlen Shea O'Connor	6	3	5
(Germany) Nele Hatschek	9	2	8
9/12	(United States) Olivia Fiechter	11	11	11
13/16	(India) Harshit Jawanda	11	11	11
(England) Jessica Davis	8	6	2
(Nigeria) Oludamnil. Oluwafemi	0	3	0
2	(Egypt) Nouran Gohar	11	11	11

Round of 16
5/8	(United States) Sabrina Sobhy	4	11	11	11
9/12	(United States) Olivia Fiechter	11	5	3	8
13/16	(India) Harshit Jawanda	2	7	0
2	(Egypt) Nouran Gohar	11	11	11

Quarter finals
5/8	(United States) Sabrina Sobhy	9	4	8
2	(Egypt) Nouran Gohar	11	11	11

== See also ==
- 2014 Men's World Junior Squash Championships
- British Junior Open Squash
- World Junior Squash Championships

Preceded by Poland (Wroclaw); 2013	Squash World Junior; Namibia (Windhoek); 2014	Succeeded by Netherlands (Eindhoven); 2015
