= 2022 Women's PSA World Tour Finals =

PSA World Tour Finals
- 4th Women's PSA World Tour Finals
- Location: Cairo, Egypt
- Venue: Mall of Arabia
- Date: 21–26 June 2022
- Website; Official website
- Prize money: $200,000

Results
- Champion: Nour El Sherbini (EGY)
- Runner-up: Nouran Gohar (EGY)
- Semi-finalists: Hania El Hammamy (EGY); Amanda Sobhy (USA)

The 2022 CIB Women's PSA World Series Finals is the fourth women's edition of the PSA World Tour Finals (Prize money : $200,000) after the renaming of PSA World Series. The top 8 players in the 2021–22 PSA World Tour are qualified for the event. The event takes place at Mall of Arabia, Cairo in Egypt from 21 to 26 June 2022.

It's the fourth edition under the PSA World Tour Finals label after the PSA renamed PSA World Series to current PSA World Tour Finals. CIB remains as the title sponsor.

== PSA World Ranking Points ==
PSA also awards points towards World Ranking. Points are awarded as follows:

PSA World Tour Finals		Ranking Points				
Rank	Prize money US$	Winner	Runner up	3/4	Round-Robin Match Win	Undefeated bonus
World Tour Finals	$200,000	1000	550	200	150	150

=== Match points distribution ===
Points towards the standings are awarded when the following scores:

Match score	Points
2–0 win	4 points
2–1 win	3 points
1–2 loss	1 point
0–2 loss	0 point

== Qualification & Seeds ==
=== Qualification ===
Top eight players at 2021–22 PSA World Tour standings qualifies to Finals.

World Championship
177.5	1st Round	290	2nd Round
475	3rd Round	780	Quarterfinalist
1270	Semifinalist	2090	Runner-up
**3175**	Winner		

Platinum
152.5	1st Round	250	2nd Round
410	3rd Round	675	Quarterfinalist
1100	Semifinalist	1810	Runner-up
**2750**	Winner		

Gold
160	1st Round	260	2nd Round
430	Quarterfinalist	700	Semifinalist
1150	Runner-up	**1750**	Winner

Silver
112.5	1st Round	182.5	2nd Round
300	Quarterfinalist	490	Semifinalist
805	Runner-up	**1225**	Winner

Bronze
80	1st Round	130	2nd Round
215	Quarterfinalist	350	Semifinalist
575	Runner-up	**875**	Winner

Top 16 Women's World Tour Standings 2021–22
Rank	Player	Tournaments Played	ENG (England)	GBR (United Kingdom)	EGY (Egypt)	USA (United States)	USA (United States)	USA (United States)	MYS (Malaysia)	EGY (Egypt)	USA (United States)	USA (United States)	USA (United States)	USA (United States)	EGY (Egypt)	GBR (United Kingdom)	ENG (England)	USA (United States)	USA (United States)	EGY (Egypt)	GBR (United Kingdom)	Total Points
1	(Egypt) **Nouran Gohar**	12	DNP	1810	**2750**	430	**2750**	**875**	DNP	700	DNP	**875**	DNP	**2750**	**2750**	1810	DNP	DNP	**1750**	2090	1810	23150
2	(Egypt) **Hania El Hammamy**	11	**1225**	1100	675	430	1810	DNP	DNP	1150	DNP	DNP	DNP	1810	410	**2750**	DNP	DNP	DNP	1270	**2750**	15380
3	(Egypt) **Nour El Sherbini**	9	DNP	**2750**	1810	DNP	1100	DNP	DNP	**1750**	DNP	DNP	**875**	1100	1810	DNP	DNP	DNP	DNP	**2750**	1100	15045
4	(United States) **Amanda Sobhy**	13	DNP	1100	1100	**1750**	410	DNP	DNP	DNP	DNP	215	DNP	675	675	1100	DNP	DNP	1150	780	250	9205
5	(New Zealand) **Joelle King**	12	DNP	675	DNP	700	675	215	DNP	260	DNP	DNP	575	1100	1100	1100	**1225**	DNP	DNP	475	675	8775
6	(England) **Sarah-Jane Perry**	13	805	675	250	700	675	DNP	DNP	260	575	130	DNP	DNP	675	675	805	DNP	DNP	780	675	7680
7	(Egypt) **Rowan Elaraby**	13	182.5	675	675	260	250	DNP	DNP	430	DNP	DNP	DNP	675	1100	410	DNP	**875**	430	780	250	6992.5
8	(England) **Georgina Kennedy**	12	DNP	152.5	DNP	DNP	410	575	DNP	700	**875**	350	DNP	675	675	410	300	DNP	DNP	475	410	6007.5
9	(Egypt) Salma Hany	12	DNP	250	675	1150	250	DNP	575	430	DNP	DNP	DNP	675	410	250	DNP	DNP	700	290	250	5905
10	(United States) Olivia Fiechter	13	DNP	250	250	260	1100	DNP	DNP	DNP	215	575	130	250	410	675	DNP	DNP	700	290	410	5515
11	(Belgium) Nele Gilis	14	300	250	410	DNP	675	215	DNP	260	DNP	215	215	410	410	410	490	DNP	DNP	475	410	5145
12	(Egypt) Nour El Tayeb	7	DNP	DNP	DNP	DNP	DNP	DNP	DNP	430	DNP	DNP	350	250	675	675	DNP	DNP	DNP	1270	1100	4750
13	(Egypt) Nadine Shahin	17	182.5	675	250	260	410	DNP	215	160	130	DNP	130	410	250	250	182.5	350	260	290	250	4655
14	(Belgium) Tinne Gilis	12	300	250	DNP	DNP	DNP	350	DNP	160	350	215	130	410	250	675	DNP	DNP	DNP	475	675	4240
15	(Wales) Tesni Evans	13	490	410	DNP	430	250	215	DNP	260	130	130	DNP	410	250	250	490	DNP	DNP	475	DNP	4190
16	(United States) Sabrina Sobhy	15	DNP	410	250	260	250	130	DNP	DNP	215	130	350	250	250	410	DNP	215	260	475	250	4105

Bold – Players qualified for the final
(*) – Winners of Platinum's tournaments automatically qualifies for Finals.

=== Seeds ===
1. (Egypt) Nouran Gohar
2. (Egypt) Nour El Sherbini
3. (Egypt) Hania El Hammamy
4. (United States) Amanda Sobhy
5. (New Zealand) Joelle King
6. (England) Sarah-Jane Perry
7. (Egypt) Rowan Elaraby
8. (England) Georgina Kennedy

== Group stage results ==
Times are Eastern European Time (UTC+02:00). To the best of three games.

=== Group A ===
Date	Time	Player 1	Player 2	Score
21 June	20:15	Joelle King (NZL)	Georgina Kennedy (ENG)	7–11, 11–5, 14–12
22 June	19:00	Nouran Gohar (EGY)	Amanda Sobhy (USA)	11–4, 11–5
23 June	19:00	Nouran Gohar (EGY)	Georgina Kennedy (ENG)	11–3, 11–4
23 June	20:15	Amanda Sobhy (USA)	Joelle King (NZL)	11–5, 11–5
24 June	19:00	Nouran Gohar (EGY)	Joelle King (NZL)	11–6, 11–1
24 June	20:15	Amanda Sobhy (USA)	Georgina Kennedy (ENG)	11–4, 11–4

==== Standings ====
Pos	Team	Pld	W	L	GF	GA	GD	Pts	Qualification
1	Nouran Gohar (EGY)	3	3	0	6	0	+6	12	Advancing to Semifinals
2	Amanda Sobhy (USA)	3	2	1	4	2	+2	8	Advancing to Semifinals
3	Joelle King (NZL)	3	1	2	2	5	−3	3	
4	Georgina Kennedy (ENG)	3	0	3	1	6	−5	1	

Source: PSA World Tour Finals

=== Group B ===
Date	Time	Player 1	Player 2	Score
21 June	19:00	Nour El Sherbini (EGY)	Sarah-Jane Perry (ENG)	11–6, 11–8
21 June	21:30	Hania El Hammamy (EGY)	Rowan Elaraby (EGY)	11–8, 8–11, 11–9
22 June	20:15	Nour El Sherbini (EGY)	Rowan Elaraby (EGY)	11–8, 11–7
22 June	21:30	Hania El Hammamy (EGY)	Sarah-Jane Perry (ENG)	16–14, 11–5
23 June	21:30	Nour El Sherbini (EGY)	Hania El Hammamy (EGY)	11–8, 4–11, 11–9
24 June	21:30	Sarah-Jane Perry (ENG)	Rowan Elaraby (EGY)	5–11, 11–8, 12–10

==== Standings ====
Pos	Team	Pld	W	L	GF	GA	GD	Pts	Qualification
1	Nour El Sherbini (EGY)	3	3	0	6	1	+5	11	Advancing to Semifinals
2	Hania El Hammamy (EGY)	3	2	1	5	3	+2	8	Advancing to Semifinals
3	Sarah-Jane Perry (ENG)	3	1	2	2	5	−3	3	
4	Rowan Elaraby (EGY)	3	0	3	2	6	−4	2	

Source: PSA World Tour Finals

== Knockout stage ==
Semi finals (25 June)
1	Nouran Gohar (EGY)	11	12
3	Hania El Hammamy (EGY)	9	10
2	Nour El Sherbini (EGY)	11	11
4	Amanda Sobhy (USA)	2	5

Final (26 June)
1	Nouran Gohar (EGY)	6	8	5
2	Nour El Sherbini (EGY)	11	11	11

=== Semifinal ===
To the best of three games.

Date	Time	Player 1	Player 2	Score
25 June	19:00	Nouran Gohar (EGY)	Hania El Hammamy (EGY)	11–9, 12–10
25 June	20:15	Nour El Sherbini (EGY)	Amanda Sobhy (USA)	11–2, 11–5

=== Final ===
To the best of five games.

Date	Time	Player 1	Player 2	Score
26 June	19:30	Nouran Gohar (EGY)	Nour El Sherbini (EGY)	11–6, 11–8, 11–5

2022 Women's PSA World Tour Finals winner
(Egypt)
Nour El Sherbini
Second title

== See also ==
- 2022 Men's PSA World Tour Finals
- 2021–22 PSA World Tour Finals
