= Hong Kong Junior Open Squash =

Hong Kong Junior Open

Details
- Event name: Hong Kong Junior Open
- Location: Hong Kong
- Venue: Hong Kong Squash Center
- Website www.hksquash.org.hk/inter_hkj_info.html

Men's Winner
- Most recent champion(s): (Japan) Tsukue Ryunosuke

Women's Winner
- Most recent champion(s): (Hong Kong) Choi Uen Shan

Hong Kong Junior Open squash championship is considered one of the most prestigious junior open squash championships in Asia and in the world. It is one of just four Tier 2 events used in the world junior rankings, which are surpassed in difficulty only by the World Junior Squash Championships. The tournament hosts nearly 500 players every year and is organized by the Asian Squash Federation and Hong Kong Squash.

Hong Kong Junior Open is divided into ten categories — Boys Under-19, Boys Under-17, Boys Under-15, Boys Under-13, Boys Under-11, Girls Under-19, Girls Under-17, Girls Under-15, Girls Under-13 and Girls Under-11.

== List of winners by category (Boys) ==
=== Prior to 1999 ===
Year	Under-19			
1968	(Malaysia) Balvinder Dillon			
1969	(Hong Kong) Tsang Chiang Chung			
1970	(Hong Kong) Tsang Chiang Chung			
1971	(Hong Kong) Michael Sandberg			
1972	(Hong Kong) Michael Sandberg			
1973	(Hong Kong) Miles Hancock			
1974	(Hong Kong) Nicholas Jeffery			
1975	(Hong Kong) Nicholas Jeffery			
1976	(Hong Kong) Nicholas Jeffery			
1977	(Hong Kong) Nicholas Jeffery			
1978	(Hong Kong) Donnie Choi			
1979	(Hong Kong) Jackie Choi			
1980	(Hong Kong) Victor Poon			
1981	(Hong Kong) Jackie Choi			
1982	(Hong Kong) Daniel Tully			
1983	(Malaysia) Dr Patrick Timothy Gurubatham		1984	(Malaysia) Dr Patrick Gurubatham
1985	(Malaysia) Dr Patrick Timothy Gurubatham			
1986	(Hong Kong) Tony Choi			
1987	(Pakistan) Farham Samiullah			
1988	(Pakistan) Farham Samiullah			
1989	(Pakistan) Jamil Ahmide			
1990	(Hong Kong) Yang Man Sum			
1991	(Hong Kong) Dick Leung			
1992	(Hong Kong) Jackie Lee			
1993	(Hong Kong) Jackie Lee			
1994	(Hong Kong) Jackie Lee Chun Kit			
1995	(Hong Kong) Jackie Lee Chun Kit			
1996	(Malaysia) Dr Patrick Timothy Gurubatham	1997	(Malaysia) Dr Patrick Gurubatham	
1998	(Hong Kong) Vincent Cheung Cheuk Yin			

=== After 1999 ===
Year	Under-11	Under-13	Under-15	Under-17	Under-19
1999	(Singapore) Marcus Phua	(Hong Kong) Anson Kwong	(Hong Kong) Dick Lau	(Malaysia) Kelvin Ho	(Malaysia) Mohd Azlan Iskandar
2000	(India) Vikram Molhotra	(Pakistan) Adhil Maqbool	(Hong Kong) Dick Lau	(Hong Kong) Patrick Choi	(India) Bikram Oberoi
2001	(Malaysia) Ivan Yuen	(Malaysia) Muhd Asyraf Azan	(Hong Kong) Anson Kwong	(South Korea) Park Jung Gye	(Hong Kong) Dick Lau
2002	(India) Ramit Tandon	(India) Vikram Malhotra	(Hong Kong) Max Lee	(South Korea) Lee Seung Jun	(Hong Kong) Dick Lau
2003	(Hong Kong) Wong King Yat	(Malaysia) Ivan Yuen	(India) Harinder Pal Sandhu	(Hong Kong) Anson Kwong	(Hong Kong) Dick Lau
2004	(India) Mahesh Mangaonkar	(Hong Kong) Ivan Fung Ngo	(Hong Kong) Leo Au	(Hong Kong) Max Lee	(Hong Kong) Dick Lau
2005	(India) Rishi Tandon	(Malaysia) Cheong Kah Wah	(Malaysia) Ivan Yuen	(Hong Kong) Leo Au	(Hong Kong) Anson Kwong
2006	(Hong Kong) Kevin Cheung	(Hong Kong) Tsz Fung Yip	(Hong Kong) Wong King Ngo	(Hong Kong) Leo Au	(Hong Kong) Max Lee
2007	(Malaysia) Mohd Syafiq Kamal	(Malaysia) Subramaniam Darren	(Hong Kong) Wong King Yat	(Hong Kong) Nelson Chan	(South Korea) Lee Nyeon Ho
2008	(Hong Kong) Ng Ka Yiu	(Hong Kong) Tse Man Ho	(Hong Kong) Tsz Fung Yip	(Hong Kong) Ivan Fung Ngo	(Hong Kong) Leo Au
2009	(Hong Kong) Chu Kwok Kee	(Hong Kong) Ng Eain Yow	(Hong Kong) Yeung Ho Wai	(Malaysia) Ismail Affeeq Abedeen	(Hong Kong) Nelson Chan
2010	(Pakistan) Hammas Ahmed Tarar	(Malaysia) Ng Eain Yow	(Hong Kong) Chris Lo	(Hong Kong) Tsz Fung Yip	(Malaysia) Mohd Zul Azri
2011	(Malaysia) Muhd Hafiz Zhafri	(Hong Kong) Chu Kwok Kee	(Hong Kong) Yuen Tsun	(India) Kush Kumar	(England) Ollie Holland
2012	(India) Fadte Yash	(Malaysia) Foo Kok Sheng Jesse	(Malaysia) Mohd Farez Izwan	(Malaysia) Mohd Syafiq Kamal	(Hong Kong) Tsz Fung Yip
2013	(India) Prabhu Navaneeth	(Malaysia) Gan Darryl	(Jordan) Mohammad Al-Saraj	(Hong Kong) Ling To Yu Andes	(Hong Kong) Yeung Ho Wai
2014	(Malaysia) Chuah Joachim	(India) Veer Chotrani	(India) Tushar Shahani	(Jordan) Mohammad Al-Saraj	(Hong Kong) Yuen Tsun Hei
2015	(Malaysia) Eain yow	(Hong Kong) Au Lap Man	(Egypt) Asal Mostafa	(Hong Kong) Law Yat Long Robinson	(Japan) Tsukue Ryunosuke

=== Boys' champions by country since 1999 ===
Country	U-11	U-13	U-15	U-17	U-19	Total
Hong Kong	4	7	11	10	11	43
Malaysia	4	7	2	3	2	18
India	6	2	2	1	1	12
South Korea	0	0	0	2	1	3
Jordan	1	0	1	1	0	3
Pakistan	1	2	0	0	0	3
England	0	0	0	0	1	1
Japan	0	0	0	0	1	1
Egypt	0	0	1	0	0	1
Singapore	1	0	0	0	0	1

== List of winners by category (Girls) ==
=== Prior to 1999 ===
Year	Under-19
1980	(Hong Kong) Jo Smith
1981	(Hong Kong) Dawn Olsen
1982	(Hong Kong) Dawn Olsen
1983	(Hong Kong) Dawn Olsen
1984	(Philippines) Cyrene Dela Rose
1985	(Singapore) Mah Li Lian
1986	(Singapore) Lina Ong
1987	(Singapore) Lina Ong
1988	(Australia) Nichole Portelli
1989	(Australia) Nichole Portelli
1990	(Philippines) Chris Bonoan
1991	(Hong Kong) Sally Hawkes
1992	(Hong Kong) Rebecca Chiu
1993	(Hong Kong) Rebecca Chiu
1994	(Hong Kong) Rebecca Chiu
1995	(Hong Kong) Rebecca Chiu
1996	(Hong Kong) Rebecca Chiu
1997	(Hong Kong) Rebecca Chiu
1998	(Malaysia) Tricia Chuah

=== After 1999 ===
Year	Under-11	Under-13	Under-15	Under-17	Under-19
1999	(India) Alisha Mashruwala	(Malaysia) Sally Looi	(Malaysia) Lim Yoke Wah	(Hong Kong) Karen Lau	(Australia) Kylie Doherty
2000	(Hong Kong) Anthea Yung	(Hong Kong) Ka Kei Chiu	(Hong Kong) So Tsz Lui	(Hong Kong) Karen Lau	(Hong Kong) Akanksha Hazari
2001	(India) Nikita Emanuel	(India) Alisha Mashruwala	(Hong Kong) Joey Chan	(Hong Kong) So Tsz Lui	(Hong Kong) Karen Lau
2002	(Hong Kong) Athena Chan	(Malaysia) Low Wee Wern	(Hong Kong) Ka Kei Chiu	(Hong Kong) Joey Chan	(Malaysia) Lim Yoke Wah
2003	(Hong Kong) Wong Hiu Kwan	(India) Anwesha Reddy	(Malaysia) Fatin Suhaimi	(Hong Kong) Annie Au	(Hong Kong) Joey Chan
2004	(India) Ankita Sharma	(Hong Kong) Carmen Lee	(Japan) Misaki Kobayashi	(Hong Kong) Leung Shin Nga	(Hong Kong) Annie Au
2005	(Hong Kong) Ho Ka Po	(Malaysia) Tan Yan Xi	(Malaysia) Rachel Goh	(Hong Kong) Leung Shin Nga	(Hong Kong) Joey Chan
2006	(Hong Kong) Ho Tze Lok	(Malaysia) Airin Abdul Rahma	(Hong Kong) Liu Tsz Ling	(South Korea) Song Sun Mi	(Hong Kong) Annie Au
2007	(Malaysia) Lee Jadeleen	(Hong Kong) Ho Ka Po	(Hong Kong) Tong Tsz Wing	(Hong Kong) Liu Tsz Ling	(Hong Kong) Annie Au
2008	(Malaysia) Zoe Foo	(Hong Kong) Ho Tze Lok	(Hong Kong) Ho Ka Po	(Hong Kong) Tong Tsz Wing	(South Korea) Song Sun Mi
2009	(Hong Kong) Ho Ka Wing	(Hong Kong) Choi Uen Shan	(Hong Kong) Ho Tze Lok	(Hong Kong) Lee Ka Yi	(Hong Kong) Tong Tsz Wing
2010	(Hong Kong) Cheng Nga Ching	(Malaysia) Sivasangari Subramaniam	(Malaysia) Ho Tze Lok	(Hong Kong) Lee Ka Yi	(Hong Kong) Tong Tsz Wing
2011	(Hong Kong) Lui Hiu Lam	(Japan) Satomi Watanabe	(Hong Kong) Choi Uen Shan	(Hong Kong) Pansy Chan	(Hong Kong) Lee Ka Yi
2012	(Malaysia) Azman Aifa Binti	(Hong Kong) Cheng Nga Ching	(Malaysia) Subramaniam Sivasangari	(Hong Kong) Pansy Chan	(Hong Kong) Ho Ka Po
2013	(Malaysia) Manoharan Kiroshanna	(Hong Kong) Lui Hiu Lam	(Japan) Watanabe Satomi	(Hong Kong) Choi Uen Shan	(Hong Kong) Ho Ka Po
2014	(Hong Kong) Wong Po Yui Kirstie	(Hong Kong) Lau Tin Yan	(Hong Kong) Lui Hiu Lam	(Malaysia) Lee Andrea Jia Qi	(Hong Kong) Ho Tze Lok
2015	(Malaysia) Azman Aira	(United States) Stefanoni Marina	(Hong Kong) Lui Hiu Lam	(Japan) Watanabe Satomi	(Hong Kong) Choi Uen Shan

=== Girls' champions by country since 1999 ===
Country	U-11	U-13	U-15	U-17	U-19	Total
Hong Kong	9	8	10	14	14	55
Malaysia	5	5	5	1	1	17
India	3	2	0	0	0	5
Japan	0	1	2	1	0	4
South Korea	0	0	0	1	1	2
Australia	0	0	0	0	1	1
United States	0	1	0	0	0	1

== See also ==
- Hong Kong Open
- World Junior Squash Circuit
- World Junior Squash Championships
- British Junior Open Squash
- Asian Squash Federation
- Hong Kong Squash
