= United States women's national junior squash team =

- Coach: Scott Devoy
- Association: U.S. Squash
- Colors: Red, Blue & White

Medal record

World Junior Team Championships
Silver medal – second place	2011 Boston	Team
Silver medal – second place	2013 Wrocław	Team
Silver medal – second place	2015 Eindhoven	Team
Silver medal – second place	2024 Houston	Team
Bronze medal – third place	2023 Melbourne	Team

The United States women's national junior squash team represents the United States in international squash junior team competitions, and is governed by U.S. Squash.

Since 1985, the United States won four silver medals of the best in World Junior Team Championships.

== Results ==
=== World Junior Squash Team Championships ===
Year	Result	Position	W	L
(Republic of Ireland) Dublin 1985	Group stage	9th		
(England) Brighton 1987	Group stage	11th		
(New Zealand) Hamilton 1989	Quarter-finals	8th		
(Norway) Bergen 1991	Quarter-finals	8th		
(Malaysia) Kuala Lumpur 1993	Group stage	13th		
(Australia) Sydney 1995	Quarter-finals	8th		
(Brazil) Rio de Janeiro 1997	Group stage	13th		
(Belgium) Antwerp 1999	Quarter-finals	5th		
(Malaysia) Penang 2001	Fourth place	4th		
(Egypt) Cairo 2003	Quarter-finals	8th		
(Belgium) Herentals 2005	Fourth place	4th		
Hong Kong 2007	Quarter-finals	8th		
(India) Chennai 2009	Fourth place	4th		
(United States) Boston 2011	Runner-up	2nd place, silver medalist(s)		
(Poland) Wrocław 2013	Runner-up	2nd place, silver medalist(s)	5	1
(Netherlands) Eindhoven 2015	Runner-up	2nd place, silver medalist(s)	5	1
(New Zealand) Tauranga 2017	Quarter-finals	5th	4	2
(Malaysia) Kuala Lumpur 2019	Quarter-finals	6th	4	3
(Australia) Melbourne 2023	Third place	3rd place, bronze medalist(s)	4	1
(United States) Houston 2024	Runner-up	2nd place, silver medalist(s)	5	1
Total	0 Title	20/20		
