= 2021–22 PSA World Tour Finals =

2021–22 PSA World Tour

Details
- Event name: 2021–22 PSA World Tour Finals
- Location: Cairo
- Venue: Mall of Arabia
- Website; PSA World Tour standings
- Year: 2021–22 PSA World Tour

The 2021–22 PSA World Tour is a series of men's and women's squash tournaments which are part of the Professional Squash Association (PSA) PSA World Tour from August 2021 until July 2022. The PSA World Tour tournaments are some of the most prestigious events on the men's and women's tour. The best-performing players in the World Tour events qualify for the annual Men's and Women's Finals.

Starting in August 2018, PSA replaced World Series tournaments with new PSA World Tour, comprising four new tournament-tiers: Platinum ($164,500–$180,500), Gold ($100,000–$120,500), Silver ($70,000–$88,000) and Bronze ($51,000–$53,000) each one awarding different points.

== PSA World Tour Ranking Points ==
PSA World Tour events also have a separate World Tour ranking. Points for this are calculated on a cumulative basis after each World Tour event. The top eight players at the end of the calendar year are then eligible to play in the PSA World Tour Finals.

Ranking points vary according to tournament tier being awarded as follows:

Tournament			Ranking Points
Rank	Prize Money US$	Ranking Points	Winner	Runner up	3/4	5/8	9/16	17/32	33/48
World Championship	$500,000	25045 points	3175	2090	1270	780	475	290	177.5
Platinum	$164,500–$180,500	19188 points	2750	1810	1100	675	410	250	152.5
Gold	$100,000–$120,500	10660 points	1750	1150	700	430	260	160
Silver	$75,000–$88,000	7470 points	1225	805	490	300	182.5	112.5
Bronze	$47,500–$55,000	5330 points	875	575	350	215	130	80

== Men's ==
=== Tournaments ===
Tournament	Country	Location	Rank	Prize money	Date	Winner
Manchester Open	England	Manchester	Silver	$85,000	9–13 August 2021	(Peru) Diego Elías
Allam British Open	England	Hull	Platinum	$175,000	16–22 August 2021	(New Zealand) Paul Coll
CIB Egyptian Squash Open	Egypt	Cairo	Platinum	$295,000	10–17 September 2021	(Egypt) Ali Farag
Oracle Netsuite Open	United States	San Francisco	Gold	$121,000	22–27 September 2021	(Egypt) Ali Farag
U.S. Open	United States	Philadelphia	Platinum	$165,500	1–8 October 2021	(Egypt) Mostafa Asal
Qatar Q-Terminals Classic	Qatar	Doha	Platinum	$187,500	17–23 October 2021	(Peru) Diego Elías
Canary Wharf Classic	England	London	Gold	$100,000	14–19 November 2021	(New Zealand) Paul Coll
Malaysian Open	Malaysia	Kuala Lumpur	Bronze	$50,000	23–27 November 2021	(India) Saurav Ghosal
Black Ball Squash Open	Egypt	New Cairo	Gold	$112,500	16–20 December 2021	(New Zealand) Paul Coll
Houston Open	United States	Houston	Gold	$110,000	4–9 January 2022	(Egypt) Ali Farag
Sturbridge Capital Motor City Open	United States	Bloomfield Hills	Silver	$80,000	26–30 January 2022	(Peru) Diego Elías
Squash on Fire Open	United States	Washington, D.C.	Bronze	$50,000	16–20 February 2022	(Egypt) Mohamed El Shorbagy
Windy City Open	United States	Chicago	Platinum	$250,000	23 Feb.–2 Mar. 2022	(New Zealand) Paul Coll
OptAsia Championships	England	London	Gold	$109,000	6–11 March 2022	(Egypt) Ali Farag
Canary Wharf Classic	England	London	Gold	$110,000	13–18 March 2022	(Egypt) Fares Dessouky
Karachi Open Squash Championships	Pakistan	Karachi	Bronze	$52,500	15–19 March 2022	(Egypt) Karim Abdel Gawad
Allam British Open	England	Hull	Platinum	$180,000	28 Mar.–3 Apr. 2022	(New Zealand) Paul Coll
Manchester Open	England	Manchester	Silver	$77,500	13–18 April 2022	(Wales) Joel Makin
J.P. Morgan Tournament of Champions	United States	New York City	Gold	$115,000	1–7 May 2022	(Egypt) Ali Farag
PSA World Championships	Egypt	Cairo	W.C.	$550,000	13–21 May 2022	(Egypt) Ali Farag
El Gouna International	Egypt	El Gouna	Platinum	$180,000	27 May.–3 Jun. 2022	(Egypt) Mostafa Asal
Necker Mauritius Open	Mauritius	Grand-Baie	Gold	$110,000	7–11 June 2022	(Peru) Diego Elías

=== Standings ===
World Championship
177.5	1st Round	290	2nd Round
475	3rd Round	780	Quarterfinalist
1270	Semifinalist	2090	Runner-up
**3175**	Winner		

Platinum
152.5	1st Round	250	2nd Round
410	3rd Round	675	Quarterfinalist
1100	Semifinalist	1810	Runner-up
**2750**	Winner		

Gold
160	1st Round	260	2nd Round
430	Quarterfinalist	700	Semifinalist
1150	Runner-up	**1750**	Winner

Silver
112.5	1st Round	182.5	2nd Round
300	Quarterfinalist	490	Semifinalist
805	Runner-up	**1225**	Winner

Bronze
80	1st Round	130	2nd Round
215	Quarterfinalist	350	Semifinalist
575	Runner-up	**875**	Winner

Top 16 Men's PSA World Tour Standings 2021–22
Rank	Player	Tournaments Played	ENG (England)	GBR (United Kingdom)	EGY (Egypt)	USA (United States)	USA (United States)	QAT (Qatar)	ENG (England)	MYS (Malaysia)	EGY (Egypt)	USA (United States)	USA (United States)	USA (United States)	USA (United States)	ENG (England)	ENG (England)	PAK (Pakistan)	GBR (United Kingdom)	ENG (England)	USA (United States)	EGY (Egypt)	EGY (Egypt)	MRI (Mauritius)	Total Points
1	(Egypt) **Ali Farag**	14	DNP	1810	**2750**	**1750**	675	DNP	1150	DNP	1150	**1750**	DNP	DNP	675	**1750**	DNP	DNP	1810	DNP	**1750**	**3175**	1100	DNP	21295
2	(New Zealand) **Paul Coll**	14	DNP	**2750**	1100	1150	675	1810	**1750**	DNP	**1750**	DNP	490	DNP	**2750**	DNP	260	DNP	**2750**	DNP	DNP	1270	1810	700	21015
3	(Peru) **Diego Elías**	14	**1225**	675	DNP	DNP	1100	**2750**	700	DNP	DNP	DNP	**1225**	DNP	250	1150	700	DNP	675	DNP	1150	780	675	**1750**	14805
4	(Egypt) **Mostafa Asal**	13	DNP	675	250	700	**2750**	1100	430	DNP	700	700	DNP	DNP	DNP	DNP	1150	DNP	1100	DNP	DNP	1270	**2750**	DNP	13575
5	(England) **Mohamed El Shorbagy**	13	DNP	1100	1810	700	675	250	DNP	DNP	DNP	DNP	DNP	**875**	410	700	DNP	DNP	250	805	DNP	2090	1100	1150	11915
6	(Egypt) **Tarek Momen**	13	DNP	DNP	1100	430	1810	675	700	DNP	430	DNP	490	DNP	1100	DNP	430	DNP	675	DNP	DNP	1270	675	700	10485
7	(Wales) **Joel Makin**	15	805	250	DNP	430	1100	1100	430	DNP	430	DNP	DNP	575	675	430	430	DNP	250	**1225**	DNP	475	410	DNP	9015
8	(Egypt) **Mazen Hesham**	17	300	410	675	260	410	675	DNP	DNP	260	1150	300	DNP	410	430	700	DNP	1100	DNP	700	475	250	430	8935
9	(Egypt) Marwan El Shorbagy	17	490	675	675	430	250	410	DNP	DNP	700	430	300	DNP	1100	430	260	DNP	410	182.5	DNP	780	675	260	8457.5
10	(France) Grégoire Marche	16	DNP	410	250	260	250	410	430	DNP	430	700	DNP	DNP	250	260	160	DNP	410	DNP	430	475	410	430	5965
11	(Egypt) Karim Abdel Gawad	15	182.5	250	410	430	250	250	DNP	DNP	430	DNP	300	DNP	410	430	DNP	**875**	410	490	260	475	DNP	DNP	5852.5
12	(Egypt) Youssef Soliman	17	112.5	675	250	DNP	410	410	260	130	260	430	DNP	350	250	260	DNP	575	410	300	DNP	475	250	DNP	5807.5
13	(Colombia) Miguel Ángel Rodríguez	14	182.5	1100	410	260	DNP	DNP	430	575	260	430	DNP	DNP	250	DNP	260	DNP	675	DNP	430	177.5	250	DNP	5690
14	(Egypt) Fares Dessouky	8	DNP	250	250	DNP	DNP	DNP	DNP	DNP	DNP	DNP	805	DNP	675	DNP	**1750**	DNP	250	DNP	DNP	780	675	DNP	5435
15	(Egypt) Youssef Ibrahim	12	490	250	DNP	260	250	410	DNP	DNP	260	260	DNP	DNP	1810	DNP	DNP	DNP	250	DNP	430	475	250	DNP	5395
16	(Switzerland) Nicolas Müller	15	DNP	250	DNP	DNP	250	250	DNP	215	DNP	260	182.5	DNP	250	700	430	DNP	675	112.5	260	475	410	260	4980

Bold – Players qualified for the final
(*) – Winners of Platinum's tournaments automatically qualifies for Finals.

Final tournament	Country	Location	Prize money	Date	2021–22 World Tour Champion
Men's PSA World Tour Finals	Egypt	Cairo	$200,000	21–26 June 2022	(Egypt) Mostafa Asal

== Women's ==
=== Tournaments ===
Tournament	Country	Location	Rank	Prize money	Date	Winner
Manchester Open	England	Manchester	Silver	$85,000	9–13 August 2021	(Egypt) Hania El Hammamy
Allam British Open	England	Hull	Platinum	$175,000	16–22 August 2021	(Egypt) Nour El Sherbini
CIB Egyptian Squash Open	Egypt	Cairo	Platinum	$270,000	10–17 September 2021	(Egypt) Nouran Gohar
Oracle Netsuite Open	United States	San Francisco	Gold	$121,000	22–27 September 2021	(United States) Amanda Sobhy
U.S. Open	United States	Philadelphia	Platinum	$165,500	1–8 October 2021	(Egypt) Nouran Gohar
DAC Pro Squash Classic	United States	Detroit	Bronze	$61,000	19–23 October 2021	(Egypt) Nouran Gohar
Malaysian Open	Malaysia	Kuala Lumpur	Bronze	$50,000	23–27 November 2021	(Malaysia) Aifa Azman
Black Ball Squash Open	Egypt	New Cairo	Gold	$112,500	12–16 December 2021	(Egypt) Nour El Sherbini
Cleveland Classic	United States	Cleveland	Bronze	$51,250	27–31 January 2022	(England) Georgina Kennedy
Cincinnati Gaynor Cup	United States	Cincinnati	Bronze	$51,250	2–6 February 2022	(Egypt) Nouran Gohar
Squash on Fire Open	United States	Washington, D.C.	Bronze	$50,000	16–20 February 2022	(Egypt) Nour El Sherbini
Windy City Open	United States	Chicago	Platinum	$250,000	23 Feb.–2 Mar. 2022	(Egypt) Nouran Gohar
Black Ball Squash Open	Egypt	Cairo	Platinum	$180,000	12–17 March 2022	(Egypt) Nouran Gohar
Allam British Open	England	Hull	Platinum	$180,000	28 Mar.–3 Apr. 2022	(Egypt) Hania El Hammamy
Manchester Open	England	Manchester	Silver	$77,500	13–18 April 2022	(New Zealand) Joelle King
Carol Weymuller Open	United States	New York City	Bronze	$51,250	20–24 April 2022	(Egypt) Rowan Elaraby
J.P. Morgan Tournament of Champions	United States	New York City	Gold	$115,000	1–7 May 2022	(Egypt) Nouran Gohar
PSA World Championships	Egypt	Cairo	W.C.	$550,000	13–21 May 2022	(Egypt) Nour El Sherbini
El Gouna International	Egypt	El Gouna	Platinum	$180,000	27 May.–3 Jun. 2022	(Egypt) Hania El Hammamy

=== Standings ===
World Championship
177.5	1st Round	290	2nd Round
475	3rd Round	780	Quarterfinalist
1270	Semifinalist	2090	Runner-up
**3175**	Winner		

Platinum
152.5	1st Round	250	2nd Round
410	3rd Round	675	Quarterfinalist
1100	Semifinalist	1810	Runner-up
**2750**	Winner		

Gold
160	1st Round	260	2nd Round
430	Quarterfinalist	700	Semifinalist
1150	Runner-up	**1750**	Winner

Silver
112.5	1st Round	182.5	2nd Round
300	Quarterfinalist	490	Semifinalist
805	Runner-up	**1225**	Winner

Bronze
80	1st Round	130	2nd Round
215	Quarterfinalist	350	Semifinalist
575	Runner-up	**875**	Winner

Top 16 Women's World Tour Standings 2021–22
Rank	Player	Tournaments Played	ENG (England)	GBR (United Kingdom)	EGY (Egypt)	USA (United States)	USA (United States)	USA (United States)	MYS (Malaysia)	EGY (Egypt)	USA (United States)	USA (United States)	USA (United States)	USA (United States)	EGY (Egypt)	GBR (United Kingdom)	ENG (England)	USA (United States)	USA (United States)	EGY (Egypt)	GBR (United Kingdom)	Total Points
1	(Egypt) **Nouran Gohar**	12	DNP	1810	**2750**	430	**2750**	**875**	DNP	700	DNP	**875**	DNP	**2750**	**2750**	1810	DNP	DNP	**1750**	2090	1810	23150
2	(Egypt) **Hania El Hammamy**	11	**1225**	1100	675	430	1810	DNP	DNP	1150	DNP	DNP	DNP	1810	410	**2750**	DNP	DNP	DNP	1270	**2750**	15380
3	(Egypt) **Nour El Sherbini**	9	DNP	**2750**	1810	DNP	1100	DNP	DNP	**1750**	DNP	DNP	**875**	1100	1810	DNP	DNP	DNP	DNP	**2750**	1100	15045
4	(United States) **Amanda Sobhy**	13	DNP	1100	1100	**1750**	410	DNP	DNP	DNP	DNP	215	DNP	675	675	1100	DNP	DNP	1150	780	250	9205
5	(New Zealand) **Joelle King**	12	DNP	675	DNP	700	675	215	DNP	260	DNP	DNP	575	1100	1100	1100	**1225**	DNP	DNP	475	675	8775
6	(England) **Sarah-Jane Perry**	13	805	675	250	700	675	DNP	DNP	260	575	130	DNP	DNP	675	675	805	DNP	DNP	780	675	7680
7	(Egypt) **Rowan Elaraby**	13	182.5	675	675	260	250	DNP	DNP	430	DNP	DNP	DNP	675	1100	410	DNP	**875**	430	780	250	6992.5
8	(England) **Georgina Kennedy**	12	DNP	152.5	DNP	DNP	410	575	DNP	700	**875**	350	DNP	675	675	410	300	DNP	DNP	475	410	6007.5
9	(Egypt) Salma Hany	12	DNP	250	675	1150	250	DNP	575	430	DNP	DNP	DNP	675	410	250	DNP	DNP	700	290	250	5905
10	(United States) Olivia Fiechter	13	DNP	250	250	260	1100	DNP	DNP	DNP	215	575	130	250	410	675	DNP	DNP	700	290	410	5515
11	(Belgium) Nele Gilis	14	300	250	410	DNP	675	215	DNP	260	DNP	215	215	410	410	410	490	DNP	DNP	475	410	5145
12	(Egypt) Nour El Tayeb	7	DNP	DNP	DNP	DNP	DNP	DNP	DNP	430	DNP	DNP	350	250	675	675	DNP	DNP	DNP	1270	1100	4750
13	(Egypt) Nadine Shahin	17	182.5	675	250	260	410	DNP	215	160	130	DNP	130	410	250	250	182.5	350	260	290	250	4655
14	(Belgium) Tinne Gilis	12	300	250	DNP	DNP	DNP	350	DNP	160	350	215	130	410	250	675	DNP	DNP	DNP	475	675	4240
15	(Wales) Tesni Evans	13	490	410	DNP	430	250	215	DNP	260	130	130	DNP	410	250	250	490	DNP	DNP	475	DNP	4190
16	(United States) Sabrina Sobhy	15	DNP	410	250	260	250	130	DNP	DNP	215	130	350	250	250	410	DNP	215	260	475	250	4105

Bold – Players qualified for the final
(*) – Winners of Platinum's tournaments automatically qualifies for Finals.

Final tournament	Country	Location	Prize money	Date	2021–22 World Tour Champion
Women's PSA World Tour Finals	Egypt	Cairo	$200,000	21–26 June 2022	(Egypt) Nour El Sherbini

== See also ==
- 2021–22 PSA World Tour
- Official Men's Squash World Ranking
- Official Women's Squash World Ranking
