= Squash at the 2013 Asian Youth Games =

- Venue: Olympic Sports Centre Squash Hall
- Dates: 17–23 August 2013

Squash at the 2013 Asian Youth Games was held at the Nanjing Olympic Sports Centre Squash Hall, Nanjing, China from August 17 to 23, 2013.

== Medalists ==
Event	Gold	Silver	Bronze
Boys' singles	Kush Kumar; Independent Olympic Athletes	Mohd Syafiq Kamal; Malaysia	Ng Eain Yow; Malaysia
Boys' singles	Kush Kumar; Independent Olympic Athletes	Mohd Syafiq Kamal; Malaysia	Yuen Tsun Hei; Hong Kong
Boys' team	Malaysia; Darren Chan; Mohd Syafiq Kamal; Ng Eain Yow	Independent Olympic Athletes; Madhav Yogesh Dhingra; Kush Kumar; Vijay Meena	Hong Kong; Lau Tsz Kwan; Chris Lo; Yuen Tsun Hei
Boys' team	Malaysia; Darren Chan; Mohd Syafiq Kamal; Ng Eain Yow	Independent Olympic Athletes; Madhav Yogesh Dhingra; Kush Kumar; Vijay Meena	Jordan; Mohammad Al-Saraj; Hamza Al-Zubaidi; Ali Assaf
Girls' singles	Vanessa Raj; Malaysia	Pansy Chan; Hong Kong	Mihiliya Methsarani; Sri Lanka
Girls' singles	Vanessa Raj; Malaysia	Pansy Chan; Hong Kong	Choi Uen Shan; Hong Kong
Girls' team	Malaysia; Rachel Arnold; Vanessa Raj; Celine Yeap	Hong Kong; Chan Ho Ching; Pansy Chan; Choi Uen Shan	Independent Olympic Athletes; Adya Advani; Harshit Kaur Jawanda; Tanvi Khanna
Girls' team	Malaysia; Rachel Arnold; Vanessa Raj; Celine Yeap	Hong Kong; Chan Ho Ching; Pansy Chan; Choi Uen Shan	Japan; Momoka Nakahira; Ayaka Shiraishi; Satomi Watanabe

== Medal table ==
Rank	Nation	Gold	Silver	Bronze	Total
1	Malaysia (MAS)	3	1	1	5
2	Independent Olympic Athletes (AOI)	1	1	1	3
3	Hong Kong (HKG)	0	2	3	5
4	Japan (JPN)	0	0	1	1
4	Jordan (JOR)	0	0	1	1
4	Sri Lanka (SRI)	0	0	1	1
Totals (6 entries)		4	4	8	16

== Results ==
=== Boys' singles ===
1st round – 17 August
Ryu Han-dong (KOR)	3–1 (8–11, 14–12, 11–8, 11–4)	Agung Wilant (INA)
Chanatip Hatachot (THA)	0–3 (5–11, 4–11, 6–11)	Oh Sung-hag (KOR)
Liang Jun (CHN)	0–3 (2–11, 4–11, 6–11)	Khaled Al-Jenaidel (KUW)
Yang Tianxia (CHN)	3–1 (11–5, 7–11, 11–8, 11–7)	Krittin Jindamang (THA)
Ryunosuke Tsukue (JPN)	3–2 (6–11, 11–9, 11–5, 9–11, 11–5)	Eissa Eshkanani (KUW)
Muhammad Nur Tastaftyan (INA)	3–0 (13–11, 11–6, 11–5)	Yusuke Ogata (JPN)

2nd round 17 August
Kush Kumar (AOI)	11	11	11
Hamza Al-Zubaidi (JOR)	7	5	7
Ryu Han-dong (KOR)	4	2	6
Chris Lo (HKG)	11	11	11
Israr Ahmed (PAK)	11	11	11
Oh Sung-hag (KOR)	6	9	2
Khaled Al-Jenaidel (KUW)	10	7	2
Ng Eain Yow (MAS)	12	11	11
Yuen Tsun Hei (HKG)	11	11	11
Yang Tianxia (CHN)	2	2	4
Ryunosuke Tsukue (JPN)	3	8	10
Vijay Meena (AOI)	11	11	12
Ravindu Laksiri (SRI)	11	11	11
Muhammad Nur Tastaftyan (INA)	5	9	7
Mohammad Al-Saraj (JOR)	8	11	7	11	5
Mohd Syafiq Kamal (MAS)	11	9	11	9	11

Quarterfinals; 18 August
Kush Kumar (AOI)	11	11	11	11
Chris Lo (HKG)	4	13	5	7
Israr Ahmed (PAK)	7	4	5
Ng Eain Yow (MAS)	11	11	11
Yuen Tsun Hei (HKG)	8	11	11	9	11
Vijay Meena (AOI)	11	6	3	11	9
Ravindu Laksiri (SRI)	7	3	9
Mohd Syafiq Kamal (MAS)	11	11	11

Semifinals; 18 August
Kush Kumar (AOI)	11	11	11	11
Ng Eain Yow (MAS)	6	13	9	8
Yuen Tsun Hei (HKG)	8	11	3	7
Mohd Syafiq Kamal (MAS)	11	7	11	11

Final; 19 August
Kush Kumar (AOI)	11	5	11	11
Mohd Syafiq Kamal (MAS)	9	11	9	7

=== Boys' team ===
==== Preliminary round ====
20–22 August

Pool A
Pos	Team	Pld	W	L	MF	MA	Pts	AOI	JOR	PAK	KOR	CHN
1	Independent Olympic Athletes	4	4	0	11	1	4	—	3–0	2–1	3–0	3–0
2	Jordan	4	3	1	8	4	3	0–3, 0–3, 0–3	—	2–1	3–0	3–0
3	Pakistan	4	2	2	6	6	2	0–3, 0–3, 3–2	0–3, 3–0, 0–3	—	2–1	2–1
4	South Korea	4	1	3	4	8	1	0–3, 0–3, 0–3	1–3, 0–3, 0–3	3–0, 2–3, 0–3	—	3–0
5	China	4	0	4	1	11	0	0–3, 0–3, 0–3	0–3, 0–3, 0–3	3–0, 0–3, 0–3	0–3, 0–3, 0–3	—

Pool B
Pos	Team	Pld	W	L	MF	MA	Pts	MAS	HKG	INA	JPN	KUW	THA
1	Malaysia	5	5	0	14	1	5	—	2–1	3–0	3–0	3–0	3–0
2	Hong Kong	5	4	1	12	3	4	1–3, 3–2, 0–3	—	2–1	3–0	3–0	3–0
3	Indonesia	5	2	3	7	8	2	0–3, 0–3, 0–3	0–3, 0–3, 3–1	—	2–1	1–2	3–0
4	Japan	5	2	3	6	9	2	0–3, 0–3, 2–3	0–3, 2–3, 0–3	0–3, 3–0, 1–3	—	2–1	3–0
5	Kuwait	5	2	3	6	9	2	1–3, 0–3, 0–3	0–3, 0–3, 0–3	0–3, 3–0, 3–0	0–3, 0–3, 3–0	—	3–0
6	Thailand	5	0	5	0	15	0	0–3, 0–3, 0–3	0–3, 0–3, 0–3	0–3, 0–3, 0–3	0–3, 0–3, 0–3	0–3, 0–3, 0–3	—

Source: ASF

==== Knockout round ====
Semifinals; 22 August				Final; 23 August
Independent Olympic Athletes	1	3	3
Hong Kong	3	2	2	Independent Olympic Athletes	3	2	1
Jordan	0	2		Malaysia	2	3	3
Malaysia	3	3

=== Girls' singles ===
1st round 17 August
Momoka Nakahira (JPN)	9	3	7
Tanvi Khanna (AOI)	11	11	11
Mihiliya Methsarani (SRI)	11	11	11
Maudy Wafa Nadiyah (INA)	8	6	4
Choi Uen Shan (HKG)	11	11	11
Yaisha Putri Yasandi (INA)	6	2	3
Duan Siyu (CHN)	2	4	1
Satomi Watanabe (JPN)	11	11	11
Harshit Kaur Jawanda (AOI)	11	11	11
Zhou Libo (CHN)	0	1	2

Quarterfinals; 17 August
Vanessa Raj (MAS)	11	11	11
Tanvi Khanna (AOI)	6	7	4
Mihiliya Methsarani (SRI)	5	5	11	11	11
Rachel Arnold (MAS)	11	11	3	9	7
Choi Uen Shan (HKG)	11	8	11	11
Satomi Watanabe (JPN)	7	11	3	6
Harshit Kaur Jawanda (AOI)	9	11	3	10
Pansy Chan (HKG)	11	2	11	12

Semifinals; 18 August
Vanessa Raj (MAS)	11	11	11
Mihiliya Methsarani (SRI)	0	5	9
Choi Uen Shan (HKG)	11	11	16	2	7
Pansy Chan (HKG)	6	9	18	11	11

Final; 19 August
Vanessa Raj (MAS)	11	6	11	11
Pansy Chan (HKG)	3	11	7	9

=== Girls' team ===
==== Preliminary round ====
20–21 August

Pool A
Pos	Team	Pld	W	L	MF	MA	Pts	MAS	JPN	CHN
1	Malaysia	2	2	0	6	0	2	—	3–0	3–0
2	Japan	2	1	1	3	3	1	0–3, 0–3, 0–3	—	3–0
3	China	2	0	2	0	6	0	0–3, 0–3, 0–3	0–3, 0–3, 0–3	—

Pool B
Pos	Team	Pld	W	L	MF	MA	Pts	HKG	AOI	INA
1	Hong Kong	2	2	0	6	0	2	—	3–0	3–0
2	Independent Olympic Athletes	2	1	1	3	3	1	0–3, 0–3, 0–3	—	3–0
3	Indonesia	2	0	2	0	6	0	0–3, 0–3, 0–3	0–3, 0–3, 0–3	—

Source: ASF

==== Knockout round ====
Semifinals; 22 August				Final; 23 August
Malaysia	3	3
Independent Olympic Athletes	0	2		Malaysia	3	3
Japan	0	3	0	Hong Kong	1	1
Hong Kong	3	0	3
