= Pansy Chan =

Hong Kong squash player (born 1996)

Personal information
- Full name: Chan Pui Hei, Pansy
- Nickname: Pansy

Sport
- Country: Hong Kong
Medal record
Representing Hong Kong
Squash
Asian Youth Games
Silver medal – second place	2013 Nanjing	Women's Individual
Silver medal – second place	2013 Nanjing	Women's Team
World Junior Team Championships
Bronze medal – third place	2013 Wrocław	Team
Asian Junior Team Championships
Silver medal – second place	2013 Seoul	Team
Asian Junior Squash Individual Championships
Gold medal – first place	2010 Colombo	Girls Under 15

Pansy Chan is a female squash player who represents Hong Kong at international level.

== Awards ==
2010:

- Hong Kong Junior Sports Stars Awards, Sports Federation & Olympic Committee of Hong Kong, China
- ZESPRI Outstanding Junior Athlete Awards (3rd Quarter 2010), Hong Kong Sports Institute

2012:

- Hong Kong Outstanding Teens Award
- Hong Kong Island Excellent Students Award
- BOCHK Outstanding Athlete Award (squash)

2013:

- Sports for Hope Foundation Outstanding Junior Athlete Awards (1st Quarter 2013), Hong Kong Sports Institute
- Sports for Hope Foundation Outstanding Junior Athlete Awards (3rd Quarter 2013), Hong Kong Sports Institute
- BOCHK Outstanding Athlete Award (squash)

== Sports achievements ==
2010:

- Asian Junior Squash Individual Championships - GU15 Champion
- Hong Kong Junior Squash Open - GU15 - First Runner-Up
- Hong Kong Junior Squash Championships - GU15 Champion

2011:

- Australia National Junior Series - GU15 Champion
- Pioneer Junior Open - GU17 - First Runner-Up
- Dutch Junior Open- GU17 - First Runner-Up
- Hong Kong Junior Open Squash - GU17 Champion

2012:

- Hong Kong Junior Open Squash - GU17 Champion
- Korea Open - Women's Open - 2nd Runner-up
- Inter-School Individual Squash Competition - Girls A Grade - Champion
- Hong Kong Junior Squash Championships - GU19 - 2nd Runner-Up
- BUFF Singapore Squash Open - GU17 - Champion

2013:

- Asian Junior Squash Team Championship - Silver Medal
- Women's World Junior Team Squash Championships - Bronze Medal
- Asian Youth Games - Squash (Women's Individual) - Silver Medal
- Asian Youth Games - Squash (Women's Team) - Silver Medal
