= 2022 Men's PSA World Tour Finals =

PSA World Tour Finals
- 4th Men's PSA World Tour Finals
- Location: Cairo, Egypt
- Venue: Mall of Arabia
- Date: 21–26 June 2022
- Website; Official website
- Prize money: $200,000

Results
- Champion: Mostafa Asal (EGY)
- Runner-up: Paul Coll (NZL)
- Semi-finalists: Mohamed El Shorbagy (ENG); Ali Farag (EGY)

The 2022 CIB Men's PSA World Tour Finals is the men's third edition of the PSA World Tour Finals (Prize money : $200,000). The top 8 players in the 2021–22 PSA World Tour are qualified for the event. As previous year, the event took place at Mall of Arabia, Cairo in Egypt from 21 to 26 June 2022.

It's the fourth edition under the PSA World Tour Finals label after the PSA renamed PSA World Series to current PSA World Tour Finals. CIB remains as the title sponsor.

== PSA World Ranking Points ==
PSA also awards points towards World Ranking. Points are awarded as follows:

PSA World Tour Finals		Ranking Points				
Rank	Prize money US$	Winner	Runner up	3/4	Round-Robin Match Win	Undefeated bonus
World Tour Finals	$200,000	1000	550	200	150	150

=== Match points distribution ===
Points towards the standings are awarded when the following scores:

Match score	Points
2–0 win	4 points
2–1 win	3 points
1–2 loss	1 point
0–2 loss	0 points

== Qualification & Seeds ==
=== Qualification ===
Top eight players at 2021–22 PSA World Tour standings qualifies to Finals.

World Championship
177.5	1st Round	290	2nd Round
475	3rd Round	780	Quarterfinalist
1270	Semifinalist	2090	Runner-up
**3175**	Winner		

Platinum
152.5	1st Round	250	2nd Round
410	3rd Round	675	Quarterfinalist
1100	Semifinalist	1810	Runner-up
**2750**	Winner		

Gold
160	1st Round	260	2nd Round
430	Quarterfinalist	700	Semifinalist
1150	Runner-up	**1750**	Winner

Silver
112.5	1st Round	182.5	2nd Round
300	Quarterfinalist	490	Semifinalist
805	Runner-up	**1225**	Winner

Bronze
80	1st Round	130	2nd Round
215	Quarterfinalist	350	Semifinalist
575	Runner-up	**875**	Winner

Top 16 Men's PSA World Tour Standings 2021–22
Rank	Player	Tournaments Played	ENG (England)	GBR (United Kingdom)	EGY (Egypt)	USA (United States)	USA (United States)	QAT (Qatar)	ENG (England)	MYS (Malaysia)	EGY (Egypt)	USA (United States)	USA (United States)	USA (United States)	USA (United States)	ENG (England)	ENG (England)	PAK (Pakistan)	GBR (United Kingdom)	ENG (England)	USA (United States)	EGY (Egypt)	EGY (Egypt)	MRI (Mauritius)	Total Points
1	(Egypt) **Ali Farag**	14	DNP	1810	**2750**	**1750**	675	DNP	1150	DNP	1150	**1750**	DNP	DNP	675	**1750**	DNP	DNP	1810	DNP	**1750**	**3175**	1100	DNP	21295
2	(New Zealand) **Paul Coll**	14	DNP	**2750**	1100	1150	675	1810	**1750**	DNP	**1750**	DNP	490	DNP	**2750**	DNP	260	DNP	**2750**	DNP	DNP	1270	1810	700	21015
3	(Peru) **Diego Elías**	14	**1225**	675	DNP	DNP	1100	**2750**	700	DNP	DNP	DNP	**1225**	DNP	250	1150	700	DNP	675	DNP	1150	780	675	**1750**	14805
4	(Egypt) **Mostafa Asal**	13	DNP	675	250	700	**2750**	1100	430	DNP	700	700	DNP	DNP	DNP	DNP	1150	DNP	1100	DNP	DNP	1270	**2750**	DNP	13575
5	(England) **Mohamed El Shorbagy**	13	DNP	1100	1810	700	675	250	DNP	DNP	DNP	DNP	DNP	**875**	410	700	DNP	DNP	250	805	DNP	2090	1100	1150	11915
6	(Egypt) **Tarek Momen**	13	DNP	DNP	1100	430	1810	675	700	DNP	430	DNP	490	DNP	1100	DNP	430	DNP	675	DNP	DNP	1270	675	700	10485
7	(Wales) **Joel Makin**	15	805	250	DNP	430	1100	1100	430	DNP	430	DNP	DNP	575	675	430	430	DNP	250	**1225**	DNP	475	410	DNP	9015
8	(Egypt) **Mazen Hesham**	17	300	410	675	260	410	675	DNP	DNP	260	1150	300	DNP	410	430	700	DNP	1100	DNP	700	475	250	430	8935
9	(Egypt) Marwan El Shorbagy	17	490	675	675	430	250	410	DNP	DNP	700	430	300	DNP	1100	430	260	DNP	410	182.5	DNP	780	675	260	8457.5
10	(France) Grégoire Marche	16	DNP	410	250	260	250	410	430	DNP	430	700	DNP	DNP	250	260	160	DNP	410	DNP	430	475	410	430	5965
11	(Egypt) Karim Abdel Gawad	15	182.5	250	410	430	250	250	DNP	DNP	430	DNP	300	DNP	410	430	DNP	**875**	410	490	260	475	DNP	DNP	5852.5
12	(Egypt) Youssef Soliman	17	112.5	675	250	DNP	410	410	260	130	260	430	DNP	350	250	260	DNP	575	410	300	DNP	475	250	DNP	5807.5
13	(Colombia) Miguel Ángel Rodríguez	14	182.5	1100	410	260	DNP	DNP	430	575	260	430	DNP	DNP	250	DNP	260	DNP	675	DNP	430	177.5	250	DNP	5690
14	(Egypt) Fares Dessouky	8	DNP	250	250	DNP	DNP	DNP	DNP	DNP	DNP	DNP	805	DNP	675	DNP	**1750**	DNP	250	DNP	DNP	780	675	DNP	5435
15	(Egypt) Youssef Ibrahim	12	490	250	DNP	260	250	410	DNP	DNP	260	260	DNP	DNP	1810	DNP	DNP	DNP	250	DNP	430	475	250	DNP	5395
16	(Switzerland) Nicolas Müller	15	DNP	250	DNP	DNP	250	250	DNP	215	DNP	260	182.5	DNP	250	700	430	DNP	675	112.5	260	475	410	260	4980

Bold – Players qualified for the final
(*) – Winners of Platinum's tournaments automatically qualifies for Finals.

=== Seeds ===
1. (Egypt) Ali Farag
2. (New Zealand) Paul Coll
3. (Peru) Diego Elías
4. (Egypt) Mostafa Asal
5. (England) Mohamed El Shorbagy
6. (Egypt) Tarek Momen
7. (Wales) Joel Makin
8. (Egypt) Mazen Hesham

== Group stage results ==
Times are Eastern European Time (UTC+02:00). To the best of three games.

=== Group A ===
Date	Time	Player 1	Player 2	Score
21 June	19:30	Mohamed El Shorbagy (ENG)	Mazen Hesham (EGY)	11–4, 9–11, 11–5
22 June	19:30	Ali Farag (EGY)	Diego Elías (PER)	8–11, 11–6, 11–3
23 June	19:30	Diego Elías (PER)	Mohamed El Shorbagy (ENG)	11–6, 11–7
23 June	20:45	Ali Farag (EGY)	Mazen Hesham (EGY)	11–3, 9–11, 11–2
24 June	19:30	Diego Elías (PER)	Mazen Hesham (EGY)	11–5, 12–10
24 June	20:45	Ali Farag (EGY)	Mohamed El Shorbagy (ENG)	11–8, 12–10

==== Standings ====
Pos	Team	Pld	W	L	GF	GA	GD	Pts	Qualification
1	Ali Farag (EGY)	3	3	0	6	2	+4	10	Advancing to Semifinals
2	Mohamed El Shorbagy (ENG)	3	2	1	4	3	+1	7	Advancing to Semifinals
3	Diego Elías (PER)	3	1	2	3	4	−1	5	
4	Mazen Hesham (EGY)	3	0	3	2	6	−4	2	

Source: PSA World Tour Finals

=== Group B ===
Date	Time	Player 1	Player 2	Score
21 June	20:45	Paul Coll (NZL)	Tarek Momen (EGY)	11–9, 10–12, 8-11
21 June	22:00	Mostafa Asal (EGY)	Joel Makin (WAL)	11–7, 3–11, 11–7
22 June	20:45	Paul Coll (NZL)	Joel Makin (WAL)	12–10, 11–5
22 June	22:00	Mostafa Asal (EGY)	Tarek Momen (EGY)	11–8, 12–10
23 June	22:00	Paul Coll (NZL)	Mostafa Asal (EGY)	11–8, 11–5
24 June	22:00	Tarek Momen (EGY)	Joel Makin (WAL)	11–7, 14–12

==== Standings ====
Pos	Team	Pld	W	L	GF	GA	GD	Pts	Qualification
1	Paul Coll (NZL)	3	2	1	5	2	+3	9	Advancing to Semifinals
2	Mostafa Asal (EGY)	3	2	1	4	3	+1	7	Advancing to Semifinals
3	Joel Makin (WAL)	3	1	2	3	4	−1	5	
4	Tarek Momen (EGY)	3	1	2	2	5	−3	3	

Source: PSA World Tour Finals

== Knockout stage ==
Semi finals (25 June)
1	Ali Farag (EGY)	4	6
4	Mostafa Asal (EGY)	11	11
2	Paul Coll (NZL)	11	11
5	Mohamed El Shorbagy (ENG)	6	5

Final (26 June)
4	Mostafa Asal (EGY)	13	11	11
2	Paul Coll (NZL)	11	8	7

=== Semifinal ===
To the best of three games.

Date	Time	Player 1	Player 2	Score
25 June	19:35	Ali Farag (EGY)	Mostafa Asal (EGY)	11–4, 11–6
25 June	20:45	Paul Coll (NZL)	Mohamed El Shorbagy (ENG)	11–6, 11–5

=== Final ===
To the best of five games.

Date	Time	Player 1	Player 2	Score
26 June	20:30	Mostafa Asal (EGY)	Paul Coll (NZL)	13–11, 11–8, 11–7

2022 Men's PSA World Tour Finals winner
(Egypt)
Mostafa Asal
Second title

== See also ==
- 2022 Women's PSA World Tour Finals
- 2021–22 PSA World Tour
