= Rebecca Barnett =

New Zealand squash player

Personal information
- Born: Hutt Valley, New Zealand

Sport
- Turned pro: 2009

Rebecca Barnett is a New Zealand professional squash player. She represents New Zealand national women's squash team in international competitions. Her twin brother Jonathan Barnett is also a squash player. She is also one of the prominent squash players to have represented New Zealand in international level.

== Career ==
Barnett developed an interest initially in advertising during the early part of her career as a youngster. She also took an interest in broadcasting, however she changed gears to pursue her higher studies at the Massey University in Palmerston North. She also pursued her career as a squash player playing for the Lower Hutt Mitchell Park Squash Clib while spending her first year as a college going student at the Massey University. She and her brother competed at the 2012 New Zealand Junior Open and interestingly both of them emerged as winners in their respective singles events.

She emerged at the youth level notably at the 2013 Women's World Junior Squash Championships where she reached quarter finals and for her reputed performance in the competition, she was named in the New Zealand squad for the 2014 Women's World Team Squash Championships. She also made few international appearances since 2011 prior to her maiden Women's World Team Squash Championships. However New Zealand were knocked out of the first round of the tournament. In 2018, she was also awarded the Rookie Marketer of the Year by Loyalty New Zealand.
