= Julie Rossignol =

French squash player (born 1997)

Personal information
- Born: 23 July 1997 (age 29) Saint Germain en Laye, France

Sport
- Country: France
- Retired: Active
- Racquet used: Dunlop

Women's singles
- Highest ranking: No. 111 (January 2018)
- Current ranking: No. 116 (February 2018)
- Updated on February, 2018

Julie Rossignol (born 23 July 1997 in Saint Germain en Laye) is a French professional squash player. As of February 2018, she was ranked number 116 in the world.
