= Maria Elena Ubina =

American squash player (born 1995)

Personal information
- Born: January 13, 1995 (age 31) New York, United States

Sport
- Country: United States
- Handedness: Right Handed
- Turned pro: 2009
- Coached by: Kumail Mehmood
- Retired: Active
- Racquet used: Harrow

Women's singles
- Highest ranking: No. 110 (January, 2014)

Maria Elena Ubina (born January 13, 1995, in New York) is a professional squash player who represents the United States. She reached a career high world ranking of World No. 110 in January 2014.
