= Victoria Temple-Murray =

British squash player (born 1994)

Personal information
- Born: 30 July 1994 (age 31) Exeter, England

Sport
- Country: England
- Handedness: Right Handed
- Turned pro: 2012
- Coached by: Paul Smith
- Retired: Active
- Racquet used: Dunlop

Women's singles
- Highest ranking: No. 67 (December, 2014)
- Current ranking: No. 68 (January, 2015)
- Updated on January, 2015

Victoria Temple-Murray, (born 30 July 1994 in Exeter) is a professional squash player who represents England. She reached a career-high world ranking of World No. 67 in December 2014.
