= Ho Ka Po =

Hong Kong squash player (born 1994)

Personal information
- Born: October 27, 1994 (age 31) Hong Kong

Sport
- Country: Hong Kong
- Handedness: Right Handed
- Turned pro: 2009
- Coached by: Tony Choi
- Retired: Active
- Racquet used: Head

Women's singles
- Highest ranking: No. 110 (November, 2010)
- Current ranking: No. 123 (July, 2013)
- Updated on July, 2013

Ho Ka Po (traditional Chinese: 何嘉寶; simplified Chinese: 何嘉宝; born October 27, 1994, in Hong Kong) is a retired professional squash player who represented Hong Kong and reached a career-high world ranking of No. 110 in November 2010.

When she was an eight- or nine-year-old primary school student, Ho started practicing mini-squash. When she was 14 years old, Ho participated in the 2009 World Junior Team Championships, where she made her debut as a competitor for Hong Kong. Ho's coach in 2013 was Rebecca Chiu. That year, her training schedule consisted of two-hour sessions five to six times every week at the Hong Kong Sports Institute. Upon completing her exams, she increased the number of weekly practice sessions to ten. In the summer of 2013, Ho was the inaugural Hong Kong player to place first in the international junior rankings for women. She reached the ranking through assisting Hong Kong in securing third place In May at the World Junior Team Championships held in Poland as well as her becoming the champion at the Asian Junior Championships held in Jordan in June. After she turned 19, Ho became ineligible for the junior rankings. In the senior rankings, she was ranked 120 in October 2013. That year, Ho was a Hong Kong Polytechnic University student working towards a hotel management diploma.

By 2021, Ho had retired from competing in squash. She had become a teaching assistant and school sports promotion officer after retiring. In October 2021, she took on the role of manager of recreation and sports at the Home Affairs Bureau. In the position, she put on major sporting competitions.
