= Reeham Sedky =

American squash player (born 1997)

Personal information
- Nickname: The Hammer
- Born: April 24, 1997 (age 29) Seattle, United States
- Height: 166 cm (5 ft 5 in)
- Weight: 53 kg (117 lb)

Sport
- Country: United States
- Handedness: Right handed
- Coached by: Khaled Sedky
- Retired: Active
- Racquet used: Harrow

Women's singles
- Highest ranking: No. 54 (November 2018)
- Current ranking: No. 58 (August 2019)
- Updated on October 2018

Reeham Sedky (born 24 April 1997 in Seattle, United States) is an American professional squash player. As of August 2019, she was ranked number 58 in the world. In 2016 she was named player of the year by the United States Olympic Committee.

She is class of 2019 at University of Pennsylvania. She plays on the varsity squash team. She has played the top position all four years of her college career so far. She is currently the CSA individual winner and two-time Ivy League Player of the Year.
