= Sabrina Sobhy =

American squash player (born 1996)

Personal information
- Born: December 30, 1996 (age 29) Long Island, New York, United States
- Education: Harvard College
- Height: 5 ft 3 in (160 cm)
- Weight: 128 lb (58 kg)

Sport
- Handedness: Right-handed
- Turned pro: 2011
- Coached by: Alex Stait
- Retired: Active
- Racquet used: Dunlop

Women's singles
- Highest ranking: 13 (September 2023)
- Current ranking: 15 (8 June 2026)
- Title: 6
Medal record
Women's squash
Representing the United States
World Team Championships
Silver medal – second place	2022 Cairo	Team
Pan American Games
Gold medal – first place	2019 Lima	Doubles
Gold medal – first place	2019 Lima	Team

Sabrina Sobhy (born December 30, 1996) is an American professional squash player who represents the United States. She reached a career-high world ranking of World No. 13 in September 2023.

== Biography ==
Sabrina Sobhy was born on Long Island and grew up in Sea Cliff, New York.

Sobhy is class of 2019 at Harvard University, having majored in psychology. She played #1 on the Harvard Crimson women's squash|varsity squash team for all 4 years. She was the co-captain of the team her senior year and led the team to an undefeated season. During her tenure on the Harvard Women's Varsity Squash Team, they won 4 Team National Titles all four years of her college career. Sabrina was also awarded the Ivy League Player of the Year Freshman and Senior years. In 2014, Sabrina made history as the youngest player to ever win both the U.S. Junior and Senior National Titles in the same year. Over an 8 year span, Sabrina has been selected to compete on both the U.S. Junior and Women's National teams, experiencing international competition and helping the US Woman's National Team achieve their highest ranking to date. In July 2019 Sabrina became a two-time gold medalist at the Pan American Games, in Lima, Peru, in both the team and the doubles events. Sabrina was teamed up in the doubles with her sister, Amanda Sobhy, a top U.S. women's squash player who also went to Harvard and is currently ranked 4 in the world as of April 2022. They have been referred to as "The Williams Sisters of Squash."

In 2022, she was part of the United States team that reached the final of the 2022 Women's World Team Squash Championships. It was the first time that the United States had reached the final.

As the 12th seed, she reached the third round at the 2024 PSA Women's World Squash Championship, losing out to eventual winner Nouran Gohar.

In November 2025, she won her 6th PSA title after securing victory in the St. James Open during the 2025–26 PSA Squash Tour.

== See also ==
- Official Women's Squash World Ranking
