= 2025–26 PSA Squash Tour =

International squash tour

Details
- Event name: PSA Squash Tour 2025–26
- Dates: August 2025 – July 2026
- Categories: World Championship: Men's/Women's; PSA Squash Tour Finals: Men's/Women's; PSA Challenger Events; Satellite & Federation Events
- Website; PSA Squash Tour

Achievements
- World Number 1: Men: (Egypt) Mostafa Asal; Women: (Egypt) Hania El Hammamy
- World Champion: Men: (Egypt) Mostafa Asal; Women: (Egypt) Amina Orfi

The 2025–26 PSA Squash Tour is the international squash tour organised circuit organized by the Professional Squash Association (PSA) for the 2025–26 squash season. It's the 11th PSA season since the merger of PSA and WSA associations in 2015.

The most important tournaments in the series are the PSA World Championship for Men's and Women's. The tour also features two circuits of regular events—PSA World Events (formerly PSA World Tour), which feature the highest prize money and the best fields; and PSA Challenger Events with prize money ranging $3,000–$15,000. In the middle of the year (usually in June), the PSA Squash Tour - World Events tour is concluded by the Men's and Women's PSA Squash Tour Finals in a to be determined venue, the season-ending championships for the top 8 rated players from PSA World Events level tournaments.

== Overview ==
=== PSA World Events changes ===
Starting in August 2024, PSA revamped its professional tour structure into two individual circuits; PSA World Events and PSA Challenger Events.

PSA World Events (formerly PSA World Tour) will comprise the most important tournaments in prize money for more experienced and higher-ranked players, including PSA World Championships and PSA Squash Tour Finals, labeled as follows:

- PSA World Championships — 64-players draw — $600,000
- PSA Squash Tour Finals — 8-players draw — $300,000
- PSA World Events Diamond — 48-player draw — $300,000 - (starting August 2024)
- PSA World Events Platinum — 32-players draw — $190,000
- PSA World Events Gold — 24-players draw — $100,000
- PSA World Events Silver — 24-players draw — $75,000
- PSA World Events Bronze — 24-players draw — $50,000
- PSA World Events Copper — 24-player draw — $25,000 - (starting August 2024)

PSA Challenger Events (formerly Challenger Tour) tournaments will offer a $3,000–$15,000 prize money, an ideal circuit for less-experienced and upcoming players, that will include the following tiers:

- PSA Challenger Events 15 — $15,000
- PSA Challenger Events 12 — $12,000
- PSA Challenger Events 9 — $9,000
- PSA Challenger Events 6 — $6,000
- PSA Challenger Events 3 — $3,000

=== Prize money/ranking points breakdown ===
PSA Squash Tour events also have a separate World Events ranking. Points for this are calculated on a cumulative basis after each World Events event. The top eight players at the end of the calendar year are then eligible to play in the PSA Squash Tour Finals.

Ranking points vary according to tournament tier being awarded as follows:

PSA World Championships			Ranking Points
Rank	Prize money US$	Ranking Points	Winner	Runner up	3/4	5/8	9/16	17/32	33/64
PSA World Championships	$600,000	27683 points	3500	2275	1400	875	525	321	196
PSA Squash Tour Finals			Ranking Points
Rank	Prize money US$	Winner	Runner up	3/4	Round-Robin Match Win	Undefeated bonus
PSA Squash Tour Finals	$300,000	1000	550	200	150	150
PSA World Events			Ranking Points
Rank	Prize money US$	Ranking Points	Winner	Runner up	3/4	5/8	9/16	17/32	33/48
Diamond	$300,000	24511 points	3100	2015	1240	775	465	284	173.5
Platinum	$190,000	17132 points	2800	1820	1120	700	420	257
Gold	$100,000	11010 points	1800	1170	720	450	270	165
Silver	$75,000	8261.5 points	1350	877.5	540	337.5	202.5	124
Bronze	$50,000	5505 points	900	585	360	225	135	82.5
Copper	$25,000	3061 points	500	325	200	125	75	46
PSA Challenger Events			Ranking Points
Rank	Prize money US$	Ranking Points	Winner	Runner up	3/4	5/8	9/16	17/32	33/48
Challenger Events 15	$15,000	1835 points	300	195	120	75	45	27.5
Challenger Events 12	$12,000	1468 points	240	156	96	60	36	22
Challenger Events 9	$9,000	1101 points	180	117	72	45	27	16.5
Challenger Events 6	$6,000	734 points	120	78	48	30	18	11
Challenger Events 3	$3,000	367 points	60	39	24	15	9	5.5
PSA Satellite Events			Ranking Points
Rank	Prize money US$	Ranking Points	Winner	Runner up	3/4	5/8	9/16	17/32	33/64
PSA Satellite Events	$1,000 – $3,000	183.5 points	30	19.5	12	7.5	4.5	2.75

== Calendar ==
=== Key ===
PSA Tiers
World Championship
World Events Diamond
World Events Platinum
World Events Gold
World Events Silver
World Events Bronze
World Events Copper
Challenger Events 3/6/9/12/15

=== August ===
Tournament	Date	Champion	Runner-Up	Semifinalists	Quarterfinalists
DJED - SSA/Meysan Open (Egypt) Cairo, Egypt; Men: Challenger 3; 16 players – $3,000	1–4 August	(Egypt) Ahmed Rashed; 11–7, 6–11, 11–8, 11–3 (1st PSA title)	(Egypt) Taha ElShafei	(Egypt) Omar Bahgat (Egypt) Ahmed Sobhy	(Egypt) Yassin Yacout (Egypt) Malek Abozahra (Egypt) Ali Rahma (Egypt) Ahmed Sherif
ESF Tournament #1 (Egypt) Giza, Egypt; Men: Challenger 9; 32 players – $9,000 −−−−−− Women: Challenger 9; 32 players – $9,000	2–6 August	(Egypt) Salman Khalil; 11–7, 11–5, 6–1^{rtd.} (4th PSA title)	(Egypt) Omar Said	(Egypt) Seif Tamer (Egypt) Mohamed Nasser	(Egypt) Hazem Hossam (Egypt) Adam Hawal (Egypt) Seif Shenawy (Egypt) Khaled Labib
ESF Tournament #1 (Egypt) Giza, Egypt; Men: Challenger 9; 32 players – $9,000 −−−−−− Women: Challenger 9; 32 players – $9,000	2–6 August	(Egypt) Nadien Elhammamy; 11–9, 2–11, 11–2, 12–10 (4th PSA title)	(Egypt) Jana Swaify	(Egypt) Hana Ismail (Egypt) Farida Walid	(Egypt) Zeina Zein (Egypt) Jana Safy (Egypt) Rouqaia Othman (Egypt) Habiba Hani
HCL Squash Indian Tour #1 (India) Jaipur, India; Men: Challenger 9; 32 players – $9,000 −−−−−− Women: Challenger 9; 32 players – $9,000	4–8 August	(Egypt) Yassin Shohdy; 11–5, 11–7, 11–3 (6th PSA title)	(Egypt) Mohamed Gohar	(Sri Lanka) Ravindu Laksiri (Egypt) Seif Refaay	(Malaysia) Darren Pragasam (Hong Kong) Lap Man Au (Canada) Karim Aguib (Japan) Naoki Hayashi
HCL Squash Indian Tour #1 (India) Jaipur, India; Men: Challenger 9; 32 players – $9,000 −−−−−− Women: Challenger 9; 32 players – $9,000	4–8 August	(Egypt) Nour Khafagy; 11–3, 5–11, 11–5, 12–10 (3rd PSA title)	(India) Tanvi Khanna	(Japan) Akari Midorikawa (Malaysia) Goh Zhi Xuan	(Egypt) Menna Walid (India) Anjali Semwal (India) Shameena Riaz (India) Pooja Arthi
City of Devonport Tasmanian Open (Australia) Devonport, Australia; Men: Challenger 9; 32 players – $9,000 −−−−−− Women: Challenger 6; 32 players – $6,000	6–10 August	(Hong Kong) Matthew Lai; 11–9, 11–5, 11–1 (3rd PSA title)	(Australia) Dylan Molinaro	(Hong Kong) Wong Chi Him (Hong Kong) Leo Chung	(Australia) Jack Hudson (Australia) Brendan MacDonald (Belgium) Joeri Hapers (Malaysia) Bryan Lim
City of Devonport Tasmanian Open (Australia) Devonport, Australia; Men: Challenger 9; 32 players – $9,000 −−−−−− Women: Challenger 6; 32 players – $6,000	6–10 August	(Spain) Noa Romero; 11–9, 11–5, 11–1 (4th PSA title)	(New Zealand) Ella Lash	(Macau) Gigi Yeung (South Korea) Song Chae-won	(Australia) Sophie Fadaely (Republic of Ireland) Breanne Flynn (South Korea) Heo Min-gyeong (Australia) Madison Lyon
NSW Squash Bega Open (Australia) Bega, Australia; Women: World Events – Copper; 32 players – $27,500	13–17 August	(Egypt) Habiba Hani; 9–11, 11–5, 11–8, 10–4^{rtd.} (5th PSA title)	(India) Anahat Singh	(Egypt) Nour Khafagy (India) Akanksha Salunkhe	(Spain) Noa Romero (Hong Kong) Cheng Nga Ching (South Africa) Hayley Ward (Australia) Alex Haydon
Life Time Johns Creek Clemens Open (United States) Johns Creek, United States; Men: Challenger 12; 32 players – $12,000	13–17 August	(Pakistan) Ashab Irfan; 8–11, 11–2, 11–2, 11–6 (6th PSA title)	(Malaysia) Nathan Kueh	(Pakistan) Asim Khan (Brazil) Diego Gobbi	(Egypt) Omar Elkattan (Colombia) Mateo Restrepo (Mexico) César Segundo (South Africa) Callan Hall
White Bear Challenge (United States) North Sea, United States; Men: Challenger 6; 24 players - $6,000	26–30 August	(Egypt) Marwan Tamer; 11–3, 11–7, 11–3 (1st PSA title)	(England) Yusuf Sheikh	(Egypt) Omar El Torkey (Mexico) César Segundo	(Australia) Joseph White (United States) Hollis Robertson (Canada) Elliott Hunt (Pakistan) Huzaifa Ibrahim
Tuanku Muhriz Trophy (Malaysia) Seremban, Malaysia; Men: Challenger 15; 32 players - $15,000 −−−−−− Women: Challenger 15; 32 players - $15,000	27–31 August	(Egypt) Mohamed Sharaf; 8–11, 11–9, 11–3, 15–13 (6th PSA title)	(Malaysia) Ameeshenraj Chandaran	(Egypt) Aly Hussein (Pakistan) Nasir Iqbal	(Egypt) Yassin Shohdy (Hong Kong) Henry Leung (Malaysia) Duncan Lee (Egypt) Seif Shenawy
Tuanku Muhriz Trophy (Malaysia) Seremban, Malaysia; Men: Challenger 15; 32 players - $15,000 −−−−−− Women: Challenger 15; 32 players - $15,000	27–31 August	(Egypt) Nadien Elhammamy; 11–4, 11–2, 11–2 (5th PSA title)	(Malaysia) Ainaa Amani	(Egypt) Nour Khafagy (Egypt) Nardine Garas	(Egypt) Nour Heikal (Egypt) Jana Swaify (Ukraine) Alina Bushma (Malaysia) Zoe Foo
Independence Day Open (Uzbekistan) Tashkent, Uzbekistan; Men: Challenger 3; 32 players - $3,000	29–31 August	(Pakistan) Tayyab Aslam; 11–9, 11–8, 11–6 (13th PSA title)	(Iran) Sepehr Etemadpoor	(Iran) Pouya Shafieifard (Individual Neutral Athletes) Makar Esin	(Qatar) Salem Al-Malki (Egypt) Youssef Hashem (Pakistan) Kaleem Shoaib (Hong Kong) Wilson Chan

=== September ===
Tournament	Date	Champion	Runner-Up	Semifinalists	Quarterfinalists
IACT Fitzwilliam Ladies Open (Republic of Ireland) Dublin, Ireland; Women: Challenger 3; 16 players - $3,000	4–6 September	(Republic of Ireland) Breanne Flynn; 11–5, 11–9, 11–8 (1st PSA title)	(France) Élise Romba	(England) Isabel McCullough (Australia) Erin Classen	(Wales) Ellie Breach (Czech Republic) Karolína Šrámková (Scotland) Robyn McAlpine (England) Polly Clark
London Squash Classic (England) London, England; Men: World Events – Gold; 32 players – $133,500 −−−−−− Women: World Events – Gold; 32 players – $133,500	2–7 September	(New Zealand) Paul Coll; 13–11, 11–7, 11–8 (28th PSA title)	(Wales) Joel Makin	(Peru) Diego Elías (Malaysia) Eain Yow	(England) Mohamed El Shorbagy (England) Marwan El Shorbagy (Egypt) Youssef Ibrahim (Egypt) Youssef Soliman
London Squash Classic (England) London, England; Men: World Events – Gold; 32 players – $133,500 −−−−−− Women: World Events – Gold; 32 players – $133,500	2–7 September	(Egypt) Amina Orfi; 11–4, 11–5, 11–6 (8th PSA title)	(Belgium) Nele Coll	(Malaysia) Sivasangari Subramaniam (Japan) Satomi Watanabe	(Wales) Tesni Murphy (England) Jasmine Hutton (Scotland) Georgia Adderley (United States) Olivia Weaver
Brewin Dolphin Excalibur Cup (England) Winchester, England; Men: Challenger 3; 32 players - $3,000	5–7 September	(England) Noah Meredith; 11–9, 11–6, 11–4 (1st PSA title)	(England) James Peach	(England) Jared Carter (England) Robert Downer	(Republic of Ireland) Oisin Logan (England) George Griffiths (Netherlands) Guido Lindner (England) Joe Pannell
HCL Squash Indian Tour #2 (India) Mumbai, India; Men: Challenger 9; 32 players – $9,000 −−−−−− Women: Challenger 9; 32 players – $9,000	8–12 September	(India) Veer Chotrani; 11–6, 11–5, 11–7 (8th PSA title)	(Hong Kong) Wong Chi Him	(Hong Kong) Tang Ming Hong (Hong Kong) Lam Shing Fung	(Egypt) Mahmoud Assal (India) Suraj Chand (Egypt) Seif Shenawy (New Zealand) Elijah Thomas
HCL Squash Indian Tour #2 (India) Mumbai, India; Men: Challenger 9; 32 players – $9,000 −−−−−− Women: Challenger 9; 32 players – $9,000	8–12 September	(India) Tanvi Khanna; 11–9, 11–6, 1–11, 11–8 (4th PSA title)	(Egypt) Amina El Rihany	(India) Akanksha Salunkhe (Hong Kong) Heylie Fung	(Hong Kong) Helen Tang (France) Énora Villard (Egypt) Lojayn Gohary (Malta) Colette Sultana
Helsinki PSA Challenger (Finland) Helsinki, Finland; Men: Challenger 12; 32 players - $12,000	9–13 September	(Brazil) Diego Gobbi; 12–10, 2–11, 11–6, 11–9 (4th PSA title)	(France) Toufik Mekhalfi	(Israel) Daniel Poleshchuk (Scotland) Rory Stewart	(Republic of Ireland) Conor Moran (Republic of Ireland) Sam Buckley (Wales) Owain Taylor (England) Ben Smith
Abbas Family Squash Inspire 9K (United States) Columbia, United States; Women: Challenger 9; 32 players – $9,000	9–13 September	(Egypt) Malak Taha; 9–11, 11–6, 11–6, 12–10 (1st PSA title)	(Norway) Madeleine Hylland	(Egypt) Zeina Zein (Germany) Katerina Tycova	(Malaysia) Wen Li Lai (United States) Laila Sedky (Republic of Ireland) Breanne Flynn (Australia) Alex Haydon
PSA Aramis Club (Belgium) Nimy, Belgium; Men: Challenger 6; 32 players – $6,000	9–13 September	(France) Amir Khaled-Jousselin; 11–4, 11–2, 9–11, 11–6 (1st PSA title)	(England) Heston Malik	(France) Manuel Paquemar (Egypt) Seif Tamer	(Switzerland) Robin Gadola (Canada) Karim Aguib (Egypt) Taha ElShafei (Czech Republic) Jakub Solnický
Assore Joburg Open (South Africa) Johannesburg, South Africa; Men: Challenger 3; 32 players – $3,000 −−−−−− Women: Challenger 3; 16 players – $3,000	10–14 September	(South Africa) Damian Groenewald; 11–8, 11–3, 11–6 (3rd PSA title)	(Egypt) Ziad Thabet	(South Africa) John Anderson (South Africa) Ruan Olivier	(South Africa) Gareth Craigen (Egypt) Omar Bahgat (Egypt) Abdelrahman Lasheen (South Africa) Nathanael Ndebele
Assore Joburg Open (South Africa) Johannesburg, South Africa; Men: Challenger 3; 32 players – $3,000 −−−−−− Women: Challenger 3; 16 players – $3,000	10–14 September	(South Africa) Teagan Russell; 11–0, 11–0, 11–0 (3rd PSA title)	(South Africa) Helena Coetzee	(South Africa) Jordin Phillips (South Africa) Lara Patrick	(Egypt) Judy Rady (South Africa) Elzandri Janse v Rensburg (South Africa) Keschia Scorgie (South Africa) Bianke Pienaar
CIB Egyptian Open (Egypt) Giza, Egypt; Men: World Events – Diamond; 64 players – $366,000 ------ Women: World Events – Diamond; 64 players – $366,000	8–19 September	(Egypt) Mostafa Asal; 11–9, 11–9, 10–12, 11–7 (23rd PSA title)	(Peru) Diego Elías	(Egypt) Karim Gawad (France) Victor Crouin	(Wales) Joel Makin (Egypt) Fares Dessouky (Egypt) Youssef Soliman (England) Jonah Bryant
CIB Egyptian Open (Egypt) Giza, Egypt; Men: World Events – Diamond; 64 players – $366,000 ------ Women: World Events – Diamond; 64 players – $366,000	8–19 September	(Egypt) Hania El Hammamy; 11–6, 11–5, 8–11, 11–4 (16th PSA title)	(Egypt) Amina Orfi	(Egypt) Nouran Gohar (Egypt) Fayrouz Aboelkheir	(Egypt) Nour El Sherbini (Malaysia) Sivasangari Subramaniam (Belgium) Tinne Gilis (Belgium) Nele Gilis
Genesee Valley Club Open (United States) Rochester, United States; Women: Challenger 9; 32 players - $9,000	16–20 September	(Egypt) Amina El Rihany; 11–6, 11–5, 8–11, 11–4 (4th PSA title)	(Republic of Ireland) Breanne Flynn	(Norway) Madeleine Hylland (Mexico) Diana García	(Italy) Cristina Tartarone (Poland) Karina Tyma (Germany) Katerina Tycova (Hong Kong) Kirstie Wong
Reliance PSA Challenger (Sri Lanka) Colombo, Sri Lanka; Men: Challenger 6; 32 players – $6,000 −−−−−− Women: Challenger 3; 32 players – $3,000	17–21 September	(Malaysia) Duncan Lee; 6–11, 12–10, 11–4, 11–3 (2nd PSA title)	(Egypt) Omar El Torkey	(Hong Kong) Andes Ling (Egypt) Marwan Assal	(India) Suraj Chand (Malaysia) Addeen Idrakie (Hong Kong) Lam Shing Fung (Egypt) Seif Shenawy
Reliance PSA Challenger (Sri Lanka) Colombo, Sri Lanka; Men: Challenger 6; 32 players – $6,000 −−−−−− Women: Challenger 3; 32 players – $3,000	17–21 September	(Malaysia) Zoe Foo; 11–6, 7–11, 11–6, 13–11 (2nd PSA title)	(Indonesia) Raifa Yattaqi	(Egypt) Mona Tamer (Sri Lanka) Chanithma Sinaly	(India) Anjali Semwal (Japan) Ryoko Kadota (Malaysia) Haneesha Veerakumar (India) Aaradhana Kasturiraj
Budapest Open (Hungary) Budapest, Hungary; Men: World Events – Copper; 32 players – $32,000	20–24 September	(Scotland) Greg Lobban; 11–6, 11–5, 11–9 (16th PSA title)	(England) Patrick Rooney	(Japan) Ryūnosuke Tsukue (Switzerland) Yannick Wilhelmi	(Hungary) Balázs Farkas (Portugal) Rui Soares (South Africa) Dewald van Niekerk (England) George Parker
NASH Cup (Canada) London, Canada; Men: World Events – Copper; 32 players – $31,250 −−−−−− Women: World Events – Copper; 32 players – $31,250	23–27 September	(Pakistan) Noor Zaman; 19–17, 11–7, 11–9 (4th PSA title)	(Egypt) Moustafa El Sirty	(Pakistan) Ashab Irfan (Colombia) Matías Knudsen	(India) Veer Chotrani (France) Melvil Scianimanico (England) Sam Todd (Colombia) Ronald Palomino
NASH Cup (Canada) London, Canada; Men: World Events – Copper; 32 players – $31,250 −−−−−− Women: World Events – Copper; 32 players – $31,250	23–27 September	(Hong Kong) Chan Sin Yuk; 11–9, 14–12, 11–9 (10th PSA title)	(United States) Sabrina Sobhy	(England) Torrie Malik (France) Marie Stephan	(England) Saran Nghiem (Canada) Hollie Naughton (Egypt) Nardine Garas (England) Lucy Beecroft
II SPAC Men's Open (Brazil) São Paulo, Brazil; Men: Challenger 6; 32 players – $6,000	23–27 September	(United States) Nicholas Spizzirri; 7–11, 11–4, 11–7, 11–4 (2nd PSA title)	(Colombia) Andrés Herrera	(Colombia) Edgar Ramírez (Paraguay) Francesco Marcantonio	(Colombia) José Santamaría (United States) Christopher Gordon (Ecuador) Álvaro Buenaño (Brazil) Pedro Mometto
II SPAC Women's Open (Brazil) São Paulo, Brazil; Women: Challenger 6; 16 players – $6,000	24–27 September	(South Africa) Hayley Ward; 11–7, 11–8, 11–7 (3rd PSA title)	(Mexico) Diana García	(Brazil) Laura Silva (Colombia) Laura Tovar	(Ecuador) Caridad Buenaño (France) Ana Munos (Paraguay) Fiorella Gatti (Brazil) Luiza Carbonieri
Jack Fairs Open (Canada) London, Canada; Men: Challenger 3; 32 players – $3,000	24–27 September	(Canada) Wasey Maqsood; 4–11, 7–11, 11–5, 11–5, 11–5 (2nd PSA title)	(Canada) Connor Turk	(Canada) Liam Marrison (Canada) Abbas Nawaz	(Bermuda) Taylor Carrick (Canada) Mohammadreza Jafarzadeh (Canada) Elliott Hunt (Canada) Maximilien Godbout
Stourbridge Open (England) Stourbridge, England; Men: Challenger 3; 32 players – $3,000 −−−−−− Women: Challenger 3; 32 players – $3,000	24–28 September	(Republic of Ireland) Conor Moran; 11–3, 11–6, 11–4 (1st PSA title)	(England) Caleb Boy	(Australia) Bradley Fullick (India) Ayaan Vaziralli	(England) Abdallah Eissa (France) Laouenan Loaëc (Denmark) Theis Houlberg (Poland) Jakub Pytlowany
Stourbridge Open (England) Stourbridge, England; Men: Challenger 3; 32 players – $3,000 −−−−−− Women: Challenger 3; 32 players – $3,000	24–28 September	(England) Asia Harris; 11–7, 9–11, 11–1, 6–11, 11–7 (4th PSA title)	(Wales) Ellie Breach	(England) Mariam Eissa (Scotland) Ellie Jones	(England) Polly Clark (Slovenia) Pika Rupar (Singapore) Wai Lynn Au Yeong (Netherlands) Juliette Permentier
2nd Open International XO Conseil Quimper (France) Quimper, France; Men: Challenger 3; 24 players – $3,000	24–28 September	(France) Amir Khaled-Jousselin; 7–11, 11–7, 11–2, 7–11, 11–9 (2nd PSA title)	(Egypt) Taha ElShafei	(Scotland) John Meehan (Poland) Leon Krysiak	(France) Noa Yulzari (France) Antonin Romieu (France) Floris Dupuy-Constant (France) Axel Daujon
HCL Squash Indian Tour #3 (India) Bengaluru, India; Men: Challenger 6; 32 players – $6,000 −−−−−− Women: Challenger 6; 32 players – $6,000	26–30 September	(Egypt) Omar El Torkey; 11–8, 11–8, 11–4 (5th PSA title)	(Egypt) Seif Shenawy	(Sri Lanka) Ravindu Laksiri (India) Suraj Chand	(Egypt) Seif Refaay (India) Om Semwal (Netherlands) Sebastiaan Hofman (Malaysia) Hafiz Abdul Harif
HCL Squash Indian Tour #3 (India) Bengaluru, India; Men: Challenger 6; 32 players – $6,000 −−−−−− Women: Challenger 6; 32 players – $6,000	26–30 September	(Egypt) Menna Walid; 11–6, 11–5, 6–11, 11–8 (5th PSA title)	(Malaysia) Harleein Tan	(Malaysia) Zoe Foo (India) Anjali Semwal	(Malaysia) Rui Jean Yek (India) Nirupama Dubey (India) Shameena Riaz (India) Sanya Vats
KCC PSA Challenge Cup; Hong Kong, China; Men: Challenger 6; 32 players – $6,000 −−−−−− Women: Challenger 6; 32 players – $6,000	29 Sep. – 3 Oct.	(Hong Kong) Wong Chi Him; 11–3, 11–3, 11–4 (11th PSA title)	(Hong Kong) Leo Chung	(Hong Kong) Andes Ling (Hong Kong) Tang Ming Hong	(Hong Kong) Ho Ka Hei (Hong Kong) Harley Lam (South Korea) Ryu Jeong-min (Hong Kong) Lam Shing Fung
KCC PSA Challenge Cup; Hong Kong, China; Men: Challenger 6; 32 players – $6,000 −−−−−− Women: Challenger 6; 32 players – $6,000	29 Sep. – 3 Oct.	(Hong Kong) Heylie Fung; 11–7, 7–11, 13–11, 11–8 (3rd PSA title)	(Egypt) Jana Swaify	(Hong Kong) Ena Kwong (Hong Kong) Kirstie Wong	(Hong Kong) Bobo Lam (South Korea) Song Chae-won (Macau) Gigi Yeung (Hong Kong) Wai Sze Wing
Philippine Challenger Classic (Philippines) Manila, Philippines; Men: Challenger 3; 32 players – $3,000	29 Sep. – 3 Oct.	(Malaysia) Darren Pragasam; 11–9, 11–6, 6–11, 11–7 (5th PSA title)	(Malaysia) N Moganasundharam	(Sri Lanka) Shamil Wakeel (Japan) Shota Yasunari	(Philippines) Reymark Begornia (South Korea) Oh Seo-jin (Philippines) David Pelino (Malaysia) Jia Rong
QTerminals Qatar Classic; Doha, Qatar; Men: World Events – Platinum; 32 players – $231,500 ------ Women: World Events – Platinum; 32 players – $231,500	28 Sep. – 4 Oct.	(New Zealand) Paul Coll; 11–9, 6–11, 11–8, 11–5 (29th PSA title)	(Egypt) Mostafa Asal	(Egypt) Fares Dessouky (England) Jonah Bryant	(Qatar) Abdulla Al-Tamimi (Egypt) Mohamed Abouelghar (Egypt) Youssef Ibrahim (Egypt) Youssef Soliman
QTerminals Qatar Classic; Doha, Qatar; Men: World Events – Platinum; 32 players – $231,500 ------ Women: World Events – Platinum; 32 players – $231,500	28 Sep. – 4 Oct.	(Egypt) Hania El Hammamy; 11–6, 15–13, 11–8 (17th PSA title)	(Egypt) Nour El Sherbini	(Egypt) Amina Orfi (Belgium) Tinne Gilis	(France) Mélissa Alves (Egypt) Farida Mohamed (Malaysia) Sivasangari Subramaniam (Malaysia) Aira Azman
Charlottesville Open (United States) Charlottesville, United States; Men: World Events – Copper; 32 players - $31,250	30 Sep. – 4 Oct.	(United States) Timothy Brownell; 11–6, 10–12, 11–9, 11–3 (17th PSA title)	(Egypt) Salman Khalil	(Pakistan) Noor Zaman (England) Sam Todd	(India) Velavan Senthilkumar (India) Veer Chotrani (Egypt) Yahya Elnawasany (Argentina) Leandro Romiglio

=== October ===
Tournament	Date	Champion	Runner-Up	Semifinalists	Quarterfinalists
Simply the Brest Open (France) Brest, France; Men: Challenger 12; 32 players – $12,000	1–5 October	(France) Toufik Mekhalfi; 8–11, 11–6, 14–12, 11–6 (4th PSA title)	(France) Edwin Clain	(Republic of Ireland) Sam Buckley (Switzerland) David Bernet	(France) Macéo Lévy (Egypt) Hazem Hossam (France) Brice Nicolas (Switzerland) Louai Hafez
Palo Alto Open (United States) Stanford, United States; Women: Challenger 6; 32 players – $6,000	1–5 October	(Egypt) Amina El Rihany; 11–5, 11–8, 11–6 (5th PSA title)	(United States) Laila Sedky	(Malaysia) Goh Zhi Xuan (United States) Madison Ho	(Mexico) Diana García (England) Amelie Haworth (United States) Charlotte Sze (United States) Riya Navani
Open Squash Classic (United States) New York City, United States; Men: World Events – Bronze; 32 players – $74,000 −−−−−− Women: World Events – Bronze; 32 players – $74,000	5–9 October	(France) Victor Crouin; 11–5, 11–5, 11–4 (21st PSA title)	(Mexico) Leonel Cárdenas	(France) Melvil Scianimanico (Malaysia) Eain Yow	(Pakistan) Noor Zaman (England) Nick Wall (Colombia) Miguel Á Rodríguez (England) Adrian Waller
Open Squash Classic (United States) New York City, United States; Men: World Events – Bronze; 32 players – $74,000 −−−−−− Women: World Events – Bronze; 32 players – $74,000	5–9 October	(Egypt) Fayrouz Aboelkheir; 11–4, 10–12, 11–8, 11–6 (5th PSA title)	(Egypt) Nada Abbas	(Egypt) Farida Mohamed (Egypt) Malak Khafagy	(Egypt) Salma Hany (Scotland) Georgia Adderley (England) Lucy Beecroft (England) Lucy Turmel
Wakefield PSA Open (United States) The Plains, United States; Men: Challenger 6; 16 players – $6,000	8–11 October	(United States) Nicholas Spizzirri; 11–5, 13–11, 9–11, 11–6 (3rd PSA title)	(Colombia) Juan Irisarri	(Malaysia) Joachim Chuah (United States) Salim Khan	(South Africa) Callan Hall (United States) Spencer Lovejoy (Chile) Matías Lacroix (Mexico) César Segundo
Japan Open; Yokohama, Japan; Men: Challenger 15; 32 players – $15,000 −−−−−− Women: Challenger 15; 32 players – $15,000	9–13 October	(England) Sam Osborne-Wylde; 11–6, 12–10, 11–5 (4th PSA title)	(Malaysia) Duncan Lee	(Egypt) Yassin Shohdy (Hong Kong) Henry Leung	(Netherlands) Rowan Damming (Egypt) Ibrahim Elkabbani (Japan) Ryūnosuke Tsukue (Malaysia) Addeen Idrakie
Japan Open; Yokohama, Japan; Men: Challenger 15; 32 players – $15,000 −−−−−− Women: Challenger 15; 32 players – $15,000	9–13 October	(India) Joshna Chinappa; 11–5, 11–9, 6–11, 11–8 (11th PSA title)	(Egypt) Haya Ali	(Hong Kong) Tong Tsz Wing (Egypt) Rana Ismail	(Hong Kong) Bobo Lam (Egypt) Nour Khafagy (Egypt) Nardine Garas (Japan) Risa Sugimoto
Silicon Valley Open (United States) Redwood City, United States; Men: World Events – Gold; 32 players – $130,500 −−−−−− Women: World Events – Gold; 32 players – $130,500	11–15 October	(Egypt) Karim Gawad; 11–3, 2–11, 11–5, 12–10 (31st PSA title)	(France) Victor Crouin	(Egypt) Mostafa Asal (Egypt) Kareem El Torkey	(Egypt) Aly Abou Eleinen (England) Curtis Malik (England) Jonah Bryant (France) Baptiste Masotti
Silicon Valley Open (United States) Redwood City, United States; Men: World Events – Gold; 32 players – $130,500 −−−−−− Women: World Events – Gold; 32 players – $130,500	11–15 October	(United States) Olivia Weaver; 12–10, 4–11, 11–4, 11–4 (11th PSA title)	(Malaysia) Sivasangari Subramaniam	(Egypt) Salma Hany (England) Georgina Kennedy	(Japan) Satomi Watanabe (United States) Amanda Sobhy (Egypt) Sana Ibrahim (Egypt) Malak Khafagy
HKS PSA Challenge Cup; Hong Kong, China; Men: Challenger 3; 32 players - $3,000 −−−−−− Women: Challenger 3; 16 players - $3,000	14–18 October	(Hong Kong) Leo Chung; 11–6, 11–6, 11–5 (1st PSA title)	(Hong Kong) Ho Ka Hei	(Hong Kong) Harley Lam (Hong Kong) Andes Ling	(Hong Kong) Tommy Tam (Individual Neutral Athletes) Makar Esin (Malaysia) N Moganasundharam (Hong Kong) Lap Man Au
HKS PSA Challenge Cup; Hong Kong, China; Men: Challenger 3; 32 players - $3,000 −−−−−− Women: Challenger 3; 16 players - $3,000	14–18 October	(Hong Kong) Armona Cheung; 11–5, 11–5, 11–6 (1st PSA title)	(Hong Kong) Bobo Lam	(Malaysia) Zoe Foo (Macau) Gigi Yeung	(Japan) Kurumi Takahashi (Hong Kong) Chloe Lo (Hong Kong) Elaine Chung (Hong Kong) Chiu Hau Ching
Richardson Wealth Men's Open (Canada) Vancouver, Canada; Men: World Events – Copper; 32 players – $31,250	15–19 October	(Pakistan) Ashab Irfan; 11–9, 11–1, 11–5 (7th PSA title)	(England) Sam Todd	(Egypt) Yahya Elnawasany (England) Adrian Waller	(Pakistan) Noor Zaman (England) Tom Walsh (Israel) Daniel Poleshchuk (Egypt) Mohamed Sharaf
Tennis & Racquet Club Boston Open (United States) Boston, United States; Women: Challenger 15; 32 players – $15,000	15–19 October	(Hong Kong) Chan Sin Yuk; 11–8, 11–3, 11–8 (11th PSA title)	(United States) Caroline Fouts	(England) Saran Nghiem (Egypt) Jana Swaify	(India) Anahat Singh (Egypt) Nadine Shahin (France) Kara Lincou (Switzerland) Ambre Allinckx
Cairns Squash International (Australia) Cairns, Australia; Men: Challenger 6; 32 players - $6,000 −−−−−− Women: Challenger 6; 32 players - $6,000	15–19 October	(Japan) Naoki Hayashi; 10–12, 11–7, 4–11, 11–8, 13–11 (1st PSA title)	(Hong Kong) Lam Shing Fung	(Australia) Oscar Curtis (Hong Kong) Tang Ming Hong	(Australia) Nicholas Calvert (Australia) Cameron Darton (Australia) Javed Ali (Australia) Thomas Scott
Cairns Squash International (Australia) Cairns, Australia; Men: Challenger 6; 32 players - $6,000 −−−−−− Women: Challenger 6; 32 players - $6,000	15–19 October	(Hong Kong) Ena Kwong; 11–9, 11–9, 11–7 (1st PSA title)	(Malaysia) Harleein Tan	(Australia) Sarah Cardwell (Canada) Iman Shaheen	(Australia) Lee Sze Yu (Australia) Rachael Grinham (Australia) Hannah Slyth (Egypt) Lojayn Gohary
Lausanne Open (Switzerland) Lausanne, Switzerland; Men: Challenger 6; 32 players – $6,000 −−−−−− Women: Challenger 6; 32 players - $6,000	15–19 October	(France) Amir Khaled-Jousselin; 11–5, 7–11, 11–7, 11–8 (3rd PSA title)	(Czech Republic) Viktor Byrtus	(Switzerland) Louai Hafez (France) Benjamin Aubert	(South Africa) Dewald van Niekerk (Czech Republic) Martin Štěpán (France) Laouenan Loaëc (Netherlands) Sebastiaan Hofman
Lausanne Open (Switzerland) Lausanne, Switzerland; Men: Challenger 6; 32 players – $6,000 −−−−−− Women: Challenger 6; 32 players - $6,000	15–19 October	(England) Asia Harris; 11–9, 11–8, 11–5 (5th PSA title)	(Poland) Karina Tyma	(Poland) Sofi Zrazhevska (Malaysia) Yasshmita Jadishkumar	(France) Ana Munos (Australia) Sophie Fadaely (Switzerland) Céline Walser (Portugal) Catarina Nunes
La Classique de Gatineau (Canada) Gatineau, Canada; Men: Challenger 3; 16 players – $3,000	16–19 October	(Canada) Youssef Sarhan; 11–9, 11–8, 11–5 (1st PSA title)	(Canada) Maximilien Godbout	(Canada) Will Harris (Nigeria) Babatunde Ajagbe	(Canada) Abbas Nawaz (Bermuda) Taylor Carrick (Canada) Marat Sargsyan (Canada) Kent Rawlins
The Hamilton Open (United States) Lancaster, United States; Women: Challenger 15; 32 players – $15,000	20–24 October	(Hong Kong) Chan Sin Yuk; 7–11, 6–11, 11–4, 11–2, 11–6 (12th PSA title)	(Ukraine) Alina Bushma	(Egypt) Nadien Elhammamy (France) Énora Villard	(Egypt) Nadine Shahin (England) Alicia Mead (Australia) Jessica van der Walt (Barbados) Margot Prow
Comcast Business U.S. Open (United States) Philadelphia, United States; Men: World Events – Platinum; 32 players – $226,000 −−−−−− Women: World Events – Platinum; 32 players – $226,000	19–25 October	(Egypt) Mostafa Asal; 11–9, 11–3, 11–3 (24th PSA title)	(New Zealand) Paul Coll	(Egypt) Youssef Ibrahim (Egypt) Karim Gawad	(Egypt) Mohamed Zakaria (Wales) Joel Makin (England) Curtis Malik (France) Baptiste Masotti
Comcast Business U.S. Open (United States) Philadelphia, United States; Men: World Events – Platinum; 32 players – $226,000 −−−−−− Women: World Events – Platinum; 32 players – $226,000	19–25 October	(Egypt) Hania El Hammamy; 11–9, 12–10, 12–10 (18th PSA title)	(Egypt) Amina Orfi	(Egypt) Nour El Sherbini (United States) Olivia Weaver	(Belgium) Tinne Gilis (Egypt) Sana Ibrahim (Japan) Satomi Watanabe (United States) Amanda Sobhy
Swiss Open (Switzerland) Uster, Switzerland; Men: Challenger 12; 32 players – $12,000 −−−−−− Women: Challenger 6; 32 players – $6,000	22–26 October	(Netherlands) Rowan Damming; 11–5, 11–7, 11–4 (8th PSA title)	(Switzerland) David Bernet	(Egypt) Yassin Shohdy (Wales) Rhys Evans	(France) Macéo Lévy (Republic of Ireland) Conor Moran (England) Will Salter (Egypt) Seif Tamer
Swiss Open (Switzerland) Uster, Switzerland; Men: Challenger 12; 32 players – $12,000 −−−−−− Women: Challenger 6; 32 players – $6,000	22–26 October	(Malaysia) Yasshmita Jadishkumar; 11–5, 12–10, 11–7 (4th PSA title)	(Egypt) Ruqayya Salem	(Switzerland) Céline Walser (England) Isabel McCullough	(Australia) Sophie Fadaely (Switzerland) Nadia Pfister (Hong Kong) Wai Sze Wing (France) Rose Lucas-Marcuzzo
China Squash Tour #3; Shanghai, China; Men: Challenger 3; 16 players – $3,000 −−−−−− Women: Challenger 3; 16 players – $3,000	24–26 October	(Hong Kong) Leo Chung; 12–10, 11–4, 11–6 (2nd PSA title)	(Hong Kong) Tang Ming Hong	(Hong Kong) Lap Man Au (Hong Kong) Tommy Tam	(Hong Kong) Andes Ling (Hong Kong) Larry Wong (Hong Kong) Mak Tsun Hei (Hong Kong) Wilson Chan
China Squash Tour #3; Shanghai, China; Men: Challenger 3; 16 players – $3,000 −−−−−− Women: Challenger 3; 16 players – $3,000	24–26 October	(Malaysia) Zoe Foo — (3rd PSA title)	(Macau) Gigi Yeung		
Czech Open (Czech Republic) Brno, Czech Republic; Men: World Events – Copper; 32 players – $33,500	23–27 October	(Switzerland) Yannick Wilhelmi; 11–3, 7–11, 6–11, 11–6, 11–7 (7th PSA title)	(England) Declan James	(Hungary) Balázs Farkas (England) Sam Osborne-Wylde	(England) Patrick Rooney (England) George Parker (Scotland) Rory Stewart (Argentina) Leandro Romiglio
Women: Challenger 9; 32 players – $9,000	23–27 October	(Egypt) Jana Safy; 6–11, 11–9, 11–5, 11–8 (1st PSA title)	(South Africa) Hayley Ward	(Poland) Sofi Zrazhevska (Hong Kong) Kirstie Wong	(Egypt) Nour Megahed (Japan) Akari Midorikawa (Poland) Karina Tyma (Japan) Risa Sugimoto
Canadian Women's Open (Canada) Toronto, Canada; Women: World Events – Silver; 32 players – $96,250	25–30 October	(Egypt) Amina Orfi; 11–8, 11–7, 11–3 (9th PSA title)	(England) Georgina Kennedy	(India) Anahat Singh (United States) Amanda Sobhy	(Canada) Hollie Naughton (Belgium) Tinne Gilis (Wales) Tesni Murphy (Egypt) Nardine Garas
Toronto Athletic Club Open (Canada) Toronto, Canada; Men: World Events – Copper; 32 players – $41,250	25–30 October	(Mexico) Leonel Cárdenas; 11–9, 11–9, 11–6 (18th PSA title)	(Egypt) Yahya Elnawasany	(Egypt) Moustafa El Sirty (England) Sam Todd	(England) Perry Malik (Japan) Ryūnosuke Tsukue (Egypt) Mohamed Sharaf (Egypt) Mohamed Nasser
5ème Open de Lagord (France) Lagord, France; Men: Challenger 15; 32 players – $15,000	28 Oct.–1 Nov.	(Egypt) Yassin ElShafei; 11–8, 9–11, 11–6, 11–5 (9th PSA title)	(France) Toufik Mekhalfi	(Wales) Emyr Evans (Malaysia) Sanjay Jeeva	(France) Edwin Clain (Republic of Ireland) Sam Buckley (Switzerland) David Bernet (Hong Kong) Henry Leung
RGSA Open (Brazil) São Caetano do Sul, Brazil; Men: Challenger 3; 16 players – $3,000	29 Oct.–1 Nov.	(Brazil) Pedro Mometto; 11–3, 11–13, 11–2, 11–8 (2nd PSA title)	(Brazil) Guilherme Melo	(Brazil) Rhuan Souza (Brazil) Murilo Penteado	(Brazil) Vinicius Berbel (Brazil) Isaías Silva (Brazil) Matheus Carbonieri (Brazil) Gustavo Pizatto
PSA Challenger Pierre & Vacances (Andorra) Les Escaldes, Andorra; Women: Challenger 12; 32 players – $12,000	28 Oct.–2 Nov.	(Egypt) Ruqayya Salem; 11–9, 11–8, 9–11, 6–11, 11–8 (1st PSA title)	(Egypt) Nour Khafagy	(South Africa) Hayley Ward (England) Millie Tomlinson	(India) Tanvi Khanna (Hong Kong) Toby Tse (Hong Kong) Helen Tang (Germany) Katerina Tycova
PSA Andorra Challenger; Les Escaldes, Andorra; Men: Challenger 6; 16 players – $6,000	29 Oct.–2 Nov.	(France) Macéo Lévy; 6–11, 9–11, 11–7, 12–10, 11–7 (2nd PSA title)	(Spain) Edmon López	(Spain) Iván Pérez (Wales) Rhys Evans	(England) James Peach (Finland) Henrik Mustonen (Austria) Aqeel Rehman (England) Noah Meredith
3ème Open PSA Féminin de Couzeix/Limoges (France) Couzeix, France; Women: Challenger 15; 32 players – $15,000	29 Oct.–2 Nov.	(France) Lauren Baltayan; 11–5, 11–9, 3–11, 9–11, 11–8 (5th PSA title)	(Egypt) Nadien Elhammamy	(England) Asia Harris (Egypt) Hana Ismail	(England) Lucy Turmel (England) Grace Gear (England) Isabel McCullough (Scotland) Alison Thomson
North Coast Open (Australia) Korora, Australia; Men: Challenger 6; 32 players – $6,000 −−−−−− Women: Challenger 6; 32 players – $6,000	29 Oct.–2 Nov.	(Egypt) Omar El Torkey; 11–8, 11–6, 11–6 (6th PSA title)	(Malaysia) Syafiq Kamal	(Australia) Nicholas Calvert (Hong Kong) Lap Man Au	(Australia) Cameron Darton (Malta) Kijan Sultana (Malaysia) Duncan Lee (Australia) Benjamin Ratcliffe
North Coast Open (Australia) Korora, Australia; Men: Challenger 6; 32 players – $6,000 −−−−−− Women: Challenger 6; 32 players – $6,000	29 Oct.–2 Nov.	(Hong Kong) Ena Kwong; 11–8, 6–4^{rtd.} (2nd PSA title)	(Egypt) Lojayn Gohary	(India) Rathika Seelan (Australia) Sarah Cardwell	(Hong Kong) Bobo Lam (Canada) Iman Shaheen (Australia) Sarbani Maitra (Australia) Remashree Muniandy

=== November ===
Tournament	Date	Champion	Runner-Up	Semifinalists	Quarterfinalists
Andorra Open; Les Escaldes, Andorra; Men: World Events – Copper; 32 players – $31,500	4–8 November	(Spain) Iván Pérez; 11–9, 3–11, 11–3, 11–8 (7th PSA title)	(France) Grégoire Marche	(Switzerland) Yannick Wilhelmi (England) Patrick Rooney	(Spain) Edmon López (Argentina) Leandro Romiglio (Pakistan) Asim Khan (Colombia) Matías Knudsen
Arrayanes Country Club Open (Ecuador) Puembo, Ecuador; Men: Challenger 6; 32 players - $6,000 −−−−−− Women: Challenger 6; 16 players – $6,000	4–8 November	(England) Yusuf Sheikh; 9–11, 11–5, 9–11, 11–3, 11–6 (1st PSA title)	(Egypt) Eiad Daoud	(Brazil) Guilherme Melo (Colombia) Edgar Ramírez	(Colombia) Sebastián Rodríguez (Ecuador) Martín Falconí (United States) Christopher Gordon (Guatemala) Sebastián Fonseca
Arrayanes Country Club Open (Ecuador) Puembo, Ecuador; Men: Challenger 6; 32 players - $6,000 −−−−−− Women: Challenger 6; 16 players – $6,000	4–8 November	(Egypt) Talia Zakaria; 11–6, 11–5, 11–8 (1st PSA title)	(Ecuador) Caridad Buenaño	(Colombia) Luciana Martínez (Brazil) Laura Silva	(Egypt) Ritaj Gomaa (Ecuador) Ariana Álava (Mexico) Camila Viveros (Colombia) María Tovar
St. James Expression Open (United States) Springfield, United States; Men: World Events – Copper; 32 players - $32,000 −−−−−− Women: World Events – Copper; 32 players - $32,000	5–9 November	(Mexico) Leonel Cárdenas; 13–11, 4–11, 11–4, 11–3 (19th PSA title)	(India) Veer Chotrani	(United States) Timothy Brownell (Argentina) Jeremías Azaña	(United States) Shahjahan Khan (Egypt) Mohamed ElSherbini (Egypt) Salman Khalil (Japan) Ryūnosuke Tsukue
St. James Expression Open (United States) Springfield, United States; Men: World Events – Copper; 32 players - $32,000 −−−−−− Women: World Events – Copper; 32 players - $32,000	5–9 November	(United States) Sabrina Sobhy; 11–3, 11–7, 11–13, 11–6 (6th PSA title)	(Hong Kong) Chan Sin Yuk	(England) Lucy Beecroft (Egypt) Habiba Hani	(Egypt) Zeina Zein (Ukraine) Alina Bushma (Norway) Madeleine Hylland (Egypt) Hana Moataz
Bern Squash Open (Switzerland) Kehrsatz, Switzerland; Men: Challenger 12; 32 players – $12,000 −−−−−− Women: Challenger 12; 32 players – $12,000	5–9 November	(Switzerland) David Bernet; 9–11, 16–14, 11–7, 6–11, 11–7 (3rd PSA title)	(France) Toufik Mekhalfi	(Republic of Ireland) Sam Buckley (Egypt) Marwan Assal	(Egypt) Shady El Sherbiny (New Zealand) Elijah Thomas (Netherlands) Sebastiaan Hofman (England) Will Salter
Bern Squash Open (Switzerland) Kehrsatz, Switzerland; Men: Challenger 12; 32 players – $12,000 −−−−−− Women: Challenger 12; 32 players – $12,000	5–9 November	(Egypt) Jana Swaify; 11–2, 12–14, 11–4, 11–13, 11–7 (2nd PSA title)	(Egypt) Menna Walid	(Hong Kong) Toby Tse (England) Asia Harris	(Germany) Saskia Beinhard (Poland) Karina Tyma (Egypt) Nour Megahed (Switzerland) Céline Walser
Kelowna Open (Canada) Kelowna, Canada; Men: Challenger 9; 32 players - $9,000	5–9 November	(Malaysia) Joachim Chuah; 11–9, 11–3, 11–0 (3rd PSA title)	(United States) Nicholas Spizzirri	(Egypt) Mohamed Nasser (Guatemala) Josué Enríquez	(Nigeria) Onaopemipo Adegoke (United States) Bransten Ming (Republic of Ireland) Aaron Allpress (Ecuador) Javier Romo
Alto NSW Open (Australia) Thornleigh, Australia; Men: Challenger 6; 32 players – $6,000 −−−−−− Women: Challenger 3; 32 players – $3,000	5–9 November	(Egypt) Omar El Torkey; 11–5, 11–7, 11–5 (7th PSA title)	(Malaysia) Syafiq Kamal	(Australia) Cameron Darton (Australia) Thomas Scott	(Australia) Benjamin Ratcliffe (Australia) Nicholas Calvert (New Zealand) Freddie Jameson (Hong Kong) Lam Shing Fung
Alto NSW Open (Australia) Thornleigh, Australia; Men: Challenger 6; 32 players – $6,000 −−−−−− Women: Challenger 3; 32 players – $3,000	5–9 November	(Canada) Iman Shaheen; 11–8, 11–3, 4–11, 10–12, 12–10 (1st PSA title)	(India) Rathika Seelan	(New Zealand) Emma Merson (New Zealand) Maiden-Lee Coe	(Australia) Lee Sze Yu (Australia) Shona Coxsedge (Australia) Karen Bloom (Australia) Hannah Slyth
MARIGOLD-SGCC Singapore Challenger; Serangoon, Singapore; Men: Challenger 3; 32 players – $3,000 −−−−−− Women: Challenger 3; 32 players – $3,000	6–9 November	(Hong Kong) Tang Ming Hong; 12–10, 13–11, 11–8 (6th PSA title)	(Singapore) Jerome Aw	(Malaysia) Tay Jun Qian (Singapore) Aaron Liang	(Malaysia) Darren Pragasam (Singapore) Samuel Kang (Philippines) Reymark Begornia (Philippines) Christopher Buraga
MARIGOLD-SGCC Singapore Challenger; Serangoon, Singapore; Men: Challenger 3; 32 players – $3,000 −−−−−− Women: Challenger 3; 32 players – $3,000	6–9 November	(Philippines) Jemyca Aribado; 11–9, 12–10, 11–8 (2nd PSA title)	(Egypt) Malak Samir	(Malaysia) Harleein Tan (Malaysia) Haneesha Veerakumar	(Malaysia) Shasmithaa Nityanandan (Egypt) Mona Tamer (Singapore) Naisha Singh (Singapore) Ong Zhe Sim
Monte Carlo Classic (Monaco) Fontvieille, Monaco; Women: World Events – Copper; 32 players – $32,500	10–14 November	(France) Mélissa Alves; 11–5, 11–3, 11–9 (12th PSA title)	(Egypt) Zeina Mickawy	(England) Torrie Malik (England) Millie Tomlinson	(England) Alicia Mead (Germany) Saskia Beinhard (France) Lauren Baltayan (New Zealand) Kaitlyn Watts
Bondi Open (Australia) Bondi Junction, Australia; Men: Challenger 3; 16 players – $3,000 −−−−−− Women: Challenger 3; 16 players – $3,000	12–14 November	(Egypt) Omar El Torkey; 11–3, 11–3, 11–2 (8th PSA title)	(New Zealand) Freddie Jameson	(Australia) Benjamin Ratcliffe (Australia) Thomas Scott	(Egypt) Mahmoud Ahmed (Australia) Caleb Johnson (Australia) Jack Hudson (Australia) Cameron Darton
Bondi Open (Australia) Bondi Junction, Australia; Men: Challenger 3; 16 players – $3,000 −−−−−− Women: Challenger 3; 16 players – $3,000	12–14 November	(India) Rathika Seelan; 11–7, 11–6, 11–7 (2nd PSA title)	(New Zealand) Maiden-Lee Coe	(Australia) Hannah Slyth (Australia) Lee Sze Yu	(New Zealand) Lily Rae (Australia) Shona Coxsedge (Thailand) Anantana Prasertratanakul (Australia) Anna Goodman
Open International Niort-Venise Verte (France) Bessines, France; Men: Challenger 15; 32 players – $15,000	11–15 November	(Malaysia) Sanjay Jeeva; 11–6, 11–9, 11–5 (2nd PSA title)	(England) Ben Smith	(England) Patrick Rooney (Malaysia) Addeen Idrakie	(Egypt) Marwan Assal (Pakistan) Hamza Khan (Wales) Rhys Evans (Switzerland) David Bernet
SACC Costa Rica Open; Pozos, Costa Rica; Men: Challenger 15; 32 players – $15,000 −−−−−− Women: Challenger 15; 32 players – $15,000	11–15 November	(Colombia) Ronald Palomino; 11–9, 14–12, 11–4 (9th PSA title)	(Egypt) Mohamed Sharaf	(England) Tom Walsh (Guatemala) Josué Enríquez	(Mexico) Sebastián Salazar (Guatemala) Alejandro Enríquez (Paraguay) Francesco Marcantonio (Malaysia) Nathan Kueh
SACC Costa Rica Open; Pozos, Costa Rica; Men: Challenger 15; 32 players – $15,000 −−−−−− Women: Challenger 15; 32 players – $15,000	11–15 November	(Egypt) Amina El Rihany; 11–9, 8–11, 7–11, 11–7, 11–7 (6th PSA title)	(Ukraine) Alina Bushma	(Egypt) Habiba Hani (France) Marie Stephan	(Egypt) Barb Sameh (Barbados) Margot Prow (Wales) Lowri Roberts (Colombia) Laura Tovar
BC Open (Canada) West Vancouver, Canada; Men: Challenger 3; 32 players - $3,000	13–15 November	(United States) Bransten Ming; 11–6, 12–10, 11–3 (1st PSA title)	(Hong Kong) Ho Ka Hei	(Canada) Liam Marrison (Chile) Matías Lacroix	(Canada) Youssef Taha (England) Matt Gregory (Canada) Matt Bicknell (Hong Kong) Akifumi Murakami
China Open; Shanghai, China; Men: World Events – Gold; 32 players – $124,500 −−−−−− Women: World Events – Gold; 32 players – $124,500	11–16 November	(Egypt) Mohamed Abouelghar; 11–6, 4–11, 11–9, 7–11, 13–11 (11th PSA title)	(Egypt) Youssef Ibrahim	(Egypt) Mohamed Zakaria (England) Marwan El Shorbagy	(Egypt) Kareem El Torkey (England) Mohamed El Shorbagy (New Zealand) Paul Coll (Egypt) Mostafa Asal
China Open; Shanghai, China; Men: World Events – Gold; 32 players – $124,500 −−−−−− Women: World Events – Gold; 32 players – $124,500	11–16 November	(Egypt) Amina Orfi; 10–12, 11–8, 11–2, 11–5 (10th PSA title)	(Japan) Satomi Watanabe	(Egypt) Hania El Hammamy (United States) Olivia Weaver	(Malaysia) Rachel Arnold (Egypt) Sana Ibrahim (Egypt) Nada Abbas (Egypt) Salma Hany
Chestnut Hill Classic (United States) Philadelphia, United States; Women: World Events – Silver; 32 players – $86,250	17–21 November	(Egypt) Fayrouz Aboelkheir; 11–9, 10–12, 13–11, 11–4 (6th PSA title)	(Egypt) Farida Mohamed	(Belgium) Tinne Gilis (England) Georgina Kennedy	(United States) Marina Stefanoni (Scotland) Georgia Adderley (Egypt) Malak Khafagy (United States) Sabrina Sobhy
Daly College SRFI Indian Open (India) Indore, India; Men: World Events – Bronze; 32 players – $73,500	18–22 November	(Egypt) Mohamed Zakaria; 11–3, 6–11, 2–0^{rtd.} (7th PSA title)	(Egypt) Youssef Soliman	(Switzerland) Yannick Wilhelmi (Egypt) Yahya Elnawasany	(Malaysia) Eain Yow (India) Ramit Tandon (France) Sébastien Bonmalais (India) Velavan Senthilkumar
Women: Challenger 15; 32 players – $15,000	18–22 November	(India) Anahat Singh; 11–8, 11–13, 11–9, 6–11, 11–9 (14th PSA title)	(India) Joshna Chinappa	(Republic of Ireland) Hannah Craig (Egypt) Nadien Elhammamy	(India) Tanvi Khanna (Hong Kong) Cheng Nga Ching (Spain) Sofía Mateos (Germany) Katerina Tycova
Schräglage Squash Open (Germany) Böblingen, Germany; Men: Challenger 6; 32 players – $6,000 −−−−−− Women: Challenger 6; 32 players – $6,000	18–22 November	(France) Macéo Lévy; 9–11, 11–3, 11–4, 11–5 (3rd PSA title)	(Germany) Yannik Omlor	(Switzerland) Robin Gadola (England) Jared Carter	(France) Matteo Carrouget (England) Will Salter (France) Benjamin Aubert (Wales) Elliott Morris Devred
Schräglage Squash Open (Germany) Böblingen, Germany; Men: Challenger 6; 32 players – $6,000 −−−−−− Women: Challenger 6; 32 players – $6,000	18–22 November	(Egypt) Nour Megahed; 11–6, 6–11, 5–11, 11–6, 11–4 (5th PSA title)	(Republic of Ireland) Breanne Flynn	(Egypt) Malak Samir (France) Ana Munos	(Czech Republic) Karolína Šrámková (Malaysia) Chen Yu Jie (Netherlands) Megan van Drongelen (Poland) Sofi Zrazhevska
London Open (England) Camden, England; Men: Challenger 15; 32 players – $15,000 −−−−−− Women: Challenger 15; 32 players – $15,000	19–23 November	(England) George Parker; 11–5, 11–7, 11–7 (8th PSA title)	(England) Perry Malik	(England) Bailey Malik (Wales) Emyr Evans	(Argentina) Jeremías Azaña (Scotland) Rory Stewart (Egypt) Aly Tolba (Republic of Ireland) Sam Buckley
London Open (England) Camden, England; Men: Challenger 15; 32 players – $15,000 −−−−−− Women: Challenger 15; 32 players – $15,000	19–23 November	(Egypt) Nardine Garas; 11–6, 11–4, 11–2 (6th PSA title)	(Malaysia) Yasshmita Jadishkumar	(Australia) Jessica van der Walt (Egypt) Rana Ismail	(England) Millie Tomlinson (Singapore) Au Yeong Wai Yhann (France) Énora Villard (England) Kiera Marshall
CDMX Open Tekae Faltami; Mexico City, Mexico; Men: Challenger 15; 32 players – $15,000	19–23 November	(Mexico) Alfredo Ávila; 5–11, 3–11, 11–4, 11–9, 11–2 (22nd PSA title)	(England) Sam Todd	(Mexico) Sebastián Salazar (Mexico) César Salazar	(Mexico) Jesús Camacho (United States) Salim Khan (United States) Dillon Huang (Mexico) Jorge Gómez
Northwestern Ontario Open (Canada) Thunder Bay, Canada; Men: Challenger 3; 32 players – $3,000	19–23 November	(Canada) Wasey Maqsood; 4–11, 11–3, 11–8, 12–10 (3rd PSA title)	(Canada) Connor Turk	(Canada) Mohammadreza Jafarzadeh (Canada) Youssef Taha	(Canada) Ivo Thiessen (Canada) Shamil Khan (Canada) Ahmed Abdelkader (Canada) Thomas King
Clarence Open (Australia) Hobart, Australia; Men: Challenger 3; 32 players – $3,000	21–23 November	(Japan) Naoki Hayashi; 11–5, 11–5, 11–4 (2nd PSA title)	(Hong Kong) Rain Wong	(Australia) Gianluca Bushell-O'Connor (Australia) Jack Hudson	(Australia) Oscar Curtis (Australia) Benjamin Hudson (New Zealand) Bryce McMullen (Australia) Jamie Pattison
Bahrain Challenger; Isa Town, Bahrain; Men: Challenger 3; 16 players – $3,000	21–24 November	(Egypt) Kareem Badawi; 11–5, 15–13, 11–7 (1st PSA title)	(Kuwait) Seif Heikal	(Iraq) Hasanain Dakheel (Kuwait) Athbi Hamad	(Iraq) Abdullah Hashim (Egypt) Abdelrahman Abdelkhalek (Kuwait) Abdulrahman Almaghrebi (Kuwait) Saleh Altawari
CAS Serena Hotels International (Pakistan) Islamabad, Pakistan; Men: World Events – Copper; 32 players – $37,500	24–28 November	(Pakistan) Noor Zaman; 9–11, 7–11, 11–7, 11–4, 11–8 (5th PSA title)	(Pakistan) Hamza Khan	(Switzerland) David Bernet (Pakistan) Nasir Iqbal	(Egypt) Khaled Labib (Egypt) Karim El Hammamy (Egypt) Moustafa El Sirty (Egypt) Yassin Shohdy
HKFC Squash Open; Hong Kong, China; Men: World Events – Silver; 32 players – $89,000 −−−−−− Women: World Events – Silver; 32 players – $89,000	25–29 November	(Wales) Joel Makin; 11–9, 11–6, 9–11, 11–6 (10th PSA title)	(Egypt) Youssef Ibrahim	(Egypt) Karim Gawad (France) Victor Crouin	(Malaysia) Eain Yow (Egypt) Aly Abou Eleinen (Egypt) Fares Dessouky (Switzerland) Dimitri Steinmann
HKFC Squash Open; Hong Kong, China; Men: World Events – Silver; 32 players – $89,000 −−−−−− Women: World Events – Silver; 32 players – $89,000	25–29 November	(Egypt) Fayrouz Aboelkheir; 11–6, 11–9, 7–11, 11–4 (7th PSA title)	(Malaysia) Sivasangari Subramaniam	(United States) Amanda Sobhy (France) Mélissa Alves	(Egypt) Sana Ibrahim (Malaysia) Rachel Arnold (Hong Kong) Chan Sin Yuk (Malaysia) Aira Azman
White Oaks Cup (Canada) Niagara-on-the-Lake, Canada; Men: World Events – Copper; 32 players – $31,250	25–29 November	(Switzerland) Nicolas Müller; 11–5, 8–11, 11–5, 11–7 (13th PSA title)	(England) Sam Todd	(England) Tom Walsh (England) Finnlay Withington	(France) Melvil Scianimanico (England) Nathan Lake (Egypt) Mohamed Sharaf (England) Simon Herbert
BDO Namibian Open (Namibia) Windhoek, Namibia; Men: Challenger 15; 32 players – $15,000	25–29 November	(South Africa) Dewald van Niekerk; 11–9, 11–7, 13–11 (9th PSA title)	(Egypt) Aly Tolba	(Wales) Rhys Evans (Egypt) Mohamed Gohar	(Germany) Yannik Omlor (Egypt) Abdullah Amr (Austria) Aqeel Rehman (South Africa) Damian Groenewald
Les Elles de l'Est Challenger (France) Maxéville, France; Women: Challenger 6; 32 players – $6,000	25–29 November	(Egypt) Zeina Zein; 11–9, 12–10, 11–4 (5th PSA title)	(New Zealand) Ella Lash	(United States) Caroline Fouts (France) Léa Barbeau	(Scotland) Ellie Jones (France) Ana Munos (Australia) Erin Classen (South Korea) Ryoo Bo-ram
JSW 11th Sunil Verma Memorial Open (India) Vasind, India; Men: Challenger 9; 32 players – $9,000 −−−−−− Women: Challenger 3; 32 players – $3,000	26–30 November	(France) Macéo Lévy; 11–8, 11–8, 11–4 (4th PSA title)	(Egypt) Yassin ElShafei	(Malaysia) Addeen Idrakie (India) Suraj Chand	(India) Gurveer Singh (India) Om Semwal (India) Abhishek Agarwal (Sri Lanka) Ravindu Laksiri
JSW 11th Sunil Verma Memorial Open (India) Vasind, India; Men: Challenger 9; 32 players – $9,000 −−−−−− Women: Challenger 3; 32 players – $3,000	26–30 November	(India) Sanya Vats; 11–6, 11–9, 11–4 (1st PSA title)	(India) Nirupama Dubey	(India) Shameena Riaz (India) Anjali Semwal	(India) Unnati Tripathi (India) Aahana Singh (India) Rathika Seelan (India) Aadya Budhia
Tunbridge Wells Open (England) Royal Tunbridge Wells, England; Men: Challenger 9; 32 players – $9,000	26–30 November	(England) Perry Malik; 11–8, 11–1, 11–5 (1st PSA title)	(England) Ben Smith	(England) Heston Malik (England) Bailey Malik	(France) Edwin Clain (Wales) Emyr Evans (Wales) Owain Taylor (England) Will Salter
Egyptian Squash Federation Open #2 (Egypt) Cairo, Egypt; Men: Challenger 12; 32 players – $12,000 −−−−−− Women: Challenger 12; 32 players – $12,000	27 Nov. – 1 Dec.	(Egypt) Mohamed Nasser; 8–11, 12–10, 11–7, 13–15, 14–12 (4th PSA title)	(Egypt) Ahmed Sobhy	(Egypt) Kareem Badawi (Egypt) Seif Shenawy	(Egypt) Yassin Shohdy (Egypt) Eiad Daoud (Egypt) Ziad Ibrahim (Egypt) Khaled Labib
Egyptian Squash Federation Open #2 (Egypt) Cairo, Egypt; Men: Challenger 12; 32 players – $12,000 −−−−−− Women: Challenger 12; 32 players – $12,000	27 Nov. – 1 Dec.	(Egypt) Jana Swaify; 12–10, 7–11, 11–6, 11–9 (3rd PSA title)	(Egypt) Nadien Elhammamy	(Egypt) Farida Walid (Egypt) Barb Sameh	(Egypt) Nour Khafagy (Egypt) Rana Ismail (Egypt) Ruqayya Salem (Egypt) Menna Walid

=== December ===
Tournament	Date	Champion	Runner-Up	Semifinalists	Quarterfinalists
QSF No.6 (Qatar) Doha, Qatar; Men: Challenger 3; 16 players – $3,000	1–4 December	(Iraq) Hasanain Dakheel; 7–11, 11–5, 11–8, 11–8 (1st PSA title)	(Kuwait) Seif Heikal	(Bahrain) Yusuf Thani (Kuwait) Athbi Hamad	(Iraq) Abdullah Hashim (Qatar) Salem Al-Malki (Kuwait) Bader Almaghrebi (Qatar) Ali Al-Darwish
HCL Squash Indian Tour #4 (India) Chennai, India; Men: Challenger 15; 32 players – $15,000 −−−−−− Women: Challenger 15; 32 players – $15,000	1–5 December	(India) Velavan Senthilkumar; 11–7, 11–9, 9–11, 11–4 (10th PSA title)	(Egypt) Adam Hawal	(France) Macéo Lévy (Brazil) Diego Gobbi	(Egypt) Ibrahim Elkabbani (India) Veer Chotrani (Australia) Joseph White (Israel) Daniel Poleshchuk
HCL Squash Indian Tour #4 (India) Chennai, India; Men: Challenger 15; 32 players – $15,000 −−−−−− Women: Challenger 15; 32 players – $15,000	1–5 December	(India) Anahat Singh; 11–8, 11–13, 11–13, 11–6, 11–8 (15th PSA title)	(India) Joshna Chinappa	(India) Tanvi Khanna (South Africa) Hayley Ward	(Hong Kong) Cheng Nga Ching (Hong Kong) Heylie Fung (Egypt) Nardine Garas (Japan) Akari Midorikawa
Milwaukee Hong Kong Open; Hong Kong, China; Men: World Events – Platinum; 32 players - $224,500 −−−−−− Women: World Events – Platinum; 32 players - $224,500	1–7 December	(Egypt) Mostafa Asal; 11–6, 11–8, 11–6 (25th PSA title)	(Egypt) Youssef Ibrahim	(New Zealand) Paul Coll (England) Jonah Bryant	(Mexico) Leonel Cárdenas (Colombia) Miguel Á Rodríguez (Egypt) Marwan El Shorbagy (France) Victor Crouin
Milwaukee Hong Kong Open; Hong Kong, China; Men: World Events – Platinum; 32 players - $224,500 −−−−−− Women: World Events – Platinum; 32 players - $224,500	1–7 December	(Egypt) Nour El Sherbini; 11–5, 11–5, 11–7 (45th PSA title)	(United States) Olivia Weaver	(Egypt) Hania El Hammamy (Japan) Satomi Watanabe	(Egypt) Amina Orfi (Belgium) Tinne Gilis (Malaysia) Sivasangari Subramaniam (United States) Sabrina Sobhy
Madeira International (Portugal) Caniço, Portugal; Men: Challenger 15; 32 players – $15,000 −−−−−− Women: Challenger 6; 32 players – $6,000	3–7 December	(England) Patrick Rooney; 11–2, 11–3, 11–9 (6th PSA title)	(Scotland) Rory Stewart	(United States) Shahjahan Khan (France) Brice Nicolas	(Argentina) Jeremías Azaña (New Zealand) Lwamba Chileshe (United States) Nicholas Spizzirri (France) Joshua Phinéra
Madeira International (Portugal) Caniço, Portugal; Men: Challenger 15; 32 players – $15,000 −−−−−− Women: Challenger 6; 32 players – $6,000	3–7 December	(Egypt) Farida Walid; 11–5, 2–11, 6–11, 13–11, 11–2 (3rd PSA title)	(Egypt) Menna Walid	(Egypt) Rana Ismail (Republic of Ireland) Breanne Flynn	(Portugal) Catarina Nunes (Japan) Erisa Sano (Czech Republic) Karolína Šrámková (Germany) Maya Weishar
Fountain Tire ESC Winter Open (Canada) Edmonton, Canada; Women: Challenger 6; 16 players – $6,000	4–7 December	(Barbados) Margot Prow; 11–3, 11–8, 6–11, 11–4 (3rd PSA title)	(United States) Laila Sedky	(Republic of Ireland) Hannah Craig (Hong Kong) Helen Tang	(Canada) Niki Shemirani (Canada) Gladys Ho (Egypt) Rouqaia Othman (Belgium) Savannah Moxham
Charlotte Squash Club Challenger (United States) Charlotte, United States; Men: Challenger 3; 16 players – $3,000	5–7 December	(Egypt) Ali El Toukhy; 6–11, 12–10, 11–9, 11–6 (1st PSA title)	(Malaysia) Siow Yee Xian	(United States) Dylan Kachur (Egypt) Mohamed Nawar	(Pakistan) Sami Ullah (United States) Amir Malik (Egypt) Abdelaziz Hegazy (Canada) Will Harris
GWC Open (United States) Cos Cob, United States; Men: Challenger 3; 16 players – $3,000	11–13 December	(Malaysia) Siow Yee Xian; 8–11, 12–10, 11–2, 8–11, 11–8 (1st PSA title)	(India) Abhishek Agarwal	(Hungary) Benedek Takács (Ukraine) Dmytro Shcherbakov	(United States) Christopher Gordon (South Africa) Callan Hall (Mexico) César Segundo (Nigeria) Babatunde Ajagbe
Harrogate Squash Open (England) Harrogate, England; Men: Challenger 3; 32 players – $3,000	11–14 December	(England) Heston Malik; 11–8, 11–9, 12–10 (1st PSA title)	(New Zealand) Lwamba Chileshe	(France) Laouenan Loaëc (England) Will Salter	(Australia) Bradley Fullick (England) Anthony Rogal (England) James Peach (Spain) Hugo Jaén
Liechtenstein Open; Vaduz, Liechtenstein; Men: Challenger 3; 16 players - $3,000	12–14 December	(Austria) Aqeel Rehman; 13–11, 8–11, 12–10, 10–12, 11–8 (16th PSA title)	(Liechtenstein) David Maier	(Austria) Daniel Lutz (Italy) Filippo Conti	(Switzerland) Nick Greter (Switzerland) Silvan Oertli (Switzerland) Miguel Mathis (Germany) Liam Pössl
Georgia Open (United States) Atlanta, United States; Men: Challenger 6; 32 players – $6,000	17–21 December	(Malaysia) Joachim Chuah; 11–7, 11–7, 11–5 (4th PSA title)	(Colombia) Juan José Torres	(South Africa) Callan Hall (Malaysia) Siow Yee Xian	(United States) Bransten Ming (United States) Nicholas Spizzirri (Mexico) Wally de los Santos (Pakistan) Ahsan Ayaz
Effat & Hafez Cairo Int. Squash Base 2 (Egypt) Nasr City, Egypt; Men: Challenger 9; 32 players – $9,000	27–31 December	(Egypt) Yassin Shohdy; 3–11, 13–11, 11–8, 11–9 (7th PSA title)	(Egypt) Ziad Ibrahim	(Egypt) Marwan Assal (Egypt) Seif Tamer	(Egypt) Eiad Daoud (Egypt) Marwan Tamer (England) Yusuf Sheikh (Egypt) Aly Ezzat

=== January ===
Tournament	Date	Champion	Runner-Up	Semifinalists	Quarterfinalists
1st CAS International Squash Open (Bangladesh) Dhaka, Bangladesh; Men: Challenger 12; 32 players – $12,000	2–6 January	(Egypt) Yassin Shohdy; 11–2, 11–9, 11–9 (8th PSA title)	(Malaysia) Duncan Lee	(Pakistan) Asim Khan (Egypt) Seif Tamer	(Egypt) Kareem Badawi (Hong Kong) Wong Chi Him (Japan) Tomotaka Endo (Japan) Naoki Hayashi
Rich Venus Karachi Open (Pakistan) Karachi, Pakistan; Men: World Events – Gold; 32 players – $121,500 −−−−−− Women: World Events – Gold; 32 players – $121,500	6–11 January	(Egypt) Mohamed Zakaria; 9–11, 11–9, 12–14, 11–7, 11–7 (8th PSA title)	(Egypt) Aly Abou Eleinen	(England) Mohamed El Shorbagy (Egypt) Karim Gawad	(Pakistan) Noor Zaman (Malaysia) Eain Yow (England) Marwan El Shorbagy (Hong Kong) Alex Lau
Rich Venus Karachi Open (Pakistan) Karachi, Pakistan; Men: World Events – Gold; 32 players – $121,500 −−−−−− Women: World Events – Gold; 32 players – $121,500	6–11 January	(Egypt) Amina Orfi; 11–8, 11–2, 11–7 (11th PSA title)	(Malaysia) Sivasangari Subramaniam	(Malaysia) Aifa Azman (Egypt) Nada Abbas	(Egypt) Farida Mohamed (Malaysia) Aira Azman (England) Lucy Turmel (Egypt) Fayrouz Aboelkheir
DR21 Motor City Open (United States) Bloomfield Hills, United States; Men: World Events – Silver; 32 players – $90,500	13–17 January	(England) Marwan El Shorbagy; 13–11, 11–5, 11–8 (17th PSA title)	(Peru) Diego Elías	(Switzerland) Dimitri Steinmann (Egypt) Yahya Elnawasany	(Colombia) Miguel Á Rodríguez (Egypt) Karim El Hammamy (United States) Timothy Brownell (India) Ramit Tandon
Squash In The Land (United States) Pepper Pike, United States; Men: World Events – Silver; 32 players – $96,250 −−−−−− Women: World Events – Silver; 32 players – $96,250	13–18 January	(New Zealand) Paul Coll; 11–7, 14–12, 11–4 (30th PSA title)	(Mexico) Leonel Cárdenas	(Scotland) Greg Lobban (France) Grégoire Marche	(Germany) Raphael Kandra (England) Nathan Lake (India) Veer Chotrani (Spain) Bernat Jaume
Squash In The Land (United States) Pepper Pike, United States; Men: World Events – Silver; 32 players – $96,250 −−−−−− Women: World Events – Silver; 32 players – $96,250	13–18 January	(United States) Olivia Weaver; 11–5, 11–2, 11–2 (12th PSA title)	(United States) Sabrina Sobhy	(Belgium) Nele Gilis (England) Jasmine Hutton	(Egypt) Malak Khafagy (England) Lucy Beecroft (United States) Marina Stefanoni (Canada) Hollie Naughton
ESC New Year Open (Canada) Edmonton, Canada; Men: Challenger 6; 32 players – $6,000	14–18 January	(New Zealand) Oliver Dunbar; 13–11, 9–11, 11–8, 8–11, 11–9 (1st PSA title)	(Mexico) Alfredo Ávila	(Mexico) Jorge Gómez (Colombia) Andrés Herrera	(Czech Republic) Martin Štěpán (Egypt) Abdelrahman Nassar (Canada) Wasey Maqsood (Canada) Connor Turk
Egyptian Squash Federation Open #3 (Egypt) Cairo, Egypt; Men: Challenger 9; 32 players – $9,000 −−−−−− Women: Challenger 9; 32 players – $9,000	17–21 January	(Egypt) Marwan Assal; 9–11, 11–6, 5–11, 11–8, 12–10 (1st PSA title)	(Egypt) Adam Hawal	(Egypt) Yassin Shohdy (Egypt) Mohamed Sharaf	(Egypt) Ahmed Sobhy (Egypt) Seif Tamer (Egypt) Shady El Sherbiny (Egypt) Abdullah Hafez
Egyptian Squash Federation Open #3 (Egypt) Cairo, Egypt; Men: Challenger 9; 32 players – $9,000 −−−−−− Women: Challenger 9; 32 players – $9,000	17–21 January	(Egypt) Sohayla Hazem; 6–11, 11–4, 11–8, 3–11, 17–15 (1st PSA title)	(Egypt) Ruqayya Salem	(Egypt) Rouqaia Othman (Egypt) Malak Fathy	(Egypt) Menna Walid (Egypt) Farida Walid (Egypt) Nour Megahed (Egypt) Amira Elrefaey
Gas City Open (Canada) Medicine Hat, Canada; Men: Challenger 6; 32 players - $6,000	21–25 January	(Mexico) Alfredo Ávila; 11–8, 11–4, 11–7 (23rd PSA title)	(Egypt) Abdelrahman Nassar	(Czech Republic) Martin Štěpán (Colombia) Andrés Herrera	(Canada) Wasey Maqsood (Colombia) Mateo Restrepo (Canada) Youssef Taha (Canada) Connor Turk
Squash on Fire Challenge (United States) Washington, D.C., United States; Men: Challenger 3; 32 players – $3,000 −−−−−− Women: Challenger 3; 16 players – $3,000	22–25 January	(Pakistan) Asim Khan; 11–2, 6–11, 11–6, 9–11, 11–6 (12th PSA title)	(Malaysia) Siow Yee Xian	(Egypt) Khaled Labib (Egypt) Ibrahim Elkabbani	(Chile) Matías Lacroix (Egypt) Ziad Ibrahim (Ukraine) Dmytro Shcherbakov (Egypt) Mohamed Nawar
Squash on Fire Challenge (United States) Washington, D.C., United States; Men: Challenger 3; 32 players – $3,000 −−−−−− Women: Challenger 3; 16 players – $3,000	22–25 January	(Egypt) Malak Fathy; 11–9, 11–3, 9–11, 3–11, 11–2 (1st PSA title)	(Spain) Noa Romero	(Mexico) Diana García (Egypt) Rana Ismail	(Ecuador) Caridad Buenaño (Guyana) Mary Fung-A-Fat (Ecuador) Emilia Falconí (Nigeria) Olatunji Busayo
J.P. Morgan Tournament of Champions (United States) New York City, United States; Men: World Events – Platinum; 32 players – $239,000 −−−−−− Women: World Events – Platinum; 32 players – $239,000	22–29 January	(Egypt) Mostafa Asal; 11–6, 11–1, 11–4 (26th PSA title)	(New Zealand) Paul Coll	(Peru) Diego Elías (Egypt) Karim Gawad	(France) Victor Crouin (England) Jonah Bryant (England) Mohamed El Shorbagy (Egypt) Youssef Ibrahim
J.P. Morgan Tournament of Champions (United States) New York City, United States; Men: World Events – Platinum; 32 players – $239,000 −−−−−− Women: World Events – Platinum; 32 players – $239,000	22–29 January	(Egypt) Hania El Hammamy; 11–7, 5–11, 11–9, 5–11, 11–9 (19th PSA title)	(United States) Olivia Weaver	(Egypt) Nour El Sherbini (Egypt) Fayrouz Aboelkheir	(Malaysia) Sivasangari Subramaniam (England) Jasmine Hutton (Egypt) Amina Orfi (Japan) Satomi Watanabe
HCL Squash Indian Tour #5 (India) Ahmedabad, India; Men: Challenger 6; 32 players – $6,000 −−−−−− Women: Challenger 6; 32 players – $6,000	27–31 January	(Egypt) Seif Refaay; 11–4, 11–7, 11–4 (1st PSA title)	(Egypt) Hazem Hossam	(India) Suraj Chand (India) Ayaan Vaziralli	(Egypt) Mohamed Gohar (Hong Kong) Lam Shing Fung (Hong Kong) Lap Man Au (Sri Lanka) Ravindu Laksiri
HCL Squash Indian Tour #5 (India) Ahmedabad, India; Men: Challenger 6; 32 players – $6,000 −−−−−− Women: Challenger 6; 32 players – $6,000	27–31 January	(Egypt) Farida Walid; 9–11, 13–15, 11–8, 12–10, 11–5 (4th PSA title)	(India) Tanvi Khanna	(Malaysia) Sehveetrraa Kumar (Hong Kong) Bobo Lam	(Egypt) Lojayn Gohary (Hong Kong) Ena Kwong (India) Sanya Vats (India) Rathika Seelan
Amsterdam Challenger (Netherlands) Amsterdam, Netherlands; Men: Challenger 3; 32 players – $3,000 −−−−−− Women: Challenger 9; 32 players – $9,000	28–31 January	(Netherlands) Rowan Damming; 7–11, 11–4, 11–4, 11–7 (9th PSA title)	(France) Amir Khaled-Jousselin	(England) Jared Carter (Egypt) Taha ElShafei	(France) Titouan Isambard (Netherlands) Sam Gerrits (Australia) Bradley Fullick (France) Antonin Romieu
Amsterdam Challenger (Netherlands) Amsterdam, Netherlands; Men: Challenger 3; 32 players – $3,000 −−−−−− Women: Challenger 9; 32 players – $9,000	28–31 January	(France) Lauren Baltayan; 11–6, 11–7, 11–7 (6th PSA title)	(Egypt) Nour Khafagy	(Australia) Jessica van der Walt (Barbados) Margot Prow	(Italy) Cristina Tartarone (Scotland) Alison Thomson (Republic of Ireland) Breanne Flynn (Wales) Lowri Roberts
Squash on Fire Open (United States) Washington, D.C., United States; Men: World Events – Bronze; 32 players – $66,000 −−−−−− Women: World Events – Bronze; 32 players – $66,000	28 Jan.–1 Feb.	(England) Mohamed El Shorbagy; 11–4, 11–6, 11–8 (52nd PSA title)	(England) Declan James	(Egypt) Karim El Hammamy (Egypt) Fares Dessouky	(India) Veer Chotrani (Mexico) Leonel Cárdenas (Egypt) Mohamed ElSherbini (Germany) Raphael Kandra
Squash on Fire Open (United States) Washington, D.C., United States; Men: World Events – Bronze; 32 players – $66,000 −−−−−− Women: World Events – Bronze; 32 players – $66,000	28 Jan.–1 Feb.	(India) Anahat Singh; 12–10, 11–5, 11–7 (16th PSA title)	(England) Georgina Kennedy	(France) Mélissa Alves (United States) Sabrina Sobhy	(Egypt) Sana Ibrahim (Egypt) Hana Moataz (Egypt) Jana Swaify (Egypt) Nadien Elhammamy
Mossel Bay Diaz Open (South Africa) Mossel Bay, South Africa; Men: Challenger 3; 16 players – $3,000	29 Jan.–1 Feb.	(Egypt) Ahmed Sobhy; 11–2, 8–11, 11–7, 6–11, 14–12 (1st PSA title)	(South Africa) Damian Groenewald	(Zimbabwe) Ryan Gwidzima (South Africa) John Anderson	(South Africa) Reuel Videler (South Africa) Ruan Olivier (Pakistan) Anas Khan (South Africa) Dean Venter

=== February ===
Tournament	Date	Champion	Runner-Up	Semifinalists	Quarterfinalists
Telsa Media David Lloyd Purley Open (England) Croydon, England; Men: Challenger 3; 16 players – $3,000 −−−−−− Women: Challenger 3; 16 players – $3,000	6–7 February	(England) Noah Meredith; 8–11, 11–8, 10–12, 12–10, 11–6 (2nd PSA title)	(England) Jared Carter	(Scotland) Rory Richmond (Scotland) John Meehan	(Wales) Ioan Sharpe (England) Caleb Boy (England) Anthony Rogal (England) Abdallah Eissa
Telsa Media David Lloyd Purley Open (England) Croydon, England; Men: Challenger 3; 16 players – $3,000 −−−−−− Women: Challenger 3; 16 players – $3,000	6–7 February	(Egypt) Jana Safy; 10–12, 11–1, 11–3, 11–4 (2nd PSA title)	(Japan) Erisa Sano	(England) Kiera Marshall (Malaysia) Chen Yu Jie	(Scotland) Robyn McAlpine (England) Katie Cox (Scotland) Ellie Jones (Wales) Ellie Breach
Bee Squash Expression Open (United States) Springfield, United States; Men: Challenger 3; 32 players – $3,000 −−−−−− Women: Challenger 6; 32 players – $6,000	4–8 February	(Egypt) Omar Azzam; 11–7, 11–7, 10–12, 11–6 (1st PSA title)	(Egypt) Abdelrahman Nassar	(Belgium) Maddox Moxham (South Africa) Luhann Groenewald	(Colombia) Nicolás Serna (France) Laouenan Loaëc (Egypt) Ahmed ElRahim (Ukraine) Valeriy Fedoruk
Bee Squash Expression Open (United States) Springfield, United States; Men: Challenger 3; 32 players – $3,000 −−−−−− Women: Challenger 6; 32 players – $6,000	4–8 February	(Wales) Lowri Roberts; 11–6, 11–6, 11–5 (2nd PSA title)	(United States) Akaisha Bhatia	(United States) Charlotte Sze (United States) Laila Sedky	(Canada) Danielle Ray (Belgium) Savannah Moxham (Ecuador) Emilia Falconí (Germany) Kenzy Abou Eleinen
Brno Open (Czech Republic) Brno, Czech Republic; Men: Challenger 3; 16 players - $3,000 −−−−−− Women: Challenger 3; 16 players - $3,000	8–10 February	(Czech Republic) Jakub Solnický; 11–7, 5–11, 11–7, 8–11, 11–5 (6th PSA title)	(Czech Republic) Marek Panáček	(Czech Republic) Martin Štěpán (Poland) Jan Samborski	(Poland) Mateusz Marcinkowski (Poland) Filip Jarota (Poland) Jakub Pytlowany (Poland) Łukasz Marcinkowski
Brno Open (Czech Republic) Brno, Czech Republic; Men: Challenger 3; 16 players - $3,000 −−−−−− Women: Challenger 3; 16 players - $3,000	8–10 February	(Czech Republic) Karolína Šrámková; 11–6, 11–5, 11–4 (2nd PSA title)	(Poland) Tola Otrząsek	(Czech Republic) Tamara Holzbauerová (Czech Republic) Tereza Široká	(Hungary) Csenge Kiss-Máté (Czech Republic) Aneta Sezemská (Czech Republic) Johana Jedličková (Czech Republic) Kristýna Hrnčiříková
Windy City Open (United States) Chicago, United States; Men: World Events – Platinum; 32 players – $260,000 −−−−−− Women: World Events – Platinum; 32 players – $260,000	5–11 February	(Egypt) Mostafa Asal; 11–5, 12–10, 11–7 (27th PSA title)	(New Zealand) Paul Coll	(France) Grégoire Marche (Egypt) Karim Gawad	(England) Marwan El Shorbagy (England) Mohamed El Shorbagy (France) Victor Crouin (England) Jonah Bryant
Windy City Open (United States) Chicago, United States; Men: World Events – Platinum; 32 players – $260,000 −−−−−− Women: World Events – Platinum; 32 players – $260,000	5–11 February	(Egypt) Nour El Sherbini; 9–11, 10–12, 13–11, 11–5, 11–8 (46th PSA title)	(Egypt) Amina Orfi	(United States) Olivia Weaver (Egypt) Hania El Hammamy	(Malaysia) Sivasangari Subramaniam (Belgium) Tinne Gilis (United States) Amanda Sobhy (Egypt) Fayrouz Aboelkheir
Gimcheon-Si Korea Cup (South Korea) Gimcheon, South Korea; Men: Challenger 6; 16 players - $6,000 −−−−−− Women: Challenger 6; 16 players - $6,000	10–12 February	(Japan) Tomotaka Endo; 12–10, 2–11, 11–8, 11–3 (4th PSA title)	(Hong Kong) Lam Shing Fung	(South Korea) Park Seung-min (Japan) Naoki Hayashi	(Japan) Shota Yasunari (Hong Kong) To Wai Lok (South Korea) Ryu Jeong-min (South Korea) Ji Dong-hyun
Gimcheon-Si Korea Cup (South Korea) Gimcheon, South Korea; Men: Challenger 6; 16 players - $6,000 −−−−−− Women: Challenger 6; 16 players - $6,000	10–12 February	(Hong Kong) Kirstie Wong; 6–11, 11–8, 11–8, 11–6 (4th PSA title)	(Hong Kong) Ena Kwong	(South Korea) Eum Hwa-yeong (South Korea) Heo Min-gyeong	(Hong Kong) Ka Huen Leung (South Korea) Ryoo Bo-ram (South Korea) Song Chae-won (South Korea) Jang Ye-won
Saudi Squash Fed Challenger 1 (Saudi Arabia) Riyadh, Saudi Arabia; Men: Challenger 3; 16 players – $3,000	12–14 February	(Egypt) Kareem Badawi; 11–8, 8–11, 11–6, 11–4 (2nd PSA title)	(Saudi Arabia) Mohammed Nasfan	(Egypt) Seif Heikal (Kuwait) Bader Almaghrebi	(Egypt) Ezz Nasser (Egypt) Abdelrahman Abdelkhalek (Kuwait) Abdulrahman Almaghrebi (Kuwait) Jassim Al-Ghareeb
Texas Open (United States) Houston, United States; Men: World Events – Gold; 32 players – $120,000 −−−−−− Women: World Events – Gold; 32 players – $120,000	12–16 February	(France) Victor Crouin; 9–11, 11–8, 11–5, 11–9 (22nd PSA title)	(Peru) Diego Elías	(England) Marwan El Shorbagy (France) Melvil Scianimanico	(Egypt) Aly Abou Eleinen (Switzerland) Dimitri Steinmann (Pakistan) Ashab Irfan (Egypt) Karim Gawad
Texas Open (United States) Houston, United States; Men: World Events – Gold; 32 players – $120,000 −−−−−− Women: World Events – Gold; 32 players – $120,000	12–16 February	(Egypt) Nour El Sherbini; 13–15, 13–11, 12–14, 11–8, 11–8 (47th PSA title)	(United States) Olivia Weaver	(United States) Marina Stefanoni (England) Georgina Kennedy	(Egypt) Nadien Elhammamy (Egypt) Zeina Mickawy (Scotland) Georgia Adderley (Egypt) Salma Hany
HCL Squash Indian Tour #6 (India) Greater Noida, India; Men: Challenger 6; 32 players – $6,000 −−−−−− Women: Challenger 6; 32 players – $6,000	12–16 February	(Egypt) Abdullah Hafez; 11–6, 11–7, 11–6 (1st PSA title)	(Sri Lanka) Ravindu Laksiri	(India) Suraj Chand (India) Ayaan Vaziralli	(India) Rahul Baitha (Bahrain) Yusuf Thani (Egypt) Yusuf Elsherif (India) Gurveer Singh
HCL Squash Indian Tour #6 (India) Greater Noida, India; Men: Challenger 6; 32 players – $6,000 −−−−−− Women: Challenger 6; 32 players – $6,000	12–16 February	(Egypt) Malak Fathy; 11–8, 8–11, 11–6, 11–4 (2nd PSA title)	(Malaysia) Sehveetrraa Kumar	(India) Tanvi Khanna (Egypt) Menna Walid	(Egypt) Fatema Zohdy (India) Sanya Vats (Egypt) Mona Tamer (Egypt) Lojayn Gohary
Guilfoyle PSA Squash Classic (Canada) Toronto, Canada; Men: Challenger 9; 32 players – $9,000 −−−−−− Women: Challenger 6; 32 players – $6,000	17–21 February	(England) Simon Herbert; 13–11, 11–9, 11–7 (5th PSA title)	(Colombia) Ronald Palomino	(Argentina) Jeremías Azaña (United States) Nicholas Spizzirri	(Mexico) Alfredo Ávila (France) Joshua Phinéra (England) Heston Malik (Malaysia) Nathan Kueh
Guilfoyle PSA Squash Classic (Canada) Toronto, Canada; Men: Challenger 9; 32 players – $9,000 −−−−−− Women: Challenger 6; 32 players – $6,000	17–21 February	(Poland) Karina Tyma; 13–11, 11–6, 11–8 (4th PSA title)	(United States) Laila Sedky	(Barbados) Margot Prow (Colombia) Laura Tovar	(Colombia) Lucía Bautista (Italy) Cristina Tartarone (Canada) Iman Shaheen (Canada) Danielle Ray
Cincinnati Gaynor Cup (United States) Cincinnati, United States; Women: World Events – Silver; 32 players – $86,250	18–22 February	(United States) Amanda Sobhy; 11–8, 11–2, 11–7 (23rd PSA title)	(England) Georgina Kennedy	(Egypt) Salma Hany (England) Jasmine Hutton	(France) Mélissa Alves (Canada) Hollie Naughton (England) Grace Gear (Malaysia) Rachel Arnold
Kogarah Clubhouse Open (Australia) Kogarah, Australia; Men: Challenger 3; 32 players – $3,000	18–22 February	(Australia) Oscar Curtis; 11–9, 11–7, 11–3 (1st PSA title)	(Australia) Thomas Scott	(Australia) Tate Norris (New Zealand) Freddie Jameson	(Australia) James Lloyd (Australia) Gianluca Bushell-O'Connor (Malta) Kijan Sultana (Australia) Caleb Johnson
Squash Canada Granite Challenger; Toronto, Canada; Women: Challenger 3; 16 players - $3,000	23–26 February	(Canada) Nikki Todd; 9–11, 11–9, 10–12, 11–9, 11–3 (3rd PSA title)	(Canada) Niki Shemirani	(Hong Kong) Gladys Ho (Canada) Olivia Bolger	(Canada) Zoe Chong (Canada) Maria Min (Canada) Hasti Shemirani (Canada) Sasha Lee
McMillan Goodfellow Classic (Canada) Toronto, Canada; Men: World Events – Copper; 32 players - $31,250	24–28 February	(Egypt) Yahya Elnawasany; 6–11, 11–1, 12–10, 11–3 (6th PSA title)	(Egypt) Mohamed ElSherbini	(Colombia) Miguel Á Rodríguez (Scotland) Greg Lobban	(France) Toufik Mekhalfi (England) Sam Osborne-Wylde (United States) Shahjahan Khan (Switzerland) David Bernet
Bricomarché Pestka Poznań Open (Poland) Poznań, Poland; Men: Challenger 9; 32 players - $9,000	24–28 February	(Netherlands) Rowan Damming; 8–11, 11–7, 7–11, 11–4, 11–5 (10th PSA title)	(Egypt) Mohamed Gohar	(France) Brice Nicolas (England) Bailey Malik	(Malaysia) Ameeshenraj Chandaran (Hong Kong) Wong Chi Him (England) Will Salter (Egypt) Ibrahim Elkabbani
Steel City Open (United States) Pittsburgh, United States; Women: World Events – Silver; 32 players – $93,000	25 Feb.–1 Mar.	(Japan) Satomi Watanabe; 11–9, 11–5, 11–6 (11th PSA title)	(England) Georgina Kennedy	(England) Jasmine Hutton (United States) Amanda Sobhy	(United States) Sabrina Sobhy (France) Mélissa Alves (Egypt) Rowan Elaraby (England) Saran Nghiem
Edinburgh Open (Scotland) Edinburgh, Scotland; Men: Challenger 3; 32 players - $3,000 −−−−−− Women: Challenger 3; 32 players - $3,000	26 Feb.–1 Mar.	(England) Jared Carter; 9–11, 11–5, 12–10, 11–5 (2nd PSA title)	(England) Jack Mitterer	(Scotland) John Meehan (France) Benjamin Aubert	(Switzerland) Robin Gadola (England) Abdallah Eissa (Australia) David Turner (Malaysia) Shamiel Haeyzad
Edinburgh Open (Scotland) Edinburgh, Scotland; Men: Challenger 3; 32 players - $3,000 −−−−−− Women: Challenger 3; 32 players - $3,000	26 Feb.–1 Mar.	(Republic of Ireland) Breanne Flynn; 11–8, 11–3, 11–4 (2nd PSA title)	(Malaysia) Chen Yu Jie	(Switzerland) Nadia Pfister (Wales) Ellie Breach	(Scotland) Ellie Jones (India) Anjali Semwal (France) Léa Barbeau (France) Ana Munos

=== March ===
Tournament	Date	Champion	Runner-Up	Semifinalists	Quarterfinalists
AirSprint Canadian Men's Open (Canada) Calgary, Canada; Men: World Events – Bronze; 32 players – $72,000	2–6 March	(France) Victor Crouin; 11–3, 11–6, 11–1 (23rd PSA title)	(Egypt) Yahya Elnawasany	(Mexico) Leonel Cárdenas (Colombia) Juan Camilo Vargas	(Egypt) Marwan El Shorbagy (Colombia) Miguel Á Rodríguez (Scotland) Greg Lobban (England) Adrian Waller
Odense Open (Denmark) Odense, Denmark; Men: Challenger 9; 32 players – $9,000 −−−−−− Women: Challenger 9; 32 players – $9,000	3–7 March	(Wales) Emyr Evans; 11–7, 11–9, 12–10 (3rd PSA title)	(Malaysia) Ameeshenraj Chandaran	(France) Edwin Clain (Egypt) Mohamed Sharaf	(Canada) Salah Eltorgman (Malaysia) Duncan Lee (Wales) Rhys Evans (Brazil) Diego Gobbi
Odense Open (Denmark) Odense, Denmark; Men: Challenger 9; 32 players – $9,000 −−−−−− Women: Challenger 9; 32 players – $9,000	3–7 March	(Egypt) Ruqayya Salem; 11–7, 9–11, 11–3, 13–11 (2nd PSA title)	(Egypt) Nour Megahed	(Poland) Karina Tyma (England) Asia Harris	(England) Millie Tomlinson (Wales) Lowri Roberts (Hong Kong) Kirstie Wong (Switzerland) Ambre Allinckx
New Zealand Open; Christchurch, New Zealand; Men: World Events – Silver; 32 players – $105,000 −−−−−− Women: World Events – Silver; 32 players – $105,000	3–8 March	(New Zealand) Paul Coll; 11–7, 11–2, 11–5 (31st PSA title)	(Egypt) Mohamed Zakaria	(Wales) Joel Makin (Spain) Iker Pajares	(Colombia) Matías Knudsen (England) Patrick Rooney (Switzerland) Nicolas Müller (Malaysia) Eain Yow
New Zealand Open; Christchurch, New Zealand; Men: World Events – Silver; 32 players – $105,000 −−−−−− Women: World Events – Silver; 32 players – $105,000	3–8 March	(Belgium) Tinne Gilis; 11–6, 5–11, 12–10, 11–9 (8th PSA title)	(Belgium) Nele Gilis	(United States) Marina Stefanoni (England) Torrie Malik	(Egypt) Nour Heikal (Malaysia) Aira Azman (Hong Kong) Lee Ka Yi (Malaysia) Aifa Azman
Richardson Wealth Women's Open (Canada) Vancouver, Canada; Women: World Events – Copper; 32 players – $31,250	4–8 March	(Scotland) Georgia Adderley; 12–10, 11–9, 11–8 (6th PSA title)	(Egypt) Nardine Garas	(Egypt) Menna Walid (England) Kiera Marshall	(Norway) Madeleine Hylland (Egypt) Jana Swaify (Hong Kong) Toby Tse (Hong Kong) Helen Tang
Mozart Open (Austria) Salzburg, Austria; Men: Challenger 6; 16 players – $6,000 −−−−−− Women: Challenger 6; 32 players – $6,000	4–8 March	(England) Heston Malik; 11–8, 6–11, 11–6, 11–4 (2nd PSA title)	(England) Will Salter	(Austria) Aqeel Rehman (Republic of Ireland) Conor Moran	(England) Bailey Malik (New Zealand) Lwamba Chileshe (England) Noah Meredith (Czech Republic) Jakub Solnický
Mozart Open (Austria) Salzburg, Austria; Men: Challenger 6; 16 players – $6,000 −−−−−− Women: Challenger 6; 32 players – $6,000	4–8 March	(Egypt) Farida Walid; 11–6, 11–8, 11–8 (5th PSA title)	(Republic of Ireland) Breanne Flynn	(France) Ana Munos (England) Olivia Besant	(Egypt) Jana Safy (Italy) Cristina Tartarone (Egypt) Malak Samir (Slovenia) Pika Rupar
Western Province Open (South Africa) Rondebosch, South Africa; Men: Challenger 3; 32 players – $3,000	11–14 March	(South Africa) Damian Groenewald; 11–5, 11–4, 11–1 (4th PSA title)	(South Africa) John Anderson	(South Africa) Jarrod Cousins (South Africa) Ruan Olivier	(South Africa) Ethan Robinson (South Africa) Reuel Videler (South Africa) Ross Smorfitt (South Africa) Dean Venter
Squash Australian Open (Australia) Brisbane, Australia; Men: World Events – Gold; 32 players – $131,000 −−−−−− Women: World Events – Gold; 32 players – $131,000	10–15 March	(New Zealand) Paul Coll; 19–17, 11–4, 14–12 (32nd PSA title)	(Wales) Joel Makin	(Egypt) Mohamed Zakaria (England) Jonah Bryant	(Malaysia) Eain Yow (France) Melvil Scianimanico (Switzerland) Nicolas Müller (France) Auguste Dussourd
Squash Australian Open (Australia) Brisbane, Australia; Men: World Events – Gold; 32 players – $131,000 −−−−−− Women: World Events – Gold; 32 players – $131,000	10–15 March	(Malaysia) Sivasangari Subramaniam; 11–7, 11–4, 11–8 (16th PSA title)	(United States) Marina Stefanoni	(Belgium) Tinne Gilis (Belgium) Nele Gilis	(Egypt) Salma Hany (Egypt) Sana Ibrahim (Malaysia) Aifa Azman (Malaysia) Aira Azman
Calgary CFO PSA Women's Squash Week (Canada) Calgary, Canada; Women: World Events – Copper; 32 players – $31,250	11–15 March	(United States) Sabrina Sobhy; 12–10, 11–4, 13–11 (7th PSA title)	(Egypt) Nardine Garas	(Egypt) Jana Swaify (Scotland) Georgia Adderley	(Republic of Ireland) Hannah Craig (Egypt) Zeina Zein (Malaysia) Yasshmita Jadishkumar (Egypt) Habiba Hani
Northern Open (England) Manchester, England; Women: Challenger 15; 32 players – $15,000	11–15 March	(Egypt) Ruqayya Salem; 11–7, 7–11, 11–6, 5–11, 11–8 (3rd PSA title)	(France) Lauren Baltayan	(England) Asia Harris (England) Katie Malliff	(Poland) Karina Tyma (Malaysia) Zoe Foo (Japan) Akari Midorikawa (Hong Kong) Cheng Nga Ching
Lethbridge ProAm (Canada) Lethbridge, Canada; Men: Challenger 6; 32 players – $6,000	11–15 March	(Malaysia) Nathan Kueh; 9–11, 11–3, 11–7, 11–4 (2nd PSA title)	(Egypt) Marwan Tamer	(Wales) Owain Taylor (Hong Kong) Lam Shing Fung	(United States) Bransten Ming (Canada) Elliott Hunt (Chile) Matías Lacroix (Colombia) Mateo Restrepo
PSA Vello Squash Carnival (Finland) Helsinki, Finland; Men: Challenger 3; 32 players – $3,000 −−−−−− Women: Challenger 3; 32 players – $3,000	12–15 March	(Canada) Salah Eltorgman; 11–5, 11–8, 11–8 (4th PSA title)	(Egypt) Taha ElShafei	(Egypt) Ahmed Rashed (Germany) Finn Koch	(Republic of Ireland) Aaron Allpress (Spain) Oriol Salvià (Switzerland) Fabian Seitz (Malaysia) Harith Danial
PSA Vello Squash Carnival (Finland) Helsinki, Finland; Men: Challenger 3; 32 players – $3,000 −−−−−− Women: Challenger 3; 32 players – $3,000	12–15 March	(Finland) Emilia Soini; 11–8, 11–3, 11–3 (1st PSA title)	(Hong Kong) Bobo Lam	(Wales) Ellie Breach (Hong Kong) Wai Sze Wing	(Republic of Ireland) Hannah McGugan (Belgium) Chloé Crabbé (Finland) Riina Koskinen (Brazil) Luiza Carbonieri
Inventist PSA Open Challenger (Turkey) Istanbul, Turkey; Men: Challenger 3; 32 players – $3,000	12–15 March	(Wales) Elliott Morris Devred; 11–2, 11–8, 11–8 (3rd PSA title)	(France) Matteo Carrouget	(Scotland) John Meehan (United States) Christopher Gordon	(Switzerland) Robin Gadola (Scotland) Rory Richmond (Spain) Hugo Jaén (France) Thomas André Garcia
Egyptian Squash Federation Open #4 (Egypt) Alexandria, Egypt; Men: Challenger 9; 32 players – $9,000 −−−−−− Women: Challenger 9; 32 players – $9,000	12–16 March	(Egypt) Ibrahim Elkabbani; 11–6, 11–5, 8–11, 12–14, 11–2 (8th PSA title)	(Egypt) Omar Said	(Egypt) Eiad Daoud (Egypt) Hazem Hossam	(Egypt) Ziad Ibrahim (Egypt) Seif Tamer (Egypt) Youssef Roushdy (Egypt) Kareem Badawi
Egyptian Squash Federation Open #4 (Egypt) Alexandria, Egypt; Men: Challenger 9; 32 players – $9,000 −−−−−− Women: Challenger 9; 32 players – $9,000	12–16 March	(Egypt) Sohayla Hazem; 11–5, 11–6, 2–11, 12–14, 16–14 (2nd PSA title)	(Egypt) Malika Elkaraksy	(Egypt) Talia Zakaria (Egypt) Nour Megahed	(Egypt) Malak Fathy (Egypt) Habiba Rizk (Egypt) Rinad Elmergawy (Egypt) Shahd Shahen
T-Force.Pro Challenger Series #1 (United States) Philadelphia, United States; Men: Challenger 3; 32 players – $3,000 −−−−−− Women: Challenger 3; 16 players – $3,000	16–20 March	(Hungary) Benedek Takács; 11–8, 11–6, 11–8 (1st PSA title)	(United States) Zane Patel	(Nigeria) Onaopemipo Adegoke (Malaysia) Low Wa Sern	(Argentina) Segundo Portabales (Nigeria) Gabriel Olufunmilayo (South Africa) Luhann Groenewald (Ukraine) Dmytro Shcherbakov
T-Force.Pro Challenger Series #1 (United States) Philadelphia, United States; Men: Challenger 3; 32 players – $3,000 −−−−−− Women: Challenger 3; 16 players – $3,000	16–20 March	(Malaysia) Thanusaa Uthrian; 5–11, 11–6, 7–11, 11–8, 11–3 (1st PSA title)	(Malaysia) Heng Wai Wong	(United States) Caroline Eielson (Canada) Maria Min	(Argentina) Paula Rivero (Malaysia) Doyce Lee (Canada) Sydney Maxwell (Estonia) Eveli Mälk
JSW Indian Open (India) Mumbai, India; Men: World Events – Copper; 32 players – $44,500 −−−−−− Women: World Events – Copper; 32 players – $44,500	18–22 March	(India) Abhay Singh; 11–9, 11–8, 11–4 (12th PSA title)	(India) Veer Chotrani	(Malaysia) Ameeshenraj Chandaran (Malaysia) Sanjay Jeeva	(Egypt) Yassin Shohdy (Egypt) Ibrahim Elkabbani (Egypt) Mohamed Sharaf (Malaysia) Duncan Lee
JSW Indian Open (India) Mumbai, India; Men: World Events – Copper; 32 players – $44,500 −−−−−− Women: World Events – Copper; 32 players – $44,500	18–22 March	(India) Anahat Singh; 11–5, 11–6, 9–11, 11–6 (17th PSA title)	(Egypt) Hana Moataz	(Egypt) Nadien Elhammamy (India) Tanvi Khanna	(Malaysia) Yasshmita Jadishkumar (Malaysia) Ainaa Amani (India) Joshna Chinappa (Malaysia) Sehveetrraa Kumar
East Side Self Storage Manitoba Open (Canada) Winnipeg, Canada; Men: Challenger 15; 32 players – $15,000	18–22 March	(France) Toufik Mekhalfi; 11–13, 11–6, 11–7, 5–11, 11–4 (5th PSA title)	(France) Brice Nicolas	(England) Nathan Lake (England) Tom Walsh	(England) Finnlay Withington (Scotland) Rory Stewart (Egypt) Adam Hawal (United States) Dillon Huang
Filip Krüeger Open (Sweden) Stockholm, Sweden; Men: Challenger 9; 32 players – $9,000	18–22 March	(Netherlands) Rowan Damming; 9–11, 11–8, 11–7, 11–6 (11th PSA title)	(Wales) Emyr Evans	(Republic of Ireland) Sam Buckley (England) Ben Smith	(Canada) Salah Eltorgman (England) Will Salter (Egypt) Mohamed Gohar (Egypt) Shady El Sherbiny
Navruz Squash Open (Uzbekistan) Tashkent, Uzbekistan; Men: Challenger 6; 32 players – $6,000	18–22 March	(Egypt) Seif Refaay; 11–3, 11–4, 11–9 (2nd PSA title)	(Egypt) Ahmed Sobhy	(Pakistan) Tayyab Aslam (France) Antonin Romieu	(Pakistan) Anas Shah (Egypt) Hassan Menshawy (United States) Christopher Gordon (Individual Neutral Athletes) Makar Esin
Alizia Txoperena Basque Country Challenger (Spain) Irun, Spain; Women: Challenger 3; 32 players – $3,000	19–22 March	(Brazil) Laura Silva; 11–8, 11–7, 11–9 (2nd PSA title)	(Ecuador) Rafaela Albuja	(England) Olivia Owens (Netherlands) Megan van Drongelen	(England) Amelie Haworth (Denmark) Caroline Lyng (Scotland) Ellie Jones (Argentina) Pilar Etchechoury
Club Atwater's Centennial Championship (Canada) Montreal, Canada; Men: Challenger 9; 32 players – $9,000	23–27 March	(England) Finnlay Withington; 11–7, 11–8, 11–7 (4th PSA title)	(Canada) David Baillargeon	(Colombia) Ronald Palomino (Israel) Daniel Poleshchuk	(Mexico) César Salazar (Mexico) César Segundo (Wales) Owain Taylor (France) Brice Nicolas
Ilhabela BMW Open (Brazil) Ilhabela, Brazil; Men: Challenger 12; 32 players – $12,000	24–28 March	(England) Simon Herbert; 11–7, 11–6, 3–11, 11–5 (6th PSA title)	(Wales) Rhys Evans	(Scotland) Rory Stewart (Colombia) Juan José Torres	(Brazil) Diego Gobbi (England) Will Salter (Brazil) Vinicius Berbel (Guatemala) Alejandro Enríquez
OptAsia Championships (England) Wimbledon, England; Men: World Events – Gold; 32 players – $129,500 −−−−−− Women: World Events – Gold; 32 players – $129,500	24–29 March	(Egypt) Mostafa Asal; 11–8, 5–11, 11–5, 10–12, 11–5 (28th PSA title)	(Peru) Diego Elías	(Egypt) Karim Gawad (Wales) Joel Makin	(Egypt) Youssef Ibrahim (England) Mohamed El Shorbagy (England) Marwan El Shorbagy (Pakistan) Noor Zaman
OptAsia Championships (England) Wimbledon, England; Men: World Events – Gold; 32 players – $129,500 −−−−−− Women: World Events – Gold; 32 players – $129,500	24–29 March	(Egypt) Hania El Hammamy; 11–9, 12–10, 11–6 (20th PSA title)	(Egypt) Nour El Sherbini	(England) Georgina Kennedy (Japan) Satomi Watanabe	(United States) Amanda Sobhy (Malaysia) Rachel Arnold (Egypt) Farida Mohamed (Egypt) Nada Abbas
Rotterdam Open (Netherlands) Rotterdam, Netherlands; Men: Challenger 6; 32 players - $6,000 −−−−−− Women: Challenger 3; 32 players - $3,000	25–29 March	(Netherlands) Rowan Damming; 20–18, 11–7, 11–9 (12th PSA title)	(Canada) Salah Eltorgman	(Egypt) Hazem Hossam (Belgium) Joeri Hapers	(South Africa) Damian Groenewald (Czech Republic) Martin Štěpán (Wales) Elliott Morris Devred (Hong Kong) Lap Man Au
Rotterdam Open (Netherlands) Rotterdam, Netherlands; Men: Challenger 6; 32 players - $6,000 −−−−−− Women: Challenger 3; 32 players - $3,000	25–29 March	(Malaysia) Harleein Tan; 10–12, 10–12, 11–8, 11–4, 11–8 (1st PSA title)	(France) Léa Barbeau	(Netherlands) Tessa ter Sluis (Wales) Ellie Breach	(Denmark) Caroline Lyng (France) Rose Lucas-Marcuzzo (Netherlands) Juliette Permentier (Malaysia) Chen Yu Ng
World Championship Qualifiers – Oceania (Australia) Kooyong, Australia; Men: WC Qualifier; 16 players – $5,060 −−−−−− Women: WC Qualifier; 16 players – $5,060	26–29 March	(Australia) Joseph White; 11–5, 11–5, 11–5 (Qualified for PSA World Championship & 4th PSA title)	(New Zealand) Lwamba Chileshe	(New Zealand) Freddie Jameson (Australia) David Turner	(Australia) Connor Hayes (New Zealand) Elijah Thomas (Australia) Dylan Molinaro (Australia) Bradley Fullick
World Championship Qualifiers – Oceania (Australia) Kooyong, Australia; Men: WC Qualifier; 16 players – $5,060 −−−−−− Women: WC Qualifier; 16 players – $5,060	26–29 March	(New Zealand) Kaitlyn Watts; 8–11, 11–7, 11–5, 11–2 (Qualified for PSA World Championship & 4th PSA title)	(New Zealand) Ella Lash	(Australia) Madison Lyon (Australia) Sophie Fadaely	(Australia) Jessica van der Walt (Australia) Sarah Cardwell (Australia) Remashree Muniandy (Australia) Erin Classen

=== April ===
Tournament	Date	Champion	Runner-Up	Semifinalists	Quarterfinalists
World Championship Qualifiers – Asia; Hong Kong, China; Men: WC Qualifier; 16 players – $5,050 −−−−−− Women: WC Qualifier; 16 players – $5,050	1–4 April	(Pakistan) Asim Khan; 11–3, 13–11, 9–11, 3–11, 12–10 (Qualified for PSA World Championship & 13th PSA title)	(Malaysia) Joachim Chuah	(Hong Kong) Tang Ming Hong (Malaysia) Sanjay Jeeva	(Hong Kong) Wong Chi Him (Hong Kong) Lam Shing Fung (Malaysia) Syafiq Kamal (Malaysia) Duncan Lee
World Championship Qualifiers – Asia; Hong Kong, China; Men: WC Qualifier; 16 players – $5,050 −−−−−− Women: WC Qualifier; 16 players – $5,050	1–4 April	(Hong Kong) Toby Tse; 5–11, 11–6, 11–8, 9–11, 11–7 (Qualified for PSA World Championship & 7th PSA title)	(Hong Kong) Heylie Fung	(Malaysia) Ainaa Amani (Hong Kong) Helen Tang	(Japan) Akari Midorikawa (Hong Kong) Kirstie Wong (Malaysia) Sehveetrraa Kumar (India) Tanvi Khanna
Northumbria Open (England) Newcastle, England; Men: Challenger 3; 32 players - $3,000	1–5 April	(Wales) Elliott Morris Devred; 11–6, 11–5, 8–11, 11–6 (4th PSA title)	(Canada) Karim Aguib	(Egypt) Ahmed Rashed (Scotland) John Meehan	(Malaysia) Harith Danial (France) Titouan Isambard (Spain) Hugo Jaén (Malaysia) N Moganasundharam
El Gouna International (Egypt) El Gouna, Egypt; Men: World Events – Platinum; 32 players – $232,500 −−−−−− Women: World Events – Platinum; 32 players – $232,500	4–10 April	(Peru) Diego Elías; 11–1, 11–7, 11–1 (21st PSA title)	(Egypt) Mohamed Zakaria	(Egypt) Mostafa Asal (Egypt) Youssef Ibrahim	(Egypt) Karim Gawad (New Zealand) Paul Coll (Mexico) Leonel Cárdenas (England) Marwan El Shorbagy
El Gouna International (Egypt) El Gouna, Egypt; Men: World Events – Platinum; 32 players – $232,500 −−−−−− Women: World Events – Platinum; 32 players – $232,500	4–10 April	(Egypt) Hania El Hammamy; 11–7, 9–11, 8–11, 11–4, 11–9 (21st PSA title)	(Egypt) Nour El Sherbini	(Egypt) Amina Orfi (United States) Olivia Weaver	(Malaysia) Sivasangari Subramaniam (Japan) Satomi Watanabe (Egypt) Fayrouz Aboelkheir (England) Georgina Kennedy
Harvard Club of Boston Open (United States) Boston, United States; Men: Challenger 3; 32 players - $3,000 −−−−−− Women: Challenger 3; 16 players - $3,000	7–10 April	(Malaysia) Low Wa Sern; 11–8, 11–4, 12–10 (1st PSA title)	(Egypt) Youssef Bastawy	(Republic of Ireland) Denis Gilevskiy (Egypt) Mohamed Nawar	(Hong Kong) Corey Shen (Egypt) Omar Azzam (England) Lewis Anderson (United States) Hart Robertson
Harvard Club of Boston Open (United States) Boston, United States; Men: Challenger 3; 32 players - $3,000 −−−−−− Women: Challenger 3; 16 players - $3,000	7–10 April	(United States) Charlotte Sze; 13–11, 14–12, 11–13, 8–11, 11–8 (1st PSA title)	(United States) Isabella Tang	(Spain) Ona Blasco (United States) Lily Bourell	(Malaysia) Thanusaa Uthrian (Argentina) Paula Rivero (Malaysia) Doyce Lee (United States) Emily Ramirez
Assore Tour #1 (South Africa) Johannesburg, South Africa; Men: Challenger 3; 32 players - $3,000 −−−−−− Women: Challenger 3; 32 players - $3,000	7–11 April	(England) Jared Carter; 8–11, 11–3, 11–2, 11–6 (3rd PSA title)	(Egypt) Ahmed Sherif	(Egypt) Youssef Roushdy (South Africa) John Anderson	(South Africa) Reuel Videler (South Africa) Luke Jacoby (Egypt) Omar Bahgat (Pakistan) Saeed Abdul
Assore Tour #1 (South Africa) Johannesburg, South Africa; Men: Challenger 3; 32 players - $3,000 −−−−−− Women: Challenger 3; 32 players - $3,000	7–11 April	(Egypt) Hana Aladdin; 7–11, 11–5, 11–5, 11–9 (1st PSA title)	(Egypt) Malak ElMaraghy	(Egypt) Fatema Zohdy (South Africa) Teagan Russell	(Egypt) Amira Elrefaey (South Africa) Jordin Phillips (South Africa) Helena Hudson (South Africa) Keschia Scorgie
World Championship Qualifiers – Pan America (United States) St. Louis, United States; Men: WC Qualifier; 16 players – $2,750 −−−−−− Women: WC Qualifier; 16 players – $2,750	8–11 April	(Argentina) Jeremías Azaña; 11–7, 11–13, 11–7, 17–15 (Qualified for PSA World Championship & 3rd PSA title)	(United States) Nicholas Spizzirri	(Argentina) Leandro Romiglio (Guatemala) Alejandro Enríquez	(United States) Shahjahan Khan (Canada) David Baillargeon (United States) Salim Khan (Paraguay) Francesco Marcantonio
World Championship Qualifiers – Pan America (United States) St. Louis, United States; Men: WC Qualifier; 16 players – $2,750 −−−−−− Women: WC Qualifier; 16 players – $2,750	8–11 April	(United States) Caroline Fouts; 11–7, 12–10, 6–11, 5–11, 11–4 (Qualified for PSA World Championship & 3rd PSA title)	(Colombia) Lucía Bautista	(Barbados) Margot Prow (Mexico) Diana García	(United States) Lucie Stefanoni (Canada) Danielle Ray (United States) Laila Sedky (United States) Riva Bhagwati
K2 Squash PSA Men's Challenger (United States) Berwyn, United States; Men: Challenger 15; 32 players - $15,000	8–12 April	(Egypt) Salman Khalil; 11–8, 11–8, 11–7 (5th PSA title)	(England) Finnlay Withington	(Egypt) Aly Tolba (Egypt) Mohamed Sharaf	(England) Tom Walsh (Malaysia) Joachim Chuah (Egypt) Yassin ElShafei (New Zealand) Lwamba Chileshe
Hazlow Electronics Rochester Pro-Am (United States) Rochester, United States; Men: Challenger 9; 32 players – $9,000	8–12 April	(Malaysia) Siow Yee Xian; 12–10, 11–6, 12–10 (2nd PSA title)	(Egypt) Abdullah Hafez	(England) Yusuf Sheikh (Egypt) Mohamed Gohar	(Egypt) Kareem Badawi (Pakistan) Huzaifa Ibrahim (Germany) Jan Wipperfürth (Colombia) Juan Irisarri
World Championship Qualifiers – Europe (England) Pontefract, England; Men: WC Qualifier; 16 players – $2,750 −−−−−− Women: WC Qualifier; 16 players – $2,750	9–12 April	(England) Sam Osborne-Wylde; 11–9, 11–3, 11–4 (Qualified for PSA World Championship & 5th PSA title)	(Czech Republic) Viktor Byrtus	(Netherlands) Rowan Damming (Wales) Emyr Evans	(England) Ben Smith (England) Perry Malik (Wales) Rhys Evans (France) Edwin Clain
World Championship Qualifiers – Europe (England) Pontefract, England; Men: WC Qualifier; 16 players – $2,750 −−−−−− Women: WC Qualifier; 16 players – $2,750	9–12 April	(Republic of Ireland) Hannah Craig; 11–13, 11–4, 11–7, 8–11, 11–5 (Qualified for PSA World Championship & 2nd PSA title)	(Poland) Karina Tyma	(Wales) Lowri Roberts (England) Millie Tomlinson	(Netherlands) Tessa ter Sluis (Germany) Katerina Tycova (Norway) Madeleine Hylland (Switzerland) Ambre Allinckx
Assore Tour #2 (South Africa) Johannesburg, South Africa; Men: Challenger 3; 32 players - $3,000 −−−−−− Women: Challenger 3; 32 players - $3,000	12–16 April	(Egypt) Youssef Roushdy; 11–3, 11–5, 11–7 (1st PSA title)	(Egypt) Ahmed Sherif	(Egypt) Yusuf Elsherif (South Africa) John Anderson	(Pakistan) Anas Khan (South Africa) Luke Jacoby (Pakistan) Saeed Abdul (South Africa) Reuel Videler
Assore Tour #2 (South Africa) Johannesburg, South Africa; Men: Challenger 3; 32 players - $3,000 −−−−−− Women: Challenger 3; 32 players - $3,000	12–16 April	(Egypt) Amira Elrefaey; 7–11, 11–5, 11–5, 11–9 (1st PSA title)	(Egypt) Malak ElMaraghy	(Egypt) Hana Aladdin (South Africa) Elske Garbers	(South Africa) Lara Patrick (Egypt) Fatema Zohdy (South Africa) Starla Phillips (South Africa) Helena Hudson
STARR Bermuda Open; Devonshire, Bermuda; Men: World Events – Copper; 32 players – $31,000 −−−−−− Women: World Events – Copper; 32 players – $31,000	14–18 April	(Colombia) Miguel Á Rodríguez; 11–5, 7–11, 9–11, 11–5, 11–7 (32nd PSA title)	(Egypt) Kareem El Torkey	(Argentina) Leandro Romiglio (United States) Nicholas Spizzirri	(United States) Timothy Brownell (Portugal) Rui Soares (Egypt) Yahya Elnawasany (Egypt) Salman Khalil
STARR Bermuda Open; Devonshire, Bermuda; Men: World Events – Copper; 32 players – $31,000 −−−−−− Women: World Events – Copper; 32 players – $31,000	14–18 April	(England) Lucy Turmel; 4–11, 7–11, 7–7^{rtd.} (7th PSA title)	(United States) Sabrina Sobhy	(Egypt) Haya Ali (Egypt) Nadine Shahin	(Ukraine) Alina Bushma (Barbados) Margot Prow (Spain) Noa Romero (Egypt) Menna Hamed
Sportwerk Hamburg Open (Germany) Hamburg, Germany; Men: World Events – Bronze; 32 players – $66,500 −−−−−− Women: World Events – Bronze; 32 players – $66,500	15–19 April	(Egypt) Aly Abou Eleinen; 11–5, 11–8, 11–5 (4th PSA title)	(Egypt) Youssef Soliman	(France) Baptiste Masotti (Egypt) Fares Dessouky	(India) Veer Chotrani (France) Melvil Scianimanico (England) Sam Todd (Hungary) Balázs Farkas
Sportwerk Hamburg Open (Germany) Hamburg, Germany; Men: World Events – Bronze; 32 players – $66,500 −−−−−− Women: World Events – Bronze; 32 players – $66,500	15–19 April	(England) Jasmine Hutton; 11–8, 11–7, 13–11 (10th PSA title)	(Belgium) Nele Gilis	(France) Mélissa Alves (Egypt) Salma Hany	(New Zealand) Joelle King (Spain) Marta Domínguez (Egypt) Malak Khafagy (Canada) Hollie Naughton
The Smyths Toys Hinckley Challenger (England) Hinckley, England; Men: Challenger 3; 32 players – $3,000 −−−−−− Women: Challenger 3; 32 players – $3,000	15–19 April	(Egypt) Ahmed Rashed; 11–8, 11–8, 11–9 (2nd PSA title)	(England) Abdallah Eissa	(France) Titouan Isambard (Wales) Elliott Morris Devred	(Malaysia) Harith Danial (South Korea) Na Joo-young (Scotland) John Meehan (Netherlands) Sam Gerrits
The Smyths Toys Hinckley Challenger (England) Hinckley, England; Men: Challenger 3; 32 players – $3,000 −−−−−− Women: Challenger 3; 32 players – $3,000	15–19 April	(Wales) Ellie Breach; 8–11, 11–7, 11–5, 11–3 (1st PSA title)	(England) Emily Coulcher-Porter	(Czech Republic) Karolína Šrámková (South Korea) Oh Sung-hee	(Nigeria) Abdulazeez Rofiat (Singapore) Wai Lynn Au Yeong (England) Reka Kemecsei (Slovenia) Pika Rupar
HCL PSA Challenger Tour (India) Chennai, India; Men: Challenger 6; 32 players – $6,000 −−−−−− Women: Challenger 6; 32 players – $6,000	16–20 April	(India) Suraj Chand; 11–5, 11–9, 11–3 (4th PSA title)	(South Korea) Ryu Jeong-min	(Hong Kong) Andes Ling (Hong Kong) To Wai Lok	(Hong Kong) Lap Man Au (Sri Lanka) Ravindu Laksiri (Malaysia) N Moganasundharam (India) Om Semwal
HCL PSA Challenger Tour (India) Chennai, India; Men: Challenger 6; 32 players – $6,000 −−−−−− Women: Challenger 6; 32 players – $6,000	16–20 April	(Egypt) Rouqaia Othman; 12–10, 11–7, 9–11, 11–7 (1st PSA title)	(Malaysia) Harleein Tan	(Malaysia) Sehveetrraa Kumar (Egypt) Salma Othman	(South Korea) Heo Min-gyeong (India) Rathika Seelan (India) Pooja Arthi (India) Nirupama Dubey
Copa do Brasil (Brazil) Florianópolis, Brazil; Men: Challenger 3; 16 players – $3,000 −−−−−− Women: Challenger 3; 16 players - $3,000	18–21 April	(Brazil) Pedro Mometto; 11–4, 11–8, 14–12 (3rd PSA title)	(Brazil) Murilo Penteado	(Ecuador) Álvaro Buenaño (Brazil) Vinicius Costa	(Brazil) Vinicius Berbel (Brazil) Rhuan Sousa (Brazil) Isaias Melo (Brazil) Matheus Carbonieri
Copa do Brasil (Brazil) Florianópolis, Brazil; Men: Challenger 3; 16 players – $3,000 −−−−−− Women: Challenger 3; 16 players - $3,000	18–21 April	(Ecuador) Caridad Buenaño; 11–5, 11–0, 11–2 (1st PSA title)	(Brazil) Juliana Feibelmann	(Brazil) Luiza Carbonieri (Argentina) Paula Rivero	(Brazil) Giulia Colleoni (Brazil) Anna-Rose Lee (Brazil) Roberta Carvalho (Brazil) Marcela Terres
RC Pro Series (United States) St. Louis, United States; Men: Challenger 15; 32 players – $15,000 −−−−−− Women: Challenger 15; 32 players – $15,000	21–25 April	(England) Finnlay Withington; 9–11, 11–6, 11–8, 11–9 (5th PSA title)	(Hong Kong) Henry Leung	(Malaysia) Sanjay Jeeva (Republic of Ireland) Sam Buckley	(United States) Nicholas Spizzirri (England) Perry Malik (Argentina) Leandro Romiglio (England) Tom Walsh
RC Pro Series (United States) St. Louis, United States; Men: Challenger 15; 32 players – $15,000 −−−−−− Women: Challenger 15; 32 players – $15,000	21–25 April	(Malaysia) Ainaa Amani; 11–7, 8–11, 11–9, 7–11, 11–3 (4th PSA title)	(Egypt) Jana Safy	(Egypt) Nadine Shahin (Egypt) Menna Hamed	(Canada) Nicole Bunyan (England) Kiera Marshall (Hong Kong) Ena Kwong (Egypt) Malak Fathy
1st Guatemala Open; Guatemala City, Guatemala; Men: Challenger 15; 32 players – $15,000	21–25 April	(England) Sam Osborne-Wylde; 11–9, 11–4, 11–7 (6th PSA title)	(Argentina) Jeremías Azaña	(Paraguay) Francesco Marcantonio (Mexico) Alfredo Ávila	(Egypt) Mohamed Gohar (Guatemala) Alejandro Enríquez (Colombia) Andrés Herrera (Wales) Rhys Evans
Max Challenge = Squash du Rêve Maxeville (France) Maxéville, France; Men: Challenger 6; 32 players – $6,000	21–25 April	(France) Amir Khaled-Jousselin; 11–7, 11–9, 11–1 (4th PSA title)	(Germany) Yannik Omlor	(England) Heston Malik (Canada) Karim Aguib	(Czech Republic) Jakub Solnický (France) Matteo Carrouget (Egypt) Ahmed Rashed (Czech Republic) Viktor Byrtus
Palace Kiva Open (United States) Santa Fe, United States; Men: Challenger 6; 32 players – $6,000	21–25 April	(Malaysia) Siow Yee Xian; 11–7, 8–11, 12–10, 11–5 (3rd PSA title)	(Malaysia) Nathan Kueh	(England) Noah Meredith (Colombia) Edgar Ramírez	(Canada) David Baillargeon (Mexico) Arturo Vidal (Mexico) Wally de los Santos (Mexico) Alfredo López
Grasshopper Cup (Switzerland) Zürich, Switzerland; Men: World Events – Gold; 32 players – $133,000 −−−−−− Women: World Events – Gold; 32 players – $133,000	21–26 April	(Egypt) Karim Gawad; 11–8, 11–4, 11–5 (32nd PSA title)	(France) Victor Crouin	(Wales) Joel Makin (Peru) Diego Elías	(Spain) Iker Pajares (England) Declan James (Egypt) Mohamed Abouelghar (India) Abhay Singh
Grasshopper Cup (Switzerland) Zürich, Switzerland; Men: World Events – Gold; 32 players – $133,000 −−−−−− Women: World Events – Gold; 32 players – $133,000	21–26 April	(Malaysia) Sivasangari Subramaniam; 15–13, 5–11, 5–11, 11–7, 11–8 (17th PSA title)	(Japan) Satomi Watanabe	(Egypt) Amina Orfi (England) Georgina Kennedy	(Egypt) Salma Hany (Egypt) Fayrouz Aboelkheir (England) Jasmine Hutton (Egypt) Nada Abbas
K2 Squash PSA Women's Challenger (United States) Berwyn, United States; Women: Challenger 6; 32 players - $6,000	22–26 April	(Egypt) Zeina Zein; 11–9, 11–7, 8–11, 11–3 (6th PSA title)	(United States) Lucie Stefanoni	(Egypt) Malak Taha (Brazil) Laura Silva	(South Korea) Eum Hwa-yeong (South Korea) Lee Ji-hyun (France) Rose Lucas-Marcuzzo (South Korea) Ryoo Bo-ram
World Championship Qualifiers – Africa (Egypt) Giza, Egypt; Men: WC Qualifier; 16 players – $5,050 −−−−−− Women: WC Qualifier; 16 players – $5,050	28 Apr.–1 May	(Egypt) Adam Hawal; 11–6, 6–11, 8–11, 11–9, 11–7 (Qualified for PSA World Championship & 1st PSA title)	(Egypt) Yassin Shohdy	(Egypt) Yassin ElShafei (Egypt) Mohamed Gohar	(Egypt) Mohamed Nasser (Egypt) Eiad Daoud (Egypt) Ahmed Sobhy (Egypt) Taha ElShafei
World Championship Qualifiers – Africa (Egypt) Giza, Egypt; Men: WC Qualifier; 16 players – $5,050 −−−−−− Women: WC Qualifier; 16 players – $5,050	28 Apr.–1 May	(Egypt) Ruqayya Salem; 11–6, 11–4, 11–4 (Qualified for PSA World Championship & 4th PSA title)	(Egypt) Farida Walid	(Egypt) Malak Fathy (Egypt) Nour Khafagy	(Egypt) Nour Megahed (Egypt) Rana Ismail (Egypt) Rama El Naggar (Egypt) Barb Sameh
Hyder Trophy (United States) New York City, United States; Men: Challenger 12; 32 players – $12,000 −−−−−− Women: Challenger 12; 32 players – $12,000	29 Apr.–3 May	(England) Tom Walsh; 11–3, 11–7, 5–11, 11–7 (4th PSA title)	(Malaysia) Joachim Chuah	(Malaysia) Nathan Kueh (Egypt) Marwan Tamer	(Malaysia) Siow Yee Xian (Guatemala) Alejandro Enríquez (South Africa) Dewald van Niekerk (Malaysia) Ameeshenraj Chandaran
Hyder Trophy (United States) New York City, United States; Men: Challenger 12; 32 players – $12,000 −−−−−− Women: Challenger 12; 32 players – $12,000	29 Apr.–3 May	(United States) Caroline Fouts; 11–6, 7–11, 11–4, 14–16, 11–1 (4th PSA title)	(Barbados) Margot Prow	(Egypt) Malak Taha (Malaysia) Ainaa Amani	(Hong Kong) Ena Kwong (United States) Isabella Tang (Colombia) Lucía Bautista (Norway) Madeleine Hylland

=== May ===
Tournament	Date	Champion	Runner-Up	Semifinalists	Quarterfinalists
EMCS - Tortola Classic (British Virgin Islands) Road Town, British Virgin Islands; Men: Challenger 6; 16 players – $6,000	5–8 May	(United States) Nicholas Spizzirri; 11–13, 11–1, 11–9, 8–11, 11–5 (4th PSA title)	(Pakistan) Huzaifa Ibrahim	(England) Adam Murrills (United States) Tad Carney	(British Virgin Islands) Joe Chapman (Canada) Charles de la Riva (United States) Ian Rothweiler (United States) Abhiroop Nagireddygari
Squash Inspire - Femi Orelaja Memorial 9k (United States) Columbia, United States; Men: Challenger 9; 32 players – $9,000	5–9 May	(Netherlands) Rowan Damming; 11–9, 11–6, 12–10 (13th PSA title)	(Canada) David Baillargeon	(United States) Dillon Huang (Malaysia) Nathan Kueh	(Egypt) Aly Tolba (Egypt) Ziad Ibrahim (Malaysia) Siow Yee Xian (South Africa) Callan Hall
Haochi & Bristol Buccaneers Open (England) Bristol, England; Men: Challenger 6; 32 players – $6,000 −−−−−− Women: Challenger 6; 32 players – $6,000	5–9 May	(France) Edwin Clain; 11–5, 11–9, 11–9 (3rd PSA title)	(England) Bailey Malik	(France) Baptiste Bouin (England) Jared Carter	(Germany) Valentin Rapp (Belgium) Joeri Hapers (England) Ronnie Hickling (Zimbabwe) Ryan Gwidzima
Haochi & Bristol Buccaneers Open (England) Bristol, England; Men: Challenger 6; 32 players – $6,000 −−−−−− Women: Challenger 6; 32 players – $6,000	5–9 May	(Italy) Cristina Tartarone; 11–9, 12–10, 7–11, 11–5 (5th PSA title)	(Croatia) Franka Vidović	(England) Olivia Owens (Netherlands) Tessa ter Sluis	(Argentina) Pilar Etchechoury (Scotland) Robyn McAlpine (Wales) Ellie Breach (France) Rose Lucas-Marcuzzo
CIB Palm Hills PSA World Championships (Egypt) Giza, Egypt; Men: World Championship; 64 players - $701,500 – Draw −−−−−− Women: World Championship; 64 players - $701,500 – Draw	8–16 May	(Egypt) Mostafa Asal; 11–4, 11–1, 12–10 (29th PSA title) (2nd World Championship title)	(Egypt) Youssef Ibrahim	(Egypt) Karim Gawad (Peru) Diego Elías	(New Zealand) Paul Coll (Egypt) Youssef Soliman (Egypt) Mohamed Zakaria (Wales) Joel Makin
CIB Palm Hills PSA World Championships (Egypt) Giza, Egypt; Men: World Championship; 64 players - $701,500 – Draw −−−−−− Women: World Championship; 64 players - $701,500 – Draw	8–16 May	(Egypt) Amina Orfi; 6–11, 11–6, 11–9, 7–11, 14–12 (12th PSA title) (1st World Championship title)	(Egypt) Nour El Sherbini	(United States) Olivia Weaver (Egypt) Hania El Hammamy	(Malaysia) Sivasangari Subramaniam (Egypt) Salma Hany (England) Georgina Kennedy (Japan) Satomi Watanabe
West of Ireland Open (Republic of Ireland) Galway, Republic of Ireland; Men: Challenger 15; 32 players - $15,000	12–16 May	(England) Sam Osborne-Wylde; 11–7, 11–6, 11–8 (7th PSA title)	(England) Perry Malik	(Republic of Ireland) Sam Buckley (Wales) Emyr Evans	(Portugal) Rui Soares (Israel) Daniel Poleshchuk (New Zealand) Oliver Dunbar (Malaysia) Duncan Lee
PSA Ljubljana Dragon Open (Slovenia) Ljubljana, Slovenia; Women: Challenger 3; 32 players - $3,000	14–17 May	(Croatia) Franka Vidović; 11–4, 12–10, 11–6 (1st PSA title)	(France) Rose Lucas-Marcuzzo	(Ecuador) Rafaela Albuja (Netherlands) Tessa ter Sluis	(England) Olivia Owens (Netherlands) Renske Huntelaar (Slovenia) Pika Rupar (Hungary) Csenge Kiss-Máté
V Golán Squash Academy Open (Spain) O Milladoiro, Spain; Men: Challenger 3; 32 players – $3,000	18–21 May	(Egypt) Taha ElShafei; 11–6, 19–17, 11–2 (1st PSA title)	(France) Matteo Carrouget	(Spain) Hugo Jaén (Spain) Pascal Gómez	(Spain) Sergio García (France) Laouenan Loaëc (England) Anthony Rogal (Spain) Víctor Reguera
Quilter Cheviot Cannon Kirk Irish Open (Republic of Ireland) Dublin, Republic of Ireland; Men: World Events – Copper; 32 players – $41,500 −−−−−− Women: World Events – Copper; 32 players – $41,500	19–23 May	(England) Sam Todd; 11–8, 11–7, 11–6 (9th PSA title)	(Japan) Ryūnosuke Tsukue	(Colombia) Matías Knudsen (Wales) Emyr Evans	(Malaysia) Sanjay Jeeva (Portugal) Rui Soares (England) Perry Malik (England) Finnlay Withington
Quilter Cheviot Cannon Kirk Irish Open (Republic of Ireland) Dublin, Republic of Ireland; Men: World Events – Copper; 32 players – $41,500 −−−−−− Women: World Events – Copper; 32 players – $41,500	19–23 May	(Egypt) Nadien Elhammamy; 12–10, 11–6, 6–11, 9–11, 11–8 (6th PSA title)	(Egypt) Nada Abbas	(Egypt) Nardine Garas (Egypt) Zeina Mickawy	(New Zealand) Joelle King (New Zealand) Kaitlyn Watts (Egypt) Hana Ramadan (Republic of Ireland) Breanne Flynn
ECP Open (Brazil) São Paulo, Brazil; Men: Challenger 15; 32 players – $15,000 −−−−−− Women: Challenger 15; 32 players – $15,000	19–23 May	(Spain) Iván Pérez; 11–2, 13–11, 12–10 (8th PSA title)	(France) Toufik Mekhalfi	(Guatemala) Alejandro Enríquez (Argentina) Jeremías Azaña	(France) Edwin Clain (United States) Nicholas Spizzirri (Wales) Rhys Evans (France) Benjamin Aubert
ECP Open (Brazil) São Paulo, Brazil; Men: Challenger 15; 32 players – $15,000 −−−−−− Women: Challenger 15; 32 players – $15,000	19–23 May	(Spain) Marta Domínguez; 12–14, 10–12, 15–13, 11–8, 11–7 (5th PSA title)	(Colombia) Lucía Bautista	(Malaysia) Yasshmita Jadishkumar (South Africa) Hayley Ward	(Brazil) Laura Silva (Colombia) Laura Tovar (Malaysia) Yee Xin Ying (Scotland) Robyn McAlpine
Swarmer SA Open (Australia) North Adelaide, Australia; Men: Challenger 6; 32 players – $6,000 −−−−−− Women: Challenger 6; 32 players – $6,000	20–24 May	(Hong Kong) Wong Chi Him; 11–8, 11–1, 11–3 (12th PSA title)	(Switzerland) Louai Hafez	(Japan) Naoki Hayashi (New Zealand) Freddie Jameson	(Hong Kong) Harley Lam (Australia) Thomas Scott (Australia) Connor Hayes (Australia) Nicholas Calvert
Swarmer SA Open (Australia) North Adelaide, Australia; Men: Challenger 6; 32 players – $6,000 −−−−−− Women: Challenger 6; 32 players – $6,000	20–24 May	(Hong Kong) Heylie Fung; 7–11, 11–9, 15–13, 11–8 (4th PSA title)	(Japan) Akari Midorikawa	(South Korea) Heo Min-gyeong (Hong Kong) Bobo Lam	(Hong Kong) Cheng Nga Ching (New Zealand) Jena Gregory (Hong Kong) Wai Sze Wing (Australia) Remashree Muniandy
27th Atlanta Open (United States) Atlanta, United States; Men: Challenger 6; 32 players – $6,000	20–24 May	(Egypt) Omar Said; 11–13, 11–5, 11–3, 11–9 (3rd PSA title)	(Egypt) Marwan Tamer	(Malaysia) Siow Yee Xian (Egypt) Omar Elkattan	(Pakistan) Sami Ullah (Pakistan) Ahsan Ayaz (Chile) Matías Lacroix (Pakistan) Huzaifa Ibrahim
Assore Tour #3 (South Africa) Johannesburg, South Africa; Men: Challenger 3; 32 players - $3,000 −−−−−− Women: Challenger 3; 16 players - $3,000	20–24 May	(South Africa) Damian Groenewald; 11–7, 11–4, 11–3 (5th PSA title)	(South Africa) Ruan Olivier	(Egypt) Youssef Kabbash (South Africa) Reuel Videler	(South Africa) Diodivine Mkhize (Zimbabwe) Ryan Gwidzima (South Africa) Ethan Robinson (South Africa) Luke Jacoby
Assore Tour #3 (South Africa) Johannesburg, South Africa; Men: Challenger 3; 32 players - $3,000 −−−−−− Women: Challenger 3; 16 players - $3,000	20–24 May	(Egypt) Lojayn Gohary; 11–2, 11–13, 11–3, 12–10 (1st PSA title)	(South Africa) Helena Hudson	(South Africa) Teagan Russell (South Africa) Keschia Scorgie	(South Africa) Kimberley McDonald (South Africa) Elske Garbers (South Africa) Jordin Phillips (South Africa) Kaylee Hunt
V Golán Squash Academy Open (Spain) O Milladoiro, Spain; Women: Challenger 3; 16 players – $3,000	21–24 May	(Spain) Ona Blasco; 8–11, 11–5, 8–11, 11–7, 11–8 (1st PSA title)	(France) Léa Barbeau	(Malta) Colette Sultana (Denmark) Caroline Lyng	(Spain) Inés Gómez (Egypt) Amina ElBorolossy (Spain) Montse Fajardo (Portugal) Catarina Nunes
BH Open (Brazil) Belo Horizonte, Brazil; Men: Challenger 15; 32 players – $15,000	26–30 May	(France) Toufik Mekhalfi; 11–6, 8–11, 11–9, 8–11, 11–4 (6th PSA title)	(Spain) Iván Pérez	(Guatemala) Alejandro Enríquez (France) Macéo Lévy	(Netherlands) Rowan Damming (Egypt) Seif Tamer (United States) Nicholas Spizzirri (France) Edwin Clain
Curitiba Open (Brazil) Curitiba, Brazil; Women: Challenger 15; 32 players – $15,000	26–30 May	(Spain) Marta Domínguez; 11–8, 15–17, 11–6, 11–9 (6th PSA title)	(Colombia) Lucía Bautista	(Malaysia) Yasshmita Jadishkumar (Brazil) Laura Silva	(Malaysia) Yee Xin Ying (Mexico) Sarahí López (Colombia) Laura Tovar (Switzerland) Ambre Allinckx
Heroes Austrian Open (Austria) Graz, Austria; Women: Challenger 12; 32 players – $12,000	26–30 May	(Croatia) Franka Vidović; 11–5, 11–3, 11–9 (2nd PSA title)	(Egypt) Malika Elkaraksy	(Switzerland) Nadia Pfister (France) Énora Villard	(Egypt) Amina El Rihany (Egypt) Nadine Shahin (Netherlands) Megan van Drongelen (Portugal) Catarina Nunes
Assore Tour #4 (South Africa) Johannesburg, South Africa; Men: Challenger 3; 32 players - $3,000 −−−−−− Women: Challenger 3; 16 players - $3,000	26–30 May	(South Africa) Damian Groenewald; 11–9, 11–3, 11–4 (6th PSA title)	(South Africa) Ruan Olivier	(South Africa) John Anderson (South Africa) Reuel Videler	(Spain) Ignacio Fajardo (Egypt) Youssef Kabbash (Zimbabwe) Ryan Gwidzima (South Africa) Ethan Robinson
Assore Tour #4 (South Africa) Johannesburg, South Africa; Men: Challenger 3; 32 players - $3,000 −−−−−− Women: Challenger 3; 16 players - $3,000	26–30 May	(Egypt) Lojayn Gohary; 11–8, 11–8, 11–5 (2nd PSA title)	(South Africa) Helena Hudson	(South Africa) Lara Patrick (South Africa) Teagan Russell	(South Africa) Kimberley McDonald (South Africa) Keschia Scorgie (South Africa) Jordin Phillips (South Africa) Kaylee Hunt
Tekae Delta Open; Mexico City, Mexico; Men: Challenger 3; 32 players – $3,000	27–31 May	(Ecuador) Álvaro Buenaño; 11–8, 11–8, 11–5 (3rd PSA title)	(Colombia) Alejandro Martínez	(Mexico) Alejandro Reyes (Mexico) Alfredo Ávila	(Mexico) Jorge Gómez (Mexico) Luis Marcos Méndez (Mexico) Luis Aquino (Colombia) José Santamaría
Northern Star Resources Golden Open (Australia) Kalgoorlie, Australia; Men: Challenger 6; 32 players – $6,000 −−−−−− Women: Challenger 6; 16 players – $6,000	29–31 May	(Switzerland) Louai Hafez; 11–7, 9–11, 11–5, 11–6 (2nd PSA title)	(Japan) Naoki Hayashi	(Australia) Thomas Scott (Malaysia) Bryan Lim	(South Korea) Ryu Jeong-min (Australia) Nicholas Calvert (Hong Kong) To Wai Lok (Australia) Brendan MacDonald
Northern Star Resources Golden Open (Australia) Kalgoorlie, Australia; Men: Challenger 6; 32 players – $6,000 −−−−−− Women: Challenger 6; 16 players – $6,000	29–31 May	(Hong Kong) Bobo Lam; 11–8, 2–11, 13–11, 9–11, 11–3 (1st PSA title)	(Japan) Akari Midorikawa	(Hong Kong) Wai Sze Wing (South Korea) Heo Min-gyeong	(Australia) Remashree Muniandy (Australia) Erin Classen (Malaysia) Thanusaa Uthrian (South Korea) Song Chae-won
Quilter Cheviot British Open (England) Birmingham, England; Men: World Events – Diamond; 64 players – $346,500 −−−−−− Women: World Events – Diamond; 64 players – $346,500	30 May – 7 Jun.	(New Zealand) Paul Coll; 9–11, 11–3, 11–6, 0–0^{rtd.} (33rd PSA title)	(Egypt) Mostafa Asal	(Peru) Diego Elías (Egypt) Yahya Elnawasany	(Egypt) Karim Gawad (Egypt) Mohamed Zakaria (Egypt) Aly Abou Eleinen (France) Victor Crouin
Quilter Cheviot British Open (England) Birmingham, England; Men: World Events – Diamond; 64 players – $346,500 −−−−−− Women: World Events – Diamond; 64 players – $346,500	30 May – 7 Jun.	(Egypt) Amina Orfi; 7–11, 11–8, 11–5, 11–8 (13th PSA title)	(Egypt) Nour El Sherbini	(Egypt) Hania El Hammamy (Japan) Satomi Watanabe	(Egypt) Fayrouz Aboelkheir (England) Georgina Kennedy (United States) Amanda Sobhy (United States) Olivia Weaver

=== June ===
Tournament	Date	Champion	Runner-Up	Semifinalists	Quarterfinalists
Squash Project Costa Brava (Spain) Santa Cristina d'Aro, Spain; Men: Challenger 6; 32 players – $6,000 −−−−−− Women: Challenger 6; 32 players - $6,000	2–6 June	(Spain) Sergio García; 11–9, 2–11, 11–7, 8–11, 11–1 (1st PSA title)	(Egypt) Hazem Hossam	(England) Heston Malik (Czech Republic) Marek Panáček	(New Zealand) Oliver Dunbar (Australia) Dylan Molinaro (Spain) Hugo Jaén (England) Noah Meredith
Squash Project Costa Brava (Spain) Santa Cristina d'Aro, Spain; Men: Challenger 6; 32 players – $6,000 −−−−−− Women: Challenger 6; 32 players - $6,000	2–6 June	(Italy) Cristina Tartarone; 11–5, 11–9, 0–0^{rtd.} (6th PSA title)	(New Zealand) Kaitlyn Watts	(Republic of Ireland) Hannah McGugan (England) Kiera Marshall	(Spain) Ona Blasco (England) Olivia Owens (Argentina) Pilar Etchechoury (Croatia) Franka Vidović
Brasília International Squash Classic (Brazil) Brasília, Brazil; Men: Challenger 15; 32 players – $15,000 −−−−−− Women: Challenger 15; 32 players - $15,000	3–7 June	(France) Edwin Clain; 8–11, 11–9, 11–6, 11–5 (4th PSA title)	(Egypt) Marwan Assal	(Mexico) Sebastián Salazar (Egypt) Seif Tamer	(France) Joshua Phinéra (Netherlands) Rowan Damming (Colombia) Ronald Palomino (Colombia) Juan José Torres
Brasília International Squash Classic (Brazil) Brasília, Brazil; Men: Challenger 15; 32 players – $15,000 −−−−−− Women: Challenger 15; 32 players - $15,000	3–7 June	(Egypt) Ruqayya Salem; 1–11, 4–11, 11–5, 11–0, 11–6 (5th PSA title)	(Malaysia) Yee Xin Ying	(Colombia) Lucía Bautista (Malaysia) Yasshmita Jadishkumar	(Spain) Marta Domínguez (Switzerland) Ambre Allinckx (Mexico) Sarahí López (Germany) Katerina Tycova
WA Open (Australia) Mirrabooka, Australia; Men: Challenger 6; 32 players - $6,000 −−−−−− Women: Challenger 3; 16 players - $3,000	3–7 June	(Switzerland) Louai Hafez; 11–6, 11–6, 11–2 (3rd PSA title)	(Malaysia) Low Wa Sern	(Australia) Brendan MacDonald (Australia) Connor Hayes	(Japan) Shota Yasunari (Malaysia) Bryan Lim (Japan) Naoki Hayashi (South Korea) Ryu Jeong-min
WA Open (Australia) Mirrabooka, Australia; Men: Challenger 6; 32 players - $6,000 −−−−−− Women: Challenger 3; 16 players - $3,000	3–7 June	(Malaysia) Thanusaa Uthrian; 12–10, 5–11, 11–2, 11–3 (2nd PSA title)	(South Korea) Heo Min-gyeong	(Australia) Remashree Muniandy (South Korea) Song Chae-won	(Australia) Zoe Petrovansky (Australia) Erin Classen (Australia) Hannah Slyth (Australia) Pascale Louka
Bondi Open (Australia) Bondi Junction, Australia; Men: Challenger 3; 16 players – $3,000 −−−−−− Women: Challenger 3; 16 players – $3,000	9–12 June	(Malaysia) Bryan Lim; 15–13, 11–7, 11–8 (6th PSA title)	(Australia) Bradley Fullick	(Australia) Thomas Scott (Australia) David Turner	(Australia) Caleb Johnson (Malta) Kijan Sultana (Australia) Javed Ali (New Zealand) Bryce McMullen
Bondi Open (Australia) Bondi Junction, Australia; Men: Challenger 3; 16 players – $3,000 −−−−−− Women: Challenger 3; 16 players – $3,000	9–12 June	(Australia) Erin Classen; 11–7, 11–6, 10–12, 11–4 (3rd PSA title)	(Australia) Sarah Cardwell	(Australia) Lee Sze Yu (Australia) Shona Coxsedge	(Pakistan) Noor-ul-Huda (Hong Kong) Adele Fung (Pakistan) Aiman Shahbaz (Pakistan) Noor-ul-Ain Ijaz
Vendée Open (France) Challans, France; Men: Challenger 15; 32 players - $15,000	16–20 June	(France) Benjamin Aubert; 11–8, 5–11, 11–8, 11–5 (6th PSA title)	(Egypt) Mohamed Sharaf	(Egypt) Yassin ElShafei (Wales) Emyr Evans	(Hong Kong) Henry Leung (Egypt) Mohamed Gohar (France) Baptiste Bouin (Egypt) Ahmed Sobhy
2nd Guatemala Open; Guatemala City, Guatemala; Men: Challenger 15; 32 players – $15,000	16–20 June	(Guatemala) Alejandro Enríquez; 11–3, 5–11, 11–4, 11–7 (5th PSA title)	(Colombia) Ronald Palomino	(Mexico) César Salazar (Egypt) Aly Tolba	(Paraguay) Francesco Marcantonio (Guatemala) Josué Enríquez (Mexico) Alfredo Ávila (Mexico) Sebastián Salazar
Screwfix Brighton Open (England) Brighton, England; Men: Challenger 3; 16 players - $3,000	18–20 June	(England) Noah Meredith; 11–8, 11–8, 11–6 (3rd PSA title)	(England) Jared Carter	(England) Bailey Malik (England) Ronnie Hickling	(Zimbabwe) Ryan Gwidzima (England) Dylan Roberts (England) James Peach (England) Matt Gregory
Tournament	Date	Champion	Runner-Up	Semifinalists	Round Robin
PSA Squash Tour Finals (France) Paris, France; Men: PSA Squash Tour Finals; 8 players – $355,000 – Draw −−−−−− Women: PSA Squash Tour Finals; 8 players – $355,000 – Draw	17–20 June	(Peru) Diego Elías; 7–11, 11–4, 11–6, 11–9 (1st PSA Finals title) (22nd PSA title)	(New Zealand) Paul Coll	(Egypt) Mohamed Zakaria (Egypt) Mostafa Asal	(France) Victor Crouin (Wales) Joel Makin (Egypt) Karim Gawad (England) Marwan El Shorbagy
PSA Squash Tour Finals (France) Paris, France; Men: PSA Squash Tour Finals; 8 players – $355,000 – Draw −−−−−− Women: PSA Squash Tour Finals; 8 players – $355,000 – Draw	17–20 June	(Egypt) Hania El Hammamy; 11–6, 10–11, 11–8, 11–8 (2nd PSA Finals title) (22nd PSA title)	(Malaysia) Sivasangari Subramaniam	(Egypt) Amina Orfi (Egypt) Fayrouz Aboelkheir	(England) Georgina Kennedy (Egypt) Nour El Sherbini (Belgium) Tinne Gilis (Japan) Satomi Watanabe
Tournament	Date	Champion	Runner-Up	Semifinalists	Quarterfinalists
PSNS President's Trophy (Malaysia) Seri Menanti, Malaysia; Men: Challenger 6; 32 players – $6,000 −−−−−− Women: Challenger 6; 32 players – $6,000	17–21 June	(Malaysia) Siow Yee Xian; 11–2, 11–2, 7–11, 11–7 (4th PSA title)	(Malaysia) N Moganasundharam	(Malaysia) Darren Pragasam (Egypt) Hazem Hossam	(Hong Kong) Lap Man Au (Malaysia) Addeen Idrakie (Malaysia) Hafiz Abdul Harif (Hong Kong) Harley Lam
PSNS President's Trophy (Malaysia) Seri Menanti, Malaysia; Men: Challenger 6; 32 players – $6,000 −−−−−− Women: Challenger 6; 32 players – $6,000	17–21 June	(Malaysia) Sehveetrraa Kumar; 11–7, 11–9, 12–10 (4th PSA title)	(Malaysia) Whitney Wilson	(Philippines) Jemyca Aribado (Malaysia) Zoe Foo	(Malaysia) Chen Yu Jie (Malaysia) Harleein Tan (Hong Kong) Helen Tang (Egypt) Malak ElMaraghy
Woodruff-Nee Trophy (United States) Washington, D.C., United States; Men: Challenger 3; 32 players – $3,000 −−−−−− Women: Challenger 9; 16 players – $9,000	17–21 June	(United States) Tad Carney; 11–4, 11–1, 11–4 (1st PSA title)	(India) Tavneet Mundra	(Pakistan) Ahsan Ayaz (Republic of Ireland) Sean Murphy	(Nigeria) Kehinde Temitope (Brazil) Yuri Pollak (Mexico) Carlos Zendejas (United States) Nathan Rosenzweig
Woodruff-Nee Trophy (United States) Washington, D.C., United States; Men: Challenger 3; 32 players – $3,000 −−−−−− Women: Challenger 9; 16 players – $9,000	17–21 June	(Egypt) Nour Megahed; 7–11, 4–11, 11–6, 11–9, 11–2 (6th PSA title)	(Wales) Lowri Roberts	(Republic of Ireland) Breanne Flynn (United States) Isabella Tang	(United States) Elisabeth Ross (Egypt) Ingy Hammouda (Ecuador) María Paula Moya (Sweden) Moa Bönnemark
Madrid Squash Open (Spain) Tres Cantos, Spain; Men: Challenger 15; 32 players - $15,000	23–27 June	(Argentina) Leandro Romiglio; 9–11, 11–7, 18–16, 11–9 (13th PSA title)	(Czech Republic) Marek Panáček	(Spain) Sergio García (England) Will Salter	(Hong Kong) Henry Leung (Hong Kong) Matthew Lai (France) Macéo Lévy (Egypt) Mohamed Nasser
Greetings Squash PSA Challenger; Yokohama, Japan; Men : Challenger 6; 16 players – $6,000 −−−−−− Women : Challenger 6; 16 players – $6,000	24–27 June	(Japan) Naoki Hayashi; 11–5, 11–8, 11–5 (3rd PSA title)	(Hong Kong) To Wai Lok	(Japan) Tomotaka Endo (Japan) Shota Yasunari	(Hong Kong) Leo Chung (Japan) Ren Makino (Hong Kong) Lap Man Au (South Korea) Oh Seo-jin
Greetings Squash PSA Challenger; Yokohama, Japan; Men : Challenger 6; 16 players – $6,000 −−−−−− Women : Challenger 6; 16 players – $6,000	24–27 June	(Japan) Akari Midorikawa; 9–11, 11–9, 10–12, 11–6, 11–4 (4th PSA title)	(Hong Kong) Helen Tang	(South Korea) Heo Min-gyeong (South Korea) Jun Ah-in	(Hong Kong) Kirstie Wong (Hong Kong) Bobo Lam (Hong Kong) Wai Sze Wing (South Korea) Ryoo Bo-ram
Open Antibes International; Antibes, France; Men : Challenger 9; 32 players – $9,000 −−−−−− Women : Challenger 9; 32 players – $9,000	24–28 June	(France) Amir Khaled-Jousselin; 11–4, 8–11, 11–3, 11–8 (5th PSA title)	(Egypt) Ahmed Sobhy	(Egypt) Hazem Hossam (France) Benjamin Aubert	(Egypt) Mohamed Gohar (France) Manuel Paquemar (Egypt) Taha ElShafei (Egypt) Khaled Labib
Open Antibes International; Antibes, France; Men : Challenger 9; 32 players – $9,000 −−−−−− Women : Challenger 9; 32 players – $9,000	24–28 June	(France) Énora Villard; 8–11, 11–5, 12–10, 11–8 (4th PSA title)	(England) Alicia Mead	(France) Léa Barbeau (Egypt) Zeina Zein	(France) Kara Lincou (Egypt) Malak Samir (Spain) Sofía Mateos (South Africa) Hayley Ward
Gibraltar Open; Gibraltar; Men: Challenger 6; 32 players – $6,000 −−−−−− Women: Challenger 6; 32 players – $6,000	24–28 June	(Wales) Rhys Evans; 11–9, 11–3, 11–3 (3rd PSA title)	(England) Dylan Roberts	(England) Abdallah Eissa (Netherlands) Sam Gerrits	(Scotland) Rory Richmond (Austria) Aqeel Rehman (France) Axel Daujon (Netherlands) Sebastiaan Hofman
Gibraltar Open; Gibraltar; Men: Challenger 6; 32 players – $6,000 −−−−−− Women: Challenger 6; 32 players – $6,000	24–28 June	(Italy) Cristina Tartarone; 11–8, 11–6, 8–11, 11–6 (7th PSA title)	(England) Amelie Haworth	(Czech Republic) Karolína Šrámková (England) Reka Kemecsei	(Republic of Ireland) Hannah McGugan (Czech Republic) Tamara Holzbauerová (Spain) Olivia Mon (Sweden) Nathalie Malmström
Life Time Mississauga Challenger (Canada) Mississauga, Canada; Men: Challenger 6; 32 players - $6,000	24–28 June	(Nigeria) Onaopemipo Adegoke; 14–12, 11–9, 8–11, 11–6 (4th PSA title)	(Egypt) Shady El Sherbiny	(Canada) Mohammadreza Jafarzadeh (Canada) Wasey Maqsood	(Egypt) Omar Zakaria (Egypt) Mohamed Nawar (United States) Hao Cui (Canada) Carl-Edmund Roux
Maspeth Welding Steel Court Championship (United States) New York City, United States; Women: Challenger 6; 32 players – $6,000	24–28 June	(United States) Lucie Stefanoni; 11–7, 11–6, 10–12, 11–6 (2nd PSA title)	(Egypt) Nour Megahed	(United States) Laila Sedky (Barbados) Meagan Best	(United States) Charlotte Sze (Nigeria) Olatunji Busayo (Malaysia) Wen Li Lai (Hungary) Gabriella Csókási
Wodonga Open; Wodonga, Australia; Men : Challenger 3; 32 players – $3,000 −−−−−− Women : Challenger 3; 16 players – $3,000	25–28 June	(Pakistan) Anas Shah; 2–11, 11–8, 16–14, 11–5 (1st PSA title)	(Australia) Gianluca Bushell-O'Connor	(Hong Kong) Mak Tsun Hei (Australia) Tate Norris	(Sri Lanka) Shamil Wakeel (Australia) Jackson Wylie (Pakistan) Sakhiullah Tareen (Australia) Clay Canty
Wodonga Open; Wodonga, Australia; Men : Challenger 3; 32 players – $3,000 −−−−−− Women : Challenger 3; 16 players – $3,000	25–28 June	(Japan) Erisa Sano; 12–10, 11–8, 11–9 (1st PSA title)	(Macau) Gigi Yeung	(Australia) Rachael Grinham (Australia) Tina Ma	(Pakistan) Aiman Shahbaz (Australia) Amelia Brigden (Macau) Yeung Wai Leng (Pakistan) Noor-ul-Ain Ijaz
HCL PSA Challenger Tour (India) Juhu, India; Men: Challenger 15; 32 players – $15,000 −−−−−− Women: Challenger 15; 32 players – $15,000	29 Jun.–3 Jul.	(Malaysia) Syafiq Kamal; 6–11, 9–11, 11–8, 14–12, 11–8 (5th PSA title)	(Egypt) Yassin Shohdy	(Egypt) Ziad Ibrahim (India) Velavan Senthilkumar	(India) Om Semwal (Canada) Salah Eltorgman (Egypt) Abdullah Hafez (Japan) Tomotaka Endo
HCL PSA Challenger Tour (India) Juhu, India; Men: Challenger 15; 32 players – $15,000 −−−−−− Women: Challenger 15; 32 players – $15,000	29 Jun.–3 Jul.	(India) Tanvi Khanna; 8–11, 2–11, 12–10, 11–9, 11–7 (5th PSA title)	(Egypt) Farida Walid	(Japan) Akari Midorikawa (Egypt) Nour Khafagy	(India) Shameena Riaz (Malaysia) Zoe Foo (Egypt) Malak Fathy (Japan) Risa Sugimoto
PSA Club Campestre de Medellín (Colombia) Medellín, Colombia; Men: Challenger 12; 32 players - $12,000	30 Jun.–4 Jul.	(Argentina) Segundo Portabales; 11–4, 11–2, 11–3 (1st PSA title)	(Mexico) César Salazar	(Guatemala) Alejandro Enríquez (Colombia) Juan José Torres	(Mexico) César Segundo (Paraguay) Francesco Marcantonio (Mexico) Alejandro Reyes (Colombia) Juan Irisarri

=== July ===
Tournament	Date	Champion	Runner-Up	Semifinalists	Quarterfinalists
UTU Singapore Challenger; Kallang, Singapore; Men: Challenger 6; 32 players – $6,000 −−−−−− Women: Challenger 6; 32 players – $6,000	1–5 July	(Malaysia) Siow Yee Xian; 11–7, 11–5, 11–6 (5th PSA title)	(Malaysia) Low Wa Sern	(Malaysia) Hafiz Abdul Harif (Malaysia) N Moganasundharam	(Malaysia) Altamis Sallam (Singapore) Jerome Aw (Singapore) Aaron Liang (Malaysia) Harith Danial
UTU Singapore Challenger; Kallang, Singapore; Men: Challenger 6; 32 players – $6,000 −−−−−− Women: Challenger 6; 32 players – $6,000	1–5 July	(Malaysia) Thanusaa Uthrian; 8–11, 11–8, 11–4, 0–0^{rtd.} (3rd PSA title)	(Malaysia) Sehveetrraa Kumar	(Malaysia) Harleein Tan (Malaysia) Whitney Wilson	(Hong Kong) Bobo Lam (Philippines) Jemyca Aribado (South Korea) Eum Hwa-yeong (United States) Isabella Tang
Ford Bega Open (Australia) Bega, Australia; Women: Challenger 15; 32 players – $15,000	8–12 July	(Hong Kong) Tomato Ho; 11–13, 11–2, 11–5, 11–3 (6th PSA title)	(United States) Lucie Stefanoni	(Hong Kong) Cheng Nga Ching (Macau) Gigi Yeung	(Japan) Erisa Sano (Australia) Madison Lyon (New Zealand) Jena Gregory (Hong Kong) Kirstie Wong
HCL PSA Challenger Tour (India) Chennai, India; Men: Challenger 9; 32 players – $9,000 −−−−−− Women: Challenger 9; 32 players – $9,000	11–15 July	(Malaysia) Joachim Chuah; 12–10, 11–7, 11–8 (5th PSA title)	(Egypt) Adham Roshdy	(Malaysia) Syafiq Kamal (Canada) Salah Eltorgman	(Malaysia) Low Wa Sern (India) Suraj Chand (Spain) Hugo Jaén (India) Om Semwal
HCL PSA Challenger Tour (India) Chennai, India; Men: Challenger 9; 32 players – $9,000 −−−−−− Women: Challenger 9; 32 players – $9,000	11–15 July	(Egypt) Rouqaia Othman; 11–6, 10–12, 19–21, 11–7, 11–8 (2nd PSA title)	(South Korea) Eum Hwa-yeong	(Egypt) Hana Aladdin (India) Sanya Vats	(Malaysia) Thanusaa Uthrian (India) Unnati Tripathi (India) Rathika Seelan (India) Pooja Arthi
City of Devonport Tasmanian Open (Australia) Devonport, Australia; Men: Challenger 6; 32 players – $6,000 −−−−−− Women: Challenger 9; 32 players – $9,000	15–19 July	(Wales) Owain Taylor; 11–9, 9–11, 11–9, 4–11, 11–4 (3rd PSA title)	(Canada) Karim Aguib	(Australia) Thomas Scott (Egypt) Omar Helmy	(Egypt) Mahmoud Ahmed (Australia) Connor Hayes (Australia) Dylan Molinaro (Australia) Oscar Curtis
City of Devonport Tasmanian Open (Australia) Devonport, Australia; Men: Challenger 6; 32 players – $6,000 −−−−−− Women: Challenger 9; 32 players – $9,000	15–19 July	(Hong Kong) Cheng Nga Ching; 8–11, 11–7, 11–9, 6–11, 11–8 (6th PSA title)	(Hong Kong) Kirstie Wong	(Australia) Sarah Cardwell (United States) Lucie Stefanoni	(New Zealand) Ella Lash (Singapore) Au Yeong Wai Yhann (Australia) Madison Lyon (Macau) Gigi Yeung
CPG – Tortola Challenger (British Virgin Islands) Road Town, British Virgin Islands; Men: Challenger 3; 16 players – $3,000	18–21 July	(United States) Hollis Robertson; 11–5, 11–6, 11–6 (2nd PSA title)	(British Virgin Islands) Joe Chapman	(Republic of Ireland) Stu Hadden (Ukraine) Dmytro Shcherbakov	(Canada) Charles de la Riva (United States) Whit Robertson (British Virgin Islands) Daniel Henderson (British Virgin Islands) Oliver Henderson
Henri Charpentier-SGCC (Singapore) Serangoon, Singapore; Men: Challenger 6; 32 players – $6,000 −−−−−− Women: Challenger 6; 32 players – $6,000	22–26 July	(Malaysia) Syafiq Kamal; 12–10, 11–4, 1–0^{rtd.} (6th PSA title)	(Malaysia) Harith Danial	(South Korea) Ryu Jeong-min (England) James Peach	(India) Om Semwal (Malaysia) Low Wa Sern (India) Sandhesh Ravikumar (Sri Lanka) Ravindu Laksiri
Henri Charpentier-SGCC (Singapore) Serangoon, Singapore; Men: Challenger 6; 32 players – $6,000 −−−−−− Women: Challenger 6; 32 players – $6,000	22–26 July	(Malaysia) Thanusaa Uthrian; 12–10, 11–6, 11–2 (4th PSA title)	(Egypt) Malak ElMaraghy	(Philippines) Jemyca Aribado (Malaysia) Chen Yu Jie	(South Korea) Heo Min-gyeong (India) Rathika Seelan (Singapore) Au Yeong Wai Yhann (Hong Kong) Bobo Lam
Life Time Johns Creek Clemens Open (United States) Johns Creek, United States; Men: Challenger 6; 32 players – $6,000	22–26 July	(Colombia) Juan Irisarri; 11–6, 11–6, 11–5 (1st PSA title)	(Pakistan) Huzaifa Ibrahim	(Colombia) Juan José Torres (Egypt) Kareem Badawi	(Egypt) Omar Zakaria (Egypt) Taha ElShafei (Colombia) Mateo Restrepo (United States) Hart Robertson
Eastside Open (Australia) Bellerive, Australia; Men: Challenger 3; 32 players – $3,000 −−−−−− Women: Challenger 6; 32 players – $6,000	22–26 July	(Wales) Owain Taylor; 8–11, 11–8, 9–11, 11–9, 11–7 (4th PSA title)	(Canada) Karim Aguib	(Egypt) Omar Helmy (Australia) Oscar Curtis	(South Korea) Oh Seo-jin (Australia) Benjamin Ratcliffe (Australia) Jack Hudson (Australia) Connor Hayes
Eastside Open (Australia) Bellerive, Australia; Men: Challenger 3; 32 players – $3,000 −−−−−− Women: Challenger 6; 32 players – $6,000	22–26 July	(United States) Lucie Stefanoni; 11–6, 11–6, 11–5 (3rd PSA title)	(New Zealand) Ella Lash	(Australia) Erin Classen (New Zealand) Jena Gregory	(Canada) Iman Shaheen (Japan) Erisa Sano (Australia) Sarah Cardwell (New Zealand) Emma Merson
Jansher Khan-Bard Markhor Challenger (Pakistan) Islamabad, Pakistan; Men: Challenger 3; 32 players – $3,000	22–26 July	(Pakistan) Nasir Iqbal; 11–1, 11–3, 11–2 (18th PSA title)	(Pakistan) Anas Shah	(Pakistan) Mustafa Irfan (Pakistan) Muhammad Ammad	(Pakistan) Abdullah Zaman (Pakistan) Sadam ul Haq (Pakistan) Saeed Abdul (Pakistan) Muhammad Ahmed
Memorial José Luis Galán (Spain) Alboraya, Spain; Men: Challenger 3; 16 players – $3,000	30 Jul–1 Aug.	(Spain) Sergio García; 11–4, 11–6, 11–6 (2nd PSA title)	(Spain) Oriol Salvià	(England) Robert Downer (Spain) Marc Altarriba	(France) Laouenan Loaëc (Spain) Pol Asensio (Spain) Pascal Gómez (Spain) Cristian Romero
Assore Tour #1 (South Africa) Johannesburg, South Africa; Men: Challenger 6; 32 players – $6,000 −−−−−− Women: Challenger 6; 32 players – $6,000	29 Jul–2 Aug.	(Egypt) Adham Roshdy; 11–13, 11–4, 11–7, 3–1^{rtd.} (1st PSA title)	(Egypt) Seif Shenawy	(South Africa) Damian Groenewald (South Africa) Dewald van Niekerk	(South Africa) Luhann Groenewald (Egypt) Ahmed Sherif (South Africa) Judah Phillips (South Africa) Ethan Robinson
Assore Tour #1 (South Africa) Johannesburg, South Africa; Men: Challenger 6; 32 players – $6,000 −−−−−− Women: Challenger 6; 32 players – $6,000	29 Jul–2 Aug.	(Egypt) Nadia Mahmoud; 17–15, 11–7, 11–5 (1st PSA title)	(Egypt) Malak Samir	(Egypt) Amira Elrefaey (South Africa) Teagan Russell	(Egypt) Hana Aladdin (South Africa) Helena Hudson (South Africa) Lara Patrick (South Africa) Keschia Scorgie
Memorial José Luis Galán (Spain) Alboraya, Spain; Women: Challenger 3; 16 players – $3,000	31 Jul–2 Aug.	(Spain) Ona Blasco; 13–11, 8–11, 11–6, 11–3 (2nd PSA title)	(England) Amelie Haworth	(Slovenia) Pika Rupar (England) Olivia Owens	(Argentina) Paula Rivero (Spain) Montse Fajardo (Wales) Ellie Breach (England) Francesca Whyte

== Statistical information ==
The players/nations are sorted by:

1. Total number of titles;
2. Cumulated importance of those titles;
3. Alphabetical order (by family names for players).

=== Key ===
World Championship/PSA Finals
World Events Diamond
World Events Platinum
World Events Gold
World Events Silver
World Events Bronze
World Events Copper
Challenger Events 3/6/9/12/15

=== Titles won by player (men's) ===
Total	Player	World Ch. / PSA Finals	Diamond	Platinum	Gold	Silver	Bronze	Copper	Challenger 15	Challenger 12	Challenger 9	Challenger 6	Challenger 3
7	Mostafa Asal (EGY)	●	●	●●●●	●								
6	Paul Coll (NZL)		●	●	●●	●●							
6	Rowan Damming (NED)									●	●●●	●	●
5	Amir Khaled-Jousselin (FRA)										●	●●●	●
5	Siow Yee Xian (MYS)										●	●●●	●
4	Omar El Torkey (EGY)											●●●	●
4	Damian Groenewald (RSA)												●●●●
3	Victor Crouin (FRA)				●		●●						
3	Sam Osborne-Wylde (ENG)								●●●				
3	Toufik Mekhalfi (FRA)								●●	●			
3	Yassin Shohdy (EGY)									●	●●		
3	Joachim Chuah (MYS)										●●	●	
3	Macéo Lévy (FRA)										●	●●	
3	Nicholas Spizzirri (USA)											●●●	
3	Naoki Hayashi (JPN)											●●	●
3	Noah Meredith (ENG)												●●●
2	Diego Elías (PER)	●		●									
2	Karim Gawad (EGY)				●●								
2	Mohamed Zakaria (EGY)				●		●						
2	Leonel Cárdenas (MEX)							●●					
2	Noor Zaman (PAK)							●●					
2	Iván Pérez (ESP)							●	●				
2	Ashab Irfan (PAK)							●		●			
2	Salman Khalil (EGY)								●		●		
2	Finnlay Withington (ENG)								●		●		
2	Alfredo Ávila (MEX)								●			●	
2	Edwin Clain (FRA)								●			●	
2	Syafiq Kamal (MYS)								●			●	
2	Simon Herbert (ENG)									●	●		
2	Wong Chi Him (HKG)											●●	
2	Louai Hafez (SUI)											●●	
2	Seif Refaay (EGY)											●●	
2	Sergio García (ESP)											●	●
2	Heston Malik (ENG)											●	●
2	Owain Taylor (WAL)											●	●
2	Kareem Badawi (EGY)												●●
2	Jared Carter (ENG)												●●
2	Leo Chung (HKG)												●●
2	Wasey Maqsood (CAN)												●●
2	Pedro Mometto (BRA)												●●
2	Elliott Morris Devred (WAL)												●●
2	Ahmed Rashed (EGY)												●●
1	Mohamed Abouelghar (EGY)				●								
1	Marwan El Shorbagy (ENG)					●							
1	Joel Makin (WAL)					●							
1	Aly Abou Eleinen (EGY)						●						
1	Mohamed El Shorbagy (ENG)						●						
1	Timothy Brownell (USA)							●					
1	Yahya Elnawasany (EGY)							●					
1	Greg Lobban (SCO)							●					
1	Nicolas Müller (SUI)							●					
1	Miguel Á Rodríguez (COL)							●					
1	Abhay Singh (IND)							●					
1	Sam Todd (ENG)							●					
1	Yannick Wilhelmi (SUI)							●					
1	Benjamin Aubert (FRA)								●				
1	Yassin ElShafei (EGY)								●				
1	Alejandro Enríquez (GUA)								●				
1	Sanjay Jeeva (MYS)								●				
1	Ronald Palomino (COL)								●				
1	George Parker (ENG)								●				
1	Leandro Romiglio (ARG)								●				
1	Patrick Rooney (ENG)								●				
1	Velavan Senthilkumar (IND)								●				
1	Mohamed Sharaf (EGY)								●				
1	Dewald van Niekerk (RSA)								●				
1	David Bernet (SUI)									●			
1	Diego Gobbi (BRA)									●			
1	Mohamed Nasser (EGY)									●			
1	Segundo Portabales (ARG)									●			
1	Tom Walsh (ENG)									●			
1	Marwan Assal (EGY)										●		
1	Veer Chotrani (IND)										●		
1	Ibrahim Elkabbani (EGY)										●		
1	Emyr Evans (WAL)										●		
1	Matthew Lai (HKG)										●		
1	Perry Malik (ENG)										●		
1	Onaopemipo Adegoke (NGR)											●	
1	Suraj Chand (IND)											●	
1	Oliver Dunbar (NZL)											●	
1	Tomotaka Endo (JPN)											●	
1	Rhys Evans (WAL)											●	
1	Abdullah Hafez (EGY)											●	
1	Juan Irisarri (COL)											●	
1	Nathan Kueh (MYS)											●	
1	Duncan Lee (MYS)											●	
1	Adham Roshdy (EGY)											●	
1	Omar Said (EGY)											●	
1	Yusuf Sheikh (ENG)											●	
1	Marwan Tamer (EGY)											●	
1	Hana Aladdin (EGY)												●
1	Tayyab Aslam (PAK)												●
1	Omar Azzam (EGY)												●
1	Álvaro Buenaño (ECU)												●
1	Tad Carney (USA)												●
1	Oscar Curtis (AUS)												●
1	Hasanain Dakheel (IRQ)												●
1	Taha ElShafei (EGY)												●
1	Salah Eltorgman (CAN)												●
1	Ali El Toukhy (EGY)												●
1	Tang Ming Hong (HKG)												●
1	Nasir Iqbal (PAK)												●
1	Asim Khan (PAK)												●
1	Bryan Lim (MYS)												●
1	Bransten Ming (USA)												●
1	Conor Moran (IRE)												●
1	Darren Pragasam (MYS)												●
1	Aqeel Rehman (AUT)												●
1	Hollis Robertson (USA)												●
1	Youssef Roushdy (EGY)												●
1	Youssef Sarhan (CAN)												●
1	Anas Shah (PAK)												●
1	Ahmed Sobhy (EGY)												●
1	Jakub Solnický (CZE)												●
1	Benedek Takács (HUN)												●
1	Low Wa Sern (MYS)												●

=== Titles won by nation (men's) ===
Total	Nation	World Ch. / PSA Finals	Diamond	Platinum	Gold	Silver	Bronze	Copper	Challenger 15	Challenger 12	Challenger 9	Challenger 6	Challenger 3
44	Egypt (EGY)	●	●	●●●●	●●●●●		●●	●	●●●	●●	●●●●●	●●●●●●●●●	●●●●●●●●●●●
22	England (ENG)					●	●	●	●●●●●●	●●	●●●	●●	●●●●●●
17	France (FRA)				●		●●		●●●●	●	●●	●●●●●●	●
16	Malaysia (MYS)								●●		●●●	●●●●●●●	●●●●
8	Pakistan (PAK)							●●●		●			●●●●
7	New Zealand (NZL)		●	●	●●	●●						●	
7	Wales (WAL)					●					●	●●	●●●
7	United States (USA)							●				●●●	●●●
6	Netherlands (NED)									●	●●●	●	●
6	Hong Kong (HKG)										●	●●	●●●
5	Switzerland (SUI)							●●		●		●●	
5	South Africa (RSA)								●				●●●●
4	Mexico (MEX)							●●	●			●	
4	India (IND)							●	●		●	●	
4	Spain (ESP)							●	●			●	●
4	Japan (JPN)											●●●	●
4	Canada (CAN)												●●●●
3	Colombia (COL)							●	●			●	
3	Brazil (BRA)									●			●●
2	Peru (PER)	●		●									
2	Argentina (ARG)								●	●			
1	Scotland (SCO)							●					
1	Guatemala (GUA)								●				
1	Nigeria (NGR)											●	
1	Australia (AUS)												●
1	Austria (AUT)												●
1	Czech Republic (CZE)												●
1	Ecuador (ECU)												●
1	Hungary (HUN)												●
1	Iraq (IRQ)												●
1	Ireland (IRE)												●

=== Titles won by player (women's) ===
Total	Player	World Ch. / PSA Finals	Diamond	Platinum	Gold	Silver	Bronze	Copper	Challenger 15	Challenger 12	Challenger 9	Challenger 6	Challenger 3
7	Hania El Hammamy (EGY)	●	●	●●●●	●								
6	Amina Orfi (EGY)	●	●		●●●	●							
4	Anahat Singh (IND)						●	●	●●				
4	Ruqayya Salem (EGY)								●●	●	●		
4	Thanusaa Uthrian (MYS)											●●	●●
3	Nour El Sherbini (EGY)			●●	●								
3	Fayrouz Aboelkheir (EGY)					●●	●						
3	Chan Sin Yuk (HKG)							●	●●				
3	Nadien Elhammamy (EGY)							●	●		●		
3	Amina El Rihany (EGY)								●		●	●	
3	Cristina Tartarone (ITA)											●●●	
3	Farida Walid (EGY)											●●●	
2	Sivasangari Subramaniam (MYS)				●●								
2	Olivia Weaver (USA)				●	●							
2	Sabrina Sobhy (USA)							●●					
2	Marta Domínguez (ESP)								●●				
2	Lauren Baltayan (FRA)								●		●		
2	Tanvi Khanna (IND)								●		●		
2	Jana Swaify (EGY)									●●			
2	Franka Vidović (CRO)									●			●
2	Sohayla Hazem (EGY)										●●		
2	Nour Megahed (EGY)										●	●	
2	Rouqaia Othman (EGY)										●	●	
2	Jana Safy (EGY)										●		●
2	Heylie Fung (HKG)											●●	
2	Ena Kwong (HKG)											●●	
2	Lucie Stefanoni (USA)											●●	
2	Zeina Zein (EGY)											●●	
2	Malak Fathy (EGY)											●	●
2	Asia Harris (ENG)											●	●
2	Ona Blasco (ESP)												●●
2	Breanne Flynn (IRE)												●●
2	Zoe Foo (MYS)												●●
2	Lojayn Gohary (EGY)												●●
1	Tinne Gilis (BEL)					●							
1	Amanda Sobhy (USA)					●							
1	Satomi Watanabe (JPN)					●							
1	Jasmine Hutton (ENG)						●						
1	Georgia Adderley (SCO)							●					
1	Mélissa Alves (FRA)							●					
1	Habiba Hani (EGY)							●					
1	Lucy Turmel (ENG)							●					
1	Ainaa Amani (MYS)								●				
1	Joshna Chinappa (IND)								●				
1	Nardine Garas (EGY)								●				
1	Tomato Ho (HKG)								●				
1	Caroline Fouts (USA)									●			
1	Nour Khafagy (EGY)										●		
1	Cheng Nga Ching (HKG)										●		
1	Malak Taha (EGY)										●		
1	Énora Villard (FRA)										●		
1	Yasshmita Jadishkumar (MYS)											●	
1	Sehveetrraa Kumar (MYS)											●	
1	Bobo Lam (HKG)											●	
1	Nadia Mahmoud (EGY)											●	
1	Akari Midorikawa (JPN)											●	
1	Margot Prow (BAR)											●	
1	Lowri Roberts (WAL)											●	
1	Noa Romero (ESP)											●	
1	Karina Tyma (POL)											●	
1	Menna Walid (EGY)											●	
1	Hayley Ward (RSA)											●	
1	Kirstie Wong (HKG)											●	
1	Talia Zakaria (EGY)											●	
1	Jemyca Aribado (PHI)												●
1	Ellie Breach (WAL)												●
1	Caridad Buenaño (ECU)												●
1	Armona Cheung (HKG)												●
1	Erin Classen (AUS)												●
1	Amira Elrefaey (EGY)												●
1	Teagan Russell (RSA)												●
1	Erisa Sano (JPN)												●
1	Rathika Seelan (IND)												●
1	Iman Shaheen (CAN)												●
1	Laura Silva (BRA)												●
1	Emilia Soini (FIN)												●
1	Karolína Šrámková (CZE)												●
1	Charlotte Sze (USA)												●
1	Harleein Tan (MYS)												●
1	Nikki Todd (CAN)												●
1	Sanya Vats (IND)												●

=== Titles won by nation (women's) ===
Total	Nation	World Ch. / PSA Finals	Diamond	Platinum	Gold	Silver	Bronze	Copper	Challenger 15	Challenger 12	Challenger 9	Challenger 6	Challenger 3
56	Egypt (EGY)	●●	●●	●●●●●●	●●●●●	●●●	●	●●	●●●●●	●●●	●●●●●●●●●●	●●●●●●●●●●●●	●●●●●
12	Hong Kong (HKG)							●	●●●		●	●●●●●●	●
12	Malaysia (MYS)				●●				●			●●●●	●●●●●
9	United States (USA)				●	●●		●●		●		●●	●
9	India (IND)						●	●	●●●●		●		●●
5	Spain (ESP)								●●			●	●●
4	England (ENG)						●	●				●	●
4	France (FRA)							●	●		●●		
3	Japan (JPN)					●						●	●
3	Italy (ITA)											●●●	
2	Croatia (CRO)									●			●
2	South Africa (RSA)											●	●
2	Wales (WAL)											●	●
2	Canada (CAN)												●●
2	Ireland (IRE)												●●
1	Belgium (BEL)					●							
1	Scotland (SCO)							●					
1	Barbados (BAR)											●	
1	Poland (POL)											●	
1	Australia (AUS)												●
1	Brazil (BRA)												●
1	Czech Republic (CZE)												●
1	Ecuador (ECU)												●
1	Finland (FIN)												●
1	Philippines (PHI)												●

== Retirements ==
Following is a list of notable players (winners of a main tour title, and/or part of the PSA Men's World Rankings and Women's World Rankings top 30 for at least one month) who announced their retirement from professional squash, became inactive, or were permanently banned from playing, during the 2025–26 season:

- Omar Mosaad
- George Parker
- Tesni Murphy
- Danielle Ray

== Current world top 10 players ==
=== Men's world ranking ===
PSA Men's World Rankings as of 1 September 2025
Rank	Player	Points	Move^{†}
1	Mostafa Asal (EGY)	2,338	Steady
2	Diego Elías (PER)	1,631	Steady
3	Paul Coll (NZL)	1,153	Steady
4	Joel Makin (WAL)	1,096	Steady
5	Marwan Elshorbagy (ENG)	847	Steady
6	Karim Gawad (EGY)	811	Steady
7	Mohamed Elshorbagy (ENG)	794	Steady
8	Youssef Soliman (EGY)	616	Steady
9	Aly Abou Eleinen (EGY)	580	Steady
10	Youssef Ibrahim (EGY)	578	Steady

=== Women's world ranking ===
PSA Women's World Rankings, of the 5 January 2026
Rank	Player	Average	Move^{†}
1	Hania El Hammamy (EGY)	1,791	Steady
2	Nouran Gohar (EGY)	1,578	Steady
3	Amina Orfi (EGY)	1,455	Steady
4	Nour El Sherbini (EGY)	1,324	Steady
5	Olivia Weaver (USA)	1,284	Steady
6	Satomi Watanabe (JPN)	881	Steady
7	Sivasangari Subramaniam (MAS)	869	Steady
8	Tinne Gilis (BEL)	755	Steady
9	Fayrouz Aboelkheir (EGY)	753	Steady
10	Georgina Kennedy (ENG)	741	Steady

== See also ==
- 2025–26 PSA World Events Finals
- 2026 Men's PSA World Events Finals
- 2026 Women's PSA World Events Finals
- 2025 in squash
- 2026 in squash
