= 2025 Men's World Squash Championship =

Squash tournament in Chicago

- 46th Men's World Squash Championship
- Location: Chicago, United States
- Venue: University Club of Chicago; Lakeshore Sport & Fitness
- Date: 9–18 May 2025
- Website https://worldsquashchamps.com/
- Category: PSA World Championships
- Prize money: $600,000

Results
- Champion: (Egypt) Mostafa Asal
- Runner-up: (Egypt) Ali Farag
- Semi-finalists: (Peru) Diego Elías (New Zealand) Paul Coll

The 2025 Men's World Squash Championship was the 2025 men's edition of the World Squash Championships, which served as the individual world championship for squash players. The event took place in Chicago, United States, from 9 to 18 May 2025. It was the fourth time that Chicago hosts the PSA World Championships, having previously hosted the 2019, 2021 & 2023 editions.

Mostafa Asal won his first world title defeating four-time world champion Ali Farag in the final. Asal did not lose a game throughout the tournament and the best that his opponents could manage was scoring an 8-point game. The last player to go through a world championship unbeaten (in games) was Jahangir Khan in the 1988.

== Venues ==
University Club of Chicago and Lakeshore Sport & Fitness are the two venues that host the competition.

== Seeds ==
Click on the seed number of a player to go to their draw section.

1. (Egypt) Ali Farag
2. (Egypt) Mostafa Asal
3. (Peru) Diego Elías (Semifinals)
4. (New Zealand) Paul Coll (Semifinals)
5. (Egypt) Tarek Momen (Quarterfinals)
6. (Egypt) Karim Abdel Gawad (Quarterfinals)
7. (England) Mohamed Elshorbagy (Quarterfinals)
8. (England) Marwan Elshorbagy (Third round)

9. (Egypt) Youssef Soliman (Quarterfinals)
10. (Malaysia) Eain Yow Ng (Third round)
11. (Egypt) Aly Abou Eleinen (Third round)
12. (Egypt) Youssef Ibrahim (Third round)
13. (France) Victor Crouin (Third round)
14. (Egypt) Fares Dessouky (Second round)
15. (Mexico) Leonel Cárdenas (Third round)
16. (Switzerland) Dimitri Steinmann (Third round)

== Draw and results ==
=== Key ===
- rtd. = Retired
- Q = Qualifier
- WC = Host wild card
- w/o = Walkover

=== Finals ===
Semi finals
1	(Egypt) Ali Farag	11	11	11
3	(Peru) Diego Elías	5	4	5
4	(New Zealand) Paul Coll	5	5	4
2	(Egypt) Mostafa Asal	11	11	11

Final
1	(Egypt) Ali Farag	7	8	3
2	(Egypt) Mostafa Asal	11	11	11

=== Top half ===
==== Section 1 ====
First round
1	(Egypt) Ali Farag	12	11	11
(Spain) Bernat Jaume	10	9	4
17/32	(England) Declan James	9	11	10	14
Q	(India) Veer Chotrani	11	9	12	16
Q	(South Africa) Dewald van Niekerk	11	7	3
17/32	(England) Curtis Malik	13	11	11
Q	(Australia) Rhys Dowling	5	6	6
15	(Mexico) Leonel Cárdenas	11	11	11
14	(Egypt) Fares Dessouky	11	11	11
(Argentina) Leandro Romiglio	5	9	3
17/32	(Egypt) Mohamed Abouelghar	10	11	8	4
(England) Jonah Bryant	12	8	11	11
(Portugal) Rui Soares	7	6	7
17/32	(France) Grégoire Marche	11	11	11
(England) Adrian Waller	11	4	4	8
5	(Egypt) Tarek Momen	9	11	11	11

Second round
1	(Egypt) Ali Farag	7	11	11	12
Q	(India) Veer Chotrani	11	7	3	10
17/32	(England) Curtis Malik	7	13	5
15	(Mexico) Leonel Cárdenas	11	15	11
14	(Egypt) Fares Dessouky	11	10	6	1
(England) Jonah Bryant	5	12	11	11
17/32	(France) Grégoire Marche	12	11	9	10	8
5	(Egypt) Tarek Momen	10	8	11	12	11

Third Round
1	(Egypt) Ali Farag	w/o
15	(Mexico) Leonel Cárdenas
(England) Jonah Bryant	9	7	7
5	(Egypt) Tarek Momen	11	11	11

Quarter finals
1	(Egypt) Ali Farag	11	11	11
5	(Egypt) Tarek Momen	8	8	4

==== Section 2 ====
First round
8	(England) Marwan El Shorbagy	12	11	11
(Egypt) Karim El Hammamy	10	9	8
17/32	(India) Ramit Tandon	10	11	13	11
(Japan) Ryūnosuke Tsukue	12	7	11	7
(Egypt) Omar Mosaad	11	11	11
17/32	(Egypt) Mohamed ElSherbini	4	5	4
(Malaysia) Sanjay Jeeva	5	6	6
9	(Egypt) Youssef Soliman	11	11	11
12	(Egypt) Youssef Ibrahim	12	11	11	9	11
(Egypt) Yahya Elnawasany	10	13	5	11	6
17/32	(Switzerland) Nicolas Müller	7	11	7	6
(India) Abhay Singh	11	2	11	11
(Hungary) Balasz Farkas	4	11	8	4
17/32	(Colombia) Miguel Rodríguez	11	3	11	11
(India) Velavan Senthilkumar	11	7	5	3
3	(Peru) Diego Elías	7	11	11	11

Second round
8	(England) Marwan El Shorbagy	11	11	5	8	11
17/32	(India) Ramit Tandon	9	7	11	11	8
(Egypt) Omar Mosaad	2	8	5
9	(Egypt) Youssef Soliman	11	11	11
12	(Egypt) Youssef Ibrahim	11	11	11
(India) Abhay Singh	6	6	9
17/32	(Colombia) Miguel Rodríguez	5	8	5
3	(Peru) Diego Elías	11	11	11

Third Round
8	(England) Marwan El Shorbagy	11	9	11	0
9	(Egypt) Youssef Soliman	5	11	13	11
12	(Egypt) Youssef Ibrahim	8	0	7
3	(Peru) Diego Elías	11	11	11

Quarter finals
9	(Egypt) Youssef Soliman	8	1	8
3	(Peru) Diego Elías	11	11	11

=== Bottom half ===
==== Section 3 ====
First round
4	(New Zealand) Paul Coll	11	11	11
(Hong Kong) Henry Leung	1	5	3
17/32	(Spain) Iker Pajares	10	11	6	7
Q	(France) Melvil Scianimanico	12	9	11	11
(Hong Kong) Alex Lau	11	4	12	11	15
17/32	(France) Baptiste Masotti	5	11	14	1	17
(Colombia) Juan Camilo Vargas	4	4	5
13	(France) Victor Crouin	11	11	11
16	(Switzerland) Dimitri Steinmann	9	11	11	11
(England) George Parker	11	6	8	4
17/32	(United States) Timmy Brownell	11	9	5	11	5
(United States) Shahjahan Khan	5	11	11	8	11
(Scotland) Rory Stewart	8	8	3
17/32	(Egypt) Mohamed Zakaria	11	11	11
(England) Nathan Lake	5	11	11	8	3
7	(England) Mohamed Elshorbagy	11	6	4	11	11

Second round
4	(New Zealand) Paul Coll	11	11	11
Q	(France) Melvil Scianimanico	3	3	2
17/32	(France) Baptiste Masotti	11	4	5	8
13	(France) Victor Crouin	8	11	11	11
16	(Switzerland) Dimitri Steinmann	6	11	11	11
(United States) Shahjahan Khan	11	9	7	9
17/32	(Egypt) Mohamed Zakaria	7	8	7
7	(England) Mohamed Elshorbagy	11	11	11

Third Round
4	(New Zealand) Paul Coll	11	11	11
13	(France) Victor Crouin	6	4	9
16	(Switzerland) Dimitri Steinmann	11	11	9	6	8
7	(England) Mohamed Elshorbagy	9	8	11	11	11

Quarter finals
4	(New Zealand) Paul Coll	11	11	11
7	(England) Mohamed Elshorbagy	4	9	2

==== Section 4 ====
First round
6	(Egypt) Karim Abdel Gawad	7	11	11	6	11
(England) Simon Herbert	11	4	9	11	7
17/32	(Qatar) Abdulla Al-Tamimi	10	11	11	4	7
Q	(Pakistan) Noor Zaman	12	4	8	11	11
Q	(Colombia) Matías Knudsen	9	9	11	11	11
(Scotland) Greg Lobban	11	11	4	4	7
(Switzerland) Yannick Wilhelmi	6	11	4	10
11	(Egypt) Aly Abou Eleinen	11	2	11	12
10	(Malaysia) Eain Yow Ng	11	11	11
(England) Patrick Rooney	8	5	6
17/32	(France) Auguste Dussourd	9	11	10	11	2
(Pakistan) Muhammad Asim Khan	11	7	12	7	11
Q	(United States) Nicholas Spizzirri	9	6	3
16/32	(Germany) Raphael Kandra	11	11	11
(England) Nick Wall	4	3	7
2	(Egypt) Mostafa Asal	11	11	11

Second round
6	(Egypt) Karim Abdel Gawad	11	11	11
Q	(Pakistan) Noor Zaman	5	7	9
Q	(Colombia) Matías Knudsen	6	6	4
11	(Egypt) Aly Abou Eleinen	11	11	11
10	(Malaysia) Eain Yow Ng	11	11	11
(Pakistan) Muhammad Asim Khan	4	2	4
16/32	(Germany) Raphael Kandra	3	5	2
2	(Egypt) Mostafa Asal	11	11	11

Third Round
6	(Egypt) Karim Abdel Gawad	8	11	0
11	(Egypt) Aly Abou Eleinen	11	0	0^{r}
10	(Malaysia) Eain Yow Ng	4	6	7
2	(Egypt) Mostafa Asal	11	11	11

Quarter finals
6	(Egypt) Karim Abdel Gawad	7	4	8
2	(Egypt) Mostafa Asal	11	11	11

== Schedule ==
Times are Central Daylight Time (UTC−05:00). To the best of five games.

Abbreviations:

- UCC - University Club of Chicago
- LSF - Lakeshore Sport & Fitness

=== Round 1 ===
Friday, 9 May

Date	Court	Time	Player 1	Player 2	Score						
9 May	UCC, Court 1	12:30	Ryūnosuke Tsukue (JPN)	Ramit Tandon (IND)	12–10, 7–11, 11–13, 7–11						
9 May	UCC, Court 2	12:30	Abhay Singh (IND)	Nicolas Müller (SUI)	11–7, 2–11, 11–7, 11–6						
9 May	UCC, Court 1	13:15	Marwan Elshorbagy (EGY)	Karim El Hammamy (EGY)	12–10, 11–9, 11–8						
9 May	UCC, Court 2	13:15	Youssef Ibrahim (EGY)	Yahya Elnawasany (EGY)	12–10, 11–13, 11–5, 9–11, 11–6						
9 May	UCC, Court 3	13:15	Mohamed ElSherbini (EGY)	Omar Mosaad (EGY)	4–11, 5–11, 4–11	9 May	UCC, Court 3	14:00	Youssef Soliman (EGY)	Sanjay Jeeva (MAS)	11–5, 11–6, 11–6
9 May	UCC, Court 1	16:30	Miguel Á Rodríguez (COL)	Balasz Farkas (HUN)	11–4, 3–11, 11–8, 11–4						
9 May	UCC, Court 2	16:30	Velavan Senthilkumar (IND)	Diego Elías (PER)	11–7, 7–11, 5–11, 3–11						
9 May	UCC, Court 1	17:15	Adrian Waller (ENG)	Tarek Momen (EGY)	11–9, 4–11, 4–11, 8–11						
9 May	UCC, Court 2	17:15	Ali Farag (EGY)	Bernat Jaume (ESP)	12–10, 11–9, 11–4						
9 May	UCC, Court 3	17:15	Veer Chotrani (IND)	Declan James (ENG)	11–9, 9–11, 12–10, 16–14						
9 May	UCC, Court 3	18:00	Fares Dessouky (EGY)	Leandro Romiglio (ARG)	11–5, 11–9, 11–3						
9 May	UCC, Court 1	18:45	Grégoire Marche (FRA)	Rui Soares (POR)	11–7, 11–6, 11–7						
9 May	UCC, Court 2	18:45	Rhys Dowling (AUS)	Leonel Cárdenas (MEX)							
9 May	UCC, Court 2	19:30	Curtis Malik (ENG)	Dewald van Niekerk (RSA)	13–11, 11–7, 11–3						
9 May	UCC, Court 3	19:30	Jonah Bryant (ENG)	Mohamed Abouelghar (EGY)	12–10, 8–11, 11–8, 11–4						

——————————————————————————————————————————————————————————————————————————————————————————————————————————

Saturday, 10 May

Date	Court	Time	Player 1	Player 2	Score
10 May	UCC, Court 1	12:30	Matías Knudsen (COL)	Fares Dessouky (EGY)	9–11, 9–11, 11–4, 11–4, 11–7
10 May	UCC, Court 2	12:30	Muhammad Asim Khan (PAK)	Auguste Dussourd (FRA)	11–9, 7–11, 12–10, 7–11, 11–2
10 May	UCC, Court 1	13:15	Aly Abou Eleinen (EGY)	Yannick Wilhelmi (SUI)	11–6, 2–11, 11–4, 12–10
10 May	UCC, Court 2	13:15	Eain Yow Ng (MAS)	Patrick Rooney (ENG)	11–8, 11–5, 11–6
10 May	UCC, Court 3	13:15	Mohamed Elshorbagy (ENG)	Nathan Lake (ENG)	11–5, 6–11, 4–11, 11–8, 11–3
10 May	UCC, Court 3	14:00	Mohamed Zakaria (EGY)	Rory Stewart (SCO)	11–8, 11–8, 11–3
10 May	UCC, Court 1	16:30	Karim Abdel Gawad (EGY)	Simon Herbert (ENG)	7–11, 11–4, 11–9, 6–11, 11–7
10 May	UCC, Court 2	16:30	Victor Crouin (FRA)	Juan Camilo Vargas (COL)	11–4, 11–4, 11–5
10 May	UCC, Court 1	17:15	Paul Coll (NZL)	Henry Leung (HKG)	11–5, 11–1, 11–3
10 May	UCC, Court 2	17:15	Baptiste Masotti (FRA)	Alex Lau (HKG)	5–11, 11–4, 14–12, 1–11, 17–15
10 May	UCC, Court 3	16:45	Noor Zaman (PAK)	Abdulla Al-Tamimi (QAT)	12–10, 4–11, 8–11, 11–4, 11–7
10 May	UCC, Court 3	18:00	Dimitri Steinmann (SUI)	George Parker (ENG)	9–11, 11–6, 11–8, 11–4
10 May	UCC, Court 1	18:45	Melvil Scianimanico (FRA)	Iker Parajes (ESP)	12–10, 9–11, 11–6, 11–7
10 May	UCC, Court 2	18:45	Raphael Kandra (GER)	Nicholas Spizzirri (USA)	11–9, 11–6, 11–3
10 May	UCC, Court 2	19:30	Mostafa Asal (EGY)	Nick Wall (ENG)	11–4, 11–3, 11–7
10 May	UCC, Court 3	19:30	Shahjahan Khan (USA)	Timothy Brownell (USA)	5–11, 11–9, 11–5, 8–11, 11–5

=== Round 2 ===
Sunday, 11 May

Date	Court	Time	Player 1	Player 2	Score
11 May	UCC, Court 1	13:30	Marwan Elshorbagy (EGY)	Ramit Tandon (IND)	11–9, 11–7, 5–11, 8–11, 11–8
11 May	UCC, Court 2	13:30	Youssef Ibrahim (EGY)	Abhay Singh (IND)	11–6, 11–6, 11–9
11 May	UCC, Court 3	13:15	Youssef Soliman (EGY)	Omar Mosaad (EGY)	11–2, 11–8, 11–5
11 May	LSF, Glass Court	14:00	Diego Elías (PER)	Miguel Á Rodríguez (COL)	11–5, 11–8, 11–5
11 May	UCC, Court 1	14:15	Tarek Momen (EGY)	Grégoire Marche (FRA)	10–12, 8–11, 11–9, 12–10, 11–8
11 May	UCC, Court 2	14:15	Leonel Cárdenas (MEX)	Curtis Malik (ENG)	11–7, 15–13, 11–5
11 May	UCC, Court 3	14:15	Fares Dessouky (EGY)	Jonah Bryant (ENG)	11–5, 10–12, 6–11, 1–11
11 May	LSF, Glass Court	14:45	Ali Farag (EGY)	Veer Chotrani (IND)	7–11, 11–7, 11–3, 12–10
11 May	UCC, Court 2	16:45	Eain Yow Ng (MAS)	Muhammad Asim Khan (PAK)	11–4, 11–2, 11–4
11 May	UCC, Court 1	17:30	Aly Abou Eleinen (EGY)	Matías Knudsen (COL)	11–6, 11–6, 11–4
11 May	UCC, Court 2	17:30	Victor Crouin (FRA)	Baptiste Masotti (FRA)	8–11, 11–4, 11–5, 11–8
11 May	UCC, Court 3	18:45	Karim Abdel Gawad (EGY)	Noor Zaman (PAK)	11–5, 11–7, 11–9
11 May	LSF, Glass Court	17:30	Mostafa Asal (EGY)	Raphael Kandra (GER)	11–3, 11–5, 11–2
11 May	UCC, Court 1	18:15	Paul Coll (NZL)	Melvil Scianimanico (FRA)	11–3, 11–3, 11–3
11 May	UCC, Court 3	18:15	Dimitri Steinmann (SUI)	Shahjahan Khan (USA)	6–11, 11–9, 11–7, 11–9
11 May	LSF, Glass Court	19:00	Mohamed Elshorbagy (EGY)	Mohamed Zakaria (EGY)	11–7, 11–8, 11–7

=== Round 3 ===
Monday, 12 May & Tuesday, 13 May

Date	Court	Time	Player 1	Player 2	Score
12 May	LSF, Glass Court	14:00	Marwan Elshorbagy (EGY)	Youssef Soliman (EGY)	11–5, 9–11, 11–13, 0–11
12 May	LSF, Glass Court	14:45	Youssef Ibrahim (EGY)	Diego Elías (PER)	8–11, 0–11, 7–11
12 May	LSF, Glass Court	19:30	Ali Farag (EGY)	Leonel Cárdenas (MEX)	w/o
12 May	LSF, Glass Court	20:30	Jonah Bryant (ENG)	Tarek Momen (EGY)	9–11, 7–11, 7–11
13 May	LSF, Glass Court	14:00	Karim Abdel Gawad (EGY)	Aly Abou Eleinen (EGY)	8–11, 11–0 ret.
13 May	LSF, Glass Court	14:45	Mostafa Asal (EGY)	Eain Yow Ng (MAS)	11–4, 11–6, 11–7
13 May	LSF, Glass Court	19:30	Paul Coll (NZL)	Victor Crouin (FRA)	11–6, 11–4, 11–9
13 May	LSF, Glass Court	20:30	Mohamed Elshorbagy (ENG)	Dimitri Steinmann (SUI)	9–11, 8–11, 11–9, 11–6, 11–8

=== Quarter-finals ===
Wednesday, 14 May & Thursday 15 May

Date	Court	Time	Player 1	Player 2	Score
14 May	LSF, Glass Court	19:30	Ali Farag (EGY)	Tarek Momen (EGY)	11–8, 11–8, 11–4
14 May	LSF, Glass Court	20:30	Diego Elías (PER)	Youssef Soliman (EGY)	11–8, 11–1, 11–8
15 May	LSF, Glass Court	19:30	Mostafa Asal (EGY)	Karim Abdel Gawad (EGY)	11–7, 11–4, 11–8
15 May	LSF, Glass Court	20:30	Paul Coll (NZL)	Mohamed Elshorbagy (ENG)	11–4, 11–9, 11–2

=== Semi-finals ===
Friday, 16 May

Date	Court	Time	Player 1	Player 2	Score
16 May	LSF, Glass Court	19:30	Ali Farag (EGY)	Diego Elías (PER)	11–5, 11–4, 11–5
16 May	LSF, Glass Court	20:15	Mostafa Asal (EGY)	Paul Coll (NZL)	11–5, 11–5, 11–4

=== Final ===
Saturday, 17 May

Date	Court	Time	Player 1	Player 2	Score
17 May	LSF, Glass Court	18:45	Ali Farag (EGY)	Mostafa Asal (EGY)	7–11, 8–11, 3–11

== Representation ==
This table shows the number of players by country in the 2024 PSA Men's World Championship. A total of 23 nationalities are represented. Egypt is the most represented nation with 14 players.

	(Egypt) EGY	(New Zealand) NZL	(Peru) PER	(England) ENG	(France) FRA	(Malaysia) MAS	(Mexico) MEX	(Switzerland) SUI	(India) IND	(Colombia) COL	(Pakistan) PAK	(Germany) GER	(United States) USA	(Argentina) ARG	(Australia) AUS	(Spain) ESP	(Hong Kong) HKG	(Hungary) HUN	(Japan) JPN	(Portugal) POR	(Qatar) QAT	(South Africa) RSA	(Scotland) SCO	Total
Final	2																							2
Semi-final	2	1	1																					4
Quarter-final	5	1	1	1																				8
Round 3	7	1	1	3	1	1	1	1																16
Round 2	10	1	1	4	4	1	1	1	3	2	2	1	1											32
Round 1	14	1	1	11	5	2	1	3	4	3	2	1	3	1	1	2	2	1	1	1	1	1	2	64

== See also ==
- World Squash Championships
- 2025 Women's World Squash Championship

Preceded by Cairo, Egypt; 2024	PSA World Championships; Chicago, United States; 2025	Succeeded by TBA; 2026
