= 2022 PSA Men's World Squash Championship =

2022 Men's World Championship
- 43rd PSA Men's World Squash Championship
- Location: Cairo, Egypt
- Venue: Club S Allegria; National Museum of Egyptian Civilization
- Date: 13–22 May 2022
- Website https://worldsquashchamps.com/
- Category: PSA World Championships
- Prize money: $550,000

Results
- Champion: (Egypt) Ali Farag
- Runner-up: (Egypt) Mohamed El Shorbagy
- Semi-finalists: (New Zealand) Paul Coll (Egypt) Mostafa Asal

The 2022 PSA Men's World Squash Championship was the 2022 men's edition of the World Squash Championships, which served as the individual world championship for squash players. The event took place in Cairo, Egypt from 13 to 22 May 2022. It was the fifth time that Cairo host the PSA World Championships after 1985, 1999, 2006 & 2016 editions.

Egyptian Ali Farag won the World title for the third time.

== World ranking points/prize money ==
PSA also awards points towards World ranking. Points are awarded as follows:

PSA World Squash Championships		Ranking Points						
Rank	Prize money US$	Winner	Runner up	3/4	5/8	9/16	17/32	33/64
World Squash Championships	$550,000	3175	2090	1270	780	475	290	177.5

=== Prize money breakdown ===
Total prize money for the tournament is $1,100,000, $550,000 per gender. This is about a 9% prize fund increase from previous World Championships (2020–21; $500,000 per gender).

Position (num. of players)		% breakdown	Prize money (Total: $550,000)
Winner	(1)	16%	$88,000
Runner-up	(1)	10%	$55,000
3/4	(2)	6%	$33,000
5/8	(4)	3.50%	$19,250
9/16	(8)	2.10%	$11,550
17/32	(16)	1.20%	$6,600
33/64	(32)	0.75%	$4,125

== Seeds ==
Click on the seed number of a player to go to their draw section.

1. (New Zealand) Paul Coll (semi finals)
2. (Egypt) Ali Farag (champion)
3. (Egypt) Mohamed El Shorbagy (finals)
4. (Egypt) Mostafa Asal (semi finals)
5. (Peru) Diego Elías (quarter finals)
6. (Egypt) Tarek Momen (quarter finals)
7. (Egypt) Marwan El Shorbagy (quarter finals)
8. (Egypt) Fares Dessouky (quarter finals)

9. (Wales) Joel Makin (third round)
10. (Egypt) Mazen Hesham (third round)
11. (Egypt) Youssef Ibrahim (third round)
12. (Egypt) Karim Abdel Gawad (third round)
13. (France) Grégoire Marche (third round)
14. (Colombia) Miguel Ángel Rodríguez (first round)
15. (Egypt) Youssef Soliman (third round)
16. (India) Saurav Ghosal (third round)

== Draw and results ==
=== Key ===
- rtd. = Retired
- Q = Qualifier
- WC = Host wild card
- I = WSF invitee
- w/o = Walkover

=== Finals ===
Semi finals
1	(New Zealand) Paul Coll	4	11	12	8	7
3	(Egypt) Mohamed El Shorbagy	11	8	10	11	11
4	(Egypt) Mostafa Asal	11	8	8	11	9
2	(Egypt) Ali Farag	8	11	11	6	11

Final
3	(Egypt) Mohamed El Shorbagy	11	8	11	9	2
2	(Egypt) Ali Farag	9	11	7	11	11

2022 Men's PSA World Squash Championship winner
(Egypt)
Ali Farag
Third title

=== Top half ===
==== Section 1 ====
First round
1	(New Zealand) Paul Coll	11	11	11
WC	(Egypt) Seif Shenawy	5	3	8
(Egypt) Mazen Gamal	9	2	5
(India) Mahesh Mangaonkar	11	11	11
(Egypt) Karim El Hammamy	11	11	9	11
Q	(Egypt) Ibrahim Elkabbani	9	9	11	4
(Canada) David Baillargeon	9	7	7
10	(Egypt) Mazen Hesham	11	11	11
9	(Wales) Joel Makin	11	11	11
Q	(Argentina) Leandro Romiglio	8	4	2
(France) Lucas Serme	11	11	11
(Hong Kong) Alex Lau	6	6	5
(United States) Faraz Khan	5	11	11	11
(Egypt) Mohamed ElSherbini	11	8	9	5
(Malaysia) Eain Yow	13	6	9
6	(Egypt) Tarek Momen	15	11	11

Second round
1	(New Zealand) Paul Coll	11	11	11
(India) Mahesh Mangaonkar	5	3	9
(Egypt) Karim El Hammamy	8	5	6
10	(Egypt) Mazen Hesham	11	11	11
9	(Wales) Joel Makin	11	11	11
(France) Lucas Serme	8	3	6
(United States) Faraz Khan	7	11	7	8
6	(Egypt) Tarek Momen	11	8	11	11

Third Round
1	(New Zealand) Paul Coll	11	11	11
10	(Egypt) Mazen Hesham	5	0	6
9	(Wales) Joel Makin	11	9	2	7
6	(Egypt) Tarek Momen	8	11	11	11

Quarter finals
1	(New Zealand) Paul Coll	11	13	10	2	11
6	(Egypt) Tarek Momen	8	11	12	11	9

==== Section 2 ====
First round
8	(Egypt) Fares Dessouky	11	11	11
I	(Portugal) Rui Soares	4	2	2
(England) George Parker	11	11	11
(Spain) Edmon López	6	3	4
(United States) Christopher Gordon	4	4	6
(India) Ramit Tandon	11	11	11
(France) Auguste Dussourd	4	7	11	11	3
13	(France) Grégoire Marche	11	11	6	9	11
12	(Egypt) Karim Abdel Gawad	11	11	7	11
(Switzerland) Dimitri Steinmann	9	6	11	9
(France) Baptiste Masotti	6	11	5	5
(France) Victor Crouin	11	9	11	11
(United States) Shahjahan Khan	6	10	7^{rtd.}
Q	(Colombia) Juan Camilo Vargas	11	12	9
Q	(Hungary) Balázs Farkas	8	2	6
3	(Egypt) Mohamed El Shorbagy	11	11	11

Second round
8	(Egypt) Fares Dessouky	11	9	11	11
(England) George Parker	6	11	3	4
(India) Ramit Tandon	13	11	7	8
13	(France) Grégoire Marche	15	9	11	11
12	(Egypt) Karim Abdel Gawad	11	11	11
(France) Victor Crouin	9	5	8
Q	(Colombia) Juan Camilo Vargas	6	4	5
3	(Egypt) Mohamed El Shorbagy	11	11	11

Third Round
8	(Egypt) Fares Dessouky	11	14	11	11
13	(France) Grégoire Marche	6	16	8	7
12	(Egypt) Karim Abdel Gawad	3	4	0^{rtd.}
3	(Egypt) Mohamed El Shorbagy	11	11	6

Quarter finals
8	(Egypt) Fares Dessouky	1	10	10
3	(Egypt) Mohamed El Shorbagy	11	12	12

=== Bottom half ===
==== Section 3 ====
First round
4	(Egypt) Mostafa Asal	11	11	11
(England) Adrian Waller	7	5	6
(Egypt) Omar Mosaad	9	12	11	11
(Egypt) Moustafa El Sirty	11	10	3	5
(Scotland) Alan Clyne	7	4	3
(United States) Todd Harrity	11	11	11
(Egypt) Zahed Salem	4	9	11	7
16	(India) Saurav Ghosal	11	11	6	11
15	(Egypt) Youssef Soliman	11	11	11
(Spain) Borja Golán	9	6	8
(Pakistan) Asim Khan	4	11	6	3
WC	(Egypt) Yassin ElShafei	11	8	11	11
(France) Sébastien Bonmalais	11	11	11
(Spain) Bernat Jaume	7	4	4
(England) Patrick Rooney	4	11	11	8	2
5	(Peru) Diego Elías	11	7	9	11	11

Second round
4	(Egypt) Mostafa Asal	11	11	11
(Egypt) Omar Mosaad	5	3	4
(United States) Todd Harrity	8	8	7
16	(India) Saurav Ghosal	11	11	11
15	(Egypt) Youssef Soliman	11	11	11
WC	(Egypt) Yassin ElShafei	7	5	3
(France) Sébastien Bonmalais	9	3	7
5	(Peru) Diego Elías	11	11	11

Third Round
4	(Egypt) Mostafa Asal	11	11	11
16	(India) Saurav Ghosal	2	7	3
15	(Egypt) Youssef Soliman	4	2	3
5	(Peru) Diego Elías	11	11	11

Quarter finals
4	(Egypt) Mostafa Asal	9	11	11	11
5	(Peru) Diego Elías	11	4	7	7

==== Section 4 ====
First round
7	(Egypt) Marwan El Shorbagy	2
(Spain) Iker Pajares	0^{rtd.}
(Hong Kong) Henry Leung	8	11	11	11
(Malaysia) Ivan Yuen	11	6	5	5
I	(Japan) Ryosei Kobayashi	7	6	5
(Switzerland) Nicolas Müller	11	11	11
(Germany) Raphael Kandra	11	5	11	4	11
14	(Colombia) Miguel Ángel Rodríguez	6	11	9	11	6
11	(Egypt) Youssef Ibrahim	11	11	11
(England) Nathan Lake	5	7	4
(Scotland) Greg Lobban	11	9	6	11	8
(Qatar) Abdulla Al-Tamimi	7	11	11	8	11
(Mexico) César Salazar	5	9	11	11	11
(Egypt) Yahya Elnawasany	11	11	4	9	4
(Mexico) Leonel Cárdenas	8	5	8
2	(Egypt) Ali Farag	11	11	11

Second round
7	(Egypt) Marwan El Shorbagy	8	11	11	14
(Hong Kong) Henry Leung	11	4	9	12
(Switzerland) Nicolas Müller	11	11	11
(Germany) Raphael Kandra	4	4	6
11	(Egypt) Youssef Ibrahim	10	7	11	11	11
(Qatar) Abdulla Al-Tamimi	12	11	9	2	7
(Mexico) César Salazar	11	1	9
2	(Egypt) Ali Farag	13	11	11

Third Round
7	(Egypt) Marwan El Shorbagy	11	11	16
(Switzerland) Nicolas Müller	8	8	14
11	(Egypt) Youssef Ibrahim	3	1	2
2	(Egypt) Ali Farag	11	11	11

Quarter finals
7	(Egypt) Marwan El Shorbagy	7	5	7
2	(Egypt) Ali Farag	11	11	11

== Schedule ==
Times are Egypt Standard Time (UTC+02:00). To the best of five games.

=== Round 1 ===
Friday, 13 May

Date	Court	Time	Player 1	Player 2	Score
13 May	Court 1	12:45	Fares Dessouky (EGY)	Rui Soares (POR)	11–4, 11–2, 11–2
13 May	Court 2	12:45	Auguste Dussourd (FRA)	Grégoire Marche (FRA)	11–4, 11–7, 6–11, 9–11, 11–3
13 May	Court 3	12:45	Karim Abdel Gawad (EGY)	Dimitri Steinmann (USA)	11–9, 11–6, 7–11, 11–9
13 May	Court 1	14:15	George Parker (ENG)	Edmon López (ESP)	11–6, 11–3, 11–4
13 May	Court 2	14:15	Christopher Gordon (USA)	Ramit Tandon (IND)	11–4, 11–4, 11–6
13 May	Court 3	14:15	Baptiste Masotti (FRA)	Victor Crouin (FRA)	11–6, 9–11, 11–5, 11–5
13 May	Court 1	16:00	Eain Yow (MYS)	Tarek Momen (EGY)	15–13, 11–6, 11–9
13 May	Court 2	16:45	Joel Makin (WAL)	Leandro Romiglio (ARG)	11–8, 11–4, 11–2
13 May	Court 3	16:45	David Baillargeon (CAN)	Mazen Hesham (EGY)	11–9, 11–7, 11–7
13 May	Court 1	17:30	Faraz Khan (USA)	Mohamed ElSherbini (EGY)	5–11, 11–8, 11–9, 11–5
13 May	Court 2	18:15	Lucas Serme (FRA)	Alex Lau (HKG)	11–6, 11–6, 11–5
13 May	Court 3	18:15	Karim El Hammamy (EGY)	Ibrahim Elkabbani (EGY)	11–9, 11–9, 9–11, 11–4
13 May	Court 1	19:00	Mazen Gamal (EGY)	Mahesh Mangaonkar (IND)	11–9, 11–2, 11–5
13 May	Court 2	19:00	Shahjahan Khan (USA)	Juan Camilo Vargas (COL)	11–6, 12–10, 9–7^{rtd.}
13 May	Glass Court	19:30	Paul Coll (NZL)	Seif Shenawy (EGY)	11–5, 11–3, 11–8
13 May	Glass Court	21:00	Balázs Farkas (HUN)	Mohamed El Shorbagy (EGY)	11–8, 11–2, 11–6

——————————————————————————————————————————————————————————————————————————————————————————————————————————

Saturday, 14 May

Date	Court	Time	Player 1	Player 2	Score
14 May	Court 1	12:45	Patrick Rooney (ENG)	Diego Elías (PER)	11–4, 7–11, 9–11, 11–8, 11–2
14 May	Court 2	12:45	Youssef Soliman (EGY)	Borja Golán (ESP)	11–9, 11–6, 11–8
14 May	Court 3	12:45	Zahed Salem (EGY)	Saurav Ghosal (IND)	11–4, 11–9, 6–11, 11–7
14 May	Court 1	14:15	Sébastien Bonmalais (FRA)	Bernat Jaume (ESP)	11–7, 11–4, 11–4
14 May	Court 2	14:15	Asim Khan (PAK)	Yassin ElShafei (EGY)	11–4, 8–11, 11–6, 11–3
14 May	Court 3	14:15	Alan Clyne (SCO)	Todd Harrity (USA)	11–7, 11–4, 11–3
14 May	Court 1	16:00	Marwan El Shorbagy (EGY)	Iker Pajares (ESP)	2–0^{rtd.}
14 May	Court 2	16:45	Raphael Kandra (GER)	Miguel Ángel Rodríguez (COL)	11–6, 5–11, 11–9, 4–11, 11–6
14 May	Court 3	16:45	Youssef Ibrahim (EGY)	Nathan Lake (ENG)	11–5, 11–7, 11–4
14 May	Court 1	17:30	Henry Leung (HKG)	Ivan Yuen (MYS)	8–11, 11–6, 11–5, 11–5
14 May	Court 2	18:15	Ryosei Kobayashi (JPN)	Nicolas Müller (SUI)	11–7, 11–6, 11–5
14 May	Court 3	18:15	Greg Lobban (SCO)	Abdulla Al-Tamimi (QAT)	7–11, 11–9, 11–6, 8–11, 11–8
14 May	Court 1	19:00	César Salazar (MEX)	Yahya Elnawasany (EGY)	5–11, 9–11, 11–4, 11–9, 11–4
14 May	Court 2	19:00	Omar Mosaad (EGY)	Moustafa El Sirty (EGY)	9–11, 12–10, 11–3, 11–5
14 May	Glass Court	19:30	Leonel Cárdenas (MEX)	Ali Farag (EGY)	11–8, 11–5, 11–8
14 May	Glass Court	21:00	Mostafa Asal (EGY)	Adrian Waller (ENG)	11–7, 11–5, 11–6

=== Round 2 ===
Sunday, 15 & Monday 16 May

Date	Court	Time	Player 1	Player 2	Score
15 May	Court 1	14:45	Fares Dessouky (EGY)	George Parker (ENG)	11–6, 9–11, 11–3, 11–4
15 May	Court 2	14:45	Ramit Tandon (IND)	Grégoire Marche (FRA)	15–13, 9–11, 11–7, 11–8
15 May	Court 3	14:45	Karim Abdel Gawad (EGY)	Victor Crouin (FRA)	11–9, 11–5, 11–8
15 May	Court 1	16:45	Karim El Hammamy (EGY)	Mazen Hesham (EGY)	11–8, 11–5, 11–6
15 May	Court 2	16:45	Joel Makin (WAL)	Lucas Serme (FRA)	11–8, 11–3, 11–6
15 May	Court 3	16:45	Faraz Khan (USA)	Tarek Momen (EGY)	11–7, 8–11, 11–7, 11–8
15 May	Glass Court	19:30	Paul Coll (NZL)	Mahesh Mangaonkar (IND)	11–5, 11–3, 11–9
15 May	Glass Court	21:00	Juan Camilo Vargas (COL)	Mohamed El Shorbagy (EGY)	11–6, 11–4, 11–5
16 May	Court 1	14:45	Sébastien Bonmalais (FRA)	Diego Elías (PER)	11–9, 11–3, 11–7
16 May	Court 2	14:45	Youssef Soliman (EGY)	Yassin ElShafei (EGY)	11–7, 11–5, 11–3
16 May	Court 3	14:45	Todd Harrity (USA)	Saurav Ghosal (IND)	11–8, 11–8, 11–7
16 May	Court 1	16:45	Marwan El Shorbagy (EGY)	Henry Leung (HKG)	8–11, 11–4, 11–9, 14–12
16 May	Court 2	16:45	Nicolas Müller (SUI)	Raphael Kandra (GER)	11–4, 11–4, 11–6
16 May	Court 3	16:45	Youssef Ibrahim (EGY)	Abdulla Al-Tamimi (QAT)	10–12, 7–11, 11–9, 11–2, 11–7
16 May	Glass Court	19:30	César Salazar (MEX)	Ali Farag (EGY)	13–11, 11–1, 11–9
16 May	Glass Court	21:00	Mostafa Asal (EGY)	Omar Mosaad (EGY)	11–5, 11–3, 11–4

=== Round 3 ===
Tuesday, 17 & Wednesday 18 May

Date	Court	Time	Player 1	Player 2	Score
17 May	Court Museum	19:30	Paul Coll (NZL)	Mazen Hesham (EGY)	11–5, 11–0, 11–6
17 May	Glass Court	19:30	Fares Dessouky (EGY)	Grégoire Marche (FRA)	11–6, 14–16, 11–8, 11–7
17 May	Court Museum	21:00	Karim Abdel Gawad (EGY)	Mohamed El Shorbagy (EGY)	11–3, 11–4, 6–0^{rtd.}
17 May	Glass Court	21:00	Joel Makin (WAL)	Tarek Momen (EGY)	8–11, 11–9, 11–2, 11–7
18 May	Court Museum	19:30	Youssef Ibrahim (EGY)	Ali Farag (EGY)	11–3, 11–1, 11–2
18 May	Glass Court	19:30	Youssef Soliman (EGY)	Diego Elías (PER)	11–4, 11–2, 11–3
18 May	Court Museum	21:00	Mostafa Asal (EGY)	Saurav Ghosal (IND)	11–2, 11–7, 11–3
18 May	Glass Court	21:00	Marwan El Shorbagy (EGY)	Nicolas Müller (SUI)	11–8, 11–8, 16–14

=== Quarter-finals ===
Thursday, 19 & Friday 20 May

Date	Court	Time	Player 1	Player 2	Score
19 May	Court Museum	19:30	Paul Coll (NZL)	Tarek Momen (EGY)	11–8, 13–11, 10–12, 2–11, 11–9
19 May	Court Museum	21:00	Fares Dessouky (EGY)	Mohamed El Shorbagy (EGY)	11–1, 12–10, 12–10
20 May	Court Museum	19:30	Marwan El Shorbagy (EGY)	Ali Farag (EGY)	11–7, 11–5, 11–7
20 May	Court Museum	21:00	Mostafa Asal (EGY)	Diego Elías (PER)	9–11, 11–4, 11–7, 11–7

=== Semi-finals ===
Saturday, 21 May

Date	Court	Time	Player 1	Player 2	Score
21 May	Court Museum	Following women's semi-final 1	Mohamed El Shorbagy (EGY)	Paul Coll (NZL)	11–4, 8–11, 10–12, 11–8, 11–7
21 May	Court Museum	Following women's semi-final 2	Ali Farag (EGY)	Mostafa Asal (EGY)	8–11, 11–8, 11–8, 6–11, 11–9

=== Final ===
Sunday, 22 May

Date	Court	Time	Player 1	Player 2	Score
22 May	Court Museum	Following women's final	Ali Farag (EGY)	Mohamed El Shorbagy (EGY)	9–11, 11–8, 7–11, 11–9, 11–2

== Representation ==
This table shows the number of players by country in the 2022 PSA Men's World Championship. A total of 19 nationalities are represented. Egypt is the most represented nation with 20 players.

	(Egypt) EGY	(New Zealand) NZL	(Peru) PER	(France) FRA	(India) IND	(Switzerland) SUI	(Wales) WAL	(United States) USA	(England) ENG	(Colombia) COL	(Hong Kong) HKG	(Mexico) MEX	(Germany) GER	(Qatar) QAT	(Spain) ESP	(Malaysia) MAS	(Scotland) SCO	(Argentina) ARG	(Canada) CAN	(Hungary) HUN	(Japan) JPN	(Pakistan) PAK	(Portugal) POR	Total
Final	2	0	0	0	0	0	0	0	0	0	0	0	0	0	0	0	0	0	0	0	0	0	0	2
Semi-final	3	1	0	0	0	0	0	0	0	0	0	0	0	0	0	0	0	0	0	0	0	0	0	4
Quarter-final	6	1	1	0	0	0	0	0	0	0	0	0	0	0	0	0	0	0	0	0	0	0	0	8
Round 3	10	1	1	1	1	1	1	0	0	0	0	0	0	0	0	0	0	0	0	0	0	0	0	16
Round 2	13	1	1	4	2	1	1	2	1	1	1	1	1	1	0	0	0	0	0	0	0	0	0	32
Total	20	1	1	6	3	2	1	4	4	2	2	2	1	1	4	2	2	1	1	1	1	1	1	64

== See also ==
- World Squash Championships
- 2022 PSA Women's World Squash Championship

Preceded by Chicago (USA); 2020–21	PSA World Championships; Cairo (Egypt); 2022	Succeeded by TBA; 2023
