= 2020–21 PSA Men's World Squash Championship =

2020–21 Men's World Championship
- 42nd PSA Men's World Squash Championship
- Location: Chicago, United States
- Venue: University Club of Chicago
- Date: 14–22 July 2021
- Website https://worldsquashchamps.com/
- Category: PSA World Championships
- Prize money: $500,000

Results
- Champion: (Egypt) Ali Farag
- Runner-up: (Egypt) Mohamed El Shorbagy
- Semi-finalists: (Egypt) Tarek Momen (New Zealand) Paul Coll

The 2020–21 PSA Men's World Squash Championship was the 2020–21 men's edition of the World Squash Championships, which served as the individual world championship for squash players. The event took place in Chicago, United States from 14 to 22 July 2021. It was the second time that Chicago hosted the PSA World Championships after 2018–19 edition.

== World Ranking Points/Prize money ==
PSA also awards points towards World Ranking. Points are awarded as follows:

PSA World Squash Championships		Ranking Points						
Rank	Prize money US$	Winner	Runner up	3/4	5/8	9/16	17/32	33/64
World Squash Championships	$500,000	3175	2090	1270	780	475	290	177.5

=== Prize money breakdown ===
Total prize money for the tournament is $1,000,000, $500,000 per gender. This is a 7,65% prize fund increase from previous World Championships (2019–20, $335,000 Men's/$430,000 Women's) that were held separately.

Position (num. of players)		% breakdown	Prize money (Total: $500,000)
Winner	(1)	16%	$80,000
Runner-up	(1)	10%	$50,000
3/4	(2)	6%	$30,000
5/8	(4)	3.50%	$17,500
9/16	(8)	2%	$10,000
17/32	(16)	1%	$5,000
33/64	(32)	0.50%	$2,500

== Seeds ==
Click on the seed number of a player to go to their draw section.

1. (Egypt) Ali Farag (champion)
2. (Egypt) Mohamed El Shorbagy (runner-up)
3. (Egypt) Tarek Momen (semifinals)
4. (New Zealand) Paul Coll (semifinals)
5. (Egypt) Marwan El Shorbagy (quarterfinals)
6. (Egypt) Karim Abdel Gawad (quarterfinals)
7. (Egypt) Fares Dessouky (quarterfinals)
8. (Peru) Diego Elías (quarterfinals)

9. (Wales) Joel Makin (third round)
10. (Colombia) Miguel Ángel Rodríguez (third round)
11. (Egypt) Mohamed Abouelghar (third round)
12. (India) Saurav Ghosal (third round)
13. (France) Grégoire Marche (third round)
14. (Egypt) Mazen Hesham (second round)
15. (Egypt) Omar Mosaad (second round)
16. (England) James Willstrop (first round)

== Draw and results ==
=== Key ===
- r = Retired

=== Finals ===
Semi finals
1	(Egypt) Ali Farag	10	11	12	5	11
3	(Egypt) Tarek Momen	12	5	10	11	8
4	(New Zealand) Paul Coll	5	3	11	8
2	(Egypt) Mohamed El Shorbagy	11	11	4	11

Final
1	(Egypt) Ali Farag	7	12	11	11
2	(Egypt) Mohamed El Shorbagy	11	10	9	4

2020–21 Men's PSA World Squash Championship winner
(Egypt)
Ali Farag
Second title

=== Top half ===
==== Section 1 ====
First round
1	(Egypt) Ali Farag	11	11	11
WC	(United States) Faraz Khan	3	2	7
(Malaysia) Eain Yow	11	8	11	11
(England) Adrian Waller	6	11	9	5
(Switzerland) Dimitri Steinmann	11	7	11	11
(United States) Todd Harrity	8	11	7	6
(India) Aditya Jagtap	2	11	4	3
10	(Colombia) Miguel Ángel Rodríguez	11	3	11	11
15	(Egypt) Omar Mosaad	11	11	11
(Qatar) Syed Azlan Amjad	2	4	3
(India) Ramit Tandon	11	9	6
(England) George Parker	13	11	11
(France) Mathieu Castagnet	11	11	11
(Mexico) Leonel Cárdenas	7	3	7
(Malaysia) Ivan Yuen	9	4	4
8	(Peru) Diego Elías	11	11	11

Second round
1	(Egypt) Ali Farag	11	11	11
(Malaysia) Eain Yow	6	9	5
(Switzerland) Dimitri Steinmann	9	7	4
10	(Colombia) Miguel Ángel Rodríguez	11	11	11
15	(Egypt) Omar Mosaad	11	11	4	6
(England) George Parker	13	3	11	11
(France) Mathieu Castagnet	4	6	4
8	(Peru) Diego Elías	11	11	11

Third Round
1	(Egypt) Ali Farag	11	11	11
10	(Colombia) Miguel Ángel Rodríguez	3	5	5
(England) George Parker	6	11	4
8	(Peru) Diego Elías	11	13	11

Quarter finals
1	(Egypt) Ali Farag	7	11	11	11
8	(Peru) Diego Elías	11	7	9	4

==== Section 2 ====
First round
5	(Egypt) Marwan El Shorbagy	11	14	11
(Hong Kong) Henry Leung	7	10	7
(Egypt) Mohamed ElSherbini	11	11	11
(United States) Christopher Gordon	3	6	9
(Hong Kong) Alex Lau	2	4	11	5
(Switzerland) Nicolas Müller	11	11	7	11
(India) Vikram Malhotra	4	5	4
13	(France) Grégoire Marche	11	11	11
16	(England) James Willstrop	11	11	9	10
(Egypt) Youssef Ibrahim	13	8	11	12
(Scotland) Alan Clyne	11	11	6	4	7
(United States) Shahjahan Khan	4	6	11	11	11
(England) Declan James	11	8	5	9
(Egypt) Youssef Soliman	5	11	11	11
(Pakistan) Asim Khan	11	5	2	5
3	(Egypt) Tarek Momen	6	11	11	11

Second round
5	(Egypt) Marwan El Shorbagy	9	11	11	9	11
(Egypt) Mohamed ElSherbini	11	6	4	11	4
(Switzerland) Nicolas Müller	6	7	11	7
13	(France) Grégoire Marche	11	11	8	11
(Egypt) Youssef Ibrahim	11	11	13
(United States) Shahjahan Khan	8	5	11
(Egypt) Youssef Soliman	7	11	7	5
3	(Egypt) Tarek Momen	11	4	11	11

Third Round
5	(Egypt) Marwan El Shorbagy	8	11	11	11
13	(France) Grégoire Marche	11	4	3	9
(Egypt) Youssef Ibrahim	2	9	8
3	(Egypt) Tarek Momen	11	11	11

Quarter finals
5	(Egypt) Marwan El Shorbagy	11	8	5	11
3	(Egypt) Tarek Momen	4	11	11	13

=== Bottom half ===
==== Section 3 ====
First round
4	(New Zealand) Paul Coll	11	11	11
(Pakistan) Tayyab Aslam	2	5	2
(England) Nathan Lake	9	13	10
(France) Victor Crouin	11	15	12
(Germany) Raphael Kandra	11	11	11
(Mexico) Alfredo Ávila	8	8	4
WC	(Egypt) Aly Hussein	1	5	5
12	(India) Saurav Ghosal	11	11	11
14	(Egypt) Mazen Hesham	11	11	11
(Hong Kong) Max Lee	4	2	6
(France) Baptiste Masotti	11	9	11	12
(Spain) Bernat Jaume	5	11	6	10
(Malaysia) Mohd Syafiq Kamal	4	5	3
(Spain) Borja Golán	11	11	11
(France) Sébastien Bonmalais	11	7	15
6	(Egypt) Karim Abdel Gawad	13	11	17

Second round
4	(New Zealand) Paul Coll	11	11	11
(France) Victor Crouin	7	8	8
(Germany) Raphael Kandra	8	3	5
12	(India) Saurav Ghosal	11	11	11
14	(Egypt) Mazen Hesham	11	11	4	1	6
(France) Baptiste Masotti	9	9	11	11	11
(Spain) Borja Golán	9	9	9
6	(Egypt) Karim Abdel Gawad	11	11	11

Third Round
4	(New Zealand) Paul Coll	11	7	11	11
12	(India) Saurav Ghosal	3	11	5	5
(France) Baptiste Masotti	11	0	7	4
6	(Egypt) Karim Abdel Gawad	8	11	11	11

Quarter finals
4	(New Zealand) Paul Coll	7	8	11	11	11
6	(Egypt) Karim Abdel Gawad	11	11	9	4	6

==== Section 4 ====
First round
7	(Egypt) Fares Dessouky	6	11	11	11
(Scotland) Greg Lobban	11	5	6	3
(India) Mahesh Mangaonkar	12	7	11	9	3
(Japan) Ryosei Kobayashi	10	11	8	11	11
(France) Lucas Serme	11	12	9	5
(Mexico) Arturo Salazar	7	14	11	11
(Egypt) Karim El Hammamy	7	5	8
11	(Egypt) Mohamed Abouelghar	11	11	11
9	(Wales) Joel Makin	11	12	11
(Qatar) Abdulla Al-Tamimi	3	10	6
(Spain) Iker Pajares	9	6	7^{r}
(France) Grégory Gaultier	11	11	7
(United States) Chris Hanson	1	3	8
(England) Patrick Rooney	11	11	11
(Hong Kong) Yip Tsz Fung	6	5	5
2	(Egypt) Mohamed El Shorbagy	11	11	11

Second round
7	(Egypt) Fares Dessouky	11	11	11
(Japan) Ryosei Kobayashi	6	8	7
(Mexico) Arturo Salazar	7	5	4
11	(Egypt) Mohamed Abouelghar	11	11	11
9	(Wales) Joel Makin	11	11	11
(France) Grégory Gaultier	4	8	0
(England) Patrick Rooney	7	6	7
2	(Egypt) Mohamed El Shorbagy	11	11	11

Third Round
7	(Egypt) Fares Dessouky	11	11	11	12
11	(Egypt) Mohamed Abouelghar	6	13	7	10
9	(Wales) Joel Makin	4	7	7
2	(Egypt) Mohamed El Shorbagy	11	11	11

Quarter finals
7	(Egypt) Fares Dessouky	6	7	5
2	(Egypt) Mohamed El Shorbagy	11	11	11

== Schedule ==
Times are Central Daylight Time (UTC−05:00). To the best of five games.

=== Round 1 ===
Wednesday, 14 July

Date	Court	Time	Player 1	Player 2	Score
14 July	Glass Court	12:15	Alan Clyne (SCO)	Shahjahan Khan (USA)	11–4, 11–6, 6–11, 4–11, 7–11
14 July	Court 1	12:15	Omar Mosaad (EGY)	Syed Azlan Amjad (QAT)	11–2, 11–4, 11–3
14 July	Court 2	12:15	Mohamed ElSherbini (EGY)	Christopher Gordon (USA)	11–3, 11–6, 11–9
14 July	Court 3	12:15	James Willstrop (ENG)	Youssef Ibrahim (EGY)	13–13, 11–8, 9–11, 10–12
14 July	Glass Court	14:15	Asim Khan (PAK)	Tarek Momen (EGY)	11–6, 5–11, 2–11, 5–11
14 July	Court 1	14:15	Ramit Tandon (IND)	George Parker (ENG)	11–13, 9–11, 6–11
14 July	Court 2	14:15	Marwan El Shorbagy (EGY)	Henry Leung (HKG)	11–7, 14–12, 11–7
14 July	Court 3	14:15	Declan James (ENG)	Youssef Soliman (EGY)	11–5, 8–11, 5–11, 9–11
14 July	Court 1	16:15	Mathieu Castagnet (FRA)	Leonel Cárdenas (MEX)	11–7, 11–3, 11–7
14 July	Court 2	14:15	Alex Lau (HKG)	Nicolas Müller (SUI)	2–11, 4–11, 11–7, 5–11
14 July	Court 3	14:15	Aditya Jagtap (IND)	Miguel Ángel Rodríguez (COL)	2–11, 11–3, 4–11, 3–11
14 July	Glass Court	17:45	Dimitri Steinmann (SUI)	Todd Harrity (USA)	11–8, 7–11, 11–7, 11–6
14 July	Court 1	18:15	Ivan Yuen (MYS)	Diego Elías (PER)	9–11, 4–11, 4–11
14 July	Court 2	18:15	Vikram Malhotra (IND)	Grégoire Marche (FRA)	4–11, 5–11, 4–11
14 July	Court 3	18:15	Eain Yow (MYS)	Adrian Waller (ENG)	11–6, 8–11, 11–9, 11–5
14 July	Glass Court	19:45	Ali Farag (EGY)	Faraz Khan (USA)	11–3, 11–2, 11–7

——————————————————————————————————————————————————————————————————————————————————————————————————————————

Thursday, 15 July

Date	Court	Time	Player 1	Player 2	Score
15 July	Glass Court	12:15	Sébastien Bonmalais (FRA)	Karim Abdel Gawad (EGY)	11–13, 7–11, 15–17
15 July	Court 1	12:15	Raphael Kandra (GER)	Alfredo Ávila (MEX)	11–8, 11–8, 11–4
15 July	Court 2	12:15	Lucas Serme (FRA)	Arturo Salazar (MEX)	11–7, 12–14, 9–11, 5–11
15 July	Court 3	12:15	Mohd Syafiq Kamal (MYS)	Borja Golán (ESP)	4–11, 5–11, 3–11
15 July	Glass Court	14:15	Fares Dessouky (EGY)	Greg Lobban (SCO)	6–11, 11–5, 11–6, 11–3
15 July	Court 1	14:15	Aly Hussein (EGY)	Saurav Ghosal (IND)	1–11, 5–11, 5–11
15 July	Court 2	14:15	Karim El Hammamy (EGY)	Mohamed Abouelghar (EGY)	7–11, 5–11, 8–11
15 July	Court 3	14:15	Mahesh Mangaonkar (IND)	Ryosei Kobayashi (JPN)	12–10, 7–11, 11–8, 9–11, 3–11
15 July	Court 1	16:15	Mazen Hesham (EGY)	Max Lee (HKG)	11–4, 11–2, 11–6
15 July	Court 2	16:15	Joel Makin (WAL)	Abdulla Al-Tamimi (QAT)	11–3, 12–10, 11–6
15 July	Court 3	16:15	Nathan Lake (ENG)	Victor Crouin (FRA)	9–11, 13–15, 10–12
15 July	Glass Court	17:45	Paul Coll (NZL)	Tayyab Aslam (PAK)	11–2, 11–5, 11–2
15 July	Court 1	18:15	Baptiste Masotti (FRA)	Bernat Jaume (ESP)	11–5, 9–11, 11–6, 12–10
15 July	Court 2	18:15	Iker Pajares (ESP)	Grégory Gaultier (FRA)	9–11, 6–11, 7–7^{r}
15 July	Court 3	18:15	Chris Hanson (USA)	Patrick Rooney (ENG)	1–11, 3–11, 8–11
15 July	Glass Court	19:45	Yip Tsz Fung (HKG)	Mohamed El Shorbagy (EGY)	6–11, 5–11, 5–11

=== Round 2 ===
Friday, 16 July

Date	Court	Time	Player 1	Player 2	Score
16 July	Glass Court	12:15	Youssef Soliman (EGY)	Tarek Momen (EGY)	7–11, 11–4, 7–11, 5–11
16 July	Court 1	12:15	Omar Mosaad (EGY)	George Parker (ENG)	11–13, 11–3, 4–11, 6–11
16 July	Court 2	12:15	Nicolas Müller (SUI)	Grégoire Marche (FRA)	6–11, 7–11, 11–8, 7–11
16 July	Court 3	12:15	Borja Golán (ESP)	Karim Abdel Gawad (EGY)	9–11, 9–11, 9–11
16 July	Glass Court	14:15	Paul Coll (NZL)	Victor Crouin (FRA)	11–7, 11–8, 11–8
16 July	Court 1	14:15	Mathieu Castagnet (FRA)	Diego Elías (PER)	4–11, 6–11, 4–11
16 July	Court 2	14:15	Marwan El Shorbagy (EGY)	Mohamed ElSherbini (EGY)	9–11, 11–6, 11–4, 9–11, 11–4
16 July	Court 3	14:15	Fares Dessouky (EGY)	Ryosei Kobayashi (JPN)	11–6, 11–8, 11–7
16 July	Court 1	16:15	Raphael Kandra (GER)	Saurav Ghosal (IND)	8–11, 3–11, 5–11
16 July	Court 2	16:15	Arturo Salazar (MEX)	Mohamed Abouelghar (EGY)	7–11, 5–11, 4–11
16 July	Court 3	16:15	Youssef Ibrahim (EGY)	Shahjahan Khan (USA)	11–8, 11–5, 13–11
16 July	Glass Court	17:45	Ali Farag (EGY)	Eain Yow (MYS)	11–6, 11–9, 11–5
16 July	Court 1	18:15	Mazen Hesham (EGY)	Baptiste Masotti (FRA)	11–9, 11–9, 4–11, 1–11, 6–11
16 July	Court 2	18:15	Joel Makin (WAL)	Grégory Gaultier (FRA)	11–4, 11–8, 11–0
16 July	Court 3	18:15	Dimitri Steinmann (SUI)	Miguel Ángel Rodríguez (COL)	9–11, 7–11, 4–11
16 July	Glass Court	19:45	Patrick Rooney (ENG)	Mohamed El Shorbagy (EGY)	7–11, 6–11, 7–11

=== Round 3 ===
Saturday, 17 & Sunday 18 July

Date	Court	Time	Player 1	Player 2	Score
17 July	Glass Court	12:15	George Parker (ENG)	Diego Elías (PER)	6–11, 11–13, 4–11
17 July	Glass Court	14:15	Marwan El Shorbagy (EGY)	Grégoire Marche (FRA)	8–11, 11–4, 11–3, 11–9
17 July	Glass Court	17:45	Youssef Ibrahim (EGY)	Tarek Momen (EGY)	2–11, 9–11, 8–11
17 July	Glass Court	20:00	Ali Farag (EGY)	Miguel Ángel Rodríguez (COL)	11–3, 11–5, 11–5
18 July	Glass Court	12:15	Paul Coll (NZL)	Saurav Ghosal (IND)	11–3, 7–11, 11–5, 11–5
18 July	Glass Court	14:15	Baptiste Masotti (FRA)	Karim Abdel Gawad (EGY)	11–8, 0–11, 7–11, 4–11
18 July	Glass Court	17:45	Fares Dessouky (EGY)	Mohamed Abouelghar (EGY)	11–6, 11–13, 11–7, 12–10
18 July	Glass Court	20:00	Joel Makin (WAL)	Mohamed El Shorbagy (EGY)	4–11, 7–11, 7–11

=== Quarter-finals ===
Monday, 19 & Tuesday 20 July

Date	Court	Time	Player 1	Player 2	Score
19 July	Glass Court	17:45	Marwan El Shorbagy (EGY)	Tarek Momen (EGY)	11–4, 8–11, 5–11, 11–13
19 July	Glass Court	20:00	Ali Farag (EGY)	Diego Elías (PER)	7–11, 11–7, 11–9, 11–4
20 July	Glass Court	17:45	Paul Coll (NZL)	Karim Abdel Gawad (EGY)	7–11, 8–11, 11–9, 11–4, 11–6
20 July	Glass Court	20:00	Fares Dessouky (EGY)	Mohamed El Shorbagy (EGY)	6–11, 7–11, 5–11

=== Semi-finals ===
Wednesday, 21 July

Date	Court	Time	Player 1	Player 2	Score
21 July	Glass Court	Following women's semi-final 1	Ali Farag (EGY)	Tarek Momen (EGY)	10–12, 11–5, 12–10, 5–11, 11–8
21 July	Glass Court	Following women's semi-final 2	Paul Coll (NZL)	Mohamed El Shorbagy (EGY)	5–11, 3–11, 11–4, 8–11

=== Final ===
Thursday, 22 July

Date	Court	Time	Player 1	Player 2	Score
22 July	Glass Court	Following women's final	Ali Farag (EGY)	Mohamed El Shorbagy (EGY)	7–11, 12–10, 11–9, 11–4

== Representation ==
This table shows the number of players by country in the 2020–21 PSA Men's World Championship. A total of 19 nationalities are represented. Egypt is the most numerous nation with 14 players.

	(Egypt) EGY	(France) FRA	(England) ENG	(India) IND	(United States) USA	(Hong Kong) HKG	(Malaysia) MAS	(Mexico) MEX	(Spain) ESP	(Pakistan) PAK	(Qatar) QAT	(Scotland) SCO	(Switzerland) SUI	(Colombia) COL	(Germany) GER	(Japan) JPN	(New Zealand) NZL	(Peru) PER	(Wales) WAL	Total
Final	2	0	0	0	0	0	0	0	0	0	0	0	0	0	0	0	0	0	0	2
Semi-final	3	0	0	0	0	0	0	0	0	0	0	0	0	0	0	0	1	0	0	4
Quarter-final	6	0	0	0	0	0	0	0	0	0	0	0	0	0	0	0	1	1	0	8
Round 3	8	2	1	1	0	0	0	0	0	0	0	0	0	1	0	0	1	1	1	16
Round 2	12	5	2	1	1	0	1	1	1	0	0	0	2	1	1	1	1	1	1	32
Total	14	7	6	5	5	4	3	3	3	2	2	2	2	1	1	1	1	1	1	64

== See also ==
- World Squash Championships
- 2020–21 PSA Women's World Squash Championship

Preceded by Doha (Qatar); 2019–20	PSA World Championships; Chicago (USA); 2020–21	Succeeded by Cairo (Egypt); 2022
