= Squash at the 2026 Asian Games – Men's team =

Men's team at the 2026 Asian Games
- Venue: Kinjo-Futo Arena
- Dates: 28 September – 2 October 2026
- Competitors: 47 from 12 nations

Medalists
gold medal	Malaysia; Ameeshenraj Chandaran, Sanjay Jeeva, Mohd Syafiq Kamal, Ng Eain Yow
silver medal	Pakistan; Nasir Iqbal, Muhammad Ashab Irfan, Asim Khan, Noor Zaman
bronze medal	India; Suraj Chand, Veer Chotrani, Velavan Senthilkumar, Abhay Singh
bronze medal	Hong Kong; Matthew Lai, Lau Tsz Kwan, Henry Leung, Tang Ming Hong

The men's team squash event is part of the squash programme and took place between 28 September and 2 October, at Nagoya Kinjo-Futo Arena.

== Schedule ==
All times are Japan Standard Time (UTC+09:00)

Date	Time	Event
Monday, 28 September 2026	12:00	Group round
Tuesday, 29 September 2026	14:00	Group round
Wednesday, 30 September 2026	12:00	Quarterfinals
Thursday, 1 October 2026	12:30	Semifinals
Friday, 2 October 2026	15:30	Gold medal match

== Results ==
=== Group round ===
==== Pool A ====
Pos	Team	Pld	W	L	MF	MA	Qualification
1	India	2	2	0	6	0	Quarterfinals
2	South Korea	2	1	1	3	3	Quarterfinals
3	China	2	0	2	0	6	

Source: Tournamentsoftware

28 September	India	3–0	China

Suraj Chand	3–0	Du Shaoqian	11–4, 11–2, 12–10
Veer Chotrani	3–0	Li Haizhen	11–5, 11–5, 11–3
Velavan Senthilkumar	3–0	Zhou Penglin	11–3, 11–2, 11–4

28 September	India	3–0	South Korea

Velavan Senthilkumar	3–0	Na Joo-young	11–6, 11–4, 11–7
Abhay Singh	3–0	Ryu Jeong-min	11–4, 11–7, 11–1
Veer Chotrani	3–0	Oh Seo-jin	11–6, 11–4, 11–2

29 September	South Korea	3–0	China

Oh Seo-jin	3–0	Zhou Penglin	11–2, 11–6, 11–4
Ryu Jeong-min	3–1	Li Haizhen	11–7, 10–12, 15–13, 11–4
Na Joo-young	3–0	Du Shaoqian	11–7, 11–5, 11–4

==== Pool B ====
Pos	Team	Pld	W	L	MF	MA	Qualification
1	Pakistan	2	2	0	6	0	Quarterfinals
2	Kuwait	2	1	1	3	3	Quarterfinals
3	Philippines	2	0	2	0	6	

Source: Tournamentsoftware

28 September	Pakistan	3–0	Philippines

Nasir Iqbal	3–0	Van-Aero Dalida	11–7, 11–1, 11–4
Noor Zaman	3–0	David Pelino	11–4, 11–5, 11–9
Muhammad Ashab Irfan	3–0	Jonathan Reyes	11–4, 11–9, 11–4

28 September	Pakistan	3–0	Kuwait

Nasir Iqbal	3–0	Jassim Al-Ghareeb	11–4, 11–1, 11–5
Noor Zaman	3–1	Ammar Al-Tamimi	8–11, 11–6, 11–2, 11–4
Muhammad Ashab Irfan	3–0	Bader Al-Maghrebi	13–11, 11–5, 11–9

29 September	Kuwait	3–0	Philippines

Bader Al-Maghrebi	3–0	David Pelino	11–8, 11–5, 11–7
Ammar Al-Tamimi	3–0	Reymark Begornia	11–8, 11–9, 11–3
Jassim Al-Ghareeb	3–0	Jonathan Reyes	11–7, 11–1, 11–9

==== Pool C ====
Pos	Team	Pld	W	L	MF	MA	Qualification
1	Malaysia	2	2	0	6	0	Quarterfinals
2	Qatar	2	1	1	3	3	Quarterfinals
3	Thailand	2	0	2	0	6	

Source: Tournamentsoftware

28 September	Malaysia	3–0	Thailand

Mohd Syafiq Kamal	3–0	Arkaradet Arkarahirunya	11–3, 11–3, 11–5
Sanjay Jeeva	3–0	Ravipun Limphaiboon	11–3, 11–0, 11–4
Ameeshenraj Chandaran	3–0	Thitivuth Yingcharoen	11–3, 11–1, 11–4

28 September	Malaysia	3–0	Qatar

Mohd Syafiq Kamal	3–0	Syed Azlan Amjad	11–5, 11–3, 11–4
Ng Eain Yow	3–0	Salem Al-Malki	11–6, 11–5, 11–5
Ameeshenraj Chandaran	3–0	Ali Al-Darwish	11–7, 11–2, 11–1

29 September	Qatar	3–0	Thailand

Ali Al-Darwish	3–1	Thitivuth Yingcharoen	11–8, 6–11, 12–10, 13–11
Salem Al-Malki	3–0	Ravipun Limphaiboon	11–3, 11–3, 11–3
Syed Azlan Amjad	3–0	Arkaradet Arkarahirunya	11–7, 11–5, 11–5

==== Pool D ====
Pos	Team	Pld	W	L	MF	MA	Qualification
1	Hong Kong	2	2	0	5	1	Quarterfinals
2	Japan	2	1	1	4	2	Quarterfinals
3	Mongolia	2	0	2	0	6	

Source: Tournamentsoftware

28 September	Hong Kong	3–0	Mongolia

Tang Ming Hong	3–0	Danzanjamtsyn Anar	11–2, 11–2, 11–3
Lau Tsz Kwan	3–0	Davaajavyn Güyen	11–4, 11–1, 11–3
Henry Leung	3–0	Otgonchimegiin Yesün	11–3, 11–2, 11–3

28 September	Hong Kong	2–1	Japan

Matthew Lai	2–3	Naoki Hayashi	14–16, 13–11, 11–8, 8–11, 7–11
Lau Tsz Kwan	3–1	Ryunosuke Tsukue	12–10, 6–11, 11–9, 11–4
Henry Leung	3–0	Tomotaka Endo	15–13, 11–6, 11–5

29 September	Japan	3–0	Mongolia

Naoki Hayashi	3–0	Otgonchimegiin Yesün	11–0, 11–0, 11–1
Ryunosuke Tsukue	3–0	Davaajavyn Güyen	11–0, 11–0, 11–0
Renshi Makino	3–0	Danzanjamtsyn Anar	11–1, 11–4, 11–1

=== Knockout round ===
Quarterfinals			Semifinals			Gold medal match
A1	India	2
B2	Kuwait	0	A1	India	1
D2	Japan	0	C1	Malaysia	2
C1	Malaysia	2				C1	Malaysia	2
D1	Hong Kong	2				B1	Pakistan	0
C2	Qatar	0	D1	Hong Kong	1
A2	South Korea	0	B1	Pakistan	2
B1	Pakistan	2

==== Quarterfinals ====
30 September	India	2–0	Kuwait

Veer Chotrani	3–1	Bader Al-Maghrebi	12–10, 8–11, 11–0, 11–5
Abhay Singh	3–0	Ammar Al-Tamimi	11–3, 11–4, 11–8

30 September	Japan	0–2	Malaysia

Tomotaka Endo	1–3	Sanjay Jeeva	4–11, 8–11, 11–7, 3–11
Ryunosuke Tsukue	0–3	Ng Eain Yow	6–11, 9–11, 6–11

30 September	Hong Kong	2–0	Qatar

Henry Leung	3–0	Ali Al-Darwish	11–6, 11–3, 11–4
Lau Tsz Kwan	3–0	Salem Al-Malki	11–8, 11–3, 11–2

30 September	South Korea	0–2	Pakistan

Na Joo-young	0–3	Muhammad Ashab Irfan	5–11, 8–11, 8–11
Oh Seo-jin	1–3	Noor Zaman	4–11, 5–11, 11–8, 2–11

==== Semifinals ====
1 October	India	1–2	Malaysia

Abhay Singh	0–3	Ng Eain Yow	8–11, 8–11, 8–11
Veer Chotrani	3–0	Sanjay Jeeva	11–4, 11–8, 11–5
Velavan Senthilkumar	1–3	Ameeshenraj Chandaran	12–10, 6–11, 8–11, 9–11

1 October	Hong Kong	1–2	Pakistan

Lau Tsz Kwan	3–1	Noor Zaman	10–12, 11–3, 11–6, 11–5
Henry Leung	0–3	Muhammad Ashab Irfan	5–11, 11–13, 7–11
Matthew Lai	1–3	Nasir Iqbal	12–10, 3–11, 9–11, 12–14

==== Gold medal match ====
2 October	Malaysia	2–0	Pakistan

Ameeshenraj Chandaran	3–1	Nasir Iqbal	8–11, 11–3, 11–6, 11–4
Ng Eain Yow	3–2	Noor Zaman	11–8, 6–11, 7–11, 11–4, 11–5

== Non-participating athletes ==
- Shi Yuxi (CHN)
- Lee Min-woo (KOR)
- Khaled Al-Fouzan (KUW)
- Mandakhbayaryn Amartüvshin (MGL)
- Asim Khan (PAK)
- Abdulla Al-Tamimi (QAT)
