= Squash at the 2026 Asian Games – Men's singles =

Men's singles at the 2026 Asian Games
- Venue: Kinjo-Futo Arena
- Dates: 23–27 September 2026
- Competitors: 33 from 19 nations

Medalists
gold medal	Ng Eain Yow	Malaysia
silver medal	Abhay Singh	India
bronze medal	Noor Zaman	Pakistan
bronze medal	Muhammad Ashab Irfan	Pakistan

The men's singles squash event is part of the squash programme and took place between 23 September and 27 September, at Nagoya Kinjo-Futo Arena.

== Schedule ==
All times are Japan Standard Time (UTC+09:00)

Date	Time	Event
Wednesday, 23 September 2026	13:30	Round of 64
Wednesday, 23 September 2026	14:00	Round of 32
Thursday, 24 September 2026	14:45	Round of 16
Friday, 25 September 2026	12:45	Quarterfinals
Saturday, 26 September 2026	14:45	Semifinals
Sunday, 27 September 2026	12:45	Finals

== Results ==
Legend

- r — Retired

=== Finals ===
Quarterfinals
1	Ng Eain Yow (MAS)	11	11	11
6	Lau Tsz Kwan (HKG)	4	9	4
8	Henry Leung (HKG)	7	6	11	4
3	Noor Zaman (PAK)	11	11	3	11
4	Veer Chotrani (IND)	11	8	3	3
5	Muhammad Ashab Irfan (PAK)	6	11	11	11
7	Ryunosuke Tsukue (JPN)	4	3	6
2	Abhay Singh (IND)	11	11	11

Semifinals
1	Ng Eain Yow (MAS)	11	11	11
3	Noor Zaman (PAK)	7	2	4
5	Muhammad Ashab Irfan (PAK)	3	10	6
2	Abhay Singh (IND)	11	12	11

Gold medal match
1	Ng Eain Yow (MAS)	11	11	11
2	Abhay Singh (IND)	9	5	5
3/4 play off
3	Noor Zaman (PAK)	11	11	13
5	Muhammad Ashab Irfan (PAK)	7	7	11

=== Top half ===
==== Section 1 ====
Round of 64					Round of 32					Round of 16
					1	Ng Eain Yow (MAS)	11	11	11
Thitivuth Yingcharoen (THA)	3	11	5	9		Reymark Begornia (PHI)	2	1	2
Reymark Begornia (PHI)	11	8	11	11						1	Ng Eain Yow (MAS)	11	11	11
										14	Ryu Jeong-min (KOR)	3	4	5
						Bader Al-Maghrebi (KUW)	4	10	10
					14	Ryu Jeong-min (KOR)	11	12	12

==== Section 2 ====
Round of 64	Round of 32					Round of 16
	11	Tomotaka Endo (JPN)	11	11	11
		Satria Bagus Laksana (INA)	3	6	4
						11	Tomotaka Endo (JPN)	11	11	3	2	7
						6	Lau Tsz Kwan (HKG)	7	5	11	11	11
		Yakhyokhon Nazirov (UZB)	2	3	1
	6	Lau Tsz Kwan (HKG)	11	11	11

==== Section 3 ====
Round of 64	Round of 32					Round of 16
	8	Henry Leung (HKG)	11	11	11
		Osama Al-Bataineh (JOR)	7	4	6
						8	Henry Leung (HKG)	12	14	9	11
							Na Joo-young (KOR)	10	12	11	9
		Na Joo-young (KOR)	11	11	11
	13	Salem Al-Malki (QAT)	1	3	6

==== Section 4 ====
Round of 64	Round of 32							Round of 16
	15	Ammar Al-Tamimi (KUW)	10	11	11	7	11
		Du Shaoqian (CHN)	12	8	5	11	3
								15	Ammar Al-Tamimi (KUW)	4	9	4
								3	Noor Zaman (PAK)	11	11	11
		Van-Aero Dalida (PHI)	2	4	3
	3	Noor Zaman (PAK)	11	11	11

=== Bottom half ===
==== Section 5 ====
Round of 64	Round of 32					Round of 16
	4	Veer Chotrani (IND)	11	11	11
		Shamil Wakeel (SRI)	8	3	3
						4	Veer Chotrani (IND)	11	8	11	15	11
						9	Sanjay Jeeva (MAS)	9	11	6	17	6
		Muhammadmustafo Abdurakhmonov (UZB)	2	4	9
	9	Sanjay Jeeva (MAS)	11	11	11

==== Section 6 ====
Round of 64	Round of 32					Round of 16
	16	Zhou Penglin (CHN)	4	3	4
		Mohammed Al-Nasfan (KSA)	11	11	11
							Mohammed Al-Nasfan (KSA)	9	3	5
						5	Muhammad Ashab Irfan (PAK)	11	11	11
		Jason Karam (LBN)	2	3	0
	5	Muhammad Ashab Irfan (PAK)	11	11	11

==== Section 7 ====
Round of 64	Round of 32					Round of 16
	7	Ryunosuke Tsukue (JPN)	11	11	11
		Sepehr Etemadpour (IRI)	8	2	9
						7	Ryunosuke Tsukue (JPN)	11	7
						10	Abdulla Al-Tamimi (QAT)	6	3^{r}
		Otgonchimegiin Yesün (MGL)	3	2	2
	10	Abdulla Al-Tamimi (QAT)	11	11	11

==== Section 8 ====
Round of 64	Round of 32					Round of 16
	12	Ravindu Laksiri (SRI)	11	11	11
		Davaajavyn Güyen (MGL)	0	1	1
						12	Ravindu Laksiri (SRI)	3	5	6
						2	Abhay Singh (IND)	11	11	11
		Arkaradet Arkarahirunya (THA)	1	0	2
	2	Abhay Singh (IND)	11	11	11
