= Squash at the 2022 Asian Games – Men's team =

Men's team at the 2022 Asian Games
- Venue: Hangzhou Olympic Expo Squash Court
- Dates: 26–30 September 2023
- Competitors: 46 from 12 nations

Medalists
gold medal	India; Saurav Ghosal, Mahesh Mangaonkar, Harinder Pal Sandhu, Abhay Singh
silver medal	Pakistan; Nasir Iqbal, Asim Khan, Farhan Zaman, Noor Zaman
bronze medal	Hong Kong; Lau Tsz Kwan, Henry Leung, Tang Ming Hong, Wong Chi Him
bronze medal	Malaysia; Addeen Idrakie, Mohd Syafiq Kamal, Ng Eain Yow, Ivan Yuen

The men's team squash event was part of the squash programme and took place between 26 September and 30 September 2023, at Hangzhou Olympic Sports Center.

== Schedule ==
All times are China Standard Time (UTC+08:00)

Date	Time	Event
Tuesday, 26 September 2023	10:00	Preliminary round
Wednesday, 27 September 2023	10:00	Preliminary round
Thursday, 28 September 2023	16:00	Preliminary round
Friday, 29 September 2023	16:00	Semifinals
Saturday, 30 September 2023	15:30	Gold medal match

== Results ==
=== Preliminary round ===
==== Pool A ====
Pos	Team	Pld	W	L	MF	MA	Qualification
1	Pakistan	5	5	0	13	2	Semifinals
2	India	5	4	1	13	2	Semifinals
3	Kuwait	5	3	2	8	7	
4	Singapore	5	2	3	6	9	
5	Qatar	5	1	4	5	10	
6	Nepal	5	0	5	0	15	

Source: OCA

26 September	India	3–0	Singapore

Harinder Pal Sandhu	3–1	Jerome Aw	11–4, 13–11, 8–11, 11–7
Saurav Ghosal	3–0	Samuel Kang	11–9, 11–1, 11–4
Abhay Singh	3–0	Marcus Phua	11–7, 11–7, 11–7

26 September	Kuwait	3–0	Nepal

Ali Al-Ramezi	3–0	Amir Bhlon	11–2, 11–3, 11–5
Abdullah Al-Muzayen	3–0	Amrit Thapa Magar	11–2, 11–2, 11–6
Ammar Al-Tamimi	3–0	Arhant Keshar Simha	11–3, 11–3, 11–5

26 September	Pakistan	2–1	Qatar

Nasir Iqbal	3–0	Salem Al-Malki	11–5, 11–5, 11–6
Asim Khan	1–3	Abdulla Al-Tamimi	4–11, 5–11, 11–9, 6–11
Noor Zaman	3–0	Syed Azlan Amjad	12–10, 11–7, 11–9

26 September	Pakistan	3–0	Nepal

Nasir Iqbal	3–0	Amir Bhlon	11–2, 11–5, 11–2
Asim Khan	3–0	Amrit Thapa Magar	11–3, 11–2, 11–5
Noor Zaman	3–0	Arhant Keshar Simha	11–1, 11–8, 11–5

26 September	Kuwait	2–1	Singapore

Falah Fayez	2–3	Marcus Phua	11–7, 8–11, 8–11, 11–2, 10–12
Abdullah Al-Muzayen	3–0	Samuel Kang	11–5, 11–9, 11–4
Ammar Al-Tamimi	3–0	Aaron Liang	11–5, 13–11, 11–7

26 September	India	3–0	Qatar

Mahesh Mangaonkar	3–0	Ahmed Al-Tamimi	11–7, 11–4, 11–1
Saurav Ghosal	3–1	Abdulla Al-Tamimi	11–1, 5–11, 11–5, 11–3
Abhay Singh	3–1	Syed Azlan Amjad	13–11, 8–11, 11–9, 11–2

27 September	India	3–0	Kuwait

Abhay Singh	3–0	Ali Al-Ramezi	11–7, 11–6, 11–6
Saurav Ghosal	3–2	Abdullah Al-Muzayen	5–11, 13–15, 11–6, 3–1, Retired
Mahesh Mangaonkar	3–0	Falah Fayez	11–7, 11–1, 11–2

27 September	Pakistan	3–0	Singapore

Noor Zaman	3–0	Aaron Liang	11–6, 11–6, 11–9
Asim Khan	3–0	Samuel Kang	11–3, 12–10, 11–9
Nasir Iqbal	3–0	Jerome Aw	11–3, 11–5, 11–5

27 September	Qatar	3–0	Nepal

Syed Azlan Amjad	3–0	Arhant Keshar Simha	11–6, 11–4, 11–4
Abdulla Al-Tamimi	3–0	Amrit Thapa Magar	11–3, 11–6, 11–7
Salem Al-Malki	3–0	Amir Bhlon	11–8, 11–3, 11–5

27 September	Kuwait	3–0	Qatar

Ammar Al-Tamimi	3–1	Syed Azlan Amjad	11–6, 11–9, 3–11, 11–5
Abdullah Al-Muzayen	3–1	Abdulla Al-Tamimi	8–11, 12–10, 11–8, 11–9
Falah Fayez	3–0	Ahmed Al-Tamimi	11–5, 11–4, 11–5

27 September	India	1–2	Pakistan

Abhay Singh	1–3	Noor Zaman	8–11, 12–10, 8–11, 8–11
Saurav Ghosal	3–0	Asim Khan	11–3, 11–5, 11–1
Mahesh Mangaonkar	1–3	Nasir Iqbal	6–11, 11–13, 11–9, 8–11

27 September	Singapore	3–0	Nepal

Aaron Liang	3–0	Arhant Keshar Simha	11–3, 11–3, 14–12
Samuel Kang	3–0	Amrit Thapa Magar	11–2, 11–3, 11–2
Marcus Phua	3–0	Amir Bhlon	11–4, 11–4, 11–4

28 September	Pakistan	3–0	Kuwait

Asim Khan	3–0	Abdullah Al-Muzayen	11–9, 11–7, 11–9
Noor Zaman	3–1	Ammar Al-Tamimi	11–7, 11–6, 6–11, 13–11
Nasir Iqbal	3–2	Falah Fayez	11–6, 11–8, 8–11, 9–11, 11–0

28 September	Qatar	1–2	Singapore

Abdulla Al-Tamimi	3–0	Samuel Kang	11–4, 11–3, 11–7
Syed Azlan Amjad	1–3	Aaron Liang	5–11, 11–7, 3–11, 3–11
Salem Al-Malki	0–3	Marcus Phua	6–11, 3–11, 9–11

28 September	India	3–0	Nepal

Abhay Singh	3–0	Amrit Thapa Magar	11–2, 11–4, 11–1
Mahesh Mangaonkar	3–0	Arhant Keshar Simha	11–2, 11–3, 11–3
Harinder Pal Sandhu	3–0	Amir Bhlon	11–1, 11–2, 11–6

==== Pool B ====
Pos	Team	Pld	W	L	MF	MA	Qualification
1	Malaysia	5	5	0	14	1	Semifinals
2	Hong Kong	5	4	1	13	2	Semifinals
3	South Korea	5	3	2	7	8	
4	Japan	5	2	3	7	8	
5	Philippines	5	1	4	4	11	
6	Thailand	5	0	5	0	15	

Source: OCA

26 September	Hong Kong	3–0	South Korea

Tang Ming Hong	3–1	Na Joo-young	11–8, 11–7, 4–11, 11–3
Lau Tsz Kwan	3–0	Yoo Jae-jin	11–5, 11–3, 11–7
Henry Leung	3–0	Lee Min-woo	11–5, 11–7, 11–8

26 September	Malaysia	3–0	Philippines

Mohd Syafiq Kamal	3–0	Reymark Begornia	11–7, 11–6, 11–6
Ng Eain Yow	3–0	Robert Garcia	11–3, 11–7, 11–4
Addeen Idrakie	3–0	David Pelino	11–5, 11–2, 11–4

26 September	Japan	3–0	Thailand

Naoki Hayashi	3–0	Ravipun Limphaiboon	11–2, 11–5, 11–3
Ryunosuke Tsukue	3–0	Nopchanok Buranakul	11–3, 11–4, 11–5
Tomotaka Endo	3–0	Arkaradet Arkarahirunya	11–3, 11–1, 11–8

26 September	Hong Kong	3–0	Thailand

Wong Chi Him	3–0	Natthapat Theerasilp	11–2, 11–4, 11–4
Lau Tsz Kwan	3–0	Nopchanok Buranakul	11–1, 11–1, 11–1
Henry Leung	3–0	Arkaradet Arkarahirunya	11–2, 11–2, 11–2

26 September	Japan	3–0	Philippines

Naoki Hayashi	1–3	Reymark Begornia	11–5, 5–11, 11–6, 11–7
Ryunosuke Tsukue	3–0	Robert Garcia	11–4, 11–7, 11–5
Tomotaka Endo	3–0	David Pelino	11–7, 11–2, 11–9

26 September	Malaysia	3–0	South Korea

Addeen Idrakie	3–0	Lee Dong-jun	11–8, 11–6, 11–7
Ng Eain Yow	3–0	Yoo Jae-jin	11–7, 11–4, 11–9
Ivan Yuen	3–1	Lee Min-woo	12–14, 11–7, 11–6, 14–12

27 September	Malaysia	3–0	Japan

Ivan Yuen	3–2	Tomotaka Endo	6–11, 11–4, 4–11, 11–6, 11–6
Ng Eain Yow	3–1	Ryunosuke Tsukue	11–7, 6–11, 13–11, 11–6
Addeen Idrakie	3–1	Naoki Hayashi	11–5, 11–6, 11–4

27 September	Hong Kong	3–0	Philippines

Henry Leung	3–0	David Pelino	11–1, 11–6, 11–3
Lau Tsz Kwan	3–1	Robert Garcia	11–4, 9–11, 11–9, 11–6
Tang Ming Hong	3–0	Jonathan Reyes	11–2, 11–3, 11–1

27 September	South Korea	3–0	Thailand

Na Joo-young	3–0	Ravipun Limphaiboon	11–3, 11–4, 11–2
Lee Min-woo	3–0	Nopchanok Buranakul	11–5, 11–4, 11–3
Lee Dong-jun	3–0	Natthapat Theerasilp	11–3, 11–8, 11–5

27 September	Malaysia	3–0	Thailand

Addeen Idrakie	3–0	Ravipun Limphaiboon	11–4, 11–1, 11–1
Ng Eain Yow	3–0	Arkaradet Arkarahirunya	11–4, 11–1, 11–4
Mohd Syafiq Kamal	3–0	Natthapat Theerasilp	11–1, 11–1, 11–2

27 September	South Korea	2–1	Philippines

Na Joo-young	3–1	David Pelino	11–2, 11–5, 12–14, 14–12
Yoo Jae-jin	0–3	Robert Garcia	7–11, 10–12, 1–6, Retired
Lee Dong-jun	3–1	Reymark Begornia	11–13, 11–7, 11–8, 11–9

27 September	Hong Kong	3–0	Japan

Henry Leung	3–0	Tomotaka Endo	11–9, 11–5, 11–8
Lau Tsz Kwan	3–2	Ryunosuke Tsukue	10–12, 11–5, 5–11, 11–3, 12–10
Wong Chi Him	3–0	Naoki Hayashi	11–5, 11–3, 11–7

28 September	Japan	1–2	South Korea

Ryunosuke Tsukue	3–0	Yoo Jae-jin	11–2, 11–7, 11–4
Tomotaka Endo	2–3	Lee Min-woo	14–12, 11–7, 9–11, 7–11, 8–11
Naoki Hayashi	0–3	Na Joo-young	8–11, 7–11, 9–11

28 September	Malaysia	2–1	Hong Kong

Ng Eain Yow	3–0	Henry Leung	11–4, 11–3, 12–10
Ivan Yuen	2–3	Tang Ming Hong	6–11, 11–5, 11–7, 4–11, 3–11
Mohd Syafiq Kamal	3–1	Wong Chi Him	3–11, 12–10, 11–8, 11–9

28 September	Philippines	3–0	Thailand

Robert Garcia	3–0	Nopchanok Buranakul	11–9, 11–1, 11–6
Reymark Begornia	3–0	Arkaradet Arkarahirunya	11–2, 11–4, 11–3
Jonathan Reyes	3–0	Ravipun Limphaiboon	11–5, 11–4, 11–0

=== Knockout round ===
Semifinals			Gold medal match
A1	Pakistan	2
B2	Hong Kong	1	A1	Pakistan	1
B1	Malaysia	0	A2	India	2
A2	India	2

==== Semifinals ====
29 September	Pakistan	2–1	Hong Kong

Noor Zaman	3–1	Henry Leung	12–10, 7–11, 11–6, 11–8
Asim Khan	2–3	Lau Tsz Kwan	11–8, 12–14, 12–10, 4–11, 2–11
Nasir Iqbal	3–0	Tang Ming Hong	11–3, 11–5, 11–5

29 September	Malaysia	0–2	India

Addeen Idrakie	1–3	Abhay Singh	3–11, 10–12, 11–9, 6–11
Ng Eain Yow	1–3	Saurav Ghosal	8–11, 6–11, 12–10, 3–11

==== Gold medal match ====
30 September	Pakistan	1–2	India

Nasir Iqbal	3–0	Mahesh Mangaonkar	11–8, 11–3, 11–2
Asim Khan	0–3	Saurav Ghosal	5–11, 1–11, 3–11
Noor Zaman	2–3	Abhay Singh	7–11, 11–9, 11–8, 9–11, 10–12

== Non-participating athletes ==
- Farhan Zaman (PAK)
