= Squash at the 2026 Asian Games – Mixed doubles =

Mixed doubles at the 2026 Asian Games
- Venue: Kinjo-Futo Arena
- Dates: 23–27 September 2026
- Competitors: 40 from 11 nations

Medalists
gold medal	Tang Ming Hong; Lee Ka Yi	Hong Kong
silver medal	Matthew Lai; Toby Tse	Hong Kong
bronze medal	Velavan Senthilkumar; Joshna Chinappa	India
bronze medal	Ameeshenraj Chandaran; Rachel Arnold	Malaysia

The mixed doubles squash event was part of the squash programme and took place between 23 September and 27 September 2026, at the Nagoya Kinjo-Futo Arena.

== Schedule ==
All times are Japan Standard Time (UTC+09:00)

Date	Time	Event
Wednesday, 23 September 2026	11:00	Round of 32
Thursday, 24 September 2026	11:00	Round of 16
Friday, 25 September 2026	10:00	Quarterfinals
Saturday, 26 September 2026	12:00	Semifinals
Sunday, 27 September 2026	14:30	Gold medal match

== Results ==
=== Finals ===
Semifinals					Gold medal match
5	Tang Ming Hong (HKG); Lee Ka Yi (HKG)	11	2	11
3	Velavan Senthilkumar (IND); Joshna Chinappa (IND)	10	11	10	5	Tang Ming Hong (HKG); Lee Ka Yi (HKG)	11	11
4	Matthew Lai (HKG); Toby Tse (HKG)	11	11		4	Matthew Lai (HKG); Toby Tse (HKG)	8	3
2	Ameeshenraj Chandaran (MAS); Rachel Arnold (MAS)	10	7

=== Top half ===
==== Section 1 ====
Round of 32	Round of 16				Quarterfinals
	1	Mohd Syafiq Kamal (MAS); Aifa Azman (MAS)	11	11
	10	Renshi Makino (JPN); Risa Sugimoto (JPN)	5	3
					1	Mohd Syafiq Kamal (MAS); Aifa Azman (MAS)	7	5
					5	Tang Ming Hong (HKG); Lee Ka Yi (HKG)	11	11
	11	Nasir Iqbal (PAK); Sehrish Ali (PAK)	2	6
	5	Tang Ming Hong (HKG); Lee Ka Yi (HKG)	11	11

==== Section 2 ====
Round of 32	Round of 16				Quarterfinals
	8	Lee Min-woo (KOR); Eum Hwa-yeong (KOR)	7	7
	12	David Pelino (PHI); Jemyca Aribado (PHI)	11	11
					12	David Pelino (PHI); Jemyca Aribado (PHI)	3	5
					3	Velavan Senthilkumar (IND); Joshna Chinappa (IND)	11	11
	9	Suraj Chand (IND); Shameena Riaz (IND)	7	10
	3	Velavan Senthilkumar (IND); Joshna Chinappa (IND)	11	11

=== Bottom half ===
==== Section 3 ====
Round of 32				Round of 16					Quarterfinals
				4	Matthew Lai (HKG); Toby Tse (HKG)	11	11
	Mandakhbayaryn Amartüvshin (MGL); Pürevjavyn Khulan (MGL)	1	0	15	Samuel Quek (SGP); Jayna Lim (SGP)	6	5
15	Samuel Quek (SGP); Jayna Lim (SGP)	11	11						4	Matthew Lai (HKG); Toby Tse (HKG)	11	11
13	Asim Khan (PAK); Mehwish Ali (PAK)	11	11						13	Asim Khan (PAK); Mehwish Ali (PAK)	6	7
	Arhant Keshar Simha (NEP); Bipana Bhlon (NEP)	6	10	13	Asim Khan (PAK); Mehwish Ali (PAK)	8	11	11
				6	Naoki Hayashi (JPN); Erisa Sano (JPN)	11	10	4

==== Section 4 ====
Round of 32				Round of 16				Quarterfinals
				7	Oh Seo-jin (KOR); Heo Min-gyeong (KOR)	11	11
	Shi Yuxi (CHN); Cheng Linglu (CHN)	2	7	16	Jonathan Reyes (PHI); Aysah Dalida (PHI)	1	6
16	Jonathan Reyes (PHI); Aysah Dalida (PHI)	11	11					7	Oh Seo-jin (KOR); Heo Min-gyeong (KOR)	8	9
14	Li Haizhen (CHN); Zhang Yuning (CHN)	11	11					2	Ameeshenraj Chandaran (MAS); Rachel Arnold (MAS)	11	11
	Danzanjamtsyn Anar (MGL); Khasbaataryn Oyuungerel (MGL)	1	2	14	Li Haizhen (CHN); Zhang Yuning (CHN)	5	1
				2	Ameeshenraj Chandaran (MAS); Rachel Arnold (MAS)	11	11
