= 2026 Asian Team Squash Championships =

Asian squash tournament

- 23rd
- Location: (Pakistan) Islamabad
- Venue: Mushaf Sports Complex
- Date: 3 November – 7 November 2026
- Website; Asian Squash

Results
- Champions: Men Pakistan; Women Hong Kong
- Runners-up: Men South Korea; Women Malaysia
- Third place: Men Hong Kong / Malaysia (shared); Women Iran / South Korea (shared)

The 2026 Asian Team Squash Championships was the 23rd edition of Asian Team Squash Championships for squash players. The event was held from 3 November to 7 November 2026 at the Mushaf Sports Complex in Islamabad, Pakistan. The tournament was organised by the Pakistan Squash Federation and sanctioned by the Asian Squash Federation.

The Pakistan men's team won their 16th title and the Hong Kong women's team won their 6th title.

== Men's tournament ==
=== Group stage ===
Group A

Pos	Team	P	W	L	Pts
1	Pakistan	2	2	0	2
2	South Korea	2	1	1	1
3	Uzbekistan	2	0	2	0

Group B

Pos	Team	P	W	L	Pts
1	Malaysia	2	2	0	2
2	Hong Kong	2	1	1	1
3	Iran	2	0	2	0

=== Fifth place ===
Iran
3
Fifth place
Mushaf Sports Complex
6 November 2026

Uzbekistan
0

			1	2	3	4	5
1	(Iran) (Uzbekistan)	Sepehr Etemadpoor; Muhammadmustafo Abdurakhmonov	11; 9	11; 7	14; 12	x x	x x
2	(Iran) (Uzbekistan)	Mojtaba Kafili Vijouyeh; Yakhyokhon Nazirov	11; 9	11; 5	x x	x x	x x
3	(Iran) (Uzbekistan)	Mohammad Changanian; Botirjon Anvarjonov	11; 2	11; 2	11; 6	x x	x x

=== Semi-finals ===
Malaysia
1
Semi-final 1
Mushaf Sports Complex
6 November 2026

South Korea
2

			1	2	3	4	5
1	(Malaysia) (South Korea)	Joachim Chuah; Jeongmin Ryu	11; 5	11; 5	11; 5	x x	x x
2	(Malaysia) (South Korea)	Siow Yee Xian; Jooyoung Na	8; 11	11; 7	10; 12	11; 3	6; 11
3	(Malaysia) (South Korea)	Duncan Lee; Seojin Oh	11; 1	6; 11	7; 11	9; 11	x x

Pakistan
2
Semi-final 2
Mushaf Sports Complex
6 November 2026

Hong Kong
0

			1	2	3	4	5
1	(Pakistan) (Hong Kong)	Muhammad Asim Khan; Wong Chi Him	11; 4	6; 11	11; 7	11; 3	x x
2	(Pakistan) (Hong Kong)	Noor Zaman; Lau Tsz Kwan	5; 11	11; 5	11; 5	11; 8	x x
3	(Pakistan) (Hong Kong)

=== Final ===
Pakistan
2
Final
Mushaf Sports Complex
7 November 2026

South Korea
0

			1	2	3	4	5
1	(Pakistan) (South Korea)	Noor Zaman; Jeongmin Ryu	11; 5	11; 7	13; 11	x x	x x
2	(Pakistan) (South Korea)	Muhammad Asim Khan; Seojin Oh	11; 6	11; 5	11; 4	x x	x x
3	(Pakistan) (South Korea)

== Women's tournament ==
=== Round robin ===
Pos	Team	P	W	L	Pts
1	Hong Kong	4	4	0	4
2	Malaysia	4	3	1	3
3	Iran	4	2	2	2
4	South Korea	4	1	3	1
5	Pakistan	4	0	4	0
