= 2025 World Squash Championships =

2025 World Squash Championships may refer to:

- 2025 Men's World Squash Championship
- 2025 Women's World Squash Championship
