= Jonah Bryant =

English squash player

Personal information
- Born: 15 July 2005 (age 21) Brighton, England
- Height: 181 cm (5 ft 11 in)
- Weight: 71 kg (157 lb)

Sport
- Retired: Active
- Racquet used: Dunlop

Men's singles
- Highest ranking: No. 10 (May 2026)
- Current ranking: No. 10 (May 2026)
- Title: 7
Medal record
Men's squash
Representing England
European Team Championships
Gold medal – first place	2025 Wrocław	Team

Jonah Bryant (born 15 July 2005) is an English professional squash player. He reached a career high ranking of 10 in the world in May 2026.

== Career ==
Bryant won the European U19 title in March 2024 and in September 2024 he won his 7th PSA title after securing victory in the Budapest Open during the 2024–25 PSA Squash Tour.

In May 2025, Bryant was part of the England team that won the gold medal at the 2025 European Squash Team Championships in Wrocław, Poland.

Shortly afterwards Bryant reached the third round of the 2025 Men's World Squash Championship after securing victories over seeded players Mohamed Abouelghar and Fares Dessouky.
