= Ali Farag =

Egyptian squash player (born 1992)

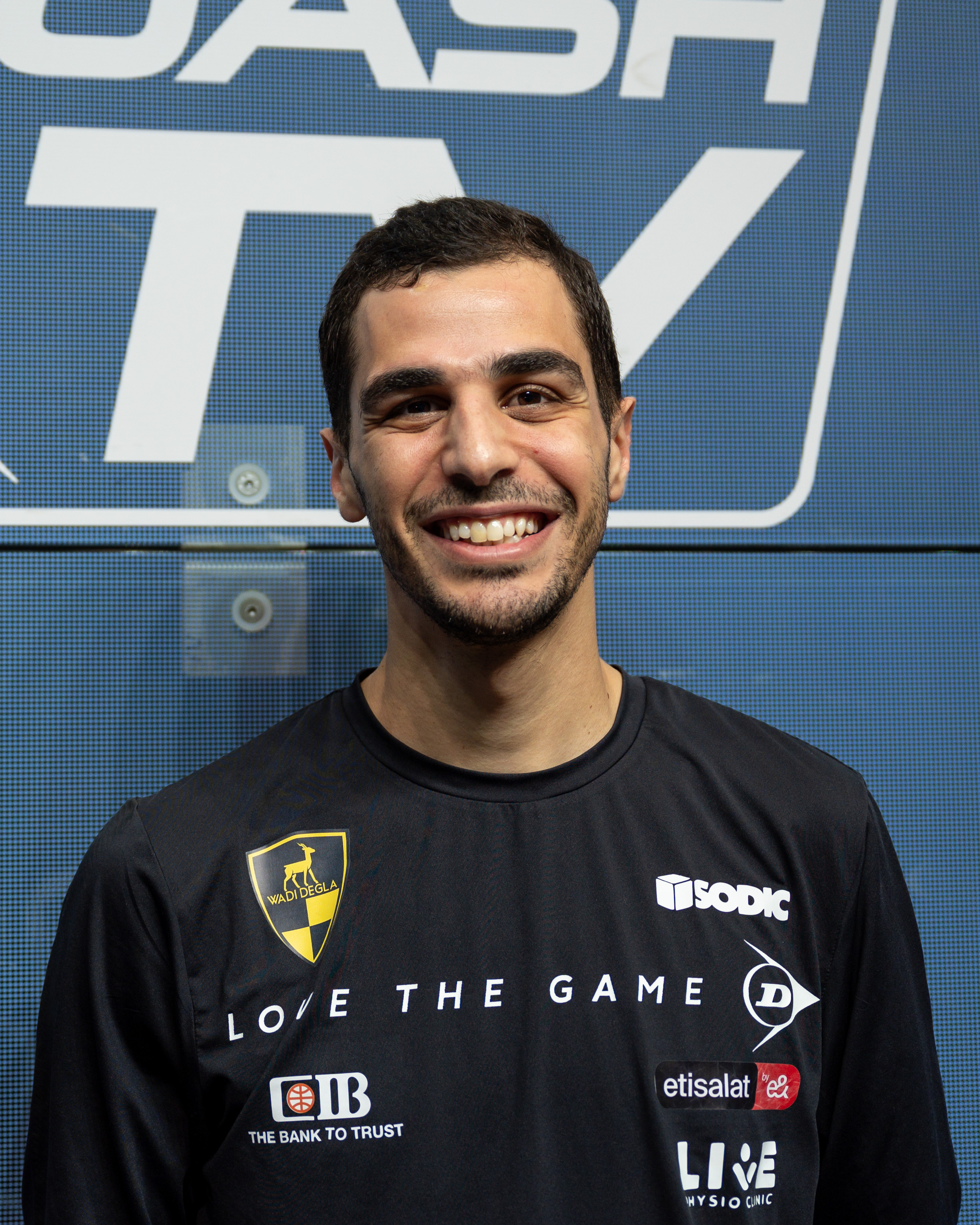
- Farag at the 2023–24 PSA World Tour Finals

Personal information
- Full name: Ali Amr Farag
- Nicknames: Mr. Fantastic, Rubber-band Man, The Raptor
- Born: 22 April 1992 (age 34) Cairo, Egypt
- Height: 1.83 m (6 ft 0 in)
- Spouse: Nour El Tayeb (m. 2016)

Sport
- Country: Egypt
- Handedness: Right handed
- Turned pro: 2009
- Coached by: Karim Darwish
- Retired: 2025
- Racquet used: Dunlop

Men's singles
- Highest ranking: No. 1 (June 2022)
- Current ranking: No. 2 (April 2025)
- Title: 46
- PSA Profile
Medal record
Men's squash
Representing Egypt
World Championships
Gold medal – first place	2019 Chicago	Singles
Gold medal – first place	2021 Chicago	Singles
Gold medal – first place	2022 Cairo	Singles
Gold medal – first place	2023 Chicago	Singles
Silver medal – second place	2025 Chicago	Singles
Bronze medal – third place	2017 Manchester	Singles
Bronze medal – third place	2024 Cairo	Singles
World Team Championships
Gold medal – first place	2017 Marseille	Team
Gold medal – first place	2019 Washington D.C.	Team
Gold medal – first place	2023 Tauranga	Team
Gold medal – first place	2024 Hong Kong	Team
British Open
Gold medal – first place	2023 Birmingham	Singles

Ali Amr Farag (Arabic: علي عمرو فرج; born 22 April 1992) is a former Egyptian professional squash player. He is a four-time world individual champion, having won the title in 2018–19, 2020–21, 2021–22 and 2022–23 and a four-times world team champion. He has a highest career world ranking of world No. 1 by the Professional Squash Association (PSA).

== Education ==
Farag graduated from Harvard University in 2014 with a degree in mechanical engineering.

Farag also graduated as one of the best squash players in college history, suffering only two defeats in his three years. As a member of Harvard's Varsity Men's Squash Team, Farag won two individual national titles and helped lead Harvard to its first team title in 17 years in 2014.

== Professional career ==
After graduating, Farag returned to the pro circuit, and began a rapid climb up the world rankings. He was named the PSA Player of the Month in April 2015 for reaching the main draw of the El Gouna Invitational as a qualifier and for winning back-to-back titles in Ireland.

Farag was part of the Egyptian team that won the 2017 Men's World Team Squash Championships in France. Farag won his first individual world title at the 2018–19 PSA Men's World Squash Championship, beating Tarek Momen in the final and continuing the recent Egyptian domination of the sport. Shortly after securing the world title he reached the final of the 2019 British Open championship, but was defeated by his fellow Egyptian Mohamed El Shorbagy.

Farag won a second World Squash Team Championships when Egypt retained their title at the 2019 Men's World Team Squash Championships in the United States.

In July 2021, he again reached the final of the British Open championship, but this time he was defeated by New Zealand's Paul Coll. However, just one month later, in August 2021, he claimed his second individual World title at the 2020–21 PSA Men's World Squash Championship.

Farag won his third individual World title at the 2022 PSA Men's World Squash Championship.

In 2023, Farag finally won his first British Open, defeating Peruvian Diego Elías in the 2023 Men's British Open Squash Championship. It was a tough and close match, with both players tiring towards the end of the third game, which Farag won. In the fourth game, Farag managed to reduce a small deficit with well-timed attacking drop shots and mixing up his attack. Farag clinched the title on the first match ball.

Farag's form continued as he reached his fourth world championship final. During the 2023 PSA Men's World Squash Championship, he defeated top seed Mostafa Asal in the semi final and then won a fourth World crown against Karim Abdel Gawad in the final. With that victory Farag joined Amr Shabana and Geoff Hunt in the all-time list with four world title wins.

Farag secured a third World team title in December 2023 at the 2023 Men's World Team Squash Championships. In 2024, Farag reached the semi final of the individual world title in May before winning a fourth World team title at the 2024 Men's World Team Squash Championships in Hong Kong during December.

In April 2025, Farag won his 46th PSA title by securing victory in the Grasshopper Cup during the 2024–25 PSA Squash Tour. In May 2025, Farag reached the final of the 2025 Men's World Squash Championship in Chicago but was unable to win a fifth world title after being defeated by Mostafa Asal.

Farag announced his retirement in May 2025.

== Personal life ==
He is married to fellow squash professional Nour El Tayeb. The pair set a new record by becoming the first married couple to both win the same major title on the same day after winning the US Open in 2017. The couple came close to repeating the feat in the 2019 US Open, but Tayeb lost her final in a narrow 5-game thriller.

== Titles and Finals ==
=== Major Finals (30) ===
Major tournaments include:

- PSA World Championships
- PSA World Tour Finals
- Top-tier PSA World Tour tournaments (Platinum+Diamond/World Series/Super Series)

Year	Tournament	Opponent	Result	Score
2017	U.S. Open	Mohamed El Shorbagy	Win (1)	12-10 11-9 11–8
2017	Hong Kong Open	Mohamed El Shorbagy	Loss (1)	6-11 11-5 4-11 11-7 3–11
2018	El Gouna International	Marwan El Shorbagy	Loss (2)	8-11 5-11 4–11
2017-18	PSA World Series Finals	Mohamed El Shorbagy	Loss (3)	11-9 3-11 9-11 8–11
2018	Qatar Classic	Simon Rösner	Win (2)	11-9 11-7 11–5
2018	Hong Kong Open	Mohamed El Shorbagy	Loss (4)	6-11 7-11 7–11
2018	Black Ball Open	Karim Abdel Gawad	Loss (5)	6-11 11-13 11-7 8–11
2019	Tournament of Champions	Mohamed El Shorbagy	Win (3)	10-12 6-11 11-6 11-3 11–8
2018-19	PSA World Championships	Tarek Momen	Win (4)	11-5 11-13 13-11 11–3
2019	El Gouna International	Karim Abdel Gawad	Win (5)	11-9 12-10 11–3
2019	British Open	Mohamed El Shorbagy	Loss (6)	9-11 11-5 11-8 5-11 9–11
2019	U.S. Open (2)	Mohamed El Shorbagy	Win (6)	11-4 11-7 11–2
2019	Egyptian Open	Karim Abdel Gawad	Loss (7)	6-11 8-11 8–11
2020	Windy City Open	Paul Coll	Win (7)	12-14 9-11 11-7 11-6 11–1
2020	Egyptian Open	Tarek Momen	Win (8)	11-9 11-3 11–4
2020	Qatar Classic (2)	Paul Coll	Win (9)	11-8 6-11 11-9 11–9
2020-21	PSA World Championships (2)	Mohamed El Shorbagy	Win (10)	7-11 12-10 11-9 11–4
2021	British Open	Paul Coll	Loss (8)	11-6 6-11 6-11 8–11
2021	Egyptian Open (2)	Mohamed El Shorbagy	Win (11)	6-11 9-11 11-2 11-6 11–5
2022	British Open	Paul Coll	Loss (9)	10-12 6-11 4–11
2022	PSA World Championships (3)	Mohamed El Shorbagy	Win (12)	9-11 11-8 7-11 11-9 11–2
2022	Egyptian Open (3)	Paul Coll	Win (13)	11-6 8-11 11-4 11–7
2022	U.S. Open	Diego Elias	Loss (10)	0-2 (retired)
2023	British Open	Diego Elías	Win (14)	13-11 5-11 11-8 11–9
2022-23	PSA World Championships (4)	Karim Abdel Gawad	Win (15)	12-10 11-6 11–6
2023	El Gouna International (2)	Mostafa Asal	Win (16)	12-10 10-12 11-6 11–2
2023	Paris Squash	Diego Elías	Win (17)	2-11 13-11 11-1 11–9
2023	Qatar Classic (3)	Diego Elías	Win (18)	15-13 11-5 8-11 11–9
2023	U.S. Open	Paul Coll	Loss (11)	7-11 7-11 11-8 11-8 10–12
2023	Hong Kong Open	Paul Coll	Loss (12)	12-10 3-11 8-11 11-8 9–11
