= Paul Coll =

New Zealand squash player (born 1992)

Paul Coll ONZM
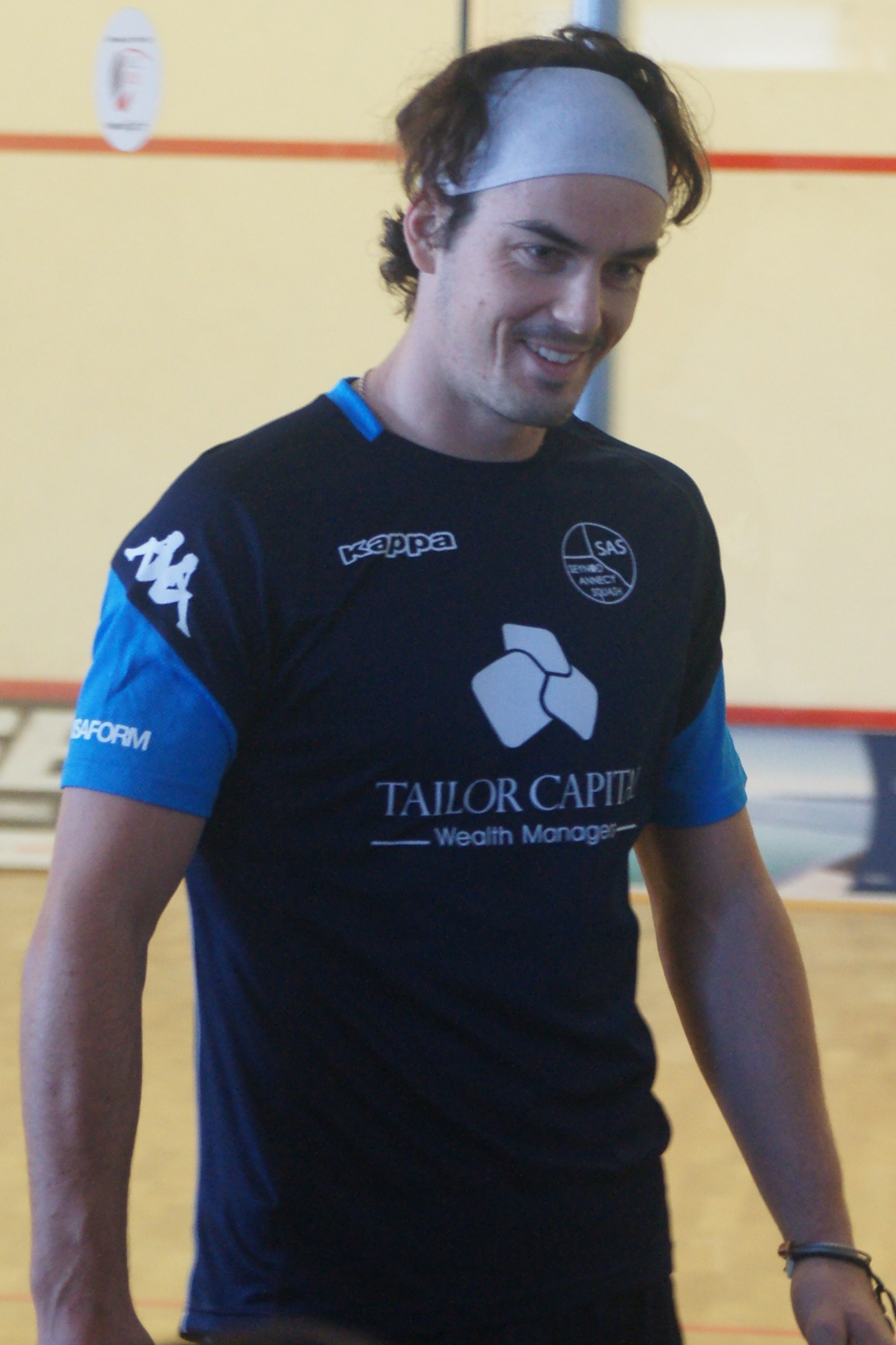
- Coll in 2018

Personal information
- Full name: Paul Daniel Coll
- Born: 9 May 1992 (age 34) Greymouth, New Zealand
- Height: 1.79 m (5 ft 10 in)
- Weight: 83 kg (183 lb)

Sport
- Country: New Zealand
- Handedness: Right Handed
- Turned pro: 2010
- Coached by: Rob Owen
- Retired: Active
- Racquet used: Head

Men's singles
- Highest ranking: No. 1 (March 2022)
- Current ranking: No. 2 (February 2026)
- Title: 32
- PSA Profile
Medal record
Men's squash
Representing New Zealand
World Championships
Silver medal – second place	2020 Doha	Singles
Bronze medal – third place	2021 Chicago	Singles
Bronze medal – third place	2022 Cairo	Singles
Bronze medal – third place	2024 Cairo	singles
Bronze medal – third place	2025 Chicago	Singles
World Doubles Championships
Gold medal – first place	2016 Darwin	Mixed doubles
Gold medal – first place	2017 Manchester	Mixed doubles
Bronze medal – third place	2016 Darwin	Doubles
Bronze medal – third place	2017 Manchester	Doubles
Commonwealth Games
Gold medal – first place	2022 Birmingham	Singles
Gold medal – first place	2022 Birmingham	Mixed Doubles
Silver medal – second place	2018 Gold Coast	Singles
Bronze medal – third place	2018 Gold Coast	Mixed doubles
British Open
Gold medal – first place	2021 Hull	Singles
Gold medal – first place	2022 Hull	Singles

Paul Daniel Coll ONZM (born 9 May 1992) is a New Zealand professional squash player. In March 2022, he became the first New Zealand man to achieve a world ranking of World No. 1. He is a three times British Open champion, having won this tournament in 2021, 2022 and 2026.

== Career ==
While Coll never achieved the same success in his junior career that he would see at the professional level, his first major breakthrough came when he was ranked 31st in the world and won the $100,000 St. George's Hill Classic in Weybridge, England, as a qualifier. He beat 4 players in the top 20 to win the title, which raised him to no. 20 in the world. He made history in September 2017 when he became no. 10 in the PSA World Rankings. He is only the fourth New Zealander to break the top 10 in the world, the ones before him, including former world champion and world no. 2 Ross Norman.

Coll claimed his first Commonwealth Games medal at the 2018 Commonwealth Games as he clinched a silver medal in the men's singles event after being defeated by veteran English squash player, James Willstrop. On the other side, fellow New Zealand squash player, Joelle King clinched a historical gold medal in the women's singles event. This was also the first instance where a male and a female squash player from New Zealand had managed to qualify in the final of the respective events at a Commonwealth Games event.

In September 2019, Coll won the 2019 Open De France Nantes in France. Coll was able to take the final in three games (12–10, 11–3, 11–9), defeating Joel Makin. On 22 August 2021, Paul Coll won the British Open championship and became the first New Zealander to win the British Open men's squash title.

In March 2022, Coll became the first New Zealander men's world no. 1 squash player, surpassing Ross Norman as the highest-ranked male squash player from New Zealand. Coll enjoyed more success in March when he won his first Windy City Open title in Chicago after coming back from two games down against Youssef Ibrahim of Egypt. The next month in April, he successfully defended his 2021 British Open title without dropping a single set the entire tournament. He defeated Ali Farag in a repeat of the 2021 final.

In August 2022, Coll took home his first gold medal in the men's singles event at the 2022 Commonwealth Games and became the first New Zealander to win gold in this event after beating Welshman Joel Makin in a tight five-game contest. Also in 2022, Coll won the bronze medal at the 2022 PSA Men's World Squash Championship.

In the 2023 New Year Honours, Coll was appointed an Officer of the New Zealand Order of Merit, for services to squash. In May 2023, he reached the quarter final of the 2023 PSA Men's World Squash Championship, before losing to rival Ali Farag. In October 2023, he won the United States Open.

Coll married Belgian professional squash player Nele Gilis in July 2024.

In May 2025, Coll reached the semi-final of the 2025 Men's World Squash Championship in Chicago but was defeated by number 1 seed and four-time champion Ali Farag. The following month he reached the semi final of the 2025 Men's British Open Squash Championship, losing to Diego Elías.

During the 2025–26 PSA Squash Tour, Coll won the London Classic, Qatar Classic, Squash In The Land, New Zealand Open and Australian Open.

== Titles and finals ==
=== Major finals (13) ===
Major tournaments include:

- PSA World Championships
- PSA World Tour Finals
- Top-tier PSA World Tour tournaments (Platinum/World Series/Super Series)

Year/Season	Tournament	Opponent	Result	Score
2019–20	PSA World Championships	Tarek Momen	Loss (1)	8–11 3–11 4–11
2020	Windy City Open	Ali Farag	Loss (2)	14–12 11–9 7–11 6–11 1–11
2020	Qatar Classic	Ali Farag	Loss (3)	8–11 11–6 9–11 9–11
2021	El Gouna International	Mohamed El Shorbagy	Loss (4)	5–11 2–11 7–11
2021	British Open	Ali Farag	Win (1)	6–11 11–6 11–6 11–8
2021	Qatar Classic	Diego Elías	Loss (5)	11–13 11–5 11–13 9–11
2022	Windy City Open	Youssef Ibrahim	Win (2)	7–11 10–12 11–4 11–7 11–9
2022	British Open (2)	Ali Farag	Win (3)	12–10 11–6 11–4
2022	El Gouna International	Mostafa Asal	Loss (6)	8–11 9–11 5–11
2021–22	PSA World Tour Finals	Mostafa Asal	Loss (7)	11–13 8–11 7–11
2022	Egyptian Open	Ali Farag	Loss (8)	6–11 11–8 4–11 7–11
2023	U.S. Open	Ali Farag	Win (4)	11–7 11–7 8–11 8–11 12–10
2023	Hong Kong Open	Ali Farag	Win (5)	10–12 11–3 11–8 8–11 11–9

== Personal life ==
Coll's uncle was the New Zealand rugby league player Tony Coll.
