= Ameeshenraj Chandaran =

Malaysian squash player (born 2004)

Personal information
- Full name: Ameeshenraj Chandaran
- Born: January 31, 2004 (age 22) Seremban, Malaysia
- Education: UWE Bristol
- Weight: 65 kg (143 lb)

Sport
- Country: Malaysia
- Handedness: Right-handed
- Turned pro: 2019
- Retired: Active

Men's singles
- Highest ranking: No. 92 (December 2024)
- Current ranking: No. 92 (December 2024)
- Title: Liverpool Cricket Club Open (2024)
Medal record
Asian Games
Gold medal – first place	2026 Aichi-Nagoya	Team
Bronze medal – third place	2026 Aichi–Nagoya	Mixed Doubles

Ameeshenraj Chandaran (born 31 January 2004) is a Malaysian professional squash player. He reached a career high ranking of 92 in the world during December 2024.

== Career ==
Chandaran won the 2023 PSNS President's Trophy tournament of the world tour. Additionally, Chandaran emerged victorious in the Liverpool Cricket Club Open in 2024.

He was the 2019 British Junior Open Squash champion in the under-15 category.

In 2024, Chandaran won his 3rd PSA title after securing victory in the 79 CCI Western India.
