= Noor Zaman =

Pakistani squash player (born 2004)

Personal information
- Born: 1 April 2004 (age 22) Peshawar, Pakistan
- Height: 1.85 m (6 ft 1 in)
- Relative: Qamar Zaman (grandfather)

Sport
- Country: Pakistan
- Handedness: Right-handed
- Turned pro: 2019
- Racquet used: Dunlop
- Highest ranking: 22
- Current ranking: 23 (November 2026)
- Title: 5
- Tour final: 11
- PSA Profile
Medal record
Men's squash
Representing Pakistan
Asian Games
Silver medal – second place	2022 Hangzhou	Team
Silver medal – second place	2026 Aichi–Nagoya	Team
Bronze medal – third place	2026 Aichi–Nagoya	Singles
Asian Championships
Gold medal – first place	2026 Islamabad	Team
Silver medal – second place	2025 Kuching	Doubles
Silver medal – second place	2026 Sarawak	Doubles
Bronze medal – third place	2024 Dalian	Team
U23 World Championships
Gold medal – first place	2025 Karachi	Singles
Asian Junior Championships
Gold medal – first place	2022 Na Chom Thian	Singles
Gold medal – first place	2023 Chennai	Team

Noor Zaman PP (born 1 April 2004) is a Pakistani squash player. Noor won the inaugural 2025 U23 World Squash Championship in Karachi, and has secured multiple medals at the Asian Games, Asian Championships including team and doubles events, and junior championships alongside other PSA titles, and was subsequently awarded the President's Pride of Performance, becoming the third generation of his family to receive the honour after his grandfather Qamar Zaman and uncle Mansoor Zaman.

== Family ==
Noor Zaman comes from one of Pakistan's most legendary squash families, spanning three generations of champions. He is the grandson of Qamar Zaman, the former World No. 1 and 1975 British Open champion, and the nephew of Mansoor Zaman (former World No. 11) and Shahid Zaman (former World No. 14). His father, Munawwar Zaman, was also a professional player and coach who, alongside his grandfather, oversaw Noor's training from a young age.

== Career ==
In June 2022, Noor won the U19 Asian Junior Individual Squash Championships title.

In February 2023, he was part of the team that won the Asian Junior Team Squash Championships.

In September 2023, he was part of the men's team that won a silver medal at the 2022 Asian Games. In the final against India, he played against Abhay Singh, and was defeated, winning two games out of five. The team won the silver medal.

In June 2024, he was part of the men's team that finished third at the 22nd Asian Team Squash Championships in Dalian, China.

In November 2024, he won his 2nd PSA title after securing victory in the CAS Serena Hotels International during the 2024–25 PSA Squash Tour.

In March 2025 he won the Liverpool Cricket Club Open (his 3rd PSA title) and a 15k PSA Challenger event, defeating Rory Stewart 3-0 in the final.

In April 2025, he won the inaugural Under-23 World Squash Championship. On 10 April 2025, he clinched the title in Karachi defeating Egypt's Kareem El Torkey 3-2 in a thrilling final comeback (5-11, 12-14, 11-8, 11-5, 11-6).

In June 2025, Zaman and Nasir Iqbal lost 2-1 (9-11, 11-5, 11-5) to India's Abhay Singh and Velavan Senthilkumar in the final of the men’s title at the 2nd Asian Doubles Squash Championships in Kuching, Malaysia.

In August 2025, Zaman finished his men's singles campaign as the plate event runner-up after he was forced to retire against South Africa's Dewald van Niekerk due to illness at the 2025 World Games in Chengdu, China.

In September 2025, he won his 4th PSA title after securing victory in the NASH Cup and won a 5th (the CAS International) in November 2025, during the 2025–26 PSA Squash Tour.

In December 2025, Zaman who represents WAPDA, won the men’s individual gold medal with a 3-1 win over Pakistan Army’s Huzaifa Ibrahim at the 35th National Games of Pakistan in Karachi.

In June 2026, Zaman and Nasir Iqbal lost 2-1 (7-11, 11-7, 11-2) to India's Abhay Singh and Velavan Senthilkumar in the final of the men’s title at the 3rd Asian Doubles Squash Championships in Sarawak, Malaysia.

In September 2026, he served as one of Pakistan’s flag-bearers alongside cricketer Fatima Sana during the opening ceremony of the 2026 Asian Games. He won bronze medal in men's singles and silver in men's team events at the Games.

In October 2026, Noor secured a major career win by stunning former world champion and defending titleholder Karim Abdel Gawad to reach the quarter-finals of the Silicon Valley Open.

In November 2026, he was part of the team that won the 23rd Asian Team Squash Championships in Islamabad, securing Pakistan's 16th title in the tournament.

== Awards and honours ==
In August 2026, Zaman was named among the President of Pakistan’s Pride of Performance award recipients for his contribution in squash.
