= Auguste Dussourd =

French squash player (born 1996)

Personal information
- Born: 10 February 1996 (age 30) Nogent-sur-Marne, France
- Education: University of Oxford
- Height: 184 cm (6 ft 0 in)
- Weight: 70 kg (154 lb)

Sport
- Country: France
- Turned pro: 2013
- Retired: Active
- Highest ranking: No. 21 (August 2023)
- Current ranking: No. 23 (14 July 2025)
- Title: 8
- Tour final: 15
Medal record
Men's squash
Representing France
World Team Championships
Bronze medal – third place	2023 Tauranga	Team
European Team Championships
Silver medal – second place	2023 Helsinki	Team
Silver medal – second place	2025 Wrocław	Team

Auguste Dussourd (born 10 February 1996) is a French professional squash player. Dussourd reached a career high ranking of 21 in the world during August 2023.

== Career ==
In December 2023, Dussourd won a bronze medal with France, at the 2023 Men's World Team Squash Championships in New Zealand.
