= Tang Ming Hong =

Hong Kong squash player (born 1993)

Ming Hong Tang
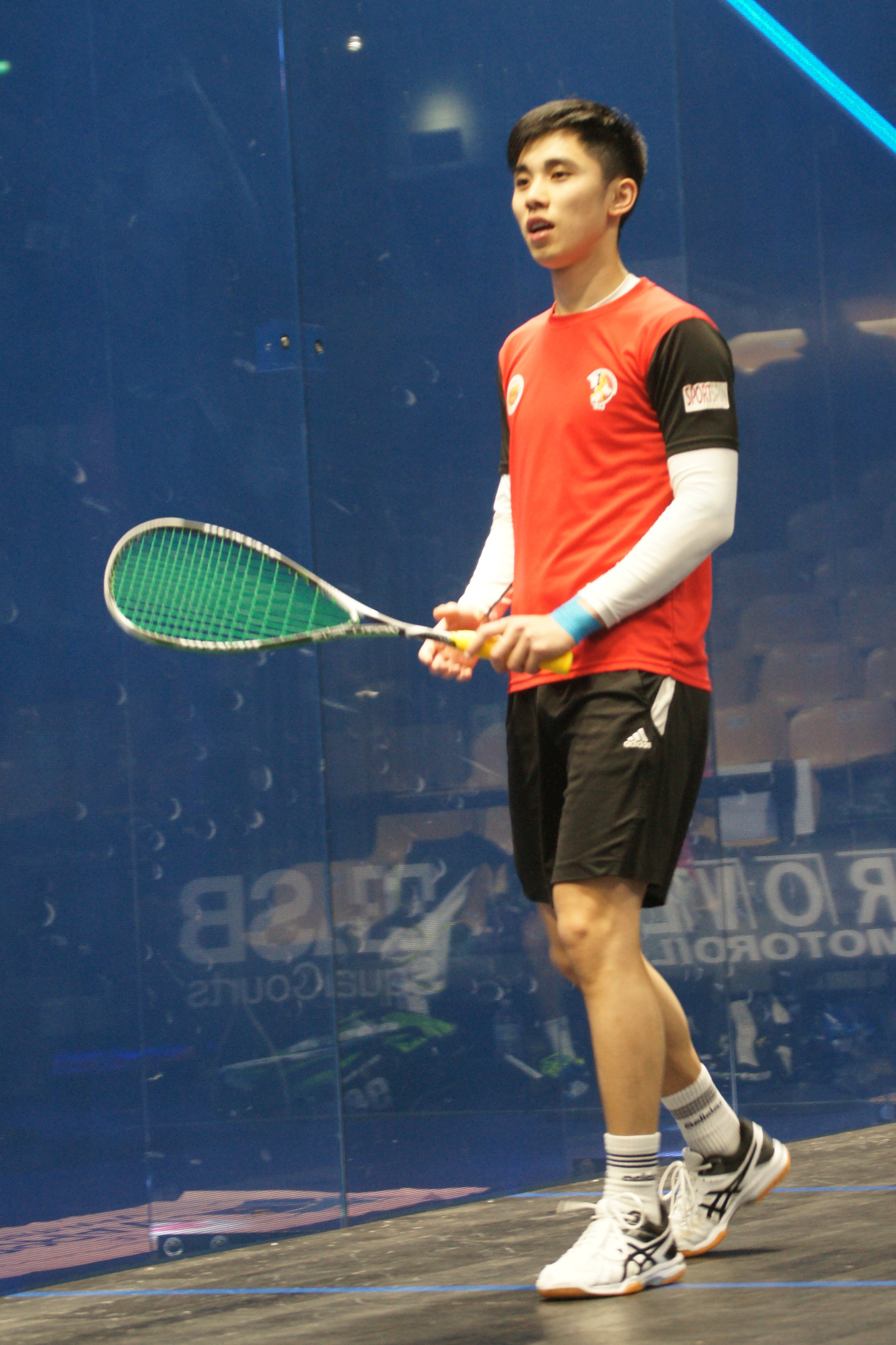
- Tang Ming-Hong at the 2017 Men's World Team Squash Championships

Personal information
- Born: July 23, 1993 (age 33) Hong Kong
- Height: 174 cm (5 ft 9 in)
- Weight: 64 kg (141 lb)

Sport
- Handedness: Left Handed
- Coached by: Abdul Faheem Khan
- Retired: Active
- Racquet used: Dunlop

Men's singles
- Highest ranking: No. 79 (January 2024)
- Current ranking: No. 144 (November 2025)
- Title: 6
Medal record
Men's squash
Representing Hong Kong
Asian Games
Gold medal – first place	2026 Aichi–Nagoya	Mixed doubles
Bronze medal – third place	2014 Incheon	Team
- Updated on February, 2018

Ming Hong Tang (Chinese: 鄧銘漮 or 鄧卓仁), also known as Cheuk Yan Tang (born 23 July 1993) is a Hong Kong professional squash player. He reached a career high ranking of 79 in the world during January 2024.

== Biography ==
On 23 July 1993, Tang was born in Hong Kong.

In 2016 he won his first PSA title, the Singapore Open, defeating runner-up Malaysian Elvinn Keo.

In November 2025, he won his 6th PSA title after securing victory in the Singapore Challenger during the 2025–26 PSA Squash Tour.

== Selected tournament results ==
- Bronze medal at the Incheon 2014 Asian games representing Team Hong Kong.
- Champion at the 2018 Singapore Open.
- Runner-up at the 2017 PSA Perrier Challenge Cup.
- Champion at the 2018 Malaysian Squash Tour IV.
