= Faraz Khan =

American professional squash player (born 1993)

Personal information
- Born: September 12, 1993 (age 32) Trenton, NJ, United States
- Height: 177 cm (5 ft 10 in)
- Weight: 70 kg (154 lb)

Sport
- Country: United States
- Turned pro: 2014
- Coached by: Victor Montserrat
- Retired: Active
- Racquet used: Black Knight
- Highest ranking: No. 42 (November 2023)
- Current ranking: No. 57 (January 2024)
- Updated on January 2019

Faraz Khan (born 12 September 1993 in Trenton, NJ) is an American professional squash player. As of January 2024, he was ranked number 57 in the world.
