= Rui Soares =

Portuguese squash player (born 1993)

Personal information
- Born: October 5, 1993 (age 32) Porto, Portugal

Sport
- Country: Portugal
- Handedness: right
- Turned pro: 2012
- Retired: Active
- Racquet used: Head
- Highest ranking: No. 65 (September 2021)
- Current ranking: No. 65 (September 2021)
- Updated on September 2021

Rui Soares (born 5 October 1993 in Porto) is a Portuguese professional squash player. As of September 2022, he was ranked number 62 in the world, and number 1 in Portugal. He has competed in the main draw of multiple professional PSA tournaments, and has won 2, reaching a total of 5 finals.
