= Nagoya Kinjo-Futo Arena =

Futsal arena in Japan

Coordinates: 35°2′55.9″N 136°50′49.9″E

Takeda Teva Ocean Arena
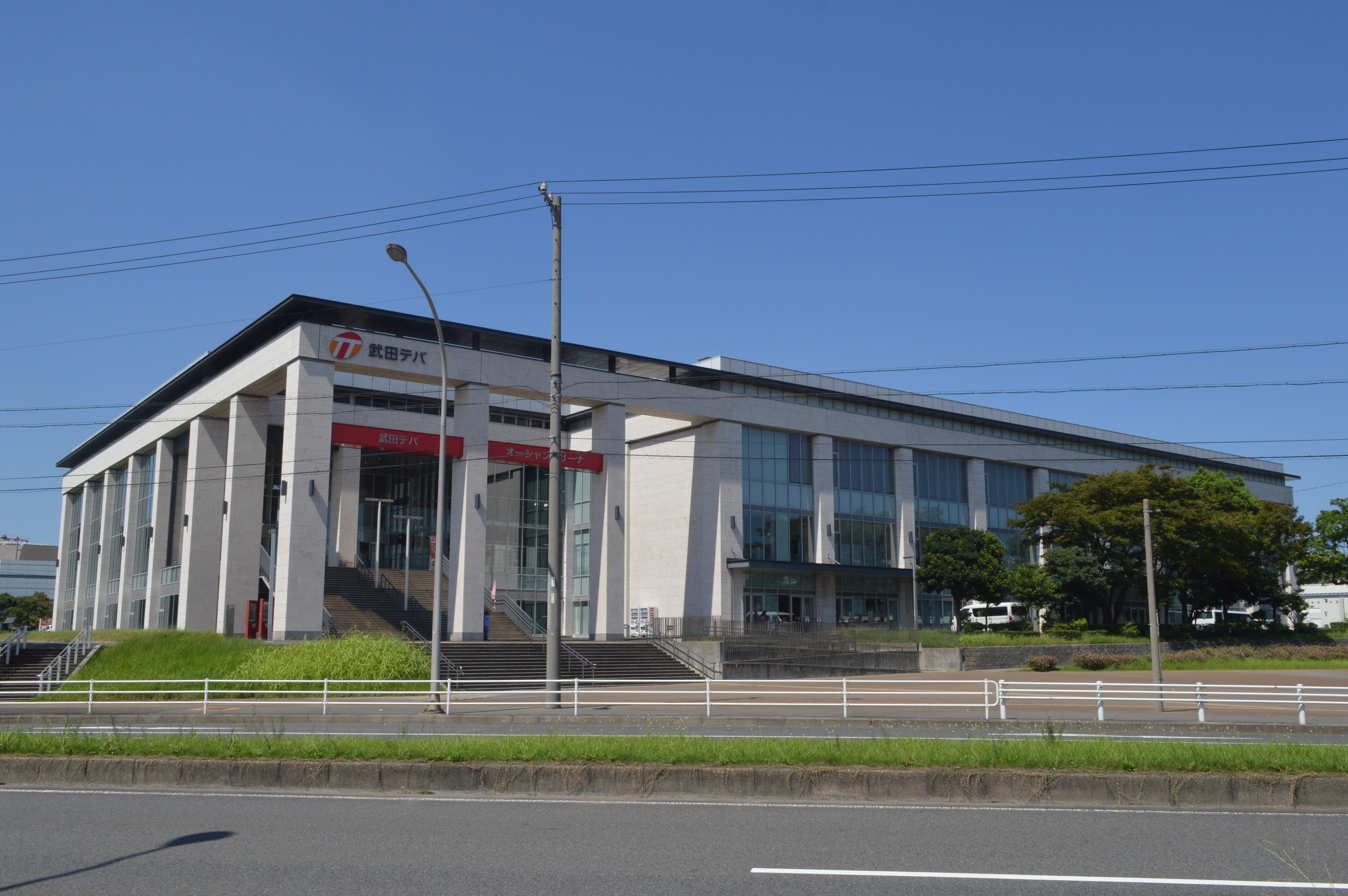
- front view
- Interactive map of Takeda Teva Ocean Arena
- Location: Minato-ku, Nagoya City, Aichi Prefecture, Japan
- Owner: Teva Takeda Pharma Ltd.
- Operator: Nagoya Oceans
- Capacity: 2,569

Construction
- Opened: 13 June 2008
- Architects: Yasui Architects & Engineers, Horiuchi Architectural
- Main contractor: Kajima Corporation

Tenants
- 2026 Asian Games; 2008– Nagoya Oceans (F.League)

Website
- http://ocean-arena.com/

Takeda Teva Ocean Arena (In Japanese : 武田テバオーシャンアリーナ) is a futsal arena in Nagoya, Aichi Prefecture, Japan. This arena opened on 13 June 2008. This arena is specialized to futsal first in Asia. This arena is home arena of Nagoya Oceans in F.League. The exterior of this arena is inspired by Colosseum.

== History ==
- 8 February 2007 – Start to construction.
- 2 May 2008 – Finish to construction.
- 13 June 2008 – Opened under the name Taiyo Pharmaceutical Ocean Arena.
- June 2008 – F.League Ocean Cup 1st edition was held.
- 1 April 2012 – Renamed to Teva Ocean Arena.
- August 2013 – 2013 AFC Futsal Club Championship was held.
- 1 April 2017 – Renamed to Takeda Teva Ocean Arena.
- 20 May 2017 – WBO world light flyweight title match Kosei Tanaka vs Ángel Acosta (no.1 contender and mandatory challenger of WBO) was held.
- 6–7 April 2019 – V.League 2018-19 Final was held.
- 2023 – Renamed to Nagoya Kinjo-Futo Arena.

== Facilities ==
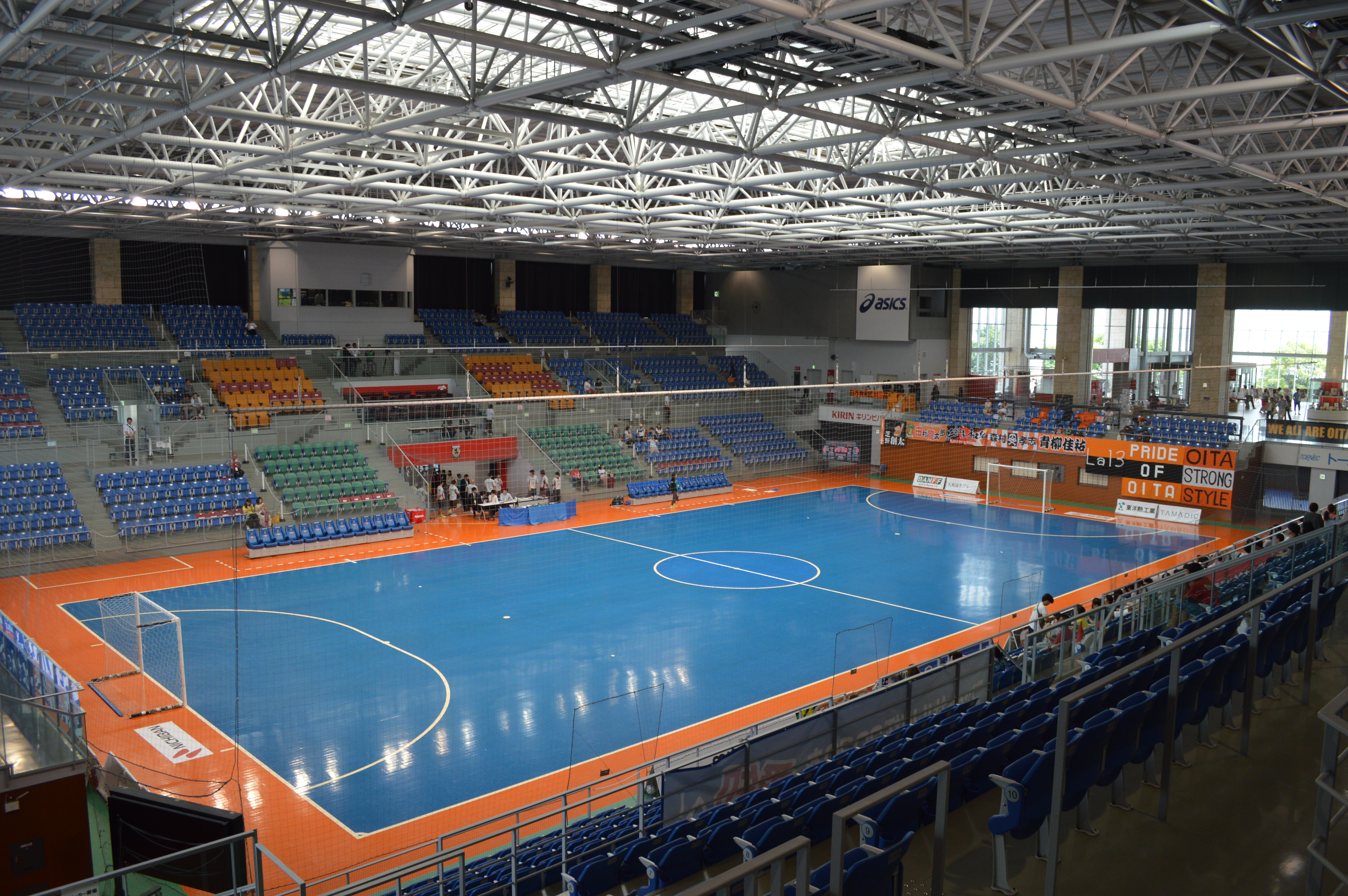
Inside the arena.

Main Arena

- Pitch size – 20 m × 40 m (800 m^{2})
- Height – 13 m
- Seats – 2,569 seats

Sub Arena

- Pitch size – 20 m × 40 m (800 m^{2})
- Height – 13 m
- Seats – 190 seats

== Access ==
- 1 minute walk from Aonami Line Kinjō-futō Station.
