= Mohamed ElSherbini =

Egyptian squash player (born 1992)

Personal information
- Born: September 15, 1992 (age 33) Alexandria, Egypt

Sport
- Country: Egypt
- Turned pro: 2010
- Retired: Active
- Racquet used: Tecnifibre

Men's singles
- Highest ranking: No. 15 (September 2023)
- Current ranking: No. 29 (14 July 2025)
- Title: 11
- Tour final: 16
- Updated on January 2024

Mohamed ElSherbini (born 15 September 1992) is an Egyptian professional squash player. He reached his career-best ranking of World No. 15, on 18 September 2023.
