= Bernat Jaume =

Spanish squash player (born 1995)

Personal information
- Born: November 19, 1995 (age 30) Igualada, Spain

Sport
- Country: Spain
- Turned pro: 2013
- Retired: Active
- Racquet used: Tecnifibre
- Highest ranking: No. 37 (June 2025)
- Current ranking: No. 37 (14 July 2025)
- Updated on Aug 2022

Bernat Jaume (born 19 November 1995 in Igualada) is a Spanish professional squash player. He reached a career high ranking of 41 in the world during November 2024.
