= Nathan Lake =

English squash player (born 1992)

Personal information
- Born: 3 July 1992 (age 34) Cheltenham, England

Sport
- Retired: Active
- Highest ranking: No. 22 (March 2024)
- Current ranking: No. 43 (14 July 2025)
Medal record
Men's squash
Representing England
World Team Championships
Silver medal – second place	2024 Hong Kong	Team
European Team Championships
Gold medal – first place	2022 Eindhoven	Team

Nathan Lake (born 3 July 1992) is an English professional squash player. He reached a career high ranking of 22 in the world during March 2024.

== Career ==
Lake first joined the PSA Tour in 2010 and won his first title in 2015, when he won the Keith Grainger Memorial Open.

By 2013 he had reached the world's top 100 players and later won the Jersey Squash Classic, Novum Energy Texas Open Squash Championships, E.M. Noll Classic and the Qualico Manitoba Open.

In 2021, he won the T.H. Quinn Cincinnati Queen City Open and the Wakefield PSA and in 2022 won the Nash Cup. In September 2022, he hit a career best world ranking (at the time) of 33. He was a member of the England team that won the European Squash Team Championships in 2022.

In August 2024, Lake won his 9th PSA title after securing victory in the White Bear Challenge during the 2024–25 PSA Squash Tour. In December 2024, Lake won a silver medal with England, at the 2024 Men's World Team Squash Championships in Hong Kong.
