= Asim Khan (squash player) =

Pakistani squash player (born 1996)

Muhammad Asim Khan
Personal information
- Nationality: Pakistani
- Born: 29 October 1996 (age 30) Lahore, Pakistan
- Weight: 76 kg (168 lb)

Sport
- Handedness: Right-handed
- Retired: Active
- Racquet used: HEAD
- Highest ranking: No. 53 (October 2022)
- Current ranking: No. 72 (April 2026)
- Title: 13
Medal record
Men's squash
Representing Pakistan
Asian Games
Silver medal – second place	2022 Hangzhou	Team
Silver medal – second place	2026 Aichi–Nagoya	Team
Bronze medal – third place	2018 Jakarta	Team
Asian Championships
Gold medal – first place	2026 Islamabad	Team
Silver medal – second place	2018 Cheongju	Team
Bronze medal – third place	2024 Dalian	Team
South Asian Games
Gold medal – first place	2019 Nepal	Team

Asim Khan (born 29 October 1996, in Lahore) is a Pakistani professional squash player. He reached a career high ranking of 53 in the world during October 2022.

== Biography ==
Khan was a member of Pakistan's silver-winning squash team at the 2022 Asian Games, and the bronze-winning squash team at the 2018 Asian Games.

In January 2026, he won his 12th PSA title after securing victory in the Washington Open during the 2025–26 PSA Squash Tour. A 13th title eas secured when he won the Asian World Championship Qualifying Event.
