= Henry Leung (squash player) =

Hong Kong squash player (born 1995)

Personal information
- Born: March 10, 1995 (age 31) Hong Kong

Sport
- Country: Hong Kong
- Handedness: Right Handed
- Coached by: Abdul Faheem Khan
- Retired: Active
- Racquet used: Tecnifibre
- Highest ranking: No. 46 (December 2022)
- Current ranking: No. 48 (14 July 2025)
Medal record
Men's squash
Representing Hong Kong
World Cup
Silver medal – second place	2025 Chennai	Team
Asian Games
Silver medal – second place	2018 Jakarta	Men's team
- Updated on February, 2018

Henry Leung (born 10 March 1995) is a Hong Kong professional squash player. As of June 2024, he is ranked number 48 in the world. He is coached by Abdul Faheem Khan.
