= Abdulla Al-Tamimi =

Qatari squash player (born 1994)

Personal information
- Full name: Abdulla Mohamed Al-Tamimi
- Born: December 15, 1994 (age 31) Doha, Qatar
- Height: 1.70 m (5 ft 7 in)
- Weight: 63 kg (139 lb)

Sport
- Country: Qatar
- Turned pro: 2011
- Coached by: Geoff Hunt, Dan Jenson, Rodney Martin (squash player), Stewart Boswell and Jonathon Kemp
- Retired: Active

Men's singles
- Highest ranking: No. 16 (October 2023)
- Current ranking: No. 22 (14 July 2025)
- Title: 11

Abdulla Mohamed Al-Tamimi (born 15 December 1994) is a professional squash player who represents Qatar. He reached a career-high world ranking of World No. 16 in October 2023.

== Career ==
In 2024, Al-Tamimi won his 11th PSA title after securing victory in the Cape Town Squash Open during the 2024–25 PSA Squash Tour.
