= Lau Tsz Kwan =

Hong Kong squash player (born 1996)

Tsz Kwan Lau Alex
Personal information
- Born: February 5, 1996 (age 30) Hong Kong

Sport
- Country: Hong Kong
- Handedness: Right Handed
- Turned pro: 2015
- Coached by: Abdul Faheem Khan
- Retired: Active
- Racquet used: Tecnifibre

Men's singles
- Highest ranking: No. 40 (November 2023)
- Current ranking: No. 40 (December 2024)
Medal record
Men's squash
Representing Hong Kong
World Cup
Silver medal – second place	2025 Chennai	Team
Asian Championships
Gold medal – first place	2025 Kuala Lumpur	Individual
- Updated on August 2022

Tsz Kwan Lau, also known as Alex Lau Tsz Kwan (born 5 February 1996) is a Hong Kong professional squash player. He reached a career high ranking of 40 in the world during November 2023. He is coached by Abdul Faheem Khan.

In 2025, he won the Men's singles of the Asian Individual Squash Championships, which was the fourth Hong Kong male player to capture the title.
