= 2022 Women's Asian Squash Team Championships =

2022 Asian Squash Team Championships
- 19th Women's Asian Squash Team Championships
- Location: Cheongju, South Korea
- Venue: Cheongju International Squash Stadium
- Date: 31 October – 4 November

Results
- Champions: Hong Kong
- Runners-up: Malaysia
- Third place: India, South Korea (shared)

The 2022 Women's Asian Squash Team Championships was the 21st edition of Asian women's team championship for squash players. The event was held at Cheongju International Squash Stadium in Cheongju, South Korea, from 31 October to 4 November 2022.

== Participating teams and seeds ==
1. Malaysia
2. Hong Kong
3. India
4. Japan

5. South Korea
6. Iran
7. Singapore
8. Chinese Taipei

== Group stage ==
=== Pool A ===
Pos.	Team	Players	TPd	TPt	MP	Qualification
1	Malaysia	Aifa Azman, Rachel Arnold, Chan Yiwen, Yee Xin Ying	3	3	9	Semifinals
2	South Korea	Eum Hwa-yeong, Yang Yeon-soo, Choe Yu-ra, Heo Min-gyeong	3	2	5	Semifinals
3	Japan	Satomi Watanabe, Akari Midorikawa, Risa Sugimoto, Erisa Sano Herring	3	1	4	5th - 8th places
4	Chinese Taipei	Lee Yi-hsuan, Wang Yuan, Wu Yi-chun, Chen Pin-yu	3	0	0	5th - 8th places

Malaysia
3

Court D
31 October 2022

South Korea
0

			1	2	3	4	5
1	(Malaysia) (South Korea)	Aifa Azman; Eum Hwa-yeong	11; 6	11; 5	11; 4
2	(Malaysia) (South Korea)	Chan Yiwen; Choe Yu-ra	11; 5	11; 7	11; 7
3	(Malaysia) (South Korea)	Rachel Arnold; Yang Yeon-soo	11; 9	14; 16	7; 11	11; 8	11; 7

Japan
3

Court E
31 October 2022

Chinese Taipei
0

			1	2	3	4	5
1	(Japan) (Chinese Taipei)	Akari Midorikawa; Lee Yi-hsuan	11; 4	11; 9	11; 7
2	(Japan) (Chinese Taipei)	Erisa Sano Herring; Wu Yi-chun	11; 2	11; 4	11; 0
3	(Japan) (Chinese Taipei)	Risa Sugimoto; Wang Yuan	11; 5	11; 6	11; 5

Malaysia
3

Court B
1 November 2022

Japan
0

			1	2	3	4	5
1	(Malaysia) (Japan)	Chan Yiwen; Erisa Sano Herring	11; 7	11; 9	11; 6
2	(Malaysia) (Japan)	Rachel Arnold; Risa Sugimoto	11; 7	11; 5	11; 8
3	(Malaysia) (Japan)	Aifa Azman; Satomi Watanabe	11; 9	11; 7	8; 11	11; 9

South Korea
3

Grand Court
1 November 2022

Chinese Taipei
0

			1	2	3	4	5
1	(South Korea) (Chinese Taipei)	Heo Min-gyeong; Wu Yi-chun	11; 1	11; 6	11; 4
2	(South Korea) (Chinese Taipei)	Choe Yu-ra; Wang Yuan	11; 2	11; 1	11; 6
3	(South Korea) (Chinese Taipei)	Eum Hwa-yeong; Lee Yi-hsuan	11; 2	11; 1	11; 5

Malaysia
3

Grand Court
2 November 2022

Chinese Taipei
0

			1	2	3	4	5
1	(Malaysia) (Chinese Taipei)	Chan Yiwen; Wang Yuan	11; 1	11; 2	11; 2
2	(Malaysia) (Chinese Taipei)	Yee Xin Ying; Chen Pin-yu	11; 2	11; 2	11; 1
3	(Malaysia) (Chinese Taipei)	Aifa Azman; Lee Yi-hsuan	11; 3	11; 3	11; 2

Japan
1

Court D
2 November 2022

South Korea
2

			1	2	3	4	5
1	(Japan) (South Korea)	Akari Midorikawa; Yang Yeon-soo	2; 11	3; 11	12; 10	10; 12
2	(Japan) (South Korea)	Risa Sugimoto; Choe Yu-ra	7; 11	11; 7	6; 11	9; 11
3	(Japan) (South Korea)	Satomi Watanabe; Eum Hwa-yeong	11; 5	11; 3	11; 3

=== Pool B ===
Pos.	Team	Players	TPd	TPt	MP	Qualification
1	Hong Kong	Ho Tze-Lok, Chan Sin Yuk, Lee Ka Yi, Tong Tsz Wing	3	3	9	Semifinals
2	India	Tanvi Khanna, Sunayna Kuruvilla, Anahat Singh, Urwashi Joshi	3	2	6	Semifinals
3	Iran	Hadis Farzad, Fereshteh Eghtedari, Ailee Nayeri, Sogol Samoodi	3	1	2	5th - 8th places
4	Singapore	Au Yeong Wai Yhann, Ong Zhe Sim, Vicky Lai, Aaliya Abo Al Thinin	3	0	1	5th - 8th places

Hong Kong
3

Court A
31 October 2022

Iran
0

			1	2	3	4	5
1	(Hong Kong) (Iran)	Ho Tze-Lok; Fereshteh Eghtedari	11; 6	11; 8	11; 5
2	(Hong Kong) (Iran)	Tong Tsz Wing; Sogol Samoodi	11; 4	11; 9	11; 2
3	(Hong Kong) (Iran)	Lee Ka Yi; Ailee Nayeri	11; 1	11; 5	11; 1

India
3

Grand Court
31 October 2022

Singapore
0

			1	2	3	4	5
1	(India) (Singapore)	Tanvi Khanna; Au Yeong Wai Yhann	11; 7	12; 10	11; 2
2	(India) (Singapore)	Anahat Singh; Aaliya Abo Al Thinin	11; 7	11; 1	11; 5
3	(India) (Singapore)	Sunayna Kuruvilla; Ong Zhe Sim	11; 7	11; 4	11; 3

Hong Kong
3

Court A
1 November 2022

India
0

			1	2	3	4	5
1	(Hong Kong) (India)	Lee Ka Yi; Anahat Singh	12; 10	13; 11	11; 9
2	(Hong Kong) (India)	Chan Sin Yuk; Sunayna Kuruvilla	12; 10	11; 5	11; 7
3	(Hong Kong) (India)	Ho Tze-Lok; Tanvi Khanna	14; 12	16; 14	11; 6

Iran
2

Court B
1 November 2022

Singapore
1

			1	2	3	4	5
1	(Iran) (Singapore)	Sogol Samoodi; Vicky Lai	11; 3	11; 0	11; 6
2	(Iran) (Singapore)	Fereshteh Eghtedari; Ong Zhe Sim	11; 6	11; 4	11; 5
3	(Iran) (Singapore)	Hadis Farzad; Au Yeong Wai Yhann	11; 8	5; 11	11; 8	9; 11	9; 11

Hong Kong
3

Court A
2 November 2022

Singapore
0

			1	2	3	4	5
1	(Hong Kong) (Singapore)	Lee Ka Yi; Vicky Lai	11; 1	11; 2	11; 2
2	(Hong Kong) (Singapore)	Tong Tsz Wing; Aaliya Abo Al Thinin	11; 4	11; 6	11; 1
3	(Hong Kong) (Singapore)	Chan Sin Yuk; Ong Zhe Sim	11; 2	11; 5	11; 0

India
3

Court B
2 November 2022

Iran
0

			1	2	3	4	5
1	(India) (Iran)	Sunayna Kuruvilla; Fereshteh Eghtedari	11; 8	10; 12	11; 5	11; 4
2	(India) (Iran)	Anahat Singh; Sogol Samoodi	11; 5	11; 5	11; 7
3	(India) (Iran)	Tanvi Khanna; Hadis Farzad	11; 6	11; 6	11; 2

== Second round ==
=== Fifth to eighth places ===
5-8 semifinals
Japan	2
Singapore	0
Chinese Taipei	0
Iran	2

Fifth place playoff
Japan	2
Iran	1
Seventh place playoff
Singapore	2
Chinese Taipei	0

==== 5th-8th semifinals ====
Japan
2

Court A
3 November 2022

Singapore
0

			1	2	3	4	5
1	(Japan) (Singapore)	Erisa Sano Herring; Aaliya Abo Al Thinin	11; 2	11; 4	11; 4
2	(Japan) (Singapore)	Satomi Watanabe; Au Yeong Wai Yhann	11; 7	11; 1	11; 3
3	(Japan) (Singapore)	Akari Midorikawa; Vicky Lai						not played

Chinese Taipei
0

Court B
3 November 2022

Iran
2

			1	2	3	4	5
1	(Chinese Taipei) (Iran)	Wu Yi-chun; Sogol Samoodi	4; 11	4; 11	1; 11
2	(Chinese Taipei) (Iran)	Lee Yi-hsuan; Hadis Farzad	8; 11	6; 11	7; 11
3	(Chinese Taipei) (Iran)	Wang Yuan; Ailee Nayeri						not played

==== 7th place playoff ====
Singapore
2

Court E
4 November 2022

Chinese Taipei
0

			1	2	3	4	5
1	(Singapore) (Chinese Taipei)	Ong Zhe Sim; Wang Yuan	11; 5	11; 6	7; 11	11; 8
2	(Singapore) (Chinese Taipei)	Au Yeong Wai Yhann; Lee Yi-hsuan	11; 5	11; 7	11; 6
3	(Singapore) (Chinese Taipei)	Aaliya Abo Al Thinin; Wu Yi-chun						not played

==== 5th place playoff ====
Japan
2

Court B
4 November 2022

Iran
1

			1	2	3	4	5
1	(Japan) (Iran)	Risa Sugimoto; Fereshteh Eghtedari	9; 11	11; 9	8; 11	4; 11
2	(Japan) (Iran)	Arisa Midorikawa; Hadis Farzad	11; 7	11; 9	7; 11	11; 5
3	(Japan) (Iran)	Erisa Sano Herring; Ailee Nayeri	8; 11	12; 10	13; 11	11; 6

=== Knockout stage ===
Semifinals
Malaysia	2
India	1
Hong Kong	2
South Korea	0

Final
Malaysia	1
Hong Kong	2

==== Semifinals ====
Malaysia
2

Grand Court
3 November 2022

India
1

			1	2	3	4	5
1	(Malaysia) (India)	Chan Yiwen; Anahat Singh	13; 11	8; 11	8; 11	4; 11
2	(Malaysia) (India)	Aifa Azman; Tanvi Khanna	11; 8	11; 4	11; 5
3	(Malaysia) (India)	Rachel Arnold; Sunayna Kuruvilla	11; 7	10; 12	11; 6	11; 4

Hong Kong
2

Court D
3 November 2022

South Korea
0

			1	2	3	4	5
1	(Hong Kong) (South Korea)	Lee Ka Yi; Heo Min-gyeong	11; 6	11; 9	11; 3
2	(Hong Kong) (South Korea)	Ho Tze-Lok; Eum Hwa-yeong	8; 11	11; 5	11; 8	11; 3
3	(Hong Kong) (South Korea)	Chan Sin Yuk; Choe Yu-ra						not played

==== Final ====
Malaysia
1

Grand Court
4 November 2022

Hong Kong
2

			1	2	3	4	5
1	(Malaysia) (Hong Kong)	Rachel Arnold; Chan Sin Yuk	11; 8	5; 11	6; 11	9; 11
2	(Malaysia) (Hong Kong)	Aifa Azman; Ho Tze-Lok	11; 5	7; 11	9; 11	11; 8	12; 10
3	(Malaysia) (Hong Kong)	Yee Xin Ying; Lee Ka Yi	8; 11	5; 11	5; 11

== Final rankings ==
Position	Team
1st place, gold medalist(s)	Hong Kong
2nd place, silver medalist(s)	Malaysia
3rd place, bronze medalist(s)	India
3rd place, bronze medalist(s)	South Korea
5th	Japan
6th	Iran
7th	Singapore
8th	Chinese Taipei

Draws:

Matches:

Players:

Result:

== See also ==
- Asian Team Squash Championships
- 2022 Men's Asian Squash Team Championships

Preceded by Kuala Lumpur; 2021	Asian Team Squash Championships; Cheongju (South Korea); 2022	Succeeded by 2024
