= Squash at the 2026 Asian Games =

- Venue: Kinjo-Futo Arena
- Dates: 23 September – 2 October 2026
- Competitors: 109 from 22 nations

The squash competitions at the 2026 Asian Games was held between 23 September and 2 October 2026 at the Takeda Teva Ocean Arena.

The winner of the men's singles and women's singles events qualified for the 2028 Summer Olympics in Los Angeles, United States.

== Schedule ==
P	Preliminary rounds	¼	Quarterfinals	½	Semifinals	F	Final

Event↓/Date →	23rd Wed	24th Thu	25th Fri	26th Sat	27th Sun	28th Mon	29th Tue	30th Wed		1st Thu	2nd Fri
Men's singles	P	P	¼	½	F						
Men's team						P	P	¼		½	F
Women's singles	P	P	¼	½	F						
Women's team						P	P	P	¼	½	F
Mixed doubles	P	P	¼	½	F						

== Medalists ==
Event	Gold	Silver	Bronze
Men's singles	Ng Eain Yow; Malaysia	Abhay Singh; India	Noor Zaman; Pakistan
Men's singles	Ng Eain Yow; Malaysia	Abhay Singh; India	Muhammad Ashab Irfan; Pakistan
Men's team	Malaysia; Ameeshenraj Chandaran; Sanjay Jeeva; Mohd Syafiq Kamal; Ng Eain Yow	Pakistan; Nasir Iqbal; Muhammad Ashab Irfan; Asim Khan; Noor Zaman	India; Suraj Chand; Veer Chotrani; Velavan Senthilkumar; Abhay Singh
Men's team	Malaysia; Ameeshenraj Chandaran; Sanjay Jeeva; Mohd Syafiq Kamal; Ng Eain Yow	Pakistan; Nasir Iqbal; Muhammad Ashab Irfan; Asim Khan; Noor Zaman	Hong Kong; Matthew Lai; Lau Tsz Kwan; Henry Leung; Tang Ming Hong
Women's singles	Sivasangari Subramaniam; Malaysia	Anahat Singh; India	Satomi Watanabe; Japan
Women's singles	Sivasangari Subramaniam; Malaysia	Anahat Singh; India	Chan Sin Yuk; Hong Kong
Women's team	Malaysia; Rachel Arnold; Aifa Azman; Aira Azman; Sivasangari Subramaniam	Hong Kong; Chan Sin Yuk; Ho Tze Lok; Lee Ka Yi; Toby Tse	Japan; Akari Midorikawa; Erisa Sano; Risa Sugimoto; Satomi Watanabe
Women's team	Malaysia; Rachel Arnold; Aifa Azman; Aira Azman; Sivasangari Subramaniam	Hong Kong; Chan Sin Yuk; Ho Tze Lok; Lee Ka Yi; Toby Tse	India; Joshna Chinappa; Tanvi Khanna; Shameena Riaz; Anahat Singh
Mixed doubles	Hong Kong; Tang Ming Hong; Lee Ka Yi	Hong Kong; Matthew Lai; Toby Tse	India; Velavan Senthilkumar; Joshna Chinappa
Mixed doubles	Hong Kong; Tang Ming Hong; Lee Ka Yi	Hong Kong; Matthew Lai; Toby Tse	Malaysia; Ameeshenraj Chandaran; Rachel Arnold

== Medal table ==
Rank	Nation	Gold	Silver	Bronze	Total
1	Malaysia (MAS)	4	0	1	5
2	Hong Kong (HKG)	1	2	2	5
3	India (IND)	0	2	3	5
4	Pakistan (PAK)	0	1	2	3
5	Japan (JPN)	0	0	2	2
Totals (5 entries)		5	5	10	20

== Participating nations ==
A total of 109 athletes from 22 nations competed in squash at the 2026 Asian Games:

- China (8)
- Hong Kong (8)
- India (8)
- Indonesia (2)
- Iran (4)
- Japan (8)
- Jordan (1)
- Kuwait (4)
- Lebanon (1)
- Macau (4)
- Malaysia (8)
- Mongolia (8)
- Nepal (2)
- Pakistan (8)
- Philippines (6)
- Qatar (4)
- Saudi Arabia (1)
- Singapore (5)
- South Korea (8)
- Sri Lanka (3)
- Thailand (4)
- Uzbekistan (4)
