= Anahat Singh =

Indian squash player (born 2008)

Personal information
- Born: 13 March 2008 (age 18) New Delhi, India
- Education: The British School, New Delhi
- Height: 1.65 m (5 ft 5 in)

Sport
- Country: India
- Handedness: Right-handed
- Turned pro: 2023
- Coached by: Stéphane Galifi; Grégory Gaultier; Saurav Ghosal
- Racquet used: Dunlop

Women's singles
- Highest ranking: 17 (September 2026)
- Current ranking: 17 (September 2026)
- Title: 16
- Tour final: 18
- PSA Profile
Medal record
Women's squash
Representing India
Event	1st	2nd	3rd
World Cup	1	0	0
Asian Games	0	1	3
Asian Championships	2	0	2
World Junior Championships	1	0	1
Asian Junior Championships	3	0	3
Total	7	1	9
World Cup
Gold medal – first place	2025 Chennai	Mixed team
Asian Games
Silver medal – second place	2026 Aichi–Nagoya	Singles
Bronze medal – third place	2022 Hangzhou	Mixed doubles
Bronze medal – third place	2022 Hangzhou	Team
Bronze medal – third place	2026 AIchi-Nagoya	Team
Asian Championships
Gold medal – first place	2025 Kuala Lumpur	Mixed doubles
Gold medal – first place	2025 Kuala Lumpur	Doubles
Bronze medal – third place	2022 Cheongju	Team
Bronze medal – third place	2023 Hangzhou	Mixed doubles
World Junior Championships
Gold medal – first place	2026 Niagara	Singles
Bronze medal – third place	2025 Cairo	Singles
Asian Junior Championships
Gold medal – first place	2022 Na Chom Thian	Singles
Gold medal – first place	2023 Dalian	Singles
Gold medal – first place	2025 Gimcheon	Singles
Bronze medal – third place	2019 Macau	Singles
Bronze medal – third place	2023 Chennai	Team
Bronze medal – third place	2025 Hong Kong	Team

Anahat Singh (born 13 March 2008) is an Indian squash player. She holds several age related records. She is the youngest to represent India at the Commonwealth Games and the World Squash Junior Championships, and the youngest from Asia to be ranked in the top 20 in the Women's Squash World Rankings.

Singh was part of the team that won the gold medal in the mixed team event at the 2025 Squash World Cup at Chennai. She has won a silver and three bronze medals at the Asian Games, two gold and bronze medals each at the Asian Championships, and titles at the World and Asian Junior Championships.

== Early life ==
Anahat Singh was born in New Delhi on 13 March 2008 to Tani Vadehra and Gursharan Singh. Her mother is an interior designer and her father is a lawyer, and both used to play field hockey earlier. As a five year old, Singh began playing badminton after being inspired by P. V. Sindhu. She used to accompany her sister Amira, who played squash. Later she tried her hand at squash and played a few tournaments where she performed well. As she grew fond of it, she took up the sport professionally.

== Career ==
=== 2019–2023 ===
Singh first rose to prominence after winning the under-11 title at the British Junior Open in 2019. She later won the Dutch Junior Open in the same year. She won the under-15 title at the 2022 Asian Junior Championships. At the age of 14, she became the youngest to represent India at the Commonwealth Games after taking part at the 2022 Commonwealth Games at Birmingham.

In January 2023, Singh won the under-15 title at the British Junior Open beating Egypt's Sohaila Hazem. In August, she won the under-17 title at the Asian Junior Championships in Dalian. She won two bronze medals at the 2022 Asian Games in Hangzhou. She partnered with Abhay Singh in the mixed doubles event and was part of the women's team event. She was briefly the youngest Indian to win a medal at the Asian Games. In November, she became the youngest to win the senior national championship after Tanvi Khanna retired in the finals due to an injury. She ended the year by winning the under-19 title at the Scottish Junior Open after defeating Robyn McAlpine in the final.

=== 2024 ===
In January 2024, Singh finished as a runner-up in the under-17 event at the British Junior Open after losing to Egypt's Nadien Elhammamy in the finals. In the same month, she won her first Professional Squash Association (PSA) tour title at the JSW Willingdon Little Masters & Senior Tournament in Mumbai defeating Japan's Erisa Sano Herring in straight sets. She won the Hamdard Squashters Northern Slam in April after defeating South Korea's Hwayeong Eum in the final, and the HCL Squash Tour Chennai in June after defeating compatriot Rathika Seelan. By the end of the year, she had won nine titles out of the ten competitions she competed in the PSA tour with a 38–2 win record. She became the first woman to win nine titles in a year since Nicol David in 2010. At the age of 16, she broke into the top 100 of the Women's Squash World Rankings for the first time, after jumping 51 places to be ranked 82nd. She was later featured in the PSA's list of players to watch out for.

=== 2025 ===
In January 2025, Singh won her third title at the British Junior Open after defeating Malika Elkaraksy in the final. At the 2025 Asian Junior Team Championships at Hongkong, the Indian team won the bronze medal. Singh won all her matches in the tournament without losing a set. In March, she won the SRFI Indian Tour defeating compatriot Akanksha Salunkhe in the final, and the Indian Open after defeating Helen Tang of Hong Kong in the final, which enabled her to reach a career-high ranking of 62nd by the end of the month. In the Asia qualifiers for the World Squash Championships, she defeated Hong Kong's Toby Tse to qualify for her first World Championships. She bceame the youngest Indian to take part in the World Championships, when she defeated world number 28 Marina Stefanoni of the United States in the first round of the 2025 World Championships. In the second round, she lost to then world number 15, Fayrouz Aboelkheir of Egypt, by a score of 1–3.

At the British Open qualifiers, Singh defeated the higher ranked Marie Stephan of France to enter the main draw, thereby becoming the youngest to take part at the tournament since Nour El Sherbini in 2012. She won the first round against Scotland's Lisa Aitken before losing to world number nine Sivasangari Subramaniam of Malaysia in the second round. In June 2025, she was awareded the PSA Young Player of the Year and Challenger Player of the Year at the PSA Awards for the 2024–25 season. At the 2025 Asian Doubles Championships at Kuala Lumpur, she won the gold medal in the women's doubles and mixed doubles events partnering Joshna Chinappa and Abhay Singh respectively. She won the under-19 title at the 2025 Asian Junior Individual Championship in July 2025.

Singh was seeded second at the 2025 World Junior Championships. She became the first Indian woman to reach the semi-finals of the event in 15 years, and later won the bronze medal after losing to Nadien Elhammamy in the semi-finals. In August 2025, she retired during the final match of the 2025 Bega Open due to an ankle injury. At the Canadian Open, her first silver tour event, she defeated world no. 20 Mélissa Alves to reach the quarterfinals, and later defeated world no. seven Tinne Gilis to enter the semi-finals. At the 2025 Indian Open, she defeated compatriot Joshna Chinappa in five sets to win the title, which propelled her to 29th in the World Rankings. She was awareded the Certificate of Excellence and included in the World Book of Records for her squash achievements. At the HCL Squash Tour Chennai, she won her fourth title of the season, after defeating Joshna Chinappa in the final. In December 2025, she was part of the India team that won its first ever title at the Squash World Cup in Chennai.

=== 2026 ===
Top-seeded Singh finished runner-up at the British Junior Open after losing to Lauren Baltayan in the final. She won the Squash on Fire Open in February 2026, and defended her Indian Open title in April 2026. Later in the month, she became the youngest Asian to break into the top 20 in the World Rankings, breaking the previous record held by Nicol David. In July, she became the country's first World Junior champion after defeating Egypt's Ruqayya Salem at the 2026 World Junior Championships in the final and becoming the first non-Egyptian player to win the championships since Amanda Sobhy in 2010. After the win, she became the number one ranked junior player in the world. In the 2026 World Junior Team Championships, the women's team lost to the United States in the quarter-finals.

At the 2026 London Squash Classic, Singh defeated world No. 11 Nele Gilis to reach the quarter-finals, where she lost to world No. 5 Sivasangari Subramaniam. She was part of the Indian squad for the 2026 Asian Games. She won the silver medal in the women's singles event after losing to Subramaniam in the finals. The Indian team, consisting of Singh, won the bronze medal in the women's team event.

== Coaches ==
During Singh's early career, she was trained at the Siri Fort Sports Complex in Delhi by Amjad Khan and Ashraf Hussain. She was later coached by Ritwick Bhattacharya, and Dharmender Wenwal. Since 2023, she is coached by Stéphane Galifi and Grégory Gaultier. Saurav Ghosal joined her coaching team in 2024, and mentors her.

== Tournaments ==
=== Senior ===
Year	Tournament	Venue	Category	Result	Ref
2022	Asian Games	(China) Hangzhou	Team	3rd	
2022	Asian Games	(China) Hangzhou	Mixed Doubles	3rd	
2022	Asian Championships	(South Korea) Cheongju	Team	3rd	
2023	Asian Championships	(China) Hangzhou	Mixed Doubles	3rd	
2024	World Championships	Hong Kong Island	Team	7th	
2025	World Championships	(United States) Chicago	Singles	R32	
2025	Asian Championships	(Malaysia) Kuala Lumpur	Doubles	1st	
2025	Asian Championships	(Malaysia) Kuala Lumpur	Mixed Doubles	1st	
2025	World Cup	(India) Chennai	Mixed Team	1st	

=== Junior ===
Year	Tournament	Venue	Category	Result	Ref
2019	Asian Championships	Macau	Singles	3rd	
2022	Asian Championships	(Thailand) Na Chom Thian	Singles	1st	
2022	World Championships	(France) Maxéville	Singles	QF	
2023	Asian Championships	(India) Chennai	Team	3rd	
2023	World Championships	(Australia) Melbourne	Singles	QF	
2023	World Championships	(Australia) Melbourne	Team	8th	
2023	Asian Championships	(China) Dalian	Singles	1st	
2024	World Championships	(United States) Houston	Singles	QF	
2024	World Championships	(United States) Houston	Team	7th	
2025	Asian Championships	(Hong Kong) Tsim Sha Tsui	Team	3rd	
2025	Asian Championships	(South Korea) Gimcheon	Singles	1st	
2025	World Championships	(Egypt) Cairo	Singles	3rd	
2025	World Championships	(Egypt) Cairo	Team	6th	
2026	World Championships	(Canada) Niagara	Singles	1st	
2026	World Championships	(Canada) Niagara	Team	QF	

== World Tour ==
=== Senior ===
Year	Tournament	Opponent	Result	Score	Ref.
2024	JSW Willingdon LMS	(Japan) Erisa Sano Herring	Win	3–0 (11–4, 11–3, 11–7)	
2024	Hamdard Squashters Northern Slam	(South Korea) Hwayeong Eum	Win	3–0 (11–6, 11–4, 11–5)	
2024	HCL Squash Tour Chennai	(India) Rathika Seelan	Win	3–0 (11–5, 11–3, 11–3)	
2024	Dynam Cup SQ-Cube Open	(Egypt) Ruqayya Salem	W/O	N/A	
2024	Reliance PSA Challenge 3	(Sri Lanka) Chanithma Sinaly	Win	3–0 (11–0, 11–1, 11–4)	
2024	HCL Squash Tour Kolkata	(Philippines) Jemyca Aribado	Win	3–0 (11–5, 11–3, 11–7)	
2024	Costa North Coast Open	(Japan) Akari Midorikawa	Win	3–0 (11–6, 11–6, 11–7)	
2024	NSW Open	(Hong Kong) Helen Tang	Win	3–1 (8–11, 11–6, 11–3, 11–4)	
2024	Sunil Verma Memorial	(India) Shameena Riaz	Win	3–0 (11–4, 11–3, 11–1)	
2024	Western India Slam	(India) Akanksha Salunkhe	Win	3–0 (11–8, 11–8, 11–8)	
2025	SRFI Indian Tour	(India) Akanksha Salunkhe	Win	3–1 (11–6, 8–11, 11–8, 11–5)	
2025	JSW Indian Open	(Hong Kong) Helen Tang	Win	3–0 (11–9, 11–5, 11–8)	
2025	NSW Bega Open	(Egypt) Habiba Hani	Loss	1–3 (11–9, 5–11, 8–11, 4–10)	
2025	SRFI Indian Open	(India) Joshna Chinappa	Win	3–2 (11–8, 11–13, 11–9, 6–11, 11–9)	
2025	HCL Squash Tour Chennai	(India) Joshna Chinappa	Win	3–2 (11–8, 11–13, 11–13, 11–6, 11–8	
2026	Squash on Fire Open	(England) Georgina Kennedy	Win	3–0 (12–10, 11–5, 11–7)	
2026	JSW Indian Open	(Egypt) Hana Moataz	Win	3–1 (11–5, 11–6, 9–11, 11–6)	

=== Junior ===
Year	Tournament	Opponent	Result	Score	Ref.
2019	British Junior Open	(Malaysia) Whitney Wilson	Win	3–1 (13–11, 11–9, 7–11, 11–9)	
2019	European Junior Open	(United States) Avery Park	Win	3–0 (11–7, 11–3, 11–4)	
2019	Dutch Junior Open	(France) Lauren Baltayan	Win	3–2 (11–6, 11–7, 9–11, 7–11, 11–8)	
2019	Scottish Junior Open	(Malaysia) Keertty Haridharan	Win	3–0 (11–1, 11–1, 11–1)	
2020	British Junior Open	(Egypt) Amina Orfi	Loss	0–3 (11–0, 11–1, 11–4)	
2021	US Junior Open	(Egypt) Jayda Marei	Win	3–1 (11–9 11–5 8–11 11–5)	
2022	German Junior Open	(Egypt) Malak Samir	Win	3–0 (11–1, 11–4, 11–5)	
2022	Dutch Junior Open	(Egypt) Malak Samir	Win	3–0 (11–4 11–7 11–2)	
2023	British Junior Open	(Egypt) Sohaila Hazem	Win	3–1 (11–8, 8–11, 11–7, 11–5)	
2023	Scottish Junior Open	(Scotland) Robyn McAlpine	Win	3–0 (11–6, 11–1, 11–5)	
2024	British Junior Open	(Egypt) Nadien Elhammamy	Loss	2–3 (7–11, 13–11, 12–10, 5–11, 11–9)	
2025	British Junior Open	(Egypt) Malika Elkaraksy	Win	3–2 (4–11, 11–9, 6–11, 11–5, 11–3)	
2026	British Junior Open	(France) Lauren Baltayan	Loss	1–3 (9–11, 11–7, 3–11, 9–11)	

== Awards and nominations ==
Year	Award	Category	Result	Ref
2023	Times of India Sports Awards	Special Recognition in Squash	Won	
2023	Times of India Sports Awards	Emerging Sportsperson of the Year	Nominated	
2024	PSA Awards	Challenger Player of January	Won	
2024	PSA Awards	Challenger Player of August	Won	
2024	Indian Sports Honours	Sportswoman of the Year	Nominated	
2025	Times of India Sports Awards	Squash Player of the Year Female	Won	
2025	PSA Awards	Challenger Player of January	Won	
2025	ASF Awards	Outstanding Performance Junior Women	Won	
2025	PSA Awards	Young Player of the Year	Won	
2025	PSA Awards	Challenger Player of the Year	Won	
2025	ASF Awards	Girls' Player of the Year	Won	
2026	PSA Awards	Player of the Month January	Won	

== See also ==
- Squash in India
- India women's national squash team
