= Squash at the 2026 Asian Games – Women's singles =

Women's singles at the 2026 Asian Games
- Venue: Kinjo-Futo Arena
- Dates: 23–27 September 2026
- Competitors: 27 from 15 nations

Medalists
gold medal	Sivasangari Subramaniam	Malaysia
silver medal	Anahat Singh	India
bronze medal	Satomi Watanabe	Japan
bronze medal	Chan Sin Yuk	Hong Kong

The women's singles squash event was part of the squash programme and took place between 23 September and 27 September 2026, at Nagoya Kinjo-Futo Arena.

== Schedule ==
All times are Japan Standard Time (UTC+09:00)

Date	Time	Event
Wednesday, 23 September 2026	14:45	Round of 32
Thursday, 24 September 2026	14:00	Round of 16
Friday, 25 September 2026	12:00	Quarterfinals
Saturday, 26 September 2026	14:00	Semifinals
Sunday, 27 September 2026	12:00	Finals

== Results ==
=== Finals ===
Semifinals
1	Sivasangari Subramaniam (MAS)	11	11	11
5	Chan Sin Yuk (HKG)	6	8	7
3	Anahat Singh (IND)	9	11	12	11	11
2	Satomi Watanabe (JPN)	11	13	10	6	3

Gold medal match
1	Sivasangari Subramaniam (MAS)	11	11	11
3	Anahat Singh (IND)	4	4	7
3/4 play off
5	Chan Sin Yuk (HKG)	3	6	11	9
2	Satomi Watanabe (JPN)	11	11	7	11

=== Top half ===
==== Section 1 ====
Round of 32
Liu Ziyi (CHN)	9	11	11	4	4
14	Chanithma Sinaly (SRI)	11	6	3	11	11
15	Fereshteh Eghtedari (IRI)	11	11	11
Altankhuyagiin Ariunbileg (MGL)	0	4	1
Yin Ziyuan (CHN)	7	2	6
6	Ho Tze Lok (HKG)	11	11	11

Round of 16
1	Sivasangari Subramaniam (MAS)	11	11	11
14	Chanithma Sinaly (SRI)	3	5	3
15	Fereshteh Eghtedari (IRI)	6	5	5
6	Ho Tze Lok (HKG)	11	11	11

Quarterfinals
1	Sivasangari Subramaniam (MAS)	11	11	11
6	Ho Tze Lok (HKG)	8	7	8

==== Section 2 ====
Round of 32							Round of 16					Quarterfinals
							5	Chan Sin Yuk (HKG)	11	11	11
	Mannona Mamadjanova (UZB)	2	1	8			11	Ryoo Bo-ram (KOR)	8	4	4
11	Ryoo Bo-ram (KOR)	11	11	11								5	Chan Sin Yuk (HKG)	10	11	11	11
12	Sana Bahadar (PAK)	9	11	12	8	6						4	Aira Azman (MAS)	12	9	5	9
	Najmeh Boushehrizadeh (IRI)	11	6	10	11	11		Najmeh Boushehrizadeh (IRI)	2	2	10
							4	Aira Azman (MAS)	11	11	12

=== Bottom half ===
==== Section 3 ====
Round of 32
Anna Ugay (UZB)	0	1	2
13	Au Yeong Wai Lynn (SGP)	11	11	11
9	Au Yeong Wai Yhann (SGP)	11	11	11
Mahnoor Ali (PAK)	9	3	8
Kim Da-mi (KOR)	5	7	5
7	Tanvi Khanna (IND)	11	11	11

Round of 16
3	Anahat Singh (IND)	11	11	11
13	Au Yeong Wai Lynn (SGP)	4	5	7
9	Au Yeong Wai Yhann (SGP)	11	4	5	11
7	Tanvi Khanna (IND)	5	11	11	13

Quarterfinals
3	Anahat Singh (IND)	11	11	11
7	Tanvi Khanna (IND)	2	5	3

==== Section 4 ====
Round of 32
8	Akari Midorikawa (JPN)	11	11	11
Yeung Wai Leng (MAC)	7	4	7
Bat-Erdeniin Khongorzul (MGL)	1	1	1
16	Anantana Prasertratanakul (THA)	11	11	11
10	Yeung Weng Chi (MAC)	9	11	6	11	11
Raifa Putri Yattaqi (INA)	11	6	11	6	8

Round of 16
8	Akari Midorikawa (JPN)	11	11	11
16	Anantana Prasertratanakul (THA)	2	7	5
10	Yeung Weng Chi (MAC)	5	9	8
2	Satomi Watanabe (JPN)	11	11	11

Quarterfinals
8	Akari Midorikawa (JPN)	5	2	6
2	Satomi Watanabe (JPN)	11	11	11
