= Asian Doubles Squash Championships =

Asian doubles squash competition

Details
- Event name: Asian Championship
- Website; Asian Squash

Winners
- Men's: (India) Abhay Singh; Velavan Senthilkumar
- Women's: (India) Anahat Singh; Joshna Chinappa
- Mixed: (India) Anahat Singh; Abhay Singh

Asian Doubles Squash Championships are championships hosted every year to test which Asian doubles squash players reign supreme in the men's, women's and mixed doubles categories. The tournament is organised by Asian Squash Federation.

== Editions ==
1. 2023 Hangzhou China
2. 2024 Johor Malaysia
3. 2025 Kuala Lumpur Malaysia
4. 2026 Kuching Malaysia

== Medal table ==
Rank	Nation	Gold	Silver	Bronze	Total
1	India (IND)	7	0	2	9
2	Malaysia (MAS)	1	5	3	9
3	Pakistan (PAK)	0	2	0	2
4	Hong Kong (HKG)	0	1	5	6
5	Japan (JPN)	0	0	1	1
Totals (5 entries)		8	8	11	27

== Editions and results ==
=== Mixed doubles ===
Year	Host	Winners	Second place	Third Place	Ref
2023	Hangzhou (China)	(India) Dipika Pallikal Harinder Pal Sandhu	(Malaysia) Rachel Arnold; Ivan Yuen	(India) Anahat Singh; Abhay Singh	
2024	Johor (Malaysia)	(India) Joshna Chinappa Abhay Singh	(Hong Kong) Tong Tsz Wing; Tang Ming Hong	(Hong Kong) Cheng Nga Ching; Matthew Lai (Malaysia) Ainaa Amani; Addeen Idrakie	
2025	Kuala Lumpur (Malaysia)	(India) Anahat Singh Abhay Singh	(Malaysia) Rachel Arnold; Ameeshenraj Chandaran	(India) Joshna Chinappa; Velavan Senthilkumar	

=== Men's doubles ===
Year	Host	Winners	Second place	Third Place	Ref
2024	Johor (Malaysia)	(India) Abhay Singh Velavan Senthilkumar	(Malaysia) Ong Sai Hung; Mohd Syafiq Kamal	(Hong Kong) Lau Tsz Kwan; Leo Chung (Japan) Tomotaka Endo; Naoki Hayashi	
2025	Kuala Lumpur (Malaysia)	(India) Abhay Singh Velavan Senthilkumar	(Pakistan) Noor Zaman; Nasir Iqbal	(Malaysia) Mohd Syafiq Kamal; Duncan Lee	
2026	Kuching (Malaysia)	(India) Abhay Singh Velavan Senthilkumar	(Pakistan) Noor Zaman; Nasir Iqbal	(Malaysia) Sanjay Jeeva; Duncan Lee	

=== Women's doubles ===
Year	Host	Winners	Second place	Third Place	Ref
2024	Johor (Malaysia)	(Malaysia) Aifa Azman Aira Azman	(Malaysia) Ainaa Amani; Chan Yiwen	(Hong Kong) Ho Tze Lok; Heylie Fung (Hong Kong) Toby Tse; Kirstie Wong	
2025	Kuala Lumpur (Malaysia)	(India) Anahat Singh Joshna Chinappa	(Malaysia) Ainaa Amani; Yee Xin Ying	(Hong Kong) Toby Tse; Kirstie Wong	

== See also ==
- Squash
- Asian Squash Federation
- Asian Individual Squash Championships
- Asian Team Squash Championships
- World Squash Championships
