= Squash at the 2022 Asian Games – Women's team =

Women's team at the 2022 Asian Games
- Venue: Hangzhou Olympic Expo Squash Court
- Dates: 26–30 September 2023
- Competitors: 38 from 10 nations

Medalists
gold medal	Malaysia; Rachel Arnold, Aifa Azman, Aira Azman, Sivasangari Subramaniam
silver medal	Hong Kong; Chan Sin Yuk, Ho Tze Lok, Lee Ka Yi, Tong Tsz Wing
bronze medal	India; Joshna Chinappa, Tanvi Khanna, Dipika Pallikal, Anahat Singh
bronze medal	South Korea; Eum Hwa-yeong, Heo Min-gyeong, Lee Ji-hyun, Yang Yeon-soo

The Women's team squash event was part of the squash programme and took place between 26 September and 30 September 2023, at the Hangzhou Olympic Sports Center.

== Schedule ==
All times are China Standard Time (UTC+08:00)

Date	Time	Event
Tuesday, 26 September 2023	10:00	Preliminary round
Wednesday, 27 September 2023	10:00	Preliminary round
Thursday, 28 September 2023	12:30	Preliminary round
Friday, 29 September 2023	11:00	Semifinals
Saturday, 30 September 2023	13:00	Gold medal match

== Results ==
=== Preliminary round ===
==== Pool A ====
Pos	Team	Pld	W	L	MF	MA	Qualification
1	Hong Kong	4	4	0	11	1	Semifinals
2	South Korea	4	3	1	8	4	Semifinals
3	Japan	4	2	2	8	4	
4	Thailand	4	1	3	3	9	
5	Mongolia	4	0	4	0	12	

Source: OCA

26 September	Japan	3–0	Thailand

Akari Midorikawa	3–0	Arichaya Chujit	11–3, 11–5, 11–8
Satomi Watanabe	3–0	Anantana Prasertratanakul	11–1, 11–0, 11–2
Risa Sugimoto	3–0	Supakorn Ngamprasert	11–4, 11–3, 11–2

26 September	Hong Kong	3–0	Mongolia

Tong Tsz Wing	3–0	Bat-Altansükhiin Uranmandakh	11–1, 11–2, 11–2
Ho Tze Lok	3–0	Altankhuyagiin Ariunbileg	11–3, 11–4, 11–2
Chan Sin Yuk	3–0	Amarmendiin Uyanga	11–2, 11–1, 11–1

26 September	South Korea	3–0	Mongolia

Yang Yeon-soo	3–0	Bat-Altansükhiin Uranmandakh	11–3, 11–1, 11–6
Lee Ji-hyun	3–0	Altankhuyagiin Ariunbileg	11–1, 11–1, Retired
Eum Hwa-yeong	3–0	Amarmendiin Uyanga	11–2, 11–3, 11–0

26 September	Hong Kong	3–0	Thailand

Lee Ka Yi	3–0	Waritsara Chujit	11–2, 11–5, 11–3
Ho Tze Lok	3–0	Supakorn Ngamprasert	11–4, 11–1, 11–3
Chan Sin Yuk	3–0	Arichaya Chujit	11–3, 11–1, 11–2

27 September	Hong Kong	3–0	South Korea

Tong Tsz Wing	3–0	Lee Ji-hyun	11–3, 11–7, 11–5
Chan Sin Yuk	3–0	Heo Min-gyeong	11–4, 11–8, 11–6
Lee Ka Yi	3–0	Eum Hwa-yeong	11–6, 11–6, 11–7

27 September	Japan	3–0	Mongolia

Risa Sugimoto	3–0	Bat-Altansükhiin Uranmandakh	11–2, 11–1, 11–1
Satomi Watanabe	3–0	Amarmendiin Uyanga	11–1, 11–2, 11–3
Akari Midorikawa	3–0	Pürevjavyn Khulan	11–1, 11–1, 11–0

27 September	Hong Kong	2–1	Japan

Chan Sin Yuk	3–0	Risa Sugimoto	11–4, 11–5, 11–0
Ho Tze Lok	0–3	Satomi Watanabe	7–11, 7–11, 6–11
Lee Ka Yi	3–0	Akari Midorikawa	11–3, 11–8, 11–7

27 September	South Korea	3–0	Thailand

Lee Ji-hyun	3–0	Arichaya Chujit	11–3, 11–2, 11–2
Heo Min-gyeong	3–1	Anantana Prasertratanakul	11–6, 11–2, 9–11, 11–9
Yang Yeon-soo	3–0	Waritsara Chujit	11–3, 11–1, 11–4

28 September	Thailand	3–0	Mongolia

Anantana Prasertratanakul	3–0	Amarmendiin Uyanga	11–1, 11–6, 11–2
Supakorn Ngamprasert	3–0	Bat-Altansükhiin Uranmandakh	11–6, 11–3, 11–1
Arichaya Chujit	3–0	Pürevjavyn Khulan	11–1, 11–3, 11–2

28 September	Japan	1–2	South Korea

Satomi Watanabe	3–0	Heo Min-gyeong	11–4, 11–2, 11–2
Risa Sugimoto	0–3	Eum Hwa-yeong	7–11, 4–11, 3–11
Akari Midorikawa	1–3	Yang Yeon-soo	5–11, 11–6, 10–12, 6–11

==== Pool B ====
Pos	Team	Pld	W	L	MF	MA	Qualification
1	Malaysia	4	4	0	12	0	Semifinals
2	India	4	3	1	9	3	Semifinals
3	Macau	4	2	2	5	7	
4	Pakistan	4	1	3	4	8	
5	Nepal	4	0	4	0	12	

Source: OCA

26 September	India	3–0	Pakistan

Anahat Singh	3–0	Sadia Gul	11–6, 11–6, 11–3
Joshna Chinappa	3–0	Noor-ul-Huda Sadiq	11–2, 11–5, 11–7
Tanvi Khanna	3–0	Noor-ul-Ain Ijaz	11–3, 11–6, 11–2

26 September	Malaysia	3–0	Nepal

Aira Azman	3–0	Swasthani Shrestha	11–3, 11–1, 11–6
Aifa Azman	3–0	Bipana Bhlon	11–2, 11–5, 11–6
Rachel Arnold	3–0	Krishna Thapa	11–4, 11–5, 11–4

26 September	Malaysia	3–0	Pakistan

Aira Azman	3–0	Mehwish Ali	11–5, 11–6, 11–3
Sivasangari Subramaniam	3–0	Noor-ul-Huda Sadiq	11–2, 11–6, 11–5
Rachel Arnold	3–0	Noor-ul-Ain Ijaz	11–0, 11–3, 11–3

26 September	Macau	3–0	Nepal

Leong Ieng Lam	3–0	Swasthani Shrestha	11–6, 11–9, 11–4
Yeung Weng Chi	3–0	Bipana Bhlon	11–3, 11–4, 11–4
Yeung Wai Leng	3–0	Krishna Thapa	11–6, 11–5, 11–0

27 September	Malaysia	3–0	Macau

Aifa Azman	3–0	Yeung Wai Leng	11–1, 11–2, 11–3
Sivasangari Subramaniam	3–0	Liu Kwai Chi	11–6, 11–2, 11–2
Aira Azman	3–0	Leong Ieng Lam	11–7, 11–2, 11–2

27 September	India	3–0	Nepal

Anahat Singh	3–0	Krishna Thapa	11–7, 11–1, 11–2
Joshna Chinappa	3–0	Bipana Bhlon	11–4, 11–2, 11–2
Dipika Pallikal	3–0	Swasthani Shrestha	11–1, 11–3, 11–2

27 September	India	3–0	Macau

Tanvi Khanna	3–1	Yeung Weng Chi	11–8, 5–11, 11–9, 11–7
Joshna Chinappa	3–0	Liu Kwai Chi	11–3, 11–7, 12–10
Anahat Singh	3–0	Yeung Wai Leng	11–1, 11–7, 11–6

27 September	Pakistan	3–0	Nepal

Noor-ul-Ain Ijaz	3–1	Krishna Thapa	11–9, 11–8, 8–11, 11–8
Noor-ul-Huda Sadiq	3–0	Bipana Bhlon	11–5, 11–9, 11–9
Mehwish Ali	3–0	Swasthani Shrestha	11–8, 12–10, 11–6

28 September	Malaysia	3–0	India

Sivasangari Subramaniam	3–0	Joshna Chinappa	11–6, 11–2, 11–8
Aifa Azman	3–2	Tanvi Khanna	9–11, 11–1, 7–11, 13–11, 11–5
Rachel Arnold	3–0	Anahat Singh	11–7, 11–7, 14–12

28 September	Macau	2–1	Pakistan

Liu Kwai Chi	3–1	Noor-ul-Huda Sadiq	10–12, 11–7, 11–5, 11–8
Yeung Weng Chi	3–0	Noor-ul-Ain Ijaz	11–5, 11–5, 11–3
Yeung Wai Leng	2–3	Mehwish Ali	12–10, 11–8, 9–11, 2–11, 7–11

=== Knockout round ===
Semifinals			Gold medal match
A1	Hong Kong	2
B2	India	1	A1	Hong Kong	1
B1	Malaysia	2	B1	Malaysia	2
A2	South Korea	0

==== Semifinals ====
29 September	Hong Kong	2–1	India

Chan Sin Yuk	3–0	Tanvi Khanna	11–6, 11–7, 11–3
Ho Tze Lok	2–3	Joshna Chinappa	11–7, 7–11, 11–9, 6–11, 8–11
Lee Ka Yi	3–0	Anahat Singh	11–8, 11–7, 12–10

29 September	Malaysia	2–0	South Korea

Aifa Azman	3–0	Eum Hwa-yeong	11–4, 11–1, 11–8
Sivasangari Subramaniam	3–0	Lee Ji-hyun	11–4, 11–4, 11–5

==== Gold medal match ====
30 September	Hong Kong	1–2	Malaysia

Tong Tsz Wing	3–2	Rachel Arnold	7–11, 11–7, 8–11, 11–8, 11–6
Ho Tze Lok	0–3	Sivasangari Subramaniam	5–11, 8–11, 6–11
Chan Sin Yuk	1–3	Aifa Azman	5–11, 8–11, 13–11, 8–11
