= Squash World Cup =

Squash mixed team tournament

Tournament information
- Sport: Squash
- Established: 1996
- Administrator: World Squash
- Tournament formats: Round-robin; Knockout
- Host: India
- Venue: Chennai
- Teams: 12
- Most championships: Egypt (2 titles)

Final positions
- Champions: India
- 1st runners-up: Hong Kong
- 2nd runners-up: Egypt, Japan

The Squash World Cup is an international mixed team squash tournament hosted by World Squash. The first edition took place in 1996. The 2025 edition was the latest.

== Format ==
The World Cup consists of two round robin pools, followed by a knockout stage national team squads of each country, represented by two men and two women, play ties of four matches against each other. All matches are played to a best of 5 games to 7 points.

At 6-6, the game will still be played to 7 points. In the knockout stage, in the event of a draw the winning team will be decided by greater positive difference between games won and lost in a tie.

== Editions and results ==
Year	Host	Winners	Second Place	Third Place	Ref
1996	Petaling Jaya	Australia	England	Egypt	
1999	Den Bosch	England	Scotland	Australia	
2011	Chennai	Egypt	England	Australia	
2023	Chennai	Egypt	Malaysia	India Japan	
2025	Chennai	India	Hong Kong	Egypt Japan	

== Squads ==
=== 2023 ===
Australia
- Jessica Turnbull
- Joseph White
- Alexandra Haydon
- Nicholas Calvert
Colombia
- Laura Tovar Pérez
- Felipe Tovar
- Catalina Peláez
- Alfonso Marroquín
Egypt
- Fayrouz Aboelkheir
- Aly Abou Eleinen
- Kenzy Ayman
- Karim El Hammamy
Hong Kong
- Heylie Fung
- Andes Ling
- Toby Tse
- Chung Yat Long
India
- Joshna Chinappa
- Saurav Ghosal
- Tanvi Khanna
- Abhay Singh
Japan
- Satomi Watanabe
- Ryūnosuke Tsukue
- Akari Midorikawa
- Tomotaka Endo
Malaysia
- Aira Azman
- Darren Pragasam
- Yee Xin Ying
- Ong Sai Hung
South Africa
- Lizelle Muller
- Dewald van Niekerk
- Hayley Ward
- Jean-Pierre Brits

=== 2025 ===
Australia
- Dylan Molinaro
- Joseph White
- Madison Lyon
- Jessica Turnbull
Brazil
- Laura Silva
- Diego Gobbi
- Bruna Petrillo
- Pedro Mometto
Egypt
- Adam Hawal
- Ibrahim Elkabbani
- Nour Heikal
- Nardine Garas
Hong Kong
- Lau Tsz Kwan
- Henry Leung
- Ho Tze Lok
- Lee Ka Yi
India
- Anahat Singh
- Abhay Singh
- Joshna Chinappa
- Velavan Senthilkumar
Iran
- Sepehr Etemadpour
- Pouya Shafiefard
- Fereshteh Eghtedari
- Fatemeh Falahati
Japan
- Tomotaka Endo
- Ryunosuke Tsukue
- Akari Midorikawa
- Satomi Watanabe
Malaysia
- Ameeshenraj Chandaran
- Mohd Syafiq Kamal
- Aifa Azman
- Aira Azman
Poland
- Kajetan Lipski
- Jan Samborski
- Karina Tyma
- Karina Tyma
South Korea
- Ryu Jeongmin
- Ko Youngjo
- Eum Hwayeong
- Song Chaewon
South Africa
- Damian Groenewald
- Dewald van Niekerk
- Teagan Russell
- Hayley Ward
Switzerland
- Robin Gadola
- Louai Hafez
- Stella Kaufmann
- Celine Walser
