= India national squash team =

India national squash team may refer to:

- India men's national squash team
- India women's national squash team
