= Raj Manchanda =

Indian squash player (1945–2024)

Personal information
- Nicknames: Old Fox; The Major
- Nationality: Indian
- Born: 5 August 1945 Abohar, Punjab Province, British India
- Died: 1 December 2024 (aged 79) New Delhi, India

Sport
- Country: India
- Sport: Squash
Medal record
Men's squash
Representing India
Asian Team Squash Championships
Silver medal – second place	1981 Karachi	Men's championship
Bronze medal – third place	1984 Amman	Men's championship

Raj Manchanda (5 August 1945 – 1 December 2024) was an Indian squash player. He won six straight National Squash Championships from 1977 to 1982. Also a member of the Arjuna Award, he received the Arjuna Award in 1980. In 1981, he received the Best Services Sportsman Award.

== Biography ==
Born in Abohar on 5 August 1945, Manchanda held six national championship titles and won every single one of his regional championships. During the 1980s, he faced Jahangir Khan, a future World Open champion, in the Asian Individual Squash Championships. At the Asian Team Squash Championships, he won a silver medal in 1981 and a bronze medal in 1984.

Manchanda died in New Delhi on 1 December 2024, at the age of 79.
