= India women's national squash team =

India
- Coach: Gautam Das
- Association: Squash Rackets Federation of India

World Team Championships
- First year: 2002
- Titles: 0
- Runners-up: 0
- Best finish: 5th (2012)
- Entries: 7

Asian Team Championships
- First year: 1990
- Titles: (2012)
- Runners-up: (2002, 2010, 2016)
- Entries: 15

The India national women's squash team represents India in international squash team competitions, and is governed by the Squash Rackets Federation of India. The team has participated in two quarter-finals of the World Team Championships with 5th being their highest ever placement.

== Medal table ==
Tournament	1st place, gold medalist(s)	2nd place, silver medalist(s)	3rd place, bronze medalist(s)	Total
World Championships	4	0	0	4
World Cup	1	0	1	2
Asian Games	1	2	6	9
Asian Championships	7	4	7	16
South Asian Games	4	0	0	4
Total	17	6	13	37

Note: Table includes women's individual, women's + mixed doubles pairs and women's team medals

== Current squad ==
- Anahat Singh
- Akanksha Salunkhe
- Joshna Chinappa
- Dipika Pallikal
- Tanvi Khanna
- Urwashi Joshi
- Anjali Semwal
- Nirupama Dubey

== Current rankings ==
As of April 2026

#	Player	World Rank
1	Anahat Singh	18
2	Tanvi Khanna	71
3	Joshna Chinappa	73
4	Akanksha Salunkhe	108
5	Shameena Riaz	158
6	Anjali Semwal	160
7	Nirupama Dubey	227
8	Urwashi Joshi	311

== Highest rankings ==
Note: Only players in top 100, active in bold

Player	Highest
Dipika Pallikal	10
**Joshna Chinappa**	10
**Anahat Singh**	18
**Akanksha Salunkhe**	62
**Tanvi Khanna**	69

== Olympic Games ==
Edition	Venue	Player	Result
2028	(United States) California		

== World Championships ==
=== Team ===
Edition	Venue	Result	Position	W	L
1979	(England) Birmingham	Did not participate			
1981	(Canada) Toronto	Did not participate			
1983	(Australia) Perth	Did not participate			
1985	(Republic of Ireland) Dublin	Did not participate			
1987	(New Zealand) Auckland	Did not participate			
1989	(Netherlands) Warmond	Did not participate			
1990	(Australia) Sydney	Did not participate			
1992	(Canada) Vancouver	Did not participate			
1994	(England) Guernsey	Did not participate			
1996	(Malaysia) Petaling Jaya	Did not participate			
1998	(Germany) Stuttgart	Did not participate			
2000	(England) Sheffield 2000	Did not participate			
2002	(Denmark) Odense	Group Stage	18th	1	5
2004	(Netherlands) Amsterdam	Did not participate			
2006	(Canada) Edmonton	Did not participate			
2008	(Egypt) Cairo	Did not participate			
2010	(New Zealand) Palmerston North	Group Stage	11th	3	3
2012	(France) Nîmes	**Quarter Finals**	**5th**	5	1
2014	(Canada) Niagara-on-the-Lake	Group Stage	14th	2	6
2016	(France) Issy-les-Moulineaux	Group Stage	9th	4	2
2018	(China) Dalian	Group Stage	12th	1	2
2022	(Egypt) Cairo	Did not participate			
2024	Hong Kong	**Quarter Finals**	7th	4	3

=== Doubles ===
Edition	Venue	Players	Category	Position	Ref
2022	(Scotland) Glasgow	Dipika Pallikal; Joshna Chinappa	WD	Champions	
2022	(Scotland) Glasgow	Dipika Pallikal; Saurav Ghosal	XD	Champions	
2024	(Scotland) Glasgow	Dipika Pallikal; Joshna Chinappa	WD	Champions	
2024	(Scotland) Glasgow	Dipika Pallikal; Saurav Ghosal	XD	Champions	

=== Individual ===
Edition	Venue	Player	Result
None

== World Cup ==
Edition	Venue	Team	Position	Ref
1999	(Netherlands) Hertogenbosch		Fifth Place	
2023	(India) Chennai	Joshna Chinappa; Saurav Ghosal; Tanvi Khanna; Abhay Singh	Third Place	
2025	(India) Chennai	Anahat Singh; Abhay Singh; Joshna Chinappa; Velavan Senthilkumar	**Champions**	

== Asian Games ==
=== Team ===
Edition	Venue	Team	Result
2010	(China) Guangzhou	Anaka Alankamony; Joshna Chinappa; Dipika Pallikal; Anwesha Reddy	Third Place
2014	(South Korea) Incheon	Anaka Alankamony; Aparajitha Balamurukan; Joshna Chinappa; Dipika Pallikal	Runners Up
2018	(Indonesia) Jakarta	Joshna Chinappa; Tanvi Khanna; Sunayna Kuruvilla; Dipika Pallikal	Runners Up
2022	(China) Hangzhou	Joshna Chinappa; Tanvi Khanna; Dipika Pallikal; Anahat Singh	Third Place

=== Doubles ===
Edition	Venue	Players	Category	Result
2022	(China) Hangzhou	Dipika Pallikal; Harinder Pal Sandhu	XD	Champions
2022	(China) Hangzhou	Anahat Singh; Abhay Singh	XD	Third Place

=== Individual ===
Edition	Venue	Player	Result
2014	(South Korea) Incheon	Dipika Pallikal	Third Place
2018	(Indonesia) Jakarta	Joshna Chinappa	Third Place
2018	(Indonesia) Jakarta	Dipika Pallikal	Third Place

== Asian Championships ==
=== Team ===
Edition	Venue	Position
1986	(Malaysia) Kuala Lumpur	Did not participate
1988	Kuwait City	Did not participate
1990	(India) Kolkata	Third Place
1992	(Pakistan) Peshawar	Third Place
1994	(Malaysia) Kuala Lumpur	Did not participate
1996	(Jordan) Amman	Fourth Place
1998	(Malaysia) Kuala Lumpur	Fifth Place
2000	Hong Kong	Fifth Place
2002	(Malaysia) Kuala Lumpur	Runners Up
2004	(Malaysia) Kuala Lumpur	Fourth Place
2006	(Chinese Taipei) Taiwan	Did not participate
2008	Kuwait City	Fifth Place
2010	(India) Chennai	Runners Up
2012	Kuwait City	Champions
2014	Hong Kong	Third Place
2016	(Chinese Taipei) Taiwan	Runners Up
2018	(South Korea) Cheongju	Did not participate
2021	(Malaysia) Kuala Lumpur	Third Place
2022	(South Korea) Cheongju	Third Place
2024	(China) Dalian	Fifth Place

=== Doubles ===
Edition	Venue	Players	Category	Position	Ref
2023	(China) Hangzhou	Dipika Pallikal; Harinder Pal Sandhu	XD	Champions	
2023	(China) Hangzhou	Anahat Singh; Abhay Singh	XD	Third Place	
2024	(Malaysia) Johor	Abhay Singh; Joshna Chinappa	XD	Champions	
2025	(Malaysia) Kuala Lumpur	Anahat Singh; Joshna Chinappa	WD	Champions	
2025	(Malaysia) Kuala Lumpur	Anahat Singh; Abhay Singh	XD	Champions	
2025	(Malaysia) Kuala Lumpur	Joshna Chinappa; Velavan Senthilkumar	XD	Third Place	

=== Individual ===
Edition	Venue	Player	Position	Ref
2017	(India) Chennai	(India) Joshna Chinappa	Champion	
2017	(India) Chennai	(India) Dipika Pallikal	Runners Up	
2019	(Malaysia) Kuala Lumpur	(India) Joshna Chinappa	Champion	

== Awards and nominations ==
Year	Award	Category	Result	Ref
2012	ASF Awards	Outstanding Team Women	Won	

== See also ==
- Squash in India
- Squash Rackets Federation of India
- India men's national squash team
