= Malaysia national squash team =

Malaysia national squash team may refer to:

- Malaysia men's national squash team
- Malaysia women's national squash team
