= Velavan Senthilkumar =

Indian squash player (born 1998)

Personal information
- Born: 26 March 1998 (age 28) Salem, Tamil Nadu, India
- Education: Columbia University; Don Bosco School
- Height: 1.78 m (5 ft 10 in)
- Weight: 63 kg (139 lb)
- Spouse: Aaradhana Kasturiraj (m. 2024)

Sport
- Country: India
- Handedness: Left-handed
- Club: Columbia Lions; (2017–2022)
- Coached by: Paul Price; Cyrus Poncha
- Retired: Active
- Racquet used: Tecnifibre

Men's singles
- Highest ranking: 39 (March 2025)
- Current ranking: 42 (November 2026)
- Title: 11
- Tour final: 15
- PSA Profile
Medal record
Men's squash
Representing India
World Cup
Gold medal – first place	2025 Chennai	Mixed team
Asian Games
Bronze medal – third place	2026 Aichi–Nagoya	Mixed team
Asian Championships
Gold medal – first place	2022 Cheongju	Team
Gold medal – first place	2024 Johor	Doubles
Gold medal – first place	2025 Kuala Lumpur	Doubles
Silver medal – second place	2021 Kuala Lumpur	Team
Silver medal – second place	2023 Hong Kong	Singles
Bronze medal – third place	2025 Kuala Lumpur	Singles
Bronze medal – third place	2025 Kuala Lumpur	Mixed doubles
Asian Junior Championships
Gold medal – first place	2016 Kuala Lumpur	Singles
Gold medal – first place	2017 Hong Kong	Team

Velavan Senthilkumar (born 26 March 1998) is an Indian professional squash player. He is a World Cup gold medallist and a three-time Asian Champion.

== Early life ==
Velavan was born 26 March 1998, in Salem, Tamil Nadu, India to Shanmukham Priyadharshini and Ramasamy Senthilkumar. While his mother was a part of the national badminton team, his father played basketball for the country. His brother Guhan, a student of the University of Manchester, also plays squash. Senthilkumar finished his education from Don Bosco School. When he won the British Junior Open during the 2017 edition, several college coaches contacted him. After some deliberation, he decided to move to the United States to be a part of Columbia University, New York. He became a part of the college's squash team Columbia Lions.

== Personal life ==
Senthilkumar married fellow Indian squash player Aaradhana Kasturiraj in June 2024.

== Career ==
In 2016, Senthilkumar won the Asian Junior Championships defeating Mohammad Al-Saraj. He then won the 2017 British Junior Open, besting his compatriot Abhay Singh in the final. He bagged his first PSA title in April 2018 at the Madison Open in Wisconsin. He is coached by Paul Price.

== Titles and finals ==
Year	Tournament	Opponent	Result	Score	Ref(s)
2017	British Junior Open	(India) Abhay Singh	Win	3–1 (16–14, 11–2, 10–12, 11–7)	

== Awards and nominations ==
Year	Award	Category	Result	Ref
2017	ASF Awards	Outstanding Performance Junior Men	Won	
2023	ASF Awards	Outstanding Team Men	Won	
2025	Times of India Sports Awards	Squash Player of the Year Male	TBA	

== See also ==
- Squash in India
- India men's national squash team
