= Abhay Singh (squash player) =

Indian squash player (born 1998)

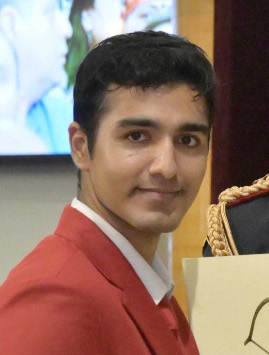
- Singh in 2025

Personal information
- Born: 3 September 1998 (age 28) Chennai, Tamil Nadu, India
- Education: Guru Nanak College
- Height: 1.83 m (6 ft 0 in)
- Weight: 75 kg (165 lb)

Sport
- Country: India
- Handedness: Right-handed
- Turned pro: 2017
- Coached by: James Willstrop; Harinder Pal Sandhu
- Racquet used: Head

Men's singles
- Highest ranking: 22 (April 2026)
- Current ranking: 26 (September 2026)
- Title: 13
- Tour final: 18
- PSA Profile
Medal record
Men's squash
Representing India
World Cup
Gold medal – first place	2025 Chennai	Mixed team
Bronze medal – third place	2023 Chennai	Mixed team
Asian Games
Gold medal – first place	2022 Hangzhou	Team
Silver medal – second place	2026 Aichi–Nagoya	Singles
Bronze medal – third place	2022 Hangzhou	Mixed doubles
Asian Championships
Gold medal – first place	2022 Cheongju	Team
Gold medal – first place	2024 Johor	Doubles
Gold medal – first place	2024 Johor	Mixed doubles
Gold medal – first place	2025 Kuala Lumpur	Doubles
Gold medal – first place	2025 Kuala Lumpur	Mixed doubles
Gold medal – first place	2026 Sarawak	Doubles
Bronze medal – third place	2023 Hangzhou	Mixed doubles
South Asian Games
Silver medal – second place	2019 Kathmandu	Team
Bronze medal – third place	2019 Kathmandu	Singles
Asian Junior Championships
Gold medal – first place	2017 Hong Kong	Team
Bronze medal – third place	2016 Kuala Lumpur	Singles

Abhay Singh (born 3 September 1998) is an Indian squash player. He is a World Cup and Asian Games gold medalist, and a six-time Asian Champion. Singh has also competed at the Premier Squash League.

== Coaching ==
Singh has been coached by notable former squash players James Willstrop, Harinder Pal Sandhu, David Campion, Malcolm Willstrop, and Baskar Balamurugan.

== World Tour ==
Year	Tournament	Opponent	Result	Score	Ref(s)
2016	Doha Junior Open	(Pakistan) Israr Ahmed	Loss	0–3 (11–4, 11–7, 11–7)	
2017	British Junior Open	(India) Velavan Senthilkumar	Loss	1–3 (14–16, 2–11, 12–10, 7–11)	
2017	North Coast Open	(Switzerland) Dimitri Steinmann	Loss	0–3 (5–11, 1–11, 5–11)	
2018	Qatar Circuit VI	(Kuwait) Abdullah Al-Muzayen	Loss	0–3 (2–11, 3–11, 2–11)	
2018	Sutton Coldfield International	(France) Victor Crouin	Loss	0–3 (4–11, 6–11, 18–11)	
2020	British U23 Open	(England) Ben Smith	Win	3–0 (11–4, 11–5, 11–5)	
2022	HCL-SRFI India Tour	(Egypt) Khaled Labib	Win	3–0 (11–4, 11–3, 11–4)	
2023	HCL PSA Challenger	(Egypt) Yassin ElShafei	Win	3–1 (10–12, 11–7, 11–4, 11–9)	
2024	Willingdon Masters	(India) Suraj Chand	Win	3–0 (11–9, 11–5, 11–2)	
2024	Goodfellow Classic	(Wales) Elliott Morris Devred	Win	3–0 (11–7, 11–9, 11–9)	
2024	Tuanku Muhriz Trophy	(Hong Kong) Lau Tsz Kwan	Win	3–1 (7–11, 11–8, 12–10, 11–4)	
2025	JSW Indian Open	(Egypt) Kareem El Torkey	Loss	3–1 (10–12, 4–11, 11–7, 10–12)	
2025	Hyder Trophy	(England) Sam Todd	Win	3–1 (11–8, 10–12, 11–9, 11–7)	
2026	JSW Indian Open	(India) Veer Chotrani	Win	3–0 (11–9, 11–8, 11–4)	
2026	Tuanku Muhriz Trophy	(Hong Kong) Henry Leung	Win	3–2 (11–7, 6–11, 3–11, 11–5, 12–10)	

== Awards and nominations ==
Year	Award	Category	Result	Ref
2023	ASF Awards	Outstanding Team Men	Won	
2023	PSA Awards	Challenger Player of the Year	Won	
2023	Times of India Sports Awards	Male Squash Player of the Year	Nominated	
2024	Arjuna Award	Outstanding Performance in Sports	Won	
2024	Times of India Sports Awards	Squash Player of the Year Male	TBA	

== See also ==
- Squash in India
- India men's national squash team
