= European Junior Squash Championships =

Sporting event

- Website; Official website

Results
- Champion: (France) Amir Khaled-Jousselin (2026) (France) Lauren Baltayan (2026)

The European Junior Squash Championships are the event which serves as the European junior championship for squash players organised by the European Squash Federation.

== Past results ==
=== Junior Individual Championships ===
==== Boys U19 ====
Year	Venue	Country	Champion
1989	(France) Aix-en-Provence	ENG	Peter Marshall
1990	No competition		
1991	(Austria) Linz	ENG	Paul Johnson
1992	(Norway) Oslo	FIN	Juha Raumolin
1993	(Denmark) Odense	ENG	Adam Toes
1994	(Italy) Bolzano	ENG	Paul Hargrave
1995	(Israel) Tel Aviv	ENG	Marcus Cowie
1996	(Germany) Recklinghausen	ENG	Lee Beachill
1997	(Finland) Vantaa	FIN	Olli Tuominen
1998	(Belgium) Herentals	NED	Tommy Berden
1999	(Austria) Vienna	ENG	Adrian Grant
2000	(Germany) Bremen	FRA	Grégory Gaultier
2001	(Belgium) Antwerp	FRA	Grégory Gaultier
2002	(France) Aix-en-Provence	ENG	James Willstrop
2003	(Germany) Parsdorf	NED	Dylan Bennett
2004	(Belgium) Herentals	ENG	Laurence Delasaux
2005	(Sweden) Malmö	ENG	Chris Simpson
2006	(Switzerland) Langnau	GER	Simon Rösner
2007	(Belgium) Herentals	SWI	Nicolas Müller
2008	(Norway) Stavanger	FRA	Grégoire Marche
2009	(Germany) Germering	ENG	Anthony Graham
2010	(Austria) Vienna	FRA	Lucas Serme
2011	(Switzerland) Kriens	ENG	Nathan Lake
2012	(Portugal) Porto	ENG	Declan James
2013	(Switzerland) Langnau	ENG	Ollie Holland
2014	(Finland) Helsinki	ENG	Richie Fallows
2015	(Czech Republic) Prague	ENG	George Parker
2016	(Switzerland) Kriens	ENG	Patrick Rooney
2017	(Portugal) Lisbon	FRA	Victor Crouin
2018	(Poland) Bielsko-Biała	FRA	Victor Crouin
2019	(Czech Republic) Prague	CZE	Viktor Byrtus
2020	Cancelled due to COVID-19 pandemic in Europe		
2021	Cancelled due to COVID-19 pandemic in Europe		
2022	(Netherlands) Eindhoven	ENG	Finnlay Withington
2023	(Switzerland) Langnau am Albis	ENG	Jonah Bryant
2024	(Romania) Bucharest	ENG	Jonah Bryant
2025	(Czech Republic) Prague	FRA	Amir Khaled-Jousselin
2026	(Poland) Kraków	FRA	Amir Khaled-Jousselin

==== Girls U19 ====
Year	Venue	Country	Champion
1989	(France) Aix-en-Provence	ENG	Cassie Jackman
1990	No competition		
1991	(Austria) Linz	ENG	Cassie Jackman
1992	(Norway) Oslo	GER	Sabine Schöne
1993	(Denmark) Odense	GER	Silke Bartel
1994	(Italy) Bolzano	ENG	Donia Leeves
1995	(Israel) Tel Aviv	ENG	Tracey Shenton
1996	(Germany) Recklinghausen	ENG	Janie Thacker
1997	(Finland) Vantaa	ENG	Tania Bailey
1998	(Belgium) Herentals	ENG	Tania Bailey
1999	(Austria) Vienna	ENG	Vicky Lankester
2000	(Germany) Bremen	ENG	Dominique Lloyd-Walter
2001	(Belgium) Antwerp	ENG	Jenny Duncalf
2002	(France) Aix-en-Provence	SWI	Manuela Zehnder
2003	(Germany) Parsdorf	ENG	Suzie Pierrepont
2004	(Belgium) Herentals	BEL	Charlie de Rycke
2005	(Sweden) Malmö	BEL	Charlie de Rycke
2006	(Switzerland) Langnau	FRA	Camille Serme
2007	(Belgium) Herentals	FRA	Camille Serme
2008	(Norway) Stavanger	FRA	Camille Serme
2009	(Germany) Germering	ENG	Sarah-Jane Perry
2010	(Austria) Vienna	ENG	Carrie Ramsey
2011	(Switzerland) Kriens	ENG	Emily Whitlock
2012	(Portugal) Porto	ENG	Emily Whitlock
2013	(Switzerland) Langnau	ENG	Victoria Temple-Murray
2014	(Finland) Helsinki	BEL	Nele Gilis
2015	(Czech Republic) Prague	ENG	Georgina Kennedy
2016	(Switzerland) Kriens	ENG	Amelia Henley
2017	(Portugal) Lisbon	ESP	Cristina Gómez
2018	(Poland) Bielsko-Biała	ENG	Lucy Turmel
2019	(Czech Republic) Prague	POL	Karina Tyma
2020	Cancelled due to COVID-19 pandemic in Europe		
2021	Cancelled due to COVID-19 pandemic in Europe		
2022	(Netherlands) Eindhoven	ENG	Katie Malliff
2023	(Switzerland) Langnau am Albis	ENG	Asia Harris
2024	(Romania) Bucharest	ENG	Amelie Haworth
2025	(Czech Republic) Prague	FRA	Lauren Baltayan
2026	(Poland) Kraków	FRA	Lauren Baltayan

=== Junior Team Championships ===
Countries enter teams of three players to represent them in the championships with two boys and one girl from 1984 to 2024, and four players with two boys and two girls since 2025. In each round of the competition, teams face each other in a best-of-three singles matches contest.

Year	Venue	Champion	Runner-up	Score
1984	(Germany) Ludwigsburg	Sweden	England	2–1
1985	(Germany) Ludwigsburg	England	Sweden	3–0
1986	(Norway) Oslo	England	Sweden	3–0
1987	(Netherlands) Warmond	England	Scotland	3–0
1988	(Israel) Tel Aviv	England	Germany	3–0
1989	(France) Aix-en-Provence	England	Germany	3–0
1990	(Belgium) Ghent	England	Germany	3–0
1991	(Austria) Linz	England	Germany	3–0
1992	(Norway) Oslo	England	Finland	2–1
1993	(Denmark) Odense	England	France	3–0
1994	(Italy) Bolzano	England	France	2–1
1995	(Israel) Tel Aviv	England	Italy	3–0
1996	(Germany) Recklinghausen	England	Switzerland	3–0
1997	(Finland) Vantaa	England	Germany	3–0
1998	(Belgium) Herentals	England	Netherlands	3–0
1999	(Austria) Vienna	England	Spain	3–0
2000	(Germany) Bremen	England	Spain	2–1
2001	(Belgium) Antwerp	England	Germany	3–0
2002	(France) Aix-en-Provence	England	Switzerland	2–1
2003	(Germany) Parsdorf	England	Netherlands	2–1
2004	(Belgium) Herentals	England	France	3–0
2005	(Sweden) Malmö	England	Germany	3–0
2006	(Switzerland) Langnau	Germany	England	3–0
2007	(Belgium) Herentals	England	France	2–1
2008	(Norway) Stavanger	England	France	2–1
2009	(Germany) Germering	Germany	England	2–1
2010	(Austria) Vienna	England	Wales	3–0
2011	(Switzerland) Kriens	England	Belgium	3–0
2012	(Portugal) Porto	England	Belgium	3–0
2013	(Switzerland) Langnau	England	France	3–0
2014	(Finland) Helsinki	England	Spain	3–0
2015	(Czech Republic) Prague	England	Finland	3–0
2016	(Switzerland) Kriens	England	France	3–0
2017	(Portugal) Lisbon	England	Spain	2–0
2018	(Poland) Bielsko-Biała	England	France	2–1
2019	(Czech Republic) Prague	England	Switzerland	2–0
2020	Cancelled due to COVID-19 pandemic in Europe			
2021	Cancelled due to COVID-19 pandemic in Europe			
2022	(Netherlands) Eindhoven	England	France	2–1
2023	(Switzerland) Langnau am Albis	England	France	2–1
2024	(Romania) Bucharest	France	England	2–1
2025	(Czech Republic) Prague	France	England	2–2^{(pts:134–114)}
2026	(Poland) Kraków	France	England	2–2^{(pts:122–109)}

== See also ==
- World Junior Squash Championships
- European Squash Federation
- European Squash Individual Championships
- European Squash Team Championships
