= 2025 World Squash Junior Championships =

World Squash Junior Championships 2025

Details
- Event name: World Junior Championships
- Location: Egypt
- Venue: Cairo, Egypt
- Website www.wsfworldjuniors.com

Winners
- Men's: (Egypt) Mohamed Zakaria
- Women's: (Egypt) Amina Orfi

The 2025 World Squash Junior Championships will be the 2025 edition of the World Squash Junior Championships, which serves as the individual world junior championship for squash. The event took place in Cairo, Egypt from 21 to 26 July 2025. The women's and men's seeds were announced on 7 July 2025.

== Seeds ==
=== Women ===
1. (Egypt) Amina Orfi
2. (India) Anahat Singh
3. (Egypt) Nadien Elhammamy
4. (Egypt) Janna Galal
5. (France) Lauren Baltayan
6. (Egypt) Malika Elkaraksy
7. (Egypt) Sohaila Hazem
8. (Hong Kong) Ena Kwong

=== Men ===
1. (Egypt) Mohamad Zakaria
2. (South Korea) Jooyoung Na
3. (Egypt) Marwan Asal
4. (Egypt) Eiad Daoud
5. (United States) Christian Capella
6. (United States) Alexander Dartnell
7. (Pakistan) Abdullah Nawaz
8. (Malaysia) Low Wa-Sern

== Final Four ==
=== Women ===
1. (Egypt) Amina Orfi
2. (India) Anahat Singh
3. (Egypt) Nadien Elhammamy
4. (Egypt) Malika Elkaraksy
