= India men's national squash team =

India
- Coach: Cyrus Poncha
- Association: Squash Rackets Federation of India

World Team Championships
- First year: 1967
- Titles: 0
- Runners-up: 0
- Best finish: 5th (1967, 2024)
- Entries: 12

Asian Team Championships
- First year: 1981
- Titles: (2022)
- Runners-up: (1982, 2012, 2021)
- Entries: 18

The India men's national squash team represents India in international squash team competitions, and is governed by Squash Rackets Federation of India.

Since 1967, the men's team has participated in three quarter finals of the World Team Championships.

== Medal table ==
Tournament	1st place, gold medalist(s)	2nd place, silver medalist(s)	3rd place, bronze medalist(s)	Total
World Championships	0	0	0	0
World Cup	1	0	1	2
Asian Games	3	2	6	11
Asian Championships	7	5	10	22
South Asian Games	1	5	0	6
Total	13	12	17	42

Note: Includes men's individual, men's + mixed doubles and men's team

== Current squad ==
- Ramit Tandon
- Velavan Senthilkumar
- Abhay Singh
- Veer Chotrani
- Saurav Ghosal
- Suraj Chand

== Current rankings ==
As of June 2026

Position	Player	World Rank
1	Abhay Singh	24
2	Ramit Tandon	43
3	Veer Chotrani	38
4	Velavan Senthilkumar	54
5	Suraj Chand	172
6	Abhishek Agarwal	203
7	Om Semwal	207
8	Rahul Baitha	250

== Highest rankings ==
Note: Only players in top 100, active in bold

Player	Highest
Saurav Ghosal	10
**Abhay Singh**	26
**Ramit Tandon**	28
**Velavan Senthilkumar**	39
Vikram Malhotra	43
Mahesh Mangaonkar	44
Harinder Pal Sandhu	47
**Veer Chotrani**	38

== Olympic Games ==
Edition	Venue	Player	Result
2028	(United States) California		

== World Championships ==
=== Team ===
Edition	Venue	Result	Position	W	L
1967	(Australia) Melbourne	Group Stage	**5th**	1	4
1969	(England) Birmingham	Did not participate			
1971	(New Zealand) Palmerston North	Group Stage	6th	1	5
1973	(South Africa) Johannesburg	Did not participate			
1976	(England) Birmingham	Group Stage	7th	3	4
1977	(Canada) Toronto	Did not participate			
1979	(Australia) Brisbane	Group Stage	7th	4	4
1981	(Sweden) Stockholm	Did not participate			
1983	(New Zealand) Auckland	Did not participate			
1985	(Egypt) Cairo	Did not participate			
1987	(England) London	Did not participate			
1989	Singapore	Did not participate			
1991	(Finland) Helsinki	Did not participate			
1993	(Pakistan) Karachi	Did not participate			
1995	(Egypt) Cairo	Group Stage	28th	1	5
1997	(Malaysia) Petaling Jaya	Did not participate			
1999	(Egypt) Cairo	Did not participate			
2001	(Australia) Melbourne	Did not participate			
2003	(Austria) Vienna	Did not participate			
2005	(Pakistan) Islamabad	Round of 16	11th	2	3
2007	(India) Chennai	Quarter Final	8th	3	4
2009	(Denmark) Odense	Group Stage	18th	3	3
2011	(Germany) Paderborn	Quarter Final	7th	4	3
2013	(France) Mulhouse	Quarter Final	7th	5	3
2015	(Egypt) Cairo	Cancelled			
2017	(France) Marseille	Quarter Final	7th	3	3
2019	(United States) Washington	Did not participate			
2023	(New Zealand) Tauranga	Did not participate			
2024	Hong Kong	Quarter Final	**5th**	4	2

=== Doubles ===
Edition	Venue	Players	Category	Position	Ref
2022	(Scotland) Glasgow	Dipika Pallikal; Saurav Ghosal	XD	Champions	
2024	(Scotland) Glasgow	Dipika Pallikal; Saurav Ghosal	XD	Champions	

=== Individual ===
Edition	Venue	Player	Result
None

== World Cup ==
Edition	Venue	Team	Position	Ref
1999	(Netherlands) Hertogenbosch		Fifth Place	
2023	(India) Chennai	Joshna Chinappa; Saurav Ghosal; Tanvi Khanna; Abhay Singh	Third Place	

== Asian Games ==
=== Team ===
Edition	Venue	Team	Result
2010	(China) Guangzhou	Saurav Ghosal; Sandeep Jangra; Harinder Pal Sandhu; Siddharth Suchde	Third Place
2014	(South Korea) Incheon	Saurav Ghosal; Kush Kumar; Mahesh Mangaonkar; Harinder Pal Sandhu	Champions
2018	(Indonesia) Jakarta	Saurav Ghosal; Mahesh Mangaonkar; Harinder Pal Sandhu; Ramit Tandon	Third Place
2022	(China) Hangzhou	Saurav Ghosal; Mahesh Mangaonkar; Harinder Pal Sandhu; Abhay Singh	Champions

=== Doubles ===
Edition	Venue	Players	Category	Result
2022	(China) Hangzhou	Dipika Pallikal; Harinder Pal Sandhu	XD	Champions
2022	(China) Hangzhou	Anahat Singh; Abhay Singh	XD	Third Place

=== Individual ===
Edition	Venue	Player	Result
2006	(Qatar) Doha	Saurav Ghosal	Third Place
2010	(China) Guangzhou	Saurav Ghosal	Third Place
2014	(South Korea) Incheon	Saurav Ghosal	Runners Up
2018	(Indonesia) Jakarta	Saurav Ghosal	Third Place
2022	(China) Hangzhou	Saurav Ghosal	Runners Up

== Asian Championships ==
=== Team ===
Edition	Venue	Position
1981	(Pakistan) Karachi	Runners Up
1984	(Jordan) Amman	Third Place
1986	(Malaysia) Kuala Lumpur	Third Place
1988	Kuwait City	Sixth Place
1990	(India) Kolkata	Third Place
1992	(Pakistan) Peshawar	Did not participate
1994	(Malaysia) Kuala Lumpur	Fourth Place
1996	(Jordan) Amman	Fifth Place
1998	(Malaysia) Kuala Lumpur	Fourth Place
2000	Hong Kong	Fourth Place
2002	(Malaysia) Kuala Lumpur	Fourth Place
2004	(Malaysia) Kuala Lumpur	Third Place
2006	(Chinese Taipei) Taiwan	Fourth Place
2008	Kuwait City	Fourth Place
2010	(India) Chennai	Third Place
2012	Kuwait City	Runners Up
2014	Hong Kong	Third Place
2016	(Chinese Taipei) Taiwan	Third Place
2018	(South Korea) Cheongju	Did not participate
2021	(Malaysia) Kuala Lumpur	Runners Up
2022	(South Korea) Cheongju	Champions
2024	(China) Dalian	Sixth Place

=== Doubles ===
Edition	Venue	Players	Category	Position	Ref
2023	(China) Hangzhou	Dipika Pallikal; Harinder Pal Sandhu	XD	Champions	
2023	(China) Hangzhou	Anahat Singh; Abhay Singh	XD	Third Place	
2024	(Malaysia) Johor	Abhay Singh; Velavan Senthilkumar	MD	Champions	
2024	(Malaysia) Johor	Abhay Singh; Joshna Chinappa	XD	Champions	
2025	(Malaysia) Kuala Lumpur	Abhay Singh; Velavan Senthilkumar	MD	Champions	
2025	(Malaysia) Kuala Lumpur	Anahat Singh; Abhay Singh	XD	Champions	
2025	(Malaysia) Kuala Lumpur	Joshna Chinappa; Velavan Senthilkumar	XD	Third Place	

=== Individual ===
Edition	Venue	Player	Position
2017	(India) Chennai	Saurav Ghosal	Runners Up
2019	(Malaysia) Kuala Lumpur	Saurav Ghosal	Champion
2023	Hong Kong	Velavan Senthilkumar	Runners Up
2025	(Malaysia) Kuala Lumpur	Velavan Senthilkumar	Third Place

== South Asian Games ==
TBA

== Awards and nominations ==
Year	Award	Category	Result	Ref
2003	ASF Awards	Outstanding Team Men	Won	
2013	ASF Awards	Outstanding Team Men	Won	
2014	ASF Awards	Outstanding Team Men	Won	
2022	ASF Awards	Outstanding Team Men	Won	
2023	ASF Awards	Outstanding Team Men	Won	

== See also ==
- Squash in India
- Squash Rackets Federation of India
- India women's national squash team
