= Squash at the 2022 Asian Games =

- Venue: Hangzhou Olympic Expo Squash Court
- Dates: 26 September – 5 October 2023
- Competitors: 92 from 16 nations

Squash at the 2022 Asian Games was held at the Hangzhou Olympic Sports Park Expo Center Squash Venue, Hangzhou, China, from 26 September to 5 October 2023.

Malaysia finished first in medal table by winning three gold medals. India won the remaining two gold medals.

== Schedule ==
P	Preliminary rounds	¼	Quarterfinals	½	Semifinals	F	Final

Event↓/Date →	26th Tue	27th Wed	28th Thu	29th Fri	30th Sat	1st Sun	2nd Mon	3rd Tue		4th Wed	5th Thu
Men's singles						P	P	¼		½	F
Men's team	P	P	P	½	F						
Women's singles						P	P	¼		½	F
Women's team	P	P	P	½	F						
Mixed doubles						P	P	P	¼	½	F

== Medalists ==
Event	Gold	Silver	Bronze
Men's singles	Ng Eain Yow; Malaysia	Saurav Ghosal; India	Abdulla Al-Tamimi; Qatar
Men's singles	Ng Eain Yow; Malaysia	Saurav Ghosal; India	Henry Leung; Hong Kong
Men's team	India; Saurav Ghosal; Mahesh Mangaonkar; Harinder Pal Sandhu; Abhay Singh	Pakistan; Nasir Iqbal; Asim Khan; Farhan Zaman; Noor Zaman	Malaysia; Addeen Idrakie; Mohd Syafiq Kamal; Ng Eain Yow; Ivan Yuen
Men's team	India; Saurav Ghosal; Mahesh Mangaonkar; Harinder Pal Sandhu; Abhay Singh	Pakistan; Nasir Iqbal; Asim Khan; Farhan Zaman; Noor Zaman	Hong Kong; Lau Tsz Kwan; Henry Leung; Tang Ming Hong; Wong Chi Him
Women's singles	Sivasangari Subramaniam; Malaysia	Chan Sin Yuk; Hong Kong	Satomi Watanabe; Japan
Women's singles	Sivasangari Subramaniam; Malaysia	Chan Sin Yuk; Hong Kong	Ho Tze Lok; Hong Kong
Women's team	Malaysia; Rachel Arnold; Aifa Azman; Aira Azman; Sivasangari Subramaniam	Hong Kong; Chan Sin Yuk; Ho Tze Lok; Lee Ka Yi; Tong Tsz Wing	India; Joshna Chinappa; Dipika Pallikal; Tanvi Khanna; Anahat Singh
Women's team	Malaysia; Rachel Arnold; Aifa Azman; Aira Azman; Sivasangari Subramaniam	Hong Kong; Chan Sin Yuk; Ho Tze Lok; Lee Ka Yi; Tong Tsz Wing	South Korea; Eum Hwa-yeong; Heo Min-gyeong; Lee Ji-hyun; Yang Yeon-soo
Mixed doubles	India; Harinder Pal Sandhu; Dipika Pallikal	Malaysia; Mohd Syafiq Kamal; Aifa Azman	Hong Kong; Wong Chi Him; Lee Ka Yi
Mixed doubles	India; Harinder Pal Sandhu; Dipika Pallikal	Malaysia; Mohd Syafiq Kamal; Aifa Azman	India; Abhay Singh; Anahat Singh

== Medal table ==
Rank	Nation	Gold	Silver	Bronze	Total
1	Malaysia (MAS)	3	1	1	5
2	India (IND)	2	1	2	5
3	Hong Kong (HKG)	0	2	4	6
4	Pakistan (PAK)	0	1	0	1
5	Japan (JPN)	0	0	1	1
5	Qatar (QAT)	0	0	1	1
5	South Korea (KOR)	0	0	1	1
Totals (7 entries)		5	5	10	20

== Participating nations ==
A total of 92 athletes from 16 nations competed in squash at the 2022 Asian Games:

- China (2)
- Hong Kong (8)
- India (8)
- Japan (6)
- Kuwait (4)
- Macau (4)
- Malaysia (8)
- Mongolia (5)
- Nepal (6)
- Pakistan (8)
- Philippines (6)
- Qatar (4)
- Singapore (4)
- South Korea (8)
- Sri Lanka (3)
- Thailand (8)
