= Asian Junior Team Squash Championships =

Asian team squash competition

Details
- Event name: Asian Junior Team Squash Championships
- Website asiansquash.org

The Asian Junior Team Squash Championships are championships hosted every odd year to test which junior Asian team of squash players reigns supreme in boys and girls categories. The tournament is organised by Asian Squash Federation.

== Editions and results ==
=== Boys' championship ===
Year	Host	Champions	Runners up	Third Place
1983	Singapore	Pakistan	Malaysia	Singapore India
1985	Hong Kong	Pakistan	Singapore	Malaysia Hong Kong
1987	Karachi (Pakistan)	Pakistan	Malaysia	Singapore Hong Kong
1989	Manama (Bahrain)	Pakistan	Malaysia	India Singapore
1991	Colombo (Sri Lanka)	Pakistan	Malaysia	India Singapore
1993	Singapore	Pakistan	India	Malaysia Hong Kong
1995	Hong Kong	Malaysia	Pakistan	Hong Kong India
1997	Chennai (India)	Pakistan	Malaysia	India Hong Kong
1999	Kuala Lumpur (Malaysia)	Pakistan	Malaysia	Hong Kong India
2001	Chennai (India)	Pakistan	Malaysia	Kuwait India
2003	Islamabad (Pakistan)	Pakistan	India	Kuwait Malaysia
2005	Chennai (India)	Pakistan	Kuwait	Hong Kong India
2007	Hong Kong	Pakistan	Malaysia	India Hong Kong
2009	Chennai (India)	Malaysia	India	Hong Kong South Korea
2011	Ratmalana (Sri Lanka)	India	Pakistan	Malaysia Hong Kong
2013	Seoul (South Korea)	Pakistan	India	Malaysia Hong Kong
2015	Kuala Lumpur (Malaysia)	Malaysia	Pakistan	Hong Kong India
2017	Hong Kong	India	Malaysia	Hong Kong Pakistan
2019	Pattaya (Thailand)	Pakistan	India	Hong Kong Malaysia
2021	Kuala Lumpur (Malaysia)	Cancelled		
2023	Chennai (India)	Pakistan	India	South Korea Malaysia
2025	Hong Kong	South Korea	Malaysia	India Pakistan

Source: ASF

=== Girls' championship ===
Year	Host	Champions	Runners up	Third Place
1983	Singapore	Singapore	Hong Kong	Malaysia
1985	Hong Kong	Singapore	Philippines	Malaysia Hong Kong
1987	Karachi (Pakistan)	Singapore	Malaysia	Pakistan
1991	Colombo (Sri Lanka)	Malaysia	Hong Kong	Singapore
1993	Singapore	Malaysia	Singapore	Hong Kong Sri Lanka
1995	Hong Kong	Hong Kong	Malaysia	Singapore Sri Lanka
1997	Chennai (India)	Malaysia	Hong Kong	Singapore India
1999	Kuala Lumpur (Malaysia)	Malaysia	Hong Kong	India Singapore
2001	Chennai (India)	Malaysia	India	Hong Kong Singapore
2003	Islamabad (Pakistan)	India	Malaysia	Hong Kong Singapore
2005	Chennai (India)	Hong Kong	Malaysia	India Singapore
2007	Hong Kong	Hong Kong	Malaysia	Japan Pakistan
2009	Chennai (India)	Malaysia	South Korea	Hong Kong India
2011	Ratmalana (Sri Lanka)	Hong Kong	Malaysia	India Singapore
2013	Seoul (South Korea)	India	Hong Kong	Japan Malaysia
2015	Kuala Lumpur (Malaysia)	Malaysia	Hong Kong	India Singapore
2017	Hong Kong	Malaysia	Hong Kong	Japan Singapore
2019	Pattaya (Thailand)	Malaysia	Hong Kong	India South Korea
2021	Kuala Lumpur (Malaysia)	Cancelled		
2023	Chennai (India)	Malaysia	India	South Korea Hong Kong
2025	Hong Kong	Hong Kong	Malaysia	India Singapore

Source: ASF

== Statistics ==
=== Titles by country ===
==== Boys ====
15	Pakistan

3	Malaysia

2	India

==== Girls ====
9	Malaysia

4	Hong Kong

3	Singapore

2	India

== See also ==
- Squash
- Asian Squash Federation
- Asian Junior Individual Squash Championships
- Asian Individual Squash Championships
- Asian Team Squash Championships
- World Junior Squash Championships
