= Nasir Iqbal =

Pakistani squash player (born 1994)

Personal information
- Born: 1 April 1994 (age 32) Bannu, Pakistan
- Height: 1.79 m (5 ft 10 in)
- Weight: 70 kg (154 lb)

Sport
- Country: Pakistan
- Turned pro: 2008
- Coached by: (Pakistan) Tahir Iqbal Khan
- Retired: Active
- Racquet used: Prince

Men's singles
- Highest ranking: No. 35 (February 2016)
- Current ranking: No. 82 (July 2025)
Medal record
Men's squash
Representing Pakistan
Asian Games
Silver medal – second place	2022 Hangzhou	Team
Silver medal – second place	2026 Aichi–Nagoya	Team
Asian Championships
Gold medal – first place	2026 Islamabad	Team
Gold medal – first place	2014 Hong Kong	Team
Gold medal – first place	2012 Kuwait City	Team
Silver medal – second place	2025 Kuala Lumpur	Doubles
Silver medal – second place	2026 Kuching	Doubles
Bronze medal – third place	2024 Dalian	Team

Nasir Iqbal (Urdu: ناصر اقبال; born 1 April 1994, in Bannu) is a professional squash player who represents Pakistan. Iqbal had a three-year hiatus from the professional tour between 2017 and 2020, following a doping violation at the 2016 South Asian Games, where he was stripped of his gold medal in the singles event.
