= Hong Kong women's national squash team =

Hong Kong
- Coach: Dick Leung
- Association: Hong Kong Squash
- Colors: Red

World Team Championships
- First year: 1985
- Titles: 0
- Runners-up: 0
- Best finish: 3rd
- Entries: 15

Asian Team Championships
- Titles: 5
- Runners-up: 9
- Best finish: 1st
- Entries: 17

The Hong Kong women's national squash team represents Hong Kong in international squash team competitions, and is governed by Hong Kong Squash.

Since 1985, Hong Kong has won a bronze medal in 2016.

== Current team ==
- Chan Sin Yuk
- Ho Tze Lok
- Lee Ka Yi
- Tong Tsz Wing
- Cheng Nga Ching
- Fung Ching Hei, Heylie
- Helen Tang

== Former players ==
- Rebecca Chiu
- Mak Pui Hin, Christina
- Ng Jia Yunn Elise
- Annie Au
- Joey Chan
- Chan Pui Hei, Pansy
- Ho Ka Po
- Liu Tsz Ling
- Chu Man Yee Vanessa

== Results ==
=== World Team Squash Championships ===
Year	Result	Position	W	L
(England) Birmingham 1979	Did not present			
(Canada) Toronto 1981	Did not present			
(Australia) Perth 1983	Did not present			
(Republic of Ireland) Dublin 1985	Group Stage	10th	3	3
(New Zealand) Auckland 1987	Did not present			
(Netherlands) Warmond 1989	Did not present			
(Australia) Sydney 1990	Group Stage	14th	3	3
(Canada) Vancouver 1992	Did not present			
(England) Guernsey 1994	Did not present			
(Malaysia) Petaling Jaya 1996	Group Stage	14th	2	4
(Germany) Stuttgart 1998	Group Stage	18th	3	4
(England) Sheffield 2000	Round of 16	10th	4	3
(Denmark) Odense 2002	Group Stage	11th	4	3
(Netherlands) Amsterdam 2004	Group Stage	11th	4	3
(Canada) Edmonton 2006	Group Stage	9th	5	2
(Egypt) Cairo 2008	Quarter Final	8th	3	4
(New Zealand) Palmerston North 2010	Group Stage	12th	2	4
(France) Nîmes 2012	Quarter Final	8th	4	3
(Canada) Niagara-on-the-Lake 2014	Semi Final	4th	5	2
(France) Issy-les-Moulineaux 2016	Semi Final	3rd	4	2
(China) Dalian 2018	Semi Final	3rd	3	2
(Egypt) Cairo 2022	Quarter Final	5th	5	1
Total	15/22	x0 - x0 - x2	54	43

=== Asian Squash Team Championships ===
Year	Result	Position
(Pakistan) Karachi 1981	Did not present	
(Jordan) Amman 1984	Did not present	
(Malaysia) Kuala Lumpur 1986	Champions	1st
Kuwait City 1988	Final	2nd
(India) Kolkata 1990	Final	2nd
(Pakistan) Peshawar 1992	Did not present	
(Malaysia) Kuala Lumpur 1994	Semi Final	4th
(Jordan) Amman 1996	Final	2nd
(Malaysia) Kuala Lumpur 1998	Semi Final	3rd
Hong Kong 2000	Champions	1st
(Malaysia) Kuala Lumpur 2002	Semi Final	3rd
(Malaysia) Kuala Lumpur 2004	Final	2nd
(Chinese Taipei) Taiwan 2006	Final	2nd
Kuwait City 2008	Final	2nd
(India) Chennai 2010	Champions	1st
Kuwait City 2012	Final	2nd
Hong Kong 2014	Final	2nd
(Chinese Taipei) Taiwan 2016	Semi Final	3rd
(South Korea) Cheongju 2018	Champions	1st
(Malaysia) Kuala Lumpur 2021	Final	2nd
(South Korea) Cheongju 2022	Champions	1st
Total	x5 - x9 - x3	

== See also ==
- Hong Kong Squash
- World Team Squash Championships
- Hong Kong men's national squash team
