= Lee Ka Yi =

Hong Kong squash player (born 1993)

Lee Ka Yi MH
Personal information
- Born: November 25, 1993 (age 32) Hong Kong

Sport
- Country: Hong Kong
- Handedness: Right Handed
- Coached by: Rebecca Chiu Wing Yin
- Retired: Active
- Racquet used: Prince

Women's singles
- Highest ranking: No. 32 (24 March 2025)
- Current ranking: No. 33 (14 July 2025)
- Title: 1
- Tour final: 2
Medal record
Women's squash
Representing Hong Kong
World Team Championships
Bronze medal – third place	2018 Dalian	Team
World Cup
Silver medal – second place	2025 Chennai	Team
Asian Games
Gold medal – first place	2018 Jakarta	Team
Gold medal – first place	2026 Aichi–Nagoya	Mixed doubles
Silver medal – second place	2022 Hangzhou	Team
- Updated on February, 2018

Lee Ka Yi MH (born 25 November 1993), is a Hong Kong professional squash player. As of December 2022, she was ranked number 43 in the world.

== Career ==
She has competed in many professional PSA World Tour and PSA World Series tournaments. She was chosen player of the month by the WSA in August 2015.

In 2018, she was part of the Hong Kong team that won the bronze medal at the 2018 Women's World Team Squash Championships.
