= Amina Orfi =

Egyptian squash player (born 2007)

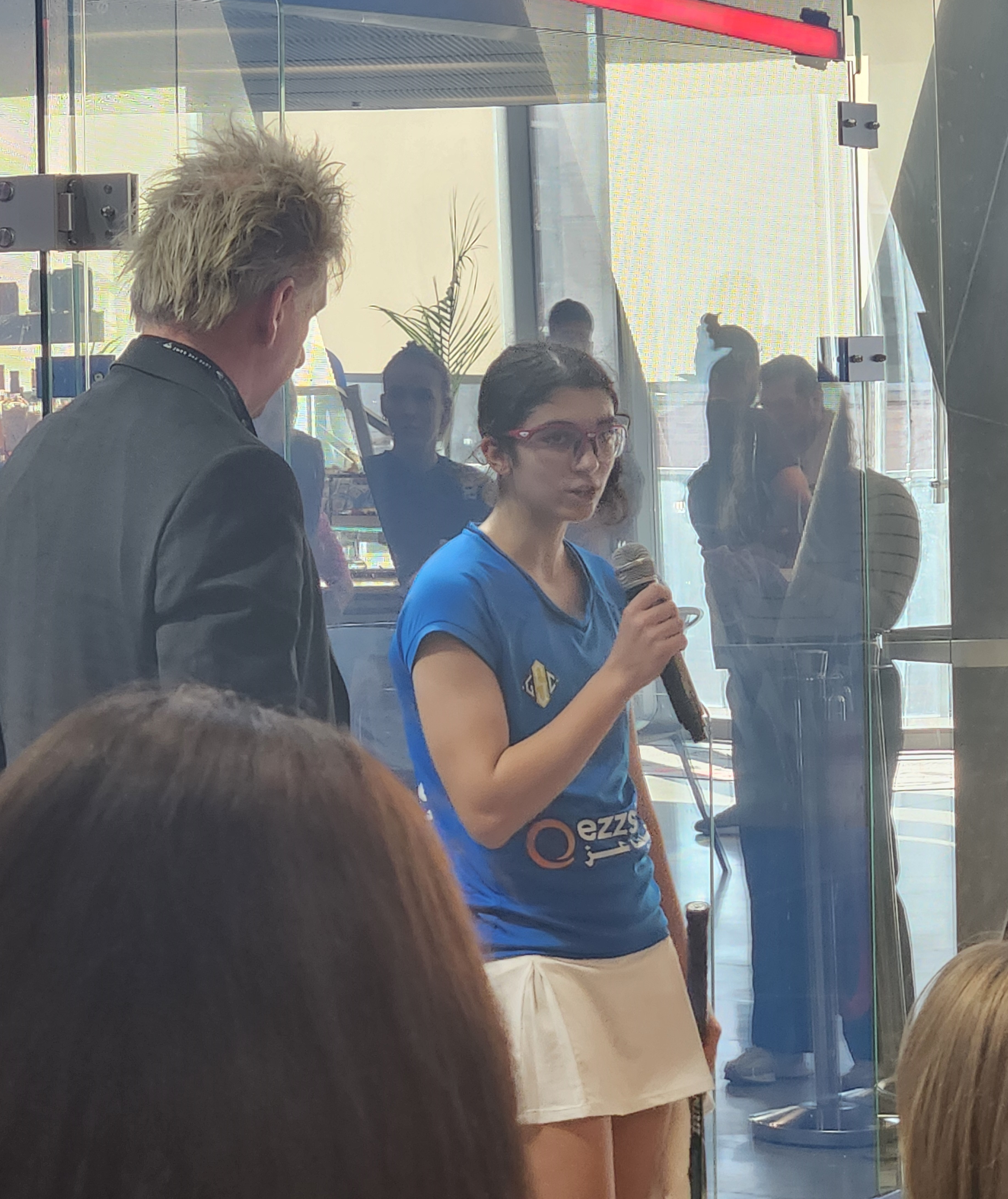

Personal information
- Born: 29 June 2007 (age 19) Cairo, Egypt
- Height: 167 cm (5 ft 6 in)
- Weight: 55 kg (121 lb)

Sport
- Country: Egyptian
- Turned pro: 2022
- Racquet used: Dunlop

Women's singles
- Highest ranking: No.2 (January 2026)
- Current ranking: No. 2 (January 2026)
- Title: 11
- PSA Profile
Medal record
Women's squash
Representing Egypt
World Championships
Gold medal – first place	2026 Giza	singles
World Team Championships
Gold medal – first place	2024 Hong Kong	Team
World Junior Championships
Gold medal – first place	2022 Maxeville	singles
Gold medal – first place	2023 Melbourne	singles
Gold medal – first place	2024 Houston	singles
Gold medal – first place	2025 New Cairo	singles

Amina Orfi (born 29 June 2007) is an Egyptian professional squash player. In 2026 she won the World individual championship and achieved her career-high PSA ranking of World No. 2 in January of that year.

== Career ==
Orfi won the World Junior Championships 2022 (under 19), held in Nancy, France, and has won four British Junior Open championship age titles between 2018 and 2023.

As the 11th seed, she reached the third round at the 2024 PSA Women's World Squash Championship in May, losing out to Nour El Sherbini. In 2024, Orfi won her 6th PSA title after securing victory in the Singapore Open during the 2024–25 PSA Squash Tour.

In December 2024, Orfi helped Egypt win their fourth consecutive title at the 2024 Women's World Team Squash Championships.

In March 2025, Orfi won her 7th PSA title after securing victory in the New Zealand Open during the 2024–25 PSA Squash Tour. She won her 8th PSA title in September after winning the London Classic.

In October 2025, she won her ninth title, the Canadian Open, during the 2025–26 PSA Squash Tour. This was quickly followed by success in the China Open for title number 10.

In January 2026, she won an 11th PSA title and reached a career high world ranking of 2. Later that year Orfi became world champion after winning the 2026 World Championship, defeating defending champion Nour El Sherbini in the final.
