= Malaysia women's national squash team =

Malaysia
- Coach: Ajaz Azmat
- Association: Squash Racquets Association Of Malaysia
- Colors: Black & Yellow

World Team Championships
- First year: 1990
- Titles: 0
- Runners-up: 1
- Best finish: 2nd
- Entries: 16

The Malaysia women's national squash team represents Malaysia in international squash team competitions, and is governed by Squash Racquets Association Of Malaysia.

Since 1990, Malaysia has participated in one finals of the World Squash Team Open, in 2014.

== Current team ==
- Rachel Arnold
- Sivasangari Subramaniam
- Aifa Azman
- Aira Azman

== Results ==
=== World Team Squash Championships ===
| Year | Result | Position | W | L |
|---|---|---|---|---|
| (England) Birmingham 1979 | Did not present | | | |
| (Canada) Toronto 1981 | Did not present | | | |
| (Australia) Perth 1983 | Did not present | | | |
| (Republic of Ireland) Dublin 1985 | Did not present | | | |
| (New Zealand) Auckland 1987 | Did not present | | | |
| (Netherlands) Warmond 1989 | Did not present | | | |
| (Australia) Sydney 1990 | Group Stage | 16th | 1 | 6 |
| (Canada) Vancouver 1992 | Group Stage | 14th | 2 | 5 |
| (England) Guernsey 1994 | Group Stage | 18th | 0 | 6 |
| (Malaysia) Petaling Jaya 1996 | Group Stage | 17th | 3 | 3 |
| (Germany) Stuttgart 1998 | Did not present | | | |
| (England) Sheffield 2000 | Round of 16 | 12th | 2 | 5 |
| (Denmark) Odense 2002 | Quarter Final | 7th | 3 | 3 |
| (Netherlands) Amsterdam 2004 | Quarter Final | 5th | 4 | 2 |
| (Canada) Edmonton 2006 | Semi Final | 3rd | 5 | 1 |
| (Egypt) Cairo 2008 | Semi Final | 3rd | 5 | 1 |
| (New Zealand) Palmerston North 2010 | Semi Final | 3rd | 4 | 2 |
| (France) Nîmes 2012 | Semi Final | 3rd | 6 | 1 |
| (Canada) Niagara-on-the-Lake 2014 | Final | 2nd | 6 | 1 |
| (France) Issy-les-Moulineaux 2016 | Quarter Final | 6th | 4 | 2 |
| (China) Dalian 2018 | Quarter Final | 6th | 4 | 2 |
| (Egypt) Cairo 2022 | Semi Final | 3rd | 4 | 2 |
| Hong Kong 2024 | Semi Final | 3rd | 5 | 1 |
| Total | 16/23 | 0 Title | 58 | 43 |

== See also ==
- Squash Racquets Association Of Malaysia
- World Team Squash Championships
- Malaysia men's national squash team
