= Asian Squash Championships =

Events

- Asian Individual Squash Championships
- Asian Doubles Squash Championships
- Asian Team Squash Championships
