= Asian Individual Squash Championships =

Asian Squash Championships

Details
- Event name: Asian Championship
- Website; Asian Squash

Winners
- Men's: (Hong Kong) Lau Tsz Kwan
- Women's: (Hong Kong) Ho Tze Lok

Asian Individual Squash Championships are the event which serves as the Asian championship for individual squash players. It is organised by the Asian Squash Federation and was held in 1981 for the first time.

== Men's championship ==
| Year | Champions | Runners-up | Location |
|---|---|---|---|
| 2025 | (Hong Kong) Lau Tsz Kwan | (Qatar) Abdulla Al-Tamimi | (Malaysia) Kuala Lumpur |
| 2023 | (Malaysia) Ng Eain Yow | (India) Velavan Senthilkumar | Hong Kong |
| 2021 | (Malaysia) Ng Eain Yow | (Hong Kong) Yip Tsz Fung | (Pakistan) Islamabad |
| 2019 | (India) Saurav Ghosal | (Hong Kong) Leo Au | (Malaysia) Kuala Lumpur |
| 2017 | (Hong Kong) Max Lee | (India) Saurav Ghosal | (India) Chennai |
| 2015 | (Hong Kong) Leo Au | (Kuwait) Abdullah Al Muzayen | Kuwait City |
| 2013 | (Pakistan) Aamir Atlas Khan | (Kuwait) Abdullah Al Muzayen | (Pakistan) Islamabad |
| 2011 | (Malaysia) Mohd Nafiizwan Adnan | (Malaysia) Ong Beng Hee | (Malaysia) Penang |
| 2010 | (Malaysia) Mohd Azlan Iskandar | (Pakistan) Aamir Atlas Khan | (India) Chennai |
| 2008 | (Malaysia) Mohd Azlan Iskandar | (Malaysia) Ong Beng Hee | Kuwait City |
| 2006 | (Malaysia) Ong Beng Hee | (Malaysia) Mohd Azlan Iskandar | (Taiwan) Taipei |
| 2004 | (Malaysia) Ong Beng Hee | (Pakistan) Mansoor Zaman | (Malaysia) Kuala Lumpur |
| 2002 | (Malaysia) Ong Beng Hee | (Pakistan) Mansoor Zaman | (Malaysia) Kuala Lumpur |
| 2000 | (Malaysia) Ong Beng Hee | (Pakistan) Mansoor Zaman | Hong Kong |
| 1998 | (Pakistan) Zarak Jahan Khan | (Malaysia) Kenneth Low | (Malaysia) Kuala Lumpur |
| 1996 | (Pakistan) Mir Zaman Gul | (Hong Kong) Abdul Faheem Khan | (Jordan) Amman |
| 1994 | (Pakistan) Zarak Jahan Khan | (Pakistan) Mir Zaman Gul | (Malaysia) Kuala Lumpur |
| 1992 | (Hong Kong) Abdul Faheem Khan | (Pakistan) Zubair Jahan Khan | (Pakistan) Peshawar |
| 1990 | (Pakistan) Mir Zaman Gul | (Pakistan) Farhan Samiullah | (India) Kolkata |
| 1988 | (Pakistan) Jahangir Khan | (Pakistan) Umar Hayat Khan | Kuwait City |
| 1986 | (Pakistan) Qamar Zaman | (Pakistan) Umar Hayat Khan | (Malaysia) Kuala Lumpur |
| 1984 | (Pakistan) Qamar Zaman | (Pakistan) Maqsood Ahmed | (Jordan) Amman |
| 1981 | (Pakistan) Jahangir Khan | (Pakistan) Qamar Zaman | (Pakistan) Karachi |

== Women's championship ==
| Year | Champions | Runners-up | Location |
|---|---|---|---|
| 2025 | (Hong Kong) Ho Tze Lok | (Malaysia) Rachel Arnold | (Malaysia) Kuala Lumpur |
| 2023 | (Hong Kong) Chan Sin Yuk | (Malaysia) Sivasangari Subramaniam | Hong Kong |
| 2021 | (Hong Kong) Tong Tsz Wing | (Malaysia) Rachel Arnold | (Pakistan) Islamabad |
| 2019 | (India) Joshna Chinappa | (Hong Kong) Annie Au | (Malaysia) Kuala Lumpur |
| 2017 | (India) Joshna Chinappa | (India) Dipika Pallikal | (India) Chennai |
| 2015 | (Malaysia) Nicol David | (Hong Kong) Annie Au | Kuwait City |
| 2013 | (Hong Kong) Annie Au | (Malaysia) Low Wee Wern | (Pakistan) Islamabad |
| 2011 | (Malaysia) Nicol David | (Hong Kong) Annie Au | (Malaysia) Penang |
| 2010 | (Malaysia) Nicol David | (Hong Kong) Rebecca Chiu | (India) Chennai |
| 2008 | (Malaysia) Nicol David | (Hong Kong) Rebecca Chiu | Kuwait City |
| 2006 | (Malaysia) Nicol David | (Hong Kong) Rebecca Chiu | (Taiwan) Taipei |
| 2004 | (Malaysia) Nicol David | (Malaysia) Sharon Wee | (Malaysia) Kuala Lumpur |
| 2002 | (Malaysia) Nicol David | (Hong Kong) Rebecca Chiu | (Malaysia) Kuala Lumpur |
| 2000 | (Malaysia) Nicol David | (Hong Kong) Rebecca Chiu | Hong Kong |
| 1998 | (Malaysia) Nicol David | (Malaysia) Sandra Wu | (Malaysia) Kuala Lumpur |
| 1996 | (Malaysia) Leong Siu Lynn | (India) Misha Grewal | (Jordan) Amman |
| 1994 | (Singapore) Mah Li Lian | (Malaysia) Sandra Wu | (Malaysia) Kuala Lumpur |
| 1992 | (Singapore) Mah Li Lian | (Malaysia) Sandra Wu | (Pakistan) Peshawar |
| 1990 | (Singapore) Mah Li Lian | (Hong Kong) Dawn Olsen | (India) Kolkata |
| 1988 | (Singapore) Mah Li Lian | (Hong Kong) Dawn Olsen | Kuwait City |
| 1986 | (Hong Kong) Julie Hawkes | (Hong Kong) Teresa Brooke | (Malaysia) Kuala Lumpur |

== Statistics ==
=== Men ===
| 4 | (Malaysia) Ong Beng Hee |

| 2 | (Pakistan) Qamar Zaman |

| 2 | (Pakistan) Jahangir Khan |

| 2 | (Pakistan) Mir Zaman Gul |

| 2 | (Pakistan) Zarak Jahan Khan |

| 2 | (Malaysia) Mohd Azlan Iskandar |

| 2 | (Malaysia) Ng Eain Yow |

| 1 | (Hong Kong) Abdul Faheem Khan |

| 1 | (Malaysia) Mohd Nafiizwan Adnan |

| 1 | (Pakistan) Aamir Atlas Khan |

| 1 | (Hong Kong) Leo Au |

| 1 | (Hong Kong) Max Lee |

| 1 | (India) Saurav Ghosal |

| 1 | (Hong Kong) Lau Tsz Kwan |

=== Women ===
| 9 | (Malaysia) Nicol David |

| 4 | (Singapore) Mah Li Lian |

| 2 | (India) Joshna Chinappa |

| 1 | (Hong Kong) Julie Hawkes |

| 1 | (Malaysia) Leong Siu Lynn |

| 1 | (Hong Kong) Annie Au |

| 1 | (Hong Kong) Tong Tsz Wing |

| 1 | (Hong Kong) Chan Sin Yuk |

| 1 | (Hong Kong) Ho Tze Lok |

=== By country ===
| 18 | Malaysia |

| 9 | Pakistan |

| 9 | Hong Kong |

| 4 | Singapore |

| 3 | India |

== See also ==
- Asian Squash Federation
- Asian Team Squash Championships
- Asian Doubles Squash Championships
- World Team Squash Championships
- World Squash Championships
