= Risa Sugimoto =

Japanese squash player (born 1994)

Personal information
- Born: 1 August 1994 (age 32) Shiga Prefecture, Tokyo, Japan
- Years active: 1994-present

Sport
- Country: Japan
- Turned pro: 2017
- Racquet used: Head
- Highest ranking: 127 (January 2018)
- Current ranking: 152 (October 2019)
Medal record
Women's squash
Representing Japan
Asian Games
Bronze medal – third place	2018 Jakarta	Team
- Updated on 1 October 1994

Risa Sugimoto (杉本 梨沙, Sugimoto Risa; born 1 August 1994) is a Japanese female professional squash player who represents Japan women's national squash team internationally. She achieved her career-highest PSA ranking of World No. 127 in January 2018 during the 2017-18 PSA World Tour.

== Career ==
She entered the Professional Squash Association in 2017 and competed in the Nissan Open Championships as a part of the 2016-17 PSA World Tour. Her best result at a PSA World Tour came at the Greater Bendigo International Open 2019 which was part of the 2019–20 PSA World Tour where she reached quarterfinals of the event and lost to Australia's Sarah Cardwell.

She was part of the Japanese squad which competed at the Women's World Team Championships in 2012, 2016 and in 2018. Risa also represented Japan at the 2018 Asian Games, making her Asian Games debut appearance and claimed a bronze medal with the team in the women's team event at the 2018 Asian Games along with Misaki Kobayashi and Satomi Watanabe. At the 2019 Women's Asian Individual Squash Championships, she progressed to round two of the event and lost to Malaysia's Wen Li Lai.
