= Japan women's national squash team =

Japan
- Coach: Yoshihiro Watanabe
- Association: Japan Squash Association
- Colors: White

World Team Championships
- First year: 1987
- Titles: 0
- Runners-up: 0
- Best finish: 12th
- Entries: 12

The Japan women's national squash team represents Japan in international squash team competitions, and is governed by the Japan Squash Association.

== Current team ==
- Misaki Kobayashi
- Satomi Watanabe
- Risa Sugimoto
- Mami Sakai
- Erisa Sano Herring

== Results ==
=== World Team Squash Championships ===
Year	Result	Position	W	L
(England) Birmingham 1979	Did not present			
(Canada) Toronto 1981	Did not present			
(Australia) Perth 1983	Did not present			
(Republic of Ireland) Dublin 1985	Did not present			
(New Zealand) Auckland 1987	Group Stage	13th	1	6
(Netherlands) Warmond 1989	Did not present			
(Australia) Sydney 1990	Did not present			
(Canada) Vancouver 1992	Group Stage	15th	4	3
(England) Guernsey 1994	Group Stage	16th	1	4
(Malaysia) Petaling Jaya 1996	Group Stage	20th	2	6
(Germany) Stuttgart 1998	Did not present			
(England) Sheffield 2000	Group Stage	20th	1	6
(Denmark) Odense 2002	Group Stage	17th	2	4
(Netherlands) Amsterdam 2004	Group Stage	19th	0	6
(Canada) Edmonton 2006	Group Stage	14th	1	5
(Egypt) Cairo 2008	Group Stage	12th	2	5
(New Zealand) Palmerston North 2010	Group Stage	14th	1	5
(France) Nîmes 2012	Group Stage	18th	3	3
(Canada) Niagara-on-the-Lake 2014	Did not present			
(France) Issy-les-Moulineaux 2016	Group Stage	11th	4	3
Total	12/20	0 Title	22	56

== See also ==
- World Team Squash Championships
- Japan men's national squash team
