= Asian Team Squash Championships =

Details
- Event name: Asian Championship
- Website; Asian Squash

Winners
- Men's: Pakistan
- Women's: Hong Kong

The Asian Team Championships are the international squash competition played between teams representing different nations organised by the Asian Squash Federation. Countries enter teams of three or four players to represent them in the championships. In each round of the competition, teams face each other in a best-of-three singles matches contest. Each competition is held once every two years since 1984, except for 2020 edition which was postponed due to the pandemic.

== Editions and results ==
=== Men's championship ===
| Year | Winners | Second place | Third Place | | Location |
|---|---|---|---|---|---|
| 2026 | Pakistan | South Korea | Hong Kong / Malaysia | | Pakistan, Islamabad |
| 2024 | Malaysia | Hong Kong | Pakistan / Japan | | China, Dalian |
| 2022 | India | Kuwait | Hong Kong / Malaysia | | South Korea, Cheongju |
| 2021 | Malaysia | India | Hong Kong / Japan | | Malaysia, Kuala Lumpur |
| 2018 | Hong Kong | Pakistan | Iran / Malaysia | | South Korea, Cheongju |
| 2016 | Pakistan | Hong Kong | India / Malaysia | | Taiwan, New Taipei City |
| 2014 | Pakistan | Malaysia | India / Kuwait | | Hong Kong, China |
| 2012 | Pakistan | India | Malaysia / Kuwait | | Kuwait, Kuwait City |
| 2010 | Pakistan | Malaysia | India | Kuwait | India, Chennai |
| 2008 | Malaysia | Kuwait | Pakistan | India | Kuwait, Kuwait City |
| 2006 | Malaysia | Pakistan | Kuwait | India | Taiwan, Taipei |
| 2004 | Pakistan | Malaysia | India | Kuwait | Malaysia, Kuala Lumpur |
| 2002 | Pakistan | Malaysia | Hong Kong | India | Malaysia, Kuala Lumpur |
| 2000 | Malaysia | Pakistan | Hong Kong | India | Hong Kong, China |
| 1998 | Pakistan | Malaysia | Hong Kong | India | Malaysia, Kuala Lumpur |
| 1996 | Pakistan | Hong Kong | Malaysia | Jordan | Jordan, Amman |
| 1994 | Pakistan | Malaysia | Hong Kong | India | Malaysia, Kuala Lumpur |
| 1992 | Pakistan | Hong Kong | Malaysia | Singapore | Pakistan, Peshawar |
| 1990 | Pakistan | Singapore | India | Kuwait | India, Kolkata |
| 1988 | Pakistan | Singapore | Malaysia | Jordan | Kuwait, Kuwait City |
| 1986 | Pakistan | Singapore | India | Malaysia | Malaysia, Kuala Lumpur |
| 1984 | Pakistan | Singapore | India | Malaysia | Jordan, Amman |
| 1981 | Pakistan | India | Singapore | Malaysia | Pakistan, Karachi |

=== Women's championship ===
| Year | Winners | Second place | Third Place | | Location |
|---|---|---|---|---|---|
| 2026 | Hong Kong | Malaysia | Iran / South Korea | | Pakistan, Islamabad |
| 2024 | Malaysia | Hong Kong | Japan / South Korea | | China, Dalian |
| 2022 | Hong Kong | Malaysia | India / South Korea | | South Korea, Cheongju |
| 2021 | Malaysia | Hong Kong | India / Japan | | Malaysia, Kuala Lumpur |
| 2018 | Hong Kong | South Korea | Malaysia / Japan | | South Korea, Cheongju |
| 2016 | Malaysia | India | Hong Kong / Japan | | Taiwan, New Taipei City |
| 2014 | Malaysia | Hong Kong | India / Japan | | Hong Kong, China |
| 2012 | India | Hong Kong | Malaysia / South Korea | | Kuwait, Kuwait City |
| 2010 | Hong Kong | India | Malaysia | South Korea | India, Chennai |
| 2008 | Malaysia | Hong Kong | Japan | South Korea | Kuwait, Kuwait City |
| 2006 | Malaysia | Hong Kong | Japan | South Korea | Taiwan, Taipei |
| 2004 | Malaysia | Hong Kong | Japan | India | Malaysia, Kuala Lumpur |
| 2002 | Malaysia | India | Hong Kong | Japan | Malaysia, Kuala Lumpur |
| 2000 | Hong Kong | Malaysia | Japan | Singapore | Hong Kong, China |
| 1998 | Malaysia | Singapore | Hong Kong | Japan | Malaysia, Kuala Lumpur |
| 1996 | Malaysia | Hong Kong | Singapore | India | Jordan, Amman |
| 1994 | Singapore | Malaysia | Japan | Hong Kong | Malaysia, Kuala Lumpur |
| 1992 | Malaysia | Singapore | India | Sri Lanka | Pakistan, Peshawar |
| 1990 | Singapore | Hong Kong | India | Malaysia | India, Kolkata |
| 1988 | Singapore | Hong Kong | Malaysia | (Bahrain) Bahrein | Kuwait, Kuwait City |
| 1986 | Hong Kong | Singapore | Japan | Malaysia | Malaysia, Kuala Lumpur |

== Medal tables ==
=== Men ===
| Rank | Nation | Gold | Silver | Bronze | Total |
|---|---|---|---|---|---|
| 1 | Pakistan | 16 | 3 | 2 | 21 |
| 2 | Malaysia | 5 | 6 | 8 | 19 |
| 3 | Hong Kong | 1 | 4 | 7 | 12 |
| 4 | India | 1 | 3 | 13 | 17 |
| 5 | Singapore | 0 | 4 | 1 | 5 |
| 6 | Kuwait | 0 | 2 | 3 | 5 |
| 7 | South Korea | 0 | 1 | 0 | 1 |
| 8 | Japan | 0 | 0 | 2 | 2 |
| 9 | Iran | 0 | 0 | 1 | 1 |
| Totals (9 entries) | | 23 | 23 | 37 | 83 |

=== Women ===
| Rank | Nation | Gold | Silver | Bronze | Total |
|---|---|---|---|---|---|
| 1 | Malaysia | 11 | 4 | 4 | 19 |
| 2 | Hong Kong | 6 | 10 | 3 | 19 |
| 3 | Singapore | 3 | 3 | 1 | 7 |
| 4 | India | 1 | 3 | 7 | 11 |
| 5 | South Korea | 0 | 1 | 4 | 5 |
| 6 | Japan | 0 | 0 | 11 | 11 |
| 7 | Iran | 0 | 0 | 1 | 1 |
| Totals (7 entries) | | 21 | 21 | 31 | 73 |

== Statistics ==
=== Titles by country ===
==== Men ====
| 16 | Pakistan |

| 5 | Malaysia |

| 1 | Hong Kong |
| 1 | India |

==== Women ====
| 11 | Malaysia |

| 5 | Hong Kong |

| 3 | Singapore |

| 1 | India |

== See also ==
- Asian Squash Federation
- Asian Individual Squash Championships
- Asian Doubles Squash Championships
- World Team Squash Championships
- World Squash Championships
