= Tong Tsz Wing =

Hong Kong squash player (born 1992)

Personal information
- Born: July 26, 1992 (age 34) Hong Kong

Sport
- Country: Hong Kong
- Handedness: Right Handed
- Turned pro: 2009
- Coached by: Tony Choi
- Retired: Active
- Racquet used: Technifibre

Women's singles
- Highest ranking: No. 37 (June 2023)
- Current ranking: No. 46 (14 July 2025)
Medal record
Women's squash
Representing Hong Kong
World Team Championships
Bronze medal – third place	2016 Issy-les-Moulineaux	Team
Asian Games
Silver medal – second place	2022 Hangzhou	Team
Bronze medal – third place	2014 Incheon	Team
Asian Championships
Gold medal – first place	2021 Islamabad	Individual
- Updated on September 2024

Tong Tsz Wing (born July 26, 1992, in Hong Kong), also known as Tsz-Wing Tong, is a professional squash player who represents Hong Kong. She reached a career-high ranking of world No. 37 in June 2023.

== Career ==
In 2016, she was part of the Hong Kong team that won the bronze medal at the 2016 Women's World Team Squash Championships in France.

In 2021, she won the gold medal at the Asian Individual Squash Championships, and became the third Hong Kong women to claim the throne.
