= Asian Junior Squash Championships =

Events

- Asian Junior Individual Squash Championships
- Asian Junior Team Squash Championships
