= Malaysia men's national squash team =

Malaysia
- Coach: Peter John Genever
- Association: Squash Racquets Association Of Malaysia
- Colors: Black & Yellow

World Team Championships
- First year: 1979
- Titles: 0
- Runners-up: 0
- Best finish: 5th
- Entries: 18

Asian Team Championships
- Titles: 4
- Runners-up: 6
- Best finish: 1st

The Malaysia men's national squash team represents Malaysia in international squash team competitions, and is governed by Squash Racquets Association Of Malaysia.

Since 1967, Malaysia has participated in six quarter finals of the World Squash Team Open.

== Current team ==
- Ng Eain Yow
- Ivan Yuen
- Addeen Idrakie
- Mohd Syafiq Kamal
- Ong Sai Hung

== Results ==
=== World Team Squash Championships ===
Year	Result	Position	W	L
(Australia) Melbourne 1967	Did not present			
(England) Birmingham 1969	Did not present			
(New Zealand) Palmerston North 1971	Did not present			
(South Africa) Johannesburg 1973	Did not present			
(England) Birmingham 1976	Did not present			
(Canada) Toronto 1977	Did not present			
(Australia) Brisbane 1979	Group Stage	12th	1	7
(Sweden) Stockholm 1981	Did not present			
(New Zealand) Auckland 1983	Group Stage	15th	2	6
(Egypt) Cairo 1985	Group Stage	17th	3	4
(England) London 1987	Group Stage	23rd	1	7
Singapore 1989	Group Stage	16th	4	4
(Finland) Helsinki 1991	Did not present			
(Pakistan) Karachi 1993	Group Stage	19th	3	2
(Egypt) Cairo 1995	Group Stage	21st	4	2
(Malaysia) Petaling Jaya 1997	Quarter Final	8th	3	3
(Egypt) Cairo 1999	Group Stage	11th	2	4
(Australia) Melbourne 2001	Quarter Final	7th	5	2
(Austria) Vienna 2003	Round of 16	14th	3	3
(Pakistan) Islamabad 2005	Quarter Final	6th	4	3
(India) Chennai 2007	Quarter Final	5th	6	1
(Denmark) Odense 2009	Round of 16	9th	5	1
(Germany) Paderborn 2011	Quarter Final	5th	6	1
(France) Mulhouse 2013	Quarter Final	8th	4	3
(Egypt) Cairo 2015	Cancelled			
(France) Marseille 2017	Round of 16	12th	3	3
(United States) Washington, D.C. 2019	Round of 16	9th	4	2
(New Zealand) Tauranga 2023	Round of 16	11th	3	3
Hong Kong 2024	Round of 16	9th	5	1
Total	20/28	0 Title	71	62

=== Asian Squash Team Championships ===
Year	Result	Position
(Pakistan) Karachi 1981	Semi Final	4th
(Jordan) Amman 1984	Semi Final	4th
(Malaysia) Kuala Lumpur 1986	Semi Final	4th
Kuwait City 1988	Semi Final	3rd
(India) Kolkata 1990	Not in the Top 4	
(Pakistan) Peshawar 1992	Semi Final	3rd
(Malaysia) Kuala Lumpur 1994	Final	2nd
(Jordan) Amman 1996	Semi Final	3rd
(Malaysia) Kuala Lumpur 1998	Final	2nd
Hong Kong 2000	Champions	1st
(Malaysia) Kuala Lumpur 2002	Final	2nd
(Malaysia) Kuala Lumpur 2004	Final	2nd
(Chinese Taipei) Taiwan 2006	Champions	1st
Kuwait City 2008	Champions	1st
(India) Chennai 2010	Final	2nd
Kuwait City 2012	Semi Final	3rd
Hong Kong 2014	Final	2nd
(Chinese Taipei) Taiwan 2016	Semi Final	4th
(South Korea) Cheongju 2018	Semi Final	3rd
(Malaysia) Kuala Lumpur 2021	Champions	1st
(South Korea) Cheongju 2022	Semi Final	3rd
Total	x4 - x6 - x7	

== See also ==
- Squash Racquets Association Of Malaysia
- World Team Squash Championships
- Malaysia women's national squash team
