= Lauren Baltayan =

French squash player (born 2007)

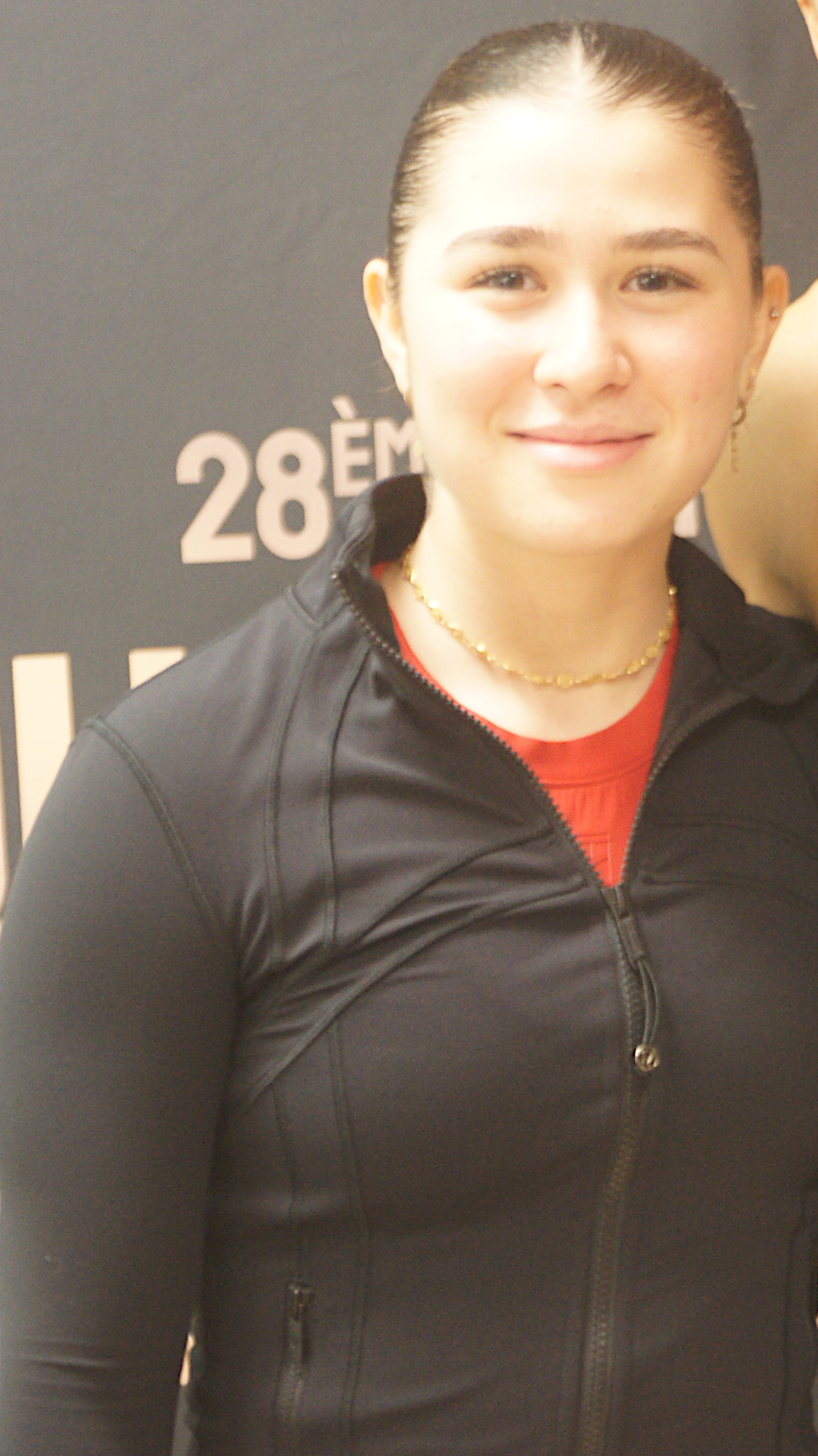

Personal information
- Born: 5 May 2007 (age 19) Cairo, Egypt
- Years active: 4
- Height: 152 cm (5 ft 0 in)
- Weight: 44 kg (97 lb)

Sport
- Country: France
- Handedness: Right handed
- Turned pro: 2023
- Coached by: Ahmed Effat
- Retired: Active

Women's singles
- Highest ranking: No. 49 (April 2026)
- Current ranking: No. 49 (April 2026)
- Title: 6

Lauren Baltayan (born 5 May 2007) is a French professional squash player. She is the 2025 European junior champion, and teams champion representing France She reached a career high ranking of 49 in the world during April 2026.

== Career ==
Baltayan was born in Egypt, where she was exposed to the squash scene, to a French mother and an Egyptian/Armenian father. At the age of 12, she was referred to as "the future of French squash" by Le Parisien. She has been on the French squash radar since the age of 11, and is known for her attacking style. She is a dual national, and has chosen to represent France.

L'Alsace called her one of the greatest attractions of an upcoming professional tournament and noted that the event would coincide with her 16th birthday.

She won the 2023 Open des Bretzels, a professional Challenger 5 level event, becoming the youngest ever European player, male or female, to ever win a professional PSA title. In her junior career she won the French and Dutch under 19 national opens. Internationally, she represents France. Playing for France, she won the 2023 European U17 championship, 2024 European mixed teams championship as well as the European individual junior championship and the team event in 2025

In October 2024, Baltayan won her 2nd PSA title after securing victory in the Open EVAE Strasbourg during the 2024–25 PSA Squash Tour. Two more titles quickly followed in April and May 2025, after winning the Edinburgh Open and the ECP Open respectively. During the 2025–26 PSA Squash Tour, she won the Open de Couzeix and the Amsterdam Challenger.
