= Satomi Watanabe =

Japanese squash player (born 1999)

Personal information
- Born: January 15, 1999 (age 27) Yokohama, Japan

Sport
- Country: Japan
- Handedness: Right Handed
- Turned pro: 2014
- Retired: Active
- Racquet used: Tecnifibre

Women's singles
- Highest ranking: No. 6 (June 2025)
- Current ranking: No. 7 (February 2026)
- Title: 11
Medal record
Women's squash
Representing Japan
World Cup
| Bronze medal – third place | 2025 Chennai | Team |
Asian Games
| Bronze medal – third place | 2018 Jakarta | Team |
| Bronze medal – third place | 2022 Hangzhou | Singles |
| Bronze medal – third place | 2026 Aichi–Nagoya | Singles |
World Games
| Gold medal – first place | 2025 Chengdu | Singles |

Satomi Watanabe (渡邉 聡美, Watanabe Satomi; born 15 January 1999) is a Japanese professional squash player. She reached a career high ranking of number 6 in the world during June 2025.

== Early life ==
Watanabe was born in Yokohama on January 15, 1999. She started playing squash at 8 years old, before moving to Malaysia at the age of 12 to train with top coaches there for five years.

== Career ==
Watanabe has won multiple junior and professional PSA tournaments and has represented Japan internationally.

=== All-Japan Championships ===
Watanabe won her first All-Japan championship in 2017 at just 18 years old - making her the youngest player ever to have done so. She went on to win another 4 consecutive titles, before sitting out the 2023 tournament. She then won the title once again in 2024.

=== International career ===
In 2022, she was part of the Japanese team at the 2022 Women's World Team Squash Championships and was voted the MVP for the event after winning all of her six matches.

In 2023, Watanabe became the first Japanese player to achieve a top-20 ranking in the PSA World Rankings, reaching 19th ranking after winning the Women’s Kinetic Orange Ball 30K Challenger event, played in Boynton Beach, Florida.

In January 2025, Watanabe won her 10th PSA title after securing victory in Cleveland's Squash in the Land during the 2024–25 PSA Squash Tour. She beat the 1st, 2nd, and 4th seeded players to achieve this victory.

In March 2025, Watanabe became the first Japanese player to achieve a top-10 PSA World Ranking. In August 2025, Watanabe became the first Japanese squash player to win a gold medal at the world games, after defeating France’s Marie Stephan.
