= Aifa Azman =

Malaysian squash player (born 2001)

Personal information
- Born: December 18, 2001 (age 24) Kedah, Malaysia
- Height: 5 ft 3.8 in (162 cm)
- Weight: 116 lb (53 kg)

Sport
- Country: Malaysia
- Handedness: Right handed
- Turned pro: 2014
- Coached by: Andrew Cross
- Retired: Active
- Racquet used: Dunlop
- Highest ranking: 21 (November 2022)
- Current ranking: 39 (14 July 2025)
Medal record
Women's squash
Representing Malaysia
World Team Championships
| Bronze medal – third place | 2022 Cairo | Team |
| Bronze medal – third place | 2024 Hong Kong | Team |
Commonwealth Games
| Bronze medal – third place | 2022 Birmingham | Women's doubles |
Asian Games
| Gold medal – first place | 2022 Hangzhou | Team |
| Gold medal – first place | 2026 Aichi-Nagoya | Team |
| Silver medal – second place | 2022 Hangzhou | Mixed doubles |
| Bronze medal – third place | 2018 Jakarta-Palembang | Team |

Aifa Azman (born 18 December 2001) is a Malaysian professional squash player. In November 2022, she achieved her career-high ranking of World No. 21. She was ranked world No. 35, as of September 2024.

== Career ==
Azman won the 2018 Malaysian Squash Tour II and 2021 Malaysian Open Squash Championships professional tournaments. She became the youngest Malaysian Winner on the PSA Tour.

She also competed at the 2018 Commonwealth Games which was also her maiden Commonwealth Games appearance.

In 2022, she won a bronze at the 2022 Women's World Team Squash Championships.

After a first round exit at the 2024 PSA Women's World Squash Championship in May, Azman helped Malaysia win another bronze medal at the December 2024 Women's World Team Squash Championships.
