= Aira Azman =

Malaysian squash player (born 2004)

Personal information
- Born: September 29, 2004 (age 22) Kedah, Malaysia

Sport
- Country: Malaysia
- Turned pro: 2020
- Retired: Active
- Racquet used: Dunlop

Women's singles
- Highest ranking: No. 26 (5 May 2025)
- Current ranking: No. 27 (14 July 2025)
- Title: 4
Medal record
Women's squash
Representing Malaysia
World Team Championships
Bronze medal – third place	2024 Hong Kong	Team
Asian Games
Gold medal – first place	2022 Hangzhou	Team
Gold medal – first place	2026 Aichi-Nagoya	Team
World Junior Championships
Silver medal – second place	2023 Melbourne	Singles
Silver medal – second place	2023 Melbourne	Team

Aira Azman (born 29 September 2004) is a Malaysian professional squash player. She reached a career high ranking of number 26 in the world during May 2025.

== Career ==
After reaching the second round at the 2024 PSA Women's World Squash Championship in May, Azman won her 3rd PSA title after securing victory in the Tuanku Muhriz Trophy during the 2024–25 PSA Squash Tour in August.

Azman helped Malaysia win the bronze medal at the December 2024 Women's World Team Squash Championships.

In May 2025, Azman won a fourth PSA title after winning the Bermuda Open, which propelled her to her highest world ranking to date of 26.
