= Ho Tze Lok =

Hong Kong squash player (born 1995)

Ho Tze-Lok(Tomato Ho) MH
Personal information
- Born: October 26, 1995 (age 30) Hong Kong
- Height: 164 cm (5 ft 5 in)
- Weight: 47 kg (104 lb)

Sport
- Country: Hong Kong
- Handedness: Right Handed
- Turned pro: 2016
- Coached by: Abdul Faheem Khan
- Retired: Active
- Racquet used: Prince

Women's singles
- Highest ranking: No. 21 (January 2024)
- Current ranking: No. 39
- Title: 6
- Tour final: 5
Medal record
Women's squash
Representing Hong Kong
World Team Championships
| Bronze medal – third place | 2018 Dalian | Team |
World Cup
| Silver medal – second place | 2025 Chennai | Team |
Asian Games
| Gold medal – first place | 2018 Jakarta | Team |
| Silver medal – second place | 2022 Hangzhou | Team |
Asian Championships
| Gold medal – first place | 2025 Kuala Lumpur | Individual |
- Updated on October 2024

Ho Tze-Lok MH (Chinese: 何子樂, born 26 October 1995), also known as Tomato Ho, is a Hong Kong professional squash player. As of October 2024, she was ranked number 24 in the world, and her highest-ever PSA ranking was 21 in January 2024.

== Career ==
Tze-Lok's wins include the 2017 City of Greater Bendigo International, Perrier Challenge Cup and Brisbane City Sandgate Open.

In 2018, she was part of the Hong Kong team that won the bronze medal at the 2018 Women's World Team Squash Championships.

In 2025, she captured the gold medal in the Asian Individual Squash Championships, marking consecutive three editions of the Women's championship won by three different Hong Kong players.
