= Chan Sin Yuk =

Hong Kong squash player (born 2002)

Personal information
- Nickname: Simmi
- Born: 4 July 2002 (age 24) Kowloon, Hong Kong

Sport
- Country: Hong Kong, China
- Handedness: Right Handed
- Turned pro: 2018
- Coached by: Rebecca Chiu, Peter Genever
- Retired: Active
- Racquet used: Tecnifibre

Women's singles
- Highest ranking: No. 33 (November 2022)
- Current ranking: No. 43 (November 2025)
- Title: 12
Medal record
Women's squash
Representing Hong Kong
Asian Games
Silver medal – second place	2022 Hangzhou	Singles
Silver medal – second place	2022 Hangzhou	Team
Asian Championships
Gold medal – first place	2023 Hong Kong	Individual

Chan Sin Yuk (born 4 July 2002), also known as Simmi Chan or Sin Yuk Chan, is a Hong Kong professional squash player. She reached a career high ranking of 33 in the world during November 2022. She currently plays for Columbia University in New York City.

== Career ==
In the 2022-2023 season, Simmi Chan won the St. James Women's 20K Classic, the Volkswagen Bega Open, and the Costa North Coast Open. She also won the CSA National Collegiate Individual Championships, defeating Malaysia’s Sivasangari Subramaniam 3-1 in the finals. In June 2023, Chan became the third youngest ever female player and the youngest ever Hong Kong woman to win the Asian Individual Squash Championships, again defeating Subramaniam 3-2 in the finals.

In May 2025, Chan won her 9th PSA title after securing victory in the Hyder Trophy during the 2024–25 PSA Squash Tour. In September 2025, she won her 10th PSA title after securing victory in the NASH Cup during the 2025–26 PSA Squash Tour. An 11th and 12th PSA title soon followed in quick succession with victory in the Boston Open and the Hamilton Open.
