= Akari Midorikawa =

Japanese squash player (born 2005)

Personal information
- Born: 15 August 2005 (age 21) Chiba, Japan

Sport
- Country: Japan
- Retired: Active

Women's singles
- Highest ranking: No. 89 (January 2023)
- Current ranking: No. 89 (January 2023)
- Title: 1
Medal record
Women's squash
Representing Japan
World Cup
Bronze medal – third place	2025 Chennai	Team
- Updated on January 2023

Akari Midorikawa (緑川あかり, Midorikawa Akari; born 15 August 2005 in Chiba) is a Japanese professional squash player. As of January 2023, she was ranked No. 89 in the world.

== Career ==
In July 2022, Midorikawa won the Challenger 5 level competition at the Victoria Open, held at Mulgrave Country Club in Melbourne, Australia. She beat Australia’s Maria Kalafatis, Hong Kong’s Toby Tse, South Korea's Yura Choe and Malaysia’s Yasshmita Jadiskumar. In 2022, she won three PSA Squash Tour titles.

In March 2024, Midorikawa reached the semi final of the University of the West of England's Bristol Open and was knocked out in the quarter final by Au Yeong Wai Yhann. She was also runner up at the Costa North Coast Open and the 53rd All Japan Championship. At the WSF World team Championships in 2024, she beat top-50 Canadian player Nicole Bunyan and Japan finished 9th overall.
