= Tanvi Khanna =

Indian squash player (born 1996)

Personal information
- Born: 23 July 1996 (age 30) New Delhi, India
- Education: Columbia University
- Height: 1.7 m (5 ft 7 in)
- Weight: 57 kg (126 lb)

Sport
- Country: India
- Handedness: Right-handed
- Club: Columbia Lions
- Racquet used: Head

Women's singles
- Highest ranking: 69 (September 2023)
- Current ranking: 92 (October 2025)
- Title: 4
- Tour final: 9
- PSA Profile
Medal record
Women's squash
Representing India
World Cup
Bronze medal – third place	2023 Chennai	Mixed team
Asian Games
Silver medal – second place	2018 Jakarta	Team
Bronze medal – third place	2022 Hangzhou	Team
Bronze medal – third place	2026 Aichi-Nagoya	Team
South Asian Games
Gold medal – first place	2019 Kathmandu	Singles
Gold medal – first place	2019 Kathmandu	Team
Representing IOA
Asian Youth Games
Bronze medal – third place	2013 Nanjing	Team

Tanvi Khanna (born 23 July 1996) is an Indian squash player and a member of the national team. She is a medalist at three Asian Games.

== Career ==
She made her maiden Asian Games appearance at the 2018 Asian Games representing India and clinched a silver medal in the women's team event. She also participated at the 2019 Women's Asian Individual Squash Championships and reached quarter-finals. She lost to fellow national squash player Joshna Chinappa in the quarterfinals.

Tanvi Khanna also represents Columbia Lions in Ivy League and was named first team All-Ivy League for three consecutive years from 2016 to 2018. South Asian Games 2018 Nepal Gold medallist in the individual event.

Tanvi Khanna was also part of senior women squash team for the 2023 Asian Games.

In September 2023 she became the top ranked squash player of India replacing Joshna Chinappa and in the process achieving the world ranking of 69.

Tanvi Khanna is part of Indian Women's squash team that won a team bronze at the 2022 Asian Games held in 2023 at Hangzhou, China.

== Titles ==
In 2019, Khanna claimed the sixth Bengal Open squash tournament for the women's title .

In 2021 Khanna won her first PSA Challenger Tour-10 Event at the HCL-SRFI Indian tour Chennai Leg-3 Event by defeating Sunayana Kuruvilla in finals in a five set thriller match 11–5,9-11,7-11,11-7,15-13.

In 2021 Khanna won her second PSA Challenger Tour event by defeating Sunayna Kuruvilla 7–11,7-11,9-11 at the HCL-SRFI Indian tour Noida Leg during the women's final.

Khanna won the women's North Coast Open 2023 title Championship making her current year champion for the new Costa North Coast tournament. This win gave her third PSA title in the career.

Khanna who was seeded 6th, won the HCL $9000 PSA Challenger Squash Tournament on 12 September 2025 at Otters Club defeating Egyptian Top Seed Amina El Rihany.
