= List of college squash schools =

North American sports schools

This is a list of colleges and universities in the United States and Canada that field squash as a varsity sport or a club sport and are members of the College Squash Association (CSA). There will be 34 varsity programs and 40 club teams for the 2025–26 season for men. There will be 31 varsity programs and 11 club teams for the 2025-26 season for women. Conference affiliations are current for the upcoming season. All varsity teams and most club teams compete in the annual College National Team Championships in February. The championships consist of 5 playoff divisions for club teams of 8 teams each and 4 playoff divisions for varsity teams of 8 teams each (except Potter Cup which has 12 teams) as of 2026. The top 12 teams compete for the Potter Cup while the next 8 teams compete for the Hoehn Cup. The two most prominent conferences that sponsor and have full participation in college squash are the Ivy League and the New England Small College Athletic Conference (NESCAC). Schools of every conference compete together regularly. Trinity Bantams and Harvard Crimson have dominated the top division. These two schools have combined to win 36 of the past 46 titles since 1980.

== College squash schools ==
| Team | School | City | State/Province | Program Established | Conference | Last Championship | Varsity Rank | Club Rank |
|---|---|---|---|---|---|---|---|---|
| Amherst Mammoths | Amherst College | Amherst | Massachusetts | 1938 | NESCAC | 1994 (Hoehn Cup) | 16 | |
| Arizona State Sun Devils | Arizona State University | Tempe | Arizona | 2022* | Big 12 | None | | 32 |
| Bard Raptors | Bard College | Annandale-on-Hudson | New York | 2009 | Liberty | None | 34 | |
| Bates Bobcats | Bates College | Lewiston | Maine | 1966 | NESCAC | 2008 (Hoehn Cup) | 27 | |
| Boston College Eagles | Boston College | Chestnut Hill | Massachusetts | 2005* | ACC | 2013 (Chaffee Cup) | | 2 (women's) |
| Boston University Terriers | Boston University | Boston | Massachusetts | 2008* | Patriot | 2025 (Hawthorne Cup) | | 11 |
| Bowdoin Polar Bears | Bowdoin College | Brunswick | Maine | 1969 | NESCAC | 2003 (Kurtz Cup) | 21 | |
| Brown Bears | Brown University | Providence | Rhode Island | 2021* | Ivy | 2012 (Kurtz Cup) | | 1 |
| Bucknell Bison | Bucknell University | Lewisburg | Pennsylvania | 2008* | Patriot | 2011 (Serues Cup) | | 33 |
| California Golden Bears | University of California, Berkeley | Berkeley | California | 1989* | ACC | 1993 (Summers Cup) | | 6 |
| Carnegie Mellon Tartans | Carnegie Mellon University | Pittsburgh | Pennsylvania | 2019* | UAA | None | | |
| Chatham University Cougars | Chatham University | Pittsburgh | Pennsylvania | 2018 | PAC | 2025 (Summers Cup) | 28 | |
| Chicago Maroons | University of Chicago | Chicago | Illinois | 2013* | UAA | None | | 2 |
| Clark Cougars | Clark University | Worcester | Massachusetts | 2024* | NEWMAC | None | | 38 |
| Colby Mules | Colby College | Waterville | Maine | 1971 | NESCAC | 2005 (Summers Cup) | 14 | |
| Colgate Raiders | Colgate University | Hamilton | New York | 1990* | Patriot | 2007 (Chaffee Cup) | | |
| Columbia Lions | Columbia University | New York | New York | 2010 | Ivy | 2020 (Hoehn Cup) | 7 | |
| Connecticut Camels | Connecticut College | New London | Connecticut | 1896 | NESCAC | 2014 (Conroy Cup) | 30 | |
| UConn Huskies | University of Connecticut | Storrs | Connecticut | 2022* | Big East | None | | |
| Cornell Big Red | Cornell University | Ithaca | New York | 1956 | Ivy | 2022 (Hoehn Cup) | 10 | |
| Dartmouth Big Green | Dartmouth College | Hanover | New Hampshire | 1935 | Ivy | 2017 (Hoehn Cup) | 9 | |
| Denison Big Red | Denison University | Granville | Ohio | 1994 | NCAC | 2025 (Conroy Cup) | 25 | |
| Dickinson Red Devils | Dickinson College | Carlisle | Pennsylvania | 2014 | Centennial | 2018 (Summers Cup) | 23 | |
| Drexel Dragons | Drexel University | Philadelphia | Pennsylvania | 2011 | CAA | 2016 (Hoehn Cup) | 6 | |
| Duke University | Duke University | Durham | North Carolina | 2010* | ACC | 2025 (Serues Cup) | | 16 |
| Fordham Rams | Fordham University | New York | New York | 2017 | Patriot | 1989 (Summers Cup) | 32 | |
| Franklin & Marshall Diplomats | Franklin & Marshall College | Lancaster | Pennsylvania | 1966 | Centennial | 1996 (Hoehn Cup) | 17 | |
| Georgetown Hoyas | Georgetown University | Washington | D.C. | 2006* | Big East | 2025 (Kurtz Cup) | 15 (women's) | 4 |
| Georgia Tech Yellow Jackets | Georgia Institute of Technology | Atlanta | Georgia | 2026* | ACC | None | | 8 |
| Hamilton Continentals | Hamilton College | Clinton | New York | 1986 | NESCAC | 2000 (Walker Cup) | 22 | |
| Harvard Crimson | Harvard University | Cambridge (Note: Although the academic core of the Harvard campus, including the university administration, is located in Cambridge, the school's athletic complex, including the football stadium, is within the city limits of Boston.) | Massachusetts | 1924 | Ivy | 2022 (Potter Cup) | 2 | |
| Haverford Fords | Haverford College | Haverford | Pennsylvania | 1993 | Centennial | 2026 (Conroy Cup) | 29 | |
| Hobart Statesmen | Hobart and William Smith Colleges | Geneva | New York | 1967 | Liberty | 2024 (Summers Cup) | 31 | |
| Illinois Fighting Illini | University of Illinois | Champaign | Illinois | 2024* | Big Ten | None | | |
| Indiana Hoosiers | University of Indiana | Bloomington | Indiana | 2017* | Big Ten | 2022 (Hawthorne Cup) | | 31 |
| Johns Hopkins Blue Jays | Johns Hopkins University | Baltimore | Maryland | 2009* | Centennial | 1998 (Epps Cup) | | |
| Kenyon Lords | Kenyon College | Gambier | Ohio | 2024* | NCAC | None | | |
| Maryland Terrapins | University of Maryland | College Park | Maryland | 2026 | Big Ten | None | | 30 |
| Michigan Wolverines | University of Michigan | Ann Arbor | Michigan | 2018 | Big Ten | 2020 (Serues Cup) | | 23 |
| Middlebury Panthers | Middlebury College | Middlebury | Vermont | 2007 | NESCAC | 2017 (Summers Cup) | 18 | |
| MIT Engineers | Massachusetts Institute of Technology | Cambridge | Massachusetts | 2010 | NEWMAC | 2026 (Hoehn Cup) | 13 | |
| Navy Midshipmen | United States Naval Academy | Annapolis | Maryland | 1897 | Patriot | 1967 (Potter Cup) | 15 | |
| New York University Violets | New York University | New York | New York | 2010* | UAA | 2018 (Chaffee Cup) | | |
| North Carolina Tar Heels | University of North Carolina | Chapel Hill | North Carolina | 2007* | ACC | 2008 (Emerging Teams) | | 29 |
| Northeastern Huskies | Northeastern University | Boston | Massachusetts | 2004* | CAA | 2014 (Chaffee Cup) | | 3 (women's) |
| Northwestern Wildcats | Northwestern University | Evanston | Illinois | 1998* | Big Ten | 2001 (Chaffee Cup) | | 25 |
| Notre Dame Fighting Irish | University of Notre Dame | South Bend | Indiana | 2004* | ACC | 2014 (H Division) | | 40 |
| Ohio State Buckeyes | Ohio State University | Columbus | Ohio | 2024* | Big Ten | None | | 36 |
| Penn Quakers | University of Pennsylvania | Philadelphia | Pennsylvania | 1935 | Ivy | 2024 (Potter Cup) | 3 | |
| Pittsburgh Panthers | University of Pittsburgh | Pittsburgh | Pennsylvania | 2017 | ACC | None | | 37 |
| Princeton Tigers | Princeton University | Princeton | New Jersey | 1930 | Ivy | 2012 (Potter Cup) | 8 | |
| Purdue Boilermakers | Purdue University | West Lafayette | Indiana | 2025* | Big Ten | None | | 18 |
| Rice Owls | Rice University | Houston | Texas | 2026 | AAC | None | | 28 |
| Richmond Spiders | University of Richmond | Richmond | Virginia | 2013* | A-10 | 2019 (Serues Cup) | | 34 |
| Rochester Yellowjackets | University of Rochester | Rochester | New York | 1956 | Liberty | 2024 (Hoehn Cup) | 19 | |
| SMU Mustangs | Southern Methodist University | University Park | Texas | 2026 | ACC | None | | |
| St. Lawrence Saints | St. Lawrence University | Canton | New York | 1999 | Liberty | 2008 (Summers Cup) | 24 | |
| Stanford Cardinal | Stanford University | Stanford | California | 2003 | ACC | 2015 (Kurtz Cup) | 4 (women's) | 13 |
| Texas Longhorns | University of Texas | Austin | Texas | 2026 | SEC | None | | 26 |
| Trinity Bantams | Trinity College | Hartford | Connecticut | 1941 | NESCAC | 2018 (Potter Cup) | 1 | |
| Tufts Jumbos | Tufts University | Medford | Massachusetts | 1976 | NESCAC | 2004 (Conroy Cup) | 11 | |
| UCLA Bruins | University of California-Los Angeles | Los Angeles | California | 2022* | Big Ten | None | | 7 |
| USC Trojans | University of Southern California | Los Angeles | California | 2024* | Big Ten | None | | |
| Vanderbilt Commodores | Vanderbilt University | Nashville | Tennessee | 2024* | SEC | None | | |
| Vassar Brewers | Vassar College | Poughkeepsie | New York | 1947 | Liberty | 2008 (Walker Cup) | 33 | |
| Virginia Cavaliers | University of Virginia | Charlottesville | Virginia | 2017 | ACC | 2020 (Kurtz Cup) | 5 | |
| University of Washington Huskies | University of Washington | Seattle | Washington | 2024* | Big Ten | None | | 12 |
| Washington University Bears | Washington University in St. Louis | St. Louis | Missouri | 2010* | UAA | 2026 (Epps Cup) | | 1 (women's) |
| Washington & Lee Generals | Washington & Lee University | Lexington, Virginia | Virginia | 2022* | ODAC | None | | 24 |
| Wesleyan Cardinals | Wesleyan University | Middletown | Connecticut | 1915 | NESCAC | 2025 (Walker Cup) | 26 | |
| Western Mustangs | University of Western Ontario | London | Ontario | 1951 | OUA | 2025 (Hoehn Cup) | 20 | |
| William Smith Herons | Hobart and William Smith Colleges | Geneva | New York | 1998 | Liberty | 2022 (Walker Cup) | 28 | |
| Williams Ephs | Williams College | Williamstown | Massachusetts | 1939 | NESCAC | 2004 (Hoehn Cup) | 12 | |
| Yale Bulldogs | Yale University | New Haven | Connecticut | 1920 | Ivy | 2016 (Potter Cup) | 4 | |

- - Club Team (competes against varsity teams as well)
  - - Defunct Club Teams include Wake Forest (2023), Lehigh (2023), Lafayette (2023), Swarthmore (2023), William & Mary (2022), Bryant (2022), Wisconsin (2022), Xavier (2022), Brandeis University (2019), Babson College (2018), University of Miami (2016), Penn State (2016), University of Oregon (2016), Charleston (2015), Ithaca (2015), Illinois-Springfield (2013), University of Vermont (2012), Tulane (2010), Roger Williams College (2008), Rutgers (2007), UC-Davis (2007), Air Force (2007), Utah (2005), Ohio Wesleyan (2004), Army West Point (1998)

    - - Defunct Varsity Teams include Brown University (2021), George Washington University (2021), Smith College (2015), Wellesley College (2017), Stony Brook (1994), Mount Holyoke College (2024)

Arizona

- Arizona State University

California

- Stanford University
- University of California, Berkeley
- University of California, Los Angeles
- University of Southern California

Connecticut

- Connecticut College
- Trinity College
- University of Connecticut
- Wesleyan University
- Yale University

Georgia

- Georgia Tech

Illinois

- University of Chicago
- University of Illinois
- Northwestern University

Indiana

- Purdue University
- University of Indiana
- University of Notre Dame

Maine

- Bates College
- Bowdoin College
- Colby College

Maryland

- Johns Hopkins University
- University of Maryland
- United States Naval Academy

Massachusetts

- Amherst College
- Boston College
- Boston University
- Clark University
- Harvard University
- Massachusetts Institute of Technology
- Northeastern University
- Tufts University
- Wellesley College
- Williams College

Michigan

- University of Michigan

Missouri

- Washington University in St. Louis

New Hampshire

- Dartmouth College

New Jersey

- Princeton University

New York

- Bard College
- Colgate University
- Columbia University
- Cornell University
- Fordham University
- Hamilton College
- Hobart and William Smith Colleges
- New York University
- University of Rochester
- St. Lawrence University
- Vassar College

North Carolina

- Duke University
- University of North Carolina

Ohio

- Denison University
- Kenyon College
- Ohio State University

Ontario

- University of Western Ontario

Pennsylvania

- Bucknell University
- Carnegie Mellon University
- Chatham University
- Dickinson College
- Drexel University
- Franklin & Marshall College
- Haverford College
- University of Pennsylvania
- University of Pittsburgh

Rhode Island

- Brown University

Tennessee

- Vanderbilt University

Texas

- Rice University
- University of Texas

Vermont

- Middlebury College

Virginia

- University of Richmond
- University of Virginia
- Washington & Lee University

Washington

- University of Washington

Washington, D.C.

- Georgetown University
- George Washington University

== Map ==
All college squash programs during the 2019-20 college squash season. Conferences: Brown - NESCAC, Green - Ivy League, Red - Liberty League, Steel - NEWMAC, Gold - Patriot League, Cyan - Centennial Conference, Yellow - CAA, Blue - A-10, Orange - ACC, Purple - OUA, Pink - Pac-12, Pink - NCAC, Cyan- UAA, Orange- SEC, Orange- Big Ten, Blue- Big East.
