= Ashfaq =

Ashfaq is a masculine given name of Arabic origin. Notable people with the name include:

== Given name ==
- Ashfaq Afridi (born 1987), Pakistani cricketer
- Ashfaq Ahmed (disambiguation), multiple people
- Ashfaq Hussain, (born 1951), modern Urdu poet
- Ashfaq Parvez Kayani (born 1952), current Chief of Army Staff of the Pakistan Army
- Ashfaq Munshi, entrepreneur and technology executive
- Ashfaq Majeed Wani (1966–1990), Jammu Kashmir Liberation Front militant

== Surname ==
- Ali Ashfaq (born 1985), Maldivian footballer nicknamed "Dhagandey"
- Basit Ashfaq, (born 1986), professional squash player who represented Pakistan

== See also ==
- Ashfaq Bhatti, Urdu-English slasher film directed by Omar Khan
