= Penn Quakers men's squash =

American college squash team

- University: University of Pennsylvania
- First season: 1935-36
- Head coach: Gilly Lane (10th season)
- League: College Squash Association
- Conference: Ivy League
- Location: Philadelphia, Pennsylvania
- Venue: Penn Squash Center
- Rivalries: Princeton, Drexel, Harvard
- All-time record: 556–412 (.574)
- All-Americans: 25
- Nickname: Quakers
- Colors: Red and blue

National champions
- 2024, 2025

National runner-up
- 2020, 2022

Conference champions
- 1966, 1969, 1974, 2022, 2024, 2025, 2026
- Website: www.pennathletics.com/index.aspx?path=msquash

The Penn Quakers men's squash team is the intercollegiate men's squash team for University of Pennsylvania located in Philadelphia, Pennsylvania. The team competes in the Ivy League within the College Squash Association. The university first fielded a squash team in 1935. The current is head coach is former professional squash player Gilly Lane and the director is Jack Wyant.

== History ==
The Quakers enjoyed considerable success in the 60s and 70s, winning 3 Ivy League titles. In 2022, they finished the regular season undefeated at 16-0 and captured their first outright Ivy League championship since 1969.

== Year-by-year results ==
=== Men's Squash ===
Updated February 2026.

Year	Wins	Losses	Ivy League	Overall
2010–2011	6	9	6th	10th
2011–2012	8	7	6th	9th
2012–2013	5	12	7th	14th
2013–2014	8	7	4th	8th
2014–2015	9	8	5th	7th
2015–2016	11	6	5th	5th
2016–2017	9	8	4th	7th
2017–2018	11	7	4th	7th
2018–2019	14	4	2nd	3rd
2019-2020	14	3	2nd	2nd
2020-2021	Season was cancelled due to the COVID-19 pandemic			
2021-2022	18	1	1st	2nd
2022-2023	16	3	2nd	4th
2023-2024	15	2	T1st	1st
2024-2025	20	0	1st	1st
2025-2026	12	2	1st	3rd

== Players ==
=== Current roster ===
Updated February 2026.

No.	Nat	Player	Class	Started	Birthplace
4	(United States)	Alex Dartnell	Fr.	2025	Delray Beach, Florida
	(United States)	Philip Dartnell	Fr.	2025	Delray Beach, Florida
	(United States)	Henry Fogel	Fr.	2025	Rye, New York
	(United States)	Will Newman	Fr.	2025	Greenwich, Connecticut
7	(France)	Gregory Malsang	So.	2024	Haguenau, France
8	(United States)	Rehan Luthra	Gr.	2021	Kirkland, Washington
1	(Egypt)	Omar Hafez	Sr.	2022	Alexandria, Egypt
3	(Egypt)	Marwan Abdelsalam	So.	2024	Alexandria, Egypt
	(United States)	Hao Cui	Sr.	2022	Pikesville, Maryland
2	(Egypt)	Salman Khalil	Jr.	2023	Cairo, Egypt
	(Scotland)	Kyle Penman	Jr.	2023	Stirling, Scotland
	(United States)	Ben Mathias	Jr.	2023	Greenwich, Connecticut
9	(United States)	Varun Chitturi	Jr.	2023	Fremont, California
6	(United States)	Zane Patel	So.	2024	Palo Alto, California
	(Hong Kong)	Jat Tse	Jr.	2023	Kowloon, Hong Kong
5	(United States)	Rustin Wiser	So.	2024	Bronxville, New York

=== Notable former players ===
Andrew Douglas (squash player) '22, 4x 1st team All-American, 4x 1st team All-Ivy

Ned Edwards '80, 4x All-Ivy, Individual Champion

Aly Abou Eleinen '22, 3x 1st team All-American, 3x 1st team All-Ivy, Individual Tournament Finalist, #8 in the World

Nick Spizzirri '25, 3x 1st team All-American, 3x 1st team All-Ivy, 2x Potter Cup Champion, 3rd all time in wins (58)

== See also ==
- List of college squash schools
