= Dartmouth Big Green men's squash =

American college squash team

- University: Dartmouth College
- First season: 1935-36
- Head coach: Vikram Malhotra
- League: College Squash Association
- Conference: Ivy League
- Location: Hanover, New Hampshire
- Venue: Alumni Gymnasium
- Rivalries: Cornell, Columbia
- All-time record: 582–574 (.503)
- All-Americans: 14
- Nickname: Big Green
- Colors: Dartmouth green and white
- Website: www.dartmouthsports.com/SportSelect.dbml?DB_OEM_ID=11600&DB_OEM_ID=11600&SPID=4729&SPSID=48939

The Dartmouth Big Green team is the intercollegiate men's squash team for Dartmouth College located in Hanover, New Hampshire. The team competes in the Ivy League within the College Squash Association. The university first fielded a squash team in 1935. The current is head coach is former professional squash player Vikram Malhotra.

== Year-by-year results ==
=== Men's Squash ===
Updated February 2026.

Year	Wins	Losses	Ivy League	Overall
2010–2011	6	9	6th	10th
2011–2012	8	7	6th	9th
2012–2013	5	12	6th	14th
2013–2014	8	7	4th	8th
2014–2015	9	8	5th	7th
2015–2016	11	6	5th	5th
2016–2017	9	8	4th	7th
2017–2018	11	7	4th	7th
2018–2019	9	8	6th	7th
2019–2020	7	8	6th	12th
2020–2021	No Season due to COVID-19			
2021–2022	7	10	7th	11th
2022–2023	8	9	7th	10th
2023–2024	7	10	7th	10th
2024–2025	7	10	7th	11th
2025–2026	7	7	6th	9th

== Players ==
=== Current roster ===
Updated February 2026.

No.	Nat	Player	Class	Started	Birthplace
1	(United States)	Gurshan Jolly	Fr.	2025	Palo Alto, California
7	(United States)	Felix Feldman	Sr.	2022	San Francisco, California
3	(Malaysia)	Wei Yan Tho	Fr.	2025	Penang, Malaysia
2	(India)	Arihant Kalamangalan Sunil	Fr.	2025	Chennai, India
6	(United States)	Callan Venkatesan	Jr.	2023	San Francisco, California
4	(Canada)	Sam Boulanger	Fr.	2025	Calgary, Alberta
8	(India)	Rohan Ray	Sr.	2022	Bangalore, India
9	(United States)	Warren Klein	Sr.	2022	Greenwich, Connecticut
5	(United States)	Brandon Wang	So.	2024	Millburn, New Jersey
10	(India)	Ekam Singh	Jr.	2023	Chandigarh, India
	(United States)	Alec McAfee	Fr.	2025	Chicago, Illinois
	(United States)	Rana Thakkar	Sr.	2022	Atlanta, Georgia

=== Notable former players ===
Notable alumni include:

- Ryan Donegan '05, Highest world ranking of 88, 4x All-American and 4x All-Ivy
- Chris Hanson (squash player) '13, Highest world ranking of 60, 1 PSA Title, 4x All-American and 4x All-Ivy, 2013 Skillman Award Winner
