= Princeton Tigers men's squash =

Princeton University's men's squash team

- University: Princeton University
- First season: 1930-31
- Head coach: Sean Wilkinson (13th season)
- League: College Squash Association
- Conference: Ivy League
- Location: Princeton, New Jersey
- Venue: Jadwin Gymnasium
- Rivalries: Penn
- All-time record: 715–242 (.747)
- All-Americans: 59
- Nickname: Tigers
- Colors: Black and orange

National champions
- 1942, 1955, 1974, 1975, 1977, 1978, 1979, 1981, 1982, 1993, 2012

National runner-up
- 1956, 1959, 1961, 1964, 1983, 1984, 1985, 1986, 1989, 1991, 1995, 2000, 2002, 2003, 2004, 2006, 2007, 2008, 2009

Conference champions
- 1957, 1974, 1975, 1977, 1978, 1979, 1981, 1982, 1989, 2000, 2002, 2003, 2006, 2007, 2008, 2009, 2012, 2013, 2024
- Website: http://goprincetontigers.com/index.aspx?path=msquash

The Princeton Tigers men's squash team is the intercollegiate men's squash team for Princeton University located in Princeton, New Jersey. The team competes in the Ivy League within the College Squash Association. The university created a squash team in 1930. The current head coach is Sean Wilkinson.

== History ==
John Conroy, who coached for three decades (1940-69), won 180 matches and the program's first Ivy League title in 1957, and he is also an inductee in the College Squash Hall of Fame.

Both a College Hall of Fame and US Squash Hall of Fame inductee, Bob Callahan, who retired following the 2013 Ivy League championship season, won the most matches (316) and Ivy League titles (11) in program history.

Princeton's most historic victory came in 2012 national team championship final over Trinity, in which the Tigers ended a sensational 13-year winning streak for Trinity. Princeton was down 4–2 in the match and rallied to win 5–4.

- 2012 National Champion

== Year-by-year results ==
=== Men's Squash ===
Updated February 2026.

Year	Wins	Losses	Ivy League	Overall
2010–2011	12	3	2nd	3rd
2011–2012	15	1	1st	1st
2012–2013	12	3	1st (Tie)	3rd
2013–2014	8	7	5th	9th
2014–2015	8	8	5th	9th
2015–2016	4	13	7th	12th
2016–2017	6	10	6th	10th
2017–2018	9	9	4th	8th
2018–2019	7	9	3rd (Tie)	8th
2019–2020	11	6	3rd (Tie)	4th
Season cancelled due to COVID-19 pandemic
2021–2022	8	6	4th	6th
2022–2023	11	4	3rd	7th
2023–2024	10	3	1st (Tie)	3rd
2024–2025	11	2	2nd	2nd
2025–2026	6	4	2nd (Tie)	8th

== Players ==
=== Current roster ===
Updated February 2026.

No.	Nat	Player	Class	Started	Birthplace
3	(Mexico)	Federico Sosa	Sr.	2022	Quertaro, Mexico
6	(United States)	David Beeson	Sr.	2022	Riverside, Connecticut
	(United States)	Justin Rosini	Jr.	2023	Gladwyne, Pennsylvania
2	(United States)	Avi Agarwal	Sr.	2022	Monroe, New Jersey
	(United States)	Chase Greppin	So.	2024	Shaker Heights, Ohio
1	(United States)	Hollis Robertson	Jr.	2023	New York City, New York
	(United States)	Sam Fishman	Fr.	2025	New York, New York
10	(United States)	Mason Menin	Jr.	2023	New York, New York
5	(England)	Alhassan Khalil	Sr.	2022	Solihull, England
4	(Egypt)	Aly Ibrahim	So.	2024	Cairo, Egypt
10	(United States)	Andrew Glaser	So.	2024	Haverford, Pennsylvania
7	(India)	Yuvraj Wadhwani	So.	2024	Mumbai, India
8	(Hong Kong)	Justin Cheng	Fr.	2025	Hong Kong, Hong Kong
4	(United States)	Zain Ahmed	Sr.	2021	Morgan Hill, California
9	(Israel)	Yanai Ramat	Fr.	2025	Rishon LeTsiyon, Israel

=== Notable former players ===
Notable alumni include:

- Yasser El Halaby '06, Former world no. 40, 54–6 career record, 4x 1st-team All-American and 4x 1st-team All-Ivy, 4x individual national champion, widely considered to be the best ever collegiate squash player
- Todd Harrity '13, Former world no. 37, 59–10 career record, 4 PSA titles, 4x 1st-team All-American and 4x 1st-team All-Ivy, 2011 individual national champion, Skillman Award Winner
- Youssef Ibrahim '22, Current world no. 8, 43–12 career record, 6 PSA titles, 3x 1st-team All-American and 3x 1st-team All-Ivy, 2022 individual national runner up

== See also ==
- List of college squash schools
