= Yale Bulldogs men's squash =

American university squash team

- University: Yale University
- First season: 1920-21; 106 years ago
- Head coach: Lynn Leong (5th season)
- League: College Squash Association
- Conference: Ivy League
- Location: New Haven, Connecticut
- Venue: Payne Whitney Gymnasium
- Rivalries: Harvard, Trinity, Virginia
- All-Americans: 46
- Nickname: Bulldogs
- Colors: Yale blue and white

National champions
- 1943, 1947, 1948, 1949, 1950, 1952, 1953, 1958, 1961, 1962, 1989, 1990, 2016

National runner-up
- 2011

Conference champions
- 1989, 1990, 2006, 2011, 2016
- Website: yalebulldogs.com/sports/m-squash/index

The Yale Bulldogs men's squash team is the intercollegiate men's squash team for Yale University located in New Haven, Connecticut. The team competes in the Ivy League within the College Squash Association. It is the oldest squash program in the country, dating back to 1920. Since 1942, Yale has won 13 national titles, only after Harvard and Trinity. Currently at the helm since 2021 is head coach Lynn Leong.

== History ==
- 2016 National Champion

== Year-by-year results ==
=== Men's Squash ===
Updated February 2026.

Year	Wins	Loss.	Ivy League	Overall
2008–2009	16	3	2nd	5th
2010–2011	15	2	1st	2nd
2011–2012	15	3	2nd	6th
2012–2013	12	5	3rd (Tie)	4th
2013–2014	16	3	2nd	3rd
2014–2015	11	6	3rd	6th
2015–2016	15	2	1st	1st
2016–2017	8	9	3rd	8th
2017–2018	10	9	6th	10th
2018–2019	12	6	3rd (Tie)	5th
2019-2020	10	8	3rd (Tie)	7th
2020-2021	(cancelled due to COVID-19 pandemic)			
2021-2022	10	4	3rd	3rd
2022-2023	11	4	4th	3rd
2023-2024	10	4	3rd (Tie)	4th
2024-2025	10	3	3rd	2nd
2025-2026	6	4	2nd (Tie)	4th

== Players ==
=== Current roster ===
Updated February 2026.

No.	Nat	Player	Class	Started	Birthplace
4	(India)	Rohan Arya Gondi	So.	2024	Hyderabad, India
5	(United States)	Rishi Srivastava	So.	2024	Berwyn, Pennsylvania
6	(United States)	Rick Chen	So.	2024	Lansdale, Pennsylvania
7	(United States)	Oliver Velasco	Fr.	2025	Greenwich, Connecticut
	(United States)	Shaye Kirman	So.	2024	New York, New York
1	(United States)	Tad Carney	Sr.	2022	New Canaan, Connecticut
9	(Republic of Ireland)	Jack O'Flynn	Jr.	2023	Dublin, Ireland
2	(United States)	Lachlan Sutton	Jr.	2023	Cambridge, Massachusetts
3	(United States)	Arav Bhagwati	Sr.	2022	Hillsborough, California
10	(India)	Shreyas Mehta	Sr.	2022	Mumbai, India
8	(United States)	Bennett Eun	Jr.	2023	New York, New York

=== Notable former players ===
Notable alumni include:

- Julian Illingworth '06, Highest world ranking of no. 24 (highest-ranked American in PSA history), 10 PSA titles, 4x All-American and 4x All-Ivy, 9x U.S. National Champion, 2005 and 2006 Individual National Champion
- Spencer Lovejoy '20, former world no. 68, 3x 1st team All-American and 4x All-Ivy, Skillman Award Winner for best 4-year career
