= Misha Grewal =

Indian squash player (born 1970)

Personal information
- Born: 23 May 1970 (age 56) India

Sport
- Country: India
- Handedness: Right Handed
- Retired: Yes

Women's singles
- Highest ranking: No. 27 (March 1995)
- Updated on May 2018

Misha Grewal (born 23 May 1970) is an Indian former professional squash player. She reached a career-high world ranking of 27 in March 1995. She was an Indian national champion on four occasions.

She became runners-up to Malaysia's Lynn Leong in the 1996 Asian Individual Squash Championships, which was her career's best performance at the international level.
