= Tariq Afridi =

Pakistani cricketer

Tariq Afridi طارق آفریدی
Personal information
- Full name: Sahibzada Mohammad Tariq Khan Afridi
- Born: 8 October 1973 (age 53); Peshawar, North-West Frontier Province, Pakistan
- Batting: Right-handed
- Bowling: Right-arm medium
- Role: All-rounder
- Relatives: Ashfaq Afridi (brother); Shahid Afridi (brother)

Domestic team information
- Years: Team
- 1990/91: Karachi Whites
- 1999/00: Karachi Blues

Career statistics
Competition	LA	FC
Matches	2	2
Runs scored	0	30
Batting average	–	10.00
100s/50s	0/0	0/0
Top score	0*	26
Balls bowled	42	84
Wickets	0	2
Bowling average	–	23.00
5 wickets in innings	0	0
10 wickets in match	0	0
Best bowling	0/13	2/37
Catches/stumpings	0/–	1/–
- Source: ESPNcricinfo, 9 July 2022

Sahibzada Mohammad Tariq Khan Afridi (Urdu: طارق آفریدی; Pashto: طارق آفریدی; born 8 October 1973), known as Tariq Afridi, is a Pakistani cricketer.

== Early life ==
Afridi belongs to a family of Sufi pirs (teachers or spiritual masters) and his grandfather Maulana Muhammad Ilyas was a well-known spiritual figure in Bhutan Sharif, a locality in the Tirah Valley. His other grandfather, Sahibzada Abdul Baqi, was given the title Ghazi-e-Kashmir (conqueror of Kashmir) for his efforts during the Indo-Pakistani War of 1947–1948. His brother Shahid Afridi, is a former captain of the Pakistani cricket team. His other brother, Ashfaq Afridi, also played domestic cricket.

== Domestic career ==
=== List A career ===
Afridi made his List A debut for Karachi Whites against Sargodha during the 1990-91 Wills Gold Flake League on 28 December 1990. Afridi got figures of 0/13 (3 overs) and didn't bat as Karachi won by 6 wickets. Afridi played his second and final List A match against Rawalpindi on 11 January 1991. Afridi scored 0* (1) and got figures of 0/40 (4 overs). Rawalpindi won the match by 4 wickets.

=== First-class career ===
Afridi made his first-class debut for Karachi Blues against Islamabad during the 1999/00 Quaid-e-Azam Trophy on 6 November 1999. In the first innings, he scored 3 (17) and didn't bowl. The second innings did not take place. The match ended with a draw. In Afridi's second and last first-class match, he played against Peshawar on 20 November 1999. In the first innings, Tariq got figures of 2/37 (12 overs) and scored 26 (83). In the second innings, Tariq scored 1 (22) and got figures of 0/9 (2 overs). Peshawar went on to win the match by 4 wickets.
