= Lynn Leong =

Malaysian squash player

Personal information
- Full name: Leong Siu Lynn
- Born: 24 January 1981 (age 45) Terengganu

Sport
- Country: Malaysia

women's singles
- Highest ranking: 42 (September 1997)

Leong Siu Lynn, better known as Lynn Leong, (born 24 January 1981) is a retired Malaysian female professional squash player. She emerged as one of the greatest squash players to have played for Malaysia especially during her early career in the 1990s, an era where her counterpart Nicol David also gained fame. Since her retirement, she has become a squash coach in the United States.

== Biography ==
Leong Siu Lynn was born on 24 January 1981 in Terengganu and raised in her hometown Kota Baru, Kelantan. She moved to the United States in 1999 at the age of 18 for her higher education. She received her Bachelor of Arts degree in Studio Arts and photography from Trinity College, Hartford.

== Career ==
Lynn Leong started playing squash at the age of five and went on to represent Malaysia when she was 12.

She emerged as a national squash champion twice, on two consecutive occasions in 1995 and 1996 before winning the Asian Individual Squash Championships title in 1996, defeating India's Misha Grewal. She also represented Malaysia at the 1996 Women's World Team Squash Championships. In 1996, she was nominated for the prestigious national award Anugerah Sukan Negara for Sportswoman of the Year.

Her only Commonwealth Games appearance came in 1998, when the Games were held in Malaysia. Representing her country in the squash events, she failed to win a medal at the event and the Squash Racquets Association of Malaysia decided to remove her from the national side for a while.

In 1999, she returned to form and won the US Junior Open squash championships title in the U19 category. At the 1999 Women's World Junior Squash championships, she emerged as runner-up to her compatriot Nicol David in the women's individual event.

She is currently Director of Squash and head coach for both the Men's and Women's Varsity Squash Teams at Yale University.

== See also ==
- List of Trinity College (Connecticut) people
