= Ishfaq Ahmad (disambiguation) =

Ishfaq Ahmad may refer to:

- Ishfaq Ahmad Khan, Pakistani nuclear physicist
- Ishfaq Ahmad (computer scientist)
- Ishfaq Ahmed, Indian footballer
- Ishfaq Ahmed (politician), Pakistani politician

== See also ==
- Ashfaq Ahmed (disambiguation)
