= Virginia Cavaliers men's squash =

American college squash team

- University: University of Virginia
- First season: 2017
- Head coach: Mark Allen (9th season)
- League: College Squash Association, Mid-Atlantic Squash Conference
- Location: Charlottesville, Virginia
- Venue: Boar's Head Resort
- Rivalries: Franklin & Marshall College, Drexel University
- All-time record: 110–55 (.667)
- All-Americans: 7
- Nickname: Hoos
- Colors: Orange and blue

Conference champions
- 2019, 2020, 2022, 2023, 2026
- Website: virginiasports.com/sports/msquash/

The Virginia Cavaliers men's squash team is the intercollegiate men's squash team for the University of Virginia located in Charlottesville, Virginia. Founded at the University as a club sport in 2001, the team competes in the Mid-Atlantic Squash Conference within the College Squash Association. Based at the MacArthur Squash Center at Boar's Head Resort, the program is in the Power Five. Currently at the helm is head coach Mark Allen.

== Year-by-year results ==
=== Men's Squash ===
Updated March 2026.

Year	Wins	Loss.	League	Overall
2017–2018	15	8	6th	15th
2018–2019	16	7	1st	12th
2019-2020	19	5	1st	5th
2020-2021	(cancelled due to COVID-19 pandemic)			
2021-2022	13	7	1st	8rd
2022-2023	14	6	1st	6rd
2023-2024	10	10	2nd	9th
2024-2025	11	6	2nd	5th
2025-2026	11	6	1st	4th

== Players ==
=== Current roster ===
Updated February 2026.

No.	Nat	Player	Class	Started	Birthplace
	(United States)	Henry Raine	Fr.	2025	Greenwich, Connecticut
7	(Canada)	Ewan Harris	So.	2024	Toronto, Ontario
5	(Republic of Ireland)	Dylan Moran	Jr.	2023	Dublin, Ireland
9	(United States)	Nathan Rosenzweig	So.	2024	Silver Spring, Maryland
	(United States)	Isaac Mitchell	So.	2024	Baltimore, Maryland
10	(United States)	Patrick Keller	Sr.	2022	Rye, New York
1	(Colombia)	Juan Irisarri	Fr.	2025	Bogota, Colombia
6	(United States)	Oscar Okonkwo	Fr.	2025	Pittsburgh, Pennsylvania
	(United States)	Matthew Dayle	Fr.	2025	New York, New York
4	(India)	Krishna Mishra	Jr.	2023	Indore, India
2	(Colombia)	Juan Jose Torres Lara	So.	2024	Bogota, Colombia
8	(United States)	Maxwell Velazquez	Gr.	2020	Brooklyn, New York
3	(United States)	JP Tew	Sr.	2022	Cincinnati, Ohio
