= Basit Ashfaq =

Pakistani squash player (born 1986)

Personal information
- Born: 13 January 1986 (age 40) Lahore, Pakistan
- Height: 1.88 m (6 ft 2 in)

Sport
- Country: Pakistan
- Turned pro: 2004
- Coached by: Rahmat Khan
- Racquet used: Dunlop

Men's singles
- Highest ranking: No. 61 (April 2006)
- Updated on 22 December 2009

Basit Ashfaq (Urdu: باسط اشفاق; born 13 January 1986 in Lahore) is a professional squash player who represented Pakistan. He reached a career-high PSA ranking of World No. 61 in April 2006.

Basit has played for Trinity Bantams and been part of one of the biggest successes in collegiate history across all sports. The Trinity Bantams squash team won 252 consecutive team encounters, going undefeated from 1998 to 2012.
