= Cornell Big Red men's squash =

Squash (sport) team

- University: Cornell University
- First season: 1956-57; 70 years ago
- Head coach: David Palmer (10th season)
- League: College Squash Association
- Conference: Ivy League
- Location: Ithaca, New York
- Venue: Belkin International Squash Courts
- Rivalries: Columbia, Rochester, Western Ontario
- All-time record: 474–513 (.480)
- All-Americans: 13
- Nickname: Big Red
- Colors: Carnelian red and white
- Website: bigred.com/squash

The Cornell Big Red men's squash team is the intercollegiate men's squash team for Cornell University located in Ithaca, New York. The team competes in the Ivy League within the College Squash Association. The team was established in 1956. They play at the Belkin International Squash Courts at the Reis Tennis Center. The head coach is currently Australian former world number 1, David Palmer.

== History ==
Mark Devoy coached the team for 12 seasons from 2004 to 2016. He led the Big Red to be a steady presence in the top 8 nationally, with a 126-89 career record. The Big Red finished as high as 6th in the country during Devoy's tenure. However, reports began to surface from former players describing a pattern of abusive behaviour and coaching practices by Devoy. David Palmer replaced both Mark and Julee Devoy (women's head coach) before the 2016-2017 season. Palmer is the third former world number 1 currently coaching a college squash team, joining Drexel's John White and MIT's Thierry Lincou.

== Year-by-year results ==
=== Men's Squash ===
Updated February 2026.

Year	Wins	Losses	Ivy League	Overall
2010–2011	10	6	3rd	6th
2011–2012	13	7	4th	4th
2012–2013	16	6	3rd (Tie)	8th
2013–2014	10	7	3rd	6th
2014–2015	9	9	6th	11th
2015–2016	9	9	5th	10th
2016–2017	7	12	7th	12th
2017–2018	6	15	8th	16th
2018–2019	6	12	7th	13th
2019–2020	7	11	7th	10th
Season cancelled due to COVID-19 pandemic
2021–2022	9	7	5th	9th
2022–2023	8	9	5th	6th
2023-2024	11	7	5th	9th
2024-2025	7	10	6th	9th
2025-2026	4	9	7th	10th

== Players ==
=== Current roster ===
Updated February 2026.

No.	Nat	Player	Class	Started	Birthplace
5	(Canada)	Roman Bicknell	So.	2024	Vancouver, British Columbia
3	(Egypt)	Aly Ezzat	Fr.	2025	Cairo, Egypt
1	(Canada)	Syan Singh	Jr.	2023	Mississauga, Ontario
	(United States)	Sebastian Dobron	Sr.	2022	Barrington, Rhode Island
6	(United States)	Daniel King	Fr.	2025	Bethesda, Maryland
	(United States)	Kaz Malhotra	Fr.	2025	Portland, Oregon
7	(India)	Jeh Pandole	Sr.	2022	Mumbai, India
	(United States)	Grant Roshkoff	So.	2024	Haverford, Pennsylvania
8	(India)	Vivaan Shah	So.	2024	Mumbai, India
9	(Canada)	Ethan Jain	Fr.	2025	Toronto, Ontario
4	(United States)	Arnav Tevatia	Jr.	2023	San Francisco, California
	(United States)	Robert Sawyers	Gr.	2021	New York, New York
10	(India)	Vedant Chheda	Fr.	2025	Mumbai, India
2	(Egypt)	Youssef Sarhan	So.	2024	Cairo, Egypt
	(Singapore)	Edward Thng	Fr.	2025	Singapore, Singapore

=== Notable former players ===
Notable alumni include:

- Veer Chotrani '24, 4x 1st team All-American, 4x All-Ivy, Ivy League Rookie of the Year, Ivy League Player of the Year, Skillman Award, CSA Individual National Champion 2024.
