= Ashfaq Ahmed (disambiguation) =

Ashfaq Ahmed (1925–2004) was a writer, playwright and broadcaster from Pakistan.

Ashfaq Ahmed can also refer to:

- Ashfaq Ahmed (hockey player) (1946–2005), Pakistani hockey player
- Ashfaq Ahmed (cricketer, born 1973), Pakistani former Test cricketer
- Ashfaq Ahmed (cricketer, born 1987), Pakistani cricketer
- Ashfaq Ahmed (Emirati cricketer) (born 1985), Emirati cricketer

== See also ==
- Ishfaq Ahmad (disambiguation)
