= Ashfaq Afridi =

Pakistani cricketer

Ashfaq Afridi اشفاق آفریدی
Personal information
- Full name: Sahibzada Mohammad Ashfaq Khan Afridi
- Born: 25 October 1987 (age 39); Karachi, Sindh, Pakistan
- Batting: Right-handed
- Bowling: Right-arm leg spinner
- Role: Bowler
- Relatives: Shahid Afridi (brother); Tariq Afridi (brother)

Domestic team information
- Years: Team
- 2008/09: Karachi Blues

Career statistics
Competition	FC
Matches	1
Runs scored	41
Batting average	20.50
100s/50s	0/0
Top score	38
Balls bowled	30
Wickets	0
Bowling average	–
5 wickets in innings	0
10 wickets in match	0
Best bowling	0/39
Catches/stumpings	0/–
- Source: ESPNcricinfo, 9 July 2022

Sahibzada Mohammad Ashfaq Khan Afridi (Urdu: اشفاق آفریدی) (born 25 October 1987 in Karachi, Sindh), known as Ashfaq Afridi, is a Pakistani cricketer.

== Early life ==
Afridi belongs to a family of Sufi pirs (teachers or spiritual masters) and his grandfather Maulana Muhammad Ilyas was a well-known spiritual figure in Bhutan Sharif, a locality in the Tirah Valley. His other grandfather, Sahibzada Abdul Baqi, was given the title Ghazi-e-Kashmir (conqueror of Kashmir) for his efforts during the Indo-Pakistani War of 1947–1948. His brother Shahid Afridi, is a former captain of the Pakistani cricket team. Another brother, Tariq Afridi, played List A and First-class cricket.

== Domestic career ==
Afridi played his only first-class match for Karachi Blues against Abbottabad during the 2008–09 Quaid-e-Azam Trophy. In the first innings, Afridi scored 38 (37) and got figures of 0/39 (5 overs). In the second innings, Afridi scored 3 (9) and didn't bowl. Abbottabad won the match by 10 wickets.
