= Drexel Dragons men's squash =

American college squash team

- University: Drexel University
- First season: 2011-2012
- Head coach: John White (15th season)
- League: College Squash Association
- Conference: Mid-Atlantic Squash Conference
- Location: Philadelphia, Pennsylvania
- Venue: Kline & Specter Squash Center
- Rivalries: Penn, Franklin & Marshall
- All-time record: 145–120 (.547)
- All-Americans: 6
- Nickname: Dragons
- Colors: Navy blue and gold

Conference champions
- 2013, 2014, 2015, 2016, 2017, 2018, 2024, 2025
- Website: www.drexeldragons.com/index.aspx?path=msq

The Drexel Dragons men's squash team is the intercollegiate men's squash team for Drexel University located in Philadelphia, Pennsylvania. The team competes in the Mid-Atlantic Squash Conference within the College Squash Association. The university first fielded a varsity team in 2011–2012, taking in former world number 1 squash player John White as the head coach.

== History ==
Squash is an emerging sport at Drexel University, with the men's and women's varsity squash programs established in 2011. The men's club team was founded in 2005 by Drs. Evan Cyrkin and Justin Burkholder. On April 25, 2011, the Drexel Athletics Director, Dr. Eric Zillmer, announced the addition of men's and women's squash as varsity programs that will begin competing in the 2011–12 academic year. It was also announced that former world number 1 John White would lead both the men's and women's programs as head coach.

The team has strong ties through volunteer work with Squash Smarts, a Philadelphia Youth Enrichment Program, which combines the sport of squash with academic tutoring and mentoring of under-served urban youth, in order to develop self-esteem and discipline through academic, athletic, and personal achievement.

== Year-by-year results ==
=== Men's Squash ===
Updated February 2026.

Year	Wins	Losses	MASC	Overall
2011–2012	9	10	2nd	29th
2012–2013	10	12	1st	22nd
2013–2014	11	11	1st	16th
2014–2015	10	10	1st	12th
2015–2016	15	4	1st	9th
2016–2017	14	6	1st	6th
2017–2018	9	11	1st	13th
2018–2019	7	10	2nd	10th
2019–2020	10	9	3rd	8th
Season Cancelled due to COVID-19 pandemic
2021–2022	12	8	2nd	7th
2022–2023	10	8	2nd	5th
2023–2024	9	8	1st	8th
2024–2025	11	9	1st	8th
2025–2026	8	4	2nd	6th

== Players ==
=== Current roster ===
Updated February 2026.

No.	Nat	Player	Class	Started	Birthplace
9	(India)	Tavneet Mundra	So.	2024	Indore, India
	(Kuwait)	Hussain Alzaatari	So.	2024	Hawalli, Kuwait
8	(Republic of Ireland)	Sean Murphy	Jr.	2023	Dublin, Ireland
4	(Egypt)	Youssef Bastawy	Jr.	2023	Alexandria, Egypt
3	(South Africa)	Luhann Groenewald	Fr.	2025	Pretoria, South Africa
7	(Peru)	Thiago Cabrejos	So.	2024	Lima, Peru
2	(Netherlands)	Guido Lindner	Jr.	2023	Woerden, Netherlands
6	(United States)	Charlie Taylor	Jr.	2023	Maynard, Massachusetts
	(Guyana)	Shomari Wiltshire	Sr.	2022	Eccles, Guyana
	(Romania)	Dima Dumitru	So.	2024	Bucharest, Romania
	(United States)	Sean Kiernan	So.	2024	Brooklyn, New York
10	(Barbados)	Darien Benn	Sr.	2022	St. Philip, Barbados
1	(Colombia)	Nico Serna	Sr.	2022	Bogotá, Colombia
5	(Brazil)	Yuri Pelbart	Sr.	2022	São Paulo, Brazil

=== Notable former players ===
Notable alumni include:

- Bransten Ming '19, 2x All-American, 2nd most wins in team history (54)
- Matías Knudsen '23, 4x All-American, 4th most wins in team history (51)
