= Boston College Men's Squash =

The Boston College Men's Squash team was founded in 2009 and competes in the College Squash Association, a league comprising all collegiate varsity and club teams.

== History ==
In the 2011-2012 season, BC won the Chaffee Cup at National Team Championships by defeating Bucknell University, resulting in a final season ranking of #32 in the nation. In the 2012-2013 season, the team repeated as champions of the Chaffee Cup at Nationals for the second year in a row, this time by defeating Boston University. At the National Championships in February 2014, the team made it to the Chaffee Cup finals for the third season in a row and finished in second. Most recently, the team won the Squires Cup at the National College Squash Championships at Trinity College. At the time, BC Men's Squash was ranked #33 in the nation and #5 among club programs.

== Post-Season Finishes ==
| Year | Division | Result |
|---|---|---|
| 2012 | Chaffee Cup | Winners |
| 2013 | Chaffee Cup | Winners |
| 2014 | Chaffee Cup | Runners-Up |
| 2015 | Serues Cup | Winners |
