= Columbia Lions men's squash =

American college squash team

- University: Columbia University
- First season: 2010–11
- Head coach: Chris Sachvie (4th season)
- League: College Squash Association
- Conference: Ivy League
- Location: New York City, New York
- Venue: SL Green StreetSquash
- Rivalries: Cornell
- All-time record: 142–103 (.580)
- All-Americans: 7
- Nickname: Lions
- Colors: Columbia blue and white

Conference champions
- 2018
- Website: www.gocolumbialions.com/SportSelect.dbml?DB_OEM_ID=9600&SPID=78095&KEY=

The Columbia Lions men's squash team is the intercollegiate men's squash team for Columbia University located in New York City, New York. The team competes in the Ivy League within the College Squash Association. The university first fielded a varsity team in 2010, under the leadership of head coach Jacques Swanepoel.

== History ==
The Lions beat Harvard in the 2017–2018 regular season for the first time in program history with a nail-biting 5–4 victory, with the deciding match won by Osama Khalifa. They went on undefeated in Ivy League play in the regular season, earning them their very first Ivy League title.

- 2018 Ivy League Champion

== Year-by-year results ==
=== Men's Squash ===
Updated February 2026.

Year	Wins	Losses	Ivy League	Overall
2010–2011	13	5	8th	21st
2011–2012	7	11	7th	10th
2012–2013	8	10	6th	12th
2013–2014	8	7	6th	10th
2014–2015	13	4	2nd	4th
2015–2016	7	8	2nd (Tie)	8th
2016–2017	12	4	2nd	4th
2017–2018	16	2	1st	3rd
2018–2019	9	7	3rd (Tie)	6th
2019–2020	10	8	3rd (Tie)	9th
2020–2021	Season cancelled due to COVID-19 pandemic			
2021–2022	9	8	4th	6th
2022–2023	7	8	6th	9th
2023–2024	8	8	6th	7th
2024–2025	9	8	5th	7th
2025–2026	6	5	5th	7th

== Players ==
=== Current roster ===
Updated February 2026.

No.	Nat	Player	Class	Started	Birthplace
2	(India)	Shaurya Bawa	Jr.	2023	New Delhi, India
3	(England)	Franklyn Smith	Sr.	2022	Brighton, England
4	(United States)	Arhan Chandra	Jr.	2023	Sugar Land, Texas
9	(France)	Laszlo Godde	Jr.	2023	La Rochelle, France
11	(South Africa)	Adam Morkel	Sr.	2022	Cape Town, South Africa
	(India)	Paarth Ambani	Jr.	2023	Mumbai, India
5	(United States)	Ahmad Haq	Fr.	2025	Santa Clara, California
6	(United States)	Imad Athar	So.	2024	Avon, Connecticut
	(Canada)	Alexander Yuzpe	Sr.	2022	Toronto, Ontario
10	(United States)	Tommy Soltanian	Jr.	2023	Baltimore, Maryland
7	(United States)	Varun Fuloria	So.	2024	Los Altos, California
8	(China)	Shaoqian Du	Fr.	2025	Shanghai, China
	(Canada)	Faazil Khan	Fr.	2025	Oakville, Ontario
1	(England)	Yusuf Sheikh	So.	2024	London, England

=== Notable former players ===
Notable alumni include:

- Ramit Tandon '15, Current world no. 39, 4x 1st-team All-American and 4x 1st-team All-Ivy, 4 PSA titles
- Velavan Senthilkumar
- Osama Khalifa '18, 4x 1st-team All-American and 4x 1st-team All-Ivy, 2017 College Individual National Champion, Winner of Skillman Award for best 4-year career in college squash
