= Ashfaq Munshi =

- Occupations: advisor, executive

Ashfaq Munshi is an entrepreneur and technology executive. In 2012, Ashfaq served as the CTO of Yahoo! before Marissa Mayer took over as CEO. Before that he was the Interim Chief Executive Officer and President of MSC Software in 2009. Ashfaq was an advisor to Kontagent, Inc. (now Upsight, Inc.) and has served as an advisor to a variety of startups. He was also on the Dean's Leadership Council for the Division of Engineering and Applied Sciences at Harvard University.
