= Squash =

Squash most often refers to:

- Squash (sport), the high-speed racquet sport also known as squash racquets
- Squash, the fruit of vines of the genus Cucurbita

Squash may also refer to:

== Sports ==
- Squash (professional wrestling), an extremely one-sided match in professional wrestling
- Squash tennis, a game similar to squash but played with equipment more related to that of tennis

== Food and beverages ==
- Squash (drink), a drink made of concentrated fruit syrup or fructose
- Tuborg Squash, a Danish orange-flavoured soft drink

== Other uses ==
- Squash (film), an Academy Award-nominated short film about a squash game
- SquashFS, a read-only file system
- SQUASH, Squatters' Action for Secure Homes, an activist group in the United Kingdom
