= Trinity Bantams men's squash =

Trinity Bantams Men's Squash
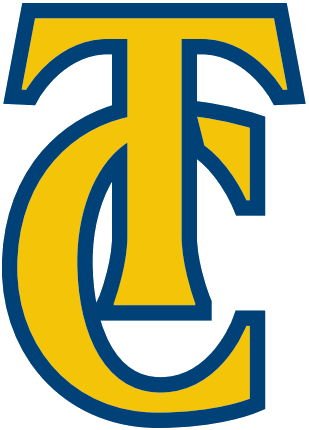
- University: Trinity College
- First season: 1941–42
- Head coach: Moustafa Hamada (3rd season)
- League: College Squash Association
- Conference: NESCAC
- Location: Hartford, Connecticut
- Venue: Kovas Squash Center
- Rivalries: Harvard, Yale
- All-time record: 831–317 (.724)
- All-Americans: 64
- Nickname: Bantams
- Colors: Blue and yellow

National champions
- 1999, 2000, 2001, 2002, 2003, 2004, 2005, 2006, 2007, 2008, 2009, 2010, 2011, 2013, 2015, 2017, 2018, 2026

National runner-up
- 2012, 2014, 2019, 2023, 2024

Conference champions
- 1999, 2000, 2001, 2002, 2003, 2004, 2005, 2006, 2007, 2008, 2009, 2010, 2011, 2012, 2013, 2014, 2015, 2016, 2017, 2018, 2019, 2020, 2022, 2023, 2024, 2025, 2026
- Website: bantamsports.com/sports/mens-squash

The Trinity Bantams Men's Squash team is the intercollegiate men's squash team for Trinity College located in Hartford, Connecticut. The team competes in the New England Small College Athletic Conference within the College Squash Association. The college first fielded a team in 1941, making it one of the oldest college squash teams in the United States. Moustafa Hamada is the current head coach.

== History ==
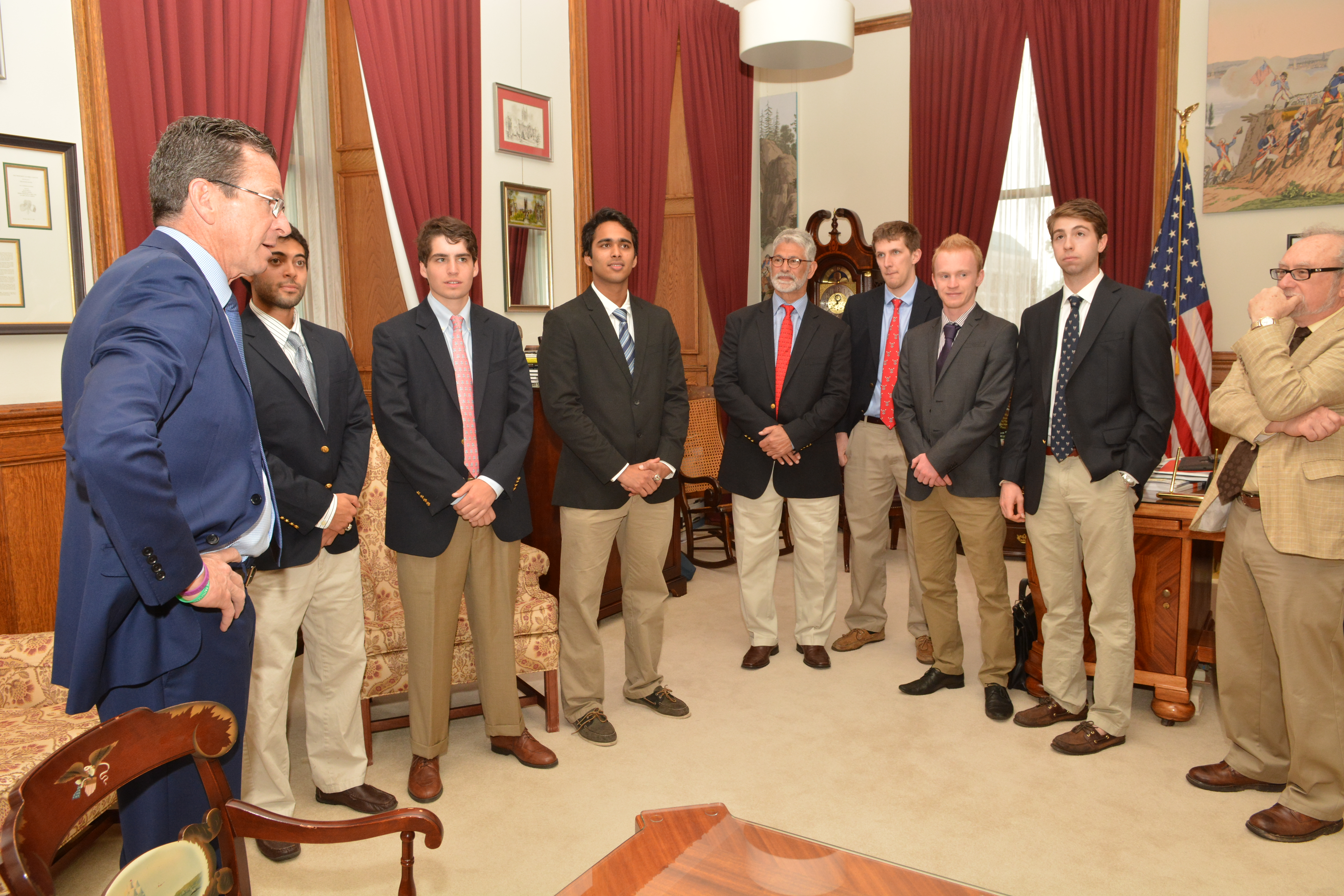
2015 National Champion team at the State Capitol in Hartford

The Trinity Bantams men's squash team holds the record for the longest unbeaten streak in any intercollegiate sport in the nation's history. On January 18, 2012, Trinity's 252-game unbeaten streak ended in a 5–4 loss to the Yale Bulldogs. The Bantams won 13 consecutive national titles from 1999, when they first took home the Potter Trophy, through 2011.

More recently, they are the 2017 and 2018 national champions.

The Bantams entered the 2023 championships seeded 6th, they went on to upset #3 Princeton and #2 Penn Before falling to Harvard in the final 5–4. For the second time in four Years, the Bantams made it to the National Championships Final under Coach Paul Assaiante.

The program has also garnered attention and praise from major media outlets such as ESPN, Sports Illustrated and USA Today, among others. They were recently ranked by ESPN as one of the top ten sports dynasties of all time.

== Year-by-year results ==
Updated February 2026.

Year	Wins	Losses	NESCAC	Overall
2010–2011	20	0	1st	1st
2011–2012	18	2	1st	2nd
2012–2013	19	0	1st	1st
2013–2014	18	2	1st	2nd
2014–2015	20	1	1st	1st
2015–2016	21	2	1st	3rd
2016–2017	19	1	1st	1st
2017–2018	20	0	1st	1st
2018–2019	16	3	1st	2nd
2019–2020	19	2	1st	3rd
(Season cancelled due to COVID-19 pandemic)
2021–2022	16	3	1st	5th
2022–2023	17	5	1st	2nd
2023–2024	19	1	1st	2nd
2024–2025	13	4	1st	3rd
2025–2026	12	0	1st	1st

== Players ==
=== Current roster ===
Updated February 2026.

No.	Nat	Player	Class	Started	Birthplace
	(Malaysia)	Andrik Lim Kai Shan	Jr.	2023	Melaka, Malaysia
1	(Malaysia)	Joachim Chuah Han Wen	Sr.	2022	Shah Alam, Malaysia
	(Hong Kong)	Zain Amjad	Fr.	2025	Hong Kong, Hong Kong
2	(Pakistan)	Muhammad Ashab Irfan	Fr.	2025	Lahore, Pakistan
	(China)	Ruiqi Wang	Fr.	2025	Hangzhou, China
9	(Egypt)	Eyad Awad	Fr.	2025	Cairo, Egypt
5	(Pakistan)	Huzaifa Ibrahim	So.	2024	Karachi, Pakistan
4	(Malaysia)	Wa-Sern Low	So.	2024	Ipoh, Malaysia
6	(Argentina)	Segundo Portabales	Fr.	2025	Mar Del Plata, Argentina
7	(Ukraine)	Dmytro Shcherbakov	Jr.	2023	Kyiv, Ukraine
	(United States)	Oliver Scott	So.	2024	New York, New York
10	(Ecuador)	Javier Romo Lopez	So.	2024	Quito, Ecuador
	(United States)	Bo Page	Jr.	2023	Wayne, Pennsylvania
3	(Hungary)	Benedek Takacs	Sr.	2022	Szatymaz, Hungary
8	(Hungary)	Daniel Simon	Sr.	2022	Budapest, Hungary
	(United States)	Lucas Alvarez	So.	2024	New Canaan, Connecticut

=== Notable former players ===
Notable alumni include:

- Basit Ashfaq '10 Former world #61, 3x 1st team All-American, 58–2 career record, 2008 and 2009 Individual Champion, 4x National Team Champion
- Mohamed Sharaf '24 2x 1st team All-American, 2nd team All-American, 2023 Individual Champion, 3x NESCAC Player of the Year
- Christopher Binnie
- Vikram Malhotra
- Juan Camilo Vargas
- Kush Kumar
- Thoboki Mohohlo
- Miko Aijanen
