= Harvard Crimson men's squash =

American college squash team

- University: Harvard University
- First season: 1924-25
- Head coach: Mike Way (15th season)
- League: College Squash Association
- Conference: Ivy League
- Location: Cambridge, Massachusetts
- Venue: Murr Center
- Rivalries: Yale, Trinity
- All-time record: 983–210 (.824)
- All-Americans: 63
- Nickname: Crimson
- Colors: Crimson, white, and black

National champions
- 1951, 1953, 1954, 1956, 1960, 1963, 1964, 1965, 1966, 1968, 1969, 1970, 1971, 1972, 1973, 1976, 1980, 1983, 1984, 1985, 1986, 1987, 1988, 1991, 1992, 1994, 1995, 1996, 1997, 1998, 2014, 2019, 2020, 2022, 2023

National runner-up
- 2013, 2017, 2018, 2026

Conference champions
- 1957, 1959, 1960, 1962, 1963, 1964, 1965, 1966, 1967, 1968, 1970, 1971, 1972, 1973, 1974, 1976, 1980, 1983, 1984, 1985, 1986, 1987, 1988, 1989, 1991, 1992, 1993, 1994, 1995, 1996, 1997, 1998, 1999, 2001, 2004, 2005, 2006, 2013, 2014, 2015, 2017, 2019, 2020, 2023
- Website: www.gocrimson.com/sports/msquash/index

The Harvard Crimson men's squash team is the intercollegiate men's squash team for Harvard University located in Cambridge, Massachusetts. The team competes in the Ivy League within the College Squash Association. It is the second oldest squash team in the country, only after Yale. The university first fielded a team in 1923, under the leadership of head coach Harry Cowles. The current head coach is Mike Way. The assistant coaches are Luke Hammond and Hameed Ahmed, while the strength and conditioning coach is Beth Zeitlin.

== History ==
- 2014, 2019, 2020, 2022, 2023 National Champion

== Year-by-year results ==
=== Men's Squash ===
Updated February 2026.

Year	Wins	Losses	Ivy League	Overall
2010–2011	9	6	4th	5th
2011–2012	16	4	3rd	3rd
2012–2013	17	3	1st (Tie)	2nd
2013–2014	18	0	1st	1st
2014–2015	10	4	1st	3rd
2015–2016	6	7	2nd (Tie)	6th
2016–2017	13	2	1st	2nd
2017–2018	13	3	2nd	2nd
2018–2019	16	0	1st	1st
2019–2020	17	0	1st	1st
2020–2021	Season cancelled due to COVID-19 pandemic			
2021–2022	15	1	2nd	1st
2022–2023	17	0	1st	1st
2023–2024	12	4	3rd	5th
2024–2025	10	7	4th	6th
2025–2026	7	3	t2nd	2nd

== Players ==
=== Current roster ===
Updated February 2026.

No.	Nat	Player	Class	Started	Birthplace
4	(United States)	Christian Capella	Fr.	2025	Tuxedo Park, New York
8	(Israel)	Segev Rome	So.	2024	Raanana, Israel
2	(Ecuador)	David Costales	Sr.	2022	Quito, Ecuador
5	(United States)	Maddox Moxham	Fr.	2025	Darien, Connecticut
1	(Republic of Ireland)	Denis Gilevskiy	Sr.	2022	Bray, Ireland
6	(England)	Alexander Broadridge	Fr.	2025	Fareham, England
9	(Malaysia)	Ishant Shah	Sr.	2022	Penang, Malaysia
7	(Canada)	Jacob Lin	Jr.	2023	Vancouver, British Columbia
	(England)	Louis Murray	Jr.	2023	Falmouth, England
10	(United States)	Marcus Lee	Jr.	2023	New York, New York
3	(Egypt)	Omar Azzam	Jr.	2023	New Cairo, Egypt
	(United States)	Andrew Chun	Fr.	2025	Rye, New York

=== Notable former players ===
Notable alumni include:

- Victor Niederhoffer, '64, U.S. Squash Champion 5× in singles and 2× in doubles, U.S. National Junior Champion, 3× 1st team All-American (freshmen did not play in that era), North American Open champion, U.S. Squash Hall of Fame, College Squash Hall of Fame, Harvard Varsity Club Hall of Fame, Pierre de Coubertin Fair Play Trophy
- Siddharth Suchde '07, Highest world ranking of 39, 4× All-American and 4× All-Ivy, 2007 Individual National Champion
- Ali Farag '14, Former world no. 1, 22 PSA titles, 3× All-American and 3× All-Ivy, 2012 and 2014 Individual National Champion, 2018 World Champion, degree in mechanical engineering
- Victor Crouin '22, Highest world ranking of 7, 3 PSA titles, 3× 1st team All-American and 3× 1st team All-Ivy, 2019 and 2022 Individual National Champion, Skillman Award winner, degree in economics
