= 2021 Men's Asian Team Squash Championships =

2021 Asian Squash Team Championships
- 20th Men's Asian Squash Team Championships
- Location: Kuala Lumpur, Malaysia
- Venue: National Squash Centre
- Date: 30 November – 4 December

Results
- Champions: Malaysia
- Runners-up: India
- Third place: Hong Kong, Japan (shared)

The 2021 Men's Asian Squash Team Championships was the 20th edition of Asian men's team championship for squash players. The event was held at National Squash Centre in Kuala Lumpur, Malaysia, from 30 November to 4 December 2021.

== Participating teams and seeds ==
1. India
2. Malaysia
3. Hong Kong
4. Pakistan
5. Japan
6. Iran

7. South Korea
8. Philippines
9. Iraq
10. Singapore
11. Sri Lanka
12. Indonesia

== Group stage ==
=== Pool A ===
Pos.	Team	Players	TP	TW	TL	MW	ML	GW	GL	PW	PL	Pts	Qualification
1	India	Saurav Ghosal, Ramit Tandon, Mahesh Mangaonkar, Velavan Senthilkumar	5	5	0	14	1	43	6	531	284	10	Semifinals
2	Japan	Ryosei Kobayashi, Tomotaka Endo, Ryūnosuke Tsukue, Naoki Hayashi	5	4	1	11	4	34	14	463	370	8	Semifinals
3	Pakistan	Tayyab Aslam, Asim Khan, Nasir Iqbal, Amaad Fareed	5	3	2	11	4	36	13	500	386	6	5th - 8th places
4	Iraq	Mohamed Ferman Hasan, Rasool Alsultani, Abdullah Alsultani, Hasanain Dakheel	5	2	3	5	10	17	33	377	474	4	5th - 8th places
5	Philippines	Robert Garcia, David Pelino, Reymark Begornia	5	1	4	4	11	15	36	389	499	2	9th - 12th places
6	Indonesia	Satria Laksana, Agung Wilant, Muhammad Tastaftyan, Ade Furkon	5	0	5	0	15	2	45	262	509	0	9th - 12th places

India
3

National Squash Complex, Grand Court
30 November 2021

Iraq
0

			1	2	3	4	5
1	(India) (Iraq)	Ramit Tandon; Rasool Alsultani	11; 9	11; 8	11; 3
2	(India) (Iraq)	Mahesh Mangaonkar; Abdullah Alsultani	11; 4	11; 2	11; 2
3	(India) (Iraq)	Velavan Senthilkumar; Hasanain Dakheel	11; 4	11; 3	11; 4

Pakistan
3

National Squash Complex, Court 2
30 November 2021

Philippines
0

			1	2	3	4	5
1	(Pakistan) (Philippines)	Tayyab Aslam; Robert Garcia	13; 11	11; 7	11; 7
2	(Pakistan) (Philippines)	Nasir Iqbal; David Pelino	12; 10	11; 8	11; 1
3	(Pakistan) (Philippines)	Amaad Fareed; Reymark Begornia	11; 8	11; 5	11; 2

Japan
3

National Squash Complex, Court 4
30 November 2021

Indonesia
0

			1	2	3	4	5
1	(Japan) (Indonesia)	Ryosei Kobayashi; Satria Laksana	11; 9	11; 4	11; 5
2	(Japan) (Indonesia)	Tomotaka Endo; Agung Wilant	11; 5	11; 8	11; 8
3	(Japan) (Indonesia)	Naoki Hayashi; Muhammad Tastaftyan	11; 1	11; 2	11; 3

India
3

National Squash Complex, Court 2
30 November 2021

Philippines
0

			1	2	3	4	5
1	(India) (Philippines)	Saurav Ghosal; Robert Garcia	11; 8	11; 8	11; 4
2	(India) (Philippines)	Mahesh Mangaonkar; David Pelino	11; 1	11; 6	11; 6
3	(India) (Philippines)	Velavan Senthilkumar; Reymark Begornia	11; 5	11; 7	11; 2

Japan
3

National Squash Complex, Court 4
30 November 2021

Iraq
0

			1	2	3	4	5
1	(Japan) (Iraq)	Ryosei Kobayashi; Mohamed Ferman Hassan	11; 7	11; 5	11; 1
2	(Japan) (Iraq)	Tomotaka Endo; Rasool Alsultani	11; 8	11; 6	11; 7
3	(Japan) (Iraq)	Ryunosuke Tsukue; Hasanain Dakheel	11; 9	11; 4	11; 7

Pakistan
3

National Squash Complex, Grand Court
30 November 2021

Indonesia
0

			1	2	3	4	5
1	(Pakistan) (Indonesia)	Tayyab Aslam; Satria Laksana	11; 6	11; 6	11; 5
2	(Pakistan) (Indonesia)	Asim Khan; Agung Wilant	11; 4	11; 9	11; 2
3	(Pakistan) (Indonesia)	Nasir Iqbal; Muhammad Tastaftyan	11; 7	11; 5	11; 1

Pakistan
3

National Squash Complex, Court 4
1 December 2021

Iraq
0

			1	2	3	4	5
1	(Pakistan) (Iraq)	Tayyab Aslam; Rasool Alsultani	11; 2	12; 10	11; 7
2	(Pakistan) (Iraq)	Nasir Iqbal; Abdullah Alsultani	11; 3	11; 6	11; 12
3	(Pakistan) (Iraq)	Amaad Fareed; Hasanain Dakheel	11; 6	11; 3	11; 7

Philippines
3

National Squash Complex, Court 2
1 December 2021

Indonesia
0

			1	2	3	4	5
1	(Philippines) (Indonesia)	Robert Garcia; Satria Laksana	4; 11	11; 7	11; 7	11; 9
2	(Philippines) (Indonesia)	David Pelino; Abdullah Alsultani	11; 5	11; 7	11; 8
3	(Philippines) (Indonesia)	Reymark Begornia; Muhammad Tastaftyan	11; 4	11; 6	11; 8

India
3

National Squash Complex, Court 1
1 December 2021

Japan
0

			1	2	3	4	5
1	(India) (Japan)	Saurav Ghosal; Ryosei Kobayashi	12; 14	11; 6	11; 4	11; 6
2	(India) (Japan)	Ramit Tandon; Tomotaka Endo	11; 4	11; 3	11; 6
3	(India) (Japan)	Mahesh Mangaonkar; Naoki Hayashi	11; 0	11; 1	12; 10

Japan
3

National Squash Complex, Court 4
1 December 2021

Philippines
0

			1	2	3	4	5
1	(Japan) (Philippines)	Ryosei Kobayashi; Robert Garcia	11; 4	8; 11	11; 8	11; 7
2	(Japan) (Philippines)	Tomotaka Endo; David Pelino	11; 6	11; 8	11; 9
3	(Japan) (Philippines)	Naoki Hayashi; Reymark Begornia	11; 4	11; 9	11; 5

Iraq
3

National Squash Complex, Court 2
1 December 2021

Indonesia
0

			1	2	3	4	5
1	(Iraq) (Indonesia)	Mohamed Ferman Hassan; Satria Laksana	11; 5	11; 9	11; 5
2	(Iraq) (Indonesia)	Rasool Alsultani; Muhammad Tastaftyan	11; 5	11; 5	10; 12	11; 7
3	(Iraq) (Indonesia)	Hasanain Dakheel; Ade Furkon	11; 5	11; 6	11; 5

India
2

National Squash Complex, Grand Court
1 December 2021

Pakistan
1

			1	2	3	4	5
1	(India) (Pakistan)	Saurav Ghosal; Tayyab Aslam	9; 11	7; 11	11; 1	11; 7	11; 8
2	(India) (Pakistan)	Ramit Tandon; Asim Khan	11; 5	11; 9	14; 12
3	(India) (Pakistan)	Mahesh Mangaonkar; Nasir Iqbal	11; 9	11; 13	8; 11	7; 11

India
3

National Squash Complex, Court 4
2 December 2021

Indonesia
0

			1	2	3	4	5
1	(India) (Indonesia)	Ramit Tandon; Satria Laksana	11; 4	11; 4	11; 3
2	(India) (Indonesia)	Mahesh Mangaonkar; Agung Wilant	11; 6	11; 4	11; 4
3	(India) (Indonesia)	Velavan Senthilkumar; Ade Furkon	11; 4	11; 2	11; 5

Japan
2

National Squash Complex, Court 1
2 December 2021

Pakistan
1

			1	2	3	4	5
1	(Japan) (Pakistan)	Ryosei Kobayashi; Tayyab Aslam	11; 6	10; 12	13; 11	11; 3
2	(Japan) (Pakistan)	Tomotaka Endo; Nasir Iqbal	9; 11	9; 11	7; 11
3	(Japan) (Pakistan)	Ryunosuke Tsukue; Amaad Fareed	12; 10	11; 7	11; 6

Iraq
2

National Squash Complex, Court 2
2 December 2021

Philippines
1

			1	2	3	4	5
1	(Iraq) (Philippines)	Mohamed Ferman Hassan; Robert Garcia	11; 5	11; 8	11; 6
2	(Iraq) (Philippines)	Rasool Alsultani; David Pelino	11; 9	8; 11	8; 11	11; 8	5; 11
3	(Iraq) (Philippines)	Hasanain Dakheel; Reymark Begornia	4; 11	11; 5	11; 5	6; 11	11; 8

=== Pool B ===
Pos.	Team	Players	TP	TW	TL	MW	ML	GW	GL	PW	PL	Pts	Qualification
1	Malaysia	Ng Eain Yow, Ivan Yuen, Mohd Syafiq Kamal, Addeen Idrakie	5	5	0	14	1	42	6	515	305	10	Semifinals
2	Hong Kong	Yip Tsz Fung, Henry Leung, Lau Tsz Kwan, Max Lee	5	4	1	12	3	37	13	517	382	8	Semifinals
3	South Korea	Yoo Jae Jin, Lee Min-woo, Woo Chang Wook, Lee Dong Min	5	3	2	9	6	31	23	510	458	6	5th - 8th places
4	Iran	Alireza Shameli, Navid Maleksabet, Sayed Ziyaekashani, Sepehr Etemadpoor	5	2	3	7	8	27	30	495	535	4	5th - 8th places
5	Sri Lanka	Methmal Wood, Shamil Wakeel, Ravindu Laksiri, Shariff Hakeem	5	1	4	2	13	8	39	314	509	2	9th - 12th places
6	Singapore	Aaron Liang, Chua Man Tong, Kojiro Tan, Jerome Aw	5	0	5	1	14	8	42	359	521	0	9th - 12th places

Malaysia
3

National Squash Complex, Court 2
30 November 2021

Singapore
0

			1	2	3	4	5
1	(Malaysia) (Singapore)	Ivan Yuen; Chua Man Tong	11; 7	11; 7	11; 2
2	(Malaysia) (Singapore)	Mohd Syafiq Kamal; Kojiro Tan	11; 3	11; 4	11; 5
3	(Malaysia) (Singapore)	Addeen Idrakie; Jerome Aw	11; 3	11; 6	11; 1

Hong Kong
2

National Squash Complex, Grand Court
30 November 2021

South Korea
1

			1	2	3	4	5
1	(Hong Kong) (South Korea)	Henry Leung; Yoo Jaejin	12; 10	14; 12	8; 11	9; 11	11; 4
2	(Hong Kong) (South Korea)	Lau Tsz Kwan; Lee Min-woo	4; 11	6; 11	8; 11
3	(Hong Kong) (South Korea)	Max Lee; Chang Wook Woo	11; 6	14; 12	11; 9

Iran
3

National Squash Complex, Court 4
30 November 2021

Sri Lanka
0

			1	2	3	4	5
1	(Iran) (Sri Lanka)	Alireza Shameli; Methmal Wood	11; 6	11; 6	11; 8
2	(Iran) (Sri Lanka)	Navid Maleksabet; Shamil Wakeel	9; 11	11; 8	11; 4	11; 7
3	(Iran) (Sri Lanka)	Sepehr Etemadpoor; Ravindu Laksiri	11; 6	11; 8	13; 11

Malaysia
3

National Squash Complex, Grand Court
30 November 2021

South Korea
0

			1	2	3	4	5
1	(Malaysia) (South Korea)	Ng Eain Yow; Yoo Jaejin	12; 10	11; 3	11; 5
2	(Malaysia) (South Korea)	Ivan Yuen; Lee Min-woo	11; 9	11; 9	10; 12	11; 8
3	(Malaysia) (South Korea)	Addeen Idrakie; Woo Chang Wook	11; 6	11; 3	11; 4

Iran
3

National Squash Complex, Court 4
30 November 2021

Singapore
0

			1	2	3	4	5
1	(Iran) (Singapore)	Alireza Shameli; Aaron Liang	11; 4	4; 11	12; 14	11; 9	12; 10
2	(Iran) (Singapore)	Sayed Ziyaekashani; Chua Man Tong	13; 11	4; 11	12; 10	11; 6
3	(Iran) (Singapore)	Sepehr Etemadpoor; Kojiro Tan	11; 9	9; 11	11; 5	11; 6

Hong Kong
3

National Squash Complex, Court 2
30 November 2021

Sri Lanka
0

			1	2	3	4	5
1	(Hong Kong) (Sri Lanka)	Yip Tsz Fung; Methmal Wood	11; 1	11; 3	11; 3
2	(Hong Kong) (Sri Lanka)	Lau Tsz Kwan; Ravindu Laksiri	12; 10	11; 9	11; 1
3	(Hong Kong) (Sri Lanka)	Max Lee; Shariff Hakeem	11; 2	11; 7	11; 4

Hong Kong
3

National Squash Complex, Court 2
1 December 2021

Singapore
0

			1	2	3	4	5
1	(Hong Kong) (Singapore)	Yip Tsz Fung; Aaron Liang	11; 6	11; 6	11; 2
2	(Hong Kong) (Singapore)	Henry Leung; Chua Man Tong	11; 5	11; 3	11; 6
3	(Hong Kong) (Singapore)	Max Lee; Jerome Aw	11; 5	11; 4	11; 8

South Korea
3

National Squash Complex, Court 4
1 December 2021

Sri Lanka
0

			1	2	3	4	5
1	(South Korea) (Sri Lanka)	Yoo Jae Jin; Methmal Wood	11; 4	11; 5	11; 1
2	(South Korea) (Sri Lanka)	Lee Min-woo; Shamil Wakeel	11; 1	11; 8	11; 2
3	(South Korea) (Sri Lanka)	Woo Chang Wook; Ravindu Laksiri	11; 9	10; 12	11; 7	12; 10

Malaysia
3

National Squash Complex, Court 1
1 December 2021

Iran
0

			1	2	3	4	5
1	(Malaysia) (Iran)	Ng Eain Yow; Alireza Shameli	5; 11	11; 3	11; 0	11; 4
2	(Malaysia) (Iran)	Mohd Syafiq Kamal; Navid Maleksabet	12; 10	11; 5	11; 7
3	(Malaysia) (Iran)	Addeen Idrakie; Sayed Ziyaekashani	11; 5	11; 4	11; 5

South Korea
2

National Squash Complex, Court 4
1 December 2021

Iran
1

			1	2	3	4	5
1	(South Korea) (Iran)	Yoo Jae Jin; Alireza Shameli	8; 11	11; 5	9; 11	4; 11
2	(South Korea) (Iran)	Lee Min-woo; Navid Maleksabet	11; 8	8; 11	11; 3	11; 9
3	(South Korea) (Iran)	Woo Chang Wook; Sayed Ziyaekashani	6; 11	11; 8	4; 11	11; 6	11; 7

Sri Lanka
2

National Squash Complex, Court 2
1 December 2021

Singapore
1

			1	2	3	4	5
1	(Sri Lanka) (Singapore)	Methmal Wood; Aaron Liang	2; 11	5; 11	1; 5			retired
2	(Sri Lanka) (Singapore)	Shamil Wakeel; Chua Man Tong	11; 8	8; 11	13; 11	11; 9
3	(Sri Lanka) (Singapore)	Ravindu Laksiri; Kojiro Tan	11; 6	11; 9	11; 9

Malaysia
2

National Squash Complex, Grand Court
1 December 2021

Hong Kong
1

			1	2	3	4	5
1	(Malaysia) (Hong Kong)	Ng Eain Yow; Yip Tsz Fung	13; 11	11; 3	12; 10
2	(Malaysia) (Hong Kong)	Ivan Yuen; Henry Leung	9; 11	11; 6	11; 6	11; 8
3	(Malaysia) (Hong Kong)	Addeen Idrakie; Lau Tsz Kwan	9; 11	7; 11	8; 11

Malaysia
3

National Squash Complex, Court 1
2 December 2021

Sri Lanka
0

			1	2	3	4	5
1	(Malaysia) (Sri Lanka)	Ng Eain Yow; Shamil Wakeel	11; 7	11; 7	11; 7
2	(Malaysia) (Sri Lanka)	Ivan Yuen; Ravindu Laksiri	11; 7	11; 9	11; 7
3	(Malaysia) (Sri Lanka)	Mohd Syafiq Kamal; Shariff Hakeem	11; 3	11; 4	11; 5

Hong Kong
3

National Squash Complex, Court 2
2 December 2021

Iran
0

			1	2	3	4	5
1	(Hong Kong) (Iran)	Yip Tsz Fung; Alireza Shameli	11; 7	11; 9	11; 9
2	(Hong Kong) (Iran)	Lau Tsz Kwan; Ravindu Laksiri	11; 7	11; 4	11; 6
3	(Hong Kong) (Iran)	Max Lee; Sepehr Etemadpoor	11; 3	11; 4	11; 5

South Korea
3

National Squash Complex, Court 4
2 December 2021

Singapore
0

			1	2	3	4	5
1	(South Korea) (Singapore)	Yoo Jae Jin; Aaron Liang	5; 11	14; 12	11; 6	11; 9
2	(South Korea) (Singapore)	Lee Min-woo; Kojiro Tan	11; 7	11; 4	11; 5
3	(South Korea) (Singapore)	Woo Chang Wook; Jerome Aw	11; 6	11; 5	11; 4

== Second round ==
=== Ninth to twelfth places ===
9-12 semifinals
8	Philippines	2
10	Singapore	0
12	Indonesia	1
11	Sri Lanka	2

Ninth place playoff
8	Philippines	2
11	Sri Lanka	1
Eleventh place playoff
10	Singapore	2
12	Indonesia	0

==== 9th-12th semifinals ====
Philippines
2

National Squash Complex, Court 4
3 December 2021

Singapore
0

			1	2	3	4	5
1	(Philippines) (Singapore)	Robert Garcia; Aaron Liang	11; 7	11; 9	7; 11	11; 6
2	(Philippines) (Singapore)	David Pelino; Chua Man Tong	11; 9	14; 12	4; 11	6; 11	11; 8
3	(Philippines) (Singapore)	Reymark Begornia; Kojiro Tan						not played

Indonesia
1

National Squash Complex, Court 2
3 December 2021

Sri Lanka
2

			1	2	3	4	5
1	(Indonesia) (Sri Lanka)	Satria Laksana; Methmal Wood	9; 11	11; 8	11; 4	11; 4
2	(Indonesia) (Sri Lanka)	Agung Wilant; Shamil Wakeel	6; 11	5; 11	4; 11
3	(Indonesia) (Sri Lanka)	Ade Furkon; Ravindu Laksiri	7; 11	13; 11	6; 11	4; 11

==== 11th place playoff ====
Singapore
2

National Squash Complex, Court 4
4 December 2021

Indonesia
0

			1	2	3	4	5
1	(Singapore) (Indonesia)	Aaron Liang; Satria Laksana	11; 8	18; 16	11; 4
2	(Singapore) (Indonesia)	Kojiro Tan; Ade Furkon	11; 7	11; 8	11; 6
3	(Singapore) (Indonesia)	Chua Man Tong; Agung Wilant						not played

==== 9th place playoff ====
Philippines
2

National Squash Complex, Court 4
4 December 2021

Sri Lanka
1

			1	2	3	4	5
1	(Philippines) (Sri Lanka)	Robert Garcia; Methmal Wood	12; 10	11; 8	11; 4
2	(Philippines) (Sri Lanka)	David Pelino; Shamil Wakeel	11; 8	11; 4	11; 8
3	(Philippines) (Sri Lanka)	Reymark Begornia; Ravindu Laksiri	7; 11	11; 9	4; 11	3; 11

=== Fifth to eighth places ===
5-8 semifinals
4	Pakistan	2
6	Iran	0
9	Iraq	1
7	South Korea	2

Fifth place playoff
4	Pakistan	2
7	South Korea	1
Seventh place playoff
6	Iran	2
9	Iraq	0

==== 5th-8th semifinals ====
Pakistan
2

National Squash Complex, Court 2
3 December 2021

Iran
0

			1	2	3	4	5
1	(Pakistan) (Iran)	Tayyab Aslam; Alireza Shameli	8; 11	11; 6	11; 6	11; 9
2	(Pakistan) (Iran)	Asim Khan; Navid Maleksabet	11; 1	11; 9	11; 4
3	(Pakistan) (Iran)	Amaad Fareed; Seyed Ziyaekashani						not played

Iraq
1

National Squash Complex, Court 4
3 December 2021

South Korea
2

			1	2	3	4	5
1	(Iraq) (South Korea)	Mohamed Ferman Hassan; Yoo Jae Jin	9; 11	11; 8	11; 4	11; 4
2	(Iraq) (South Korea)	Rasool Alsultani; Lee Min-woo	14; 12	2; 11	4; 11	4; 11
3	(Iraq) (South Korea)	Hasanain Dakheel; Woo Chang Wook	12; 10	7; 11	6; 11	6; 11

==== 7th place playoff ====
Iran
2

National Squash Complex, Court 2
4 December 2021

Iraq
0

			1	2	3	4	5
1	(Iran) (Iraq)	Alireza Shameli; Mohamed Ferman Hassan	11; 7	2; 0				retired
2	(Iran) (Iraq)	Seyed Ziyaekashani; Abdullah Alsultani	11; 13	14; 12	11; 3	11; 1
3	(Iran) (Iraq)	Navid Malekshabet; Rasool Alsultani						not played

==== 5th place playoff ====
Pakistan
2

National Squash Complex, Court 4
4 December 2021

South Korea
1

			1	2	3	4	5
1	(Pakistan) (South Korea)	Tayyab Aslam; Yoo Jae Jin	8; 11	11; 9	6; 11	11; 13
2	(Pakistan) (South Korea)	Asim Khan; Lee Min-woo	11; 6	7; 11	11; 5	11; 9
3	(Pakistan) (South Korea)	Amaad Fareed; Woo Chang Wook	11; 8	11; 2	11; 3

=== Knockout stage ===
Semifinals
1	India	2
3	Hong Kong	0
5	Japan	0
2	Malaysia	2

Finals
1	India	1
2	Malaysia	2

==== Semifinals ====
India
2

National Squash Complex, Grand Court
3 December 2021

Hong Kong
0

			1	2	3	4	5
1	(India) (Hong Kong)	Saurav Ghosal; Yip Tsz Fung	10; 12	11; 6	11; 6	15; 13
2	(India) (Hong Kong)	Ramit Tandon; Henry Leung	4; 11	11; 5	11; 8	11; 5
3	(India) (Hong Kong)	Mahesh Mangaonkar; Lau Tsz Kwan						not played

Japan
0

National Squash Complex, Grand Court
3 December 2021

Malaysia
2

			1	2	3	4	5
1	(Japan) (Malaysia)	Ryosei Kobayashi; Ng Eain Yow	4; 11	2; 11	1; 11
2	(Japan) (Malaysia)	Tomotaka Endo; Ivan Yuen	3; 11	9; 11	7; 11
3	(Japan) (Malaysia)	Ryunosuke Tsukue; Addeen Idrakie						not played

==== Finals ====
India
1

National Squash Complex, Grand Court
4 December 2021

Malaysia
2

			1	2	3	4	5
1	(India) (Malaysia)	Saurav Ghosal; Ng Eain Yow	10; 11	4; 11	8; 11
2	(India) (Malaysia)	Mahesh Mangaonkar; Mohd Syafiq Kamal	11; 9	11; 7	11; 8
3	(India) (Malaysia)	Ramit Tandon; Ivan Yuen	8; 11	11; 8	3; 11	1; 11

== Final rankings ==
Position	Team
1st place, gold medalist(s)	Malaysia
2nd place, silver medalist(s)	India
3rd place, bronze medalist(s)	Hong Kong
3rd place, bronze medalist(s)	Japan
5th	Pakistan
6th	South Korea
7th	Iran
8th	Iraq
9th	Philippines
10th	Sri Lanka
11th	Singapore
12th	Indonesia

Draws:

Matches:

Players:

Result:

== See also ==
- Asian Team Squash Championships
- 2021 Women's Asian Team Squash Championships

Preceded by Cheongju; 2018	Asian Team Squash Championships; Malaysia (Kuala Lumpur); 2021	Succeeded by Asian Championships; 2023
