= 2017 Men's Asian Individual Squash Championships =

2017 Asian Individual Squash Championships

Details
- Event name: 2017 Asian Individual Squash Championships
- Location: (India) Chennai
- Venue: Express Avenue Mall
- Website squashinthemall.com

The 2017 Men's Asian Individual Squash Championships is the men's edition of the 2017 Asian Individual Squash Championships, which serves as the individual Asian championship for squash players. The event took place at Express Avenue Mall in Chennai from 26 to 30 April 2017. Max Lee won his first Asian Individual Championships title, defeating Saurav Ghosal in the final.

== Seeds ==
1. (Hong Kong) Max Lee (champion)
2. (India) Saurav Ghosal (final)
3. (Malaysia) Mohd Nafiizwan Adnan (semifinals)
4. (Hong Kong) Yip Tsz Fung (quarterfinals)
5. (Hong Kong) Leo Au (semifinals)
6. (Qatar) Abdulla Al-Tamimi (third round)
7. (Malaysia) Yuen Chee Wern (quarterfinals)
8. (Pakistan) Farhan Mehboob (second round)
9. (Pakistan) Farhan Zaman (second round)
10. (India) Vikram Malhotra (quarterfinals)
11. (India) Mahesh Mangaonkar (third round)
12. (Pakistan) Tayyab Aslam (second round)
13. (Hong Kong) Wong Chi Him (third round)
14. (Malaysia) Ng Eain Yow (third round)
15. (India) Harinder Pal Sandhu (quarterfinals)
16. (Jordan) Mohammad Alsarraj (third round)

== Draw and results ==
=== Finals ===
Quarter finals
1	(Hong Kong) Max Lee	11	11	11
15	(India) Harinder Pal Sandhu	8	9	8
7	(Malaysia) Yuen Chee Wern	9	6	11	14
3	(Malaysia) Mohd Nafiizwan Adnan	11	11	6	16
4	(Hong Kong) Yip Tsz Fung	12	10	6	4
5	(Hong Kong) Leo Au	10	12	11	11
10	(India) Vikram Malhotra	7	7	7
2	(India) Saurav Ghosal	11	11	11

Semi finals
1	(Hong Kong) Max Lee	12	11	11
3	(Malaysia) Mohd Nafiizwan Adnan	10	6	5
5	(Hong Kong) Leo Au	6	7	3
2	(India) Saurav Ghosal	11	11	11

Final
1	(Hong Kong) Max Lee	5	11	11	11
2	(India) Saurav Ghosal	11	4	8	7

=== Top half ===
==== Section 1 ====
First round
1	(Hong Kong) Max Lee
BYE
(Philippines) Robert Garcia	11	6	9	11	6
(Iran) Navid Maleksabet	6	11	11	7	11
(Singapore) Samuel Kang	11	11	11
(Nepal) Arhant Keshar Simha	4	1	2
BYE
13	(Hong Kong) Wong Chi Him
15	(India) Harinder Pal Sandhu
BYE
(Philippines) Reymark Begornia	11	11	11
(Iran) Erfan Jamshidi	4	5	3
(Pakistan) Waqar Mehboob
BYE
BYE
6	(Qatar) Abdulla Al-Tamimi

Second round
1	(Hong Kong) Max Lee	11	11	11
(Iran) Navid Maleksabet	8	6	6
(Singapore) Samuel Kang	4	10	7
13	(Hong Kong) Wong Chi Him	11	12	11
15	(India) Harinder Pal Sandhu	11	11	11
(Philippines) Reymark Begornia	1	5	4
(Pakistan) Waqar Mehboob
6	(Qatar) Abdulla Al-Tamimi	w	/	o

Third Round
1	(Hong Kong) Max Lee	11	11	11
13	(Hong Kong) Wong Chi Him	3	6	6
15	(India) Harinder Pal Sandhu	4	11	8	11	11
6	(Qatar) Abdulla Al-Tamimi	11	6	11	6	6

Quarter finals
1	(Hong Kong) Max Lee	11	11	11
15	(India) Harinder Pal Sandhu	8	9	8

==== Section 2 ====
First round
7	(Malaysia) Yuen Chee Wern
BYE
BYE
(South Korea) Ko Young-Jo
(Iran) Soheil Shameli	1	5	5
(India) Velavan Senthilkumar	11	11	11
BYE
9	(Pakistan) Farhan Zaman
12	(Pakistan) Tayyab Aslam
BYE
BYE
(Jordan) Ahmad Alsaraj
(India) Aditya Jagtap	9	7	11	11	11
(Japan) Ryunosuke Tsukue	11	11	6	6	4
BYE
3	(Malaysia) Mohd Nafi. Adnan

Second round
7	(Malaysia) Yuen Chee Wern	11	11	11
(South Korea) Ko Young-Jo	8	9	7
(India) Velavan Senthilkumar	w	/	o
9	(Pakistan) Farhan Zaman
12	(Pakistan) Tayyab Aslam
(Jordan) Ahmad Alsaraj	w	/	o
(India) Aditya Jagtap	5	6	8
3	(Malaysia) Mohd Nafi. Adnan	11	11	11

Third Round
7	(Malaysia) Yuen Chee Wern	11	11	11
(India) Velavan Senthilkumar	1	1	8
(Jordan) Ahmad Alsaraj	3	2	1
3	(Malaysia) Mohd Nafi. Adnan	11	11	11

Quarter finals
7	(Malaysia) Yuen Chee Wern	9	6	11	14
3	(Malaysia) Mohd Nafi. Adnan	11	11	6	16

=== Bottom half ===
==== Section 3 ====
First round
4	(Hong Kong) Yip Tsz Fung
BYE
(Singapore) Pang Ka Hoe	9	12	7	10
(South Korea) Yoo Jae-Jin	11	10	11	12
(Singapore) Vivian Rhamanan
BYE
BYE
11	(India) Mahesh Mangaonkar
14	(Malaysia) Ng Eain Yow
BYE
BYE
(South Korea) Park Jong-Myoung
(Philippines) David Pelino	8	2	6
(South Korea) Lee Geondong	11	11	11
BYE
5	(Hong Kong) Leo Au

Second round
4	(Hong Kong) Yip Tsz Fung	11	11	11
(South Korea) Yoo Jae-Jin	7	4	6
(Singapore) Vivian Rhamanan	4	7	6
11	(India) Mahesh Mangaonkar	11	11	11
14	(Malaysia) Ng Eain Yow	11	11	11
(South Korea) Park Jong-Myoung	3	3	4
(South Korea) Lee Geondong	6	3	8
5	(Hong Kong) Leo Au	11	11	11

Third Round
4	(Hong Kong) Yip Tsz Fung	12	8	11	11
11	(India) Mahesh Mangaonkar	10	11	8	3
14	(Malaysia) Ng Eain Yow	7	12	7
5	(Hong Kong) Leo Au	11	14	11

Quarter finals
4	(Hong Kong) Yip Tsz Fung	12	10	6	4
5	(Hong Kong) Leo Au	10	12	11	11

==== Section 4 ====
First round
8	(Pakistan) Farhan Mehboob
BYE
BYE
(Malaysia) Muhammad A Idrakie
(Iran) Alireza Shameli	11	11	11
(Nepal) Amrit Thapa Magar	5	5	6
BYE
10	(India) Vikram Malhotra
16	(Jordan) Mohammad Alsarraj
BYE
BYE
(Qatar) Syed Azlan Amjad
(Philippines) Lydio Espinola Jr	3	6	5
(Singapore) Benedict Chan	11	11	11
BYE
2	(India) Saurav Ghosal

Second round
8	(Pakistan) Farhan Mehboob
(Malaysia) Muhammad A Idrakie	w	/	o
(Iran) Alireza Shameli	7	8	13
10	(India) Vikram Malhotra	11	11	15
16	(Jordan) Mohammad Alsarraj	w	/	o
(Qatar) Syed Azlan Amjad
(Singapore) Benedict Chan	2	3	5
2	(India) Saurav Ghosal	11	11	11

Third Round
(Malaysia) Muhammad A Idrakie	1	4	9
10	(India) Vikram Malhotra	11	11	11
16	(Jordan) Mohammad Alsarraj	8	5	2
2	(India) Saurav Ghosal	11	11	11

Quarter finals
10	(India) Vikram Malhotra	7	7	7
2	(India) Saurav Ghosal	11	11	11

== See also ==
- 2017 Women's Asian Individual Squash Championships
- Asian Individual Squash Championships

Preceded by Kuwait; 2015	Asian Squash Championships; India (Chennai); 2017	Succeeded by Kuala Lumpur; 2019
