= 2021 Men's Asian Individual Squash Championships =

Squash competition

2021 Asian Individual Squash Championships
- 21st Men's Asian Individual Squash Championships
- Location: (Pakistan) Islamabad
- Venue: Mushaf Squash Complex

Results
- Champion: (Malaysia) Ng Eain Yow
- Runner-up: (Hong Kong) Yip Tsz Fung
- Semi-finalists: (Hong Kong) Lau Tsz Kwan (Pakistan) Nasir Iqbal

The 2021 Men's Asian Individual Squash Championships is the men's edition of the 2021 Asian Individual Squash Championships, which serves as the individual Asian championship for squash players. The event took place at Mushaf Squash Complex in Islamabad from 15 to 19 December 2021.

== Seeds ==
1. (Malaysia) Ng Eain Yow (champion)
2. (Qatar) Abdulla Al-Tamimi (second round)
3. (Pakistan) Tayyab Aslam (quarterfinals)
4. (Malaysia) Ivan Yuen (quarterfinals)
5. (Hong Kong) Yip Tsz Fung (finals)
6. (Hong Kong) Henry Leung (quarterfinals)
7. (Pakistan) Asim Khan (second round)
8. (Qatar) Syed Azlan Amjad (second round)

9. (Hong Kong) Lau Tsz Kwan (semifinals)
10. (Hong Kong) Max Lee (second round)
11. (Pakistan) Nasir Iqbal (semifinals)
12. (Malaysia) Mohd Syafiq Kamal (quarterfinals)
13. (Malaysia) Addeen Idrakie (second round)
14. (Pakistan) Farhan Zaman (second round)
15. (Pakistan) Israr Ahmed (second round)
16. (Pakistan) Amaad Fareed (second round)

== Draw and results ==
=== Finals ===
Semi-finals
1 | (Malaysia) Ng Eain Yow | 11 | 11 | 11
9 | (Hong Kong) Lau Tsz Kwan | 4 | 4 | 9
5 | (Hong Kong) Yip Tsz Fung | 11 | 11 | 3
11 | (Pakistan) Nasir Iqbal | 6 | 4 | 1^{r}

Final
1 | (Malaysia) Ng Eain Yow | 11 | 13 | 11
5 | (Hong Kong) Yip Tsz Fung | 6 | 11 | 9

=== Top half ===
==== Section 1 ====
| First Round | | | | | | | Second Round | | | | | | | Quarter-finals |
| | | | | | | | 1 | (Malaysia) Ng Eain Yow | 11 | 11 | 11 |
| | (Sri Lanka) Ravindu Laksiri | 5 | 6 | 9 | | | 14 | (Pakistan) Farhan Zaman | 4 | 4 | 8 |
| 14 | (Pakistan) Farhan Zaman | 11 | 11 | 11 | | | | | | | | | | 1 | (Malaysia) Ng Eain Yow | 11 | 11 | 11 |
| 12 | (Malaysia) Mohd Syafiq Kamal | 5 | 5 | 11 | 11 | 11 | | | | | | | | 12 | (Malaysia) Mohd Syafiq Kamal | 6 | 3 | 5 |
| | (Kuwait) Ammar Al-Tamimi | 11 | 11 | 6 | 2 | 4 | 12 | (Malaysia) Mohd Syafiq Kamal | 11 | 11 | 3 | 11 | 11 |
| | | | | | | | 7 | (Pakistan) Asim Khan | 13 | 6 | 11 | 5 | 5 |

==== Section 2 ====
| First Round | | | | | | | Second Round | | | | | | Quarter-finals |
| | | | | | | | 8 | (Qatar) Syed Azlan Amjad | 12 | 11 | 5 | 4 |
| | (Sri Lanka) Shariff Hakeem | | | | | | 9 | (Hong Kong) Lau Tsz Kwan | 14 | 9 | 11 | 11 |
| 9 | (Hong Kong) Lau Tsz Kwan | w | / | o | | | | | | | | | 9 | (Hong Kong) Lau Tsz Kwan | 5 | 9 | 11 | 11 | 13 |
| 15 | (Pakistan) Israr Ahmed | 4 | 11 | 8 | 16 | 11 | | | | | | | 3 | (Pakistan) Tayyab Aslam | 11 | 11 | 5 | 3 | 11 |
| | (Kuwait) Falah Mohammad | 11 | 8 | 11 | 14 | 9 | 15 | (Pakistan) Israr Ahmed | 8 | 11 | 2 | 7 |
| | | | | | | | 3 | (Pakistan) Tayyab Aslam | 11 | 7 | 11 | 11 |

=== Bottom half ===
==== Section 3 ====
| First Round | | | | | Second Round | | | | | | Quarter-finals |
| | | | | | 4 | (Malaysia) Ivan Yuen | 11 | 7 | 11 | 11 |
| | (Kuwait) Hussain Alzaatari | 6 | 6 | 2 | 10 | (Hong Kong) Max Lee | 8 | 11 | 6 | 7 |
| 10 | (Hong Kong) Max Lee | 11 | 11 | 11 | | | | | | | 4 | (Malaysia) Ivan Yuen | 7 | 4 | 5 |
| 12 | (Malaysia) Addeen Idrakie | 11 | 11 | 11 | | | | | | | 5 | (Hong Kong) Yip Tsz Fung | 11 | 11 | 11 |
| | (Sri Lanka) Shamil Wakeel | 5 | 8 | 6 | 13 | (Malaysia) Addeen Idrakie | 5 | 9 | 2 |
| | | | | | 5 | (Hong Kong) Yip Tsz Fung | 11 | 11 | 11 |

==== Section 4 ====
| First Round | | | | | Second Round | | | | | | | Quarter-finals |
| | | | | | 6 | (Hong Kong) Henry Leung | 5 | 7 | 11 | 11 | 12 |
| | (Kuwait) Mohammad Alkhanfar | 10 | 8 | 8 | 16 | (Pakistan) Amaad Fareed | 11 | 11 | 9 | 8 | 10 |
| 16 | (Pakistan) Amaad Fareed | 12 | 11 | 11 | | | | | | | | 6 | (Hong Kong) Henry Leung | 4 | 9 | 11 | 7 |
| 11 | (Pakistan) Nasir Iqbal | 11 | 11 | 11 | | | | | | | | 11 | (Pakistan) Nasir Iqbal | 11 | 11 | 3 | 11 |
| | (Sri Lanka) Methmal Wood | 6 | 8 | 2 | 11 | (Pakistan) Nasir Iqbal | 11 | 11 | 11 |
| | | | | | 2 | (Qatar) Abdulla Al-Tamimi | 6 | 8 | 2 |

Seed:
Draw:
Results:

== See also ==
- 2021 Women's Asian Individual Squash Championships
- Asian Individual Squash Championships

| Preceded by Kuala Lumpur; 2019 | Asian Squash Championships; Pakistan (Islamabad); 2021 | Succeeded by Asian Championships; 2023 |
