= 2019 Men's Asian Individual Squash Championships =

2019 Asian Individual Squash Championships
- 20th Men's Asian Individual Squash Championships
- Location: (Malaysia) Kuala Lumpur
- Venue: National Squash Centre
- Website; SRAM Website

Results
- Champion: (India) Saurav Ghosal
- Runner-up: (Hong Kong) Leo Au
- Semi-finalists: (Malaysia) Ng Eain Yow (Hong Kong) Yip Tsz Fung

The 2019 Men's Asian Individual Squash Championships is the men's edition of the 2019 Asian Individual Squash Championships, which serves as the individual Asian championship for squash players. The event took place at National Squash Centre in Kuala Lumpur from 1 to 5 May 2019.

== Seeds ==
1. (India) Saurav Ghosal (champion)
2. (Hong Kong) Yip Tsz Fung (semifinals)
3. (Hong Kong) Max Lee (quarterfinals)
4. (Hong Kong) Leo Au (final)
5. (Qatar) Abdulla Al-Tamimi (quarterfinals)
6. (Malaysia) Mohd Nafiizwan Adnan (quarterfinals)
7. (Malaysia) Ng Eain Yow (semifinals)
8. (Malaysia) Ivan Yuen (quarterfinals)

9. (Pakistan) Tayyab Aslam (third round)
10. (Hong Kong) Henry Leung (second round)
11. (Pakistan) Asim Khan (third round)
12. (Malaysia) Mohd Syafiq Kamal (third round)
13. (Malaysia) Addeen Idrakie (second round)
14. (Kuwait) Ammar Al-Tamimi (third round)
15. (Iran) Sajjad Zareeian (third round)
16. (Japan) Tomotaka Endo (third round)

== Draw and results ==
=== Finals ===
Semi-finals
1	(India) Saurav Ghosal	11	11	11
7	(Malaysia) Ng Eain Yow	2	6	4
4	(Hong Kong) Leo Au	11	11	11
2	(Hong Kong) Yip Tsz Fung	3	8	4

Final
1	(India) Saurav Ghosal	11	11	11
4	(Hong Kong) Leo Au	9	2	8

=== Top half ===
==== Section 1 ====
First round
(Kuwait) Ali Al-Shammari	7	2	1
(Philippines) David Pelino	11	11	11
(Thailand) Chattaporn Juntanayingyong	6	11	5	5
(Nepal) Arhant Simha	11	8	11	11

Second round
1	(India) Saurav Ghosal	11	11	11
(Philippines) David Pelino	5	2	2
(Japan) Ryunosuke Tsukue	11	11	11
13	(Malaysia) Addeen Idrakie	3	5	6
10	(Hong Kong) Henry Leung	11	7	9	11	7
(Philippines) Robert Garcia	7	11	11	8	11
(Nepal) Arhant Simha	2	4	3
6	(Malaysia) Mohd Nafiizwan Adnan	11	11	11

Third Round
1	(India) Saurav Ghosal	11	11	11
(Japan) Ryunosuke Tsukue	5	8	3
(Philippines) Robert Garcia	11	8	13
6	(Malaysia) Mohd Nafiizwan Adnan	13	11	15

Quarter-finals
1	(India) Saurav Ghosal	11	11	11
6	(Malaysia) Mohd Nafiizwan Adnan	4	4	3

==== Section 2 ====
First round
(Chinese Taipei) Chen Wun-lin	7	11	11	11
(Sri Lanka) Gihan Thanthrige	11	9	6	1
(Sri Lanka) Druvinka Perera	5	6	5
(Kuwait) Mohammad Al-Khanfar	11	11	11
(Sri Lanka) Mohamad Usama	11	14	6	8	11
(Chinese Taipei) Huang Liang-yu	6	12	11	11	4

Second round
7	(Malaysia) Ng Eain Yow	11	11	11
(Chinese Taipei) Chen Wun-lin	0	3	2
(Kuwait) Mohammad Al-Khanfar	4	5	1
14	(Kuwait) Ammar Al-Tamimi	11	11	11
9	(Pakistan) Tayyab Aslam	11	11	11
(Sri Lanka) Mohamad Usama	2	5	4
(Malaysia) Ong Sai Hung	4	9	6
3	(Hong Kong) Max Lee	11	11	11

Third Round
7	(Malaysia) Ng Eain Yow	11	11	11
14	(Kuwait) Ammar Al-Tamimi	2	6	4
9	(Pakistan) Tayyab Aslam	5	10	11	1
3	(Hong Kong) Max Lee	11	12	8	11

Quarter-finals
7	(Malaysia) Ng Eain Yow	11	8	11	11
3	(Hong Kong) Max Lee	8	11	7	7

=== Bottom half ===
==== Section 3 ====
First round
(Sri Lanka) Mohammadu Hakeem	4	4	1
(Chinese Taipei) Huang Chen-yao	11	11	11
(Thailand) Phuwis Poonsiri	8	10	11
(Philippines) Reymark Bergonia	11	12	13
(South Korea) Park Jong-myeong	11	11	11
(Thailand) Natthakit Jivasuwan	5	1	6
(South Korea) Ko Young-jo	11	11	11
(Kuwait) Ali Aber	4	2	2

Second round
4	(Hong Kong) Leo Au	12	11	11
(Chinese Taipei) Huang Chen-yao	10	3	4
(Philippines) Reymark Bergonia	6	9	9
11	(Pakistan) Asim Khan	11	11	11
16	(Japan) Tomotaka Endo	7	11	8	11	11
(South Korea) Park Jong-myeong	11	9	11	7	5
(South Korea) Ko Young-jo	2	11	3	8
8	(Malaysia) Ivan Yuen	11	2	11	11

Third Round
4	(Hong Kong) Leo Au	11	11	11
11	(Pakistan) Asim Khan	7	6	3
16	(Japan) Tomotaka Endo	12	5	9	0
8	(Malaysia) Ivan Yuen	10	11	11	11

Quarter-finals
4	(Hong Kong) Leo Au	6	11	11	11
8	(Malaysia) Ivan Yuen	11	7	5	7

==== Section 4 ====
First round
(Chinese Taipei) Chen Sheng-kai	w	/	o
(Iran) Samiollah Ghasel Abadi
(South Korea) Lee Se-hyun	11	11	11
(Qatar) Hamad Al-Amri	2	0	2

Second round
5	(Qatar) Abdulla Al-Tamimi	11	11	11
(Chinese Taipei) Chen Sheng-kai	3	2	7
(India) Abhishek Pradhan	8	11	3
15	(Iran) Sajjad Zareeian	11	13	11
12	(Malaysia) Mohd Syafiq Kamal	11	11	11
(South Korea) Lee Se-hyun	9	7	4
(South Korea) Woo Chang-wook	4	4	7
2	(Hong Kong) Yip Tsz Fung	11	11	11

Third Round
5	(Qatar) Abdulla Al-Tamimi	11	11	11
15	(Iran) Sajjad Zareeian	3	9	7
12	(Malaysia) Mohd Syafiq Kamal	8	4	6
2	(Hong Kong) Yip Tsz Fung	11	11	11

Quarter-finals
5	(Qatar) Abdulla Al-Tamimi	8	5	3
2	(Hong Kong) Yip Tsz Fung	11	11	11

== See also ==
- 2019 Women's Asian Individual Squash Championships
- Asian Individual Squash Championships

Preceded by Chennai; 2017	Asian Squash Championships; Malaysia (Kuala Lumpur); 2019	Succeeded by Islamabad; 2021
