= Squash at the 2022 Commonwealth Games – Men's singles =

Squash competition

Squash – Men's singles at the 2022 Commonwealth Games
- Venue: University of Birmingham Hockey and Squash Centre
- Dates: July 29 – 3 August 2022
- Competitors: 53 from 26 nations

Medalists
gold medal	Paul Coll	New Zealand
silver medal	Joel Makin	Wales
bronze medal	Saurav Ghosal	India

The men's singles squash competitions at the 2022 Commonwealth Games in Birmingham, England took place between July 29 and August 3 at University of Birmingham Hockey and Squash Centre. A total of 53 competitors from 26 nations took part.

== Schedule ==
The schedule is as follows:

Date	Round
Friday 29 July	Round of 64
Saturday 30 July	Round of 32
Sunday 31 July	Round of 16
Monday 1 August	Quarter-finals
Tuesday 2 August	Semi-finals
Wednesday 3 August	Medal matches

== Seeds ==
The seeds for the competition were revealed on July 19, 2022.

1. Paul Coll (NZL) (gold medalist)
2. Joel Makin (WAL) (silver medalist)
3. Saurav Ghosal (IND) (bronze medalist)
4. Patrick Rooney (ENG) (round of 16)
5. Eain Yow Ng (MAS) (quarterfinals)
6. Adrian Waller (ENG) (quarterfinals)
7. James Willstrop (ENG) (semifinals)
8. Greg Lobban (SCO) (quarterfinals)
9. Ramit Tandon (IND) (round of 32)
10. Alan Clyne (SCO) (round of 16)
11. Tayyab Aslam (PAK) (round of 32)
12. Ivan Yuen (MAS) (round of 16)
13. David Baillargeon (CAN) (round of 16)
14. Rory Stewart (SCO) (quarterfinals)
15. Mohammad Syafiq Kamal (MAS) (round of 32)
16. Lwamba Chileshe (NZL) (round of 32)

== Results ==
The draw is as follows:

=== Finals ===
Quarterfinals
1	Paul Coll (NZL)	12	11	11
6	Adrian Waller (ENG)	10	4	7
8	Greg Lobban (SCO)	5	11	7	3
3	Saurav Ghosal (IND)	11	8	11	11
14	Rory Stewart (SCO)	5	11	11	6	8
7	James Willstrop (ENG)	11	9	7	11	11
5	Eain Yow Ng (MAS)	4	11	3	9
2	Joel Makin (WAL)	11	9	11	11

Semifinals
1	Paul Coll (NZL)	11	11	11
3	Saurav Ghosal (IND)	9	4	1
7	James Willstrop (ENG)	5	5	9
2	Joel Makin (WAL)	11	11	11

Gold medal match
1	Paul Coll (NZL)	3	11	8	11	11
2	Joel Makin (WAL)	11	9	11	8	7
Bronze medal match
3	Saurav Ghosal (IND)	11	11	11
7	James Willstrop (ENG)	6	1	4

=== Top half ===
==== Section 1 ====
Round of 64
Kijan Sultana (MLT)	7	13	11	10
Niall Engerer (MLT)	11	15	9	12
Emyr Evans (WAL)	11	11	11
Luca Reich (IVB)	1	3	0
Madako Suari (PNG)	2	3	2
15	Mohammad Syafiq Kamal (MAS)	11	11	11
Evans Ayih (GHA)	1	1	3
Christopher Binnie (JAM)	11	11	11
Marika Matanatabu (FIJ)	11	11	5	8	9
Jake Kelly (CAY)	8	9	11	11	11

Round of 32
1	Paul Coll (NZL)	11	11	11
Niall Engerer (MLT)	4	2	4
Emyr Evans (WAL)	11	11	7	11
15	Mohammad Syafiq Kamal (MAS)	8	3	11	7
9	Ramit Tandon (IND)	w	/	o
Christopher Binnie (JAM)
Jake Kelly (CAY)	4	3	3
6	Adrian Waller (ENG)	11	11	11

Round of 16
1	Paul Coll (NZL)	8	11	11	12
Emyr Evans (WAL)	11	0	5	10
Christopher Binnie (JAM)	7	4	4
6	Adrian Waller (ENG)	11	11	11

Quarterfinals
1	Paul Coll (NZL)	12	11	11
6	Adrian Waller (ENG)	10	4	7

==== Section 2 ====
Round of 64
Ravindu Laksiri (SRI)	11	11	7	11
Shomari Wiltshire (GUY)	2	1	11	3
Rhys Dowling (AUS)	11	11	11
Jason Doyle (SVG)	1	2	5
Khamal Cumberbatch (BAR)	9	9	9
12	Ivan Yuen (MAS)	11	11	11
13	David Baillargeon (CAN)	11	11	11
Chayse Mc Quan (TTO)	3	4	3
Othniel Bailey (SVG)	1	4	5
Peter Creed (WAL)	11	11	11
Shawn Simpson (BAR)	11	11	6	9	1
Shamil Wakeel (SRI)	6	9	11	11	11

Round of 32
8	Greg Lobban (SCO)	11	11	12
Ravindu Laksiri (SRI)	9	4	10
Rhys Dowling (AUS)	9	11	5	4
12	Ivan Yuen (MAS)	11	9	11	11
13	David Baillargeon (CAN)	11	6	11	11
Peter Creed (WAL)	8	11	6	4
Shamil Wakeel (SRI)	4	4	6
3	Saurav Ghosal (IND)	11	11	11

Round of 16
8	Greg Lobban (SCO)	11	9	11	7	11
12	Ivan Yuen (MAS)	3	11	9	11	7
13	David Baillargeon (CAN)	6	2	6
3	Saurav Ghosal (IND)	11	11	11

Quarterfinals
8	Greg Lobban (SCO)	5	11	7	3
3	Saurav Ghosal (IND)	11	8	11	11

=== Bottom half ===
==== Section 3 ====
Round of 64
Julian Jervis (CAY)	11	11	11
Clement Anafo (GHA)	1	1	2
Temwa Chileshe (NZL)	11	11	11
Jules Snagg (SVG)	2	3	3
Muqtadir Nimji (KEN)	7	11	4
14	Rory Stewart (SCO)	11	13	11
Julian Morrison (JAM)	5	4	3
Nasir Iqbal (PAK)	11	11	11
Christian Navas (GIB)	9	11	11	11
Jace Jervis (CAY)	11	5	8	6

Round of 32
4	Patrick Rooney (ENG)	11	11	11
Julian Jervis (CAY)	2	6	6
Temwa Chileshe (NZL)	11	4	4	4
14	Rory Stewart (SCO)	8	11	11	11
11	Tayyab Aslam (PAK)	5	3	Ret.
Nasir Iqbal (PAK)	11	9
Christian Navas (GIB)	1	2	6
7	James Willstrop (ENG)	11	11	11

Round of 16
4	Patrick Rooney (ENG)	10	11	12	11	5
14	Rory Stewart (SCO)	12	7	10	13	11
Nasir Iqbal (PAK)	6	4	7
7	James Willstrop (ENG)	11	11	11

Quarterfinals
14	Rory Stewart (SCO)	5	11	11	6	8
7	James Willstrop (ENG)	11	9	7	11	11

==== Section 4 ====
Round of 64
Jason-Ray Khalil (GUY)	12	11	9	11	11
Paul Kadoma (UGA)	14	9	11	4	9
Nick Sachvie (CAN)	11	10	11	11
Kundanji Kalengo (ZAM)	2	12	2	1
Feanor Siaguru (PNG)	4	3	4
16	Lwamba Chileshe (NZL)	11	11	11
Joe Chapman (IVB)	5	5	5
Abhay Singh (IND)	11	11	11
Michael Kawooya (UGA)	11	11	11
Marcus Adela (SEY)	8	1	3

Round of 32
5	Eain Yow Ng (MAS)	11	11	11
Jason-Ray Khalil (GUY)	4	2	4
Nick Sachvie (CAN)	11	6	6	11	11
16	Lwamba Chileshe (NZL)	6	11	11	8	4
10	Alan Clyne (SCO)	11	9
Abhay Singh (IND)	3	2	Ret.
Michael Kawooya (UGA)	1	2	2
2	Joel Makin (WAL)	11	11	11

Round of 16
5	Eain Yow Ng (MAS)	11	11	11
Nick Sachvie (CAN)	6	6	4
10	Alan Clyne (SCO)	3	4	4
2	Joel Makin (WAL)	11	11	11

Quarterfinals
5	Eain Yow Ng (MAS)	4	11	3	9
2	Joel Makin (WAL)	11	9	11	11
