= Squash at the 2018 Asian Games – Men's team =

2018 Asian Games - Men's Team Squash

Men's team at the 2018 Asian Games
- Venue: Gelora Bung Karno Squash Stadium
- Dates: 27 August – 1 September 2018
- Competitors: 47 from 12 nations

Medalists
gold medal	Malaysia; Mohd Nafiizwan Adnan, Mohd Syafiq Kamal, Ng Eain Yow, Ivan Yuen
silver medal	Hong Kong; Leo Au, Max Lee, Henry Leung, Yip Tsz Fung
bronze medal	India; Saurav Ghosal, Mahesh Mangaonkar, Harinder Pal Sandhu, Ramit Tandon
bronze medal	Pakistan; Israr Ahmed, Tayyab Aslam, Amaad Fareed, Asim Khan

The men's team squash event was part of the squash programme and took place between 27 August and 1 September 2018, at the Gelora Bung Karno Hall D.

== Schedule ==
All times are Western Indonesia Time (UTC+07:00)

Date	Time	Event
Monday, 27 August 2018	10:00	Preliminary round
Tuesday, 28 August 2018	12:30	Preliminary round
Wednesday, 29 August 2018	12:30	Preliminary round
Thursday, 30 August 2018	16:00	Preliminary round
Friday, 31 August 2018	16:00	Semifinals
Saturday, 1 September 2018	17:00	Gold medal match

== Results ==
=== Preliminary round ===
==== Pool A ====
Pos	Team	Pld	W	L	MF	MA	Pts	Qualification
1	Hong Kong	5	5	0	15	0	10	Semifinals
2	Pakistan	5	4	1	11	4	8	Semifinals
3	Japan	5	3	2	10	5	6	
4	South Korea	5	2	3	5	10	4	
5	Philippines	5	1	4	4	11	2	
6	Nepal	5	0	5	0	15	0	

Source: Results

27 August	Hong Kong	3–0	Philippines

Max Lee	3–2	Robert Garcia	11–6, 11–5, 5–11, 5–11, 11–3
Henry Leung	3–0	Reymark Begornia	11–4, 11–4, 11–1
Yip Tsz Fung	3–0	David Pelino	11–2, 11–2, 11–2

27 August	Pakistan	2–1	Japan

Asim Khan	0–3	Ryunosuke Tsukue	12–14, 7–11, 2–11
Israr Ahmed	3–0	Ryosei Kobayashi	11–4, 11–3, 11–7
Tayyab Aslam	3–0	Tomotaka Endo	11–6, 11–6, 12–10

27 August	South Korea	3–0	Nepal

Ko Young-jo	3–0	Amrit Thapa Magar	11–2, 11–1, 11–4
Lee Seung-taek	3–0	Rajendra Shakya	11–0, 11–5, 11–5
Lee Se-hyun	3–0	Arhant Keshar Simha	11–4, 11–3, 11–4

27 August	Hong Kong	3–0	Japan

Leo Au	3–2	Ryunosuke Tsukue	12–10, 5–11, 11–6, 0–11, 11–8
Henry Leung	3–1	Ryosei Kobayashi	11–7, 7–11, 11–6, 12–10
Yip Tsz Fung	3–0	Tomotaka Endo	11–7, 11–5, 11–5

27 August	Pakistan	3–0	Nepal

Asim Khan	3–0	Amrit Thapa Magar	11–2, 11–2, 11–2
Amaad Fareed	3–0	Gyanu Chaudhary	11–2, 11–4, 11–1
Israr Ahmed	3–0	Arhant Keshar Simha	11–5, 11–2, 11–4

27 August	South Korea	2–1	Philippines

Ko Young-jo	2–3	Robert Garcia	6–11, 9–11, 11–8, 11–6, 10–12
Lee Seung-taek	3–1	Reymark Begornia	3–11, 11–7, 11–4, 11–7
Lee Se-hyun	3–0	David Pelino	11–8, 11–8, 11–5

28 August	Hong Kong	3–0	South Korea

Yip Tsz Fung	3–0	Lee Seung-taek	11–6, 11–2, 11–2
Max Lee	3–1	Ko Young-jo	11–9, 11–5, 12–14, 11–3
Henry Leung	3–1	Lee Nyeon-ho	11–9, 11–6, 12–14, 11–8

28 August	Pakistan	3–0	Philippines

Israr Ahmed	3–0	David Pelino	11–6, 11–3, 11–6
Tayyab Aslam	3–0	Robert Garcia	11–4, 11–3, 14–12
Amaad Fareed	3–0	Reymark Begornia	11–9, 11–7, 11–5

28 August	Japan	3–0	Nepal

Tomotaka Endo	3–0	Arhant Keshar Simha	11–6, 11–3, 11–7
Ryunosuke Tsukue	3–0	Amrit Thapa Magar	11–0, 11–5, 11–5
Ryosei Kobayashi	3–0	Gyanu Chaudhary	11–3, 11–8, 11–4

29 August	South Korea	0–3	Japan

Lee Seung-taek	1–3	Ryosei Kobayashi	7–11, 11–1, 11–13, 6–11
Lee Se-hyun	2–3	Tomotaka Endo	11–9, 10–12, 3–11, 11–8, 4–11
Ko Young-jo	0–3	Ryunosuke Tsukue	6–11, 7–11, 3–11

29 August	Philippines	3–0	Nepal

Lydio Espinola	3–0	Gyanu Chaudhary	11–1, 11–6, 11–9
Reymark Begornia	3–0	Arhant Keshar Simha	11–5, 11–3, 11–7
David Pelino	3–0	Amrit Thapa Magar	11–3, 11–3, 11–2

29 August	Hong Kong	3–0	Pakistan

Yip Tsz Fung	3–0	Amaad Fareed	11–6, 11–5, 11–3
Leo Au	3–0	Israr Ahmed	11–8, 11–7, 11–4
Max Lee	3–1	Asim Khan	7–11, 11–5, 11–5, 14–12

30 August	Pakistan	3–0	South Korea

Tayyab Aslam	3–0	Lee Seung-taek	11–1, 11–5, 11–8
Israr Ahmed	3–0	Lee Nyeon-ho	11–5, 11–4, 11–8
Asim Khan	3–1	Ko Young-jo	11–8, 12–10, 10–12, 11–8

30 August	Japan	3–0	Philippines

Tomotaka Endo	3–0	David Pelino	12–10, 11–7, 13–11
Ryosei Kobayashi	3–1	Reymark Begornia	11–4, 8–11, 11–7, 11–5
Ryunosuke Tsukue	3–0	Robert Garcia	11–4, 11–8, 12–10

30 August	Hong Kong	3–0	Nepal

Yip Tsz Fung	3–0	Arhant Keshar Simha	11–5, 11–9, 11–6
Henry Leung	3–0	Rajendra Shakya	11–2, 11–5, 11–3
Leo Au	3–0	Amrit Thapa Magar	11–6, 11–3, 11–6

==== Pool B ====
Pos	Team	Pld	W	L	MF	MA	Pts	Qualification
1	Malaysia	5	5	0	13	2	10	Semifinals
2	India	5	4	1	12	3	8	Semifinals
3	Singapore	5	3	2	8	7	6	
4	Qatar	5	2	3	8	7	4	
5	Indonesia	5	1	4	4	11	2	
6	Thailand	5	0	5	0	15	0	

Source: Results

27 August	India	3–0	Indonesia

Harinder Pal Sandhu	3–0	Muhammad Nur Tastaftyan	11–9, 11–6, 11–7
Mahesh Mangaonkar	3–0	Andi Hasanudin	11–6, 11–2, 11–5
Ramit Tandon	3–0	Satria Bagus Laksana	11–4, 11–2, 11–5

27 August	Malaysia	3–0	Singapore

Ng Eain Yow	3–0	Timothy Leong	11–5, 11–2, 11–2
Mohd Syafiq Kamal	3–0	Benedict Chan	11–8, 11–7, 11–6
Ivan Yuen	3–0	Samuel Kang	12–10, 11–2, 12–10

27 August	Qatar	3–0	Thailand

Abdulla Al-Tamimi	3–0	Phuwis Poonsiri	11–3, 11–9, 25–23
Abdulrahman Al-Malki	3–0	Chattaporn Juntanayingyong	11–3, 11–4, 11–4
Syed Azlan Amjad	3–0	Natthakit Jivasuwan	11–6, 11–2, 11–2

27 August	India	3–0	Singapore

Harinder Pal Sandhu	3–0	Timothy Leong	11–7, 11–2, 11–7
Mahesh Mangaonkar	3–0	Pang Ka Hoe	11–3, 11–3, 11–1
Ramit Tandon	3–0	Samuel Kang	11–1, 11–3, 11–6

27 August	Malaysia	3–0	Thailand

Ng Eain Yow	3–0	Phuwis Poonsiri	11–2, 11–3, 11–4
Mohd Syafiq Kamal	3–0	Chattaporn Juntanayingyong	11–2, 11–0, 11–4
Ivan Yuen	3–0	Natthakit Jivasuwan	11–6, 11–1, 11–1

27 August	Qatar	2–1	Indonesia

Abdulla Al-Tamimi	3–0	Agung Wilant	11–3, 11–4, 11–5
Abdulrahman Al-Malki	1–3	Andi Hasanudin	11–9, 9–11, 5–11, 6–11
Syed Azlan Amjad	3–0	Muhammad Nur Tastaftyan	11–6, 11–3, 11–8

28 August	India	2–1	Qatar

Ramit Tandon	3–0	Syed Azlan Amjad	11–3, 11–5, 11–3
Harinder Pal Sandhu	0–3	Abdulla Al-Tamimi	8–11, 9–11, 8–11
Mahesh Mangaonkar	3–0	Abdulrahman Al-Malki	11–9, 11–6, 11–2

28 August	Malaysia	3–0	Indonesia

Ivan Yuen	3–0	Satria Bagus Laksana	11–7, 11–7, 11–5
Ng Eain Yow	3–0	Agung Wilant	11–4, 11–3, 11–4
Mohd Syafiq Kamal	3–0	Andi Hasanudin	11–6, 11–1, 11–5

28 August	Singapore	3–0	Thailand

Benedict Chan	3–0	Natthakit Jivasuwan	11–8, 11–8, 11–8
Timothy Leong	3–0	Arnold Phatraprasit	11–4, 11–6, 11–9
Pang Ka Hoe	3–0	Chattaporn Juntanayingyong	11–8, 11–2, 11–1

29 August	Malaysia	2–1	Qatar

Ivan Yuen	3–0	Hamad Al-Amri	11–6, 11–6, 11–4
Ng Eain Yow	3–0	Syed Azlan Amjad	11–4, 11–7, 11–6
Mohd Nafiizwan Adnan	0–3	Abdulla Al-Tamimi	4–11, 8–11, 2–11

29 August	Singapore	3–0	Indonesia

Pang Ka Hoe	3–0	Andi Hasanudin	11–3, 11–7, 13–11
Benedict Chan	3–1	Satria Bagus Laksana	11–7, 6–11, 11–6, 11–3
Samuel Kang	3–0	Agung Wilant	11–7, 11–1, 11–5

29 August	India	3–0	Thailand

Mahesh Mangaonkar	3–0	Natthakit Jivasuwan	11–0, 11–6, 11–2
Ramit Tandon	3–0	Arnold Phatraprasit	11–2, 11–3, 11–6
Saurav Ghosal	3–0	Phuwis Poonsiri	11–8, 11–4, 12–10

30 August	India	1–2	Malaysia

Harinder Pal Sandhu	2–3	Ng Eain Yow	11–7, 3–11, 11–8, 3–11, 3–11
Ramit Tandon	1–3	Ivan Yuen	8–11, 11–9, 10–12, 7–11
Saurav Ghosal	3–2	Mohd Nafiizwan Adnan	11–5, 9–11, 11–8, 12–14, 11–7

30 August	Qatar	1–2	Singapore

Syed Azlan Amjad	0–3	Samuel Kang	15–17, 4–11, 1–11
Abdulrahman Al-Malki	0–3	Benedict Chan	2–11, 4–11, 4–11
Abdulla Al-Tamimi	3–0	Timothy Leong	11–9, 11–7, 11–8

30 August	Indonesia	3–0	Thailand

Muhammad Nur Tastaftyan	3–1	Natthakit Jivasuwan	11–9, 11–8, 8–11, 11–7
Satria Bagus Laksana	3–0	Chattaporn Juntanayingyong	11–5, 11–5, 11–6
Agung Wilant	3–1	Arnold Phatraprasit	11–3, 11–7, 6–11, 11–5

=== Knockout round ===
Semifinals			Gold medal match
A1	Hong Kong	2
B2	India	0	A1	Hong Kong	1
B1	Malaysia	2	B1	Malaysia	2
A2	Pakistan	0

==== Semifinals ====
31 August	Hong Kong	2–0	India

Max Lee	3–0	Saurav Ghosal	11–6, 11–9, 13–11
Leo Au	3–1	Harinder Pal Sandhu	11–9, 9–11, 11–9, 11–3

31 August	Malaysia	2–0	Pakistan

Mohd Nafiizwan Adnan	3–0	Tayyab Aslam	11–8, 11–6, 11–6
Ng Eain Yow	3–1	Israr Ahmed	7–11, 11–8, 16–14, 11–6

==== Gold medal match ====
1 September	Hong Kong	1–2	Malaysia

Yip Tsz Fung	3–1	Ivan Yuen	11–7, 20–18, 9–11, 11–8
Max Lee	0–3	Mohd Nafiizwan Adnan	9–11, 7–11, 7–11
Leo Au	0–3	Ng Eain Yow	7–11, 7–11, 4–11
