= Squash at the 2022 Commonwealth Games – Men's doubles =

Boxing competitions

Squash – Men's doubles at the 2022 Commonwealth Games
- Venue: University of Birmingham Hockey and Squash Centre
- Dates: 4–8 August 2022
- Competitors: 50 from 20 nations

Medalists
gold medal	James Willstrop; Declan James	England
silver medal	Daryl Selby; Adrian Waller	England
bronze medal	Rory Stewart; Greg Lobban	Scotland

The Men's doubles squash competitions at the 2022 Commonwealth Games in Birmingham, England took place between August 4th and 8th at the University of Birmingham Hockey and Squash Centre. A total of 50 competitors from 25 nations took part.

== Schedule ==
The schedule is as follows:

Date	Round
Thursday 4 August	Round of 32
Friday 5 August	Round of 16
Saturday 6 August	Quarter-finals
Sunday 7 August	Semi-finals
Monday 8 August	Medal matches

== Results ==
The draw is as follows:

=== Finals ===
Semifinals
James Willstrop (ENG); Declan James (ENG)	5	11	11
Ng Eain Yow (MAS); Ivan Yuen (MAS)	11	5	8
Daryl Selby (ENG); Adrian Waller (ENG)	11	8	11
Rory Stewart (SCO); Greg Lobban (SCO)	8	11	6

Gold medal match
James Willstrop (ENG); Declan James (ENG)	11	7	11
Daryl Selby (ENG); Adrian Waller (ENG)	3	11	9
Bronze medal match
Ng Eain Yow (MAS); Ivan Yuen (MAS)	10	6
Rory Stewart (SCO); Greg Lobban (SCO)	11	11

=== Top half ===
Round of 32
Julian Jervis (CAY); Cameron Stafford (CAY)	11	8	9
Kijan Sultana (MLT); Niall Engerer (MLT)	4	11	11
Ravindu Laksiri (SRI); Shamil Wakeel (SRI)	11	11
Shomari Wiltshire (GUY); Jason-Ray Khalil (GUY)	5	6
Feanor Siaguru (PNG); Madako Suari (PNG)	8	9
Lwamba Chileshe (NZL); Temwa Chileshe (NZL)	11	11
Velavan Senthilkumar (IND); Abhay Singh (IND)	11	11
Joe Chapman (IVB); Luca Reich (IVB)	3	1

Round of 16
James Willstrop (ENG); Declan James (ENG)	11	11
Kijan Sultana (MLT); Niall Engerer (MLT)	2	1
Ravindu Laksiri (SRI); Shamil Wakeel (SRI)	7	7
Rhys Dowling (AUS); Cameron Pilley (AUS)	11	11
Ng Eain Yow (MAS); Ivan Yuen (MAS)	11	4	11
Lwamba Chileshe (NZL); Temwa Chileshe (NZL)	3	11	8
Velavan Senthilkumar (IND); Abhay Singh (IND)	8	11	11
Douglas Kempsell (SCO); Alan Clyne (SCO)	11	10	8

Quarterfinals
James Willstrop (ENG); Declan James (ENG)	11	11
Rhys Dowling (AUS); Cameron Pilley (AUS)	7	4
Ng Eain Yow (MAS); Ivan Yuen (MAS)	11	11
Velavan Senthilkumar (IND); Abhay Singh (IND)	8	8

Semifinals
James Willstrop (ENG); Declan James (ENG)	5	11	11
Ng Eain Yow (MAS); Ivan Yuen (MAS)	11	5	8

=== Bottom half ===
Round of 32
Shawn Simpson (BAR); Khamal Cumberbatch (BAR)	3	7
Mohammad Syafiq Kamal (MAS); Ong Sai Hung (MAS)	11	11
Nick Sachvie (CAN); David Baillargeon (CAN)	11	11
Paul Kadoma (UGA); Michael Kawooya (UGA)	2	1
Zac Alexander (AUS); Ryan Cuskelly (AUS)	11	11
Jake Kelly (CAY); Jace Jervis (CAY)	2	1
Othniel Bailey (SVG); Jason Doyle (SVG)	11	4	4
Christopher Binnie (JAM); Julian Morrison (JAM)	8	11	11
Tayyab Aslam (PAK); Nasir Iqbal (PAK)	11	11
Clement Anafo (GHA); Evans Ayih (GHA)	1	1

Round of 16
Daryl Selby (ENG); Adrian Waller (ENG)	9	11	11
Mohammad Syafiq Kamal (MAS); Ong Sai Hung (MAS)	11	4	7
Nick Sachvie (CAN); David Baillargeon (CAN)	11	11
Peter Creed (WAL); Emyr Evans (WAL)	8	5
Zac Alexander (AUS); Ryan Cuskelly (AUS)	11	11
Christopher Binnie (JAM); Julian Morrison (JAM)	5	5
Tayyab Aslam (PAK); Nasir Iqbal (PAK)	4	11	3
Rory Stewart (SCO); Greg Lobban (SCO)	11	10	11

Quarterfinals
Daryl Selby (ENG); Adrian Waller (ENG)	10	11	11
Nick Sachvie (CAN); David Baillargeon (CAN)	11	5	8
Zac Alexander (AUS); Ryan Cuskelly (AUS)	2	9
Rory Stewart (SCO); Greg Lobban (SCO)	11	11

Semifinals
Daryl Selby (ENG); Adrian Waller (ENG)	11	8	11
Rory Stewart (SCO); Greg Lobban (SCO)	8	11	6
