= Squash at the 2022 Commonwealth Games – Mixed doubles =

Boxing competitions

Squash – Mixed doubles at the 2022 Commonwealth Games
- Venue: University of Birmingham Hockey and Squash Centre
- Dates: 3–7 August 2022
- Competitors: 56 from 16 nations

Medalists
gold medal	Paul Coll; Joelle King	New Zealand
silver medal	Alison Waters; Adrian Waller	England
bronze medal	Dipika Pallikal; Saurav Ghosal	India

The Mixed doubles squash competitions at the 2022 Commonwealth Games in Birmingham, England will take place between August 3 and 7 at the University of Birmingham Hockey and Squash Centre. A total of 56 competitors from 16 nations took part.

== Schedule ==
The schedule is as follows:

Date	Round
Wednesday 3 August / Thursday 4 August	Round of 32
Thursday 4 August	Round of 16
Friday 5 August	Quarter-finals
Saturday 6 August	Semi-finals
Sunday 7 August	Medal matches

== Results ==
The draw is as follows:

=== Finals ===
Semifinals
Dipika Pallikal (IND); Saurav Ghosal (IND)	7	4
Paul Coll (NZL); Joelle King (NZL)	11	11
Donna Lobban (AUS); Cameron Pilley (AUS)	8	8
Alison Waters (ENG); Adrian Waller (ENG)	11	11

Gold medal match
Paul Coll (NZL); Joelle King (NZL)	11	11
Alison Waters (ENG); Adrian Waller (ENG)	3	6
Bronze medal match
Dipika Pallikal (IND); Saurav Ghosal (IND)	11	11
Donna Lobban (AUS); Cameron Pilley (AUS)	8	4

=== Top half ===
Round of 32
Ashley Khalil (GUY); Jason-Ray Khalil (GUY)	3	10
Emily Whitlock (WAL); Peter Creed (WAL)	11	11
Rachael Grinham (AUS); Zac Alexander (AUS)	11	11
Jade Pitcairn (CAY); Jake Kelly (CAY)	1	4
Lijana Sultana (MLT); Kijan Sultana (MLT)	6	10
Georgina Kennedy (ENG); Patrick Rooney (ENG)	11	11
Georgia Adderley (SCO); Rory Stewart (SCO)	11	11
Amanda Haywood (BAR); Shawn Simpson (BAR)	3	6
Charlotte Knaggs (TTO); Chayse Mc Quan (TTO)	7	4
Hollie Naughton (CAN); Nick Sachvie (CAN)	11	11
Faiza Zafar (PAK); Nasir Iqbal (PAK)	11	11
Chanithma Sinaly (SRI); Shamil Wakeel (SRI)	10	5

Round of 16
Dipika Pallikal (IND); Saurav Ghosal (IND)	11	11
Emily Whitlock (WAL); Peter Creed (WAL)	8	4
Rachael Grinham (AUS); Zac Alexander (AUS)	11	11
Georgina Kennedy (ENG); Patrick Rooney (ENG)	8	6
Georgia Adderley (SCO); Rory Stewart (SCO)	11	11
Hollie Naughton (CAN); Nick Sachvie (CAN)	10	6
Faiza Zafar (PAK); Nasir Iqbal (PAK)	4	3
Paul Coll (NZL); Joelle King (NZL)	11	11

Quarterfinals
Dipika Pallikal (IND); Saurav Ghosal (IND)	11	11
Rachael Grinham (AUS); Zac Alexander (AUS)	9	5
Georgia Adderley (SCO); Rory Stewart (SCO)	7	9
Paul Coll (NZL); Joelle King (NZL)	11	11

Semifinals
Dipika Pallikal (IND); Saurav Ghosal (IND)	7	4
Paul Coll (NZL); Joelle King (NZL)	11	11

=== Bottom half ===
Round of 32
Marlene West (CAY); Cameron Stafford (CAY)	11	11
Nicole Bunyan (CAN); David Baillargeon (CAN)	9	4
Joshna Chinappa (IND); Harinder Pal Sandhu (IND)	8	11	11
Yeheni Kuruppu (SRI); Ravindu Laksiri (SRI)	11	4	3
Amity Alarcos (PNG); Feanor Siaguru (PNG)	6	4
Donna Lobban (AUS); Cameron Pilley (AUS)	11	11
Tesni Evans (WAL); Joel Makin (WAL)	11	11
Colette Sultana (MLT); Niall Engerer (MLT)	6	2
Mary Fung-A-Fat (GUY); Shomari Wiltshire (GUY)	2	10
Addeen Idrakie (MAS); Ainaa Ampandi (MAS)	11	11
Amna Fayyaz (PAK); Tayyab Aslam (PAK)	6	6
Meagan Best (BAR); Khamal Cumberbatch (BAR)	11	11

Round of 16
Greg Lobban (SCO); Lisa Aitken (SCO)	11	11
Marlene West (CAY); Cameron Stafford (CAY)	4	7
Joshna Chinappa (IND); Harinder Pal Sandhu (IND)	8	9
Donna Lobban (AUS); Cameron Pilley (AUS)	11	11
Tesni Evans (WAL); Joel Makin (WAL)	11	11
Addeen Idrakie (MAS); Ainaa Ampandi (MAS)	6	8
Meagan Best (BAR); Khamal Cumberbatch (BAR)	1	4
Alison Waters (ENG); Adrian Waller (ENG)	11	11

Quarterfinals
Greg Lobban (SCO); Lisa Aitken (SCO)	11	8	8
Donna Lobban (AUS); Cameron Pilley (AUS)	9	11	11
Tesni Evans (WAL); Joel Makin (WAL)	11	8	5
Alison Waters (ENG); Adrian Waller (ENG)	4	11	11

Semifinals
Donna Lobban (AUS); Cameron Pilley (AUS)	8	8
Alison Waters (ENG); Adrian Waller (ENG)	11	11
