= Squash at the 2022 Asian Games – Men's singles =

Men's singles at the 2022 Asian Games
- Venue: Hangzhou Olympic Expo Squash Court
- Dates: 1–5 October 2023
- Competitors: 26 from 14 nations

Medalists
| gold medal | Ng Eain Yow | Malaysia |
| silver medal | Saurav Ghosal | India |
| bronze medal | Abdulla Al-Tamimi | Qatar |
| bronze medal | Henry Leung | Hong Kong |

The men's singles squash event was part of the squash programme and took place between 1 October and 5 October, at Hangzhou Olympic Sports Center.

== Schedule ==
All times are China Standard Time (UTC+08:00)

| Date | Time | Event |
|---|---|---|
| Sunday, 1 October 2023 | 15:00 | Round of 32 |
| Monday, 2 October 2023 | 15:00 | Round of 16 |
| Tuesday, 3 October 2023 | 16:00 | Quarterfinals |
| Wednesday, 4 October 2023 | 17:00 | Semifinals |
| Thursday, 5 October 2023 | 17:00 | Gold medal match |

== Results ==
=== Finals ===
| Semifinals | | | | | | Gold medal match |
| 1 | Ng Eain Yow (MAS) | 10 | 11 | 11 | 11 |
| 3 | Abdulla Al-Tamimi (QAT) | 12 | 7 | 9 | 5 | 1 | Ng Eain Yow (MAS) | 9 | 11 | 11 | 11 |
| 5 | Henry Leung (HKG) | 2 | 1 | 6 | | 2 | Saurav Ghosal (IND) | 11 | 9 | 5 | 7 |
| 2 | Saurav Ghosal (IND) | 11 | 11 | 11 |

=== Top half ===
==== Section 1 ====
Round of 32
Davaajavyn Güyen (MGL) | 2 | 1 | 3
11 | Syed Azlan Amjad (QAT) | 11 | 11 | 11
10 | Abdullah Al-Muzayen (KUW) | 11 | 11 | 11
Amrit Thapa Magar (NEP) | 4 | 2 | 5
Aaron Liang (SGP) | 11 | 9 | 4 | 6
7 | Asim Khan (PAK) | 4 | 11 | 11 | 11

Round of 16
1 | Ng Eain Yow (MAS) | 11 | 11 | 11
11 | Syed Azlan Amjad (QAT) | 3 | 1 | 2
10 | Abdullah Al-Muzayen (KUW) | 11 | 1 | 11 | 8 | 11
7 | Asim Khan (PAK) | 4 | 11 | 8 | 11 | 4

Quarterfinals
1 | Ng Eain Yow (MAS) | 14 | 11 | 11
10 | Abdullah Al-Muzayen (KUW) | 12 | 6 | 1

==== Section 2 ====
Round of 32
8 | Addeen Idrakie (MAS) | 11 | 11 | 11
Arhant Keshar Simha (NEP) | 5 | 3 | 3
Ravipun Limphaiboon (THA) | 1 | 2 | 4
12 | Ravindu Laksiri (SRI) | 11 | 11 | 11
13 | Nasir Iqbal (PAK) | 11 | 11 | 11
Natthapat Theerasilp (THA) | 7 | 6 | 3

Round of 16
8 | Addeen Idrakie (MAS) | 10 | 11 | 11 | 13
12 | Ravindu Laksiri (SRI) | 12 | 6 | 7 | 11
13 | Nasir Iqbal (PAK) | 9 | 8 | 6
3 | Abdulla Al-Tamimi (QAT) | 11 | 11 | 11

Quarterfinals
8 | Addeen Idrakie (MAS) | 2 | 7 | 2
3 | Abdulla Al-Tamimi (QAT) | 11 | 11 | 11

=== Bottom half ===
==== Section 3 ====
| Round of 32 | | | | | Round of 16 | | | | | | Quarterfinals |
| | | | | | 4 | Lau Tsz Kwan (HKG) | 11 | 9 | 11 | 11 |
| | Reymark Begornia (PHI) | 3 | 3 | 7 | 15 | Naoki Hayashi (JPN) | 3 | 11 | 4 | 4 |
| 15 | Naoki Hayashi (JPN) | 11 | 11 | 11 | | | | | | | 4 | Lau Tsz Kwan (HKG) | 8 | 8 | 10 |
| 16 | Marcus Phua (SGP) | 4 | 6 | 5 | | | | | | | 5 | Henry Leung (HKG) | 11 | 11 | 12 |
| | Na Joo-young (KOR) | 11 | 11 | 11 | | Na Joo-young (KOR) | 4 | 11 | 3 | 3 |
| | | | | | 5 | Henry Leung (HKG) | 11 | 8 | 11 | 11 |

==== Section 4 ====
| Round of 32 | | | | | | | Round of 16 | | | | | Quarterfinals |
| | | | | | | | 6 | Ryunosuke Tsukue (JPN) | 11 | 11 | 11 |
| | Jonathan Reyes (PHI) | 8 | 4 | 2 | | | 9 | Mahesh Mangaonkar (IND) | 6 | 2 | 6 |
| 9 | Mahesh Mangaonkar (IND) | 11 | 11 | 11 | | | | | | | | 6 | Ryunosuke Tsukue (JPN) | 5 | 10 | 3 |
| 14 | Ammar Al-Tamimi (KUW) | 4 | 12 | 11 | 4 | 11 | | | | | | 2 | Saurav Ghosal (IND) | 11 | 12 | 11 |
| | Lee Min-woo (KOR) | 11 | 10 | 8 | 11 | 9 | 14 | Ammar Al-Tamimi (KUW) | 4 | 4 | 6 |
| | | | | | | | 2 | Saurav Ghosal (IND) | 11 | 11 | 11 |
