= 2015 Men's Asian Individual Squash Championships =

2015 Asian Individual Squash Championships

Details
- Event name: 2015 Asian Individual Squash Championships
- Location: Kuwait
- Website www.squashsite.co.uk/2009/asianchamps2015.htm

The 2015 Men's Asian Individual Squash Championships is the men's edition of the 2015 Asian Individual Squash Championships, which serves as the individual Asian championship for squash players. The event took place in Kuwait from 1 to 5 May 2015. Leo Au won his first Asian Individual Championships title, defeating Abdullah Al Muzayen in the final.

== Seeds ==
1. (Hong Kong) Max Lee (quarterfinals)
2. (India) Saurav Ghosal (quarterfinals)
3. (Kuwait) Abdullah Al Muzayen (final)
4. (Hong Kong) Leo Au (champion)
5. (Malaysia) Mohd Nafiizwan Adnan (quarterfinals)
6. (India) Mahesh Mangaonkar (second round)
7. (Pakistan) Nasir Iqbal (semifinals)
8. (India) Harinder Pal Sandhu (second round)

== Draw and results ==
First round
1	(Hong Kong) Max Lee	11	11	11
Q	(Pakistan) Sayed Azlan Iqbal	6	5	5
Q	(South Korea) Ko Young-Jo	11	12	11	11
16	(Malaysia) Addeen Idrakie	6	14	7	7
11	(Pakistan) Farhan Zaman	11	11	11
Q	(Iran) Mohd Reza Pour	8	3	5
Q	(Kuwait) Falah Mohammad	5	9	1
8	(India) Harinder Pal Sandhu	11	11	11
6	(India) Mahesh Mangaonkar	11	11	11	11
Q	(South Korea) Park Jong-Myoung	7	13	7	1
Q	(China) Wang Jun Jie	3	5	3
10	(Hong Kong) Tsz Fung Yip	11	11	11
15	(Kuwait) Ammar Al-Tamimi	11	7	11	11
Q	(China) Shen Jia Qi	6	11	5	8
Q	(Malaysia) Sanjay Singh	11	5	0	4
4	(Hong Kong) Leo Au	7	11	11	11
3	(Kuwait) Abdullah Al Muzayen	11	11	11
Q	(South Korea) Lee Geon-Dong	5	3	4
Q	(Iraq) Hasanain Dakheel	5	7	11	6
14	(Pakistan) Tayyab Aslam	11	11	8	11
9	(Qatar) Abdulla Al-Tamimi	11	6	11	11
Q	(Iraq) Rasool Abdullah	4	11	3	8
Q	(Hong Kong) Wong Chi Him	8	4	6
5	(Malaysia) Mohd Nafi. Adnan	11	11	11
7	(Pakistan) Nasir Iqbal	11	11	11
Q	(Sri Lanka) Gihan Suwaris	4	1	5
Q	(Kuwait) Ali Al-Ramezi	6	7	7
13	(Malaysia) Ivan Yuen	11	11	11
12	(Pakistan) Danish Atlas Khan	11	11	11
Q	(Kuwait) Salem Mohammad	8	2	6
Q	(Qatar) Abdulrahman Al-Malki	4	2	3
2	(India) Saurav Ghosal	11	11	11

Second round
1	(Hong Kong) Max Lee	11	10	11	11
Q	(South Korea) Ko Young-Jo	7	12	5	5
11	(Pakistan) Farhan Zaman	8	4	11	11	11
8	(India) Harinder Pal Sandhu	11	11	9	6	7
6	(India) Mahesh Mangaonkar	10	4	2
10	(Hong Kong) Tsz Fung Yip	12	11	11
15	(Kuwait) Ammar Al-Tamimi	4	11	6	5
4	(Hong Kong) Leo Au	11	8	11	11
3	(Kuwait) Abdullah Al Muzayen	9	9	13
14	(Pakistan) Tayyab Aslam	11	11	15
9	(Qatar) Abdulla Al-Tamimi	11	7	11	6
5	(Malaysia) Mohd Nafi. Adnan	16	11	4	11
7	(Pakistan) Nasir Iqbal	12	5	11	11
13	(Malaysia) Ivan Yuen	10	11	6	6
12	(Pakistan) Danish Atlas Khan	4	9	8
2	(India) Saurav Ghosal	11	11	11

Quarter finals
1	(Hong Kong) Max Lee	10	9	13
11	(Pakistan) Farhan Zaman	12	11	15
10	(Hong Kong) Tsz Fung Yip	11	2	5	13
4	(Hong Kong) Leo Au	2	11	11	15
3	(Kuwait) Abdullah Al Muzayen	11	11	9	11
5	(Malaysia) Mohd Nafiizwan Adnan	5	6	11	8
7	(Pakistan) Nasir Iqbal	13	11	11	11
2	(India) Saurav Ghosal	15	7	4	5

Semi finals
11	(Pakistan) Farhan Zaman	11	9	13	16
4	(Hong Kong) Leo Au	5	11	15	18
Final
4	(Hong Kong) Leo Au	11	11	13
3	(Kuwait) Abdullah Al Muzayen	9	7	11
3	(Kuwait) Abdullah Al Muzayen	8	11	11	5	11
7	(Pakistan) Nasir Iqbal	11	9	9	11	6

== See also ==
- 2015 Women's Asian Individual Squash Championships
- Asian Individual Squash Championships

Preceded by Pakistan (Islamabad); 2013	Asian Squash Championships; Kuwait; 2015	Succeeded by Asian Championships; 2017
