= Squash at the 2022 Commonwealth Games =

- Venue: University of Birmingham Hockey and Squash Centre
- Dates: 29 July to 8 August 2022
- Competitors: 111 from 28 nations

Squash at the 2022 Commonwealth Games was the seventh appearance of the Squash at the Commonwealth Games. The squash events at the 2022 Commonwealth Games were held in Birmingham, England. It was the seventh edition since its debut in 1998, and the second staging within England specifically.

The competition is scheduled to take place between 29 July and 8 August 2022.

== Schedule ==
The competition schedule is as follows:

P	Preliminary matches	¼	Quarter-finals	½	Semi-finals	B	Bronze medal match	F	Gold medal match

Date Event	Fri 29		Sat 30		Sun 31		Mon 1		Tue 2	Wed 3			Thu 4		Fri 5		Sat 6		Sun 7			Mon 8	
Session →	A	E	A	E	A	E	A	E	E	M	E		A	E	A	E	A	E	A	E		M	
Men's singles							¼		½		B	F											
Men's doubles																	¼		½			B	F
Women's singles							¼		½		B	F											
Women's doubles																¼			½			B	F
Mixed doubles																¼	½			B	F		

== Venue ==
The competition will be held at the University of Birmingham Hockey and Squash Centre, where the hockey tournaments will also take place.

== Medal summary ==
=== Medal table ===
* Host nation (England)

Rank	CGA	Gold	Silver	Bronze	Total
1	New Zealand	3	0	0	3
2	England*	2	3	1	6
3	Canada	0	1	0	1
3	Wales	0	1	0	1
5	India	0	0	2	2
6	Malaysia	0	0	1	1
6	Scotland	0	0	1	1
Totals (7 entries)		5	5	5	15

=== Medalists ===
Event	Gold	Silver	Bronze
Men's singles	Paul Coll; New Zealand	Joel Makin; Wales	Saurav Ghosal; India
Women's singles	Georgina Kennedy; England	Hollie Naughton; Canada	Sarah-Jane Perry; England
Men's doubles	England; James Willstrop; Declan James	England; Adrian Waller; Daryl Selby	Scotland; Greg Lobban; Rory Stewart
Women's doubles	New Zealand; Joelle King; Amanda Landers-Murphy	England; Sarah-Jane Perry; Alison Waters	Malaysia; Rachel Arnold; Aifa Azman
Mixed doubles	New Zealand; Joelle King; Paul Coll	England; Alison Waters; Adrian Waller	India; Dipika Pallikal; Saurav Ghosal

== Participating nations ==
There were 28 participating Commonwealth Games Associations (CGA's) in squash with a total of 111 (64 men and 47 women) athletes. The number of athletes a nation entered is in parentheses beside the name of the country.

- Australia (8)
- Barbados (5)
- Bermuda (1)
- Botswana (2)
- British Virgin Islands (2)
- Canada (4)
- Cayman Islands (6)
- England (9)
- Fiji (1)
- Ghana (2)
- Gibraltar (1)
- Guyana (4)
- India (9)
- Jamaica (2)
- Kenya (2)
- Malaysia (9)
- Malta (4)
- New Zealand (7)
- Pakistan (4)
- Papua New Guinea (3)
- Saint Vincent and the Grenadines (4)
- Scotland (6)
- Seychelles (1)
- Sri Lanka (4)
- Trinidad and Tobago (2)
- Uganda (2)
- Wales (5)
- Zambia (2)
