= Squash at the 2017 World Games – Men's singles =

Squash Game

Squash men's singles at the 2017 World Games
- Venue: Hasta La Vista Squash Center; Wrocław, Poland
- Dates: 25–28 July 2017
- Competitors: 30 from 20 nations

Medalists
gold medal	(Germany) Simon Rösner
silver medal	(France) Grégoire Marche
bronze medal	(France) Mathieu Castagnet

The men's singles squash competition at the 2017 World Games took place from 25 to 28 July 2017 at the Hasta La Vista Squash Center in Wrocław, Poland.

== Seeds ==
1. (Germany) Simon Rösner (champion)
2. (Hong Kong) Max Lee (quarterfinals)
3. (Mexico) César Salazar (round of 16)
4. (Peru) Diego Elías (Fourth place)

== Results ==
Round of 32
1	(Germany) Simon Rösner	3
(Poland) Wojciech Nowisz	0
(Czech Republic) Daniel Mekbib	2
9/16	(Australia) Rhys Dowling	3
9/16	(Malaysia) Ivan Yuen	3
(Finland) Matias Tuomi	0
(Romania) Vasile Hapun	0
5/8	(Colombia) Miguel Ángel Rodríguez	3
(British Virgin Islands) Joe Chapman	1
9/16	(United Kingdom) Douglas Kempsell	3
9/16	(Germany) Raphael Kandra	3
(Egypt) Ahmed Hany	0
(Hungary) Balázs Farkas	2
3/4	(Mexico) César Salazar	3
3/4	(Peru) Diego Elías	3
(Australia) Alex Eustace	0
(United Kingdom) Ben Coleman	3
(Italy) Yuri Farneti	0
(Ukraine) Konstiantyn Rybalchenko	0
5/8	(Hong Kong) Yip Tsz Fung	3
5/8	(France) Grégoire Marche	3
(Poland) Mateusz Kotra	0
(United Kingdom) Rory Stewart	3
9/16	(Egypt) Shehab Essam	0
9/16	(United Kingdom) Joshua Masters	1
(Czech Republic) Jan Koukal	3
(Russia) Alexey Severinov	0
2	(Hong Kong) Max Lee	3

Round of 16
1	(Germany) Simon Rösner	3
9/16	(Australia) Rhys Dowling	0
9/16	(Malaysia) Ivan Yuen	1
5/8	(Colombia) Miguel Ángel Rodríguez	3
5/8	(France) Mathieu Castagnet	3
9/16	(United Kingdom) Douglas Kempsell	1
9/16	(Germany) Raphael Kandra	3
3/4	(Mexico) César Salazar	0
3/4	(Peru) Diego Elías	3
9/16	(Malaysia) Mohd Nafiizwan Adnan	1
(United Kingdom) Ben Coleman	2
5/8	(Hong Kong) Yip Tsz Fung	3
5/8	(France) Grégoire Marche	3
(United Kingdom) Rory Stewart	1
(Czech Republic) Jan Koukal	0
2	(Hong Kong) Max Lee	3

Quarter finals
1	(Germany) Simon Rösner	3
5/8	(Colombia) Miguel Ángel Rodríguez	2
5/8	(France) Mathieu Castagnet	3
9/16	(Germany) Raphael Kandra	2
3/4	(Peru) Diego Elías	3
5/8	(Hong Kong) Yip Tsz Fung	1
5/8	(France) Grégoire Marche	3
2	(Hong Kong) Max Lee	0

Semi finals
1	(Germany) Simon Rösner	3
5/8	(France) Mathieu Castagnet	1
3/4	(Peru) Diego Elías	0
5/8	(France) Grégoire Marche	3

Finals
1	(Germany) Simon Rösner	3
5/8	(France) Grégoire Marche	1

3rd place
5/8	(France) Mathieu Castagnet	3
3/4	(Peru) Diego Elías	0
