= Shamil Wakeel =

Sri Lankan squash player

Personal information
- Full name: Mohomed Shamil Mukthar Wakeel

Sport
- Country: Sri Lanka

Mohomed Shamil Mukthar Wakeel is a Sri Lankan professional squash player. He is also employed at Brandix. He studied at the D. S. Senanayake College.

== Career ==
He represented Sri Lanka at the 2016 South Asian Games, which marked his maiden appearance at the South Asian Games. He represented Sri Lanka at the 2018 Asian Games, which also eventually marked his debut appearance at the Asian Games. He competed in the men's singles event at the 2018 Asian Games and lost to India's Saurav Ghosal in round of 32 match.

He emerged as the winner in the Under-19 boys category at the 28th edition of the National Squash Championships in 2018. He participated at the 2018 Men's Asian Team Squash Championships and he won the 13th place play-off. He alongside Ravindu Laksiri competed at the 2019 World Squash Doubles Championships, which also marked the duo's first appearance at the World Squash Doubles Championships. He was part of the Sri Lanka men's squash team which claimed bronze medal at the 2019 South Asian Games. Prior to the start of the 2019 South Asian Games, he was sent by Sri Lanka Squash for an advanced training in Malaysia.

He also took part in the 2021 Men's Asian Individual Squash Championships. He was named in Sri Lanka's squad for the 2021 Men's Asian Team Squash Championships and Sri Lanka secured victories over Singapore and Indonesia to claim 10th position in the tournament. He along with Ravindu Laksiri competed at the 2022 World Squash Doubles Championships which was held in Glasgow.

In October 2022, he reached the quarterfinals in men's singles at the 2022 Randburg Open (as part of the 2022–23 PSA World Tour) which was held in South Africa. He represented Sri Lanka at the 2022 Commonwealth Games, where he made his maiden Commonwealth Games appearance. He competed in the men's singles, men's doubles and mixed doubles categories during the 2022 Commonwealth Games.

He represented Sri Lanka at the 2022 Asian Games and competed in the mixed doubles event partnering with Chanithma Sinaly. He participated at the 2023 Pennant Hills NSW Open which was held in Pennant Hills, New South Wales. He defeated Australia's Jack Hudson in the men's singles final during the 2023 Pennant Hills NSW Open.
