= Colombian Open (squash) 2015 =

Colombian Open 2015
- 18th Colombian Open

Details
- Event name: Abierto Colombiano de Squash Club El Nogal 2015
- Location: Bogotá Colombia
- Venue: Club El Nogal
- Website www.abiertocolombianopsa.com

Men's Winner
- Category: International 50
- Prize money: $50,000
- Year: World Tour 2015

The Colombian Open 2015 is the men's edition of the 2015 Colombian Open, which is a tournament of the PSA World Tour event International (Prize money : 50 000 $). The event took place in Bogotá in Colombia from 5 to 8 August. Alfredo Ávila won his first Colombian Open trophy, beating Saurav Ghosal in the final.

== Prize money and ranking points ==
For 2015, the prize purse was $50,000. The prize money and points breakdown is as follows:

Prize Money Colombian Open (2015)
Event	W	F	SF	QF	1R
Points (PSA)	875	575	350	215	125
Prize money	$8,550	$5,850	$3,825	$2,360	$1,350

== Seeds ==
1. (Colombia) Miguel Ángel Rodríguez (semifinals)
2. (Germany) Peter Barker (semifinals)
3. (Spain) Borja Golán (quarterfinals)
4. (Egypt) Marwan El Shorbagy (first round)
5. (Egypt) Fares Dessouky (first round)
6. (India) Saurav Ghosal (final)
7. (Mexico) César Salazar (quarterfinals)
8. (Egypt) Zahed Mohamed (quarterfinals)

== Draw and results ==
First round
1	(Colombia) Miguel Á. Rodríguez	12	11	11
(South Africa) Shaun Le Roux	10	5	9
Q	(United States) Todd Harrity	9	7	11	6
8	(Egypt) Zahed Mohamed	11	11	9	11
6	(India) Saurav Ghosal	11	11	11
WC	(Colombia) Sebastian Laguna	3	1	3
(Peru) Diego Elías	9	11	11	11
4	(Egypt) Marwan El Shorbagy	11	5	6	2
3	(Spain) Borja Golán	11	11	11
Q	(Egypt) Karim El Hammamy	2	5	2
Q	(Mexico) Alfredo Ávila	11	11	11
5	(Egypt) Fares Dessouky	7	6	7
7	(Mexico) César Salazar	11	11	11	11
(France) Lucas Serme	7	5	13	6
Q	(Hong Kong) Tsz Fung Yip	5	7	3
2	(England) Peter Barker	11	11	11

Quarter finals
1	(Colombia) Miguel Á. Rodríguez	12	9	11	11
8	(Egypt) Zahed Mohamed	10	11	2	8
6	(India) Saurav Ghosal	8	11	11	11
(Peru) Diego Elías	11	9	6	3
3	(Spain) Borja Golán	11	9	9	9
Q	(Mexico) Alfredo Ávila	6	11	11	11
7	(Mexico) César Salazar	4	rtd
2	(England) Peter Barker	11

Semi finals
1	(Colombia) Miguel Ángel Rodríguez	8	10	11	11	10
6	(India) Saurav Ghosal	11	12	7	3	12
Q	(Mexico) Alfredo Ávila	8	7	11	11	11
2	(England) Peter Barker	11	11	9	1	2

Final
6	(India) Saurav Ghosal	9	11	4	8
Q	(Mexico) Alfredo Ávila	11	8	11	11

== See also ==
- PSA World Tour 2015
- Colombian Open
