= Japan men's national squash team =

Japan
- Coach: Kimihiko Sano
- Association: Japan Squash Association
- Colors: White

World Team Championships
- First year: 1983
- Titles: 0
- Runners-up: 0
- Best finish: 17th
- Entries: 12

Asian Team Championships
- Titles: 0
- Runners-up: 0

The Japan men's national squash team represents Japan in international squash team competitions, and is governed by Japan Squash Association.

== Current team ==
- Shinnosuke Tsukue
- Yuta Fukui
- Ryosei Kobayashi
- Ben Takamizawa Harris
- Tomotaka Endo

== Results ==
=== World Team Squash Championships ===
Year	Result	Position	W	L
(Australia) Melbourne 1967	Did not present			
(England) Birmingham 1969	Did not present			
(New Zealand) Palmerston North 1971	Did not present			
(South Africa) Johannesburg 1973	Did not present			
(England) Birmingham 1976	Did not present			
(Canada) Toronto 1977	Did not present			
(Australia) Brisbane 1979	Did not present			
(Sweden) Stockholm 1981	Did not present			
(New Zealand) Auckland 1983	Group Stage	17th	2	4
(Egypt) Cairo 1985	Did not present			
(England) London 1987	Did not present			
Singapore 1989	Group Stage	24th	1	7
(Finland) Helsinki 1991	Group Stage	22nd	1	3
(Pakistan) Karachi 1993	Group Stage	28th	0	4
(Egypt) Cairo 1995	Group Stage	30th	2	4
(Malaysia) Petaling Jaya 1997	Group Stage	27th	3	3
(Egypt) Cairo 1999	Group Stage	26th	2	5
(Australia) Melbourne 2001	Group Stage	23rd	1	5
(Austria) Vienna 2003	Group Stage	24th	1	5
(Pakistan) Islamabad 2005	Did not present			
(India) Chennai 2007	Group Stage	20th	2	4
(Denmark) Odense 2009	Group Stage	25th	3	3
(Germany) Paderborn 2011	Did not present			
(France) Mulhouse 2013	Group Stage	22nd	3	4
(Egypt) Cairo 2015	Did not present			
Total	12/24	0 Title	21	51

=== Asian Squash Team Championships ===
Year	Result	Position
(Pakistan) Karachi 1981	Not in the Top 4	
(Jordan) Amman 1984	Not in the Top 4	
(Malaysia) Kuala Lumpur 1986	Not in the Top 4	
Kuwait City 1988	Not in the Top 4	
(India) Kolkata 1990	Not in the Top 4	
(Pakistan) Peshawar 1992	Not in the Top 4	
(Malaysia) Kuala Lumpur 1994	Not in the Top 4	
(Jordan) Amman 1996	Not in the Top 4	
(Malaysia) Kuala Lumpur 1998	Not in the Top 4	
Hong Kong 2000	Not in the Top 4	
(Malaysia) Kuala Lumpur 2002	Not in the Top 4	
(Malaysia) Kuala Lumpur 2004	Not in the Top 4	
(Chinese Taipei) Taiwan 2006	Not in the Top 4	
Kuwait City 2008	Not in the Top 4	
(India) Chennai 2010	Not in the Top 4	
Kuwait City 2012	Not in the Top 4	
Total	/	

== See also ==
- World Team Squash Championships
- Japan women's national squash team
