= Philippines men's national squash team =

Philippines
- Coach: Ricky Espinola
- Association: Squash Rackets Association of the Philippines
- Colors: Blue, Red, White

World Team Championships
- Titles: 0
- Runners-up: 0

Asian Team Championships
- Titles: 0
- Runners-up: 0

The Philippines men's national squash team represents Philippines in international squash team competitions, and is governed by Squash Rackets Association of the Philippines.

== Current team ==
- Robert Andrew Garcia
- Reymark Begornia
- David William Pelino
- Lydio Espinola Jr

== Results ==
=== World Team Squash Championships ===
| Year | Result | Position | W | L |
|---|---|---|---|---|
| (Australia) Melbourne 1967 – (France) Marseille 2017 | Did not participate | | | |
| Total | 0/24 | 0 Title | 0 | 0 |

=== Asian Squash Team Championships ===
| Year | Result | Position |
|---|---|---|
| (Pakistan) Karachi 1981 | Not in the Top 4 | 6th |
| (Jordan) Amman 1984 – (Pakistan) Peshawar 1992 | Did not participate | |
| (Malaysia) Kuala Lumpur 1994 | Not in the Top 4 | 8th |
| (Jordan) Amman 1996 | Did not participate | |
| (Malaysia) Kuala Lumpur 1998 | Not in the Top 4 | 9th |
| Hong Kong 2000 | Not in the Top 4 | 8th |
| (Malaysia) Kuala Lumpur 2002 | Not in the Top 4 | 8th |
| (Malaysia) Kuala Lumpur 2004 – Kuwait City 2012 | Did not participate | |
| Hong Kong 2014 | Group stage | 15th |
| (Chinese Taipei) Taipei 2016 | Group stage | 10th |
| (South Korea) Cheongju 2018 | Group stage | 9th |
| Total | x0 - x0 - x0 | |

Asian Squash Federation

=== Asian Games ===
| Year | Result | Position | W | L |
|---|---|---|---|---|
| (China) Guangzhou 2010 | Did not participate | | | |
| (South Korea) Incheon 2014 | Did not participate | | | |
| (Indonesia) Jakarta–Palembang 2018 | To be determined | | | |
| Total | x0 - x0 - x0 | | | |

=== Southeast Asian Games ===
| Year | Result | Position |
|---|---|---|
| (Malaysia) Penang 2001 | Semifinal | 3rd |
| Singapore 2015 | Semifinal | 3rd |
| (Malaysia) Kuala Lumpur 2017 | Final | 2nd |
| Total | x0 - x1 - x2 | |

== See also ==
- Squash Rackets Association of the Philippines
- World Team Squash Championships
