= Ramit Tandon =

Indian squash player

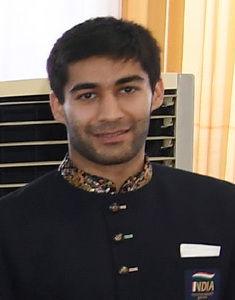

Personal information
- Full name: Ramit Tandon
- Born: 21 August 1992 (age 34) Kolkata, India
- Education: Columbia University
- Height: 178 cm (5 ft 10 in)
- Weight: 70 kg (154 lb)

Sport
- Country: India
- Handedness: Right-handed
- Club: Columbia Lions; (2011–2015); Philadelphia Lightning; (2025–present); Newport Dragons; (2025–present)
- Turned pro: 2018
- Coached by: David Palmer; Hesham El Attar
- Racquet used: Tecnifibre

Men's singles
- Highest ranking: 28 (October 2024)
- Current ranking: 32 (14 July 2025)
- Title: 4
- Tour final: 8
- PSA Profile
Medal record
Men's squash
Representing India
Asian Games
Bronze medal – third place	2018 Jakarta	Men's team
Asian Championships
Gold medal – first place	2022 Cheongju	Men's team
Silver medal – second place	2021 Kuala Lumpur	Men's team
Asian Junior Championships
Gold medal – first place	2011 Colombo	Boys' team
Silver medal – second place	2011 Amman	Boys' individual
- Updated on September 2024

Ramit Tandon (born 21 August 1992) is an Indian professional squash player. He is a bronze medalist at the Asian Games and a gold and a silver medalist at the Asian Team Championships. As of Oct 2024, Tandon is ranked 28th in world rankings.

He turned pro in 2018 and has won four tour titles since. He is India's number one and Asia's number three ranked male player.

== Early life ==
Tandon completed his education from Sishya School, Chennai and moved to the United States to continue his education at Columbia University, New York. He became a part of the college's squash team Columbia Lions. He was ranked #2 in university squash, won the Skillman Award given for sportsmanship and good conduct on and off the court and captained the team. He also became the MVP four times and won the Maniatty Award, given to the best student-athlete. Tandon graduated with a BA in statistics.

After graduating, he worked in the finance industry for a few years before stepping into the professional squash world. Off the court, he is seen at fashion shows, Ted Talks and as a guest speaker at several events.

== Career ==
In 2011, Tandon won the U-19 boys singles title at the Asian Junior Championships. He was part of the bronze medalist men's team at the 2018 edition of the Asian Games.

In 2021, he was a part of the men's team that clinched the silver medal at the Asian Team Championships. Tandon was also a part of the gold medalist men's team at the 2022 edition. The win was historic as it was the first time the team had won the title.

== Titles and finals ==
Year	Tournament	Opponent	Result	Score	Ref
2002	Singapore Junior Open	(India) Aditya Jagtap	Win	3–0 (9-0, 9-0, 9-2)	
2003	Scottish Junior Open	(England) Robert Downer	Win	3–1 (5-9, 9-5, 9-0, 9-2)	
2017	SYS Open	(India) Kush Kumar	Win	3–0 (11-3, 11-2, 11-3)	
2017	Singapore Open	(Chinese Taipei) James Huang	Win	3–0 (11-3, 11-6, 11-3)	
2018	Abu Dhabi Squash Open	(Egypt) Omar Abdel Meguid	Win	3–1 (11-6, 6-11, 11-3, 11-2)	
2019	Seattle Open	(Egypt) Mohamed ElSherbini	Win	3–1 (11-4, 11-7, 2-11, 11-2)	
2019	EM Noll Classic	(Egypt) Youssef Ibrahim	Loss	1–1 (8-11, 11-5, 2-0 rtd)	

== See also ==
- Squash in India
- India men's national squash team
