= Philippine Squash Academy =

Sports governing body in the Philippines

- Sport: Squash
- Abbreviation: PSA
- Regional affiliation: Asian Squash Federation
- President: Bob Bachmann
- Secretary: Vince Abad Santos
- (Philippines)

The Philippine Squash Academy (PSA) is the governing body of squash in the Philippines.

Logo of SRAP

The PSA's predecessor is the Squash Rackets Association of the Philippines (SRAP) which was established in 1975. The SRAP was a regular member of Philippine Olympic Committee, Asian Squash Federation, and the World Squash Federation (WSF).

With consent from the WSF and POC, the PSA was named as the national sports association for squash in 2016 due to pending accountabilities related to SRAP.
