= Alireza Shameli =

Iranian squash player (born 1999)

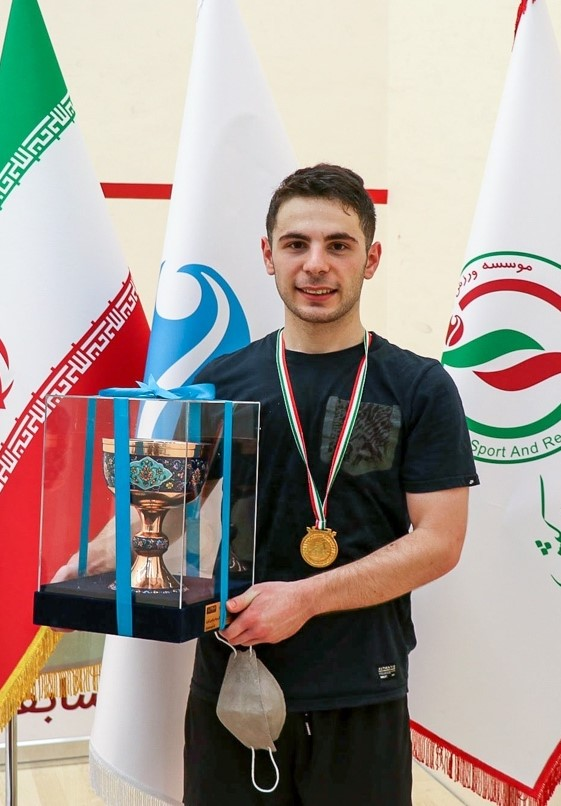

Personal information
- Born: May 23, 1999 (age 27) Kish Island, Iran
- Height: 1.70
- Weight: 70

Sport
- Country: Iran
- Handedness: Right Handed
- Turned pro: 2013
- Retired: Active

Men's singles
- Highest ranking: No. 98 (April 2022)
- Current ranking: No. 810 (August 2026)
- Title: 4
- Tour final: 4
- Updated on January 2022

Alireza Shameli (Persian: علیرضا شاملی;born 23 May 1999 in Kish Island) is an Iranian professional squash player. As of August 2026 he was ranked # 810 in the world; as of April 2022 he had been ranked number 98 in the world, his highest ranking. Shameli has also won the national championship title seven times. He won the 2021 Kish Yasi Cup. the Ramadan cup in 2021, the commemoration of the martyrs of the Iranian navy army in 2022, the Zahra dental clinic in 2022, and the Kish National Close in 2022.

In addition, Shameli has also earned notable awards and accomplishments. He won the bronze medal in the 19th Asian team championship and was a bronze medalist in the 24th Asian Junior Individual Championship in 2017. He also won a bronze medal in the 22nd Asian junior Individual Championship in 2015.
