= Amaad Fareed =

Pakistani squash player (born 1996)

Personal information
- Born: 5 March 1996 (age 30) Lahore, Pakistan

Sport
- Country: Pakistan
- Retired: Active

Men's singles
- Highest ranking: No. 112 (November 2014)
- Current ranking: No. 175 (February 2018)
Medal record
Men's squash
Representing Pakistan
Asian Games
Bronze medal – third place	2018 Jakarta	Team
Asian Championships
Silver medal – second place	2018 Cheongju	Team
South Asian Games
Gold medal – first place	2019 Nepal	Team
- Updated on February, 2018

Amaad Fareed (born 5 March 1996 in Lahore) is a Pakistani professional squash player. As of February 2018, he was ranked number 175 in the world. He was a member of Pakistan's bronze-winning squash team at the 2018 Asian Games.
