= Navid Maleksabet =

Iranian squash player (born 1991)

Personal information
- Born: 11 August 1991 (age 35) Yazd, Iran
- Height: 187 cm (6 ft 2 in)
- Weight: 80 kg (176 lb)

Sport
- Country: Iran
- Turned pro: 2009
- Retired: Active
- Racquet used: Dunlop

Men's singles
- Highest ranking: No. 162 (July 2018)
- Current ranking: not ranked (August 2026)
- Title: 1
- Tour final: 1
- Updated on February 2018

Navid Maleksabet (born 11 August 1991 in Yazd) is an Iranian professional squash player. As of August 2026, he was not ranked in the world. His first professional title was the 2017 Amir Kabir Cup.
