= Rory Stewart (squash player) =

Scottish squash player (born 1996)

Personal information
- Born: 19 July 1996 (age 30) Perth, Scotland

Sport
- Country: British (Scottish)
- Retired: Active
- Racquet used: Unsquashable

Men's singles
- Highest ranking: No. 40 (December 2023)
- Current ranking: No. 54 (April 2025)
- Title: 10
Medal record
Men's squash
Representing Scotland
Commonwealth Games
Bronze medal – third place	2022 Birmingham	Doubles
World Doubles Championships
Silver medal – second place	2022 Glasgow	Doubles

Rory Stewart (born 19 July 1996) is a professional squash player who represented Scotland at the Commonwealth Games. He reached a career high ranking of 40 in the world during December 2023.

== Biography ==
Stewart has competed in multiple professional squash tournaments and has represented Scotland internationally.

He represented the Scottish team at the 2022 Commonwealth Games in the Birmingham, England, where he competed in the three events. Partnering Greg Lobban they won a bronze medal in the men's doubles.

In April 2025, Stewart won his 10th PSA title after securing victory in the Edinburgh Open during the 2024–25 PSA Squash Tour.
