= Farhan Zaman =

Pakistani squash player (born 1992)

Personal information
- Full name: Farhan Zaman
- Born: March 9, 1992 (age 34) Peshawar, Pakistan
- Height: 1.74 m (5 ft 9 in)
- Weight: 59 kg (130 lb)

Sport
- Country: Pakistan
- Turned pro: 2010
- Coached by: Fakhar Zaman, Faheem Zaman
- Retired: Active
- Racquet used: Prince, Titan

Men's singles
- Highest ranking: No. 47 (January 2017)
- Current ranking: No. 76 (December 2017)
Medal record
Men's squash
Representing Pakistan
Asian Games
Silver medal – second place	2022 Hangzhou	Team
Asian Championships
Gold medal – first place	2016 New Taipei City	Team
Gold medal – first place	2014 Hong Kong	Team
Gold medal – first place	2012 Kuwait City	Team
Silver medal – second place	2018 Cheongju	Team
South Asian Games
Gold medal – first place	2016 Guwahati	Singles
- Updated on December 2017

Farhan Zaman (born 9 March 1992 in Peshawar) is a professional squash player who represents Pakistan. He reached a career-high PSA ranking of World No. 47 in January 2017. He reached No. 3 in Junior Squash. He currently resides in Peshawar, Pakistan.
