= Saurav Ghosal =

Indian squash player (born 1986)

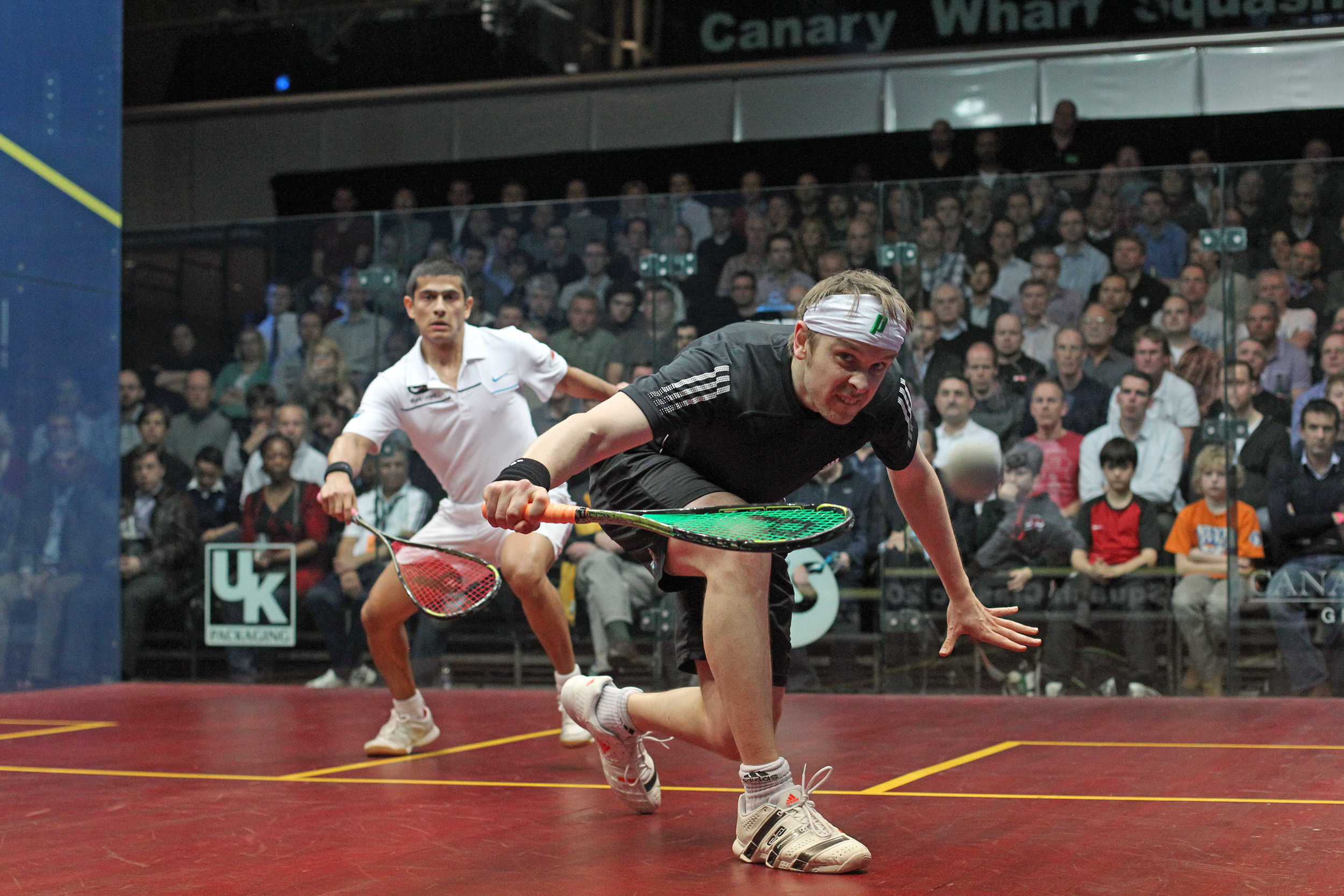
- Ghoshal (in left) in action against James Willstrop in 2012

Personal information
- Born: 10 August 1986 (age 40) Kolkata, West Bengal, India
- Height: 5 ft 6 in (1.68 m)
- Weight: 65 kg (143 lb)
- Spouse: Diya Pallikal (m. 2017)

Sport
- Country: India
- Turned pro: 2003
- Coached by: Malcolm Willstrop; S. Maniam; Cyrus Poncha
- Racquet used: Head

Men's singles
- Highest ranking: 10 (April 2019)
- Current ranking: 340 (October 2025)
- Title: 11
- World Open: QF (2013)
- PSA Profile
Medal record
Men's squash
Representing India
Event	1st	2nd	3rd
World Championships	2	2	0
World Cup	0	0	1
Commonwealth Games	0	1	2
Asian Games	2	2	5
Asian Championships	2	2	0
South Asian Games	1	1	0
Asian Junior Championships	0	1	0
Total	7	9	8
World Championships
Gold medal – first place	2022 Glasgow	Mixed doubles
Gold medal – first place	2024 Glasgow	Mixed doubles
Silver medal – second place	2004 Chennai	Doubles
Silver medal – second place	2016 Darwin	Mixed doubles
World Cup
Bronze medal – third place	2023 Chennai	Mixed team
Commonwealth Games
Silver medal – second place	2018 Gold Coast	Mixed doubles
Bronze medal – third place	2022 Birmingham	Singles
Bronze medal – third place	2022 Birmingham	Mixed doubles
Asian Games
Gold medal – first place	2014 Incheon	Team
Gold medal – first place	2022 Hangzhou	Team
Silver medal – second place	2014 Incheon	Singles
Silver medal – second place	2022 Hangzhou	Singles
Bronze medal – third place	2006 Doha	Singles
Bronze medal – third place	2010 Guangzhou	Singles
Bronze medal – third place	2010 Guangzhou	Team
Bronze medal – third place	2018 Jakarta	Singles
Bronze medal – third place	2018 Jakarta	Team
Asian Championships
Gold medal – first place	2019 Kuala Lumpur	Singles
Gold medal – first place	2022 Cheongju	Team
Silver medal – second place	2017 Chennai	Singles
Silver medal – second place	2021 Kuala Lumpur	Team
South Asian Games
Gold medal – first place	2016 Guwahati	Team
Silver medal – second place	2016 Guwahati	Singles
Asian Junior Championships
Silver medal – second place	2005 Chennai	Singles

Saurav Ghosal (Bengali: সৌরভ ঘোষাল; born 10 August 1986) is an Indian squash player. He reached a career-high ranking of World No.10 in 2019.

== Career ==
In 2013, Ghosal became the first Indian to reach the Quarter finals of the World Squash Championship at Manchester, England. In 2004, he became the first Indian ever to win the coveted British Junior Open Under-19 Squash title, defeating Adel El Said of Egypt in the final at Sheffield, England.

Ghosal moved to Chennai after completing his school and was based at the ICL squash academy in Chennai and coached by Major (Rtd) Maniam and Cyrus Poncha in Chennai, India. Currently based in Leeds, he trains with Malcolm Willstrop at Pontefract Squash Club in West Yorkshire. Saurav is the current Indian national champion after he defeated Gaurav Nandrajog at the National Championships 2006 in New Delhi. As of May 2010, his PSA world rank is 27. In the top 100 in the world are two of his Indian Squash Colleagues Siddharth Suchde (80) and Harinder Pal Sandhu (90).

Ghosal won the bronze medal at the Asian Games 2006 Doha and was awarded the Arjuna Award by the President of India in August 2007, thus becoming the first squash player from the country to get the award.

Ghosal started playing squash in his hometown of Kolkata, at the Kolkata Racquet Club. He studied from the Lakshmipat Singhania Academy, before moving to Chennai to join the ICL Squash Academy. Here he was coached by retired Major Maniam and Cyrus Poncha.

Ghosal has numerous firsts to his credit, the first Indian to be ranked junior World No one, the first to bag the junior National championship three years in a row and in December 2006, he won the country the first medal in squash in the Doha Asian Games. His first major title was the German Open (U-17) in May 2002 and he won the Dutch Open two months later.

In 2013, he became the first Indian squash player to reach the quarter-finals of the World Championship. In 2014, he won the silver medal (individual singles) in the 17th Asian Games at Incheon. He was the first Indian squash player to do so. He lost in the final to Abdullah Al-Muzayen of Kuwait. He however led the Indian Squash team to its first ever gold medal at Incheon. In the final he bounced back from a game down to eke out a 6-11 11-7 11-6 12-14 11–9 win over former world no. 7, Ong Beng Hee in a gruelling 88-minute clash to give India a healthy 2–0 lead.

Ghosal also remains the first Indian player to claim a place in the world's top 10 during the 2018-19 campaign.

Saurav Ghosal has been named as the Professional Squash Association's (PSA) Men's President as one of three new additions to the PSA's Board of Directors, which were officially confirmed at the association's annual AGM on Wednesday 22 December 2021.

In August 2022, Ghosal became the first Indian men's squash singles medallist at the 2022 Commonwealth Games after he beat 2018 reigning champion James Willstrop of England in straight sets in the bronze medal playoff to take the bronze medal. He defeated Shamil Wakeel of Sri Lanka 11–4, 11–4, 11–6 in the second round, beat David Baillargeon of Canada 11–6, 11–2, 11–6 in the third round. In the quarter-final, he recovered from a defeat in the second set to see off Scotland's Greg Lobban 11–5, 8–11, 11–7, 11–3 before falling to New Zealand's world no. 2 and eventual gold medallist Paul Coll 9–11, 4–11, 1–11 in the semi-final.

In February 2025, Ghosal won his 11th PSA title after securing victory in the Sydney Classic during the 2024–25 PSA Squash Tour.

== Personal life ==
Saurav married Diya Pallikal (sister of Dipika Pallikal Karthik) on 1 February 2017.
