= Rhys Dowling =

Australian squash player (born 1995)

Personal information
- Born: 25 March 1995 (age 31) Darwin, Australia

Sport
- Country: Australian
- Handedness: Left Handed
- Turned pro: 2010
- Retired: Active
- Racquet used: Grays

Men's singles
- Highest ranking: No. 93 (February 2018)
- Current ranking: No. 145 (April 2025)

Rhys Dowling (born 25 March 1995 in Darwin) is an Australian professional squash player. He reached a career high ranking of 93 in the world during February 2018.

In April 2025, Dowling won his 7th PSA title after securing victory in the World Championship Qualifiers during the 2024–25 PSA Squash Tour.
