= Greg Lobban =

Scottish squash player

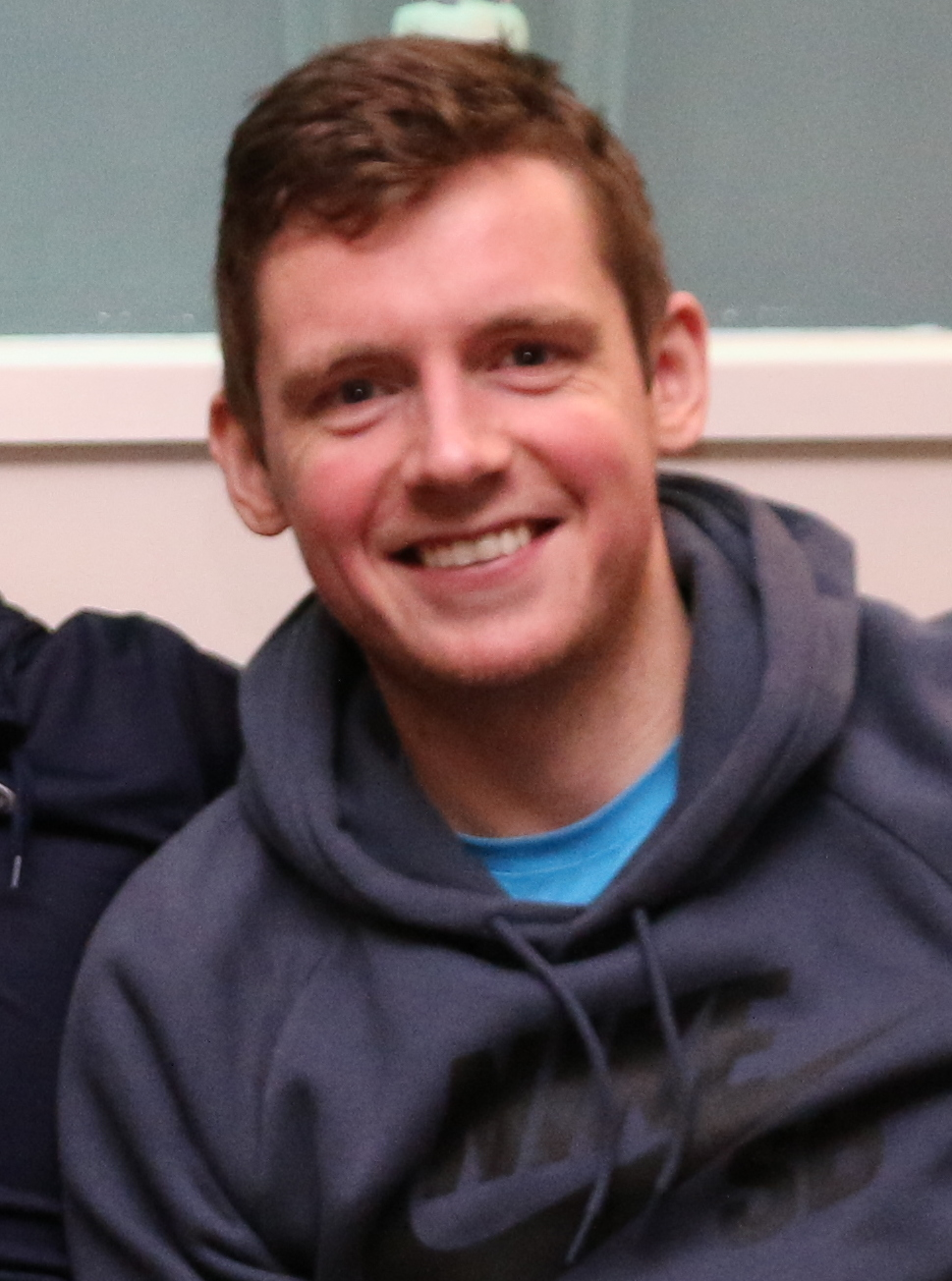
- Greg Lobban (2020)

Personal information
- Nationality: British (Scottish)
- Born: 12 August 1992 (age 33) Inverness, Scotland
- Height: 1.84 m (6 ft 0 in)
- Weight: 89 kg (196 lb)

Sport
- Turned pro: 2012
- Coached by: Roger Flynn
- Retired: Active
- Racquet used: Karakal

Men's singles
- Highest ranking: No. 16 (May 2024)
- Current ranking: No. 18 (October 2025)
- Title: 16
Medal record
Men's squash
Representing Scotland
Commonwealth Games
Bronze medal – third place	2022 Birmingham	Doubles
World Doubles Championships
Gold medal – first place	2016 Darwin	Doubles
Silver medal – second place	2017 Manchester	Doubles
Silver medal – second place	2022 Glasgow	Doubles
Bronze medal – third place	2022 Glasgow	Mixed doubles
National Championships
Gold medal – first place	2013, 2022–25	singles

Greg Lobban (born 12 August 1992) is a professional squash player who represented Scotland. He reached a career high ranking of 16 in the world during May 2024. He competed at three Commonwealth Games and is a five-time champion of Scotland.

== Tournament History ==
Lobban joined the Professional Squash Association in 2012 an first came to prominence at the 2012 IMET Open, claiming the title after being seeded eighth for the tournament. Lobban broke the world's top 100 in March 2013 and his fifth PSA World Tour title came at the Steel City Open, beating George Parker in the final.

He represented the Scottish team at the 2014 Commonwealth Games in Glasgow, where he competed in the singles and doubles events reaching the quarter-finals of the men's doubles with Stuart Crawford.

It was in his home-country of Scotland that Lobban lifted his first PSA M10 crown when he beat Joel Hinds in the final in April 2015. He went on to reach the final of the Victorian Open three months later before losing to Ryan Cuskelly and he followed that up with a quarter-final finish at the Kolkata International which enabled him to reach the world's top 40 for the first time. 2016 brought a number of early-round exits for Lobban but he remained in the world's top 40 in the world rankings for the majority of 2016. It was also in 2016 that he won the 2016 World Squash Doubles Championships with Alan Clyne.

Lobban then reached the final of both the Chicago Open and Arnold Homes Tring Open in 2017, losing out narrowly to Campbell Grayson and England's Declan James. Lobban was sidelined for seven months of the season after he suffered a hamstring tear during his final clash with Grayson. However, the Scotsman soon rediscovered his form when he returned to the squash court in May, reaching six finals and claiming three titles – including wins at the Vitesse Stortford Classic, the NZ International Classic and the Invercargill Open.

A second Games appearance ensued, representing the 2018 Scottish team at the 2018 Commonwealth Games in the Gold Coast, Australia, where he competed in the singles and doubles events reaching the semi-finals of the men's doubles with Alan Clyne. He went to his third Commonwealth Games in 2022 in Birmingham. Partnering Rory Stewart they won a bronze medal in the men's doubles.

In 2024, Lobban won his 14th PSA title after securing victory in the Van Lawn Open during the 2024–25 PSA Squash Tour. A 15th PSA title was secured in May 2025 when he won the Irish Open and a 16th title came his way in September 2025 after he secured victory in the Budapest Open during the 2025–26 PSA Squash Tour.

In 2025, Lobban became the national singles champion for the fifth time at the Scottish National Squash Championships.

== PSA World Tour Titles ==
- 1 2012 Imet Open M5, Slovakia
- 2 2013 SRAM Series No.2 M5, Malaysia
- 3 2014 Geneva Open M5, Switzerland
- 4 2014 Securian Open M5, USA
- 5 2014 Steel City Open M5, England
- 6 2015 North of Scotland Open M10, Scotland
- 7 2017 Vitesse Stortford Classic M10, England
- 8 2017 New Zealand International Classic M10, Palmerston North
- 9 2017 ILT-Community Trust NZ Southern Invercargill Open M15, New Zealand
- 10 2019 HKFC International Open
- 11 2019 Cleveland Skating Club Open
- 12 2022 Irish Open
- 13 2023 Open de Montreal
- 14 2024 Van Lawn Open
- 15 2025 Irish Open
- 16 2025 Budapest Open
