= Ryosei Kobayashi =

Japanese squash player (born 1994)

Personal information
- Born: June 28, 1994 (age 32) Yokohama, Japan
- Height: 1.65 m (5 ft 5 in)

Sport
- Country: Japan
- Turned pro: 2010
- Retired: Active
- Racquet used: Head

Men's singles
- Highest ranking: No. 63 (September 2021)
- Updated on September 2021

Ryosei Kobayashi (小林 僚生, Kobayashi Ryōsei; born 28 June 1994 in Kanagawa) is a professional squash player who represents Japan. He reached a career-high world ranking of World No. 63 in September 2021.
