= Tomotaka Endo =

Japanese squash player (born 1995)

Personal information
- Born: January 28, 1995 (age 31) Brisbane, Australia
- Height: 186 cm (6 ft 1 in)
- Weight: 80 kg (176 lb)

Sport
- Country: Japan
- Turned pro: 2010
- Retired: Active
- Racquet used: Tecnifibre

Men's singles
- Highest ranking: No. 80 (September 2020)
- Current ranking: No. 112 (February 2026)
- Title: 4
Medal record
Women's squash
Representing Japan
World Cup
Bronze medal – third place	2025 Chennai	Team

Tomotaka Endo (遠藤共峻, Endō Tomotaka; born 28 January 1995) is a Japanese professional squash player. He reached a career high ranking of 80 in the world during September 2020. and number 1 in Japan. The world ranking was the highest ever for the Japan men's squash history.

== Career ==
Endo won the 2018 Queensland Open, becoming the first Japanese player ever to win a professional PSA Tour tournament.

In 2024, Endo won his 3rd PSA title after securing victory in the Philippine Challenger Classic during the 2024–25 PSA Squash Tour. A fourth title followed during the 2025–26 PSA Squash Tour when he won the Korea Cup.
