= Syed Azlan Amjad =

Pakistani-born Qatari squash player (born 1996)

Personal information
- Born: 15 September 1996 (age 30) Pakistan

Sport
- Country: Qatar
- Retired: Active
- Highest ranking: No. 64 (2020)
- Current ranking: unknown (unknown)
- Updated on February, 2018

Syed Azlan Amjad (born 15 September 1996) is a Pakistani born Qatari professional squash player. As of 2020, he was ranked number 64 in the world.
