= Ryūnosuke Tsukue =

Japanese squash player (born 1997)

Ryunosuke Tsukue
Personal information
- Born: August 13, 1997 (age 29) Kanagawa, Japan
- Height: 175 cm (5 ft 9 in)
- Weight: 62 kg (137 lb)

Sport
- Country: Japan
- Retired: Active

Men's singles
- Highest ranking: No. 47 (April 2025)
- Current ranking: No. 50 (April 2025)
- Title: 11
Medal record
Women's squash
Representing Japan
World Cup
| Bronze medal – third place | 2025 Chennai | Team |

Ryūnosuke Tsukue (机 龍之介, Tsukue Ryūnosuke; born 13 August 1997) is a Japanese professional squash player and No. 1 in Japan. He reached a career high ranking of 47 in the world during April 2025.

== Career ==
Tsukue won the 2018 Japanese Nationals and the 2019 Golden Open.

In April 2025, Tsukue won his 11th PSA title after securing victory in the Yokohama Open during the 2024–25 PSA Squash Tour.
