= Mohd Syafiq Kamal =

Malaysian squash player (born 1996)

Mohammad Syafiq Kamal
Personal information
- Full name: Mohammad Syafiq Bin Mohd Kamal
- Born: 1 August 1996 (age 30) Kota Bahru, Malaysia

Sport
- Country: Malaysia
- Handedness: Left Handed
- Retired: Active
- Racquet used: Tecnifibre
- Highest ranking: No. 84 (February 2018)
- Current ranking: No. 84 (February, 2018)
Medal record
Men's squash
Representing Malaysia
Asian Games
Gold medal – first place	2018 Jakarta-Palembang	Team
Gold medal – first place	2026 Aichi-Nagoya	Team
Silver medal – second place	2022 Hangzhou	Mixed doubles
Bronze medal – third place	2022 Hangzhou	Team
- Updated on February, 2018

Mohammad Syafiq Bin Mohd Kamal (born 1 August 1996 in Kota Bahru), also known as Mohammad Syafiq Kamal or Mohd Syafiq Kamal, is a Malaysian professional squash player. As of February 2018, he was ranked number 84 in the world.
