= Ng Eain Yow =

Malaysian squash player (born 1998)

Personal information
- Born: 26 January 1998 (age 28) Kuala Lumpur, Malaysia
- Height: 1.70 m (5 ft 7 in)
- Weight: 65 kg (143 lb)

Sport
- Country: Malaysia
- Retired: Active
- Highest ranking: No. 10 (April 2025)
- Current ranking: No. 12 (14 July 2025)
- Title: 7
Medal record
Representing Malaysia
Men's squash
Asian Games
Gold medal – first place	2018 Jakarta-Palembang	Team
Gold medal – first place	2022 Hangzhou	Singles
Gold medal – first place	2026 Aichi-Nagoya	Singles
Gold medal – first place	2026 Aichi-Nagoya	Team
Bronze medal – third place	2022 Hangzhou	Team
Asian Championships
Gold medal – first place	2021 Islamabad	Singles

Ng Eain Yow (born 26 January 1998) is a Malaysian professional squash player. He reached a career high ranking of 10 in the world during April 2025.

== Biography ==
Ng was born and bred in Kuala Lumpur, Malaysia to Low Soo Goon and Ng Hong Yuen. Ng was exposed to the sport at the age of five and started training properly two years later.

In 2024, Ng won his 8th PSA title after securing victory in the ACE Malaysia Cup during the 2024–25 PSA Squash Tour.

In Asian Games 2026, He have made history by becoming the first Malaysian squash players along with Sivasangari Subramaniam to qualify for the 2028 Olympics after winning gold medals at the Asian Games in Aichi-Nagoya, Japan.The defending champions won the men's and women's singles finals and earned a ticket to the 2028 Summer Olympics, where squash will make its Olympic debut.
