= Addeen Idrakie =

Malaysian squash player (born 1994)

Personal information
- Born: 5 January 1994 (age 32) Kuala Lumpur, Malaysia

Sport
- Retired: Active
- Highest ranking: No. 61 (October 2023)
- Current ranking: No. 104 (July 2025)
- Title: 9
Medal record
Men's squash
Representing Malaysia
Asian Games
| Bronze medal – third place | 2022 Hangzhou | Team |
Southeast Asian Games
| Gold medal – first place | 2019 Philippines | Singles |
| Gold medal – first place | 2019 Philippines | Team |

Muhammad Addeen Idrakie Bin Bahtiar (born 5 January 1994), known as Addeen Idrakie, is a Malaysian professional squash player. He reached a career high ranking of 61 in the world during October 2023.

== Biography ==
In July 2025, Idrakie won his 8th and 9th PSA titles in quick succession, after securing victory in the Morrinsville Open and Victorian Open respectively, during the 2024–25 PSA Squash Tour.
