= Tayyab Aslam =

Pakistani squash player (born 1996)

Personal information
- Born: 9 August 1996 (age 30) Lahore, Pakistan

Sport
- Country: Pakistan
- Retired: Active

Men's singles
- Highest ranking: No. 41 (January 2021)
- Current ranking: No. 201 (September 2025)
- Title: 13
Medal record
Men's squash
Representing Pakistan
Asian Games
| Bronze medal – third place | 2018 Jakarta | Team |
Asian Championships
| Gold medal – first place | 2016 New Taipei City | Team |
| Silver medal – second place | 2018 Cheongju | Team |
South Asian Games
| Gold medal – first place | 2019 Nepal | Singles |
| Gold medal – first place | 2019 Nepal | Team |

Tayyab Aslam (born 9 August 1996) is a Pakistani professional squash player. He reached a career high ranking of 41 in the world during January 2021.

== Biography ==
Tayyab won the squash team event bronze medal for Pakistan at the 2018 Asian Games.

In August 2025, he won his 13th PSA title after securing victory in the Independence Day Open during the 2025–26 PSA Squash Tour.
