= Ravindu Laksiri =

Sri Lankan squash player

Personal information
- Full name: Ravindu Hashintha Laksiri
- Nickname: Laksiri
- Born: 28 March 1996 (age 30) Colombo
- Height: 181 cm (5 ft 11 in)
- Weight: 72 kg (159 lb)

Sport
- Country: Sri Lanka
- Highest ranking: No. 114 (January 2025)
- Current ranking: No. 114 (January 2025)
Medal record
South Asian Games
Bronze medal – third place	2016 India	Team
Bronze medal – third place	2019 Nepal	Team

Ravindu Laksiri (born 28 March 1996) is a Sri Lankan male professional squash player. He reached a career high ranking of 114 in the world during January 2025.

== Education ==
Laksiri studied at D. S. Senanayake College. He has won the DS Lion award for the best athlete of the year for three consecutive years at the school sports colors ceremony and is the only student to have won the DS Lion award in three times (2013, 2014 & 2015).

== Career ==
Laksiri's highest achievement at the international junior level is 5th place in the 2013 Asian Youth Games.

Laksiri has represented Sri Lanka in several international squash competitions including the 2013 Men's Asian Individual Squash Championships, 2013 Asian Youth Games, 2016 South Asian Games, 2019 South Asian Games, World Squash Doubles Championships, 2018 Asian Games, 2014 Commonwealth Games and in the 2018 Commonwealth Games. He is the only player to have won the National title 10 times in a row. He also currently leads the Sri Lanka National Squash Team.

He is one of only two Sri Lankan squash players apart from Mihiliya Methsarani set to represent Sri Lanka at the 2018 Commonwealth Games and competed in the men's singles event.

In 2019, he finished 10th in the world Doubles Championship.

In October 2024, Laksiri won his 7th PSA title after securing victory in the Bangladesh Open during the 2024–25 PSA Squash Tour.
