= Yip Tsz Fung =

Hong Kong squash player (born 1993)

Yip Tsz-fung
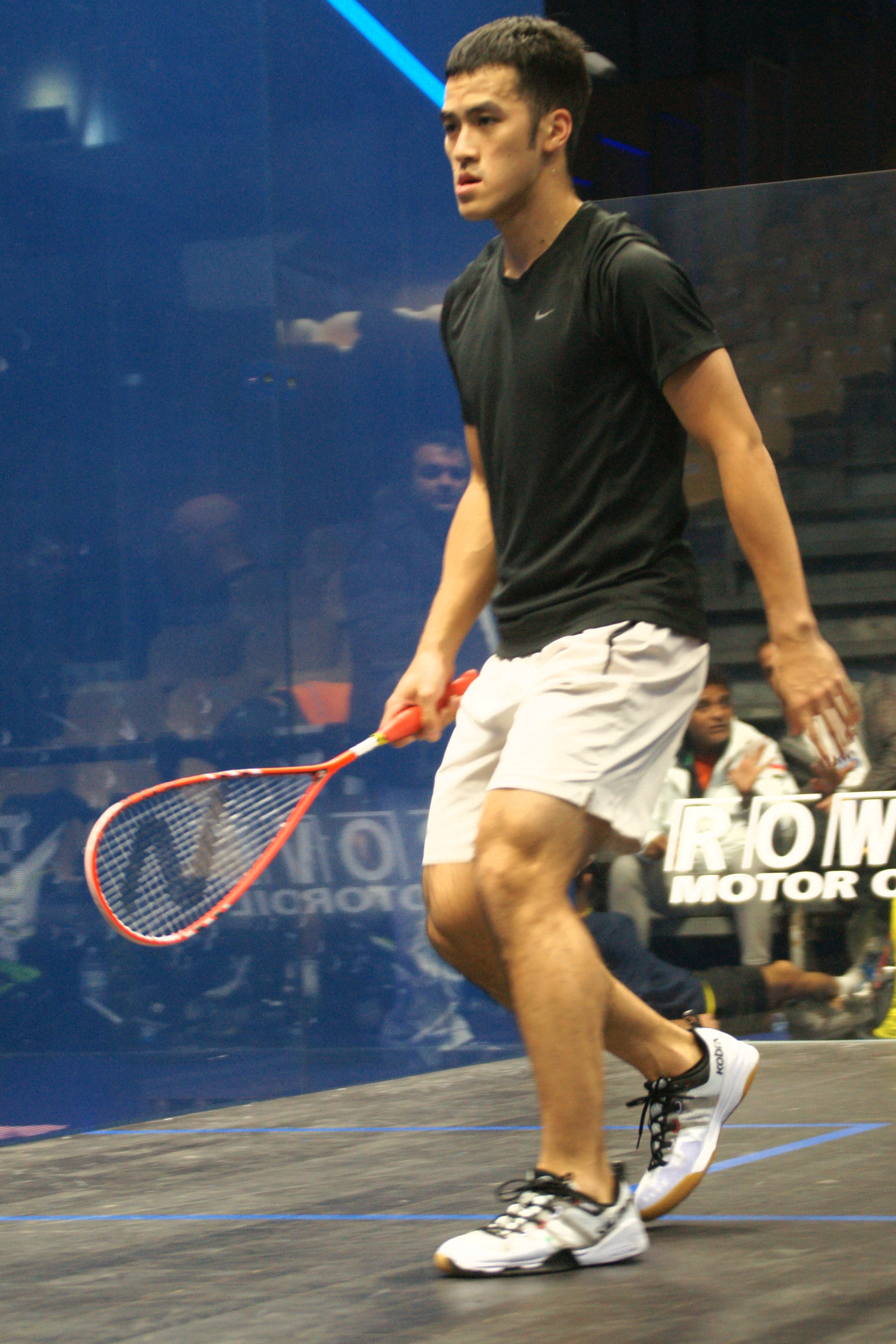
- Yip at the 2017 Men's World Team Squash Championships

Personal information
- Born: 19 September 1993 (age 32) Hong Kong

Sport
- Country: Hong Kong
- Coached by: Abdul Faheem Khan
- Retired: 2022

Men's singles
- Highest ranking: No. 21 (April 2019)
- Current ranking: No. 25 (July 2020)
- Title: 5
- Tour final: 13
Medal record
Men's squash
Representing Hong Kong
World Team Championships
Bronze medal – third place	2017 Marseille	Team
Asian Games
Bronze medal – third place	2014 Incheon	Team
Silver medal – second place	2018 Jakarta	Team
- Updated on July 2020

Yip Tsz-fung (葉梓豐; born 19 September 1993 in Hong Kong) is a professional squash player who represents Hong Kong. He reached a career-high world ranking of World No. 21 in April 2019. He was coach by Abdul Faheem Khan.
