= List of Asian Games medalists in squash =

This is the complete list of Asian Games medalists in squash from 1998 to 2026.

== Events ==
=== Men's singles ===
Games	Gold	Silver	Bronze
1998 Bangkok	Zarak Jahan Khan (PAK)	Amjad Khan (PAK)	Abdul Faheem Khan (HKG)
1998 Bangkok	Zarak Jahan Khan (PAK)	Amjad Khan (PAK)	Kenneth Low (MAS)
2002 Busan	Ong Beng Hee (MAS)	Mansoor Zaman (PAK)	Mohd Azlan Iskandar (MAS)
2002 Busan	Ong Beng Hee (MAS)	Mansoor Zaman (PAK)	Shahid Zaman (PAK)
2006 Doha	Ong Beng Hee (MAS)	Mohd Azlan Iskandar (MAS)	Saurav Ghosal (IND)
2006 Doha	Ong Beng Hee (MAS)	Mohd Azlan Iskandar (MAS)	Mansoor Zaman (PAK)
2010 Guangzhou	Mohd Azlan Iskandar (MAS)	Aamir Atlas Khan (PAK)	Saurav Ghosal (IND)
2010 Guangzhou	Mohd Azlan Iskandar (MAS)	Aamir Atlas Khan (PAK)	Ong Beng Hee (MAS)
2014 Incheon	Abdullah Al-Muzayen (KUW)	Saurav Ghosal (IND)	Max Lee (HKG)
2014 Incheon	Abdullah Al-Muzayen (KUW)	Saurav Ghosal (IND)	Ong Beng Hee (MAS)
2018 Jakarta–Palembang	Leo Au (HKG)	Max Lee (HKG)	Saurav Ghosal (IND)
2018 Jakarta–Palembang	Leo Au (HKG)	Max Lee (HKG)	Mohd Nafiizwan Adnan (MAS)
2022 Hangzhou	Ng Eain Yow (MAS)	Saurav Ghosal (IND)	Henry Leung (HKG)
2022 Hangzhou	Ng Eain Yow (MAS)	Saurav Ghosal (IND)	Abdulla Al-Tamimi (QAT)
2026 Aichi–Nagoya	Ng Eain Yow (MAS)	Abhay Singh (IND)	Muhammad Ashab Irfan (PAK)
2026 Aichi–Nagoya	Ng Eain Yow (MAS)	Abhay Singh (IND)	Noor Zaman (PAK)

=== Men's team ===
Games	Gold	Silver	Bronze
2010 Guangzhou	Pakistan (PAK); Yasir Butt; Aamir Atlas Khan; Danish Atlas Khan; Farhan Mehboob	Malaysia (MAS); Mohd Nafiizwan Adnan; Mohd Azlan Iskandar; Ong Beng Hee; Ivan Yuen	Hong Kong (HKG); Leo Au; Kwong Yu Shun; Dick Lau; Max Lee
2010 Guangzhou	Pakistan (PAK); Yasir Butt; Aamir Atlas Khan; Danish Atlas Khan; Farhan Mehboob	Malaysia (MAS); Mohd Nafiizwan Adnan; Mohd Azlan Iskandar; Ong Beng Hee; Ivan Yuen	India (IND); Saurav Ghosal; Sandeep Jangra; Harinder Pal Sandhu; Siddharth Suchde
2014 Incheon	India (IND); Saurav Ghosal; Kush Kumar; Mahesh Mangaonkar; Harinder Pal Sandhu	Malaysia (MAS); Mohd Nafiizwan Adnan; Mohd Azlan Iskandar; Ong Beng Hee; Ivan Yuen	Hong Kong (HKG); Leo Au; Cheuk Yan Tang; Max Lee; Yip Tsz Fung
2014 Incheon	India (IND); Saurav Ghosal; Kush Kumar; Mahesh Mangaonkar; Harinder Pal Sandhu	Malaysia (MAS); Mohd Nafiizwan Adnan; Mohd Azlan Iskandar; Ong Beng Hee; Ivan Yuen	Kuwait (KUW); Abdullah Al-Muzayen; Ali Al-Ramezi; Ammar Al-Tamimi; Falah Fayez
2018 Jakarta–Palembang	Malaysia (MAS); Mohd Nafiizwan Adnan; Mohd Syafiq Kamal; Ng Eain Yow; Ivan Yuen	Hong Kong (HKG); Leo Au; Max Lee; Henry Leung; Yip Tsz Fung	India (IND); Saurav Ghosal; Mahesh Mangaonkar; Harinder Pal Sandhu; Ramit Tandon
2018 Jakarta–Palembang	Malaysia (MAS); Mohd Nafiizwan Adnan; Mohd Syafiq Kamal; Ng Eain Yow; Ivan Yuen	Hong Kong (HKG); Leo Au; Max Lee; Henry Leung; Yip Tsz Fung	Pakistan (PAK); Israr Ahmed; Tayyab Aslam; Amaad Fareed; Asim Khan
2022 Hangzhou	India (IND); Saurav Ghosal; Mahesh Mangaonkar; Harinder Pal Sandhu; Abhay Singh	Pakistan (PAK); Nasir Iqbal; Asim Khan; Farhan Zaman; Noor Zaman	Hong Kong (HKG); Lau Tsz Kwan; Henry Leung; Tang Ming Hong; Wong Chi Him
2022 Hangzhou	India (IND); Saurav Ghosal; Mahesh Mangaonkar; Harinder Pal Sandhu; Abhay Singh	Pakistan (PAK); Nasir Iqbal; Asim Khan; Farhan Zaman; Noor Zaman	Malaysia (MAS); Addeen Idrakie; Mohd Syafiq Kamal; Ng Eain Yow; Ivan Yuen
2026 Aichi–Nagoya	Malaysia (MAS); Ameeshenraj Chandaran; Sanjay Jeeva; Mohd Syafiq Kamal; Ng Eain Yow	Pakistan (PAK); Nasir Iqbal; Muhammad Ashab Irfan; Asim Khan; Noor Zaman	Hong Kong (HKG); Matthew Lai; Lau Tsz Kwan; Henry Leung; Tang Ming Hong
2026 Aichi–Nagoya	Malaysia (MAS); Ameeshenraj Chandaran; Sanjay Jeeva; Mohd Syafiq Kamal; Ng Eain Yow	Pakistan (PAK); Nasir Iqbal; Muhammad Ashab Irfan; Asim Khan; Noor Zaman	India (IND); Suraj Chand; Veer Chotrani; Velavan Senthilkumar; Abhay Singh

=== Women's singles ===
Games	Gold	Silver	Bronze
1998 Bangkok	Nicol David (MAS)	Rebecca Chiu (HKG)	Della Lee (SIN)
1998 Bangkok	Nicol David (MAS)	Rebecca Chiu (HKG)	Mah Li Lian (SIN)
2002 Busan	Rebecca Chiu (HKG)	Nicol David (MAS)	Lee Hai-kyung (KOR)
2002 Busan	Rebecca Chiu (HKG)	Nicol David (MAS)	Sharon Wee (MAS)
2006 Doha	Nicol David (MAS)	Rebecca Chiu (HKG)	Christina Mak (HKG)
2006 Doha	Nicol David (MAS)	Rebecca Chiu (HKG)	Sharon Wee (MAS)
2010 Guangzhou	Nicol David (MAS)	Annie Au (HKG)	Joey Chan (HKG)
2010 Guangzhou	Nicol David (MAS)	Annie Au (HKG)	Low Wee Wern (MAS)
2014 Incheon	Nicol David (MAS)	Low Wee Wern (MAS)	Annie Au (HKG)
2014 Incheon	Nicol David (MAS)	Low Wee Wern (MAS)	Dipika Pallikal (IND)
2018 Jakarta–Palembang	Nicol David (MAS)	Sivasangari Subramaniam (MAS)	Joshna Chinappa (IND)
2018 Jakarta–Palembang	Nicol David (MAS)	Sivasangari Subramaniam (MAS)	Dipika Pallikal (IND)
2022 Hangzhou	Sivasangari Subramaniam (MAS)	Chan Sin Yuk (HKG)	Ho Tze Lok (HKG)
2022 Hangzhou	Sivasangari Subramaniam (MAS)	Chan Sin Yuk (HKG)	Satomi Watanabe (JPN)
2026 Aichi–Nagoya	Sivasangari Subramaniam (MAS)	Anahat Singh (IND)	Chan Sin Yuk (HKG)
2026 Aichi–Nagoya	Sivasangari Subramaniam (MAS)	Anahat Singh (IND)	Satomi Watanabe (JPN)

=== Women's team ===
Games	Gold	Silver	Bronze
2010 Guangzhou	Malaysia (MAS); Delia Arnold; Nicol David; Low Wee Wern; Sharon Wee	Hong Kong (HKG); Annie Au; Joey Chan; Rebecca Chiu; Liu Tsz Ling	India (IND); Anaka Alankamony; Joshna Chinappa; Dipika Pallikal; Anwesha Reddy
2010 Guangzhou	Malaysia (MAS); Delia Arnold; Nicol David; Low Wee Wern; Sharon Wee	Hong Kong (HKG); Annie Au; Joey Chan; Rebecca Chiu; Liu Tsz Ling	South Korea (KOR); Kim Ga-hye; Kim Jin-hee; Park Eun-ok; Song Sun-mi
2014 Incheon	Malaysia (MAS); Delia Arnold; Nicol David; Low Wee Wern; Vanessa Raj	India (IND); Anaka Alankamony; Aparajitha Balamurukan; Joshna Chinappa; Dipika Pallikal	Hong Kong (HKG); Annie Au; Joey Chan; Liu Tsz Ling; Tong Tsz Wing
2014 Incheon	Malaysia (MAS); Delia Arnold; Nicol David; Low Wee Wern; Vanessa Raj	India (IND); Anaka Alankamony; Aparajitha Balamurukan; Joshna Chinappa; Dipika Pallikal	South Korea (KOR); Lee Ji-hyun; Park Eun-ok; Song Sun-mi; Yang Yeon-soo
2018 Jakarta–Palembang	Hong Kong (HKG); Annie Au; Joey Chan; Ho Tze Lok; Lee Ka Yi	India (IND); Joshna Chinappa; Tanvi Khanna; Sunayna Kuruvilla; Dipika Pallikal	Japan (JPN); Misaki Kobayashi; Risa Sugimoto; Satomi Watanabe
2018 Jakarta–Palembang	Hong Kong (HKG); Annie Au; Joey Chan; Ho Tze Lok; Lee Ka Yi	India (IND); Joshna Chinappa; Tanvi Khanna; Sunayna Kuruvilla; Dipika Pallikal	Malaysia (MAS); Aifa Azman; Nicol David; Low Wee Wern; Sivasangari Subramaniam
2022 Hangzhou	Malaysia (MAS); Rachel Arnold; Aifa Azman; Aira Azman; Sivasangari Subramaniam	Hong Kong (HKG); Chan Sin Yuk; Ho Tze Lok; Lee Ka Yi; Tong Tsz Wing	India (IND); Joshna Chinappa; Tanvi Khanna; Dipika Pallikal; Anahat Singh
2022 Hangzhou	Malaysia (MAS); Rachel Arnold; Aifa Azman; Aira Azman; Sivasangari Subramaniam	Hong Kong (HKG); Chan Sin Yuk; Ho Tze Lok; Lee Ka Yi; Tong Tsz Wing	South Korea (KOR); Eum Hwa-yeong; Heo Min-gyeong; Lee Ji-hyun; Yang Yeon-soo
2026 Aichi–Nagoya	Malaysia (MAS); Rachel Arnold; Aifa Azman; Aira Azman; Sivasangari Subramaniam	Hong Kong (HKG); Chan Sin Yuk; Ho Tze Lok; Lee Ka Yi; Toby Tse	India (IND); Joshna Chinappa; Tanvi Khanna; Shameena Riaz; Anahat Singh
2026 Aichi–Nagoya	Malaysia (MAS); Rachel Arnold; Aifa Azman; Aira Azman; Sivasangari Subramaniam	Hong Kong (HKG); Chan Sin Yuk; Ho Tze Lok; Lee Ka Yi; Toby Tse	Japan (JPN); Akari Midorikawa; Erisa Sano; Risa Sugimoto; Satomi Watanabe

=== Mixed doubles ===
Games	Gold	Silver	Bronze
2022 Hangzhou	Harinder Pal Sandhu and Dipika Pallikal (IND)	Mohd Syafiq Kamal and Aifa Azman (MAS)	Wong Chi Him and Lee Ka Yi (HKG)
2022 Hangzhou	Harinder Pal Sandhu and Dipika Pallikal (IND)	Mohd Syafiq Kamal and Aifa Azman (MAS)	Abhay Singh and Anahat Singh (IND)
2026 Aichi–Nagoya	Tang Ming Hong and Lee Ka Yi (HKG)	Matthew Lai and Toby Tse (HKG)	Velavan Senthilkumar and Joshna Chinappa (IND)
2026 Aichi–Nagoya	Tang Ming Hong and Lee Ka Yi (HKG)	Matthew Lai and Toby Tse (HKG)	Ameeshenraj Chandaran and Rachel Arnold (MAS)
