= Asian Junior Individual Squash Championships =

Asian individual squash competition

Details
- Event name: Asian Junior Individual Squash Championships
- Website asiansquash.org

The Asian Junior Individual Squash Championships are the event which serves as the individual Asian junior championship for squash players organised by the Asian Squash Federation.

== Editions ==
Edition	Year	Host	Dates	Events
1	1983	Singapore, Singapore	Feb 1-6	2
2	1985	Hong Kong, Hong Kong	Jan 5–15	2
3	1987	Pakistan, Karachi	Jan 15–25	2
4	1989	Bahrain, Manama	Feb 1-10	1
5	1991	Sri Lanka, Colombo	Jan 17–26	2
6	1993	Singapore, Singapore	Jan 27 – Feb 4	2
7	1995	Hong Kong, Hong Kong	Jan 19–27	2
8	1997	India, Chennai	Feb 14-23	2
9	1999	Malaysia, Kuala Lumpur	Jan 24–31	2
10	2001	India, Chennai	Feb 17-24	2
11	2003	Pakistan, Islamabad	Feb 1-8	2
12	2005	India, Chennai	Jan 20–28	2
13	2006	Singapore, Singapore	Jan 8–14	4
14	2007	Hong Kong, Hong Kong	Feb 1-6	2
15	2008	South Korea, Busan	Jun 24–29	4
16	2009	India, Chennai	Feb 16-23	2
17	2010	Sri Lanka, Colombo	July 7–10	4
18	2011	Jordan, Amman	Jun 21-25	8
19	2012	Iran, Kish Island	Jun 19–23	8
20	2013	Jordan, Amman	Jun 25–29	8
21	2014	Iran, Kish Island	Jun 22–26	8
22	2015	Iran, Teheran	Aug 23–27	8
23	2016	Malaysia, Kuala Lumpur	Sep 20–24	8
24	2017	Jordan, Amman	Aug 15–19	8
25	2018	India, Chennai	Sep 26–29	8
26	2019	Macau, Macau	Jun 26–30	8
27	2020	Cancelled due to the Covid-19 pandemic		
28	2021	Cancelled due to the Covid-19 pandemic		
29	2022	Thailand, Na Chom Thian	Jun 15–19	8
30	2023	China, Dalian	Aug 16–20	8
31	2024	Pakistan, Islamabad	June 25–29	8
32	2025	South Korea, Gimcheon	July 1–5	8
33	2026	China,Sichuan	May 20-24	8

== Medal table ==
Rank	Nation	Gold	Silver	Bronze	Total
1	Malaysia (MAS)	56	35	0	91
2	Pakistan (PAK)	34	24	0	58
3	Hong Kong (HKG)	17	28	0	45
4	India (IND)	17	22	0	39
5	Jordan (JOR)	4	6	0	10
6	Singapore (SIN)	3	3	0	6
7	Japan (JPN)	1	1	0	2
8	Kuwait (KUW)	0	1	0	1
8	Philippines (PHI)	0	1	0	1
Totals (9 entries)		132	121	0	253

== Winners and results ==
=== Boys Under 13 ===
Year	Venue	Champion	Runner-up
(Jordan) 2011	Amman	(Malaysia) Farez Izwan Mukhtar	(Jordan) Mohammad Al-Saraj
(Iran) 2012	Kish Island	(Pakistan) Hammas Ahmed Tarrar	(India) Dev Vazirani
(Jordan) 2013	Amman	(Malaysia) Hafiz Zhafri	(India) Veer Chotrani
(Iran) 2014	Kish Island	(India) Veer Chotrani	(India) Yash Fadte
(Iran) 2015	Teheran	(Malaysia) Amir Amirul	(India) Navaneeth Prabhu
(Malaysia) 2016	Kuala Lumpur	(Pakistan) Assad Ullah	(Malaysia) Andrik Lim
(Jordan) 2017	Amman	(Malaysia) Joachim Chuah	(India) Yuvraj Wadhwani
(India) 2018	Chennai	(India) Yuvraj Wadhwani	(Pakistan) Anas Ali Shah
(Macau) 2019	Macau	(Malaysia) Wong Lee Hong	(Philippines) Christopher Buraga
(Thailand) 2022	Na Chom Thian	(Malaysia) Sim Yeak Wei	(Malaysia) Muhammad Raziq Putra
(China) 2023	Dalian	(Pakistan) Nauman Khan	(Pakistan) Ahmad Rayyan Khallil
(Pakistan) 2024	Islamabad	(Pakistan) Sohail Adnan	(Pakistan) Huzaifa Shahid
(South Korea) 2025	Gimcheon	(Pakistan) Sohail Adnan	(India) Ayaan Dhanuka
(China) 2026	Sichuan	(Hong Kong) Leung Ngo San	(India) Amarya Bajaj

=== Boys Under 15 ===
Year	Venue	Champion	Runner-up
(Singapore) 2006	Singapore	(Pakistan) Danish Atlas Khan	(Pakistan) Sheikh Salqib
(South Korea) 2008	Busan	(Pakistan) Nasir Iqbal	(India) Mahesh Mangaonkar
(Sri Lanka) 2010	Colombo	(Pakistan) Bilal Zakir	(Pakistan) Ammad Farid
(Jordan) 2011	Amman	(Malaysia) Mohd Syafiq Kamal	(Malaysia) Ng Eain Yow
(Iran) 2012	Kish Island	(Malaysia) Ng Eain Yow	(Jordan) Mohammad Al-Saraj
(Jordan) 2013	Amman	(Malaysia) Farez Izwan Mukhtar	(Jordan) Mohammad Al-Saraj
(Iran) 2014	Kish Island	(Jordan) Ibrahim Abulaban	(Malaysia) Eugene Heng
(Iran) 2015	Teheran	(Malaysia) Siow Yee Xian	(Malaysia) Hafiz Zhafri
(Malaysia) 2016	Kuala Lumpur	(Malaysia) Daniel Nurhaqiem Sharul	(Malaysia) Amir Amirul
(Jordan) 2017	Amman	(Malaysia) Amir Amirul	(India) Neel Joshi
(India) 2018	Chennai	(Pakistan) Muhammad Hamza Khan	(India) Arnaav Sareen
(Macau) 2019	Macau	(Pakistan) Muhammad Hamza Khan	(Malaysia) Joachim Chuah
(Thailand) 2022	Na Chom Thian	(Malaysia) Nickhileswar Moganasundharam	(Malaysia) Aqil Mirza Naim
(China) 2023	Dalian	(Malaysia) Jayden Oon	(Japan) Shunsaku Kariyazono
(Pakistan) 2024	Islamabad	(India) Shiven Agarwal	(Malaysia) Muhammad Raziq Putra Mohd Fakhrur Razi
(South Korea) 2025	Gimcheon	(Pakistan) Nauman Khan	(Pakistan) Ahmad Rayyan Khalil
(China) 2026	Sichuan	(Pakistan) Ahmad Rayyan Khalil	(Malaysia) Vidhurran Ruthiran

=== Boys Under 17 ===
Year	Venue	Champion	Runner-up
(Jordan) 2011	Amman	(Jordan) Ahmad Al-Saraj	(Pakistan) Tayyab Aslam
(Iran) 2012	Kish Island	(India) Kush Kumar	(Malaysia) Gurshan Singh
(Jordan) 2013	Amman	(Malaysia) Ng Eain Yow	(Malaysia) Mohd Syafiq Kamal
(Iran) 2014	Kish Island	(Malaysia) Ng Eain Yow	(Jordan) Mohammad Al-Saraj
(Iran) 2015	Teheran	(Jordan) Mohammad Al-Saraj	(Hong Kong) Chan Wui Ki
(Malaysia) 2016	Kuala Lumpur	(Pakistan) Abbas Zeb	(India) Tushar Shahani
(Jordan) 2017	Amman	(Malaysia) Siow Yee Xian	(India) Tushar Shahani
(India) 2018	Chennai	(Pakistan) Haris Qasim	(Malaysia) Amir Amirul
(Macau) 2019	Macau	(Malaysia) Nathan Kueh Tze Bing	(India) Neel Joshi
(Thailand) 2022	Na Chom Thian	(South Korea) Na Joo-young	(Malaysia) Low Wa Sern
(China) 2023	Dalian	(Malaysia) Low Wa Sern	(South Korea) Jooyoung Na
(Pakistan) 2024	Islamabad	(Malaysia) Nikhileswar Moganasundharam	(Pakistan) Abdullah Nawaz
(South Korea) 2025	Gimcheon	(India) Aryaveer Dewan	(Malaysia) Nickhileswar Moganasundharam
(China) 2026	Sichuan	(Pakistan) Nauman Khan	(India) Shiven Agarwal

=== Boys Under 19 ===
Year	Venue	Champion	Runner-up
(Singapore) 1983	Singapore	(Pakistan) Umar Hayat	(Pakistan) Ahmed Gul
(Hong Kong) 1985	Hong Kong	(Pakistan) Jansher Khan	(Pakistan) Mohd Hanif
(Pakistan) 1987	Karachi	(Pakistan) Jansher Khan	(Pakistan) Farhan Samiullah
(Bahrain) 1989	Manama	(Pakistan) Abdul Rasheed	(Malaysia) Chris Chan
(Sri Lanka) 1991	Colombo	(Pakistan) Abdul Rasheed	(Pakistan) Zubair Jahan Khan
(Singapore) 1993	Singapore	(Hong Kong) Jackie Lee	(Pakistan) Kumail Mahmood
(Hong Kong) 1995	Hong Kong	(Pakistan) Amjad Khan	(Hong Kong) Jackie Lee
(India) 1997	Chennai	(Pakistan) Mansoor Zaman	(Pakistan) Kashif Sujaha
(Malaysia) 1999	Kuala Lumpur	(Pakistan) Mansoor Zaman	(Malaysia) Ong Beng Hee
(India) 2001	Chennai	(Malaysia) Azlan Iskandar	(Pakistan) Shahid Zaman
(Pakistan) 2003	Islamabad	(Pakistan) Farhan Mehboob	(Pakistan) Yasir Butt
(India) 2005	Chennai	(Pakistan) Aamir Atlas Khan	(India) Saurav Ghosal
(Singapore) 2006	Singapore	(Hong Kong) Max Lee	(Hong Kong) Leo Au
(Hong Kong) 2007	Hong Kong	(Pakistan) Farhan Mehboob	(Kuwait) Abdullah Al-Muzayen
(South Korea) 2008	Busan	(Hong Kong) Leo Au	(Malaysia) Ivan Yuen
(India) 2009	Chennai	(Malaysia) Ivan Yuen	(Hong Kong) Leo Au
(Sri Lanka) 2010	Colombo	(India) Ravi Dixit	(Pakistan) Waqar Mehboob
(Jordan) 2011	Amman	(Pakistan) Danish Atlas Khan	(India) Ramit Tandon
(Iran) 2012	Kish Island	(Pakistan) Danish Atlas Khan	(Pakistan) Syed Ali Bokhari
(Jordan) 2013	Amman	(Pakistan) Syed Ali Bokhari	(Jordan) Ahmad Al-Saraj
(Iran) 2014	Kish Island	(Pakistan) Tayyab Aslam	(India) Kush Kumar
(Iran) 2015	Teheran	(Pakistan) Israr Ahmed	(Malaysia) Ng Eain Yow
(Malaysia) 2016	Kuala Lumpur	(India) Velavan Senthilkumar	(Jordan) Mohammad Al-Saraj
(Jordan) 2017	Amman	(Jordan) Mohammad Al-Saraj	(Pakistan) Mansoor Zaman
(India) 2018	Chennai	(Pakistan) Abbas Zeb	(Hong Kong) Chung Yat Long
(Macau) 2019	Macau	(India) Veer Chotrani	(India) Yash Fadte
(Thailand) 2022	Na Chom Thian	(Pakistan) Noor Zaman	(Malaysia) Joachim Chuah
(China) 2023	Dalian	(Malaysia) Joachim Chuah	(Malaysia) Harith Danial
(Pakistan) 2024	Islamabad	(Pakistan) Hamza Khan	(Malaysia) Harith Danial
(South Korea) 2025	Gimcheon	(Malaysia) Low Wa Sern	(South Korea) Jooyoung Na
(China) 2026	Sichuan	(India) Aryaveer Dewan	(South Korea) Jonghyeok Lee

=== Girls Under 13 ===
Year	Venue	Champion	Runner-up
(Jordan) 2011	Amman	(Malaysia) Sivasangari Subramaniam	(Malaysia) Andrea Lee
(Iran) 2012	Kish Island	(Malaysia) Nur Aliah Anis	(Hong Kong) Cheng Nga Ching
(Jordan) 2013	Amman	(Malaysia) Ooi Kah Yan	(Hong Kong) Liu Hiu Lam
(Iran) 2014	Kish Island	(Malaysia) Aifa Azman	(Hong Kong) Lau Tin Yan
(Iran) 2015	Teheran	(Malaysia) Kiroshanna Manoharan	(Malaysia) Heng Wai Wong
(Malaysia) 2016	Kuala Lumpur	(Malaysia) Aira Azman	(Hong Kong) Kirstie Wong
(Jordan) 2017	Amman	(Malaysia) Aira Azman	(Hong Kong) Toby Tse
(India) 2018	Chennai	(Hong Kong) Leung Ka Huen	(Hong Kong) Lee Sze Lok
(Macau) 2019	Macau	(Malaysia) Anrie Goh	(Hong Kong) Ena Kwong
(Thailand) 2022	Na Chom Thian	(Malaysia) Harleein Tan	(Hong Kong) Chloe Lo
(China) 2023	Dalian	(Malaysia) Jinoreeka Nigh Manivannan	(Malaysia) Niea Chew
(Pakistan) 2024	Islamabad	(India) Aadya Budhia	(India) Goushika M
(South Korea) 2025	Gimcheon	(China) Yin Ziyuan	(Pakistan) Mahnoor Ali
(China) 2026	Sichuan	(Singapore) Kareena Sashikumar	(Japan) Rio Yoshino

=== Girls Under 15 ===
Year	Venue	Champion	Runner-up
(Singapore) 2006	Singapore	(India) Dipika Pallikal	(Hong Kong) Tong Tsz Wing
(South Korea) 2008	Busan	(India) Anaka Alankamony	(Hong Kong) Ho Ka Po
(Sri Lanka) 2010	Colombo	(Hong Kong) Pansy Chan	(Malaysia) Vanessa Raj
(Jordan) 2011	Amman	(Hong Kong) Choi Uen Shan	(Malaysia) Jadeleen Lee
(Iran) 2012	Kish Island	(Malaysia) Sivasangari Subramaniam	(Malaysia) Zoe Foo
(Jordan) 2013	Amman	(Malaysia) Andrea Lee	(Malaysia) Zoe Foo
(Iran) 2014	Kish Island	(Hong Kong) Lui Hiu Lam	(Malaysia) Nur Aliah Anis
(Iran) 2015	Teheran	(Malaysia) Aifa Azman	(Hong Kong) Lui Hiu Lam
(Malaysia) 2016	Kuala Lumpur	(Malaysia) Aifa Azman	(Hong Kong) Chan Sin Yuk
(Jordan) 2017	Amman	(Malaysia) Jessica Keng	(Malaysia) Kiroshanna Manoharan
(India) 2018	Chennai	(Malaysia) Aira Azman	(Malaysia) Yee Xin Ying
(Macau) 2019	Macau	(Malaysia) Aira Azman	(India) Yuvna Gupta
(Thailand) 2022	Na Chom Thian	(India) Anahat Singh	(Hong Kong) Ena Kwong
(China) 2023	Dalian	(Hong Kong) Helen Tang	(Malaysia) Harleein Tan
(South Korea) 2025	Gimcheon	(Malaysia) Jinoreeka Ning Manivanan	(India) Saanvi Kalanki
(China) 2026	Sichuan	(China) Yin Ziyuan	(Pakistan) Mahnoor Ali

=== Girls Under 17 ===
Year	Venue	Champion	Runner-up
(Jordan) 2011	Amman	(Hong Kong) Ho Ka Po	(India) Saumya Karki
(Iran) 2012	Kish Island	(Hong Kong) Ho Tze-Lok	(Hong Kong) Choi Eun Shan
(Jordan) 2013	Amman	(Hong Kong) Choi Uen Shan	(Malaysia) Nazihah Hanis
(Iran) 2014	Kish Island	(Malaysia) Andrea Lee	(Malaysia) Zoe Foo
(Iran) 2015	Teheran	(Malaysia) Sivasangari Subramaniam	(Malaysia) Zoe Foo
(Malaysia) 2016	Kuala Lumpur	(Hong Kong) Lui Hui Lam	(Malaysia) Wen Li Lai
(Jordan) 2017	Amman	(Hong Kong) Lui Hiu Lam	(Hong Kong) Chan Sin Yuk
(India) 2018	Chennai	(Hong Kong) Chan Sin Yuk	(Malaysia) Jessica Keng
(Macau) 2019	Macau	(Hong Kong) Chan Sin Yuk	(Malaysia) Yee Xin Ying
(Thailand) 2022	Na Chom Thian	(Japan) Akari Midorikawa	(Malaysia) Goh Zhi Xuan
(China) 2023	Dalian	(India) Anahat Singh	(Hong Kong) Kwong Ena
(South Korea) 2025	Gimcheon	(Hong Kong) Helen Tang	(Malaysia) Harleein Tan
(China) 2026	Sichuan	(Malaysia) Harleein Tan	(India) Anika Dubey

=== Girls Under 19 ===
Year	Venue	Champion	Runner-up
(Singapore) 1983	Singapore	(Singapore) Lim Siok Hui	(Hong Kong) Dawn Olsen
(Hong Kong) 1985	Hong Kong	(Singapore) Lina Ong	(Singapore) Rhonda Koh
(Pakistan) 1987	Karachi	(Singapore) Mah Li Lian	(Singapore) Lina Ong
(Bahrain) 1989	Manama	not held	
(Sri Lanka) 1991	Colombo	(Malaysia) Sandra Wu	(Malaysia) Choong Wai Li
(Singapore) 1993	Singapore	(Malaysia) Sandra Wu	(Singapore) Millie Moy
(Hong Kong) 1995	Hong Kong	(Malaysia) Sandra Wu	(Hong Kong) Rebecca Chiu
(India) 1997	Chennai	(Hong Kong) Rebecca Chiu	(Malaysia) Leong Syu Lynn
(Malaysia) 1999	Kuala Lumpur	(Malaysia) Nicol David	(Malaysia) Cheryl David
(India) 2001	Chennai	(Malaysia) Nicol David	(Malaysia) Tricia Chuah
(Pakistan) 2003	Islamabad	(India) Joshna Chinappa	(India) Vaidehi Reddy
(India) 2005	Chennai	(India) Joshna Chinappa	(Hong Kong) Annie Au
(Singapore) 2006	Singapore	(Malaysia) Low Wee Wern	(Hong Kong) Leung Shin Nga
(Hong Kong) 2007	Hong Kong	(Hong Kong) Annie Au	(Hong Kong) Joey Chan
(South Korea) 2008	Busan	(Malaysia) Low Wee Wern	(India) Dipika Pallikal
(India) 2009	Chennai	(Malaysia) Low Wee Wern	(India) Dipika Pallikal
(Sri Lanka) 2010	Colombo	(India) Dipika Pallikal	(Malaysia) Low Wee Nee
(Jordan) 2011	Amman	(India) Anaka Alankamony	(Hong Kong) Tong Tsz Wing
(Iran) 2012	Kish Island	(India) Anaka Alankamony	(Hong Kong) Ho Ka Po
(Jordan) 2013	Amman	(Hong Kong) Ho Ka Po	(India) Anaka Alankamony
(Iran) 2014	Kish Island	(Malaysia) Vanessa Raj	(Hong Kong) Ho Tze-Lok
(Iran) 2015	Teheran	(Malaysia) Andrea Lee	(Hong Kong) Choi Uen Shan
(Malaysia) 2016	Kuala Lumpur	(Malaysia) Sivasangari Subramaniam	(Japan) Satomi Watanabe
(Jordan) 2017	Amman	(Japan) Satomi Watanabe	(Hong Kong) Ho Ka Wing
(India) 2018	Chennai	(Malaysia) Chan Yiwen	(Malaysia) Wen Li Lai
(Macau) 2019	Macau	(Malaysia) Chan Yiwen	(Malaysia) Aifa Azman
(Thailand) 2022	Na Chom Thian	(Malaysia) Aira Azman	(Malaysia) Kirstie Wong
(China) 2023	Dalian	(Malaysia) Aira Azman	(Malaysia) Sehveetrraa Kumar
(South Korea) 2025	Gimcheon	(India) Anahat Singh	(Hong Kong) Cheung Tsz Ching
(China) 2026	Sichuan	(Hong Kong) Helen Tang	(Malaysia) Whitney Isabelle Wilson

== See also ==
- Squash
- Asian Squash Federation
- Asian Junior Team Squash Championships
- Asian Individual Squash Championships
- Asian Team Squash Championships
- World Junior Squash Championships
