= Squash at the 2014 Asian Games – Men's team =

Men's team at the 2014 Asian Games
- Venue: Yeorumul Squash Courts
- Dates: 23–27 September 2014
- Competitors: 39 from 10 nations

Medalists
gold medal	India; Saurav Ghosal, Kush Kumar, Mahesh Mangaonkar, Harinder Pal Sandhu
silver medal	Malaysia; Mohd Nafiizwan Adnan, Mohd Azlan Iskandar, Ong Beng Hee, Ivan Yuen
bronze medal	Kuwait; Abdullah Al-Muzayen, Ali Al-Ramezi, Ammar Al-Tamimi, Falah Fayez
bronze medal	Hong Kong; Leo Au, Cheuk Yan Tang, Max Lee, Yip Tsz Fung

The men's team Squash event was part of the squash programme and took place between September 23 and 27, at the Yeorumul Squash Courts.

== Schedule ==
All times are Korea Standard Time (UTC+09:00)

Date	Time	Event
Tuesday, 23 September 2014	18:00	Group play stage
Wednesday, 24 September 2014	10:00	Group play stage
Thursday, 25 September 2014	10:00	Group play stage
Friday, 26 September 2014	16:00	Semifinals
Saturday, 27 September 2014	16:30	Gold medal match

== Results ==
=== Group play stage ===
==== Pool A ====
Pos	Team	Pld	W	L	MF	MA	Pts	Qualification
1	Kuwait	4	4	0	9	3	4	Semifinals
2	Hong Kong	4	3	1	8	4	3	Semifinals
3	Pakistan	4	2	2	8	4	2	
4	South Korea	4	1	3	3	9	1	
5	Qatar	4	0	4	2	10	0	

Source: ASF

23 September	Pakistan	3–0	Qatar

Danish Atlas Khan	3–0	Abdulwahab Al-Ishaq	11–3, 11–2, 11–0
Nasir Iqbal	3–0	Abdulla Al-Tamimi	11–3, 11–3, 11–7
Farhan Zaman	3–0	Sadam Mehawesh	11–8, 11–2, 11–8

23 September	Kuwait	2–1	South Korea

Falah Fayez	2–3	Yoo Jae-jin	9–11, 11–4, 11–6, 5–11, 10–12
Ammar Al-Tamimi	3–2	Lee Seung-joon	5–11, 8–11, 11–2, 11–4, 11–5
Ali Al-Ramezi	3–1	Lee Se-hyun	7–11, 11–9, 11–8, 11–5

24 September	Pakistan	3–0	South Korea

Farhan Zaman	3–1	Lee Seung-joon	11–5, 11–7, 9–11, 11–8
Danish Atlas Khan	3–1	Hwang Joong-won	10–12, 11–6, 11–8, 15–13
Farhan Mehboob	3–0	Yoo Jae-jin	11–1, 13–11, 11–5

24 September	Hong Kong	2–1	Qatar

Max Lee	2–3	Abdulla Al-Tamimi	11–8, 11–7, 11–13, 6–11, 6–11
Leo Au	3–0	Sadam Mehawesh	11–2, 11–4, 11–3
Yip Tsz Fung	3–0	Abdulrahman Al-Malki	11–5, 11–2, 11–2

24 September	Pakistan	1–2	Hong Kong

Nasir Iqbal	2–3	Max Lee	2–11, 11–8, 12–10, 10–12, 7–11
Farhan Zaman	2–3	Leo Au	9–11, 9–11, 11–9, 11–4, 7–11
Farhan Mehboob	3–0	Cheuk Yan Tang	11–5, 11–4, 11–5

24 September	Kuwait	3–0	Qatar

Ammar Al-Tamimi	3–1	Abdulla Al-Tamimi	11–8, 10–12, 11–3, 15–13
Ali Al-Ramezi	3–0	Sadam Mehawesh	11–4, 11–3, 11–4
Falah Fayez	3–0	Abdulwahab Al-Ishaq	11–3, 11–1, 11–1

25 September	Pakistan	1–2	Kuwait

Farhan Zaman	3–1	Ammar Al-Tamimi	11–7, 11–7, 8–11, 11–4
Danish Atlas Khan	1–3	Ali Al-Ramezi	11–8, 6–11, 8–11, 5–11
Nasir Iqbal	1–3	Abdullah Al-Muzayen	9–11, 11–9, 3–11, 9–11

25 September	Hong Kong	3–0	South Korea

Leo Au	3–0	Hwang Joong-won	11–3, 11–7, 11–8
Yip Tsz Fung	3–0	Yoo Jae-jin	11–5, 11–1, 11–8
Max Lee	3–0	Lee Se-hyun	11–6, 11–2, 11–2

25 September	Kuwait	2–1	Hong Kong

Ali Al-Ramezi	3–1	Yip Tsz Fung	11–5, 7–11, 11–4, 11–7
Falah Fayez	0–3	Cheuk Yan Tang	8–11, 4–11, 5–11
Ammar Al-Tamimi	3–0	Leo Au	11–7, 11–5, 11–7

25 September	South Korea	2–1	Qatar

Lee Se-hyun	3–0	Sadam Mehawesh	11–3, 11–6, 11–5
Hwang Joong-won	3–0	Abdulwahab Al-Ishaq	11–3, 11–2, 11–5
Lee Seung-joon	1–3	Abdulla Al-Tamimi	7–11, 8–11, 11–5, 7–11

==== Pool B ====
Pos	Team	Pld	W	L	MF	MA	Pts	Qualification
1	Malaysia	4	4	0	10	2	4	Semifinals
2	India	4	3	1	9	3	3	Semifinals
3	Jordan	4	2	2	8	4	2	
4	Japan	4	1	3	2	10	1	
5	China	4	0	4	1	11	0	

Source: ASF

23 September	Malaysia	3–0	China

Mohd Azlan Iskandar	3–0	Liang Jun	11–1, 11–2, 11–1
Mohd Nafiizwan Adnan	3–1	Wang Junjie	5–11, 11–8, 11–1, 11–4
Ivan Yuen	3–0	Shen Jiaqi	11–6, 11–8, 11–7

23 September	India	2–1	Jordan

Kush Kumar	3–0	Saif Al-Braikat	11–6, 11–7, 11–9
Mahesh Mangaonkar	1–3	Ahmad Al-Saraj	9–11, 9–11, 12–10, 8–11
Harinder Pal Sandhu	3–1	Mohammad Al-Saraj	11–8, 11–7, 8–11, 11–5

24 September	Malaysia	2–1	Jordan

Ong Beng Hee	3–0	Ahmad Al-Saraj	11–9, 11–5, 11–9
Ivan Yuen	0–3	Mohammad Al-Saraj	11–13, 10–12, 8–11
Mohd Azlan Iskandar	3–0	Ibrahim Abulaban	11–3, 11–4, 11–1

24 September	Japan	2–1	China

Yuta Fukui	0–3	Wang Junjie	8–11, 3–11, 10–12
Shinnosuke Tsukue	3–1	Shen Jiaqi	5–11, 11–7, 11–6, 11–6
Takanori Shimizu	3–0	Yang Tianxia	11–1, 11–3, 11–4

24 September	Malaysia	3–0	Japan

Ong Beng Hee	3–0	Yuta Fukui	11–8, 11–8, 11–7
Mohd Nafiizwan Adnan	3–0	Shinnosuke Tsukue	11–7, 13–11, 11–6
Ivan Yuen	3–0	Takanori Shimizu	11–6, 11–8, 11–4

24 September	India	3–0	China

Mahesh Mangaonkar	3–1	Wang Junjie	11–2, 11–7, 9–11, 11–2
Harinder Pal Sandhu	3–0	Shen Jiaqi	11–4, 11–9, 11–5
Kush Kumar	3–0	Yang Tianxia	11–7, 11–1, 11–1

25 September	India	3–0	Japan

Mahesh Mangaonkar	3–0	Shinnosuke Tsukue	11–5, 11–4, 11–4
Harinder Pal Sandhu	3–0	Takanori Shimizu	11–3, 11–8, 11–5
Saurav Ghosal	3–0	Yuta Fukui	11–7, 11–6, 11–6

25 September	Jordan	3–0	China

Mohammad Al-Saraj	3–1	Shen Jiaqi	11–6, 8–11, 11–6, 11–8
Saif Al-Braikat	3–0	Yang Tianxia	12–10, 11–4, 11–4
Ahmad Al-Saraj	3–0	Wang Junjie	11–8, 11–8, 11–4

25 September	Malaysia	2–1	India

Mohd Nafiizwan Adnan	3–2	Harinder Pal Sandhu	11–4, 10–12, 11–8, 8–11, 11–4
Mohd Azlan Iskandar	3–1	Kush Kumar	12–10, 11–7, 5–11, 12–10
Ong Beng Hee	0–3	Mahesh Mangaonkar	9–11, 3–11, 1–2, Retired

25 September	Japan	0–3	Jordan

Shinnosuke Tsukue	2–3	Mohammad Al-Saraj	11–8, 11–6, 6–11, 9–11, 7–11
Takanori Shimizu	0–3	Saif Al-Braikat	10–12, 2–11, 9–11
Yuta Fukui	0–3	Ahmad Al-Saraj	9–11, 2–11, 9–11

=== Knockout stage ===
Semifinals			Gold medal match
A1	Kuwait	0
B2	India	2	B2	India	2
A2	Hong Kong	0	B1	Malaysia	0
B1	Malaysia	2

==== Semifinals ====
26 September	Kuwait	0–2	India

Ammar Al-Tamimi	0–3	Harinder Pal Sandhu	4–11, 3–11, 10–12
Abdullah Al-Muzayen	2–3	Saurav Ghosal	8–11, 11–7, 9–11, 11–5, 3–11

26 September	Hong Kong	0–2	Malaysia

Leo Au	1–3	Mohd Nafiizwan Adnan	8–11, 11–9, 8–11, 7–11
Max Lee	1–3	Ong Beng Hee	11–2, 6–11, 11–13, 8–11

==== Gold medal match ====
27 September	India	2–0	Malaysia

Harinder Pal Sandhu	3–1	Mohd Azlan Iskandar	11–8, 11–6, 8–11, 11–4
Saurav Ghosal	3–2	Ong Beng Hee	6–11, 11–7, 11–6, 12–14, 11–9
