= 2013 Men's Asian Individual Squash Championships =

2013 Asian Individual Squash Championships

Details
- Event name: 2013 Asian Individual Squash Championships
- Location: Islamabad, Pakistan
- Website www.squashsite.co.uk/2009/asianindivs2013.htm

The 2013 Men's Asian Individual Squash Championships is the men's edition of the 2013 Asian Individual Squash Championships, which serves as the individual Asian championship for squash players. The event took place in Islamabad in Pakistan from 1 to 5 May 2013. Aamir Atlas Khan won his first Asian Individual Championships title, defeating Abdullah Al Muzayen in the final.

== Seeds ==
1. (Malaysia) Ong Beng Hee (second round)
2. (Hong Kong) Max Lee (quarterfinals)
3. (Kuwait) Abdullah Al Muzayen (final)
4. (Malaysia) Mohd Nafiizwan Adnan (quarterfinals)
5. (Hong Kong) Leo Au (quarterfinals)
6. (Pakistan) Aamir Atlas Khan (champion)
7. (Pakistan) Nasir Iqbal (quarterfinals)
8. (Malaysia) Muhd Asyraf Azan (semifinals)

== Draw and results ==
First round
1	(Malaysia) Ong Beng Hee
(Pakistan) Farhan Mehboob
(Kuwait) Ammar Altamimi	11	11	11
(Iraq) Mohd Ferman Hasan	6	5	8
(Iraq) Hasan Al-Sultani	7	4	4
5	(Hong Kong) Leo Au	11	11	11
7	(Pakistan) Nasir Iqbal	11	11	11
(China) Wang Junjie	8	1	6
(Sri Lanka) Ravindu Laksiri	1	2	4
(Kuwait) Ali Bader Al-Ramzi	11	11	11
(Pakistan) Danish Atlas Khan
3	(Kuwait) Abdullah Al Muzayen
4	(Malaysia) Mohd Nafi. Adnan
(Iran) Navid Malek Sabet	9	10	1
(Pakistan) Farhan Zaman	11	12	11
(Jordan) Ahmad Al Saraj	11	11	2	11
(China) Shen Jiaqi	6	4	11	2
(Iraq) Husham Al-Sady	6	8	9
6	(Pakistan) Aamir Atlas Khan	11	11	11
8	(Malaysia) Muhd Asyraf Azan
(Pakistan) Ali M. Syed Bukhari
(Jordan) Ahmad Al Zabidi	11	11	11
(Sri Lanka) Dilsh. Gonawardane	6	5	2
2	(Hong Kong) Max Lee

Second round
1	(Malaysia) Ong Beng Hee	4	3	11
(Pakistan) Farhan Mehboob	11	11	13
(Kuwait) Ammar Altamimi	11	3	3
5	(Hong Kong) Leo Au	13	11	11
7	(Pakistan) Nasir Iqbal	11	11	11
(Kuwait) Ali Bader Al-Ramzi	7	6	8
(Pakistan) Danish Atlas Khan	4	8	9
3	(Kuwait) Abdullah Al Muzayen	11	11	11
4	(Malaysia) Mohd Nafi. Adnan	11	5	9	11	11
(Pakistan) Farhan Zaman	7	11	11	3	9
(Jordan) Ahmad Al Saraj	6	5	8
6	(Pakistan) Aamir Atlas Khan	11	11	11
8	(Malaysia) Muhd Asyraf Azan	9	5	11	11	11
(Pakistan) Ali M. Syed Bukhari	11	11	2	7	7
(Pakistan) Ahmad Al Zabidi	4	12	6
2	(Hong Kong) Max Lee	11	14	11

Quarter finals
(Pakistan) Farhan Mehboob	11	11	11
5	(Hong Kong) Leo Au	5	5	6
7	(Pakistan) Nasir Iqbal	8	9	8
3	(Kuwait) Abdullah Al Muzayen	11	11	11
4	(Malaysia) Mohd Nafi. Adnan	11	9	9	11	9
6	(Pakistan) Aamir Atlas Khan	7	11	11	3	11
8	(Malaysia) Muhd Asyraf Azan	11	3	11	11
2	(Hong Kong) Max Lee	9	11	9	9

Semi finals
(Pakistan) Farhan Mehboob	8	3	12
3	(Kuwait) Abdullah Al Muzayen	11	11	14
Final
3	(Kuwait) Abdullah Al Muzayen	9	3	8
6	(Pakistan) Aamir Atlas Khan	11	11	11
6	(Pakistan) Aamir Atlas Khan	11	11	11
8	(Malaysia) Muhd Asyraf Azan	5	6	6

== See also ==
- 2013 Women's Asian Individual Squash Championships
- Asian Individual Squash Championships

Preceded by Malaysia (Penang); 2011	Asian Squash Championships; Pakistan (Islamabad); 2013	Succeeded by Kuwait; 2015
