= Squash at the 2014 Asian Games – Men's singles =

Men's singles at the 2014 Asian Games
- Venue: Yeorumul Squash Courts
- Dates: 20–23 September 2014
- Competitors: 22 from 11 nations

Medalists
| gold medal | Abdullah Al-Muzayen | Kuwait |
| silver medal | Saurav Ghosal | India |
| bronze medal | Ong Beng Hee | Malaysia |
| bronze medal | Max Lee | Hong Kong |

The men's singles Squash event was part of the squash programme and took place between September 20 and 23, at the Yeorumul Squash Courts.

== Schedule ==
All times are Korea Standard Time (UTC+09:00)

| Date | Time | Event |
|---|---|---|
| Saturday, 20 September 2014 | 10:00 | Round of 32 |
| Saturday, 20 September 2014 | 18:00 | Round of 16 |
| Sunday, 21 November 2014 | 14:00 | Quarterfinals |
| Monday, 22 November 2014 | 16:00 | Semifinals |
| Tuesday, 23 November 2014 | 13:00 | Gold medal match |

== Results ==
=== Finals ===
| Semifinals | | | | | | | Gold medal match |
| 1 | Saurav Ghosal (IND) | 11 | 11 | 11 |
| 3 | Ong Beng Hee (MAS) | 9 | 4 | 5 | | | 1 | Saurav Ghosal (IND) | 12 | 11 | 12 | 8 | 9 |
| 7 | Abdullah Al-Muzayen (KUW) | 6 | 11 | 4 | 11 | 11 | 7 | Abdullah Al-Muzayen (KUW) | 10 | 2 | 14 | 11 | 11 |
| 2 | Max Lee (HKG) | 11 | 8 | 11 | 6 | 8 |

=== Top half ===
==== Section 1 ====
| Round of 32 | | | | | Round of 16 | | | | | | Quarterfinals |
| | | | | | 1 | Saurav Ghosal (IND) | 11 | 11 | 11 |
| | Shen Jiaqi (CHN) | 9 | 5 | 4 | 12 | Ahmad Al-Saraj (JOR) | 2 | 4 | 3 |
| 12 | Ahmad Al-Saraj (JOR) | 11 | 11 | 11 | | | | | | | 1 | Saurav Ghosal (IND) | 11 | 9 | 11 | 11 |
| 15 | Lee Se-hyun (KOR) | 11 | 11 | 11 | | | | | | | 6 | Nasir Iqbal (PAK) | 6 | 11 | 2 | 9 |
| | Sadam Mehawesh (QAT) | 7 | 4 | 1 | 15 | Lee Se-hyun (KOR) | 11 | 1 | 4 | 6 |
| | | | | | 6 | Nasir Iqbal (PAK) | 6 | 11 | 11 | 11 |

==== Section 2 ====
| Round of 32 | | | | | | Round of 16 | | | | | | Quarterfinals |
| | | | | | | 5 | Leo Au (HKG) | 11 | 14 | 11 | 11 |
| | Armando Amante (MAC) | 12 | 2 | 9 | | 16 | Shinnosuke Tsukue (JPN) | 8 | 16 | 4 | 8 |
| 16 | Shinnosuke Tsukue (JPN) | 14 | 11 | 11 | | | | | | | | 5 | Leo Au (HKG) | 8 | 11 | 9 | 7 |
| 11 | Farhan Mehboob (PAK) | 8 | 11 | 11 | 11 | | | | | | | 3 | Ong Beng Hee (MAS) | 11 | 9 | 11 | 11 |
| | Mohammad Al-Saraj (JOR) | 11 | 1 | 2 | 4 | 11 | Farhan Mehboob (PAK) | 9 | 6 | 3 |
| | | | | | | 3 | Ong Beng Hee (MAS) | 11 | 11 | 11 |

=== Bottom half ===
==== Section 3 ====
| Round of 32 | | | | | Round of 16 | | | | | Quarterfinals |
| | | | | | 4 | Mohd Nafiizwan Adnan (MAS) | 11 | 11 | 11 |
| | Wang Junjie (CHN) | 11 | 11 | 11 | | Wang Junjie (CHN) | 5 | 7 | 6 |
| 13 | Liu Tsun Man (MAC) | 3 | 5 | 4 | | | | | | 4 | Mohd Nafiizwan Adnan (MAS) | 7 | 11 | 6 | 6 |
| | | | | | | | | | | 7 | Abdullah Al-Muzayen (KUW) | 11 | 6 | 11 | 11 |
| | | | | | 9 | Harinder Pal Sandhu (IND) | 4 | 6 | 2 |
| | | | | | 7 | Abdullah Al-Muzayen (KUW) | 11 | 11 | 11 |

==== Section 4 ====
| Round of 32 | | | | | Round of 16 | | | | | | | Quarterfinals |
| | | | | | 8 | Abdulla Al-Tamimi (QAT) | 11 | 5 | 12 | 12 | 11 |
| | | | | | 10 | Ammar Al-Tamimi (KUW) | 9 | 11 | 14 | 10 | 7 |
| | | | | | | | | | | | | 8 | Abdulla Al-Tamimi (QAT) | 4 | 5 | 11 | 11 | 2 |
| 14 | Yuta Fukui (JPN) | 8 | 3 | 4 | | | | | | | | 2 | Max Lee (HKG) | 11 | 11 | 9 | 8 | 11 |
| | Lee Seung-joon (KOR) | 11 | 11 | 11 | | Lee Seung-joon (KOR) | 6 | 11 | 8 | 5 |
| | | | | | 2 | Max Lee (HKG) | 11 | 7 | 11 | 11 |
