= Squash at the 2010 Asian Games – Men's singles =

Men's singles at the 2010 Asian Games
- Venue: Asian Games Town Gymnasium
- Dates: 18–21 November 2010
- Competitors: 23 from 12 nations

Medalists
| gold medal | Mohd Azlan Iskandar | Malaysia |
| silver medal | Aamir Atlas Khan | Pakistan |
| bronze medal | Saurav Ghosal | India |
| bronze medal | Ong Beng Hee | Malaysia |

The men's singles squash event was part of the squash programme at the 2010 Asian Games and took place from 18 to 21 November at the Asian Games Town Gymnasium.

== Schedule ==
All times are China Standard Time (UTC+08:00)

| Date | Time | Event |
|---|---|---|
| Thursday, 18 November 2010 | 09:30 | Round 1 |
| Thursday, 18 November 2010 | 18:00 | Round 2 |
| Friday, 19 November 2010 | 15:00 | Quarterfinals |
| Saturday, 20 November 2010 | 17:00 | Semifinals |
| Sunday, 21 November 2010 | 17:00 | Final |

== Results ==
=== Finals ===
| Semifinals | | | | | | Final |
| 1 | Mohd Azlan Iskandar (MAS) | 11 | 6 | 11 | 12 |
| 4 | Saurav Ghosal (IND) | 5 | 11 | 5 | 10 | 1 | Mohd Azlan Iskandar (MAS) | 11 | 11 | 11 |
| 3 | Aamir Atlas Khan (PAK) | 11 | 11 | 9 | 15 | 3 | Aamir Atlas Khan (PAK) | 6 | 7 | 6 |
| 2 | Ong Beng Hee (MAS) | 5 | 8 | 11 | 13 |

=== Top half ===
==== Section 1 ====
| Round 1 | | | | | | Round 2 | | | | | Quarterfinals |
| | | | | | | 1 | Mohd Azlan Iskandar (MAS) | 11 | 11 | 11 |
| | Abdulrahman Al-Malki (QAT) | 11 | 3 | 1 | 6 | 14 | Lee Nyeon-ho (KOR) | 1 | 9 | 7 |
| 14 | Lee Nyeon-ho (KOR) | 4 | 11 | 11 | 11 | | | | | | 1 | Mohd Azlan Iskandar (MAS) | 3 | 11 | 11 | 11 |
| | | | | | | | | | | | 6 | Max Lee (HKG) | 11 | 5 | 4 | 6 |
| | | | | | | 16 | Meng Xiaomin (CHN) | 3 | 3 | 3 |
| | | | | | | 6 | Max Lee (HKG) | 11 | 11 | 11 |

==== Section 2 ====
| Round 1 | | | | | Round 2 | | | | | | Quarterfinals |
| | | | | | 7 | Siddharth Suchde (IND) | 9 | 11 | 11 | 11 |
| | Naif Abureqah (KSA) | 2 | 1 | 6 | 9 | Dick Lau (HKG) | 11 | 4 | 6 | 4 |
| 9 | Dick Lau (HKG) | 11 | 11 | 11 | | | | | | | 7 | Siddharth Suchde (IND) | 6 | 6 | 7 |
| 11 | Ammar Al-Tamimi (IOC) | 11 | 11 | 11 | | | | | | | 4 | Saurav Ghosal (IND) | 11 | 11 | 11 |
| | Navin Samarasinghe (SRI) | 9 | 9 | 3 | 11 | Ammar Al-Tamimi (IOC) | 4 | 4 | 5 |
| | | | | | 4 | Saurav Ghosal (IND) | 11 | 11 | 11 |

=== Bottom half ===
==== Section 3 ====
| Round 1 | | | | | Round 2 | | | | | Quarterfinals |
| | | | | | 3 | Aamir Atlas Khan (PAK) | 11 | 11 | 11 |
| | Wang Junjie (CHN) | 7 | 2 | 3 | 10 | Ahmad Al-Zubaidi (JOR) | 5 | 7 | 5 |
| 10 | Ahmad Al-Zubaidi (JOR) | 11 | 11 | 11 | | | | | | 3 | Aamir Atlas Khan (PAK) | 11 | 11 | 10 | 11 |
| 13 | Shinnosuke Tsukue (JPN) | 11 | 11 | 11 | | | | | | 5 | Farhan Mehboob (PAK) | 7 | 5 | 12 | 8 |
| | Gihan Suwaris (SRI) | 5 | 3 | 9 | 13 | Shinnosuke Tsukue (JPN) | 7 | 5 | 4 |
| | | | | | 5 | Farhan Mehboob (PAK) | 11 | 11 | 11 |

==== Section 4 ====
| Round 1 | | | | | Round 2 | | | | | Quarterfinals |
| | | | | | 8 | Abdullah Al-Muzayen (IOC) | 11 | 11 | 11 |
| | Ahmed Al-Tamimi (QAT) | 2 | 5 | 9 | 15 | Lee Seung-joon (KOR) | 2 | 7 | 3 |
| 15 | Lee Seung-joon (KOR) | 11 | 11 | 11 | | | | | | 8 | Abdullah Al-Muzayen (IOC) | 11 | 7 | 11 | 11 | 3 |
| 12 | Yuta Fukui (JPN) | 11 | 11 | 11 | | | | | | 2 | Ong Beng Hee (MAS) | 4 | 11 | 13 | 9 | 11 |
| | Mohammed Al-Saif (KSA) | 3 | 1 | 2 | 12 | Yuta Fukui (JPN) | 2 | 7 | 5 |
| | | | | | 2 | Ong Beng Hee (MAS) | 11 | 11 | 11 |
