= Men's Malaysian Open Squash Championships 2011 =

Malaysian Open 2011

Details
- Event name: Malaysian Open Squash Championships 2011
- Location: Kuala Lumpur Malaysia
- Venue: National Squash Centre; Bukit Jalil
- Website www.squashsite.co.uk/2009/malaysian2012.htm

Men's Winner
- Category: International 50
- Prize money: $50,000
- Year: World Tour 2011

The Men's Malaysian Open Squash Championships 2011 is the men's edition of the 2011 Malaysian Open Squash Championships, which is a tournament of the PSA World Tour event International, an event offering a prize of $50,000. The event took place in Kuala Lumpur in Malaysia from 20 July to 23 July. Grégory Gaultier won his first Malaysian Open trophy, beating Aamir Atlas Khan in the final.

== Prize money and ranking points ==
For 2011, the prize purse is $50,000. The prize money and points breakdown is as follows:

Prize money Malaysian Open (2011)
Event	W	F	SF	QF	1R
Points (PSA)	875	575	350	215	125
Prize money	$8,075	$5,525	$3,615	$2,230	$1,275

== Seeds ==
1. (France) Grégory Gaultier (champion)
2. (Egypt) Mohamed El Shorbagy (quarterfinals)
3. (Malaysia) Mohd Azlan Iskandar (quarterfinals)
4. (Egypt) Hisham Mohd Ashour (first round)

== Draw and results ==
First round
1	(France) Grégory Gaultier	11	11	11
Q	(Malaysia) Mohd Nafi. Adnan	3	3	2
(Malaysia) Ong Beng Hee	11	11	11
Q	(Australia) Ryan Cuskelly	6	9	5
Q	(Egypt) Karim Abdel Gawad	9	11	18	9	11
(Pakistan) Farhan Mehboob	11	6	16	11	9
Q	(Scotland) Alan Clyne	11	5	7	11	15
4	(Egypt) Hisham Ashour	7	11	11	9	13
3	(Malaysia) Mohd Azlan Iskandar	11	12	11
WC	(Malaysia) Kamran Khan	5	10	7
(England) Chris Ryder	7	11	7	11	7
(Pakistan) Aamir Atlas Khan	11	3	11	3	11
(Egypt) Tarek Momen	7	9	8
(Australia) Cameron Pilley	11	11	11
(Australia) Aaron Frankcomb	6	5	9
2	(Egypt) Mohd El Shorbagy	11	11	11

Quarter finals
1	(France) Grégory Gaultier	12	11	11
(Malaysia) Ong Beng Hee	10	2	7
Q	(Egypt) Karim Abdel Gawad	6	6	4
Q	(Scotland) Alan Clyne	11	11	11
3	(Malaysia) Mohd Azlan Iskandar	5	12	9	6
(Pakistan) Aamir Atlas Khan	11	10	11	11
(Australia) Cameron Pilley	11	11	14
2	(Egypt) Mohd El Shorbagy	6	6	12

Semi finals
1	(France) Grégory Gaultier	11	11	11
Q	(Scotland) Alan Clyne	5	5	1
(Pakistan) Aamir Atlas Khan	10	11	11	11
(Australia) Cameron Pilley	12	6	4	9

Final
1	(France) Grégory Gaultier	11	11	11
(Pakistan) Aamir Atlas Khan	8	3	3

== See also ==
- PSA World Tour 2011
- Malaysian Open Squash Championships
- Women's Malaysian Open Squash Championships 2011
