= Squash at the 2010 Asian Games – Men's team =

Men's team at the 2010 Asian Games
- Venue: Asian Games Town Gymnasium
- Dates: 21–25 November 2010
- Competitors: 41 from 11 nations

Medalists
gold medal	Pakistan; Yasir Butt, Aamir Atlas Khan, Danish Atlas Khan, Farhan Mehboob
silver medal	Malaysia; Mohd Nafiizwan Adnan, Mohd Azlan Iskandar, Ong Beng Hee, Ivan Yuen
bronze medal	India; Saurav Ghosal, Sandeep Jangra, Harinder Pal Sandhu, Siddharth Suchde
bronze medal	Hong Kong; Leo Au, Kwong Yu Shun, Dick Lau, Max Lee

The men's team squash event was part of the squash programme at the 2010 Asian Games. The matches were held from 21 until 25 November, at the Asian Games Town Gymnasium. Team Pakistan won the gold medal after remaining undefeated throughout the event and defeating Malaysia in straight games in the final.

== Schedule ==
All times are China Standard Time (UTC+08:00)

Date	Time	Event
Sunday, 21 November 2010	09:30	Preliminary round
Monday, 22 November 2010	09:30	Preliminary round
Tuesday, 23 November 2010	09:30	Preliminary round
Wednesday, 24 November 2010	14:00	Semifinals
Thursday, 25 November 2010	14:00	Final

== Results ==
=== Preliminary round ===
==== Pool A ====
Pos	Team	Pld	W	L	MF	MA	Pts	Qualification
1	Pakistan	4	4	0	11	1	4	Semifinals
2	Hong Kong	4	3	1	8	4	3	Semifinals
3	Athletes from Kuwait	4	2	2	8	4	2	
4	Sri Lanka	4	1	3	3	9	1	
5	China	4	0	4	0	12	0	

Source: ASF

21 November	Athletes from Kuwait	3–0	China

Nasser Al-Ramezi	3–0	Wang Junjie	11–3, 11–1, 11–7
Abdullah Al-Muzayen	3–0	Meng Xiaomin	11–2, 11–2, 11–0
Ammar Al-Tamimi	3–0	Shen Jiaqi	11–3, 11–1, 11–3

21 November	Hong Kong	3–0	Sri Lanka

Leo Au	3–0	Gihan Suwaris	11–4, 11–8, 11–0
Max Lee	3–0	Navin Samarasinghe	11–7, 11–5, 11–7
Kwong Yu Shun	3–0	Binura Jayasuriya	11–9, 11–3, 11–7

22 November	Pakistan	3–0	Sri Lanka

Farhan Mehboob	3–0	Navin Samarasinghe	12–10, 11–2, 11–3
Yasir Butt	3–1	Gihan Suwaris	14–12, 8–11, 11–1, 11–9
Danish Atlas Khan	3–0	Binura Jayasuriya	11–6, 11–7, 11–2

22 November	Athletes from Kuwait	1–2	Hong Kong

Abdullah Al-Muzayen	3–0	Max Lee	11–5, 13–11, 11–5
Ammar Al-Tamimi	0–3	Dick Lau	4–11, 2–11, 4–11
Falah Fayez	0–3	Leo Au	11–13, 6–11, 4–11

22 November	Hong Kong	3–0	China

Max Lee	3–0	Meng Xiaomin	11–3, 11–2, 11–4
Leo Au	3–0	Wang Junjie	11–2, 11–7, 11–4
Kwong Yu Shun	3–0	Shen Jiaqi	11–5, 11–2, 11–9

22 November	Pakistan	2–1	Athletes from Kuwait

Aamir Atlas Khan	1–3	Abdullah Al-Muzayen	11–9, 9–11, 4–11, 2–11
Farhan Mehboob	3–0	Nasser Al-Ramezi	11–8, 11–4, 11–7
Danish Atlas Khan	3–0	Falah Fayez	11–9, 11–2, 11–7

23 November	Pakistan	3–0	China

Farhan Mehboob	3–0	Wang Junjie	11–5, 11–5, 11–6
Aamir Atlas Khan	3–0	Meng Xiaomin	11–0, 11–5, 11–6
Yasir Butt	3–0	Shen Jiaqi	11–3, 11–7, 11–3

23 November	Athletes from Kuwait	3–0	Sri Lanka

Nasser Al-Ramezi	3–0	Gihan Suwaris	11–4, 11–9, 11–2
Abdullah Al-Muzayen	3–0	Navin Samarasinghe	11–1, 11–5, 11–6
Ammar Al-Tamimi	3–0	Binura Jayasuriya	11–7, 11–2, 11–5

23 November	Pakistan	3–0	Hong Kong

Farhan Mehboob	3–0	Dick Lau	11–4, 11–5, 11–8
Aamir Atlas Khan	3–1	Max Lee	1–11, 11–7, 11–8, 12–10
Danish Atlas Khan	3–1	Kwong Yu Shun	10–12, 11–3, 11–4, 11–7

23 November	Sri Lanka	3–0	China

Gihan Suwaris	3–2	Wang Junjie	7–11, 11–6, 11–4, 5–11, 11–5
Navin Samarasinghe	3–1	Meng Xiaomin	11–6, 11–8, 9–11, 11–6
Binura Jayasuriya	3–2	Shen Jiaqi	9–11, 11–8, 11–9, 8–11, 11–5

==== Pool B ====
Pos	Team	Pld	W	L	MF	MA	Pts	Qualification
1	Malaysia	5	5	0	14	1	5	Semifinals
2	India	5	4	1	13	2	4	Semifinals
3	Japan	5	3	2	8	7	3	
4	South Korea	5	2	3	7	8	2	
5	Qatar	5	1	4	2	13	1	
6	Saudi Arabia	5	0	5	1	14	0	

Source: ASF

21 November	Malaysia	3–0	Saudi Arabia

Mohd Nafiizwan Adnan	3–0	Naif Abureqah	11–1, 11–7, 11–4
Ong Beng Hee	3–0	Mohammed Al-Saif	11–7, 14–12, 11–7
Ivan Yuen	3–0	Taher Al-Botayan	11–2, 11–5, 11–5

21 November	India	3–0	Qatar

Harinder Pal Sandhu	3–0	Ahmed Al-Tamimi	11–8, 11–2, 11–0
Siddharth Suchde	3–0	Abdulrahman Al-Malki	11–3, 11–2, 11–6
Sandeep Jangra	3–2	Abdulla Al-Tamimi	9–11, 11–7, 10–12, 11–6, 11–7

21 November	Japan	2–1	South Korea

Shinnosuke Tsukue	3–0	Lee Seung-joon	11–7, 11–7, 11–5
Yuta Fukui	3–0	Lee Nyeon-ho	11–8, 11–3, 11–9
Takanori Shimizu	0–3	Lee Se-hyun	7–11, 7–11, 5–11

22 November	Malaysia	3–0	Qatar

Mohd Azlan Iskandar	3–0	Ahmed Al-Tamimi	11–2, 11–5, 11–5
Mohd Nafiizwan Adnan	3–0	Abdulla Al-Tamimi	11–9, 11–9, 11–4
Ivan Yuen	3–0	Omer Abdulla Ahmed	11–4, 11–1, 11–1

22 November	South Korea	3–0	Saudi Arabia

Lee Seung-joon	3–0	Ahmed Abureqah	11–5, 11–6, 11–8
Lee Se-hyun	3–1	Mohammed Al-Saif	6–11, 11–7, 11–6, 11–4
Lee Seung-taek	3–2	Naif Abureqah	11–9, 3–11, 8–11, 11–8, 11–5

22 November	India	3–0	Japan

Saurav Ghosal	3–0	Yuta Fukui	11–6, 11–2, 11–6
Siddharth Suchde	3–0	Shinnosuke Tsukue	11–5, 12–10, 11–6
Harinder Pal Sandhu	3–0	Takanori Shimizu	11–9, 11–7, 12–10

22 November	Malaysia	3–0	South Korea

Ong Beng Hee	3–0	Lee Nyeon-ho	11–8, 11–5, 11–8
Mohd Nafiizwan Adnan	3–1	Lee Se-hyun	5–11, 11–8, 11–6, 11–7
Ivan Yuen	3–0	Lee Seung-taek	11–3, 13–11, 11–6

22 November	Japan	3–0	Qatar

Yuta Fukui	3–0	Abdulrahman Al-Malki	11–8, 11–4, 11–5
Shinnosuke Tsukue	3–0	Ahmed Al-Tamimi	11–2, 11–7, 11–4
Takanori Shimizu	3–2	Abdulla Al-Tamimi	13–11, 12–10, 13–15, 11–13, 11–7

22 November	India	3–0	Saudi Arabia

Saurav Ghosal	3–0	Ahmed Abureqah	11–3, 11–6, 11–2
Harinder Pal Sandhu	3–1	Naif Abureqah	11–3, 11–4, 9–11, 11–9
Sandeep Jangra	3–0	Taher Al-Botayan	11–4, 11–3, 11–3

23 November	Malaysia	3–0	Japan

Mohd Nafiizwan Adnan	3–0	Shinnosuke Tsukue	11–6, 11–7, 11–8
Ong Beng Hee	3–0	Yuta Fukui	11–6, 11–4, 11–8
Ivan Yuen	3–0	Takanori Shimizu	11–6, 11–6, 12–10

23 November	India	3–0	South Korea

Siddharth Suchde	3–0	Lee Seung-joon	11–6, 11–6, 11–6
Saurav Ghosal	3–0	Lee Nyeon-ho	11–5, 11–7, 11–6
Sandeep Jangra	3–0	Lee Seung-taek	11–9, 11–8, 13–11

23 November	Qatar	2–1	Saudi Arabia

Ahmed Al-Tamimi	3–2	Mohammed Al-Saif	7–11, 12–10, 10–12, 11–8, 11–5
Abdulrahman Al-Malki	3–0	Ahmed Abureqah	11–5, 13–11, 11–8
Abdulla Al-Tamimi	0–3	Naif Abureqah	8–11, 8–11, 9–11

23 November	Malaysia	2–1	India

Mohd Nafiizwan Adnan	3–2	Siddharth Suchde	8–11, 8–11, 11–8, 11–4, 11–9
Mohd Azlan Iskandar	1–3	Saurav Ghosal	2–11, 9–11, 11–7, 5–11
Ivan Yuen	3–2	Harinder Pal Sandhu	11–9, 6–11, 11–6, 4–11, 12–10

23 November	Japan	3–0	Saudi Arabia

Shinnosuke Tsukue	3–0	Mohammed Al-Saif	11–7, 11–5, 11–4
Yuta Fukui	3–0	Ahmed Abureqah	11–8, 11–2, 11–9
Takanori Shimizu	3–0	Naif Abureqah	11–3, 11–1, 11–7

23 November	South Korea	3–0	Qatar

Lee Se-hyun	3–2	Abdulla Al-Tamimi	11–2, 11–7, 8–11, 8–11, 11–4
Lee Seung-joon	3–1	Abdulrahman Al-Malki	11–9, 11–9, 4–11, 11–2
Lee Seung-taek	3–0	Omer Abdulla Ahmed	11–5, 11–3, 11–3

=== Knockout round ===
Semifinals			Final
A1	Pakistan	2
B2	India	0	A1	Pakistan	2
B1	Malaysia	2	B1	Malaysia	0
A2	Hong Kong	0

==== Semifinals ====
24 November	Pakistan	2–0	India

Farhan Mehboob	3–1	Siddharth Suchde	16–14, 10–12, 11–9, 11–5
Aamir Atlas Khan	3–1	Saurav Ghosal	15–13, 5–11, 11–5, 11–6

24 November	Malaysia	2–0	Hong Kong

Mohd Nafiizwan Adnan	3–2	Dick Lau	9–11, 11–6, 6–11, 11–2, 11–6
Mohd Azlan Iskandar	3–0	Max Lee	11–4, 11–5, 11–4

==== Final ====
25 November	Pakistan	2–0	Malaysia

Farhan Mehboob	3–0	Ong Beng Hee	11–4, 11–4, 11–7
Aamir Atlas Khan	3–0	Mohd Azlan Iskandar	14–12, 15–13, 11–4
