= Squash at the 2014 Asian Games – Women's singles =

Women's singles at the 2014 Asian Games
- Venue: Yeorumul Squash Courts
- Dates: 20–23 September 2014
- Competitors: 15 from 8 nations

Medalists
gold medal	Nicol David	Malaysia
silver medal	Low Wee Wern	Malaysia
bronze medal	Dipika Pallikal	India
bronze medal	Annie Au	Hong Kong

The women's singles Squash event was part of the squash programme and took place between September 20 and 23, at the Yeorumul Squash Courts.

== Schedule ==
All times are Korea Standard Time (UTC+09:00)

Date	Time	Event
Saturday, 20 September 2014	17:00	Round of 16
Sunday, 21 November 2014	14:00	Quarterfinals
Monday, 22 November 2014	14:00	Semifinals
Tuesday, 23 November 2014	12:00	Gold medal match

== Results ==
=== Final ===
Gold medal match
1	Nicol David (MAS)	9	11	11	12
2	Low Wee Wern (MAS)	11	6	5	10

=== Top half ===
Round of 16
Moqaddas Ashraf (PAK)	2	5	4
7	Misaki Kobayashi (JPN)	11	11	11
5	Joshna Chinappa (IND)	11	11	11
Song Sun-mi (KOR)	9	7	7
Gu Jinyue (CHN)	6	12	6	4
4	Dipika Pallikal (IND)	11	10	11	11

Quarterfinals
1	Nicol David (MAS)	11	11	11
7	Misaki Kobayashi (JPN)	7	5	7
5	Joshna Chinappa (IND)	11	9	8	17	9
4	Dipika Pallikal (IND)	7	11	11	15	11

Semifinals
1	Nicol David (MAS)	11	11	11
4	Dipika Pallikal (IND)	4	4	5

=== Bottom half ===
Round of 16
3	Annie Au (HKG)	11	11	10	11
Chinatsu Matsui (JPN)	2	3	12	6
Li Dongjin (CHN)	11	11	1	2
8	Maria Toorpakai Wazir (PAK)	9	13	11	11
6	Joey Chan (HKG)	11	11	11
Liu Kwai Chi (MAC)	2	5	1
Park Eun-ok (KOR)	6	9	6
2	Low Wee Wern (MAS)	11	11	11

Quarterfinals
3	Annie Au (HKG)	11	11	11
8	Maria Toorpakai Wazir (PAK)	3	4	4
6	Joey Chan (HKG)	6	11	6	5
2	Low Wee Wern (MAS)	11	8	11	11

Semifinals
3	Annie Au (HKG)	9	5	5
2	Low Wee Wern (MAS)	11	11	11
