= Squash at the 2010 Asian Games – Women's singles =

Women's singles at the 2010 Asian Games
- Venue: Asian Games Town Gymnasium
- Dates: 18–21 November 2010
- Competitors: 16 from 8 nations

Medalists
gold medal	Nicol David	Malaysia
silver medal	Annie Au	Hong Kong
bronze medal	Low Wee Wern	Malaysia
bronze medal	Joey Chan	Hong Kong

The women's singles squash event was part of the squash programme at the 2010 Asian Games and took place from 18 to 21 November, at the Asian Games Town Gymnasium.

== Schedule ==
All times are China Standard Time (UTC+08:00)

Date	Time	Event
Thursday, 18 November 2010	11:30	Round 1
Friday, 19 November 2010	09:30	Quarterfinals
Saturday, 20 November 2010	15:00	Semifinals
Sunday, 21 November 2010	16:00	Final

== Results ==
=== Final ===
Final
1	Nicol David (MAS)	11	8	11	11
2	Annie Au (HKG)	8	11	6	7

=== Top half ===
Round 1
1	Nicol David (MAS)	11	11	11
Park Eun-ok (KOR)	3	7	6
Gu Jinyue (CHN)	4	10	1
5	Dipika Pallikal (IND)	11	12	11
6	Joshna Chinappa (IND)	11	11	11
Jemyca Aribado (PHI)	6	7	4
Chinatsu Matsui (JPN)	10	4	8
3	Low Wee Wern (MAS)	12	11	11

Quarterfinals
1	Nicol David (MAS)	11	7	11	11
5	Dipika Pallikal (IND)	8	11	6	4
6	Joshna Chinappa (IND)	11	11	8	9	3
3	Low Wee Wern (MAS)	7	9	11	11	11

Semifinals
1	Nicol David (MAS)	11	11	11
3	Low Wee Wern (MAS)	9	3	4

=== Bottom half ===
Round 1
4	Joey Chan (HKG)	11	11	11
Saima Shoukat (PAK)	2	3	3
Li Dongjin (CHN)	8	11	8	6
7	Song Sun-mi (KOR)	11	6	11	11
8	Misaki Kobayashi (JPN)	11	11	11
Aysah Dalida (PHI)	6	4	4
Maria Toorpakai Wazir (PAK)	7	8	3
2	Annie Au (HKG)	11	11	11

Quarterfinals
4	Joey Chan (HKG)	11	11	11
7	Song Sun-mi (KOR)	6	5	2
8	Misaki Kobayashi (JPN)	3	8	12	6
2	Annie Au (HKG)	11	11	10	11

Semifinals
4	Joey Chan (HKG)	7	11	9	9
2	Annie Au (HKG)	11	2	11	11
