= Tsukue =

Tsukue (written: 机) is a Japanese surname. Notable people with the surname include:

- Ryūnosuke Tsukue (机 龍之介, born 1997), Japanese squash player
- Shinnosuke Tsukue (机 伸之介, born 1989), Japanese squash player
