= Squash at the Asian Games =

- Governing bodies: WSF (World) / ASF (Asia)
- Events: 5 (men: 2; women: 2; mixed: 1)

Games
- 1951; 1954; 1958; 1962; 1966; 1970; 1974; 1978; 1982; 1986; 1990; 1994; 1998; 2002; 2006; 2010; 2014; 2018; 2022; 2026
- Medalists

Squash is an Asian Games sport since the 1998 edition and has been held at every edition since.

== Editions ==
| Games | Year | Host city | Best nation |
|---|---|---|---|
| XIII | 1998 | Bangkok, Thailand | Pakistan |
| XIV | 2002 | Busan, South Korea | Malaysia |
| XV | 2006 | Doha, Qatar | Malaysia |
| XVI | 2010 | Guangzhou, China | Malaysia |
| XVII | 2014 | Incheon, South Korea | Malaysia |
| XVIII | 2018 | Jakarta–Palembang, Indonesia | Hong Kong |
| XIX | 2022 | Hangzhou, China | Malaysia |
| XX | 2026 | Aichi–Nagoya, Japan | Malaysia |

== Events ==
| Event | 98 | 02 | 06 | 10 | 14 | 18 | 22 | 26 | Years |
|---|---|---|---|---|---|---|---|---|---|
| Men's singles | X | X | X | X | X | X | X | X | 8 |
| Men's team | | | | X | X | X | X | X | 5 |
| Women's singles | X | X | X | X | X | X | X | X | 8 |
| Women's team | | | | X | X | X | X | X | 5 |
| Mixed doubles | | | | | | | X | X | 2 |
| Total | 2 | 2 | 2 | 4 | 4 | 4 | 5 | 5 | |

== Medal table ==
| Rank | Nation | Gold | Silver | Bronze | Total |
|---|---|---|---|---|---|
| 1 | Malaysia (MAS) | 18 | 7 | 11 | 36 |
| 2 | Hong Kong (HKG) | 4 | 10 | 14 | 28 |
| 3 | India (IND) | 3 | 6 | 14 | 23 |
| 4 | Pakistan (PAK) | 2 | 5 | 5 | 12 |
| 5 | Kuwait (KUW) | 1 | 0 | 1 | 2 |
| 6 | Japan (JPN) | 0 | 0 | 4 | 4 |
| 6 | South Korea (KOR) | 0 | 0 | 4 | 4 |
| 8 | Singapore (SGP) | 0 | 0 | 2 | 2 |
| 9 | Qatar (QAT) | 0 | 0 | 1 | 1 |
| Totals (9 entries) | | 28 | 28 | 56 | 112 |

== Participating nations ==
| Nation | 98 | 02 | 06 | 10 | 14 | 18 | 22 | 26 | Years |
|---|---|---|---|---|---|---|---|---|---|
| Bahrain | | | 2 | | | | | | 1 |
| China | | 2 | 2 | 6 | 8 | 4 | 2 | 8 | 7 |
| Hong Kong | 4 | 4 | 4 | 8 | 8 | 8 | 8 | 8 | 8 |
| India | 2 | 4 | 3 | 8 | 8 | 8 | 8 | 8 | 8 |
| Indonesia | | | | | | 8 | | 2 | 2 |
| Iran | 2 | | | | | 5 | | 4 | 3 |
| Iraq | | | 1 | | | | | | 1 |
| Japan | 3 | 3 | 2 | 6 | 6 | 6 | 6 | 8 | 8 |
| Jordan | 3 | 1 | 2 | 1 | 4 | | | 1 | 6 |
| Kuwait | 2 | 2 | 1 | 4 | 4 | 1 | 4 | 4 | 8 |
| Lebanon | | | 3 | | | | | 1 | 2 |
| Macau | | | 4 | | 3 | 3 | 4 | 4 | 5 |
| Malaysia | 4 | 4 | 4 | 8 | 8 | 8 | 8 | 8 | 8 |
| Mongolia | | | | | | 4 | 5 | 8 | 3 |
| Nepal | | | | | | 4 | 6 | 2 | 3 |
| Pakistan | 2 | 2 | 2 | 7 | 8 | 8 | 8 | 8 | 8 |
| Philippines | | 1 | 2 | 2 | | 8 | 6 | 6 | 6 |
| Qatar | | 2 | 2 | 4 | 4 | 4 | 4 | 4 | 7 |
| Saudi Arabia | | | | 4 | | | | 1 | 2 |
| Singapore | 3 | 1 | | | | 4 | 4 | 5 | 5 |
| South Korea | 2 | 4 | 4 | 8 | 8 | 8 | 8 | 8 | 8 |
| Sri Lanka | 2 | 2 | 4 | 3 | | 4 | 3 | 3 | 7 |
| Thailand | 4 | | | | | 8 | 8 | 4 | 4 |
| Uzbekistan | | | | | | | | 4 | 1 |
| Number of nations | 12 | 13 | 16 | 13 | 11 | 18 | 16 | 22 | |
| Number of athletes | 33 | 32 | 42 | 69 | 69 | 103 | 92 | 109 | |

== Finals ==
=== Men's singles ===
| Year | Champions | Runners-up | Score |
|---|---|---|---|
| 1998 | Zarak Jahan Khan (PAK) | Amjad Khan (PAK) | 1–9, 9–0, 6–9, 9–7, 9–3 |
| 2002 | Ong Beng Hee (MAS) | Mansoor Zaman (PAK) | 9–0, 9–7, 9–0 |
| 2006 | Ong Beng Hee (MAS) | Mohd Azlan Iskandar (MAS) | 5–9, 9–1, 10–9, 9–5 |
| 2010 | Mohd Azlan Iskandar (MAS) | Aamir Atlas Khan (PAK) | 11–6, 11–7, 11–6 |
| 2014 | Abdullah Al-Muzayen (KUW) | Saurav Ghosal (IND) | 10–12, 2–11, 14–12, 11–8, 11–9 |
| 2018 | Leo Au (HKG) | Max Lee (HKG) | 11–8, 12–10, 6–11, 11–4 |
| 2022 | Ng Eain Yow (MAS) | Saurav Ghosal (IND) | 9–11, 11–9, 11–5, 11–7 |
| 2026 | Ng Eain Yow (MAS) | Abhay Singh (IND) | 11–9, 11–5, 11–5 |

=== Women's singles ===
| Year | Champions | Runners-up | Score |
|---|---|---|---|
| 1998 | Nicol David (MAS) | Rebecca Chiu (HKG) | 9–3, 9–1, 9–6 |
| 2002 | Rebecca Chiu (HKG) | Nicol David (MAS) | 9–7, 9–5, 9–7 |
| 2006 | Nicol David (MAS) | Rebecca Chiu (HKG) | 9–0, 9–3, 9–3 |
| 2010 | Nicol David (MAS) | Annie Au (HKG) | 11–8, 8–11, 11–6, 11–7 |
| 2014 | Nicol David (MAS) | Low Wee Wern (MAS) | 9–11, 11–6, 11–5, 12–10 |
| 2018 | Nicol David (MAS) | Sivasangari Subramaniam (MAS) | 11–13, 11–9, 5–11, 11–6, 11–8 |
| 2022 | Sivasangari Subramaniam (MAS) | Chan Sin Yuk (HKG) | 8–11, 15–13, 10–12, 11–9, 12–10 |
| 2026 | Sivasangari Subramaniam (MAS) | Anahat Singh (IND) | 11–4, 11–4, 11–7 |
