= Zoe Foo Yuk Han =

Malaysian squash player (born 1998)

Personal information
- Born: September 16, 1998 (age 27) Wilayah Persekutuan, Kuala Lumpur, Malaysia

Sport
- Coached by: Andrew Cross
- Racquet used: Prince
- Highest ranking: 93 (June 2015)
- Current ranking: 178 (October 2025)
- Title: 3

Chinese name
- Traditional Chinese: 傅玉嫻
- Simplified Chinese: 傅玉娴
- Hanyu Pinyin: Fù Yùxián
- Yale Romanization: Fuh Yuhk-hàahn
- Jyutping: Fu6 Juk6haan4

Zoe Foo Yuk Han (born 16 September 1998) is a Malaysian female squash player. She reached a career high ranking of 93 in the world during June 2015.

== Biography ==
Foo was educated at the Bukit Jalil Sports School and George Washington University.

Foo has also competed at the Asian Junior Squash Individual Championships, emerging as runners-up at the U15 division in 2012 and 2013. She was also the runners-up in the Girls U17 division Asian Junior Championships in 2014 and 2015 before making her international senior debut for Malaysian squash team. She resigned from the national team in 2017.

In September 2025, she won her second PSA title after securing victory in the Reliance PSA Challenger during the 2025–26 PSA Squash Tour. A third soon followed in October 2025, after securing victory on the China Squash Tour.
