= Kuwait at the 2014 Asian Games =

- IOC code: KUW
- NOC: Kuwait Olympic Committee

in Incheon
- Flag bearer: Fehaid Al-Deehani
- Medals Ranked 18th: Gold 3 Silver 5 Bronze 4 Total 12

Asian Games appearances (overview)
- 1974; 1978; 1982; 1986; 1990; 1994; 1998; 2002; 2006; 2010; 2014; 2018; 2022; 2026

Other related appearances
- Athletes from Kuwait (2010)

Kuwait participated in the 2014 Asian Games in Incheon, South Korea from 19 September to 4 October 2014. It won 3 gold, 5 silver and 4 bronze medals.

== Medal summary ==
Medal	Name	Sport	Event
Gold	Rashed Al-Mutairi	Karate	Men's kumite +84 kg
Gold	Abdullah Al-Rashidi	Shooting	Men's skeet
Gold	Abdullah Al-Muzayen	Squash	Men's singles
Silver	Hamad Al-Nweam	Karate	Men's kumite 84 kg
Silver	Fehaid Al-Deehani	Shooting	Men's trap
Silver	Fehaid Al-Deehani; Abdulrahman Al-Faihan; Khaled Al-Mudhaf	Shooting	Men's trap team
Silver	Fehaid Al-Deehani	Shooting	Men's double trap
Silver	Salah Al-Mutairi; Abdullah Al-Rashidi; Saud Habib	Shooting	Men's skeet team
Bronze	Ali Abdulaziz	Karate	Men's kumite 67 kg
Bronze	Ahmad Al-Afasi; Hamad Al-Afasi; Fehaid Al-Deehani	Shooting	Men's double trap team
Bronze	Abdullah Al-Muzayen; Ali Al-Ramezi; Ammar Al-Tamimi; Fallah Faez	Squash	Men's team
