= Anwesha Reddy =

Indian female squash player (born 1991)

Personal information
- Born: 3 September 1991 (age 35) Chennai, India

Sport
- Country: India
- Highest ranking: 86 (August 2010)
Medal record
Women's squash
Representing India
Asian Games
Bronze medal – third place	2010 Guangzhou	Team

Anwesha Reddy (born 3 September 1991) is an Indian female squash player. She was a member of the Indian women's squash team which claimed bronze medal at the 2010 Asian Games though she was a non-participant during the team event.

Anwesha also represented India at the 2010 Commonwealth Games and competed in the women's singles. She also competed in the 2010 Women's World Team Squash Championships and achieved her career best ranking of 86 during the tournament. Anwesha Reddy has trained at the ICL-TNSRA squash academy which is situated in Chennai.
