= Mahesh Mangaonkar =

Indian squash player (born 1994)

Personal information
- Born: 23 March 1994 (age 32) Mumbai, Maharashtra
- Height: 180
- Weight: 78

Sport
- Country: India
- Club: Cricket Club of India, Otters Club and Castelyn Squash Club
- Turned pro: 2009
- Coached by: Gopichand mohite
- Retired: Active
- Racquet used: Prince Sports

Men's singles
- Highest ranking: No. 44 (January, 2015)
- Current ranking: No. 61 (July, 2016)
Medal record
Men's squash
Representing India
Asian Games
Gold medal – first place	2014 Incheon	Team
Gold medal – first place	2022 Hangzhou	Team
Bronze medal – third place	2018 Jakarta	Team
- Updated on July, 2016

Mahesh Mangaonkar (born 23 March 1994 in Mumbai) is a professional squash player who represented India. He reached a career-high ranking of World No. 44 in January 2015. He won the prestigious British Junior Open Under-15 category in 2009.

Mangaonkar won the IMET Open 2013 in the Slovak capital Bratislava. He is the first Indian squash player to win the IMET Open. He was part of the Indian team that won the gold medal at the 2014 Asian Games at Incheon.
