= Siddharth Suchde =

Indian squash player (born 1985)

Personal information
- Born: 20 January 1985 (age 41) Mumbai, India
- Height: 6 ft (183 cm)
- Weight: 67 kg (148 lb)

Sport
- Country: India
- Turned pro: 2007
- Retired: 2012
- Racquet used: Black Knight

Men's singles
- Highest ranking: No. 39 (September 2012)
- Title: 1
- Tour final: 4
Medal record
Men's squash
Representing India
Asian Games
Bronze medal – third place	2010 Guangzhou	Team
- Updated on October 2017

Siddharth Suchde (born 20 January 1985, in Mumbai) is a professional squash player from India. He grew up in India, Scotland and Switzerland. He studied in Cathedral School in Bombay, and completed his high school education from Merchiston Castle School in Edinburgh, Scotland. Later, he attended Harvard University from 2003 to 2007 as an undergraduate, where he received a degree in economics.

== Squash career ==
The year that he graduated from Harvard, Suchde became national champion of college level squash in the US, after the title had eluded him during the first three years of his undergraduate life. His freshman year he placed fourth, sophomore year third and junior year he was runner-up in the same championship. He held the number one spot on the Harvard Crimson men's squash team for most of his time there.

After completing his education, Suchde moved to Harrogate, England, where he lived and trained and traveled all over the world to play squash. His highest world ranking was 39 in 2012. He was the second-highest ranked Indian squash player in the world. In 2012, Suchde retired from professional squash and founded LiveYourSport.com, an online sports e-commerce company.

== PSA Tour Titles ==
Year	Championship	Opponent in Final	Score in Final
2008	Regions Racquet Club Pro Series	(Mexico) César Salazar	11–9, 11–6, 11–4

== PSA Tour Finals (Runner-Up) ==
Year	Championship	Opponent in Final	Score in Final
2009	BC Open	(England) Laurence Delasaux	10–12, 3–11, 1–11
2005	Chennai Open	(India) Ritwik Bhattacharya	5–11, 5–11, 7–11
2007	Saskatoon Boast	(Mexico) Arturo Salazar	10–11, 7–11, 7–11
