= Squash at the 2010 Asian Games =

- Venue: Asian Games Town Gymnasium
- Dates: 18–25 November 2010
- Competitors: 69 from 13 nations

The Squash events at the 2010 Asian Games were held in Asian Games Town Gymnasium, Guangzhou, China from 18 to 25 November 2010.

Malaysia topped the medal table by winning three out of four possible gold medals.

== Schedule ==
P	Preliminary rounds	¼	Quarterfinals	½	Semifinals	F	Final

Event↓/Date →	18th Thu	19th Fri	20th Sat	21st Sun	22nd Mon	23rd Tue	24th Wed	25th Thu
Men's singles	P	¼	½	F				
Men's team				P	P	P	½	F
Women's singles	P	¼	½	F				
Women's team					P	P	½	F

== Medalists ==
Event	Gold	Silver	Bronze
Men's singles	Mohd Azlan Iskandar; Malaysia	Aamir Atlas Khan; Pakistan	Saurav Ghosal; India
Men's singles	Mohd Azlan Iskandar; Malaysia	Aamir Atlas Khan; Pakistan	Ong Beng Hee; Malaysia
Men's team	Pakistan; Yasir Butt; Aamir Atlas Khan; Danish Atlas Khan; Farhan Mehboob	Malaysia; Mohd Nafiizwan Adnan; Mohd Azlan Iskandar; Ong Beng Hee; Ivan Yuen	India; Saurav Ghosal; Sandeep Jangra; Harinder Pal Sandhu; Siddharth Suchde
Men's team	Pakistan; Yasir Butt; Aamir Atlas Khan; Danish Atlas Khan; Farhan Mehboob	Malaysia; Mohd Nafiizwan Adnan; Mohd Azlan Iskandar; Ong Beng Hee; Ivan Yuen	Hong Kong; Leo Au; Kwong Yu Shun; Dick Lau; Max Lee
Women's singles	Nicol David; Malaysia	Annie Au; Hong Kong	Low Wee Wern; Malaysia
Women's singles	Nicol David; Malaysia	Annie Au; Hong Kong	Joey Chan; Hong Kong
Women's team	Malaysia; Delia Arnold; Nicol David; Low Wee Wern; Sharon Wee	Hong Kong; Annie Au; Joey Chan; Rebecca Chiu; Liu Tsz Ling	India; Anaka Alankamony; Joshna Chinappa; Dipika Pallikal; Anwesha Reddy
Women's team	Malaysia; Delia Arnold; Nicol David; Low Wee Wern; Sharon Wee	Hong Kong; Annie Au; Joey Chan; Rebecca Chiu; Liu Tsz Ling	South Korea; Kim Ga-hye; Kim Jin-hee; Park Eun-ok; Song Sun-mi

== Medal table ==
Rank	Nation	Gold	Silver	Bronze	Total
1	Malaysia (MAS)	3	1	2	6
2	Pakistan (PAK)	1	1	0	2
3	Hong Kong (HKG)	0	2	2	4
4	India (IND)	0	0	3	3
5	South Korea (KOR)	0	0	1	1
Totals (5 entries)		4	4	8	16

== Participating nations ==
A total of 69 athletes from 13 nations competed in squash at the 2010 Asian Games:

- Athletes from Kuwait (4)
- China (6)
- Hong Kong (8)
- India (8)
- Japan (6)
- Jordan (1)
- Malaysia (8)
- Pakistan (7)
- Philippines (2)
- Qatar (4)
- Saudi Arabia (4)
- South Korea (8)
- Sri Lanka (3)
