= Squash at the 2014 Asian Games =

- Venue: Yeorumul Squash Courts
- Dates: 20–27 September 2014
- Competitors: 69 from 11 nations

Squash at the 2014 Asian Games was held in the Yeorumul Squash Courts, in Incheon, South Korea from September 20 to September 27, 2014.

Competition consists of men's and women's singles and team competitions, Malaysia finished first in medal table.

== Schedule ==
P	Preliminary rounds	¼	Quarterfinals	½	Semifinals	F	Final

Event↓/Date →	20th Sat	21st Sun	22nd Mon	23rd Tue	24th Wed	25th Thu	26th Fri	27th Sat
Men's singles	P	¼	½	F				
Men's team				P	P	P	½	F
Women's singles	P	¼	½	F				
Women's team					P	P	½	F

== Medalists ==
Event	Gold	Silver	Bronze
Men's singles	Abdullah Al-Muzayen; Kuwait	Saurav Ghosal; India	Ong Beng Hee; Malaysia
Men's singles	Abdullah Al-Muzayen; Kuwait	Saurav Ghosal; India	Max Lee; Hong Kong
Men's team	India; Saurav Ghosal; Kush Kumar; Mahesh Mangaonkar; Harinder Pal Sandhu	Malaysia; Mohd Nafiizwan Adnan; Mohd Azlan Iskandar; Ong Beng Hee; Ivan Yuen	Kuwait; Abdullah Al-Muzayen; Ali Al-Ramezi; Ammar Al-Tamimi; Falah Fayez
Men's team	India; Saurav Ghosal; Kush Kumar; Mahesh Mangaonkar; Harinder Pal Sandhu	Malaysia; Mohd Nafiizwan Adnan; Mohd Azlan Iskandar; Ong Beng Hee; Ivan Yuen	Hong Kong; Leo Au; Cheuk Yan Tang; Max Lee; Yip Tsz Fung
Women's singles	Nicol David; Malaysia	Low Wee Wern; Malaysia	Dipika Pallikal; India
Women's singles	Nicol David; Malaysia	Low Wee Wern; Malaysia	Annie Au; Hong Kong
Women's team	Malaysia; Delia Arnold; Nicol David; Low Wee Wern; Vanessa Raj	India; Anaka Alankamony; Aparajitha Balamurukan; Joshna Chinappa; Dipika Pallikal	Hong Kong; Annie Au; Joey Chan; Liu Tsz Ling; Tong Tsz Wing
Women's team	Malaysia; Delia Arnold; Nicol David; Low Wee Wern; Vanessa Raj	India; Anaka Alankamony; Aparajitha Balamurukan; Joshna Chinappa; Dipika Pallikal	South Korea; Lee Ji-hyun; Park Eun-ok; Song Sun-mi; Yang Yeon-soo

== Medal table ==
Rank	Nation	Gold	Silver	Bronze	Total
1	Malaysia (MAS)	2	2	1	5
2	India (IND)	1	2	1	4
3	Kuwait (KUW)	1	0	1	2
4	Hong Kong (HKG)	0	0	4	4
5	South Korea (KOR)	0	0	1	1
Totals (5 entries)		4	4	8	16

== Participating nations ==
A total of 69 athletes from 11 nations competed in squash at the 2014 Asian Games:

- China (8)
- Hong Kong (8)
- India (8)
- Japan (6)
- Jordan (4)
- Kuwait (4)
- Macau (3)
- Malaysia (8)
- Pakistan (8)
- Qatar (4)
- South Korea (8)
