= Otters Club =

Sporting club in Mumbai, India

Otters Club logo

Otters Club, established as a sporting institution in 1973, is one of the premier clubs in the city of Mumbai, India. Located near the Jogger's Park on Carter Road, Bandra, it is a members-only club that participates in a variety of sports, most notably swimming and squash.

The club has many Indian celebrities as its members, including Gauri Khan, Salman Khan, Sameera Reddy, Raveena Tandon, Sharman Joshi, Ranveer Singh and Ritesh Sidhwani. Its first president was veteran Indian actor Dilip Kumar.

The club's Swimming and Squash Departments have produced many athletes who have represented India at an international level. The club continues to train people in the area of sports. A number of sports meetings are held in its swimming pool and squash courts, as well as its bridge and billiards rooms.

== See also ==
- Bandra
- Pali Hill
