= Harinder Pal Sandhu =

Indian squash player (born 1989)

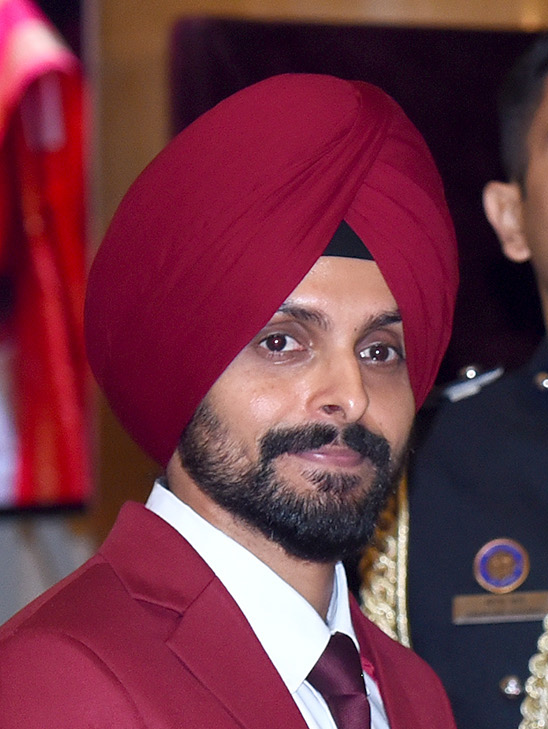
- Sandhu in 2024

Personal information
- Full name: Harinder Pal Singh Sandhu
- Born: 31 March 1989 (age 37) Chandigarh, India
- Height: 1.74 m (5 ft 9 in)
- Weight: 64 kg (141 lb)

Sport
- Country: India
- Handedness: Right Handed
- Coached by: Major Maniam & Cyrus Poncha
- Retired: Active
- Racquet used: Wilson

Men's singles
- Highest ranking: No. 47 (April, 2018)
- Current ranking: No. 115 (March, 2020)
- Title: 8
- Tour final: 14
Medal record
Men's squash
Representing India
World Doubles Championships
Bronze medal – third place	2016 Darwin	Mixed doubles
Asian Games
Gold medal – first place	2014 Incheon	Team
Gold medal – first place	2022 Hangzhou	Team
Gold medal – first place	2022 Hangzhou	Mixed doubles
Bronze medal – third place	2018 Jakarta	Team
Bronze medal – third place	2010 Guangzhou	Team
South Asian Games
Silver medal – second place	2016 Guwahati	Singles
Silver medal – second place	2019 Nepal	Singles
Silver medal – second place	2019 Nepal	Team
- Updated on 13 April 2022

Harinder Pal Sandhu (born 31 March 1989) is an Indian professional squash player. He reached a career-high world ranking of World No. 47 in April 2018.

He was a part of the Indian team, who won the gold medal at the 2014 Asian Games held at Incheon. Harinder Pal Singh Sandhu won the first match (11-8, 11-6, 8-11, 11-4) against Mohd Azlan Iskandar of Malaysia, giving India a 1-0 lead over Malaysia. Saurav Ghosal won the second match, bagging the gold medal for India in the men's team event.

== Awards ==
He was conferred the Arjuna Award for 2023.
