= Vanessa Raj =

Malaysian squash player (born 1996)

Personal information
- Born: 6 January 1996 (age 30) Penang, Malaysia

Sport
- Country: Malaysia
- Handedness: Right Handed
- Turned pro: 2010
- Coached by: Khoo Teng Hin
- Retired: Active
- Racquet used: Dunlop

Women's singles
- Highest ranking: No. 56 (August 2016)
- Current ranking: No. 206 (September 2024)
Medal record
Women's squash
Representing Malaysia
Asian Games
| Gold medal – first place | 2014 Incheon | Team |
- Updated on 1 September 2024

Vanessa Raj (born January 6, 1996, in Penang) is a professional squash player who represents Malaysia. She reached a career-high world ranking of World No. 56 in August 2016.
