= Ivan Yuen =

Malaysian squash player (born 1990)

Personal information
- Full name: Ivan Yuen Chee Wern
- Born: Yuen Chee Wern; 15 September 1990 (age 35) Penang, Malaysia
- Height: 1.79 m (5 ft 10 in)
- Weight: 66 kg (146 lb)

Sport
- Country: Malaysia
- Handedness: Left Handed
- Turned pro: 2007
- Coached by: Ajaz Azmat
- Retired: Active
- Racquet used: Prince

Men's singles
- Highest ranking: No. 40 (March 2017)
- Current ranking: No. 40 (March 2017)
- Title: 1
- Tour final: 4
Medal record
Men's squash
Representing Malaysia
Asian Games
Gold medal – first place	2018 Jakarta-Palembang	Team
Silver medal – second place	2010 Guangzhou	Team
Silver medal – second place	2014 Incheon	Team
Bronze medal – third place	2022 Hangzhou	Team
- Updated on September 2018

Ivan Yuen Chee Wern (born 15 September 1990), known as Ivan Yuen, is a professional squash player from Malaysia. He reached a career-high world ranking of World No. 40 in March 2017.
