= Dick Lau =

Hong Kong squash player (born 1985)

Personal information
- Full name: Dick Lau Siu-wai
- Born: Lau Siu-wai; 20 December 1985 (age 40) Hong Kong
- Height: 1.78 m (5 ft 10 in)
- Weight: 75 kg (165 lb)

Sport
- Country: Hong Kong
- Turned pro: 2004
- Coached by: Tony Choi

Men's singles
- Highest ranking: No. 74 (May 2012)
Medal record
Men's squash
Representing Hong Kong
Asian Games
Bronze medal – third place	2010 Guangzhou	Team
- Updated on April 2013

Dick Lau Siu-wai (劉少維; born 20 December 1985 in Hong Kong) is a professional squash player who represents Hong Kong. He reached a career-high world ranking of World number 74.
