= Navin Samarasinghe =

Sri Lankan squash player (born 1982)

Personal information
- Born: 5 June 1982 (age 44) Colombo
- Height: 158 cm (5 ft 2 in)

Sport
- Country: Sri Lanka
- Handedness: Squash
- Turned pro: 2006
- Racquet used: Wilson
- Highest ranking: 238 (March 2004)

Navin Samarasinghe (born 5 June 1982) is a former Sri Lankan male squash player. He has been a Sri Lankan national squash champion on 8 occasions. (1999, 2000, 2005, 2008, 2009, 2010, 2011, 2012)

Samarasinghe has represented the nation in the 2006 Asian Games and at the 2010 Asian Games.
