= Song Sun-mi =

South Korean squash player (born 1990)

Personal information
- Born: 28 May 1990 (age 36) Kunpo City, South Korea

Sport
- Country: South Korea
- Handedness: Right Handed
- Turned pro: 2005
- Coached by: Ho-Suck Gang
- Retired: Active
- Racquet used: Wilson

Women's singles
- Highest ranking: No. 41 (September, 2010)
- Current ranking: No. 91 (August, 2013)
- Title: 2
- Tour final: 6
Medal record
Women's squash
Representing South Korea
Asian Games
Bronze medal – third place	2010 Guangzhou	Team
Bronze medal – third place	2014 Incheon	Team
- Updated on August, 2013

Song Sun-mi (born 28 May 1990 in Kunpo City) is a professional squash player who represents South Korea. She reached a career-high world ranking of World No. 41 in September 2010.
