= Squash at the 2018 Asian Games =

- Venue: Gelora Bung Karno Squash Stadium
- Dates: 23 August – 1 September 2018
- Competitors: 103 from 18 nations

Squash at the 2018 Asian Games was held at the Gelora Bung Karno Squash Stadium, Jakarta, Indonesia, from 23 August to 1 September 2018.

Nicol David of Malaysia won her fifth gold medal in women's singles event.

== Schedule ==
P	Preliminary rounds	¼	Quarterfinals	½	Semifinals	F	Final

Event↓/Date →	23rd Thu	24th Fri	25th Sat	26th Sun	27th Mon	28th Tue	29th Wed	30th Thu	31st Fri	1st Sat
Men's singles	P	¼	½	F						
Men's team					P	P	P	P	½	F
Women's singles	P	¼	½	F						
Women's team					P	P	P	P	½	F

== Medalists ==
Event	Gold	Silver	Bronze
Men's singles	Leo Au; Hong Kong	Max Lee; Hong Kong	Saurav Ghosal; India
Men's singles	Leo Au; Hong Kong	Max Lee; Hong Kong	Mohd Nafiizwan Adnan; Malaysia
Men's team	Malaysia; Mohd Nafiizwan Adnan; Mohd Syafiq Kamal; Ng Eain Yow; Ivan Yuen	Hong Kong; Leo Au; Max Lee; Henry Leung; Yip Tsz Fung	India; Saurav Ghosal; Mahesh Mangaonkar; Harinder Pal Sandhu; Ramit Tandon
Men's team	Malaysia; Mohd Nafiizwan Adnan; Mohd Syafiq Kamal; Ng Eain Yow; Ivan Yuen	Hong Kong; Leo Au; Max Lee; Henry Leung; Yip Tsz Fung	Pakistan; Israr Ahmed; Tayyab Aslam; Amaad Fareed; Asim Khan
Women's singles	Nicol David; Malaysia	Sivasangari Subramaniam; Malaysia	Dipika Pallikal; India
Women's singles	Nicol David; Malaysia	Sivasangari Subramaniam; Malaysia	Joshna Chinappa; India
Women's team	Hong Kong; Annie Au; Joey Chan; Ho Tze Lok; Lee Ka Yi	India; Joshna Chinappa; Tanvi Khanna; Sunayna Kuruvilla; Dipika Pallikal	Malaysia; Aifa Azman; Nicol David; Low Wee Wern; Sivasangari Subramaniam
Women's team	Hong Kong; Annie Au; Joey Chan; Ho Tze Lok; Lee Ka Yi	India; Joshna Chinappa; Tanvi Khanna; Sunayna Kuruvilla; Dipika Pallikal	Japan; Misaki Kobayashi; Risa Sugimoto; Satomi Watanabe

== Medal table ==
Rank	Nation	Gold	Silver	Bronze	Total
1	Hong Kong (HKG)	2	2	0	4
2	Malaysia (MAS)	2	1	2	5
3	India (IND)	0	1	4	5
4	Japan (JPN)	0	0	1	1
4	Pakistan (PAK)	0	0	1	1
Totals (5 entries)		4	4	8	16

== Participating nations ==
A total of 103 athletes from 18 nations competed in squash at the 2018 Asian Games:

- China (4)
- Hong Kong (8)
- India (8)
- Indonesia (8)
- Iran (5)
- Japan (6)
- Kuwait (1)
- Macau (3)
- Malaysia (8)
- Mongolia (4)
- Nepal (4)
- Pakistan (8)
- Philippines (8)
- Qatar (4)
- Singapore (4)
- South Korea (8)
- Sri Lanka (4)
- Thailand (8)
