= Misaki Kobayashi =

Japanese squash player (born 1990)

Personal information
- Born: January 16, 1990 (age 36) Tokyo, Japan

Sport
- Country: Japan
- Handedness: Right Handed
- Turned pro: 2005
- Coached by: Khoo Teng Hin & Yoshihiro Watanabe
- Retired: Active
- Racquet used: Head, Prince

Women's singles
- Highest ranking: No. 29 (January 2014)
- Current ranking: No. 38 (November, 2016)
- Title: 4
- Tour final: 5
Medal record
Women's squash
Representing Japan
Asian Games
Bronze medal – third place	2018 Jakarta	Team
- Updated on November 2016

Misaki Kobayashi (小林海咲, Kobayashi Misaki; born 16 January 1990 in Tokyo) is a professional squash player who represents Japan. She reached a career-high world ranking of World No. 29 in January 2014.
