= Yasir Butt =

Pakistani squash player (born 1988)

Personal information
- Full name: Yasir Ali Butt
- Nickname: Yas
- Born: 3 July 1988 (age 38) Lahore, Pakistan
- Height: 183 cm (6 ft 0 in)
- Weight: 155 lb (70 kg)

Sport
- Country: Pakistan
- Handedness: Right Handed
- Turned pro: 2003
- Racquet used: Harrow

Men's singles
- Highest ranking: No. 40 (July 2008)
- Current ranking: No. 503 (December 2017)
Medal record
Men's squash
Representing Pakistan
Asian Games
Gold medal – first place	2010 Guangzhou	Team
Asian Championships
Gold medal – first place	2012 Kuwait City	Team
Gold medal – first place	2010 Chennai	Team
Bronze medal – third place	2008 Kuwait City	Team

Yasir Ali Butt (born 3 July 1988 in Lahore, Pakistan) is a professional squash player who has represented Pakistan internationally. He reached a Professional Squash Association (PSA) ranking of World No. 40 in July 2008 and Super Series ranking No. 17 in 2012.

Butt represented Pakistan at both the 2010 Commonwealth Games in New Delhi, India and the 2010 Asian Games in Guangzhou, China, and was part of the gold medal-winning team at the latter event.

== Accomplishments ==
- Career's best Professional Squash Association (PSA) ranking 40 and super series ranking 17
- Finalist of World Junior Open Squash Championship 2004 singles event
- Winner of World Junior Open Squash Championship 2004 team event
- Finalist of Asian Junior Open Squash Championship 2003 singles event
- Winner of Asian Junior Open Squash Championship 2003 team event
- Winner of British Junior Open Squash Championship 2003 U-17 category
- Winner of British Junior Open Squash Championship 2002 U-15 category
- Winner of Scottish Junior Open Squash Championship 2002 U-15 category
- Winner of National Junior Championships of U-14, U-15, U-16, U-17 & U-19 categories.
- Represented Pakistan in World Squash Team Championship, World Open, British Open, Malaysian
- Open, Hong Kong Open, Asian and Commonwealth Games
- Semi Final of Florida State Open 2011 (USA)
- Winner of Gold Racquet Tournament 2011 (USA)
- Finalist of Dayton Open 2011 (USA)
- Winner of FMC International Squash Championship 2011 (Pakistan)
- Finalist 3RD Kish Persian Gulf Cup 2011 (Iran)
- Finalist Pakistan International Squash Championship 2011 (Pakistan)
- Finalist Taiwan Open 2008 (Taiwan)
- Finalist President International Squash Championship 2008 (Pakistan)
- Finalist COAS International Squash Championship 2008 (Pakistan)
- Finalist Fajr International Squash Championship 2008 (Pakistan)
- Semifinalist of Manitoba Open 2008 Canada
- Gold medallist in Asian Games 2010, Guangzhou, China
- Gold medallist in SAF Games 2006 held at Colombo, Sri Lanka
- Gold medallist in National Team Championship 2006 held at Islamabad, Pakistan
