= Danish Atlas Khan =

Pakistani squash player

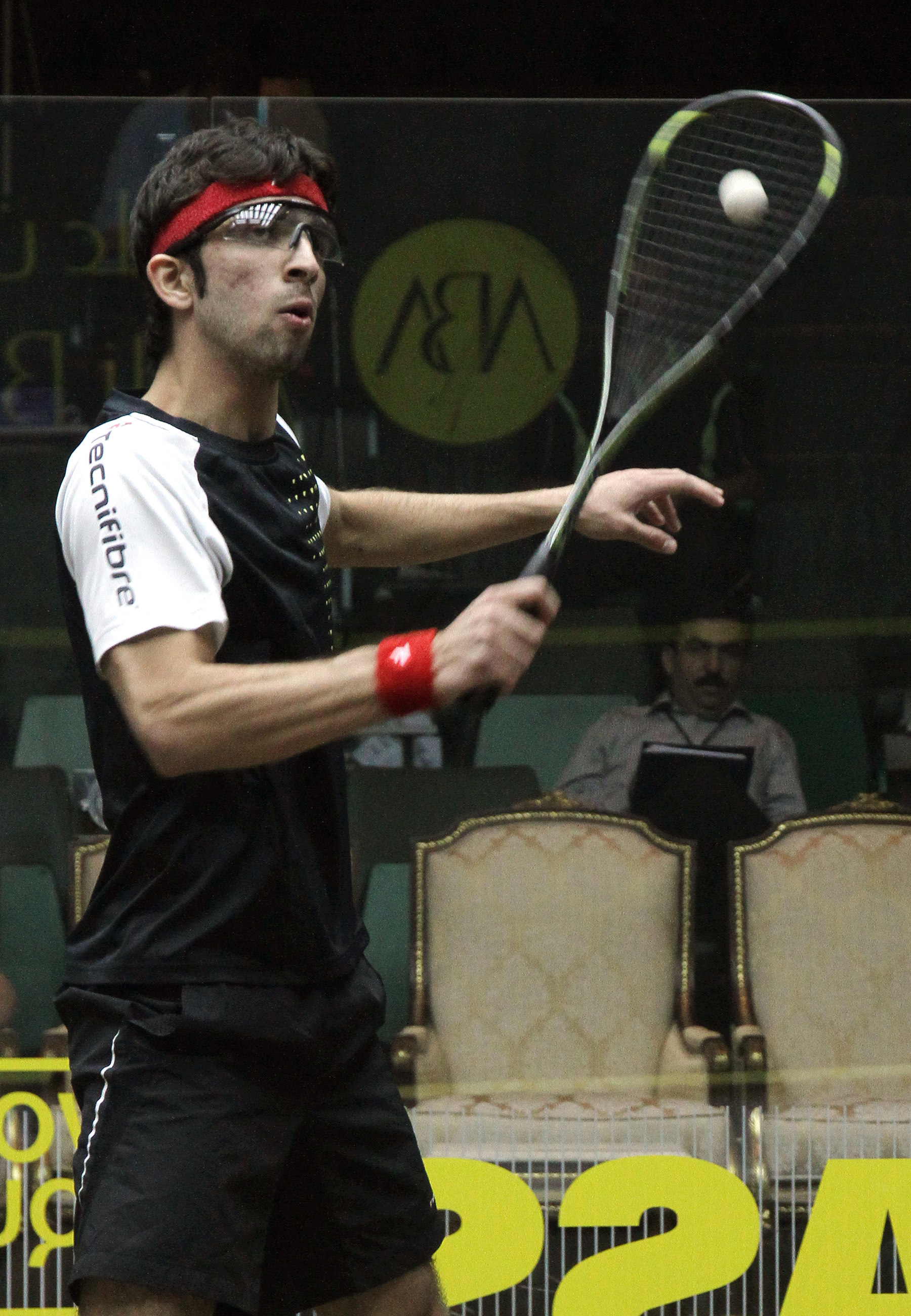
- Khan at the World Junior Squash Championships in Doha, 2012

Personal information
- Born: 2 January 1994 (age 32) Peshawar, Pakistan
- Height: 1.72 m (5 ft 8 in)
- Weight: 72 kg (159 lb)

Sport
- Country: Pakistan
- Turned pro: 2008
- Coached by: Atlas Khan
- Racquet used: Tecnifibre

Men's singles
- Highest ranking: (U-19 World # 3)
- Title: 35 Gold Medals 20 Silver Medals 16 Bronze Medals
- World Open: Silver Medalist in World Junior Team Championship 2010
Medal record
Men's squash
Representing Pakistan
Asian Games
Gold medal – first place	2010 Guangzhou	Team
Asian Championships
Gold medal – first place	2016 New Taipei City	Team
Gold medal – first place	2010 Chennai	Team
South Asian Games
Silver medal – second place	2016 Guwahati	Team

Danish Atlas Khan (born 2 January 1994, in Peshawar) is a professional squash player from Pakistan. He is the recipient of one of Pakistan's highest civil award, the Tamgha-e-Imtiaz (Medal of Excellence). During his squash career, he has won an overall 71 medals for Pakistan, including 35 gold, 20 silver, and 16 bronze medals. He is the nephew of former World Squash Champion Jansher Khan.

== Family ==
Danish Atlas Khan belongs to a distinguished Pakistani squash family whose legacy spans approximately six decades. He is the son of former World Team Squash Champion Atlas Khan, who also serves as his coach, and the nephew of eight time World Squash Champion legendary Jansher Khan. The family is credited with winning 15 World Championship titles for Pakistan and has made significant contributions to the country’s international sporting reputation, inspiring generations of squash players and carrying Pakistan’s name to sporting arenas around the world..

== Career ==
Danish Atlas Khan is Asian Games Gold Medalist in the team event in Guangzhou, China 2010.

He is the youngest ever Asian Games Gold Medalist athlete, at the age of 16, where Pakistan won a squash Gold Medal in Asian Games after a gap of 12 years.

He was a bronze medalist in World Junior Championship in 2012 and achieved his career-high ranking of World # 3.

He also won the silver medal at the 2010 World Junior Team Championship, where he was the Pakistan national team's captain.

Danish Atlas Khan is 5-time Asian Squash Champion, he also won the silver medal in the 2016 South Asian Games.

He is two-times Asian Junior Individual Champion (2011 & 2012) and became the #1 junior squash player in Asia.

Khan has been a 14-time national gold medalist.

Atlas Khan is former Pakistan #1 Senior squash player, he started playing squash aged six, he has served Pakistan squash, he represented Pakistan in 20 countries USA, England, Canada, Switzerland, France, China, etc. During his career he has won many national and international medals including 35 Gold Medals, 20 Silver Medals, 16 Bronze Medals with a total medals of 71 for Pakistan.

He represented Pakistan in the following prestigious events, • Commonwealth Games 2010, • Asian Games 2010 & 2014, • South Asian Games 2016

Medals List • Asian Games Gold Medalist 2010 in China, Team Event • Chicago Open Champion 2015 in USA • Gold Medalist in Asian Senior Team Championship in Hong Kong 2014 • Twice Asian Junior Champion Individual 2011 in Jordan & 2012 in Iran • Silver Medalist in South Asian Games Team Event in India in 2016 • Silver Medalist in World Junior Championship Team Event in Ecuador in 2010 • Silver Medalist in Asian Junior Team Event 2011 in Sri Lanka • Silver Medalist in U-17 British Junior Open squash Championship 2009 in England • Bronze Medalist in World Junior Individual Championship in Qatar in 2012

During his PSA career Danish Atlas Khan has played 16 (PSA) Professional Squash Association Finals where he won 8 PSA finals, he won his first 3 PSA consecutive tournaments in Iran and did hat trick in 2011.

Government of Pakistan awarded a Certificate of Recognition to Mr. Danish Atlas Khan for Projecting the image of the country by winning International Gold Medals for Pakistan in 2005, he is also Awarded Outstanding Best Man Player of the Year award in Asia by Asian Squash Federation in 2012.

== Awards & Recognitions ==
Tamgha-e-Imtiaz (Medals of Excellence) by President of Pakistan in 2024

Certificate of Recognition by Prime Minister of Pakistan in 2005

Asian Junior Man Player of the Year award by Asian Squash Federation in 2012

== Rankings ==
Pakistan Highest Rank #1 Senior

Pakistan Highest Rank #1 in Junior

Asian Highest Rank #1 in Junior

World Highest Rank #3 in Junior

=== (PSA) Professional Squash Association ===
Highest Rank #65. (May 2015):
