= Leo Au =

Hong Kong squash player (born 1990)

Leo Au MH
Personal information
- Full name: Au Chun Ming
- Born: February 1, 1990 (age 36) Hong Kong
- Height: 1.65 m (5 ft 5 in)
- Weight: 65 kg (143 lb)

Sport
- Country: Hong Kong
- Turned pro: 2010
- Coached by: Abdul Faheem Khan
- Retired: 2020
- Racquet used: Prince

Men's singles
- Highest ranking: No. 20 (July 2018)
- Title: 11
- Tour final: 20
Medal record
Men's squash
Representing Hong Kong
World Team Championships
Bronze medal – third place	2017 Marseille	Team
Asian Games
Silver medal – second place	2018 Jakarta	Team
Bronze medal – third place	2010 Guangzhou	Team
Bronze medal – third place	2014 Incheon	Team
Gold medal – first place	2018 Jakarta	Singles
East Asian Games
Gold medal – first place	2009 Hong Kong	Mixed doubles
Gold medal – first place	2009 Hong Kong	Team
Bronze medal – third place	2013 Tianjin	Singles
Asian Individual Championships
Gold medal – first place	2015 Kuwait City	Singles
Silver medal – second place	2019 Kuala Lumpur	Singles

Leo Au MH (born Au Chun Ming; February 1, 1990 in Hong Kong) is a retired professional squash player who represented Hong Kong. He reached a career-high world ranking of World No. 20 in July 2018.

Leo Au was coached by Abdul Faheem Khan.

On 5 May 2015, fourth seed Leo Au stunned the home crowd by outplaying Incheon Asian Games gold medallist Abdullah Al-Muzayen in three games (11–7, 11–9, 13–11) to win the 2015 Men's Asian Individual Squash Championships at Kuwait City. Leo Au retired from professional squash in June 2020.
