= Mohd Nafiizwan Adnan =

Malaysian squash player (born 1986)

Nafiizwan Adnan
Personal information
- Full name: Mohamad Nafiizwan bin Mohamad Adnan
- Nickname: Wan a.k.a. The Komodo (Biawak Nakal)
- Born: 24 April 1986 (age 40) Kuala Terengganu, Terengganu, Malaysia
- Years active: 1998-2019
- Height: 1.79 m (5 ft 10 in)

Sport
- Country: Malaysia
- Turned pro: 2004
- Coached by: Peter Genever
- Retired: 2019
- Racquet used: Head

Men's Singles
- Highest ranking: No. 26 (May 2017)
- Current ranking: No. 35 (April 2018)
- Title: 6
- Tour final: 16
Medal record
Men's squash
Representing Malaysia
Commonwealth Games
Bronze medal – third place	2018 Gold Coast	Singles
Asian Games
Gold medal – first place	2018 Jakarta-Palembang	Team
Silver medal – second place	2010 Guangzhou	Team
Silver medal – second place	2014 Incheon	Team
Bronze medal – third place	2018 Jakarta-Palembang	Singles
- Updated on September 2018

Mohamad Nafiizwan bin Mohamad Adnan (born 24 April 1986 in Kuala Terengganu, Terengganu), known as Nafiizwan Adnan and nicknamed The Komodo, is a professional squash player who has represented Malaysia. He reached a career-high world ranking of World No. 26 in May 2017.

He became the first ever Malaysian male squash player to claim a medal in the men's singles event at the Commonwealth Games after clinching the historical bronze medal for Malaysia in the men's singles event during the 2018 Commonwealth Games.
