= Mohammad Al-Saraj =

Jordanian squash player (born 1998)

Mohammad Al Sarraj
Personal information
- Born: November 6, 1998 (age 27) Amman, Jordan
- Height: 182
- Weight: 76

Sport
- Country: Jordan
- Handedness: RightHanded
- Turned pro: 2016
- Coached by: Abdel Raoof Hijazi, Ikramallah Khan
- Retired: Retired
- Racquet used: Tecnifibre

Men's singles
- Highest ranking: No. 82 (November 2017)
- Current ranking: No. 92 (February 2018)
- Updated on February, 2018

Mohammad Al Sarraj, also known as Mohammad Alsarraj (born 6 November 1998 in Amman) is a Jordanian professional squash player. As of February 2018, he was ranked number 92 in the world.
