= Ong Beng Hee =

Malaysian squash player

Personal information
- Full name: Ong Beng Hee
- Born: 4 February 1980 (age 46) Penang, Malaysia
- Height: 1.78 m (5 ft 10 in)
- Weight: 72 kg (159 lb)

Sport
- Country: Malaysia
- Handedness: Right Handed
- Turned pro: 1995
- Coached by: Jamshed Gul
- Retired: 2015
- Racquet used: Dunlop

Men's singles
- Highest ranking: No. 7 (December, 2001)
- Title: 15
- Tour final: 24
Medal record
Men's squash
Representing Malaysia
Commonwealth Games
Silver medal – second place	2002 Manchester	Mixed doubles
Bronze medal – third place	2010 Delhi	Mixed doubles
Asian Games
Gold medal – first place	2002 Busan	Singles
Gold medal – first place	2006 Doha	Singles
Silver medal – second place	2010 Guangzhou	Team
Silver medal – second place	2014 Incheon	Team
Bronze medal – third place	2010 Guangzhou	Singles
Bronze medal – third place	2014 Incheon	Singles
- Updated on January 2015

Ong Beng Hee (Chinese: 王平喜; pinyin: Wáng Píngxǐ; Pe̍h-ōe-jī: Ông Bêng-hí; born 4 February 1980) is a Malaysian former professional squash player and coach. Between 2000 and 2006, he won four consecutive Asian Championship titles. In 2002 and 2006 he won gold medals at the Asian Games. He won 11 Professional Squash Association (PSA) Tour titles out of 19 final appearances, and earned a world ranking of No. 7, a career-best. This record has made him Malaysia's most successful male squash player in history.

He retired in July 2015.

== Biography ==
=== 1994–1997 ===
Ong Beng Hee began playing squash when he was eight – at the 17-court club his squash-enthusiast father had built in Malaysia. He first came to international attention in January 1994 when he won the British Junior Under-14 Open title in England. A year later he reached the final of the Under-16 British Open, eventually winning the Under-16 title in January 1996. Later that year, he reached the semi-finals of the 1996 World Junior Open in Egypt, competing as a 16-year-old in an event where most fellow competitors were at least two years older. Coached initially by his father, then the Canadian Malaysian national coach Jamie Hickox, Beng Hee moved to England in 1997 to work with Neil Harvey, coach to England's long-time world No 1 Peter Nicol – later moving north to work with Malcolm Willstrop.

=== 1998–2001 ===
In January 1998, he became the British Junior Under-19 Open champion, at the age of 17, and joined a select group of squash players who have claimed three British Junior Open titles. In August 1998, Beng Hee clinched the World Junior Open title in his second successive final, beating Egypt’s Wael El Hindi in the final in Princeton, New Jersey, United States. He won the Milo Open in 1999 and 2000. He began the new millennium outside the top 40 but, by the end of the year, he had won his first Asian Championship, had become the first Malaysian to qualify for the British Open, and had gone on to make the quarter-finals. He had also secured three PSA titles, the Mega Italia Open and the Milo Open in April 2000 and, the third of these was in Kuala Lumpur where he became the first home winner of the prestigious Malaysian Open. His year ended with a spot in the top ten, and a career-best world number 7 ranking in December 2001. In 2001, Beng Hee reached the quarter-finals of five Super Series events and was the winner of the Macau Open.

=== 2002–2007 ===
In 2002, Beng Hee made up for the disappointment of a third-round exit in the men’s singles of the Commonwealth Games in England by winning the silver medal in the Mixed Doubles with Nicol David. He won the Swedish Open title in January 2002. and the Asian Championship in May. In 2006, he won the Asian Championships in Doha. 2007's highlights included beating higher-ranked Stewart Boswell to reach the quarter-finals of the British Open in Manchester, then, later in the year, repeating his success over the Australian in the Qatar Classic before achieving a second upset over Egyptian Wael El Hindi to become the only unseeded player to reach the last eight of the Super Series event in Doha.

=== Recent years ===
Beng Hee consolidated his presence in the middle of the top 20 in 2008 with an appearance in the final of the Kolkata International in India in February. But the biggest boost to his confidence came in his home country in March when he reached the final of the Kuala Lumpur Open for the third time – but this time beat his rival, Mohd Azlan Iskandar 11–8, 15–13, 12–10 to win the title for the first time. The win endorsed his rise above Iskandar in the PSA rankings – but later took Beng Hee back into the world top ten for the first time since December 2003. After 10 first round exits in his 14 tournament appearances in 2011, Beng Hee won the 2012 Motor City Open in January defeating Hisham Ashour then World #14. In October 2013, Beng Hee won the Royal Lake Club Open, the PSA World Tour Challenger 15 event, in Kuala Lumpur. In the 2014 Commonwealth Games in Glasgow, UK, an ailing Beng Hee was defeated by Kelvin Ndhlovu from Zambia. In June 2015, he became a coach with the Squash Racquets Association of Malaysia. In 2022, he was named as the head coach for the US national squash programme.

=== Retirement ===
In July 2015, Beng Hee announced his retirement from competition on the PSA World Tour.

== Personal life ==
Beng Hee and his wife Winnie have two daughters – Janelle, born in 2014 and Joelle born in 2016.
