= Aamir Atlas Khan =

Pakistani squash player (born 1990)

Aamir Atlas Khan TI
Personal information
- Born: 30 July 1990 (age 36) Peshawar, Pakistan
- Height: 1.72 m (5 ft 8 in)
- Weight: 71 kg (157 lb)

Sport
- Country: Pakistan
- Turned pro: 2002
- Coached by: Atlas Khan
- Retired: 2023
- Racquet used: Tecnifibre

Men's singles
- Highest ranking: 14 (2009)
- Title: 8
- Tour final: 14
Medal record
Men's squash
Representing Pakistan
Asian Games
Gold medal – first place	2010 Guangzhou	Team
Silver medal – second place	2010 Guangzhou	Singles
Asian Championships
Gold medal – first place	2013 Islamabad	Singles
Gold medal – first place	2010 Chennai	Team
Silver medal – second place	2006 Taipei	Team
Bronze medal – third place	2008 Kuwait City	Team
Asian Junior Championships
Gold medal – first place	2005 Chennai	Singles

Aamir Atlas Khan (born 30 July 1990) is a Pakistani professional squash player. He is a recipient of Pakistan's prestigious civil award, the Tamgha-e-Imtiaz. He is the nephew of former world champion Jansher Khan.

== Career ==
Aamir Atlas Khan began playing squash at the age of six and quickly rose through the junior ranks, winning medals in all junior categories, including the British Junior Champion titles in U-13, U-15, U-17, and U-19 categories. He won a silver medal in the individual event and a gold medal in the team event at the 2008 World Junior Championship, and was also the Asian Junior Champion in 2005. In his senior career, he achieved a career-high world ranking of No. 14 and won eight PSA Tour titles, including the Pakistan Open in 2008 and the CAS International. Khan secured gold medals at the 2006 South Asian Games, the 2010 Asian Games, and the 2010 South Asian Games, and became the first Pakistani in 14 years to claim the Asian Senior Individual Squash Champion title in 2013. He also recorded notable victories over top-10 world-ranked players, including Gregory Gaultier at the 2009 Qatar Classic. In recognition of his outstanding achievements in squash, the Government of Pakistan conferred upon him the Tamgha-e-Imtiaz (Medal of Excellence) in 2015.
