= Kush Kumar =

Indian squash player (born 1996)

Personal information
- Born: May 29, 1996 (age 30) Dhampur, India
- Education: Trinity
- Height: 5'11

Sport
- Country: India
- Turned pro: 2013
- Coached by: Major S Maniam; Cyrus Poncha
- Retired: Active
- Racquet used: Tecnifibre

Men's singles
- Highest ranking: No. 89 (August, 2014)
- Current ranking: No. 89 (August, 2014)
- Title: 9 times junior national champion
- Updated on August, 2014

Kush Kumar (born May 29, 1996 in Dhampur) is a professional squash player who represents India. Kumar graduated with a finance degree Trinity College. Kumar now works for a hedge fund called Matrix Capital Management based in Boston. He reached a career-high world ranking of World No. 89 in August 2015. He became popular when his Men's Squash Team won Gold Medal in 2014 Asian Games along with Harinder Pal Sandhu, Mahesh Mangaonkar, Saurav Ghosal.

He is the 1st male player from India to have won a medal in the World Junior Championship, with Shaurya Bawa achieving the feat in 2024, and he has been junior national champion 9 times. Trinity Bantams

On February 27, 2018, Kumar's team captured the collegiate squash national title against Harvard, with Kumar winning his match against Harvard's No. 1.

On March 4, 2018, the top-seeded Kumar placed second in the CSA Individual National Championship, falling 3-2 to the fourteenth-seeded David Ryan of Harvard, who had only gained entry to the tournament after the withdrawals of several higher-ranked players. After battling back from 2-0 down (11-4, 11-8) to even the match at 2-2 (7-11, 3-11), Kumar failed to capitalize on two match balls at 10-8, eventually losing 12-10.
