= Yuta Fukui =

Japanese squash player (born 1987)

Personal information
- Born: December 21, 1987 (age 38) Japan
- Height: 1.78 m (5 ft 10 in)
- Weight: 70 kg (150 lb)

Sport
- Country: Japan
- Turned pro: 2007
- Retired: Active
- Racquet used: Tecnifibre

Men's singles
- Highest ranking: No. 146 (October 2013)
- Updated on September 2017

Yuta Fukui (福井 裕太, Fukui Yūta; born December 21, 1987 in Japan) is a professional squash player who represents Japan. He reached a career-high world ranking of World No. 146 in October 2013.
