= Wang Junjie =

Chinese basketball player (born 2005)

Wang Junjie 王俊杰
No. 10 – UMass Minutemen
- Position: Power forward
- Conference: Mid-American Conference

Personal information
- Born: April 3, 2005 (age 21) Xuzhou, Jiangsu, China
- Listed height: 6 ft 9 in (2.06 m)
- Listed weight: 250 lb (113 kg)

Career information
- High school: Hailiang Foreign Language (Zhuji, China)
- College: San Francisco (2023–2026); UMass (2026–present)

Career highlights
- FIBA Asia Cup All-Star Team (2025); CYBL U-15 Champion (2020); CYBL U-15 National Tournament Most Valuable Player (2020)
Medals
Men's basketball
Representing China
Silver medal – second place	2025 Jeddah

Wang Junjie (Chinese: 王俊杰; born April 3, 2005), or Barry Wang, is a Chinese college basketball player for the UMass Minutemen of the Mid-American Conference. He previously played for the San Francisco Dons.

Wang's development pathway differed from that of most Chinese players, as he emerged from the campus basketball system without any experience with the youth academies of professional clubs or state-run sports schools.

== Early life and high school ==
Wang was born on September 8, 2005 in Xuzhou, Jiangsu province. He was introduced to basketball by his father, who was a primary school physical education teacher. His talent was discovered by the basketball head coach at Hailiang Foreign Language School (HFLS), Mao Weilin. Mao then recommended that Wang enroll in HFLS upon graduation from primary school, which Wang did. And in 2020, Wang represented HFLS and won the China Youth Basketball League (CYBL) Champions for the U-15 group. He was also named the National Tournament's Most Valuable Player.

In 2022, Wang enrolled at the NBA Global Academy in Canberra, Australia, becoming the fifth Chinese player to participate in the program. The following February, at the 2023 All-Star Weekend in Salt Lake City, he participated in the Basketball Without Borders camp.

On April 14, 2023, Wang committed to play college basketball for the San Francisco Dons, committing over offers from Georgetown, Oklahoma and Providence.

In May 2023, Wang represented HFLS in the Chinese High School Basketball League (CHBL). He helped the team reach the national tournament semifinals and secure a third-place finish after defeating Guangdong Experimental High School, whose roster was primarily composed of players from the youth system of the Guangdong Southern Tigers. In the third-place game, Wang recorded 27 points and 22 rebounds. It was a notable achievement considering HFLS wasn't known as a high school basketball powerhouse in China.

== College career ==
=== San Francisco Dons ===
As a freshman, Wang played limited minutes, playing in 20 games and averaging 2.8 points and 1.2 rebounds in 7.5 minutes per game.

As a sophomore, following a season-ending injury to Ndewedo Newbury in a 76–66 win over Loyola Chicago on December 12, 2024, Wang was inserted into the starting lineup and started each of the team's following 24 games. Wang finished averaging 6.2 points and 3.3 rebounds while playing 20.1 minutes per game.

As a junior, Wang averaged 8.5 points and 3.0 rebounds while playing 20.3 minutes per game. On January 2, 2026, Wang recorded his first double-double with 12 points and 12 rebounds in a 74–64 win over San Diego. Later, on January 10, 2026, Wang scored a career high 27 points in a 80–60 win over Pepperdine. Against Washington State on January 18, Wang led the team with 15 points in a 85–80 victory. Following the season, Wang announced he would be entering the transfer portal.

=== UMass Minutemen ===
On May 8, 2026, Wang transferred to UMass.

== National team career ==
Chinese media have described Wang as the first Chinese international player in nearly two decades to have been developed entirely through the campus basketball system rather than professional club academies or traditional sports schools.

Wang represented China at the 2023 FIBA Under-19 Basketball World Cup. He led the team with 21 points and 8 rebounds in an 83–74 Loss to Spain.

Following his sophomore season with the Dons, Wang was invited to training camp with the senior national team in April 2025. On July 30, 2025, he was selected to the national team roster for the 2025 FIBA Asia Cup. He was named to the All-Tournament Team after China finished as Runner-ups, their best finish in the Asia Cup since 2015.

== Career statistics ==
Legend
GP	Games played	GS	Games started	MPG	Minutes per game
FG%	Field goal percentage	3P%	3-point field goal percentage	FT%	Free throw percentage
RPG	Rebounds per game	APG	Assists per game	SPG	Steals per game
BPG	Blocks per game	PPG	Points per game	**Bold**	Career high

=== College ===
Year	Team	GP	GS	MPG	FG%	3P%	FT%	RPG	APG	SPG	BPG	PPG
2023–24	San Francisco	20	0	7.5	**.435**	.320	.700	1.2	.4	.2	.2	2.8
2024–25	San Francisco	33	24	20.1	.405	.299	.571	**3.3**	**.6**	.2	.2	6.2
2025–26	San Francisco	33	24	20.3	.426	**.342**	**.753**	3.0	**.8**	**.5**	**.3**	**8.5**
Career		86	48	17.2	.419	.321	.688	2.7	.6	.3	.2	6.3
