= Mohd Azlan Iskandar =

Malaysian squash player (born 1982)

Personal information
- Full name: Mohamad Azlan bin Iskandar
- Born: 1 June 1982 (age 44) Sarawak, Malaysia
- Height: 5 ft 11 in (1.80 m)
- Weight: 76 kg (168 lb)

Sport
- Country: Malaysia
- Handedness: Right Handed
- Turned pro: 2000
- Coached by: Peter Genever
- Retired: 2012
- Racquet used: Head

Men's singles
- Highest ranking: No. 10 (March 2011)
- Title: 13
- Tour final: 24
Medal record
Men's squash
Representing Malaysia
Asian Games
Gold medal – first place	2010 Guangzhou	Singles
Silver medal – second place	2010 Guangzhou	Team
Silver medal – second place	2014 Incheon	Team
Bronze medal – third place	2006 Doha	Singles
World Games
Bronze medal – third place	2009 Kaohsiung	Singles
- Updated on 2 July 2012

Mohamad Azlan bin Iskandar (born 1 June 1982, in Kuching, Sarawak), known as Mohd Azlan Iskandar, is a Malaysian former squash player. He has reached the World No. 10 ranking and won the Kuala Lumpur Open and the Malaysian Open.

== Early life ==
He studied in Sekolah Menengah Subang Jaya for two years, and then moved to Bukit Jalil Sports School. His dad was born in Scotland and his grandmother is Scottish and Celtic while his granddad is Norwegian. On his mother's side, he is half-Indian and half Malay, and is of Hokkien descent.

== Career overview ==
With a career high of 10 in the Professional Squash Association rankings. Azlan is currently ranked 10th in the PSA table.

== Personal life ==
Azlan has 3 children with entrepreneur Ung Yiu Lin. The pair were married in December 2012.
