= Shinnosuke Tsukue =

Japanese squash player (born 1989)

Personal information
- Born: August 2, 1989 (age 36) Kanagawa, Japan
- Height: 1.70 m (5 ft 7 in)
- Weight: 68 kg (150 lb)

Sport
- Country: Japan
- Turned pro: 2009
- Retired: Active
- Racquet used: Head

Men's singles
- Highest ranking: No. 149 (December, 2012)
- Current ranking: No. 209 (June, 2013)
- Updated on June, 2013

Shinnosuke Tsukue (机 伸之介, Tsukue Shinnosuke; born August 2, 1989 in Kanagawa) is a professional squash player who represents Japan. He reached a career-high world ranking of World No. 149 in December 2012.
