= Ammar Al-Tamimi =

Kuwaiti squash player

Personal information
- Born: September 12, 1988 (age 38) Kuwait City
- Height: 1.73 m (5 ft 8 in)
- Weight: 75 kg (165 lb)

Sport
- Country: Kuwait
- Coached by: Imran Khan
- Retired: Active
- Racquet used: Dunlop

Men's singles
- Highest ranking: No. 100 (February, 2012)
- Current ranking: No. 103 (June, 2013)
Medal record
Men's squash
Representing Kuwait
Asian Games
Bronze medal – third place	2014 Incheon	Team
- Updated on June, 2013

Ammar Al-Tamimi (born September 12, 1988) is a professional squash player who represents Kuwait. He reached a career-high world ranking of World No. 100 in February, 2012.
