= Max Lee =

Hong Kong squash player (born 1988)

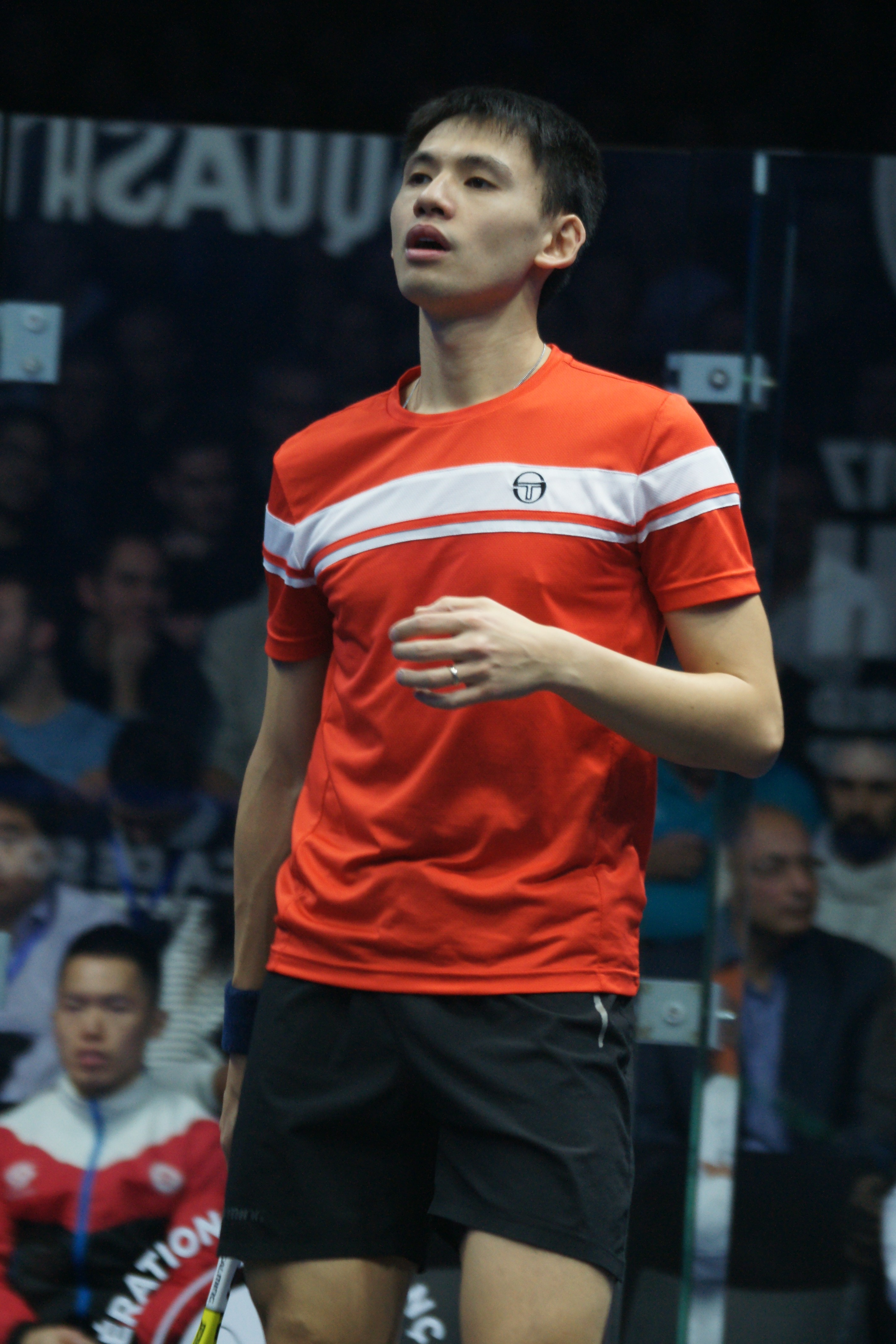
- Lee at the 2017 Men's World Team Squash Championships

Personal information
- Born: January 9, 1988 (age 38) Hong Kong
- Height: 1.76 m (5 ft 9 in)
- Weight: 73 kg (161 lb)

Sport
- Country: Hong Kong
- Turned pro: 2007
- Coached by: Faheem Khan
- Retired: Active
- Racquet used: Tecnifibre

Men's singles
- Highest ranking: No. 12 (December, 2015)
- Current ranking: No. 48 (July, 2020)
- Title: 14
- Tour final: 19
Medal record
Men's squash
Representing Hong Kong
World Team Championships
Bronze medal – third place	2017 Marseille	Team
Asian Games
Bronze medal – third place	2010 Guangzhou	Team
Bronze medal – third place	2014 Incheon	Singles
Bronze medal – third place	2014 Incheon	Team
Silver medal – second place	2018 Jakarta	Singles
Silver medal – second place	2018 Jakarta	Team
Asian Championships
Gold medal – first place	2017 Chennai	Individual
- Updated on July, 2020

Max Lee (born January 9, 1988, in Hong Kong) is a professional squash player who represents Hong Kong. He reached a career-high world ranking of World No. 12 in December 2015. He was coached by Abdul Faheem Khan. Max helped Hong Kong to win the Asian Team Squash Championships against Pakistan in April 2018. He won the Asian Champion in 2017, being the third Hong Kong player to reach this milestone.
