= Abdullah Al-Muzayen =

Kuwaiti squash player (born 1988)

Abdullah Al Muzayen
Personal information
- Born: February 8, 1988 (age 38) Kuwait
- Height: 1.75 m (5 ft 9 in)
- Weight: 70 kg (154 lb)

Sport
- Country: Kuwait
- Handedness: Left Handed
- Coached by: Nasser Zahran
- Retired: Active
- Racquet used: Prince

Men's singles
- Highest ranking: No. 33 (May 2013)
- Title: 20
- Tour final: 23
Medal record
Men's squash
Representing Kuwait
Asian Games
Gold medal – first place	2014 Incheon	Singles
Bronze medal – third place	2014 Incheon	Team

Abdullah Al Muzayen (born 8 February 1988) is a professional squash player who represents Kuwait. He reached a career-high world ranking of world No. 33 in May 2013.

== Career ==
Al Muzayen won the gold medal at the 17th Asian Games at Incheon. He won the PSA world Player of the Month award for February 2018 after achieving the first place in an international tournament in Qatar. His last participation with the Kuwait national team was in November 2022, where the team was placed second in the Asian men's team championship, held in South Korea.

In 2024, Al Muzayen won his 23rd PSA title after securing victory in the QSF No.6 PSA Challenger.
