= Farhan Mehboob =

Pakistani squash player (born 1988)

Personal information
- Born: 23 October 1988 (age 38) Peshawar, Pakistan
- Height: 1.64 m (5 ft 5 in)
- Weight: 60 kg (132 lb)

Sport
- Country: Pakistan
- Handedness: Left Handed
- Turned pro: 2003
- Retired: Active
- Racquet used: Tecnifibre

Men's singles
- Highest ranking: No. 16 (May, 2009)
- Current ranking: No. 66 (January 2017)
- Title: 8
- Tour final: 13
Medal record
Men's squash
Representing Pakistan
Asian Games
Gold medal – first place	2010 Guangzhou	Team
Asian Championships
Gold medal – first place	2016 New Taipei City	Team
Gold medal – first place	2014 Hong Kong	Team
Gold medal – first place	2012 Kuwait City	Team
Gold medal – first place	2010 Chennai	Team
Gold medal – first place	2004 Kuala Lumpur	Team
Bronze medal – third place	2024 Dalian	Team
Bronze medal – third place	2008 Kuwait City	Team
South Asian Games
Gold medal – first place	2019 Nepal	Team
Bronze medal – third place	2019 Nepal	Singles
- Updated on January 2017

Farhan Mehboob (Urdu: فرحان محبوب; born 23 October 1988 in Nawa Kalay, Peshawar) is a professional squash player who represented Pakistan. He reached a career-high PSA ranking of World No. 16 in May 2009.

== Family ==
Mehboob is coached by his father, Mehboob Khan. He is the nephew of Jansher Khan, the former world No. 1 professional Pakistani squash player.

== Career ==
Mehboob was part of the Pakistan's gold medal-winning team at the Asian Games in Guangzhou, China.
