= 2013 Women's Asian Individual Squash Championships =

2013 Asian Individual Squash Championships

Details
- Event name: 2013 Asian Individual Squash Championships
- Location: Islamabad, Pakistan
- Website www.squashsite.co.uk/2009/asianindivs2013.htm

The 2013 Women's Asian Individual Squash Championships is the women's edition of the 2013 Asian Individual Squash Championships, which serves as the individual Asian championship for squash players. The event took place in Islamabad in Pakistan from 1 to 5 May 2013. Annie Au won her first Asian Individual Championships title, defeating Low Wee Wern in the final.

== Seeds ==
1. (Malaysia) Low Wee Wern (Final)
2. (Hong Kong) Annie Au (Champion)
3. (Hong Kong) Joey Chan (Semifinals)
4. (Malaysia) Delia Arnold (Semifinals)
5. (Hong Kong) Liu Tsz-Ling (Quarterfinals)
6. (Pakistan) Maria Toor Pakay (Quarterfinals)
7. (Hong Kong) Tong Tsz-Wing (Quarterfinals)
8. (Malaysia) Zulhijjah Binti Azan (Quarterfinals)

== Draw and results ==
First round
1	(Malaysia) Low Wee Wern
(Pakistan) Sammer Anjum	9	4	11	11
(Sri Lanka) Mihiliya Methsarani	11	11	8	13
(China) Gu Jinyue
6	(Pakistan) Maria Toor Pakay
5	(Hong Kong) Liu Tsz-Ling
(Pakistan) Zoya Khalid
(Pakistan) Saima Shaukat
3	(Hong Kong) Joey Chan
4	(Malaysia) Delia Arnold
(Pakistan) Rushna Mehboob
(China) Xiu Chen	11	11	11
(Sri Lanka) Nad. Gunawardane	7	5	5
7	(Hong Kong) Tong Tsz-Wing
8	(Malaysia) Zulhijjah Binti Azan
(China) Li Dongjin
(Pakistan) Riffat Khan	11	11	11
(Sri Lanka) Dulakshi Elikewela	9	5	8
2	(Hong Kong) Annie Au

Second round
1	(Malaysia) Low Wee Wern	11	11	11
(Sri Lanka) Mihiliya Methsarani	2	4	2
(China) Gu Jinyue	5	4	3
6	(Pakistan) Maria Toor Pakay	11	11	11
5	(Hong Kong) Liu Tsz-Ling	11	11	11
(Pakistan) Zoya Khalid	7	1	9
(Pakistan) Saima Shaukat	4	4	1
3	(Hong Kong) Joey Chan	11	11	11
4	(Malaysia) Delia Arnold	11	11	11
(Pakistan) Rushna Mehboob	0	8	6
(China) Xiu Chen	5	2	3
7	(Hong Kong) Tong Tsz-Wing	11	11	11
8	(Malaysia) Zulhijjah Binti Azan	12	9	11	9	11
(China) Li Dongjin	10	11	8	11	5
(Pakistan) Riffat Khan	5	3	5
2	(Hong Kong) Annie Au	11	11	11

Quarter finals
1	(Malaysia) Low Wee Wern	11	11	11
6	(Pakistan) Maria Toor Pakay	9	7	7
5	(Hong Kong) Liu Tsz-Ling	4	4	3
3	(Hong Kong) Joey Chan	11	11	11
4	(Malaysia) Delia Arnold	11	11	11
7	(Hong Kong) Tong Tsz-Wing	5	4	9
8	(Malaysia) Zulhijjah Binti Azan	6	4	15
2	(Hong Kong) Annie Au	11	11	17

Semi finals
1	(Malaysia) Low Wee Wern	11	4	11	11
3	(Hong Kong) Joey Chan	7	11	4	9
Final
1	(Malaysia) Low Wee Wern	11	8	7	1
2	(Hong Kong) Annie Au	5	11	11	11
4	(Malaysia) Delia Arnold	11	6	10	9
2	(Hong Kong) Annie Au	9	11	12	11

== See also ==
- 2013 Men's Asian Individual Squash Championships
- Asian Individual Squash Championships

Preceded by Malaysia (Penang); 2011	Asian Squash Championships; Pakistan (Islamabad); 2013	Succeeded by Kuwait; 2015
