= 2011 Women's Asian Individual Squash Championships =

2011 Asian Individual Squash Championships

Details
- Event name: 2011 Asian Individual Squash Championships
- Location: Malaysia, Penang
- Website www.squashsite.co.uk/2009/asianindividuals2011.htm

The 2011 Women's Asian Individual Squash Championships is the women's edition of the 2011 Asian Individual Squash Championships, which serves as the individual Asian championship for squash players. The event took place in Penang in Malaysia from 26 to 30 April 2011. Nicol David won her eighth Asian Individual Championships title, defeating Annie Au in the final.

== Seeds ==
1. [1*] (Malaysia) Nicol David (champion)
2. [2*] (Hong Kong) Annie Au (final)
3. [3/4*] (Malaysia) Low Wee Wern (semifinals)
4. [3/4*] (Malaysia) Delia Arnold (semifinals)
5. [5/8*] (India) Dipika Pallikal (quarterfinals)
6. [5/8*] (Hong Kong) Joey Chan (quarterfinals)
7. [5/8*] (India) Joshna Chinappa (first round)
8. [5/8*] (South Korea) Sun Mi Song (quarterfinals)

== Draw and results ==
First round
1	(Malaysia) Nicol David
(Singapore) Jerryca Teo	11	11	11
(Sri Lanka) Dulakshi Elikewela	6	5	0
(Singapore) Mao Shi Hui	4	4	6
(South Korea) Eun Tschan Ahn	11	11	11
(Malaysia) Tan Yan Xin	7	3	7
5/8	(Hong Kong) Joey Chan	11	11	11
5/8	(India) Dipika Pallikal	11	11	11
(China) Li Dongjin	7	9	1
(Indonesia) Janet Intan Winona	2	1	7
(Japan) Misaki Kobayashi	11	11	11
(South Korea) Ga Hye Kim	11	11	11
(Indonesia) Irma Maryani	6	3	1
(Japan) Miwa Maekawa	6	6	8
3/4	(Malaysia) Delia Arnold	11	11	11
3/4	(Malaysia) Low Wee Wern	11	11	11
(Japan) Chinatsu Matsui	7	5	3
(China) Gu Jinyue	5	11	9
(Malaysia) Zulhijjah Binti Azan	11	13	11
(Philippines) Ayssa Dalida	4	3	4
(Malaysia) Siti Munirah Jusoh	11	11	11
(Hong Kong) Liu Tsz-Ling	8	11	11	11
5/8	(India) Joshna Chinappa	11	7	9	9
5/8	(South Korea) Sun Mi Song	11	6	11	11
(Hong Kong) Carmen Lee	9	11	7	9
(Japan) Kozue Onizawa	11	11	11
(Malaysia) Celine Yeap	3	6	7
(Malaysia) Vanessa Raj	4	9	8
(South Korea) Yeon Soo Yang	11	11	11
(Philippines) Jemyca Aribado	2	7	2
2	(Hong Kong) Annie Au	11	11	11

Second round
1	(Malaysia) Nicol David	11	11	11
(Singapore) Jerryca Teo	2	6	4
(South Korea) Eun Tschan Ahn	4	11	7	1
5/8	(Hong Kong) Joey Chan	11	6	11	11
5/8	(India) Dipika Pallikal	13	9	11	6	11
(Japan) Misaki Kobayashi	11	11	7	11	3
(South Korea) Ga Hye Kim	5	6	9
3/4	(Malaysia) Delia Arnold	11	11	11
3/4	(Malaysia) Low Wee Wern	11	11	11
(Malaysia) Zulhijjah Binti Azan	4	7	6
(Malaysia) Siti Munirah Jusoh	11	11	10	12
(Hong Kong) Liu Tsz-Ling	5	7	12	10
5/8	(South Korea) Sun Mi Song	6	11	11	11
(Japan) Kozue Onizawa	11	6	4	4
(South Korea) Yeon Soo Yang	8	4	5
2	(Hong Kong) Annie Au	11	11	11

Quarter finals
1	(Malaysia) Nicol David	11	11	11
5/8	(Hong Kong) Joey Chan	6	6	7
5/8	(India) Dipika Pallikal	11	7	11	5	9
3/4	(Malaysia) Delia Arnold	9	11	5	11	11
3/4	(Malaysia) Low Wee Wern	11	10	11	11
(Malaysia) Siti Munirah Jusoh	8	12	8	2
5/8	(South Korea) Sun Mi Song	3	6	8
2	(Hong Kong) Annie Au	11	11	11

Semi finals
1	(Malaysia) Nicol David	11	11	11
3/4	(Malaysia) Delia Arnold	7	4	6
Final
1	(Malaysia) Nicol David	11	11	11
2	(Hong Kong) Annie Au	3	2	5
3/4	(Malaysia) Low Wee Wern	10	12	11	10
2	(Hong Kong) Annie Au	12	10	13	12

== See also ==
- 2011 Men's Asian Individual Squash Championships
- Asian Individual Squash Championships

Preceded by India (Chennai); 2010	Asian Squash Championships; Malaysia (Penang); 2011	Succeeded by Pakistan (Islamabad); 2013
