= 2015 Women's Asian Individual Squash Championships =

Asian Individual Squash Championship

2015 Asian Individual Squash Championships

Details
- Event name: 2015 Asian Individual Squash Championships
- Location: Kuwait
- Website www.squashsite.co.uk/2009/asianchamps2015.htm

The 2015 Women's Asian Individual Squash Championships is the women's edition of the 2015 Asian Individual Squash Championships, which serves as the individual Asian championship for squash players. The event took place in Kuwait from 1 to 5 May 2015. Nicol David won her ninth Asian Individual Championships title, defeating Annie Au in the final.

== Seeds ==
1. (Malaysia) Nicol David (Champion)
2. (India) Dipika Pallikal (Quarterfinals)
3. (Hong Kong) Annie Au (Final)
4. (India) Joshna Chinappa (Semifinals)
5. (Hong Kong) Joey Chan (Quarterfinals)
6. (Malaysia) Delia Arnold (Semifinals)
7. (Hong Kong) Liu Tsz-Ling (Quarterfinals)
8. (Malaysia) Rachel Arnold (Quarterfinals)

== Draw and results ==
First round
1	(Malaysia) Nicol David
(Sri Lanka) Gayara Jayasuriya	2	3	2
10	(Hong Kong) Vanessa Chu	11	11	11
14	(Sri Lanka) Mihiliya Methsarani	11	11	11
(South Korea) Eum Hwa-Yeong	7	10	8
7	(Hong Kong) Liu Tsz-Ling
5	(Hong Kong) Joey Chan
(Sri Lanka) Wasundara Suwaris	3	3	5
12	(Hong Kong) Gu Jin Yue	11	11	11
11	(China) Li Dongjin	11	11	11
(South Korea) Park Eun-Ok	6	6	5
4	(India) Joshna Chinappa
3	(Hong Kong) Annie Au
(Macau) Ivy Liu	3	5	1
15	(Iran) Sogol Samoodi	11	11	11
16	(South Korea) Lee Ji-Hyun	11	11	11
(Iran) Taba Tagh. Rafsanjani	4	4	1
8	(Malaysia) Rachel Arnold
6	(Malaysia) Delia Arnold
(Sri Lanka) Fathoum Issadeen	6	7	4
13	(South Korea) Yang Yeon-Soo	11	11	11
9	(Malaysia) Vanessa Raj
2	(India) Dipika Pallikal

Second round
1	(Malaysia) Nicol David	11	11	11
10	(Hong Kong) Vanessa Chu	3	1	4
14	(Sri Lanka) Mihiliya Methsarani	4	3	5
7	(Hong Kong) Liu Tsz-Ling	11	11	11
5	(Hong Kong) Joey Chan	11	11	11
12	(Hong Kong) Gu Jin Yue	5	6	5
11	(China) Li Dongjin	12	7	4	4
4	(India) Joshna Chinappa	10	11	11	11
3	(Hong Kong) Annie Au	11	11	11
15	(Iran) Sogol Samoodi	1	3	5
16	(South Korea) Lee Ji-Hyun	11	10	10	4
8	(Malaysia) Rachel Arnold	3	12	12	11
6	(Malaysia) Delia Arnold	11	9	11	11
13	(South Korea) Yang Yeon-Soo	5	11	5	8
9	(Malaysia) Vanessa Raj	6	5	4
2	(India) Dipika Pallikal	11	11	11

Quarter finals
1	(Malaysia) Nicol David	11	11	11
7	(Hong Kong) Liu Tsz-Ling	6	3	7
5	(Hong Kong) Joey Chan	8	13	11	9	7
4	(India) Joshna Chinappa	11	11	9	11	11
3	(Hong Kong) Annie Au	11	11	11
8	(Malaysia) Rachel Arnold	5	5	7
6	(Malaysia) Delia Arnold	11	12	11	11	11
2	(India) Dipika Pallikal	7	14	13	8	9

Semi finals
1	(Malaysia) Nicol David	11	11	11
4	(India) Joshna Chinappa	6	9	7
Final
1	(Malaysia) Nicol David	12	11	11
3	(Hong Kong) Annie Au	10	7	8
3	(Hong Kong) Annie Au	7	11	9	12	11
6	(Malaysia) Delia Arnold	11	9	11	10	4

== See also ==
- 2015 Men's Asian Individual Squash Championships
- Asian Individual Squash Championships

Preceded by Pakistan (Islamabad); 2013	Asian Squash Championships; Kuwait; 2015	Succeeded by Asian Championships; 2017
