= Squash at the 2014 Asian Games – Women's team =

Women's team at the 2014 Asian Games
- Venue: Yeorumul Squash Courts
- Dates: 24–27 September 2014
- Competitors: 27 from 7 nations

Medalists
gold medal	Malaysia; Delia Arnold, Nicol David, Low Wee Wern, Vanessa Raj
silver medal	India; Anaka Alankamony, Aparajitha Balamurukan, Joshna Chinappa, Dipika Pallikal
bronze medal	Hong Kong; Annie Au, Joey Chan, Liu Tsz Ling, Tong Tsz Wing
bronze medal	South Korea; Lee Ji-hyun, Park Eun-ok, Song Sun-mi, Yang Yeon-soo

The women's team Squash event was part of the squash programme at the 2014 Asian Games, and took place between September 24 and 27, at the Yeorumul Squash Courts.

== Schedule ==
All times are Korea Standard Time (UTC+09:00)

Date	Time	Event
Wednesday, 24 September 2014	10:00	Group play stage
Thursday, 25 September 2014	14:00	Group play stage
Friday, 26 September 2014	11:00	Semifinals
Saturday, 27 September 2014	14:00	Gold medal match

== Results ==
=== Group play stage ===
==== Pool A ====
Pos	Team	Pld	W	L	MF	MA	Pts	Qualification
1	Malaysia	2	2	0	6	0	2	Semifinals
2	South Korea	2	1	1	2	4	1	Semifinals
3	Japan	2	0	2	1	5	0	

Source: ASF

24 September	Malaysia	3–0	Japan

Nicol David	3–0	Misaki Kobayashi	11–5, 11–3, 11–9
Delia Arnold	3–2	Chinatsu Matsui	11–2, 9–11, 11–3, 7–11, 11–7
Vanessa Raj	3–0	Satomi Watanabe	11–6, 11–9, 11–2

24 September	Japan	1–2	South Korea

Misaki Kobayashi	3–1	Song Sun-mi	11–6, 8–11, 12–10, 11–4
Chinatsu Matsui	1–3	Park Eun-ok	11–9, 9–11, 2–11, 7–11
Satomi Watanabe	1–3	Yang Yeon-soo	16–14, 9–11, 8–11, 8–11

25 September	Malaysia	3–0	South Korea

Delia Arnold	3–0	Yang Yeon-soo	11–3, 11–3, 11–7
Vanessa Raj	3–0	Lee Ji-hyun	11–7, 11–7, 11–5
Low Wee Wern	3–0	Song Sun-mi	11–8, 11–7, 11–4

==== Pool B ====
Pos	Team	Pld	W	L	MF	MA	Pts	Qualification
1	India	3	3	0	8	1	3	Semifinals
2	Hong Kong	3	2	1	7	2	2	Semifinals
3	China	3	1	2	2	7	1	
4	Pakistan	3	0	3	1	8	0	

Source: ASF

24 September	Hong Kong	1–2	India

Annie Au	3–2	Dipika Pallikal	5–11, 11–6, 11–8, 10–12, 11–9
Joey Chan	2–3	Joshna Chinappa	11–6, 11–8, 5–11, 9–11, 9–11
Tong Tsz Wing	1–3	Anaka Alankamony	8–11, 13–11, 9–11, 5–11

24 September	Pakistan	1–2	China

Maria Toorpakai Wazir	3–0	Li Dongjin	11–8, 11–9, 11–3
Moqaddas Ashraf	0–3	Gu Jinyue	5–11, 5–11, 4–11
Sammer Anjum	1–3	Xiu Chen	13–11, 8–11, 10–12, 9–11

24 September	Hong Kong	3–0	China

Annie Au	3–0	Li Dongjin	11–4, 11–6, 11–5
Joey Chan	3–0	Gu Jinyue	11–2, 11–4, 11–4
Liu Tsz Ling	3–0	Xiu Chen	11–5, 11–1, 11–4

24 September	India	3–0	Pakistan

Dipika Pallikal	3–2	Maria Toorpakai Wazir	8–11, 7–11, 12–10, 11–9, 11–6
Joshna Chinappa	3–0	Moqaddas Ashraf	11–4, 11–8, 11–9
Aparajitha Balamurukan	3–0	Riffat Khan	11–3, 11–3, 11–3

25 September	Hong Kong	3–0	Pakistan

Joey Chan	3–0	Sammer Anjum	11–3, 11–4, 11–3
Liu Tsz Ling	3–0	Riffat Khan	11–6, 11–3, 11–3
Annie Au	3–0	Maria Toorpakai Wazir	11–3, 11–9, 11–5

25 September	India	3–0	China

Joshna Chinappa	3–0	Gu Jinyue	11–5, 11–7, 11–8
Anaka Alankamony	3–0	Xiu Chen	12–10, 11–7, 11–8
Dipika Pallikal	3–1	Li Dongjin	6–11, 11–6, 11–6, 11–5

=== Knockout stage ===
Semifinals			Finals
A1	Malaysia	2
B2	Hong Kong	0	A1	Malaysia	2
A2	South Korea	0	B1	India	0
B1	India	2

==== Semifinals ====
26 September	Malaysia	2–0	Hong Kong

Low Wee Wern	3–0	Joey Chan	11–5, 11–5, 11–7
Nicol David	3–1	Annie Au	4–11, 11–5, 11–8, 11–6

26 September	South Korea	0–2	India

Park Eun-ok	0–3	Joshna Chinappa	6–11, 11–13, 8–11
Song Sun-mi	1–3	Dipika Pallikal	4–11, 5–11, 11–8, 5–11

==== Gold medal match ====
27 September	Malaysia	2–0	India

Delia Arnold	3–0	Anaka Alankamony	11–9, 12–10, 11–2
Nicol David	3–0	Dipika Pallikal	11–7, 11–6, 11–3

== Non-participating athletes ==
- Duan Siyu (CHN)
