= Squash at the 2010 Asian Games – Women's team =

Women's team at the 2010 Asian Games
- Venue: Asian Games Town Gymnasium
- Dates: 22–25 November 2010
- Competitors: 25 from 7 nations

Medalists
gold medal	Malaysia; Delia Arnold, Nicol David, Low Wee Wern, Sharon Wee
silver medal	Hong Kong; Annie Au, Joey Chan, Rebecca Chiu, Liu Tsz Ling
bronze medal	India; Anaka Alankamony, Joshna Chinappa, Dipika Pallikal, Anwesha Reddy
bronze medal	South Korea; Kim Ga-hye, Kim Jin-hee, Park Eun-ok, Song Sun-mi

The women's team squash event was part of the squash programme at the 2010 Asian Games and took place from 22 to 25 November, at the Asian Games Town Gymnasium.

== Schedule ==
All times are China Standard Time (UTC+08:00)

Date	Time	Event
Monday, 22 November 2010	09:30	Preliminary round
Tuesday, 23 November 2010	09:30	Preliminary round
Wednesday, 24 November 2010	10:00	Semifinals
Thursday, 25 November 2010	10:00	Final

== Results ==
=== Preliminary round ===
==== Pool A ====
Pos	Team	Pld	W	L	MF	MA	Pts	Qualification
1	Malaysia	2	2	0	6	0	2	Semifinals
2	South Korea	2	1	1	2	4	1	Semifinals
3	Japan	2	0	2	1	5	0	

Source: ASF

22 November	South Korea	2–1	Japan

Song Sun-mi	0–3	Misaki Kobayashi	6–11, 6–11, 5–11
Park Eun-ok	3–2	Chinatsu Matsui	7–11, 11–6, 8–11, 11–8, 11–3
Kim Ga-hye	3–2	Miwa Maekawa	4–11, 13–11, 9–11, 11–4, 11–6

22 November	Malaysia	3–0	Japan

Nicol David	3–0	Misaki Kobayashi	11–4, 11–7, 11–4
Low Wee Wern	3–1	Chinatsu Matsui	11–6, 11–4, 8–11, 11–4
Delia Arnold	3–0	Miwa Maekawa	11–5, 11–3, 11–4

23 November	Malaysia	3–0	South Korea

Delia Arnold	3–0	Park Eun-ok	11–5, 13–11, 11–1
Low Wee Wern	3–1	Song Sun-mi	9–11, 11–7, 11–4, 13–11
Sharon Wee	3–0	Kim Ga-hye	11–3, 11–6, 11–5

==== Pool B ====
Pos	Team	Pld	W	L	MF	MA	Pts	Qualification
1	Hong Kong	3	3	0	9	0	3	Semifinals
2	India	3	2	1	6	3	2	Semifinals
3	China	3	1	2	2	7	1	
4	Pakistan	3	0	3	1	8	0	

Source: ASF

22 November	Hong Kong	3–0	Pakistan

Rebecca Chiu	3–0	Maria Toorpakai Wazir	11–6, 11–9, 11–6
Joey Chan	3–0	Saima Shoukat	11–5, 11–4, 11–5
Liu Tsz Ling	3–0	Zoya Khalid	11–3, 11–4, 11–5

22 November	India	3–0	China

Joshna Chinappa	3–0	Jiang Li	11–1, 11–7, 11–1
Dipika Pallikal	3–0	Li Dongjin	11–2, 11–5, 11–6
Anaka Alankamony	3–0	Gu Jinyue	11–7, 11–2, 11–5

22 November	Hong Kong	3–0	China

Rebecca Chiu	3–0	Jiang Li	11–8, 11–2, 11–2
Joey Chan	3–0	Li Dongjin	11–5, 11–7, 11–8
Liu Tsz Ling	3–0	Gu Jinyue	11–3, 11–8, 11–8

22 November	India	3–0	Pakistan

Joshna Chinappa	3–1	Maria Toorpakai Wazir	11–8, 9–11, 11–4, 11–5
Dipika Pallikal	3–0	Saima Shoukat	11–7, 11–3, 11–4
Anaka Alankamony	3–0	Zoya Khalid	11–6, 11–1, 11–7

23 November	Hong Kong	3–0	India

Rebecca Chiu	3–1	Dipika Pallikal	11–8, 9–11, 12–10, 11–5
Annie Au	3–0	Joshna Chinappa	11–7, 11–7, 11–9
Joey Chan	3–1	Anaka Alankamony	11–9, 6–11, 11–8, 11–6

23 November	China	2–1	Pakistan

Li Dongjin	3–0	Saima Shoukat	11–3, 11–1, 11–1
Jiang Li	0–3	Maria Toorpakai Wazir	5–11, 8–11, 6–11
Gu Jinyue	3–0	Zoya Khalid	11–6, 11–8, 11–5

=== Knockout round ===
Semifinals			Final
A1	Malaysia	2
B2	India	0	A1	Malaysia	2
B1	Hong Kong	2	B1	Hong Kong	0
A2	South Korea	0

==== Semifinals ====
24 November	Malaysia	2–0	India

Low Wee Wern	3–0	Anaka Alankamony	11–2, 11–4, 11–6
Nicol David	3–0	Joshna Chinappa	11–4, 11–2, 11–3

24 November	Hong Kong	2–0	South Korea

Rebecca Chiu	3–0	Park Eun-ok	11–5, 12–10, 11–8
Annie Au	3–0	Song Sun-mi	11–7, 11–2, 11–4

==== Final ====
25 November	Malaysia	2–0	Hong Kong

Low Wee Wern	3–1	Rebecca Chiu	11–4, 7–11, 11–6, 11–9
Nicol David	3–0	Annie Au	11–8, 11–7, 11–6

== Non-participating athletes ==
- Anwesha Reddy (IND)
- Kim Jin-hee (KOR)
