= 2017 Women's British Open Squash Championship =

British Open
- Women's British Open

Details
- Event name: Allam British Open 2017
- Location: Hull, England
- Venue: Airco Arena

Women's Winner
- Category: World Series
- Prize money: $150,000
- Year: World Tour 2017

The Women's Allam British Open 2017 is the women's edition of the 2017 British Open Squash Championships, which is a PSA World Series event (Prize money : 150,000 $). The event took place at the Airco Arena in Hull in England from 19 to 26 March. Laura Massaro won her second British Open trophy, beating Sarah-Jane Perry in the final.

== Seeds ==
1. (Egypt) Nour El Sherbini
2. (France) Camille Serme
3. (Egypt) Raneem El Weleily
4. (Egypt) Nouran Gohar
5. (England) Laura Massaro
6. (Malaysia) Nicol David
7. (England) Sarah-Jane Perry
8. (England) Alison Waters
9. (New Zealand) Joelle King
10. (Hong Kong) Annie Au
11. (Egypt) Nour El Tayeb
12. (India) Joshna Chinappa
13. (England) Emily Whitlock
14. (Hong Kong) Joey Chan
15. (Australia) Donna Urquhart
16. (Egypt) Salma Hany Ibrahim

== Draw and results ==
First round
1 | (Egypt) Nour El Sherbini | 11 | 11 | 11
(Denmark) Line Hansen | 5 | 7 | 3
10 | (Hong Kong) Annie Au | 7 | 6 | 11 | 11 | 11
(France) Coline Aumard | 11 | 11 | 9 | 5 | 9
13 | (England) Emily Whitlock | 11 | 1 | 11 | 11
(Hong Kong) Liu Tsz-Ling | 8 | 11 | 6 | 3
8 | (England) Alison Waters | 11 | 7 | w/o
(Egypt) Mariam Metwally | 5 | 2 | ret
5 | (England) Laura Massaro | 11 | 11 | 11 | 11
(India) Dipika Pallikal Karthik | 4 | 5 | 13 | 1
9 | (New Zealand) Joelle King | 11 | 9 | 4 | 9
(Egypt) Mayar Hany | 7 | 11 | 11 | 11
12 | (India) Joshna Chinappa | 11 | 8 | 11 | 12
(Australia) Rachael Grinham | 6 | 11 | 6 | 10
3 | (Egypt) Raneem El Weleily | 13 | 11 | 11
(England) Fiona Moverley | 11 | 7 | 6
4 | (Egypt) Nouran Gohar | 10 | 12 | 5 | 8
(Egypt) Nada Abbas | 12 | 14 | 11 | 11
15 | (Australia) Donna Urquhart | 9 | 14 | 11 | 11
(England) Millie Tomlinson | 11 | 12 | 6 | 5
16 | (Egypt) Salma Hany Ibrahim | 7 | 5 | 9
(Wales) Tesni Evans | 11 | 11 | 11
7 | (England) Sarah-Jane Perry | 11 | 11 | 11
(Belgium) Nele Gilis | 6 | 5 | 5
6 | (Malaysia) Nicol David | 11 | 11 | 11
(United States) Olivia Blatchford | 7 | 7 | 4
14 | (Hong Kong) Joey Chan | 11 | 11 | 11
(England) Jenny Duncalf | 2 | 6 | 7
11 | (Egypt) Nour El Tayeb | 11 | 11 | 11
(Mexico) Samantha Terán | 3 | 7 | 4
2 | (France) Camille Serme | 11 | 12 | 11
(Egypt) Hania El Hammamy | 9 | 11 | 3

Second round
1 | (Egypt) El Sherbini | 11 | 11 | 11
10 | (Hong Kong) Au | 4 | 8 | 6
13 | (England) Whitlock | 11 | 11 | 11
8 | (England) Waters | 4 | 7 | 11
5 | (England) Massaro | 11 | 11 | 11
(Egypt) Hany | 5 | 1 | 9
12 | (India) Chinappa | 8 | 7 | 7
3 | (Egypt) El Welily | 11 | 11 | 11
(Egypt) Abbas | 11 | 8 | 3 | 11 | 1
15 | (Australia) Urquhart | 8 | 11 | 11 | 6 | 11
(Wales) Evans | 5 | 8 | 8
7 | (England) Perry | 11 | 11 | 11
6 | (Malaysia) David | 11 | 14 | 9 | 11
14 | (Hong Kong) Chan | 4 | 12 | 11 | 2
11 | (Egypt) El Tayeb | 8 | 9 | 11 | 9
2 | (France) Serme | 11 | 11 | 5 | 11

Quarter finals
1 | (Egypt) El Sherbini | 11 | 11 | 11
13 | (England) Whitlock | 3 | 4 | 4
5 | (England) Massaro | 11 | 13 | 11 | 11
3 | (Egypt) El Welily | 3 | 15 | 6 | 6
15 | (Australia) Urquhart | 4 | 11 | 11 | 11 | 4
7 | (England) Perry | 11 | 7 | 13 | 6 | 11
6 | (Malaysia) David | 11 | 11 | 11
2 | (France) Serme | 6 | 6 | 8

Semi-finals
1 | (Egypt) El Sherbini | 11 | 11 | 5 | 3 | 6
5 | (England) Massaro | 5 | 7 | 11 | 11 | 11
Final
5 | (England) Massaro | 11 | 11 | 6 | 11
7 | (England) Perry | 8 | 8 | 11 | 6
7 | (England) Perry | 11 | 7 | 13 | 11
6 | (Malaysia) David | 8 | 11 | 11 | 7

== See also ==
- 2017 Men's British Open Squash Championship
- 2017 Women's World Squash Championship
