= 2019 Women's Asian Individual Squash Championships =

2019 Asian Individual Squash Championships
- 18th Women's Asian Individual Squash Championships
- Location: (Malaysia) Kuala Lumpur
- Venue: National Squash Centre
- Website; SRAM Website

Results
- Champion: (India) Joshna Chinappa
- Runner-up: (Hong Kong) Annie Au
- Semi-finalists: (Malaysia) Low Wee Wern (Malaysia) Sivasangari Subramaniam

The 2019 Women's Asian Individual Squash Championships is the women's edition of the 2019 Asian Individual Squash Championships, which serves as the individual Asian championship for squash players. The event took place at National Squash Centre in Kuala Lumpur from 1 to 5 May 2019.

== Seeds ==
1. (Hong Kong) Annie Au (final)
2. (India) Joshna Chinappa (champions)
3. (Hong Kong) Joey Chan (quarterfinals)
4. (Malaysia) Low Wee Wern (semifinals)
5. (Hong Kong) Liu Tsz Ling (quarterfinals)
6. (Malaysia) Sivasangari Subramaniam (semifinals)
7. (Malaysia) Rachel Arnold (third round)
8. (Hong Kong) Tong Tsz Wing (third round)

9. (Japan) Satomi Watanabe (quarterfinals)
10. (India) Sunayna Kuruvilla (third round)
11. (Philippines) Jemyca Aribado (third round)
12. (Malaysia) Lai Wen Li (third round)
13. (Malaysia) Aifa Azman (third round)
14. (India) Tanvi Khanna (quarterfinals)
15. (Thailand) Anatana Prasertratanakul (second round)
16. (India) Aparajitha Balamurukan (third round)

== Draw and results ==
=== Finals ===
Semi-finals
1	(Hong Kong) Annie Au	11	11	13	11
4	(Malaysia) Low Wee Wern	6	13	11	4
6	(Malaysia) Sivasangari Subramaniam	7	10	3
2	(India) Joshna Chinappa	11	12	11

Final
1	(Hong Kong) Annie Au	5	11	6	6
2	(India) Joshna Chinappa	11	8	11	11

=== Top half ===
==== Section 1 ====
First round
(Iran) Hadis Farzad	11	7	12	7	11
(Chinese Taipei) Lin Chiao-chi	9	11	10	11	6

Second round
1	(Hong Kong) Annie Au	11	11	11
(Iran) Hadis Farzad	5	7	4
(Japan) Risa Sugimoto	11	5	7	7
12	(Malaysia) Lai Wen Li	8	11	11	11
16	(India) Aparajitha Balamurukan	11	11	11
(Sri Lanka) Yeheni Kuruppu	3	1	1
(Chinese Taipei) Lee Yi-shuan	5	4	1
5	(Hong Kong) Liu Tsz Ling	11	11	11

Third Round
1	(Hong Kong) Annie Au	11	11	11
12	(Malaysia) Lai Wen Li	8	0	2
16	(India) Aparajitha Balamurukan	9	9	1
5	(Hong Kong) Liu Tsz Ling	11	11	11

Quarter-finals
1	(Hong Kong) Annie Au	12	12	11
5	(Hong Kong) Liu Tsz Ling	10	10	5

==== Section 2 ====
First round

Second round
8	(Hong Kong) Tong Tsz Wing	11	11	11
(Chinese Taipei) Wu Yi-chen	3	0	3
(Sri Lanka) Fathoum Issadeen	4	6	0
9	(Japan) Satomi Watanabe	11	11	11
10	(India) Sunayna Kuruvilla	13	11	11	11
(South Korea) Choe Yu-ra	15	5	4	7
(Malaysia) Chan Yiwen	5	8	1
4	(Malaysia) Low Wee Wern	11	11	11

Third Round
8	(Hong Kong) Tong Tsz Wing	9	5	9
9	(Japan) Satomi Watanabe	11	11	11
10	(India) Sunayna Kuruvilla	7	7	7
4	(Malaysia) Low Wee Wern	11	11	11

Quarter-finals
9	(Japan) Satomi Watanabe	11	11	1	8	8
4	(Malaysia) Low Wee Wern	5	5	11	11	11

=== Bottom half ===
==== Section 3 ====
First round

Second round
3	(Hong Kong) Joey Chan	11	11	11
(South Korea) Eum Hwa-yeong	8	3	5
(Thailand) Tuddaw Thamronglarp	4	4	8
11	(Philippines) Jemyca Aribado	11	11	11
13	(Malaysia) Aifa Azman	11	11	11
(Iran) Fereshteh Eghtedari	3	7	7
(Thailand) Pranghatai Phongrattana	1	1	1
6	(Malaysia) Sivasangari Subramaniam	11	11	11

Third Round
3	(Hong Kong) Joey Chan	11	11	12
11	(Philippines) Jemyca Aribado	5	6	10
13	(Malaysia) Aifa Azman	11	5	7	7
6	(Malaysia) Sivasangari Subramaniam	6	11	11	11

Quarter-finals
3	(Hong Kong) Joey Chan	7	8	17	8
6	(Malaysia) Sivasangari Subramaniam	11	11	15	11

==== Section 4 ====
First round
(Chinese Taipei) Hu Lu Yung-chi	11	11	11
(Sri Lanka) Anargi Perera	2	6	5

Second round
7	(Malaysia) Rachel Arnold	11	11	11
(Sri Lanka) Naduni Gunawardane	2	4	3
(South Korea) Kim Ga-hye	4	5	6
14	(India) Tanvi Khanna	11	11	11
15	(Thailand) Anatana Prasertratanakul	5	4	2
(South Korea) Lee Ji-hyun	11	11	11
(Chinese Taipei) Hu Lu Yung-chi	3	3	3
2	(India) Joshna Chinappa	11	11	11

Third Round
7	(Malaysia) Rachel Arnold	11	11	16	7	6
14	(India) Tanvi Khanna	9	5	18	11	11
(South Korea) Lee Ji-hyun	5	6	5
2	(India) Joshna Chinappa	11	11	11

Quarter-finals
14	(India) Tanvi Khanna	10	11	7
2	(India) Joshna Chinappa	12	13	11

== See also ==
- 2019 Men's Asian Individual Squash Championships
- Asian Individual Squash Championships

Preceded by Chennai; 2017	Asian Squash Championships; Malaysia (Kuala Lumpur); 2019	Succeeded by Asian Championships; 2021
