= 2021 Women's Asian Individual Squash Championships =

Squash competition

2021 Asian Individual Squash Championships
- 19th Women's Asian Individual Squash Championships
- Location: (Pakistan) Islamabad
- Venue: Mushaf Squash Complex

Results
- Champion: (Hong Kong) Tong Tsz Wing
- Runner-up: (Malaysia) Rachel Arnold
- Semi-finalists: (Hong Kong) Liu Tsz Ling (Hong Kong) Ho Tze Lok

The 2021 Women's Asian Individual Squash Championships is the women's edition of the 2021 Asian Individual Squash Championships, which serves as the individual Asian championship for squash players. The event took place at Mushaf Squash Complex in Islamabad from 15 to 19 December 2021.

== Seeds ==
1. (Hong Kong) Liu Tsz Ling (semifinals)
2. (Malaysia) Rachel Arnold (finals)
3. (Hong Kong) Ho Tze Lok (semifinals)
4. (Hong Kong) Tong Tsz Wing (champion)
5. (Malaysia) Aifa Azman (quarterfinals)
6. (Hong Kong) Chan Sin Yuk (quarterfinals)
7. (Malaysia) Chan Yiwen (quarterfinals)
8. (Pakistan) Zynab Khan (first round)

9. (Pakistan) Noor Ul Huda (first round)
10. (Pakistan) Saima Shoukat (first round)
11. (Pakistan) Anam Mustafa Aziz (first round)
12. (Pakistan) Noor Ul Ain Ijaz (first round)
13. (Malaysia) Ainaa Amani (quarterfinals)
14. (Pakistan) Komal Khan (first round)
15. (Sri Lanka) Fathoum Issadeen (first round)
16. (Sri Lanka) Yeheni Kuruppu (first round)

== Draw and results ==
Round of 16
1	(Hong Kong) Liu Tsz Ling	11	11	11
9	(Pakistan) Noor Ul Huda	4	3	3
13	(Malaysia) Ainaa Amani	11	11	11
8	(Pakistan) Zynab Khan	5	2	0
5	(Malaysia) Aifa Azman	11	11	11
15	(Sri Lanka) Fathoum Issadeen	5	7	4
10	(Pakistan) Saima Shoukat	5	3	0
4	(Hong Kong) Tong Tsz Wing	11	11	11
3	(Hong Kong) Ho Tze Lok	11	11	11
16	(Sri Lanka) Yeheni Kuruppu	2	0	2
14	(Pakistan) Komal Khan	5	1	1
7	(Malaysia) Chan Yiwen	11	11	11
6	(Hong Kong) Chan Sin Yuk	11	11	11
11	(Pakistan) Anam Mustafa Aziz	2	1	1
12	(Pakistan) Noor Ul Ain Ijaz	5	1	1
2	(Malaysia) Rachel Arnold	11	11	11

Quarterfinals
1	(Hong Kong) Liu Tsz Ling	11	5	12	11
13	(Malaysia) Ainaa Amani	9	11	10	6
5	(Malaysia) Aifa Azman	5	9	11	11	10
4	(Hong Kong) Tong Tsz Wing	11	11	8	3	12
3	(Hong Kong) Ho Tze Lok	11	14	11
7	(Malaysia) Chan Yiwen	5	12	9
6	(Hong Kong) Chan Sin Yuk	7	9	7
2	(Malaysia) Rachel Arnold	11	11	11

Semifinals
1	(Hong Kong) Liu Tsz Ling	10	11	4	6
4	(Hong Kong) Tong Tsz Wing	12	4	11	11
3	(Hong Kong) Ho Tze Lok	4	9	11	7
2	(Malaysia) Rachel Arnold	11	11	5	11

Finals
4	(Hong Kong) Tong Tsz Wing	11	13	11
2	(Malaysia) Rachel Arnold	8	11	5

Seed:
Draw:
Results:

== See also ==
- 2021 Men's Asian Individual Squash Championships
- Asian Individual Squash Championships

Preceded by Kuala Lumpur; 2019	Asian Squash Championships; Pakistan (Islamabad); 2021	Succeeded by Asian Championships; 2023
