= 2017 Women's Asian Individual Squash Championships =

2017 Asian Individual Squash Championships

Details
- Event name: 2017 Asian Individual Squash Championships
- Location: (India) Chennai
- Venue: Express Avenue Mall
- Website squashinthemall.com

The 2017 Women's Asian Individual Squash Championships is the women's edition of the 2017 Asian Individual Squash Championships, which serves as the individual Asian championship for squash players. The event took place at Express Avenue Mall in Chennai from 26 to 30 April 2017. Defending champion Nicol David decided to skip the event. Joshana Chinappa defeated her compatriot Dipika Pallikal to win her first Asian Individual Squash Championship title.

== Seeds ==
1. (Hong Kong) Annie Au (semifinals)
2. (India) Joshna Chinappa (champion)
3. (Hong Kong) Joey Chan (quarterfinals)
4. (India) Dipika Pallikal (final)
5. (Hong Kong) Liu Tsz-Ling (quarterfinals)
6. (Hong Kong) Tong Tsz Wing (semifinals)
7. (Japan) Misaki Kobayashi (quarterfinals)
8. (Malaysia) Rachel Arnold (second round)
9. (India) Sachika Ingale (first round)
10. (Malaysia) Lee Andrea Jia Qi (second round)
11. (Malaysia) Zoe Foo Yuk Han (second round)
12. (South Korea) Choe Yura (first round)
13. (Philippines) Jemyca Aribado (second round)
14. (Iran) Taba Taghavi (first round)
15. (Iran) Ailee Nayeri (first round)
16. (Japan) Satomi Watanabe (quarterfinals)

== Draw and results ==
=== Finals ===
Semi finals
1	(Hong Kong) Annie Au	9	11	7	9
4	(India) Dipika Pallikal	11	7	11	11
6	(Hong Kong) Tong Tsz Wing	6	4	8
2	(India) Joshana Chinappa	11	11	11

Final
4	(India) Dipika Pallikal	15	10	13	4	4
2	(India) Joshana Chinappa	13	12	11	11	11

=== Top half ===
First round
1	(Hong Kong) Annie Au
BYE
(South Korea) Lee Jihyun	9	11	11	11
14	(Iran) Taba Taghavi	11	5	6	6
16	(Japan) Satomi Watanabe	11	12	11
(India) Urwashi Joshi	5	10	3
(South Korea) Park Eunok	8	8	6
8	(Malaysia) Rachel Mae Arnold	11	11	11
5	(Hong Kong) Liu Tsz Ling	11	11	11
(Singapore) Wai Yhann Au Yeong	9	7	5
(South Korea) Eum Hwayeong	4	4	11	11	11
15	(Iran) Ailee Nayeri	11	11	3	6	6
10	(Malaysia) Lee Andrea Jia Qi	11	11	11
(Iran) Fereshteh Eghtedari	5	3	4
BYE
4	(India) Dipika Pallikal

Second round
1	(Hong Kong) Annie Au	11	11	11
(South Korea) Lee Jihyun	3	5	3
16	(Japan) Satomi Watanabe	10	11	5	11	11
8	(Malaysia) Rachel Mae Arnold	12	7	11	5	4
5	(Hong Kong) Liu Tsz Ling	11	11	11
(South Korea) Eum Hwayeong	6	6	4
10	(Malaysia) Lee Andrea Jia Qi	12	5	5
4	(India) Dipika Pallikal	14	11	11

Quarter finals
1	(Hong Kong) Annie Au	11	11	11
16	(Japan) Satomi Watanabe	5	6	3
5	(Hong Kong) Liu Tsz Ling	3	6	6
4	(India) Dipika Pallikal	11	11	11

Semi finals
1	(Hong Kong) Annie Au	9	11	7	9
4	(India) Dipika Pallikal	11	7	11	11

=== Bottom half ===
First round
3	(Hong Kong) Joey Chan
BYE
(India) Lakshya R.	11	4	11	6	6
11	(Malaysia) Foo Zoe Yuk Han	7	11	9	11	11
12	(South Korea) Choe Yura	4	8	8
(India) Sunayna Kuruvilla	11	11	11
(Iran) Ghazal Sharafpour	4	1	4
6	(Hong Kong) Tong Tsz Wing	11	11	11
7	(Japan) Misaki Kobayashi	12	11	11
(Philippines) Yvonne Alyssa Dalida	10	1	2
(Malaysia) Aifa Azman	11	11	7	11	13
9	(India) Sachika Ingale	7	6	11	13	11
13	(Philippines) Jemyca Aribado	11	11	11
(Singapore) Sneha Sivakumar	5	2	9
BYE
2	(India) Joshana Chinappa

Second round
3	(Hong Kong) Joey Chan	11	11	11
11	(Malaysia) Foo Zoe Yuk Han	6	7	6
(India) Sunayna Kuruvilla	6	4	6
6	(Hong Kong) Tong Tsz Wing	11	11	11
7	(Japan) Misaki Kobayashi	11	12	2	11
(Malaysia) Aifa Azman	6	10	11	4
13	(Philippines) Jemyca Aribado	7	9	7
2	(India) Joshana Chinappa	11	11	11

Quarter finals
3	(Hong Kong) Joey Chan	11	9	6	7
6	(Hong Kong) Tong Tsz Wing	6	11	11	11
7	(Japan) Misaki Kobayashi	7	3	11	10
2	(India) Joshana Chinappa	11	11	9	12

Semi finals
6	(Hong Kong) Tong Tsz Wing	6	4	8
2	(India) Joshana Chinappa	11	11	11

== See also ==
- 2017 Men's Asian Individual Squash Championships
- Asian Individual Squash Championships

Preceded by Kuwait; 2015	Asian Squash Championships; India (Chennai); 2017	Succeeded by Kuala Lumpur; 2019
