= 2011 Men's Asian Individual Squash Championships =

2011 Asian Individual Squash Championships

Details
- Event name: 2011 Asian Individual Squash Championships
- Location: Malaysia, Penang
- Website www.squashsite.co.uk/2009/asianindividuals2011.htm

The 2011 Men's Asian Individual Squash Championships is the men's edition of the 2011 Asian Individual Squash Championships, which serves as the individual Asian championship for squash players. The event took place in Peang in Malaysia from 26 to 30 April 2011. Mohd Nafiizwan Adnan won his first Asian Individual Championships title, defeating Ong Beng Hee in the final.

== Seeds ==
1. [1*] (Malaysia) Ong Beng Hee (final)
2. [2*] (Pakistan) Farhan Mehboob (semifinals)
3. [3/4*] (Malaysia) Mohd Nafiizwan Adnan (champion)
4. [3/4*] (Kuwait) Abdullah Al Muzayen (quarterfinals)
5. [5/8*] (Hong Kong) Max Lee (third round)
6. [5/8*] (India) Siddharth Suchde (semifinals)
7. [5/8*] (Malaysia) Muhd Asyraf Azan (quarterfinals)
8. [5/8*] (Hong Kong) Dick Lau (third round)
9. [9/16*] (Malaysia) Kamran Khan (third round)
10. [9/16*] (Hong Kong) Leo Au (third round)
11. [9/16*] (Pakistan) Waqar Mehboob (second round)
12. [9/16*] (India) Harinder Pal Sandhu (quarterfinals)
13. [9/16*] (Pakistan) Waqas Mehboob (third round)
14. [9/16*] (Malaysia) Kam Hing Choong (third round)
15. [9/16*] (Kuwait) Ali Bader Al-Ramzi (third round)
16. [9/16*] (Malaysia) Ivan Yuen (third round)

== Draw and results ==
=== Finals ===
Quarter finals
1	(Malaysia) Ong Beng Hee	11	11	9	15
(Malaysia) Elvinn Keo	8	4	11	13
5/8	(India) Siddharth Suchde	12	11	11	8	11
3/4	(Kuwait) Abdullah Al Muzayen	14	6	8	11	8
3/4	(Malaysia) Mohd Nafiizwan Adnan	11	11	3	11
5/8	(Malaysia) Muhd Asyraf Azan	9	5	11	8
9/16	(India) Harinder Pal Sandhu	8	8	4
2	(Pakistan) Farhan Mehboob	11	11	11

Semi finals
1	(Malaysia) Ong Beng Hee	11	11	6	10	11
5/8	(India) Siddharth Suchde	6	9	11	12	4
3/4	(Malaysia) Mohd Nafiizwan Adnan	11	9	11	11
2	(Pakistan) Farhan Mehboob	8	11	8	9

Final
1	(Malaysia) Ong Beng Hee	7	11	7	8
3/4	(Malaysia) Mohd Nafiizwan Adnan	11	7	11	11

=== Top half ===
==== Section 1 ====
First round
1	(Malaysia) Ong Beng Hee
(South Korea) Nyeon Ho Lee	11	12	12
(Japan) Yuta Fukui	9	10	10
(Sri Lanka) Yasir Issadeen	7	9	11	12
(Chinese Taipei) Chen Ching Han	11	11	8	14
9/16	(Malaysia) Kamran Khan
9/16	(Pakistan) Waqar Mehboob
(Kuwait) Ammar Ab. Al Tamimi	11	2	6	11	7
(Malaysia) Elvinn Keo	4	11	11	8	11
(Philippines) Robert Garcia	8	11	7	8
(Singapore) Samuel Kang	11	9	11	11
5/8	(Hong Kong) Dick Lau

Second round
1	(Malaysia) Ong Beng Hee	11	11	11
(South Korea) Nyeon Ho Lee	5	4	9
(Chinese Taipei) Chen Ching Han	7	4	4
9/16	(Malaysia) Kamran Khan	11	11	11
9/16	(Pakistan) Waqar Mehboob	5	11	4	11	2
(Malaysia) Elvinn Keo	11	3	11	8	11
(Singapore) Samuel Kang	2	7	7
5/8	(Hong Kong) Dick Lau	11	11	11

Third round
1	(Malaysia) Ong Beng Hee	12	11	11
9/16	(Malaysia) Kamran Khan	10	8	9
(Malaysia) Elvinn Keo	11	10	11	6	11
5/8	(Hong Kong) Dick Lau	7	11	8	11	9

Quarter finals
1	(Malaysia) Ong Beng Hee	11	11	9	15
(Malaysia) Elvinn Keo	8	4	11	13

==== Section 2 ====
First round
5/8	(India) Siddharth Suchde
(Jordan) Ahmad Al Zabidi	11	11	10	11
(Singapore) Marcus Phua	8	9	12	7
(India) Mahesh Mangaonkar	11	11	11
(Chinese Taipei) Chen Shu Kai	4	3	6
(Philippines) Richard Espinola	4	6	14
9/16	(Malaysia) Kam Hing Choong	11	11	16
9/16	(Malaysia) Ivan Yuen
(Indonesia) Soni Ramdhani	11	8	8	11	6
(Iran) Navid Malek Sabet	7	11	11	6	11
(Malaysia) Muhd Ad. Bahtiar	11	11	11
(Philippines) David William Pelino	9	3	3
3/4	(Kuwait) Abdullah Al Muzayen

Second round
5/8	(India) Siddharth Suchde	11	11	3
(Jordan) Ahmad Al Zabidi	7	4	0
(India) Mahesh Mangaonkar	9	6	11	11	4
9/16	(Malaysia) Kam Hing Choong	11	11	6	3	11
9/16	(Malaysia) Ivan Yuen	11	11	11
(Iran) Navid Malek Sabet	3	5	2
(Malaysia) Muhd Ad. Bahtiar	9	12	1	5
3/4	(Kuwait) Abdullah Al Muzayen	11	10	11	11

Third round
5/8	(India) Siddharth Suchde	11	11	11
9/16	(Malaysia) Kam Hing Choong	8	8	4
9/16	(Malaysia) Ivan Yuen	11	4	3	8
3/4	(Kuwait) Abdullah Al Muzayen	8	11	11	11

Quarter finals
5/8	(India) Siddharth Suchde	12	11	11	8	11
3/4	(Kuwait) Abdullah Al Muzayen	14	6	8	11	6

=== Bottom half ===
==== Section 1 ====
First round
1	(Malaysia) Mohd Nafi. Adnan
(Hong Kong) Wong Hon Fung	11	11	11
(Chinese Taipei) Chang Chun Yu	3	2	4
(South Korea) Seung Taek Lee	13	7	11	11
(Japan) Ken Okada	11	11	6	7
(Chinese Taipei) Huang Cheng Yao	11	7	6	9
9/16	(Pakistan) Waqas Mehboob	6	11	11	11
9/16	(Hong Kong) Leo Au	11	11	11
(Hong Kong) Seung Joon Lee	8	7	7
(Jordan) Ahmad Al Saraj
(Iran) Mohammad Sanaee	w/o
(South Korea) Se Hyun Lee	11	11	11
(Japan) Ryosei Kobayashi	4	1	7
5/8	(Malaysia) Muhd Asyraf Azan

Second round
3/4	(Malaysia) Mohd Nafi. Adnan	13	11	11
(Hong Kong) Wong Hon Fung	11	2	6
(South Korea) Seung Taek Lee	7	6	8
9/16	(Pakistan) Waqas Mehboob	11	11	11
9/16	(Hong Kong) Leo Au	11	11	11
(Jordan) Ahmad Al Saraj	2	7	4
(South Korea) Se Hyun Lee	9	5	11	6
5/8	(Malaysia) Muhd Asyraf Azan	11	11	9	11

Third round
3/4	(Malaysia) Mohd Nafi. Adnan	11	11	11
9/16	(Pakistan) Waqas Mehboob	1	6	6
9/16	(Hong Kong) Leo Au	9	11	2	5
5/8	(Malaysia) Muhd Asyraf Azan	11	8	11	11

Quarter finals
3/4	(Malaysia) Mohd Nafi. Adnan	11	11	3	11
5/8	(Malaysia) Muhd Asyraf Azan	9	5	11	8

==== Section 2 ====
First round
5/8	(Hong Kong) Max Lee
(Sri Lanka) Eranga Alwis	3	5	6
(Indonesia) Johny Londong	11	11	11
(Kuwait) Salem Mohamad	13	6	11	6	9
(Singapore) Vivian Rhamanan	11	11	5	11	11
9/16	(India) Harinder Pal Sandhu
9/16	(Kuwait) Ali Bader Al-Ramzi	11	11	11
(China) Shen Jiaqi	1	6	2
(Iran) Mohd. Sadeghpour
(Sri Lanka) Lal Wickremasinghe	w/o
(China) Wang Junjie	4	5	2
(Japan) Shinnosuke Tsukue	11	11	11
2	(Pakistan) Farhan Mehboob

Second round
5/8	(Hong Kong) Max Lee	11	11	11
(Indonesia) Johny Londong	9	2	4
(Singapore) Vivian Rhamanan	3	9	11	11	3
9/16	(India) Harinder Pal Sandhu	11	11	6	8	11
9/16	(Kuwait) Ali Bader Al-Ramzi	11	12	11	11
(Iran) Mohd. Sadeghpour	6	14	3	5
(Japan) Shinnosuke Tsukue	3	3	4
2	(Pakistan) Farhan Mehboob	11	11	11

Third round
5/8	(Hong Kong) Max Lee	8	8	11	11
9/16	(India) Harinder Pal Sandhu	11	11	6	13
9/16	(Kuwait) Ali Bader Al-Ramzi	8	8	4
2	(Pakistan) Farhan Mehboob	11	11	11

Quarter finals
9/16	(India) Harinder Pal Sandhu	8	8	4
2	(Pakistan) Farhan Mehboob	11	11	11

== See also ==
- 2011 Women's Asian Individual Squash Championships
- Asian Individual Squash Championships

Preceded by India (Chennai); 2010	Asian Squash Championships; Malaysia (Penang); 2011	Succeeded by Pakistan (Islamabad); 2013
