= 2021 Women's Asian Team Squash Championships =

2021 Asian Squash Team Championships
- 18th Women's Asian Squash Team Championships
- Location: Kuala Lumpur, Malaysia
- Venue: National Squash Centre
- Date: 30 November – 4 December

Results
- Champions: Malaysia
- Runners-up: Hong Kong
- Third place: India, Japan (shared)

The 2021 Women's Asian Squash Team Championships was the 18th edition of Asian women's team championship for squash players. The event was held at National Squash Centre in Kuala Lumpur, Malaysia, from 30 November to 4 December 2021.

== Participating teams and seeds ==
1. Hong Kong
2. Malaysia
3. India
4. Japan

5. South Korea
6. Iran
7. Philippines
8. Sri Lanka

== Group stage ==
=== Pool A ===
Pos.	Team	Players	TP	TW	TL	MW	ML	GW	GL	PW	PL	Pts	Qualification
1	Hong Kong	Liu Tsz Ling, Ho Tze Lok, Tong Tsz Wing, Lee Ka Yi	3	3	0	8	1	25	6	329	181	6	Semifinals
2	Japan	Satomi Watanabe, Risa Sugimoto, Akari Midorikawa, Rafu Takahashi	3	2	1	6	3	21	13	318	293	4	Semifinals
3	South Korea	Eum Hwa Yeong, Heo Min-gyeong, Oh Sung Hee, Song Dong Ju	3	1	2	1	8	14	17	265	267	2	5th–8th places
4	Sri Lanka	Chanithma Simaly, Yeheni Kuruppu, Fathoum Issadeen, Dewmini Gallage	3	0	3	0	9	3	27	152	323	0	5th–8th places

Hong Kong
3

National Squash Complex, Court 7
30 November 2021

South Korea
0

			1	2	3	4	5
1	(Hong Kong) (South Korea)	Ho Tze Lok; Eum Hwa Yeong	11; 9	9; 11	11; 6	12; 10
2	(Hong Kong) (South Korea)	Tong Tsz Wing; Heo Min-gyeong	11; 3	11; 4	11; 4
3	(Hong Kong) (South Korea)	Lee Ka Yi; Oh Sung Hee	11; 8	9; 11	11; 3	11; 2

Japan
3

National Squash Complex, Court 9
30 November 2021

Sri Lanka
0

			1	2	3	4	5
1	(Japan) (Sri Lanka)	Satomi Watanabe; Chanithma Sinaly	11; 4	11; 3	11; 1
2	(Japan) (Sri Lanka)	Risa Sugimoto; Yeheni Kuruppu	8; 11	11; 7	11; 13	11; 3	11; 7
3	(Japan) (Sri Lanka)	Rafu Takahashi; Hasanain Dakheel	11; 9	6; 11	11; 7	12; 10

Hong Kong
2

National Squash Complex, Grand Court
1 December 2021

Japan
1

			1	2	3	4	5
1	(Hong Kong) (Japan)	Liu Tsz Ling; Satomi Watanabe	6; 11	8; 11	11; 6	9; 11
2	(Hong Kong) (Japan)	Ho Tze Lok; Risa Sugimoto	12; 10	11; 3	11; 8
3	(Hong Kong) (Japan)	Tong Tsz Wing; Akari Midorikawa	11; 4	11; 13	11; 3	11; 3

South Korea
3

National Squash Complex, Court 8
1 December 2021

Sri Lanka
0

			1	2	3	4	5
1	(South Korea) (Sri Lanka)	Eum Hwa Yeong; Chanithma Sinaly	11; 7	11; 2	11; 2
2	(South Korea) (Sri Lanka)	Heo Min-gyeong; Yeheni Kuruppu	11; 3	11; 4	11; 9
3	(South Korea) (Sri Lanka)	Song Dong Ju; Fathoum Issadeen	11; 7	11; 2	11; 3

Hong Kong
3

National Squash Complex, Court 8
2 December 2021

Sri Lanka
0

			1	2	3	4	5
1	(Hong Kong) (Sri Lanka)	Liu Tsz Ling; Yeheni Kuruppu	11; 2	11; 3	11; 2
2	(Hong Kong) (Sri Lanka)	Tong Tsz Wing; Fathoum Issadeen	11; 6	11; 3	11; 3
3	(Hong Kong) (Sri Lanka)	Lee Ka Yi; Dewmini Gallage	11; 3	11; 2	11; 3

Japan
2

National Squash Complex, Grand Court
2 December 2021

South Korea
1

			1	2	3	4	5
1	(Japan) (South Korea)	Satomi Watanabe; Eum Hwa Yeong	11; 4	11; 6	12; 10
2	(Japan) (South Korea)	Risa Sugimoto; Heo Min-gyeong	11; 4	11; 6	11; 9
3	(Japan) (South Korea)	Akari Midorikawa; Song Dong Ju	15; 13	12; 10	4; 11	7; 11	5; 11

=== Pool B ===
Pos.	Team	Players	TP	TW	TL	MW	ML	GW	GL	PW	PL	Pts	Qualification
1	Malaysia	Rachel Arnold, Aifa Azman, Chan Yiwen, Ainaa Amani	3	3	0	8	1	26	4	321	191	6	Semifinals
2	India	Joshna Chinappa, Sunayna Kuruvilla, Urwashi Joshi, Aparajitha Balamurukan	3	2	1	7	2	21	8	292	190	4	Semifinals
3	Iran	Ghazal Sharafpour, Fereshteh Eghtedari, Ailee Nayeri, Sogol Samoudi	3	1	2	2	7	7	21	183	273	2	5th–8th places
4	Philippines	Jemyca Aribado, Yvonne Alyssa Dalida, Lizette Reyes	3	0	3	1	8	3	24	136	278	0	5th–8th places

Malaysia
3

National Squash Complex, Court 7
30 November 2021

Iran
0

			1	2	3	4	5
1	(Malaysia) (Iran)	Rachel Arnold; Fereshteh Eghtedari	11; 5	16; 14	11; 2
2	(Malaysia) (Iran)	Chan Yiwen; Ailee Nayeri	11; 4	11; 9	11; 5
3	(Malaysia) (Iran)	Ainaa Amani; Sogol Samoudi	11; 5	11; 4	6; 11	11; 6

India
3

National Squash Complex, Court 9
30 November 2021

Philippines
0

			1	2	3	4	5
1	(India) (Philippines)	Joshna Chinappa; Jemyca Aribado	13; 11	11; 8	11; 4
2	(India) (Philippines)	Sunayna Kuruvilla; Yvonne Alyssa Dalida	11; 4	11; 2	11; 2
3	(India) (Philippines)	Urwashi Joshi; Lizette Reyes	11; 2	11; 3	11; 2

Malaysia
2

National Squash Complex, Grand Court
1 December 2021

India
1

			1	2	3	4	5
1	(Malaysia) (India)	Rachel Arnold; Joshna Chinappa	11; 9	8; 11	7; 11	11; 8	9; 11
2	(Malaysia) (India)	Aifa Azman; Sunayna Kuruvilla	11; 9	11; 4	11; 7
3	(Malaysia) (India)	Ainaa Amani; Urwashi Joshi	11; 5	11; 9	11; 8

Iran
2

National Squash Complex, Court 8
1 December 2021

Philippines
1

			1	2	3	4	5
1	(Iran) (Philippines)	Ghazal Sharafpour; Jemyca Aribado	4; 11	4; 11	4; 11
2	(Iran) (Philippines)	Fereshteh Eghtedari; Yvonne Alyssa Dalida	11; 3	11; 4	11; 6
3	(Iran) (Philippines)	Ailee Nayeri; Lizette Reyes	11; 9	11; 4	11; 5

Malaysia
3

National Squash Complex, Grand Court
2 December 2021

Philippines
0

			1	2	3	4	5
1	(Malaysia) (Philippines)	Aifa Azman; Jemyca Aribado	11; 1	11; 7	11; 8
2	(Malaysia) (Philippines)	Chan Yiwen; Yvonne Alyssa Dalida	11; 2	11; 1	11; 3
3	(Malaysia) (Philippines)	Ainaa Amani; Lizette Reyes	11; 3	11; 6	11; 3

India
3

National Squash Complex, Court 8
2 December 2021

Iran
0

			1	2	3	4	5
1	(India) (Iran)	Joshna Chinappa; Ghazal Sharafpour	11; 7	11; 2	11; 3
2	(India) (Iran)	Sunayna Kuruvilla; Fereshteh Eghtedari	11; 3	11; 8	11; 6
3	(India) (Iran)	Urwashi Joshi; Ailee Nayeri	11; 1	11; 5	11; 5

== Second round ==
=== Fifth to eighth places ===
5th-8th semifinals
5	South Korea	2
7	Philippines	0
8	Sri Lanka	0
6	Iran	2

Fifth place playoff
5	South Korea	2
6	Iran	0
Seventh place playoff
8	Sri Lanka	2
7	Philippines	1

==== 5th–8th Semifinals ====
South Korea
2

National Squash Complex, Court 7
3 December 2021

Philippines
0

			1	2	3	4	5
1	(South Korea) (Philippines)	Eum Hwa Yeong; Jemyca Aribado	11; 4	11; 5	11; 5
2	(South Korea) (Philippines)	Heo Min-gyeong; Yvonne Alyssa Dalida	11; 1	11; 5	11; 5
3	(South Korea) (Philippines)	Oh Sung Hee; Lizette Reyes						not played

Sri Lanka
0

National Squash Complex, Court 9
3 December 2021

Iran
2

			1	2	3	4	5
1	(Sri Lanka) (Iran)	Chanithma Sinaly; Fereshteh Eghtedari	6; 11	6; 11	4; 11
2	(Sri Lanka) (Iran)	Yeheni Kuruppu; Ailee Nayeri	4; 11	1; 11	11; 9	11; 13
3	(Sri Lanka) (Iran)	Fathoum Issadeen; Sogol Samoudi						not played

==== 7th place playoff ====
Philippines
1

National Squash Complex, Court 8
4 December 2021

Sri Lanka
2

			1	2	3	4	5
1	(Philippines) (Sri Lanka)	Jemyca Aribado; Chanithma Sinaly	11; 1	12; 10	11; 13	11; 8
2	(Philippines) (Sri Lanka)	Yvonne Alyssa Dalida; Ailee Nayeri	7; 11	6; 11	3; 11
3	(Philippines) (Sri Lanka)	Lizette Reyes; Fathoum Issadeen	11; 8	4; 11	5; 11	4; 11

==== 5th place playoff ====
South Korea
2

National Squash Complex, Court 8
4 December 2021

Iran
0

			1	2	3	4	5
1	(South Korea) (Iran)	Eum Hwa Yeong; Ghazal Sharafpour	11; 6	11; 9	12; 10
2	(South Korea) (Iran)	Song Dong Ju; Sogol Samoudi	11; 9	11; 5	11; 3
3	(South Korea) (Iran)	Heo Min-gyeong; Fereshteh Eghtedari						not played

=== Knockout stage ===
Semifinals
1	Hong Kong	2
3	India	1
4	Japan	1
2	Malaysia	2

Finals
1	Hong Kong	1
2	Malaysia	2

==== Semifinals ====
Hong Kong
2

National Squash Complex, Grand Court
3 December 2021

India
1

			1	2	3	4	5
1	(Hong Kong) (India)	Liu Tsz Ling; Joshna Chinappa	11; 9	5; 11	7; 11	5; 11
2	(Hong Kong) (India)	Ho Tze Lok; Sunayna Kuruvilla	9; 11	11; 7	11; 4	11; 8
3	(Hong Kong) (India)	Tong Tsz Wing; Urwashi Joshi	12; 10	11; 4	11; 6

Japan
1

National Squash Complex, Grand Court
3 December 2021

Malaysia
2

			1	2	3	4	5
1	(Japan) (Malaysia)	Satomi Watanabe; Rachel Arnold	11; 5	11; 2	11; 4
2	(Japan) (Malaysia)	Risa Sugimoto; Aifa Azman	4; 11	4; 11	5; 11
3	(Japan) (Malaysia)	Rafu Takahashi; Ainaa Amani	3; 11	2; 11	5; 11

==== Finals ====
Hong Kong
1

National Squash Complex, Grand Court
4 December 2021

Malaysia
2

			1	2	3	4	5
1	(Hong Kong) (Malaysia)	Liu Tsz Ling; Rachel Arnold	6; 11	11; 8	7; 11	2; 11
2	(Hong Kong) (Malaysia)	Tong Tsz Wing; Ainaa Amani	11; 8	11; 6	6; 11	11; 9
3	(Hong Kong) (Malaysia)	Ho Tze Lok; Aifa Azman	4; 11	3; 11	6; 11

== Final rankings ==
Position	Team
1st place, gold medalist(s)	Malaysia
2nd place, silver medalist(s)	Hong Kong
3rd place, bronze medalist(s)	India
3rd place, bronze medalist(s)	Japan
5th	South Korea
6th	Iran
7th	Sri Lanka
8th	Philippines

Draws:

Matches:

Players:

Result:

== See also ==
- Asian Team Squash Championships
- 2021 Men's Asian Team Squash Championships

Preceded by Cheongju; 2018	Asian Team Squash Championships; Malaysia (Kuala Lumpur); 2021	Succeeded by Asian Championships; 2022
