= Anaka Alankamony =

Indian squash player (born 1994)

Personal information
- Full name: Anaka Alankamony
- Born: 10 July 1994 (age 32) Chennai, India

Sport
- Country: India
- Handedness: Squash
- Turned pro: 2009
- Highest ranking: 59 (June 2010)
- Current ranking: 241 (December 2015)
Medal record
Women's squash
Representing India
Asian Games
Silver medal – second place	2014 Incheon	Team
Bronze medal – third place	2010 Guangzhou	Team
- Updated on May 2017

Anaka Alankamony (born 10 July 1994) is an Indian squash player. She held a career-high world ranking of 59 in 2010 and won the Arjuna Award, the second-highest sporting honour of India, in 2014.

== Education ==
She was a student of Sri Sivasubramaniya Nadar College of Engineering and a former student of Sacred Heart Matriculation Higher Secondary School Chennai.

Anaka enrolled at the University of Pennsylvania in Philadelphia in the fall of 2013. At University of Pennsylvania, she played on the women's squash team and studied Computer Science and Economics in the College of Arts and Sciences. Her studies in the United States were touted as a reason for her low participation in tournaments and slipping rank in the World Squash Rankings.

== Career ==
Anaka's first big win was at the Asian U-15 circuit at just 13 years of age. She then set the world record at the age of 15 as the youngest person in the world to earn the WISPA title in 2009. Malaysia's Nicol David had earlier won the title at the age of 16. Anaka was the second Indian, after Joshna Chinappa to win the WISPA title. She won the same title for the second time in 2012.

She was awarded the Young Achiever Award by Rotary Club of Madras Northwest.

In 2008, she was crowned the Asian Junior Squash Individual Champion in 2008 in Korea.

Anaka won a bronze medal (team) at the 2010 Asian Games, Guangzhou and a Silver medal (team) at the 2014 Asian Games, Incheon.

Anaka won The Arjuna Award 2014 for her achievements in squash, as the government also felt that it was important to promote women squash players. However, this Award was mired in controversy after senior squash players from the country felt that she had not yet done enough in the professional circuit to deserve the award, especially because her rank had slipped from her career high 59 in 2009 to 151 in 2014.

Anaka has receded from the professional circuit.
