= 2017 Men's British Open Squash Championship =

British Open
- Men's British Open

Details
- Event name: Allam British Open 2017
- Location: Hull, England
- Venue: Airco Arena
- Dates: 19–26 March 2017

Men's Winner
- Category: World Series
- Prize money: $150,000
- Year: World Tour 2017

The Men's Allam British Open 2017 is the men's edition of the 2017 British Open Squash Championships, which is a PSA World Series event (Prize money : 150,000 $). The event took place at the Airco Arena in Hull in England from 19–26 March 2017. Grégory Gaultier won his third British Open trophy, beating Nick Matthew in the final.

== Seeds ==
1. (Egypt) Mohamed El Shorbagy
2. (Egypt) Karim Abdel Gawad
3. (France) Grégory Gaultier
4. (England) Nick Matthew
5. (Egypt) Ramy Ashour
6. (Egypt) Marwan El Shorbagy
7. (Egypt) Ali Farag
8. (Egypt) Tarek Momen

== Draw and results ==
First round
1	(Egypt) Mohd El Shorbagy	11	10	11	8	11
(Egypt) Fares Dessouky	8	12	7	11	8
(England) Daryl Selby	11	10	9	11	11
(England) Tom Richards	9	12	11	1	6
(South Africa) Stephen Coppinger	6	0	ret inj
(Hong Kong) Tsz Fung Yip	11	6	w/o
7	(Egypt) Ali Farag	11	11	9	11
(Australia) Ryan Cuskelly	9	1	11	1
8	(Egypt) Tarek Momen	11	11	11
(Scotland) Alan Clyne	7	8	3
(New Zealand) Paul Coll	9	11	9	11	11
(England) Declan James	11	8	11	2	5
(Germany) Simon Rösner	11	11	11
(France) Grégoire Marche	3	4	8
(Spain) Borja Golán	9	6	3
4	(England) Nick Matthew	11	11	11
3	(France) Grégory Gaultier	11	11	11
(Colombia) Miguel Á. Rodríguez	5	4	0
(England) Adrian Waller	6	5	6
(Australia) Cameron Pilley	11	11	11
(France) Mathieu Castagnet	11	10	12	11
(England) James Willstrop	9	12	10	9
(Hong Kong) Max Lee	5	7	11	11	11
6	(Egypt) Marwan El Shorbagy	11	11	5	6	6
5	(Egypt) Ramy Ashour	11	11	11
(Egypt) Zahed Mohamed	4	6	5
(England) Nathan Lake	7	11	1	6
(Peru) Diego Elías	11	8	11	11
(Egypt) Mohamed Abouelghar	11	5	11	11
(England) Charles Sharples	3	11	5	6
(Egypt) Omar Mosaad	11	11	2	11	6
2	(Egypt) Karim Abdel Gawad	13	6	11	5	11

Second round
1	(Egypt) El Shorbagy	11	9	8	12	11
(England) Selby	8	11	11	10	5
(Hong Kong) Tsz Fung Yip	8	2	9
7	(Egypt) Farag	11	11	1
8	(Egypt) Momen	11	11	20
(New Zealand) Coll	6	9	18
(Germany) Rösner	7	5	11	3
4	(England) Matthew	11	11	5	11
3	(France) Gaultier	11	11	11
(Australia) Pilley	1	3	1
(France) Castagnet	12	11	11
(Hong Kong) Lee	10	8	8
5	(Egypt) Ashour	11	11	11
(Peru) Elías	9	6	10
(Egypt) Abouelghar	11	10	11	11
2	(Egypt) Gawad	6	12	9	7

Quarter finals
1	(Egypt) El Shorbagy	11	9	8	12	11
7	(Egypt) Farag	8	11	11	10	5
8	(Egypt) Momen	9	12	6	11	6
4	(England) Matthew	11	10	11	7	11
3	(France) Gaultier	11	11	11
(France) Castagnet	4	6	6
5	(Egypt) Ashour	10	7	11	11	11
(Egypt) Abouleghar	12	11	9	5	5

Semi-finals
1	(Egypt) El Shorbagy	8	8	11	5
4	(England) Matthew	11	11	8	11
Final
4	(England) Matthew	11	7	3	3
3	(France) Gaultier	8	11	11	11
3	(France) Gaultier	11	w/o
5	(Egypt) Ashour	9	ret inj

== See also ==
- 2017 Women's British Open Squash Championship
- 2017 Men's World Open Squash Championship
