= Chanithma Sinaly =

Sri Lankan squash player

Personal information
- Full name: Veera Samiyel Chanithma Sinaly
- Born: Colombo, Western Province, Sri Lanka
- Height: 161 cm (5 ft 3 in)
- Weight: 54 kg (119 lb)

Sport
- Country: Sri Lanka
- Handedness: right-handed
- Highest ranking: 161 (November 2023)
- Current ranking: 161 (November 2023)

Veera Samiyel Chanithma Sinaly is a Sri Lankan professional squash player. She is also the current national champion in women's singles in the sport of squash. She achieved her highest career PSA world rankings of 161 in November 2023.

== Biography ==
She pursued her primary and secondary education at the Sirimavo Bandaranaike Vidyalaya, where she was appointed as the Deputy Head Prefect. She is coached by her father Mahesh Chandana.

== Career ==
She was selected for 2019 Asian Junior Squash Team Championship which was held in Thailand. She was named in Sri Lankan squad for the 2021 Women's Asian Team Squash Championships. In December 2022, she clinched the women's open title defeating Fathoum Issadeen in the final of the 42nd Squash Senior Nationals which was played at the Singhalese Sports Club and it was also Chanithma's first national title win. She was adjudged the winner of the Girls Under-19 category at the 33rd Junior National Squash Championship in 2022. She also won the Girls Under-19 title at the inaugural edition of the Yeti Open Junior Squash Championship in 2022. She represented Sri Lanka at the 2022 Commonwealth Games, which also marked her debut appearance at the Commonwealth Games. She competed in the women's singles, women's doubles and mixed doubles competitions during the 2022 Commonwealth Games. She won the Girls Under-17 plate championship at the 2022 Asian Junior Individual Squash Championships.

In 2023, she won the women's open title during the Sri Lanka Air Force Open Squash Tournament which was held at the Ratmalana Air Force Base. She was also included in Sri Lankan contingent for the 2023 Asian Junior Team Squash Championship. She has occasionally missed out on competing at overseas international squash competitions such as the 2023 Hong Kong Championship owing to financial constraints. She represented Sri Lanka at the 2022 Asian Games and it also marked her maiden appearance at the Asian Games. During the 2022 Asian Games, she competed in the mixed doubles event collaborating with Shamil Wakeel.
