= Ayesha Gulalai =

Pakistani politician

Member of the National Assembly of Pakistan
- In office 1 June 2013 – 31 May 2018
- Constituency: Reserved seat for women
- Constituency: Reserved seat for women

Personal details
- Party: PML(Q) (2023–present)
- Other political affiliations: PTI (2012–2017); PPP (2008–2012); APML (2008–2012); Pakistan Tehreek-e-Insaf-Gulalai (2018–2023)
- Relatives: Maria Toorpakay (sister)

Ayesha Gulalai Wazir (Pashto: عایشه ګلالۍ وزیر Urdu: عائشہ گلالئی وزیر) is a Pakistani politician who served as a Member of the National Assembly of Pakistan from June 2013 to May 2018.

== Early life and education ==
Ayesha Gulalai was born in Domel and received her M.Phil degree in Islamic Studies with Major in Comparative Religion from the University of Peshawar.

After graduating, she briefly worked as a journalist at English Daily The News International. She also remained the chairperson of Tribal Union of Journalists and information secretary of FATA Reforms Committee. She is the sister of Maria Toorpakay.

== Political career ==
Wazir began her political career as a human rights activist from Bannu domel. She was a worker of Pakistan Peoples Party Parliamentarians (PPPP) as coordinator for the women's wing in Federally Administered Tribal Areas. She also has been a member of the All Pakistan Muslim League (APML). It was reported that PPPP was considering to give her a party ticket in the 2008 Pakistani general election to run for the seat of National Assembly, but she could not compete due to the restriction on the issue of age.

In 2012, she joined Pakistan Tehreek-e-Insaf (PTI) and was nominated as a member of the PTI central committee. Wazir was indirectly elected to the National Assembly of Pakistan as a candidate of PTI on a reserved seat for women from the FATA in the 2013 Pakistani general election. She became the first-ever female Member of the National Assembly from FATA as well one of the youngest members of the parliament.

She quit PTI in August 2017, accusing that the party does not guarantee respect and dignity to women. She has blamed Imran Khan for inappropriate text messages sent to her in October 2013. She also refused to resign from the seat in the National Assembly.

In February 2018, she launched her own party Pakistan Tehreek-e-Insaf (Gulalai) (PTI-G), as a faction of PTI. The election commission of Pakistan allotted the racket as an electoral sign to PTI-G. The party supports presidential form of democracy.

For the 2018 Pakistani general election, PTI-G gave tickets to four transgender persons to contest elections.

Wazir ran for the seat of the National Assembly as a candidate of PTI-G from Constituency NA-25 (Nowshera-I), Constituency NA-53 (Islamabad-II), Constituency NA-161 (Lodhran-II) and from Constituency NA-231 (Sujawal) in 2018 Pakistani general election but was unsuccessful and lost from all four seats.

In May 2019, Gulalai asked Bilawal Bhutto Zardari to merge his party (PPP) with PTI-G as she thought it had already been reduced to one province.

In the 2018 General Elections, PTI-G could only secure 4,130 votes in National Assembly and 1,235 in Provincial Assembly. None of the party's candidates were able to win in any constituency.

On 25 May 2023, she joined PML-Q in a press conference.
