= Sirimavo Bandaranaike Vidyalaya =

Public school in Colombo, Sri Lanka

- සිරිමාවෝ බණ්ඩාරනායක විද්‍යාලය කොළඹ 7 சிறிமாவொ பண்டாறநாயக்க வித்தியாலயம்
- Sirimavo bandaranaike vidyalaya

Location
- Stanmore Crescent; Colombo 7, Sri lanka, Western province, 00700; Sri Lanka; 6°53′52″N 79°51′45″E

Information
- Former name: Stanmore Crescent Primary School
- School type: National school
- Motto: Sinhala: උගනිමු හැදෙමු සැනසෙමු Uganimu Hademu Sanasemu (Learn, achieve and bliss)
- Religious affiliation: Buddhism
- Established: 1 January 1973; 53 years ago
- Founder: Wimala Liyanage
- Status: Prominent girls' school in Sri lanka
- School district: Colombo
- Category: National school
- Principal: Sumedha Jayaweera
- Staff: 200
- Grades: 1–13
- Primary years taught: 1st to 5th grade
- Secondary years taught: 6th to 13th grade
- Gender: Girls
- Age range: 6–19
- Enrollment: 4,000+
- Education system: National Education System
- Language: Sinhala, Tamil, English
- Hours in school day: 07:30–13:30
- Houses: Kokila,Mayura,Hansa,Paravi
- Colours: Pink and blue
- Song: Sinhala: සැරදේ සැරදේ විදුහල් මව'පේ Sarade sarade viduhal mavape (Long live our alma mater)
- Athletics: Yes
- Publication: The Student Gazette
- Affiliation: Buddhist
- Alumni: Sirimavians
- Website: sirimavo.lk

Sirimavo Bandaranaike Vidyalaya (Sinhala: සිරිමාවෝ බණ්ඩාරනායක විද්‍යාලය, Tamil: சிறிமாவோ பண்டாறநாயக்க வித்தியாலயம்) is a public girls' school in Colombo, Sri Lanka. It is a Buddhist National public school controlled by the central government, provide primary and secondary education.

== Overview ==
The school was inaugurated on 1 January 1973 as Stanmore Crescent Primary School and renamed in December 1973 as Sirimavo Bandaranaike Primary Girls School in honor of Prime Minister Sirimavo Bandaranaike. From a primary school, the school developed into a secondary school and finally to a national school within seventeen years.

At present, the school has over 3,000 students and a staff of about 180 including approximately 45 members of the non-academic staff.

== History ==
The site donated by the government for the eshtablishment of the school in 1972

Sirimavo Bandaranaike Vidyalaya was inaugurated on 1 January 1973, as Stanmore Crescent Primary School with five teachers and 149 students under the guidance of Wimala Liyanage, the founding principal. The school's name was "Stanmore Crescent Primary School" and consisted of classes up to grade five.

After eleven months of deliberation, the Deputy Minister of Education, B. Y. Tudawe, suggested to change the name of the school in honour of Prime Minister Sirimavo Bandaranaike.

After the initial batch of students finished five years of primary education, classes had to be extended to provide secondary education and in due course classes up to Year 13 were established. Due to the patronage of former principals Wimala Liyanage (1973–1982), and R. M. L. Jayasekera (1982–2000) the status of the school was raised to level of a National School in 1991. Under the guidance of W. P. N. de Silva (2000–2003) the school's academic and co-curricular activities were further developed.

On 6 November 2003 P. M. Kalubowila assumed duties as the principal, having joined Sirimavo Bandaranaike Vidyalaya in 1986 as a Chemistry teacher. Kalubowila has dedicated herself to serve the school in the sphere of educational and co-curricular activities and to upgrade the infra-structure facilities and resources development of the school.

In July 2009, Kalubowila ordered all students to shut down their Facebook profiles, with a threat of expulsion from school for disobedience. This sparked a controversy in the school system in Sri Lanka. After the retirement of Kalubowila in February 2012, the principal was Dhammika C. Jayaneththi. Malini Herath was appointed as principal in 2013 and she is class 1 in Sri Lanka Education Administrative Service.

== School anthem ==
සැරදේ සැරදේ විදුහල් මව'පේ //
සිරිමාවෝ බණ්ඩාරනායක විදුහල් මව සැරදේ

මෙදෙස මෙබස ගැන සිත පොළඹා
දෑ හැඟුමන් සැම විට මොළවා //
මව්නි ඔබෙන් ලද උණුසුම විඳ විඳ
පෙරට ඇදෙමු ජය කෙහෙළි නගා

== Past principals ==
- Wimala Liyanage (1973–1982)
- R. M. L. Jayasekera (1982–2000)
- W. P. N. De Silva (2000–2003)
- P. M. Kalubowila (2003—2012)
- R. M. Herath (2014—2023)
- Sumedha Jayaweera (2023—present)

== Achievements ==
The students of Sirimavo Bandaranaike Vidyalaya have accomplished the following achievements in many national and international events.

Year	Event	Category	Title/Place won	Winners
2019	State Children's Drama Festival	Drama	1st place	Jayani Kapuge Danushika Nayanakumari
2018	International Quality circles	Drama	1st place- Skit presentation	
2016	National Aquatic Championships	Swimming	Gold medal for 400m freestyle relay	
2014	Inter School Best Speaker Contest	Public Speaking	1st Runner Up - Senior Category	Sajani Senanayake
2014	Inter School Best Speaker Contest	Public Speaking	1st Place - Junior Category	Rosara Dayaratne
2013	2013 Asian Youth Games	Squash	Bronze medal for Squash	Mihiliya Methsarani
2012	Indian Junior Squash Championship	Squash	Gold medal	Mihiliya Methsarani

== Clubs and societies ==
More than 30 clubs and societies are available. Every club and society has a member of the teaching staff overseeing things and helping with administration and organising events.

- Agriculture Society
- Astronomical Society
- Aviation Society
- Buddhist Society
- Catholic Society
- Career Guidance and Skills Society
- Commerce Society
- Disaster Management Unit
- Domestic Science Society
- Drama Unit English
- Drug Abuse Prevention Society
- Elocution and Debating Society
- English Literary Association
- Environmental Society

- French Club
- Gavel Club
- General Knowledge Society
- Girl Guides and Little Friends Society
- Global Friends Club
- Good Friends Society
- Information Technology Society
- Islamic Society
- Japanese Language Society
- Law Circle
- Leaders Foundation
- Media Unit
- Novel Invention Society
- Oriental Music Society

- Philatelic Club
- Photographic Society
- Practical Technology Skills Society
- Print Media Unit
- Ran-Kekulu Savings Foundation
- Science-Mathematics Society
- Security and Traffic Warden Society
- Sinhala Literature Association
- Sisu-Udana Society
- Society of Fine Arts
- Teachers Welfare Society
- UNESCO Society
- Western Music Society
- Quality Circle

== Sports ==
- Athletics
- Badminton
- Basketball
- Carrom
- Cricket
- Chess
- Gymnastic
- Hockey
- Netball
- Physical Training
- Rowing
- Squash
- Swimming
- Table Tennis
- Throwball
- Volleyball
- Soccer
- Scrabble
- Rifle Shooting

== Infrastructure facilities (recent and ongoing projects) ==
School library

The school library was set up in 1982 with the assistance of the Sri Lanka Library Services Board. In 1996, a program titled "Library Week" was inaugurated during the "Reading Month". Library facilities are provided to all the pupils of the school and there are two libraries separately; one for Primary Grades and other for seniors. A reference section and a lending library section function and about 250 students are benefit daily from the lending library section. Books are issued on a daily basis to advanced level students and on the recommendation of teachers in charge books are provided to pupils taking part in "Do You Know "contests and debating teams. The strength of the library is about 15000 books. Magazine section has been organized to improve the General Knowledge of the students.

Construction of a new state of the art library complex is in progress.

Swimming Pool

SBV Swimming Pool was ceremonially opened by the first lady of Sri Lanka, Mrs. Shiranthi Rajapaksa on 28 October 2008. Principal of the school Ms Pushpa Kalubowila, Education Minister Susil Premjayanth and Sports Minister Gamini Lokuge were associated with the First Lady at the opening ceremony.

A swimming pool was a long felt need of the Sirimavians. Many problems arose in attending training sessions in other pools specially transport problems and supervision. As such a strong request was made by the students to commence work on a school swimming pool. As a result, the foundation for the school swimming pool was laid in October 2006. Many projects were launched to raise funds for the project. Swimming pool project was completed in 2 years time and that was considered as an achievement. Swimming Pool caters to the long felt need of the Sirimavians and foster the advancements in the sphere of sports.

Swimming pool facilities are open to all present and past Sirimavians, Teachers and the community.

== Notable alumni ==
- Mihiliya Methsarani - Squash player
- Chanithma Sinaly - Squash player
