= Tan Yan Xin =

Malaysian squash player (born 1993)

Personal information
- Born: 13 June 1993 (age 33) Kuala Lumpur, Malaysia

Sport
- Country: Malaysia
- Handedness: Right Handed
- Turned pro: 2007
- Coached by: Ajaz Asmat
- Retired: Active
- Racquet used: Prince

Women's singles
- Highest ranking: No. 69 (March 2009)
- Current ranking: No. 91 (December 2009)
- Updated on 22 December 2009

Tan Yan Xin (born 13 June 1993 in Kuala Lumpur) is a Malaysian professional squash player. She attended Bukit Jalil Sports School and was a Scottish Junior Open champion in the girls' under-11 event in 2003. She reached a career-high world ranking of World No. 69 in March 2009.
