= Waqar Mehboob =

Pakistani squash player (born 1991)

Personal information
- Born: 15 November 1991 (age 34) Peshawar, Pakistan
- Height: 1.30 m (4 ft 3 in)
- Weight: 45 kg (99 lb)

Sport
- Country: Pakistan
- Turned pro: 2006
- Coached by: Mehboob Khan
- Retired: Active
- Racquet used: Dunlop

Men's singles
- Highest ranking: No. 67 (November 2009)
- Current ranking: No. 82 (December 2009)
- Updated on 22 December 2009

Waqar Mehboob (Urdu: وقار محبوب; born 15 November 1991 in Peshawar) is a professional squash player who represented Pakistan. He reached a career-high world ranking of World No. 67 in November 2009.
