= Siti Munirah Jusoh =

Malaysian squash player (born 1987)

Personal information
- Born: 25 May 1987 (age 39) Terengganu, Malaysia

Sport
- Country: Malaysia
- Handedness: Right Handed
- Turned pro: 2005
- Coached by: Ahmed Malik
- Racquet used: Dunlop

Women's singles
- Highest ranking: No. 33 (October 2012)
- Title: 1
- Tour final: 8
Medal record
Women's squash
Representing Malaysia
World Team Championships
Bronze medal – third place	2012 Nîmes	Team
- Updated on November 2013

Siti Munirah Jusoh (born 25 May 1987 in Terengganu) is a former professional squash player who represented Malaysia. She reached a career-high world ranking of World No. 33 in October 2012. She was coached by Ahmed Malik, a professional squash coach formerly from Pakistan.

== Career ==
In 2012, she was part of the Malaysian team that won the bronze medal at the 2012 Women's World Team Squash Championships.
