= Kamran Khan (squash player) =

Malaysian squash player (born 1990)

Personal information
- Born: 22 February 1990 (age 36) England
- Height: 1.81 m (5 ft 11 in)
- Weight: 72 kg (159 lb)

Sport
- Country: Malaysia
- Handedness: Left Handed
- Turned pro: 2007
- Coached by: Ajaz Azmat; Kenneth Low
- Retired: 2013
- Racquet used: Dunlop

Men's singles
- Highest ranking: No. 58 (June 2012)
- Title: 2
- Tour final: 6
- Updated on July 2020

Kamran Khan (born 22 February 1990 in England) is a professional squash player who represented Malaysia. He reached a career-high world ranking of World No. 56 in January 2010.

He is of Pashtun descent and the son to Jansher Khan, the former world No. 1 professional Pakistani squash player. His Malaysian mother divorced his father and brought Kamran back from Pakistan to Malaysia to make a living.
