= Sports Arena, Kingston upon Hull =

Sports venue

Sports Arena
- Tigers Trust Arena
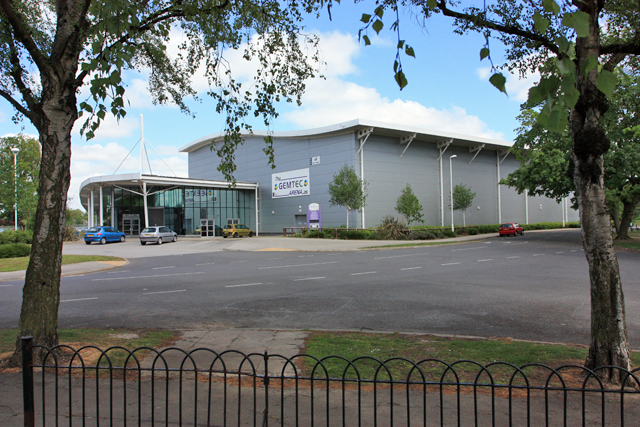
- Interactive map of Sports Arena
- Former names: Airco Arena; Bonus Arena; Gemtec Arena; Vulcan Arena
- Address: Walton Street, Hull, England HU3 6JP
- Location: Walton Street, Hull, England HU3 6JP
- Coordinates: 53.74742°N 0.37290°W
- Type: arena

The Sports Arena, also known as the Tigers Trust Arena (formerly the Airco Arena, the Bonus Arena, Gemtec Arena and the Vulcan Arena) is a sports centre located next to the MKM Stadium in Kingston upon Hull, East Riding of Yorkshire, England.

The arena was built at the same time as the KC Stadium and is a multisport arena used by many people in and around Hull. It is used by many of the city's schools, colleges and universities and is a popular place for association football or other sport tournaments to take place, including The Tigers 5-A-Side Tournament. It is also used for many other events such as Fares and Model Shows such as the Fairground model show. Until 2012 it was also the home for the NBL Division 4 basketball team, the Hull Wasps. However, the Wasps moved to the Ennerdale Lesure Centre before the 2012–13 season citing the increase charges for use of the Sports Arena as the main reason. The 2013–14 season will see the return of NBL basketball to the Sports Arena as the home the Kingston Panthers. It is also an accredited handball facility.

The main hall of the arena is 54 metres (177 ft) x 33 metres (108 ft) with a height of 9 metres (30 ft).

The venue is frequently used for shows by acclaimed wrestling promotion New Generation Wrestling.
