= Zulhijjah Binti Azan =

Malaysian squash player (born 1990)

Personal information
- Born: 12 July 1990 (age 36) Selangor, Malaysia

Sport
- Country: Malaysia
- Handedness: Right-handed
- Turned pro: 2007
- Coached by: Ahmed Malik
- Racquet used: Prince

Women's singles
- Highest ranking: No. 63 (November 2013)
Medal record
Women's squash
Representing Malaysia
World Team Championships
| Silver medal – second place | 2014 Niagara-on-the Lake | Team |
- Updated on 1 September 2024

Zulhijjah Binti Azan (born 12 July 1990 in Selangor) is a professional squash player who represents Malaysia. She reached a career-high world ranking of World No. 63 in November 2013.

== Career ==
In 2014, she was part of the Malaysian team that won the silver medal at the 2014 Women's World Team Squash Championships.

== Personal life ==
In 2015 she married Malaysian professional cricketer Syazrul Idrus.
