= Joshna Chinappa =

Indian squash player (born 1986)

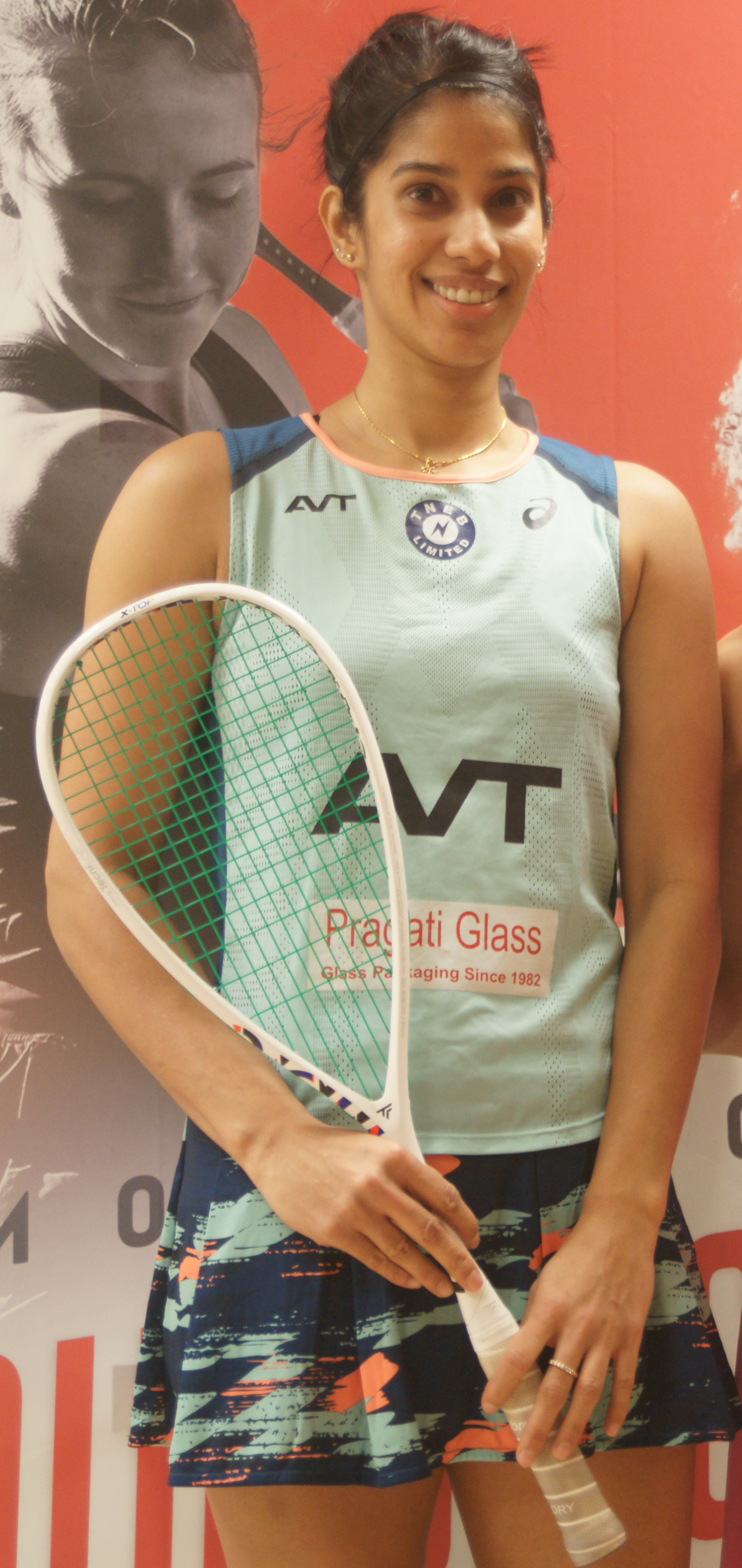
- Joshna at the 2024 Monte Carlo Classic

Personal information
- Born: 15 September 1986 (age 40) Chennai, Tamil Nadu, India
- Height: 1.73 m (5 ft 8 in)

Sport
- Country: India
- Turned pro: 2003
- Racquet used: Tecnifibre

Women's singles
- Highest ranking: 10 (July 2016)
- Current ranking: 79 (December 2025)
- Title: 10
- Tour final: 18
- PSA Profile
Medal record
Women's squash
Representing India
Event	1st	2nd	3rd
World Championships	2	0	3
World Cup	1	0	1
Asian Games	0	2	4
Asian Championships	4	0	2
Commonwealth Games	1	1	0
South Asian Games	6	0	0
World Junior Championships	0	1	0
Total	14	4	10
World Championships
Gold medal – first place	2022 Glasgow	Doubles
Gold medal – first place	2024 Glasgow	Doubles
Bronze medal – third place	2016 Darwin	Doubles
Bronze medal – third place	2016 Darwin	Mixed doubles
Bronze medal – third place	2017 Manchester	Doubles
World Cup
Gold medal – first place	2025 Chennai	Mixed team
Bronze medal – third place	2023 Chennai	Mixed team
Asian Games
Silver medal – second place	2014 Incheon	Team
Silver medal – second place	2018 Jakarta	Team
Bronze medal – third place	2010 Guangzhou	Team
Bronze medal – third place	2018 Jakarta	Singles
Bronze medal – third place	2022 Hangzhou	Team
Bronze medal – third place	2026 Aichi–Nagoya	Mixed team
Asian Championships
Gold medal – first place	2017 Chennai	Singles
Gold medal – first place	2019 Kuala Lumpur	Singles
Gold medal – first place	2024 Johor	Mixed doubles
Gold medal – first place	2025 Kuala Lumpur	Doubles
Bronze medal – third place	2021 Kuala Lumpur	Team
Bronze medal – third place	2025 Kuala Lumpur	Mixed doubles
Commonwealth Games
Gold medal – first place	2014 Glasgow	Doubles
Silver medal – second place	2018 Gold Coast	Doubles
South Asian Games
Gold medal – first place	2004 Islamabad	Singles
Gold medal – first place	2004 Islamabad	Team
Gold medal – first place	2006 Colombo	Singles
Gold medal – first place	2006 Colombo	Team
Gold medal – first place	2016 Guwahati	Singles
Gold medal – first place	2016 Guwahati	Team
World Junior Championships
Silver medal – second place	2005 Herentals	Singles

Joshna Chinappa (born 15 September 1986) is an Indian squash player. She became the youngest Indian national champion at the age of 14. She is a two-time World Champion and four-time Asian Champion. In recognition of her contributions to Indian squash, Joshna received the Arjuna Award in 2013 and the Padma Shri in 2024. She took part in her seventh consecutive Asian Games at the 2026 edition at Nagoya, the most by any Indian.

== Early life ==
Joshna Chinnappa was born in Chennai, Tamil Nadu, on 15 September 1986. Her father Anjan Chinappa runs a coffee plantation at Coorg. Her great granduncle, K.M. Cariappa, who was the first commander-in-chief of the Indian Army in independent India, grandfather, and father were all squash players. Joshna started playing squash at the age of seven. When she was eight, she considered whether to pursue badminton or tennis. Eventually, she chose squash which she started playing at the Madras Cricket Club. Her father, who represented the Tamil Nadu squash team, was also her first coach.

Joshna was the first beneficiary of the Mittal Champions Trust established by Mahesh Bhupati with funding from Lakshmi Mittal.

== Career ==
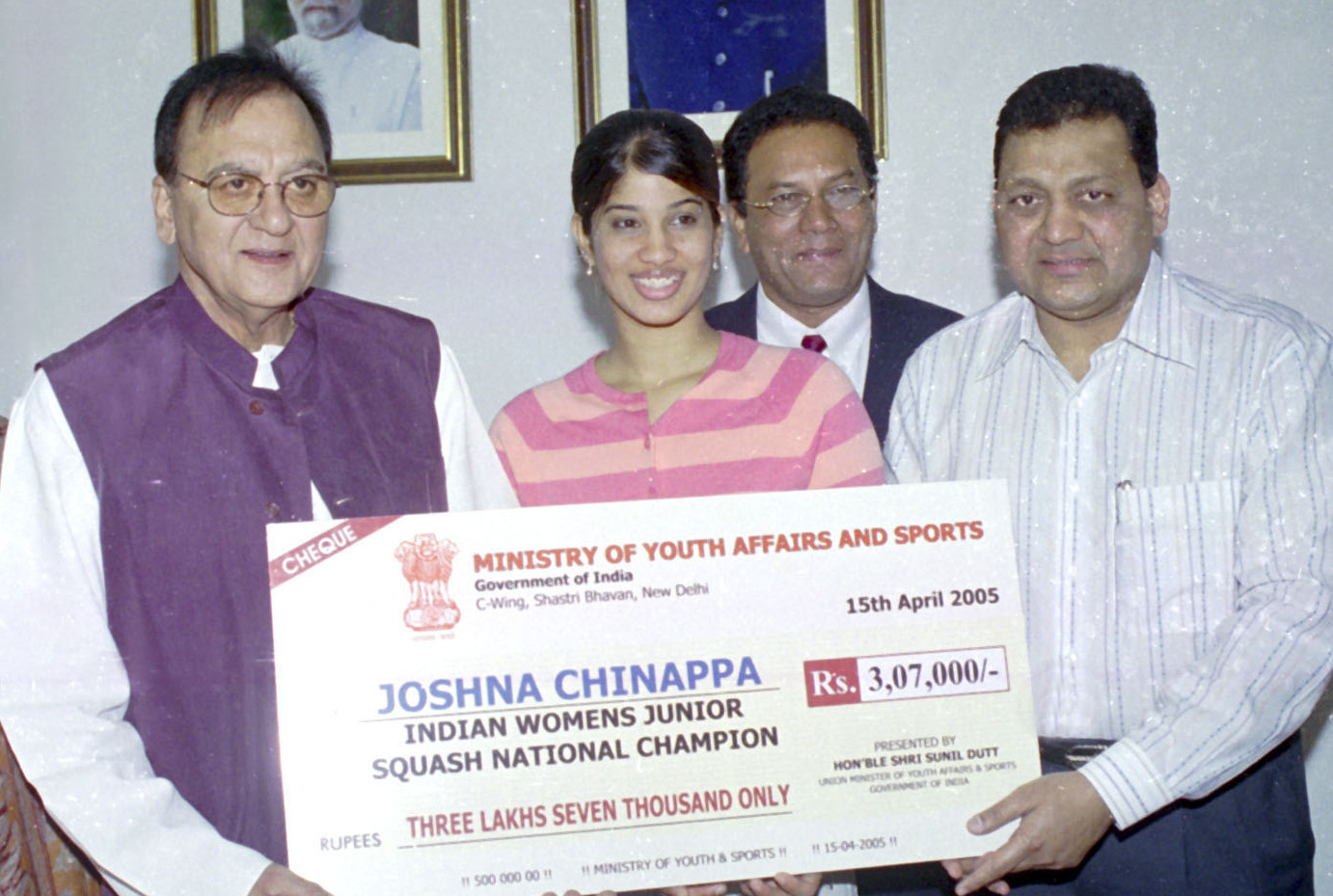
Joshna receiving a prize from Sunil Dutt, Minister for Youth Affairs and Sports, after winning the 2005 British Junior Open

=== 2000–2008 ===
In 2000, Joshna won her first junior and senior national championship titles. She became the youngest player to hold both titles at the age of 14. In 2003, Joshna made history by winning the British Junior Open title in the U17 category when she was 16. The next year, she reached the final of the U19 category of the same competition, losing to Egypt's Omneya Abdel Kawy. In 2005, she came back to the same tournament again and clinched the title after beating Tenille Swartz of South Africa. In July 2005, Joshna competed in the World Junior Squash Championships in Belgium, reaching the finals. She was defeated by Raneem El Weleily of Egypt. She had also played this tournament in 2003, when she reached the last eight.

In 2007, Joshna said that she had decided to change coaches from Mohammad Medhaat to Malcolm Willstrop. Joshna won her first WISPA tour title in 2008 when she won the NSC Super Satellite No 3 in Malaysia, by beating Low Wee Wern. The following week, she defeated Wern again in the NSC Super Satellite to claim her second tour title. At this time, she was at her career best PSA World rank of 39.

=== 2010–2012 ===
In 2010, Joshna won the German Ladies Open, beating Gaby Schmohl 11–6, 11–7, 11–6 at Saarbrücken. This was her fourth tour title and first in Europe. In 2011, she won the Windy City Open by beating her compatriot Dipika Pallikal 3–2 in the final.

Joshna faced an injury layoff in August while playing in the Hamptons Open. When she came back after a seven-month break in May 2012, she clinched the WISPA title in the 2012 Chennai Open in her hometown. Joshna defeated Sarah Jane Perry of England 9–11, 11–4, 11–8, 12–10.

=== 2014 ===
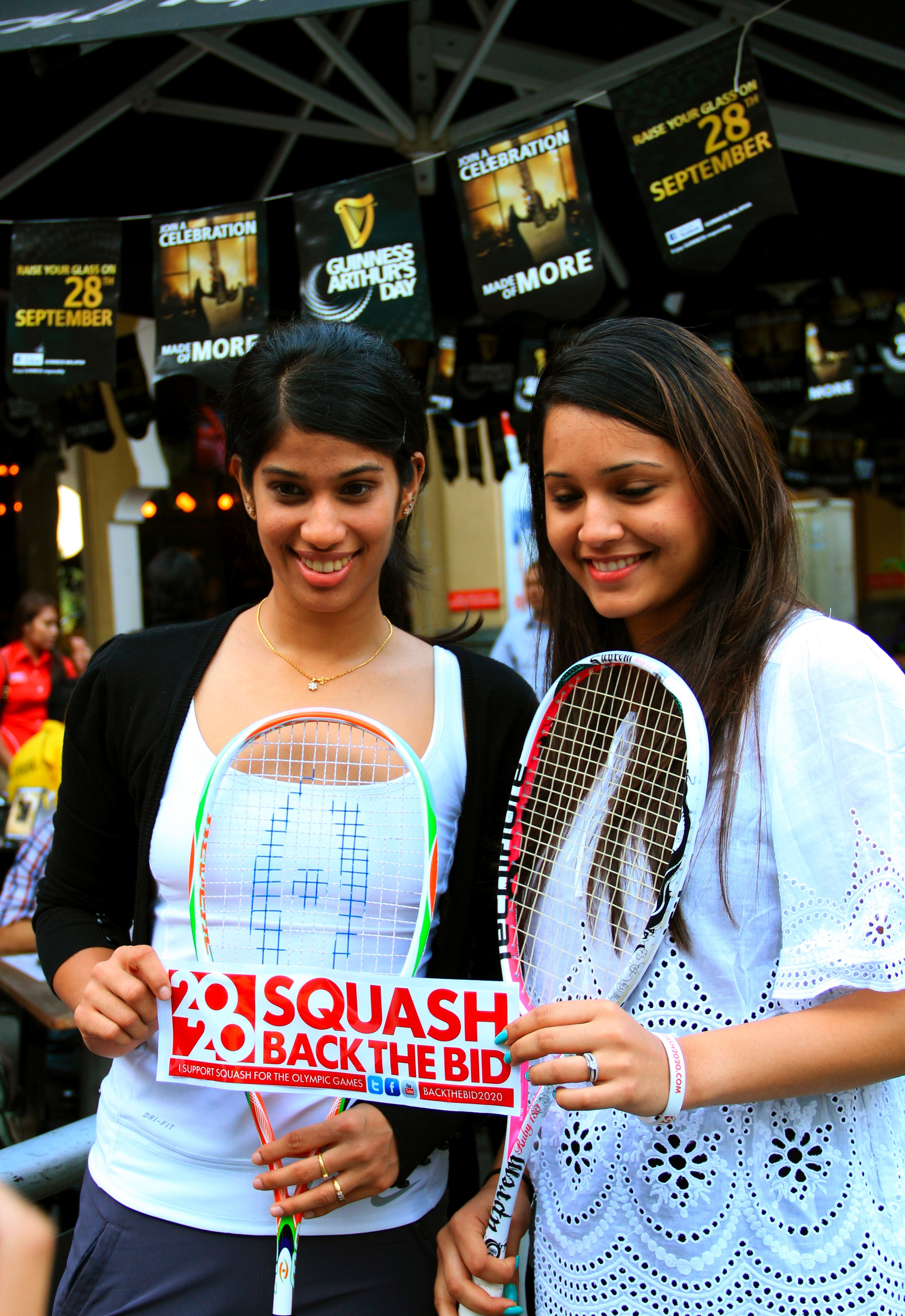
Joshna with Dipika Pallikal

In February, Joshna won the Winter Club Women's Open. In April, she won the Richmond Open, upsetting Australia's former world champion Rachael Grinham 11–9, 11–5, 11–8. This was her first win against Rachael in six meetings. In March, she reached her new career-high PSA world ranking of 19.

In August, Joshna and Dipika entered the 2014 Commonwealth Games in Glasgow as the fifth-seeds in women's doubles. After winning every match in the group stage, they advanced to quarterfinals, in which they beat Joelle King and Amanda Land-Murphy in straight games. They beat the second-seeded Australian pair of Rachael Grinham and Kasey Brown in the semifinals to reach the final, where they defeated the English pair of Jenny Duncalf and Laura Massaro. They accomplished the upset win against the top-seeded pair in less than 28 minutes with scores of 11–6, 11–8. Joshna and Dipika made history by winning the gold medal at the event. This was India's first-ever squash medal in the Commonwealth Games.

=== 2015 ===
In May, Joshna reached the semifinals at the 2015 HKFC International, but failed to beat Annie Au from Hong Kong. In August, she won the Victorian Open in Australia for her tenth tour title. She beat Line Hansen from Denmark 11–5, 11–4, 11–9. In September, she won the NSCI Open title, by beating Egypt's Habiba Mohamed 11–8, 11–9, 11–6. Joshna was injured during the second game of the match, after Mohamed unintentionally struck her on the face with the racket.

In October, Joshna beat Salma Hany from Egypt 11–9, 8–11, 5–11, 11–8, 11–9 to reach the semifinals of the 2015 Carol Weymuller Open. Joshna was defeated by Joelle King in the semifinals. In the first round of the Qatar Classic, Joshna defeated Raneem El Welily from Egypt, the World No. 1 at the time. In December 2015, Joshna achieved her career-high world rank of 13. She become the highest-ranked Indian woman player, overtaking Dipika in rankings for the first time.

=== 2016 ===
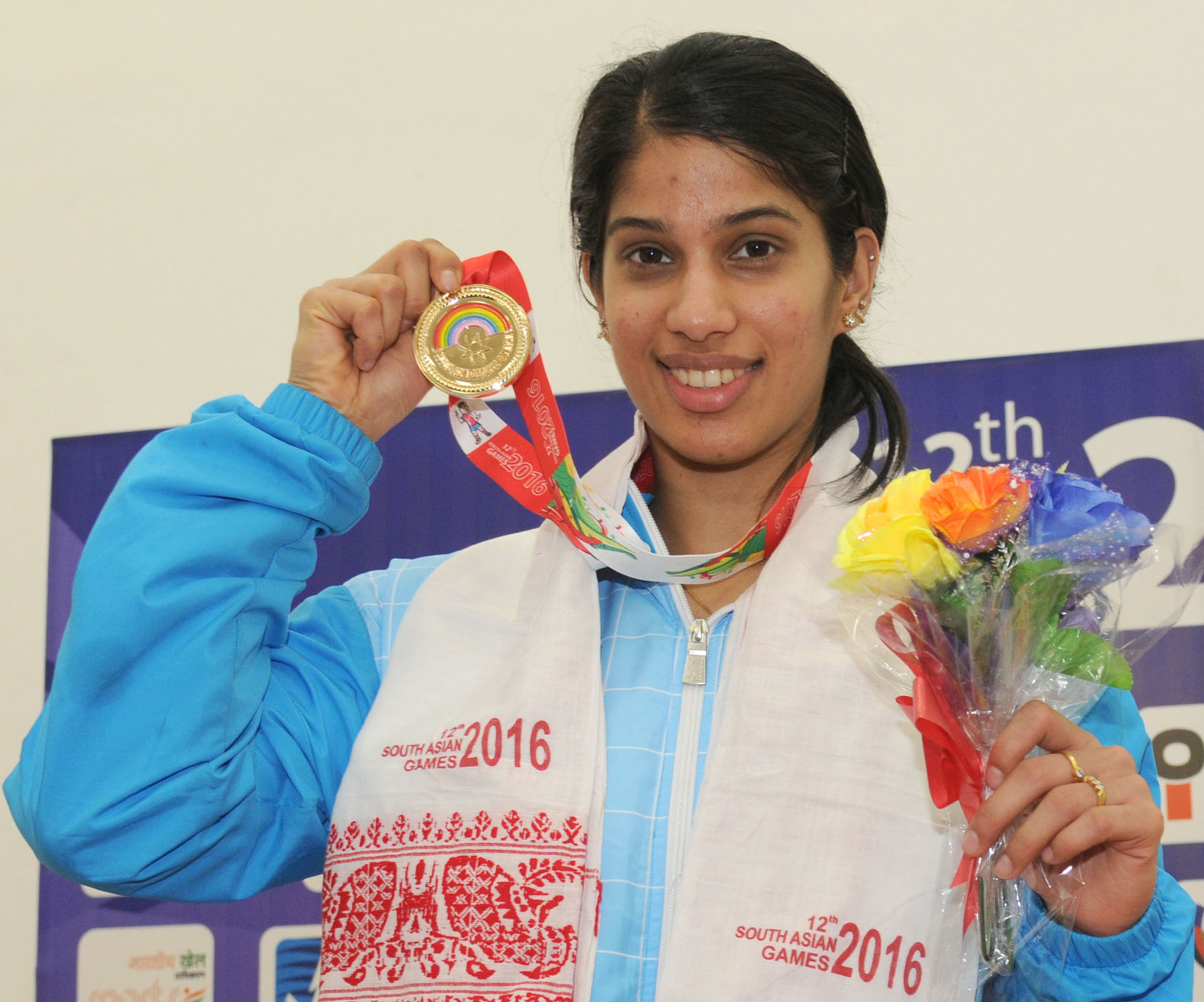
Joshna after winning the gold medal at the 2016 South Asian Games, Guwahati, 2016

In February, Joshna participated in the 2016 Cleveland Classic in the United States, where she was knocked out by Camille Serme in the quarterfinals. Then she competed at the 2016 South Asian Games in Guwahati as the top-seed. She won gold after defeating her Pakistani rival Maria Toorpaki Wazir 10–12, 11–7, 11–9, 11–7.

In May, Joshna reached the semifinals of the 2016 HKFC International in Hong Kong. This time she was able to beat Annie Au 3–2, to whom she had lost the same title the previous year. However, she lost in the finals to New Zealand's Joelle King. In July, Joshna rose to her new career-high ranking of 10, becoming the second Indian to break into the world's top 10 after Dipika. In August, Joshna participated in the 2016 SRAM Invitational in Malaysia. She managed to reach the finals after beating Joelle King in the semifinal, but was defeated by Malaysian Nicol David in the final.

In October, Joshna reached the finals of the 2016 Otters International in Mumbai after beating Tesni Evans 3–1, 11–6, 15–13, 9–11, 11–8. She lost to Hong Kong rival Annie Au in the finals 9–11, 11–13, 7–11. In November, she participated in the 2016 World Team Squash Championships in Paris with Dipika, Akanksha Salunkhe, and Sunayna Kuruvilla on the women's team. The Indian team did not qualify for the knockout stage of the championship.

=== 2017 ===
In March, Joshna competed in the 2017 British Open Squash Championship. She lost in the second round match against Raneem El Welily. In April, she participated in the 2017 Asian Individual Squash Championships, which took place in Chennai. She reached the finals where she faced Palikkal. Joshna won the long match 13–15, 12–10, 11–13, 11–4, 11–4, becoming the first Asian Squash Champion from India. In an interview, she said that winning this title was her biggest achievement.

In August, Joshna partnered with Dipika to play in the World Doubles Squash Championship. As the second-seeds, they cruised into the quarterfinals and beat Samantha Cornett and Nikole Todd 10–11, 11–6, 11–8 to enter the semifinals. They settled for a bronze medal after being defeated by Jenny Duncalf and Alison Waters.

In September, Joshna won her 15th national championship title at the 74th National Squash Championships which took place in Greater Noida. This put her only one title short of the record for most number of national championship titles. Later that month, she played in the 2017 HKFC International as the third-seed. She advanced to the final, but lost to Nour El Tayebl.

=== 2018 ===
In April, Joshna participated in the 2018 Commonwealth Games. She reached the quarterfinals of the women's singles event after beating Tamika Saxby from Australia, but lost to Joelle King 11–5, 11–6, 11–9. Joshna, along with Dipika Pallikal, won the doubles silver medal at the 2018 Commonwealth Games. In April, Joshna won her second-round match at El Gouna International against the eight-time world champion Nicol David in straight games. This was one of her more prominent upsets. She lost in the quarterfinals. In August, Joshna reached the semifinals at the 2018 Asian Games. She won the semifinal match against Nicol David 12–10, 11–9, 6–11, 10–12, 11–9. She lost to Sivasangari Subramaniam in the final, and settled for the silver medal. In October, Joshna reached the quarterfinals of the Carol Weymuller Open.

=== 2019 ===
In March, Joshna reached the quarterfinals of the Black Ball Open, where she lost to Joelle King. She went down in the semifinals of the Macau Open in April. In May, she won the 2019 Asian Individual Squash Championships, after beating Annie Au in the final. Joshna won her 17th national squash champion title in June, breaking the record held by Bhuvneshwari Kumari who had won the national title 16 times. In the World Squash Championship which took place in October, Joshna lost to Nour El Sherbini of Egypt in the pre-quarterfinal.

=== 2020 ===
In February, Joshna won her 18th national title in the 77th Senior National Championship.

== Titles ==
On 2 February 2014, Joshna won the Winnipeg Winter Open trophy – her maiden WSA world title, by defeating Egypt's Heba El Torky 11-13 11-8 11-5 3-11 12–10 in the final. Her other titles are:

- Asian Games, 2018 - Bronze (Singles), Silver (Team)
- Commonwealth Games, 2018 - Silver (Doubles)
- Asian Squash Title, 2017- Winner
- NSC Series No. 6 (Tour 12) 2009 – Winner
- British Junior Open, 2005 – Winner
- Asian Junior, 2005 – Winner
- World Junior Championships, Belgium, 2005 – Runner-up
- British Open Junior, 2004 – Runner-up
- SAF Games, Pakistan, 2004 – Gold
- Hong Kong event, 2004 – Runner-up
- Asian Championship, 2004 – Bronze
- Malaysian Junior, 2004 – Winner
- Indian National Junior, 2004 – Winner
- Indian National Senior, 2004 – Winner

== Rivalry with Dipika Pallikal ==
Joshna and Dipika pallikal are considered as India's top performing women players of all time, as they both had reached top 10 in the world in their careers. Joshna says that the so-called rivalry between the two is hyped up by the media. They are both competitive but get along well, as they are often roommates for events, and teammates in events such as the Commonwealth Games. The two together won the Women’s Doubles Gold Medal in the 2022 Squash World Doubles Championships in Glasgow, Scotland.

== See also ==
- Squash in India
- India women's national squash team
- Official Women's Squash World Ranking
