= Mihiliya Methsarani =

Sri Lankan squash player (born 1998)

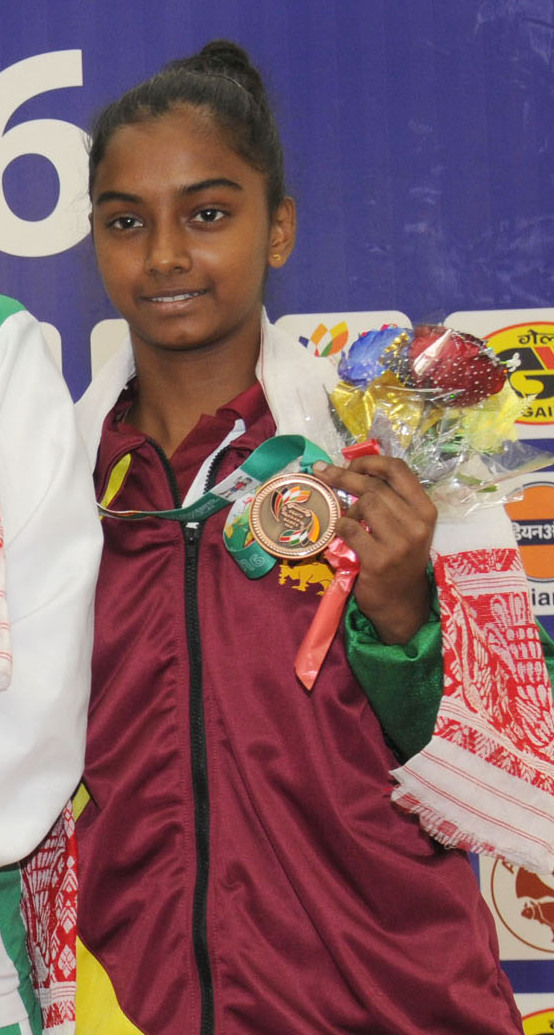

Personal information
- Nickname: Squash Queen of Sri Lanka
- Born: 15 January 1998 (age 28)
- Height: 1.60 m (5 ft 3 in)
- Weight: 47 kg (104 lb)

Sport
- Country: Sri Lanka
- Highest ranking: 208 (April 2016)
Medal record
Women's squash
Representing Sri Lanka
South Asian Games
Bronze medal – third place	2016 India	Singles
Bronze medal – third place	2019 Nepal	Team
Asian Youth Games
Bronze medal – third place	2013 Nanjing	Singles
- Updated on October 2017

Mihiliya Methsarani (born 15 January 1998) is a Sri Lankan female squash player. She has represented Sri Lanka in international competitions such as Asian Youth Games, South Asian Games, Commonwealth Games and has won medals. Currently, she is considered as Sri Lanka's best squash player.

Methsarani has won the National Squash Championship of Sri Lanka six times (2012, 2013, 2014, 2016, 2017, and 2018). Her secondary education and training was at Sirimavo Bandaranaike Vidyalaya.

Mihiliya Methsarani qualified to compete for Sri Lanka at the 2018 Commonwealth Games, which was her second Commonwealth Games appearance for Sri Lanka. During the 2018 Gold Coast Commonwealth Games, she became the first Sri Lankan squash player ever to qualify for a final round of an international squash tournament after qualifying for the plate final round during the women's singles event. In the plate final of the women's singles during the 2018 Commonwealth Games, she lost to Meagan Best of Barbados 1–3.

In 2018, Mihiliya enrolled at Mount Holyoke College, where she plays on the intercollegiate squash team, and is known by the name of Mihiliya Kalahe Arachchige.
