= Delia Arnold =

Malaysian squash player

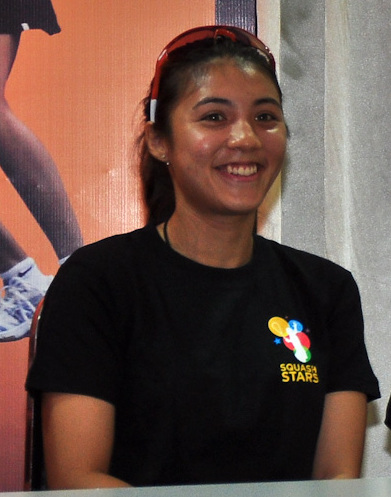
- Delia Arnold, 2010

Personal information
- Born: 26 January 1986 (age 40) Kuala Lumpur, Malaysia

Sport
- Country: Malaysia
- Handedness: Right Handed
- Turned pro: 2003
- Coached by: Ahmed Malik, Peter Genever
- Retired: 2017
- Racquet used: Prince

Women's singles
- Highest ranking: No. 12 (September, 2015)
- Title: 7
- Tour final: 6
Medal record
Women's squash
Representing Malaysia
World Team Championships
Silver medal – second place	2014 Niagara-on-the Lake	Team
Bronze medal – third place	2008 Cairo	Team
Bronze medal – third place	2010 Palmerston	Team
Bronze medal – third place	2012 Nîmes	Team
World Doubles Championships
Bronze medal – third place	2016 Darwin	Doubles
Asian Games
Gold medal – first place	2010 Guangzhou	Team
Gold medal – first place	2014 Incheon	Team
- Updated on 13 April 2022

Delia Arnold (born 26 January 1986, in Kuala Lumpur) is a former professional squash player who represented Malaysia. She reached a career-high ranking of World No. 12.

== Career ==
Arnold, coached by Ahmed Malik and Peter Genever began playing on the PSA tour in 2003 and reached the World No. 48 rankings by February 2006. More than ten months later, she moved up to the 34th spot.

In 2010, she was part of the Malaysian team that won the bronze medal at the 2010 Women's World Team Squash Championships. Two years later in 2012, she was again part of the Malaysian team that won the bronze medal at the 2012 Women's World Team Squash Championships. In 2014, she was part of the Malaysian team that won the silver medal at the 2014 Women's World Team Squash Championships.

In May 2015 she defeated world No.3 Alison Waters from England, world No.11 Annie Au from Hong Kong and world No.3 Raneem El Weleily from Egypt in the 2015 Women's British Open Squash Championship where she was eventually defeated by current world No.3 Camille Serme from France in the semi-final. She reached a career-high world ranking of World No. 12 in September 2015 after beating World Number 2, El Weleily in the quarter-finals of the British Open.

In 2017, she announced her immediate retirement from squash.

== Personal life ==
She married badminton international Robert Lin Woon Fui.

== WISPA Titles ==
All Results for Delia Arnold in WISPA World's Tour tournament

Legend WISPA Platinum Series (0) WISPA Gold Series (0) WISPA Silver Series (0) WISPA Tour Series (3)	Titles by Major Tournaments World Open (0) British Open (0) Hong Kong Open (0) Qatar Classic (0)

No.	Date	Tournament	Opponent in Final	Score in Final	Minutes Played
1.	6 November 2007	NSC Satellite No. 3	(Malaysia) Lim Yoke Wah	9–2, 9–5, 9–2	40 min
2.	16 August 2008	NSC Tour 12 No. 2	(Hong Kong) Rebecca Chiu	2–11, 11–4, 11–8, 11–9	42 min
3.	12 December 2008	NSC Super Satellite No. 5	(Australia) Donna Urquhart	11–9, 14–12, 11–3	31 min
