= Saima Shoukat =

Pakistani squash player (born 1984)

Personal information
- Born: 6 December 1984 (age 41) Lahore, Pakistan
- Height: 165 cm (5 ft 5 in)
- Weight: 70 kg (154 lb)

Sport
- Country: Pakistan
- Turned pro: 2006
- Coached by: Fahim Gul
- Retired: Active
- Racquet used: Dunlop

Women's singles
- Highest ranking: No. 127 (April 2009)
- Current ranking: No. 188 (July 2018)
- Updated on July 2018

Saima Shoukat (born 6 December 1984 in Lahore) is a Pakistani professional squash player. As of July 2018, she was ranked number 188 in the world. She has represented Pakistan internationally.
