= Fathoum Issadeen =

Sri Lankan squash player (born 1998)

Fathoum Zaleeha
Personal information
- Full name: Zaleeha Fathoum
- Born: 20 January 1998 (age 28) Colombo, Sri Lanka
- Height: 152 cm (5 ft 0 in)
- Weight: 55 kg (121 lb)
- Spouse: Sheikh Muiz Bukhary

Sport
- Country: Sri Lanka
- Handedness: Squash
- Retired: Tennis player
- Racquet used: Tecnifibre

women's singles
- Highest ranking: 150 (January 2023)
- Title: Sri Lanka Women’s Squash National Champion (2019,2020,2021) Deshamanya(2024) ITF Under 14 Asian Tennis Doubles Silver Medalist(2012)
Medal record
Women's squash
Representing Sri Lanka
South Asian Games
Bronze medal – third place	2016 Guwahati	team
Bronze medal – third place	2019 Nepal	Team
- Updated on 2025

(Deshamanya) Zaleeha Fathoum also known as Fathoum Zaleeha (born 20 January 1998) is a Sri Lankan female squash player. She reached her highest world career singles ranking of 150 in 2023. She won the National Squash Championships for the years 2019,2020 and 2021 and was Crowned Women’s Squash National Champion of Sri Lanka.

She qualified to represent Sri Lanka at the 2018 Asian Games and competed in the women's squash singles event. She represented Sri Lanka in many International Tours. She captained for Sri Lanka squash in the year 2019. She won the bronze medal in the team event at the South Asian Games in 2016 Guwahati India and also at the South Asian Games in 2019 Nepal.
