= Joey Chan =

Hong Kong squash player (born 1988)

Joey Chan MH
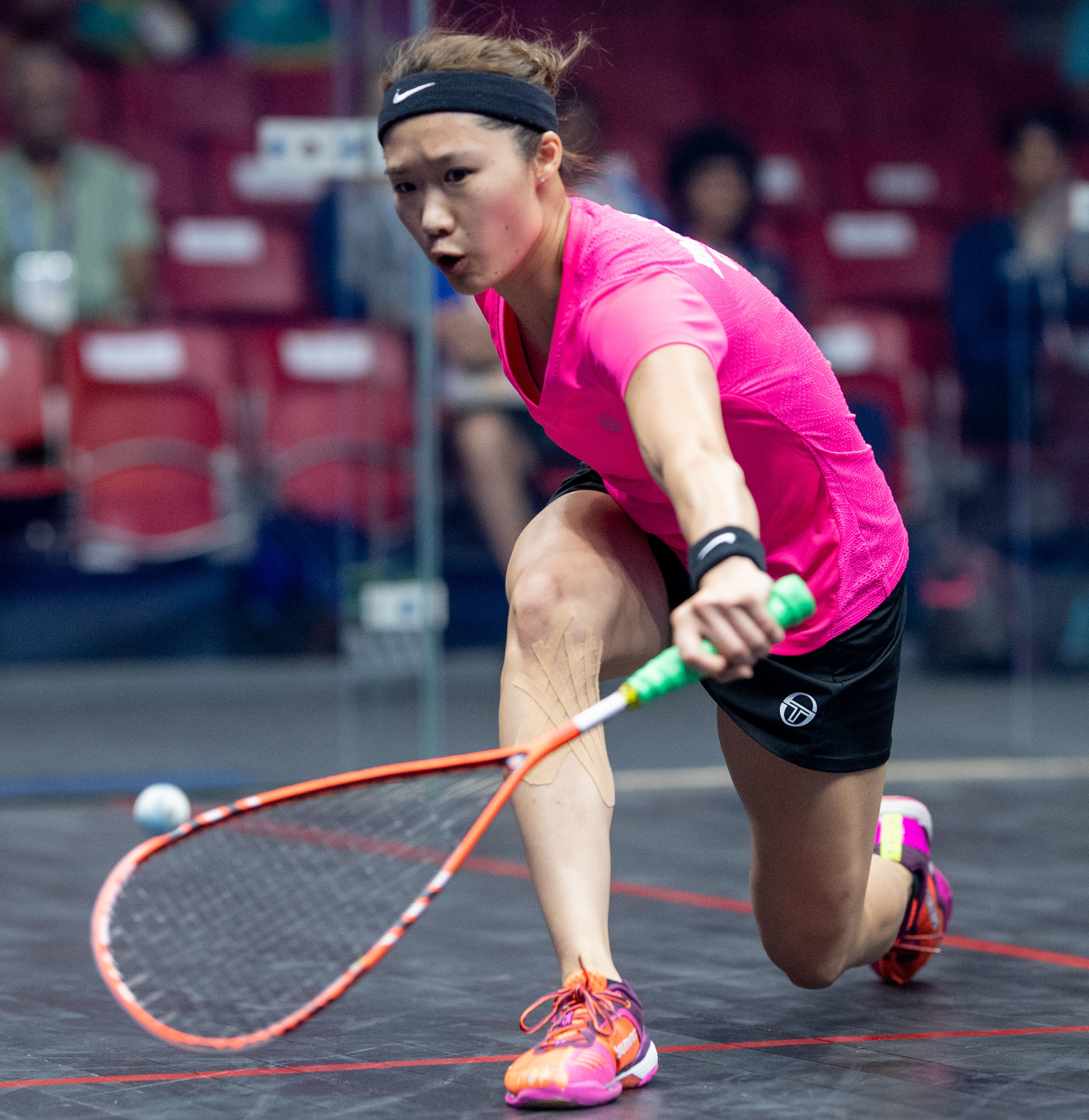
- Chan in 18th Jakarta Asian Games.

Personal information
- Full name: Joey Chan Ho-ling
- Born: Chan Ho Ling; May 20, 1988 (age 38) Hong Kong

Sport
- Country: Hong Kong
- Handedness: Left Handed
- Turned pro: 2005
- Coached by: Rebecca Chiu, Chris Robertson
- Retired: 2020
- Racquet used: Salming

Women's singles
- Highest ranking: No. 16 (May, 2012)
- Title: 6
- Tour final: 12
Medal record
Women's squash
Representing Hong Kong
World Games
Silver medal – second place	2017 Wrocław	Singles
World Team Championships
Bronze medal – third place	2016 Issy-les-Moulineaux	Team
Bronze medal – third place	2018 Dalian	Team
Asian Games
Gold medal – first place	2018 Jakarta	Team
Silver medal – second place	2010 Guangzhou	Team
Bronze medal – third place	2010 Guangzhou	Singles
Bronze medal – third place	2014 Incheon	Team
- Updated on June, 2020

Joey Chan Ho-ling MH (Chinese: 陳浩鈴; Jyutping: can^{4} hou^{5} ling^{4}; born May 20, 1988, in Hong Kong), known as Joey Chan, is a former professional squash player who represents Hong Kong. She reached a career-high world ranking of World No. 16 in May 2012.

== Career ==
Chan joined the Tour in 2003. Her consistent performances at events resulted in her breaking into the world's top 100 in 2006 and she earned semi-final finishes at the NSC Tour 12 No2 and the Taiwan Open the following year. Her first Tour title came at the Indian Challenger No.4 in 2010 and she went on to pick up the China Open and the Chairman's Cup in September of that year. She made it into the top 20 in the world in 2011, when she beat Aisling Blake in the final of the Macau Open to lift the crown and defeated the number one seed Rachael Grinham to take home the Challenge Cup title a year later.

On 7 October 2013, at the 2013 East Asian Games in Tianjin, China, Joey Chan defeated China's Li Dongjin 3-1 for the women's singles title in squash. Various runner-up finishes followed for Chan over the next few years before she ended her 2014/15 season by lifting the NZ International Classic in June 2015 with a win over Misaki Kobayashi in the main event.

Chan returned to the world's top 20 in August 2016. In December 2016, Chan and fellow Hong Kong teammates captured the bronze medal in World Women's Team Championships by beating the Malaysia Team to get into the semi-finals. In 2017, Chan became the first Hong Kong player reaches the final of the World Games and bagged a Silver medal in the women's single event.

In 2018, she was part of the Hong Kong team that won the bronze medal at the 2018 Women's World Team Squash Championships. Also in 2018, she captured the women's team gold medal in the 18th Asian Games.

== Major achievements ==
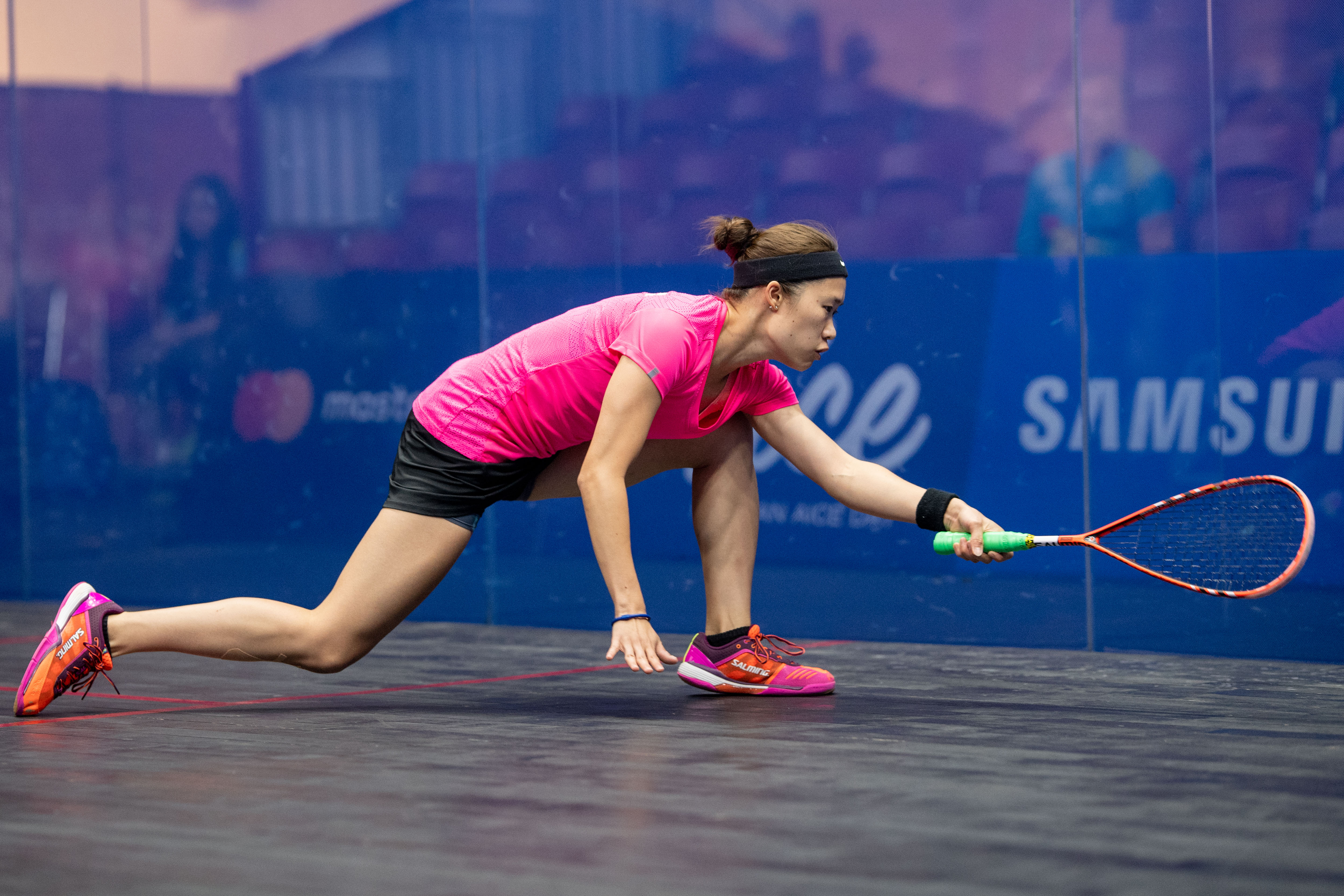
Chan during the 18th Asian Games

2017

- 10th Wroclaw World Games - Women's singles - Silver Medal

2018

- 18th Asian Games Women's team - gold medal
- 2018 World Women's Team Championships - bronze medal
- 2018 Asian Team Championships - Women's team - gold medal
- 2018 Hong Kong Squash Championships - Women's singles - silver medal
