= Li Dongjin =

Chinese squash player (born 1993)

Personal information
- Born: January 1, 1993 (age 33) China

Sport
- Country: China
- Handedness: Right Handed
- Turned pro: 2008
- Coached by: Wong Hai Wang
- Retired: Active
- Racquet used: Dunlop

Women's singles
- Highest ranking: No. 72 (September 2017)
- Current ranking: No. 88 (September 2018)
- Updated on September 2018

Li Dongjin (born January 1, 1993, in China) is a professional squash player who represents China. She reached a career-high world ranking of World No. 72 in September 2017.
