= Liu Tsz Ling =

Hong Kong squash player (born 1991)

Personal information
- Born: 10 September 1991 (age 35) Hong Kong

Sport
- Country: Hong Kong
- Handedness: Right Handed
- Turned pro: 2009
- Coached by: Tony Choi
- Retired: 2022
- Racquet used: Dunlop

Women's singles
- Highest ranking: No. 23 (January 2017)
- Title: 12
- Tour final: 18
Medal record
Women's squash
Representing Hong Kong
World Team Championships
Bronze medal – third place	2016 Issy-les-Moulineaux	Team
Asian Games
Silver medal – second place	2010 Guangzhou	Team
Bronze medal – third place	2014 Incheon	Team
- Updated on August 2022

Liu Tsz-Ling (born 10 September 1991 in Hong Kong) is a Hong Kong retired professional squash player. She reached a career-high PSA ranking of World No. 23 in January 2017.

== Career ==
In 2016, she was part of the Hong Kong team that won the bronze medal at the 2016 Women's World Team Squash Championships in France.
