= Squash in India =

Sport in India

- Country: India
- Governing body: Squash Rackets Federation of India
- National teams: India men's national squash team India women's national squash team

International competitions
- Olympic Games; World Games; World Championships; World Cup; Commonwealth Games; Asian Games; Asian Championships; South Asian Games

Squash is a recreational sport in India but is slowly gaining popularity as a competitive sport. It is governed by the Squash Rackets Federation of India. The India men's national squash team has participated in three quarter finals of the World Team Squash Championships since 1967.

Dipika Pallikal, Joshna Chinappa and Saurav Ghosal have been among the top ranked Indian squash players. Dipika was the first Indian woman to break into the top 10 women's world rankings in 2012. Saurav achieved his career high of 10 to become the highest ranked Indian male player in 2019.

== History ==
Squash was introduced to India by the British Armed Forces; the sport has been played before World War I. During the period of British rule, it was largely adopted by British colonies around the world. Most military bases had squash courts built to entertain officers. They can still be found in some army facilities in India. The British Raj restricted the use of the facilities to the upper class of society. Therefore, only those who were from the army or members of private clubs had access to squash in India.

The Squash Rackets Federation of India was formed to oversee squash in India. It conducts training camps, state and national tournaments, and the National Squash Championship. The SRFI is in charge of selecting the squad and coaches for the Indian national team. In 1990, it established the Indian Squash Academy. According to the SRFI, squash is established in only 19 states and 4 union territories.

In December 2012, squash player Dipika Pallikal Karthik achieved a career-best rank of 10. She became the first female squash player to be conferred with the Arjuna Award, India's second highest sporting award, in the year 2012. Later in December 2013, Saurav Ghosal became the first Indian male squash player to reach the top 20 by achieving a career-best rank of 15. He was also awarded the Arjuna Award by the president of India in August 2007.

=== Competition history ===
In December 2014, Dipika Pallikal and Joshna Chinappa defeated Jenny Duncalf and Laura Massaro to claim India's first-ever gold medal in squash at the Commonwealth Games. At the 2014 Asian Games, the Indian men's national team clinched gold; the women's earned their first silver. Saurav Ghosal and Dipika Pallikal, with a silver and bronze respectively in the individual events, signed off with their best medal haul in the Asian Games. The men's team, led by Saurav Ghosal, clinched the historic gold after edging out Malaysia in the individual finals. At the 2014 WSF World Junior Championship, Kush Kumar became the first male squash player from India to reach the semifinal. He made history by winning the first ever bronze medal for India at a World Junior Championship.

At 2015, Velavan Senthilkumar won a bronze medal in the boys singles event in squash at the 2015 Commonwealth Youth Games held in Samoa. Velavan Senthilkumar and Harshit Jawanda won silver in the mixed doubles competition.

In 2016, both the men's and women's national teams won gold at the 2016 South Asian Games in Guwahati. In the men's individual events, Saurav Ghosal and Harinder Pal Sandhu won bronze after losing to arch-rival Pakistan; in the women's event, top seed Joshna Chinappa won gold after defeating her Pakistani rival Sadia Gul.

In 2017, Indian doubles pair Joshna Chinappa and Dipika Pallikal won bronze after losing to English pair Jenny Duncalf and Alison Waters in the semifinals of the WSF World Doubles Squash Championship. In May 2017, Joshna Chinappa became the first Indian to clinch the Asian Squash title after beating compatriot Dipika Pallikal Karthik in the women's final. This tournament was held at Express Avenue shopping mall in an all-glass court set up inside.

During the 2018 Asian Games, Saurav Ghosal, Dipika Pallikal, and Joshna Chinappa won bronze in their respective singles events.

As of 2018, 24 Indian players were in PSA's top 500 rankings. Nine were in top 100. Saurav Ghosal became the first Indian male squash player to reach the top 20 after achieving a career best of ranking of 15 in 2013. In women's discipline, Dipika Pallikal became the first Indian woman to reach the top 10 after achieving a career-best of ranking of 10. Former player Bhuvneshwari Kumari held the most national championship titles (16) until 2019, when Joshna Chinappa broke her record.

=== Hosting history ===
The SRFI conducts tournaments from the National to Junior levels in India. The premier competition that takes place annually is the National Squash Championship. Other major tournaments include Sub Junior National Championship, Junior National Championship, Mumbai Masters Open, and Indian Junior Open.

=== National Squash Championship ===
The National Squash Championship is a seven star ranking event conducted annually. As of February 2020, it has been held 7 time, usually in February or June. Saurav Ghosal and Joshna Chinappa, representing the Indian state of Tamil Nadu, are the current champions, after defeating Abhishek Pradhan and Urwashi Joshi in the finals of the 2020 edition. The total prize money of the edition was ₹12 lakh (US$12,000).

=== Other events ===
In 2011, the SRFI conducted the WSF World Cup between March 8 and March 12. It was initially scheduled to be held at the ICL-TNSRA Squash Academy, but moved to an all-glass court erected at the Express Avenue mall. The first seed, Egypt won the event by beating the second seed, England.

In 2012, inaugural edition of U-21 World Cup was held in Chennai at the Express Avenue mall. It was supported by the Sports Development of Tamil Nadu. Egypt beat India in finals to win the event.

== Medal table ==
Tournament	1st place, gold medalist(s)	2nd place, silver medalist(s)	3rd place, bronze medalist(s)	Total
World
Olympic Games	TBA	TBA	TBA	TBA
World Individual Championships	0	0	0	0
World Doubles Championships	4	2	3	9
World Team Championships	0	0	0	0
Squash World Cup	1	0	1	2
Commonwealth Games	1	2	2	5
Asia
Asian Games	3	4	11	18
Asian Individual Championships	3	3	0	6
Asian Doubles Championships	3	0	1	4
Asian Team Championships	2	6	20	28
South Asia
South Asian Games	5	5	2	12
Total	9	16	26	51

- Updated till 31 July 2026

== National award recipients ==
Year	Recipient	Award	Gender
1961	K. S. Jain	Arjuna Award	Male
1969	Anil Nayar	Arjuna Award	Male
1979–1980	Rajkumar Manchanda	Arjuna Award	Male
1982	Bhuvneshwari Kumari	Arjuna Award	Female
1990	M. R. Dharuvala	Arjuna Award	Male
1997	Misha Grewal	Arjuna Award	Female
2006	Saurav Ghosal	Arjuna Award	Male
2012	Dipika Pallikal	Arjuna Award	Female
2013	Joshna Chinappa	Arjuna Award	Female
2014	Anaka Alankamony	Arjuna Award	Female
2004	Cyrus Poncha	Dronacharya Award	Male

== See also ==
- Squash Rackets Federation of India
- India men's national squash team
- India women's national squash team
