= Reyazuddin Ahmad =

Reyaz Uddin Ahmad (Bengali: রেয়াজুদ্দীন আহমদ, Arabic: رياض الدين أحمد) is a Bengali masculine given name of Arabic origin. It may refer to:

- Reazuddin Ahmad Mashadi (1859–1918), writer and philosopher
- Muhammad Reazuddin Ahmad (1861–1933), writer and journalist
- Sheikh Reyazuddin Ahmed (1882–1972), author
- Md. Reazuddin Ahmed (1929–1997), former deputy speaker of parliament
- Riaz Uddin Ahmed (1945–2021), journalist and former president of Jatiya Press Club
- Riaz Uddin Ahamed Siddique (born 1972), film actor, producer, and television presenter

== See also ==
- Rezauddin Stalin
- Reyaz
- Uddin
- Ahmad
