= Riaz Uddin Ahmed (disambiguation) =

Riaz Uddin Ahmed may refer to:

- Riaz Uddin Ahmed (1945–2021), Bangladeshi journalist
- Md. Reazuddin Ahmed (1929–1997), Bangladeshi politician
- Muhammad Reazuddin Ahmad (1861–1933), Bengali writer
- Riaz Uddin Ahmed (admiral), Bangladesh Navy admiral

== See also ==
- Reazuddin Ahmad Mashadi, Bengali writer
- Sheikh Reyazuddin Ahmed (1882–1972), Bengali writer
