= SSRA =

SSRA may refer to:

- SsrA, a gene responsible for transfer-messenger RNA
- Selective serotonin releasing agent, a drug
- Shadow Strategic Rail Authority
- Singapore Squash Rackets Association
- Socialist Soviet Republic of Abkhazia
- Shan State Revolutionary Army, an insurgent group in Shan State that surrendered in August 1980
- Supervisory Senior Resident Agent, a special agent rank in the FBI held by a GS-14 or GS-15 supervisory special agent in a large resident agency office
