= Selina Bahar Zaman =

Bangladeshi writer and academic

- Born: Parveen Sultana Chaudhury; 15 February 1940; Kolkata, Bengal Presidency, British India
- Died: 4 December 2004 (aged 64)
- Education: University of Dhaka
- Parents: Habibullah Bahar Chowdhury (father); Anwara Bahar Chowdhury (mother)
- Relatives: Iqbal Bahar Chowdhury (brother)

Selina Bahar Zaman (née Chaudhury; 15 February 1940 – 4 December 2004) was a Bangladeshi writer and academic.

== Background ==
Zaman was born Parveen Sultana Chaudhury to Habibullah Bahar Chowdhury and Anwara Bahar Chowdhury. Habibullah was a politician and journalist and Anwara a social activist and writer.

== Education ==
Zaman started her school life at Kolkata. After her family's migration to Dhaka, she completed her matriculation examination from Qamrunnesa School in 1954. She then completed her bachelor's and master's in mathematics from the University of Dhaka in 1960. She started her career as a lecturer at the Eden Mohila College. She retired from the Jagannath University College in 1997 as the head of the department of mathematics.

== Works ==
- Habibullah Bahar Smarak Grantha (1995)
- Jahur Hossain Chaudhury Smarak Grantha (1996)
- Anwara Bahar Chaudhury Smarak Grantha (1997)
- Shamsuddin Abul Kalam Smarak Grantha (1999)
- Shamsunnahar Mahmud Smarak Grantha (2002)
- Begum Rokeya Smarak Grantha (2002)
- Shaukat Osman Smarak Grantha (2003)
