= Lakshmi Shruti Settipalli =

Indian squash player

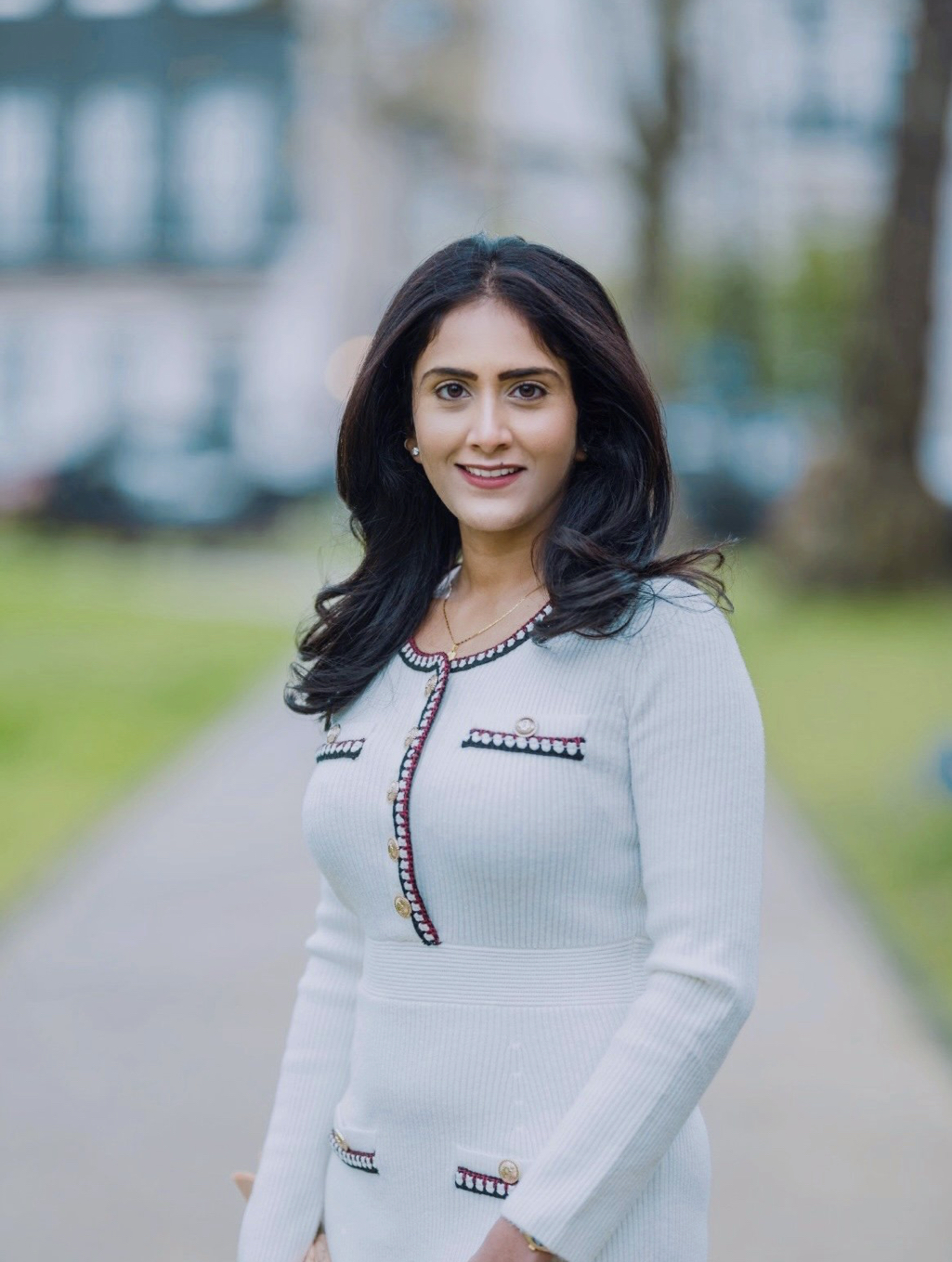
Lakshmi Settipalli

Lakshmi Shruti Settipalli (born 12 June 1996) is an Indian squash player. She was ranked 30 in the junior European circuit at the end of 2012. She played as a professional when she was seventeen, achieving a world ranking of 145 in August 2013.

== Early life ==
Lakshmi Shruti was born on 12 June 1996 in Chennai to Suresh and Vaishnevi Settipalli.

Shruti was a student of the Lady Andal School where she was awarded the Athlete of the Year prize for her performances in national and international squash tournaments.

== Squash ==
She started playing squash at the age of twelve. squash career at Madras Cricket Club and then moved her training to the ICL-TNSRA squash academy in Chennai under the national coach, Cyrus Poncha. She won a gold in the team category at the All India Punj Lloyds PSA Masters tournament held in Delhi, earning the rank of the top-15 player in India.

Reaching a career-high of 30 in European Circuit in 2012, Shruti is the first Indian to win a silver in the Slovakia Junior Open. She also won the bronze medal in the Finland Junior Open in Helsinki. Her other achievements include winning the gold medal in the Chennai Junior Open and silver in the AP Junior Open in Hyderabad. She finished in the top five in the Australian Junior Open, Spanish Junior Open, and Indian Junior Open. In 2013, she won two WSA titles, including coming first in the Malaysian Tour. She was ranked 30 in the European circuit at the end of 2012.

She played NCAA Division 1 squash for George Washington University in Washington D.C. Her freshman year of 2014 to 2015, she won all of her matches and achieved a national rank of number eight.

She entered the Professional Squash Association at sixteen and reached her career rank 145 as a professional in 2017. She played in the U.S. Open, the Australian Open, the Finish Open, the Swiss Open, and the British Open.

== Education and career ==
Shruti moved to the United States to attend George Washington University, graduating with a Bachelor's degree in organizational sciences. She also completed a MSc in Innovation, Entrepreneurship, and Management at Imperial College London in 2020.

Shruti founded a sustainable packaging company, Ecoverse, in London, England.
