= Munshi Mohammad Meherullah =

Bangabandhu Munshi Mohammad Meherullah
- মুনশী মোহাম্মদ মেহেরুল্লাহ

Personal life
- Born: 1861 Kaliganj, Jessore District, Bengal Presidency, British India
- Died: 7 May 1907 (aged 45–46)

Religious life
- Religion: Islam

Muslim leader
- Disciples: Shaikh Zamiruddin
- Arabic name
- Personal (Ism): Muḥammad Mihirullāh محمد مهر الله
- Patronymic (Nasab): ibn Muḥammad Wārith بن محمد وارث
- Toponymic (Nisba): al-Jasarī الجسري

Munshi Mohammad Meherullah (1861 – 7 May 1907) was a Bengali Islamic scholar, poet, and social reformer. He is the first person in history with the title Bangabandhu, and is best known for his oratory and writing on Islam and comparative religion. His efforts have been compared to Raja Ram Mohan Roy's defense of Hinduism against anti-Hindu views expounded by Christian missionaries in India.

== Early life ==
Meherullah was born in 1861 to a Bengali Muslim family of Munshis in Kaliganj under Jhenaidah subdivision, Jessore District of the Bengal Presidency. He learnt Bengali at a local school until the untimely death of his father, Munshi Muhammad Warith, when he was around 10 years old. He further continued his education under the guidance of Moulvi Ismail Sahib, with the financial help of his maternal family. He learned Arabic and Persian during these years. From another teacher, Munshi Musabuddin, he learned Urdu. With his vast knowledge of languages and the Quran, he became not only an important figure in his local community but someone who could converse with members of elite households in Dhaka and Calcutta. The elite spoke and wrote in different languages, depending on where they resided and who they were. He was a polyglot, visionary, and a channel for communication between these people of different socio-economic classes. Interestingly, along with everything else, Meherullah was a businessman. After doing a government job for a short while, he got trained as a tailor and used his business not only to support his family but also to stay in touch with his community.

== Religious conversions ==
During his lifetime, Christian missionaries moved into disaster-struck rural parts of Bengal and started converting Muslims with the promise of hospitals, food, and education. The salvation that the missionaries provided improved lives but at the cost of having to give up on one's beliefs.

Young Meherullah was initially attracted to Christianity, seeing the charitable efforts of the missionaries. Muhammad Abdul Majid mentions this in Chotoder Munshi Mohammad Meher Ullah. According to Majid, Meherullah became a Christian, moved to Darjeeling, and lived under the patronage of Christian missionaries. There, he studied not only the Bible but also the books written by Muslim dais and decided to revert to Islam and shed light on the beauty of Islam to the people who were converted with misinformation used to vilify Islam .

== Religious activism ==
Abul Ahsan Chaudhuri points out that cycles of epidemics, flooding, and famines had unsettled the agricultural ecosystem and the socio-economic infrastructure in Nadia and Jessore. As a result, the charitable efforts of Christian missionaries made the Muslim peasantry particularly vulnerable to conversion.

Meherullah, upon returning to Jessore District and with his re-converted disciple Shaikh Jamiruddin, adopted oratory method known as bahas (disputation) and sought to refute Christian missionaries. He was able to re-convert numerous Muslims who had been converted to Christianity. He established Madrasaye Karamatia and Islam Dharmottejika Sabha in 1889 at Manoharpur village in Jessore. He contributed regularly to Muslim newspapers like the Sudhakar and Islam Pracharak published from Kolkata.

According to Kenneth W. Jones, no other Muslim preacher contributed to polemical literature in that period. While debating Christian missionaries, Meherullah did not vilify them. He called for intra-communal harmony.

Also, among his other major contributions, Meherullah strived to teach the Muslim population not to adopt primitive ideas from their neighboring Hindu society, which was opposed to the remarriage of widows.

== Notable works ==
Meherullah wrote at least 10 books between 1886 and 1908, which include

- Isayee Ba Khristani Dhoka Bhanjan
- Khristiya Dharmer Asarata (The hollowness of the Christian religion, 1887),
- Bidhabagavjana O Bisadbhandar (Sufferings of Widows, 1894),
- Meherul Islam (1897);
- Hindu Dharma Rahasya O Devalila (1898, 2 editions)
- Mussalman O Christian Tarkayuddha (Muslim and Christian Debates, 1908; 2 editions).
- Rodde Khrishtian O Dlaliul Islam
- Babu Ishanchandra Mandal and Charles French er Eslam Grahan (Embracing of Islam by Babu Ishanchandra Mandal and Charles French),
- Slokmala (Compilation of verses)

== Death and legacy ==
Meherullah died on 7 May 1907. An obituary in the Mihir-o-Sudhakar, written by Sheikh Abdur Rahim, wrote:

The political and religious world of Bengali Muslims is shrouded in great darkness. The person who dedicated his life to the uplift and reform of religion and society and infused a new life in Bengali Muslims, that preacher of the true values of Islam, Munshi Mohammad Meherullah, alas, is no more. The Christian padris shook in fear when they heard him defend Islam. His advice brought many Christian converts back into the fold.

Other publications, such as the Islam Pracharak and the Moslem Suhrid, expressed profound grief.

His protégé, Shaikh Jamiruddin, wrote a hagiographic biography, Meher Charit. Abdul Hai remarked, "Meherullah proved to be the Ram Mohan Roy of the Muslims of Bengal — Roy saved the Hindus from being converted to Christianity in the early nineteenth century, and Meherullah saved the Muslims from being proselytized to Christianity in the late nineteenth century."

A railway station in Jessore was named after him. Bangladesh published a stamp of face value 2 taka in his honor in 1995. A hall of the Jashore University of Science and Technology is named after him.
