= Riaz (name) =

Riaz (Arabic: رياض) is a Central Asian masculine given name and surname of Arabic and Persian origin. It's common in the United Arab Emirates, Oman, Iran and Pakistan.

== Given name ==
- Riaz Hassan (1937–2022), Australian academic
- Riyaz Punjabi (1947–2021), professor and vice chancellor at the University of Kashmir
- Riyaz Ahmad (1958–2021), Indian politician
- Riaz Shahid (died 1972), Pakistani filmmaker and journalist
- Riaz Bagwan (born 1960), Indian cricketer
- Riaz Poonawala (born 1961), former cricketer
- Riaz Basra (1967–2002), Pakistani militant
- Riaz Farcy (born 1967), Hong Kong cricketer
- Riyaz Khan (born 1960), Indian actor and bodybuilder
- Riaz (actor) (born 1972), Bangladeshi film actor
- Riaz Afridi (born 1985), Pakistani cricketer
- Riaz Amin (born 1998), English professional martial artist
- Riyaz Kharrat, Iranian chemical engineer
- Reaz Rahman, Bangladeshi former State Minister of Foreign Affairs

== Surname ==
- Fahmida Riaz (born 1946), Urdu writer
- Mohammed Riaz (born 1972), Indian field hockey player
- Hussain Riyaz (born 1974), Maldivian sprinter
- Wahab Riaz (born 1985), Pakistani cricketer
- Adeeba Riyaz, Kashmiri poet

== Arabic-based compound names with Riaz as an element ==
- Riaz al-Din, multiple people
  - Riazuddin (1930–2013), Pakistani theoretical physicist
  - Riazuddin (1958–2019), Pakistani cricket umpire
  - Shaikh Riazuddin (born 1971), Indian cricketer
  - Hamza Riazuddin (born 1989), British-Pakistani cricketer
  - Riyaz Uddin, Indian painter
  - Riaz al-Din Ahmad, multiple people
- Riaz al-Hasan
  - Mirza Riyaz Ul Hassan Effendi (born 1977)
- Riaz Al Haqq
  - A. F. Mohammad Reazul Huq Chowdhury, Bangladeshi politician
  - Reyazul Haque Raju (born 1965), Indian politician
- Riaz al-Huda
  - Riyazul Huda, Bangladeshi cricketer
- Riaz al-Mawla
  - Reazul Mowla Rezu (born 1985), Bangladeshi film director, producer and screenplay writer

== See also ==
- Riaz, municipality in the district of Gruyère in the canton of Fribourg in Switzerland.
- Riaz Gujjar, a 1991 Pakistani film
- Rabbi Isaiah di Trani the Younger, a 13th-century Italian Talmudist
