= Mamun Mahmud =

Bangladeshi police officer and a martyr

- Born: November 17, 1928; Chittagong, Bengal, British India
- Education: MA (International relations)
- Alma mater: Presidency College, Aligarh Muslim University, Dhaka University
- Occupation: Police services
- Parents: Dr. Wahiduddin Mahmud (father); Shamsunnahar Mahmud (mother)
- Awards: Independence Award (2015)
- Disappeared: March 26, 1971 (aged 42); Rajshahi, East Pakistan
- Status: Presumed dead

Mamun Mahmud, born Salauddin Mahmud, (17 November 1928 – 26 March 1971) was a police officer and a martyr of the 1971 Bangladesh Liberation War.

== Early life ==
Mahmud was born on 17 November 1928 in Chittagong, East Bengal, British India. His mother, Begum Shamsunnahar Mahmud, was a female educationalist and social worker in Bengal. His father, Dr Wahiduddin Mahmud, was the Superintendent of Calcutta Medical College and Surgeon General of East Pakistan. His maternal uncle, Habibullah Bahar Chowdhury, was a close friend of the poet Kazi Nazrul Islam. Mahmud had one sibling, a younger brother.

Mahmud studied at the Pratt Memorial School and graduated from Ballygunge Government High School in 1942. He graduated from Presidency College in 1943 and from Aligarh Muslim University in 1947. He graduated from the University of Dhaka with a Masters in Public Relations in 1949.

== Career ==
Mahmud successfully took the Central Superior Services exam of Pakistan and joined government service as a police officer in 1951. He served as the Deputy Inspector General of Police and the Superintendent of Police of Kurigram, Brahmanbaria, Chittagong, Chittagong Hill Tracts, Faridpur, Khulna, Dhaka, Mymensingh and Rajshahi. In 1954 while stationed in Kurigram he founded the Kurigram Cricket Club. He had served as the chairperson of the Pakistan Football Federation Referees Board. He edited Detective, a police journal, in 1956.

On 17 January 1970, Mahmud refused orders to fire at citizens protesting a rally of Abul A'la Maududi in Dhaka. He was transferred to Mymensingh after the incident in Dhaka. In 1971, Mahmud was the Deputy Inspector General of Police in Rajshahi. On 3 March 1971, he hoisted a black flag at his residence protesting the killing of Bengali civilians by Pakistan Army. He had also refused to arrest the guards of the treasury house in Rajshahi who refused to allow a Pakistan Army captain access on 26 March 1971.

== Personal life ==
Mamun Mahmud was married to Moshfeqa Mahmud on 26 March 1954. Their daughter Zeba Mahmud was born in 1956 and their son Javed Mahmud was born in 1960.

== Disappearance ==
On the evening of 26 March 1971, Mahmud was celebrating his 17th marriage anniversary with his wife and two children at their home in Rajshahi when he was called to the Rajshahi Cantonment Area to meet Brigadier General Abdullah. He, his driver, and his bodyguard were never seen again since that night. All India Radio announced his death on 13 April 1971.

On 14 December 1995, the government of Bangladesh issued stamps in his name and named a road after him in Dhaka. Shahid Mamun Mahmud Police Lines School and College in Rajshahi was named after him.
