= Shameena Riaz =

Indian squash player

Personal information
- Born: 11 August 2005 (age 21)
- Height: 153 cm (60 in)

Sport
- Country: India

Women's singles
- Highest ranking: 149 (July 2026)
- Current ranking: 154 (September 2026)
- Title: 0
- Tour final: 1
- PSA Profile
Medal record
Women's squash
Representing India
Asian Games
Bronze medal – third place	2026 Aichi-Nagoya	Team

Shameena Riaz (born 11 August 2005) is an Indian squash player from Chennai. She was part of the Indian team that won the bronze medal in the women's team event at the 2026 Asian Games.

== Early life ==
Shameena Riaz hails from Chennai. Both her parents were field hockey players and her father, Mohammed Riaz, was a former captain of the India national field hockey team and a two time Olympian. She is a student of electronics and communications engineering at SRM Institute of Science and Technology in Chennai.

== Career ==
Shameena first came across squash at the Madras Cricket Club. She later took up the sport and joined the Indian Squash Academy in Chennai. She was part of the Indian squad for the 2026 Asian Games. Shameena, along with Anahat Singh, Joshna Chinappa, and Tanvi Khanna, won the bronze medal in the women's team event at the Asian Games. The Indian quartet were unbeaten in the pool stage. Shameena lost to Ziyuan Yin of China in the only match she played in Pool C. She lost the contest 2–3 with set scores of 11–8, 11–6, 9–11, 9–11, 12–14. India beat Singapore in the quarterfinals, before losing to Hong Kong in the semifinals.
