= Shaikh Jamiruddin =

Writer and religious preacher

Shaikh Muhammad Jamiruddin
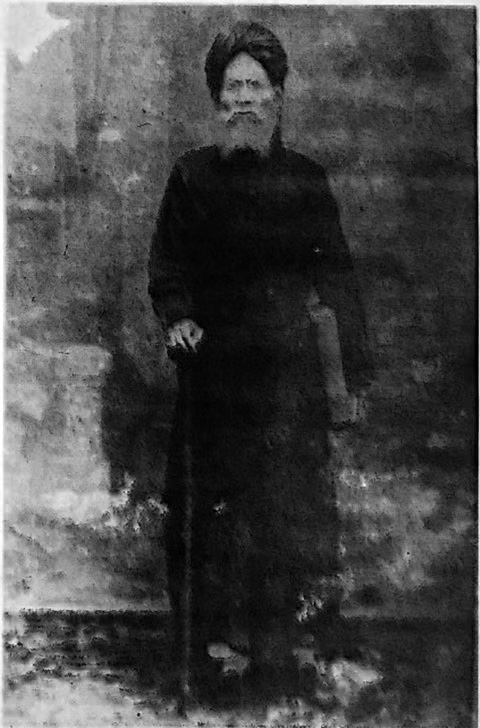

Personal life
- Born: January 1870 Garadobe-Bahadurpur, Meherpur, Bengal Presidency, British India
- Died: 2 June 1937 (aged 66–67) Meherpur, Bengal Presidency

Religious life
- Religion: Islam
- Denomination: Sunni
- Jurisprudence: Hanafi

Muslim leader
- Disciple of: Munshi Mohammad Meherullah
- Arabic name
- Personal (Ism): Ḍamīr ad-Dīn ضمير الدين
- Patronymic (Nasab): ibn Amīr ad-Dīn ibn Bāqir ad-Dīn بن أمير الدين بن باقر الدين
- Toponymic (Nisba): al-Mihirfūrī المهرفوري

Shaikh Muhammad Jamiruddin (Bengali: শেখ মোহম্মদ জমিরউদ্দীন; January 1870 – 2 June 1937) was a Bengali Islamic preacher and writer.

== Early life and family ==
Shaikh Muhammad Jamiruddin was born in January 1870 to a Bengali Muslim family of Shaikhs in the village of Garadobe-Bahadurpur in Gangni, Meherpur, then located under the Nadia district of the Bengal Presidency. His father was Sufi Shaikh Muhammad Amiruddin, son of Shaikh Muhammad Baqer Uddin, and his mother was Lafiran Bibi.

== Education ==
Jamiruddin studied at the Amjhupi Christian School and then at the Krishnanagar Normal School. In 1887, he was converted to Christianity and became known as John Jamiruddin. He graduated from St. Paul's Divinity College, Allahabad in theology in 1891. Later, he was admitted into Divinity College in Calcutta where he studied Christianity and Sanskrit, Arabic, Greek and Hebrew literature and grammar. He also knew Bengali, English, Urdu, Persian and Latin.

== Career ==
Jamiruddin wrote an article titled Asol Koran Kothay in the Khristiyo Bandhob in June 1892. In reply Munshi Mohammad Meherullah wrote an article titled Isayi Ba Khristani Dhoka Bhonjon that was published in The Sudhakar on 20 and 27 June 1892, where he gave the answers of Jamiruddin's six questions. Later, Jamiruddin wrote an article against The Sudhakar reply. In reply to that, Munshi Mohammad Meherullah wrote an article titled Asol Koran Sorbotro.

After reading Meherullah's second article, Jamiruddin decided to revert to Islam.

Jamiruddin wrote books on religious issue. He translated and wrote books on social issues too. He wrote books like Hazrat Isa Ke, Islami Baktrita, Shrestha Nabi Hazrat Mohammad (SM), Padrir Dhokavonjon and more.

== Death ==
Jamiruddin died on 2 June 1937. He was buried in his family graveyard.
