= The Sudhakar =

Sudhakar
- Type: Weekly magazine
- Editor: Merajuddin Ahmad; Reazuddin Ahmad Mashhadi; Mohammad Reazuddin Ahmed
- Founded: 1889
- Ceased publication: 1910
- Language: Bengali
- Headquarters: Kolkata, Bengal, British India

Sudhakar was a Bengali weekly magazine established by Reazuddin Ahmad Mashadi and Sheikh Abdur Rahim. It began publication on 8 November 1889 (23 Kartik 1296 of the Bangla calendar) from Kolkata.

== Background ==
It was first edited by Sheikh Abdur Rahim or Muhammad Reazuddin Ahmad according to other accounts.

The magazine primary aim was preaching Islam. At some point, the magazine changed its name to Mihir O Sudhakar. The magazine printed polemics on religious issues against another Khristiya Bandhab (Friends of Christians), a magazine published by Christian missionaries.

=== Ideological stance ===
According to Nurul Kabir, its objectives were defending Islam from orientalist's criticisms and the vilification of the Muslims by the local communalist Hindu intellectuals, enlightening the Bengali Muslims with Islamic principles and prevent conversions to Christianity.

When Mir Mosharraf Hossain supported the ban on cow-slaughtering, the Sudhakar endorsed Tangail's Maulvi Naimuddin protest of the ban. Regular contributors included Munshi Mohammad Meherullah and Sheikh Abdur Rahim.

== Closure ==
Sudhakar continued being published up to 1910.

== Legacy ==
Nurul Kabir writes of The Sudhakar's influence on the development of the identity of Bengali Muslims:

"(The Sudhakar) infused a sense of confidence in the Muslim society of Bengal about the inherent strength of Islam, enlightening the Bengali Muslims about the great contributions that Islam has made in the development of human civilisation and inspiring them to create their own literature in their own mother tongue - Bangla.

He also compares its influence on contemporary Islamic culture equivalent to that the Tattwabodhini Patrika on the contemporary Bengali Hindu society.

The periodical is also credited for popularizing the use of Arabic and Persian loanwords in the Bengali language and Bengali literature among Bengali Muslims.
