= Shantinagar (neighbourhood) =

Neighbourhood in Dhaka, Bangladesh

Coordinates: 23.738°N 90.414°E

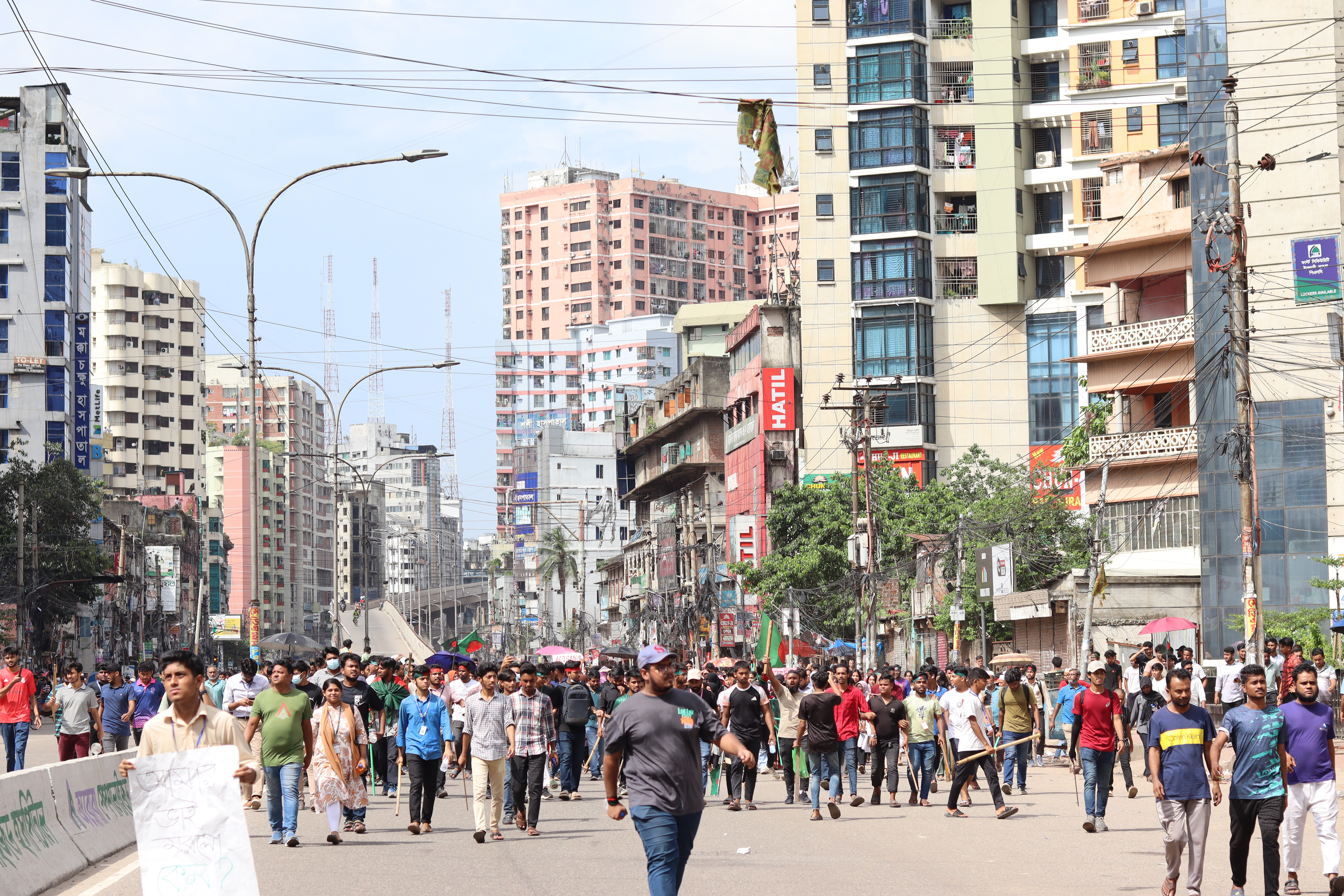
Bir Uttam Samsul Alam Rd, with Shantinagar on the right, during the Non-cooperation movement (2024)

Shantinagar (Bengali: শান্তিনগর) is an upscale neighbourhood in Dhaka, the capital of Bangladesh. It is under Paltan Thana. Shantinagar is administered by Dhaka South City Corporation. It is one of the busiest areas in Dhaka. Its neighbouring areas are Bailey Road, Siddeshwari, Segunbagicha, Paltan, Rajarbagh, and Kakrail. Numerous shops, pharmacies, restaurants, and salons can be found in Shantinagar. Eastern Plus Shopping Complex, a well-known place for shopping around the locality, is also located in Shantinagar. The Rajarbagh Police Lines are located near Shantinagar.

== Education ==
- Habibullah Bahar College
- Kids Tutorial English Medium school
- Green Bud School
- Siddheswari Girls' High School
- Viqarunnisa Noon School and College
