= Habibullah Bahar Chowdhury =

Pakistani politician and journalist (1906–1966)

- হবীবুল্লাহ বাহার চৌধুরী حبیب اللہ بہار چودھری
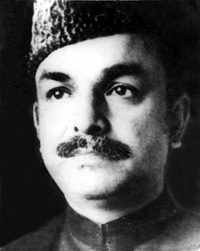

Health Minister of East Pakistan Provincial Assembly
- In office 1947–1950s
- Preceded by: Position created

Personal details
- Pronunciation: [ɦobibulːaʱ baɦaɾ t͡ʃou̯d̪ʱuɾi]
- Born: 1906 Feni, Eastern Bengal and Assam, British India
- Died: 15 April 1966 (aged 59–60) East Pakistan, Dacca
- Spouse: Anwara Bahar Chowdhury
- Children: Iqbal Bahar Chowdhury; Selina Bahar Zaman
- Relatives: Shamsunnahar Mahmud (sister); Khan Bahadur Abdul Aziz (grandfather)
- Occupation: Politician, writer

Habibullah Bahar Chowdhury (Note: Bengali pronunciation: [ɦobibulːaʱ baɦaɾ t͡ʃou̯d̪ʱuɾi].) (Bengali pronunciation: [ɦobibulːaʱ baɦaɾ t͡ʃou̯d̪ʱuɾi]; 1906 – 15 April 1966) was a politician, journalist, footballer and writer from erstwhile East Bengal, now Bangladesh, who served in the political spheres of British India and Pakistan.

== Early life and education ==
Chowdhury was born at Guthuma village in Feni district in 1906. His father, Mohammad Nurullah, was a munsiff. He passed Matriculation in 1922 from Chittagong Municipal School and ISc from Chittagong College in 1924. He then graduated from Calcutta Islamia College in 1928.

== Playing career ==
Bahar played as a footballer with Kolkata Mohammedan. Under his captainship, the team was promoted to the Calcutta Football League First Division in 1933.

== Sports administration ==
Bahar moved to East Pakistan after the Partition of India. He served as the president of the Dhaka Sports Association (DSA) shortly after the partition. In January 1951, after the DSA was renamed East Pakistan Sports Association (EPSA), he served as its president. On 20 May 1951, he merged the EPSA with the East Pakistan Sports Federation (EPSF) and began serving as the president of the reintroduced EPSF. In 1952, the EPSF successfully hosted the National Football Championship in Dacca, which became Bahar's biggest success as its president.

== Career ==
In 1933, Chowdhury took up journalism and along with his sister, Shamsunnahar Mahmud, published the literary journal "Bulbul". Chowdhury actively joined politics as an activist of the Bengal Provincial Muslim League, and was elected a member of its executive committee in 1937. In 1944, he was elected publicity secretary of the League. He was elected a member of the Bengal Legislative Assembly from the Parshuram constituency of Feni district. He was the health minister of the first Muslim League cabinet in East Pakistan.

== Works ==
After suffering a stroke, he resigned from the cabinet position in 1953. Chowdhury started writing books prior to the 1947 partition of India. His works include "Pakistan", "Mohammad Ali Jinnah", "Omar Faruq", and "Ameer Ali".

== Personal life ==
Chowdhury was married to Anwara Bahar Chowdhury (1919–1987). Anwara was a social activist and writer. She established Habibullah Bahar College in 1969 after Chowdhury's name. Together they had 4 daughters – Selina Bahar Zaman, Shaheen Westcombe, Nasreen Shams and Tazeen Chowdhury and one son - Iqbal Bahar Chowdhury. Chowdhury's grandfather, Khan Bahadur Abdul Aziz, an educationist, had a close relationship with poet Kazi Nazrul Islam.
