= Mearajuddin Ahmad =

19th-century Bengali Islamic scholar

Mearajuddin Ahmad Saheb
- মেয়রাজউদ্দীন আহমদ
- Born: Satkhira, Khulna, Bengal Presidency
- Died: Bengal Presidency
- Education: St. Xavier's College
- Occupations: Writer, journalist
- Era: British Raj

Mearajuddin Ahmad (Bengali: মেয়রাজউদ্দীন আহমদ) was a 19th-century Bengali academic, writer, and Islamic scholar.

== Early life ==
Ahmad was born in Satkhira District, Khulna Division, Bengal Presidency, British Raj. He was fluent in Bengali and Urdu languages.

== Career ==
Ahmad translated Urdu-language articles into Bengali for the Sudhakar magazine. In 1885 he wrote Tuhfatul Moslemin with Muhammad Reazuddin Ahmad. He was a professor of Arabic and Persian languages at St Xavier's College in Kolkata. In 1890 he wrote Dharmayuddha Ba Jihad O Samaj Samskar, about Jihad and social welfare, in collaboration with Sheikh Abdur Rahim. In the book he wrote that the Muslims of India should not revolt against the British colonial government because they protected the freedom of religion of the Muslims. The Dhaka Mussalman Suhrid Sammilani, a pro-women's education movement, asked him to write a book for young girls. He wrote Tuhfatul Moslemin for them. He also taught Persian language at the Doveton College, Calcutta.

== Legacy ==
Ahmad was an influential figure in the Muslim literary society of Kolkata. In 1890, Mohammad Mozammel Huq, the poet, dedicated his book, Ferdousi Charita, to Ahmad.
