= Reazuddin Ahmad Mashadi =

Bengali Muslim writer

Reazuddin Ahmad Mashadi was a Bengali Muslim writer and philosopher.

== Early life ==
Mashadi was born in 1859 in Charan, Ratanganj, Tangail District, Bengal Presidency, British Raj. He learned Bengali, English, Sanskrit, and Urdu.

== Career ==
Mashadi joined an aliya madrasa in Calcutta as the professor of Bengali and Sanskrit in 1886. He published Prabandha Kaumudi in 1892. He worked at the aliya madrasa for seven years. He was involved in the literary scene in Calcutta and worked with Mearajuddin Ahmad, Muhammad Reazuddin Ahmad, and Sheikh Abdur Rahim. Together they created an Islamic literary scene in Bengal. He published Theories of Islam: Volume One in 1888 and published volume two in 1889. He was involved in the publication of The Sudhakar, a Muslim weekly.

Mashadi published Samaj O Samskarak in 1889 and Agnikukkut in 1890 about the cultural heritage of Muslims with the intention to prevent the conversion of Muslims. His book Samaj O Samskarak was about the life of Pan-Islamist Jamāl al-Dīn al-Afghānī was banned by the British Colonial government. He wrote Suriya Bijay in 1895. He joined the estate of Abdul Karim Ghaznavi replacing the former manager and writer Mir Mosharraf Hossain in 1900. He published a journal called Siddhanta Panjika.

== Death ==
Mashadi died on 20 September 1918.
