= Asian Squash Federation =

Asian governing body for the sport of squash

- Abbreviation: ASF
- Formation: 1980
- Type: Sports organization
- Headquarters: Kuala Lumpur, Malaysia
- Region served: Asia
- Members: 27 member associations
- President: (Hong Kong) Duncan Chiu
- Vice president: (India) Cyrus Poncha (Kuwait) Adel Jassim AlGhareeb (South Korea) Ryun-Hoe KOO
- Secretary general: (Hong Kong) John Wong
- Parent organization: World Squash
- Website: Asian Squash

The Asian Squash Federation was formed on 29 November 1980. The founding members were Bahrain, Bangladesh, Malaysia, Pakistan, Philippines, Singapore, and Thailand. It is affiliated to World Squash.

== Background ==
Pakistan provided the first president, the headquarters, and the secretariat. The principles and objects of the ASF are:

- To serve as the Squash management body in Asia and as such, to promote and assist in the development of the sport among its member countries.
- To uphold and enforce the principal aspects of all organisational and technical rules of the sport, as decided by the World Squash Federation and to:
  - implement the fundamental regulations for international competitive Squash; and
  - maintain a working relationship with the Olympic Council of Asia.
- To maintain the authority and autonomy of its members.
- To protect the common interests of its members through consultation and coordinated effort.
- To collect, collate and circulate information amongst its members.
- To assist members in promoting competitive Squash for the benefit of all member nations of the federation.
- To arbitrate if circumstances so demand on any Squash-related dispute amongst member countries.

== Presidents ==
No.	Years	Name
1	1980–1985	(Pakistan) M. Anwar Shamim
2	1985–1997	(Singapore) Edward Jacob
3	1997–2001	(Malaysia) Mokhzani Mahathir
4	2001–2009	(India) Narayana Ramachandran
5	2009–2013	(Malaysia) Dato' A. Sani Karim
6	2013–2024	(Hong Kong) David Y.Y. Mui
7	2025–	(Hong Kong) Duncan Chiu

== List of members ==
Nation	Federation	President
Bahrain	Bahrain Badminton & Squash Association	Hussam Bin Essa Al-Khalifa
Bangladesh	Bangladesh Squash Rackets Federation	Mushfiqur Rahman Mohan
Brunei	Brunei Squash Rackets Association	Abdul Hamid Abdullah
China	Chinese Squash Association	Zhang Xiaoning
Chinese Taipei	Squash Rackets Association of Chinese Taipei	Charles-C.Y.Chen
Hong Kong	Squash Association of Hong Kong, China	David Y Y Mui
India	Squash Rackets Federation of India	K.S.Sripathi
Indonesia	Persatuan Squash Indonesia	Syarif Bastaman
Iran	Iran Squash Federation	Masoud Soleimani
Iraq	Iraqi Squash Federation	Ali Jihad Ramadhan
Japan	Japan Squash Association	Totsumi Fujigasaki
Jordan	Jordan Squash Federation	Ramzi Ali Tabbalat
South Korea	Korea Squash Federation	WonKwan Kim
Kuwait	Kuwait Squash Federation	Hussain A. Al Maqsseed
Lebanon	Lebanese Squash Federation	Mahmoud El Badawi
Macau	Associacao De Squash De Macau	Cheung Lup Kwan
Malaysia	Squash Racquets Association Of Malaysia	Dato' Syed Mustaffa Syed Ali
Nepal	Nepal Squash Rackets Federation	Kishore Maharjan
Oman	Squash Federation of Oman	Ahmad ben Hashill Al-Muscarry
Pakistan	Pakistan Squash Federation	Tahir Raffique Butt
Palestine	Palestine Squash Federation	Mohammed Abou-Loughad
Philippines	Squash Rackets Association of the Philippines	Romeo M Ribano
Qatar	Qatar Squash Federation	Nasser Al-Khelaïfi
Saudi Arabia	Saudi Squash Federation	Tareq Al Tameme
Singapore	Singapore Squash Rackets Association	Desmond Hill
Sri Lanka	Sri Lanka Squash Federation	Palitha Weerasinghe
Thailand	Thailand Squash Rackets Association	Patee Sarasin

== Tournaments ==
Senior events

Tournament	Latest	Champions	Next
Asian Individual Championships	2025	(Hong Kong) Lau Tsz Kwan (Hong Kong) Ho Tze Lok	2027
Asian Doubles Championships	2025	(India) Abhay Singh; Velavan Senthilkumar (India) Anahat Singh; Joshna Chinappa (India) Anahat Singh; Abhay Singh	2026
Asian Team Championships	2024	Malaysia; Malaysia	2026

Junior events

- Asian Junior Individual Championships
- Asian Junior Team Championships

Master events

- Asian Masters Championships

== Awards ==
- ASF Awards

== See also ==
- Asian Games
- Asian Individual Squash Championships
- Asian Squash Team Championships
