= Chinese Squash Association =

Governing body of squash in China

- Sport: Squash
- Regional affiliation: Asian Squash Federation
- Location: Chongwen District, Beijing
- President: Zhang Xiaoning
- Secretary: Wang Li Wei

Official website
- squash.sport.org.cn
- (China)

Chinese Squash Association is the National Organisation for Squash in China.
