= Cyrus Poncha =

Indian squash coach

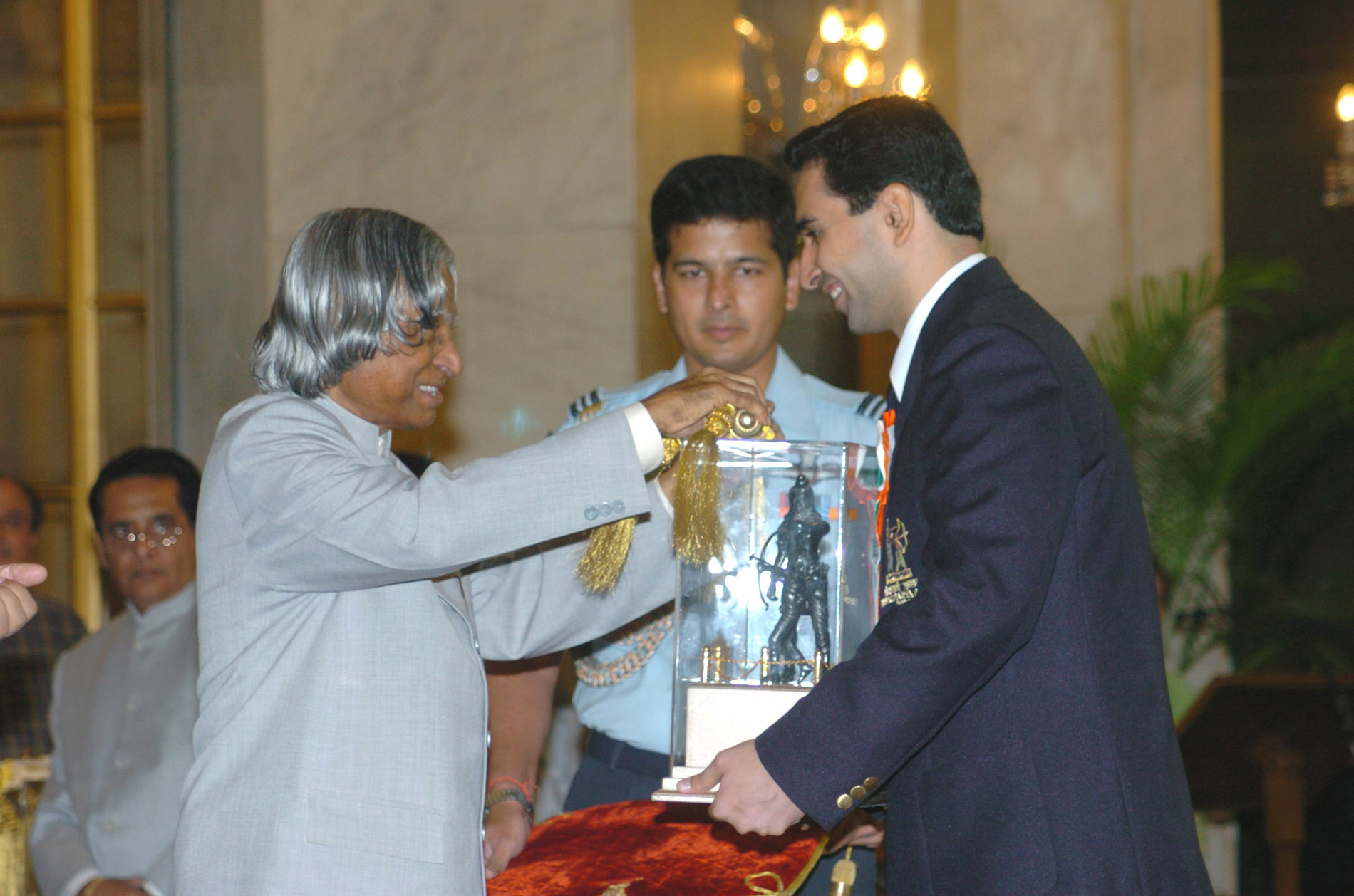
- President A.P.J. Abdul Kalam presenting the Dronacharya Award to Cyrus Poncha, in New Delhi on 29 August 2005
- Born: Mumbai, India
- Occupations: Secretary General of Squash Rackets Federation of India, Squash coach
- Years active: 2000–present

Cyrus Poncha is an Indian squash administrator and coach and former junior squash player. Born in Mumbai, he is currently based out of Chennai, and coaches at the ICL-TNSRA Squash Academy. Presently, he is the Secretary General of Squash Rackets Federation of India. He is a Dronacharya Awardee. He was adjudged Asian Squash Federation Coach of the Year six times. He has coached several squash players such as Joshna Chinappa, Dipika Pallikal Karthik, Saurav Ghoshal and Velavan Senthilkumar.

== Early life and career ==
Cyrus was born in Mumbai. Cyrus was a nationally ranked junior plater but took up coaching instead of becoming a professional on the squash circuit. However, he started coaching other squash players at the age of 18. He moved to Chennai to work under S. Maniam, a Malaysian coach in ICL-TNSRA Squash Academy in 2000. Soon after, he became the national head coach of Squash Rackets Federation of India (SRFI), which is the governing body of squash in India. In 2005, he was awarded the Dronacharya Award, the highest honour for sport coaches in India by then Indian President A.P.J. Abdul Kalam. He has also won the 'Coach of the Year' from Asian Squash Federation award six times in 2016, 2004, 2009, 2012, 2014 and 2016.

He has obtained WSF level-III coaching certificate and coached players both the junior squash and senior circuits. Players he has coached include Joshna Chinappa, Dipika Pallikal Karthik, Saurav Ghoshal, Anaka Alankamony, Kush Kumar, Harinder Pal Sandhu and Velavan Senthilkumar among others. Joshna Chinappa and Dipika Pallikal Karthik have won gold in 2014 Commonwealth games and are in the top 20 of Women's Squash World Ranking.

In June 2019, he was elected as the new Secretary General of SRFI. He will hold the position for four years, until 2023.

== Awards ==
- Dronacharya Award, 2005
- Asian Squash Federation 'Coach of the Year' award, 2016, 2004, 2009, 2012, 2014 (as team coach), 2016
