= Anwara Bahar Chowdhury =

- Born: 13 February 1919
- Died: 27 October 1987 (aged 68)
- Spouse: Habibullah Bahar Chowdhury
- Children: Iqbal Bahar Chowdhury; Selina Bahar Zaman

Anwara Bahar Chowdhury (13 February 1919 – 27 October 1987) was a Bangladeshi social activist and writer.

== Background and education ==
Chowdhury was born on 13 February 1919 in the town of Azizganj in the Murshidabad district, and brought up in the Manikganj district. She was admitted to Sakhawat Memorial Girls' High School, established by women's rights activist Begum Rokeya. She passed the matriculation exam in 1934. She completed her higher secondary school examination and BA degree from Bethune College of Kolkata. She passed Bachelor in Teaching from Scottish Church College in 1941.

== Career ==
Chowdhury was a professor of Bengali literature at Lady Brabourne College of the University of Calcutta. She became Secretary of Anjuman-e-Khawatin-e-Islam, or the All Bengal Muslim Women's Association established by Begum Rokeya. She served as the Headmistress of Vidyamoyee Girls' High School, Kamrunnesa Girls' High School and Bangla Bazar Government Girls' High School.

In 1955, she became a Special Officer of Women's Education at the Education Directorate. She was one of the founders of Bulbul Academy of Fine Arts (BAFA), established in Dhaka in 1955. She established Habibullah Bahar College in 1969.

Choudhury wrote several books which include biographies, school textbooks and books for children. She published her collection of poems, "Amar Chetonar Rang".

== Personal life ==
Chowdhury was married to politician Habibullah Bahar Chowdhury. She had 3 daughters – Selina Bahar Zaman, Nasreen Shams and Tazeen Chowdhury and one son - Iqbal Bahar Chowdhury. A documentary on Chowhdury's life was made by her son Iqbal.
