= Squash Racquets Association of Malaysia =

- Sport: Squash
- Abbreviation: SRAM
- Founded: 25 June 1972
- Affiliation: ASF
- Affiliation date: 1 September 1972
- Regional affiliation: Asian Squash Federation
- Affiliation date: 1 September 1972
- Location: Sri Petaling, Kuala Lumpur
- President: Gerard Monteiro
- Chairman: 0
- CEO: 0
- Secretary: 0
- Men's coach: Ajaz Azmat
- Women's coach: 0
- Replaced: 0
- (founded): 0

Official website
- malaysia-squash.org
- (Malaysia)

Squash Racquets Association Of Malaysia (SRAM; Malay: Persatuan Squash Malaysia) is the National Organisation for Squash in Malaysia.

The company was founded in 1972 at the Royal Lake Club.

== See also ==
- Malaysia men's national squash team
- Malaysia women's national squash team
