= Shamsunnahar Mahmud =

Bangladeshi politician

Begum Shamsunnahar Mahmud
- শামসুন্নাহার মাহমুদ
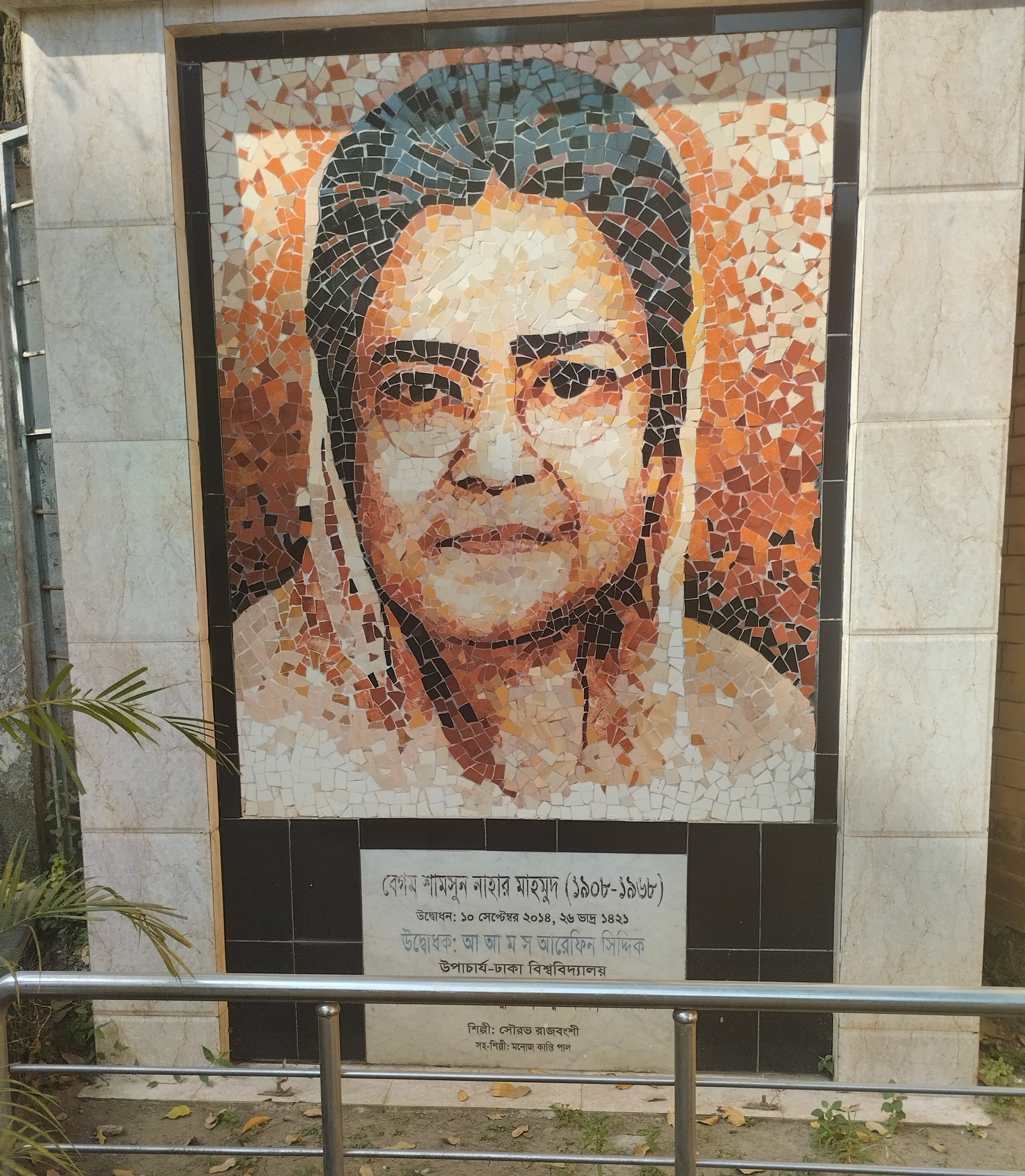
- Mosaic portrait of Mahmud at Shamsunnahar Hall at the University of Dhaka

Member of 3rd National Assembly
- In office 1962–1965
- President: Ayub Khan
- Succeeded by: Dolly Azad
- Constituency: NE-77 (Women's Reserved Seat-II)

Personal details
- Born: 1908 Guthuma, Bengal Province, British India
- Died: 10 April 1964 (aged 55–56) Dacca, East Pakistan, Pakistan
- Children: Mamun Mahmud
- Parent: Mohammad Nurullah
- Relatives: Abdul Aziz (grandfather), Habibullah Bahar Chowdhury (brother)
- Education: Dr. Khastagir Government Girls' High School; Diocesan College
- Occupation: Writer, politician and educator

Shamsunnahar Mahmud (c. 1908 — April 10, 1964) was a writer, politician and educator in Bengal during the early 20th century. She was a leader of the women's rights movement in Bengal pioneered by Begum Rokeya. Shamsunnahar Hall of the University of Dhaka and University of Chittagong was named after her.

== Early life and education ==
Mahmud was born in 1908 in North Guthuma village, in what is now Parshuram Upazila of Feni District, Bangladesh. Her father, Mohammad Nurullah, was a munsiff. Khan Bahadur Abdul Aziz was her grandfather. Her brother, Habibullah Bahar Chowdhury was a politician.

Mahmud started her studies at Dr. Khastagir Government Girls' School in Chittagong, and matriculated in 1926 as a private candidate. She received her I.A. in 1928 and B.A. in 1932 at the Diocesan College of Calcutta. In 1942, she completed her M.A. in Bengali literature. After her studies she joined the women's rights movement led by Begum Rokeya.

== Career ==
Mahmud started her career as a teacher of Bengali literature at Lady Brabourne College. She worked as secretary to the Nikhil Banga Muslim Mahila Samity (All Bengal Muslim Women's Society). She visited Turkey and the Middle East as a representative of East Pakistan in 1952. She was elected member of the National Assembly in 1962.

In 1961, she initiated the establishment of "The Centre for the Rehabilitation of Disabled Children". She led a delegation to the International Council of Women in Colombo and joined the International Friendship Organization as Asia's regional director.

== Personal life ==
She married Wahiduddin Mahmud in 1927. They had met in Calcutta two years ago when she was a teenager. He was the Surgeon General of then East Pakistan. Together they had two sons, Mamun Mahmud, a martyred freedom fighter during the 1971 Liberation war of Bangladesh, and Mainuddin Mahmud, a cricketer, and sports enthusiast.

== Works ==
Mahmud's first poem was published in a juvenile monthly magazine, Angur. She edited the women's sections of the magazines, Nauroj and Atmashakti. Together with her brother, Habibullah, she edited the magazine Bulbul (1933) which was published from Kolkata.

=== Books ===
- Punyamayi (1925)
- Phulbagicha (1935)
- Begum Mahal (1936)
- Roquia Jibani (1937; the first biography of Begum Rokeya)
- Shishur Shiksa (1939)
- Amar Dekha Turaska (1956)
- Nazrulke Jeman Dekhechhi (1958)

== Legacy ==
After Mahmud's death, the women's hall of the University of Dhaka, University of Chittagong were named Shamsunnahar Hall. She was awarded Independence Day Award in 1981 by the Government of Bangladesh for her contribution to social work.
