= Anisuzzaman =

Bangladeshi academic (1937–2020)

- আনিসুজ্জামান
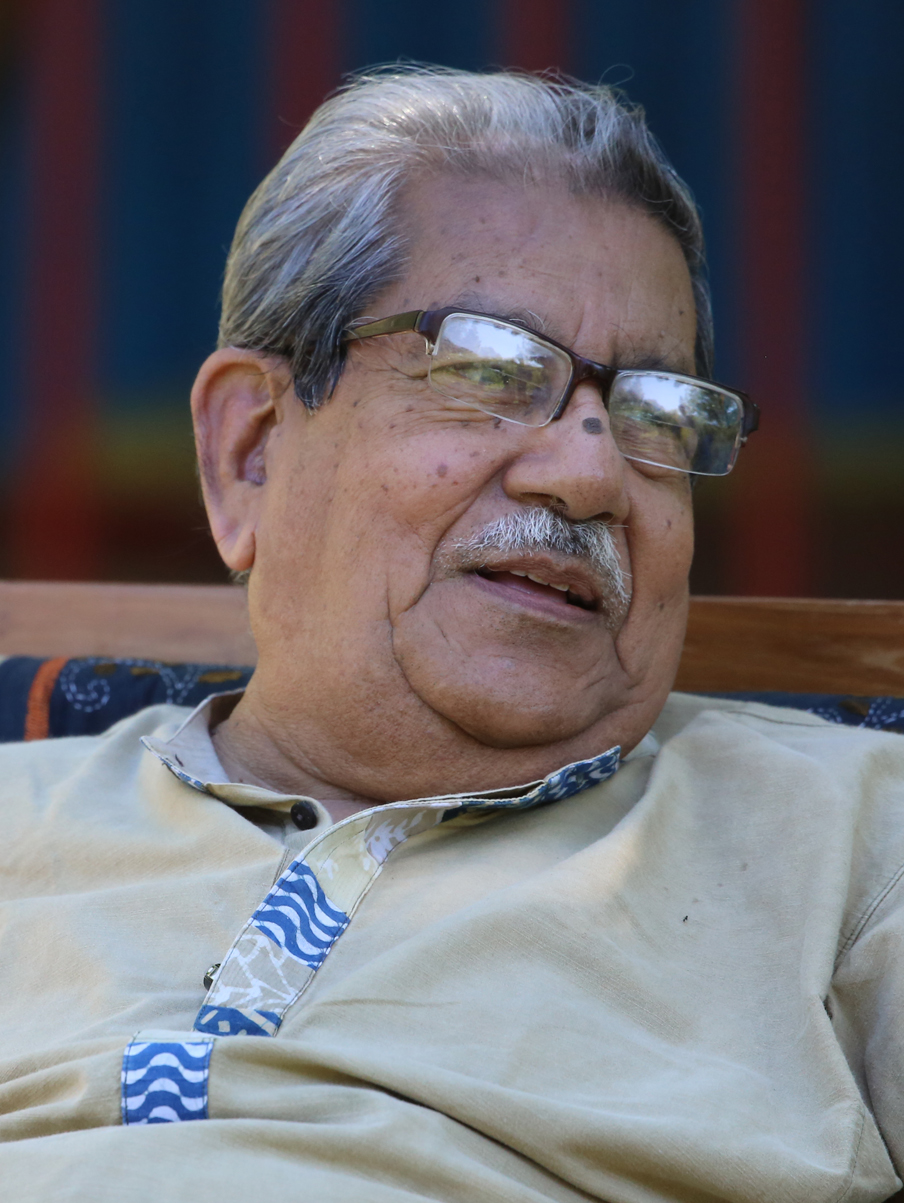
- Anisuzzaman in 2016

President of Bangla Academy
- In office 13 December 2012 – 14 May 2020
- Preceded by: Kabir Chowdhury
- Succeeded by: Shamsuzzaman Khan
- In office 19 August 1999 – 31 January 2002
- Preceded by: Shamsur Rahman
- Succeeded by: Wakil Ahmed

Personal details
- Born: Abu Tayyab Muhammad Anisuzzaman; 18 February 1937 Basirhat, 24 Parganas, Bengal Province, British India
- Died: 14 May 2020 (aged 83) Dhaka, Bangladesh
- Relations: Sheikh Abdur Rahim (grandfather)
- Education: University of Dhaka
- Occupation: Activist; author; administrator
- Awards: Full list

Abu Tayyab Muhammad Anisuzzaman (18 February 1937 – 14 May 2020) was a Bangladeshi academic of Bengali literature. He was an activist who took part in the Language Movement (1952), participated in the Mass Uprising (1969), and took part in the Bangladesh Liberation War (1971).

Anisuzzaman served as a member of the Planning Commission to the Government of Bangladesh during the Bangladesh liberation war and a member of the National Education Commission set up by the government after liberation. He was inducted as a National Professor by the Government of Bangladesh in 2018. He was appointed as the president of Bangla Academy for four terms and served until his death.

== Early life and education ==
Abu Tayyab Muhammad Anisuzzaman was born on 18 February 1937 to a Bengali family of Muslim Sheikhs in Basirhat, 24 Parganas, Bengal Presidency. Along with his family, he moved to Khulna after the 1947 partition. After about a year they moved to Dhaka. His father, ATM Moazzem, was a homeopathy practitioner and his grandfather, Sheikh Abdur Rahim, was a journalist and writer. His first piece of writing, a story, was published in Nowbahar, a literary magazine, in 1950. He completed his HSC at Jagannath College. He obtained his bachelor's in 1956 and his master's in 1957 in Bengali from the University of Dhaka. At the university, he worked with Muhammad Shahidullah, Muhammad Abdul Hye and Munier Chowdhury. He completed his Ph.D. in 1962 at the age of 25 at the same university. He was a post-doctoral fellow at the University of Chicago during 1964–65 and a Commonwealth Academic Staff fellow at the University of London (1974–75).

== Career ==
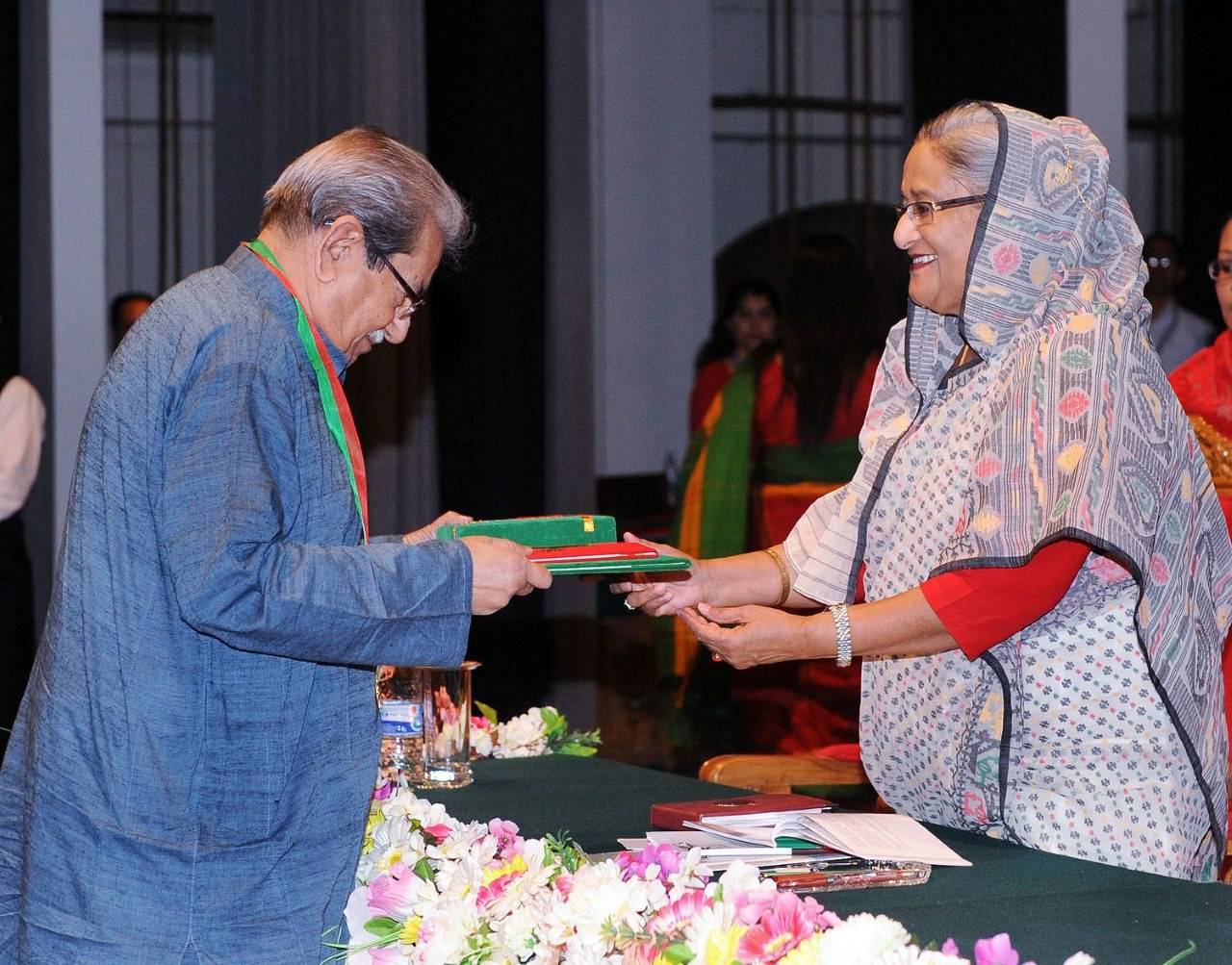
with the Prime Minister of BGD, Sheikh Hasina

Anisuzzaman served as a faculty member at the University of Dhaka during 1959–69, 1985–2003 and 2005–08. He taught Bengali at the University of Chittagong during 1969–85. From 1978 to 1983, he was associated with research projects at the United Nations University. He was a visiting fellow at the University of Paris (1994), North Carolina State University (1995) and the University of Calcutta (2010), and a visiting professor at the Visva-Bharati (2008–09, 2011).

Anisuzzaman was a member of the Planning Commission of the Government of Bangladesh during the Bangladesh liberation war and a member of the National Education Commission set up by the government after liberation. He was responsible for the Bengali language part of the Constitution of Bangladesh adopted in November 1972. He served as Chairman of the Trustee Board of the Nazrul Institute and has been the president of the Bangla Academy since 2011.

== Activism ==
Anisuzzaman took part in the Language Movement (1952), participated in the Mass Uprising (1969), took part in the War of Liberation (1971) and was the secretary of the Bangladesh Teachers' Association in 1971. He was involved in the anti-autocracy movement (1990).

In 2015, Anisuzzaman received death threats from Islamic extremists.

== Literary works ==
- Muslim Manos O Bangla Sahitya (1964)
- Munir Chowdhury (1975)
- Swaruper Sandhane (1976)
- Adharo Sotoker Bangla Cithi (1983)
- Purono Bangla Gadya (1984)
- Aamar Ekattor (1997)
- Muktijudho Ebong Tarpor (1998)
- Aamar Chokh (1999)
- Bangali Nari : Sahittye o Somaje (2000)
- Kaal Nirobodhi (2003)
- Factory correspondence and other Bengali Documents in the India office Library and Records (1981)
- Creativity, Identity and Reality (1991)
- Cultural Pluralism (1993)
- Identity, Religion and Recent history (1995)

== Awards ==
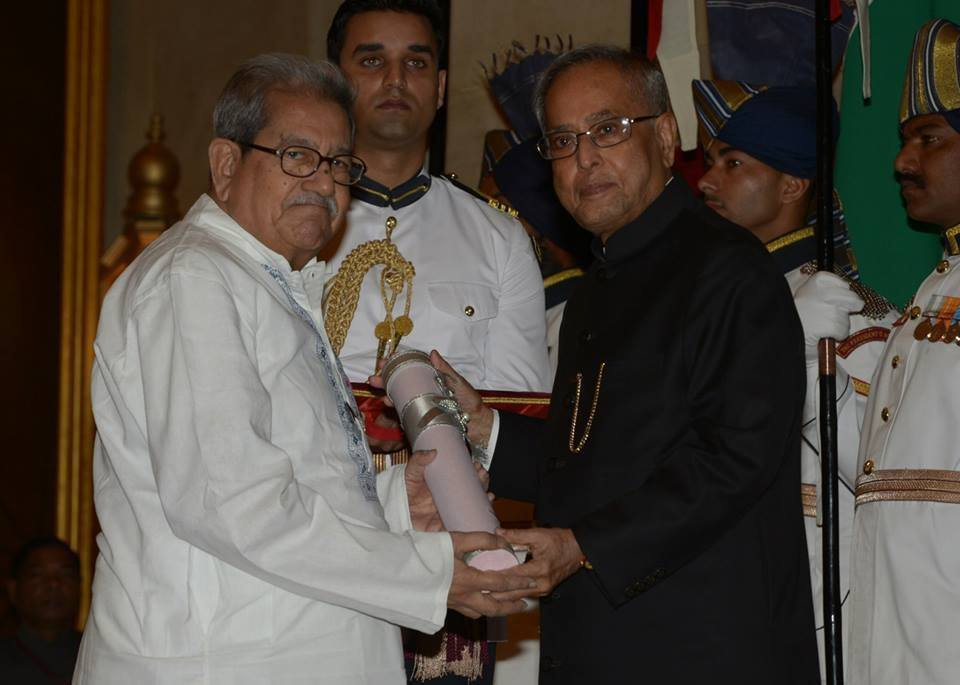
Anisuzzaman receiving the Padma Bhusan award from the Indian President Pranab Mukherjee

- Bangla Academy Literary Award for research (1970)
- Ekushey Padak, an award given by the State, for his contribution to education (1985)
- Ananda Puraskar for publishing a series of 14 cassettes titled Oitijjher Ongikar (1994)
- Honorary D.Lit, Rabindra Bharati University, Calcutta (2005)
- Sarojini Basu Award, University of Calcutta (2008)
- Pandit Iswarchandra Vidyasagar Gold Plaque, Asiatic Society of Kolkata (2011)
- Padma Bhushan, on contribution of literature and education (2014)
- Independence Day Award for literature in 2015 by the Government of Bangladesh
- Nilkanta Sarkar Gold Medal, University of Dhaka
- Dawood Prize for literature, Pakistan Writers' Guild
- Star Lifetime Award (2016)
- Ananda Puraskar for his autobiography Bipula Prithibi (The Vast World) (2017)
- Jagattarini Medal, The University of Calcutta
- Khan Bahadur Ahsanullah Gold Medal 2018
- SAARC (South Asian Association for Regional Cooperation) Literature Award 2019

== Personal life ==
Anisuzzaman was married to Siddiqua Zaman. He was a secular humanist, having lost faith in organised religion during his youth.

=== Death ===
Anisuzzaman died from multi organ failure at Combined Military Hospital in Dhaka on 14 May 2020. He was admitted to Universal Medical College Hospital after falling sick about three weeks prior to his death. Later he was shifted to CMH as his condition was not improving. Sample was collected for COVID-19 test after his death and it came positive. He is buried at Azimpur Graveyard in Dhaka in line with the guidelines for the burial of COVID-19 patients during the COVID-19 pandemic in Bangladesh.
