= Iqbal Bahar Chowdhury =

Bangladeshi news presenter, elocutionist and voice actor

Iqbal Bahar Choudhury
- ইকবাল বাহার চৌধুরী
- Born: 1940 (age 85–86)
- Education: University of Dhaka
- Occupation: News broadcaster
- Years active: 1949–2010
- Parents: Habibullah Bahar Chowdhury (father); Anwara Bahar Chowdhury (mother)

Iqbal Bahar Choudhury (born 1940) is a Bangladeshi news presenter, elocutionist and voice actor. He served as the head of the Bangla Service, Voice of America during 1972–2010.

== Family background and early life ==
Choudhury was born in 1940. His father, Habibullah Bahar Chowdhury, was a politician and writer from East Bengal. His mother, Anwara Bahar Chowdhury (1919–1987), was an activist and writer. She was one of the founders of Bulbul Academy of Fine Arts (BAFA) in Dhaka. In the early 1960s, she worked as the deputy leader of a cultural delegation to Iran, Iraq and the former Soviet Union. Iqbal has three sisters - Selina Bahar Zaman, Nasreen Shams and Tazeen Chowdhury.

Choudhury began broadcasting in 1949, from Nazimuddin Road in Old Dhaka for Radio Pakistan Dhaka. Along with his sister, Selina, he performed in a weekly programme Khela Ghor. While he was an economics student at the University of Dhaka, he acted in the stage plays including "Eureka". He graduated from the university in 1963.

== Career ==
Chowdhury took part in radio plays with actors like Khan Ataur Rahman, Golam Mustafa, Nurunnahar Fyzennesa, Lily Chowdhury and Kafi Khan at Radio Pakistan Dhaka. In 1964, he became one of the first television news presenters in East Bengal. He presented Bangla news on state-run Bangladesh Television (BTV) during the mid-1960s. He joined Voice of America as a news presenter in 1972 and retired in 2010. In 2006, he introduced the Bengali television service in VOA.

Chowdhury published several albums of poetry recitation. He recited poems of Rabindranath Tagore and Kazi Nazrul Islam. According to him, his great-grandfather Khan Bahadur Abdul Aziz, an educationist, had a close relationship with Kazi Nazrul Islam.

Chowdhury produced two documentary films — one on Begum Rokeya Sakhawat Hossain and another on his mother Anwara Bahar Chowdhury.

== Works ==
- Praner Joybarta (2015)
- Anandolokey: Esho Natun Prithibi Gori (2007)
- Shudhu Tomar Bani (1980s)
- Sharthok Janom Amar
- Janani Bashundhara
