= Squash at the 2026 Asian Games – Women's team =

Women's team at the 2026 Asian Games
- Venue: Kinjo-Futo Arena
- Dates: 28 September – 2 October 2026
- Competitors: 43 from 11 nations

Medalists
gold medal	Malaysia; Rachel Arnold, Aifa Azman, Aira Azman, Sivasangari Subramaniam
silver medal	Hong Kong; Chan Sin Yuk, Ho Tze Lok, Lee Ka Yi, Toby Tse
bronze medal	Japan; Akari Midorikawa, Erisa Sano, Risa Sugimoto, Satomi Watanabe
bronze medal	India; Joshna Chinappa, Tanvi Khanna, Shameena Riaz, Anahat Singh

The women's team squash event was part of the squash programme and took place between 28 September and 2 October 2026, at the Nagoya Kinjo-Futo Arena.

== Schedule ==
All times are Japan Standard Time (UTC+09:00)

Date	Time	Event
Monday, 28 September 2026	10:00	Group round
Tuesday, 29 September 2026	10:00	Group round
Tuesday, 29 September 2026	14:30	Round robin
Wednesday, 30 September 2026	10:00	Round robin
Wednesday, 30 September 2026	10:00	Quarterfinals
Thursday, 1 October 2026	10:30	Semifinals
Friday, 2 October 2026	13:30	Gold medal match

== Results ==
=== Group round ===
==== Pool A ====
Pos	Team	Pld	W	L	MF	MA	Qualification
1	Malaysia	2	2	0	6	0	Quarterfinals
2	Singapore	2	1	1	2	4	Quarterfinals
3	Macau	2	0	2	1	5	Round robin

Source: Tournamentsoftware

28 September	Malaysia	3–0	Macau

Rachel Arnold	3–0	Cao Chi Cheng	11–6, 11–7, 11–8
Aira Azman	3–0	Liu Kwai Chi	11–5, 11–2, 11–2
Aifa Azman	3–0	Yeung Wai Leng	11–6, 11–3, 11–4

28 September	Singapore	2–1	Macau

Naisha Singh	3–0	Yeung Wai Leng	11–8, 13–11, 11–9
Au Yeong Wai Yhann	0–3	Yeung Weng Chi	8–11, 10–12, 10–12
Au Yeong Wai Lynn	3–0	Liu Kwai Chi	11–3, 11–5, 11–4

29 September	Malaysia	3–0	Singapore

Aira Azman	3–0	Au Yeong Wai Lynn	11–9, 11–8, 11–2
Sivasangari Subramaniam	3–0	Au Yeong Wai Yhann	11–6, 11–6, 11–5
Aifa Azman	3–0	Naisha Singh	11–0, 12–10, 11–3

==== Pool B ====
Pos	Team	Pld	W	L	MF	MA	Qualification
1	Hong Kong	3	3	0	9	0	Quarterfinals
2	South Korea	3	2	1	6	3	Quarterfinals
3	Pakistan	3	1	2	3	6	Round robin
4	Mongolia	3	0	3	0	9	

Source: Tournamentsoftware

28 September	Hong Kong	3–0	Pakistan

Toby Tse	3–0	Mehwish Ali	11–3, 11–8, 11–9
Chan Sin Yuk	3–0	Sana Bahadar	11–5, 11–1, 11–1
Ho Tze Lok	3–0	Mahnoor Ali	11–5, 11–9, 11–3

28 September	South Korea	3–0	Mongolia

Kim Da-mi	3–0	Altankhuyagiin Ariunbileg	Walkover
Heo Min-gyeong	3–0	Khasbaataryn Oyuungerel	Walkover
Ryoo Bo-ram	3–0	Bat-Erdeniin Khongorzul	Walkover

28 September	Hong Kong	3–0	South Korea

Toby Tse	3–0	Kim Da-mi	12–10, 11–2, 11–7
Chan Sin Yuk	3–0	Heo Min-gyeong	11–6, 11–7, 11–4
Ho Tze Lok	3–0	Eum Hwa-yeong	11–6, 11–8, 11–8

28 September	Pakistan	3–0	Mongolia

Mehwish Ali	3–0	Bat-Erdeniin Khongorzul	11–3, 11–2, 11–3
Sana Bahadar	3–0	Altankhuyagiin Ariunbileg	11–4, 11–0, 11–3
Mahnoor Ali	3–0	Khasbaataryn Oyuungerel	11–2, 11–2, 11–2

29 September	South Korea	3–0	Pakistan

Eum Hwa-yeong	3–0	Mahnoor Ali	11–2, 11–4, 11–7
Heo Min-gyeong	3–0	Sana Bahadar	11–5, 11–5, 11–8
Kim Da-mi	3–0	Mehwish Ali	11–3, 11–8, 11–5

29 September	Hong Kong	3–0	Mongolia

Lee Ka Yi	3–0	Bat-Erdeniin Khongorzul	11–1, 11–1, 11–1
Chan Sin Yuk	3–0	Khasbaataryn Oyuungerel	11–2, 11–5, 11–2
Ho Tze Lok	3–0	Pürevjavyn Khulan	11–1, 11–1, 11–3

==== Pool C ====
Pos	Team	Pld	W	L	MF	MA	Qualification
1	India	3	3	0	7	2	Quarterfinals
2	Japan	3	2	1	7	2	Quarterfinals
3	China	3	1	2	3	6	Round robin
4	Iran	3	0	3	1	8	

Source: Tournamentsoftware

28 September	India	2–1	China

Shameena Riaz	2–3	Yin Ziyuan	11–8, 11–6, 9–11, 9–11, 12–14
Tanvi Khanna	3–0	Zhang Yuning	11–3, 11–5, 11–5
Joshna Chinappa	3–0	Liu Ziyi	12–10, 11–4, 11–6

28 September	Japan	3–0	Iran

Risa Sugimoto	3–1	Najmeh Boushehrizadeh	1–11, 11–5, 11–9, 11–5
Satomi Watanabe	3–1	Fereshteh Eghtedari	11–4, 12–14, 11–4, 11–5
Akari Midorikawa	3–0	Narges Soltani	11–4, 11–2, 11–6

28 September	India	2–1	Japan

Joshna Chinappa	3–0	Erisa Sano	11–1, 11–8, 11–9
Anahat Singh	2–3	Satomi Watanabe	8–11, 11–8, 11–7, 8–11, 9–11
Tanvi Khanna	3–1	Akari Midorikawa	12–10, 11–9, 4–11, 12–10

28 September	China	2–1	Iran

Yin Ziyuan	3–2	Najmeh Boushehrizadeh	8–11, 11–6, 11–7, 6–11, 11–8
Zhang Yuning	1–3	Fereshteh Eghtedari	2–11, 4–11, 11–4, 6–11
Liu Ziyi	3–0	Narges Soltani	11–5, 11–7, 11–5

29 September	Japan	3–0	China

Akari Midorikawa	3–0	Cheng Linglu	11–5, 11–5, 11–3
Satomi Watanabe	3–0	Zhang Yuning	11–4, 11–2, 11–4
Risa Sugimoto	3–0	Liu Ziyi	11–5, 11–8, 11–8

29 September	India	3–0	Iran

Tanvi Khanna	3–0	Narges Soltani	11–5, 3–0, Retired
Anahat Singh	3–0	Fereshteh Eghtedari	11–5, 11–4, 11–7
Joshna Chinappa	3–0	Najmeh Boushehrizadeh	11–1, 11–3, 11–9

=== Round robin ===
Pos	Team	Pld	W	L	MF	MA	Qualification
1	China	2	2	0	4	2	Quarterfinals
2	Macau	2	1	1	4	2	Quarterfinals
3	Pakistan	2	0	2	1	5	

Source: Tournamentsoftware

29 September	Macau	3–0	Pakistan

Yeung Wai Leng	3–0	Mahnoor Ali	11–9, 11–3, 12–10
Yeung Weng Chi	3–1	Sana Bahadar	4–11, 11–6, 11–7, 11–6
Cao Chi Cheng	3–1	Sehrish Ali	4–11, 13–11, 15–13, 11–7

29 September	Macau	1–2	China

Liu Kwai Chi	0–3	Liu Ziyi	8–11, 1–11, 3–11
Yeung Weng Chi	3–0	Zhang Yuning	11–6, 11–3, 11–1
Yeung Wai Leng	2–3	Yin Ziyuan	8–11, 11–8, 11–13, 12–10, 9–11

30 September	Pakistan	1–2	China

Mahnoor Ali	0–3	Liu Ziyi	4–11, 8–11, 2–11
Sana Bahadar	3–0	Zhang Yuning	11–7, 11–9, 11–2
Sehrish Ali	0–3	Yin Ziyuan	3–11, 7–11, 3–11

=== Knockout round ===
Quarterfinals			Semifinals			Gold medal match
A1	Malaysia	2
R2	Macau	0	A1	Malaysia	2
B2	South Korea	0	C2	Japan	0
C2	Japan	2				A1	Malaysia	2
C1	India	2				B1	Hong Kong	1
A2	Singapore	0	C1	India	1
R1	China	0	B1	Hong Kong	2
B1	Hong Kong	2

==== Quarterfinals ====
30 September	Malaysia	2–0	Macau

Aira Azman	3–0	Liu Kwai Chi	11–2, 11–3, 11–4
Sivasangari Subramaniam	3–0	Yeung Weng Chi	11–6, 11–8, 11–9

30 September	South Korea	0–2	Japan

Eum Hwa-yeong	0–3	Akari Midorikawa	9–11, 7–11, 8–11
Heo Min-gyeong	0–3	Satomi Watanabe	2–11, 5–11, 1–11

30 September	India	2–0	Singapore

Tanvi Khanna	3–1	Au Yeong Wai Lynn	11–6, 4–11, 15–13, 11–1
Anahat Singh	3–0	Au Yeong Wai Yhann	11–7, 11–3, 11–4

30 September	China	0–2	Hong Kong

Liu Ziyi	0–3	Lee Ka Yi	4–11, 3–11, 4–11
Zhang Yuning	0–3	Chan Sin Yuk	6–11, 4–11, 0–11

==== Semifinals ====
1 October	Malaysia	2–0	Japan

Sivasangari Subramaniam	3–2	Satomi Watanabe	5–11, 11–7, 5–11, 11–6, 11–3
Aira Azman	3–0	Akari Midorikawa	11–8, 11–5, 11–3

1 October	India	1–2	Hong Kong

Anahat Singh	2–3	Chan Sin Yuk	11–9, 11–8, 6–11, 11–13, 10–12
Tanvi Khanna	3–1	Lee Ka Yi	4–11, 13–11, 11–9, 13–11
Joshna Chinappa	0–3	Ho Tze Lok	4–11, 7–11, 9–11

==== Gold medal match ====
2 October	Malaysia	2–1	Hong Kong

Aifa Azman	3–0	Ho Tze Lok	11–9, 11–9, 12–10
Sivasangari Subramaniam	2–3	Chan Sin Yuk	7–11, 11–9, 11–9, 5–11, 7–11
Aira Azman	3–0	Lee Ka Yi	11–9, 11–5, 11–4

== Non-participating athletes ==
- Jayna Lim (SGP)
