= Soltan (newspaper) =

Soltan (pronounced originally as 'chol tan) was a historic newspaper of the Bengali Muslim community. It was based in Chittagong.

== History ==
Soltan was founded in 1903 and financed by Mirza Muhammad Yusuf Ali, the author of Shaubhagya Sparshamani. The founding editor of the newspaper was Maniruzzaman Islamabadi. The newspaper wrote about issues facing the Muslim world. It stopped publication in 1904, but was revived in 1926 and continued publication until 1928. The newspaper reflected the liberal views of its editor, Maniruzzaman Islamabadi. The newspaper was also a supporter of the Swadeshi movement.
