= Bangladesh Squash Racket Federation =

Sports governing body

- Formation: 1978
- Headquarters: Dhaka, Bangladesh
- Region served: Bangladesh
- Official language: Bengali
- Website: bangladeshsquash.org

The Bangladesh Squash Racket Federation is the national federation for squash and is responsible for governing the sport in Bangladesh. Faruk Khan, member of parliament, is the President of Bangladesh Squash Racket Federation. Brig Gen G M Quamrul Islam, SPP (R) is the Secretary General of the Bangladesh Squash Racket Federation.

== History ==
The Bangladesh Squash Racket Federation was established in 1978.
