= Habibullah Bahar College =

Private college of Dhaka

- হাবীবুল্লাহ বাহার কলেজ
- Other name: HBUC
- Motto: Knowledge Brings Unity.
- Type: Private
- Established: 1969
- Founder: Anwara Bahar Chowdhury
- Affiliations: Bangladesh National University; Board of Intermediate and Secondary Education, Dhaka
- Chairman: Professor Dr. Md. Taufiqul Islam
- Principal: Md. Ferdous Hasan
- Location: Shantinagar, Dhaka, Bangladesh; 23.7404°N 90.4105°E
- Campus: Urban, 1 acre (0.40 ha)
- Language: Bengali and English
- Website: hbuc.edu.bd
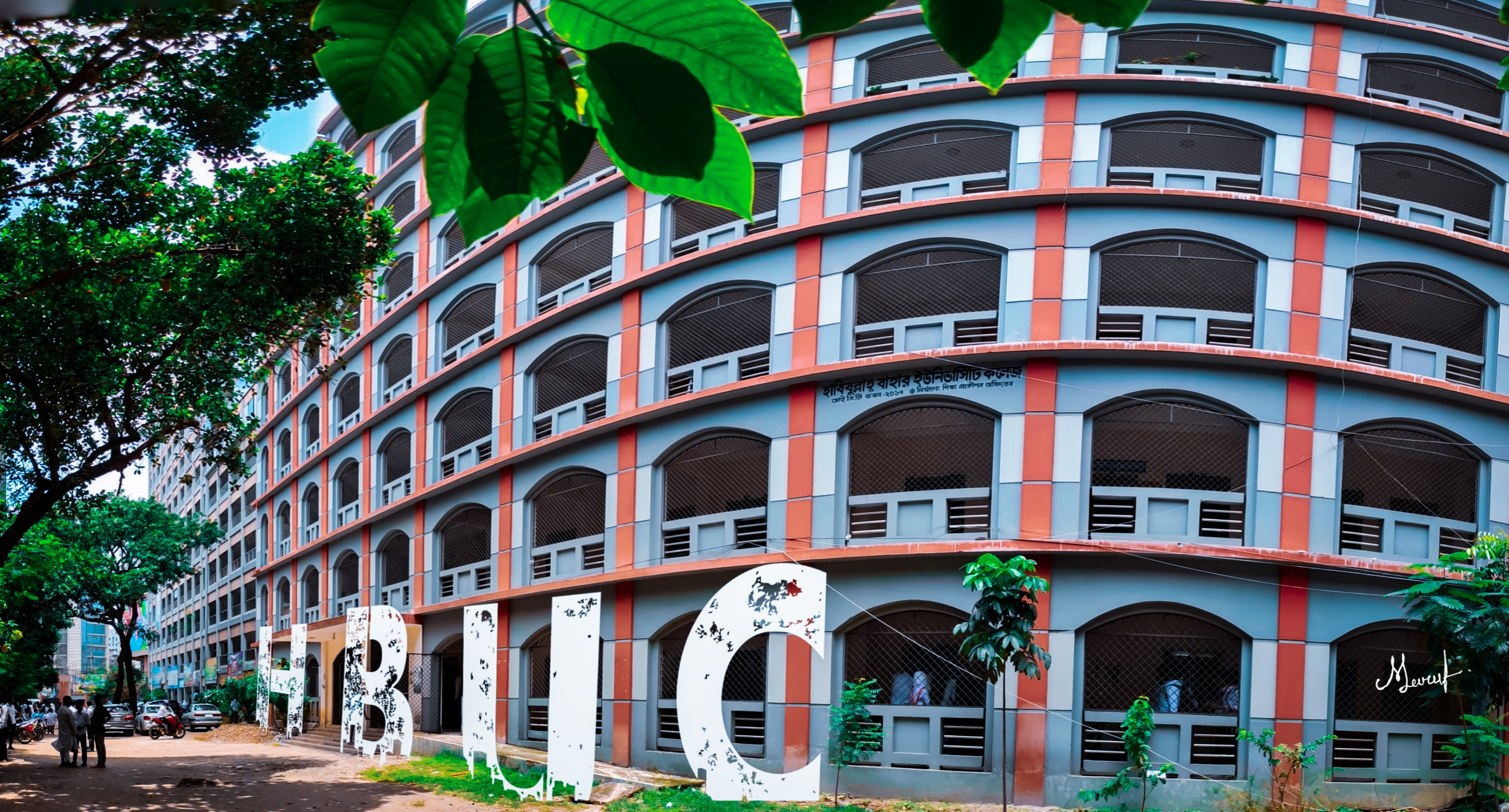

Habibullah Bahar College (Bengali: হাবীবুল্লাহ বাহার কলেজ) is a college in Dhaka, Bangladesh.

== History ==
Habibullah Bahar College was founded in 1969. Habibullah Bahar College is located at Shantinagar, at the Dhaka city centre.

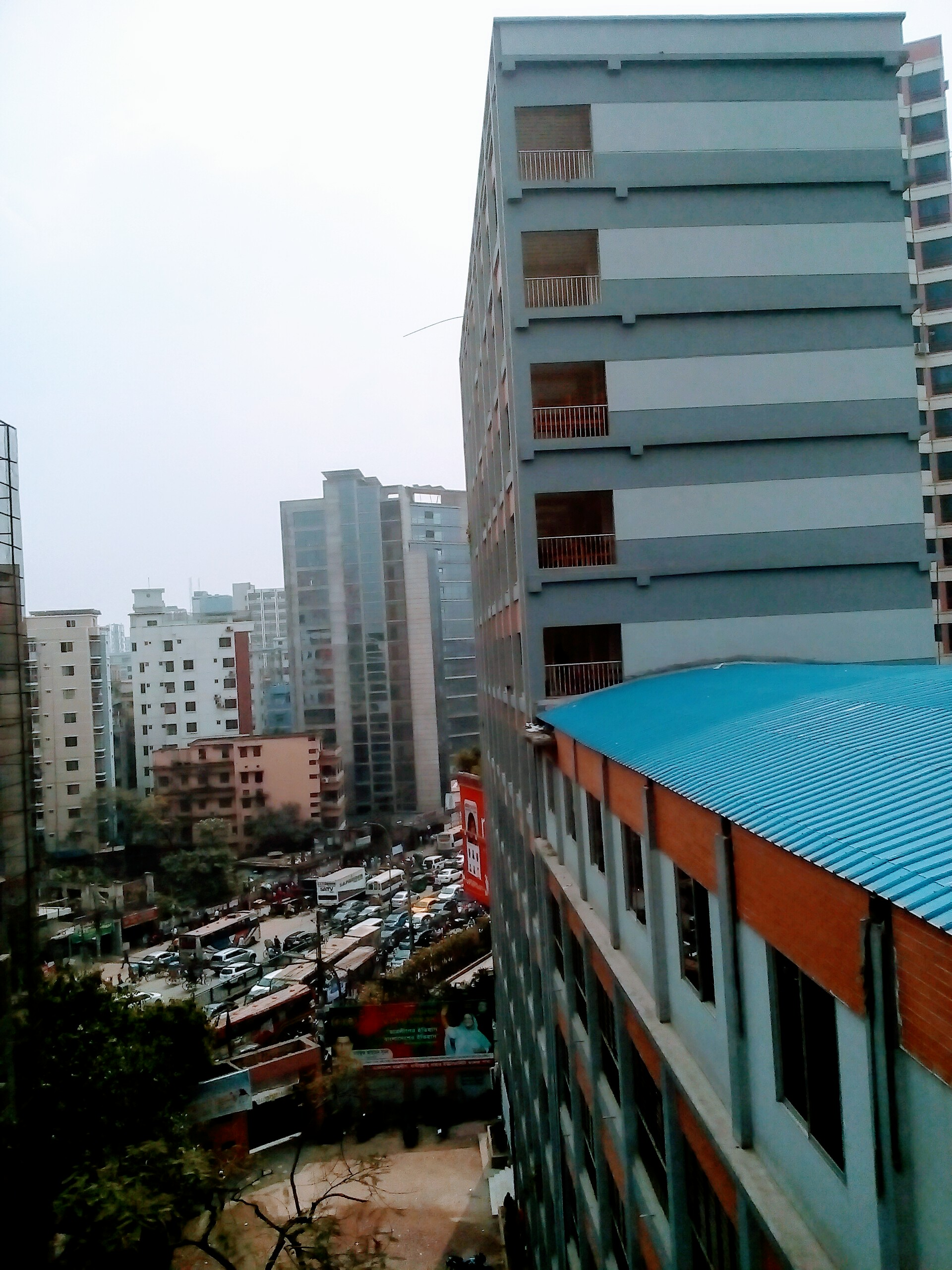
Twelve storied building of the college.

Habibullah Bahar College is a university college since it now offers honours and master's courses on 27 subjects under the National University. Established on over 1 acre (4,000 m^{2}) of land, there are five multi-storied buildings, one 12-storied building, two eight-storied buildings, and various other buildings in the compound.

In March 2025, Md Saifur Rahman Bhuiyan, vice-principal of the college was murdered in his home.

== Academic departments ==
- Faculty of Arts
  - Arabic and Islamic Studies
  - Bengali
  - Islamic History & culture
  - English
  - History
  - Philosophy

- Faculty of Social Science
  - Economics
  - Political Science
  - Sociology
  - Social Work

- Faculty of Business Administration
  - BBA (Professional)
  - Accounting
  - Finance and Banking
  - Management
  - Marketing
  - Tourism and Hospitality Management

- Faculty of Engineering (Professional)
  - Computer Science and Engineering (CSE)

- Faculty of Science
  - Botany
  - Zoology
  - Chemistry
  - Biochemistry and Molecular Biology
  - Physics
  - Mathematics
  - Statistics
  - Geography and Environment
  - Psychology

== Co-curricular activities ==
- HBUC Blood Donation Club
- Debate Club
