= Dhaka Mussalman Suhrid Sammilani =

Dhaka Mussalman Suhrid Sammilani (transl. Dhaka Muslim Friends Conference) was a reformist organization of Muslims based in Dhaka during the late 19th century.

== History ==
Dhaka Mussalman Suhrid Sammilani was established in 1883 by Muslim students of Dhaka College. Himmat Ali was the founding president and Abdul Aziz was the founding secretary of the organization. The organization was also known by two other names, Anjuman-e-Ahbab-e-Islamia and Dacca Muhammadan Friends' Union. The founders were followers of Ubaidullah Al Ubaidi Suhrawardy. The organization was focused on improving the education of Muslims, especially Muslim women. The organization provided schooling for standard one to five students. In 1889 prominent Muslims of Dhaka, such as the superintendent of Madrasahs in Dhaka, Abul Khair Mohammad Siddique, and Kazi Raziuddin, a Zamindar, and Syed Awlad Hossain. The organization was closed following the partition of Bengal into East Bengal and West Bengal on 16 December 1905. It was succeeded by Mohammedan Provincial Union.
