= Squash at the South Asian Games =

- Frequency: Every four years
- Inaugurated: 1998 (Pakistan) Islamabad
- Most recent: 2019 (Nepal) Lalitpur
- Next event: 2026 (Pakistan) Karachi

Squash was first hosted at the South Asian Games in 1989 and has been regularly hosted since the 2016 edition.

== History ==
Squash was first contested in 1989 at the South Asian Games but a men's only event was hosted. Its second appearance at the multi-sport event came in 2004 where matches for both men and women were held. Squash has since featured in the 2006, 2010 (men's matches only), 2016, and 2019.

== Medal table ==
Rank	Nation	Gold	Silver	Bronze	Total
1	Pakistan	12	6	7	25
2	India	9	12	8	29
3	Sri Lanka	0	2	10	12
4	Bangladesh	0	1	1	2
5	Nepal	0	0	6	6
6	Bhutan	0	0	0	0
6	Maldives	0	0	0	0
Totals (7 entries)		21	21	32	74
