= Abdul Aziz (writer) =

Bengali educationist, writer and social worker

Khan Bahadur Abdul Aziz
- Born: 1863; Parshuram, Feni, Bengal Presidency, British India
- Died: 1926 (aged 62–63)
- Citizenship: British India
- Education: Dhaka College
- Occupations: Educationist, writer, social worker
- Notable work: Establishment of Dhaka Mussalman Suhrid Sammilani, Mussalman Shiksa Sabha
- Parent: Amzad Ali (Father)
- Relatives: Habibullah Bahar Chowdhury (grandchild), Shamsunnahar Mahmud (grandchild)
- Awards: Khan Bahadur

Khan Bahadur Abdul Aziz (1863–1926) was an educationist, writer and social worker from Bengal Presidency.

== Early life and career ==
Aziz was born into a Bengali Muslim family in Parshuram, Feni which was then in Noakhali District, Bengal Presidency. His father, Amjad Ali, was a personal assistant to the Commissioner of Chittagong division. Aziz graduated from Dhaka College in 1886. He was the first graduate of Chittagong Division. He started his career as a teacher at the Education Department of the Provincial Government. Later he became sub-inspector of schools.

In 1883, he established the "Dhaka Mussalman Suhrid Sammilani" and later "Mussalman Shiksa Sabha" in Chittagong. He founded Victoria Islam Hostel, Kabiruddin Memorial Library, Free Islamia Reading Room and Anjumane Ashate Islam (1896).

== Literary works ==
Aziz wrote Ubedi Biyog, Kavita Kalika (1885) and Mayadnol Ulum (1892).

== Personal life ==
Two of the grandchildren of Aziz were Habibullah Bahar Chowdhury and Shamsunnahar Mahmud. Poet Kazi Nazrul Islam composed an elegy "Banglar Aziz" (Aziz of Bengal) on Aziz's death. British government awarded him Khan Bahadur in recognition of his services.
