= Mohammed Riaz =

Indian field hockey player

Mohammed Riaz OLY
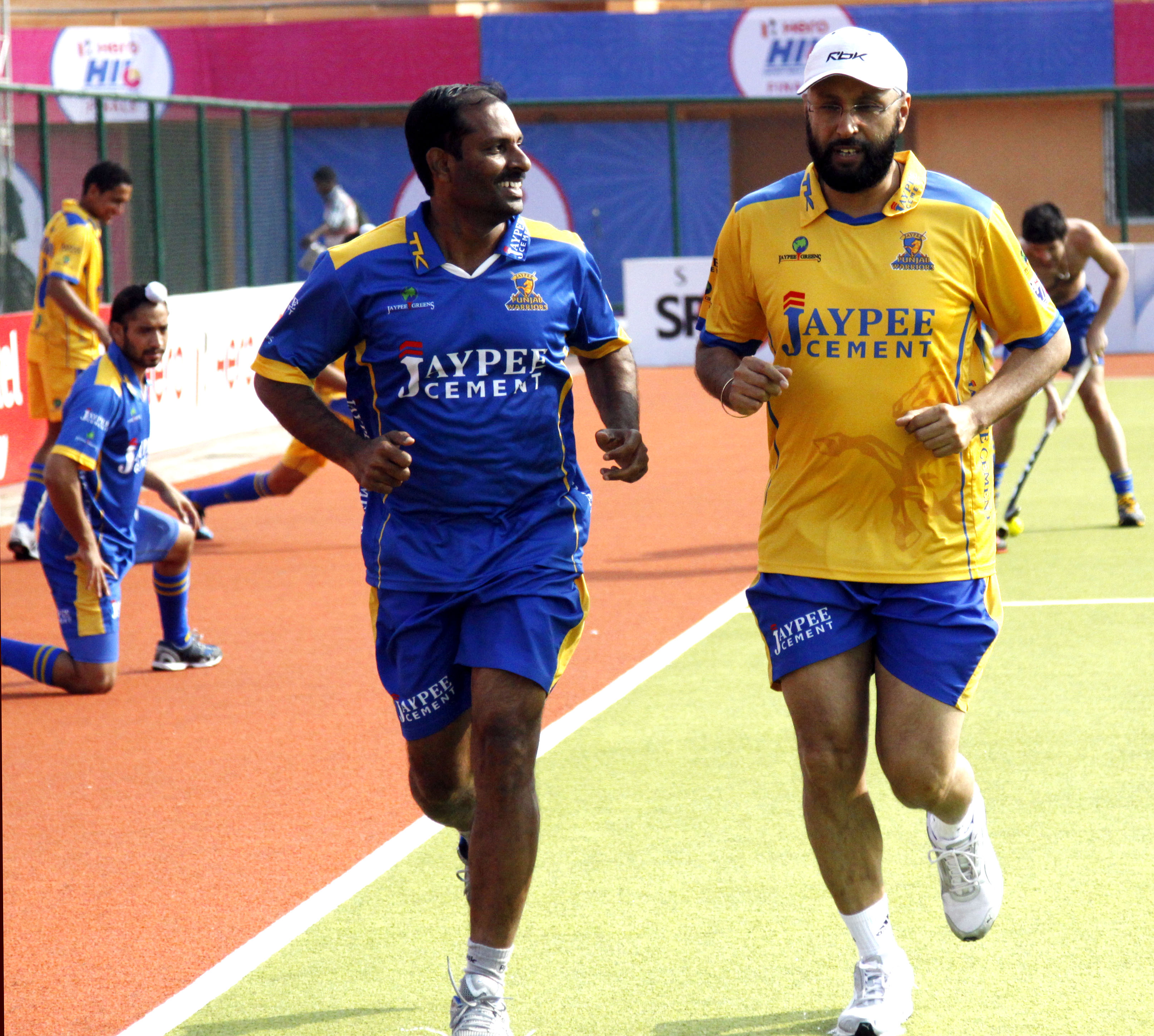
- Mohammed Riaz (left) and Jagbir Singh

Personal information
- Full name: Riaz Nabi Mohammed
- Nationality: Indian
- Born: May 5, 1972 (age 54) Madras, Tamil Nadu, India
Medal record
Men's Field hockey
Representing India
Asian Games
Gold medal – first place	1998 Bangkok	Team
Silver medal – second place	1994 Hiroshima	Team

Nabi Mohammed Riaz (born 5 May 1972) is a former captain of the Indian field hockey team. A two-time Olympian, he represented India at the 1996 Atlanta and 2000 Sydney Olympics. He was part of the Indian team that won the gold medal at the 1998 Asian Games in Bangkok and the silver medal at the 1994 Asian Games in Hiroshima. In recognition of his achievements, he was conferred the prestigious Arjuna Award in 1998. He has won the title for "Best Sportsmen of the year" from Tamil Nadu's chief minister in 1999. After retiring from international play, Riaz served as the coach of the Indian men’s hockey team at the 2012 London Olympics. He currently serves as the Chairman of the Selection Committee of the Tamil Nadu Hockey Association. His father was an international hockey umpire. His daughter, Shameena Riaz, is an emerging squash player, while his son is a budding footballer.
