= Muhammad Reazuddin Ahmad =

Muhammad Reazuddin Ahmad Saheb
- মোহাম্মদ রেয়াজুদ্দীন আহমদ
- Born: 1861; Kaunia, Barisal, Bengal Presidency
- Died: 1933 (aged 71–72); Bengal Presidency
- Education: Barisal Bengal School; Bajapti Circle School
- Occupations: Writer, journalist
- Era: British Raj

Muhammad Reazuddin Ahmad (1861–1933) was a Bengali Muslim writer, journalist, and thinker.

== Early life ==
Ahmad was born in 1861 in the village of Kaunia in Barisal District, Bengal Presidency, British Raj. His father died when he was eight. He was raised in the home of Muhammad Wajid, the father of Bengali politician A. K. Fazlul Huq. He received his education from Barisal Banga Vidyalay and Bajapti Circle School, studying the Arabic, Bengali, and Persian languages.

== Career ==
Ahmad started his career as a primary school teacher in Rupsa. He developed an interest in journalism after reading local newspapers like Bangabasi, Dhaka Prakash, Education Gazette, Hughli Dainik, and Sanjibani. He was the postmaster of Rupsa Post Office. He operated a stationery shop in Rupsa.

He moved to Kolkata in 1883 and joined the Mussalman. He worked as an editor in the Mussalman. He then joined Shrimanta Saodagar in Dhaka as an assistant editor. After some Muslims in Dhaka, Jessore, Khulna, and 24-Parganas converted into Hinduism and Christianity he started writing about Islam with Mearajuddin Ahmad, Reazuddin Ahmad Mashadi, and Sheikh Abdur Rahim to discourage further conversions. In 1888, they published Islamtattva, a book about Islam and its history. Along with Reazuddin Ahmad Mashadi and Shaikh Abdur Rahim, he was part of the 'Sudhakar group'. The group was closely connected to and named after Mihir-o-Sudhakar, a Muslim newspaper that strongly supported Muslim identity politics in Calcutta. The group wrote and published religious tracts in Bengali. He worked as the publisher of the Calcutta monthly Islam Pracharak. He edited the Nabajug, Rayatbandhu, and Soltan.

== Bibliography ==
He wrote a number of books about Islam and history.

- Bodhodaytattva (1879)
- Padyaprasun (1880)
- Tohfatul Moslemin (1885)
- Brhat Mohammadia Panjika (1895)
- Upadesh Ratnavali (1896)
- Jange Russ O Unan (1897)
- Greece-Turashko Yuddha, Volume 1 (1899)
- Bilati Mussalman (1900)
- Botale Ma Sureshvari (1900)
- Jobeda Khatuner Roznamcha (1907)
- Greece-Turashko Yuddha, Volume 2 (1908)
- Haq Nasihat (1927)
- Pak-Panjatan (1929)

== Death ==
Ahmad died in 1933.
