= Singapore Squash Rackets Association =

Sports organisation in Singapore

- Sport: Squash
- Abbreviation: SSRA
- Founded: 1970
- Affiliation: World Squash Federation
- Regional affiliation: Asian Squash Federation
- Location: Singapore
- President: Mr Thio Syn Wee
- Secretary: Raymond Tan

Official website
- www.sgsquash.com
- (Singapore)

Singapore Squash Rackets Association (SSRA) is the national governing body for squash in Singapore. The body was founded in 1970.
