= Islam Pracharak =

Islam Pracharak was a historic monthly Bengali magazine founded in the late 19th century.

== History ==
Islam Pracharak was founded in September 1891. The magazine was edited by Muhammad Reazuddin Ahmad. The magazine wanted to promote Islamic literature, culture, and history. It encouraged Bengali Muslims to stop religious superstitions. The magazine published translated passages from the Quran and other Islamic religious content. The magazine stopped publication in 1893 but restarted publication in 1899. The magazine was permanently closed in April 1900. The magazine supported the Ottoman Empire and wrote that the Russian Empire was encouraging Christians to rebel against the Ottoman Empire. The magazine was conservative and supported the Partition of Bengal.
