= Indian Squash Academy =

Squash training facility in Chennai, India

ICL-TNSRA Squash Academy
- Indian Squash Academy
- Former name: Indian Squash Academy
- Established: 1990
- Administrative staff: Cyrus Poncha
- Location: Nehru Park Sports Complex, Poonamallee High Road, Chennai, Tamil Nadu, India
- Website: ICL-TNSRA squash academy

Indian Squash Academy (also known as ICL-TNSRA Squash Academy) is a squash training facility established by the Squash Racquets Federation of India (SRFI) in Chennai, India. The India Cements was one of the sponsors it had initially sponsored the 1990 facility along with the Tamil Nadu Squash Racquets Association (TNSRA). It has trained several squash players such as Saurav Ghosal, Joshna Chinapa, Dipika Pallikal and Manish Chotrani.

== History ==
The academy was established as a joint venture between India Cements, SRFI, TNSRA and Sports Development Authority of Tamil Nadu in 2000. N. Ramachandran who was an industrialist and the president of TNSRA is said to be the one behind its creation. Initially, the facility had three courts from ASB Germany which was later accompanied by five additional ones.

The facility has hosted the 2007 Men's World Team Squash Championships. It has hosted the Asian Junior Squash Individual Championships on five occasions in 1997, 2001, 2005, 2009 and 2018.

== Facilities ==
The academy has eight squash courts in total. It consists of two complexes; one with 3 glass back rainbow courts and the other with 4 glass back rainbow courts that are convertible to 2 doubles courts. The ASB 4-sided glass court, enables television coverage from all angles, has a seating capacity of 500. All courts have been imported from ASB Germany. The overall seating capacity of the facility is 1,000. The academy also has a dormitory and cafeteria.

== Notable players ==
The academy has trained numerous players who have achieved in the international level.

- Saurav Ghosal
- Joshna Chinappa
- Gaurav Nandrajog
- Parthiban, Ramit Tandon
- Naresh Kumar
- W. Anwesha Reddy
- Cyril Kuhn
- Karan Malik
- Lakshmi Shruti Settipalli
- Harinder Pal Singh Sandhu
- Dipika Pallikal
- Parth Sharma
- Ravi Dixit

S.Maniam, a coach from Malaysia, who was the Consultant coach of Squash Rackets Association heads the training panel of the academy. Cyrus Poncha, India's National squash coach also coaches at the facility.
