= Squash Rackets Federation of India =

Indian governing body for squash

- Sport: Squash
- Abbreviation: SRFI
- Affiliation: World Squash Federation
- Regional affiliation: Asian Squash Federation
- Location: Chennai
- President: Anil Wadhwa
- Secretary: Cyrus Poncha

Official website
- www.indiasquash.com
- (India)

The Squash Rackets Federation of India a.k.a. SRFI is the Indian governing body for the game of squash. It conducts the National Squash Championship, promotes the game through the state squash bodies, provides training facilities, selects the squad, and chooses coaches for the national team.

Among the facilities created by the SRFI is the Indian Squash Academy. It hosted the 2007 World Team Championship.

== Background ==
Conflict between the SRFI and squash athletes came to a fore in 2005, when the government was conferring the Dronacharya Award on SRFI affiliated squash coach Cyrus Poncha. India's number one squash player Joshna Chinappa wrote a letter to the Ministry of Sports and Youth Affairs that she never trained under Poncha, and that he had misused her name to get the Dronacharya Award. The SRFI chairman Ramachandran then produced testimonials from Joshna where she acknowledges the support of SRFI and Poncha.

In 2008, the SRFI chose a woman's squad for the Asian Championships without Dipika Pallikal, who was then training in Egypt, after having recently won the U-17 British Junior Open. The federation cited irregularities in the paperwork in informing the group about her absence due to training, but it was felt that this might have been a rivalry with the Mittal Champions Trust which had been sponsoring her training abroad.

SRFI manages two squads that represent India in international squash: the India men's national squash team, the India women's national squash team.

== Activities ==
The various activities conducted by the SRFI during the year include:

- Coaching camps
- Tournaments (national and international)
- Daily training at the Indian Squash Academy
- Referee clinics
- Participates in international competitions
- Level 1, 2 & 3 coaching courses
- Development activities at tier 2 and 3 cities

== Rise of Indian squash ==
In December 2012, squash player Dipika Pallikal Karthik achieved a career-best rank of 10. She became the first female squash player to be conferred with the Arjuna Award, India's second highest sporting award, in the year 2012. Later in December 2013, Saurav Ghosal became the first Indian male squash player to reach the top 20 by achieving a career-best rank of 15. He was also awarded the Arjuna Award by the president of India in August 2007.

In December 2014, Dipika Pallikal and Joshna Chinappa defeated Jenny Duncalf and Laura Massaro to claim India's first-ever gold medal in squash at the Commonwealth Games. At the 2014 Asian Games, the Indian men's national team clinched gold; the women's earned their first silver. Saurav Ghosal and Dipika Pallikal, with a silver and bronze respectively in the individual events, signed off with their best medal haul in the Asian Games. The men's team, led by Saurav Ghosal, clinched the historic gold after edging out Malaysia in the individual finals. At the 2014 WSF World Junior Championship, Kush Kumar became the first male squash player from India to reach the semifinal. He made history by winning the first ever bronze medal for India at a World Junior Championship.

At 2015, Velavan Senthilkumar won a bronze medal in the boys singles event in squash at the 2015 Commonwealth Youth Games held in Samoa. Velavan Senthilkumar and Harshit Jawanda won silver in the mixed doubles competition.

In 2016, both the men's and women's national teams won gold at the 2016 South Asian Games in Guwahati. In the men's individual events, Saurav Ghosal and Harinder Pal Sandhu won bronze after losing to arch-rival Pakistan; in the women's event, top seed Joshna Chinappa won gold after defeating her Pakistani rival Sadia Gul.

In 2017, Indian doubles pair Joshna Chinappa and Dipika Pallikal won bronze after losing to English pair Jenny Duncalf and Alison Waters in the semifinals of the WSF World Doubles Squash Championship. In May 2017, Joshna Chinappa became the first Indian to clinch the Asian Squash title after beating compatriot Dipika Pallikal Karthik in the women's final. This tournament was held at Express Avenue shopping mall in an all-glass court set up inside.

During the 2018 Asian Games, Saurav Ghosal, Dipika Pallikal, and Joshna Chinappa won bronze in their respective singles events.

== Postings ==
In February 2015, the federation appointed Harish Prasad as the national development officer. Since his appointment, squash in India has seen steady risen as he has focussed on conducting events for players, coaches and referees. Harish has been instrumental in implementing various initiatives for the development of the game.

In June 2015, Debendranath Sarangi and K Rajendiran were elected unopposed as president and secretary-general respectively of the Squash Rackets Federation of India at its Extraordinary General Meeting.

In July 2016, Egyptian coach Ashraf el Karagui was appointed by the Sports Authority of India to serve Indian squash. Within a short span he has made significant difference to the junior and senior players. Currently India's top two players, Joshna Chinappa and Dipika Pallikal Karthik train with Ashraf and praise him for the changes he has brought to their game.

In February 2017, Debendranath Sarangi was elected as the vice-president of the Asia Squash Federation with a two-thirds majority at the 37th ASF Annual General Meeting. Sarangi is the second Indian to become the vice-president of the ASF.

In July 2017, SRFI President Debendranath Sarangi was elected as a member of the World Squash Federation's ethics committee.

== See also ==
- India men's national squash team
- India women's national squash team
