= Sheikh Abdur Rahim =

Bengali writer

- Born: 1859; 24 Parganas, Bengal Presidency, British India
- Died: 14 July 1931 (aged 71–72); 24 Parganas, Bengal Presidency, British India
- Relatives: Anisuzzaman (grandson)

Sheikh Abdur Rahim (1859 – 14 July 1931) was a Bengali writer and journalist.

== Early life ==
Sheikh Abdur Rahim was born into a Bengali Muslim family of Sheikhs in 1859 in Muhammadpur, Basirhat, 24-Parganas, in the then British India. His father was Munshi Sheikh Golam Yahia. His mother died at a young age, and he was subsequently raised by Radhamadhav Basu. Basu was the zamindar of Taki and a deputy magistrate. Rahim studied at a school in Taki and went to high school in Kolkata. He could not complete his education as a result of contracting smallpox.

== Career ==
Rahim was very aware of the Bengali Muslim community's wealth and history. He edited Sudhakar in 1889 and Islam Pracharak in 1891. He would also go on to work for Mihir, Mihir O Sudhakar, Moslem Bharat, Moslem Hitaisi Hafez, and Islam-Darshan. He was a member of the Bangiya Mussalman Sahitya Samiti, Calcutta Central Textbook Committee, Calcutta Mohammedan Union, and Bangiya Sahitya Parishad. He was an entrance examiner of Bengali language at the University of Calcutta.

=== Bibliography ===
- Hazrat Muhammader Jibon Chorito O Dharmaniti (1887)
- Islam Etibritto (1910)
- Islam Neeti-1 (1925)
- Islam Neeti-2 (1927)
- Quran O Hadither Upodeshaboli (1926)
- Namajtotto Ba Namaj Bishoyok Juktimala (1898)
- Hajjbidhi (1903)
- Rojatotto (1928)
- Khotba (1932)
- Islamer Totto

== Death ==
Rahim died on 14 July 1931 in his own village.
