= Sport in Pakistan =

Sport in Pakistan is a significant part of Pakistani culture. Cricket is the most popular sport in Pakistan. Football has also gained popularity in recent years, and is the second most popular sport in the country. Field hockey is the national sport, and was popular for several decades, with some of Pakistan's greatest sporting accomplishments having taken place in this sport, along with squash. Polo and traditional sports like kabaddi, Tent pegging and other well-known games are also played.

In cricket, the country has had an array of success over the years, and has the distinct achievement of having won each of the major ICC international cricket tournaments: ICC Cricket World Cup, ICC World Twenty20, and ICC Champions Trophy; as well as the ICC Test Championship. The Pakistan Super League ranks among the top T20 leagues globally.

Football in Pakistan is as old as the country itself. Shortly after the creation of Pakistan in 1947, the Pakistan Football Federation was created, and the nation's founder Muhammad Ali Jinnah became its first Patron-in-Chief. The highest football division in the country is the Pakistan Premier League. Pakistan is known as one of the best manufacturers of the official FIFA World Cup ball.

In field hockey, Pakistan is one of the most successful national teams with a record four Hockey World Cup wins, eight Asian Games gold medals, three gold medals at the Olympic Games, and the only Asian team to have won the prestigious Champions Trophy three times.

Pakistan's Jahangir Khan is widely regarded as the greatest squash player of all time, followed by his compatriot Jansher Khan. From 1981 to 1986, Jahangir was unbeaten and during that time won 555 consecutive matches – the longest winning streak by any athlete in top-level professional sport, as recorded by Guinness World Records.

In Northern Pakistan, the annual Shandur Polo Festival at Shandur Top is an international event attended by enthusiasts from all over the world. The Shandur polo ground at Shandur Pass is the world's highest, at approximately 3,734 metres (12,251 ft).

The Pakistan Olympic Association, established in 1948, and recognised in the same year by the International Olympic Committee, is the National Olympic Committee for Pakistan. It was the premier regulator of sports activities in Pakistan from 1948 until the establishment of Pakistan Sports Board. Established in 1962 as a corporate body, the Pakistan Sports Board is responsible for promoting and developing uniform standards of competition in sports across Pakistan, as well as regulating and controlling sports activities on a national level. It is supported by the Pakistan Sports Trust, which provides financial assistance to players and associations facing financial difficulties, enabling them to continue their participation in the Olympic Games, Asian Games, World Games, and Commonwealth Games.

== History ==
Muhammad Ali Jinnah, the founder of Pakistan, had a great love for the sport and fully realized the vital role it played in the development of nations and the inculcation of discipline among the masses. In a meeting with the Organizing Committee of the First Pakistan Olympic Games held at Karachi, Jinnah told the first President of the Pakistan Olympic Association, Ahmed E.H.:

Dedicate yourself to sports promotion, for when you and I are gone, leadership will go into the hands of Youth, and Youth is our wealth, a raw material, that must be hammered into shape, into burnished steel to strive and smite in defense – the defense of the integrity and solidarity of Pakistan – the defense of the ideology of Pakistan.

The first National Games were held at Polo Ground, Karachi from 23 to 25 April 1948. Sportsmen and officials from East Pakistan (now Bangladesh) and all the integrated Provincial units of West Pakistan took part in these games. The total number of athletes was 140. No competitors were, however, invited from any foreign country. Competitions were held in basketball, boxing, cycling, track and field, volleyball, weightlifting, and wrestling.

Pakistan's sporting prowess has declined sharply in recent years, while cricket remains widely popular, other sports have suffered due to neglect from both the government and sporting authorities. The corporatization of sports in Pakistan has led to a lack of investment in nurturing talented athletes and providing adequate facilities and training. Government patronage and funding for sports are at an all-time low, resulting in outdated equipment, obsolete training methods, and dilapidated sports infrastructure. The focus on cricket has overshadowed other sports, exacerbating the decline across various disciplines.

== Sports structure ==
Since independence, Pakistan's sports system has developed along multiple overlapping models rather than a single club-based pyramid. The most distinctive of these has been the departmental model, where state-owned enterprises, government ministries, and the armed forces employ athletes as staff and field teams in domestic competition. This approach, inherited from colonial-era works teams, became dominant from the 1960s to the 1990s across cricket, football, hockey, and athletics, providing stable employment for players through institutions such as Pakistan International Airlines, WAPDA, and the armed services.

Alongside departments, federations have periodically promoted regional and provincial teams, representing administrative units such as Punjab, Sindh or Karachi, particularly in the National Games and domestic cricket. Community clubs and academies have remained central at the grassroots, especially in football hotbeds such as Lyari in Karachi, but have historically lacked resources compared to departmental employers.

Since the 2010s, a fourth model has emerged with franchise-based leagues, most notably the Pakistan Super League in cricket or Super Kabaddi League, which operate on commercial contracts and media rights. The coexistence of departments, regions, clubs, and franchises has produced a hybrid and sometimes unstable sporting landscape, with policy shifts periodically reshaping the balance among these models.

== Hosting history ==
=== Global Level ===
Pakistan has hosted several major international sporting events across multiple disciplines. At the global level, it co-hosted the 1987 Cricket World Cup, 1996 Cricket World Cup and the 2025 Champions Trophy, and hosted the 1990 Hockey World Cup, finishing runners-up after losing 3–1 to the Netherlands in the final. Pakistan also hosted the 1984 Squash World Open and later editions in 1993 in Karachi and 1996 and 2003 in Lahore, as well as the 1993 and 2005 Men's World Team Squash Championships. The country also hosted multiple editions of the Hockey Champions Trophy in 1978, 1980, 1981, 1983, 1984, 1986, 1988, 1992, 1994, 1998, and 2004. National Hockey Stadium in Lahore is considered to be the largest international field hockey stadium in the world, and holds a capacity of 45,000 spectators. Pakistan hosted the circle style 2020 Kabaddi World Cup. Pakistan also hosted the 2025 Women's Cricket World Cup Qualifier. The FIH event returned to Pakistan for the first time in 24 years with the country set to host the 2026–27 Men's FIH Hockey Nations Cup in Lahore from 19 to 28 February.

=== Continental Level ===
At the continental level, Pakistan hosted the Men's Asian Individual Squash Championships in 1981, 1992, 2013, and 2021, and the Women's Asian Individual Squash Championships in 1992, 2013, and 2021. It has hosted the Asian Team Squash Championships on three occasions: in 1981, 1992, and 2026. The 1992 and 2026 editions included both men's and women's tournaments. Pakistan hosted the 2008 Asia Cup and co-hosted the 2023 Asia Cup in cricket, the 1982 Hockey Asia Cup, the 2012 and 2016 Asia Kabaddi Cup, the 1984 Asian Table Tennis Championships, and the 1981 and 1988 Asian Wrestling Championships. Pakistan has also hosted multiple editions of Asia Baseball Cup in 2006, 2010, 2012, 2013, 2015, 2017 and 2023. In 2026, Pakistan hosted 8th World Taekwondo President's Cup (Asian Region), with a record participation of 38 nations.

=== Regional Level ===
Pakistan has hosted several major regional and multi-sport events, including the South Asian Games in 1989 and 2004, and is scheduled to host the 2027 edition. It also hosted the 1993 SAARC Gold Cup and the 2005 SAFF Gold Cup. Jinnah Stadium in Islamabad has long served as the primary home ground of the Pakistan national football team and hosted the 2014 SAFF Women's Championship. Pakistan hosted the CAVA Men's Volleyball Nations League in 2022, 2024 and 2026. Pakistan has also hosted notable international qualifiers and championships, including the 2025 SAAF Cross Country Championships.

== Team sports ==
=== Cricket ===
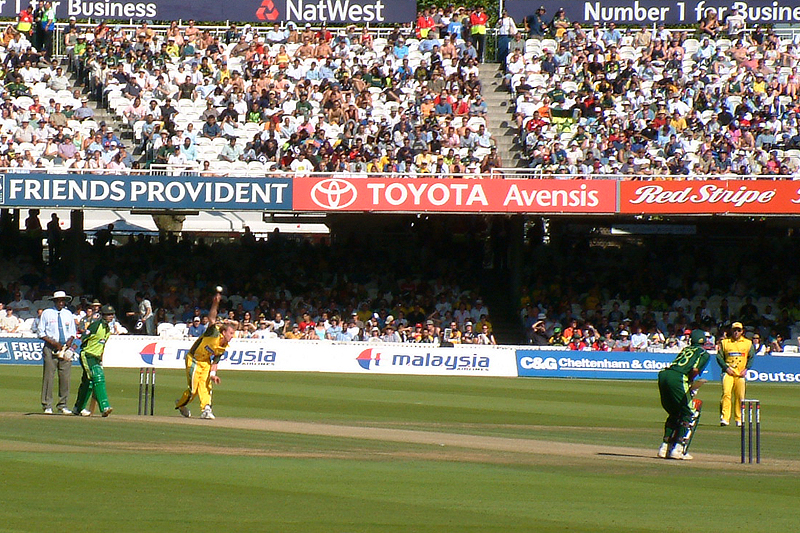
A cricket match between Pakistan and Australia at Lord's.

Cricket is the most popular sport in Pakistan. Pakistan has won international cricket events, which include the 1992 Cricket World Cup, the 2009 ICC World Twenty20 and the 2017 ICC Champions Trophy besides finishing as runner-up in the 1999 Cricket World Cup, 2007 ICC World Twenty20 and the 2022 T20 World Cup. Pakistan also won the ACC Asia Cup in 2000 and 2012 and all three versions of the Austral-Asia Cup.

Pakistan's cricket teams take part in domestic competitions such as the Quaid-e-Azam Trophy, the Patron's Trophy, ABN-AMRO Twenty-20 Cup, and the ABN-AMRO Champions Trophy. Pakistan Cricket Board also organize a franchise based T20 cricket league known as the Pakistan Super League.

Pakistan has also been a major host nation, co-hosting the 1987 and 1996 Cricket World Cups and the 2025 ICC Champions Trophy, while hosting the 2008 Asia Cup and co-hosting the 2023 Asia Cup. Pakistan won the 1998–99 Asian Test Championship, reached No. 1 in ICC Test rankings in 2016 under Misbah-ul-Haq, and holds a record six Hong Kong Sixes titles. The women's team won gold medals at the 2010 and 2014 Asian Games, underlining Pakistan's strength across formats. Pakistan also hosted the 2025 ICC Women's Cricket World Cup Qualifiers, further highlighting its growing role in international women's cricket.

On March 3, 2009, 12 militants with guns, grenades, and rocket launchers attacked a bus carrying the Sri Lanka national cricket team to a match at Lahore's Gaddafi Stadium in Pakistan. Six Pakistani policemen escorting the team and two civilians were killed while seven Sri Lankan players and an assistant coach were injured. Since the terrorist attacks, no foreign cricket teams toured Pakistan until 2015 when Zimbabwe toured for an away series. A month after the attack on the Sri Lankan team, the International Cricket Council relieved Pakistan of co-hosting duty for any 2011 Cricket World Cup games. Pakistan has tried to make the best of the situation by offering to host its "home" matches on neutral territory in the United Arab Emirates. However, due to a decrease in terrorism in Pakistan over the past few years, as well as an increase in security, many teams have toured Pakistan since 2015. These teams include Zimbabwe, Sri Lanka, West Indies, Bangladesh, South Africa, Australia, England and an ICC World XI team. In addition, the Pakistan Super League has seen games hosted in Pakistan.

International Test and one-day matches are played between the Pakistan national cricket team and foreign opponents regularly. Women's cricket is also very popular, with Kiran Baluch holding the current record for the highest score in a women's test match with her innings of 242. The Pakistan Cricket Board controls both the men's and women's games. The 2020 Pakistan Super League events was hosted entirely by Pakistan.

Notable cricketers from Pakistan include Aaqib Javed, Ramiz Raja, Babar Azam, Shoaib Akhtar, Younis Khan, Saqlain Mushtaq, Mushtaq Ahmed, Abdul Qadir, Wasim Akram, Zaheer Abbas, Javed Miandad, Saeed Anwar, Muhammad Yousaf, Inzamam-ul-Haq, Waqar Younis, Shahid Afridi, the Mohammad brothers (Hanif, Mushtaq, Sadiq and Wazir) and Imran Khan. Imran Khan has been named in the ICC Cricket Hall of Fame. Saeed Anwar's 194 runs against India remained the record for most runs by a batsman in an ODI for 11 years which was broken by Fakhar Zaman's 210 against Zimbabwe in 2018. Shoaib Akhtar holds the record of delivering the fastest delivery in the history of cricket. Shahid Afridi holds numerous records i.e. the 3rd fastest century in ODIs, and the highest number of sixes in international cricket. Wasim Akram at the time of his retirement had taken the most wickets in ODIs. Muhammad Yousuf has scored the most Test runs in a calendar year.

=== Field hockey ===
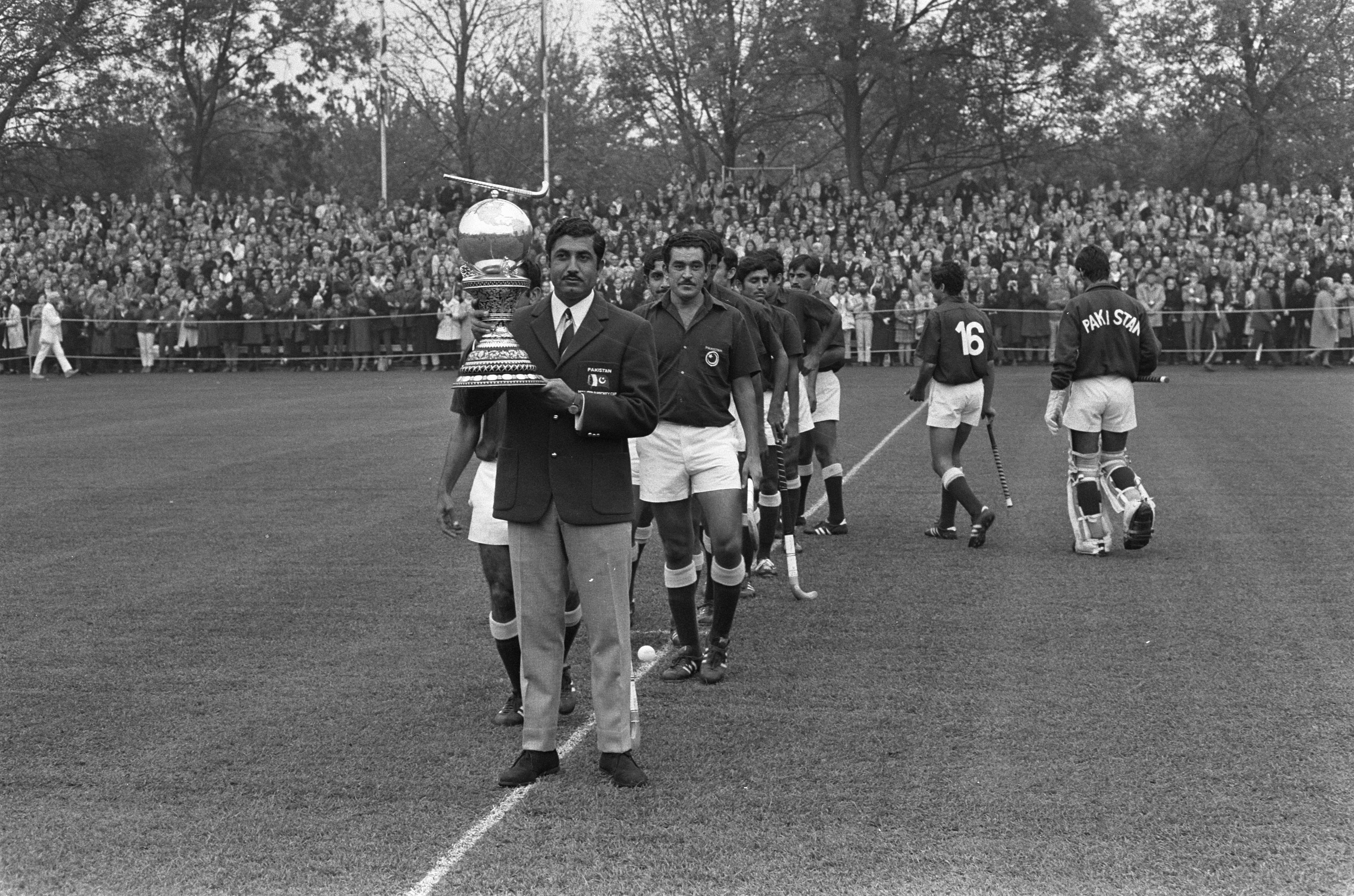
Pakistan with the 1971 Men's Hockey World Cup trophy

The Pakistan Hockey Federation (PHF) is the national governing body of field hockey in Pakistan. The Pakistan Hockey Federation Women Wing (PHFWW) is the official organization of women's field hockey in Pakistan.

The Pakistan national field hockey team has won 3 gold medals at the Olympic Games, and lifted the Hockey World Cup 4 times, being the country with most World Cups till the present. It has also won the most Asian gold medals and is the only Asian team to have won the prestigious Champions Trophy with 3 titles. It used to be consistently ranked among the top teams in the world. However, lately, there has been a decline in results, with the national team failing to qualify for both the 2016 and 2020 Olympics. The hockey team also failed to qualify for the 2023 World Cup. Also, because of the PHF's poor economy, there were two years without any international matches between 2019 and 2021. PHF secretary lamented over lack of funding could even ban Pakistan hockey team. As of December 2022 the team is ranked 16th in the world. Notable players include World-Record holder Waseem Ahmed, Mohammed Saqlain, and Sohail Abbas.

Beyond its Olympic, World Cup, Champions Trophy and Asian Games success, Pakistan has achieved notable titles including three Men's Hockey Asia Cup, multiple Sultan Azlan Shah Cup victories, and three Men's Asian Champions Trophy titles. The team has also won gold medals at the South Asian Games, earned podium finishes at the Commonwealth Games and Afro-Asian Games, and finished runners-up at the 2024–25 Men's FIH Hockey Nations Cup. Pakistan will make its debut in the 2025–26 Men's FIH Pro League, signaling a return to elite international competition. The National Hockey Championship is the main domestic field hockey competition of Pakistan since 1948.

=== Football ===
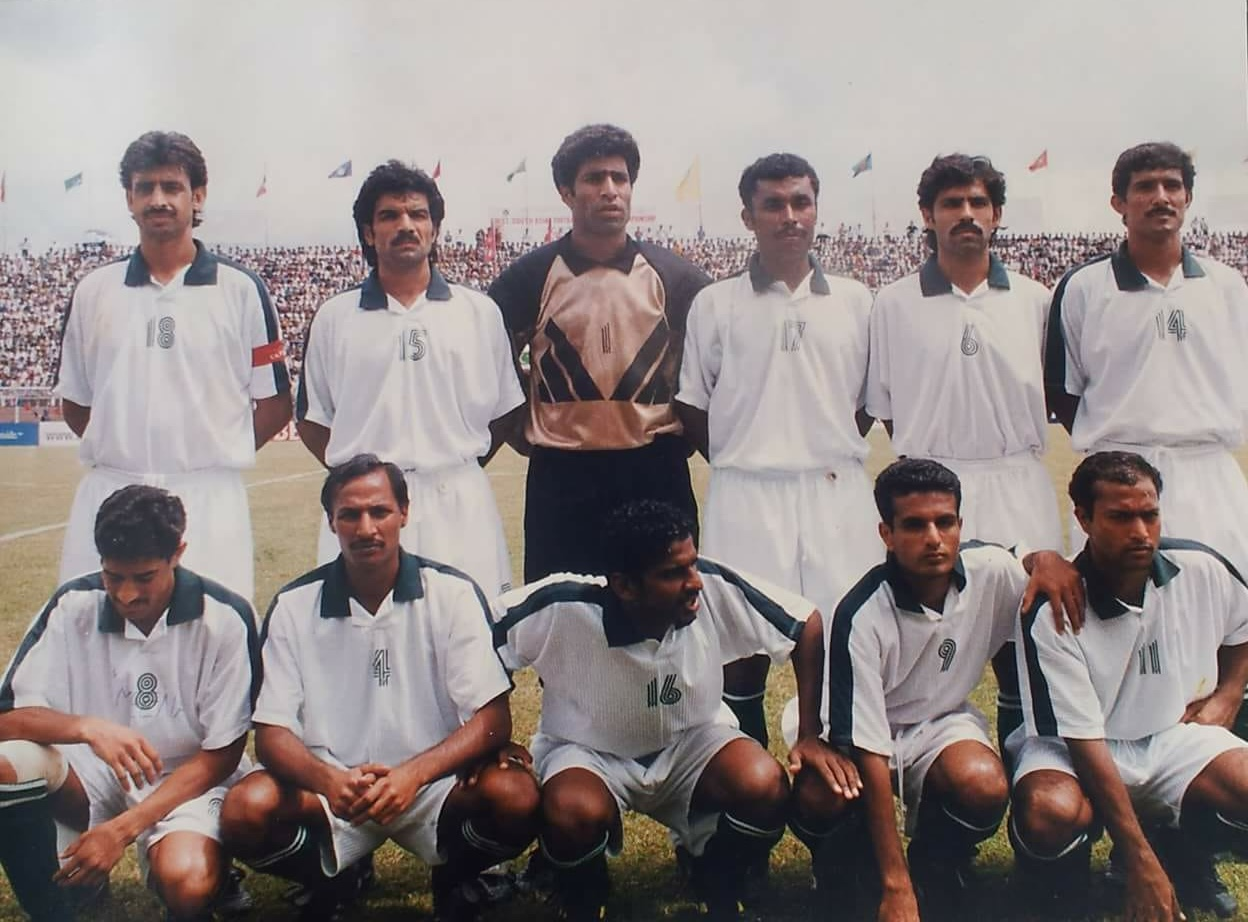
Pakistan national football team at the 1997 SAFF Gold Cup

Pakistan is known as the manufacturer of the official FIFA World Cup ball. The Pakistan Football Federation (PFF) is the governing body in Pakistan.

The origin of football in Pakistan can be traced back to the mid-nineteenth century when the game was introduced during the British Raj. Shortly after the creation of Pakistan in 1947, the Pakistan Football Federation was created, and Muhammad Ali Jinnah became its first Patron-in-Chief.

Pakistan's football team has won two gold medals at the South Asian Games, in 1989 and 1991, and secured a bronze medal in 1987. In regional competition, Pakistan achieved second place at the 2026 SAFF Championship and third place at the 1997 SAFF Championship (then known as the SAFF Gold Cup). Jinnah Stadium in Islamabad has long served as the primary home ground for the Pakistan national football team, and the country hosted the 2014 SAFF Women's Championship at the venue. Pakistan also hosted the 1993 SAARC Gold Cup and the 2005 SAFF Gold Cup.

From 1948 to 2003, the National Football Championship was held in Pakistan. After 2003, it was replaced by the Pakistan Premier League. However, due to the lack of professional football clubs, football was mainly held on amateur basis. As the global popularity of football surged, the sport's standing in Pakistan deteriorated. Some of the reasons for this decline was the administration's lack of attention to football and the departmental system running in Pakistan, which was abolished in other countries after the 1960s. However Lahore based Wohaib FC emerged as a leading club of the country in the early 1990s and became the first Pakistani club to pass the qualifying round of the Asian Club Championship, doing so in the 1992–93 edition. The Pakistan Football Federation also faced several bans by FIFA during the years. Nonetheless, the sport gained popularity in the 21st century. The Pakistan National Football Challenge Cup is the national "knockout" cup competition in Pakistani football, run by the Pakistan Football Federation. The Pakistan National Women's Football Championship is the annual women's championship.

2026 proved to be a landmark year for Pakistan football, as the men's national team won the 2026 Diamond Jubilee International Football Tournament in Maldives, their first triumph in a senior men's international final since 1991 South Asian Games gold and first standalone international title since 1952 Asian Quadrangular Football Tournament and reached the SAFF Championship final for the first time, ultimately losing 2-1 to India. The team also made its historic debut in a FIFA sanctioned event by participating in the inaugural 2026 FIFA ASEAN Cup on invitation, while the women's team appeared in the inaugural 2026 FIFA Series, securing a record 8-0 victory over Turks and Caicos.

=== Futsal ===
Futsal is a growing sport in Pakistan. In 2023, the Pakistan Football Federation launched the National Futsal Cup, the first nationwide futsal competition organised under its authority. The event was structured as a five-phase regional circuit, with separate tournaments for men and women held in Lahore, Quetta, Islamabad, Peshawar, and Karachi. The Pakistan national futsal team was formed in 2025 when Pakistan participated in the 2026 AFC Futsal Asian Cup qualifiers for the first time.

=== Ball hockey ===
The Pakistan national ball hockey team is primarily composed of Canadian Pakistanis, born in Canada or with links to that nation. The sport is growing in the South Asian community there. Pakistan competed for the first time at the World Championships in 2009. They finished 3rd out of 4 in Group B behind only Bermuda and ice hockey giants Finland, and ahead of Cayman Islands. In the next world championships, they also participated and were champions of their group after defeating France in extra time. The Pakistan national ball hockey team is developing and improving, and in 2013 were awarded Pool A status, competing for gold in St. John's, Newfoundland.

=== Baseball ===
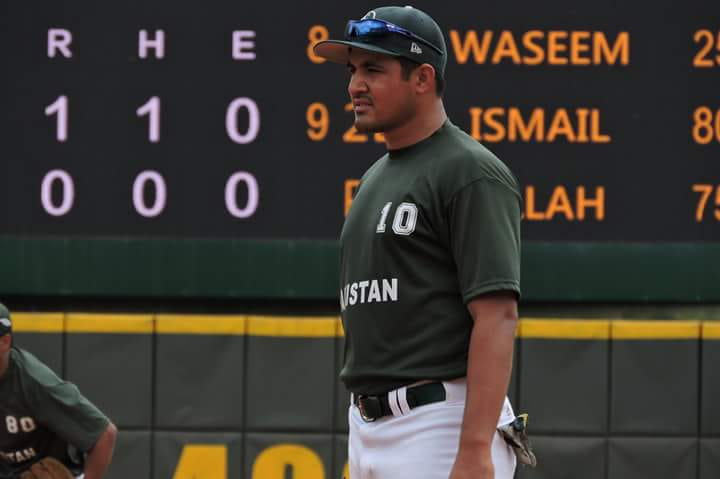
Jawad Khan with the Pakistan national baseball team

Pakistan Federation Baseball has hosted the Asian Baseball Cup several times, with the national team also winning the tournament in several editions. The team won the first SAARC Baseball Championship in 2011. The team qualified for the World Baseball Classic qualifier round for the first time where they lost 0–10 against Brazil and 0–14 while competing against Great Britain in 2016.

=== Basketball ===
Basketball was introduced to Pakistan around 1900 and is especially popular in Lahore and Karachi. The Pakistan Basketball Federation has been part of FIBA since 1958. Six teams play in the Pakistan first division. The National Women's Basketball Championship is the Women's Basketball tournament.

=== Handball ===
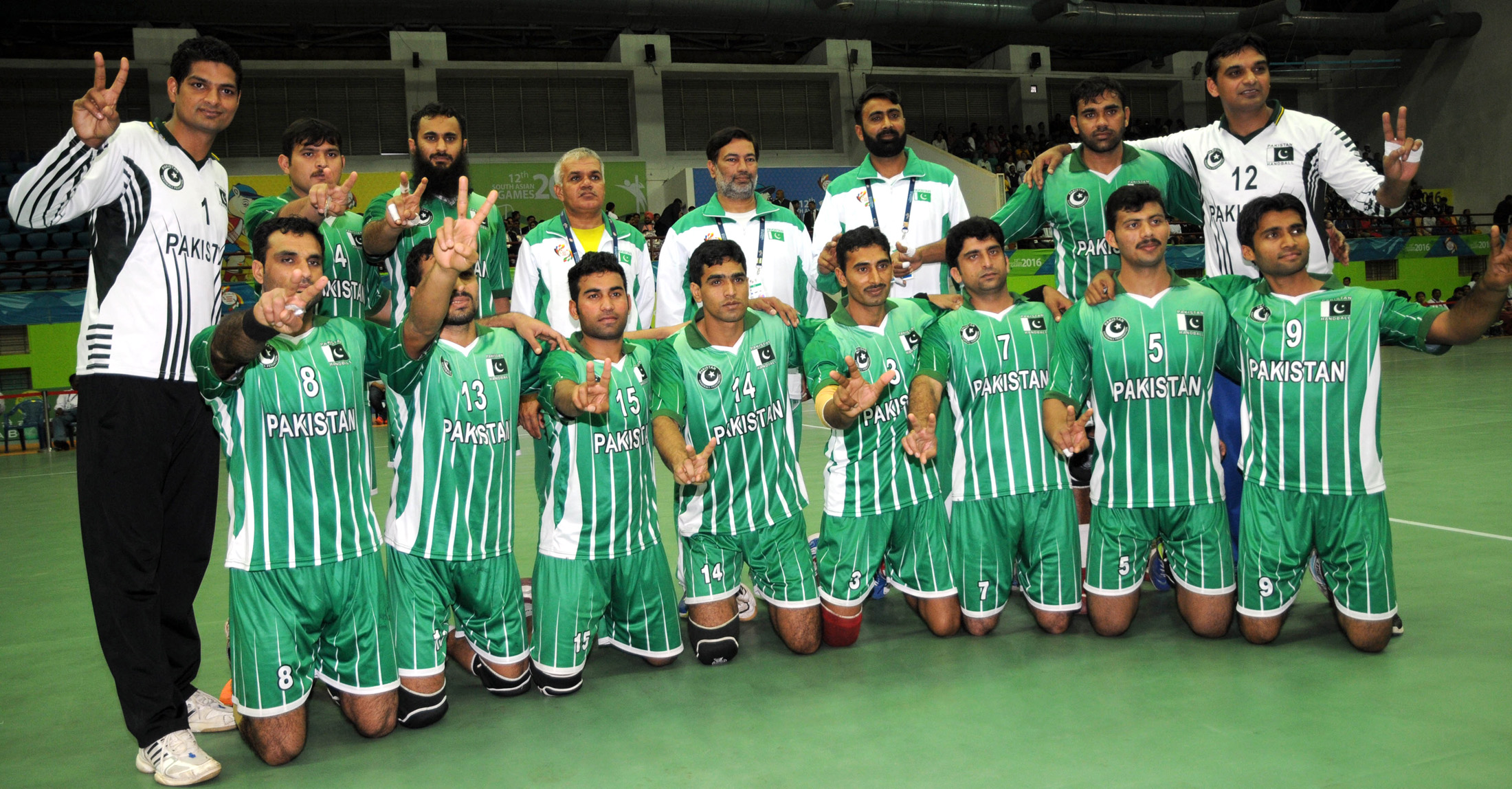
The Silver Medal winning Pakistan men handball team at the 2016 South Asian Games

Handball was first played in 1984 in an exhibition event, and was taken up by the Pakistan Olympic Association. The Pakistan Handball Federation is a member of the Asia Handball Federation.

The Pakistan men's national handball team is one of the most successful handball team of South Asia, winning 2 gold and 1 silver medal at the South Asian Games. Pakistan won gold in the 2010 and 2019 edition of the South Asian Games beating India by 37–31 and 30–29 respectively. In the 2016 edition, Pakistan were beaten 32–31 by the hosts India.

=== Beach Handball ===
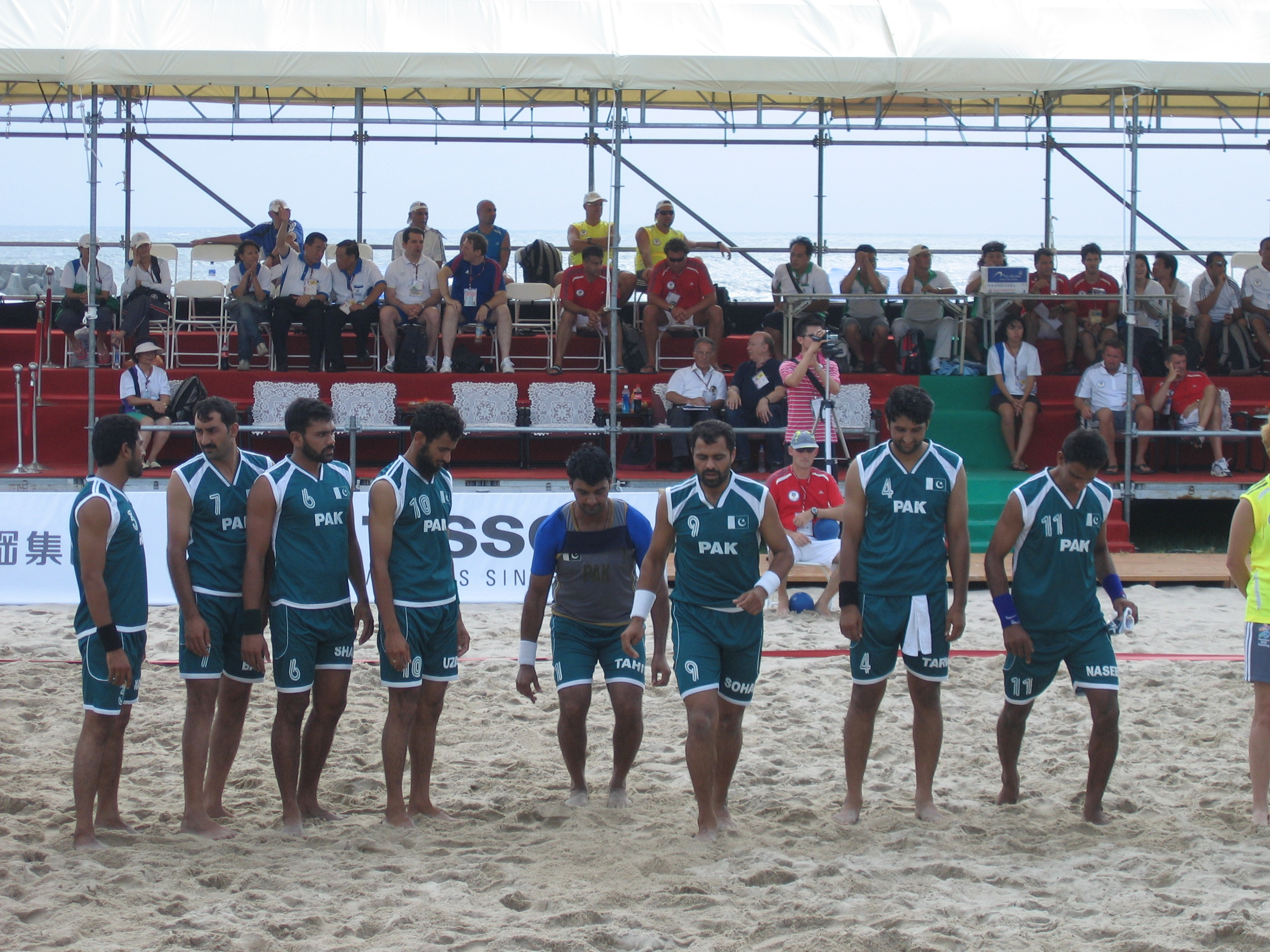
Pakistan Beach Handball team at the 2009 World Games in Taiwan

In beach handball, Pakistan has won the Asian Championship in 2007 and Asian Beach Games in 2008. Pakistan national beach handball team made their debut in IHF World Championship at the 2008 edition, finishing at 10th position. Pakistan have won a total of 8 official international medals to professional and grassroots level selections, with one gold and silver medal along with three bronze medals in the Asian Beach Games beach handball tournaments held in Bali 2008, Muscat 2010, Haiyang 2012, Phuket 2014 and Danang 2016, respectively.

=== Rugby union ===
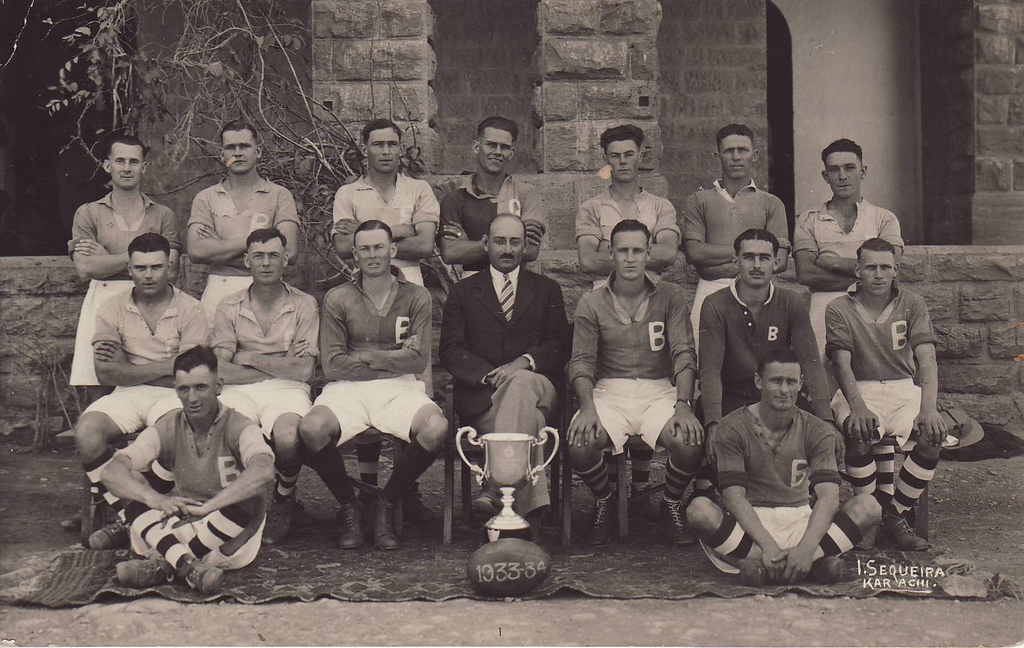
Rugby team of Karachi, c. 1934

The Pakistan Rugby Union was formally established in 2000 and gained memberships with the Asian Rugby Football Union in 2000. In 2003, Pakistan fielded a national team for the first time, participating in the Provincial Tournament in Sri Lanka. In November 2004, it participated in the 19th Asian Championship in Hong Kong. The Pakistan Rugby Union then became an associate member of the International Rugby Board (IRB).

There are three major clubs in Pakistan, which include Islamabad Rugby Football Club (IRFC) also known as the "JINNS", Lahore Rugby Football Club (LRFC), and Karachi Rugby Football Club (KRFC).

The latest landmark for Pakistan rugby is that universities like Lahore University of Management and Sciences (LUMS) and Bahria University Islamabad have formed teams as well.

=== Volleyball ===
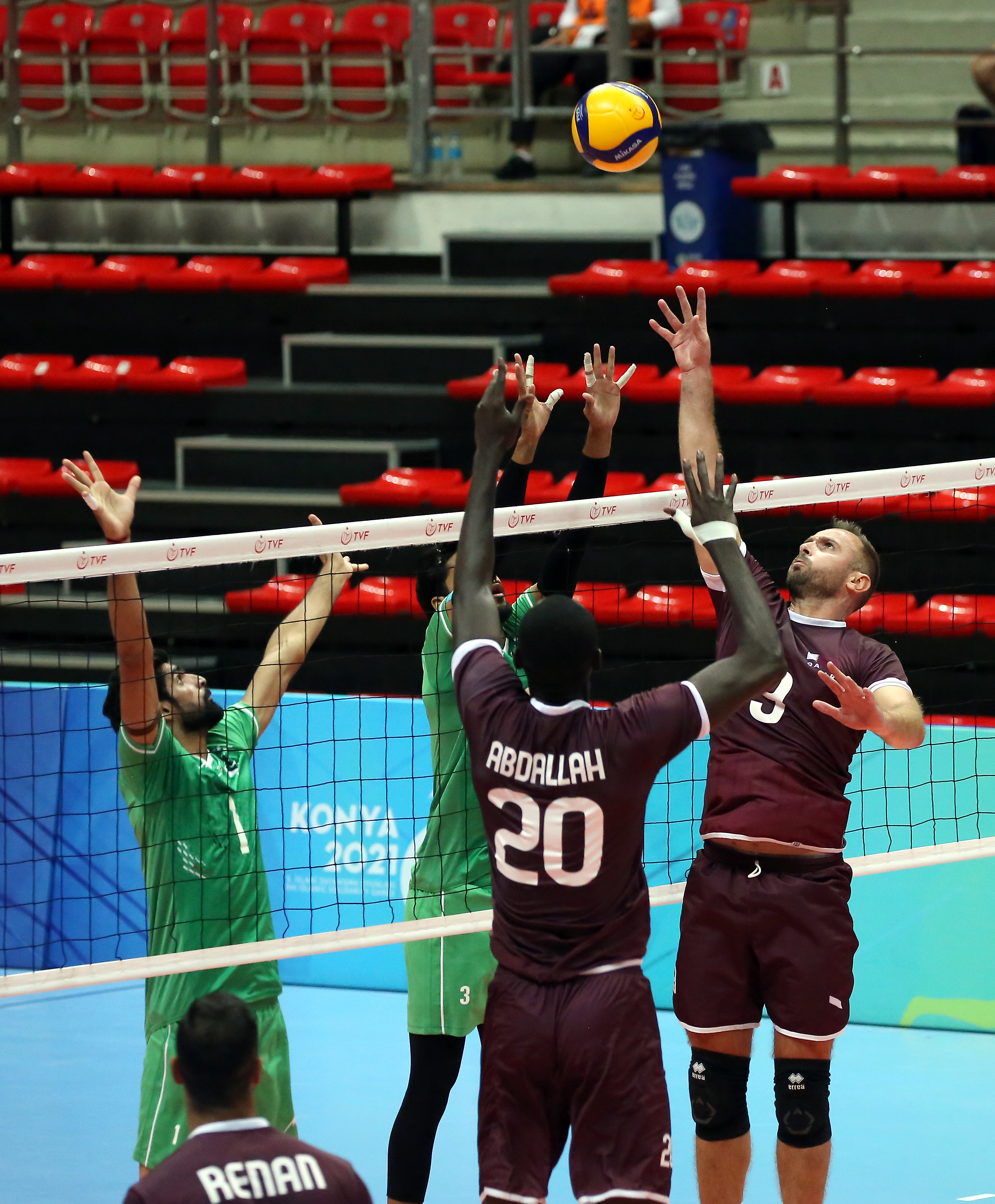
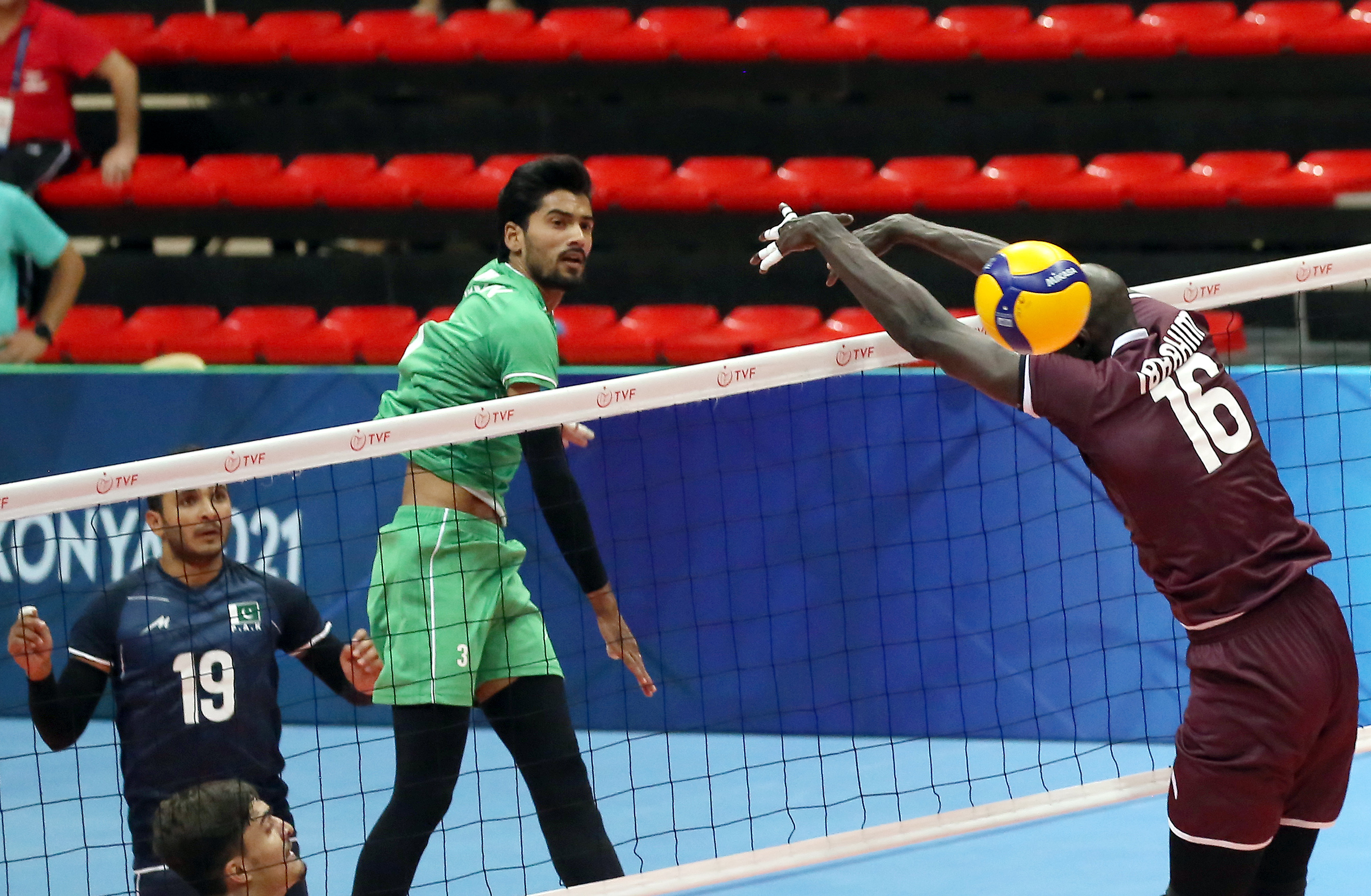
Pakistan at the 2021 Islamic Solidarity Games against Qatar

Volleyball enjoys huge popularity in small towns and villages across Pakistan, particularly in the northern province of Khyber Pakhtunkhwa. Most players of the Pakistani volleyball team hail from this region.

Pakistan's men's volleyball team has a strong record in regional competitions, winning bronze at the 1962 Asian Games in Jakarta and achieving multiple medals in the South Asian Games including gold in 1989 in Islamabad and 1993 in Dhaka, silver in 1987 in Calcutta, 1991 in Colombo, 1995 in Madras, 1999 in Kathmandu, 2004 in Islamabad, 2010 in Dhaka and 2019 in Kathmandu, and bronze in 2006 in Colombo and 2016 in Guwahati. Pakistan also won silver medals at the AVC Men's Volleyball Cup in Isa Town in 2024 and in Manama in 2025. In the Central Asian Volleyball Association competitions, Pakistan secured gold at the 2022 Championship in Lahore, 2024 and 2026 in Islamabad, and won bronze at the 2025 tournament in Fergana.

The team secured its first Asian Games medal in 64 years, a bronze at the 2026 Nagoya Games, having last won bronze at the 1962 Jakarta Games. The team is ranked within the top 50 volleyball nations by FIVB and has won three Central Asian titles. Pakistan Volleyball Federation is the governing body of Volleyball in Pakistan.

== Equestrian sports ==
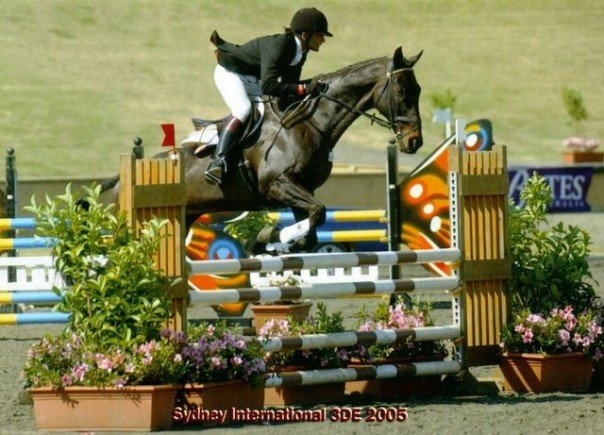
Usman Khan during the Show Jumping Phase at Asia Pacific Championship in Sydney.

Equestrianism had traditionally been limited to the upper-echelon of Pakistani society up until the end of the 20th century. The Equestrian Federation of Pakistan (EFP) is the national governing body to promote and develop equestrian sports in Pakistan.

Usman Khan is recognized as the first Pakistani equestrian to reach the Minimum Eligibility Requirements for the Olympic Games. His international record includes two gold medals, four silver medals and one bronze at the FEI events, making him one of Pakistan’s most accomplished riders in an Olympic equestrian discipline. In the 2004 Athens Olympics, a US-based Pakistani Rider Nadeem Noon won a place as a wild card entry but he missed out after his horse got injured. Usman topped the FEI Middle East & Africa Eventing Rankings, taking Pakistan to No. 1 in the region in the 2025 World Rankings and securing qualification for the 2026 Asian Games. He made history as Pakistan's first rider to qualify for the 2020 Tokyo Olympics in eventing with his horse Azad Kashmir. His Olympic qualification was later affected when Azad Kashmir died in 2020, as qualification is earned by a rider and horse together. In 2021, a second horse, Kasheer, died following a tragic, fatal fall at an Olympic qualifier, where Usman was also injured. Usman previously qualified for the 2014, 2018 and the 2022 Asian Games but on all occasions, he couldn't get the funding required to fly his horse to those events. Despite these setbacks, Khan continues to compete internationally.

Sardar Fateh Khan made history by winning Pakistan's only equestrian medal at the Asian Games, a silver in tent pegging at the 1982 Asian Games. In January 1984, Pakistan fielded a team of Sardar Fateh Khan, Al Mustafa Imam, Malik Asif Yar Tiwana, Amer Munawar, and Mian Asad Hayat to win the Nehru Cup in Calcutta. In 2003–2004, Pakistani riders achieved notable success at the Grand World Championship and World Championship, with Al Mustafa Imam winning gold and Amir Munawar taking silver.

=== Polo ===
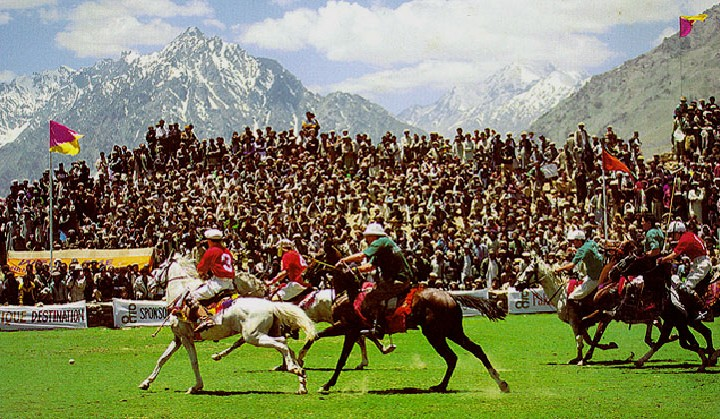
A polo match at Shandur

Polo is believed to have originated in Persia, and continues to be an important sport within the country with several large annual competitions.

The annual Shandur Polo Festival is an international event attended by enthusiasts from all over the world. The Shandur Polo Ground besides Shandur Pass is the world's highest, at approximately 3,734 metres (12,251 ft). The governing body of polo in Pakistan is the Pakistan Polo Association. There are more than twenty-one polo clubs in Pakistan and over forty polo championships held all over the country every year. Pakistan has qualified for the preliminary rounds of the World Polo Championship four times in 2004, 2011, 2015 and 2022. Pakistan's Hissam Ali Haider is the highest cap played in the Asian circuit. He has played for Cartier in the St. Moritz Snow Polo World Cup and the Commonwealth team in the Royal Salute Coronation Cup, both of which were won by his team.

=== Tent pegging ===
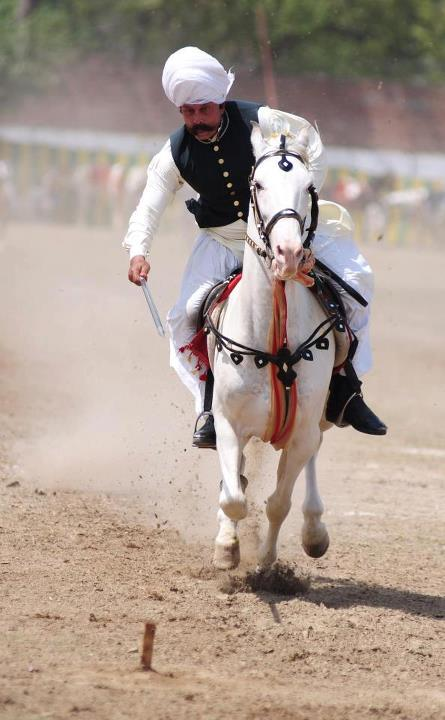
One of the founders of the International Tent Pegging Federation, Malik Ata Muhammad Khan, with his Lance at the Ranger Ground Lahore, 2012

Tent pegging is a popular sport in Pakistan. It is also locally named neza bazi. The Equestrian & Tent Pegging Federation of Pakistan, formed in 2014, is the highest governing body who organizes the sport in Pakistan. Various clubs across the country also organize an event as well. The sport is the major event of the National Horse & Cattle Show held at Fortress Stadium Lahore. Pakistanis compete in various international events notably the World Cup which commenced in 2014.

Malik Ata Muhammad Khan is one of the founders of International Tent Pegging Federation to address the Fédération Equestre Internationale (FEI), where he also served as Vice President.

== Racquet sports ==
=== Badminton ===
The Pakistan national badminton team represents Pakistan in international badminton team competitions. It is controlled by the Pakistan Badminton Federation, the governing body for badminton in Pakistan. The national team was established in 1953.

Pakistan has a notable early history in Asian badminton, having won bronze medals in the 1962 Asian Championships and the 1978 Asian Games, marking some of the country's most significant team achievements on the continental stage.

In 1979, Pakistan competed in the World Championships organized by the World Badminton Federation (WBF), a rival organization to the International Badminton Federation (now the Badminton World Federation, BWF). At this event, Pakistan secured a silver medal in men's singles and a bronze medal in the men's team competition. The WBF later ceased operations in 1981 and merged with the IBF. Pakistan made limited appearances in major mixed-team global competitions, participating in the Sudirman Cup in 1993, 1995, and 1997, though the team was eliminated at the group stage in all three editions. After a long absence from the international spotlight, Pakistan returned to elite competition by participating in the 2018 and the 2022 Commonwealth Games event through a bipartite invitation.

Pakistan made its Olympic badminton debut at the 2020 Tokyo Summer Olympics, when Mahoor Shahzad represented the nation in the women's singles discipline after receiving a Tripartite Commission invitation. This marked Pakistan's first-ever Olympic qualification in badminton, with Mahoor Shahzad becoming the first Pakistani badminton player to compete at the Olympic Games.

=== Squash ===
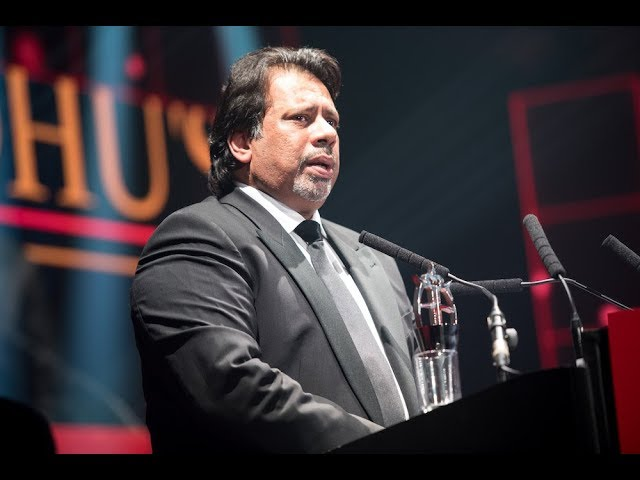
Jahangir Khan, widely regarded as the greatest squash player of all time.

Squash is a popular sport that has a large following in Pakistan, with Pakistan dominating the sport for some time. The World Open professional championship was inaugurated in 1976 and serves as the main competition today.

Jansher Khan won the World Open eight times, and the British Open six times. From 1990 until 1996, he remained unbeaten in 81 matches for consecutive six years. This longest-winning matches streak in Squash history was recorded by Guinness World Records. Jahangir Khan won the World Open title six times, and the British Open title ten times (1982–1991), and is widely regarded as the greatest squash player of all time, and one of the greatest sportsmen in Pakistan history. From 1981 to 1986, Khan was unbeaten and during that time he won 555 consecutive matches – the longest winning streak by any athlete in top-level professional sport as recorded by Guinness World Records.

Combined they have won 14 world opens, making Pakistan the most decorated Squash nation in the world. Pakistani players have won the Squash World Open 17 times, and British Open 12 times, the highest by any nation.

Zarak Jahan Khan won gold in men's singles at the 1998 Asian Games, while Amjad Khan took silver in the same event. At the 2002 Busan Asian Games, Mansoor Zaman won silver and Shahid Zaman earned bronze in men's singles. Mansoor Zaman added another bronze at the 2006 Doha Games, and Aamir Atlas Khan won silver in 2010. Noor Zaman and Muhammad Ashab Irfan won bronze medals in men's singles at the 2026 Asian Games. In the men's team event, Pakistan won gold in 2010, bronze in 2018, and silver in 2022 and 2026.

Maria Toorpakai Wazir, Madina Zafar, Amna Fayyaz, Faiza Zafar, Carla Khan, Noorena Shams, Sadia Gul, Riffat Khan, Sana Bahadar, Sehrish Ali, Mehwish Ali, Noor Ul Ain Ijaz, Noor Ul Huda Sadiq and Mahnoor Ali are Pakistan's most successful sportswomen, who represented Pakistan in international squash events. The Pakistan Squash Federation is the governing body for squash in the country. The Pakistan Open tournament is one of the premier events of the sport in the country. Recently, Pakistan has been making concerted efforts to revive the sport and regain its international standing. The hosting of the Karachi Open in January 2026, a PSA World Tour Gold event with a prize purse of $243,000, is a pivotal step. It was the country's biggest squash tournament in over two decades, attracting top international players. Every province of the country holds its own men's and women's championships. Some other notable players from Pakistan include Hashim Khan, Torsam Khan, Mohibullah Khan, Roshan Khan, Azam Khan, Qamar Zaman, Farhan Zaman, Asim Khan, Nasir Iqbal, Danish Atlas Khan, Farhan Mehboob, Yasir Butt, Israr Ahmed, Tayyab Aslam and Amaad Fareed.

=== Table tennis ===
The Pakistan Table Tennis Federation runs the sport in the country. Farjad Saif became the first Pakistani table tennis player to compete at the Olympics, representing Pakistan at the 1988 Seoul Olympics. He performed strongly and finished the tournament ranked 25th in the world. Saif also holds a record 13 national titles and is the only player to win the national championship seven times in a row.

Arif Khan is widely regarded as Pakistan's greatest table tennis player. He represented the country from 1974 to 1998, competing in four Asian Games, eight World Championships, and eight Asian Championships. He achieved Pakistan's highest-ever world ranking of 67th in 1984–85 and remains the only Pakistani to reach the Asian Championships quarter-finals. He won back-to-back men's singles gold medals at the 1987 (Kolkata) and 1989 (Islamabad) SAF Games, and a mixed doubles gold with Nazo Shakoor at the 1989 Islamabad Games making him the only Pakistani to win an individual table tennis gold at the SAF Games. He was a three-time national singles champion (1983, 1987, 1993) and received the Pride of Performance award from the Government of Pakistan in 1990. He later served as ITTF course conductor and national team coach across multiple countries.

The Pakistan women's national table tennis team in 1972, competed in the inaugural ATTU Asian Table Tennis Championships held in Beijing, China.

=== Tennis ===
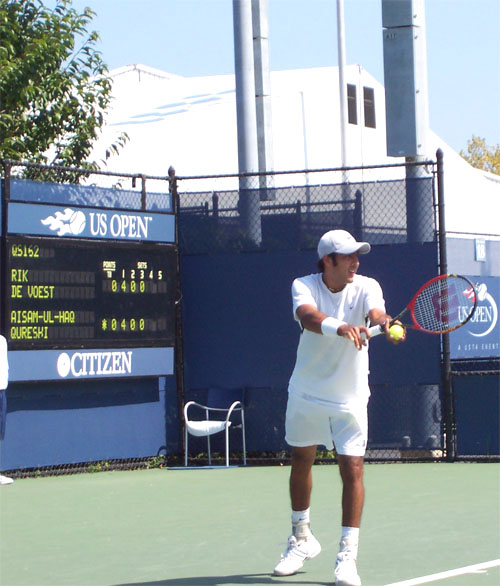
Aisam-ul-Haq Qureshi at the US Open.

Tennis is a very popular sport and Pakistanis compete in various international events. The Pakistan Tennis Federation (PTF) organizes the game in the country. Khwaja Saeed Hai was the first Pakistani to reach a Grand Slam tournament, playing at Wimbledon, the US Open, and the French Open where he made it to the third round. Haroon Rahim was a very successful player, he was the winner of several ATP Singles and Doubles titles. Lately, Aisam-ul-Haq Qureshi created history in Pakistani tennis, as he reached the finals of 2010 US Open – Men's doubles and 2010 US Open – Mixed doubles.

The Pakistan Davis Cup team have previously reached the world group play-offs, with the help of Aisam-ul-Haq Qureshi, currently Pakistan's number one, and Aqeel Khan, the number two. Tennis events are very rare in Pakistan and there is hardly an international tennis event, apart from ATP tournaments.

In 2026, Pakistan experienced a significant resurgence in tennis, marked by historic milestones on both the international and home fronts. In October, the country hosted the 2026 Billie Jean King Cup Asia/Oceania Zone Group III (B) for the first time ever, where the national women's team made a sensational home debut by sweeping Bahrain 3-0 at the PTF Tennis Complex. Pakistan finished as runners-up after defeating Bhutan 3-0, then top seeds Maldives 2-1 before falling 2-0 to Iran in the final. This was complemented by the successful revival of international women's circuits in Islamabad, notably hosting the W15 Islamabad World Tennis Women's Championships, which attracted 31 players from over 17 countries competing for WTA ranking points. During this period, Ushna Suhail and Mahin Aftab also made history by securing Pakistan's first-ever World Tennis Futures doubles title. On the men's side, the national team demonstrated continued competitiveness by securing a dominant 5-0 sweep against Senegal in their Davis Cup tie earlier in February 2026. Mikaeel Ali Baig achieved a historic No. 1 doubles ranking in USTA Florida U16, captured 16 ITF junior titles including a J100 singles championship and a historic J200 doubles title in Japan and was selected for Pakistan's Men's Davis Cup team at just 15 years old after leading the U16 squad to a Junior Davis Cup gold medal.

Parveen Ahmed was the first Pakistani woman to compete at a Grand Slam tennis tournament.

== Individual sports ==
=== Archery ===
The Pakistan Archery Federation is the governing body to develop and promote the game of archery in Pakistan. It is based in Lahore, and was founded in 1996. It was admitted into the World Archery Federation in 2005. Pakistan Archery Federation organizes National Archery Championship annually. Archery competitions are also a regular part of the National Games.

==== Mounted archery ====
Mohammad Omer Saleem, a graduate of LUMS, has become Pakistan's first-ever horseback archer. He is also the official representative of the World Horseback Archery Federation (WHAF) in Pakistan. Saleem represented Pakistan in the 16th World Horseback Archery Championship 2021 held in Tehran, Iran. He was placed at 18th in the Qabaq Track, 19th in the Kassai Track and 20th in the Korean Serial Track out of 45, including qualifiers. He broke the record for the highest score of any first-time participating country.

=== Athletics ===
The Athletics Federation of Pakistan (AFP) organises athletic tournaments in Pakistan. Pakistani athletes compete in various athletic events. Many Pakistani athletes have excelled in various events including the Olympic Games, the Asian Games, the World Athletics Championships and the Commonwealth Games among others.

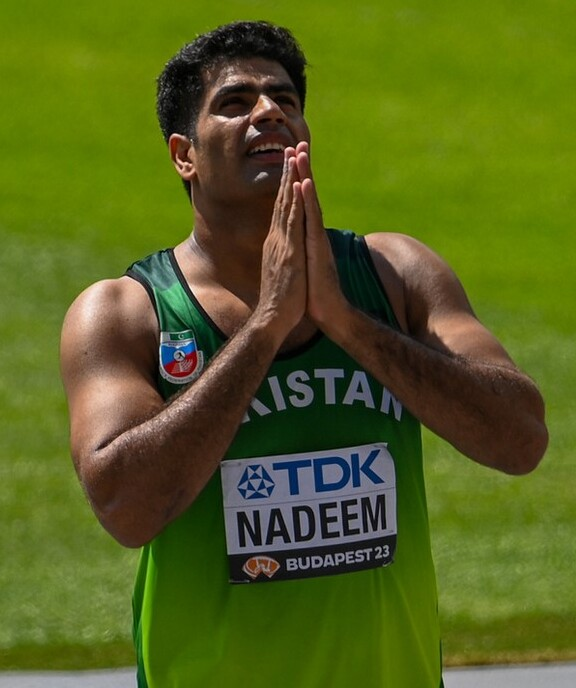
Arshad Nadeem, javelin thrower and Pakistan's first Olympic Gold medallist in athletics.

The 1950s and 1960s are often regarded as the Golden Age of Pakistani athletics, with Abdul Khaliq, Ghulam Raziq, Mubarak Shah, Muhammad Iqbal, Muhammad Nawaz, Jalal Khan, Allah Ditta and Muhammad Ramzan Ali achieving various milestones. In the early decades, Pakistanis held many Asian records including the Asian 100 m and 200 m record held by Abdul Khaliq. Other notable athletes include Muhammad Youssef, Muhammad Ayub, Muhammad Younis, Mirza Khan, Ghulam Abbas, Nadir Khan, Aqarab Abbas, Muhammad Sharif Butt, Khwaja Muhammad Aslam, Muhammad Sadaqat, Muhammad Fayyaz, Nusrat Iqbal Sahi, Norman Brinkworth, Abdul Rashid, Muhammad Siddique, Muhammad Yasir and Liaquat Ali among others, who got prominence at either Asian or International levels, winning gold medals for Pakistan. Pakistani female athletes have also represented Pakistan at the international level, such as Shabana Akhtar, who was the first Pakistani female athlete to participate at the Olympics. International events such as the Lahore Marathon take place in the country.

In recent times, Arshad Nadeem is the reigning Olympic champion in Men's javelin throw with an Olympic record throw of 92.97 metres (305.0 ft) at the 2024 Summer Olympics. He is the first Pakistani track and field athlete to earn direct qualification for the Olympics under modern entry standards, and the first Pakistani athlete to reach the final of any event at the World Championships. At the 2024 Summer Olympics, he became the first Pakistani ever to win an Olympic medal in athletics and the country's first individual Olympic gold medalist. He also won Pakistan's first ever World Championships medal, a silver at the 2023 World Athletics Championships. In 2022, he created a Commonwealth Games record with a throw of 90.18 m and became the first ever athlete from South Asia to breach the 90m mark.

=== Billiards and snooker ===
Snooker is one of the rising sports in Pakistan, and it has been taken up by many people. There has been success at the international level; Muhammad Yousaf was the 1994 IBSF World Snooker Champion and the 2006 IBSF World Masters Champion. Shokat Ali is Pakistan's number one player and an Asian Games Gold medalist. He also won a bronze medal at the 2001 World Games. Ahsan Ramzan has set a new record for amateur snooker and became the 2nd youngest champion in the world after Chinese player Yan Bingtao at World Amateur Snooker Championships. He represented Pakistan at the 2022 World Games held in Birmingham, United States. Muhammad Asif is a three-time winner of the amateur IBSF World Snooker Championship. He turned professional in 2022. The Pakistan Billiards Snooker Association (PBSA) was formed in 1958.

=== Bowling ===
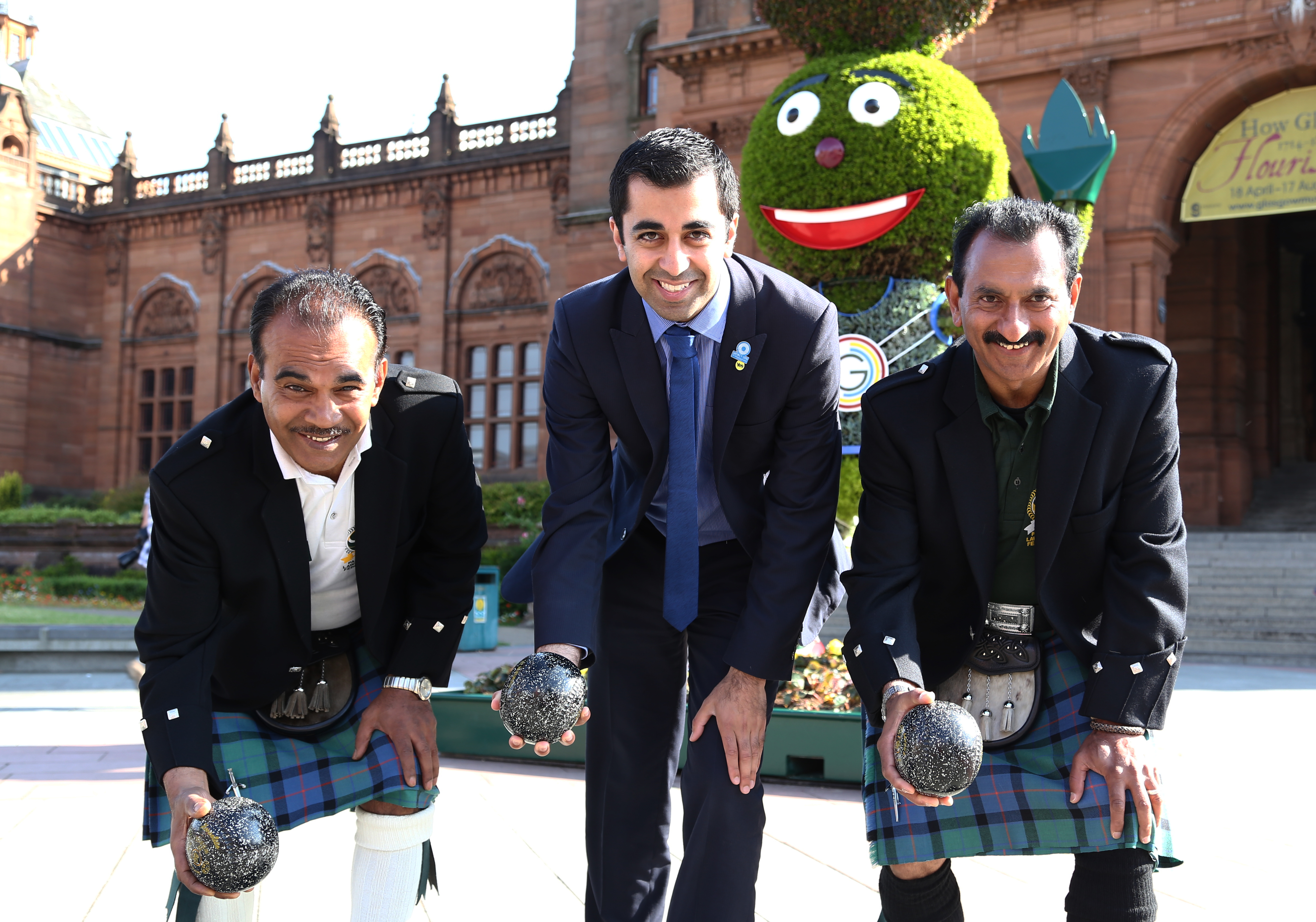
Scottish politician Humza Yousaf with Pakistani bowlers in 2014 Commonwealth Games

Pakistan Tenpin Bowling Federation is affiliated with Asian Bowling Federation and World Bowling. The Federation is affiliated with Pakistan Sports Board.

Mohammed Ayub Qureshi is a lawn and indoor bowler who represented Pakistan in the nation's debut lawn bowls team at the 2014 Commonwealth Games, a historic milestone for a country where the sport was relatively unknown. Though he did not secure medal, his participation helped put Pakistan on the lawn bowls map and inspired greater interest in the sport domestically and among the South Asian diaspora. He also competed in the 10th Asian Lawn Bowls Championship and the 2022 and 2025 World Bowls Indoor Championships, and is a two-time club champion in Glasgow. He once again represented Pakistan at the 2026 Commonwealth Games, competing in both men's singles and pairs alongside Maqsood Wasim Khan.

=== Chess ===
In Pakistan, chess is played throughout the country, mostly in the Mughal style which is slightly different from the international style, but the Chess Federation of Pakistan (CFP) organizes its tournaments in the international style, and according to the established rules. The FIDE has awarded the International Master title to Shahzad Mirza and Mahmood Lodhi.

=== Cycling ===
The Pakistan Cycling Federation is the governing body of cycling in Pakistan. The Tour de Pakistan International Cycling Race starts from Karachi and ends in Peshawar, with about 150 domestic and international cyclists taking part every year. This race is among the largest of such events in Asia, covering a distance of 1,648 km in eleven stages with four days of rest en route. Teams from WAPDA, Pakistan Army, Pakistan Railways, and Sui Southern Gas Company, along with teams of the four provinces regularly take part in domestic and international cycling tournaments. Women's cycling also takes place in the country. Other events are the Tour of Islamabad and the MTB Tour of the Himalayas.

Pakistan has won a total of three cycling medals in Asian Games history, all achieved during the sport's domestic golden era at the 1958 Tokyo Games. At those Games, the legendary Muhammad Shahrukh led the contingent by winning an individual Bronze Medal in the Match Sprint, a Silver Medal in the Tandem event alongside Saleem Farooqi, and another Silver Medal in the Team Pursuit alongside teammates Muhammad Ashiq, Abdul Razzaq Baloch and G. H. Baloch. These remain Pakistan's only Asian Games cycling medals to date, as the country has not won a cycling medal at the Games since. However, modern riders like Ali Ilyas have recently kept the sport alive by winning continental gold at the separate Asian Road Cycling Championships.

Samar Khan is the first woman in the world to cycle on the Biafo Glacier and the first Pakistani to ride a bicycle on snow in Gilgit-Baltistan. She also cycled to Khunjerab Pass, the highest road in the world, and climbed Mount Kilimanjaro with her bike to highlight climate change. Other notable cyclists include Wazir Ali, Arsalan Anjum Muhammad, Muhammad Shafi, Din Meraj, Muhammad Naqi Mallick, Awais khan, Muhammad Hafeez, Imtiaz Bhatti, Sidra Sadaf, Sabia Abbat, Zenith Irfan, Lal Bakhsh and Noorena Shams.

=== Golf ===
Pakistan has qualified for the Golf World Cup a total of 4 times, in 1975, 1977, 1982, and recently in 2009, when they finished joint 22nd out of the 28 qualifying teams. The Pakistan Golf Federation (PGF) run golf in Pakistan. Karachi Golf Club is one of the oldest in the country and it is where the Pakistan Open takes place. The Pakistan Open was founded in 1967 and became an Asian Tour event in 2006. Chris Rodgers won the Pakistan Open in 2006. The 2007 event was held in January and had an increased prize money purse of $330,000 US. Taimur Hussain has been Pakistan's most successful golfer, as he won the 1998 Myanmar Open, becoming the first Pakistani to win on the Asian Tour.

=== Shooting ===
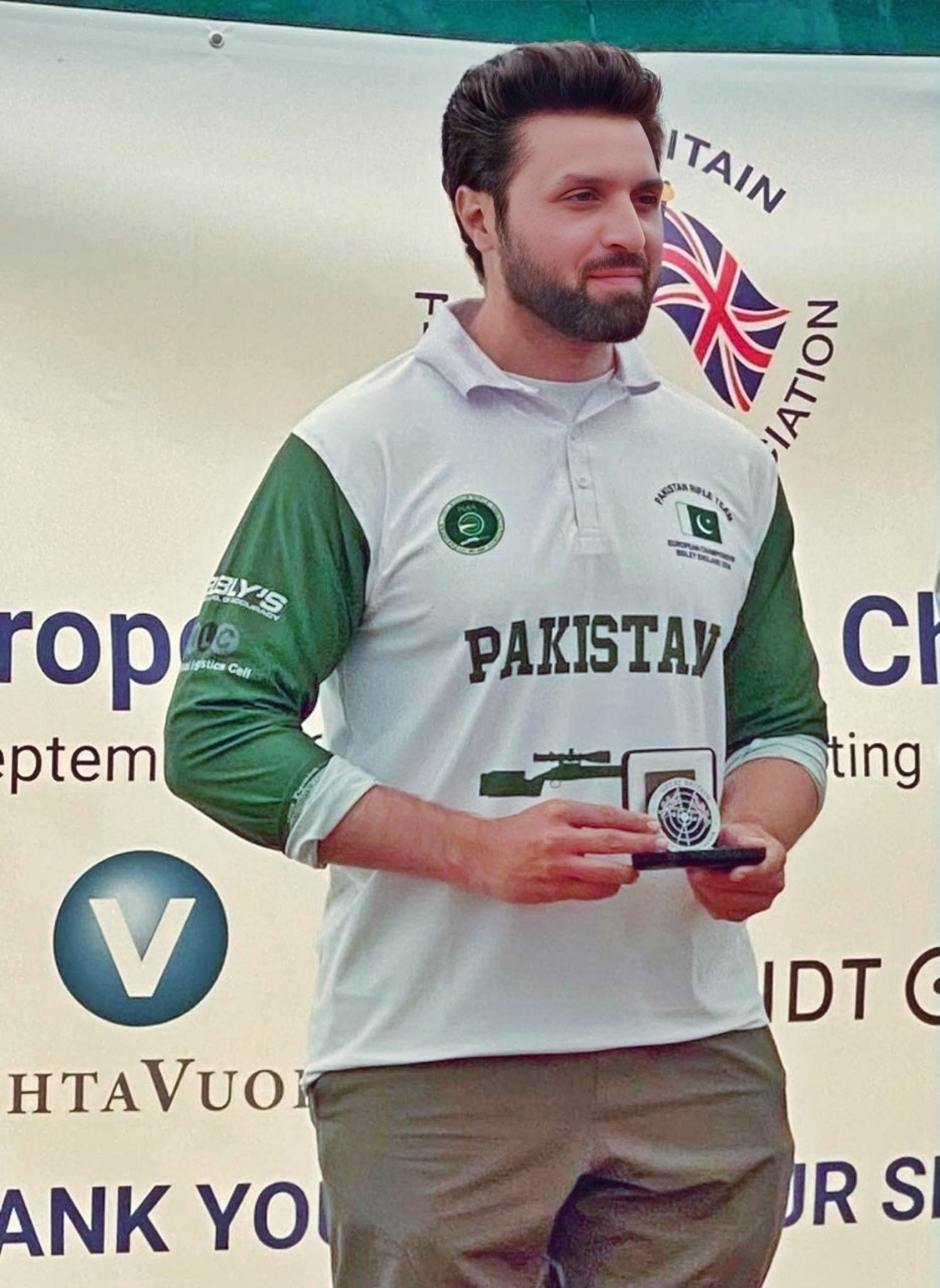
Mohsin Nawaz, first long-range shooter since 1958 to be awarded the Tamgha-e-Imtiaz.

Shooting in Pakistan governed by National Rifle Association of Pakistan. Irshad Ali with one silver and two bronzes in the Commonwealth Games is one of the most successful shooters at international level. Ghulam Mustafa Bashir, a three-time Olympian (2016 Rio, 2020 Tokyo, 2024 Paris), was the flag-bearer for Pakistan during the Parade of Nations at Rio Olympics. He has also represented Pakistan at the 2014, 2018, 2022 and the 2026 Asian Games, winning bronze in the 25 m rapid fire pistol at the 2026 edition in Aichi-Nagoya, his first Asian Games medal and the first by a Pakistani man in shooting at the Games. He became the first Pakistani shooter to win a medal at the ISSF World Championships, claiming bronze in Cairo in 2022. That achievement also earned him a direct quota place for the Paris Olympics and a career-best world ranking of No. 7. He has won over 60 international and national gold medals. He has also secured one gold medal, six silver and one bronze at the South Asian Games in 2016 and 2019.

Kishmala Talat won Pakistan's first Asian Games medal in shooting at the 2022 Asian Games. She also won silver medal in Asian Rifle/ Pistol Championship 2024 Jakarta, Indonesia and became the first woman in the history of Pakistan to get direct berth to Olympics. In the same event with his teammate Gulfam Joseph, she won bronze medal in mix team event.

Khurram Inam, a seasoned Pakistani skeet shooter and three-time Olympian (2000 Sydney, 2004 Athens, 2012 London) is known for representing Pakistan on the world stage over many years. Muhammad Khalil Akhtar, a veteran pistol shooter who was the flag-bearer for Pakistan at the 2020 Summer Olympics. He won a bronze medal at the 2017 Islamic Solidarity Games and has consistently represented Pakistan at major platforms including the Asian Games, Commonwealth Games and World Championships.

Colonel Farrukh Nadeem won gold in the men's individual trap event at the 2026 Asian Shotgun Championships in Doha, scoring 119/125 in qualifying and 27/30 in the final to set new world and Asian records under the updated format, winning Pakistan's first-ever gold in Asian shotgun shooting.

In 2026, Mohsin Nawaz became the first long-range shooter since 1958 to be awarded the Tamgha-e-Imtiaz.

=== Skiing ===
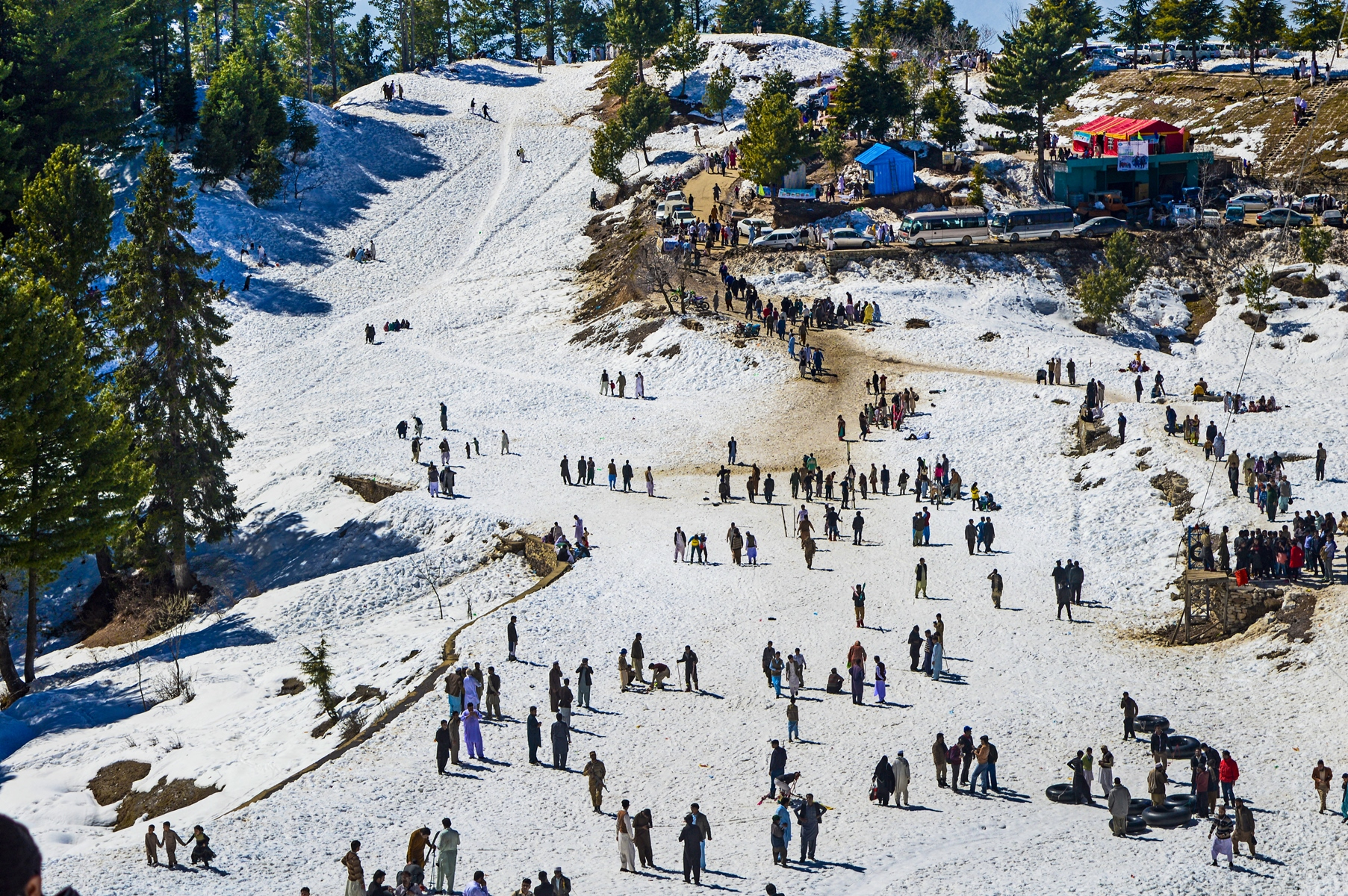
Ski resort in Malam Jabba

The Ski Federation of Pakistan, created in December 1990, runs the sport. Despite being a country with many mountains, the sport has never taken off until the late 1990s. Up until then, it was only done by the Pakistan Army. Now there have been facilities put in place so that the sport can be played, and the Ski Federation of Pakistan now sends out teams to international tournaments.

Muhammad Abbas represented Pakistan at 2010 Vancouver Games becoming the first Pakistani Winter Olympian while Muhammad Karim represented Pakistan at the 2014, 2018, 2022 and 2026 Winter Olympics, becoming the nation's most consistent winter flag bearer. In 2018, Syed Human made history by giving Pakistan its first Olympic appearance in cross-country skiing. Mir Nawaz won silver and bronze medals at the 2011 South Asian Winter Games becoming Pakistan's first ever medalist at any South Asian Winter Games.

Amina Wali is a notable alpine skier and she remained national champion for 15 years. Ifrah Wali made history by becoming the first winner of the Giant Slalom event at any South Asian Winter Games when she won gold at the inaugural games held in India. Mia Nuriah Freudweiler represented Pakistan at the 2020 Winter Youth Olympics, marking the country's debut at the Winter Youth Olympics. Competing in alpine skiing, she finished 46th in the Super-G and 30th in the Alpine Combined events.

== Motorsport ==
The Motorsport Association of Pakistan (MAP) is a member of the Federation Internationale de L'Automobile FIA. The Pakistan National Karting Championship was the first motor racing circuit competition in Pakistan and is used to develop rookie drivers. The Freedom Rally is a yearly off-road race that takes place during the Independence celebrations.

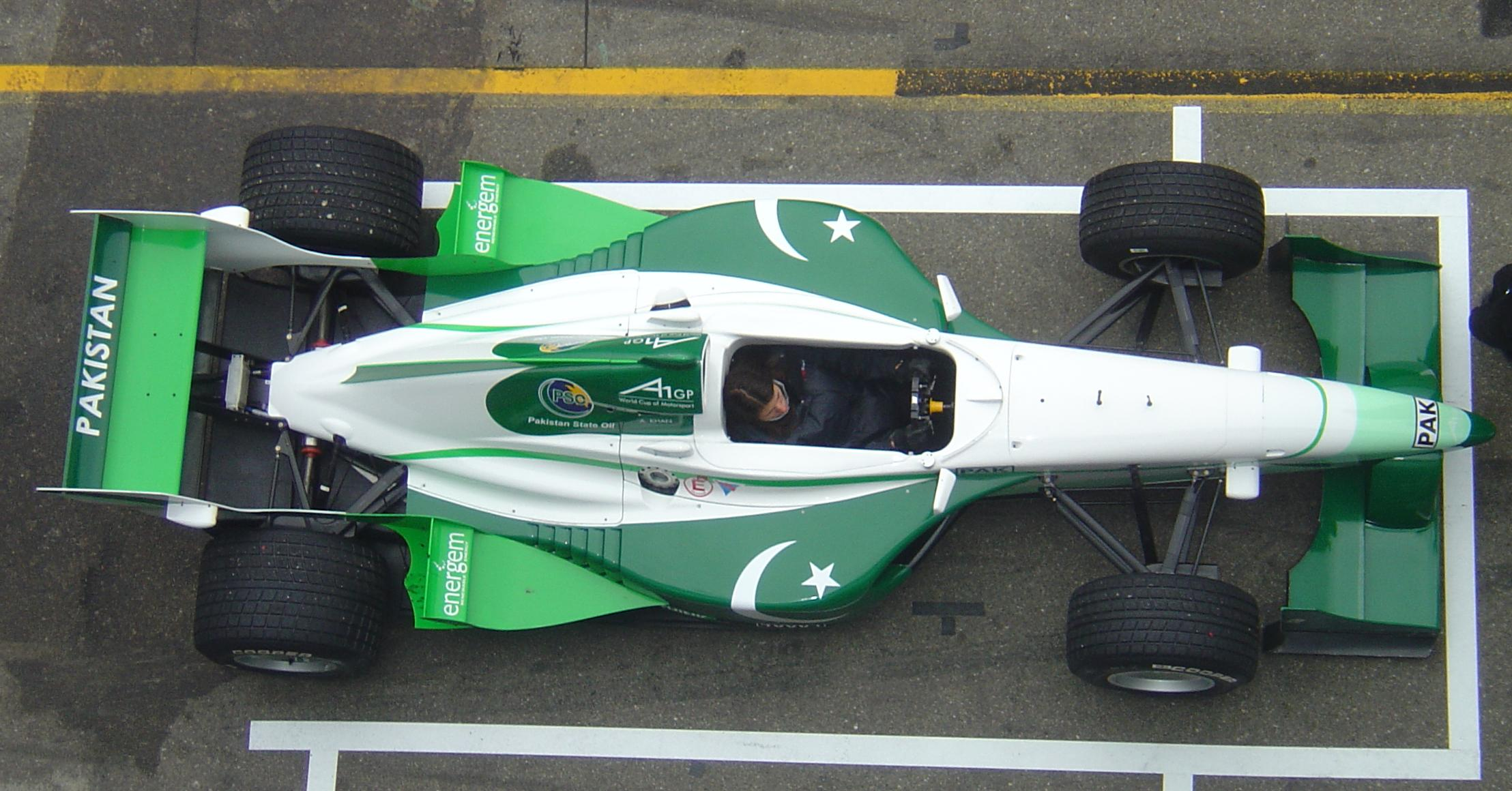
A1 Team Pakistan and their seat holder Adam Khan during a pit stop.

Nur B. Ali was the first Pakistani Racing driver and Co-founded the MAP. He drives in the ARCA RE/MAX Series and is a former two-time Southwest Formula Mazda Regional Series champion. Ali was also the driver of the A1GP Team Pakistan in 2006. Syed Ovais Naqvi is the first local and homegrown professional Pakistani Racecar Driver and he is also the first Pakistani to acquire the International B Racing license, he also co-founded the MAP and is the General Secretary of the body. Ovais was also responsible for putting together the Pakistan National Karting Championship. Omer Younas is currently racing in the Formula BMW Pacific and Adnan Sarwar races in Formula Rolon. In 2005, the A1 Team Pakistan was run by Adam Langley-Khan, Khan remained the Team Pakistan driver until 2008. He also drives in the Euroseries 3000.

Off-road rally is one of the most visible forms of motorsport in Pakistan. Major off-road and desert rally events include the Cholistan Desert Jeep Rally, The Thal Desert Rally and The Jhal Magsi Desert Challenge which are held on desert and off-road terrain in various parts of Pakistan, rural and developing.

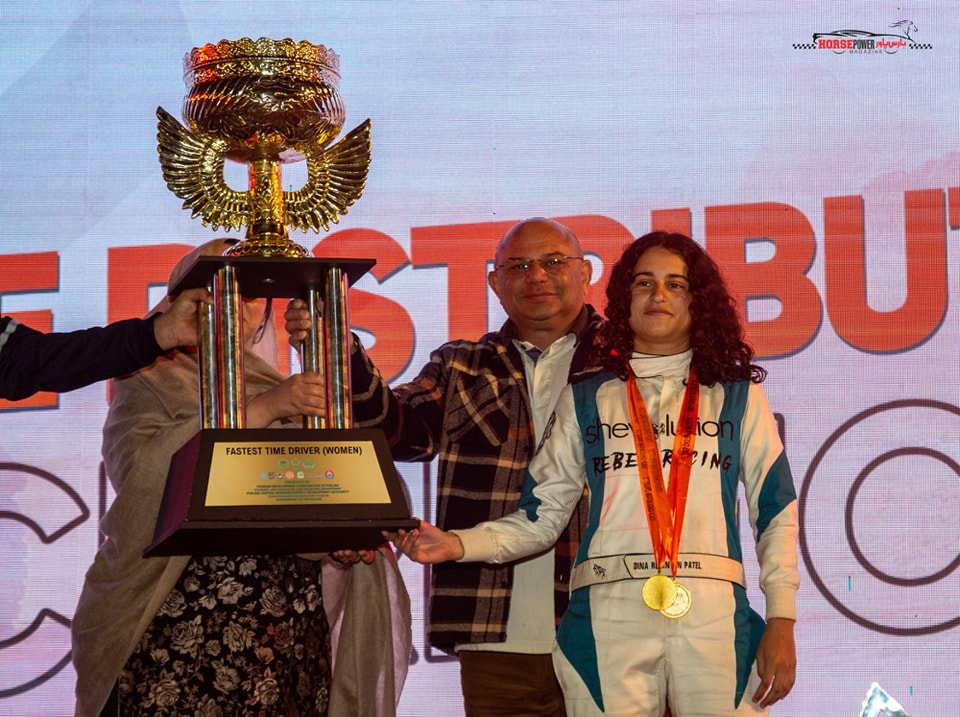
A Pakistani female participant at the International Cholistan Desert Rally 2025

Off-road rallying in Pakistan boasts one of the largest competitive distances with the 19th international Cholistan Desert Jeep Rally spanning over 500 km and three districts Bahawalpur, Bahawalnagar and Rahimyarkhan.

The 19th Edition of the Rally was won by Zain Mahmood with a time of 03:56:54 and Dina Rohinton Patel along with her navigator Ali Aden with a time of 01:07:42.

== Mountaineering ==
With the greatest concentration of the highest peaks of the world many of the mountains have very challenging climbs. Pakistan is a prime location for skilled mountain climbers. Five peaks are over 8,000 meters. The Alpine Club of Pakistan (ACP) founded in 1974, is the national mountaineering and climbing federation. Chiltan Adventurers Association Balochistan is the major affiliated unit of ACP founded in 1984. Nazir Sabir, Ashraf Aman, Hayatullah Khan Durrani, Lt.Col Abdul Jabbar Bhatti, Col Sher Khan, and Meherban Karim are Pakistan's most experienced mountaineers.

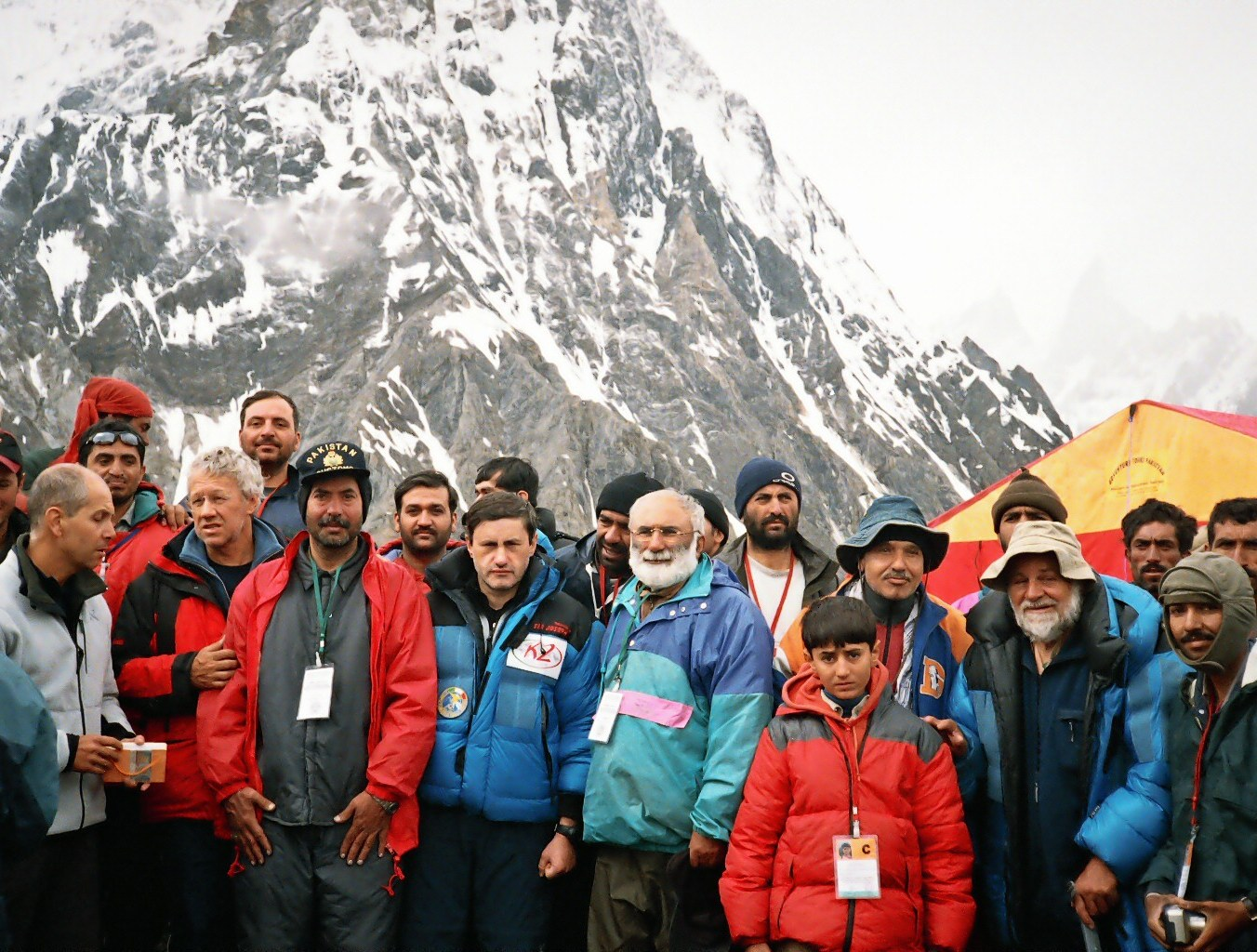
Group of Chiltan Adventurers with Hayatullah Khan Durrani Lino Lacedelli and Gianni Alemanno at Concordia base camp 2004

Pakistan Alpine Institute is the pioneer of "big wall climbing" in Pakistan. Pakistan's First Big Wall Climbing Expedition has been completed by Imran Junaidi and Usman Tariq in September 2013.

Samina Baig is the first Pakistani woman and the third Pakistani to climb Mount Everest. She is also the youngest Muslim woman to climb Everest, having done so at the age of 21. Samina is also the first Pakistani woman and the first Muslim to climb the seven summits. Naila Kiani is the first Pakistani woman to summit 12 of the 14 eight-thousanders. She is one of the ten mountaineers worldwide and the only Pakistani who climbed multiple (7 peaks) above 8000m in less than six months. Kiani is also the fastest Pakistani (male or female) to climb all twelve 8,000-metre peaks in less than three years.

== Weightlifting ==
The Pakistan Weightlifting Federation was formed in 1947. Pakistan has picked up several medals over the years in weightlifting.

At the 2021 World Weightlifting Championships in Tashkent, Talha Talib won the bronze medal in the 67 kg category by lifting 143 kg in the snatch event. This was Pakistan's first-ever medal at the World Weightlifting Championships. Talha was brought into the limelight at the 2020 Tokyo Olympics, where he finished fifth in the men's 67 kg event. This was Pakistan's first top 5 position at the Olympics since 1988 in sports other than field hockey.

Shujauddin Malik won a gold medal at the 2006 Commonwealth Games, followed by Nooh Dastgir Butt, who broke Commonwealth Games record and won the gold medal at the 2022 Commonwealth Games.

Pakistan became the first country in Asia to launch a dedicated Masters Weightlifting Association, solidifying its rising influence on the international weightlifting map. The PMWA fielded a team at the inaugural Asian Masters Championship in Doha in 2025. The 2nd Asian Masters Weightlifting Championship and World Masters Grand Prix 2026 were held from 20 to 25 October at the Liaquat Gymnasium in Islamabad, featuring around 250 athletes from 21 countries.

== Combat sports ==
=== Boxing ===
The Pakistan Boxing Federation (PBF) organises boxing matches in Pakistan. The Pakistan Amateur Boxing Federation (PABF) organizes amateur matches. Pakistan has seen success at amateur-level boxing, despite a lack of necessary equipment and facilities. The Shaheed Benazir Bhutto International Boxing Tournament took place in the KPT Benazir Sports Complex in Karachi, Pakistan from 1–8 January 2010. Amir Khan, the professional British boxing world champion of Pakistani descent was the guest in the final rounds of tournament.

Pakistan has won multiple medals at the Olympic, Asian and the Commonwealth Games. Quetta born Haider Ali won gold at the 2002 Commonwealth Games as a Featherweight and went on to become a professional boxer. Hussain Shah won the bronze medal in the Middleweight division at the 1988 Summer Olympics, becoming the country's first ever and to date the only Olympic boxing medalist. He was South Asia's first boxer to win any medal in Olympic boxing. Shah, who has also to his credit five consecutive gold in the South Asian Games, remained the best boxer of Asia from 1980 to 1988, a rare prominence achieved by any Pakistani pugilist so far. Asghar Ali Shah is a two-time Olympian with 13 gold and 10 silver medals at international level, including a silver at the 2002 Asian Games and gold at the 2005 Asian Championships. Muhammad Waseem won bronze and silver medals at the 2010 and 2014 Commonwealth Games and became the first Boxer in South Asia to challenge for a world title, and the first to be ranked in the top 20. He also won a bronze medal at the 2014 Asian Games. Mehrullah Lassi is best known for winning a gold medals at the 2002 Asian Games, 2005 Asian Championships and a silver medal at the 2006 Commonwealth Games. He represented Pakistan at the 2004 Summer Olympics and served as the country's flag-bearer in the closing ceremony.

Fatima Zahra won a bronze medal at the 2025 Islamic Solidarity Games, becoming the first Pakistani woman to claim an international multi-sport boxing medal. She won another bronze medal at the 2026 Commonwealth Games, becoming Pakistan's first female Commonwealth Games medalist and the first Pakistani woman to win a boxing medal at the Commonwealth Games.

=== Kabaddi ===
Kabaddi is a famous sport in Pakistan. The governing body for Kabaddi in Pakistan is Pakistan Kabaddi Federation. Pakistan won the 2020 Kabaddi World Cup (circle style) at the Punjab Stadium in Lahore, after a close contest against India by 43–41.

Pakistan had won a medal in every Asian Games kabaddi competition until the 2026 edition, where it failed to finish on the podium. Pakistan won bronze medals in the 1990 and 1994 Asian Games. In the 1998 edition, Pakistan bagged silver, losing to India in the final. Four years later, Pakistan won third place in 2002 Asian Games before losing gold to India by 35-23 in the 2006 Asian Games in Doha. Pakistan came third in the next four editions of Asian Games in 2010, 2014, 2018 and 2022. Pakistan became Asian champion in 2012 by beating India in the final of Circle Kabaddi Asia Cup after finishing as runner up in the previous edition. Pakistan became Asian champion for the second time in a row in 2016 after beating India by 50-31 in the final of the Circle Kabaddi Asian Cup. Pakistan has won three medals at the Asian Kabaddi Championship, including two silver medals in 2005 at Tehran and in 2017 at Gorgan and one bronze medal in 2000 at Colombo. Pakistan became champions of South Asia in 1993 by beating archrival India in the final. It was the only time Pakistan became champions of South Asia. After that Pakistani team played as finalists six times and won bronze medals four times but never won another championships.

In 2016, Pakistan became Asian Beach Games champion after beating India by 30-28 in the finals. It was the first title of Pakistan in the Asian Beach Games and before that Pakistan finished as runner up for four times. Pakistan also won a bronze medal at the 2026 Asian Beach Games.

Pakistan secured a silver medal at the inaugural 2024 World Beach Kabaddi Championship in Bandar Anzali, Iran, after losing to the hosts in the final.

=== Karate ===
Karate is the regular event of National Games, the federation also organizes the National karate championship. The Pakistan Karate Federation is the national governing body to develop and promote the sport of Karate in Pakistan. Ghulam Ali and Saadi Abbas have won gold medals at the SAF Games.

In 2011, Saadi Abbas Jalbani became the first ever Asian Champion from South Asian region at the 2011 Asian Championships in Quanzhou, China. At the Asian Games held in Jakarta, Indonesia in 2018, Nargis Hameedullah became the first Pakistani woman to win an individual medal (a bronze) at the Asian Games. This was the first ever medal for Pakistan in Asian Games karate competitions.

=== Mixed Martial Arts ===
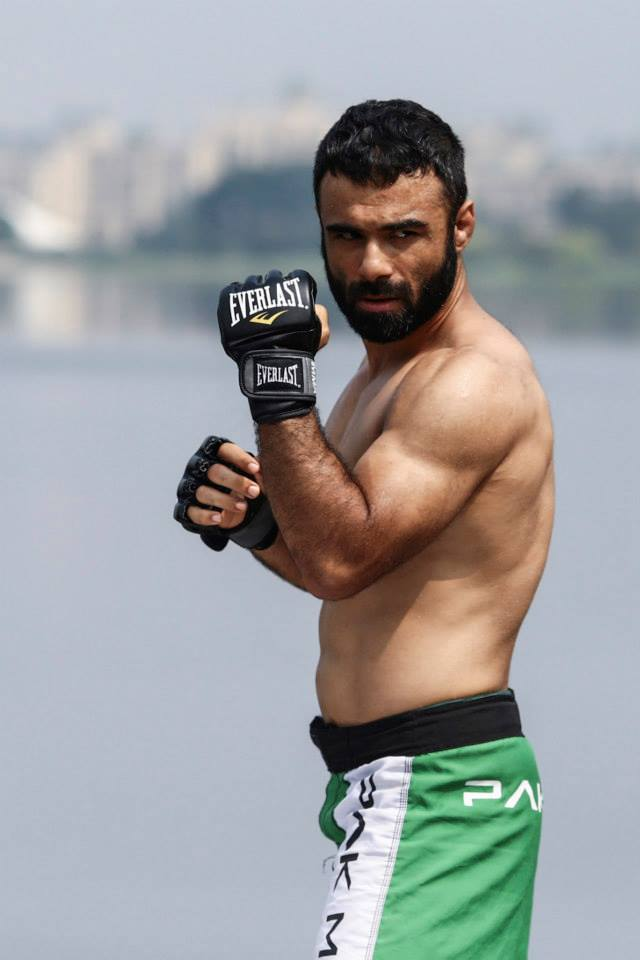
Bashir Ahmad is the founder of Mixed Martial Arts Pakistan

Mixed Martial Arts Pakistan is the premiere mixed martial arts (MMA) and martial arts promotion based in Pakistan that was created in December 2007 by Bashir Ahmad to promote martial arts (and martial sports such as boxing and wrestling) styles in Pakistan with a particular focus on mixed martial arts competition.

Anita Karim is the first international female Mixed Martial Arts fighter from Pakistan to win multiple national and international-level bouts. Manesha Ali won gold for Pakistan at the MMA World Cup in Angola.

Asim Khan made history by becoming the first Pakistani MMA fighter to win a medal at the Asian Games, clinching bronze in the Men's modern 60 kg on the sport's debut at the 2026 edition in Aichi-Nagoya after falling in the semi-final.

=== Taekwondo ===
The Pakistan Taekwondo Federation is the national governing body to develop and promote the sport of Taekwondo in Pakistan. Taekwondo was introduced in Pakistan by Korean Consulate in Karachi in 1962. The federation was established in 1977 and granted affiliation by World Taekwondo. In 1982, the federation was affiliated with the Pakistan Olympic Association (POA) and Pakistan Sports Board (PSB).

It is a regular part of the biannual National Games. The federation organizes the annual National Taekwondo Championship.

=== Judo ===
The Pakistan Judo Federation is the governing body to develop and promote the game of Judo in Pakistan. The federation is based in Peshawar.

Shah Hussain Shah is Pakistan's most accomplished judoka, boasting an impressive record of international medals. He won two bronze medals at the Asian Judo Championships and two gold medals at the South Asian Games. At the 2014 Commonwealth Games in Glasgow, Shah narrowly lost to Scotland's Euan Burton in the -100 kg division finals, securing a silver medal. He added another bronze medal to his collection at the 2022 Commonwealth Games. A trailblazer for Pakistan, Shah made history by becoming the first judoka from the country to qualify for the Olympic Games, representing Pakistan at both the 2016 Summer Olympics in Rio de Janeiro, Brazil and the 2020 Summer Olympics in Tokyo, Japan.

=== Wrestling ===
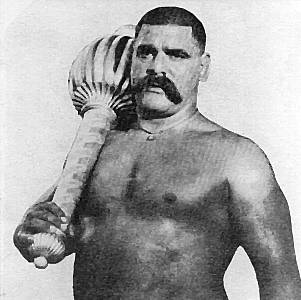
Gama Pahalwan is the best Indian/Pakistani wrestler in history.

Wrestling has always been an important sport in Pakistan, with regular tournaments played locally. Gama Pahalwan was an undefeated World Wrestling Champion from Pakistan. Gama Pahalwan's nephew Bholu Pahalwan also represented Pakistan in wrestling. The Pakistan Wrestling Federation (PWF) is the national governing body of the sport of Wrestling in Pakistan.

Muhammad Bashir won the bronze medal in freestyle wrestling in the welterweight class (73 kg) at the 1960 Summer Olympics in Rome becoming Pakistan's first and to date the only wrestling Olympic medalist. Pakistan's most successful event in the Commonwealth Games has been Wrestling, where it has won 46 medals, 21 of which have been Gold. It ranks 3rd overall in Wrestling at the Commonwealth Games. Inayat Ullah won Pakistan's first individual medal at the Youth Olympic Games in 2018. Other notable wrestlers include Aslam Pahalwan, Muhammad Sardar, Muhammad Niaz, Muhammad Nazir, Siraj Din, Zaman Anwar, Muhammad Umar, Muhammad Niaz-Din, Faiz Muhammad, Muhammad Ashraf, Muhammad Akhtar, Muhammad Bilal, Mohammad Din, Bashir Bhola Bhala, Qamar Abbas, Azhar Hussain, Muhammad Gulzar and Muhammad Inam.

=== Wushu ===
Wushu has grown rapidly into a highly successful combat sport in Pakistan. The sport is officially managed by the Pakistan Wushu Federation, which was established to develop and organize martial arts nationwide. The federation organizes the annual National Wushu Championship and holds regular events at the National Games.

Ijaz Ahmed won a silver medal at the 2010 Asian Games. He is the only silver medalist from Pakistan in any martial arts at the Asian Games. He also won a gold medal at 2006 South Asian Games. Maaz Khan is a three time South Asian Games gold medallist in 2010, 2016 and 2019. Khan also won a bronze medal in wushu at the 2017 Islamic Solidarity Games, and a bronze medal in kickboxing at the Asian Indoor and Martial Arts Games. Maratab Ali Shah is a two-time Asian Games bronze medalist in men's Wushu. He is also a two-time South Asian Games gold medalist and a bronze medalist at 2009 Asian Martial Arts Games in Men's sanshou.

== Aquatic and paddle sports ==
=== Canoe Kayak ===
Abubakar Durrani and Shoaib Khilji are Pakistan National Kayaking Champions.

The Pakistan Canoe and Kayak Federation is the only official governing body of canoe and kayak sports in Pakistan. The headquarters of PCKF is based in the Hayat Durrani Water Sports Academy at Hanna Lake Quetta, one of the major canoe / kayak paddling and Rowing center in Pakistan. PCKF is affiliated on international level with International Canoe Federation International Canoe Federation (ICF) and on Asian level with Asian Canoe Confederation (ACC), and on National level recognised with Pakistan Sports Board. The Kayaking National Champions Mohammad Abubakar Durrani, Mohammad Shoaib Khilji, and Farhanullah Kakar belong to HDWSA and Pakistan Customs Canoe & Kayak team Quetta.

=== Rowing ===
Karachi and Quetta are the major centers of rowing in Pakistan. The National Rowing Championship is the major national event of rowing in the country. The Pakistan Rowing Federation was a founding member of the Asian Rowing Federation. Although Pakistani rowers take part in events, it is considered a minority sport. Rowers like Ali Hassan, Maqbool Ali, Zohaib Zia Hashmi, and Muhammad Asad Khan have won medals at international events and in International School Rowing events. Junior Rowers from Balochistan, such as Mehardil Khan Baabai and Mirwaise Khan Baabai won many medals. Muhammad Akram and Zahid Ali Pirzada, Hazrat Islam competed at the 2000 Summer Olympics in the single sculls and lightweight double sculls events, respectively.

In May 2025, Mohammad Shehzad, a 64-year-old rower, won a gold medal in the 60+ singles category at the Asian Indoor Rowing Championships held in Pattaya, Thailand. Shehzad defeated Indian competitor James Joseph and set a new Asian record with a time of 1:32.30. His victory was celebrated nationally, including by his daughter, Mahoor Shahzad, an Olympian who represented Pakistan at the 2020 Tokyo Games. Pakistan had a strong showing at the championship, securing a total of 14 medals — 10 gold, 3 silver, and 1 bronze. The event, held from May 26 to 31, featured competitions on indoor rowing machines such as the Concept2 ergometer. Other notable Pakistani performers included Abdul Jabbar and Tayyab Iftikhar, who contributed to the country's medal tally.

=== Sailing ===
The Pakistan Sailing Federation is the national body, with Karachi and Balochistan Sailing/Yachting Associations as its major units. Byram Dinshawji Avari, Commodore of Karachi Yacht Club in 1976 and 1980, won gold medals for Pakistan at the 1978 Asian Games in Bangkok, and again at the 1982 Asian Games in New Delhi. Goshpi Avari won the medal with her husband, Byram, at the 1982 Games. She was the first and, until 2010, the only Pakistani woman to have won a gold medal at a major international competition. She also became the first woman in the world to win an Asian Games gold medal in this category. Byram D. Avari also won a silver medal at the Enterprise World Championship held in Canada in 1978. In 2004, Mohammad Tanveer of Pakistan won a silver medal in the Mistral Asian Championship held in Bombay. Shazli Tahir won silver and Junaid Ahmed won a bronze medal in the first CAS International Sailing Championship in April 2008. Muhammad Zakaullah represented Pakistan at numerous international events and won gold medals at the 1986 Asian Games and 1990 Asian Games. Munir Sadiq sailed into the record books in 1998 Asian Games, as his silver medal in the open enterprise class made him the first sailor to win five medals in the Asian Games. He had previously won three gold medals in the enterprise class in 1978, 1986 and 1990, as well as a silver in the same class in 1994. Khalid Akhtar won a gold medal during the 1982 Asian Games in the OK Dinghy. Other notable sailors who competed at the Olympics include Arshad Choudhry, Javed Rasool and Mamoon Sadiq.

=== Swimming ===
Up until recently, swimming struggled as a sport in Pakistan. But there has been a surge in interest, particularly with Rubab Raza. She was the youngest Olympic competitor in Pakistan's history, aged 13 at the 2004 Summer Olympics. Kiran Khan known as "Golden Girl" also came to attention when she won 7 gold medals, 3 silver medals, and 3 bronze medals at 28 National Games in 2001. She represented Pakistan at the 2008 Summer Olympics. Other notable swimmers include Iftikhar Ahmed Shah, Muhammad Ramzan, Muhammad Bashir, Ahmed Nazir, Bisma Khan, Syed Muhammad Haseeb Tariq, Lianna Swan, Jehanara Nabi, Anum Bandey, Mumtaz Ahmed, Adil Baig, Israr Hussain, Kamal Masud and Haris Bandey. Pakistan Swimming Federation is the governing body of swimming in the Pakistan.

== List of sports leagues ==
=== Cricket ===
- Pakistan Super League
- Pakistan Junior League
- Kashmir Premier League
- The Women's League
- Quaid-e-Azam Trophy
- Pakistan Cup
- National T20 Cup

=== Football ===
- Pakistan Premier League
- National Women Football Championship

=== Golf ===
- Pakistan Open

=== Boxing ===
- Super Boxing League

=== Kabaddi ===
- Super Kabaddi League

== Events ==
=== Multi-sport events ===
- National Games of Pakistan
- Quaid-e-Azam Inter Provincial Youth Games
- Prime Minister's University Sports Olympiad
- Special Olympics Pakistan

== International Participation ==
- Pakistan at the Summer Olympics
- Pakistan at the Winter Olympics
- Pakistan at the Paralympics
- Pakistan at the Summer Youth Olympic Games
- Pakistan at the Winter Youth Olympic Games
- Pakistan at the World Games
- Pakistan at the Commonwealth Games
- Pakistan at the Asian Games
- Pakistan at the Asian Indoor Games
- Pakistan at the Asian Para Games
- Pakistan at the Asian Youth Games
- Pakistan at the Asian Beach Games
- Pakistan at the Asian Winter Games
- Pakistan at the Asian Indoor and Martial Arts Games
- Pakistan at the South Asian Games
- Pakistan at the South Asian Winter Games
- Pakistan at the South Asian Beach Games
- Pakistan at the Islamic Solidarity Games
- Pakistan at the Military World Games
- Pakistan at the Cricket World Cup
- Pakistan at the Men's T20 World Cup
- Pakistan at the World Beach Games
- Pakistan at the World Athletics Championships
- Pakistan at the World Aquatics Championships

== See also ==
- List of stadiums in Pakistan
- Pakistan Olympic Association
- Pakistan Sports Board
- List of sports governing bodies in Pakistan
- Traditional games of Pakistan
- List of Pakistani sportswomen
