= Prime Minister's University Sports Olympiad =

National multi-sport event held in Pakistan

- Abbreviation: PMUS Olympiad
- Motto: Sports for youth
- Purpose: Multi-sport events across Pakistani universities
- Frequency: Annual
- Inaugurated: 2024; 2 years ago
- Organisations: Prime Minister's Youth Programme
- Headquarters: Islamabad
- Website: https://pmyp.gov.pk/

Prime Minister's University Sports (PMUS) Olympiad is a national level multi-sport event held in Pakistan, where athletes from universities across the country compete in different sports disciplines. The inaugural edition held in Islamabad started on 20 November and concluded on 23 November 2024. It is organised by the Prime Minister's Youth Programme in cooperation with Higher Education Commission, Pakistan Sports Board, Ministry of Federal Education and Professional Training and Ministry of Information Technology and Telecommunication. It is the largest university level sports competition in Pakistan.

Prime Minister's University Sports Olympiad was launched after the success of the Talent Hunt Youth Sports League, which had completed its second edition in 2023. The Prime Minister's University Sports Olympiad was introduced after Pakistan's lucrative performance at the 2024 Summer Olympics. The Olympiad will serve as a primary source for providing the country with young athletes for upcoming international and continental games.

== History ==
On 20 November 2024, Prime Minister Shehbaz Sharif, inaugurated the first edition of the Prime Minister's University Sports Olympiad in Islamabad. The inaugural event was held at Liaquat Gymnasium. Chairman Prime Minister's Youth Programme Rana Mashhood Ahmad said that "this event will not only foster a spirit of healthy competition but will also serve as a platform for the youth to engage, excel and represent their universities with pride."

== Editions ==
Edition	Year	Arena	Start Date	End Date	Sports	Winner(s)
I	2024	Liaquat Gymnasium	20 November	23 November	10	University of Central Punjab (Men); University of the Punjab (Women)

== 2024 edition ==
The 2024 edition was held from 20 November to 23 November 2024 and includes many events in 10 sports. The sports events were held at Liaquat Gymnasium, Islamabad Sports Complex in Islamabad.

More than 5000 athletes from 46 universities participated in the event. University of the Punjab and University of Central Punjab emerged out as the two leading universities in the Olympiad.

=== Teams ===
University	Region
Abdul Wali Khan University Mardan	Khyber Pakhtunkhwa
Aga Khan University	Sindh
Fatima Jinnah Women University	Punjab
Hazara University	Khyber Pakhtunkhwa
Institute of Business Administration	Sindh
Institute of Business Management	Sindh
International Islamic University	Islamabad Capital Territory
Islamia University of Bahawalpur	Punjab
Isra University	Sindh
Kinnaird College for Women	Punjab
Lahore College for Women University	Punjab
Lahore Garrison University	Punjab
Lahore University of Management Sciences	Punjab
Lasbela University of Agriculture, Water and Marine Sciences	Balochistan
Mirpur University of Science and Technology	Azad Kashmir
Muhammad Nawaz Sharif University of Engineering & Technology	Punjab
Muslim Youth University	Islamabad Capital Territory
National University of Medical Sciences	Punjab
National University of Modern Languages	Islamabad Capital Territory
National University of Sciences and Technology	Islamabad Capital Territory
Pak-Austria Fachhochschule: Institute of Applied Sciences and Technology	Khyber Pakhtunkhwa
Pakistan Institute of Engineering and Applied Sciences	Islamabad Capital Territory
Punjab College of Commerce	Punjab
Quaid-i-Azam University	Islamabad Capital Territory
Rawalpindi Women University	Punjab
Shah Abdul Latif University	Sindh
Sir Syed University of Engineering and Technology	Sindh
Sukkur IBA University	Sindh
Superior University	Punjab
University of Agriculture, Faisalabad	Punjab
University of Azad Jammu and Kashmir	Azad Kashmir
University of Balochistan	Balochistan
University of Central Punjab	Punjab
University of Engineering and Technology	Punjab
University of Faisalabad	Punjab
University of Karachi	Sindh
University of Lakki Marwat	Khyber Pakhtunkhwa
University of Loralai	Balochistan
University of Management and Technology	Punjab
University of Poonch Rawalakot	Azad Kashmir
University of Sargodha	Punjab
University of Sialkot	Punjab
University of Sindh	Sindh
University of the Punjab	Punjab

== Sport events ==
- Athletics
- Badminton
- Field hockey
- Handball
- Judo
- Swimming
- Table tennis
- Volleyball
- Weightlifting
- Wrestling

== See also ==
- Prime Minister's Youth Programme
- National Games of Pakistan
- Quaid-e-Azam Inter Provincial Youth Games
