= Pakistan Tenpin Bowling Federation =

- Sport: Bowling
- Abbreviation: PTBF
- Affiliation: World Tenpin Bowling Association
- Regional affiliation: Asian Bowling Federation
- Headquarters: Islamabad
- President: Ijaz ur Rahman
- (Pakistan)

Pakistan Tenpin Bowling Federation (PTFB) is the governing body of bowling in Pakistan.

== Affiliations ==
The Federation is a member of the Asian Bowling Federation and World Bowling. The Federation is affiliated with the Pakistan Sports Board.

== See also ==
- Sports in Pakistan
