= Pakistan at the 2025 World Games =

- IOC code: PAK
- NOC: Pakistan Olympic Association

in Chengdu, China 7 August 2025 – 17 August 2025
- Competitors: 3 (3 men and 0 women) in 2 sports and 2 events
- Medals: Gold 0 Silver 0 Bronze 0 Total 0

World Games appearances (overview)
- 1981; 1985; 1989; 1993; 1997; 2001; 2005; 2009; 2013; 2017; 2022; 2025

Pakistan will compete at the 2025 World Games held in Chengdu, China from 7 to 17 August 2025.

== Competitors ==
The following is the list of number of competitors in the Games.

Sport	Men	Women	Total
Billards	1	0	1
Squash	2	0	2
Total	3	0	3

== Squash ==
Athlete	Event	Round of 32	Round of 16 / CR	Quarterfinals / CQ	Semi-finals / CS	Final / BM / CF	
Athlete	Event	Opposition Score	Opposition Score	Opposition Score	Opposition Score	Opposition Score	Rank
Noor Zaman	Men's singles	Chen (CHN); W 3–0	Rodriguez (COL); L 2–3	Classification round Nasser (EGY); WO	Classification round Tsukue (JPN); W 1–3	Classification Final van Niekerk (RSA); L 0–3	10
Nasir Iqbal	Men's singles	Steinmann (SUI); L 0–3	Classification round Lutz (AUT); W 0–3	Classification round Pena (ROU); W 0–3	Classification round Gaeano (COL); L 3–1	Did not advance	=19
