= Pakistan at the World Games =

- IOC code: PAK
- Medals: Gold 0 Silver 0 Bronze 1 Total 1

World Games appearances (overview)
- 1981; 1985; 1989; 1993; 1997; 2001; 2005; 2009; 2013; 2017; 2022; 2025

Pakistan competed at several editions of the World Games.

Shokat Ali won the bronze medal in snooker at the 2001 World Games in Akita, Japan.

== Medal table ==
| Games | Gold | Silver | Bronze | Total |
|---|---|---|---|---|
| (Japan) 2001 Akita | 0 | 0 | 1 | 1 |
| Totals (1 entries) | 0 | 0 | 1 | 1 |

== Medals by sport ==
| Sport | Gold | Silver | Bronze | Total |
|---|---|---|---|---|
| Cue sports | 0 | 0 | 1 | 1 |
| Totals (1 entries) | 0 | 0 | 1 | 1 |

== Medalists ==
| Medal | Name | Sport | Event | Year |
|---|---|---|---|---|
| Bronze | Shokat Ali | Snooker | Men's Singles | 2001 |
