= Equestrian Federation of Pakistan =

Sports governing body in Pakistan

- Sport: Equestrian
- Jurisdiction: National
- Abbreviation: EFP
- Affiliation: International Federation for Equestrian Sports
- Affiliation date: 1982
- Headquarters: Sutlej Rangers Headquarters, 33 Zarrar Shaheed Road. Lahore Cantt., Lahore, Punjab, Pakistan
- President: Raja Zarrar Sajjad
- Chairman: Major General Syed Asif Hussain
- Secretary: Rehman Ullah Khan

Official website
- www.efp.com.pk
- (Pakistan)

The Equestrian Federation of Pakistan (EFP) is the national governing body to promote and develop equestrian sports in Pakistan.

Sahibzada Sultan Muhammad Ali is the current president of EFP.

== History ==
It was formed in 1980 and was under the control of Pakistan Army. However, in 2013, the EFP Board of Directors decided to shift its headquarters to Pakistan Rangers. The sport of polo, previously under EFP, was given to Pakistan Polo Association.

== Disciplines ==
The EFP is responsible for the following disciplines:

=== Olympic/FEI disciplines ===
- Dressage
- Endurance riding
- Eventing
- Show jumping

=== International Tent Pegging Federation discipline ===
- Tent pegging

== Affiliations ==
The federation is affiliated with:

- International Federation for Equestrian Sports
- International Tent Pegging Federation
- Asian Equestrian Federation
- Pakistan Olympic Association
- Pakistan Sports Board
