= Jawad Khan =

Pakistani baseball player (born 1989)

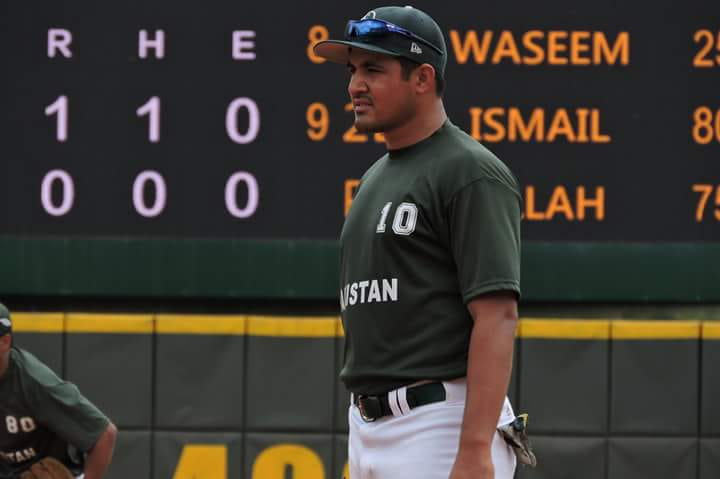
Photo of national baseball player Jawad Khan

Jawad khan (Pashto/Urdu: جواد خان; born 24 December 1989, Swabi District) is a Pakistani international baseball player who bowls left arm fast. He is the second player from Swabi to qualify for the Pakistan national baseball team.
