= Pakistan Women's T20 League =

Pakistani cricket tournament

- Countries: Pakistan
- Administrator: Pakistan Cricket Board
- Format: Twenty20
- First edition: 2023
- Tournament format: Single Round Robin
- Number of teams: 5

The Pakistan Women's T20 League (PWTL) is a proposed professional 20-over cricket league to be contested by women's teams representing different cities in Pakistan. The league was soft-launched on 5 October 2022, by the Pakistan Cricket Board (PCB) Chairman, Ramiz Raja. The league was originally scheduled to be played from 3 to 18 March 2023, featuring four teams and 12 games, at Rawalpindi Cricket Stadium, Rawalpindi. The tournament was later postponed to September 2023, separating its schedule from that of the Pakistan Super League, with the additional announcement that the tournament would now have five teams competing.

In March 2023, three exhibition matches took place as a "test" for the league during the men's Pakistan Super League, between Amazons and Super Women. The series was won by Amazons, who won two of the three matches.
