= Mixed Martial Arts Pakistan =

MMA promoter based in Pakistan

Mixed Martial Arts Pakistan.
- Type: PAKMMA
- Industry: Mixed Martial Arts
- Founded: December 2007
- Founder: Bashir Ahmad
- Headquarters: Lahore, Pakistan
- Website: http://www.pak-mma.com/

Mixed Martial Arts Pakistan (or PAK MMA) is the premiere mixed martial arts (MMA) and martial arts promotion based in Pakistan that was created in December 2007 by Bashir Ahmad to promote martial arts (and martial sports such as boxing and wrestling) styles in Pakistan with a particular focus on mixed martial arts competition.

Mixed Martial Arts Pakistan covers the training of students, promoting events, sponsoring of fighters and the organization also reaches out to the community as well.

== History ==
Bashir Ahmad founded the organization after being inspired by the early UFC events, Bashir Ahmad thought about bringing the sports of Mixed Martial Arts (MMA) to Pakistan. Having a background in different martial arts including Muay Thai, Brazilian Jiu-Jitsu and Boxing, which he studied in Thailand and United States respectively, he started giving free classes in his hometown to all the kids in the community during one of his visits to Pakistan in the winter of 2007.

He stated: "I left the States because I was not ready to join the race. I did not think that money was worth living in suburbia or spending 3 hours of my day in a car going to a job that felt meaningless. It was also because I was really into the whole 'promoting MMA in Pakistan' although at the time I had no idea where things would go."

Returning in the spring of 2008 he rented out a small apartment to start his very own MMA training gym in his home town calling it The Slaughter House, inside the makeshift gym were mats made out of tarp and carpet pads. His students were the same children he trained when he visited Pakistan in 2007. Others from the martial arts community took notice when he started showing Pride and UFC fights explaining MMA was the evolution of combat sports. This served as the first MMA training centre in the country, the gym ran till the spring of 2009 until Bashir Ahmad left his home town to promote MMA in the major cities of the country. "I rented this small place above a restaurant. It was a nasty, filthy restaurant. There was grease all over the floors. It was disgusting. I got it for fifty dollars a month and nicknamed the place 'The Slaughterhouse' because it was so filthy."

Later on as time progressed things became more concrete, with a proper gym opening up in Lahore, Pakistan, now known as Synergy MMA, the gym also serves as the headquarters for PAK MMA and is the epicentre for all major MMA activities in the country and is responsible for all the funding related to MMA PAK. Without support from the government and the martial arts community Mixed Martial Arts Pakistan has now managed to become one of the most prominent organizations in the Asian MMA scene.

Bashir Ahmad achieved an MMA fight record of 4 wins and 3 losses.

== MMA Academies in Pakistan ==
=== Synergy/Shaheen MMA Academy ===
Synergy MMA Academy (formerly known as Shaheen MMA Academy) is the first mainstream MMA gym of Pakistan, it is owned and operated by Bashir Ahmad in Lahore, Pakistan under the PAK MMA banner, the gym is the first of its kind, opening in March 2010, it is the center of all MMA events in the country and is home of Pakistan's first MMA fight team Team Shaheen. The gym organizes and holds many events and fights featuring fighters from all over Pakistan, popularly known as Shaheen Smokers.

=== Vehshi Championship League ===
Vehshi Championship League (VCL) saw the emergence of a second MMA promotion in Pakistan, with their first event "December to Remember" on December 25, 2012. PAK MMA helped VCL establish itself on the MMA scene.

== Milestones achieved by PAK MMA ==
=== First Brazilian JiuJitsu seminar in Pakistan ===
The first ever Brazilian JiuJitsu (BJJ) seminar in Pakistan was organized by Mixed Martial Arts Pakistan in Karachi on 15 December 2010. This event served as the foundation of promoting MMA in the country and as well as getting the name of Pakistan in the international MMA scene.

=== Pakistan Warrior Challenge ===
Pakistan Warrior Challenge, the first MMA event of Pakistan, organized by PAK MMA. It followed the same principle of UFC 1, "Style vs Style", the event took place on 28 February 2010, in Lahore and introduced the country to the sport of mixed martial arts.

=== Synergy MMA Academy ===
Synergy MMA Academy (formerly known as Shaheen MMA Academy) is the first mainstream MMA gym of Pakistan, it is owned and operated by Bashir Ahmad in Lahore, Pakistan under the PAK MMA banner, the gym is the first of its kind, opening in March 2010, it is the center of all MMA events in the country and is home of Pakistan's first MMA fight team Team Shaheen. The gym organizes and holds many events and fights featuring fighters from all over Pakistan, popularly known as Shaheen Smokers. yed a vital role in putting Pakistan on the map of South Asian countries getting into MMA.

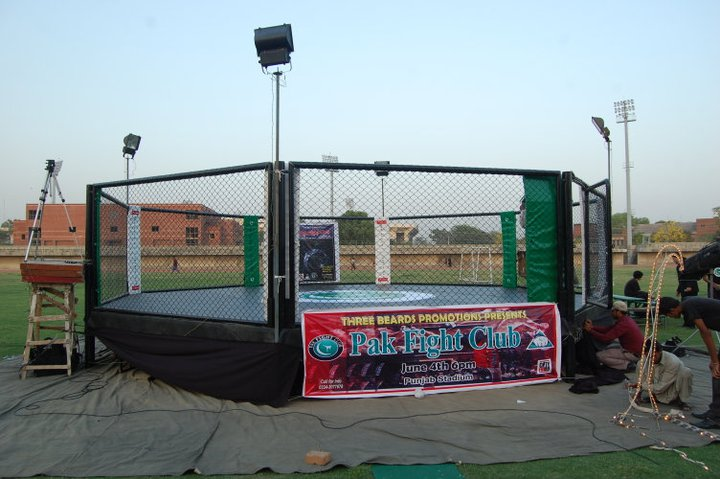
The cage constructed by PAK MMA, affectionately known as "the paktagon".

=== Collaboration with international promoters ===
PAK MMA collaborated with international fight promoters "Three Beards Promotion" in organizing the first professional MMA event in South Asia that was conducted inside an international level octagonal cage, known as Pak Fight Club at the Punjab Stadium in Lahore, Pakistan . PAK MMA was responsible for the construction of the cage and organizing the event, the event was a huge success drawing hundreds of people from all over Lahore.

=== Pak Fight Club ===
The first Pak Fight Club or PFC took place in Lahore, Pakistan which was the first professional MMA event in South Asia. Due to the success of the first, PAK MMA held two more Pak Fight Clubs during the following years. Due to the number of fighters in Pakistan, PAK MMA is holding tryouts before the PFC where fighters earn the right to fight at professional level.

Fighters all over Pakistan come to take part in the PFC, Karachi, Lahore, Islamabad, Gujar Khan, Quetta, Multan just to name a few.

=== Ties with ONE FC ===
Mixed Martial Arts Pakistan has made ties with ONE Championship and is a part of the ONE FC Network, with both organizations sharing talent along with the rest of the ONE FC Network. Mixed Martial Arts Pakistan was present and a part of the ONE Asia MMA Summit 2012, being represented by President Bashir Ahmad.

=== Super Fight League ===
PAK MMA fighters, Shah 'No Pain' Hussain, Ovais Shah, Shams Rehman, Afnan Iftikhar, Nadeem Naeem, Hassan Khan and Waqar Ahmad have been signed to Super Fight League, India's biggest MMA promotion, to compete against the promotion's best while representing Pakistan in their respective weight classes, however the organisation never got back to them.

=== Vehshi Championship League ===
Vehshi Championship League (VCL) saw the emergence of a second MMA promotion in Pakistan, with their first event "December to Remember" on December 25, 2012.

=== Bashir Ahmad's Career in ONE FC ===
PAK MMA founder, Bashir Ahmad made his ONE FC debut against Shannon Wiratchai at ONE FC: Kings and Champions on April 5, 2013, at the Singapore Indoor Stadium in Kallang, Singapore. Bashir won the fight via unanimous decision becoming the first Pakistani MMA fighter to compete and win on an international stage. Bashir made his second appearance later that year on September 13, 2013, against Bruno Pucci. Bashir ended up losing the fight by submission after getting trapped in a rear-naked choke during the opening round. Bashir Ahmad's third fight took place vs Tannaphong Khuhankaew of Thailand on October 17, 2014 in Kuala Lumpur, Malaysia. Bashir won via rear-naked choke in the first round. Bashir Ahmad is now 4-3 as a professional MMA fighter

=== PAKMMA Fighting Alliance ===
PAKMMA launched its own promotion very successfully in 2013, the PAKMMA Fighting Alliance. The Fighting Alliance, headed by Mahmood Rahman, with its association with ONE FC, provides local and international fighters a quality platform to gain experience and make it to ONE FC. "ONE Fighting Championship [ONE FC], the largest MMA promotion in Asia got in touch with Mahmood's Fighting Alliance, lending it legitimacy around a sport that still raises eyebrows."

== Events ==
| Event | Date | Location |
|---|---|---|
| Flogger Contender Series 8 | February 21, 2021 | Punjab, Pakistan |
| Flogger Series 6 | December 12, 2020 | Punjab, Pakistan |
| Flogger Series 5 | October 18, 2020 | Punjab, Pakistan |
| Flogger Contender Series 7 | September 27, 2020 | Punjab, Pakistan |
| Flogger Contender Series 6 | September 4, 2020 | Punjab, Pakistan |
| Flogger Contender Series 5 | July 24, 2020 | Punjab, Pakistan |
| Flogger Series 4 | December 15, 2019 | Punjab, Pakistan |
| Flogger Series 3 | July 13, 2019 | Punjab, Pakistan |
| Flogger Series 2 | February 10, 2019 | Punjab, Pakistan |
| Flogger Series 1 | November 18, 2018 | Punjab, Pakistan |
| Pak Fight Club 4 | April 13, 2014 | Punjab, Pakistan |
| Fighting Alliance 2 | Feb 22, 2014 | Punjab, Pakistan |
| Fighting Alliance 1 | October, 2013 | Punjab, Pakistan |
| Pak Fight Club 3 | April 20, 2013 | Punjab, Pakistan |
| Pak Fight Club 2 | April 14, 2012 | Punjab, Pakistan |
| Pak Fight Club | June 4, 2011 | Punjab, Pakistan |
