= Pakistan women's national table tennis team =

The Pakistan women's national table tennis team represents Pakistan in international table tennis competitions. It is administered by the Pakistan Table Tennis Federation (PTTF). Members of the team compete in singles, doubles, mixed doubles and team events at competitions including continental and regional games (Asian and South Asian Games) and continental championships.

== History ==
=== 1970s ===
In 1972, it competed in the inaugural ATTU Asian Table Tennis Championships held in Beijing, China.

== Team Members ==
Current Members
Name	Club (domestic)	Competitions	Events
Aisha Iqbal Ansari		Asian Games: 2014, 2018; South Asian Games: 2006, 2010, 2016,	
Fatima Khan		Asian Games: 2018	Singles, doubles and mixed doubles
Hareem Anwar Ali		Asian Games: 2018	Singles, doubles and mixed doubles

Former Members
Name	Club (domestic)	Competitions	Events
Ghazala Rohi		South Asian Games: 2004,	
Ghalia Mohsin (also known under her maiden name Ghalia Khursheed)		South Asian Games: 2006	
Kanwal Iqbal		South Asian Games: 2006	
Louiza Irshad		South Asian Games: 2010	
Munira Fikree			
Naila Anjum			
Naseem Nazli			
Nazo Shakoor	United Bank Limited (UBL) (junior); Habib Bank Limited (HBL) (1980 - 1997)		
Rahila Anjum			
Rahila Kashif		Asian Games: 2014; South Asian Games: 2004, 2006, 2016	
Rubina Shakoor	Habib Bank Limited (HBL) (1975 - 1997)		
Rukia Fikree			
Sadia Falak Sher		South Asian Games: 2010	
Sadia Yasin		South Asian Games: 2006, 2010	
Saeeda Sultana			
Seema Shakoor	Habib Bank Limited (HBL) (1976 - 1997)		
Shabnam Bilal		Asian Games: 2014; South Asian Games: 2004, 2016	
Shamim Nazli			

=== Siblings ===
The following sets of siblings have represented Pakistan internationally:

1. Saeeda Sultana and Altaf Ali.
2. Munira Fikree and Rukia Fikree.
3. Rubina Shakoor, Seema Shakoor and Nazo Shakoor.
4. Naseem Nazli and Shamim Nazli.
5. Rahila Anjum and Naila Anjum.

== Results ==
=== South Asian Games ===
Year	Result (singles)	Position	Result (doubles)	Position	Result (mixed)	Position	Result (team)	Position
(India) Guwahati 2016							Finalist	2nd
(Nepal) Kathmandu 2019								

== Medals ==
South Asian Games
Games	Gold	Silver	Bronze	Total
(India) Guwahati (2016)	0	1	0	1
(Nepal) Kathmandu (2019)	0	0	0	0
Total	0	1	0	1
