= Pakistan Polo Association =

Pakistani governing body

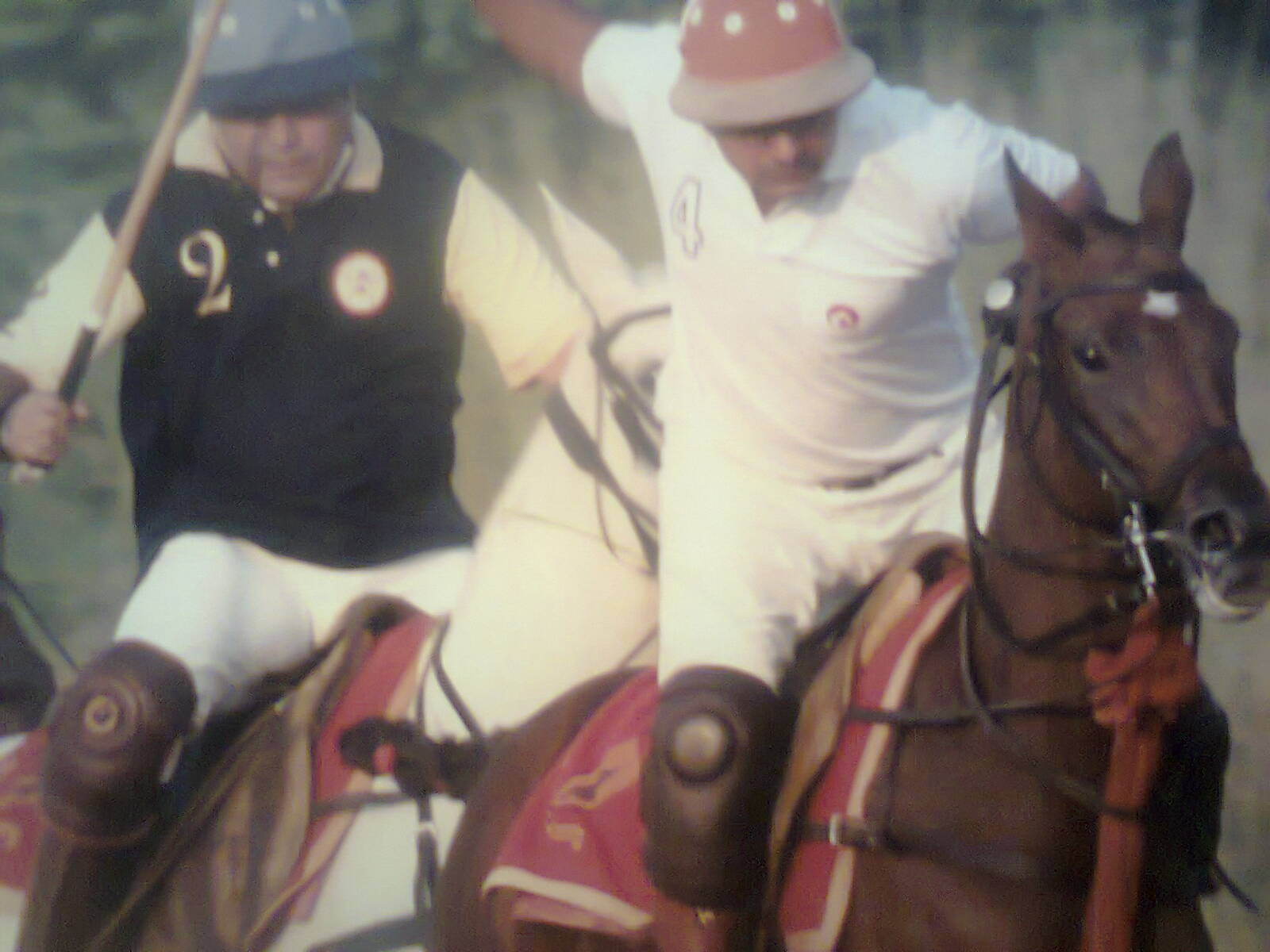
- Sport: Polo
- Abbreviation: PPA
- Founded: 1947
- Headquarters: Islamabad
- Location: President's Bodyguard (Pakistan)
- Chairman: Lieutenant General Khalid Zia
- Secretary: Lieutenant Colonel Awais Adnan
- (Pakistan)

The Pakistan Polo Association (PPA) is the governing body for polo in Pakistan, responsible for promoting and organising the sport nationwide. Established in 1947 as the successor to the Indian Polo Association, the PPA is headquartered in Islamabad.

== Tournaments and Stadiums ==
PPA organizes various levels of Polo in Pakistan mainly 4 goals, 8 goals, and a highest up to 14 goals. Mainly PPA tournaments are held in three major cities of Pakistan: Islamabad, Rawalpindi and Lahore. The Lahore Polo Club (LPC), Lahore Garrison Polo Ground (LGPG), Jinnah Polo Fields (JPF) are host to 10-14 goal Polo while The Rawalpindi Garrison Polo Grounds (RGPG) and Islamabad Club Polo Ground (ICPG) hosts 4-8 goal Polo.

== Pakistan Polo Team ==
The Pakistan Polo Team is administered by the Pakistan Polo Association. It has represented Pakistan in 4 World Polo Championships. Their first participation came in VII FIP World Polo Championship in Chantilly, France while their last representation came at the XII FIP World Polo Championship, 2022 held at The Palm Beaches, Florida, USA. Pakistan falls in Zone E of Federation of International Polo along with Egypt, India, Iran, Jordan, Kenya, Kuwait, Lebanon, Morocco, Nigeria, Oman, Qatar, Saudi Arabia, South Africa, Tunisia, Uganda, United Arab Emirates (UAE), Zimbabwe and Uzbekistan. Overall Pakistan lies in the top 10 Polo playing countries.

=== Members ===
1. Hamza Mawaz Khan (Captain)
2. Raja Temur Nadeem
3. Raja Jalal Arsalan
4. Ahmed Ali Tiwana
5. Bilal Haye
6. Raja Mekayial Sami
7. Sarim Shahnawaz
8. Raja Samiullah
9. Brig(r) Bader-uz-Zaman (Team Coach)
10. Lt Col Ayaz Ahmed (Assistant Team Coach).

== See also ==
- Shandur - The highest polo ground on Earth
- Polo
- Sport in Pakistan
