= Pakistan at the 2022 World Games =

- IOC code: PAK
- NOC: National Olympic Committee of Pakistan

in Birmingham, United States 7 July 2022 – 17 July 2022
- Competitors: 1 (1 man) in 1 sport and 1 event
- Medals: Gold 0 Silver 0 Bronze 0 Total 0

World Games appearances (overview)
- 1981; 1985; 1989; 1993; 1997; 2001; 2005; 2009; 2013; 2017; 2022; 2025

Pakistan competed at the 2022 World Games held in Birmingham, United States from 7 to 17 July 2022.

== Competitors ==
The following is the list of number of competitors in the Games.

Sport	Men	Women	Total
Cue sports	1	0	1
Total	1	0	1

== Cue sports ==
Pakistan competed in cue sports.

Athlete	Event	Round of 16	Quarterfinal	Semifinal	Final / BM
Athlete	Event	Opposition Result	Opposition Result	Opposition Result	Opposition Result
Ahsan Ramzan	Snooker	Aly (USA); W 3–1	Cheung (HKG); L 1–3	did not advance	
