= Liaquat Gymnasium =

Indoor sporting arena located in Islamabad, Pakistan

Coordinates: 33°42′N 73°06′E

- Interactive map of Liaquat Gymnasium
- Location: Islamabad, Pakistan
- Capacity: 10,223

Construction
- Opened: 1985

Liaquat Gymnasium is an indoor sporting arena located in Islamabad, Pakistan. The arena can accommodate 10,223 spectators. It hosts indoor sporting events such as basketball, badminton, boxing and Pro Wrestling competitions. I tis part of the Pakistan Sports Complex.

The Liaquat Gymnasium structure has been built with earthquake-tolerant technology. On 27 November 1986, the 6th PTV Awards show was also held in this complex.

== Exhibitions ==
- PTV Awards
