= Quaid-e-Azam Inter Provincial Youth Games =

- First edition: 2016 edition Islamabad
- Latest edition: 2016 edition Islamabad
- Next edition: 2024 edition Islamabad
- Tournament format: See below
- Most successful: Punjab; Sindh
- Website: www.sports.gov.pk/

The first event of the Quaid-e-Azam Inter Provincial Youth Games in Islamabad. President Mamnoon Hussain opened the first edition. First time Punjab Sindh Baluchistan KPK Islamabad Azad Jammu and Kashmir Gilgit-Baltistan and FATA teams participated Punjab won the first edition. The second Quaid-e-Azam Inter-Provincial Youth Games will start from 25 December with over 3700 participants making it the biggest sporting event in Pakistan.

== Second Edition ==
Second Quaid-e-Azam Inter-Provincial Youth Games will start from 25 December with the participants over 3700 making it biggest sporting event in Pakistan

== Medal table ==
Punjab emerged as champions of the first edition of Quaid-e-Azam Inter-Provincial Games which concluded at the Pakistan Sports Complex in Islamabad.

Team name	Gold	Silver	Bronze	Points
Punjab	61	43	32	2,641
Khyber Pakhtunkhwa	20	17	41	1,331
Sindh	18	22	33	1,285
Islamabad	13	14	25	897
Balochistan	11	18	27	799
Federally Administered Tribal Areas	4	5	23	348
Gilgit-Baltistan	7	5	13	320
Azad Kashmir	1	1	17	182

== Sports events ==
- Athletics
- Badminton
- Football
- Hockey
- Judo
- Karate
- Squash
- Tennis
- Table tennis
- Taekwondo
- Volleyball
