= Snooker at the 2001 World Games – men's singles =

Snooker men's singles at the 2001 World Games
- Venue: Selion Plaza, Akita, Japan
- Dates: 22–26 August 2001
- Competitors: 16 from 11 nations

Medalists
gold medal	(Belgium) Bjorn Haneveer
silver medal	(Philippines) Marlon Manalo
bronze medal	(Pakistan) Shokat Ali

The men's singles snooker competition at the 2001 World Games took place from 22 to 26 August 2001 at the Selion Plaza in Akita, Japan.

== Last 16 ==
Takao Kurimoto (Japan)	3–0	(United Kingdom) Lawrie Annandale
Alex Lely (Netherlands)	0–3	(Philippines) Marlon Manalo
Shokat Ali (Pakistan)	3–0	(Canada) Paul Potier
Quinten Hann (Australia)	1–3	(United Kingdom) Craig Butler
Marco Fu (Hong Kong)	w/o–w/d	(Australia) Johl Younger
Bjorn Haneveer (Belgium)	3–1	(Egypt) Mohamed El Hamy
James Wattana (Thailand)	3–0	(United Kingdom) Luke Fisher
Phaitoon Phonbun (Thailand)	3–0	(Japan) Yutaka Fukuda

== Last 8 ==
Quarter-finals
(Japan) Takao Kurimoto	0
(Philippines) Marlon Manalo	3
(Pakistan) Shokat Ali	3
(United Kingdom) Craig Butler	0
(Hong Kong) Marco Fu	2
(Belgium) Bjorn Haneveer	3
(Thailand) James Wattana	3
(Thailand) Phaitoon Phonbun	1

Semi-finals
(Philippines) Marlon Manalo	3
(Pakistan) Shokat Ali	2
(Belgium) Bjorn Haneveer	3
(Thailand) James Wattana	1

Gold medal match
(Philippines) Marlon Manalo	3
(Belgium) Bjorn Haneveer	4
Bronze medal match
(Pakistan) Shokat Ali	3
(Thailand) James Wattana	0
