= List of sports governing bodies in Pakistan =

This is a list of official sports governing bodies, federations and associations for Sport in Pakistan. All governing bodies are led by or under the supervision of Pakistan Sports Board or Pakistan Olympic Association. Currently, the Board is affiliated with 44 National Sports Federations and 03 departments. Each of these Federations has the responsibility of promoting and advancing their specific sports or games.

== Overview ==
The 18th Amendment to Pakistan's constitution passed in 2010 brought substantial alterations to the country's sports landscape. Consequently, it caused a transformation in the framework and functioning of sports in Pakistan. Among these changes was the decentralization of various federal ministries to the provinces. This encompassed the Ministry of Sports, which was devolved as part of the third and concluding phase of the 18th Amendment. The Pakistan Sports Board, which is responsible for controlling and promoting sports in the country, operates under the Ministry of Inter Provincial Coordination.

== Organizations ==
Organization	Acronym	Sport	Olympic listed	Established	President	Website
Alpine Club of Pakistan	ACP	Climbing	✓	1974	Abu Zafar Sadiq	http://www.alpineclub.org.pk/
Athletics Federation of Pakistan	AFP	Athletics	✓	1951	Muhammad Akram Sahi	http://www.afp.com.pk/
Pakistan Archery Federation	PAF	Archery	✓	1996	Syed Arif Hasan (1950)	
Pakistan Badminton Federation	PBF	Badminton	✓	1953	Wajid Ali Chaudry	
Pakistan Federation Baseball	PFB	Baseball	✓	1992	Syed Fakhar Ali Shah	https://pakbaseball.com/
Pakistan Basketball Federation	PBF	Basketball	✓	1958	Iftikhar Mansoor	https://www.pbbf.com.pk/
Pakistan Bodybuilding Federation	PBBF	Bodybuilding	✓	1952	Tariq Perveiz	
Pakistan Bridge Federation	PBF	Bridge	✓	1972	Khurshid Hadi	https://pakistanbridgefederation.com/
Pakistan Boxing Federation	PBF	Boxing	✓	1948	Jahangir Ahmed	
Pakistan Billiard & Snooker Federation	PBSF	Billiard sports	✓	1958	Munawwar Hussain Shaikh	
Chess Federation of Pakistan	CFP	Chess	✓	1957	Hanif Qureshi	
Pakistan Cycling Federation	PCF	Cycle sport	✓	1947	Syed Azhar Ali Shah	http://pcf.com.pk/
Equestrian Federation of Pakistan	CFA	Equestrian sports	✓	1982	Sahibzada Sultan Muhammad Ali	https://www.efp.com.pk/
Pakistan Football Federation	PFF	Football	✓	1947	Haroon Malik	http://www.pff.com.pk/
Pakistan Flying Disc Federation	PFDF	Frisbee - Flying Disc	✓	1998	Azhar Khan Burki	https://pfdf.pk/
Pakistan Golf Federation	PGF	Golf	✓	1960	Lt Gen Qazi Muhammad Ikram	https://www.pgf.com.pk/#
Pakistan Hockey Federation	PHF	Hockey	✓	1948	Khalid S. Khokhar	https://pakhockey.org/
Pakistan Handball Federation	PHF	Handball	✓	1985	Muhammad Shafiq (1953)	https://pakhandball.org/
Pakistan Judo Federation	PJF	Judo	✓	1988	Col Junaid Alam	
Pakistan Ju-Jitsu Federation	PJJF	Ju-Jitsu	✓	1996	Khalil Ahmed Khan	https://pjjf.org/
Pakistan Kabaddi Federation	PKF	Kabaddi	✓	1964	Shafay Hussain	
Pakistan Karate Federation	PKF	Karate	✓	1988	Muhammad Jehangir	
Pakistan Netball Federation	PNF	Netball	✓	1998	Mudassar Razak Arain	
Pakistan Polo Association	PPA	Polo	✓	1947	Lt. Gen Khalid Zia (R)	
National Rifle Association of Pakistan	NRAP	Shooting	✓	1986	Admiral Amjad Khan Niazi (R)	
Pakistan Rowing Federation	PRF	Rowing	✓	1980	Rizwan ul Haq	
Pakistan Rugby Union	PRU	Rugby union	✓	2000	Arif Saeed	https://pakistanrugby.com/
Pakistan Squash Federation	PSF	Squash	✓	1950	ACM Zaheer Ahmed Baber (1965)	https://pakistansquash.org/
Pakistan Swimming Federation	PSF	Swimming	✓	1948	Zoraiz Lashari	https://pakswimfed.org.pk/
Pakistan Sailing Federation	PSF	Sailing	✓	1969	K G Hussain	
Ski Federation of Pakistan	SFP	Ski	✓	1990	Air Marshal Zahid Mahmood	
Pakistan Softball Federation	PSB	Softball	✓	1990	Muhammad Saleem Khan	
Pakistan Table Tennis Federation	PTTF	Table tennis	✓	1951	S. M. Sibtain	http://www.pttf.pk/
Pakistan Taekwondo Federation	PTF	Taekwondo	✓	1977	Lt. Col (R) Waseem Ahmed	https://pakistantaekwondo.com/
Pakistan Tennis Federation	PTF	Tennis	✓	1947	Salim Saifullah Khan	https://paktenfed.com.pk/
Pakistan Tenpin Bowling Federation	PTBF	Bowling	✓	1991	Ijaz ur Rahman	https://ptbf.org.pk/
Pakistan Volleyball Federation	PVF	Volleyball	✓	1955	Chaudhry Muhammad Yaqoob	https://pakistanvolleyball.pk/
Pakistan Weightlifting Federation	PWLF	Weightlifting	✓	1947	Brig (R) Zahid Iqbal	
Pakistan Wrestling Federation	PWF	Wrestling	✓	1953	Muhammad Abdul Mobeen	
Pakistan Wushu Federation	PWF	Wushu	✓	1962	Malik Iftikhar Ahmed	https://www.pakistanwushu.com/
Pakistan Canoe and Kayak Federation	PCKF	Canoeing & Kayaking	✓	2009	Malik Abdul Rahim Baabai	https://www.pcakf.com/
Pakistan Tchoukball Federation	PTF	Tchoukball	✓	1970	Basit Shakeel Hashmi	
Pakistan Soccer Futsal Federation	PSFF	Futsal	✓	2014	Tariq Mehmood	https://psff.com.pk/
Pakistan Hang Gliding and Paragliding Association	PHPA	Hang gliding & Paragliding	✓	2017	Syed Sajjad Hussain Shah	https://phpa.org.pk/
Pakistan Long Range Rifle Association	PLRRA	Long range shooting	✓			
Motorsport Association of Pakistan	MAP	Auto racing	✓		Abdul Wahid	https://motorsportpakistan.com.pk/
Pakistan Federation of Roller Skating	PFRS	Roller skating	✓		Khalid Saeed	
Pakistan Fencing Federation	PFF	Fencing	✓		Jawed Salim Qureshi	https://fencing.pk/
Pakistan Floorball Federation	PFF	Floorball	✓		Mukarram Ali	
Pakistan Gymnastics Federation	PGF	Gymnastics	✓		Ahmed Ali Rajput	
Pakistan Korfball Federation	PKF	Korfball	✓			
Pakistan Mas-Wrestling Federation	PMWF	Mas-wrestling	✓		Brig (R) Azam Effendi	https://maswrestlingpak.com/
Pakistan Modern Pentathlon Federation	PMPF	Modern Pentathlon	✓		Riaz Fatyana	https://pakpentathlon.com/
Pakistan Orienteering Association	POA	Orienteering	✓			
Pakistan Triathlon Federation	PTF	Triathlon	✓		Asif Amin Sheikh	
Pakistan Tug of War Federation	PTWF	Tug of war	✓		Mohsin Latif	
Racquetball Association of Pakistan	RAP	Racquetball	✓			
Pakistan Cricket Board	PCB (Note: From February 2024, PCB has been brought under Cabinet Division)	Cricket	✓		Mohsin Raza Naqvi	https://www.pcb.com.pk/
Pakistan Blind Cricket Council	PBCC	Blind cricket	✓		Syed Sultan Shah	https://www.pbcc.org.pk/
Pakistan Disabled Cricket Association	PDCA	Disabled cricket	✓			https://pdca.com.pk/
Pakistan Wheelchair Cricket Association	PLRRA	Wheelchair cricket	✓			https://pwcc-cricket.com.pk/
