= Pakistan Olympic Association =

National Olympic organisation in Pakistan

- Country: Pakistan
- Code: PAK
- Created: 1948; 78 years ago
- Recognized: 1948
- Continental Association: OCA
- Headquarters: Lahore, Pakistan
- President: Abid Qadri Gillani
- Secretary General: Muhammad Khalid Mahmood
- Website: nocpakistan.org

The Pakistan Olympic Association (POA; Urdu: پاکستان اولمپک ایسوسی ایشن; IOC Code: PAK), is the national Olympic organisation in Pakistan. It was established in 1948 to oversee the active participation of the newly independent state at the Olympiad. Muhammad Ali Jinnah, the country's founder and first Governor-General, became the patron-in-chief of the new institution, and Ahmed E.H. Jaffar became its first President.

Over the years, the association has been responsible for fundraising and setting up the management of delegations for the Olympic Games. As an NOC, the association is the first contact point for the International Olympic Committee. Some of its members are also active participants in various management activities at the IOC. Within the country, the association remains the oldest sports body. It was the premier regulator of sports activities in Pakistan from 1948 until the establishment of Pakistan Sports Board in 1962.

The Association continues to develop programmes in co-ordination with its affiliated bodies to promote sports at various levels. It is also responsible for Pakistan's representation at the Commonwealth Games and organising the annual National Games.

== Recognition ==
After the independence of the country from the British Raj on 14 August 1947, the need was immediately realised to promote the culture of sports within the country and ensure wider participation and recognition at international level. In this respect, POA was affiliated by the International Olympic Committee in 1948. Subsequently, it also became a member of the Association of National Olympic Committees (ANOC) and the Olympic Council of Asia (OCA).

== POA Presidents ==
List of presidents is given below:

Name	Tenure
Ahmad EH Jaffer	25 February 1949 – 27 February 1950
Malik Ghulam Muhammad	27 February 1950 – 5 November 1951
Abdur Rab Nishtar	5 November 1951 – 21 August 1955
Chaudhry Mohammad Ali	21 August 1955 – September 1956
Huseyn Suhrawardy	September 1956 – 6 March 1958
Feroz Khan	16 March 1958 – 16 November 1958
Azam Khan	16 November 1958 – 22 September 1963
Rana Abdul Hamid Khan	22 September 1963 – 3 April 1972
Malik Meraj Khalid	3 April 1972 – November 1977
Syed Wajid Ali	3 March 1978 – 11 March 2004
Syed Arif Hasan	11 March 2004 – 1 January 2024
Abid Qadri Gillani	2 January 2024 – present

== POA Executive Committee ==
Designation	Name
President	Abid Qadri Gillani
IOC Member	Syed Shahid Ali
Vice-President	Syed Aqil Shah
Vice-President	Chaudhry Yaqoob
Vice-President	Shaukat Javed
Vice-President	Brig. Muhammad Zaheer Akhtar
Vice-President	Khalid Saleem
Vice-President	Syed Muhammad Abid Qadri
Vice-President	Begum Ishrat Ashraf
Vice-President	Fatima Lakhani
Secretary General	Muhammad Khalid Mahmood
Treasurer	Muhammad Shafiq
Deputy Secretary General	Muhammad Jahangir
Associate Secretary General	Ahmad Ali Rajput
Associate Secretary General	Zulfiqar Ali Butt
Associate Secretary General	Rizwan-ul-Haq Razi
Associate Secretary General	Hafiz Imran Butt
Associate Secretary General	Ahmar Mallick
Associate Secretary General	Veena Salman Masud
Executive Member	Ahmad Yahya Khan
Executive Member	Muhammad Rashid Malik
Executive Member	Nargis Maqbool Rahimtoola
Executive Member	Saba Shamim Akhtar
Executive Member	Sumera Sattar
Executive Member	Wajid Ali Choudhry

== Affiliated associations ==
The association controls its memberships through the working of its Affiliation and Constitution Committee, which is composed of the provincial sports bodies and POA officials. The following are the major sports federations and associations affiliated with the POA:

=== Provincial Olympic Associations ===
- Balochistan Olympic Association
- Khyber Pakhtunkhwa Olympic Association
- Punjab Olympic Association
- Sindh Olympic Association
- Kashmir Olympic Association

=== Services organisations ===
- Pakistan Army
- Pakistan Navy
- Pakistan Air Force
- Pakistan Railways
- Pakistan Police
- Water & Power Development Authority (WAPDA)
- Higher Education Commission (HEC)

=== National sports federations ===
==== IOC permanent Olympic sports ====
Sport	National Federation
Aquatics	Pakistan Swimming Federation
Archery	Archery Federation of Pakistan
Athletics	Athletics Federation of Pakistan
Badminton	Pakistan Badminton Federation
Basketball	Pakistan Basketball Federation
Boxing	Pakistan Boxing Federation
Canoeing	Pakistan Canoe and Kayak Federation
Cycling	Pakistan Cycling Federation
Equestrian	Equestrian Federation of Pakistan
Fencing	Pakistan Fencing Federation
Football	Pakistan Football Federation
Golf	Pakistan Golf Federation
Gymnastics	Pakistan Gymnastic Federation
Handball	Pakistan Handball Federation
Hockey	Pakistan Hockey Federation
Judo	Pakistan Judo Federation
Modern pentathlon	Pakistan Modern Pentathlon Federation
Rowing	Pakistan Rowing Federation
Rugby	Pakistan Rugby Union
Sailing	Pakistan Sailing Federation
Shooting	National Rifle Association of Pakistan
Table tennis	Pakistan Table Tennis Federation
Taekwando	Pakistan Taekwondo Federation
Tennis	Pakistan Tennis Federation
Triathlon	Pakistan Triathlon Federation
Volleyball	Pakistan Volleyball Federation
Weightlifting	Pakistan Weightlifting Federation
Wrestling	Pakistan Wrestling Federation

==== IOC Winter Olympic sports ====
Sport	National federation
Skating	Pakistan Skating Association
Skiing	Ski Federation of Pakistan

==== IOC recognised sports ====
Sport	National federation
Air sports	All Pakistan Aeromodelling and Ultra Light Association
Auto racing	Motorsport Association of Pakistan
Baseball	Pakistan Federation Baseball
Bowling	Pakistan Bowling Federation
Bridge	Pakistan Bridge Federation
Canoeing	Pakistan Canoe and Kayak Federation
Chess	Chess Federation of Pakistan
Cricket	Pakistan Cricket Board
Floorball	Pakistan Floorball Federation
Karate	Pakistan Karate Federation
Korfball	Pakistan Korfball Federation
Lifesaving	Pakistan Aquatic Life Saving
Mountaineering and climbing	Alpine Club of Pakistan
Netball	Pakistan Netball Federation
Orienteering	Pakistan Orienteering Association
Polo	Pakistan Polo Association
Racquetball	Racquetball Association of Pakistan
Roller sports	Pakistan Federation of Roller Skating
Rowing	Pakistan Rowing Federation
Softball	Pakistan Softball Federation
Squash	Pakistan Squash Federation
Sumo	Pakistan Sumo Federation
Tug of war	Pakistan Tug of War Federation
Wushu	Pakistan Wushu Federation

==== Others ====
The following are the federations of sports not considered by the IOC as a 'sport':

Sport	National Federation
Bodybuilding	Pakistan Bodybuilding Federation
Ball hockey	Pakistan Street and Ball Hockey Federation
Darts	Pakistan Darts Federation
Fishing	Pakistan Game Fishing Association
Fistball	Pakistan Fistball Federation
Ju-jitsu	Pakistan Ju-Jitsu Federation
Kabaddi	Pakistan Kabaddi Federation

== See also ==
- Sport in Pakistan
- Pakistan at the Olympics
- Pakistan at the Commonwealth Games
