= Pakistan Golf Federation =

Sports governing body in Pakistan

- پاکستان گالف فیڈریشن
- Sport: Golf
- Jurisdiction: National
- Membership: 13 affiliated bodies (Army, Air Force, Navy, WAPDA, Police, HEC, Railways, SNGPL) and 51 golf courses
- Abbreviation: PGF
- Founded: 17 May 1960; 66 years ago
- Affiliation: International Golf Federation
- Regional affiliation: Asia-Pacific Golf Confederation
- Headquarters: Rawalpindi
- Location: First Floor, Driving Range Complex, Rawalpindi Golf Club, Jhelum Road, Rawalpindi, Pakistan
- President: Lt Gen Qazi Muhammad Ikram, HI (M)
- Vice president: Mr. Khurram Khan
- Secretary: Brigadier Sajid Akram, SI (M) (Retd)

Official website
- www.pgf.com.pk
- (Pakistan)

The Pakistan Golf Federation, also known as the PGF, is the national association of golf courses, clubs and facilities and the governing body of golf in Pakistan.

There are around 49 private golf clubs and 19,000 members of PGF.

== History ==
=== Early years (pre-Partition–1960) ===
Golf was introduced in the Indian subcontinent during the British colonial rule. At the time of independence of Pakistan in 1947, Lahore Gymkhana golf course was the oldest course in the West wing, located at Mian Mir and containing only 9 holes. Peshawar Golf Course was also in existence then, and had hosted the Deane Cup in 1906. All the major cities in West Pakistan had a golf course. On the other hand, East Pakistan only had the Kurmitola Golf Course in Dhaka.

The pioneers of golf in the country were Tajuddin Salimi of the Lahore-based Pakistan West Railways Club, Rashid Habib of Karachi Golf Club, and Major Mohsin Ali (from East Pakistan). Until 1958, the main centres of golf activities were the Lahore Gymkhana, Pakistan West Railways Golf Club (both in West Pakistan), and Tea Estate Golf Clubs in East Pakistan.

When the World Amateur Gold Council was formed in May 1958, Pakistan was not among its founding members. The first World Amateur Team Championship was organized by The R&A at Old Course at St Andrews, Scotland in October 1958. Pakistan's absence from these major developments compelled its regular golfers to realize that a governing body for the sport should be established.

=== Pakistan Golf Union (1960–1982) ===
During the initial years of independence, golf was only played by civil service and military personnel. To promote the game among the general population, Pakistan Golf Union was formed on 17 May 1960 with Dacca Golf Club, Karachi Golf Club, Lahore Gymkhana Golf Club, Pakistan West Railways Golf Club (Lahore), Peshawar Golf Club, and Rawalpindi Golf Club being the founding member clubs.

These clubs elected the first council of management on 9 July 1960. Justice Alvin Robert Cornelius was its first President, and Tajuddin Salimi its first secretary. Other members were R.D. Habib (vice president), R.W. Kent, R. Grant, Safdar Rashid, Brigadier K. Wasiuddin, and M. Heald.

Pakistan's first participation in an international competition came in the 1962 Eisenhower Trophy, with the four-member team of Habib, Salimi, M.M. Hashim Khan, and M. Ibrahim Musa representing their country. Following this, two domestic tournaments were established – the National Amateur Golf Championship (NAGC) in 1961, and the Pakistan Open in 1967.

The introduction of domestic tournaments helped promote the game in the country. In 1961, J.G. Donwine won the first men's National Amateur Golf Championship, held at the Rawalpindi Golf Club, while Mrs. Hastings won the ladies' tournament. Ibrahim Musa was the first Pakistani to win the championship, when he won the 1962 edition held at Lahore Gymkhana Golf Club, while Ghazala Ansari became the first Pakistani woman to lift the championship, when she did so in 1964. Aameen Taqi Butt won the inaugural Pakistan Open in 1967 at the Lahore Gymkhana.

The late 1960's saw the emergence of Taimur Hassan Amin. He reached the final of the Ceylon Amateur Championship in 1967, and later became the first Pakistani to win a championship abroad. In 1971, he became the youngest player to win the National Amateur Golf Championship at the age of 18, a record that stood for 50 years. He won the Sri Lanka Amateur Championship in 1975. Two years later, he won the individual position at the Asia Amateur Team Championships at Kuala Lumpur. Domestically, Amin won 17 NAGC's (including 12 in a row from 1971 to 1981), and 3 Pakistan Opens.

=== Pakistan Golf Federation (1982–present) ===
Pakistan Golf Union was replaced by Pakistan Golf Federation under a new sports policy introduced in 1982. Lt. General (Retd) Faiz Ali Chishti served as its first president. The Pakistan Open was added as the 11th member of the Asian Golf Circuit in 1989, with plans for it to be held in alternate years. However, it proved to be only a one-off event.

Moreover, three Pakistan Masters were played in the 1990s as part of the Asian Tour – in 1995, 1996, and 1997. In 1998, Taimur Hassan won the Myanmar Open as part of the Asian PGA Tour, making him the only Pakistani to have won on the Asian Tour so far.

In 2004, Lt. Gen. Ashfaq Parvez Kayani was elected as the president of the PGF, with Taimur Hassan as the secretary. Pakistan Open returned as part of the 2006 Asian Tour, with Chris Rodgers of England emerging as the winner at the Karachi Golf Club. Soon afterwards, The R&A pledged an annual grant of 10,000 pounds for the next three years to create a platform for the golf teachers of Pakistan. Lessons on 'How to Teach Golf' were organized in Islamabad, Karachi, and Lahore by its representatives, and plans were formulated to establish a golf academy in Islamabad. Pakistan Open was also a part of the 2007 Asian Tour, and was won by Airil Rizman of Malaysia.

Kayani was re-elected in 2009, the same year Pakistani golfers, Mohammed Shabbir Iqbal and Mohammed Munir, qualified for the Golf World Cup for the first time by finishing in the top three at the Asian qualifiers. In the World Cup, held in China, Pakistan beat Spain and Canada on its way to a 22nd-place finish.

After a hiatus of 11 years, Pakistan Open was included on the Asian Tour as the Chief of Naval Staff Open Golf Championship. It was won by Tirawat Kaewsiribandi of Thailand.

In May 2022, the Chief of Naval Staff-Pakistan Open was included on the Asian Tour for the first time since 2018. It is set to be held from 1–4 December 2022 at the Karachi Golf Club with a prize purse of US$500,000.

== Affiliations ==
The federation is affiliated with:

- International Golf Federation
- Asia-Pacific Golf Confederation
- Pakistan Olympic Association
- Pakistan Sports Board

== Affiliated bodies ==
The following bodies are affiliated with the federation:

- Balochistan Golf Association
- Federal Golf Association
- Khyber Pakhtoonkhwa Golf Association
- Punjab Golf Association
- Sindh Golf Association
- Azad Jammu & Kashmir Golf Association
- Gilgit Baltistan Golf Association

== Golf courses ==
There are a total 51 golf courses registered with the PGF: 25 9-hole courses, 20 18-hole courses, and 3 27-hole courses.
