= Punjab Warriors (Pakistani rugby team) =

- Founded: 2011
- Location: Punjab, Pakistan
Team kit

The Punjab Warriors are a Pakistani rugby team. They play in the Pakistan Super XV League and serve as a Punjab select side under the jurisdiction of the Punjab Rugby Association. Presumably this team does not include players from Lahore RFC, as that club functions independently.

== History ==
Pakistan Warriors was founded in 2011 Abdul Rahim Khan. They squared off against powerhouses Lahore RFC in the Pakistan Super XV League played as part of the Azadi Cup, losing 5-20. In January 2012 they faced the Indian side Delhi Shers (formerly known as the Delhi Lions) who were on tour in Pakistan.
