= PBF =

PBF or Pbf may refer to:

== Organizations ==
- PBF Energy, a petroleum refiner and supplier
- Pakistan Business Forum, an apex advocacy group for trade and industry of Pakistan
- Pittsburgh Bureau of Fire, provides of fire protection to the city of Pittsburgh, Pennsylvania
- Public Benefit Flying organizations, volunteer pilot groups under the auspices of the Air Care Alliance

=== Sports ===
- Pakistan Badminton Federation, the governing body for the sport of badminton in Pakistan
- Pakistan Boxing Federation, the governing body of amateur boxing in Pakistan
- Pakistan Bridge Federation, the sport governing body for the game of Bridge in Pakistan
- Palestinian Basketball Federation, the governing body of basketball in Palestine
- Paraguayan Basketball Federation, the governing body of basketball in Paraguay
- Philippine Bowling Federation, a duly-accredited governing body of Tenpin Bowling in the Philippines

== Other ==
- Bolsa Floresta (PBF), a program to encourage conservation of forests through sustainable use
- Grider Field (IATA code: PBF), a public airport five miles southeast of Pine Bluff, in Jefferson County, Arkansas
- PbF, a designation on many electronic components indicating a "Pb free" status
- The Perry Bible Fellowship, a newspaper comic strip and webcomic by Nicholas Gurewitch
- Personenbahnhof (Pbf), a type of German rail station
- PTTG1IP (also PTTG1-binding factor), a poorly characterised protein that in humans is encoded by the PTTG1IP gene
- United Nations Peacebuilding Fund, a multi-year standing trust fund for post-conflict peacebuilding
- Protocol Buffer Binary Format (PBF), a binary file format used to store structured data
