= Pakistan Taekwondo Federation =

Pakistani sports governing body

- Sport: Taekwondo
- Jurisdiction: Pakistan
- Abbreviation: PTF
- Founded: 1977
- Affiliation: World Taekwondo
- Affiliation date: 1977
- Regional affiliation: Asian Taekwondo Union
- Affiliation date: 1978
- Headquarters: Rawalpindi
- President: Lt. Col (R) Waseem Ahmed
- Secretary: Murtaza Hassan Bangash

Official website
- pakistantaekwondo.com
- (Pakistan)

The Pakistan Taekwondo Federation (PTF) is the national governing body to develop and promote the sport of Taekwondo in the Pakistan. The federation is headquartered in Rawalpindi.

== History ==
Taekwondo was introduced in Pakistan by Korean Consulate in Karachi in 1962. The federation was established in 1977 and granted affiliation by World Taekwondo. In 1982, the federation was affiliated with the Pakistan Olympic Association (POA) and Pakistan Sports Board (PSB).

== Affiliations ==
The federation is affiliated with:

- World Taekwondo
- Asian Taekwondo Union
- Pakistan Olympic Association
- Pakistan Sports Board

== National Championship ==
Taekwondo is regular part of biannual National Games. The federation organize annual National Taekwondo Championship.

== Associated Bodies ==
The following bodies are affiliated with the federation:

=== Provincial ===
- AJK Taekwondo Association
- Sindh Taekwondo Association
- Gilgit-Baltistan Taekwondo Association
- Baluchistan Taekwondo Association
- Punjab Taekwondo Association
- KPK Taekwondo Association
- Islamabad Taekwondo Association

=== Departmental ===
- Higher Education Commission
- Pakistan Police
- Pakistan Railways
- Pakistan Navy
- Pakistan Army
- Pakistan Air Force
- Pakistan WAPDA
