= Chinese Taipei Canoe Association =

- Abbreviation: CTCA
- Formation: 1991
- Type: Canoeing
- Chairman: Chen, Ming-Hsiung
- Affiliations: International Canoe Federation; Asian Canoe Confederation; Republic of China Sports Federation
- Website: www.taiwancanoe.com.tw

The Chinese Taipei Canoe Association (CTCA; traditional Chinese: 中華民國輕艇協會; simplified Chinese: 中华台北轻艇协会) is the non-governmental organization representing the sport of Canoeing in the ROC Taiwan, also known as Chinese Taipei (Note: According to Agreement between the International Olympic Committee, Lausanne and the Chinese Taipei Olympic Committee, Taipei.).

== History ==
Chinese Taipei Canoe Association was established in 1991, and is a current member of both the International Canoe Federation and Asian Canoe Confederation.

== Leadership ==
Chairman
Chen, Ming-Hsiung (Chinese: 陳明雄)
Vice chairman
Chiang, Chih-ming (Chinese: 江志銘)
Peng, Chun-hao (Chinese: 彭俊豪)
Yang, Ming-en (Chinese: 楊明恩)
Lin, Wan-ju (Chinese: 林婉如)

== Event hosted ==
- Asian Canoeing Championships (2003, 2013; all held in Nantou County)

== See also ==
- Chinese Taipei at the Olympics
