= Pakistan Weightlifting Federation =

Pakistani sports governing body

- Pakistan Weightlifting Federation
- Sport: Olympic weightlifting
- Jurisdiction: National
- Abbreviation: PWLF
- Founded: 1947
- Affiliation: International Weightlifting Federation
- Affiliation date: 1948
- Regional affiliation: Asian Weightlifting Federation
- Headquarters: Lahore
- President: Jabran Bin Salman
- Chairperson: Ms. Nuzhat Jabeen
- Secretary: Ms. Sidra Gul

Official website
- pwlf.net
- (Pakistan)

The Pakistan Weightlifting Federation (PWLF) is the national governing body to develop and promote the sport of Weightlifting in the Pakistan. The foundation was formed in 1947 and is headquartered in Lahore.

== Affiliations ==
The foundation is affiliated with:

- International Weightlifting Federation
- Asian Weightlifting Federation
- Pakistan Sports Board
- Pakistan Olympic Association

== National Championship ==
Weightlifting is regular part of biannual National Games. The federation organize annual National Weightlifting Championship.

== Affiliated Bodies ==
=== Provincial ===
- Punjab weightlifting association
- Sindh weightlifting association
- Khyber Pakhtunkhwa weightlifting association
- Balochistan weightlifting association
- Islamabad
- Azad Kashmir

=== Departmental ===
- Pakistan Army
- Pakistan WAPDA
- Pakistan Railways
- Higher education Commission (HEC)

=== Other ===
- National Women Weightlifting Commission
- Pakistan Weightlifting Coaches Commission
- Pakistan Weightlifting Referee Commission
