= Pakistan Rugby Union =

Governing body for rugby union in Pakistan

- پاکستان رگبی یونین
- Sport: Rugby union
- Jurisdiction: National
- Membership: 12
- Abbreviation: PRU
- Founded: 2000
- Affiliation: World Rugby
- Affiliation date: 2003 (associate); 2008 (full)
- Regional affiliation: Asian Rugby Football Union
- Affiliation date: 2000
- Headquarters: Servis House, 2 Main Gulberg, Lahore 54662, Pakistan
- President: Rizwan Ur Rab Malik
- Chairman: Arif Saeed
- Vice president(s): M. Muzammil Wazeeri; Mohsin Iqbal Khan; M. Naeem Javed; Tahira Saleem
- Secretary: Salman Muzaffar Shaikh

Official website
- pakistanrugby.com
- (Pakistan)

The Pakistan Rugby Union (PRU) is the rugby union governing body in Pakistan. It is in charge of the Pakistan national team. Also among the Union's chief activities are conferences, organising international matches, and educating and training players and officials.

It was formally established in 2000 and gained membership of the Asian Rugby Football Union in 2000. In 2003, it became a member of International Rugby Board. Currently, it is a full member of World Rugby, Asia Rugby, Pakistan Olympic Association, and is recognized by the Pakistan Sports Board as the governing body of the sport in the country .

Arif Saeed, Rizwan ur Rab Malik and Salman Muzaffar Shaikh are, respectively, the current chairman, president, and secretary-general of the Union, having been elected on 27 February 2025.

== History ==
The origins of rugby union in Pakistan can be traced back to the Karachi Football Rugby Union (KFRU), which was founded in 1925. It was active on the All-India circuit up till the late 1950s. A few local players joined the club in 1968–1969. However, the sport saw a decline by the mid-1970s, as the Royal Navy reduced its presence in the Indian Ocean which caused a decline in its visits to the Pakistani ports. By the early-1980s, the sport had almost died out. KFRU continued playing, but found itself unable to travel abroad for matches dues to lack of funding. There was also a dearth of local teams who were available to play against.

Things took a turn in the 1990s, when local players, who were introduced to the sport in the 1970s, founded clubs in Lahore and Karachi. Moreover, staff from foreign embassies, high commissions, and banks established the Islamabad Rugby Football Club in 1992. Regular matches between these clubs followed soon afterwards.

This led to the formation of the Pakistan Rugby Union in 2000 to further promote the game on a national level. In 2003, Pakistan fielded a national team for the first time, participating in the Provincial Tournament in Sri Lanka. It played the India national team there as well. The Pakistan Rugby Union then became an associate member of the International Rugby Board (later renamed to World Rugby) in November 2003. It received its full membership in 2008.

== Activities ==
Rugby has now been introduced at the provincial and district level by the Pakistan Rugby Union. Schools have also been targeted for rugby to be introduced at the grassroots level. PRU is also an active part of the World Rugby’s “Get into Rugby” programme, which aims to increase the participation in the sport. PRU has competed in a number of events organised by Asia Rugby, and has arranged several domestic competitions at both senior and age grade level for men and women. Regularly training and development courses are also arranged to meet the growing demand for training professionals.

Rugby is also one of the events in the National Games of Pakistan - a move that has reportedly resulted in the employment of over 200 players by universities and departments.

== Affiliations ==
- World Rugby
- Asia Rugby
- Pakistan Olympic Association
- Pakistan Sports Board

== Affiliated associations ==
=== The four provinces ===
- Balochistan Rugby Association
- Khyber Pakhtunkhwa Rugby Association
- Punjab Rugby Association
- Sindh Rugby Association

=== The two territories ===
- FATA Rugby Association
- Islamabad Rugby Association

=== National departments ===
- Higher Education Commission (HEC)
- Pakistan Army
- Pakistan Navy
- Pakistan Police
- Pakistan Railways
- Water and Power Development Authority (WAPDA)

== See also ==
- Rugby union in Pakistan
- Pakistan national rugby union team
- Sports in Pakistan
