= Pakistan Judo Federation =

Judo federation

- Sport: Judo
- Abbreviation: PJF
- Founded: 1988
- Affiliation: International Judo Federation
- Regional affiliation: Judo Union of Asia
- Affiliation date: 2000
- Headquarters: Peshawar
- President: Col Junaid Alam TI(M)
- Secretary: Masood Ahmad (03009597835, 0915275627)

Official website
- pakjudofed.org
- (Pakistan)

The Pakistan Judo Federation (PJF) is the governing body to develop and promote the game of Judo in the Pakistan. The federation is based in Peshawar.

In the beginning, Judo and Karate games were being played together under the supervision of Pakistan Judo Karate Board. In 1988, Judo was separated from Karate and a separate body for Judo was established as Pakistan Judo Federation, and Pakistan Karate Federation overtook responsibilities of Karate.

== Affiliations ==
The federation is member of International Judo Federation and Judo Union of Asia (JUA). It is also member of Pakistan Sports Board and Pakistan Olympic Association.
