= Pakistan Archery Federation =

Sports governing body in Pakistan

- پاکستان آرچری فیڈریشن
- Sport: Archery
- Jurisdiction: National
- Membership: 8
- Abbreviation: PAF
- Founded: 1996
- Affiliation: World Archery
- Affiliation date: 2005
- Regional affiliation: World Archery Asia
- Headquarters: Pakistan Olympic House, 2 Hameed Nizami (Old Temple) Road, Lahore 54000, Pakistan
- President: Syed Arif Hasan
- Secretary: Zulfiqar Ali Butt
- (Pakistan)

The Pakistan Archery Federation is the governing body to develop and promote the game of archery in Pakistan. It is based in Lahore, Pakistan, and was founded in 1996. It was admitted into the World Archery in 2005.

== Affiliations ==
The federation is affiliated with:

- World Archery
- World Archery Asia
- Pakistan Sports Board
- Pakistan Olympic Association

== Affiliated associations ==
The following associations are associated with PAF:

- Balochistan Archery Association
- Khyber Pakhtunkhwa Archery Association
- Punjab Archery Association
- Sindh Archery Association
- Army Sports Directorate
- Police Sports Board
- Railway Sports Board
- WAPDA Sports Board

== Championships ==
Pakistan Archery Federation organizes National Archery Championship annually. The most recent edition was the 8th National Archery Championship held in Quetta in November 2021. Archery competitions are also a regular part of the National Games.
