= Lal Saeed =

Pakistani former boxer

- Born: Nowshera, Khyber Pakhtunkhwa, Pakistan
- Occupations: Boxer, Fruit-vendor
- Known for: Wins Hilali Cup, 1971; Part of 1970 Asian Games
- Awards: Pride of Performance by the President of Pakistan in 2010

Lal Saeed is a former Pakistani professional boxer, physical trainer for the Pakistan Navy and the Pakistan Boxing Federation coach appointed by the federation during his professional boxing career.

In 1971, he represented Pakistan and won Hilali Cup, one of the 1970s biggest cup in Asia. From 1971 to 1976, he represented the Pakistan Navy in the Inter-services Championship, leading the navy to win the Quaid-e-Azam International Boxing Championship. He was also a part of 1970 Asian Games.

== Awards ==
The recipient of a gold medal in 1969 and the Pride of Performance award in 2010, he was also given 'an award of outstanding performance' by the chief of naval staff in 1974.

== Biography ==
He was born in Nowshera, Khyber Pakhtunkhwa. He started his boxing career around 1969 and was trained by a Pakistani boxing coach Yaqoob Kamrani and an American coach Tom John. He participated in various uncertain national and international tournaments, including the Hilali Cup in Sri Lanka.

After the government allegedly undermined sports and sports personalities in the country, he later left participating in sports and started working as a fruit vendor in Peshawar.
