= Rugby in Pakistan =

Rugby in Pakistan may refer to:

- Rugby union in Pakistan
- Rugby league in Pakistan
