= Pakistan Canoe and Kayak Federation =

National governing body for canoeing and kayaking in Pakistan

- فیڈریشن کینو و کایاک پاکستان
- Sport: Canoeing and kayaking
- Jurisdiction: National
- Membership: 18
- Abbreviation: PCKF
- Founded: 23 March 2009; 17 years ago
- Affiliation: International Canoe Federation
- Regional affiliation: Asian Canoe Confederation
- Headquarters: Hayat Durrani Water Sports Academy, Hanna Lake, Quetta, Balochistan, Pakistan
- President: Malik Abdul Rahim Baabai
- Vice president: Engr. Naseebullah Khan Sadozai
- Secretary: Hayatullah Khan Durrani

Official website
- www.pcakf.com
- (Pakistan)

The Pakistan Canoe and Kayak Federation (PCKF) (Urdu: فیڈریشن کینو و کایاک پاکستان) is the official national governing body for canoeing and kayaking Olympic sports in Pakistan. Its function is to promote sporting activities and events for canoe and kayak paddlers across the country on a national and international level. PCKF is a non-profit organisation, which represents all people and organisations with a genuine interest in canoeing, kayaking and associated sports, helping them to increase the profile of these sports across Pakistan.

It was formed on 23 March 2009. Malik Abdul Rahim Babi is the current president.

== Headquarters ==
The headquarters of PCKF is based in Hayat Durrani Water Sports Academy (HDWSA) at Hanna Lake, Quetta, Balochistan, from where it carries out administration for all canoeing and kayaking across the country.

== Affiliations ==
On the international level, PCKF is affiliated with the International Canoe Federation. Within Asia, it is affiliated with the Asian Canoe Confederation (ACC). It has been recognised on a national level by the Federal Ministry of Sports as a member of the Pakistan Sports Board, as well as the Balochistan Sports Board (part of the Government of Balochistan) through its constituent unit BCA. In addition, it is affiliated with the Balochistan Olympic Association through the Balochistan Canoeing and Kayaking Association.

In the near future, PCKF intends to be affiliated with the Pakistan Olympic Association (POA), according to its own constitution as a non-profit sports organization in Pakistan. Mohammad Abubakar Durrani is Pakistan's National Champion in K,1-M 200M since 2007.

Abubakar Durrani and Shoaib Khilji Pakistan National Kayaking Champions

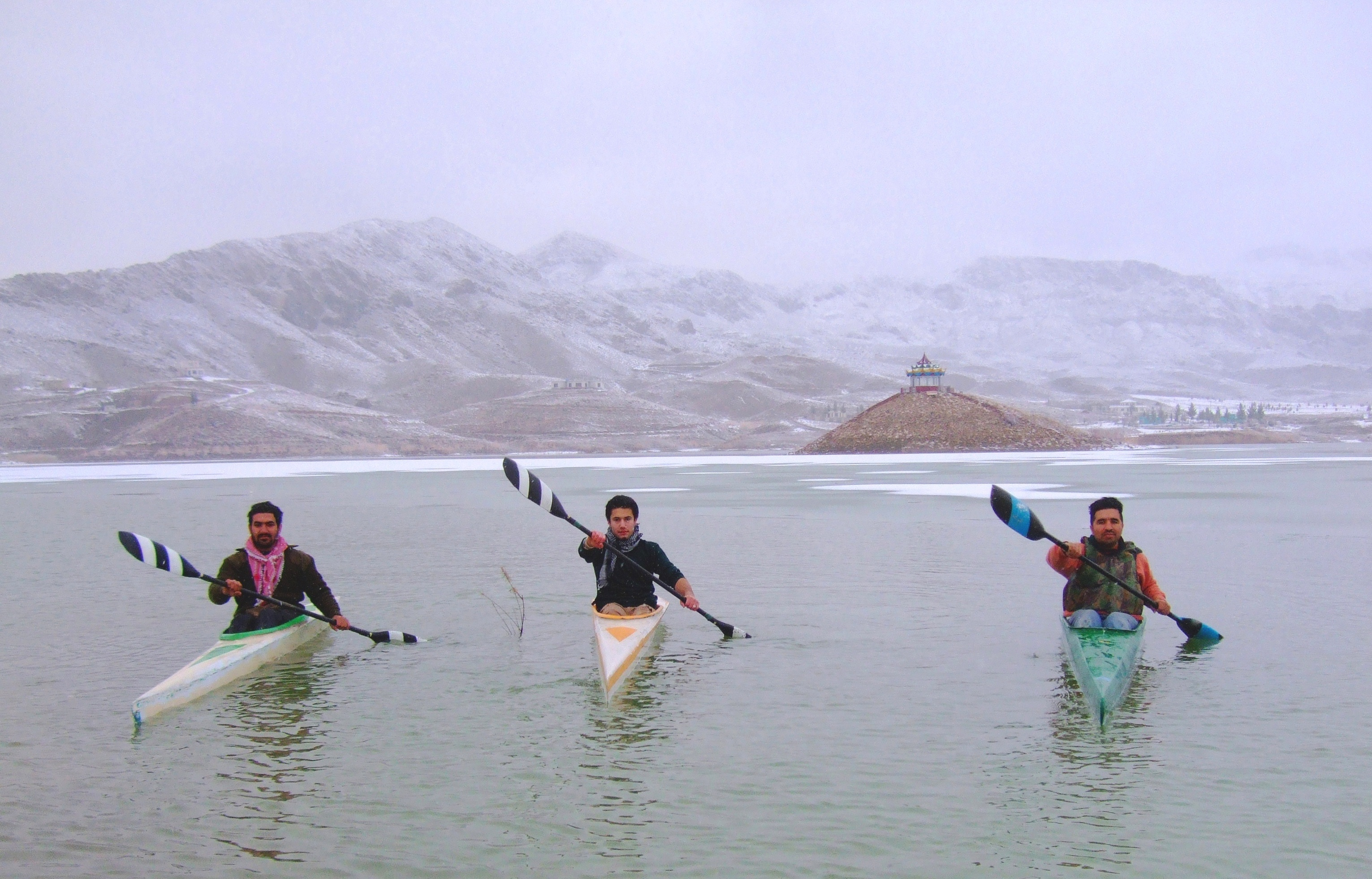
Pakistan National K1 Champion Mohammad Abubakar Durrani with PCKF Kayak paddlers heroes of Pakistan in snow kayak training 2012 (Hanna Lake)

== Affiliated associations ==
The following bodies within Pakistan are affiliated with PCKF:

=== Provinces ===
- Balochistan Canoeing and Kayak Association
- Islamabad Canoe Association
- Khyber Pakhtunkhwa Canoeing Association
- Punjab Amateur Canoeing Association
- Sindh Canoeing Association

=== Institutes ===
- Hayat Durrani Water Sports Academy (HDWSA)
- Pakistan Customs Sports Board Quetta
- I.T University Balochistan
- Balochistan University
- Pearl IT and Degree College Quetta and London
- Girls College Quetta
- Girls College Jinnah Town Quetta
- Pakistan Canoe and Kayak Coaches Association
- Pakistan Canoeing Umpires and Judges Association

=== Departments ===
- Pakistan Railways
- Water & Power Development Authority
- Pakistan Police
- Pakistan Navy
