= Ski Federation of Pakistan =

Pakistani governing body of winter-sports

Winter Sports Federation Pakistan
- Sport: Ski
- Abbreviation: WSFP
- Founded: 1990
- Affiliation: International Ski and Snowboard Federation (FIS)
- Regional affiliation: Asian Ski Federation
- Headquarters: Islamabad
- Location: Air Headquarter, PAF Sports Complex
- President: Air Marshal Zahid Mahmood

Official website
- nocpakistan.org
- (Pakistan)

The Winter Sports Federation of Pakistan is the national governing body for the development and promotion of the sport of skiing in Pakistan. The federation was formed in December 1990.

== Affiliations ==
The federation is affiliated with the Pakistan Olympic Association and is a member of its executive council. It is also a recognized body with the Pakistan Sports Board. Internationally, the federation is affiliated with the International Ski and Snowboard Federation (FIS) and the Asian Ski Federation.

== Affiliated bodies ==
The following bodies are affiliated with federation:

- Punjab Winter Sports Association
- Sindh Winter Sports Association
- KPK Winter Sports Association
- Balochistan Winter Sports Association
- Gilgit Baltistan Winter Association
- Islamabad Winter Association
- Pakistan Army
- Pakistan Navy
- Pakistan Air Force
- Adventure Foundation of Pakistan
- Alpine Club of Pakistan
- Higher Education Commission of Pakistan
- Gilgit Baltistan Scouts
- NADRA
- PTCL
- PTDC
- ABN Ambro
- Citibank
- Roller & Cross Country Ski Club of Pakistan
