= Pakistan Wushu Federation =

Sports governing body in Pakistan

- Sport: Wushu
- Abbreviation: PWF
- Founded: 1962
- Affiliation: International Wushu Federation
- Headquarters: Lahore
- President: Malik Iftikhar Ahmed
- Secretary: Mrs. Ambreen Iftikhar
- (Pakistan)

The Pakistan Wushu Federation is the national governing body to develop and promote the sport of Wushu in the Pakistan. The Federation was formed in 1962.

The Federation is affiliated with the Pakistan Olympic Association and Pakistan Sports Board. The Federation is the member organization of the International Wushu Federation.

== National Championship ==
In addition to a regular event at National Games, The federation organizes National Wushu Championship annually.
