= IRFC =

IRFC may refer to:

- Indian Railway Finance Corporation, an Indian railway financing company
- Islamabad Rugby Football Club, a rugby football club from Islamabad, Pakistan
