= Pakistan Softball Federation =

Pakistani sports governing body

- Sport: Baseball
- Abbreviation: PSB
- Affiliation: International Softball Federation
- Regional affiliation: International Softball Federation
- Location: Quetta
- President: Muhammad Saleem Khan
- Secretary: Haider Khan Lehri

Official website
- pakistansoftball.com
- (Pakistan)

The Softball Federation of Pakistan (SFP) is the governing body to develop and promote the sport of softball in Pakistan. The SFP organizes and conducts national championship annually for men and women's, senior, junior level. The federation also organizes zonal championships and provides technical training at Provincial and District level.

== Affiliations ==
The Federation is affiliated with:

- International Softball Federation
- Softball Confederation of Asia
- Pakistan Olympic Association
- Pakistan Sports Board
