= Karachi Golf Club =

Golf course in Sindh, Pakistan

Coordinates: 24.8872°N 67.1049°E

The Karachi Golf Club, is a golf course situated in Karsaz, Karachi, Sindh, Pakistan. The 27-hole golf course is the oldest golf club in Pakistan.

The course was turfed, landscaped, and filled with greenery, making it one of the largest green areas in Karachi. The Karachi Golf Club was an affiliate of the Sindh Club in 1888 and registered as an independent club in 1891.

The course was relocated to the present site in 1953. In 1991 architect Peter Harradine designed the 18 hole Championship Course. The 18 hole Green Course was created a year later and in 1993 nine more holes were built. The three courses are now referred as the Blue, Yellow and Red Courses.

Golf in Karachi has gained in popularity and the Karachi Golf Club is a favorite pick.

The golf club is where the Pakistan Open is hosted.
