= Pakistan Rowing Federation =

Pakistani governing body of rowing

- Sport: Rowing
- Abbreviation: PRF
- Founded: 1980s
- Affiliation: International Rowing Federation
- Regional affiliation: Asian Rowing Federation
- Headquarters: Islamabad
- Location: Jinnah Stadium, Pakistan Sports Complex
- President: Rizwan ul Haq
- Secretary: Ayaz Ali Khan
- (Pakistan)

The Pakistan Rowing Federation is the governing body to develop and promote the sport of rowing in Pakistan.

The Federation is affiliated with the International Rowing Federation (FISA) and Asian Rowing Federation (ARF). The body also affiliated with Pakistan Olympic Association and Pakistan Sports Board.

== Affiliated Units of PRF ==
Punjab Rowing Association is one of the most active provincial unit of PRF Sind Rowing Association, Balochistan Rowing Association, Khyber pakhton khawa Rowing Association, Islamabad Rowing Association Pakistan Wapda, Pakistan Army, Pakistan Railways, Pakistan Navy and Pakistan Police are the affiliated units of PRF.
