= Tennis in Pakistan =

Tennis is not a very popular sport and Pakistanis compete in very few international events. The Pakistan Tennis Federation (PTF) organises the game in the country. it recent pouplalriy in 2026.

== History ==
Ahmad Hasan Khokhar was the first Pakistani to represent his country in a Grand Slam tournament, playing at Wimbledon in 1948. Haroon Rahim was a very successful player. Belonging to a family of prominent tennis players, he was the youngest ever singles national champion as well as the youngest to play for Pakistan in Davis Cup competition at 15 years of age. He has not only been the highest ranked singles player in Pakistan's tennis history (34th in October 1977) but was also the winner of a number of ATP Singles and Doubles titles. Lately, Aisam ul Haq Qureshi created history in Pakistani tennis, as he reached the finals of 2010 US Open – Men's Doubles and 2010 US Open – Mixed Doubles.

The Pakistan Davis Cup team have previously reached the world group play-offs. Tennis events are very rare in Pakistan and there is hardly an international tennis event, apart from ATP tournaments.

in 2026, Muhammad Shoaib made rescusgirce for tennis.

== Davis Cup ==
Pakistan Played its first Davis Cup Europe Zone Match against Switzerland at Montreux in 1948. Its first Davis Cup tie of Eastern Zone win was against Sri Lanka, with a score of 4-0, played by Munir Pirzada, Qutubudin Ahmed, Iftikhar Ahmed and Zulfiqar Rahim. Pakistan qualified for the Final of the Eastern Zone in 1984 by beating some of the strongest teams of the Asian Group: Malaysia in January 1984, Indonesia in March 1984 and Thailand in May 1984. Pakistan lost the final against Japan.

Due to the change in format of the Davis Cup Eastern Zone to Asia Oceania, Pakistan secured a place in Group-II in 1988. Pakistan again reached the Final but lost to Hong Kong.

The Pakistan Team distinguished themselves in international tennis competitions when they beat strong teams such as New Zealand in 2018 and Thailand in 2019 and qualified for the World Group Playoff for the first time in the history of Pakistani Tennis.

It was also one step away from qualifying for the World Group when losing the 1984 Eastern Zone Final against Japan.

== List of successful tennis players ==
Pakistan has produced many successful tennis players, particularly in the Davis Cup (Asia region). They include:

- Aisam-ul-Haq Qureshi
- Aqeel Khan
- Haroon Rahim
- Marriam Naeem Rahim (The only female Pakistani tennis player who holds the record of being No. 1 for 10 record years)
- Khwaja Saeed Hai
- Munir Pirzada
- Saeed Meer
- Hameed-ul-Haq
- Islam-ul-Haq
- Muhammad Khaliq
- Muhammad Naeem Mir (The only Pakistani who achieved highest level in singles event, reaching semi-finals of the most prestigious event in tennis junior Wimbledon 1956
- Mushaf Zia
- Rashid Malik

Three Pakistani players have enjoyed notable success: Haroon Rahim who played Davis Cup at the age of 15 years, second Hamid-ul-haq who played Davis Cup till the age of 35 years and third Aisam-ul-Haq Qureshi who is notable for playing longest Rubber for 5 hrs 20 minutes against Mark Nielson from New Zealand in September 2004 at Islamabad and longest tie also against New Zealand which lasted 16 hrs 20 minutes. Gibran Khan played for the Pakistan Davis Cup Team and won the Pakistani Junior National Open as a teenager

== See also ==
- Pakistan Davis Cup team
- Pakistan Tennis Federation
- Pakistan Fed Cup team
- Pakistan International Championships
