= Pakistan Tennis Federation =

- پاکستان ٹینس فیڈریشن
- Sport: Tennis
- Jurisdiction: National
- Membership: 15
- Abbreviation: PTF
- Founded: 1947
- Affiliation: World Tennis
- Regional affiliation: Asian Tennis Federation
- Headquarters: Islamabad
- Location: Dilawar Abbas Pakistan Tennis Complex
- President: Aisam-ul-Haq Qureshi
- Secretary: Lt Col Ziauddin Tufail

Official website
- paktenfed.com.pk
- (Pakistan)

Pakistan Tennis Federation (PTF) is the governing body of tennis in Pakistan founded in 1947. It has played a vital role in the development of domestic, national and international tennis in Pakistan, producing a number of young talented players. It also governs teams such as the Pakistan Fed Cup team and the Pakistan Davis Cup team.

Aisam-ul-Haq Qureshi, a renowned Tennis star, is the current president of the Federation, while Lt Col Ziauddin Tufail is the secretary general.

== History ==
In 1947, the All Pakistan Lawn Tennis Association was formed after Pakistan gained independence from the United Kingdom. The Association later changed its name to the Pakistan Tennis Federation.

== International and national affiliations ==
- World Tennis
- Asian Tennis Federation
- Pakistan Sports Board
- Pakistan Olympic Association

== Affiliated bodies ==
The following bodies are affiliated with the Federation:

- Sindh Tennis Association
- Punjab Lawn Tennis Association
- Islamabad Tennis Association
- Balochistan Tennis Association
- Khyber Pakhtunkhwa Tennis Association
- Pakistan Senior Tennis Association
- Higher Education Commission
- Pakistan Air Force
- Pakistan Navy
- Pakistan Army
- WAPDA
- Pakistan International Airlines
- Pakistan Ordnance Factory
- International Club of Pakistan
- Pakistan Railways

== Headquarters ==
The head office is located at the Pakistan Tennis Federation Complex, Garden Avenue, Islamabad. Its construction began during the tenure of former Munir Peerzada, who was the PTF Secretary from 1991 to 1995. He acquired 9.5 acres (76 kanals) of land from the Capital Development Authority on a 99-year lease. It was renamed to Dilawar Abbas Pakistan Tennis Complex, after the former two-time PTF President, in 2009.

== See also ==
- Tennis in Pakistan
- Pakistan Davis Cup team
- Pakistan Fed Cup team
