= Pakistan Sailing Federation =

Governing body of the sport of sailing in Pakistan

- پاکستان سیلنگ فیڈریشن
- Sport: Sailing
- Jurisdiction: National
- Membership: 9
- Abbreviation: PSAF
- Founded: 1969
- Affiliation: International Sailing Federation
- Regional affiliation: Asian Sailing Federation
- Headquarters: National Sailing Centre
- Location: Street #19, Block-6, Boat Basin, Clifton, Karachi
- President: Vice Admiral Faisal Abbassi SI(M)
- Secretary: Lt Commander Abdur Rehman Rao
- (Pakistan)

The Pakistan Sailing Federation is the national governing body of the sport of sailing in Pakistan. Affiliated with World Sailing and the Asian Sailing Federation, it has its headquarters at the National Sailing Centre in Clifton, Karachi.

== History ==
Sailing in the Indian subcontinent has been in practice since 1932. The first sailing club, known as the Royal Karachi Yacht Club, was formed at Bunker Island, Manora, Karachi. RKYC was under the control of the British and expatriates since 1947.

After Independence, sailing activities were undertaken by the Karachi Yacht Club. In 1969, the Pakistan Yachting Association (PYA) was formed by Rear Admiral M A K Lodhi, Captain Z U Chaudhry, and Rody Hermes of Karachi Yacht Club.

The name of PYA was changed to Pakistan Sailing Federation in 1996.

== Affiliations ==
The PSAF is affiliated with:

- World Sailing
- Asian Sailing Federation
- Pakistan Sports Board
- Pakistan Olympic Association

== Affiliated organisations ==
- Sindh Sailing Association
- Balochistan Sailing / Yachting Association
- Punjab Sailing Association
- Islamabad Sailing Association
- Khyber Pakhtunkhwa Sailing Association
- Pakistan Army
- Pakistan Navy
- Pakistan Railways
- Pakistan Police
