= Pakistan Bodybuilding Federation =

Pakistani sports governing body

Pakistan Bodybuilding and Fitness Federation
- پاکستان باڈی بلڈنگ اینڈ فٹنس فیڈریشن
- Sport: Bodybuilding
- Jurisdiction: International
- Abbreviation: PBBF
- Affiliation: International Fitness and Bodybuilding Federation
- Regional affiliation: Pakistan Olympic Association
- Headquarters: Peshawar
- Location: Peshawar
- President: Tariq Pervez
- (Pakistan)

The Pakistan Bodybuilding and Fitness Federation (PBBF) is the governing body of bodybuilding and physical fitness in Pakistan. It is a member of the International Fitness and Bodybuilding Federation. It organises Pakistani championships for each sport branch, and selects national teams for international competitions.

== History ==
The PBBF organized its first event, titled Mr. Lahore (later renamed to Mr. Punjab) in 1952. Another competition, Mr. Pakistan, was held in Lahore in the same year. December of 1953 saw bodybuilders from various cities including Dhaka, Karachi, Lahore, Quetta, Rawalpindi, and Sialkot compete in the second edition of Mr. Pakistan, with Miss Joan Hunt and Miss Great Britain 1952 acting as judges. The third and fourth iterations of the competition were also held in Lahore.

Another event, Junior Mr. Pakistan, was introduced in 1956.

== Affiliations ==
The Federation is affiliated with:

- International Federation of BodyBuilding and Fitness
- Asian Federation of Bodybuilding & Fitness
- Pakistan Olympic Association
- Pakistan Sports Board
