= Pakistan Karate Federation =

Pakistani sports governing body

- Sport: Karate
- Abbreviation: PKF
- Founded: 1988
- Affiliation: World Karate Federation
- Regional affiliation: Asian Karatedo Federation
- Headquarters: Lahore
- Location: Olympic House
- President: Muhammad Jehangir
- Secretary: Andleeb Sandhu
- (Pakistan)

The Pakistan Karate Federation is the national governing body to develop and promote the sport of karate in Pakistan.

== Affiliations ==
The Federation is affiliated with:

- World Karate Federation
- Asian Karatedo Federation
- Pakistan Olympic Association
- Pakistan Sports Board

== National Championship ==
Karate is the regular event of National Games, the federation also organizes National karate championship.
