= Rugby union in Pakistan =

Pakistani code of rugby football

Rugby union in Pakistan is a minor but growing sport.

== Governing body ==
The Pakistan Rugby Union was formally established in 2000 and gained membership with the Asian Rugby Football Union in 2000. Pakistan Rugby Union then became an associate member of the International Rugby Board (IRB) in November 2003.

Rugby has now been introduced at the provincial and district level by the Pakistan Rugby Union. Schools have also been targeted for rugby to be introduced at the grassroot level.

== History ==
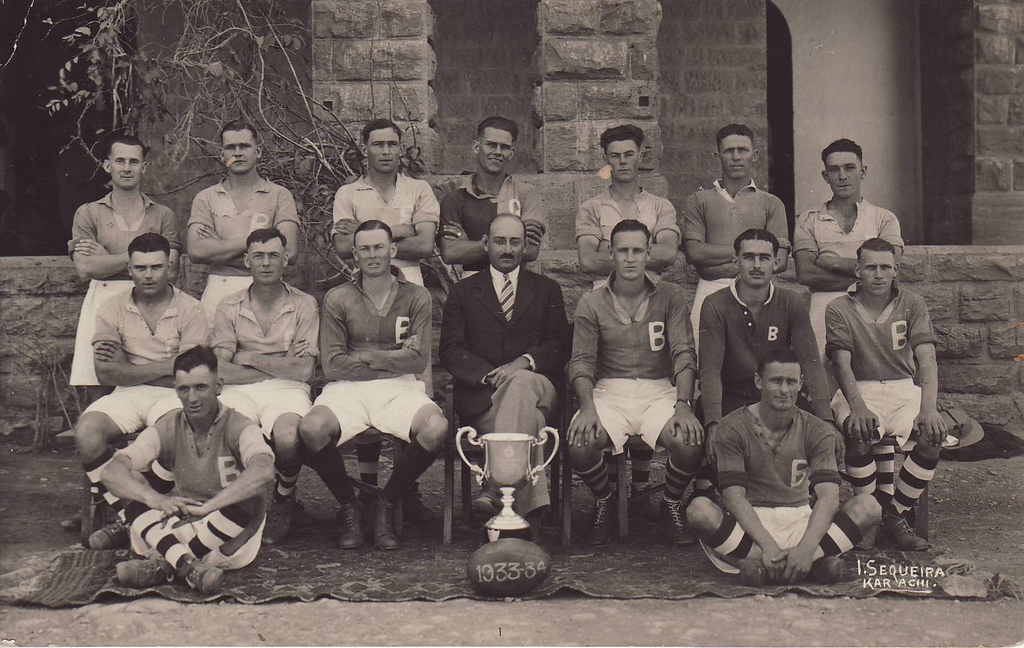
Rugby team in Karachi, 1934

The roots of Pakistani rugby go as far back as 1926 when the Karachi Rugby Football Union was formed.

However, the game had remained mainly an expatriate sport, with KRFU being active on the All-India circuit up till the late 1950s. Records of teams containing Pakistani players exist going back to the 1950s, with an East Pakistan Rifles team beating Chittagong Rugby Club on 2 July 1955 at Niaz Stadium. The Chittagong team was made up of European players, while the Rifles were all Pakistani apart from their coach J.M. Reay. The 1960s saw a decrease in the expatriate population and travel to India becoming more regulated, therefore the club became more reliant on playing fixtures with visiting British Navy Ships, at a time when Karachi had become a regular port of call for R&R and supplies. In 1968–1969 a handful of local players were introduced into the club: this would prove to be the saving grace for the game in the country. By the mid-1970s the British Navy reduced its presence in the Indian Ocean and port visits became infrequent, and by the early 1980s rugby had become almost non-existent. The Karachi Rugby Football Union continued to play, yet due to limited funds it was unable to travel abroad for matches and suffered from lack of opposing teams to play within the country.

The interest in rugby was rejuvenated in the 1990s by the locals who had been introduced to the game in the seventies and by a resurgence in the expatriate presence. Whilst some experienced local players established clubs in Lahore and Karachi, staff from foreign embassies, commissions and banks, consisting of Frenchmen, British, and some Americans, established a club in Islamabad. 1992 onwards has seen regular fixtures between teams from these cities. By the mid-1990s an Islamabad club called the Islamabad Rugby Football Club, consisting mainly of local players, had also been established in addition to the side made up of expatriates; the latter passes through phases of dormancy subject to postings and availability of players. Lahore Rugby Football Club, which was formed around the same time, became their main competitors. The three major clubs in Pakistan. Lahore, Islamabad and Karachi initiated an annual Pakistan 7s Championship on a rotating basis.

== National team ==
The national team is called Pakistan Rugby. It was first fielded in 2003, participating in the Provincial Tournament in Sri Lanka and there played the Indian national side as well. Pakistan currently takes part in the regional divisions of the Asian Five Nations.

== See also ==
- Sports in Pakistan
