= Pakistan Table Tennis Federation =

Pakistani sports governing body

- Sport: Table Tennis
- Abbreviation: PTTF
- Founded: 1951
- Affiliation: International Table Tennis Federation
- Regional affiliation: Asian Table Tennis Union
- Affiliation date: 1975
- Headquarters: Lahore
- President: S. M. Sibtain
- Secretary: Kifayatullah Khan
- (Pakistan)

The Pakistan Table Tennis Federation (PTTF) is the national governing body to develop and promote the sport of Table Tennis in Pakistan. In 1951, Pakistan Table Tennis Federation was formed in Lahore. In the same year, PTTF started its activities for the promotion of Table Tennis in the Country. The first National Table Tennis Championship was held in the Burt Institute, Lahore. The PTTF is the member organization of the International Table Tennis Federation (ITTF).

== Achievements ==
- Won five bronze medals in 10th South Asian Games held in Colombo, Sri Lanka 2006.
- Three badminton players participated in the 13th Asian Table Tennis Championships held from 25 to 30 July 2007 in Korea.
- PTTF won one Bronze medal (boys under 15) in Indian Junior Open ITTF WJC Tournament held from 11 to 15 September 2007 in Gua, India.
- Won one Bronze medal (team event) in The Fajr International Cadet and Junior Table Tennis Championship held from 17 to 20 December 2007.
- PTTF has hosted the 2008 South Asian Junior Table Tennis Championship in July at Karachi.
- Pakistan table tennis female team won one Bronze medal (team event) in 11th South Asian Games held in Dhaka, Bangladesh 2010.

== Affiliations ==
The federation is affiliated with:

- International Table Tennis Federation
- Asian Table Tennis Union
- Pakistan Sports Board
- Pakistan Olympic Association
