= Laura Akram =

British-Pakistani boxer (born 1986)

Personal information
- Born: Laura Djida Akram; 22 March 1986 (age 40)

Boxing career
- Weight class: Featherweight; Super featherweight
- Stance: Orthodox

Boxing record
- Total fights: 6
- Wins: 6
- Win by KO: 4
- Losses: 0
Medal record
Women's amateur boxing
Representing England
England Boxing Women's Winter Box Cup
| Gold medal – first place | 2019 England | 64 kg |
| Gold medal – first place | 2023 England | U60 kg |
England Boxing National Amateur Championships
| Gold medal – first place | 2025 Derby | 57 kg |
Riga Ladies Boxing Cup
| Gold medal – first place | 2025 Riga | 57 kg |
GB Three Nations Championships
| Silver medal – second place | 2025 Cardiff | 57 kg |
Representing Pakistan
World Boxing Challenge
| Bronze medal – third place | 2025 Ústí nad Labem | 57 kg |

Laura Djida Akram (born 22 March 1986) is a British-Pakistani professional boxer and former amateur boxer. As an amateur, she represented both England and Pakistan in international competition. In 2025, she won the Senior Elite under 57kg title at the England Boxing National Amateur Championships, won a silver medal for England at the GB Three Nations Championships, and won a bronze medal for Pakistan at the World Boxing Challenge, held as part of the Grand Prix Ústí nad Labem. Pakistani media described the result as the country's first world-level medal in elite women's boxing. A historical moment for womens boxing in Pakistan

Akram turned professional in November 2025. In March 2026, she won the vacant Oriental and Pacific Boxing Federation (OPBF) female super-featherweight title. In May 2026, she won the vacant WBC Asia female featherweight title by fifth-round technical knockout over the previously unbeaten Pimlapat Roikaew. In July 2026, she defeated Halima Vunjabei, then the reigning UBO female featherweight world champion. As of September 2026, BoxRec ranks Akram No. 1 among active Pakistani female featherweights.

== Amateur career ==
=== Early competition ===
In Oct 2019 Akram walked in to Repton Boxing Club in London as a complete beginner. Merely 8 weeks in by December 2019, she won the Elite C 64 kg division at the England Boxing Women's Winter Box Cup, defeating Jasmine Poole by split decision and Francescia Passera-Hughes by unanimous decision. Her boxing came to an abrupt end due to COVID-19 Lockdown.

In December 2023, she won the Senior B under-60 kg division at the Women's Winter Box Cup. She stopped Brooke Louise in the semi-final before defeating Joëlle Jongerius by split decision in the final.

=== 2024 international competition ===
Akram represented Pakistan in the women's 60 kg event at the 2024 World Boxing Olympic Qualification Tournament 1 in Busto Arsizio, Italy. She was eliminated by walkover against Switzerland's Anna Julia Jenni.

In November 2024, she competed for Pakistan at the World Boxing Cup Finals in Sheffield, England. Fighting at 60 kg, she lost a 5–0 points decision to South Korea's Oh Yeon-ji in the quarter-finals.

=== 2025 season ===
In February 2025, Akram reached the final of the Golden Girl Championship in Borås, Sweden, in the women's elite 60 kg division. In the quarter-final, she defeated Australia's Eve Bryson 3–2 by split decision. Bryson was the 2024 Australian elite women's lightweight champion and later won a bronze medal in the women's 65 kg event at the 2026 Commonwealth Games. Akram then defeated Sweden's Jenny Lundberg 4–1 in the semi-final before losing 4–1 to Dutch youth world champion Maud van der Toorn in the final.

In March, Akram won the elite 57 kg division at the sixth Riga Ladies Boxing Cup in Riga, Latvia, competing under England. She defeated Finland's Anna Tyni by unanimous 5–0 decision in the final.

On 19 April 2025, Akram won the women's Senior Elite under 57 kg title at the England Boxing National Amateur Championships at Derby Arena. Representing Repton, she defeated Kyra Davies by referee stoppage in the semi-final and Keira Bowden 4–1 in the final.

Her national title earned her selection for England at the 2025 GB Three Nations Championships in Cardiff. Akram won the silver medal in the senior women's under 57kg division, losing the final to Wales's Carmen Lynch by split decision.

=== World Boxing Challenge bronze medal ===
In June 2025, Akram represented Pakistan in the women's 57 kg division at the World Boxing Challenge held as part of the Grand Prix Ústí nad Labem in the Czech Republic. She defeated Palestine's Noura Salman 5–0 in the quarter-final before losing 5–0 to Mongolia's Michidmaa Erdenedalai in the semi-final. The official standings awarded Akram a bronze medal.

The result received national media coverage in Pakistan. Dawn and The Express Tribune reported that Akram had secured Pakistan's first world-level medal in elite women's boxing, while Dawn described her as the first female elite boxer representing Pakistan to medal at the World Boxing Challenge.

Later in 2025, Akram represented Pakistan in the women's 57 kg event at the 2025 Islamic Solidarity Games. She lost 5–0 to Uzbekistan's Khumorabonu Mamajonova in the quarter-finals and was classified fifth.

== Professional career ==
=== Professional debut ===
Akram made her professional debut on a Muhammad Waseem & Roy Jones Jr. show on the 29th of November 2025 in Lahore, Pakistan, against Komal Ikhlaq. She won by technical knockout 46 seconds into the third round. She recorded a second stoppage victory on 29 January 2026, defeating Thailand's Somwang Sawinchai in the second round in Bangkok. On 18 February, Akram defeated Ikhlaq for a second time, winning a six-round unanimous decision in Islamabad.

=== OPBF Super-Featherweight title ===
On 12 March 2026, Akram fought Jittamat Phomta of Thailand for the vacant OPBF female super-featherweight title at World Siam Stadium in Bangkok. Akram won by technical knockout at 1:34 of the third round. The OPBF subsequently listed Akram as its female super-featherweight champion, with 12 March 2026 recorded as the date she won the title.

=== WBC Asia featherweight title ===
On 2 May 2026, Akram moved down to featherweight to face previously unbeaten Thai boxer Pimlapat Roikaew for the vacant WBC Asia female featherweight title in Bangkok. Akram stopped Roikaew at 1:35 of the fifth round. After four completed rounds, the judges had Akram ahead 40–36, 40–36 and 39–37. WBC Asia lists Akram as the female featherweight champion with 2 May 2026 as the date she won the title.

=== Akram vs. Vunjabei ===
On 5 July 2026, Akram faced Tanzania's Halima Vunjabei in a non-title featherweight bout in Khanewal, Pakistan. Vunjabei had won the vacant UBO female featherweight world title in March 2026 and had previously challenged Anne-Sophie Da Costa for the WBF female light-flyweight world title in 2018. Neither Vunjabei's UBO title nor Akram's regional titles were at stake. Akram won by unanimous decision over ten rounds, with all three judges scoring the bout 98–92. The victory moved her professional record to 6–0 with four wins by knockout or technical knockout.

== Titles and honours ==
=== Professional ===
- WBC ASIA
  - Female featherweight champion (2026–present)
- Oriental and Pacific Boxing Federation
  - Female super-featherweight champion (2026–present)

=== Amateur ===
- World Boxing Challenge / Grand Prix Ústí nad Labem
  - Bronze medal, 57 kg (2025), representing Pakistan
- England Boxing National Amateur Championships
  - Champion, under 57 kg (2025), representing Repton
- Riga Ladies Boxing Cup
  - Champion, elite 57 kg (2025), representing England
- GB Three Nations Championships
  - Silver medal, senior under 57 kg (2025), representing England
- Golden Girl Championship
  - Runner-up, elite 60 kg (2025)
- England Boxing Women's Winter Box Cup
  - Senior B under-60 kg champion (2023)
  - Elite C 64 kg champion (2019)

== Professional boxing record ==
| 6 fights | 6 wins | 0 losses |
|---|---|---|
| By knockout | 4 | 0 |
| By decision | 2 | 0 |
| Draws | 0 | |
| No contests | 0 | |

| No. | Result | Record | Opponent | Type | Round, time | Date | Location | Notes |
|---|---|---|---|---|---|---|---|---|
| 6 | Win | 6–0 | Halima Vunjabei | UD | 10 | 5 July 2026 | Khanewal, Pakistan | Vunjabei's EBU female world featherweight title not at stake |
| 5 | Win | 5–0 | Pimlapat Roikaew | TKO | 5, 1:35 | 2 May 2026 | Bangkok, Thailand | Won vacant WBC Asia female featherweight title |
| 4 | Win | 4–0 | Jittamat Phomta | TKO | 3, 1:34 | 12 March 2026 | Bangkok, Thailand | Won vacant OPBF female super-featherweight title |
| 3 | Win | 3–0 | Komal Ikhlaq | UD | 6 | 18 February 2026 | Islamabad, Pakistan | |
| 2 | Win | 2–0 | Somwang Sawinchai | TKO | 2, 1:52 | 29 January 2026 | Bangkok, Thailand | |
| 1 | Win | 1–0 | Komal Ikhlaq | TKO | 3, 0:46 | 29 November 2025 | Lahore, Pakistan | Professional debut |

== See also ==
- List of female boxers
- Pakistan Boxing Federation
