= Asian Sailing Championship =

Asian multi-class sailing regatta

Asian Sailing Championship is a biennial Asian Championship multi-class sailing regatta organised by the Asian Sailing Federation.

== Editions ==
Host cities of the Asian Sailing Championship

Number	Year	City	Country	Dates	Events	Athletes	Nations	Notes
1								
2								
3								
4								
5								
6								
7	1993	Hiroshima	Japan	3–8 October				
8	1995	Singapore	Singapore	21–30 December	4			
9	1999	Karachi	Pakistan	24–30 September	6			
10								
11	2004	Mumbai	India	5–13 January	11			
12	2006	Doha	Qatar	16–25 March	11			
13	2008	Sanur	Indonesia	7–13 October	14			
14	2010	Guangzhou	China	20–29 March	13			
15	2012	Langkawi	Malaysia	16–25 February	14			
16	2014	Inchon	South Korea	1–6 July	14			
17	2016	Abu Dhabi	United Arab Emirates	5–12 March	6			
18	2018	Jakarta	Indonesia	24–30 June	12			
19	2022	Abu Dhabi	United Arab Emirates	26 Feb–6 Mar				
20	2023	Pattaya	Thailand	10–21 Dec				
21	2024	Haikou	China	11–20 Dec				

== Optimist Asian & Oceanian Championships ==
IODA (International Optimist Dinghy Association) Asian & Oceanian Championships

No.	Year	Host city, Country
1	2014 Optimist Asian & Oceanian Championships	Al Jazair Public Beach, Bahrain
2	2015 Optimist Asian & Oceanian Championships	Doha, Qatar
3	2016 Optimist Asian & Oceanian Championships	Trincomalee, Sri Lanka
4	2017 Optimist Asian & Oceanian Championships	Hong Kong, Hong Kong
5	2018 Optimist Asian & Oceanian Championships	Ngwesaung, Malaysia
6	2019 Optimist Asian & Oceanian Championships	Al Musanaah, Oman
7	2021 Optimist Asian & Oceanian Championships	Pattaya, Thailand
8	2022 Optimist Asian & Oceanian Championships	Pattaya, Thailand
9	2023 Optimist Asian & Oceanian Championships	(United Arab Emirates) Abu Dhabi, UAE
10	2024 Optimist Asian & Oceanian Championships	Hong Kong, China
11	2025 Optimist Asian & Oceanian Championships	Al Musanaah, Oman
12	2026 Optimist Asian & Oceanian Championships	Colombo, Sri Lanka

== RS:X Asian Windsurfing Championships ==
No.	Year	Host city, Country
?	2014 RS:X Asian Windsurfing Championships	Singapore, Singapore

== Equipment ==
Event	Class	Gender	Year																	
			I	II	III	IV	V	VI	VII	95	99	X	04	06	08	10	12	14	16	18
One-person dinghies	Europe	M									●									
One-person dinghies	Europe	W									●									
One-person dinghies	Laser	M								●	●		●	●	●	●	●	●	●	●
One-person dinghies	Laser 4.7 (youth)	B												O	●		O	O		O
One-person dinghies	Laser 4.7 (youth)	G												O	●		O	O		O
One-person dinghies	Laser Radial	O											●		●	●	●	●		
One-person dinghies	Laser Radial	W												●	●		●	●	●	●
One-person dinghies	OK	O											●							
One-person dinghies	Optimist (youth)	B											O	O	●	O	O	O		●
One-person dinghies	Optimist (youth)	G											O	O	●	O	O	O		●
Two-person dinghies	29er	O															●	●		
Two-person dinghies	420	M											●	●		●	O	O		
Two-person dinghies	420	W														●	O	O		
Two-person dinghies	470	M								●	●		●	●	O	●	●	●		●
Two-person dinghies	470	W								●			●	●	O	●	●	●		●
Two-person dinghies	49er	M																	●	●
Two-person dinghies	49er FX	W																	●	●
Two-person dinghies	Enterprise	M											●							
Multihulls	Hobie 16	O												●	●	●	●	●		
Boards	Mistral	M(h)								M	M		M	M	●	M	M	M		
Boards	Mistral	M(l)								M	M		M	M	●	M	M	M		
Boards	Mistral	W									●		●	●	●	●				
Boards	Raceboard	O											●							
Boards	RS:X	M													●	●	●	●	●	●
Boards	RS:X	W													●	●	●	●	●	●
Match racing	not defined	O												●		●	●	●		
Team racing	RS:One (youth)	Mx																		●
Total										4	6		11	11	14	13	14	14	6	12

Legend: M – Men; W – Women; Mx – Mixed; O – Open; B – Boys; G – Girls;(h) – heavyweight;(l) – lightweight;
