= Pakistan Open =

UMA Pakistan Open

Tournament information
- Location: Lahore, Pakistan
- Established: 1967
- Courses: Defence Raya Golf and Country Club
- Par: 72
- Length: 7,165 yards (6,552 m)
- Organized by: Pakistan Golf Federation
- Tours: Asian Tour; Asian Development Tour; Asia Golf Circuit
- Format: Stroke play
- Prize fund: US$80,000
- Month played: October

Tournament record score
- Aggregate: 269 Airil Rizman (2007)
- To par: −19 as above

Current champion
- (Pakistan) Muhammad Shabbir

Final champion
- Location in Pakistan

The Pakistan Open is a golf tournament organised by the Pakistan Golf Federation that was first played in 1967. In 1989, it was an included on the Asia Golf Circuit, and in 2006, 2007, and 2018 was part of the Asian Tour.

== History ==
Pakistan has a number of golf courses from pre and post-Independence. As the Asian Tour continued to expand, Pakistan was chosen to host a tournament. In 2006, it was part of the Asian Tour schedule for the first time, on an initial three-year deal, however the 2008 Open was postponed due to security concerns within Pakistan at the time the event was scheduled to go ahead.

Chris Rodgers of England won the inaugural event, and in doing so claiming his maiden Asian Tour title. He finished 15 under par, 4 ahead of Indians Jeev Milkha Singh and Amandeep Johl. In 2007 Malaysia's Airil Rizman claimed his maiden Asian Tour title with a two stroke triumph over Scott Hend of Australia.

In May 2022, it was anticipated that the tournament would return in December 2022 on the Asian Tour as the CNS-Pakistan Open with a record prize fund of US$500,000. However, this never came to fruition.

== Winners ==
Year	Tour (Note: ADT − Asian Development Tour; AGC − Asia Golf Circuit; ASA − Asian Tour.)	Winner	Score	To par	Margin of victory	Runner(s)-up	Venue	Ref.
UMA Pakistan Open
2022		(Pakistan) Muhammad Shabbir (4)	270	−14	4 strokes	(Pakistan) Ahmad Baig	Karachi	
2020–21: No tournament
Raya Pakistan Open
2019	ADT	(South Korea) Tom Kim	271	−17	9 strokes	(Pakistan) Muhammad Shabbir	Defence Raya	
UMA CNS Open
2018	ASA	(Thailand) Tirawat Kaewsiribandit	276	−12	1 stroke	(Thailand) Jakraphan Premsirigorn (Thailand) Namchok Tantipokhakul	Karachi	
Pakistan Open
2010–2017: No tournament
2009		(Pakistan) Muhammad Shabbir (3)	272	−16	9 strokes	(Pakistan) Mohammad Munir	Rawalpindi	
2008: No tournament
2007	ASA	(Malaysia) Airil Rizman	269	−19	2 strokes	(Australia) Scott Hend	Karachi	
2006	ASA	(England) Chris Rodgers	273	−15	4 strokes	(India) Amandeep Johl (India) Jeev Milkha Singh	Karachi	
2005: No tournament
2004		(Pakistan) Nadeem Inayat				(Pakistan) Imdad Hussain	Royal Palm	
2003		(Pakistan) Muhammad Shabbir (2)				(Pakistan) Muhammad Munir	Karachi	
2002 (Dec)		(Pakistan) Muhammad Shabbir				(Pakistan) Muhammad Munir	Karachi	
2002 (Feb)		(Pakistan) Matloob Ahmed				(Pakistan) Shakeel Rehmati	Arabian Sea	
2001		(Pakistan) Taimur Hussain (2)				(Pakistan) Abbas Ali	DHA, Karachi	
2000		(Pakistan) Muhammad Tahir				(Pakistan) Muhammad Shabbir	Lahore Garrison	
1999: No tournament
1998		(Pakistan) Imdad Hussain (3)	275	−13		(Pakistan) Muhammad Tahir	Lahore Garrison	
1997		(Pakistan) Ghulam Nabi (6)				(Pakistan) Muhammad Munir	Karachi	
1996		(Pakistan) Imdad Hussain (2)				(Pakistan) Muhammad Akram	Rawalpindi	
1995		(Pakistan) Taimur Hussain				(Pakistan) Imdad Hussain	Peshawar	
1994		(Pakistan) Abdual Hamid				(Pakistan) Nadeem Inayat	Islamabad	
1993		(Pakistan) Imdad Hussain				(Pakistan) Muhammad Iqbal	Lahore Garrison	
1992: No tournament
1991 (Nov)		(Pakistan) Manzoor Ahmed				(Pakistan) Muhammad Akram	Peshawar	
1991 (May)		(Pakistan) Ghulam Nabi (5)				(Pakistan) Muhammad Ali	Rawalpindi	
1990		(Pakistan) Faisal Qureshi				(Pakistan) Manzoor Ahmed	Karachi	
1989	AGC	(Philippines) Frankie Miñoza	286	−2	1 stroke	(United States) Tray Tyner	Gymkhana	
1988: No tournament
1987		(Pakistan) Ghulam Nabi (4)				(Pakistan) Muhammad Sajid (a)	Rawalpindi	
1986 (Nov)		(Pakistan) Taimur Hassan (a) (3)				(Pakistan) Ghulam Nabi	Islamabad	
1986 (Mar)		(Pakistan) Muhammad Ali				(Pakistan) Angoor Khan	Karachi	
1985		(Pakistan) Gul Muhammad				(Pakistan) Abdual Rashid	Peshawar	
1984		(Pakistan) Ghulam Nabi (3)				(Pakistan) Muhammad Shafique	Rawalpindi	
1983		(Pakistan) Ghulam Nabi (2)				(Pakistan) Manzoor Ahmed	Gymkhana	
1982		(Pakistan) Ghulam Nabi				(Pakistan) Muhammad Shafique	Peshawar	
1981: No tournament
1980		(Pakistan) Abdual Rashid				(Pakistan) Taimur Hassan (a)	Rawalpindi	
1979		(Pakistan) Taimur Hassan (a) (2)				(Pakistan) Muhammad Shafique	Pakistan Railways	
1978		(Pakistan) M. Ejaz Malik (3)				(Pakistan) Taimur Hassan (a)	Rawalpindi	
1977		(Pakistan) M. Ejaz Malik (2)				(Pakistan) M M Hashim Khan (a)	Pakistan Railways	
1976		(Pakistan) Taimur Hassan (a)				(Pakistan) M. Ejaz Malik	Rawalpindi	
1975		(Pakistan) Angoor Khan				(Pakistan) Muhammad Abbas (a)	Karachi	
1974		(Pakistan) Muhammad Shafique				(Pakistan) Aameen Taqi Butt (a)	Peshawar	
1973		(Pakistan) Mahmood Hussain (5)				(Pakistan) Pir Bakhsah	Gymkhana	
1972		(Pakistan) M. Ejaz Malik				(Pakistan) Muhammad Shafique	Pakistan Railways	
1971		(Pakistan) Mahmood Hussain (4)				(Pakistan) Pir Bakhsah	Rawalpindi	
1970		(Pakistan) Mahmood Hussain (3)				(Pakistan) Gul Muhammad	Pakistan Railways	
1969		(Pakistan) Mahmood Hussain (a) (2)				(Pakistan) Muhammad Nazir	Gymkhana	
1968		(Pakistan) Mahmood Hussain (a)				(Pakistan) Taimur Hassan (a)	Rawalpindi	
1967		(Pakistan) Aameen Taqi Butt (a)				(Pakistan) Lal Sadar	Gymkhana	

== See also ==
- Open golf tournament
