= Asian Sailing Federation =

International sports governing body

Asian Sailing Federation (ASAF)
- Formation: 1981
- President: Malav Shroff
- Website: http://www.asiansailing.org

Asian Sailing Federation (ASAF) is the Asia's governing body for the sport of sailing recognised by the Olympic Council of Asia (OCA) and the World Sailing (WS).

== Member associations ==
- BRN
- BRU
- CAM
- CHN
- HKG
- INA
- IND
- IRI
- IRQ
- JOR
- JPN
- KAZ
- KGZ
- KOR
- KSA
- KUW
- LIB
- MAS
- MYA
- OMA
- PAK
- PHI
- PLE
- PRK
- QAT
- SGP
- SRI
- THA
- TLS
- TPE
- UAE
- VIE

== Events ==
- Asian Sailing Championship
- Sailing at the Asian Games
