= Ahmed E. H. Jaffer =

Pakistani politician & businessman

- Born: 9 August 1909; Poona, India
- Died: 1990 (aged 80–81)
- Occupations: Politician and businessman
- Known for: Central Legislative Assembly member

Ahmed Ebrahim Haroon Jaffer was a Pakistani industrialist and politician. He served as a member of the Central Legislative Assembly.

== Early life and education ==
Jaffar was born on 9 August 1909 in Poona. His father Sir Ebrahim Haroon Jaffer was a businessman. He studied at Anglo Urdu Boys' High School and Deccan College.

== Career ==
Jaffar was elected to the Central Legislative Assembly in 1934. At 25, he was the youngest. In 1945, he was elected to the Central Legislative Assembly of India from Bombay. He was one of two representatives of the Muslim community from the Bombay Presidency. He served as the deputy whip of the All India Muslim League in the Central Legislative Assembly.After the Partition of India, Jaffar served as the President of the Pakistan Chamber of Film Industry. From 1948 to 1950, he was the president of Pakistan Olympic Association. Jaffar was a member of the Constituent Assembly of Pakistan. From 1947 to 1955, he served in the Parliament of Pakistan. He also incorporated his family business, founded in 1849 in Pune, in Karachi in 1948.

== Global policy ==
He was one of the signatories of the agreement to convene a convention for drafting a world constitution. As a result, for the first time in human history, a World Constituent Assembly convened to draft and adopt the Constitution for the Federation of Earth.

== Death and legacy ==
Jaffar died in 1990. His memory is preserved by the Ahmed E. H. Jaffer Foundation in Pakistan.
