= Delhi Sher RFC =

Delhi Shers
- Full name: Delhi Sher Rugby Football Club
- Nickname(s): Shers
- Founded: 1996 (as New Delhi RFC)
- Location: New Delhi, India
- Captain(s): Adesh Kumar
- League(s): All India & South Asia Rugby Tournament

Delhi Sher RFC is an Indian rugby club based in New Delhi, India. They currently participate in the All India & South Asia Rugby Tournament.

== History ==
The club was founded under the name New Delhi RFC in 1996 when some players got together in a public park in the city. Later on the name was changed to Delhi Lions RFC before reverting to their current name. In 2012 the club undertook a tour of neighbouring Pakistan, taking part in a sevens tournament in Lahore and two fifteens matches.
