= Lahore Garrison Golf and Country Club =

Country club in Lahore, Punjab, Pakistan

Lahore Garrison Greens is a golf and country club in Lahore, Punjab, Pakistan. It is a 72 par United States Golf Association (USGA) golf course with 18 holes.

== Golf ==
The club was designed to promote golf-related activities. Its 18-hole golf course includes a golf cartridge, driving range, club house, shop, coaching center, championship, and tournaments. The golf club is a partly under the control of Pakistan Army. The club has recognition of the national and international golf Federations.

== Other Activities ==
The Lahore Garrison Greens also provides a swimming facility, gym, jogging track, and two tennis/squash courts to its members. The club also offers coaching for the gym and for all the sports it provides. However, there are annual competitions only for swimming and squash. The club also has a golf facility, a swimming pool, long tennis courts, squash courts, archery ranges, and dining facilities.

== See also ==
- List of sports venues in Lahore
