= Pakistan Badminton Federation =

- پاکستان بیڈمنٹن فیڈریشن
- Sport: Badminton
- Jurisdiction: National
- Abbreviation: PBF
- Founded: 1953
- Affiliation: Badminton World Federation
- Regional affiliation: Badminton Asia
- Headquarters: Lahore
- President: Wajid Ali Chaudry
- Secretary: Raja Azhar Mahmood
- (Pakistan)

The Pakistan Badminton Federation (PBF) is the governing body for the sport of badminton in Pakistan. It was formed in 1953 to promote badminton in country. Nawab Iftikhar Mamdot became the first President and Sultan F. Hussain was the first Secretary General of the Federation.

In April 2011, the Badminton World Federation barred the PBF from participating in its international events due to the existence of two factions within the governing body. BWF was also "concerned about the PBF’s involvement in human trafficking and bogus entries in international events." In 2014, BWF lifted a ban from PBF, and in June 2014, PBF elected the new national badminton body.

Wajid Ali Chaudry is the current President, while Raja Azhar Mahmood is the current secretary of the PBF. The election was held on 4 December 2021 at Olympic House, Hameed Nizami Road, Lahore.

Faisalabad division Inter club champion 2017-18 : Moaz Saleem

== Affiliations ==
The PBF is affiliated with:

- Badminton World Federation
- Badminton Asia
- Pakistan Sports Board
- Pakistan Olympic Association

== Tournaments ==
- Pakistan International
- Pakistan National Badminton Championships
- Pakistan Junior National Badminton Championships
