= Pakistan Ju-Jitsu Federation =

Pakistani sports governing body

- Sport: Ju-jitsu
- Abbreviation: PJJF
- Founded: 1996
- Affiliation: Ju-Jitsu International Federation
- Regional affiliation: Ju-Jitsu Asian Union
- Headquarters: Lahore
- President: Khalil Ahmed Khan
- Secretary: Waqar Ilyas Khan

Official website
- pjjf.org
- (Pakistan)

The Pakistan Ju-Jitsu Federation (PJJF) is the national official governing body to promote and control ju-jitsu sports activities in Pakistan. It is currently headed by Khalil Ahmed Khan, a martial artist having black belt 6 Dan and over 36 years of experience in coaching. The federation was established in 1996. Pakistani athletes have won ju-jitsu medals at the Asian Beach Games, Asian Martial Arts Games, Asian Martial arts and Indoor Games.

== Affiliations ==
The federation is affiliated with:

- Ju-Jitsu Asian Union
- Ju-Jitsu International Federation (JJIF)
- Pakistan Olympic Association
- Asian Belt Wrestling Federation

== Affiliated bodies ==
The federation has the following affiliated bodies:

- Balochistan Ju Jitsu Association
- Khyber Phakhtunkhwa Ju Jitsu Association
- Sindh Ju Jitsu Association
- Punjab Ju Jitsu Association
- Pakistan Police
- Pakistan WAPDA
- Islamabad Ju Jitsu Association
- Pakistan Navy
- Pakistan Army
- Pakistan Air Force
- Higher Education Commission
- Gilgit Baltistan Ju Jitsu Association
- DHA Lahore

== Office holders 2023-27 ==
Office holders of the Pakistan Jujitsu Federation for the term 2023 to 2027 include chairman and founder Khalil Ahmad Khan (6th Dan Coral belt), General Secretary Tariq Ali and executive committee member Dr Haris Ashraf (1st degree Black belt).
