= Syed Arif Hasan =

Pakistani retired general

Lieutenant-General Syed Arif Hasan HI(M)
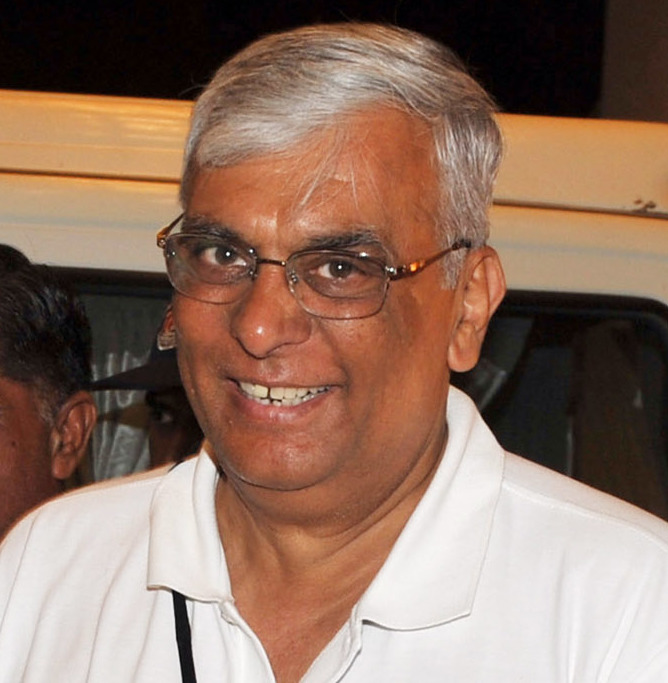

President Pakistan Olympic Association
- In office March 2004 – 1 January 2024
- Preceded by: Syed Wajid Ali

Personal details
- Awards: Hilal-i-Imtiaz (Military)

Military service
- Allegiance: Pakistan
- Branch/service: Pakistan Army
- Rank: Lieutenant General
- Commands: X Corps; I Corps

Syed Arif Hasan (born 11 Nov 1950) is a Pakistani former sports administrator and retired three-star rank general who served as the president of the Pakistan Olympic Association for over 20 years, a time period when the country did not win any medals. He was the chairman of organizing committee of 9th SAF Games Islamabad. Previously, he served as the managing director of Fauji Foundation from 2005 to 2008. He was also elected unopposed as the vice president of the Olympic Council of Asia in 2007.

In 2021, he was asked to step down by Shahbaz Gill the then Special Assistant to Imran Khan but Arif refused to do so.

== Military career ==
As a Major General he served as Vice Chief of General Staff. In October 2001 he was promoted to rank of Lieutenant-General and appointed commander X corps, Rawalpindi. Later in September 2003 he was appointed commander I Corps, Mangla.

== 2004 South Asian Games ==
While still serving in army Arif Hasan was appointed chairman of organizing committee of 9th SAF Games Islamabad. SAF Games were originally scheduled in Islamabad in October 2001 but were postponed over security fears after 9/11. They were then rescheduled for March 2002 but were again postponed due to border tensions between Pakistan and India. In March 2002 Pakistan was forced to cancel the event due to the war in Iraq.

The Games were finally held in 2004.

== Pakistan Olympic Association ==
Gen Arif Hassan was elected President of Pakistan Olympic Association in November 2004. He was re-elected in 2008 and again in 2012 before finally resigning in 2024.

=== Two term limit issue ===
Pakistan Sports Board which comes under government of Pakistan in its 2005 sports policy put a two term limit on office bearers of sports federations. The policy was reaffirmed by Supreme Court of Pakistan in 2011. Gen Arif Hassan refused to accept this decision taking a plea that it violates the Olympic Charter. In 2012 he was re elected to a third term. While government formed a parallel committee, the International Olympic Committee threatened to ban Pakistan. Finally in July 2014 Pakistan Sports board and Government recognized Arif Hasan as president of POA.

== Olympic Council of Asia ==
Gen Arif Hasan was elected unopposed as the Vice President of the Olympic Council of Asia in 2007.

== Archery Federation of Pakistan ==
He was the President of Archery Federation of Pakistan.

Preceded by Syed Wajid Ali	President of the Pakistan Olympic Association; 2004–2024	Succeeded by Capt (R) Syed Muhammad Abid Qadri Gillani
