= Chris Rodgers =

English golfer (born 1976)

Personal information
- Nationality: England
- Born: 5 March 1976 (age 50)

Career
- Sport: Golf
- Turned professional: 2000
- Current tour: Asian Tour
- Former tours: European Tour eGolf Professional Tour
- Professional wins: 3

Number of wins by tour
- Asian Tour: 1
- Other: 2

Best results in major championships
- Masters Tournament: DNP
- PGA Championship: DNP
- U.S. Open: DNP
- The Open Championship: T58: 2014

Christopher S. Rodgers (born 5 March 1976) is an English professional golfer.

== Career ==
In 2000, Rodgers turned professional. He currently plays mainly on the Asian Tour and in 2005 he moved to Bangkok. His first Asian Tour win came at the 2006 Pakistan Open. In 2003 he won twice on the Elite Tour, a developmental tour based in the United Kingdom.

== Professional wins (3) ==
=== Asian Tour wins (1) ===
No.	Date	Tournament	Winning score	Margin of victory	Runners-up
1	22 Jan 2006	Pakistan Open	−15 (69-64-68-72=273)	3 strokes	(India) Amandeep Johl, (India) Jeev Milkha Singh

Asian Tour playoff record (0–1)

No.	Year	Tournament	Opponent	Result
1	2010	Worldwide Holdings Selangor Masters	(Philippines) Angelo Que	Lost to par on first extra hole

=== eGolf Professional Tour wins (1) ===
No.	Date	Tournament	Winning score	Margin of victory	Runner-up
1	9 May 2009	Walnut Creek Championship	−19 (69-63-66-67=265)	2 strokes	(United States) Kyle Reifers

=== Other wins (1) ===
- 2010 Camry Invitational (China)

== Team appearances ==
Amateur

- European Youths' Team Championship (representing England): 1996
