= Azadi Cup =

- Countries: Pakistan
- Champions: Pakistan Army (sevens); Lahore RFC (fifteens)

The Azadi Cup (Urdu: آزادی کپ, romanized: Freedom Cup) in rugby is an annual domestic competition played in Pakistan. It is split into two sections, seven-a-side and fifteen-a-side. In the former, teams compete for the Azadi Rose Petal Cup, while in the latter teams contest the Azadi Servis Cup. The 2011 edition was notable for the first appearance of Afghanistan in international rugby, in the seven-a-side event.
