= Pakistan Modern Pentathlon Federation =

Pakistani sport governing body

- پاکستان ماڈرن پینٹاتھلون فیڈریشن
- Sport: Modern Pentathlon
- Jurisdiction: National
- Abbreviation: PMPF
- Founded: 2014; 12 years ago
- Affiliation: UIPM, POA
- Affiliation date: 2014
- Headquarters: National Hockey Stadium, Ferozepur Road, Lahore
- President: Riaz Fatyana
- Vice president: Mian Sohail Nisar
- Secretary: Zahoor Ahmad
- (Pakistan)

The Pakistan Modern Pentathlon Federation (PMPF) is the governing body for the Olympic sport of modern pentathlon in Pakistan. The Federation was formed in 2014 and has its headquarters in Lahore.

Riaz Fatyana is the President of the federation ever since its inception, having been re-elected in 2019 for a four-year term.

== Affiliations ==
The Pakistan Modern Pentathlon Federation is affiliated with:

- International Modern Pentathlon Union
- Pakistan Olympic Association

== National Championship ==
Pakistan Modern Pentathlon Federation organizes the National Modern Pentathlon Championship annually. The most recent edition, 6th National Modern Pentathlon Championship, was held in Lahore in December 2021, in which 100 players from 8 teams took part.

- Punjab (winner)
- Sindh
- Balochistan
- Khyber Pakhtunkhwa
- Gilgit Baltistan
- Islamabad
- Azad Kashmir
- Pakistan Railways
