= Aameen Taqi Butt =

Pakistani golfer (born 1946)

Aameen Taqi Butt (born 17 July 1946) won the inaugural Pakistan Open (golf) tournament in 1967 as an amateur.
