= Pakistan Mas-Wrestling Federation =

Sports governing bodies in Pakistan

- Purpose: Sports Organization
- Headquarters: Multan, Pakistan
- Chairman: Brig (R) Azam Effendi
- President: Furqan Ahmad Khan
- Affiliations: INTERNATIONAL MAS-WRESTLING FEDERATION
- Website: http://maswrestlingpak.com/

The Pakistan Mas-Wrestling Federation (PMWF) is a national sports organization body of Mas-Wrestling which was formed in 2014. It has head quarter in Multan, Pakistan and it is affiliated with International Mas-Wrestling Federation.

== Formation ==
Pakistan Mas-Wrestling Federation (PMWF) was formed in 2014 in Multan with the aim of promoting Mas-wrestling in Pakistan. PMWF was affiliated with International MAS-Wrestling Federation.

== Annual National Championship ==
Pakistan Mas-Wrestling Federation (PMWF) has been holding its national Mas-Wrestling championship annually since 2016 and it is open to all the nationals of Pakistan.

=== 1st Annual Championship 2016 ===
1st Annual Mas-Wrestling Championship in Pakistan was held in Multan on 17 December 2016. It was titled Open MAS-WRESTLING CHAMPIONSHIP.

=== 2nd Annual Championship 2018 ===
2nd Annual Mas-Wrestling Championship in Pakistan was held in Lahore on 23 December 2018. It was titled 2nd Kyrgyz Ambassador National Mass-Wrestling.

=== 3rd Annual Championship 2019 ===
3nd Annual Mas-Wrestling Championship in Pakistan was held in Gujranwala on 7–8 December 2019. It was titled 3nd Kyrgyz Ambassador National Mass-Wrestling

== International Participation ==
Pakistan Mas-Wrestling Federation has arranged for Pakistani Athletes participation in international events held in Brazil, United States and 32nd World Arnold Classic. Pakistani Athletes have won medals in international competitions in Brazil and United States
