= Pakistan–South Korea relations =

- Pakistan: South Korea

Pakistan–South Korea relations are the bilateral diplomatic relationship between Pakistan and South Korea. Since the 1980s, the relations between the two Asian states have improved and periodically enhanced. Pakistan has an embassy in Seoul, South Korea, and South Korea has an embassy in Islamabad, Pakistan. Pakistan is one of the few countries that have good relations with both North Korea and South Korea.

== Korean language education in Pakistan ==
Korean has emerged as a popular foreign language among young Pakistani students in recent years. The Department of Korean at the National University of Modern Languages (NUML), established in 2006, is regarded as one of the first formal Korean language programs in Pakistan. According to the director of the King Sejong Institute Islamabad, enrollment in Korean-language courses grew from a small initial cohort of three students in 2006 to approximately 180 students per semester in 2018. This increase has been attributed primarily to employment and training opportunities in South Korea, as well as to cultural outreach and language promotion activities conducted by the Embassy of the Republic of Korea in Pakistan.

== Trade links ==
Bilateral trade between the two countries is around US$1.1 billion. Both sides have expressed interest to further promote the trade and investment relationship between the two countries. KOTRA (Korea Trade Centre) is playing vital role in enhancing the trade relation between Korea and Pakistan.

== Immigration ==
In 2005, there were up to 7,000 Pakistanis living in South Korea.

== Bilateral visits ==
In November 2003, Pakistani President Pervez Musharraf paid a three-day official visit to Seoul, South Korea. In spite of Pakistan's friendly relationship with North Korea, Pakistan maintains a strong base in South Korea, with more trade agreements with South Korea and friendly treaty signed by both countries. Recently in 2013, South Korean PM visited Pakistan during his visit many resolutions were signed of cooperation in defense, production and economic cooperation and science and technology with a grant of $10 million to SUPARCO.

== Bilateral agreements and MOUs ==
A significant boost in the bilateral cooperation has been observed in recent years. From tourism to defense, the two countries are expanding their relations. HE Mumtaz Zahra Baloch, the ambassador of Pakistan in ROK, is very keen to connect bilateral R&D sectors. Pakistan have recently joined the Global Green Growth Institute, headquartered in Seoul. A Memorandum of Understanding was signed between Institute of Strategic Studies Islamabad (ISSI) and Institute of Foreign Affairs & National Security (IFANS) Seoul, South Korea. In a recent bid, an agreement on Transfer of Sentenced Persons was signed between Pakistan and the Republic of Korea. In a bid to boost cultural interaction between Korea and Pakistan and responding to Prime Minister of Pakistan's initiative to promote religious tourism, particularly, Buddhist tourism in the country, over 60 members' delegation of Korean Buddhist pilgrims led by Ven. Wonhaeng, President of Jogye Order of Korean Buddhism visited Pakistan. Pakistan and Korea are exploring a plethora of avenues for cooperation in future, especially in Technology, trade, defense and R&D sector.

== Cooperation ==
Pakistani Ambassador to South Korea Nabeel Munir emphasized, during interview with Korean Media, the importance of economic cooperation between Pakistan and South Korea in trade, investment, and science and technology, citing South Korea's low birth rate as an example.

Nabeel Munir said in an interview with The Korea Times at the embassy in Pakistan in 2024:

"The population is declining. Pakistan has another problem. 65 percent of 240 million are young people. They are between the ages of 19 and 35, so the young people are educated and trained, so the Korean economy can take advantage of them."

== Korean companies in Pakistan ==
Federal Minister for Commerce Engineer Khurram Dastgir visited South Korea in July 2015 and discussed bilateral trade and possibility of FTA.

South Korea has agreed to provide a loan of 78 million dollars for the construction of a tunnel in Malakand Pass. Feasibility report of the tunnel has been jointly prepared by National Highway Authority and South Korean consultants.

30 years of Pak-Korea relations

=== Korean companies working in Pakistan ===
- DAEWOO
- KEPCO (Electric).

National Transmission & Despatch Company Limited (NTDCL) and Korea Electric Power Company (KEPCO) have signed a consultancy contract for designing, engineering and construction supervision of 500 Kv Dasu-Islamabad transmission line in Feb-2015.

Sambu Construction Co. Ltd, KEPCO initiated a BOI Mahl Hydro Power Project (500 mW) at Mahl river, District Bagh, AJK in 2005. It was run-of-the-river power generation.

FOUNDATION POWER COMPANY DAHARKI LIMITED (FPCDL) entered into an agreement with KEPCO KPS Plant Services and Engineering Company Limited of South Korea for Operation and Maintenance, Kicked off the Daharki Cogen Power Plant O&M in Feb. 2009.

In 2008, a delegation of the consortium of KEPCO and the DOOSAN of Republic of Korea had come to Islamabad with a very attractive offer to participate in power generation projects, but government response was lukewarm. After three years, Doosan and Kepco, in consortium with other Korean investors, have renewed their offer in a meeting with Prime Minister Yousuf Raza Gilani on 21 January 2011.

Korean M/s Sambu Construction Co. Ltd, Korea Midland Power Company Limited (KOMIPO) and Korea Electric Power Corporation (KEPCO) showed interest to construct Taunsa Barrage Hydropower Project (120 MW) on BOT basis with 100 percent financing of US$300 million in November 2008.

In September 2002, KEPCO showed interest in Rehabilitation, Operation, Maintenance and Management (ROMM)of 150 MW Fluidized Bed Combustion coal-fired power plant Lakhra near Khanote in District Jamshoro, Sindh. No interest from Pakistan government was noticed on it.

During the Sindh chief minister's visit to South Korea in 2011 an MoU to generate 2000 MW of wind energy was signed with Korea Southern Power Company.

- Mira Power

Mira Power Limited is a special purpose company, set up to design, construct, own, operate and maintain 100 MW Gulpur hydro power plant under Government of Pakistan's Policy for Power Generation Projects 2002 as adopted in Azad Jammu & Kashmir. Mira Power Limited is a subsidiary of Korea South East Power Co. Ltd (KOSEP) which is fully owned subsidiary of Korea Electric Power Corporation (KEPCO). Project shareholders are KOSEP (76%), DAELIM (18%), LOTTE (6%).

Gulpur Hydropower Project: On 15 Oct 2015, Mira Power started construction of 102 MW Gulpur Hydropower project at Kotli, Azad and Jammu Kashmir.

Kotli Hydropower Project, Kotli District, Poonch River, AJK. In May, 2015, Asian Development Bank (ADB) said it will provide US$65 Million loan to Mira Power Limited, a South Korean Company, for build and operation. Projected completion was in March 2019.

- Hyundai Motors
- Kia

Kia is the third-largest carmaker in sales in Pakistan.

- Samsung
- LG
- Lotte Group
- Sambu Construction Co. Ltd

Star Hydropower Limited (SHPL) and Sambu Construction Co. Korea initiated a Patring Hydropower Project (150MW) in 2005 at Patrind, AJK. The scope of project was diversion of Kunhar river water (KPK) to fall from height through a tunnel for power generation at AJK side. Its estimated cost was US$360 million with 25% equity and financing from IFC, Korean Exim Bank and IDB.

- POSCO
- CK Solar
- K-Water – K-water (Public Sector Entity) and Sambu Construction Co., South Korea initiated a project in 2008 to construct a water supply line 200 million gallons/day from Tarbella to Islamabad & Rawalpindi with estimated cost of US$800 million.
- Doosan
- KORAIL
- Doekjae
- Shangyong
- Wisdom
- STX
- Deokjae Construction
- Sambo Engineering
- Sambu Engineering & Construction Co., Ltd.
- Korea Construction Institute of Plant (KCIP)
- SM Entertainment Pakistan
- JYP Entertainment Pakistan
- Cube Entertainment Pakistan

=== Korean Companies Looking for Opportunities ===
- Port Investment Co-operation Division
- IL JIN International Co Ltd.
- SEIL Engineering Company.
- GIA Company.
- Madina Trading Co Ltd..
- Korea Ports and Harbours Association.
- KEPCO (Nuclear).

Overall Pakistan has supported a reunification of Korea.

== Software Technology Park in Islamabad ==
An agreement was signed in Islamabad on 21 March 2017, between Ministry of Information Technology and Korea Exim Bank for ten billion rupee loan agreement for Pakistan first state-of-the-art information technology park.

== Role of the PKCC ==
Pak-Korea Culture Collaboration (PKCC) Is a group of Karachi-based young Pakistanis, seeking to enhance the cultural relations of Pakistan and the ROK. The youth have been greatly successful in their mission, collaborating with the Korean consulate in Karachi on several occasions to hold festivals and events. Bringing the two asian nations together culturally and bilaterally.

== See also ==
- Foreign relations of Pakistan
- Foreign relations of South Korea
  - Indo-Pacific Strategy of South Korea
- Pakistanis in South Korea
