= Chaudhry Yaqoob =

Police officer

Chaudhry Yaqoob

Chaudhry Yaqoob is a retired Pakistani police officer and a former Inspector General of Balochistan Police.

Yaqoob joined Pakistan Tehreek-e-Insaf and contested for the National Assembly in the elections of 2014.

Yaqoob is also the current chairman of the Pakistan Volleyball Federation. Yaqoob has stressed the police need a health center in the province to provide better health facilities.
