= Pakistan Fencing Federation =

Pakistani sport governing body

- Sport: Fencing
- Founded: 1999
- Affiliation: FIE POA
- Affiliation date: 1999
- Regional affiliation: Fencing Confederation Of Asia
- Headquarters: Lahore
- Secretary: Usman Ahmed

Official website
- www.fencing.pk
- (Pakistan)

The Pakistan Fencing Federation is the governing body of fencing in Pakistan.The Federation was formed in 1999 with its headquarters in Lahore.

== Affiliations ==
The federation is affiliated with:

- International Fencing Federation (FIE)
- Fencing Confederation of Asia
- Pakistan Olympic Association

== Affiliated bodies ==
The following sports bodies are affiliated with the federation:

=== Provincial ===
- Punjab Fencing Association
- Sindh Fencing Association
- Khyber Fencing Swimming Association
- Balochistan Fencing Association
- Islamabad Fencing Association
- Gilgit Baltistan Fencing Association

=== Departmental ===
- Pakistan Army
- Pakistan Navy
- Pakistan Air Force
- WAPDA Sports Boards
- Higher Education Commission
- Pakistan Railway

=== Other ===
- Pakistan Women Fencing Association
