= Alpine Club of Pakistan =

Governing body of mountaineering & climbing in Pakistan

- الپائن کلب آف پاکستان
- Sport: Mountaineering and climbing
- Jurisdiction: National
- Abbreviation: ACP
- Founded: 1974
- Affiliation: International Mountaineering and Climbing Federation; International Federation of Sport Climbing
- Affiliation date: 1979
- Regional affiliation: Union of Asian Alpine Associations
- Headquarters: Islamabad
- Location: Jinnah Stadium, Pakistan Sports Complex
- President: Major General Irfan Arshad
- Secretary: Karrar Haidri

Official website
- alpineclub.pk
- (Pakistan)

The Alpine Club of Pakistan (ACP) is a non governmental sports organisation for the promotion of mountaineering, climbing and other mountain-related adventure activities in Pakistan. In addition to this, the club serves as the national sports governing body for the sport of mountaineering and climbing in Pakistan.

== History ==
The club was founded in 1974, and has its head office at the Jinnah Sports Stadium in Islamabad. Since 1977, the Club has trained a large number of its members, armed forces personnel, locals, liaisons and ladies in rock and ice climbing, mountaineering, and other mountain tourism related activities at its training institute at Nilt in Gilgit Baltistan.

== Affiliations ==
The club is affiliated with:

- International Mountaineering and Climbing Federation
- International Federation of Sport Climbing
- Union of Asian Alpine Associations
- Pakistan Sports Board

== Presidents ==
No.	Name	Start year	End year	Notes	Ref.
1	Lt Gen Ghulam Jilani Khan	1974	1976	Founding member	
2	Major General (R) Qamar Ali Mirza	1976	1993	Founding member Ex-chairman POF Wah	
3	Lt General (R) Safdar Butt	1993	1994	Founding member Ex-chairman WAPDA	
4	Brig (R) Amir Gulistan Janjua	1994	2004	Ex-governor NWFP and former Ambassador to Nepal, UAE, and Saudi Arabia	
5	Nazir Sabir	2004	2010	First Pakistani mountaineer to summit Mount Everest	
6	Lt Col (R) Manzoor Hussain	2010	2017	Organised and co-led the Pak-Japanese Services Expedition which made the first international ascent of Passu Peak in Hunza in 1978 Served in the Pakistan Army Corps of Engineers and worked on the construction of Karakoram Highway and Skardu Road	
7	Abu Zafar Sadiq	2017	2025		
8	Major General Irfan Arshad HI(M)	2025	present		

== Secretaries ==
No.	Name	Start year	End year
1	Lt General (R) Safdar Butt	1974	1978
2	Brig Imtiaz Azim	1978	1983
	Shabbir Ahmed (assistant secretary)	1978	1995
3	Khadim Hussain	1983	1985
4	Brig Ahsan Yusuf	1986	1987
5	Brig Khalid Majid	1987	1988
6	Brig Mohammad Yousuf	1989	1992
7	Lt Col (R) Manzoor Hussain	1993	2004
8	Saad Tariq Siddiqii	2004	2008
9	Wing Commander (R) Javed Iqbal	2008	2010
5	Abu Zafar Sadiq	2010	2017
6	Karrar Haidri	2018	Present
