= Asian Canoe Confederation =

Continental governing body of the sport of canoeing in Asia

Asian Canoe Confederation (ACC)
- Headquarters: Seoul, South Korea
- President: Prashant Kushwaha

The Asian Canoe Confederation (ACC) is the continental governing body of the sport of canoeing in Asia.

== Leadership ==
The current President of the Asian Canoe Confederation is Prashant Kushwaha, an Indian sports administrator specializing in kayaking and canoeing. In addition to his role at the ACC, Kushwaha serves as the President of the Indian Kayaking & Canoeing Association (IKCA) and is a member of the International Relations and Management Committee of the Indian Olympic Association (IOA).

== Events ==
- Asian Canoeing Championships
- Canoeing at the Asian Games

== See also ==
- International Canoe Federation
