= Pakistan Tug of War Federation =

- Sport: Tug of War
- Abbreviation: PTWF
- Affiliation: Tug of War International Federation
- Headquarters: Lahore
- President: Mohsin Latif
- Secretary: Mohammad Jamil Ahmed Rana
- (Pakistan)

The Pakistan Tug of War Federation is the national governing body to develop and promote the sport of Tug of War in the Pakistan. The federation is based in Lahore. The Federation is the member organization of the Tug of War International Federation (TWIF).
