= Pakistan Boxing Federation =

Governing body of amateur boxing in Pakistan

- پاکستان باکسنگ فیڈریشن
- Sport: Amateur Boxing
- Abbreviation: PBF
- Founded: 1948
- Affiliation: International Boxing Association
- Affiliation date: 1959
- Regional affiliation: Federation of Asian Boxing Confederation (ASBC)
- Headquarters: Brave Gym, Packages Mall, Walton Road, Lahore, Pakistan
- President: Jahangir Ahmed
- Chairman: Abid Jahangir
- Secretary: Sharjil Zia Butt
- (Pakistan)

The Pakistan Boxing Federation (PBF) is the national governing body of amateur boxing in Pakistan. It is responsible for organizing and regulating amateur boxing competitions across the country and for the identification, development, and the selection of boxers to represent Pakistan in international competitions.

== Notable boxers ==
Pakistan has seen success at amateur level boxing, despite lack of necessary equipment and facilities. They have won medals at the Olympic, Asian and the Commonwealth Games. Examples include Quetta-born Haider Ali who won gold at the 2002 Commonwealth Games in the featherweight event, and went on to become a professional boxer. Asghar Ali Shah is a two-time Olympian with 13 gold and 10 silver medals at international level. Hussain Shah won a bronze medal in the middleweight event at the 1988 Summer Olympics, while Muhammad Waseem won bronze and silver medals at the 2010 and 2014 Commonwealth Games. Mehrullah Lassi is best known for winning a gold medals at the 2002 Asian Games, 2005 Asian Championships and a silver medal at the 2006 Commonwealth Games. He represented Pakistan at the 2004 Summer Olympics and served as the country's flag-bearer in the closing ceremony.

In 2017, a body of professional boxing in Pakistan has been formed. It is named the Pakistan Boxing Council PBC is headed by Olympian boxer Abdul Rasheed Baloch who later stepped down as president in 2024, with Zaigham Baloch being announced as the new president. it is the only separate body from the PBF.

Pakistan’s most successful boxer Muhammad Waseem became the first Boxer in South Asia to challenge for a world title, and the first to be ranked in the top 20.

Laura Akram was the 1st ever Female Pakistani boxer to medal at world level a history-making moment for the Federation

Fatima Zahra won a bronze medal at the 2025 Islamic Solidarity Games, becoming the first Pakistani woman to claim an international multi-sport boxing medal. She won another bronze medal at the 2026 Commonwealth Games, becoming Pakistan's first female Commonwealth Games medalist and the first Pakistani woman to win a boxing medal at the Commonwealth Games.

== Affiliation ==
- International Boxing Association
- Asian Boxing Confederation
- Pakistan Olympic Association
- Pakistan Sports Board
