= Pakistan Triathlon Federation =

- Sport: Triathlon
- Abbreviation: PTF
- Affiliation: International Triathlon Union
- Regional affiliation: Asian Triathlon Confederation
- Location: Faisalabad
- President: Asif Amin Sheikh
- Secretary: Amir Imdad Bhatti
- (Pakistan)

The Pakistan Triathlon Federation is the governing body to develop and promote the Triathlon sport in Pakistan. The Federation is based in Faisalabad.

The Federation is affiliated with International Triathlon Union and its continental association Asian Triathlon Confederation.
