= Motorsport Association of Pakistan =

- Sport: Motorsport
- Abbreviation: MAP
- Affiliation: Fédération Internationale de l'Automobile
- Affiliation date: 2007
- Headquarters: Karachi
- Location: Pakistan
- President: Abdul Wahid

Official website
- motorsportpakistan.com.pk
- (Pakistan)

The Motorsport Association of Pakistan (MAP) is the National Sporting Authority (ASN) for the governance of auto racing in Pakistan under the International Sporting Code of the FIA. The Association is a member of the Fédération Internationale de l'Automobile (FIA).

MAP organises different motor sports events in Pakistan, such as Cholistan Desert Jeep Rally, Gwadar Rally, autoshows, Faisalabad drag racing A1 Team Pakistan is also regulated by MAP.
