= Racquetball Association of Pakistan =

The Racquetball Association of Pakistan is national sports governing body to promote and develop sport of racquetball in Pakistan. The association is based in Karachi.

The association is affiliated with the International Racquetball Federation and its continental counterpart, the Asian Racquetball Federation.
