= Pakistan Bridge Federation =

Pakistani sport governing body

- پاکستان برج فیڈریشن
- Sport: Bridge
- Jurisdiction: National
- Abbreviation: PBF
- Founded: 1972; 54 years ago
- Affiliation: World Bridge Federation
- Regional affiliation: Bridge Federation of Asia & the Middle East
- Headquarters: Karachi
- Location: National Stadium
- President: Khurshid Hadi
- Secretary: Tariq Rasheed Khan

Official website
- www.pakistanbridgefederation.com
- (Pakistan)

The Pakistan Bridge Federation is the governing body for the game of bridge in Pakistan. The federation was founded as the Pakistan Bridge Association in 1972. It was renamed to the Pakistan Bridge Federation in 1993. Its headquarters are located in Karachi.

It has a membership of around 500 players.

== History ==
Tournament bridge was introduced in Pakistan in the mid-1970s. At that time, Dr. Muhammad Ilyas shifted from Saudi Arabia to Karachi and started bridge clubs, the first of which was opened at the Bangalore Town Hall near Tipu Sultan Road. However, in 1977, the club had to move after an adjacent mosque accused it of gambling. Eventually, it was able to establish its base underneath one of the stands at the National Stadium.

After the introduction of the game, M. Aslam Sheikh is credited with popularizing it. Young officers of the armed forces played it regularly to improve their mental acuity. Eventually, the civilian population also started playing it, and the game spread. So far, Pakistani players have won 34 medals in international competitions.

== Affiliations ==
The Pakistan Bridge Federation is affiliated with:

- World Bridge Federation
- Bridge Federation of Asia & the Middle East
- Pakistan Sports Board
