= Pakistan Federation of Roller Skating =

The Pakistan Federation of Roller Sports is a national sports governing body to develop and promote the sport of roller skating in Pakistan. The federation, based in Lahore, was founded by Khalid Saeed.

Roller hockey was first introduced in Pakistan nearly 40 years ago by Khalid Saeed, who was the president of the Roller Skating Federation of Pakistan. Saeed died on July 22, 2022, in Lahore. The first national championship organized by PFRS was for Speed Skating & rink hockey (ball and cane) in 1980, hosted by Lahore.

The Pakistan Federation of Roller Skating is the national sports governing body to develop and promote roller hockey in Pakistan. The federation is based in Lahore and is affiliated with the International Federation of Roller Sports and its continental association, the Confederation of Asia Roller Sports.

Pakistan Federation of Roller Hockey has represented Pakistan many times in different countries & different championships as like Olympics, World Games, World Championship, Asian championship, etc.

The federation is affiliated with International Federation of Roller Sports and its continental association Confederation of Asia Roller Sports.
