= Islamabad Rugby Football Club =

Islamabad RFC
- Full name: Islamabad Rugby Football Club
- Nickname(s): Jinns
- Founded: 1992
- Location: Islamabad, Pakistan
- Ground(s): F-10/4 Islamabad (Capacity: 1,000)
- President: (Pakistan) Farid Niazi
- Captain(s): (Pakistan) Shiraz Niazi
- League(s): National Rugby Championship
- 2008: Group stage
1st kit	2nd kit

Islamabad Rugby Football Club also known as the JINNS is a rugby football club from Islamabad, Pakistan. It was founded in 1992 by a group of expatriates, as a registered club. The club enjoyed support among its members both local and expatriate players. In 1996, the local players took over the affairs of the IRFC and worked hard to bring the club to a better and more organized level. The club, however, plays regular matches with the British High Commission and also a mixture of player's from the Australian High Commission, French embassy, and expats working with various companies.

== Membership ==
Today the club has 60 playing members as well 20 social members. A board of governors including president, vice president, secretary, treasure, chief organizer and player coordinator manage the club. IRFC is registered with the clubs/associations in India, Sri Lanka and the UAE.

== Philosophy ==
The guiding philosophy of IRFC is to work as a social group laying emphasis on the physical, psychological and social development of its members. The club gives its members a sense of responsibility, belonging and the most needed a sense of achievement.

== Team name ==
Members for a number of reasons chose JINNS as the team name. It is firstly unique in proprietary terms as well as reflects their own identity and culture heritage. Also Jinns are creatures created from fire and in the local language the name is colloquially used to signify exceptional quality.

== Achievement ==
A recent achievement by IRFC has been a ground of its own in F-10/4 has permanently been allocated to it by the Capital Development Authority. The IRFC ground is one of the most picturesque grounds in Pakistan, ideally situated in the back view of the Margalla Hills with a lush green field and surrounding trees making it even more attractive. The grass on the ground is one of the most well-maintained in Islamabad with 24-hour groundsmen taking care of it day and night. This has given the club a chance to further improve its profile and increase the scope of its achievements.

== Tournaments ==
The team has played various national and international tournaments including Dubai 7s, All Pakistan sevens in Lahore, All India fifteens in Bombay and Tens tournaments in Lahore. IRFC has been holding its own 7's tournament from last 4 years under the name of INSTAPHONE. The team has played well and achieved first-second and third position in almost all the tournaments.
