= National Games of Pakistan =

Multi-sport event in Pakistan

National Games of Pakistan قومی کھیل
- Status: Active
- Genre: Multi-sport event
- Frequency: Biennial
- Location: Various
- Country: Pakistan
- Years active: 1948–present
- Established: 1948; 78 years ago
- Founder: Quaid-e-Azam
- Previous event: 2025
- Participants: 12,000
- Budget: Rs. 697 million (FY 2023–24)
- Organiser: Pakistan Sports Board, Pakistan Olympic Association
- Website: www.sports.gov.pk

The National Games of Pakistan is a multi-sport event held in Pakistan. It comprises various disciplines in which sportsmen from the provinces and departments of Pakistan compete against each other. The games are organized by Pakistan Sports Board, Pakistan Olympic Association, and the host province.

Pakistan Army have dominated the Games throughout their history, having won 29 of the 35 official editions. Lahore has hosted the Games ten times, more than any other city.

== History ==
Before the Independence of Pakistan, the Indian chapter of the Olympic movement was founded in 1924. The founder was Hassan, the first Secretary of the Punjab Olympic Association. Lt. Col. H.L.O. Garrett, vice principal of Government College, Lahore, was the President of the founding body. At the same time, the Indian Olympic Games were organized in Delhi, Calcutta, and Lahore, the then capital of undivided Punjab.

The Games were held every two years from 1924 as Indian Olympic Games and were renamed as National Games when they were first held in Bombay in 1940.

=== Post-independence ===
After the independence of Pakistan, the first National Games were held at Polo Ground, Karachi from 23 to 25 April 1948. The games were organized by Ahmed E.H. Jaffar, the first President of the Pakistan Olympic Association.

Sportsmen and officials from East Pakistan (now Bangladesh) and all the integrated Provincial units of West Pakistan took part in these Games. The total number of athletes was 140. No competitors were, however, invited from any foreign country. Competitions were held in track and field, basketball, boxing, cycling, volleyball, weightlifting, and wrestling. The overall championship was won by the Punjab contingent.

== The Quaid-i-Azam Trophy ==
The inaugural edition of the National Games was opened by the founder and Governor-General of Pakistan, Muhammad Ali Jinnah. He donated a "Challenge Shield" from his private funds. The trophy is now named as the "Quaid-i-Azam Trophy", and is awarded to the winning team in every edition.

== Organization ==
The National Games are required to be held once in two years leaving those years in which the Olympic Games and Asian Games are scheduled to be held, depending upon the situation in country. The Pakistan Olympic Association (POA) can allow relaxation from the general rule only in exceptional cases or natural calamity. The duration and the regulation of the National Games is entirely within the jurisdiction of POA.

The games are jointly organized by the Pakistan Sports Board, the Pakistan Olympic Association, and the provincial government of the host city.

== Editions ==
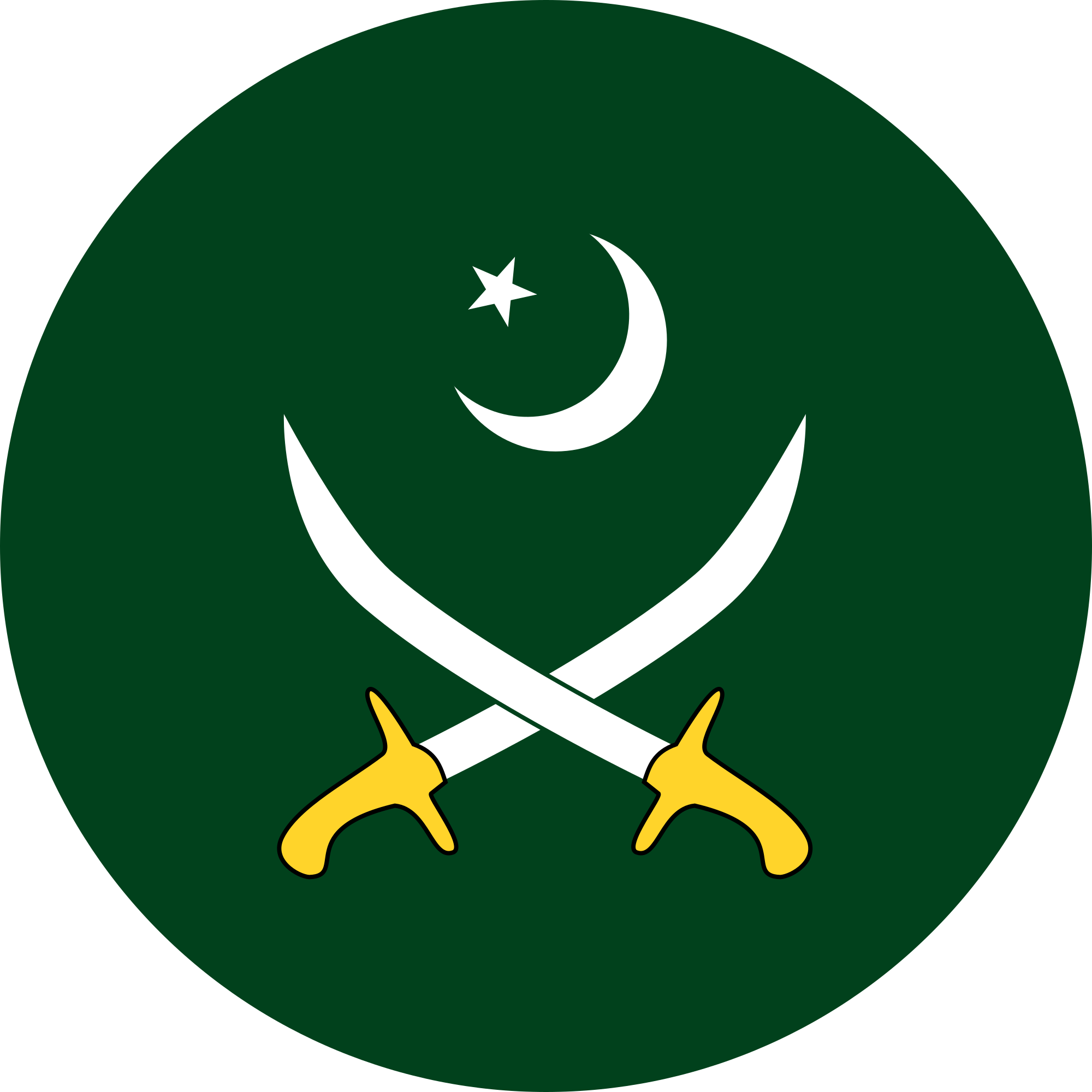
Contingents from Pakistan Army have dominated the Games, having won 29 of the 35 official editions.

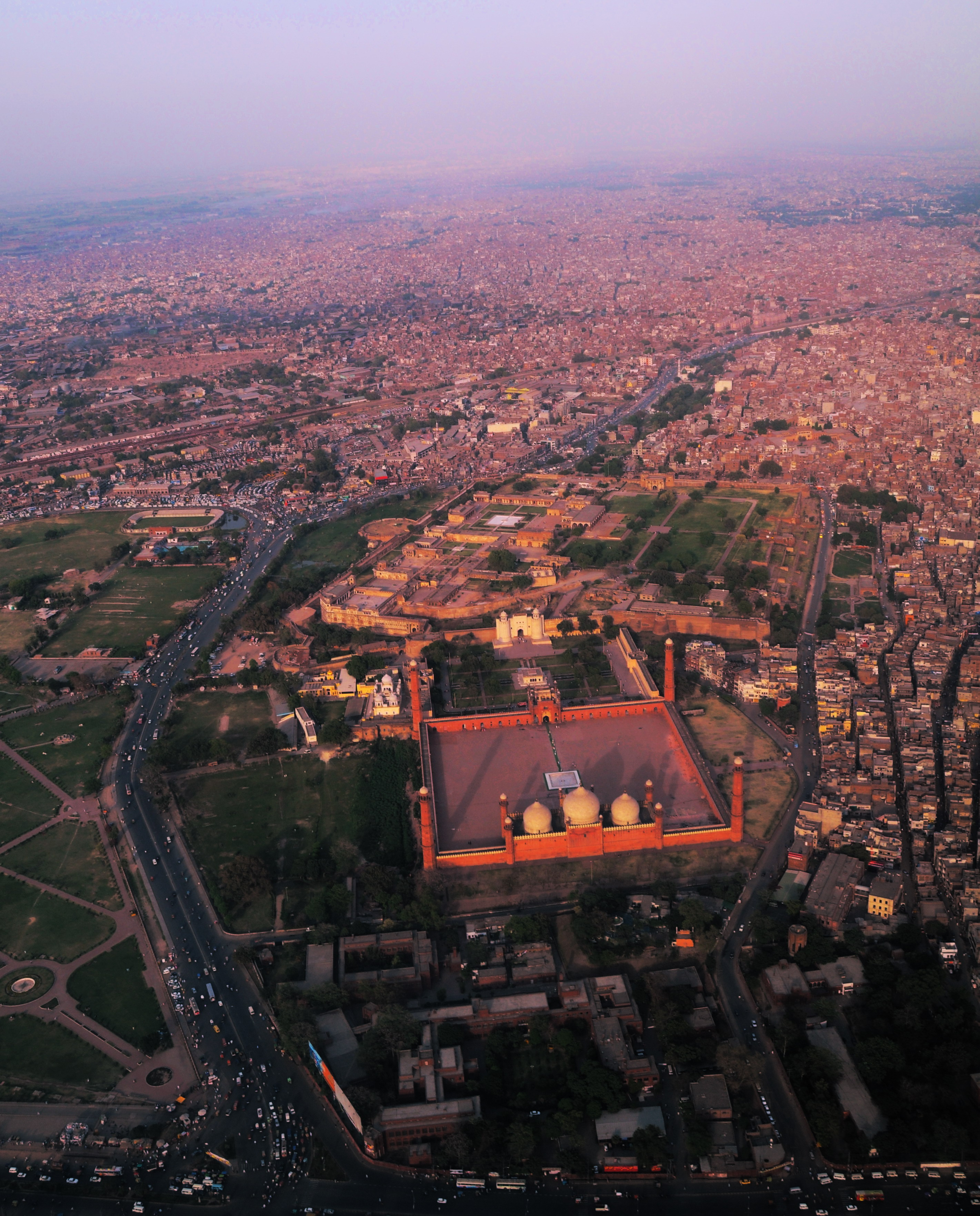
Lahore has hosted the Games ten times, more than any other city.

Venues and winners of the National Games of Pakistan
Number	Year	Venue	Winner
I	1948	Karachi (1)	Punjab
II	1950	Lahore (1)	Services
III	1952	Lahore (2)	Services
IV	1954	Sahiwal (1)	No trophy was awarded
V	1955	Dhaka (1)	Services
VI	1956	Lahore (3)	Pakistan Army
VII	1958	Peshawar (1)	Pakistan Army
VIII	1960	Dhaka (2)	Pakistan Army
IX	1962	Lahore (4)	Pakistan Army
X	1964	Dhaka (3)	Pakistan Army
XI	1966	Lahore (5)	Pakistan Railways
XII	1968	Dhaka (4)	Pakistan Army
XIII	1970	Karachi (2)	Pakistan Army
XIV	1972	Lahore (6)	Pakistan Army
XV	1974	Peshawar (2)	Pakistan Army
XVI	1976	Karachi (3)	Pakistan Army
XVII	1978	Lahore (7)	Pakistan Army
XVIII	1980	Karachi (4)	Pakistan Army
XIX	1982	Peshawar (3)	Pakistan Army
XX	1984	Faisalabad (1)	Pakistan Army
XXI	1986	Quetta (1)	Pakistan Army
XXII	1988	Karachi (5)	Pakistan Army
XXIII	1990	Peshawar (4)	Pakistan Army
XXIV	1992	Lahore (8)	Pakistan Army
XXV	1995	Quetta (2)	Pakistan Army
XXVI	1996	Karachi (6)	Pakistan Army
XXVII	1998	Peshawar (5)	Pakistan Army
XXVIII	2001	Lahore (9)	Pakistan Army
XXIX	2004	Quetta (3)	Pakistan Army
XXX	2007	Karachi (7)	Pakistan Army
XXXI	2010	Peshawar/Islamabad (6)	Pakistan Army
XXXII	2012	Lahore (10)	WAPDA
XXXII	2013	Islamabad (1)	Pakistan Army
XXXIII	2019	Peshawar (7)	Pakistan Army
XXXIV	2023	Quetta (4)	Pakistan Army
XXXV	2025	Karachi (8)	Pakistan Army

== Sports ==
In the 34th edition of the National Games, held in Quetta in 2023, over 6,000 athletes participated in 32 different sports encompassing 57 events.

- Archery (2)
- Athletics (2)
- Badminton (2)
- Baseball (1)
- Basketball (2)
- Bodybuilding (1)
- Boxing (2)
- Cycling (2)
- Fencing (2)
- Field hockey (2)
- Football (2)
- Golf (2)
- Gymnastics (1)
- Handball (2)
- Judo (2)
- Kabaddi (1)
- Karate (2)
- Rowing (2)
- Rugby sevens (2)
- Sailing (2)
- Shooting (2)
- Softball (1)
- Squash (2)
- Swimming (2)
- Taekwondo (2)
- Table tennis (2)
- Tennis (2)
- Tug of war (1)
- Volleyball (2)
- Weightlifting (2)
- Wrestling (1)
- Wushu (2)

Four exhibition events – futsal, canoeing and kayaking, throwball, and women's cricket – were also part of the 2023 edition.

== See also ==
- Quaid-e-Azam Inter Provincial Youth Games
