= Pakistan Sports Board =

Government agency

- Jurisdiction: Pakistan
- Founded: 1962; 64 years ago
- Headquarters: Islamabad, Pakistan
- President: Rana Sanaullah Khan, since 30 May 2024
- Director: Vacant

Official website
- sports.gov.pk
- (Pakistan)

Pakistan Sports Board (Urdu: هیئت ورزشی پاکستان) was established under the Ministry of Education in 1962 as a corporate body to promote and develop uniform standards of competition for sports in Pakistan comparable to the international standards, and regulate sports in Pakistan on a national basis.

Subsequently, in July 1977, with the creation of Ministry of Culture, Sports and Tourism, the administrative control of Pakistan Sports Board was transferred to it.

After the devolution of the Ministry of Sports in June 2011, the administrative control of the Pakistan Sports Board has transferred to Ministry of Inter Provincial Coordination (IPC).

The Board has a General Body with its Headquarters at Islamabad. The General Body consists of 38 members. It lays down the policy, and 12 members Executive Committee implements this policy.

Pakistan Sports Board being the supreme body of sports monitors the activities/affairs of National Sports Federations throughout Pakistan, affiliated to it and ensures proper utilization of annual and special grants given to them by the Board. The annual grants are released to the National Federations to meet their day to day expenses whereas special grants are meant for participation and holding of international sports events. These grants are allocated/approved by the executive committee of Pakistan Sports Board keeping in view the popularity of games, achievements of international level and activities of the Federations. At present, 40 National Sports Federations are affiliated with the Board. Each Federation is responsible for promotion and development of its respective game/sports.

== Sports facilities ==
- Jinnah Sports Stadium, Islamabad
- Jinnah Stadium, Gujranwala
- Jinnah Stadium, Sialkot
- Stadiums and other sports venues for Karachi, Peshawar, Lahore, Faisalabad and other cities in Pakistan are included in the lists below.

== See also ==
Listed here are the games, sports and stadiums in Pakistan

- National Games of Pakistan
- Sports in Pakistan
- List of stadiums in Pakistan
- List of cricket grounds in Pakistan
- List of sports governing bodies in Pakistan
