= History of Quetta =

Quetta (the word derives from kwatta, Pashto for qilla) is a natural fort, surrounded as it is by imposing hills on all sides. It is encircled by hills Chiltan, Takatoo, Mordar and Zarghun. It is believed that the earliest Muslim inhabitants and rulers/owners of the city were the Pashtun Kasi Tribe. Quetta was first mentioned in the 11th century when it was captured by Mahmood of Ghazni on one of his invasions of the subcontinent. In 1543 the Mughal emperor Humayun rested here on his retreat to Persia, leaving his one-year-old son Akbar until he returned two years later. The Ghilzai power in Kandahar at the beginning of the eighteenth century, simultaneously with that of the Baloch in Kalat, Quetta and Pishin became the battle-ground between the Afghans and Baloch in the region. Ahmed Shah Durrani finally handed Quetta over to the Khan of Kalat Mir Noori Naseer Khan Baloch for helping him with his army in 1751 against the Marathas in the Battle of Panipat (1761), and against the Sikhs in 1765. Today, it is an important city in Pakistan. Quetta has a majority Pashtun population, with more than 20% of its inhabitants being Pashtun (mainly of the Kasi and Kakar sub-tribes).

== History ==
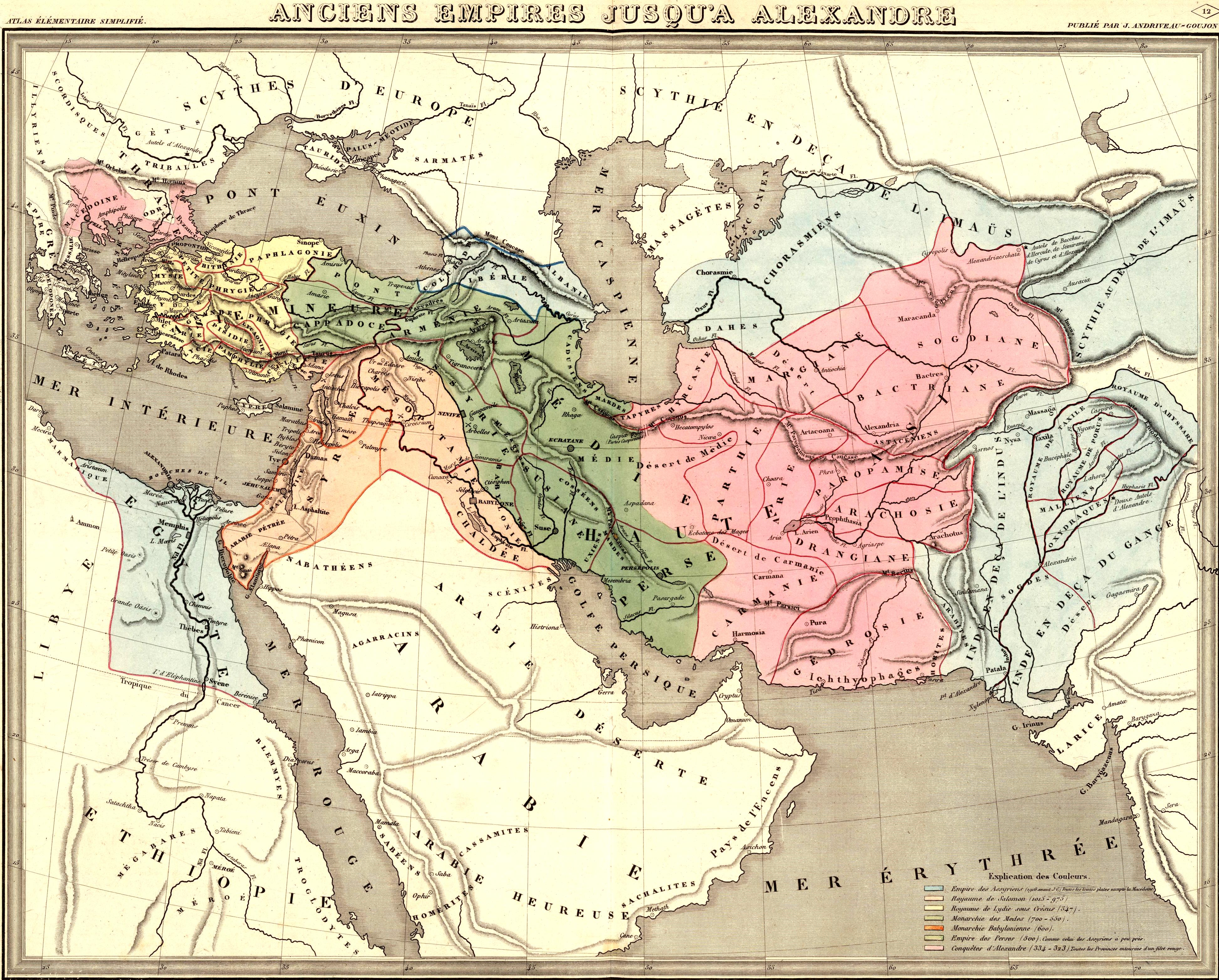
Ancient empires

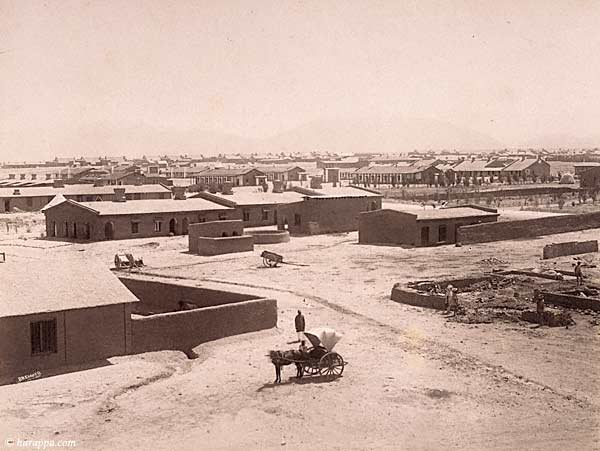
British military town Quetta, 1889

The earliest evidence of human occupation in what is now Quetta and Pakistani Balochistan is dated to the Paleolithic era, represented by hunting camps and lithic scatters (chipped and flaked stone tools). The earliest settled villages in the region date to the ceramic Neolithic (c. 7000–6000 BCE), and included the site of Mehrgarh (located in the Kachi Plain). These villages expanded in size during the subsequent Chalcolithic, when interaction was amplified. This involved the movement of finished goods and raw materials, including chank shell, lapis lazuli, turquoise, and ceramics. By 2500 BCE (the Bronze Age), the region now known as Pakistani Balochistan had become part of the Harappan cultural orbit, providing key resources to the expansive settlements of the Indus river basin to the east.

The powerful Khans of Kalat held the fort from 1512. In 1828 the first westerner to visit Quetta described it as a mud-walled fort surrounded by 300 mud houses. Although occupied briefly by the British during the First Afghan War in 1839, it was not until 1876 that Quetta came under full British control and Robert Sandeman was made political agent in Baluchistan. By the formation of political party of Muslims (Muslim league) Balochistan paid its contribution for the freedom of Pakistan. Qazi Muhammad Essa (a sunni Hazara) was the first man introduced Muslims political party in Balochistan, this struggle persisted until 1947. Following the independence of Pakistan, Balochistan joined Pakistan and Quetta became the capital of Balochistan.

The word Quetta is derived from Balochi and brahvi word (kohe ta) "Kohe" means mountains and "ta" means inside which means inside the mountains or among the mountains.Later, the British changed its name to Quetta for their convenience. Besides during the reign of fourth caliph of Rashidun Caliphate Ali ibn Abi Talib (660CE), the geography of Quetta was known as Al-Qiqan.

== Fruits in Quetta ==
Being famous for its fruits, Quetta is often called "Fruit Garden of Pakistan". The fruits here include apples, grapes, Cherries and almonds.

== See also ==
- 1935 Quetta earthquake
- 2008 Ziarat earthquake
- Bangulzai
- Bozdar
- Brahui people
- Bugti
- BUITEMS
- Pakistan Command and Staff College
- Dawi
- Ghilji
- Kakar
- Kasi (Pashtun tribe)
- Lango tribe
- Marri
- Mengal
- Pashtuns
- Quetta attack (disambiguation)
- University of Balochistan
