= Nazir Sabir =

Pakistani mountaineer

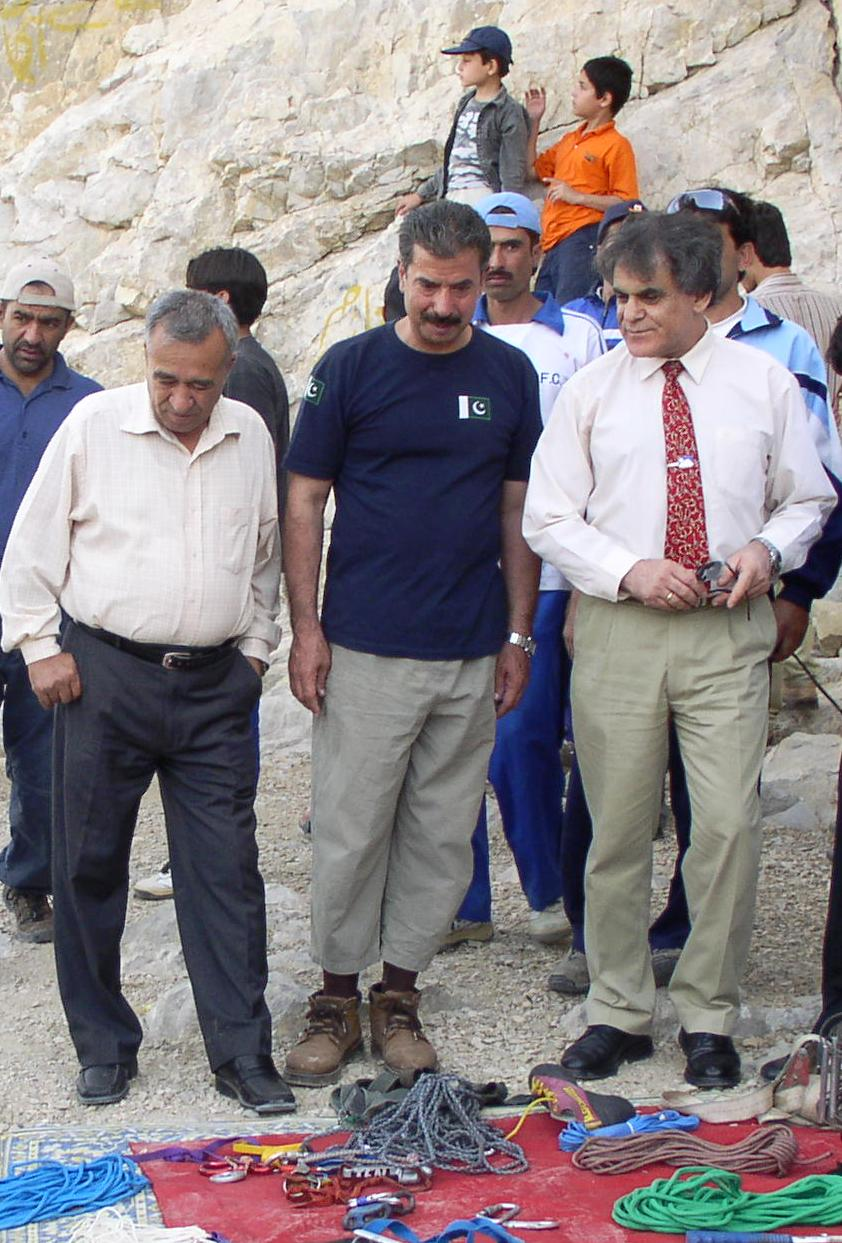
- Nazir Sabir, First from Right
- Born: Raminj, Hunza

Nazir Sabir (Urdu: نذیر صابر ) is a Pakistani mountaineer. He was born in Hunza. He has climbed Mount Everest and four of the five 8000 m peaks in Pakistan, including the world's second highest mountain K2 in 1981, Gasherbrum II 8035m, Broad Peak 8050m in 1982, and Gasherbrum I (Hidden Peak) 8068m in 1992. He became the first from Pakistan to have climbed Everest on 17 May 2000 as a team member on the Mountain Madness Everest Expedition led by Christine Boskoff from the United States that also included famed Everest climber Peter Habeler of Austria and eight Canadians.

== Climbing career ==
Sabir began his Himalayan climbing career with a Japanese expedition to the 7284 m Passu Peak in Hunza in 1974. In 1975 he was part of a German Expedition as a trainee that attempted Nanga Parbat (8125 m) and only went to 6700 m up the south west ridge. On 17 July 1976 he made the first ascent of 6660m virgin Paiyu followed by Colonel Manzoor Hussain and Major Bashir with the first Pakistani expedition organised by the Alpine Club of Pakistan.

In 1977 Sabir joined the largest Japan/Pakistan joint expedition to K2, attempting the traditional South East Abruzzi Ridge. It was a huge expedition, using bottled oxygen; this team had an army of 1500 porters and 52 members. However Sabir's first assault team including four Japanese had to turn back due to snow storms from 8280 m. Another attempt with the same team had to be abandoned again from 8150 m when they had to come down searching for two missing colleagues who were found alive below Camp 4 the next day. However they put seven members of the team on the summit making the second ascent of K2. Till then only two mountaineers of the 1954 successful Italian expedition had stepped on the K2 Summit.

Sabir was invited to climb K2 in 1981 by his friends by the Waseda University Expedition attempting the West and South West ridges rather than the usual Abruzzi ridge. The Duke of Abruzzi had, in 1909, surveyed K2 from all its sides. He felt that K2 could only be assailed from the South East Ridge, which was to be named Abruzzi Ridge. In 1978 the famous British climber Chris Bonington made his first attempt on this new route up the West Ridge. Nick Estcourt, a member of this team, was swept to his death by a slab avalanche on the way to Camp 2 while Doug Scott barely survived. It involves a difficult grade on a mixed ground of snow and rock at higher elevations. Scott, who was a member of the 1978 expedition, led another team strong teams of five top British climbers but they gave up at 7300 m due to bad weather.

Sabir, followed by Eiho Otani, reached the summit of K2 on 7 August 1981. Sabir and his team from the Waseda University created history by successfully climbing K2's West/South West Ridge for the first time. A documentary film of the climb, 50 Day Struggle was shown all over Japan, and made Sabir a household name there.

In 1982, Sabir along with Sher Khan and the famous Italian mountaineer Reinhold Messner climbed Gasherbrum II 8035m and Broad Peak 8047m. Both Gasherbrum II and Broad Peak were done in alpine style in a period of just one week, the fastest ascent of two 8000m peaks at the time.

== Expeditions to Nanga Parbat ==
He made three attempts on Nanga Parbat. His first was in October 1981, two months after his big success on K2 when he joined his friends from the Sangaku Doshikai Club Tokyo led by M. Omiya. They followed the first serious attempt route of Albert Frederick Mummery. Nanga Parbat claimed its first of many victims when Mummery and his Gurkha colleagues mysteriously disappeared in the Diamir Glacier never to be found again. Nazir and the Japanese abandoned their climb due to the heavy crevasses on the Diamir Glacier and avalanches after heavy snow fall that autumn.

He then challenged the S/S West Face also known as Schell Route of Nanga Parbat on the Rupal Flank in 1983 with Tohokeiryo Kai Club friends. As he was leading a pitch up a chest deep snow face at around 7200 m with Arai he fell 400 meters on top an avalanche along with seven Japanese colleagues nearly to the bottom of the face but barely survived as he stopped only 20 m from the edge. One of the team members, Shimura, was swept down some 2000 m to the bottom of the Rupal Face never to be found again. Sabir ended up with bruises all over his body and a sprained ankle while the team doctor Arai and Wakutsu had one broken arm each and the expedition leader Osamu Kunii survived with four broken ribs. Kunii also had a deep cut across his belly caused by the friction of the rope to such an extent that his intestines were exposed. The mountain took its toll and the expedition had to be abandoned.

In 1985 Sabir convinced his old time friend and one of the most accomplished Himalayan climbers Doug Scott and his team to go on the same route of Nanga Parbat. Scott, his son Michael, Alastair Reid and Sabir free climbed to 7150 m in a two-day push from Base Camp at 3600 m. Doug Scott got ill at the second bivouac around the same spot where they were swept with an avalanche in 1983 and had to abandon the climb.

== Death of brother ==
In July 1980, Sabir lost his elder brother Inayat Shah, who served in the Pakistan Army Special Services Group (SSG). This was Shah's second attempt on Diran on the SSG expedition. On their first trip in 1979 they had to return from merely 150 m from the summit due to Khalid Bashir who had developed pulmonary oedema and on the descent Bashir fell to his death. A year after they returned to look for the body of Khalid Bashir and also to take on Diran itself. Inayat Shah, along with the climbing leader Shaukat Nazir Hamdani and Rasheed, were buried under an ice avalanche while attempting Diran 7527 m on this second Army SSG Expedition while waiting out a bad weather spell in Camp 3 thus ending the hopes of Sabir and his brother to climb Broad Peak the following year and many mountains together.

== Everest expeditions ==
Nazir Sabir first attempted Everest leading the first Pakistan Everest Expedition of ten plus a film team led by Asad Qureshi who shot the film Everest Men Against Nature in 1997. Nazir had to abandon first summit attempt with his five colleagues due to strong blizzards blowing across the summit ridge from 8630 m and again had to return from around 8500m on their two other summit attempts due to strong winds.

Nazir returned to Mount Everest via the Nepal side in 2000. On 17 May, at 07:30, he reached the summit, becoming the first Pakistani climber to do so. He completed the final ascent during the night to avoid high winds, accompanied by Canadian climber Ben Webster and several Sherpas. Upon reaching the summit, Nazir displayed the Pakistani flag and commemorated climbers who had died on the mountain, including Scott Fischer and Rob Hall. He remained at the summit to film the arrival of other team members against the landscape of the Himalayas, including the nearby peak of Makalu.

He spoke to the base camp and sent the message of humbleness and happiness back home and to his closest friends who were watching his progress and counting steps up the last part of the mountain as he climbed through the clear night winds. He received hundreds of messages from across the country and the globe including that of Benazir Bhutto who was second to send in her congratulations from London where she lived at the time.

== Political career ==
As a reward for years of services rendered to the people of Hunza, Sabir was elected as their representative to the Gilgit Baltistan Legislative Assembly in the October 1994 elections and was appointed Advisor on Education and Tourism to the then government for a five-year term. Campaigning for the Hunza seat in the 1994 elections he defeated his opponent from the traditional Mir of Hunza family with a huge margin taking away the public mandate as a commoner for the first time.

== Honors ==
For his outstanding achievements he was awarded the prestigious Pride of Performance Award in 1982. and was honoured with The Sitara-i-Imtiaz (Star of Excellence) in 2001 for his outstanding performance in mountaineering sports.

He is the only Pakistani to have been awarded honorary membership of the Alpine Club (UK) in 1992, the Polish Mountaineering Federation in 2002 and the American Alpine Club in 2008.

His home ground latest honour is when he was unanimously elected to the seat of the Alpine Club of Pakistan as its fifth but first civilian and mountaineer president after four army generals on 10 October 2004 and again elected for another term in 2007. Presently he heads the Alpine Club of Pakistan, which trains and prepares men and women from all around Pakistan for the outdoors activities and in particular mountain climbing.

== Environmentalist ==
Sabir is currently working as an environmentalist on the conservation of wildlife in his native Hunza Valley and across Northern Pakistan including the Baltoro Glacier region. He is involved on the conservation of the 5000 years old world heritage of Juniper forests in Ziarat Balochistan in collaboration with Hayatullah Khan Durrani of Chiltan Adventurers Association Balochistan . He has also been raising voice on environmental matters in the Siachen Glacier region and across the Karakoram belt, opposing the Polo Tournaments at Shandur Pass and the Babusar Pass that is polluting the serene environment and is against the animal rights.

== International events ==
On the invitation of UIAA/IUCN he participated in the Indo-Pakistani and UK Peace Climb in the Swiss Alps in 2002, organised to focus attention on environmental degradation in the Siachen Glacier area due to the ongoing conflict between India and Pakistan.

He also attended the International Congress on "Future of Mountain Sports" at Innsbruck (Austria) in 2002, centennial celebrations of American Alpine Club in Salt Lake City in 2002, Sagarmatha Golden Jubilee celebrations in Kathmandu, Nepal in 2003.

He was a delegate at an International workshop on Food Security and Cross Border Tourism jointly organised by GTZ and AKF in Dushanbe in 2004.

For over two decades he has been representing Pakistan and delivered lectures on the tourism potential of Pakistan at international forums and Alpine Clubs in Japan, the United States, Australia, the United Kingdom, Germany, Austria, Canada, Nepal, South Korea, Hong Kong, Tajikistan, Poland, Slovakia, Malaysia, France and Italy. He was invited to be a jury member at the Banff Mountain Film Festival in 1996, Vancouver International Mountain Film Festival in 2002, Bratislava Mountain Film Festival in 2002, and was invited as chief guest at the Kathmandu International Mountain Film Festival in 2006 and the Trento Mountain Film Festival in 2003. He was honoured as the chief guest at the Kathmandu Film Festival in 2006. He represented the Alpine Club of Pakistan at the International Mountain Summit in Tyrol in November 2009 and attended the Graz Mountain Film Festival in 2009. He collaborated with Pakistan Consulate and VIMFF in organising an event "Zoom on Pakistan" and did a slide talk on his spiritual experiences on his climbs featured as "Pilgrimage to the Higher Heavens" to a keen audiences on 1 December 2009. He also spoke to the Canadian Pakistani community at the eve of Eid-e-Milad celebration organised by the Pakistan High commission.

Sabir took part at a mountain environment related conference at Golden Colorado from 31 July 2010 that addressed the huge challenges of the exit strategies in the mountain wilderness around the globe.

== Inspirational speaker ==
As a photojournalist and naturalist, Sabir has in his archives a collection of over 5000 slides of mountains and the culture surrounding them. He has been doing promotional slide shows at various Pakistani universities such as Air University ISB, Quaid Azam University, Aga Khan University, and internationally at McGill University in Canada and the University of Oxford in England to name a few and many other universities and different platforms in Pakistan and around the globe.

More recently Sabir has been delivering inspirational lectures at various universities and forums in Pakistan on his spiritual experiences, encounters with death situations that are filled with unique experiences from his over three decades of climbing in Pakistan Nepal, Tibet, European Alps and Japanese Alps and the Canadian Rockies.

== See also ==
- Alpine Club of Pakistan
- Amir Mehdi
- Ashraf Aman
- Meherban Karim
- Hunza Valley
