= Shahzada Rehmatullah Khan Durrani =

Pakistani tribal leader and politician

Shahzada Rehmatullah Khan Durrani شہزادہ رحمت اللہ خان درانی
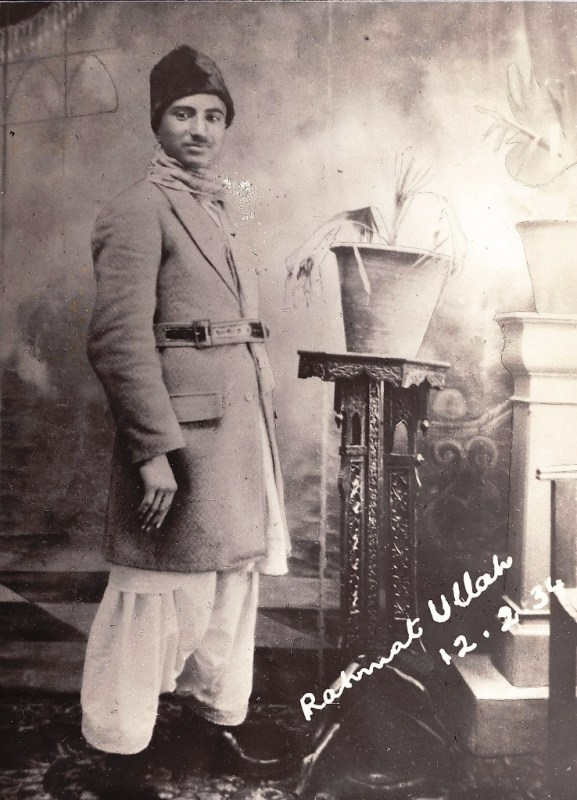

Personal details
- Born: 10 October 1919 Quetta, Baluchistan Agency, British India (present-day Quetta, Balochistan, Pakistan)
- Died: 29 November 1992 (aged 73)
- Nickname: Gul Aghaa

Shahzada Rehmatullah Khan Durrani (Pashto: شہزادہ رحمت اللہ خان درانی) was a Pakistan Movement activist born on 10 October 1919 in the Sadozai dynasty of Durrani, the ethnic Pashtun Sadozai tribe, section of the Popalzai sub clan of Durrani Abdali Pashtun tribe in British India, Quetta.

== Family ==
Shahzada Rehamatullah Khan Sadozai born in Quetta Baluchistan Agency British India in the ethnic Pashtun Sadozai tribe section of the Popalzai sub clan of Durrani Abdali Pashtuns in present Quetta, Pakistan He was a widely recognized student activist during the Pakistan Independence Movement, associated with the Muslim Students Federation in Baluchistan. He emerged as a politician and prominent figure within the Muslim League, friend of Mohammad Ali Jinnah the founder of Pakistan. His son Hayatullah Khan Durrani is first Pakistani cave explorer and recipient of British Caving Legend Award in United Kingdom and Presidential Award for Pride of Performance in Pakistan. Mohammad Abubakar Durrani is his grandson, who is 13-time National Kayak Champion of Pakistan. He has also been honored with the prestigious "Player of the Year Award" 11 times, the only Kayaking athlete to achieve this since 2007.

Family tree

Padshah Ahmad Shah Durrani; Lived: 1720/1722–1772; Reign: 1747–1772
Padshah Timur Shah Durrani; Lived: 1748–1793; Reign: 1772–1793
Padshah Mahmud Shah Durrani; Lived: 1769–1829; Reign: 1801–1803, 1809–1818
Shahzada Kamran Durrani; 1789–1840
Shahzada Nadir Bismillah Durrani; 1810–1873
Shahzada Rasheed Khan Durrani; 1832–1880
Shahzada Aalijah Nidda Durrani; 1855–1926
Shahzada Mohammad Abdul Rahim Durrani; 1877–1945
Shahzada Abdul Habib Khan Durrani; 1899–1920
Shahzada Rehmatullah Khan Durrani; 1919–1992
Shahzada Hayatullah Khan Durrani; Born: 1964
Shahzada Mohammad Abu Bakar Durrani; Born: 1995

== Early life ==
Shahzada Rehamatullah Khan Sadozai was about a year old when his father Shahzada Habibullah Khan Sadozai died. His grand-father Shahzada Mohammad Abdul Rahim Durrani and uncle Sardar Abdul Majeed Khan Durrani became his guardians. Some years later as first formally educated male of the family he assumed the control of his father's business “Khan Brothers” Reg firm since 1900. His good friends was Khan Abdul Ghafoor Khan Durrani the Popalzai Durranies Chief in Balochistan and Qazi Muhammad Essa a well known leader of the All-India Muslim League in Balochistan were backbone in the Pakistan Independent Movement aside by Founder of Pakistan from Balochistan Province. He was a social welfare volunteer, politician and one of the Pashtun tribal sadozai chiefs. He was sponsor of an Adventurers Association and football club in Quetta. His father-in-law Khan Mohammad Sadeeq Khan Ghalzai was from Loralai and Peer Zainudin Algillani, Meer Ghulam Nabi Marri (Shaheed), Haji Mohammad Hashim Khan Ghalzai, Haji Mirza Khan Peichi of Loralai were his friends.

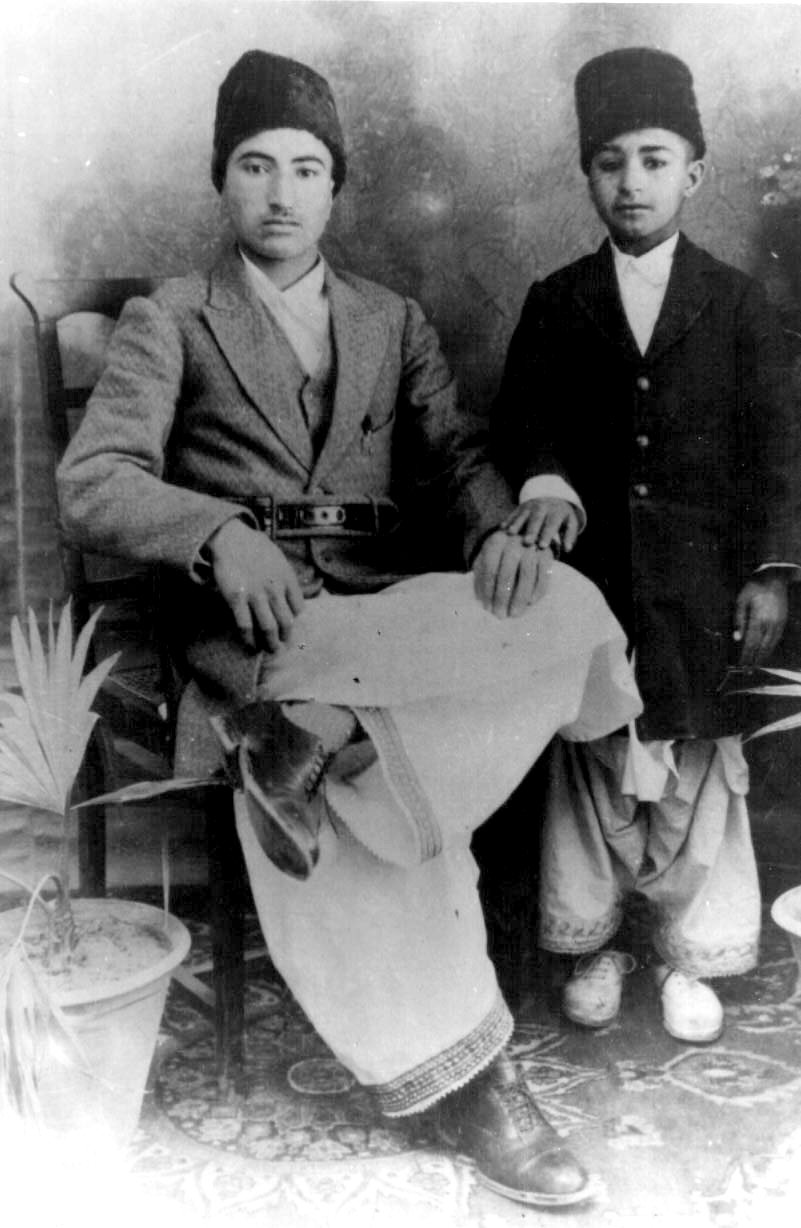
Durrani with half brother Abdul Rasheed Khan Durrani, 17 January 1931

== Political career ==
Durrani was an activist with the Muslim Students Federation Balochistan. Khan Abdul Ghafoor Khan Durrani, leader of the Muslim League, introduced him with the Quaid-e-Azam. He performed major role in the Pakistan independence movement aside with Qazi Muhammad Essa and Khan Abdul Ghafoor Khan Durrani, head of All-India Muslim League in Balochistan especially in Quetta as a loyalist Muslim league. He was a friend of Mohammad Ali Jinnah, the founder of Pakistan. On 15 June 1948 Shahzada Rehmatullah Khan Sadozai had a meeting with Jinnah and Fathima Jinnah on the eve of presentation of civic address in Town Hall Quetta.

== Commemoration ==
In a solemn gathering, the Pashtune Congress Balochistan and Sadozai Qaumi Welfare Organization Balochistan joined hands to host a memorial reference for the late Durrani at the Sadozai House in Quetta. This event was a tribute to his impactful life and legacy within the Sadozai dynasty of the Durrani Tribe. Durrani's commitment to the cause of independence, his camaraderie with Qazi Muhammad Essa Khan, and his support for Jinnah, have left an mark on the hearts of his followers, friends and family.

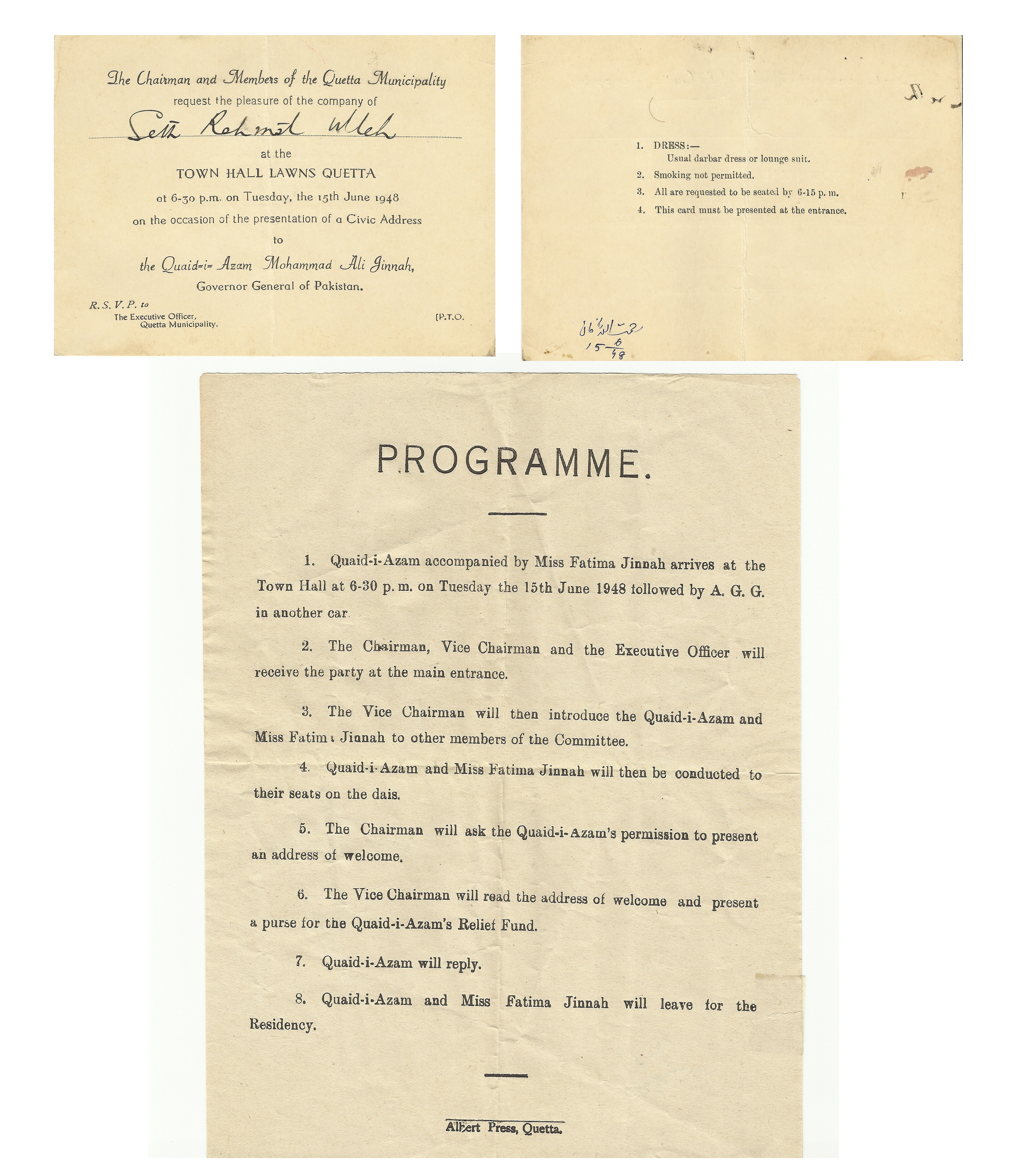
Invitation to honour Shahzada Rehmatullah Durrani for participation in the Mohammad Ali Jinnah Civic address 15-6-1948

== As volunteer ==
Durrani helped the victims of the 1935 Quetta earthquake and was the chief of the Sadozai tribe in Balochistan. He founded the Sadozai Qaumi Welfare Organization. He died from cancer on 29 November 1992 at the age of 73.
