= Ashraf Aman =

Pakistani mountain climber

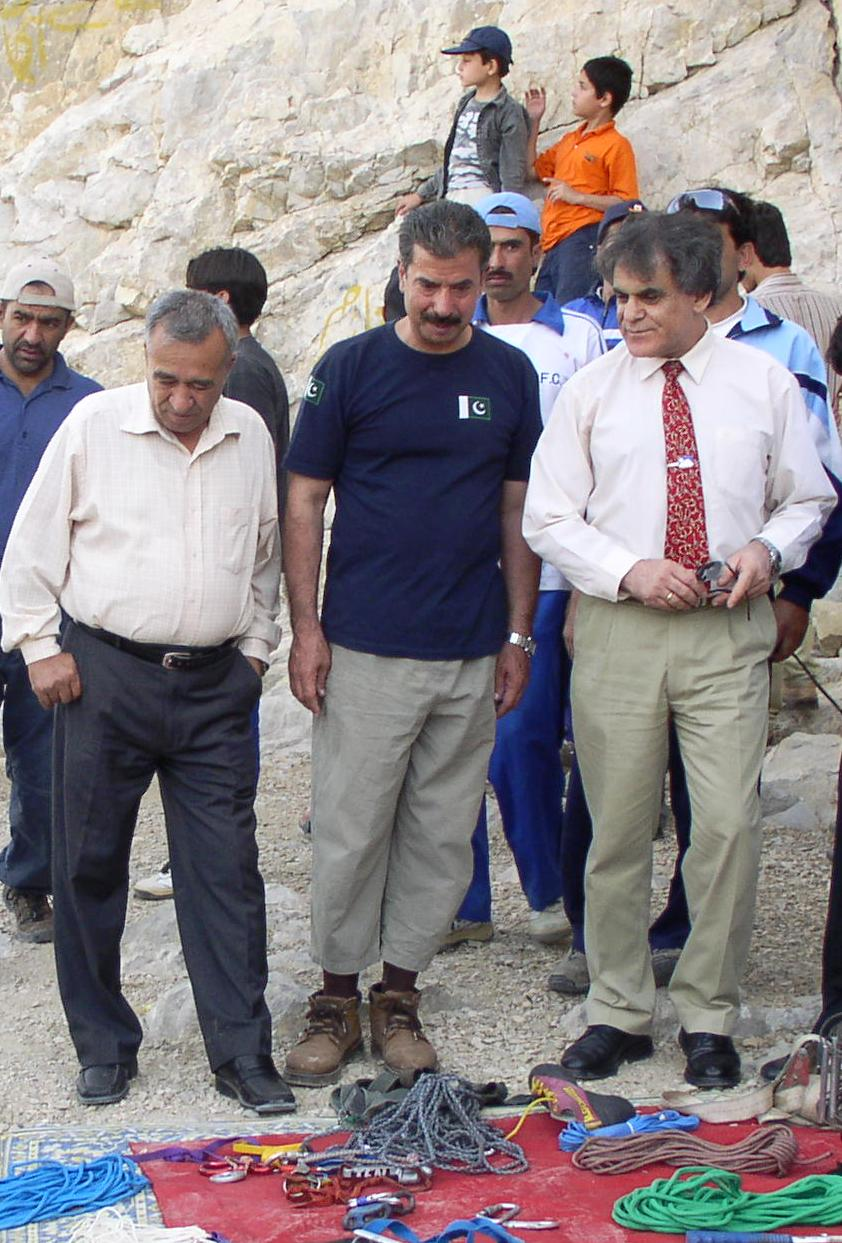
- Ashraf Aman with Hayatullah Khan Durrani and Nazir Sabir in Quetta, 2009.
- Born: 15 January 1938 (age 88)
- Education: N.E.D. Engineering University BTech
- Occupation: Adventure tours Pakistan (Owner/Chairman)
- Known for: Mountaineer, expeditionist, and Adventurer.
- Awards: Pride of Performance Award (1982)

Ashraf Aman (Urdu: اشرف امان, born 15 January 1938) is a Pakistani mountaineer, adventurer, and engineer. In 1977, he became the first Pakistani to reach the summit of K2.

== Mountaineering achievements and honours ==
- 1962 – Nanga Parbat Expedition with Germans, Awarded Himalayan Tiger.
- 1967 – Member, Pakistan Czechoslovakia joint Expedition, Awarded Gold Medal.
- 1971/76 – Mountain Guide in Himalaya, Karakoram and Hindukush.
- 1977 – Japan-Pakistan joint Expedition to K2, Became first Pakistani to climb K2 on 9 August, and then he was Awarded Presidential Award for, Pride of performance.
- 1980 – Member of International Karakoram Project, Awarded R.G.S London Fellowship.
- 1982 – Member of German Gasherbrum I Expedition.
- 1983/84 – Mountain Guide with different Mountaineering Expeditions.
- 1985 – Liaison Officer with Japanese Expedition to Nanga Parbat & Passu Peak.
- 1986 – Member with Karakoram Himalaya Research Expedition led by Professor Keith Miller in Tibet & Western China.
- 1987/88 – Liaison Officer with first Pakistani K2 Winter Expedition during the extreme cold weather from Dec-1987 to Mar-1988 led by Mr. A. Zawada.
- 1988 – Manager/Technical Engineer with K2 Italian Scientific Expedition for measuring K2, Gasherbrum I & Gasherbrum II from China side led by Professor Ardito Desio.
- 1989 – Guided Trekking group on Biafo Hispar Glacier.
- 1990 – Expedition to Mount Meckaulan Alaska.
- 1991 – Explored Chillinji Trek, First guided group on Chillinji pass.
- 1992 – Built two pulley bridges on Karakoram River and foot track between Ishkoman and Warguth.
- 1995 – L.O. French Spantik Expedition. Introduced Chinese Mountaineers to Pakistani Mountains. Baltoro Trek with BBC World Service.
- 1996 – Nepal Everest Base Camp Trek.
- 1997 – Climbed Mont Blanc on the occasion of Golden Jubilee Anniversary of Pakistan. Leader French-Pakistan joint Nanga Parbat Expedition.
- 1998 – Search for French mountaineer Mr. Eric Escoffier on Broad Peak.
- 1999 – Awarded Gold Medal UND DEI CENTO in Milan.

== Rock-climbing training for youths ==
On 26 June 2008, Ashraf Aman visited Quetta Balochistan to supervise the National male female youth rock-climbing training course accompanied by Nazir Sabir and Hayatullah Khan Durrani. The camp was organised by the Alpine Club of Pakistan and Chiltan Adventurers Association Balochistan in order to promote rock-climbing adventure sports for Pakistani youth.

== See also ==
- Amir Mehdi
- Nazir Sabir
- Samina Baig
- Meherban Karim
- Hunza Valley
