= Bangulzai =

Bangulzai may refer to:

- Bangulzai Hills, Balochistan, Pakistan
- Bangulzai (tribe), an ethnic group of Balochistan, Pakistan
