= Mohammad Abubakar Durrani =

Pakistani canoeist, documentary/short film maker, cameraman and cave photographer

- محمد ابوبکر درانی
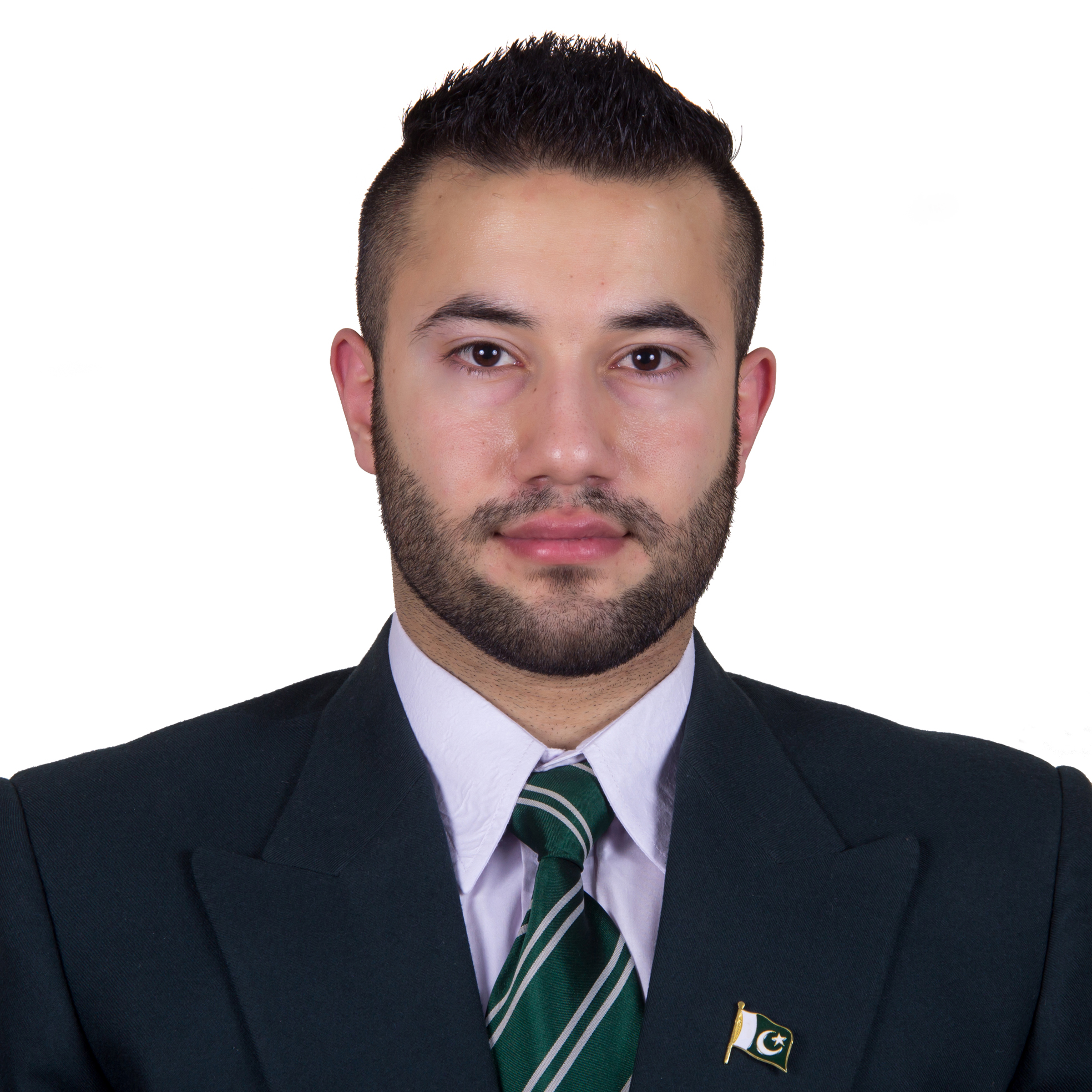
- Born: Mohammad Abubakar Durrani; 28 December 1995; Quetta, Balochistan, Pakistan
- Other name: Abu
- Education: MA
- Occupation: Canoeing / Photographer
- Years active: since 2007 to 2017
- Employer: Pakistan Customs
- Known for: Canoeing
- Parent: Hayatullah Khan Durrani

Mohammad Abubakar Durrani (Pashto: محمد ابوبکر درانی; born in Quetta Balochistan Pakistan) is a Pakistani canoeist and documentary/ short film maker, cameraman, cave photographer and owner of the Abdali Productions.

== Family background ==
Mohammad Abubakar Durrani hails from the ethnic Pashtun Sadduzai tribe, section of the Popalzai sub clan of Durrani Abdali Pashtun tribe, Mohammad Umar Durrani is his younger brother. He is son of eminent Pakistani caving legend and environmental scientists / Conservationist Hayatullah Khan Durrani and grandson of the sadozai Pashtun tribal chief and politician Shahzada Rehmatullah Khan Durrani.

Family tree

Padshah Ahmad Shah Durrani; Lived: 1720/1722–1772; Reign: 1747–1772
Padshah Timur Shah Durrani; Lived: 1748–1793; Reign: 1772–1793
Padshah Mahmud Shah Durrani; Lived: 1769–1829; Reign: 1801–1803, 1809–1818
Shahzada Kamran Durrani; 1789–1840
Shahzada Nadir Bismillah Durrani; 1810–1873
Shahzada Rasheed Khan Durrani; 1832–1880
Shahzada Aalijah Nidda Durrani; 1855–1926
Shahzada Mohammad Abdul Rahim Durrani; 1877–1945
Shahzada Abdul Habib Khan Durrani; 1899–1920
Shahzada Rehmatullah Khan Durrani; 1919–1992
Shahzada Hayatullah Khan Durrani; Born: 1964
Shahzada Mohammad Abu Bakar Durrani; Born: 1995

== Early life ==
Durrani became involved in the sport of kayaking as a child and went with his father to Hanna Lake to his father's water sports academy (Hayat Durrani Water Sports Academy)(HDWSA).

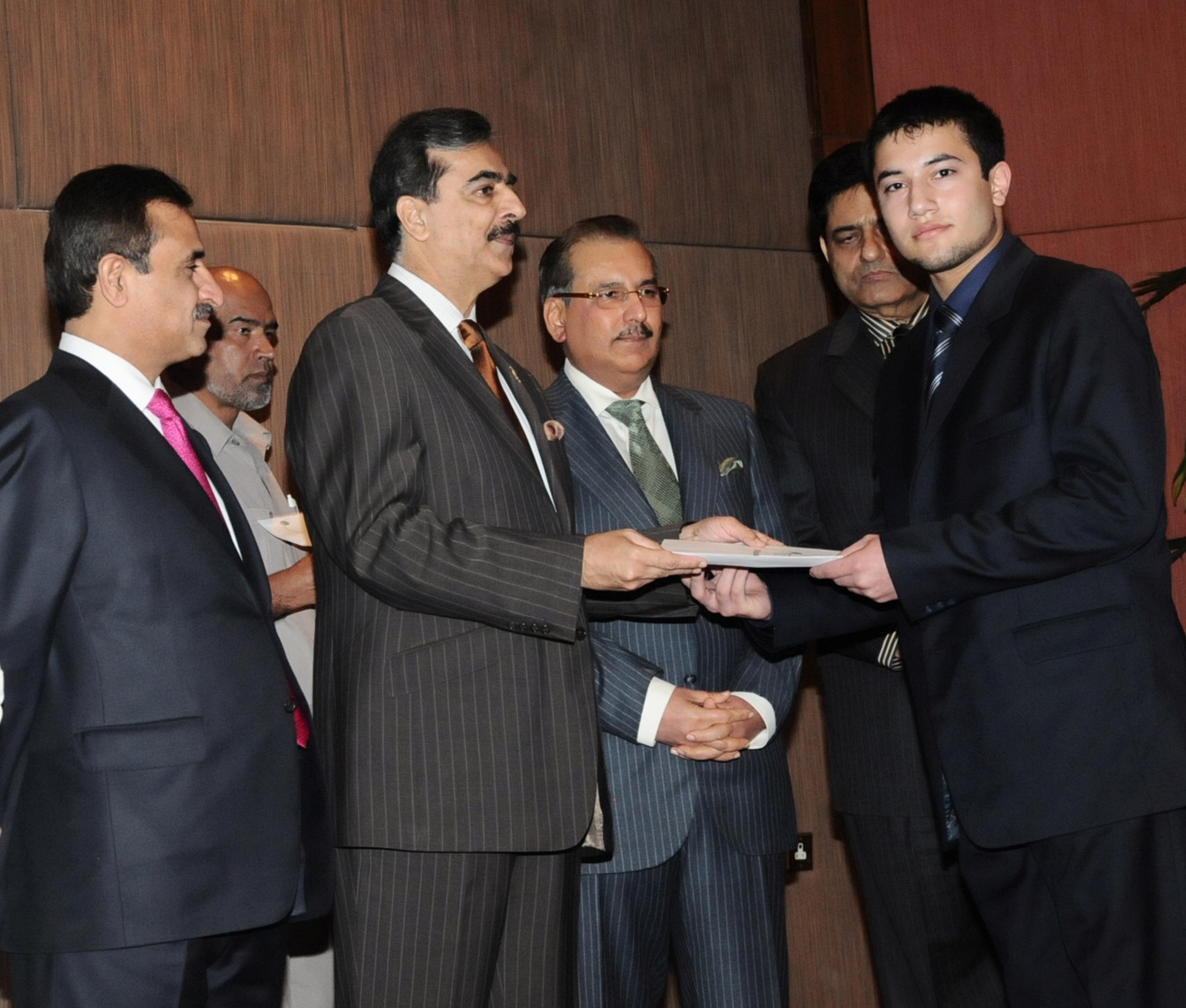
Mohammad Abubakar Durrani receiving the Award from Prime Minister Mr. Yousaf Raza Gillani

He won his first Gold medal in Competition held in 2005 at HDWSA Hanna Lake Quetta in Category K,1 (U 10). His major Achievement was winning the under 16 and 18 Gold Medals in Pakistan's National Canoeing Championship held in 2007 at Rawal Lake Islamabad. He is the youngest Kayak paddler athlete to have won the "Player of the Year Award" and is the only Kayaking player to have won this outstanding award in Pakistan eight consecutive times since 2007. Muhammad Abubakar Durrani defended his title and won National canoeing Championship 2022. Muhammad Abubakar Durrani leading Balochistan Province won "34th National Games Quetta 2023 Sprint Canoeing Championship and clinched three Gold Medals in different events aggregately K-1, 200M (Men) K-2, 200M (Men) K-2, 200M (MW/Mix) and declared best Kayaking athlete of the National Games championship.

The National Games Quetta 2023 Canoeing Sprint events were organized at Balochistan’s first and only Canoe Kayak and Rowing Olympic Sports International Academy "Hayat Durrani CanoeKayak / Water Sports Academy (Pvt.Ltd) & Ranch in Hanna lake Quetta in collaboration with the Pakistan Canoe & Kayak Federation, adhering to ICF rules. In the history of National Games of Pakistan Canoeing Sprint events were included first time in the National games of Pakistan provided an electrifying atmosphere as the country's top kayakers battled it out on the challenging waters at Hanna Lake.

== International Participation ==
Mohammad Abubakar Durrani Participated in the 14th and 15th Asian Canoe Sprint Championships held in Tehran Iran 2011 and in the historical city of Samarqand Uzbekistan 2013. He participated as official of National Speleological and Caving Team of Pakistan in 5th European Speleo Caving Conference 2016 Yorkshire and 10th PAK-Britain Friendship Caving and Speleo Expedition 2016 under the auspicious of British Caving Association and Orpheus Caving Club Derby-shire Great Britain.

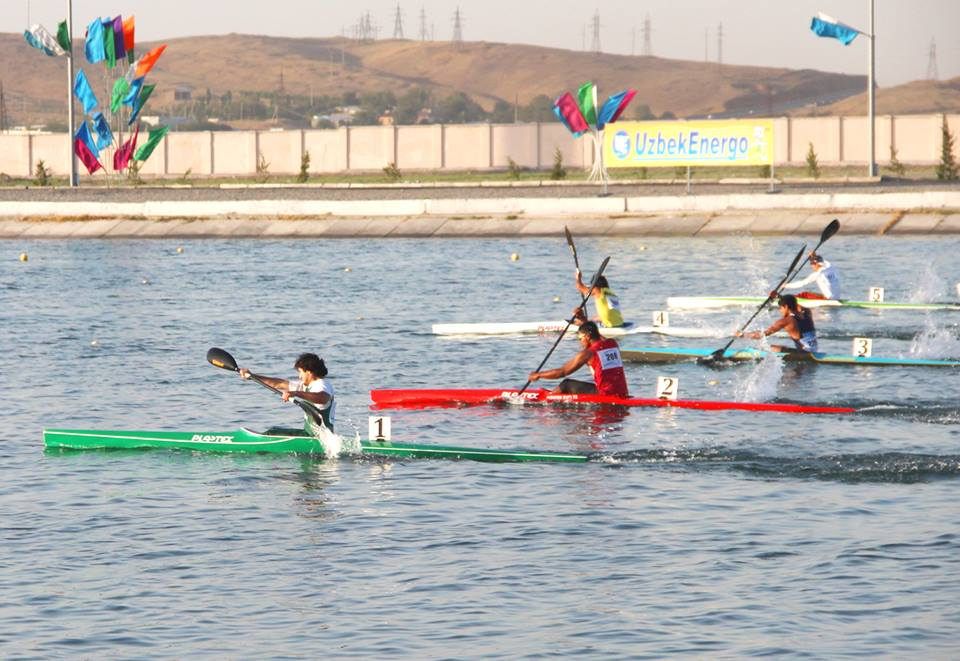
Mohammad Abubakar Durrani (lane 1) in 15th Asian Canoe Sprint Championship Samarqand 2013

He represented Pakistan in the ICF international Canoeing championship held in Aronzo Di Cadore Italy 30 June to 2 July 2017 and subsequently in July 2019 and performed excellent, on his returned from Italy the Governor Balochistan invited the Pakistan National Canoeing team including Abubakar Durrani at Governor House, Quetta and appreciated his performance in the ICF Canoeing Championship in Italy.

Abubakar Durrani and Shoaib Khilji Pakistan National Junior Kayaking Champions
