= Abdul Ghafoor Khan Durrani =

Pakistani politician (1910–2000)

- عبدالغفور خان درانی
- Born: 1910; Quetta, Baluchistan Agency, British India
- Died: 2000 (aged 90); Quetta, Balochistan, Pakistan
- Known for: Political Struggle (Muslim league)

Abdul Ghafoor Khan Durrani (Pashto: عبدالغفور خان درانی) (1910 – 2000) was a Pakistani politician. He was born in Quetta, Balochistan, British India in 1910.

== Political career ==
He brought Shahzada Rehmatullah Khan Saddozai, chief of the Sadozai Durrani tribe of Balochistan, into the Muslim League for an important role in the Pakistan Independence movement. In November 1959 all the Chairmen of Union Committees within Quetta city became members of the Quetta Municipal Committee and then Khan Abdul Ghafoor Khan Durrani was elected its 1st Vice Chairman, whereas the Quetta Political Agent remained as its chairman. He was also the General Secretary of Anjuman e Islamia Quetta.

== See also ==
- Jinnah
