= Hayatullah Khan Durrani =

Pakistani caver and mountain climber

Hayatullah Khan Durrani حیا ت الله خان درانی PP
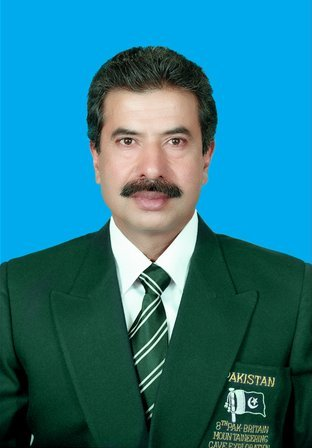
- Born: 22 April 1962 (age 64); Quetta, Pakistan
- Other name: Shalako
- Occupation: Government Service / FBR
- Known for: Mountaineering / caving / Environmentalist
- Notable work: Juniper Defender / Pioneer Caving in Pakistan
- Children: Mohammad Abubakar Durrani Muhammad Umar Durrani
- Parent: Shahzada Rehmatullah Khan Durrani
- Awards: Pride of Performance award by the Government of Pakistan in 2006
- Website: http://www.pcra.20m.com/ http://pcakf.com/

Hayatullah Khan Durrani, PP (Pashto: حیا ت الله خان دراني; born 22 April 1962) is a Pakistani caver, mountaineer, environmentalist, organizer, and rescuer. He is also a part-time sports anchor actor on Pakistani television. He played a significant role in the promotion of mountaineering, rock climbing, caving, canoeing, and, kayaking as adventure sports in Pakistan. He is a naturalist and early advocate of preservation of Juniper forests Juniperus macropoda wilderness in Ziarat and adjacent areas in Balochistan. He is the founder and President of the Pakistan Cave Research & Caving Federation (PCRCF) and the Director of the Asian Canoe Confederation (ACC).

== Education career ==
Durrani obtained a master's degree in Sociology from Balochistan University, Quetta in 1987.

He is currently performing the duties of the post of Deputy Superintendent (OPS) and Sports Secretary of Pakistan Customs Sports Board. Hayatullah Khan Durrani, Founder and Chief Executive of HDWSA, warmly welcomed the officers' guests from Pakistan Customs Quetta at the Customs Sponsored renowned (HDWSA) Hayat Durrani Water Sports Academy International (Pvt. Ltd) and its sprawling ranch at Hanna Lake Quetta, where Durrani outlined HDWSA's activities and highlighted the achievements of the athletes. The customs officers praised the remarkable dedication of Customs officer Hayatullah Khan Durrani to the academy and the successes of customs Canoeing team and National canoe Kayak, and Rowing athletes. Pakistan Customs Quetta Collectorate in collaboration with Hayatullah Khan Durrani the founder of Chiltan Adventurers Association Balochistan commemorated Pakistan Day by raising the National flag of Pakistan on the mountains top near Ziarat District.

== Family ==
Hayatullah Khan Durrani belongs to the ethnic Pashtun Sadozai tribe section of the Popalzai sub clan of Durrani Abdali Pashtuns in Quetta, Pakistan his father Shahzada Rehmatullah Khan Saddozai Durrani was a very well-known student activist during the Pakistan Independent Movement of Muslim students federation Balochistan and was a loyal politician "a prominent personality" of Muslim league friend with Mohammad Ali Jinnah Quaid-e-Azam (Urdu: قائد اعظم) ("Father of the Nation") the founder of Pakistan. His son Mohammad Abubakar Durrani is the youngest Kayak paddler athlete to have won the "Player of the Year Award" and is the only Kayaking player to have won this outstanding award in Pakistan six consecutive times since 2007.

Family tree

Padshah Ahmad Shah Durrani; Lived: 1720/1722–1772; Reign: 1747–1772
Padshah Timur Shah Durrani; Lived: 1748–1793; Reign: 1772–1793
Padshah Mahmud Shah Durrani; Lived: 1769–1829; Reign: 1801–1803, 1809–1818
Shahzada Kamran Durrani; 1789–1840
Shahzada Nadir Bismillah Durrani; 1810–1873
Shahzada Rasheed Khan Durrani; 1832–1880
Shahzada Aalijah Nidda Durrani; 1855–1926
Shahzada Mohammad Abdul Rahim Durrani; 1877–1945
Shahzada Abdul Habib Khan Durrani; 1899–1920
Shahzada Rehmatullah Khan Durrani; 1919–1992
Shahzada Hayatullah Khan Durrani; Born: 1964
Shahzada Mohammad Abu Bakar Durrani; Born: 1995

== Adventure sports career ==
Pride of Performance
- Date: 23 March 2006
- Country: Islamic Republic of Pakistan
- Presented by: Government of Pakistan

On 14 August 1984 Hayatullah Khan Durrani founded and established Chiltan Adventurers Association Balochistan (CAAB), the first and only caving adventure sports / speleological rescue organization in Pakistan and the first mountaineering adventure sports organization in Quetta Balochistan. He has headed the association ever since. On 14 August 1994 as first Pakistani Eminent Cave explorer he founded the Pakistan Cave Research & Caving Federation (PCRCF) for caving, speleological and rescue activities in Pakistan.

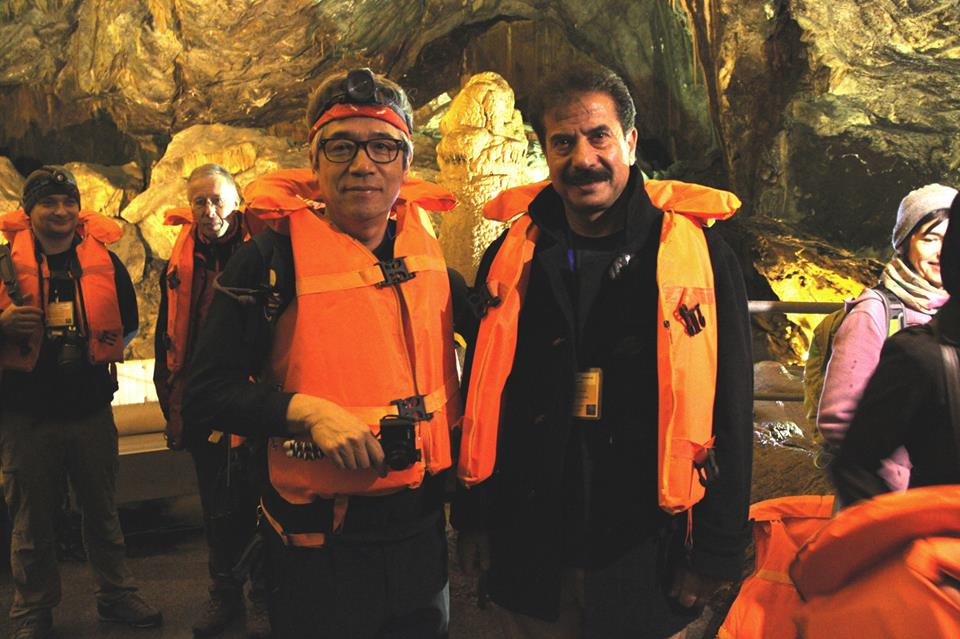
Hayatullah Khan Durrani and Prof:Kyung Sik Woo President Union of International Speleology (UIS) in Alisaddar Cave Hamadan Iran

In 1994 and 1999 his pursuit of adventure sports activities took him to Derbyshire, United Kingdom, where he completed a caving and rock-climbing advanced course under the supervision of Simon James Brooks and Boyed Potts from the Orpheus Caving Club unit of the British Cave Research Association and British Caving Association.

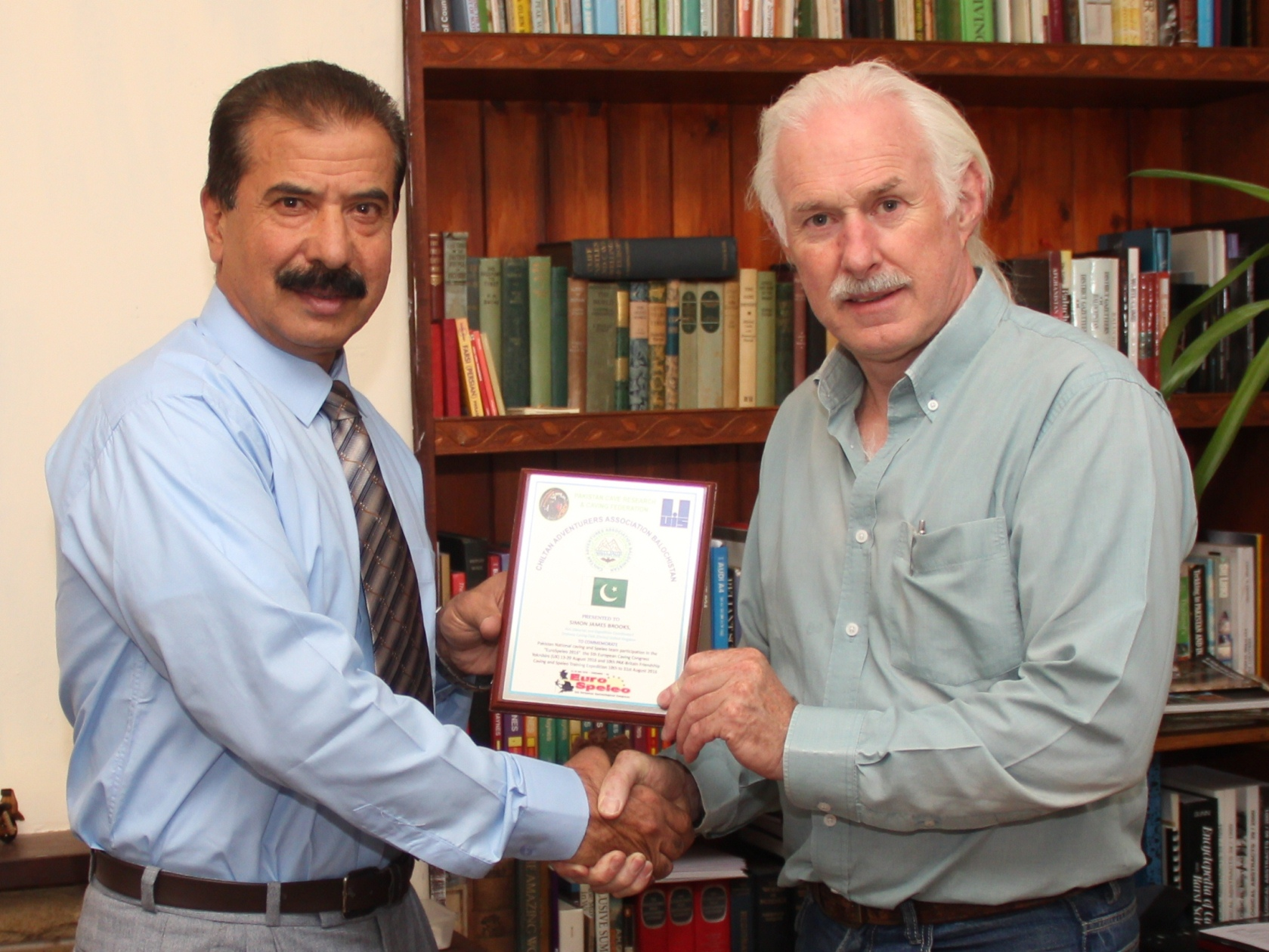
Hayatullah Khan Durrani Presenting Commemorative Shield to Simon James Brooks Peek District Great Britain 2016

BBC Radio Derby interviewed him for the Pak-Britain caving expedition.

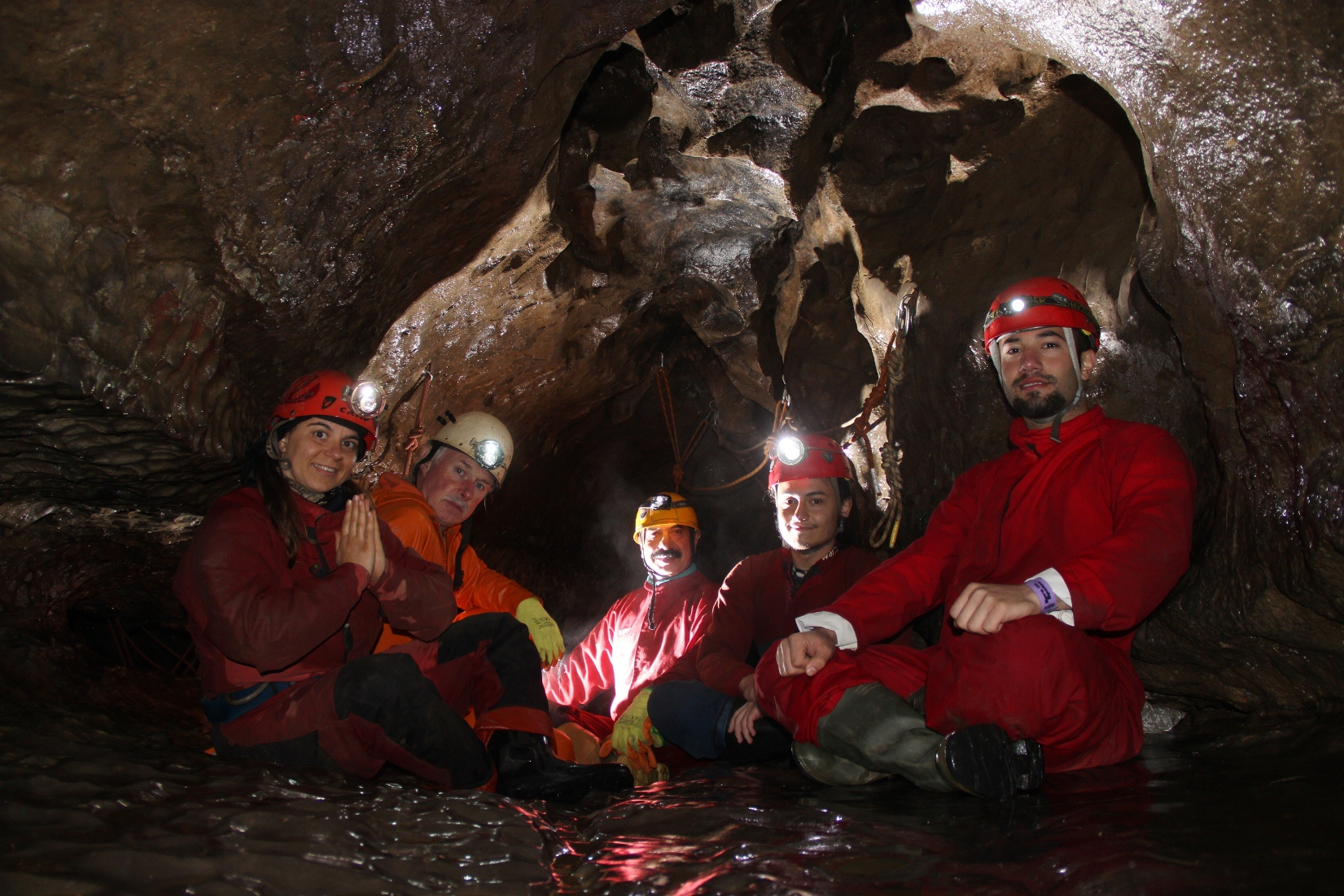
Hayatullah Khan Durrani and Pakistan caving team with Simon James Brooks in Yorkshire August 2016 Great Britain

Durrani has spent a major part of his life promoting mountain climbing and caving (speleology) to the youth of Pakistan. He has an individual international record of exploring 128 caves in Pakistan. Since 1984 he has celebrated Pakistan's Nation-day event every year by hoisting the Pakistani national flag on mountains in Pakistan and abroad. His tradition of raising the flag on mountain summits has acquired him a unique status in the country. On the basis of meritorious services of Mr. Durrani, the General Assembly of the Union of International Speleology (39 represented countries in Athens Greece 14th ICS 2005) voted on him having Pakistan as a member country to the Union International de Spéléologie (UIS). He is country representative of Union International de Spéléologie (UIS) for Pakistan and founder/ President of Pakistan Cave Research & Caving Federation. He is representative of ACP islamabad and Director of the Alpine Club Pakistan (ACP) Balochistan branch. On 14 August 2005, in recognition of his lifelong services to caving, mountain adventure, as Juniper Defender and water sports in Pakistan, the honorable President, Islamic Republic of Pakistan, bestowed on him the "President's Award for Pride of Performance". Hayatullah Durrani represented Pakistan in 1st and 2nd International Geosciences (Speleology) Congresses in Iran as National Speleo and Caving team leader of Pakistan 16 January 2014 / 22 February 2016. on official invitation National Speleological and Caving Team of Pakistan headed by team leader Hayatullah Khan Durrani Participate in 5th European Speleo Caving (Eurospeleo Conference 2016) Yorkshire and 10th PAK-Britain Friendship Caving and Speleo Expedition 13 to 31 August 2016 under the patronage of BCA British Caving Association and Orpheus Caving Club Derby-shire United Kingdom. He also attended the Bureau meeting of International Union of Speleology held in Yorkshire. Legendary Cave Explorer Hayatullah Khan Durrani was Awarded Caving Legend Award on 27 September 2018 at Orpheus Caving Club Headquarters Derby shire Great Britain Celebrating Pak-Britain Joint Silver Jubilee 28 years of friendship, cooperation and partnership in caving. Hayatullah Khan Durrani is first Pakistani in the history who has received this prestigious Award. The British Cave explorer and Speleologist Simon James Brooks official of Orpheus Caving Club (OCC) and Secretary British Caving Association Bestow the Award and Certificate to Hayatullah Khan Durrani on account of his outstanding performance and meritorious services rendered for the past 28 years regarding Pak-Britain joint Caving / Speleo expeditions and to strengthen the ties and bond of friendship between the respective Organisations and Countries under the banner of Chiltan Adventurers Association Balochistan and Pakistan cave Research and caving Federation jointly with Orpheus Caving Club Great Britain.

== Rock-Climbing Training for Youths ==
On 26 June 2008 Alpine Club of Pakistan (Islamabad) and Chiltan Adventures Association Balochistan Organized Rock-Climbing training camp with collaboration of Pakistan Cave Research and Caving Federation in Quetta

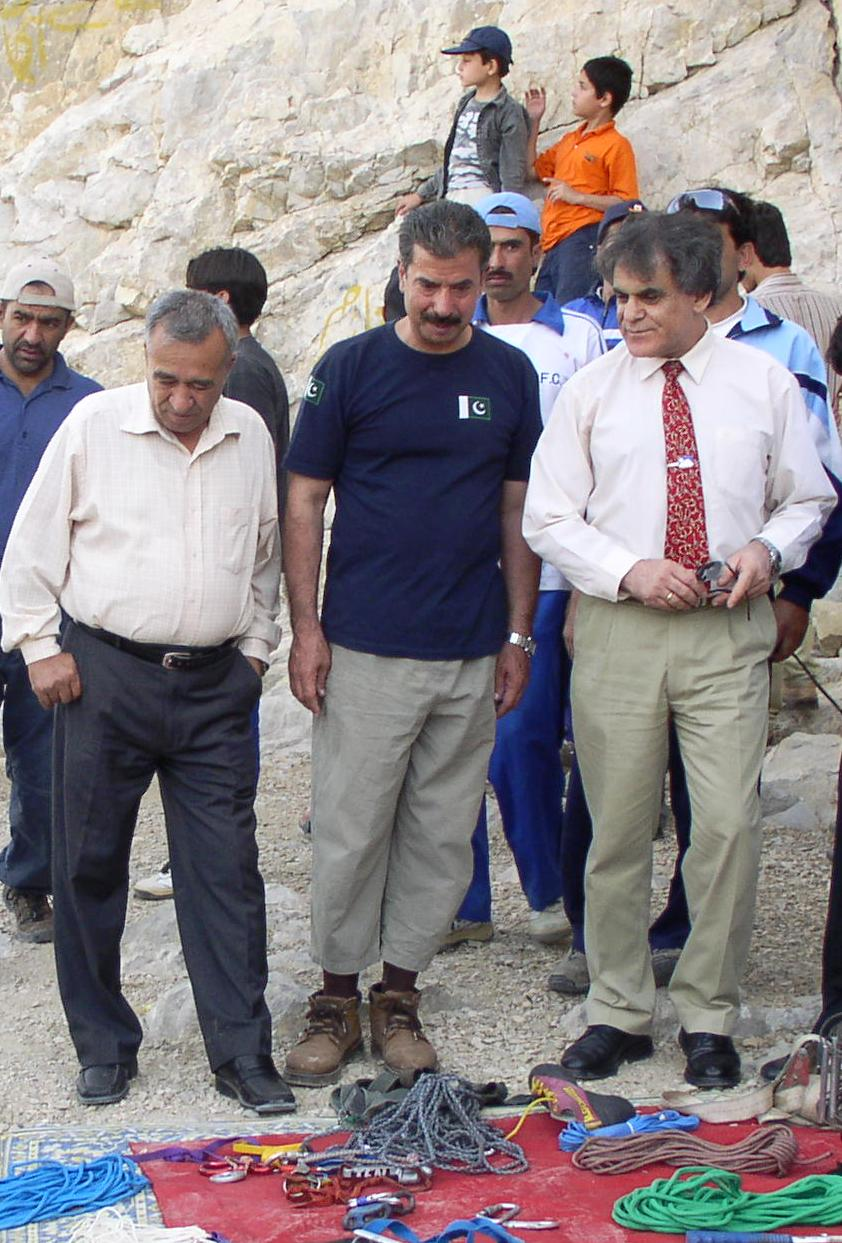
Hayatullah Khan Durrani with Ashraf Aman and Nazir Sabir (Pakistan's three Notable Mountaineers) supervising a Rock-Climbing camp Quetta 26 June 2008

as a part of promotion and development of Rock-climbing Adventure sports in youth of Pakistan.Nazir Sabir and Ashraf Aman Visited Quetta Balochistan to supervise the National male female youth Rock-climbing training Course. Hayatullah Khan Durrani was the Director and chief organizer of the camp.

== Raka Poshi Expedition ==
August 2003 Hayatullah Khan Durrani as leader of Chiltan Adventures Association Balochistan Mountaineering team climbed Rakaposhi mount in the Karakoram mountain range in Pakistan.

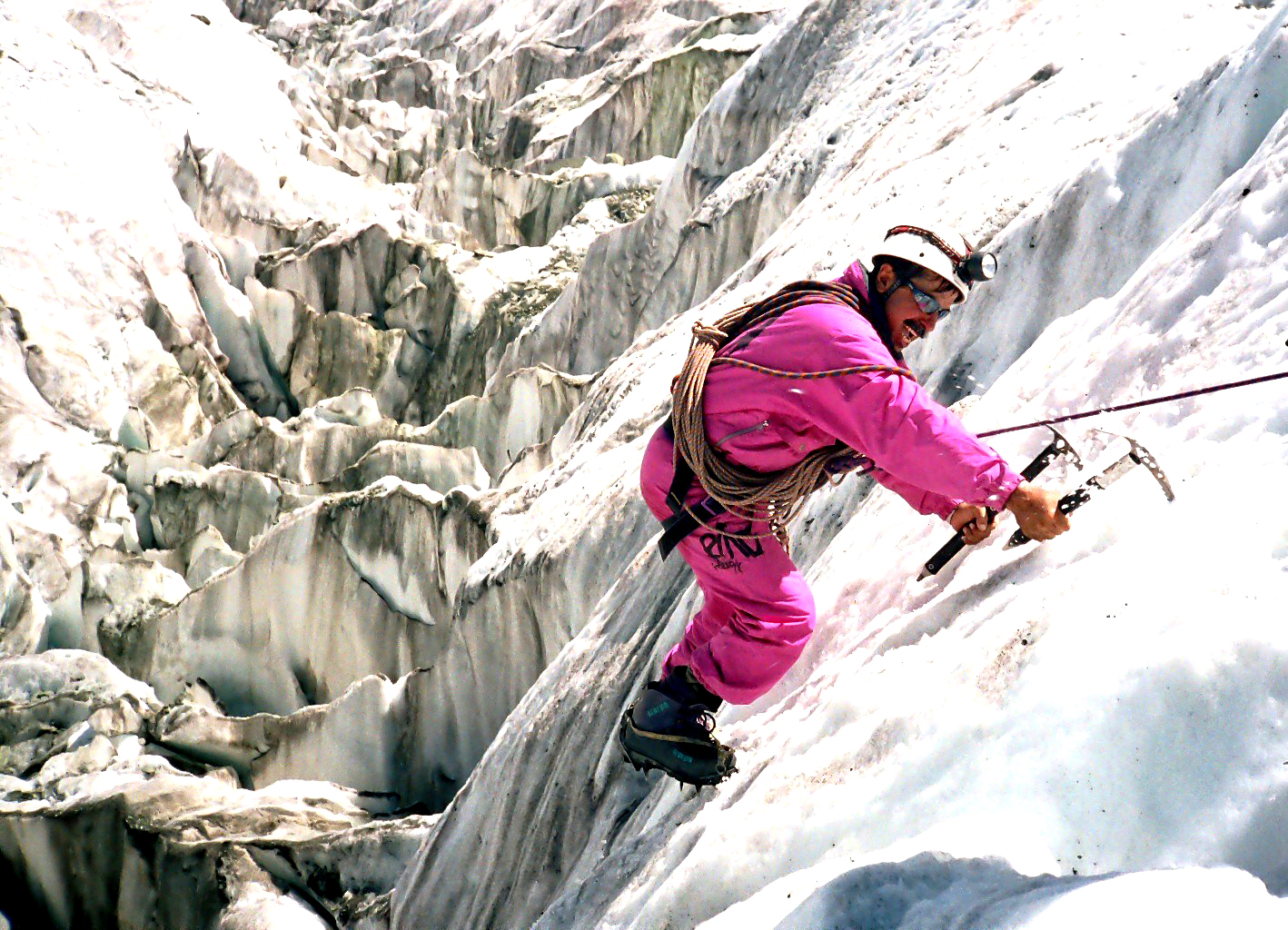
Hayatullah Khan Durrani in Raka Poshi Mount Expedition 2003.

The Secretary of Alpine Club of Pakistan Saad Tariq Siddiqi was the Chief organiser of the Expedition, the other mountaineers accompany with Durrani were Malik Abdul Rahim Baabai, Jan Mohammad Durrani, Mohammad Ali Khan Mandokhail(Late)and Noor Mohammad Khilj, Naseebullah Khilji (Late) was slipped and fell on the descent and badly injured other member of the expedition were stayed in the last base camp. Rakaposhi means "Snow Covered" in the local language. It is ranked 27th highest in the world and 12th highest in Pakistan and this mount is more popular for its beauty than its highest rank.

== K2 Base Camp Expedition ==
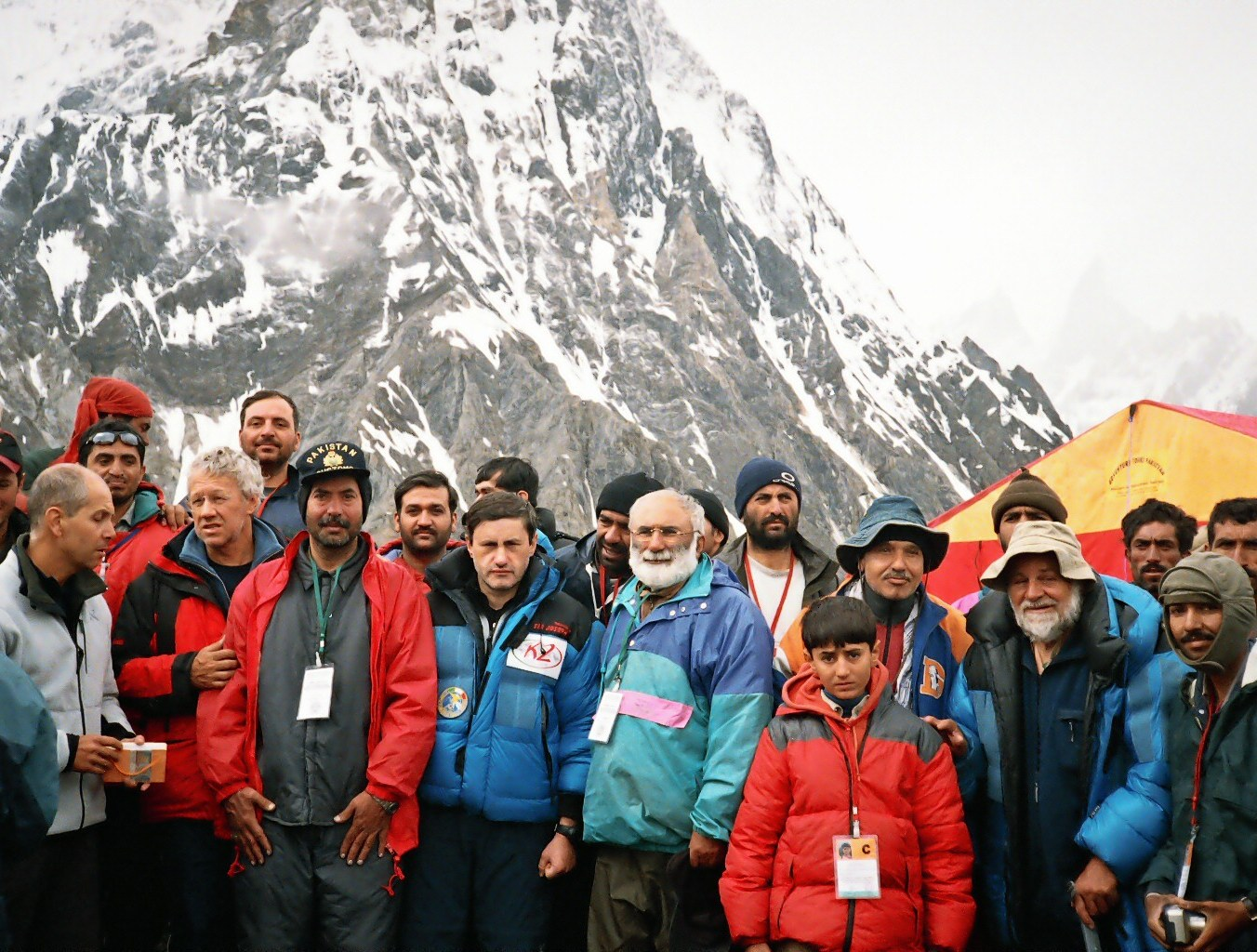
Group of Chiltan Adventurers with Hayatullah Khan Durrani Lino Lacedelli and Gianni Alemanno at Concordia base camp 2004

In July August 2004 Hayatullah Khan Durrani was nominated by ACP Islamabad as expedition chief of the Pakistani National mountaineering expedition to represent Pakistan in the 1st climbed of Golden Jubilee ceremony of k2 mount organised by the Government of Italy under the leadership of Italian federal Minister Gianni Alemanno Gerygory Alemano accompanied by Lino Lacedelli the first mountaineer on earth who climbed K2 in 1953. at the Concordia base Camp Mr. Durrani along with his team meet the official delegate of the Italy headed by Gianni Alemanno and Lino Lacedelli and then left for K-2 expedition.

== Environmental work ==
Hayatullah Khan Durrani is a naturalist, author, and early advocate of preservation of Juniper Forests and wilderness in Ziarat and adjacent areas in Balochistan Pakistan. as volunteers activists he has strong views as environmental scientists on issues that concern the environment protection. His outstanding exploration work telling of his adventures in nature, especially in the KoheKhilifath and Zarghoon Mountain regions of Balochistan have been read by millions. His activism helped to save the United Nations Heritage the world's 2nd largest Juniper Forest in Ziarat, Chotiari and Shabaan Zarghoon Valleys. As environmentalist and Conservationist Durrani broadly supports the goals of the environmental movement that seeks to improve and protect the quality of the natural environment through changes to environmentally harmful human activities" as an environmentalist he is engaged in or believes in the philosophy of environmentalism. Durrani is involved in conserving Juniperus macropoda junipers and the wildlife of Ziarat and Zarghoon mount Zarghoon Ghar areas.

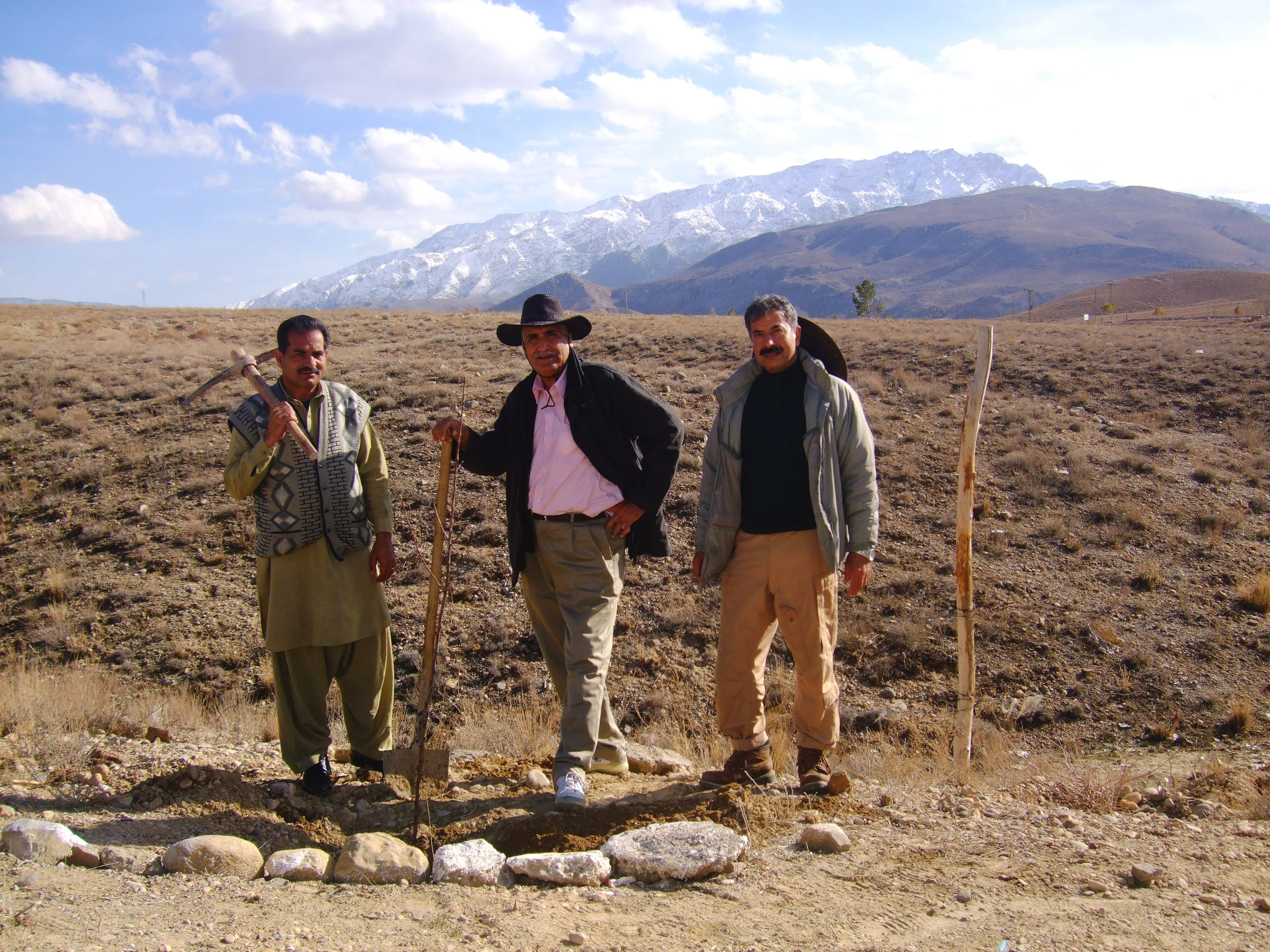
Munir Ahmed Badini planting tree with Hayat Durrani at HDWSA.

He had establish a Juniper Defenders center at Chautair Valley, Ziarat to educate people and to create awareness especially among young people through a long-distance 120 km (75 mi) walk from Quetta to Ziarat regarding to stop the destruction of this valuable world heritage and the endangered species within. He has taken remedial measures to stop the destruction of this valuable world heritage and important ecosystem and the endangered species within. Upon the invitation of Durrani, Nazir Sabir, a Pakistan mountaineer, visited Quetta and Ziarat to jointly work with him alongside CAAB for the conservation of the Juniper forests of Ziarat.

The 29 October 2008 Ziarat earthquake (6.4 M_{w}) affected the surrounding areas. The villagers used Juniper trees as firewood at a very critical time for junipers to be protected. Hayat Durrani raised voice as juniper defender in 1984 from the platform of Chiltan Adventures Association Balochistan, the Silver Jubilee Camp of the Juniper defenders was scheduled to be held in Ziarat in the end of October 2012 to celebrate the 25 years as juniper defenders. On 25 October 2010 The Government of Balochistan Sports, Environment and Youth Affairs Departments announce the Silver Jubilee "Juniper Defender Award" to Hayatullah Khan Durrani on the eve Silver Jubilee of Chiltan Adventurers Association Balochistan from his long outstanding performance since 1984 as an environment analyst of the preservation of the 3000-year-old word heritage of Juniper forests and wildlife in Ziarat and Koh-i-Zarghoon region of Balochistan Pakistan.

== Establishment of HDWSA for Canoeing & Rowing ==
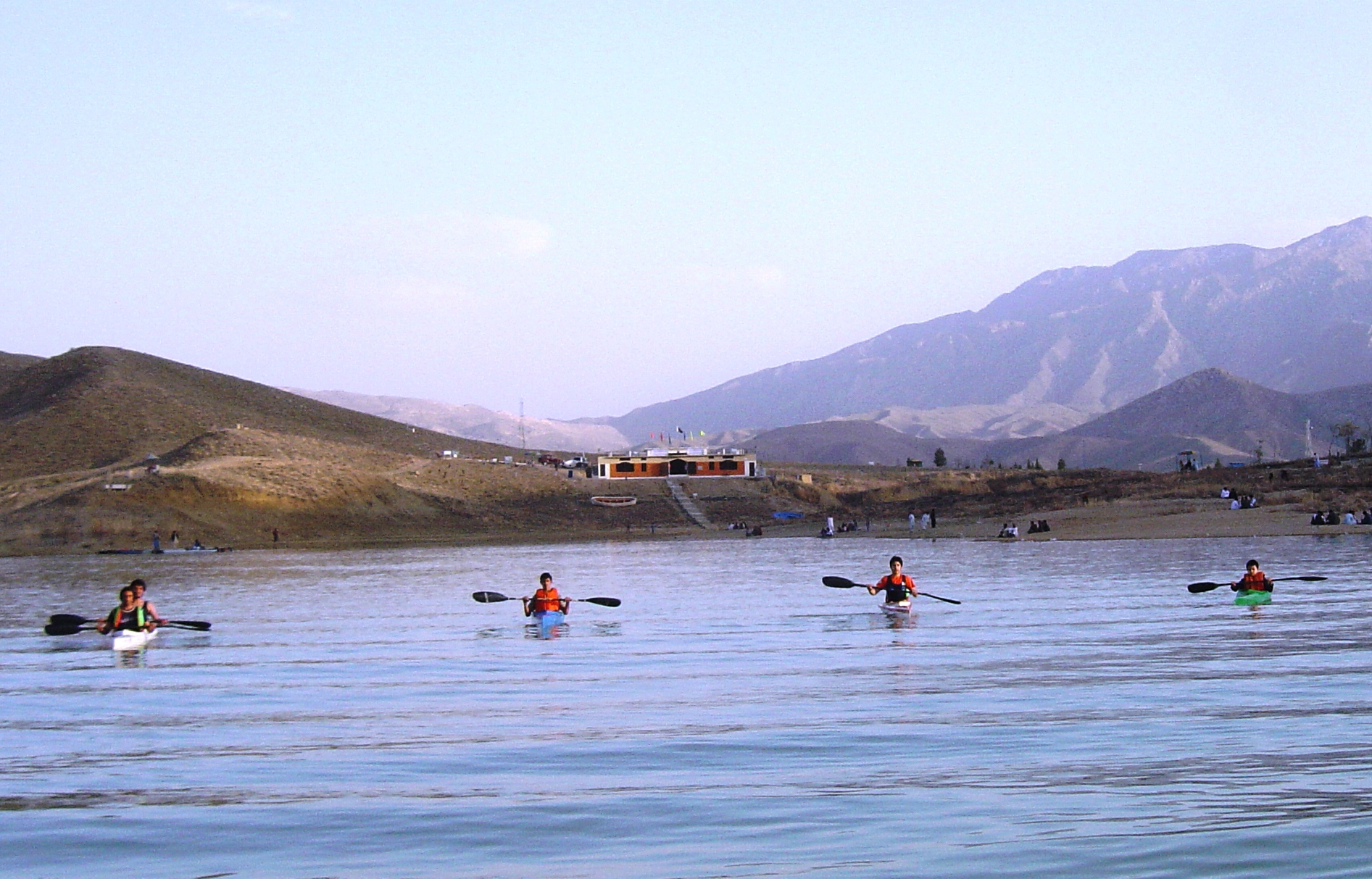
Kayaking training in front of Modern Building of Hayat Durrani Water Sports Academy (HDWSA) at Hanna Lake Quetta

Hayatullah Khan Durrani established Hayat Durrani Water Sports Academy (HDWSA) and its sprawling ranch On 14 August Pakistan Independence-Day 1986 Balochistan's first and only Rowing, Canoeing, Kayaking, Sailing, Swimming and boating training center / academy at Hanna Lake Quetta for the young generation of the country. Hayatullah Khan Durrani (PP) is founder and Chief Executive of HDWSA and this academy provides all equipment's and experts facilities free of cost for training and events to all male female students canoe, kayak paddlers, Rowers and optimist sailors belongs to different Schools, colleges, Universities and members of HDWSA, BCA, BRA, PCKF, PRF, PSA and events participants etc. The old building of HDWSA was replaced and modern building of HDWSA boat house was constructed in 2007 for the development of above said sports. HDWSA is Pakistan's first and only International sports academy where players gets training of above cited sports free of cost and without any fee furthermore to involve young generation and youth male female canoeists and rowers in the importance of environment, a small protect environment tree plantation project has been also established for the protection of environment and beautification of Hanna Lake. Mr. Durrani formed Pakistan Canoe and Kayak Federation to further develop the canoe and Kayak sports in the country and provide opportunities to the young generation of Pakistan to contest on International level. Hayatullah Khan Durrani elected Director Asian Canoe Confederation (ACC) in the XVI congress meeting of Asian Canoe Confederation held in Samarkand. Hayat Durrani represented Pakistan as Pakistan National Canoeing team Leader in the ICF International Canoeing Championship held in July 2017 and July 2019 in Aronzo Di Cadore Italy.

== Programmes on TV ==
Durrani has performed in PTV serials as well a 13-episode series entitled Palay Shah, Palay Khan produced and directed by Sajjad Ahmad and assorted Pakistani plays, plus a documentary film based on the protection of the juniper forests. He appeared in Pakistan's first documentary on caving, Caves in Balochistan, produced and directed by Dur Mohammad Kassi of Ptv Quetta. He has also participated and still continues to participate in stage and live PTV shows as a caving and mountaineering expert.His latest sports show of 13 episode Aired on PTV Bolan from 30 October 2009. Hayatullah Khan Durrani is writer and host of the " Ptv Gemes Show " which is based on different Olympic and non-Olympic games. the show is produced by Sajjad Ahmed and Syed Gul Shah Bukhari of Ptv Quetta Center.

== Rescue services ==
An eleven-member team of the Pakistan Cave Research Association (PCRA) and Chiltan Adventure Association of Balochistan (CAAB) joined hands with teams from other countries to carry out search and rescue operations in Balakot, one of the worst-hit areas of the 8 October earth quake in Pakistan. The team also visited various relief camps established by the Pakistan Army in the area and provided relief goods and money to the affected people in Balakot and Shinkiari districts of Khyber Pakhtunkhwa. The PCRA and CAAB search and rescue team was led by Hayatullah Khan Durrani. The relief and rescue squad visited the Killi waham and other small mountain villages that were the most affected by the Ziarat earthquake of 29 October 2008. They camped in the Thorkhazai village for around five days and nights and distributed food, blankets and warm clothing among survivors outside their collapsed houses. In the recent past, a rescue squad incorporating CAAB, PCRA and Hayat Durrani Water Sports Academy (HDWSA)have recovered the dead bodies of a number of young boys from Thorkhazai Dame Loralai, Mannah Dame Duki, Khoshal Hotel Killi Hanna chashma and from Ghazaband Dame Kuchlak.

== Honours and awards ==
- Pakistan's Presidential Civil Award for "Pride of Performance" Pakistan 2006
- Man of the Expedition Award in Pak-UK Pakistan United Kingdom joint caving expedition 1991
- Man of the Expedition award in Pak-Iran Pakistan Iran joint mountaineering expedition 1992
- Man of the Expedition award in Pak-UK Pakistan United Kingdom joint caving & mountaineering expedition 1994
- Man of the Expedition award in Pak-UK Pakistan United Kingdom joint caving & mountaineering expedition 1997
- Man of the Expedition award in Pak-UK Pakistan United Kingdom joint caving & mountaineering expedition 2000
- Chief Organiser of Pak-UK Pakistan United Kingdom Cave Exploration cave Mapping / Rock-climbing training course 2006 (Pakistan).
- Juniper Defender Award Pakistan Preservation of Juniper forests and wildlife in Ziarat and Koh-i-Zarghoon region of Balochistan Pakistan 1984 to 2010.
- Caving Legend Award for Pak-UK Pakistan United Kingdom joint Caving & Speleological expeditions 1990 to 2018.
