= Qazi Muhammad Isa =

Pakistani politician

- قاضی محمد عیسیٰ
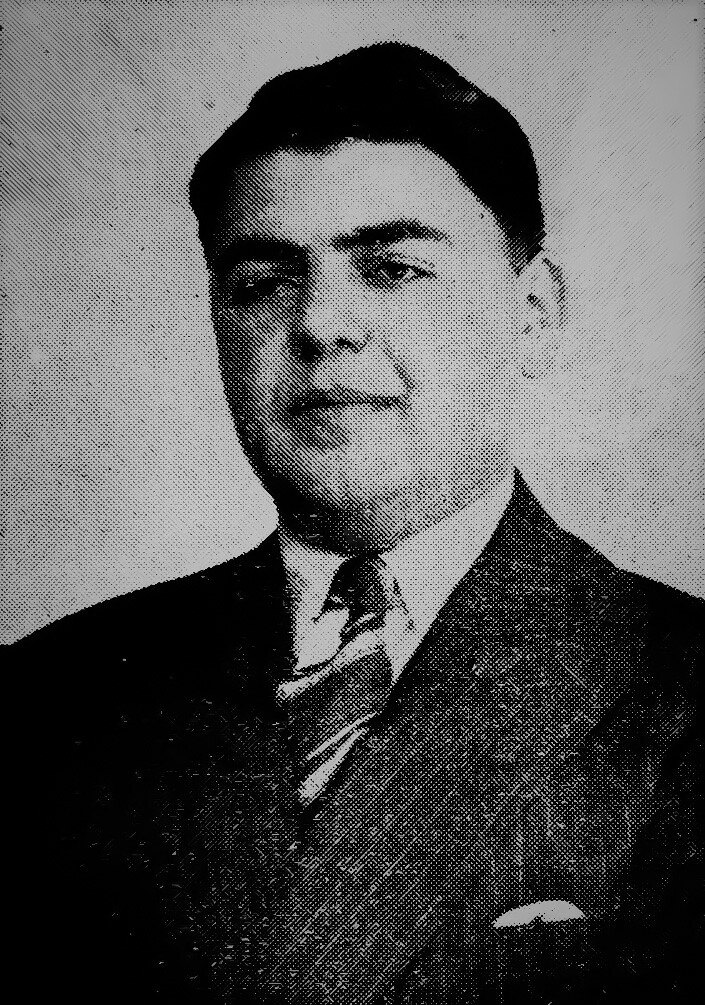
- Official portrait, c. 1940s
- Born: 17 July 1914; Pishin District, Baluchistan, British India
- Died: 19 June 1976 (aged 61); Quetta, Balochistan, Pakistan
- Known for: Being one of the Founding father of Pakistan; Lifelong member of Muslim League
- Children: Qazi Faez Isa (son) Qazi Azmat Isa (son); Qazi Anwar Kamal Isa (son) Ashraf Qazi

Qazi Muhammad Isa (Note: Urdu: قاضی محمد عیسیٰ) (17 July 1914 – 19 June 1976) was a Pakistani founding father, diplomat and statesman who led the Pakistan Movement in Balochistan. He was a signatory of the Lahore Resolution, representing the Balochistan Province.

== Early life and career ==
Qazi Muhammad Isa was born on 17 July 1914 in Pishin District, Balochistan. He received his basic education in Quetta. In 1933, he went to England for higher studies and received his law degree from Middle Temple, London. After returning to British India, he started practicing law in Bombay in 1938 where he first met Jinnah.

He participated in the formation of the first Muslim political party in what was to become Pakistan, (All-India Muslim league) Balochistan before 1947. He was from a Sunni Hazara of Sheikh Ali tribe, whose ancestors had migrated from Kandahar, Afghanistan to Pishin in Balochistan, Pakistan.

"After having been called to Bar in January 1939, he returned home and met Quaid-e-Azam Mohammad Ali Jinnah in Bombay. He was so impressed with his ideas and personality that on his return to Balochistan, he founded the All-India Muslim League in his province." He played a key role in the Pakistan Movement and was one of the trusted lieutenants of Muhammad Ali Jinnah. He was the youngest member of the Working Committee of the All-India Muslim League and as President of the Baluchistan Provincial Muslim League, he quickly organized the party throughout the province and played a key role in the 'Vote for Pakistan movement' and in the historical referendum of the then North-West Frontier Province. Qazi Essa travelled more than 300,000 miles to campaign for the Pakistan Movement between 1940 and 1947.

He represented Balochistan in the 1940 Lahore Resolution (Qarardad-e-Lahore قرارداد لاھور), commonly known as the Pakistan Resolution (قرارداد پاکستان Qarardad-e-Pakistan). His nephew, Ashraf Jehangir Qazi, has been a Pakistani High Commissioner in India, Pakistan's Permanent representative in UNO and UN Secretary General Special Representative in Iraq. Qazi Essa's son Qazi Faez Isa became Chief Justice of Balochistan High Court on 5 August 2009 and, later, took oath as a Judge of the Supreme Court of Pakistan on 5 September 2014. Qazi Faez Isa, later, served as 29th Chief Justice of Pakistan from 17 September 2023 to 25 October 2024.

Later, Qazi Muhammad Isa served as Ambassador of Pakistan to Brazil from 1951 to 1953. He also was a member of Pakistan delegations to the United Nations in 1950, 1954 and 1974. He was appointed member of the Committee on Minorities in the first Constituent Assembly of Pakistan.

== Commemorative postage stamp issued in 1990 ==
- Pakistan Postal Services issued a commemorative postage stamp in Qazi Muhammad Isa's honor in its 'Pioneers of Freedom' series in 1990.

== Death and legacy ==
Qazi Muhammad Isa died on 19 June 1976. Qazi Isa devotedly served the Muslim League for 37 years. Among his survivors are some notable Pakistani personalities.

== See also ==
- All-India Muslim League
- Balochistan
- Lahore Resolution
- Qazi Faez Isa (Justice of Supreme Court of Pakistan and a son of Qazi Mohammad Isa)
- Ashraf Jehangir Qazi (a nephew of Qazi Mohammad Isa)
- History of Quetta
- List of Hazara people

== Bibliography ==
- Francis Robinson (1997), The Muslims and Partition, History Today, Vol. 47
- Pakistan Journal of History and Culture, Volume 19, Pakistan: National Institute of Historical and Cultural Research, 1998, p. 124
