= Chiltan Adventurers Association Balochistan =

Non-profit association in Pakistan

Chiltan Adventurers Association Balochistan (Pak)
- Formation: 14 August 1948
- Type: Sports federation
- Headquarters: Quetta, Pakistan
- Members: UIS, OCC (UK), ACP (PAK), SCDL (Lebanon)
- Patron, Chairman: Hayatullah Khan Durrani Malik Abdul Rahim Baabai
- Website: http://www.caab.20m.com/

Chiltan Adventurers Association Balochistan (CAAB; Urdu: ۔چلتن ایڈ و ینچرذایسوسی ایشن بلوچستان) is a non-profit government adventure sports association in Balochistan, Pakistan. It consists of young boys and girls dedicated to the promotion of mountain adventure, sports climbing and associated sports. Its goals are to protect the new generation from dangerous drug abuse, by providing them with healthy sporting opportunities, organizing training camps, and national and provincial level event expeditions. 95% of all the players receiving training from CAAB are students of schools and colleges in Balochistan. The activities of the CAAB are financed by self-help, donations, and subscriptions of members and annual grant-in-aid from Balochistan Sports Control Board (BSCB) Quetta.

== History ==
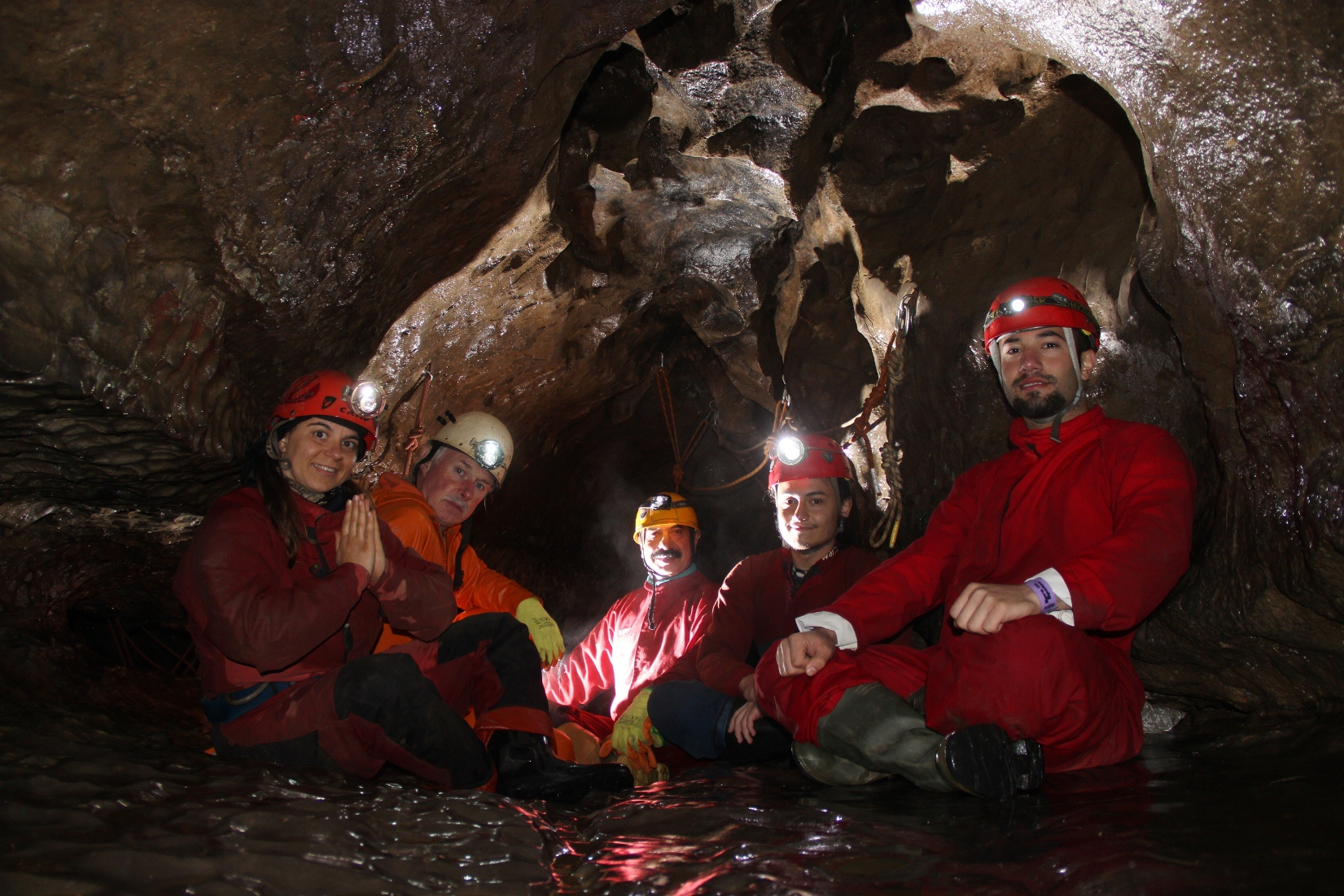
Hayatullah Khan Durrani and Pakistan caving team with Simon James Brooks in Yorkshire August 2016 Great Britain

The association is affiliated, at the international level, with the representative of the British C. R. Association 'Orpheus Caving Club' (UK), UIS (USA), Speleo Club Du liban (Lebanon) SCDL and at the national level with Alpine Club of Pakistan. The Pakistan Customs Collectorate of Quetta, in collaboration with the Chiltan Adventurers Association Balochistan, commemorated Pakistan Day by raising the national flag atop a mountain near Ziarat District.

== International Participation ==
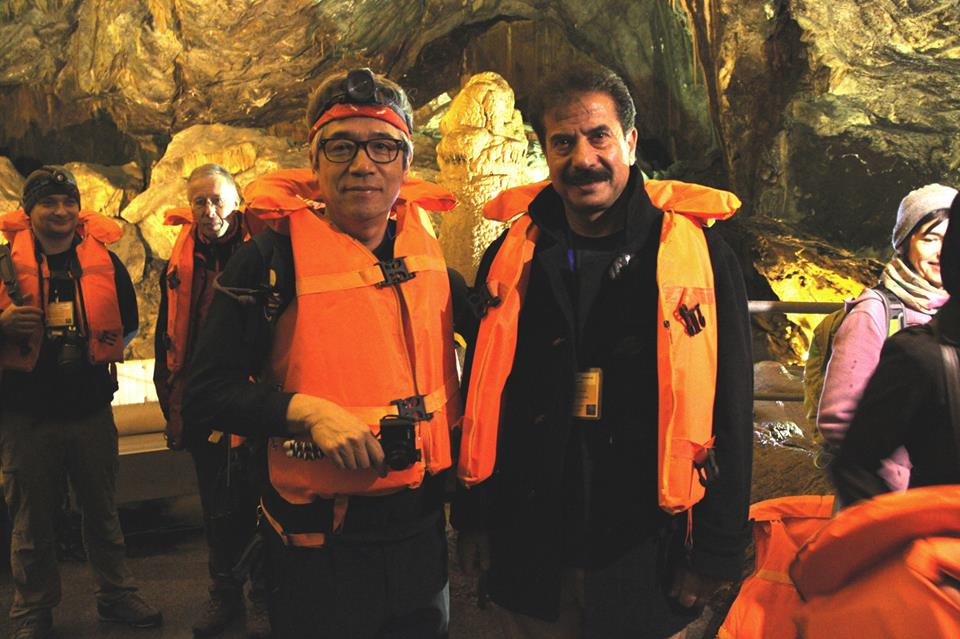
Hayatullah Khan Durrani and Prof:Kyung Sik Woo President Union of International Speleology (UIS) in Alisaddar Cave Hamadan Iran

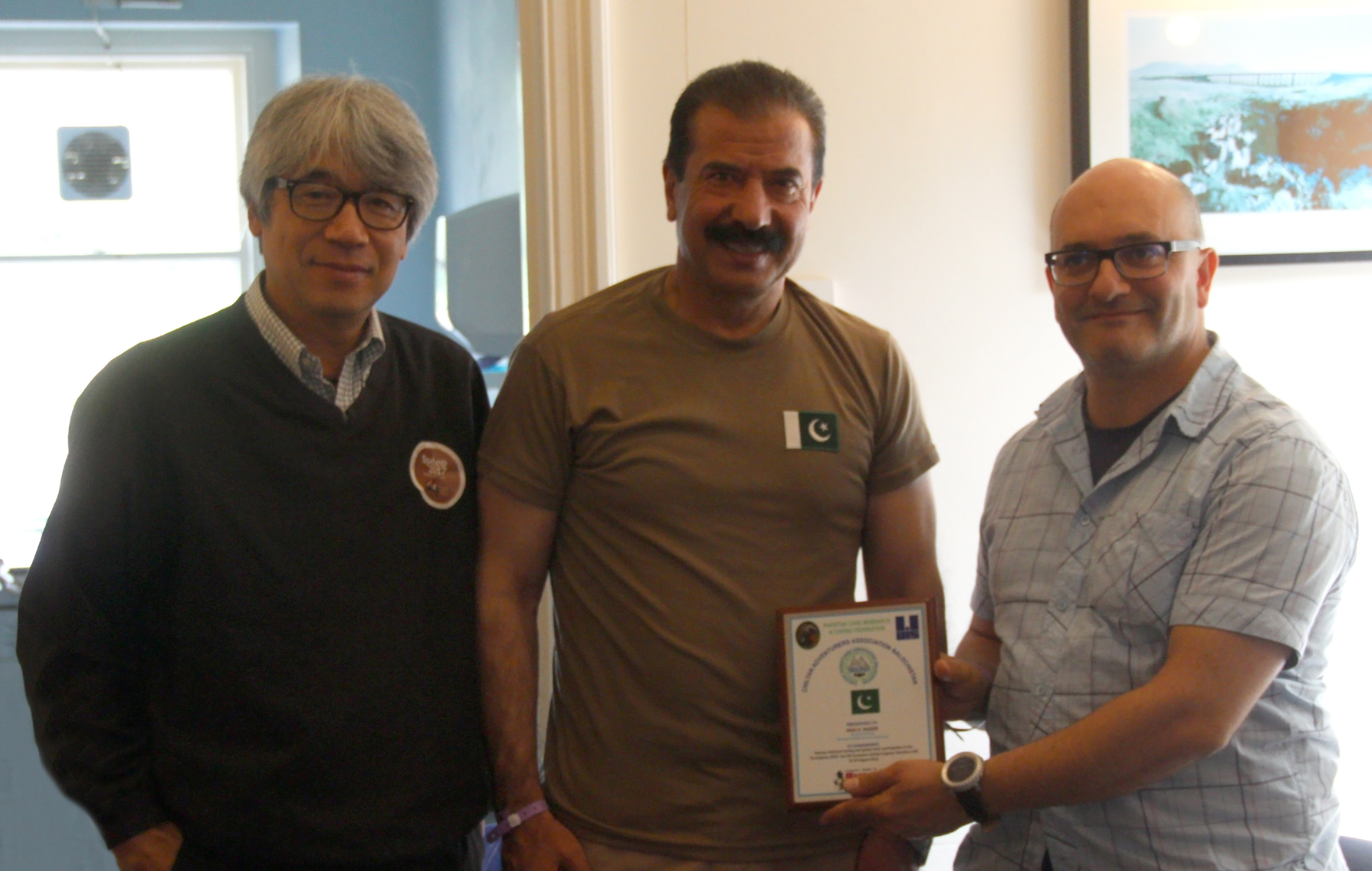
Hayatullah Khan Durrani with Dr. Kyung Sik Woo President UIS and Secretary UIS Fadi H Nader in York Shire Great Britain 2016

Pakistan National Speleo and caving team selected by Chiltan Adventurers Association Balochistan headed by Hayatullah Khan Durrani participated in the 1st and 2nd International Geosciences (Speleology) Congresses "in Iran as National Speleo and Caving team leader of Pakistan 2014 and 2016.The National Speleological and Caving Team of Pakistan headed by Hayatullah Khan Durrani (founder and Patron CAAB) as team leader Participate in the 5th European Speleo Caving (Eurospeleo Conference 2016) Yorkshire and 10th PAK-Britain Friendship Caving and Speleo Expedition 13 to 31 August 2016 under the patronage of BCA British Caving Association and Orpheus Caving Club Derby-shire United Kingdom. the President PCRCF also attended the Bureau meeting of International Union of Speleology held in Yorkshire,"

== Silver Jubilee of the Chiltan Adventurers ==
The celebrations of the silver jubilee of the Chiltan Adventurers Association Balochistan took place in October, 2010. The first and second phases of the competitive rock-climbing events for boys and girls, successfully ended here in the Mountains of Hanna Lake, Quetta. Fifty-five male and female mountaineers participated in the events.

Minister of Sport, Mir Shah Nawaz Khan Marri, and Minister of Prosecutions, Miss Rahillah Hameed Durrani (T.I.) were Guest of Honour of the Prize and Certificate distribution ceremony. Hayatullah Khan Durrani (Pride-of-Performance) founder of the Chiltan Adventures Association, chief organizer of the events and programmes, and Agha Faisal Shah President of the association, appraised the activities of the Chiltan Adventurers held over the past 26 years, 1984–2010.

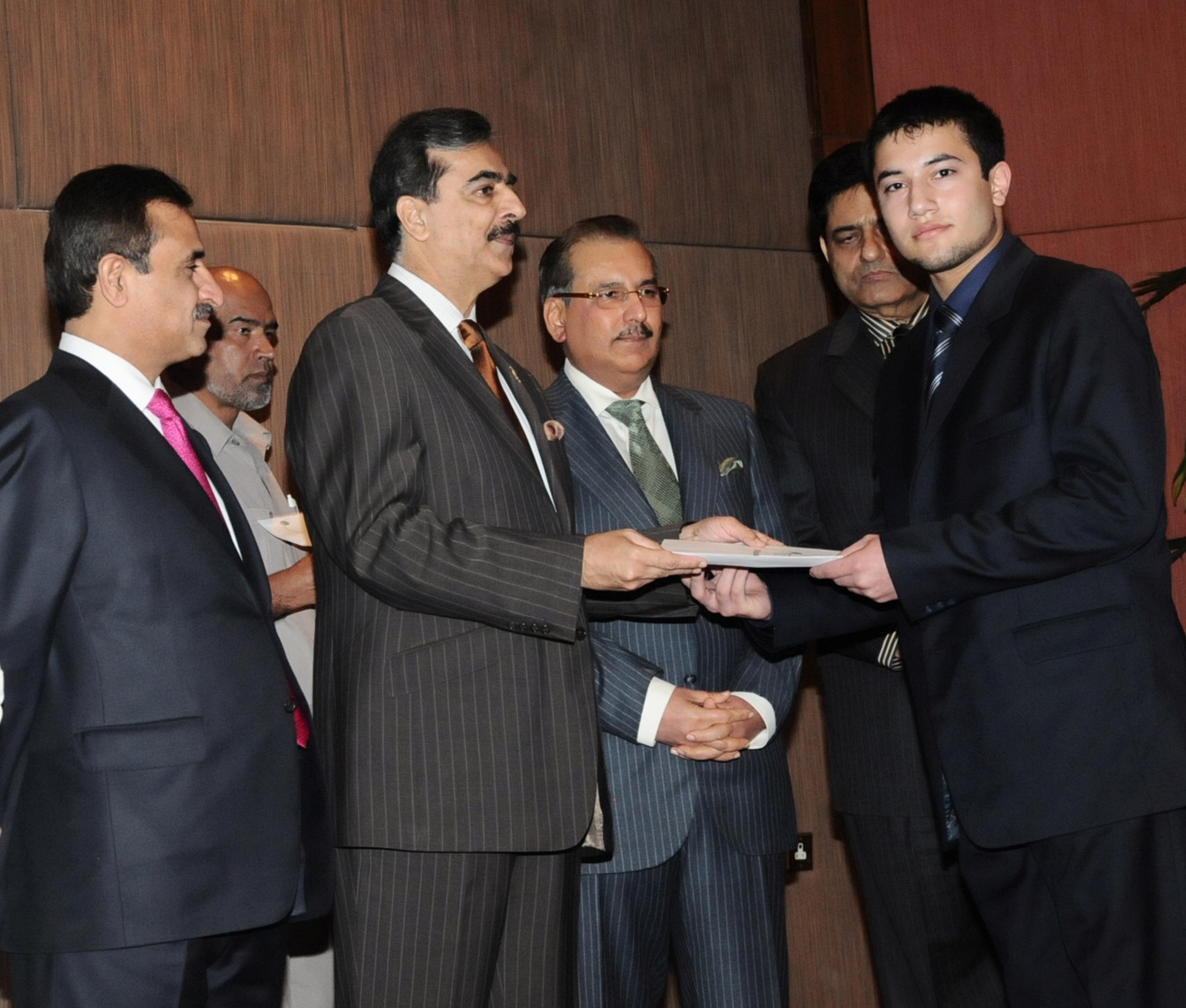
Abubakar Durrani receiving the Award from Prime Minister Mr. Yousaf Raza Gillani

== Prime Minister Award for Abubakar Durrani of Chiltan Adventurers ==
On 2 November 2010, Prime Minister of the Islamic Republic of Pakistan, Yousaf Raza Gillani, awarded the Youth adventurer and Canoeist Award to Mohammad Abubakar Durrani of the Chiltan Adventurers & HDWSA.

== K2 Base Camp Expedition ==
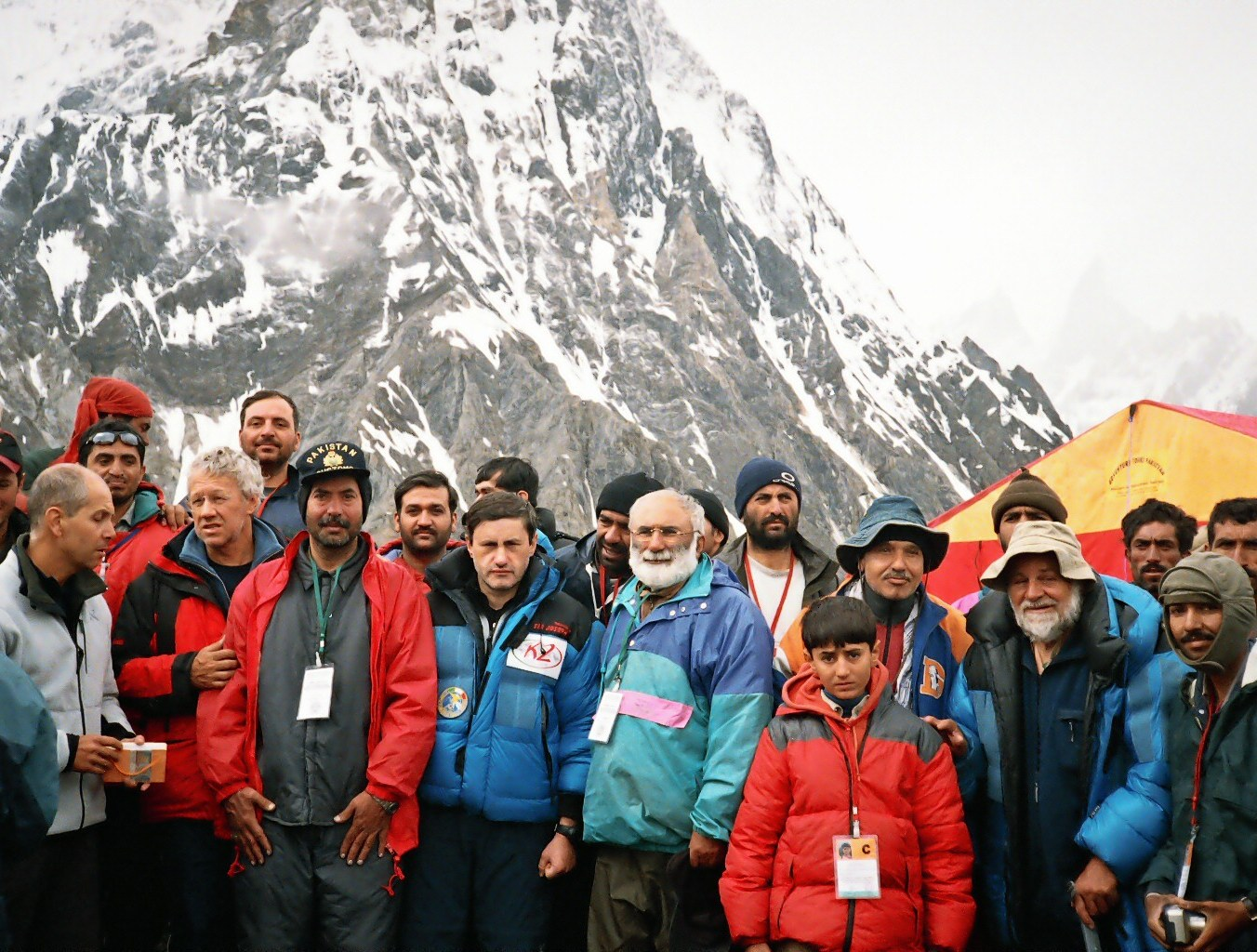
Group of Chiltan Adventurers with Lino Lacedelli and Gianni Alemanno at Concordia base camp 2004

After the successful Pakistani-Italian friendship expedition July 2004, on returning home by bus from Skardu to Rawalpindi, five mountaineers of this expedition were killed in a bus accident near Kohistan. They were Abdul Samad Khilji, Mohammad Ali Khan Mandokhail, Syed Thaimoor Shah, Nasibullah Khilji and Waqas Ahmed.

== Construction of CAAB Martyrs Monument ==
In memory of the five national heroes, who were killed in a bus accident after returning home from K-2 Expedition on 8 August 2004, Martyr's Monument was erected by the CAAB. The monument was constructed on the front of mission road roundabout opposite to the IG police office Quetta.

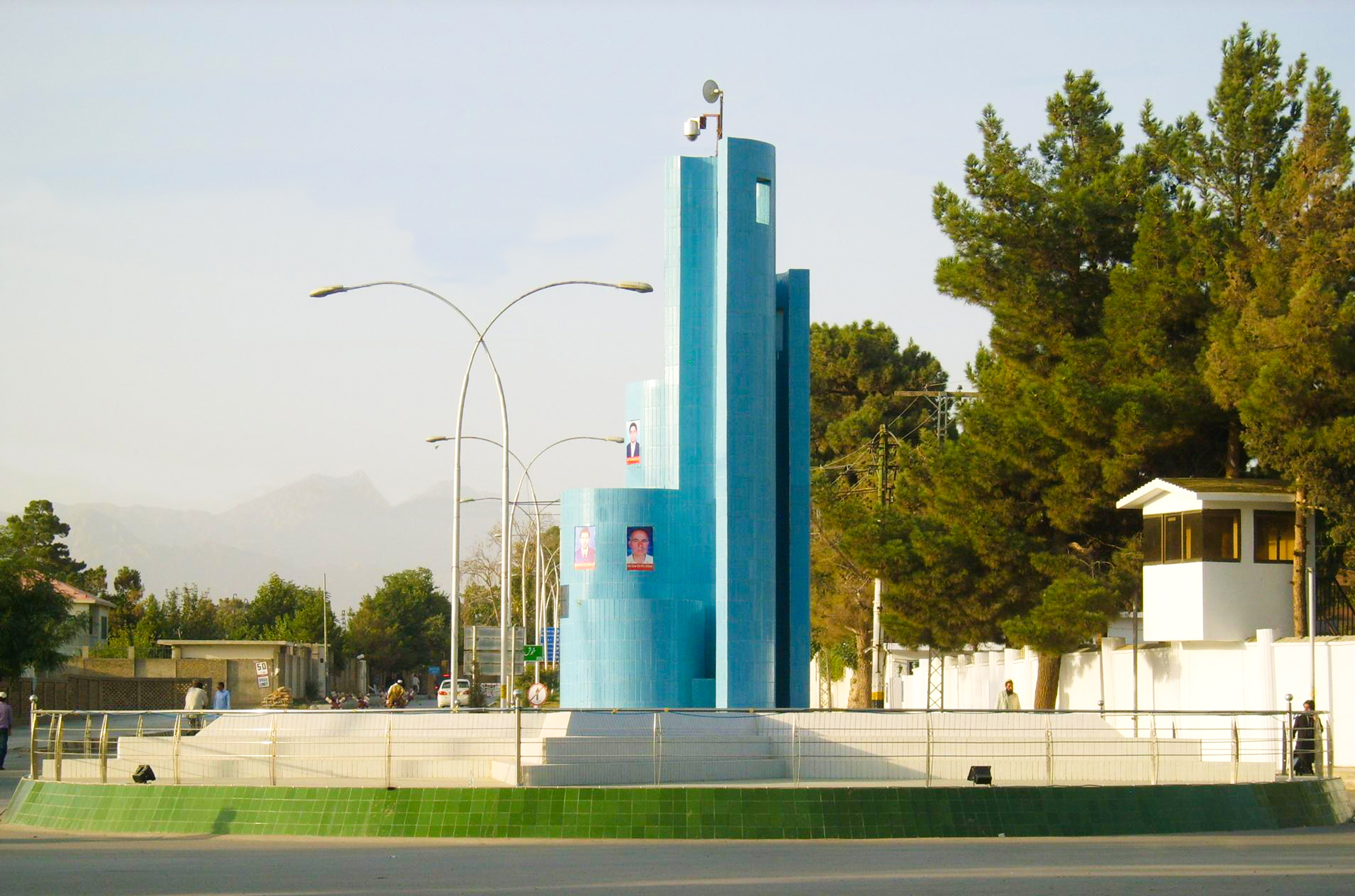
Monument of Chiltan Adventurers National Heroes and Martyrs

The place for the construction of this monument was allotted by the Quetta Cantonment Board. This monument was proposed and designed by the CAAB founder and patron Hayatullah Khan Durrani, Chairman Malik Abdul Rahim and Miss Rahillah Hameed Durrani, assisted by Arzgwani Architects of Quetta. Funds for the construction were allocated by Miss Rahillah Hameed Durrani, Provincial Minister and Patron of the Chiltan Adventurers.

== Juniper Defender Award ==
Silver Jubilee Juniper Defender Award (Certificate) by Government of Balochistan bestowed to Hayatullah Khan Durrani.

On 25 October 2010, The Government of Balochistan Sports, Environment and Youth Affairs Departments announced the Silver Jubilee "Juniper Defender Award" to Mr. Hayatullah Khan Durrani, for his long standing efforts since 1984.

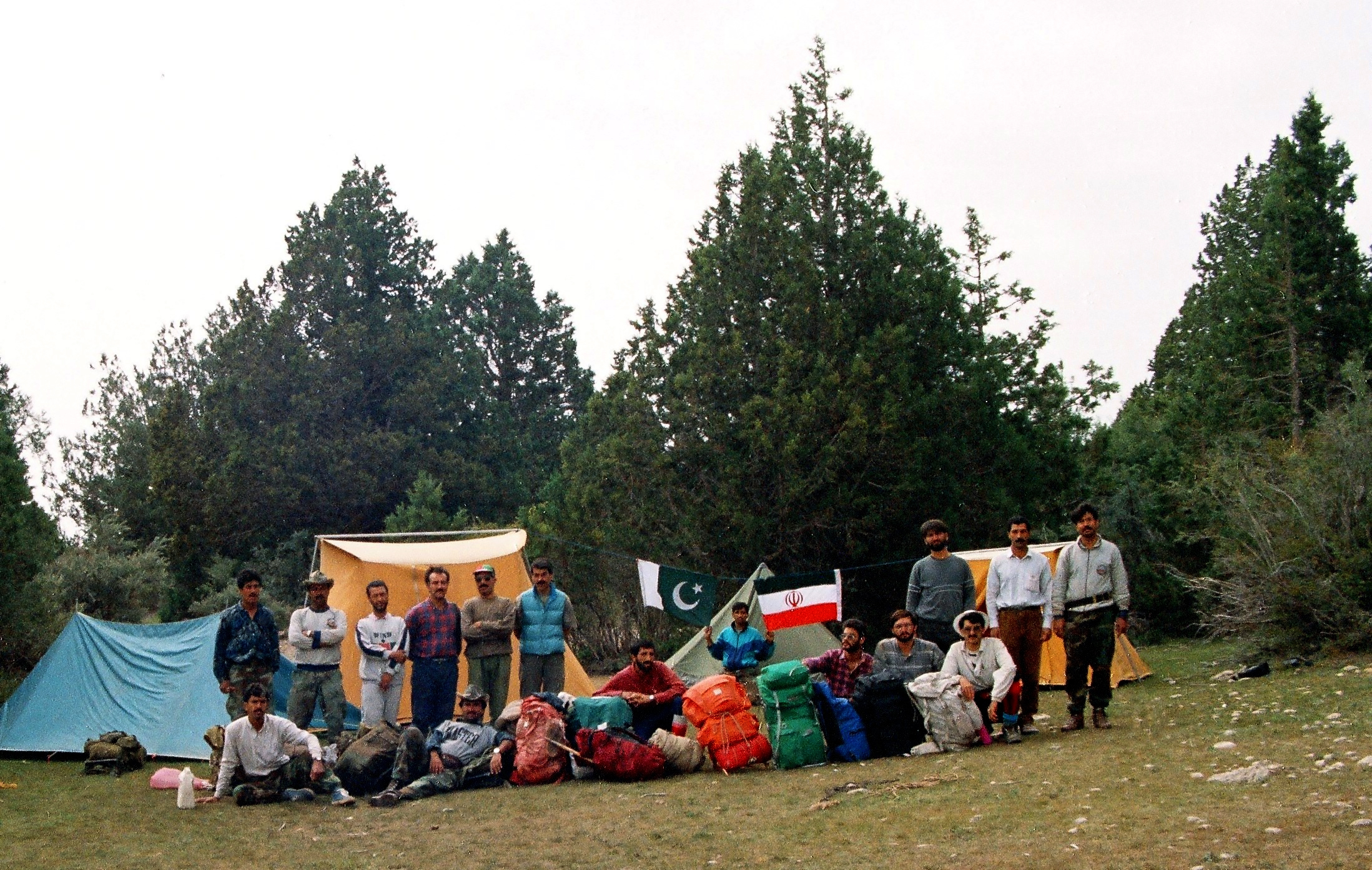
Pak-Iran Juniper Defenders and Mountaineers headed by Hayatullah Khan Durrani at base camp of Zarghoon Mount Balochistan 1991.

He is an environmental analyst for the preservation of the 3000-year-old World Heritage of Juniperus macropoda Juniper forests and wildlife in the Ziarat and Zarghoon Ghar regions of Balochistan Pakistan. He established the Juniper Defenders center at Chautair Valley of Ziarat, to educate people, create awareness and stop the destruction of this valuable heritage and its endangered species.
