= Bangulzai Hills =

The Bangulzai Hills are a low mountain range located in the Kalat District of Balochistan Province, in southwestern Pakistan.

== See also ==
- Geography of Balochistan, Pakistan
