= Army Sports Complex =

Military sports complex in Rawalpindi, Pakistan

- Location: Rawalpindi Cantonment, Rawalpindi, Pakistan
- Owner: Pakistan Army
- Surface: Grass

Tenant
- Pakistan Army F.C.

The Army Sports Complex is a multi-sport complex operated by the Pakistan Army near Saddar in Rawalpindi Cantonment, Pakistan. It has hosted association football and combat-sport competitions and has served as a training centre for Pakistan Army athletes and sportsmen. The complex's football ground is known as Army Stadium and has served as the home venue of Pakistan Army F.C.

== Facilities ==
=== Combat sports ===
The complex was one of the competition venues for the 2004 South Asian Games. Competitions in karate, taekwondo and kabaddi were staged at the Army Sports Complex.

The complex has repeatedly accommodated training camps organised by the Pakistan Boxing Federation. The boxing facilities include a gym situated in the athletes' boarding area, while players' accommodation is located inside the complex.

The complex has also been used for karate and taekwondo training.

=== Football ===
The complex's football ground, the Army Stadium, has served as a home venue for Pakistan Army F.C.. It hosted the final of the 2005 National Challenge Cup.

It has hosted several Pakistan Premier League matches.

=== Athletics ground ===
Army Stadium has historically been used for athletics training. During the 1950s and 1960s, Brigadier Cuthbert Rodham, president of the Army Sports Control Board, oversaw the training of Army athletes at the stadium.

World Athletics has listed a separate Army athletics facility facility named as GHQ Army Athletics Track. Its synthetic running surface received certification on 1 August 2018, with the certification listed as valid until March 2024.

=== Army Hockey Stadium ===
The Army Hockey Stadium is an artificial-turf field hockey venue in Rawalpindi. The venue has also been used for Pakistan national hockey team selection and training. In November 2019, the stadium hosted matches between the Pakistan Army and British Army women's hockey teams.

In addition to sporting events, Army Hockey Stadium has been used for official military ceremonies, including the 2016 transfer of command from General Raheel Sharif to General Qamar Javed Bajwa.

=== Army Hockey Stadium ===
The Army Hockey Stadium is a field hockey venue within the Pakistan Army's sports facilities in Rawalpindi. The stadium has also been used for domestic competitions and national-team activities. The venue has also been used for Pakistan national hockey team selection and training.

In 1962, it hosted the third Test of a five-match series between Pakistan and Kenya on 12 December. Pakistan won the match 1–0. During the Netherlands national team's tour of Pakistan in 1967, a Rawalpindi representative side held the Dutch team to a goalless draw at Army Stadium.

The venue continued to be used for major hockey fixtures in later decades. On 1 March 1998, Pakistan defeated India 2–1 at Army Stadium in Rawalpindi during the Pakistan leg of their bilateral Test series.

The hockey facilities underwent development in the early 2000s. In February 2005, the Pakistan Hockey Federation announced that the Aga Khan Gold Cup would be held at Army Hockey Stadium, with the tournament having been postponed after rain delayed the laying of artificial turf. Later that year, the Pakistan Sports Board replaced the synthetic hockey turf at the stadium. The Aga Khan Gold Cup was subsequently staged at Army Hockey Stadium in March, with its semifinals and final played at the venue. On 26 February 2006, Army Hockey Stadium hosted the sixth and final Test of another bilateral series between Pakistan and India.

In November 2019, the stadium hosted matches between the Pakistan Army and British Army women's hockey teams.

In addition to sporting events, Army Hockey Stadium has been used for official military ceremonies, including the 2016 transfer of command from General Raheel Sharif to General Qamar Javed Bajwa.

=== Army Sports Gymnasium ===
The Army Sports Gymnasium is an indoor sports venue in Rawalpindi administered in connection with the Pakistan Army Sports Directorate. In November 2010, the gymnasium hosted the ninth National Men's Netball Championship.

The Pakistan Swimming Federation has also used Army Sports Gymnasium as its administrative address.

== See also ==
- Army Stadium, Rawalpindi
- Pindi Club Ground
- Pakistan Army F.C.
- List of stadiums in Pakistan
