= STDC =

STDC may refer to:

- Sha Tin District Council, the district council for the Sha Tin District in Hong Kong
- Sindh Tourism Development Corporation, an organization of the Government of Sindh, Pakistan
- South Tees Development Corporation, the first Mayoral Development Corporation outside Greater London to be established under the Cities and Local Government Devolution Act 2016
