= Army Stadium, Rawalpindi =

Stadium in Rawalpindi, Pakistan

Coordinates: 33°35′22.40″N 73°3′15.59″E

Army Stadium
- ورزشگاه فوج
- Interactive map of Army Stadium
- Location: Rawalpindi, Pakistan
- Owner: Pakistan Army
- Capacity: 7,000
- Surface: Grass

Tenant
- Pakistan Army FC

Army Stadium is an association football stadium in Rawalpindi, Pakistan with 7,000 seats. The stadium is part of the wider Army Sports Complex. It is the home of the Pakistan Army FC.

== History ==
Army Stadium has historically formed part of the Pakistan Army's sports infrastructure in Rawalpindi. During the 1950s and 1960s, Brigadier Cuthbert Rodham, president of the Army Sports Control Board, oversaw the training of Army athletes at the stadium.

From 1963 till 1967, the stadium was used as venue for the All-Pakistan Mohammad Ali Bogra Memorial Football Tournament, an invitational tournament named after deceased Mohammad Ali Bogra, and organised by Rawalpindi based East-West Pakistan Union Football Club committee. The tournament regularly featured prominent Pakistan figures attending such as Ayub Khan. The stadium featured all four editions of the tournament in 1963, 1964, 1966, and 1967.

On 3 June 1972, the stadium hosted the 1972 Summer Olympics Asian Qualifiers match between Iran and North Korea.

On 3 January 1983, Army Stadium hosted a friendly match between the Pakistan national team and the touring German South-West Region team, the match ended in a 0–3 loss for Pakistan. The second match between Pakistan and the German team was held at KMC Stadium, Karachi.

In 2004, Army Stadium was among the venues of the inaugural 2004 National A Division Football League. The stadium was also one of the football venues used during the 2004 South Asian Games. It staged group-stage fixtures in the tournament. It hosted the final of the 2005 National Challenge Cup.

Army Stadium continued as Pakistan Army's home ground in subsequent Pakistan Premier League seasons.

== Gallery ==
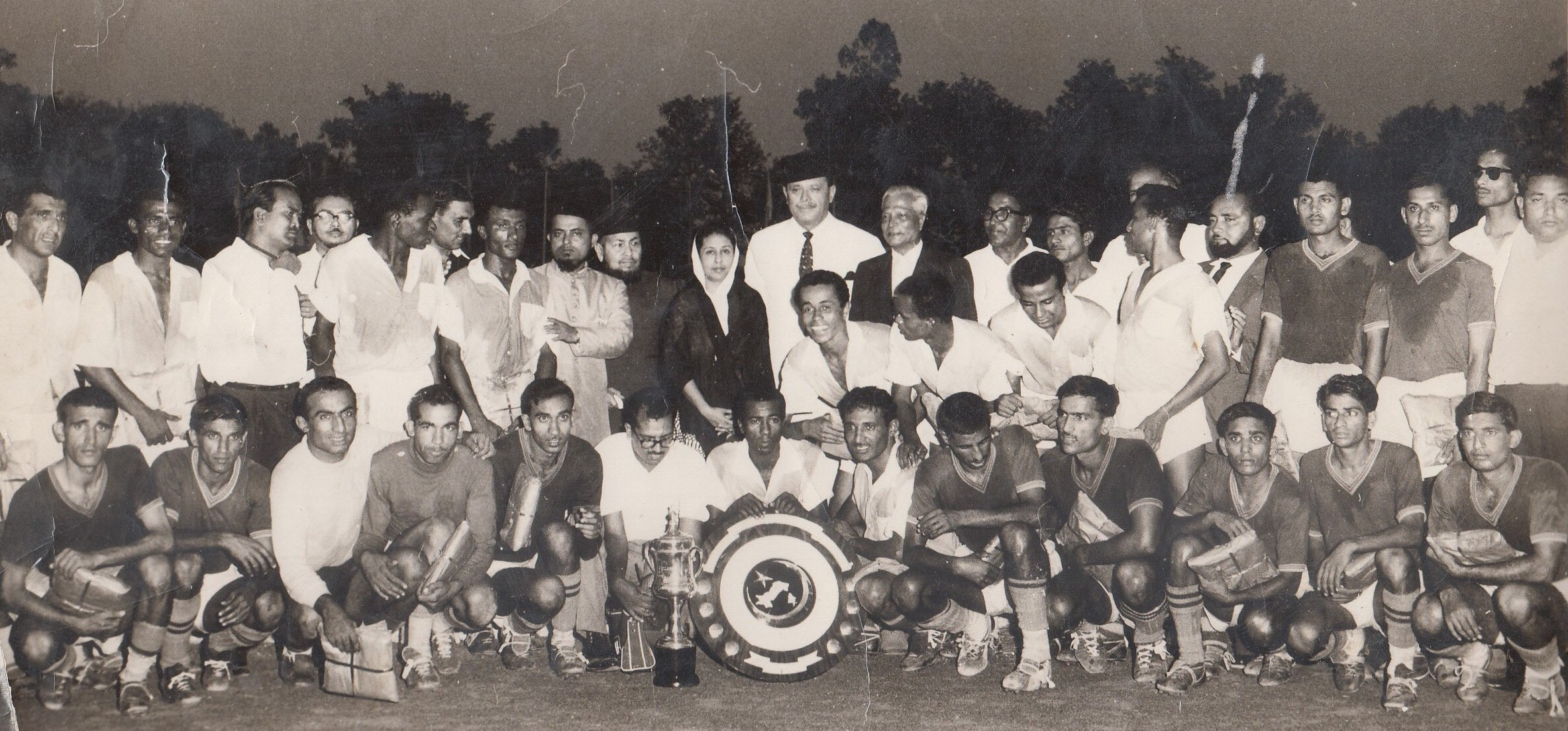
_{Victoria Sporting Club and Pakistan Air Force during the 1963 Mohammad Ali Bogra Tournament final at Army Stadium}

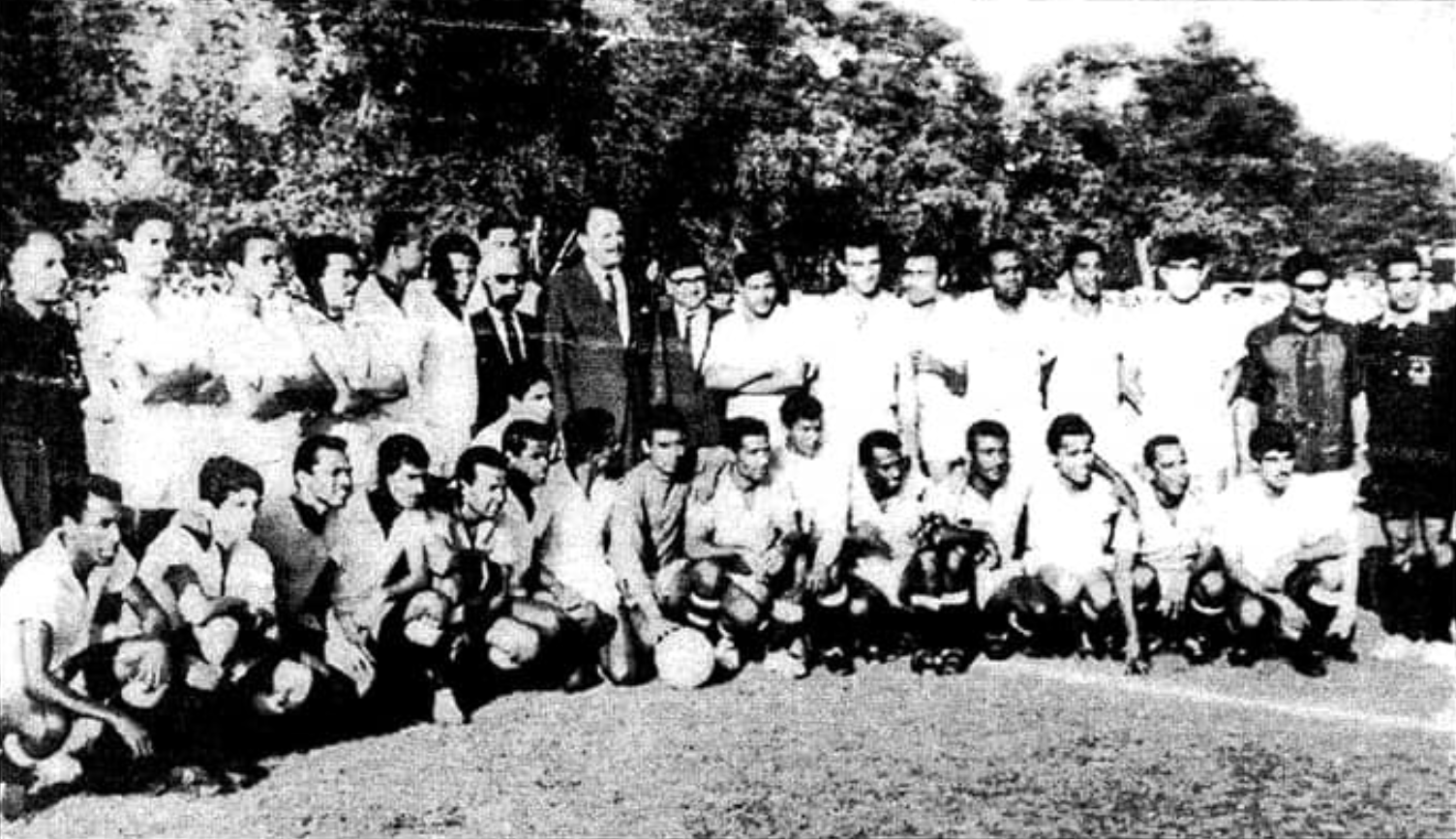
_{Dhaka Wanderers and Dhaka Mohammedan during the 1966 Mohammad Ali Bogra Tournament final at Army Stadium}

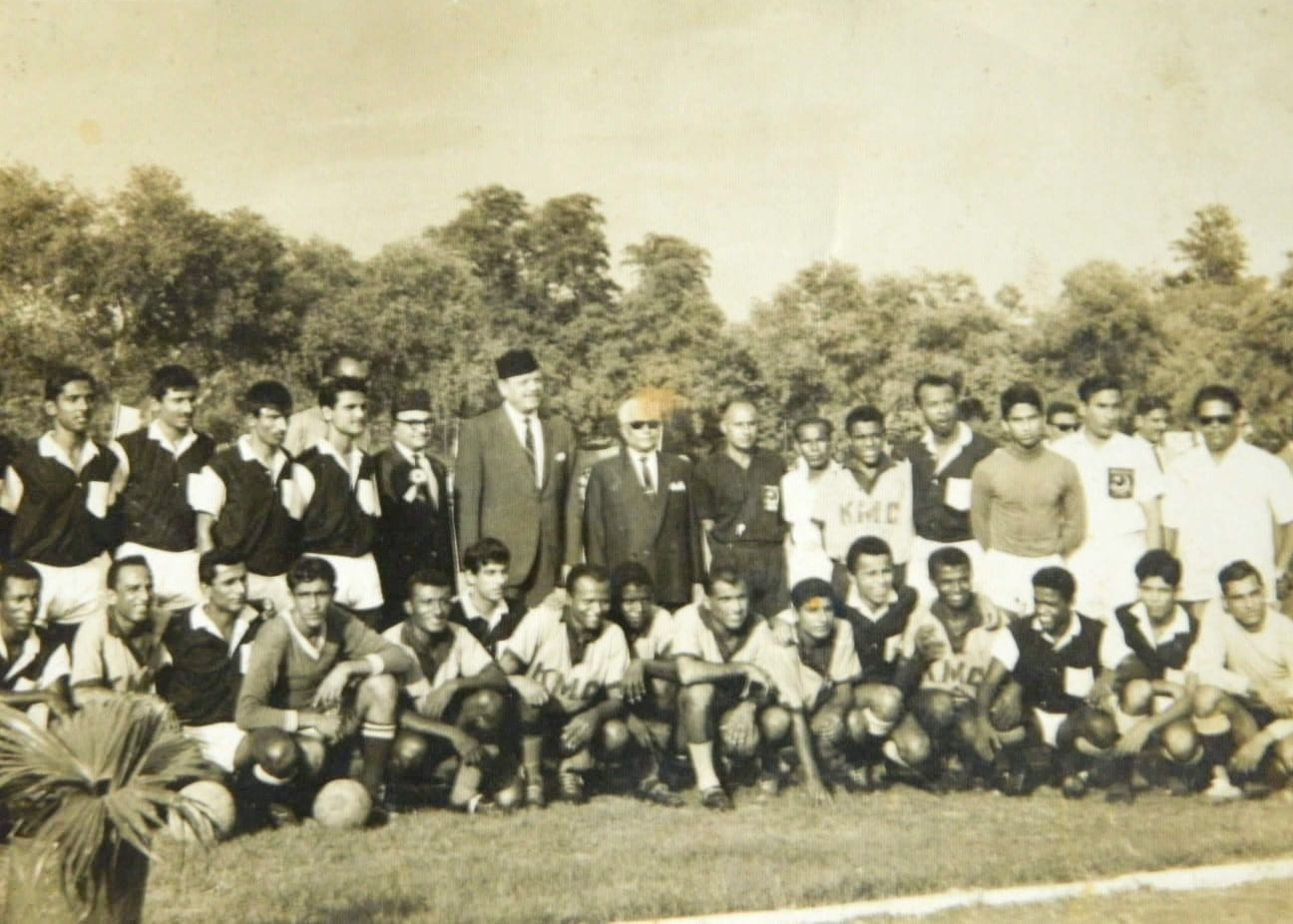
_{KMC and Dhaka Mohammedan during the 1967 Mohammad Ali Bogra Tournament final at Army Stadium}

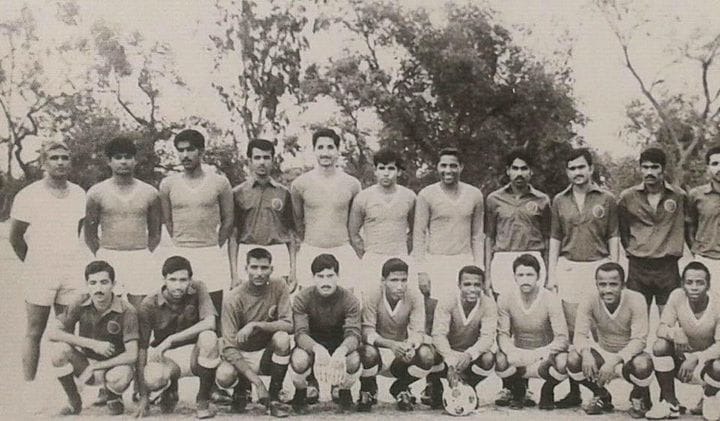
_{Pakistan national football team with POF Wah Cantt team in Army Stadium in 1973}
