= Rooplo Kolhi Resort =

Resort hotel in Pakistan

Rooplo KolResort, Nagarparkar
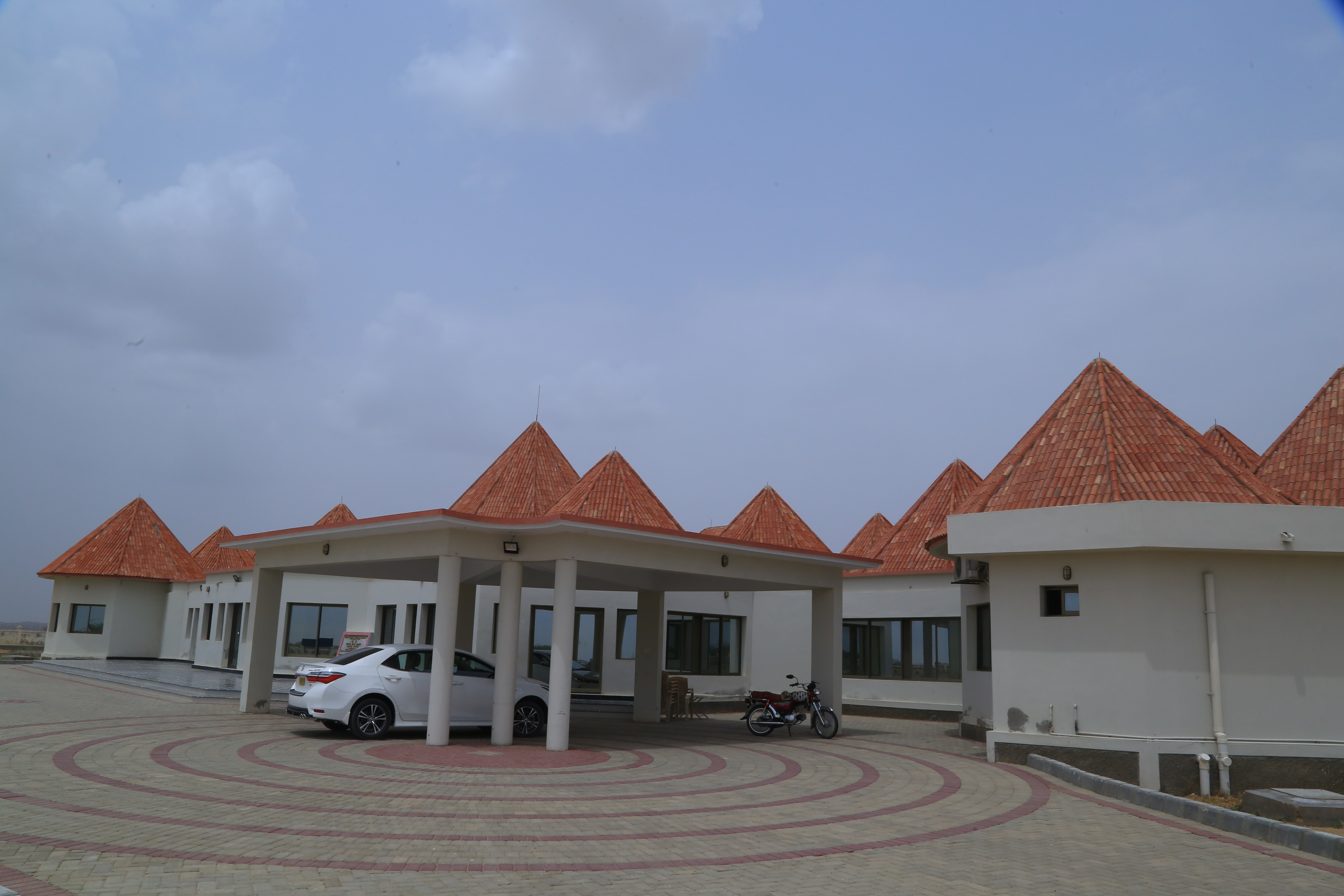
- Rooplo Kolhi Resort, Nagarparkar
- Interactive map of the Rooplo KolResort, Nagarparkar area

General information
- Location: Nagarparkar, Sindh, Pakistan
- Owner: Sindh Tourism Development Corporation

Other information
- Number of rooms: 18 Super Deluxe and Deluxe Rooms

Website
- stdc.gos.pk

Rooplo Kolhi Resort (Sindhi: روپلو ڪولھي رزارٽ) is a resort in Nagarparkar, Sindh, Pakistan, owned by the Sindh Tourism Development Corporation situated at Islamkot Nagarparkar Road. The resort has a total 18 airconditioned, non-airconditioned, and single rooms.

== About the name ==
Rooplo Kolhi was a freedom fighter, who fought for the rights of Sindhi people and Karoonjhar Mountains against the British Raj. Sindh Minister for Culture, Tourism & Antiquities, Syed Sardar Ali Shah passed a bill in Provincial Assembly of Sindh and initiated the resort establishment on the hero of the Sindhi people.

== Establishment ==
Rooplo Kolhi Resort is established by Sindh Tourism Development Corporation and inaugurated on 26 August 2017.

== Location ==
Resort is situated near Nagarparkar on Islamkot Nagarparkar Road, Sindh, Pakistan.

== Tourist attractions ==
Rooplo Kolhi Resort is surrounded by Karoonjhar Mountains and ancient heritage like old temples, mosques. Nagarparkar is a hub of cultural tourism with a variety of traditional dresses, Thari dance and music. Rain brings here greenery on deserts and mountains. Historical Jain temples which are centuries old can be visited.

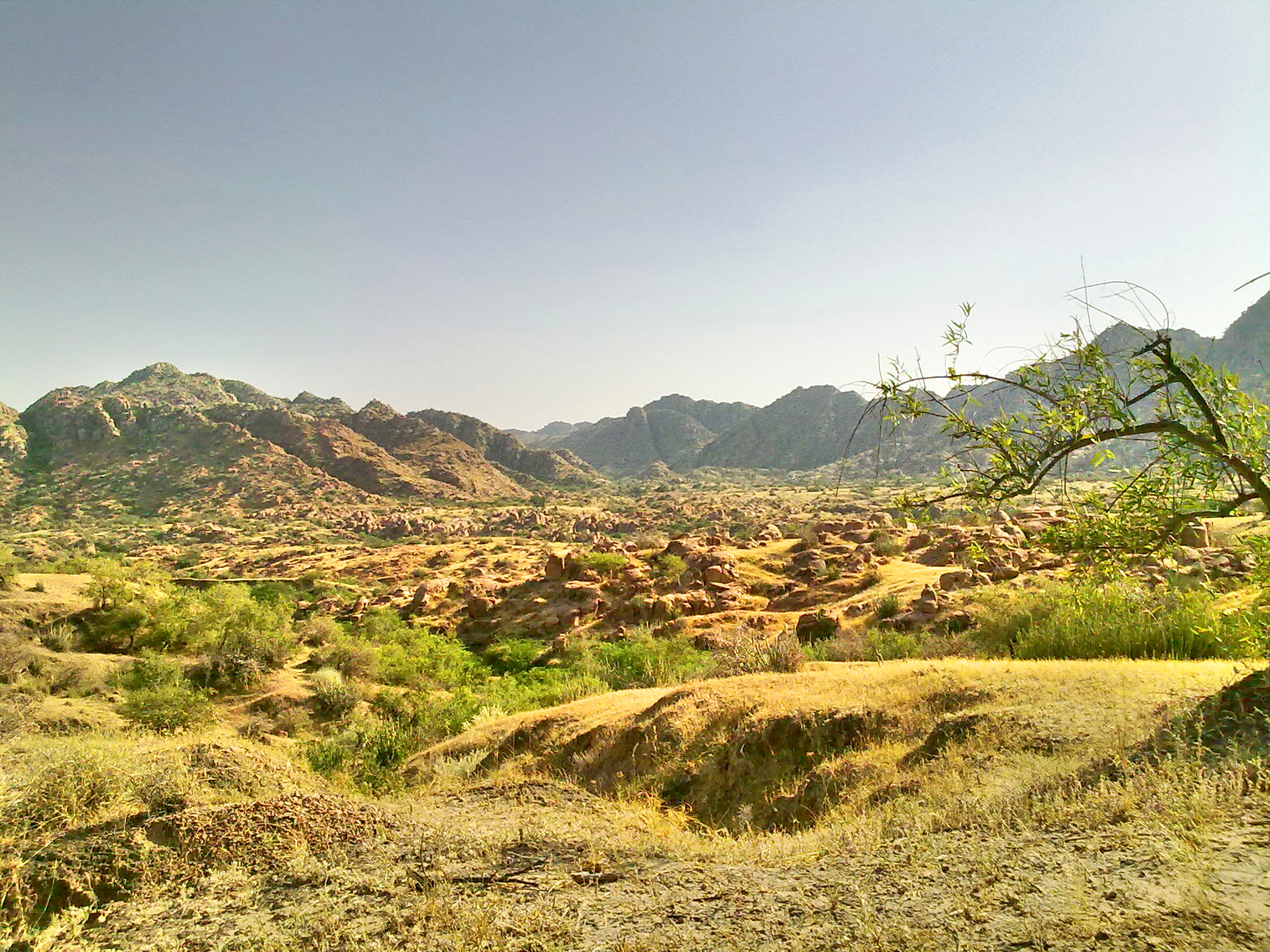
Karoonjhar mountains

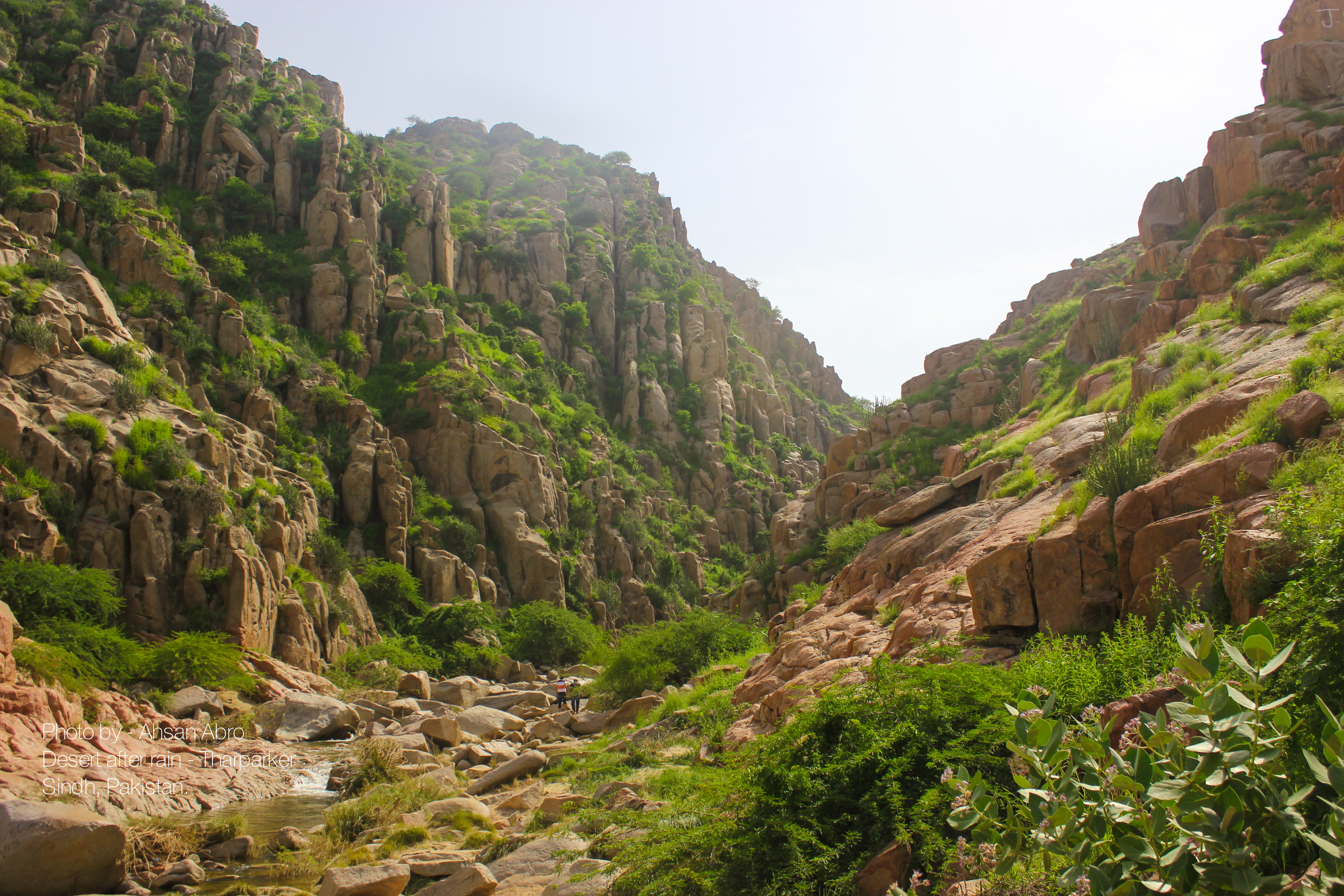
Karoonjhar after raining

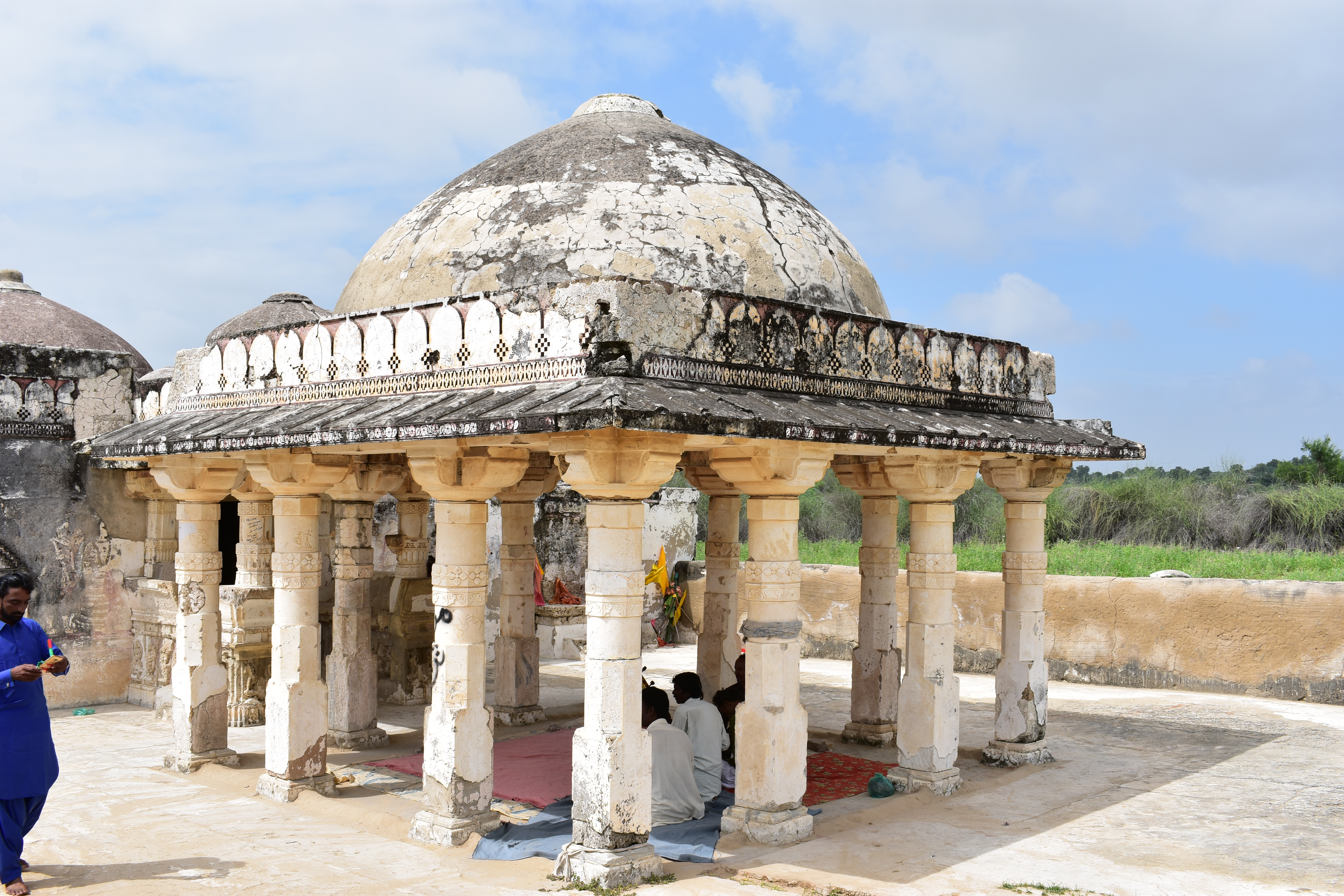
Gori temple

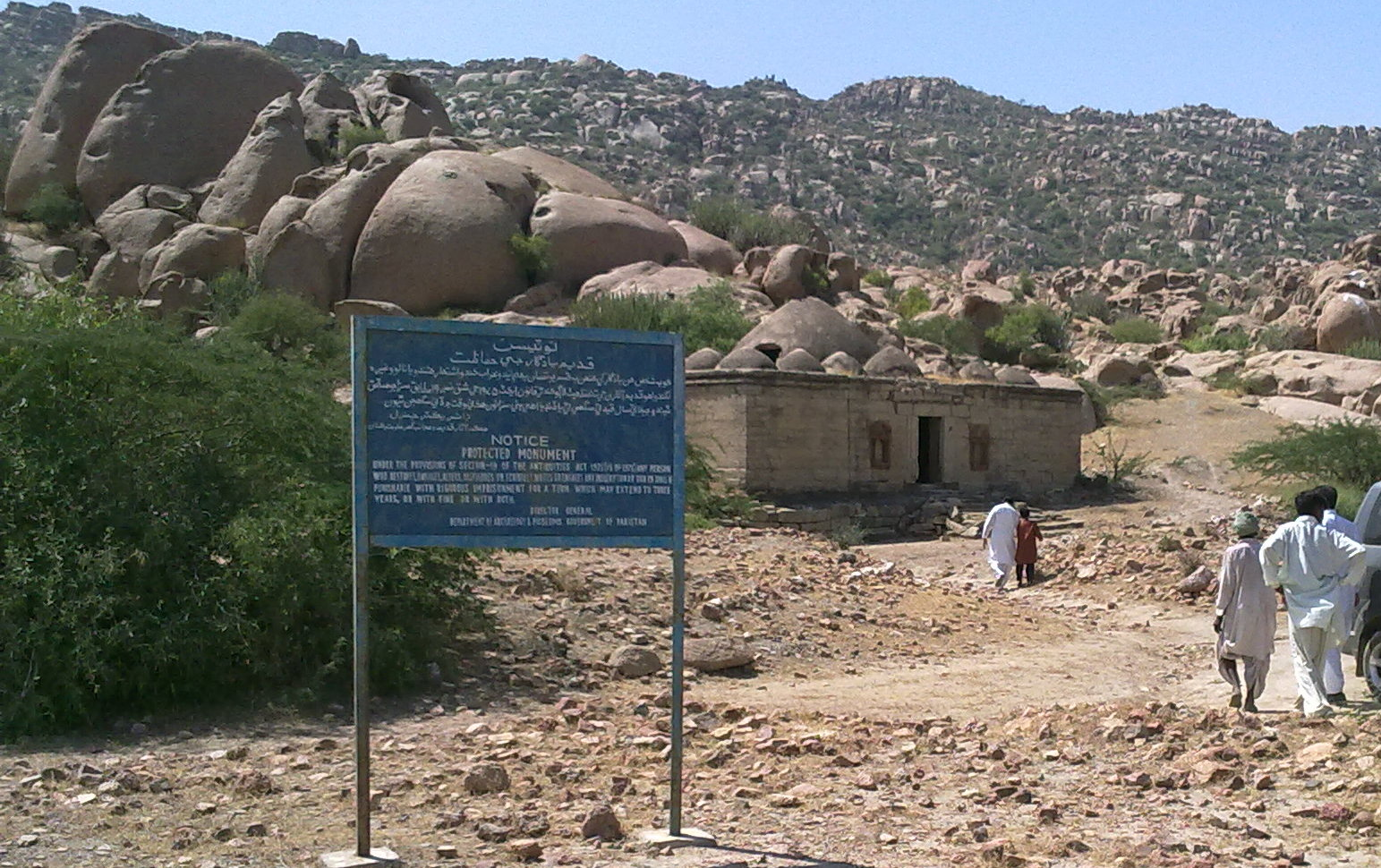
Jain Temple at Karoonjhar Mountains

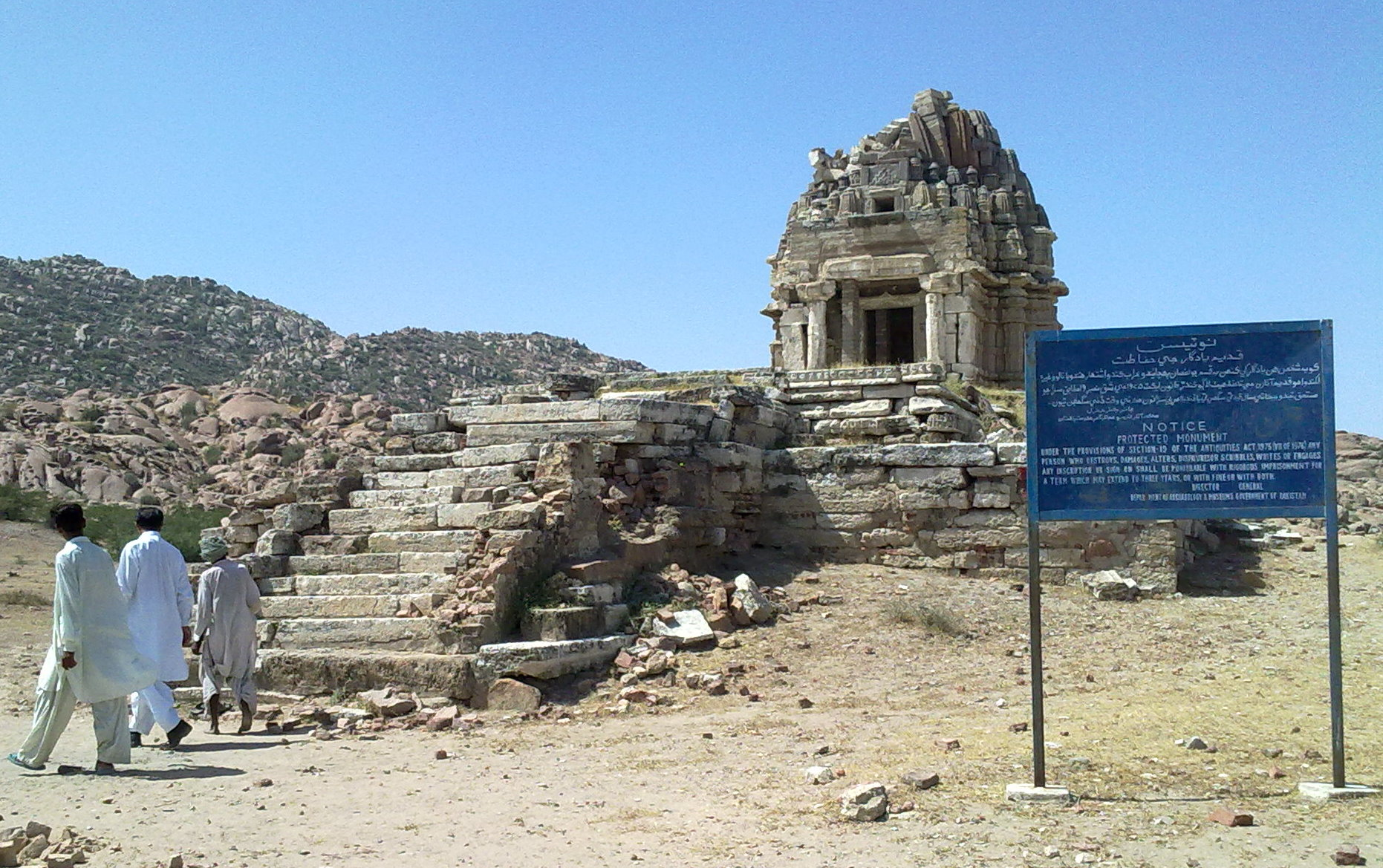
Jain Temple at Karoonjhar Mountains

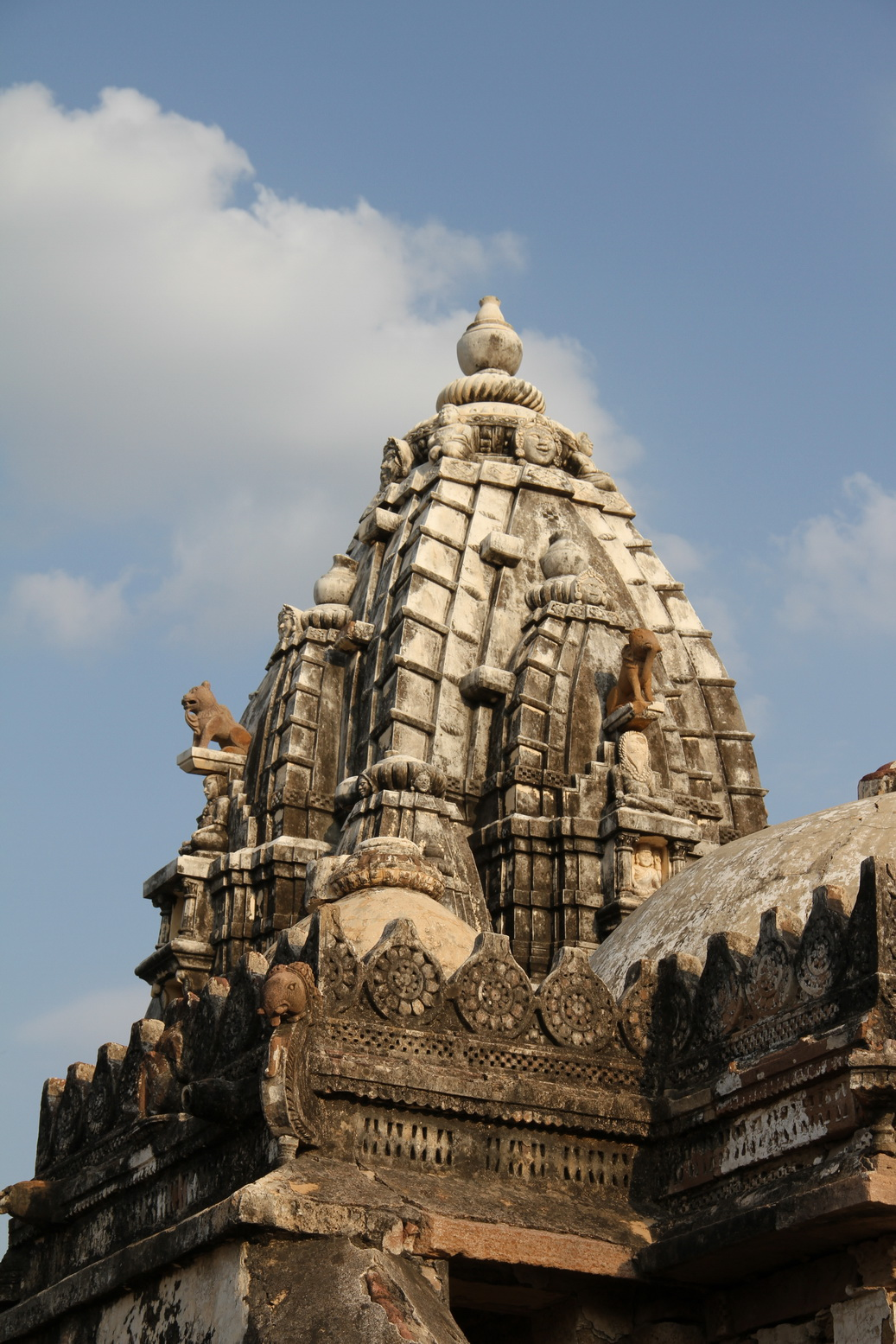
Shikhar of Nagarparkar Bazaar Temple

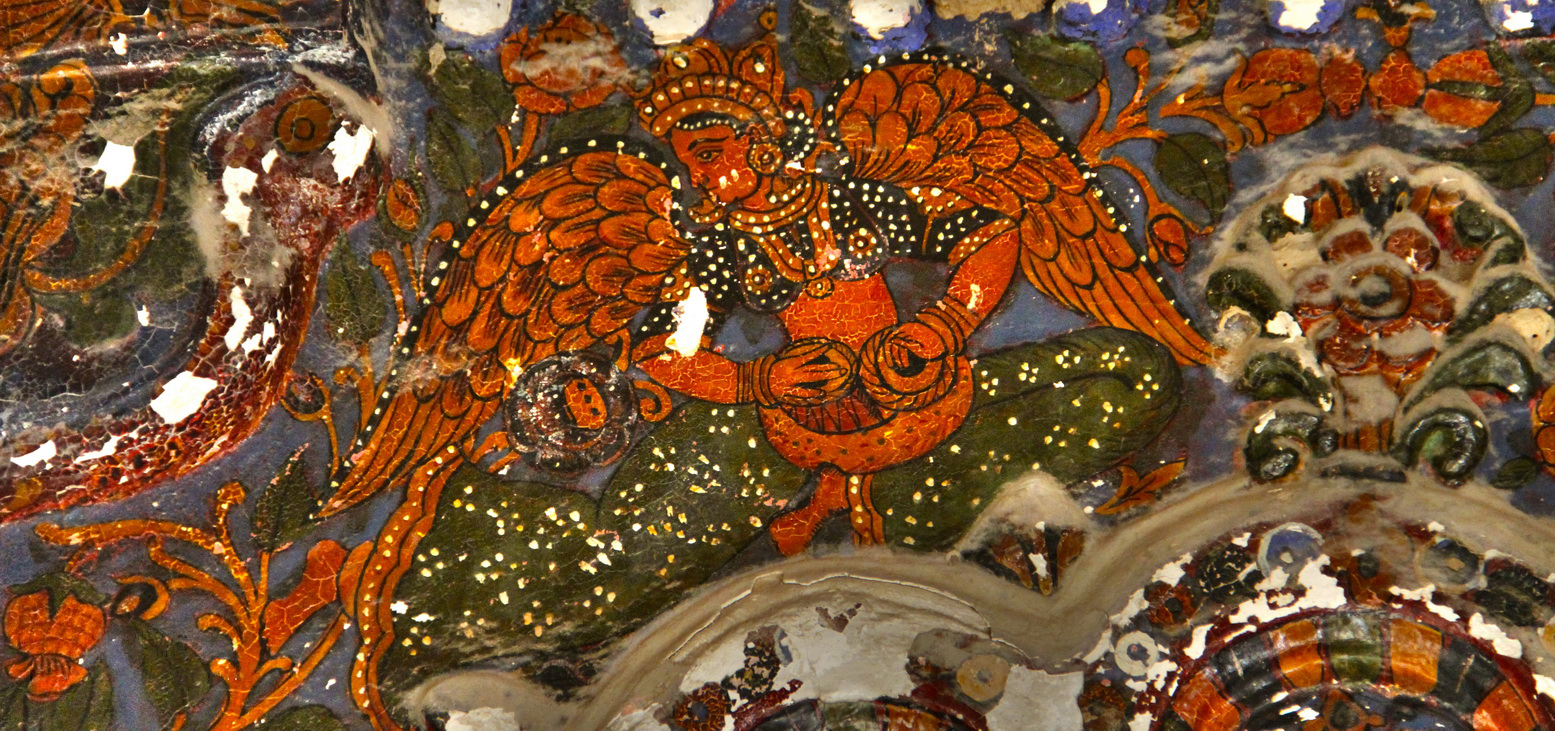
Paintings at the Bazaar Temple

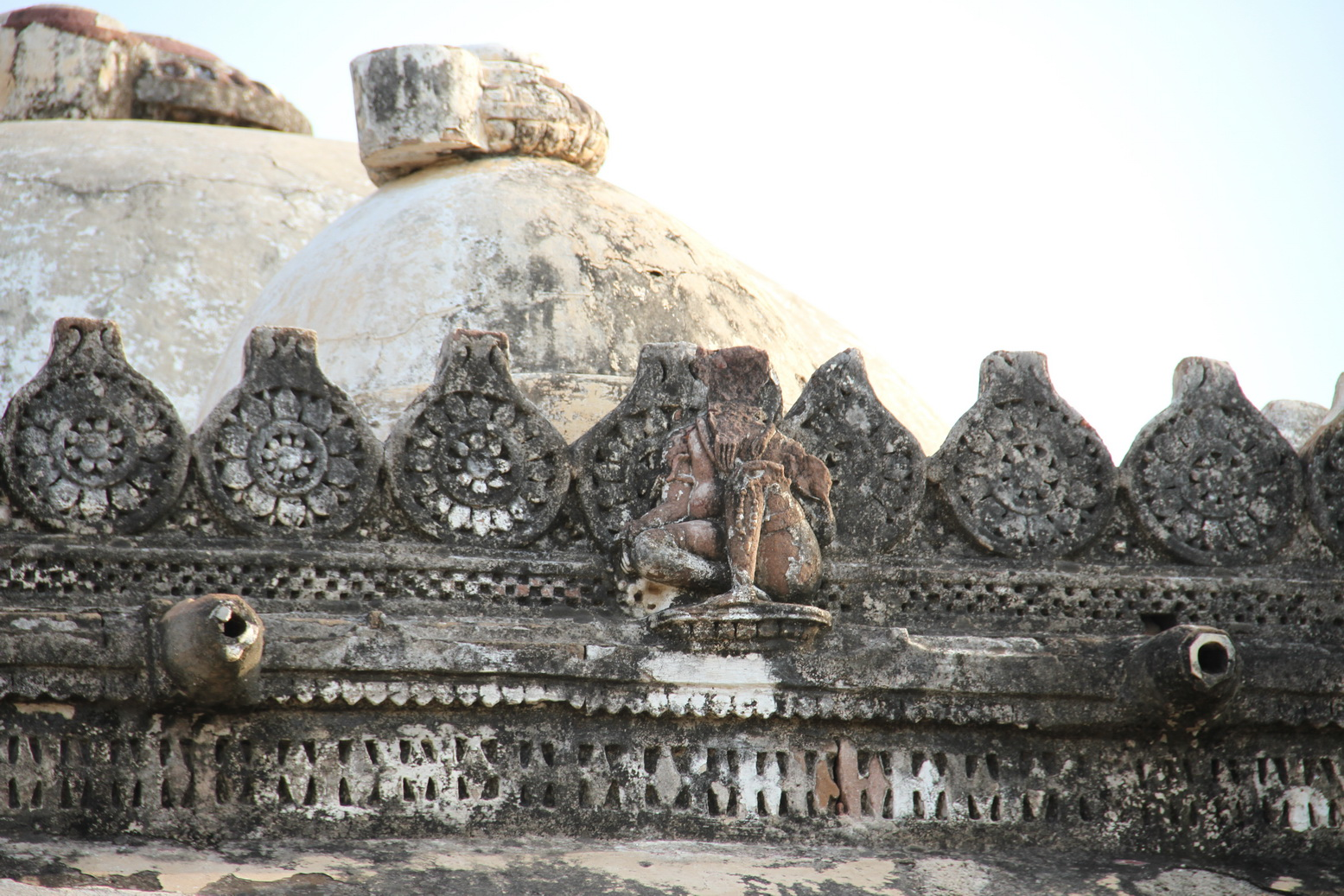
Architectural details at Nagarparkar Jain Temples

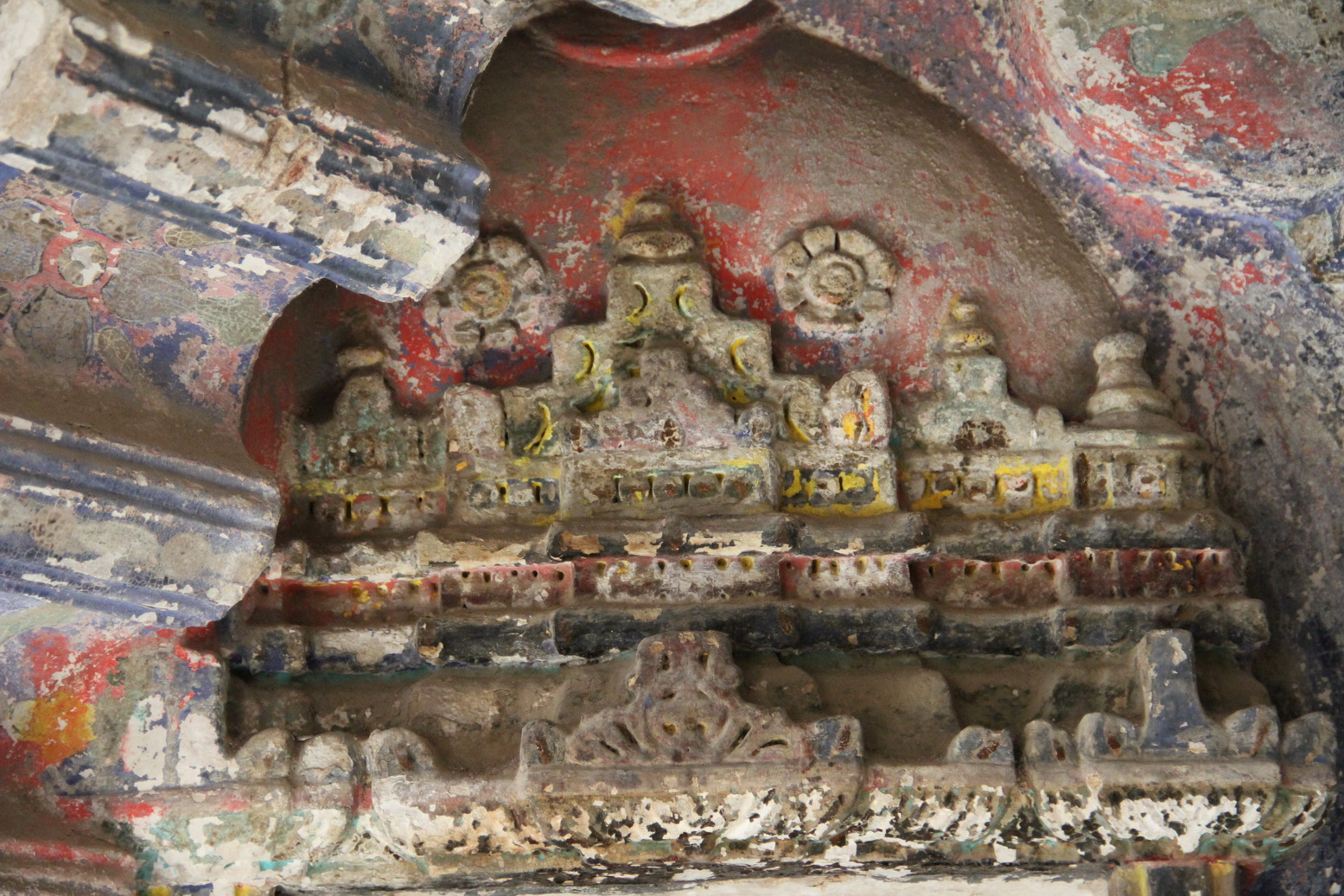
Wall carving of Nagarparkar Bazaar Temple

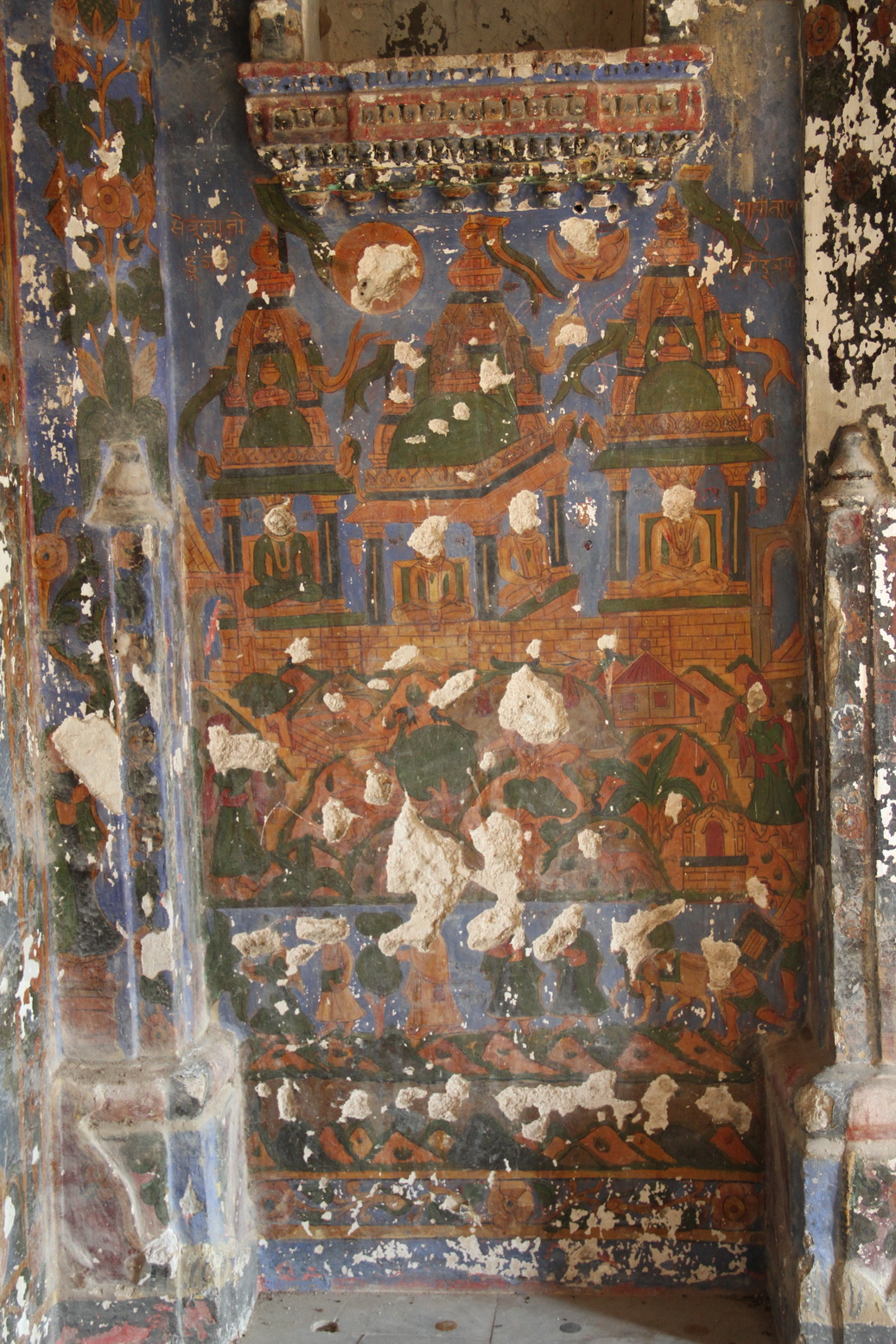
Painting of Tirthankaras at the Bazaar Temple

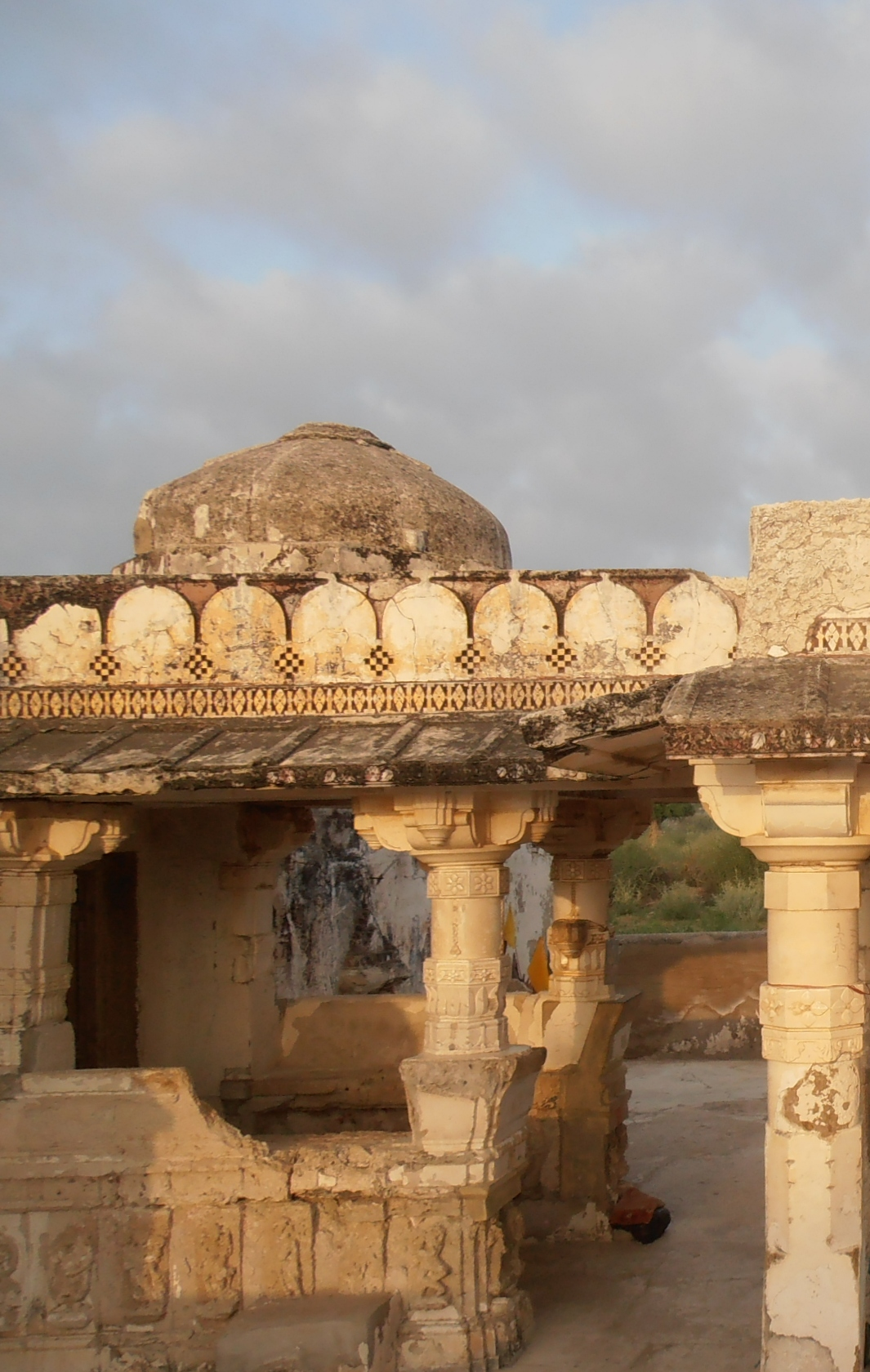
Entry to the Godi Temple

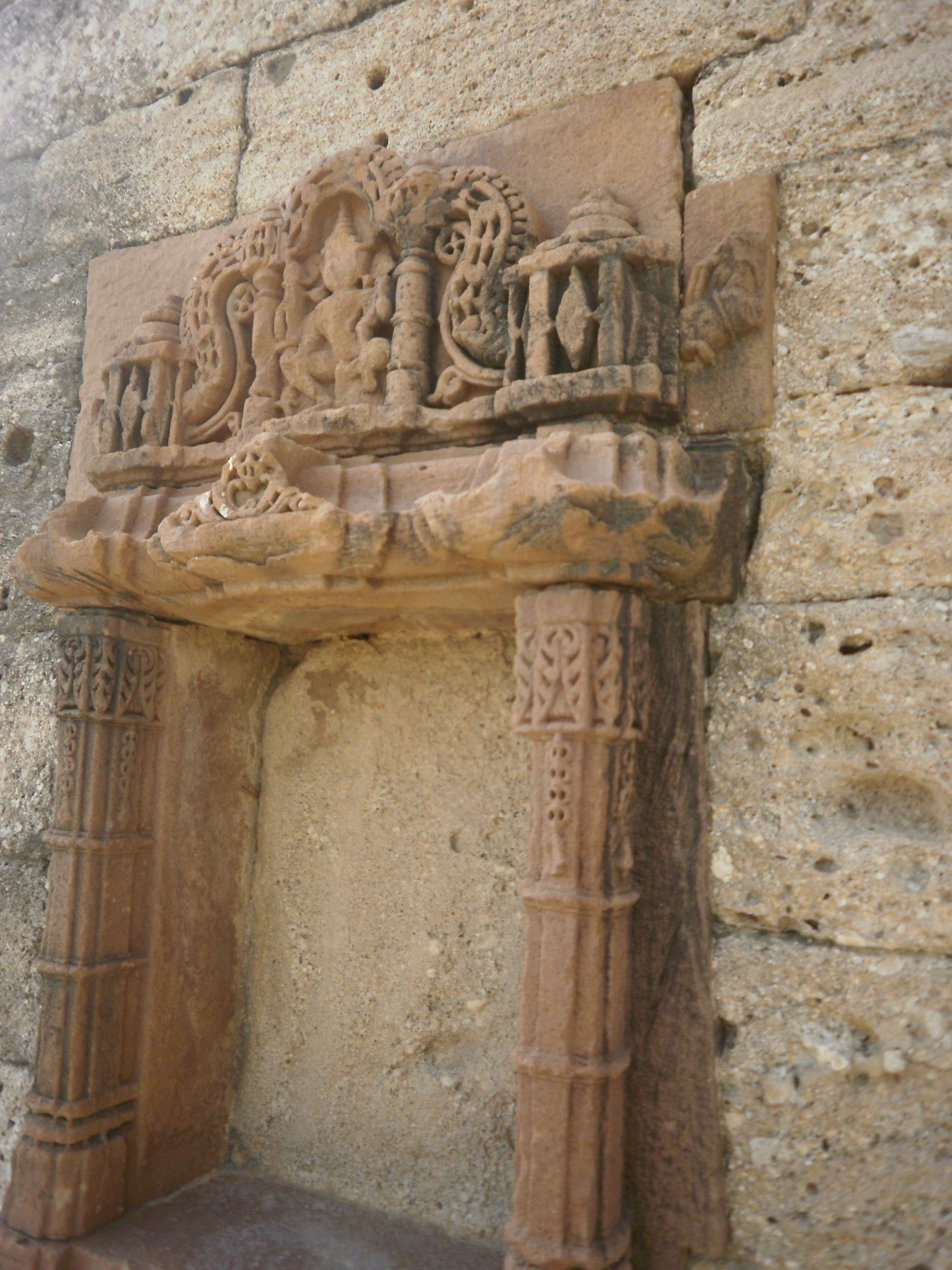
Intricate stonework at Godi Temple

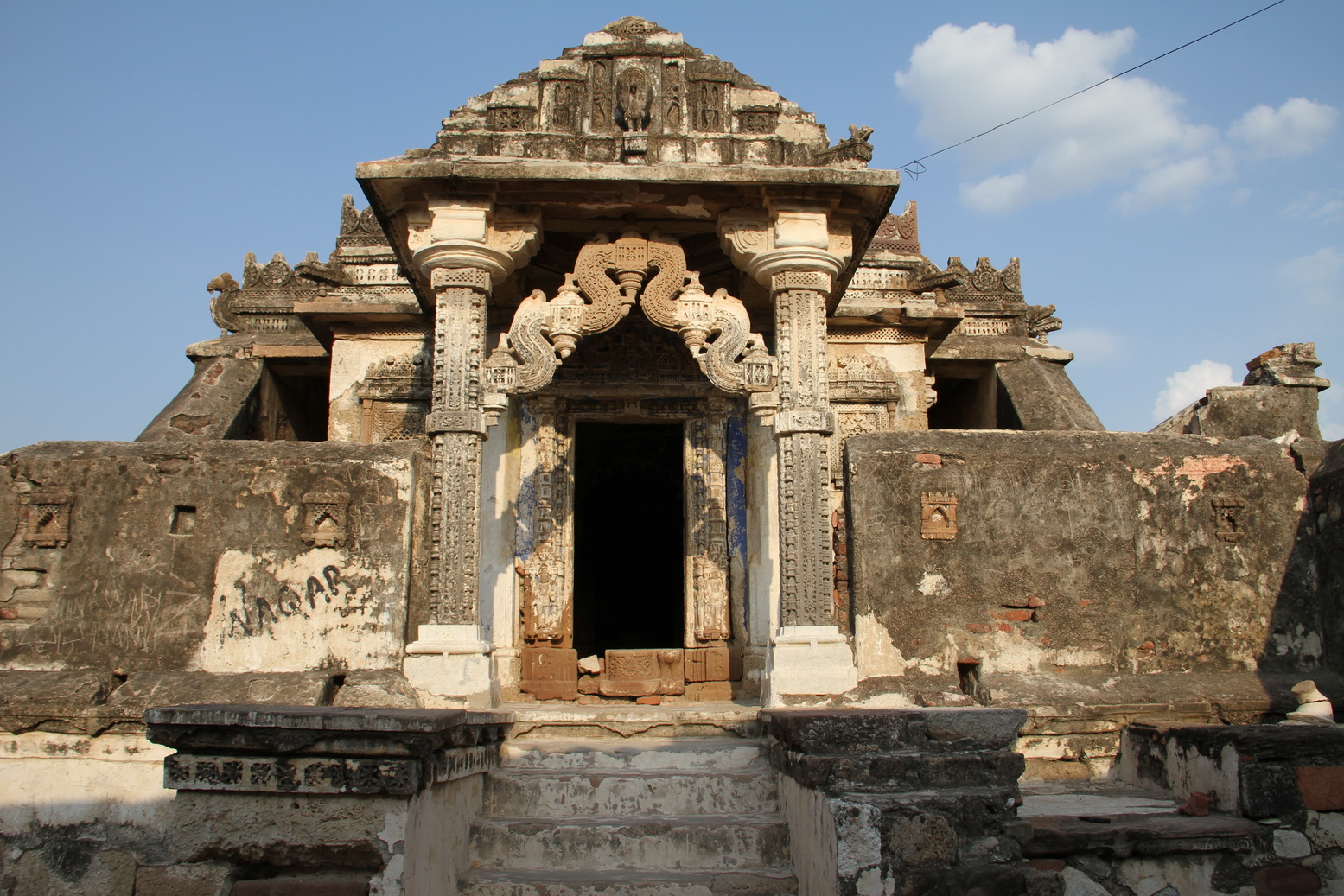
Jain Temple in Nagarparkar

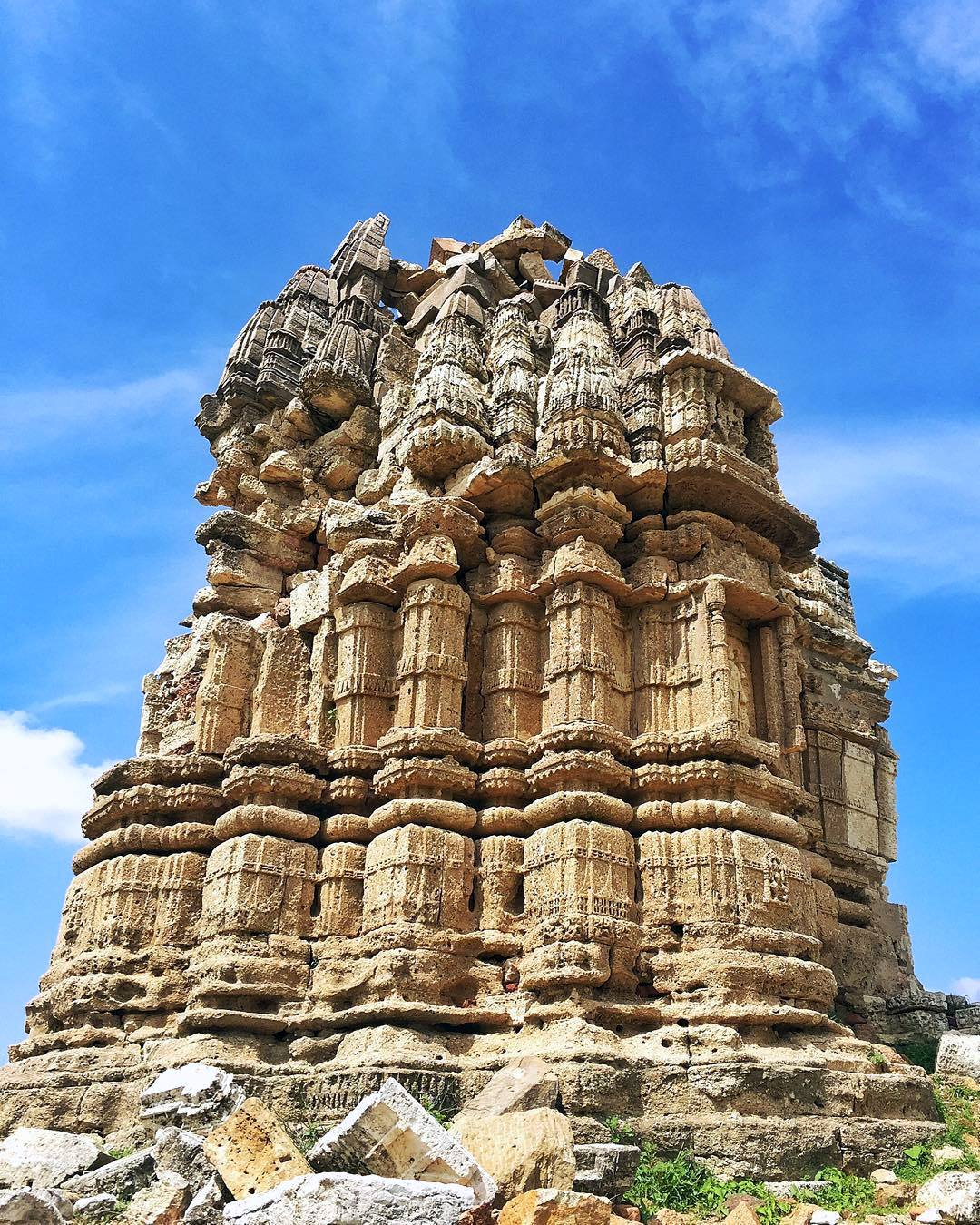
Jain temple 2 in Nagarparkar

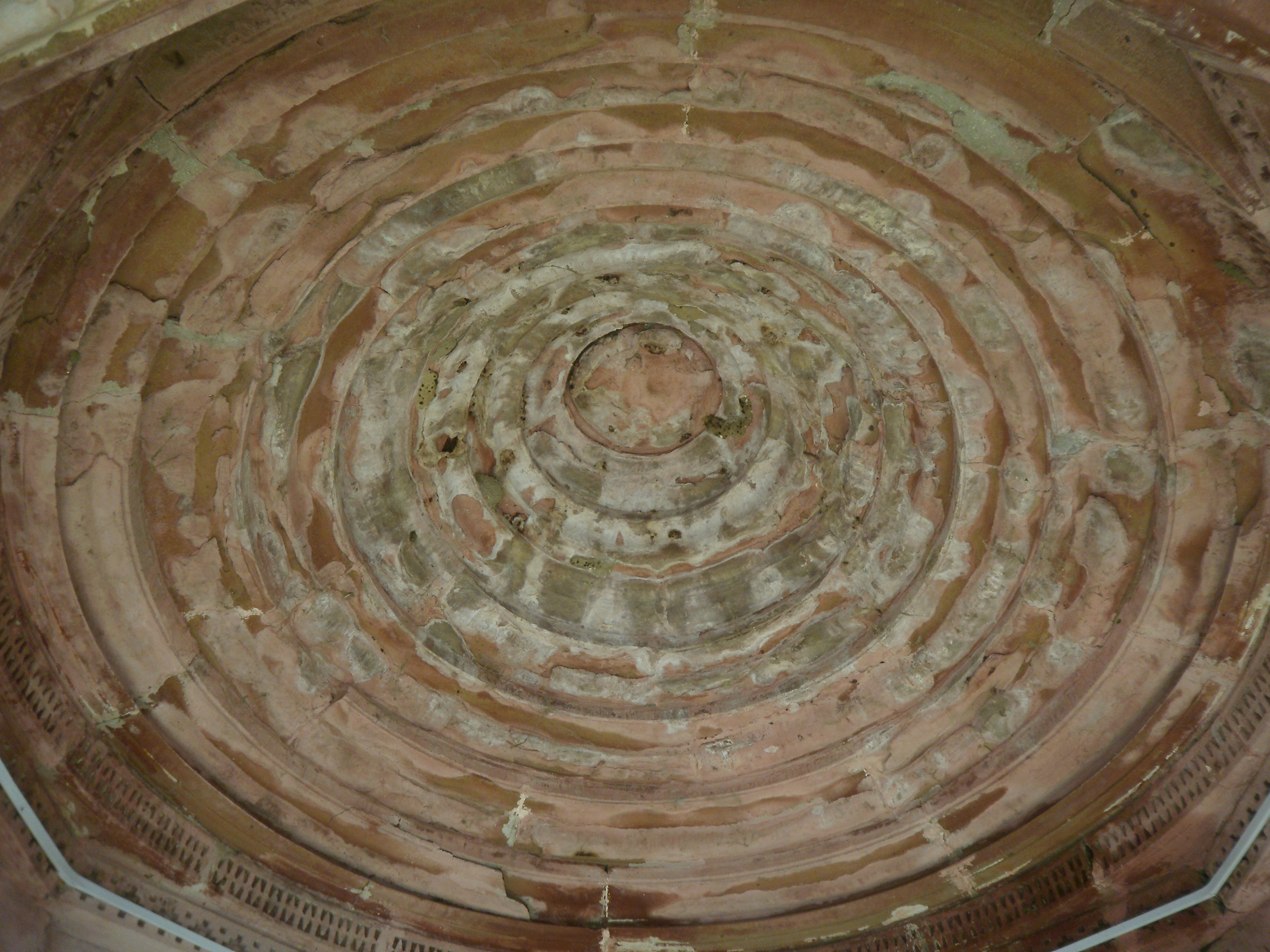
The dome at the Bhodesar Mosque is similar to those found in nearby Jain temples.

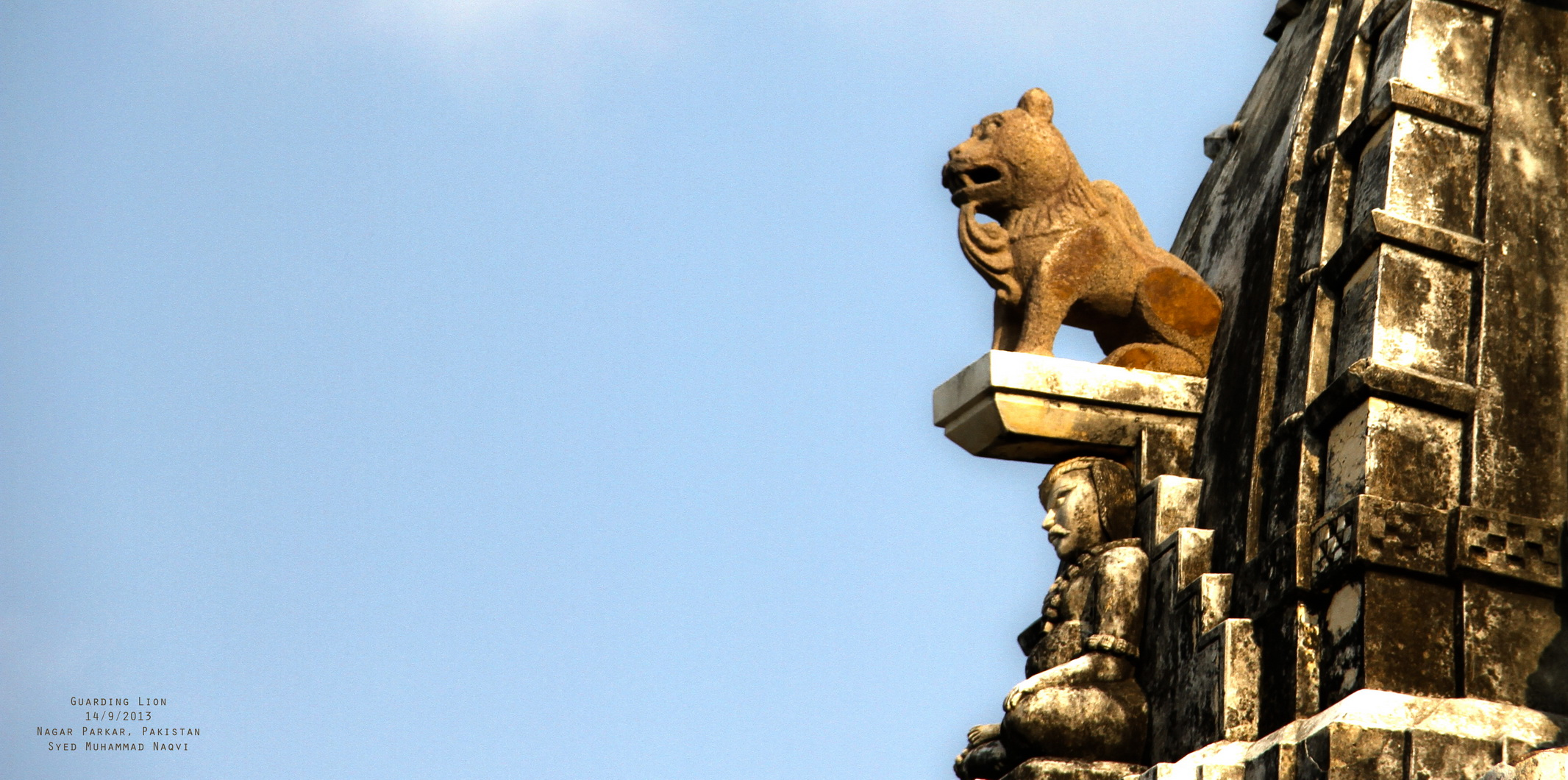
External view of a Jain Temple
