= Pakistan Tourism Development Corporation =

Organization of Government of Pakistan to promote tourism

- PTDC ادارہ برائے فروغِ سیاحت پاکستان
- Logo of PTDC

Agency overview
- Formed: 30 March 1970; 56 years ago
- Jurisdiction: Government of Pakistan
- Headquarters: Islamabad Capital Territory Pakistan
- Agency executive: Wasi Shah, Special Assistant to the Prime Minister on Tourism
- Website: Official website

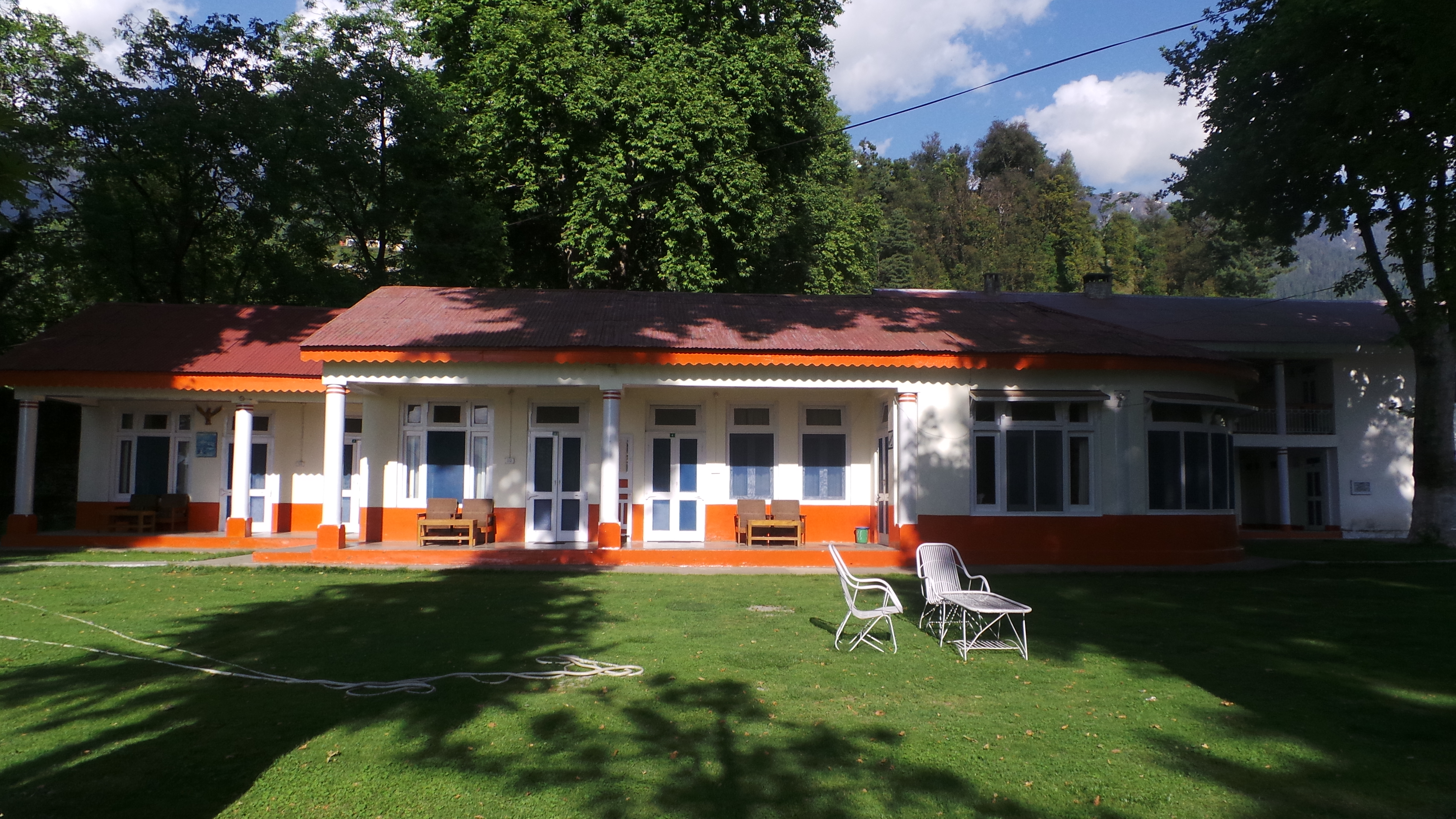
PTDC Miandam, Swat valley

Pakistan Tourism Development Corporation (PTDC; Urdu: ادارہ برائے فروغِ سیاحت پاکستان) is an organization of the Government of Pakistan. The PTDC is governed by a board of directors and for promoting and developing tourism provides transportation to various areas and owns and runs several motels across the country. It was incorporated on 30 March 1970.

== Properties ==
=== Hotels ===
- Flashman's Hotel

=== Motels ===
PTDC runs motels at a number of locations throughout the country to provide quality and low-cost accommodation for visitors, mainly tourists. These motels are located at the following locations:

1. Astak
2. Khalti (Ghizer)
3. Ayubia, Islamabad
4. Booni, of Upper Chitral
5. Besham
6. Chitral
7. Karimabad, Hunza
8. Khuzdar, Baluchistan
9. Miandam, Swat
10. Saidu Sharif, Swat
11. Panakot, Dir
12. Satpara
13. Sust, Hunza
14. Torkham, near Peshawar
15. Wagah, near Lahore
16. Ziarat, Quetta
17. Naran
18. Shogran
19. Skardu, Gilgit Baltistan
20. Khaplu, Ghanche

== See also ==
- Sindh Tourism Development Corporation
- Pearl-Continental Hotels & Resorts in Pakistan
- Tourism in Pakistan
