= Flashman's Hotel =

Building in Rawalpindi, Pakistan

- Interactive map of the Flashman's Hotel area

General information
- Location: Rawalpindi, Punjab, Pakistan, The Mall, Rawalpindi
- Coordinates: 33°35′31″N 73°03′13″E
- Opening: 1888
- Owner: Associated Hotels of India (1917–1965); West Pakistan Enemy Property Board; Pakistan Tourism Development Corporation (1976–present)
- Management: Pakistan Tourism Development Corporation

Design and construction
- Developer: Charles Thomas Flashman

Flashman's Hotel is a historic hotel situated on The Mall in Rawalpindi, Pakistan.

== History ==
Flashman's Hotel was founded in 1888 by Charles Thomas Flashman.

In 1917, the ownership of the property was transferred to the Associated Hotels of India, led by Mohan Singh Oberoi.

By 1961, after the partition, it was managed by the Associated Hotels of Pakistan. This venture also included Faletti's Hotel, Cecil Hotel, and Deans Hotel and involved stakeholders such as Associated Hotels of India and Oberoi Hotels.

Following the Indo-Pakistani War of 1965, the Pakistani government designated properties of the Associated Hotels of Pakistan as enemy assets. These properties were subsequently overseen by the West Pakistan Enemy Property Board.

In 1976, the governance of Flashman's, along with Faletti's, Cecil, and Deans, was transferred to the Pakistan Tourism Development Corporation (PTDC).

As of 1999, Flashman's remained under PTDC, while the other hotels were privatized.

== Guests ==
Historically, the hotel was frequented by personnel from the British Army's Northern Command. It also hosted several notable leaders, including Muhammad Ali Jinnah, Liaquat Ali Khan and Zulfiqar Ali Bhutto. It was also the location for cabinet meetings during President Ayub Khan's term.

== Architecture ==
Flashman's Hotel occupies a 9.34-acre plot designated as Khasra No. 17 to 22. The hotel's building reflects a British barracks-style design, evident in its interior woodwork.

The single-story building is divided into a main hall section and another section with 73 family suites and executive lodges. The design incorporates elements from both Indian and English architectural traditions, and there is a pool area adjacent to the family suites.
