= Cuthbert Rodham =

British-Pakistani army officer and sports official

Cuthbert Rodham CBE HQA DSO & Bar (Note: "Bar" refers to a second award of the same honour.) MC
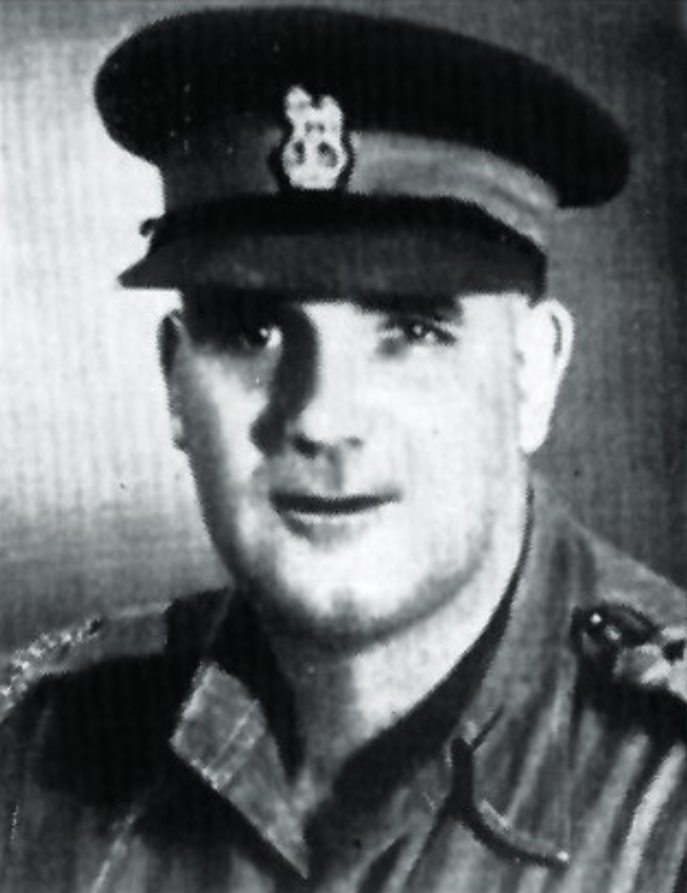
- Rodham while in the British Indian Army

National Director of Sports of Pakistan
- In office 1963 – 16 June 1973

Deputy Chief of the General Staff Pakistan Army
- In office 1957–1963
- Preceded by: Yahya Khan

Personal details
- Born: 25 May 1900 Cornwall, England
- Died: 16 June 1973 (aged 73) Rawalpindi, Punjab, Pakistan
- Education: Dover College
- Nickname: "Roddy"

Military service
- Allegiance: British India; Pakistan
- Branch/service: (British Raj) British Indian Army (1919–1947); Pakistan Army (1947–1963)
- Years of service: 1919—1963
- Rank: Brigadier
- Unit: 2/39th Garhwal Rifles
- Battles/wars: Third Anglo-Afghan War; First Waziristan campaign; Second Waziristan campaign; World War II; Burma Campaign; Southern Resistance War; First Kashmir War
- Awards: Commander of the Order of the British Empire; Hilal-i-Quaid-e-Azam; Distinguished Service Order & Bar; Military Cross

Cuthbert Harold Boyd Rodham CBE HQA DSO & Bar MC (25 May 1900 – 16 June 1973) affectionately called "Roddy", was a distinguished British army officer. After serving in World War II, he was the last serving British officer of the Pakistan Army and is known as the "Father of Pakistani athletics." He also served as the Deputy Chief of the General Staff of the Pakistan Army from 1957 to 1963.

== Early life and education ==
Cuthbert Harold Boyd Rodham was born on 25 May 1900 in Cornwall, England. His father, Harold Rodham CMG (1873–1947), was a rear-admiral in the Royal Navy.

Rodham's father came from Addlestone. Cuthbert Rodham attended Dover College.

== Military career ==
=== British Indian Army ===
He enlisted into the army during the end of World War I. He was commissioned into the 39th Garhwal Rifles of the British Indian Army as a 2nd lieutenant on 15 April 1919.

Rodham took part in the Third Anglo-Afghan War, where he sustained thigh injuries that left him with a lifelong limp. In 1921, for his actions at Takkizam, he was awarded the Military Cross for "gallantry and distinguished service in the field."

In the 1934 New Year Honours, Captain Rodham was appointed an Officer of the Order of the British Empire (OBE).

During World War II, He served with the 2nd Battalion and later commanded the 6th Battalion on the North-West Frontier Province from 1942 to 1944. In April 1944, he was posted as second-in-command of the 100th Indian Infantry Brigade at Imphal and fought in the Burma campaign.

On 15 April 1945, Rodham was promoted to the rank of temporary brigadier and appointed to command the 100th Indian Infantry Brigade. His brigade saw the capture of Prome on 30 April to accelerate the drive to Rangoon, and a heavy engagement against Japanese forces near Pyalo on 1 May. He held this command until 4 February 1946.

He led his men to victory on the Irrawaddy crossing, for which he was awarded the Distinguished Service Order for gallantry. He also earned a Bar to his DSO for his role in the Sibong operations.

During the 1945–1946 war in southern Vietnam, Brigadier Rodham commanded the 100th Indian Infantry Brigade against the Vietnamese independence movement. Rodham explicitly warned his troops that they would face guerrilla warfare with no clear front line, instructing them to maintain high vigilance against ambushes and noting the difficulty of identifying combatants. Consequently, in Operation Instruction No. 220, he directed his forces to treat all locals near areas where shots were fired as enemy combatants.

=== Pakistan Army ===
During the Partition of India in 1947, Rodham joined the Pakistan Army. He commanded the 114th Brigade in Lahore. From 1951 to 1957, Rodham served as the Director of infantry of the Pakistan Army. In 1953, He was elevated to Commander of the Order of British Empire (CBE).

In 1957, Rodham was appointed as the Deputy Chief of the General Staff of the Pakistan Army, which he held until his retirement in 1963. He coached the divisional athletic team and was also the President of the Army Sports Committee and control board.

Notably, for the 1960 Summer Olympics in Rome, Rodham coached eleven of the twelve athletes selected to represent Pakistan from the army. He also heavily supported the national field hockey team, using his administrative influence to secure medical care for players' families and organizing dedicated logistics, such as military cooks, for teams traveling abroad.

== Later life ==
After his retirement from active service, the Government of Pakistan appointed Rodham as the national Director of Sports, a position he held until his death. Concurrently, he served as the chairman of the Pakistan Boxing Federation and sat on the executive committee of the Pakistan Olympic Association.

Rodham was awarded the Hilal-i-Quaid-e-Azam for his work. He has been revered as the "Father of Pakistani athletics."

Rodham never married. The government granted him a permanent room at the Flashman's Hotel in Rawalpindi in perpetuity, where he resided for the remainder of his life. He remained a well-respected figure within army high command.

Cuthbert Harold Boyd Rodham died on 16 June 1973 in Rawalpindi. He left his belongings to his friend, Muhammad. His awards and medals were later auctioned in 1997 and again in 2000.
