= Sindh Tourism Development Corporation =

Tourism in Pakistan

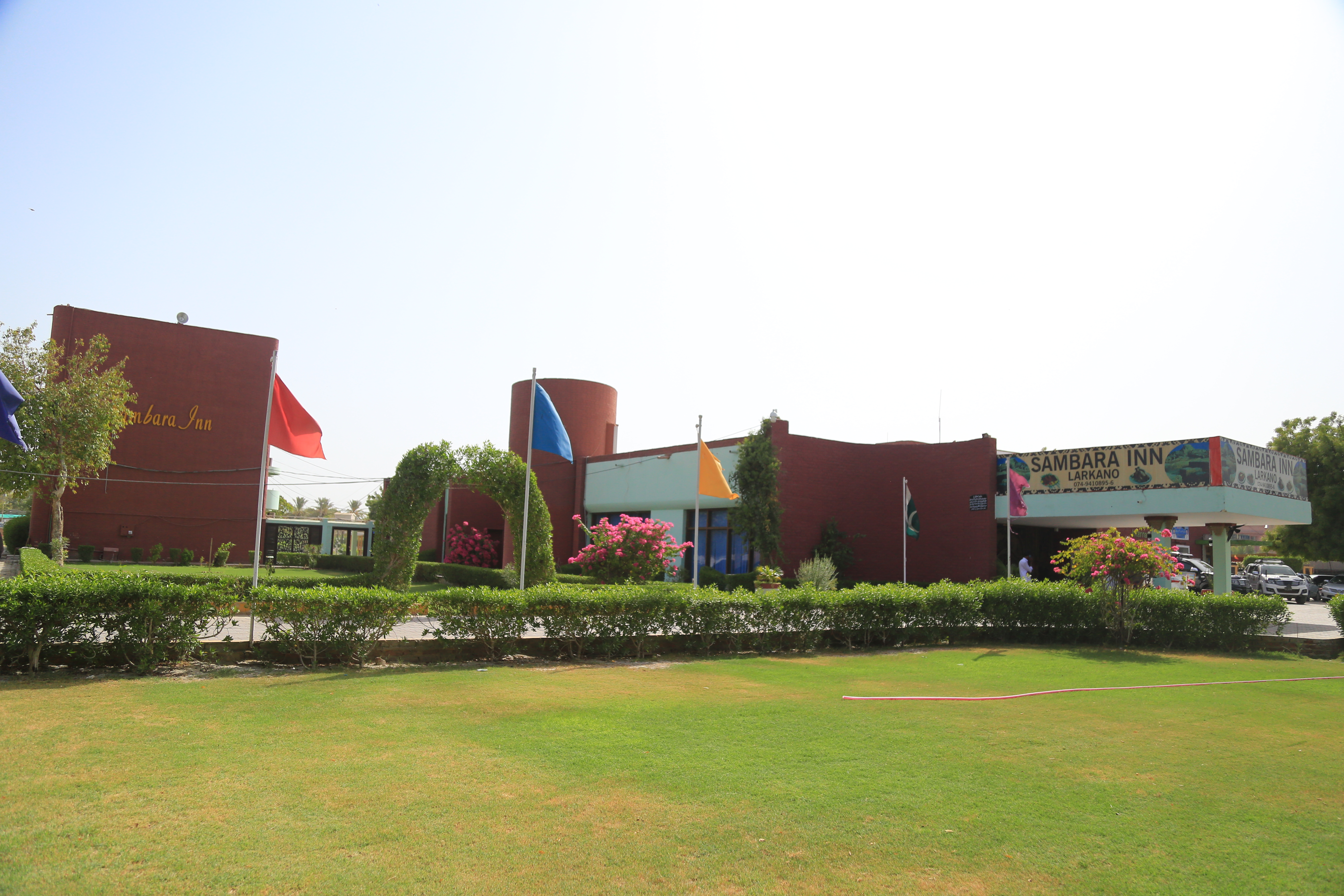
- Sambara Inn operated by Sindh Tourism Development Corporation
- Industry: Tourism
- Founded: 1992
- Headquarters: Karachi, Sindh, Pakistan
- Key people: Syed Sardar Ali Shah, Minister Culture, Tourism & Antiquities, Government of Sindh, Mr. Aijaz Ahmed Shaikh Managing Director, Mr. Amar Fayaz Buriro Consultant
- Products: Promotion of tourism
- Total assets: 15 motels and resorts
- Number of employees: 117
- Website: stdc.gos.pk

Sindh Tourism Development Corporation (STDC) (Sindhi: سنڌ ٽوئرزم ڊولپمينٽ ڪارپوريشن) is an organization of the Government of Sindh, Pakistan. STDC is governed by the Board of directors and provides facilities to the national and international tourists. It runs several motels and resorts across the Sindh province. STDC was incorporated on 5 June 1992.

The corporation was formed to develop and promote tourism in Sindh, using its geographical assets, its ancient history, its Sufi heritage, its archaeology, its creative and performing arts, and its literature.

== Motels and resorts ==
- STDC Hawksbay Resort, Karachi
- Haleji lake resort, Thatta
- Shahjahani Mosque Guest house & Restaurant, Thatta
- Keenjhar Lake Resort, Thatta
- Nareri lake resort, Badin
- Maruee Rest house, Mithi
- Rooplo Kolhi Resort, Nagarparkar
- Sardharo picnic point, Nagarparkar
- Baqar Lake Resort, Sanghar
- Ranikot resort, Jamshoro
- Lakki Shah Sadar Guest house, Sehwan
- Manchhar lake resort, Sehwan
- Kai Resthouse, Kai Sehwan
- Lal Shahbaz Motel, Sehwan
- Sambara Inn, Larkana
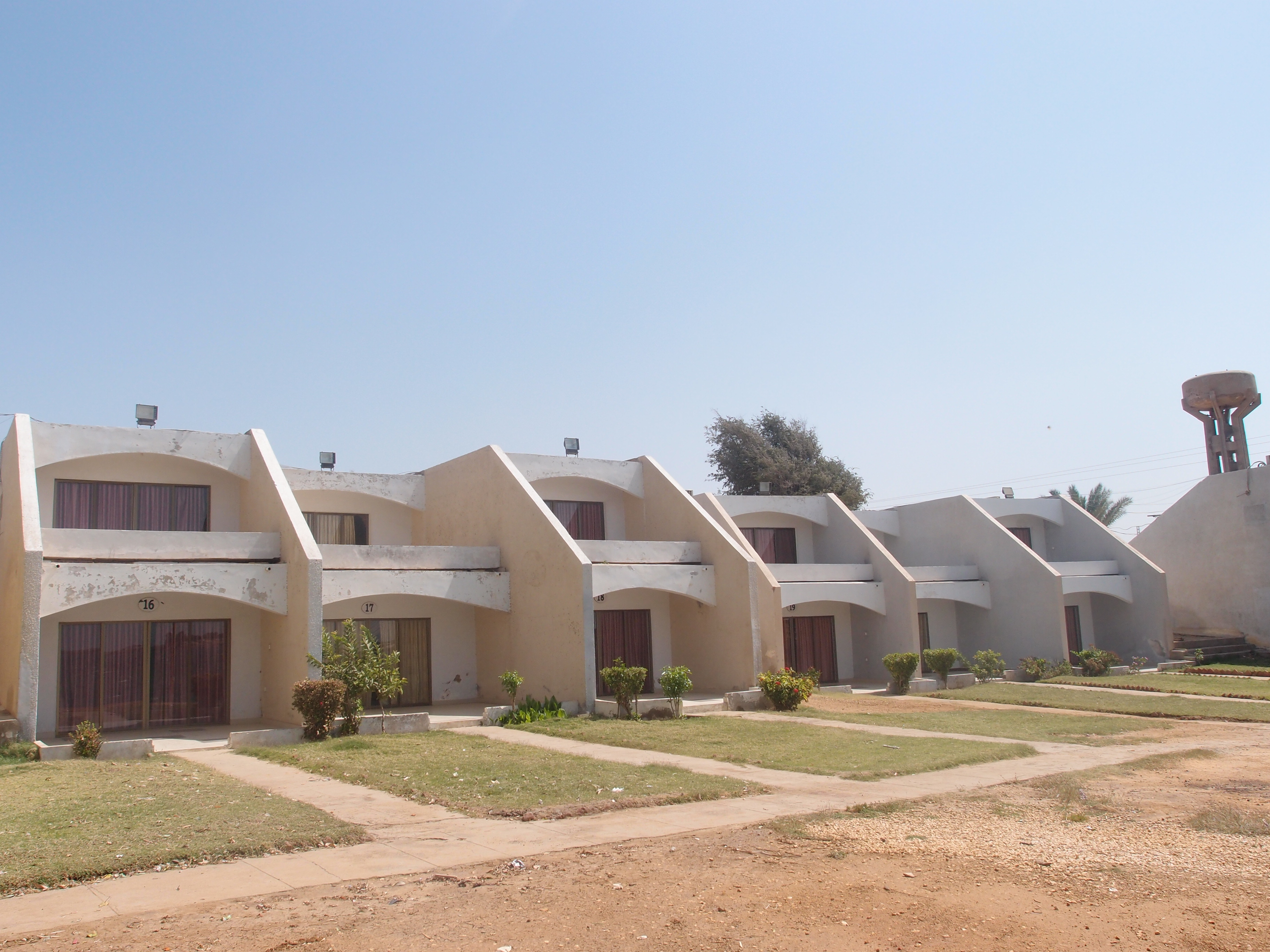
Keenjhar Lake Resort, Thatta

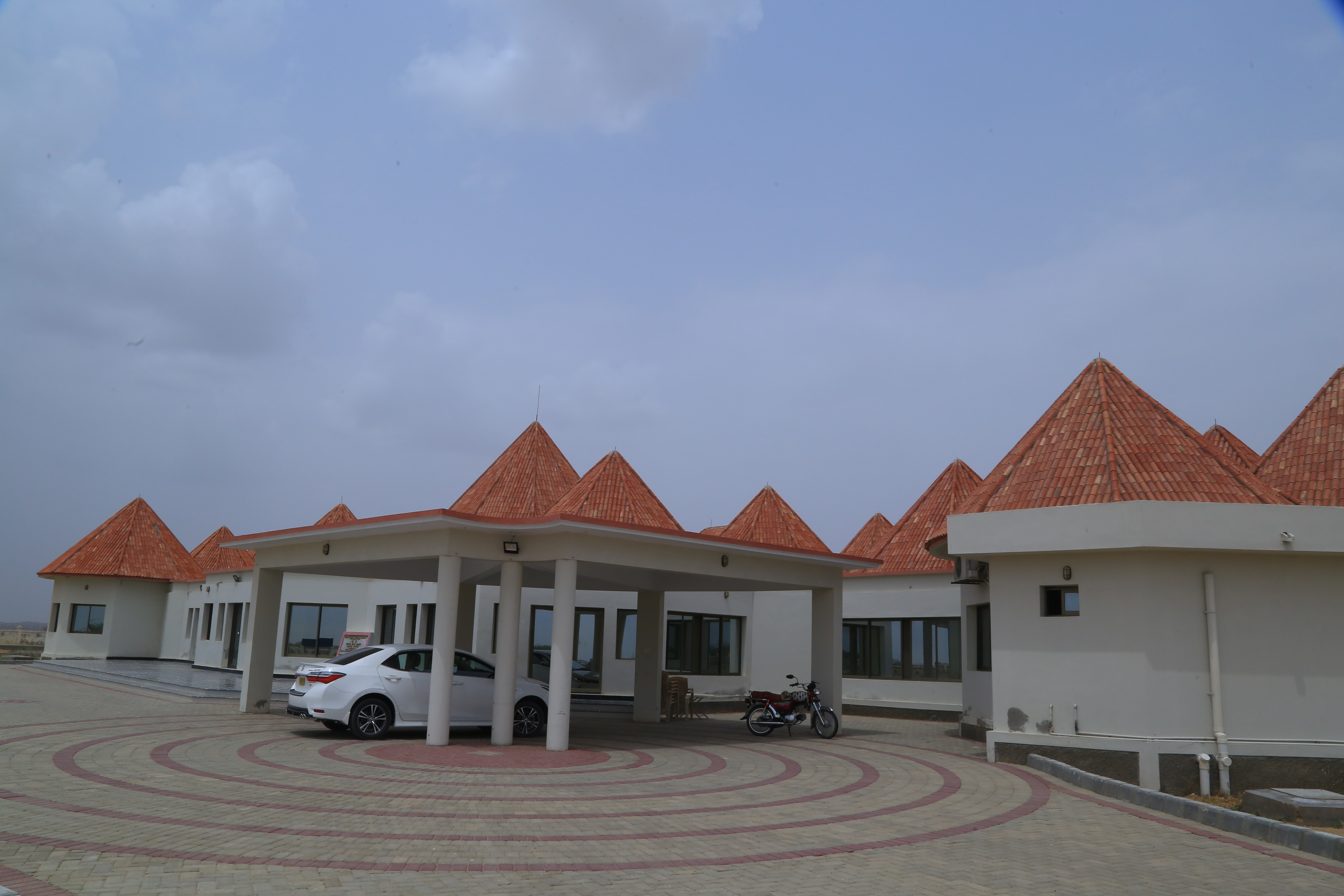
Rooplo Kolhi Resort, Nagarparkar

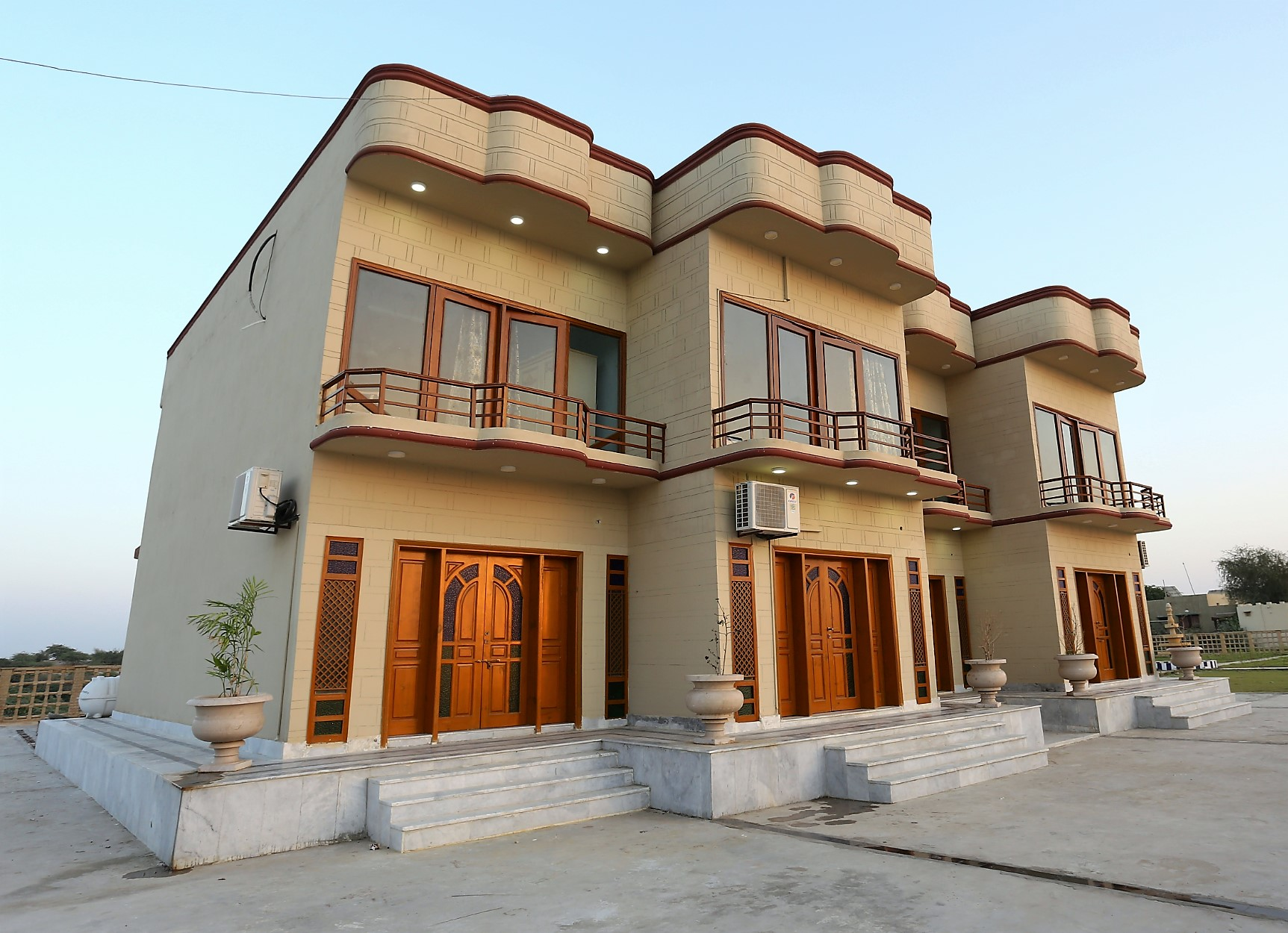
Baqar Lake Resort, Sanghar

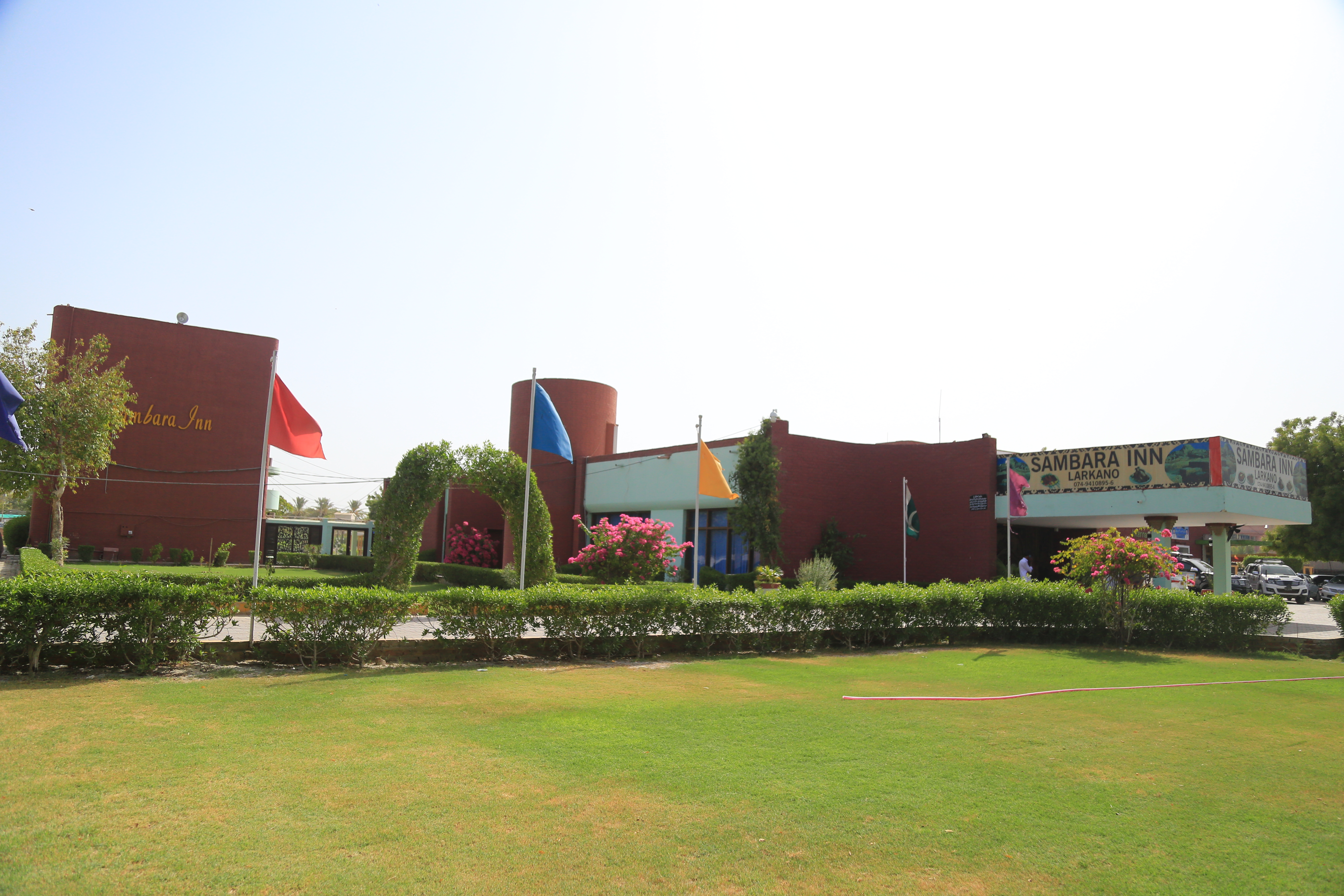
Sambara Inn, Larkana

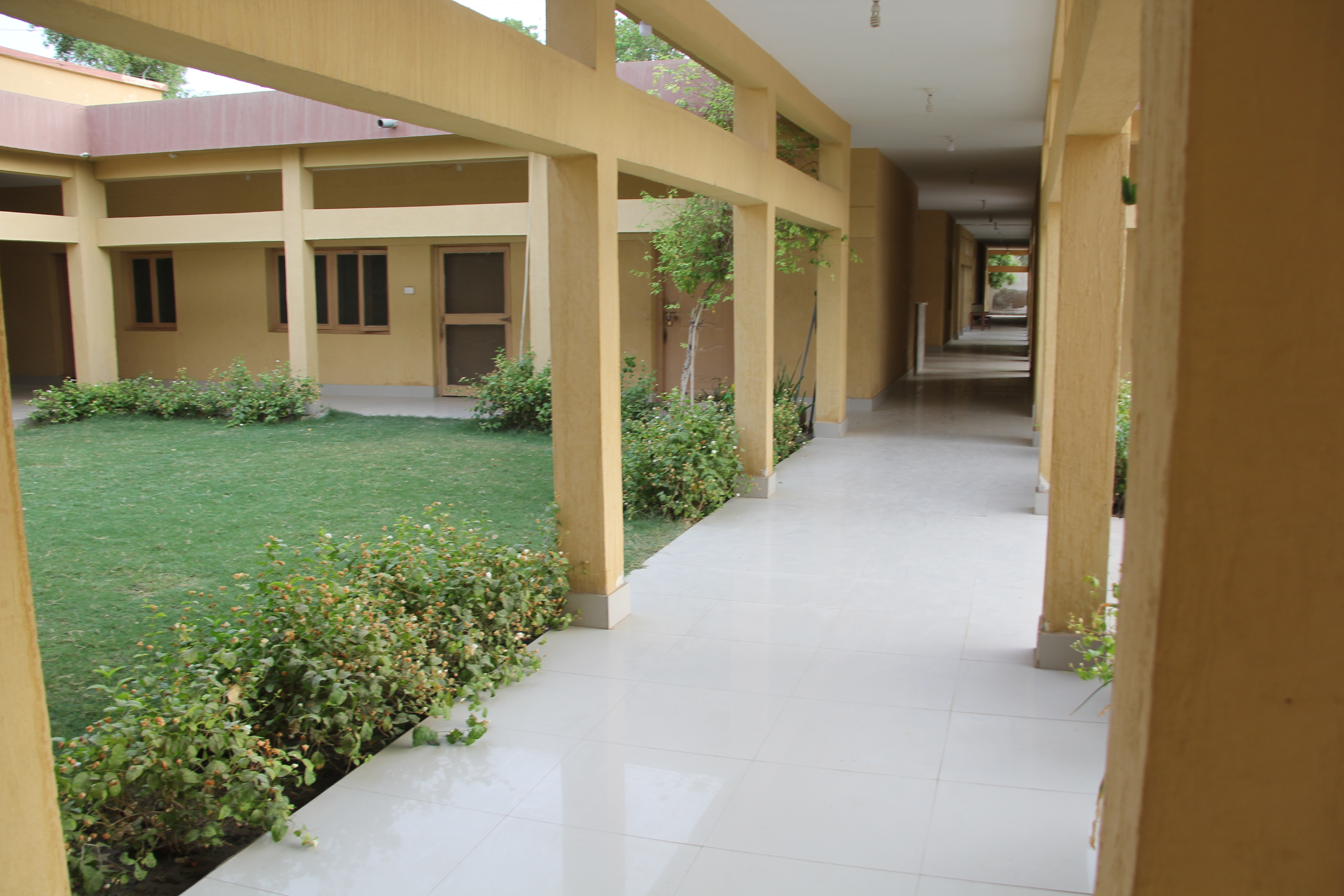
Lal Shahbaz Motel, Sehwan

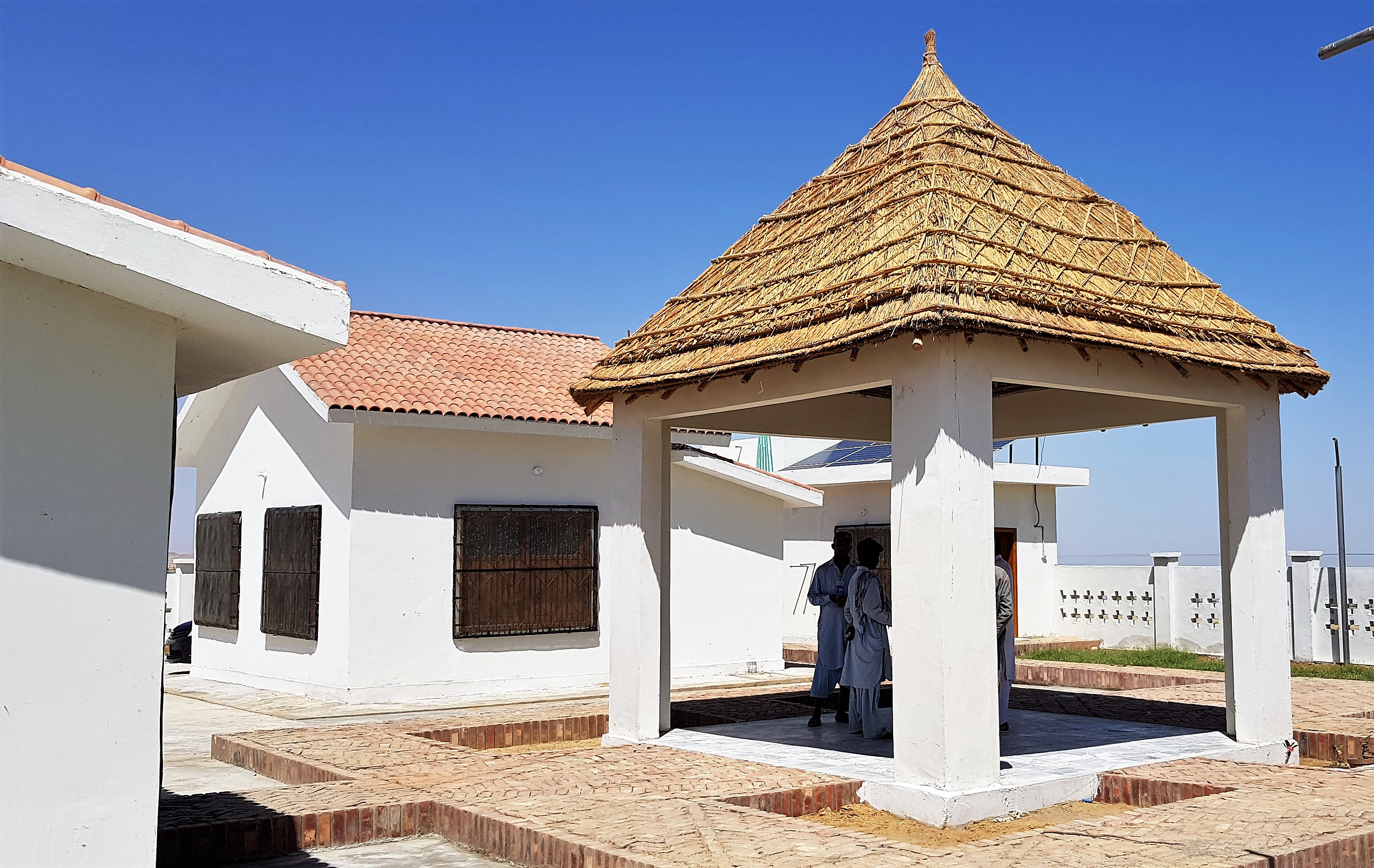
Manchar Lake Resort, Manchar, Sehwan

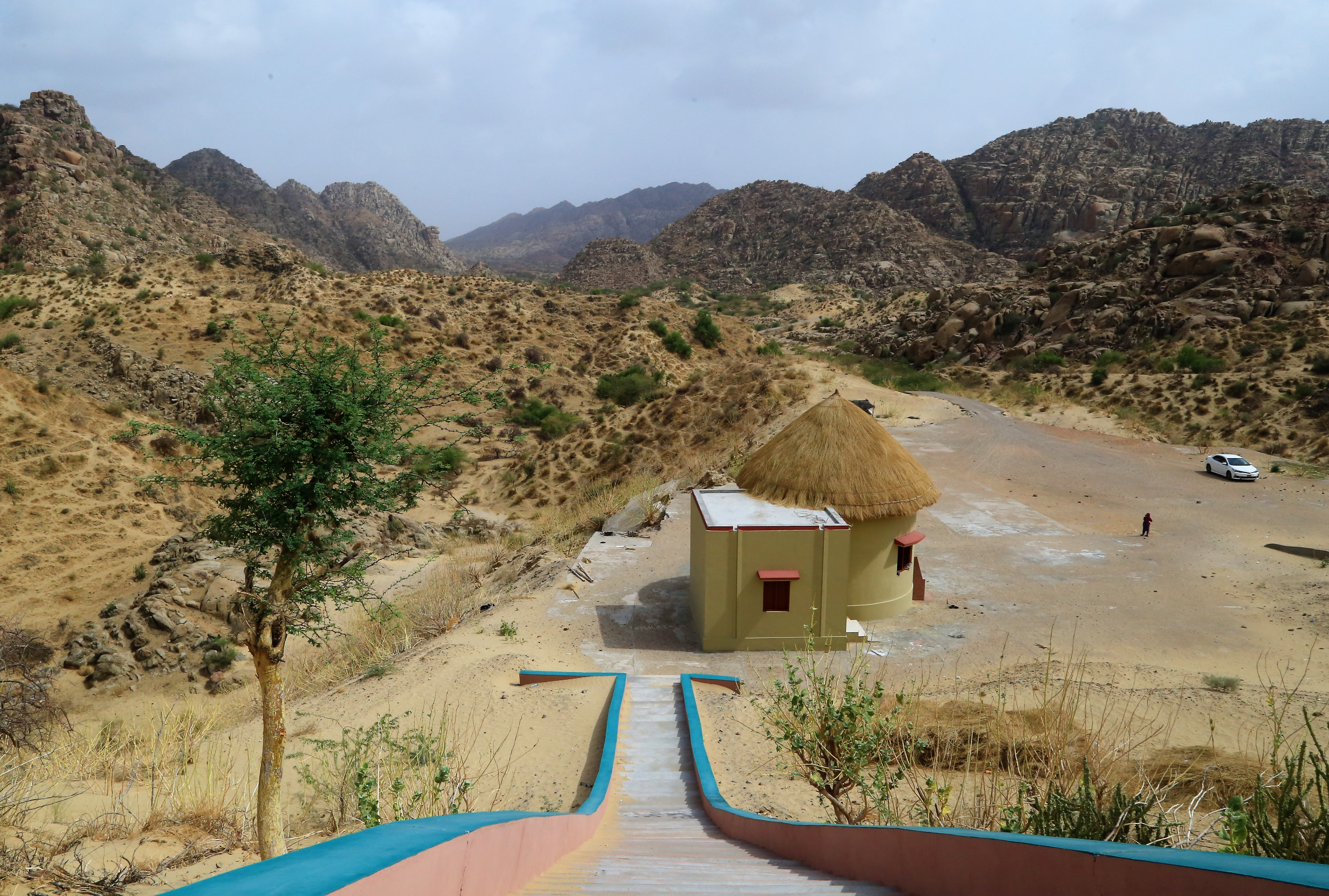
Sardharo Picnic Point, Karoonjhar, Nagarparkar

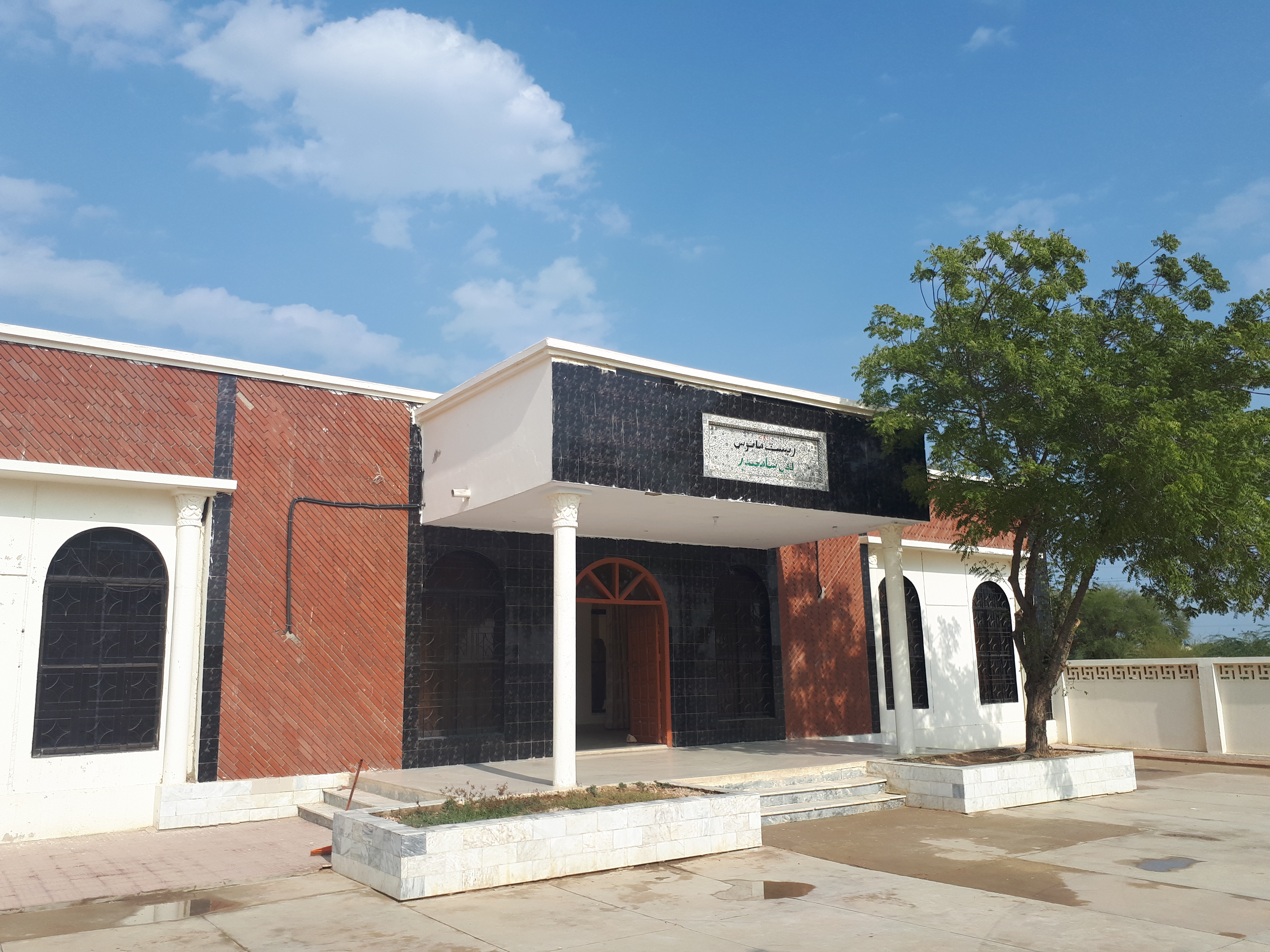
Laki Shah Sadar Rest House, Sehwan

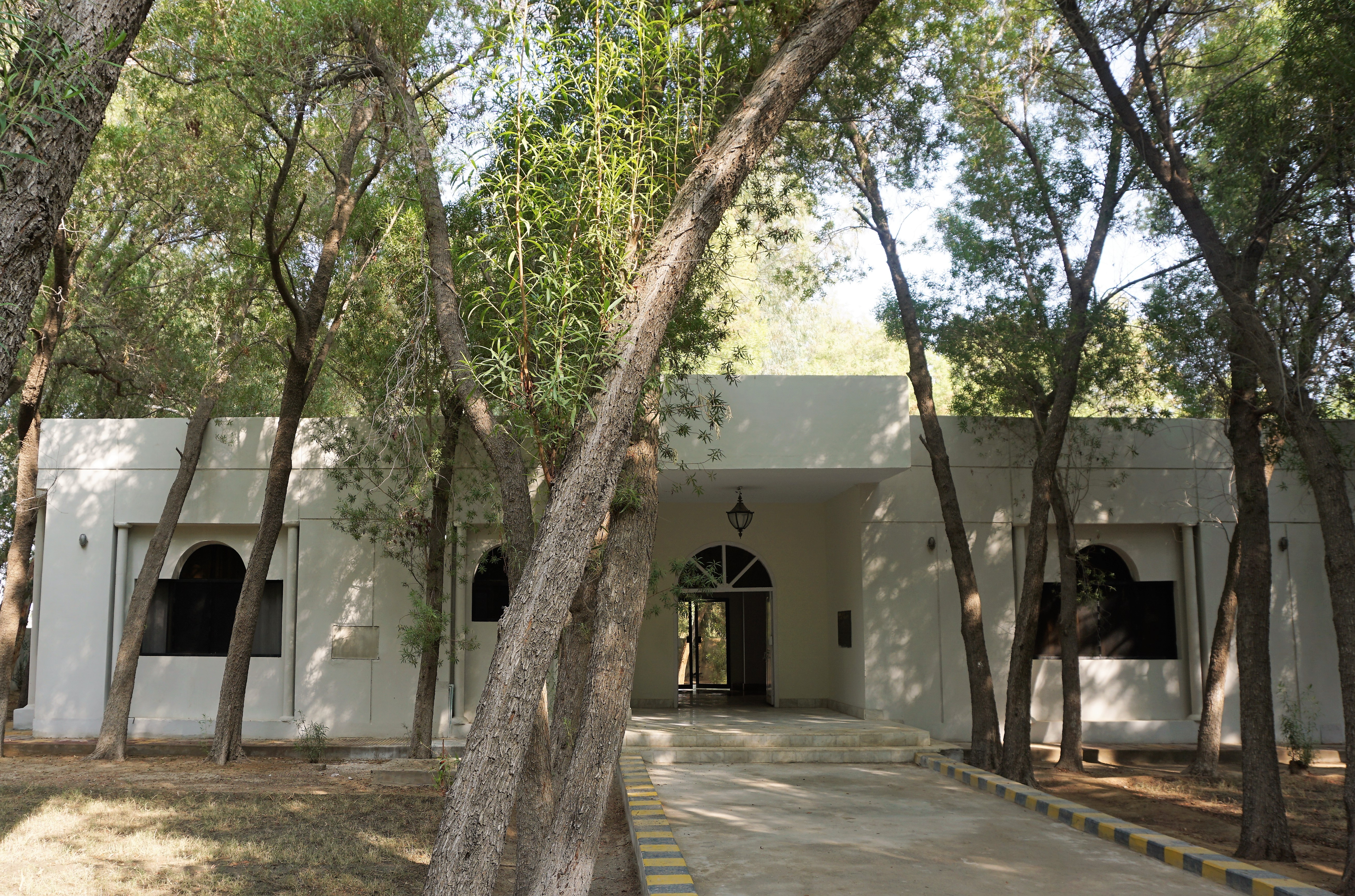
Kai Valley Rest House, Kai, Sehwan

== See also ==
- Pakistan Tourism Development Corp
