= 2024–25 PSA Squash Tour =

International squash tour

Details
- Event name: PSA Squash Tour 2024–25
- Dates: August 2024 – July 2025
- Categories: World Championship: Men's/Women's; PSA Squash Tour Finals: Men's/Women's; PSA Challenger Events; Satellite & Federation Events
- Website; PSA Squash Tour

Achievements
- World Number 1: Men: (Egypt) Mostafa Asal; Women: (Egypt) Nouran Gohar
- World Champion: Men: (Egypt) Mostafa Asal; Women: (Egypt) Nour El Sherbini

The 2024–25 PSA Squash Tour was the international squash tour organised circuit organized by the Professional Squash Association (PSA) for the 2024–25 squash season. It was the 10th PSA season since the merger of PSA and WSA associations in 2015.

The most important tournaments in the series are the PSA World Championship for Men's and Women's. The tour also features two circuits of regular events—PSA World Events (formerly PSA World Tour), which feature the highest prize money and the best fields; and PSA Challenger Events with prize money ranging $3,000–$15,000. In the middle of the year (usually in June), the PSA Squash Tour - World Events tour is concluded by the Men's and Women's PSA Squash Tour Finals in a to be determined venue, the season-ending championships for the top 8 rated players from PSA World Events level tournaments.

== Overview ==
=== PSA World Events changes ===
Starting in August 2024, PSA revamped its professional tour structure into two individual circuits; PSA World Events and PSA Challenger Events.

PSA World Events (formerly PSA World Tour) will comprise the most important tournaments in prize money for more experienced and higher-ranked players, including PSA World Championships and PSA Squash Tour Finals, labeled as follows:

- PSA World Championships — 64-players draw — $600,000
- PSA Squash Tour Finals — 8-players draw — $300,000
- PSA World Events Diamond — 48-player draw — $300,000 - (starting August 2024)
- PSA World Events Platinum — 32-players draw — $190,000
- PSA World Events Gold — 24-players draw — $100,000
- PSA World Events Silver — 24-players draw — $75,000
- PSA World Events Bronze — 24-players draw — $50,000
- PSA World Events Copper — 24-player draw — $25,000 - (starting August 2024)

PSA Challenger Events (formerly Challenger Tour) tournaments will offer a $3,000–$15,000 prize money, an ideal circuit for less-experienced and upcoming players, that will include the following tiers:

- PSA Challenger Events 15 — $15,000
- PSA Challenger Events 12 — $12,000
- PSA Challenger Events 9 — $9,000
- PSA Challenger Events 6 — $6,000
- PSA Challenger Events 3 — $3,000

=== Prize money/ranking points breakdown ===
PSA Squash Tour events also have a separate World Events ranking. Points for this are calculated on a cumulative basis after each World Events event. The top eight players at the end of the calendar year are then eligible to play in the PSA Squash Tour Finals.

Ranking points vary according to tournament tier being awarded as follows:

PSA World Championships			Ranking Points
Rank	Prize money US$	Ranking Points	Winner	Runner up	3/4	5/8	9/16	17/32	33/64
PSA World Championships	$600,000	27683 points	3500	2275	1400	875	525	321	196
PSA Squash Tour Finals			Ranking Points
Rank	Prize money US$	Winner	Runner up	3/4	Round-Robin Match Win	Undefeated bonus
PSA Squash Tour Finals	$300,000	1000	550	200	150	150
PSA World Events			Ranking Points
Rank	Prize money US$	Ranking Points	Winner	Runner up	3/4	5/8	9/16	17/32	33/48
Diamond	$300,000	24511 points	3100	2015	1240	775	465	284	173.5
Platinum	$190,000	17132 points	2800	1820	1120	700	420	257
Gold	$100,000	11010 points	1800	1170	720	450	270	165
Silver	$75,000	8261.5 points	1350	877.5	540	337.5	202.5	124
Bronze	$50,000	5505 points	900	585	360	225	135	82.5
Copper	$25,000	3061 points	500	325	200	125	75	46
PSA Challenger Events			Ranking Points
Rank	Prize money US$	Ranking Points	Winner	Runner up	3/4	5/8	9/16	17/32	33/48
Challenger Events 15	$15,000	1835 points	300	195	120	75	45	27.5
Challenger Events 12	$12,000	1468 points	240	156	96	60	36	22
Challenger Events 9	$9,000	1101 points	180	117	72	45	27	16.5
Challenger Events 6	$6,000	734 points	120	78	48	30	18	11
Challenger Events 3	$3,000	367 points	60	39	24	15	9	5.5
PSA Satellite Events			Ranking Points
Rank	Prize money US$	Ranking Points	Winner	Runner up	3/4	5/8	9/16	17/32	33/64
PSA Satellite Events	$1,000 – $3,000	183.5 points	30	19.5	12	7.5	4.5	2.75

== Calendar ==
=== Key ===
PSA Tiers
World Championship
World Events Diamond
World Events Platinum
World Events Gold
World Events Silver
World Events Bronze
World Events Copper
Challenger Events 3/6/9/12/15

=== August ===
Tournament	Date	Champion	Runner-Up	Semifinalists	Quarterfinalists
RGSA Open; São Caetano do Sul, Brazil; Men : Challenger 6; 24 players – $6,000	13–17 August	(Colombia) Andrés Herrera; 11–7, 6–11, 11–8, 11–3 (1st PSA title)	(Brazil) Pedro Mometto	(Brazil) Diego Gobbi (Paraguay) Francesco Marcantonio	(Argentina) Segundo Portabales (Brazil) Guilherme Melo (Colombia) Juan José Torres (Brazil) Rhuan Sousa
Reliance PSA Challenge (Sri Lanka) Ratmalana, Sri Lanka; Men: Challenger 3; 24 players – $3,000 −−−−−− Women: Challenger 3; 16 players – $3,000	15–18 August	(Sri Lanka) Ravindu Laksiri; 8–11, 11–2, 11–5, 11–5 (5th PSA title)	(Sri Lanka) Shamil Wakeel	(India) Vedant Patel (Japan) Shota Yasunari	(Egypt) Seif Heikal (Sri Lanka) Shariff Hakeem (Sri Lanka) Ashan de Silva (Sri Lanka) Tuwin Nilakshana
Reliance PSA Challenge (Sri Lanka) Ratmalana, Sri Lanka; Men: Challenger 3; 24 players – $3,000 −−−−−− Women: Challenger 3; 16 players – $3,000	15–18 August	(India) Anahat Singh; 11–0, 11–1, 11–4 (5th PSA title)	(Sri Lanka) Chanithma Sinaly	(Sri Lanka) Yeheni Kuruppu (India) Janet Vidhi	(Hong Kong) Jannis Lam (Sri Lanka) Adhithi Gunasekera (Pakistan) Anam Mustafa Aziz (Sri Lanka) Ranliya Wood
Out East White Bear Challenge (United States) North Sea, United States; Men: Challenger 6; 24 players - $6,000	21–25 August	(England) Nathan Lake; 10–12, 11–9, 11–7, 11–8 (9th PSA title)	(United States) Hollis Robertson	(Mexico) César Segundo (Egypt) Abdelrahman Nassar	(Ecuador) David Costales (United States) Nicholas Spizzirri (Egypt) Mohamed Nabil (Pakistan) Abdul Malik Khan
HCL Squash Tour – Kolkata (India) Kolkata, India; Men: Challenger 3; 24 players – $3,000 −−−−−− Women: Challenger 3; 24 players – $3,000	27–31 August	(Sri Lanka) Ravindu Laksiri; 11–7, 13–11, 11–3 (6th PSA title)	(Kuwait) Ammar Al-Tamimi	(India) Rahul Baitha (India) Suraj Chand	(India) Diwakar Singh (India) Om Semwal (India) Vedant Patel (India) Mohit Bhatt
HCL Squash Tour – Kolkata (India) Kolkata, India; Men: Challenger 3; 24 players – $3,000 −−−−−− Women: Challenger 3; 24 players – $3,000	27–31 August	(India) Anahat Singh; 11–5, 11–3, 11–7 (6th PSA title)	(Philippines) Jemyca Aribado	(India) Anjali Semwal (Iran) Fereshteh Eghtedari	(India) Shameena Riaz (India) Unnati Tripathi (India) Sunita Patel (Sri Lanka) Yeheni Kuruppu
Tuanku Muhriz Trophy (Malaysia) Seremban, Malaysia; Men: Challenger 15; 24 players - $15,000 −−−−−− Women: Challenger 15; 24 players - $15,000	28 Aug. – 1 Sept.	(India) Abhay Singh; 7–11, 11–8, 12–10, 11–4 (10th PSA title)	(Hong Kong) Alex Lau	(India) Velavan Senthilkumar (Malaysia) Addeen Idrakie	(Pakistan) Noor Zaman (Hong Kong) Tang Ming Hong (Egypt) Mohamed Nasser (Malaysia) Syafiq Kamal
Tuanku Muhriz Trophy (Malaysia) Seremban, Malaysia; Men: Challenger 15; 24 players - $15,000 −−−−−− Women: Challenger 15; 24 players - $15,000	28 Aug. – 1 Sept.	(Malaysia) Aira Azman; 11–9, 11–9, 11–9 (3rd PSA title)	(Hong Kong) Chan Sin Yuk	(Malaysia) Aifa Azman (Malaysia) Ainaa Amani	(Malaysia) Yasshmita Jadishkumar (Egypt) Hana Ismail (India) Akanksha Salunkhe (Malaysia) Sehveetrraa Kumar
Life Time Colleyville Open (United States) Colleyville, United States; Men: Challenger 3; 24 players – $3,000	28 Aug. – 1 Sept.	(Pakistan) Ahsan Ayaz; 11–6, 8–11, 11–3, 11–8 (2nd PSA title)	(India) Yash Bhargava	(Malaysia) Siow Yee Xian (Egypt) Shady El Sherbiny	(Canada) Brett Schille (Ecuador) David Costales (Republic of Ireland) Denis Gilevskiy (Mexico) Luis Aquino
CIB Egyptian Open (Egypt) Giza, Egypt; Men: World Events – Diamond; 48 players – $325,500 ------ Women: World Events – Diamond; 48 players – $325,500	30 Aug. – 6 Sep.	(Egypt) Mostafa Asal; 11–3, 13–11, 5–11, 11–8 (16th PSA title)	(Egypt) Ali Farag	(Peru) Diego Elías (England) Marwan El Shorbagy	(New Zealand) Paul Coll (Egypt) Mazen Hesham (England) Mohamed El Shorbagy (Egypt) Tarek Momen
CIB Egyptian Open (Egypt) Giza, Egypt; Men: World Events – Diamond; 48 players – $325,500 ------ Women: World Events – Diamond; 48 players – $325,500	30 Aug. – 6 Sep.	(Egypt) Nour El Sherbini; 5–11, 11–8, 11–8, 11–8 (41st PSA title)	(Egypt) Nouran Gohar	(Egypt) Hania El Hammamy (Egypt) Nada Abbas	(Egypt) Sana Ibrahim (Egypt) Rowan Elaraby (England) Georgina Kennedy (Belgium) Tinne Gilis

=== September ===
Tournament	Date	Champion	Runner-Up	Semifinalists	Quarterfinalists
ACE Challenger 12K (Malaysia) Kuala Lumpur, Malaysia; Men: Challenger 12; 24 players – $12,000 −−−−−− Women: Challenger 12; 24 players – $12,000	4–8 September	(India) Velavan Senthilkumar; 11–5, 11–6, 11–9 (9th PSA title)	(Pakistan) Noor Zaman	(Malaysia) Addeen Idrakie (Malaysia) Ameeshenraj Chandaran	(Malaysia) Darren Pragasam (Egypt) Mohamed Nasser (Pakistan) Nasir Iqbal (Egypt) Yassin Shohdy
ACE Challenger 12K (Malaysia) Kuala Lumpur, Malaysia; Men: Challenger 12; 24 players – $12,000 −−−−−− Women: Challenger 12; 24 players – $12,000	4–8 September	(Malaysia) Ainaa Amani; 11–9, 11–4, 11–7 (3rd PSA title)	(Egypt) Hana Ismail	(Malaysia) Aifa Azman (India) Akanksha Salunkhe	(Malaysia) Yasshmita Jadishkumar (Egypt) Salma El-Alfy (India) Anahat Singh (Malaysia) Sehveetrraa Kumar
Squash Inspire - Abbas Family (United States) Columbia, United States; Women: Challenger 9; 24 players – $9,000	10–14 September	(Egypt) Habiba Hani; 11–7, 9–11, 11–7, 8–11, 11–2 (2nd PSA title)	(Malaysia) Yee Xin Ying	(Australia) Alex Haydon (Egypt) Zeina Zein	(Norway) Madeleine Hylland (Ukraine) Alina Bushma (Barbados) Margot Prow (Poland) Karina Tyma
PSA Aramis Club (Belgium) Nimy, Belgium; Men: Challenger 3; 24 players – $3,000	11–14 September	(South Africa) Dewald van Niekerk; 11–6, 16–14, 11–6 (6th PSA title)	(England) Sam Osborne-Wylde	(Netherlands) Rowan Damming (Belgium) Lowie Delbeke	(England) Will Salter (Belgium) Nathan Masset (France) Macéo Lévy (Scotland) Martin Ross
247 International (United States) Florham Park, United States; Men: Challenger 3; 16 players – $3,000	13–15 September	(Egypt) Mohamed Sharaf; 11–4, 11–4, 17–15 (1st PSA title)	(Pakistan) Ahsan Ayaz	(Mexico) César Segundo (Egypt) Karim Elbarbary	(United States) Salim Khan (United States) Dylan Kachur (Pakistan) Ibrahim Noorani (United States) Wajiullah Nasim
Paris Squash (France) Paris, France; Men: World Events – Platinum; 32 players – $213,000 −−−−−− Women: World Events – Platinum; 32 players – $213,000	15–21 September	(Egypt) Mostafa Asal; 11–7, 11–8, 4–11, 11–7 (17th PSA title)	(Egypt) Ali Farag	(Peru) Diego Elías (New Zealand) Paul Coll	(Egypt) Tarek Momen (Egypt) Karim Gawad (England) Mohamed El Shorbagy (Egypt) Mazen Hesham
Paris Squash (France) Paris, France; Men: World Events – Platinum; 32 players – $213,000 −−−−−− Women: World Events – Platinum; 32 players – $213,000	15–21 September	(Egypt) Nour El Sherbini; 6–11, 11–3, 8–11, 11–7, 11–4 (42nd PSA title)	(Egypt) Nouran Gohar	(Egypt) Hania El Hammamy (Egypt) Rowan Elaraby	(Egypt) Fayrouz Aboelkheir (United States) Olivia Weaver (United States) Amanda Sobhy (Belgium) Nele Coll
NASH Cup (Canada) London, Canada; Men: World Events – Copper; 24 players – $28,750 −−−−−− Women: World Events – Copper; 24 players – $28,750	17–21 September	(Egypt) Mohamad Zakaria; 9–11, 7–11, 11–5, 11–9, 11–1 (5th PSA title)	(England) Curtis Malik	(Malaysia) Sanjay Jeeva (Hong Kong) Henry Leung	(Canada) David Baillargeon (Egypt) Yahya Elnawasany (Mexico) César Salazar (Australia) Joseph White
NASH Cup (Canada) London, Canada; Men: World Events – Copper; 24 players – $28,750 −−−−−− Women: World Events – Copper; 24 players – $28,750	17–21 September	(England) Katie Malliff; 9–11, 11–4, 12–14, 11–3, 11–8 (4th PSA title)	(England) Torrie Malik	(Scotland) Georgia Adderley (England) Grace Gear	(United States) Marina Stefanoni (United States) Caroline Fouts (Spain) Marta Domínguez (England) Saran Nghiem
KCC 120th Anniversary Challenge Cup; Hong Kong, China; Men: Challenger 6; 24 players – $6,000 −−−−−− Women: Challenger 6; 24 players – $6,000	17–21 September	(Egypt) Yassin Shohdy; 11–7, 11–5, 4–11, 8–11, 12–10 (3rd PSA title)	(Hong Kong) Wong Chi Him	(Malaysia) Duncan Lee (Hong Kong) Andes Ling	(Hong Kong) Tang Ming Hong (Malaysia) Ong Sai Hung (South Korea) Ryu Jeong-min (Hong Kong) Leo Chung
KCC 120th Anniversary Challenge Cup; Hong Kong, China; Men: Challenger 6; 24 players – $6,000 −−−−−− Women: Challenger 6; 24 players – $6,000	17–21 September	(Hong Kong) Heylie Fung; 11–9, 11–9, 11–5 (2nd PSA title)	(Hong Kong) Ena Kwong	(Philippines) Jemyca Aribado (Egypt) Nour Khafagy	(Hong Kong) Toby Tse (Malaysia) Anrie Goh (Hong Kong) Ka Huen Leung (Hong Kong) Kirstie Wong
Paraguay Open; Asunción, Paraguay; Women: Challenger 6; 16 players – $6,000	18–21 September	(Republic of Ireland) Hannah Craig; 8–11, 11–8, 11–9, 9–11, 11–7 (1st PSA title)	(Colombia) Lucía Bautista	(Paraguay) Fiorella Gatti (Mexico) Diana García	(Colombia) María Tovar (Ecuador) Caridad Buenaño (Paraguay) Lola Aznares (Chile) Antonia Vera
Jack Fairs Open (Canada) London, Canada; Men: Challenger 3; 24 players – $3,000	18–21 September	(Canada) Brett Schille; 9–11, 11–4, 11–1, 11–7 (1st PSA title)	(Canada) Connor Turk	(Canada) Liam Marrison (Canada) Abbas Nawaz	(Mexico) Guillermo Cortés (Canada) Mohammadreza Jafarzadeh (Canada) Maximilien Godbout (Canada) Elliott Hunt
LifeTime MetroWest Open (United States) Framingham, United States; Men: Challenger 6; 24 players - $6,000	18–22 September	(India) Veer Chotrani; 11–6, 11–6, 11–6 (4th PSA title)	(Malaysia) Siow Yee Xian	(Egypt) Abdelrahman Nassar (United States) Dillon Huang	(Nigeria) Onaopemipo Adegoke (Pakistan) Huzaifa Ibrahim (Pakistan) Ahsan Ayaz (Ecuador) David Costales
Genesee Valley Club Open (United States) Rochester, United States; Women: Challenger 6; 24 players - $6,000	18–22 September	(Egypt) Habiba Hani; 8–11, 11–9, 11–3, 11–6 (3rd PSA title)	(Egypt) Jana Safy	(South Africa) Hayley Ward (Malaysia) Yee Xin Ying	(Barbados) Margot Prow (Mexico) Sarahí López (Egypt) Malak Taha (Croatia) Franka Vidović
Budapest Open (Hungary) Budapest, Hungary; Men: World Events – Copper; 24 players – $30,000	22–26 September	(England) Jonah Bryant; 11–5, 8–11, 11–2, 11–3 (7th PSA title)	(England) Declan James	(Egypt) Mohamed Abouelghar (England) Patrick Rooney	(Switzerland) Yannick Wilhelmi (Wales) Emyr Evans (Egypt) Yassin ElShafei (England) George Parker
Charlottesville Open (United States) Charlottesville, United States; Men: World Events – Copper; 24 players - $28,750	24–28 September	(Pakistan) Asim Khan; 12–14, 12–10, 11–5, 11–6 (11th PSA title)	(England) Nick Wall	(Egypt) Moustafa El Sirty (Mexico) César Salazar	(Egypt) Ibrahim Elkabbani (Egypt) Karim El Hammamy (Japan) Ryūnosuke Tsukue (Egypt) Aly Hussein
II SPAC Open (Brazil) São Paulo, Brazil; Men: Challenger 6; 24 players – $6,000 −−−−−− Women: Challenger 6; 16 players – $6,000	24–28 September	(Colombia) Ronald Palomino; 10–1^{rtd.} (7th PSA title)	(Colombia) Edgar Ramírez	(Brazil) Pedro Mometto (Mexico) César Segundo	(Netherlands) Rowan Damming (United States) Christopher Gordon (Paraguay) Francesco Marcantonio (Colombia) Andrés Herrera
II SPAC Open (Brazil) São Paulo, Brazil; Men: Challenger 6; 24 players – $6,000 −−−−−− Women: Challenger 6; 16 players – $6,000	24–28 September	(Colombia) Lucía Bautista; 11–9, 8–11, 10–12, 11–9, 11–9 (2nd PSA title)	(Republic of Ireland) Hannah Craig	(Brazil) Laura Silva (Paraguay) Fiorella Gatti	(Brazil) Tatiana Borges (Mexico) Diana García (Colombia) Catalina Peláez (Ecuador) Ariana Álava
Schräglage Squash Open (Germany) Böblingen, Germany; Men: Challenger 6; 24 players – $6,000 −−−−−− Women: Challenger 6; 24 players – $6,000	25–29 September	(Egypt) Ziad Ibrahim; 12–10, 11–5, 11–2 (1st PSA title)	(South Africa) Dewald van Niekerk	(Egypt) Mazen Gamal (England) James Peach	(Republic of Ireland) Sam Buckley (Hong Kong) Andes Ling (Egypt) Khaled Labib (Austria) Aqeel Rehman
Schräglage Squash Open (Germany) Böblingen, Germany; Men: Challenger 6; 24 players – $6,000 −−−−−− Women: Challenger 6; 24 players – $6,000	25–29 September	(Egypt) Amina El Rihany; 11–5, 11–8, 11–6 (3rd PSA title)	(Scotland) Alison Thomson	(Austria) Jacqueline Peychär (France) Léa Barbeau	(Republic of Ireland) Breanne Flynn (Germany) Katerina Týcová (Switzerland) Ambre Allinckx (Japan) Risa Sugimoto
Assore & Balwin Joburg Open (South Africa) Johannesburg, South Africa; Men: Challenger 3; 24 players – $3,000 −−−−−− Women: Challenger 3; 16 players – $3,000	25–29 September	(South Africa) Damian Groenewald; 11–8, 11–9, 7–11, 4–11, 11–7 (1st PSA title)	(South Africa) Ruan Olivier	(South Africa) Reuel Videler (South Africa) Jonty Matthys	(South Africa) John Anderson (South Africa) Luhann Groenewald (Egypt) Omar Bahgat (South Africa) Diodivine Mkhize
Assore & Balwin Joburg Open (South Africa) Johannesburg, South Africa; Men: Challenger 3; 24 players – $3,000 −−−−−− Women: Challenger 3; 16 players – $3,000	25–29 September	(Iran) Fereshteh Eghtedari; 11–5, 11–4, 11–4 (1st PSA title)	(South Africa) Alexa Pienaar	(South Africa) Teagan Roux (South Africa) Jordin Phillips	(South Africa) Hayley Ward (South Africa) Ellena Chemaly-Sutherland (South Africa) Elzandri Janse v Rensburg (South Africa) Megan Shannon
1er Open International SKODA–XO Conseil (France) Quimper, France; Men: Challenger 3; 24 players – $3,000	25–29 September	(France) Baptiste Bouin; 11–3, 11–8, 11–5 (1st PSA title)	(France) Manuel Paquemar	(Netherlands) Sebastiaan Hofman (France) Amir Khaled-Jousselin	(England) Will Salter (France) Titouan Isambard (France) Antonin Romieu (Romania) Vasile Hapun
Stourbridge Open (England) Stourbridge, England; Men: Challenger 3; 24 players – $3,000	25–29 September	(England) Sam Osborne-Wylde; 11–6, 11–9, 11–5 (1st PSA title)	(England) Noah Meredith	(Chile) José Gallegos (England) Jared Carter	(Pakistan) Amaad Fareed (Wales) Lewis Poole (Denmark) Theis Houlberg (Australia) Connor Hayes
QTerminals Qatar Classic; Doha, Qatar; Men : World Events – Platinum; 32 players – $215,000 ------ Women : World Events – Platinum; 32 players – $215,000	30 Sep.–5 Oct.	(Peru) Diego Elías; 12–10, 12–10, 14–12 (19th PSA title)	(Egypt) Mostafa Asal	(Wales) Joel Makin (Egypt) Ali Farag	(Egypt) Karim Gawad (Egypt) Fares Dessouky (Egypt) Tarek Momen (Switzerland) Nicolas Müller
QTerminals Qatar Classic; Doha, Qatar; Men : World Events – Platinum; 32 players – $215,000 ------ Women : World Events – Platinum; 32 players – $215,000	30 Sep.–5 Oct.	(Egypt) Nour El Sherbini; 10–12, 5–11, 11–6, 11–9, 11–6 (43rd PSA title)	(Egypt) Nouran Gohar	(Egypt) Hania El Hammamy (United States) Olivia Weaver	(Belgium) Nele Coll (England) Georgina Kennedy (Egypt) Amina Orfi (Belgium) Tinne Gilis

=== October ===
Tournament	Date	Champion	Runner-Up	Semifinalists	Quarterfinalists
Ispahani 4th Bangladesh Open; Dhaka, Bangladesh; Men: Challenger 3; 16 players – $3,000	1–4 October	(Sri Lanka) Ravindu Laksiri; 10–12, 11–9, 11–5, 11–2 (7th PSA title)	(Kuwait) Ammar Al-Tamimi	(Iran) Pouya Shafieifard (Kuwait) Mohammad Almasoud	(Pakistan) Khakan Malik (India) Guhan Senthilkumar (Egypt) Seif Heikal (Sri Lanka) Viduranga Udantha
Heroes Austrian Open (Austria) Graz, Austria; Men: Challenger 15; 24 players – $15,000	2–6 October	(England) Declan James; 9–11, 14–12, 11–6, 11–8 (16th PSA title)	(Israel) Daniel Poleshchuk	(England) Ben Smith (Egypt) Khaled Labib	(Egypt) Yassin ElShafei (Hong Kong) Matthew Lai (Malaysia) Sanjay Jeeva (France) Brice Nicolas
Wakefield PSA Open (United States) The Plains, United States; Men: Challenger 6; 16 players – $6,000	3–6 October	(Egypt) Zahed Salem; 11–8, 11–9, 5–11, 8–11, 11–7 (7th PSA title)	(United States) Nicholas Spizzirri	(Egypt) Abdelrahman Nassar (Malaysia) Siow Yee Xian	(Colombia) Mateo Restrepo (Egypt) Mohamed Sharaf (Pakistan) Ahsan Ayaz (United States) Salim Khan
Open Squash Classic (United States) New York City, United States; Men: World Events – Bronze; 24 players – $56,380 −−−−−− Women: World Events – Bronze; 24 players – $56,380	6–10 October	(England) Marwan El Shorbagy; 11–7, 11–6, 8–11, 11–9 (14th PSA title)	(France) Victor Crouin	(Scotland) Greg Lobban (Colombia) Miguel Á Rodríguez	(India) Abhay Singh (Egypt) Mohamad Zakaria (England) Nathan Lake (India) Velavan Senthilkumar
Open Squash Classic (United States) New York City, United States; Men: World Events – Bronze; 24 players – $56,380 −−−−−− Women: World Events – Bronze; 24 players – $56,380	6–10 October	(Egypt) Farida Mohamed; 11–7, 11–6, 11–9 (10th PSA title)	(Hong Kong) Lee Ka Yi	(Canada) Hollie Naughton (England) Katie Malliff	(Egypt) Mariam Metwally (Egypt) Nada Abbas (Malaysia) Rachel Arnold (Egypt) Kenzy Ayman
John Hett Sports Foundation Open (Nigeria) Lagos, Nigeria; Men: Challenger 3; 16 players – $3,000 −−−−−− Women: Challenger 3; 16 players – $3,000	8–12 October	(Nigeria) Gabriel Olufunmilayo; 11–7, 14–12, 11–5 (2nd PSA title)	(Nigeria) Kehinde Temitope	(Nigeria) Ayomide Oladipupo (Nigeria) Abel Shedrack	(Nigeria) Dominion Utukpe (Nigeria) Sulaimon Faruq (Nigeria) Matthew Yusuf (Nigeria) Hammed Abdullahi
John Hett Sports Foundation Open (Nigeria) Lagos, Nigeria; Men: Challenger 3; 16 players – $3,000 −−−−−− Women: Challenger 3; 16 players – $3,000	8–12 October	(Nigeria) Olatunji Busayo; 11–6, 4–11, 12–14, 11–7, 11–8 (2nd PSA title)	(Nigeria) Abdulazeez Rofiat	(Nigeria) Misturah Durosinlorun (Nigeria) Blessing Isaac	(Nigeria) Awawu Balogun (Nigeria) Jadesola Olatunji (Nigeria) Faidat Soliu (Nigeria) Titilayo Akinleye
Mile High 360 Squash Classic (United States) Denver, United States; Men: Challenger 15; 24 players – $15,000	8–12 October	(Pakistan) Ashab Irfan; 15–13, 8–11, 9–11, 11–8, 11–9 (3rd PSA title)	(Pakistan) Asim Khan	(Pakistan) Noor Zaman (England) Tom Walsh	(Colombia) Ronald Palomino (Mexico) César Salazar (United States) Spencer Lovejoy (Canada) David Baillargeon
Open Evaé Féminin (France) Strasbourg, France; Women: Challenger 6; 24 players – $6,000	9–13 October	(France) Lauren Baltayan; 5–11, 11–8, 11–7, 11–5 (2nd PSA title)	(Egypt) Hana Ismail	(Egypt) Amina El Rihany (Switzerland) Ambre Allinckx	(Japan) Risa Sugimoto (Netherlands) Tessa ter Sluis (Italy) Cristina Tartarone (France) Élise Romba
FairPlay Liechtenstein Open; Vaduz, Liechtenstein; Men: Challenger 3; 16 players - $3,000	11–13 October	(Switzerland) Louai Hafez; 11–9, 11–7, 11–7 (1st PSA title)	(Austria) Aqeel Rehman	(Switzerland) David Bernet (Switzerland) Robin Gadola	(Liechtenstein) David Maier (Switzerland) Joel Siewerdt (Switzerland) Leandro Mannhart (Switzerland) Miguel Mathis
Silicon Valley Open (United States) Redwood City, United States; Men: World Events – Gold; 24 players – $122,000 −−−−−− Women: World Events – Gold; 24 players – $122,000	11–16 October	(Wales) Joel Makin; 12–10, 12–10, 8–11, 11–3 (7th PSA title)	(Egypt) Youssef Soliman	(Egypt) Aly Abou Eleinen (England) Marwan El Shorbagy	(Egypt) Karim Gawad (England) Mohamed El Shorbagy (France) Victor Crouin (Qatar) Abdulla Al-Tamimi
Silicon Valley Open (United States) Redwood City, United States; Men: World Events – Gold; 24 players – $122,000 −−−−−− Women: World Events – Gold; 24 players – $122,000	11–16 October	(United States) Olivia Weaver; 11–4, 11–2, 11–8 (8th PSA title)	(Japan) Satomi Watanabe	(Egypt) Amina Orfi (Malaysia) Sivasangari Subramaniam	(Egypt) Zeina Mickawy (United States) Amanda Sobhy (Egypt) Farida Mohamed (England) Georgina Kennedy
The Hamilton Open (United States) Lancaster, United States; Women: World Events – Copper; 24 players – $32,000	14–18 October	(France) Mélissa Alves; 4–11, 2–11, 11–3, 11–5, 11–4 (9th PSA title)	(Malaysia) Ainaa Amani	(England) Katie Malliff (Wales) Tesni Murphy	(United States) Marina Stefanoni (Egypt) Haya Ali (Wales) Lowri Roberts (Egypt) Nour Heikal
4th Open de Lagord (France) Lagord, France; Men: Challenger 15; 24 players – $15,000 −−−−−− Women: Challenger 15; 24 players – $15,000	15–19 October	(Egypt) Yassin ElShafei; 11–9, 6–11, 11–9, 11–7 (7th PSA title)	(Wales) Emyr Evans	(France) Brice Nicolas (Egypt) Mohamed Nasser	(Egypt) Mazen Gamal (Portugal) Rui Soares (France) Macéo Lévy (India) Abhay Singh
4th Open de Lagord (France) Lagord, France; Men: Challenger 15; 24 players – $15,000 −−−−−− Women: Challenger 15; 24 players – $15,000	15–19 October	(Malaysia) Yee Xin Ying; 11–8, 11–9, 11–2 (5th PSA title)	(Egypt) Nardine Garas	(Egypt) Rana Ismail (Malaysia) Sehveetrraa Kumar	(Egypt) Hana Ismail (India) Akanksha Salunkhe (France) Énora Villard (France) Léa Barbeau
Richardson Wealth Men’s PSA Open (Canada) Vancouver, Canada; Men: World Events – Copper; 24 players – $28,750	16–20 October	(Scotland) Greg Lobban; 11–7, 11–6, 6–11, 11–4 (14th PSA title)	(Mexico) Leonel Cárdenas	(Hong Kong) Lau Tsz Kwan (England) Nick Wall	(Switzerland) Yannick Wilhelmi (India) Veer Chotrani (United States) Shahjahan Khan (Japan) Ryūnosuke Tsukue
La Classique de Gatineau (Canada) Gatineau, Canada; Men: Challenger 3; 16 players – $3,000	17–20 October	(Canada) Elliott Hunt; 5–11, 11–8, 15–17, 11–5, 11–5 (1st PSA title)	(Nigeria) Babatunde Ajagbe	(Canada) Abbas Nawaz (Canada) Maximilien Godbout	(Canada) Wasey Maqsood (Canada) Blake Reinson (Canada) Jayden Shortt (Canada) Mahmoud Abouelleil
Comcast Business U.S. Open (United States) Philadelphia, United States; Men: World Events – Platinum; 32 players – $213,500 −−−−−− Women: World Events – Platinum; 32 players – $213,500	19–26 October	(Egypt) Ali Farag; 11–4, 11–8, 11–4 (42nd PSA title)	(Peru) Diego Elías	(Egypt) Aly Abou Eleinen (Egypt) Mazen Hesham	(New Zealand) Paul Coll (Egypt) Mostafa Asal (Egypt) Youssef Ibrahim (England) Mohamed El Shorbagy
Comcast Business U.S. Open (United States) Philadelphia, United States; Men: World Events – Platinum; 32 players – $213,500 −−−−−− Women: World Events – Platinum; 32 players – $213,500	19–26 October	(Egypt) Nouran Gohar; 11–8, 11–9, 10–12, 11–7 (29th PSA title)	(Egypt) Nour El Sherbini	(United States) Olivia Weaver (Egypt) Hania El Hammamy	(Egypt) Rowan Elaraby (Egypt) Fayrouz Aboelkheir (Belgium) Tinne Gilis (Belgium) Nele Coll
2ème Open PSA Féminin de Couzeix/Limoges (France) Couzeix, France; Women: Challenger 12; 24 players – $12,000	22–26 October	(India) Akanksha Salunkhe; 11–7, 11–7, 11–6 (3rd PSA title)	(Malaysia) Yasshmita Jadishkumar	(Malaysia) Sehveetrraa Kumar (Egypt) Menna Walid	(England) Kiera Marshall (Egypt) Nadien Elhammamy (India) Tanvi Khanna (Egypt) Salma El-Alfy
Swiss Open (Switzerland) Uster, Switzerland; Men: Challenger 6; 16 players – $6,000 −−−−−− Women: Challenger 3; 24 players – $3,000	23–27 October	(Switzerland) David Bernet; 11–8, 8–11, 13–15, 11–3, 11–7 (1st PSA title)	(Switzerland) Robin Gadola	(Austria) Aqeel Rehman (Switzerland) Miguel Mathis	(Liechtenstein) David Maier (Switzerland) Fabian Seitz (Switzerland) Liam Pössl (Switzerland) Louai Hafez
Swiss Open (Switzerland) Uster, Switzerland; Men: Challenger 6; 16 players – $6,000 −−−−−− Women: Challenger 3; 24 players – $3,000	23–27 October	(Switzerland) Nadia Pfister; 11–6, 9–11, 9–11, 11–8, 11–3 (1st PSA title)	(Ecuador) Rafaela Albuja	(Republic of Ireland) Breanne Flynn (Japan) Risa Sugimoto	(Switzerland) Céline Walser (Germany) Maya Weishar (Spain) Sofía Mateos (Malta) Colette Sultana
Canadian Women's Open (Canada) Toronto, Canada; Women: World Events – Silver; 24 players – $88,750	27–31 October	(Belgium) Tinne Gilis; 15–13, 11–4, 11–5 (7th PSA title)	(United States) Amanda Sobhy	(Wales) Tesni Murphy (France) Mélissa Alves	(Egypt) Nada Abbas (Canada) Hollie Naughton (England) Jasmine Hutton (England) Sarah-Jane Perry
Cambridge Group of Clubs Classic (Canada) Toronto, Canada; Men: World Events – Copper; 24 players – $38,750	27–31 October	(Mexico) Leonel Cárdenas; 11–6, 11–7, 11–3 (16th PSA title)	(France) Baptiste Masotti	(Israel) Daniel Poleshchuk (France) Grégoire Marche	(United States) Shahjahan Khan (Canada) Salah Eltorgman (England) Tom Walsh (England) Nick Wall
Philippine Challenger Classic (Philippines) Manila, Philippines; Men: Challenger 3; 24 players – $3,000	28–31 October	(Japan) Tomotaka Endo; 7–11, 11–6, 11–5, 11–4 (3rd PSA title)	(Malaysia) N Moganasundharam	(Japan) Naoki Hayashi (Sri Lanka) Shamil Wakeel	(Philippines) Reymark Begornia (South Korea) Ryu Jeong-uk (Philippines) Robert Garcia (Philippines) David Pelino
China Open; Shanghai, China; Men: World Events – Silver; 24 players – $89,000 −−−−−− Women: World Events – Silver; 24 players – $89,000	30 Oct.–3 Nov.	(England) Mohamed El Shorbagy; 11–6, 12–14, 11–7, 11–9 (50th PSA title)	(Egypt) Mohamed Abouelghar	(Malaysia) Eain Yow (Spain) Iker Pajares	(Egypt) Fares Dessouky (Hong Kong) Alex Lau (Egypt) Mohamad Zakaria (England) Marwan El Shorbagy
China Open; Shanghai, China; Men: World Events – Silver; 24 players – $89,000 −−−−−− Women: World Events – Silver; 24 players – $89,000	30 Oct.–3 Nov.	(Malaysia) Rachel Arnold; 11–5, 11–8, 11–8 (6th PSA title)	(Egypt) Farida Mohamed	(Malaysia) Sivasangari Subramaniam (Malaysia) Aira Azman	(Egypt) Sana Ibrahim (Scotland) Georgia Adderley (Egypt) Rowan Elaraby (Hong Kong) Tomato Ho
PSA Bordeaux–Gradignan (France) Gradignan, France; Men: Challenger 12; 24 players - $12,000	30 Oct.–3 Nov.	(France) Toufik Mekhalfi; 9–11, 11–7, 11–7, 11–5 (2nd PSA title)	(England) Charlie Lee	(England) James Willstrop (Egypt) Ziad Ibrahim	(France) Macéo Lévy (Switzerland) David Bernet (Malaysia) Darren Pragasam (South Africa) Dewald van Niekerk
PSA Club Campestre de Medellín (Colombia) Medellín, Colombia; Men: Challenger 12; 24 players - $12,000	30 Oct.–3 Nov.	(Colombia) Matías Knudsen; 11–9, 11–6, 11–4 (4th PSA title)	(Colombia) Andrés Herrera	(Mexico) Alfredo Ávila (Guatemala) Josué Enríquez	(Mexico) Alejandro Reyes (France) Melvil Scianimanico (Ecuador) Javier Romo (Mexico) Sebastián Salazar
Costa North Coast Open (Australia) Korora, Australia; Men: Challenger 6; 24 players – $6,000 −−−−−− Women: Challenger 6; 24 players – $6,000	30 Oct.–3 Nov.	(Hong Kong) Lam Shing Fung; 11–5, 4–11, 11–4, 11–5 (1st PSA title)	(Hong Kong) To Wai Lok	(Hong Kong) Harley Lam (Australia) Cameron Darton	(Hong Kong) Ho Ka Hei (Malaysia) Ong Sai Hung (Australia) Rhys Dowling (Malaysia) Duncan Lee
Costa North Coast Open (Australia) Korora, Australia; Men: Challenger 6; 24 players – $6,000 −−−−−− Women: Challenger 6; 24 players – $6,000	30 Oct.–3 Nov.	(India) Anahat Singh; 11–6, 11–6, 11–6 (7th PSA title)	(Japan) Akari Midorikawa	(New Zealand) Ella Lash (Hong Kong) Kirstie Wong	(India) Urwashi Joshi (Australia) Madison Lyon (Australia) Rachael Grinham (Hong Kong) Helen Tang
Copa Halloween Temazcal (Mexico) Lomas de Cocoyoc, Mexico; Men: Challenger 3; 24 players – $3,000	30 Oct.–3 Nov.	(Mexico) Jesús Camacho; 11–8, 11–8, 11–6 (6th PSA title)	(Egypt) Shady El Sherbiny	(Mexico) Juan Camacho (Mexico) Wally de los Santos	(Mexico) Alfredo López (Mexico) Bryan Cueto (Mexico) Luis Aquino (Colombia) Felipe Tovar
Monit Czech Open (Czech Republic) Brno, Czech Republic; Men: World Events – Copper; 24 players – $30,000	31 Oct.–4 Nov.	(France) Sébastien Bonmalais; 11–8, 5–11, 11–4, 11–6 (7th PSA title)	(England) Declan James	(England) George Parker (France) Auguste Dussourd	(Scotland) Rory Stewart (Germany) Raphael Kandra (Colombia) Juan Camilo Vargas (Portugal) Rui Soares
Women: Challenger 9; 24 players – $9,000	31 Oct.–4 Nov.	(Egypt) Nour Megahed; 11–8, 11–9, 11–3 (3rd PSA title)	(Hong Kong) Heylie Fung	(Hong Kong) Toby Tse (Austria) Jacqueline Peychär	(France) Lauren Baltayan (Poland) Sofi Zrazhevska (Egypt) Lojayn Gohary (Germany) Katerina Týcová

=== November ===
Tournament	Date	Champion	Runner-Up	Semifinalists	Quarterfinalists
Telsa Media David Lloyd Purley Open (England) Croydon, England; Men: Challenger 3; 16 players – $3,000 −−−−−− Women: Challenger 3; 16 players – $3,000	1–3 November	(England) Sam Osborne-Wylde; 11–4, 11–3, 11–4 (2nd PSA title)	(England) Jared Carter	(England) Noah Meredith (England) Will Salter	(Scotland) Martin Ross (England) Anthony Rogal (England) Abdallah Eissa (Scotland) John Meehan
Telsa Media David Lloyd Purley Open (England) Croydon, England; Men: Challenger 3; 16 players – $3,000 −−−−−− Women: Challenger 3; 16 players – $3,000	1–3 November	(England) Olivia Besant; 6–11, 11–9, 11–5, 8–11, 11–6 (1st PSA title)	(England) Isabel McCullough	(India) Tanishka Jain (Portugal) Sofia Aveiro	(Australia) Erin Classen (England) Lara Newton (Wales) Chloe Foster (Singapore) Wai Lynn Au Yeong
London Open (England) Camden, England; Men: World Events – Copper; 24 players – $33,000	6–10 November	(England) Declan James; 11–3, 11–7, 6–11, 8–11, 11–4 (17th PSA title)	(England) Simon Herbert	(Portugal) Rui Soares (England) Nick Wall	(England) Patrick Rooney (Scotland) Rory Stewart (England) George Parker (France) Auguste Dussourd
Women: Challenger 15; 24 players – $15,000	6–10 November	(Egypt) Nardine Garas; 11–7, 11–5, 11–8 (5th PSA title)	(England) Millie Tomlinson	(Egypt) Hana Ismail (England) Kiera Marshall	(Mexico) Sarahí López (Wales) Lowri Roberts (England) Asia Harris (Austria) Jacqueline Peychär
CDMX Open Tekae Faltami; Mexico City, Mexico; Men: Challenger 15; 24 players – $15,000 −−−−−− Women: Challenger 9; 24 players – $9,000	6–10 November	(Mexico) Jorge Gómez; 11–8, 11–13, 11–4, 11–7 (2nd PSA title)	(Colombia) Matías Knudsen	(Guatemala) Alejandro Enríquez (Spain) Iván Pérez	(France) Melvil Scianimanico (Mexico) Sebastián Salazar (Guatemala) Josué Enríquez (Mexico) Juan Camacho
CDMX Open Tekae Faltami; Mexico City, Mexico; Men: Challenger 15; 24 players – $15,000 −−−−−− Women: Challenger 9; 24 players – $9,000	6–10 November	(Egypt) Habiba Hani; 6–11, 9–11, 12–10, 12–10, 11–8 (4th PSA title)	(Egypt) Amina El Rihany	(Ukraine) Alina Bushma (Netherlands) Tessa ter Sluis	(Mexico) Camila Viveros (Mexico) Diana García (United States) Laila Sedky (Mexico) Paola Franco
White Oaks Classic (Canada) Niagara-on-the-Lake, Canada; Men: Challenger 15; 24 players – $15,000	6–10 November	(India) Veer Chotrani; 11–6, 11–2, 11–9 (5th PSA title)	(Canada) Salah Eltorgman	(Argentina) Jeremías Azaña (Wales) Owain Taylor	(United States) Spencer Lovejoy (Israel) Daniel Poleshchuk (England) Nathan Lake (New Zealand) Lwamba Chileshe
KemTek Kelowna Open (Canada) Kelowna, Canada; Men: Challenger 9; 24 players - $9,000	6–10 November	(Egypt) Mohamed Sharaf; 12–10, 11–9, 2–11, 11–7 (2nd PSA title)	(England) Finnlay Withington	(New Zealand) Elijah Thomas (Hong Kong) Wong Chi Him	(Hong Kong) Matthew Lai (Canada) Elliott Hunt (Canada) Brett Schille (Chile) Matías Lacroix
Alto Pennant Hills NSW Open (Australia) Thornleigh, Australia; Men: Challenger 6; 24 players – $6,000 −−−−−− Women: Challenger 6; 24 players – $6,000	6–10 November	(Malaysia) Duncan Lee; 8–11, 11–7, 11–4, 11–8 (1st PSA title)	(Japan) Tomotaka Endo	(Hong Kong) To Wai Lok (Hong Kong) Harley Lam	(Hong Kong) Lam Shing Fung (Hong Kong) Ho Ka Hei (Australia) Benjamin Ratcliffe (Malaysia) Hafiz Zhafri
Alto Pennant Hills NSW Open (Australia) Thornleigh, Australia; Men: Challenger 6; 24 players – $6,000 −−−−−− Women: Challenger 6; 24 players – $6,000	6–10 November	(India) Anahat Singh; 8–11, 11–6, 11–3, 11–4 (8th PSA title)	(Hong Kong) Helen Tang	(Hong Kong) Kirstie Wong (Hong Kong) Bobo Lam	(South Korea) Song Dong-ju (Hong Kong) Ka Huen Leung (Japan) Akari Midorikawa (New Zealand) Ella Lash
Bern Squash Open (Switzerland) Kehrsatz, Switzerland; Men: Challenger 6; 24 players – $6,000 −−−−−− Women: Challenger 6; 24 players – $6,000	6–10 November	(Switzerland) David Bernet; 11–7, 7–11, 4–11, 11–9, 16–14 (2nd PSA title)	(France) Macéo Lévy	(Wales) Rhys Evans (Egypt) Seif Tamer	(England) Will Salter (Egypt) Omar Elkattan (England) James Peach (Egypt) Ziad Ibrahim
Bern Squash Open (Switzerland) Kehrsatz, Switzerland; Men: Challenger 6; 24 players – $6,000 −−−−−− Women: Challenger 6; 24 players – $6,000	6–10 November	(Egypt) Nour Megahed; 8–11, 11–4, 12–10, 11–5 (4th PSA title)	(Hong Kong) Heylie Fung	(Egypt) Malak Fathy (Hong Kong) Toby Tse	(Switzerland) Ambre Allinckx (Egypt) Nour Ramy (Egypt) Lojayn Gohary (Switzerland) Nadia Pfister
Monte Carlo Classic (Monaco) Fontvieille, Monaco; Women: World Events – Copper; 24 players – $30,000	11–15 November	(Wales) Tesni Murphy; 11–9, 11–9, 12–10 (2nd PSA title)	(England) Sarah-Jane Perry	(India) Joshna Chinappa (England) Lucy Turmel	(Egypt) Hana Ismail (Egypt) Hana Ramadan (Finland) Emilia Soini (England) Alicia Mead
Costa Rica Open; Pozos, Costa Rica; Men: Challenger 15; 24 players – $15,000 −−−−−− Women: Challenger 15; 24 players – $15,000	12–16 November	(Colombia) Ronald Palomino; 11–8, 7–11, 11–3, 11–6 (8th PSA title)	(India) Veer Chotrani	(England) Tom Walsh (England) Sam Osborne-Wylde	(Guatemala) Josué Enríquez (Colombia) Matías Knudsen (Canada) David Baillargeon (United States) Spencer Lovejoy
Costa Rica Open; Pozos, Costa Rica; Men: Challenger 15; 24 players – $15,000 −−−−−− Women: Challenger 15; 24 players – $15,000	12–16 November	(United States) Marina Stefanoni; 11–5, 11–5, 11–4 (9th PSA title)	(France) Marie Stephan	(Egypt) Habiba Hani (Republic of Ireland) Hannah Craig	(Egypt) Amina El Rihany (Colombia) Catalina Peláez (Ukraine) Alina Bushma (England) Amelie Haworth
Open International Niort-Venise Verte (France) Bessines, France; Men: Challenger 15; 24 players – $15,000	12–16 November	(Switzerland) Yannick Wilhelmi; 11–6, 11–4, 11–6 (5th PSA title)	(New Zealand) Lwamba Chileshe	(Scotland) Rory Stewart (France) Macéo Lévy	(Egypt) Yassin ElShafei (Czech Republic) Jakub Solnický (Pakistan) Hamza Khan (France) Paul Gonzalez
BDO Namibian Open (Namibia) Windhoek, Namibia; Men: Challenger 9; 24 players – $9,000	12–16 November	(Egypt) Mohamed Nasser; 11–2, 11–5, 11–2 (3rd PSA title)	(South Africa) Dewald van Niekerk	(Nigeria) Gabriel Olufunmilayo (Egypt) Yusuf Elsherif	(Egypt) Abdalla Hafez (Netherlands) Sam Gerrits (Zimbabwe) Blessing Muhwati (South Africa) Damian Groenewald
Squash Inspire - Charlie Gunn Memorial (United States) Potomac, United States; Women: Challenger 6; 24 players – $6,000	12–16 November	(Egypt) Nour Khafagy; 11–4, 9–11, 11–5, 11–5 (2nd PSA title)	(United States) Madison Ho	(Croatia) Franka Vidović (England) Isabel McCullough	(United States) Laila Sedky (Spain) Noa Romero (Egypt) Sohaila Ismail (United States) Eliza Schuster
BC Open (Canada) Vancouver, Canada; Men: Challenger 3; 24 players - $3,000	14–16 November	(Canada) Liam Marrison; 11–5, 11–7, 8–11, 10–12, 11–2 (2nd PSA title)	(Mexico) Guillermo Cortés	(Canada) Abbas Nawaz (Chile) Matías Lacroix	(Canada) Ryan Picken (Canada) Wasey Maqsood (Bermuda) Taylor Carrick (Nigeria) Kehinde Temitope
ACE Malaysia Squash Cup; Petaling Jaya, Malaysia; Men: World Events – Bronze; 24 players – $64,000 −−−−−− Women: World Events – Bronze; 24 players – $64,000	12–17 November	(Malaysia) Eain Yow; 11–7, 11–7, 11–7 (8th PSA title)	(Egypt) Youssef Soliman	(Egypt) Youssef Ibrahim (India) Abhay Singh	(India) Velavan Senthilkumar (India) Ramit Tandon (Colombia) Juan Camilo Vargas (Spain) Bernat Jaume
ACE Malaysia Squash Cup; Petaling Jaya, Malaysia; Men: World Events – Bronze; 24 players – $64,000 −−−−−− Women: World Events – Bronze; 24 players – $64,000	12–17 November	(Egypt) Amina Orfi; 8–11, 11–9, 12–10, 8–11, 11–6 (5th PSA title)	(Malaysia) Sivasangari Subramaniam	(Malaysia) Rachel Arnold (Scotland) Georgia Adderley	(England) Katie Malliff (Malaysia) Aira Azman (Malaysia) Aifa Azman (Egypt) Kenzy Ayman
Lausanne Open (Switzerland) Renens, Switzerland; Men: Challenger 6; 24 players – $6,000	13–17 November	(Republic of Ireland) Sam Buckley; 11–3, 11–8, 6–11, 11–8 (2nd PSA title)	(Switzerland) David Bernet	(Switzerland) Robin Gadola (Hong Kong) Tang Ming Hong	(Egypt) Abdelrahman Abdelkhalek (Hong Kong) Leo Chung (Egypt) Mohamed Gohar (Egypt) Omar Elkattan
Bondi Open (Australia) Bondi Junction, Australia; Men: Challenger 3; 24 players – $3,000 −−−−−− Women: Challenger 3; 16 players – $3,000	13–17 November	(Malaysia) Muhammad Azhar; 11–9, 6–11, 11–5, 11–6 (1st PSA title)	(Malta) Kijan Sultana	(New Zealand) Oliver Dunbar (Australia) James Nicholas	(Australia) Javed Ali (Australia) Caleb Johnson (Australia) Cameron Darton (Sri Lanka) Tuwin Nilakshana
Bondi Open (Australia) Bondi Junction, Australia; Men: Challenger 3; 24 players – $3,000 −−−−−− Women: Challenger 3; 16 players – $3,000	13–17 November	(Australia) Madison Lyon; 3–11, 11–6, 11–8, 11–7 (2nd PSA title)	(South Korea) Heo Min-gyeong	(India) Urwashi Joshi (New Zealand) Jena Gregory	(New Zealand) Ella Lash (Australia) Remashree Muniandy (Malaysia) Anrie Goh (South Korea) Song Dong-ju
Oban Open (Scotland) Oban, Scotland; Men: Challenger 3; 24 players – $3,000	15–17 November	(Spain) Edmon López; 11–7, 12–10, 11–4 (12th PSA title)	(Scotland) Rory Richmond	(Scotland) Martin Ross (Australia) Connor Hayes	(Australia) Bradley Fullick (Scotland) Andrew Glen (Czech Republic) Marek Panáček (Poland) Jakub Pytlowany
CAS Serena Hotels International (Pakistan) Islamabad, Pakistan; Men: Challenger 15; 24 players – $15,000	18–22 November	(Pakistan) Noor Zaman; 11–8, 12–10, 11–9 (2nd PSA title)	(Pakistan) Nasir Iqbal	(Egypt) Ibrahim Elkabbani (Pakistan) Ashab Irfan	(England) Perry Malik (Netherlands) Rowan Damming (Egypt) Seif Shenawy (Malaysia) Darren Pragasam
Chestnut Hill Classic (United States) Philadelphia, United States; Women: World Events – Bronze; 24 players – $53,750	19–23 November	(United States) Olivia Weaver; 11–5, 11–7, 11–2 (9th PSA title)	(United States) Marina Stefanoni	(Egypt) Nour Aboulmakarim (France) Marie Stephan	(England) Lucy Beecroft (Malaysia) Yee Xin Ying (Republic of Ireland) Hannah Craig (England) Saran Nghiem
Simply the Brest Open (France) Brest, France; Men: Challenger 12; 24 players – $12,000	19–23 November	(France) Brice Nicolas; 8–11, 11–5, 7–11, 11–5, 11–4 (2nd PSA title)	(France) Toufik Mekhalfi	(Egypt) Khaled Labib (Egypt) Ziad Ibrahim	(France) Baptiste Bouin (Switzerland) David Bernet (Hong Kong) Leo Chung (England) Simon Herbert
Squash Inspire - Men’s $6K Challenger (United States) Columbia, United States; Men: Challenger 6; 24 players – $6,000	19–23 November	(Nigeria) Onaopemipo Adegoke; 11–5, 9–11, 14–12, 9–11, 11–3 (2nd PSA title)	(India) Yash Bhargava	(India) Abhishek Agarwal (Pakistan) Ahsan Ayaz	(Mexico) Leo Vargas (Egypt) Omar Elkattan (United States) Waleed Khalil (England) Mark Broekman
Club Rancho San Francisco Open (Ecuador) Quito, Ecuador; Men: Challenger 6; 24 players – $6,000 −−−−−− Women: Challenger 6; 16 players – $6,000	19–23 November	(Ecuador) Álvaro Buenaño; 13–11, 11–7, 11–2 (1st PSA title)	(Ecuador) Javier Romo	(Colombia) Edgar Ramírez (Egypt) Adam Hawal	(Paraguay) Francesco Marcantonio (Guatemala) Sebastián Fonseca (Colombia) José Santamaría (Colombia) Carlos Buenaño
Club Rancho San Francisco Open (Ecuador) Quito, Ecuador; Men: Challenger 6; 24 players – $6,000 −−−−−− Women: Challenger 6; 16 players – $6,000	19–23 November	(Egypt) Barb Sameh; 11–5, 11–5, 11–4 (2nd PSA title)	(Mexico) Diana García	(Colombia) Lucía Bautista (Mexico) Sarahí López	(Colombia) Laura Tovar (Ecuador) Caridad Buenaño (Brazil) Luiza Carbonieri (Ecuador) María José Soria
VITAGEN Singapore Squash Open; Kallang, Singapore; Men: World Events – Gold; 24 players – $120,000 −−−−−− Women: World Events – Gold; 24 players – $120,000	19–24 November	(Egypt) Ali Farag; 6–11, 7–11, 11–8, 11–1, 11–4 (43rd PSA title)	(Peru) Diego Elías	(New Zealand) Paul Coll (Malaysia) Eain Yow	(France) Victor Crouin (Egypt) Youssef Ibrahim (Hungary) Balázs Farkas (Egypt) Mohamad Zakaria
VITAGEN Singapore Squash Open; Kallang, Singapore; Men: World Events – Gold; 24 players – $120,000 −−−−−− Women: World Events – Gold; 24 players – $120,000	19–24 November	(Egypt) Amina Orfi; 9–11, 11–9, 11–13, 11–1, 11–9 (6th PSA title)	(Egypt) Hania El Hammamy	(Malaysia) Sivasangari Subramaniam (Belgium) Tinne Gilis	(Egypt) Fayrouz Aboelkheir (England) Katie Malliff (Egypt) Sana Ibrahim (Belgium) Nele Coll
QSF No.5 (Qatar) Doha, Qatar; Men: World Events – Bronze; 24 players – $60,500	20–24 November	(Egypt) Tarek Momen; 2–11, 11–5, 11–9, 11–7 (11th PSA title)	(Egypt) Aly Abou Eleinen	(Qatar) Abdulla Al-Tamimi (Colombia) Miguel Á Rodríguez	(Egypt) Mohamed Abouelghar (Japan) Ryūnosuke Tsukue (France) Grégoire Marche (England) Ben Smith
St. Louis Open (United States) St. Louis, United States; Men: Challenger 15; 24 players – $15,000	20–24 November	(Argentina) Jeremías Azaña; 11–7, 11–3, 10–12, 12–10 (2nd PSA title)	(England) Tom Walsh	(England) Nathan Lake (Colombia) Ronald Palomino	(United States) Timothy Brownell (England) Lewis Anderson (Egypt) Mohamed Nabil (Guatemala) Josué Enríquez
PVD Rhode Island Open (United States) Providence, United States; Men: Challenger 6; 24 players – $6,000	20–24 November	(Egypt) Mohamed Sharaf; 11–8, 11–9, 12–10 (3rd PSA title)	(Republic of Ireland) Sam Buckley	(Egypt) Ali El Toukhy (Republic of Ireland) Denis Gilevskiy	(France) Manuel Paquemar (Hungary) Benedek Takács (Colombia) Mateo Restrepo (Malaysia) Andrik Lim
JSW 10th Sunil Verma Memorial Open (India) Vasind, India; Men: Challenger 6; 24 players – $6,000 −−−−−− Women: Challenger 3; 24 players – $3,000	20–24 November	(India) Suraj Chand; 11–6, 11–6, 11–9 (3rd PSA title)	(Sri Lanka) Ravindu Laksiri	(Egypt) Kareem Badawi (Hong Kong) Harley Lam	(India) Om Semwal (India) Rahul Baitha (Malaysia) Tay Jun Qian (Egypt) Islam Kouritam
JSW 10th Sunil Verma Memorial Open (India) Vasind, India; Men: Challenger 6; 24 players – $6,000 −−−−−− Women: Challenger 3; 24 players – $3,000	20–24 November	(India) Anahat Singh; 11–4, 11–3, 11–1 (9th PSA title)	(India) Shameena Riaz	(India) Pooja Arthi (Iran) Fereshteh Eghtedari	(India) Urwashi Joshi (Malta) Colette Sultana (India) Sunita Patel (India) Anjali Semwal
Cape Town Squash Open (South Africa) Cape Town, South Africa; Men: World Events – Copper; 24 players – $25,000 −−−−−− Women: World Events – Copper; 24 players – $25,000	26–30 November	(Qatar) Abdulla Al-Tamimi; 15–13, 11–5, 11–6 (11th PSA title)	(England) Declan James	(Egypt) Karim El Hammamy (Egypt) Omar Mosaad	(Pakistan) Noor Zaman (Pakistan) Asim Khan (Scotland) Rory Stewart (South Africa) Dewald van Niekerk
Cape Town Squash Open (South Africa) Cape Town, South Africa; Men: World Events – Copper; 24 players – $25,000 −−−−−− Women: World Events – Copper; 24 players – $25,000	26–30 November	(France) Mélissa Alves; 12–10, 11–5, 11–7 (10th PSA title)	(Egypt) Nour Heikal	(South Africa) Alexandra Fuller (Egypt) Nour Khafagy	(Egypt) Nardine Garas (South Africa) Hayley Ward (Egypt) Mariam Metwally (Switzerland) Cindy Merlo
Arrayanes Country Club Open (Ecuador) Puembo, Ecuador; Men: Challenger 6; 24 players - $6,000 −−−−−− Women: Challenger 6; 16 players – $6,000	26–30 November	(Ecuador) Álvaro Buenaño; 11–6, 11–7, 1–11, 5–11, 11–9 (2nd PSA title)	(Ecuador) Javier Romo	(Egypt) Adam Hawal (Paraguay) Francesco Marcantonio	(Colombia) Edgar Ramírez (Mexico) Sebastián Salazar (Colombia) Felipe Tovar (Ecuador) Ernesto Dávila
Arrayanes Country Club Open (Ecuador) Puembo, Ecuador; Men: Challenger 6; 24 players - $6,000 −−−−−− Women: Challenger 6; 16 players – $6,000	26–30 November	(Egypt) Barb Sameh; 11–6, 11–8, 12–10 (3rd PSA title)	(Mexico) Diana García	(Colombia) Lucía Bautista (Mexico) Sarahí López	(Ecuador) Rafaela García (Colombia) Laura Tovar (Ecuador) Rafaela Albuja (Ecuador) Caridad Buenaño
PSA des Hauts-de-France; Wambrechies, France; Men: Challenger 12; 24 players – $12,000 −−−−−− Women: Challenger 12; 24 players – $12,000	27 Nov.–1 Dec.	(Switzerland) Yannick Wilhelmi; 14–12, 11–6, 11–9 (6th PSA title)	(France) Edwin Clain	(Egypt) Khaled Labib (Hong Kong) Matthew Lai	(France) Brice Nicolas (England) Perry Malik (France) Macéo Lévy (Egypt) Hazem Hossam
PSA des Hauts-de-France; Wambrechies, France; Men: Challenger 12; 24 players – $12,000 −−−−−− Women: Challenger 12; 24 players – $12,000	27 Nov.–1 Dec.	(France) Camille Serme; 11–7, 7–11, 11–2, 11–2 (16th PSA title)	(England) Torrie Malik	(Egypt) Nadien Elhammamy (Hong Kong) Heylie Fung	(Malaysia) Yee Xin Ying (France) Kara Lincou (Hong Kong) Toby Tse (France) Ana Munos
Worker Bee/Olliers Solicitors Northern Open (England) Manchester, England; Men: Challenger 12; 24 players – $12,000 −−−−−− Women: Challenger 12; 24 players – $12,000	27 Nov.–1 Dec.	(England) Nick Wall; 11–7, 8–11, 5–11, 11–8, 11–5 (10th PSA title)	(Wales) Emyr Evans	(Portugal) Rui Soares (England) Sam Osborne-Wylde	(Malaysia) Ameeshenraj Chandaran (England) Finnlay Withington (England) James Peach (England) Robert Downer
Worker Bee/Olliers Solicitors Northern Open (England) Manchester, England; Men: Challenger 12; 24 players – $12,000 −−−−−− Women: Challenger 12; 24 players – $12,000	27 Nov.–1 Dec.	(Egypt) Zeina Zein; 7–11, 11–5, 12–14, 11–2, 11–6 (3rd PSA title)	(Malaysia) Yasshmita Jadishkumar	(Egypt) Nour Megahed (Republic of Ireland) Breanne Flynn	(England) Asia Harris (England) Kiera Marshall (England) Isabel McCullough (Japan) Akari Midorikawa

=== December ===
Tournament	Date	Champion	Runner-Up	Semifinalists	Quarterfinalists
QSF No.6 PSA Challenger (Qatar) Doha, Qatar; Men: Challenger 3; 16 players – $3,000	2–5 December	(Kuwait) Abdullah Al-Muzayen; 11–2, 11–6, 11–4 (23rd PSA title)	(Egypt) Seif Heikal	(Qatar) Yousef Farag (Iran) Pouya Shafieifard	(Qatar) Waleed Zaman (Qatar) Salem Al-Malki (Bahrain) Yousif Thani (Kuwait) Saleh Altawari
Milwaukee Hong Kong Open; Hong Kong, China; Men: World Events – Platinum; 32 players - $207,500 −−−−−− Women : World Events – Platinum; 32 players - $207,500	2–8 December	(Egypt) Mostafa Asal; 11–5, 4–11, 11–8, 11–5 (18th PSA title)	(Egypt) Ali Farag	(Peru) Diego Elías (Wales) Joel Makin	(Egypt) Youssef Ibrahim (New Zealand) Paul Coll (Egypt) Mazen Hesham (Egypt) Tarek Momen
Milwaukee Hong Kong Open; Hong Kong, China; Men: World Events – Platinum; 32 players - $207,500 −−−−−− Women : World Events – Platinum; 32 players - $207,500	2–8 December	(Egypt) Nouran Gohar; 6–11, 11–5, 11–9, 11–9 (30th PSA title)	(Egypt) Nour El Sherbini	(Egypt) Hania El Hammamy (United States) Olivia Weaver	(Belgium) Tinne Gilis (Egypt) Sana Ibrahim (Egypt) Rowan Elaraby (Belgium) Nele Coll
Madeira International (Portugal) Caniço, Portugal; Men: Challenger 15; 24 players – $15,000 −−−−−− Women: Challenger 6; 24 players – $6,000	4–8 December	(England) Charlie Lee; 11–6, 11–9, 11–7 (5th PSA title)	(Netherlands) Rowan Damming	(Egypt) Moustafa El Sirty (Pakistan) Hamza Khan	(New Zealand) Temwa Chileshe (France) Lucas Serme (New Zealand) Elijah Thomas (England) Noah Meredith
Madeira International (Portugal) Caniço, Portugal; Men: Challenger 15; 24 players – $15,000 −−−−−− Women: Challenger 6; 24 players – $6,000	4–8 December	(Singapore) Wai Yhann Au Yeong; 11–7, 9–11, 11–4, 7–11, 11–7 (2nd PSA title)	(England) Isabel McCullough	(Czech Republic) Anna Serme (England) Kiera Marshall	(England) Olivia Besant (Portugal) Catarina Nunes (Ukraine) Alina Bushma (Portugal) Sofia Aveiro
Boston Open (England) Boston, England; Men: Challenger 3; 24 players – $3,000 −−−−−− Women: Challenger 3; 16 players – $3,000	6–8 December	(England) Bailey Malik; 7–11, 11–8, 11–9, 11–5 (1st PSA title)	(Scotland) Rory Richmond	(England) Jack Mitterer (Wales) Lewis Poole	(England) Will Salter (Australia) David Turner (New Zealand) Joel Arscott (Wales) Ioan Sharpe
Boston Open (England) Boston, England; Men: Challenger 3; 24 players – $3,000 −−−−−− Women: Challenger 3; 16 players – $3,000	6–8 December	(Australia) Sophie Fadaely; 11–5, 11–4, 11–8 (1st PSA title)	(England) Katie Wells	(England) Jasmin Kalar (England) Polly Clark	(England) Lara Newton (Scotland) Carys Jones (Wales) Ellie Breach (Japan) Ayumi Watanabe
II PSA AnyósPark (Andorra) Anyós, Andorra; Men: Challenger 3; 16 players – $3,000	11–13 December	(Argentina) Miguel Pujol; 11–6, 11–7, 11–3 (2nd PSA title)	(Belgium) Joeri Hapers	(France) Antonin Romieu (Spain) Nilo Vidal	(Spain) Hugo Jaén (Spain) Ignacio Fajardo (Spain) Ernesto Revert (England) Matt Gregory
Harrogate Squash Open (England) Harrogate, England; Men: Challenger 3; 24 players – $3,000	12–15 December	(England) James Willstrop; 11–6, 11–7, 11–8 (23rd PSA title)	(England) Bailey Malik	(England) Will Salter (England) Heston Malik	(Australia) David Turner (Denmark) Theis Houlberg (Scotland) John Meehan (England) Lewis Doughty
79 CCI Western India; Mumbai, India; Men: Challenger 9; 24 players – $9,000 −−−−−− Women: Challenger 9; 24 players – $9,000	18–22 December	(Malaysia) Ameeshenraj Chandaran; 15–13, 6–11, 11–5, 11–3 (3rd PSA title)	(Czech Republic) Viktor Byrtus	(Netherlands) Rowan Damming (India) Veer Chotrani	(Sri Lanka) Ravindu Laksiri (India) Rahul Baitha (Hong Kong) To Wai Lok (Egypt) Yassin Shohdy
79 CCI Western India; Mumbai, India; Men: Challenger 9; 24 players – $9,000 −−−−−− Women: Challenger 9; 24 players – $9,000	18–22 December	(India) Anahat Singh; 11–8, 11–8, 11–8 (10th PSA title)	(India) Akanksha Salunkhe	(Egypt) Jana Swaify (Egypt) Nour Khafagy	(Hong Kong) Bobo Lam (Hong Kong) Kirstie Wong (India) Anjali Semwal (Hong Kong) Wai Sze Wing
Georgia Open (United States) Atlanta, United States; Men: Challenger 9; 24 players – $9,000	18–22 December	(Egypt) Omar Sobhy; 11–3, 9–11, 11–4, 11–3 (1st PSA title)	(Mexico) Jorge Gómez	(Guatemala) Alejandro Enríquez (Egypt) Karim Elbarbary	(United States) Bransten Ming (United States) Salim Khan (Egypt) Shady El Sherbiny (Nigeria) Kehinde Temitope
Abu Dhabi Racket Club Open (United Arab Emirates) Abu Dhabi, United Arab Emirates; Men: Challenger 15; 24 players – $15,000	23–27 December	(Egypt) Moustafa El Sirty; 3–11, 11–6, 11–6, 8–11, 11–5 (18th PSA title)	(Egypt) Ibrahim Elkabbani	(Japan) Tomotaka Endo (Egypt) Ziad Ibrahim	(Egypt) Hazem Hossam (Egypt) Seif Shenawy (Egypt) Omar Elkattan (Egypt) Khaled Labib

=== January ===
Tournament	Date	Champion	Runner-Up	Semifinalists	Quarterfinalists
Squash In The Land (United States) Cleveland, United States; Men: World Events – Silver; 24 players – $88,750 −−−−−− Women: World Events – Silver; 24 players – $88,750	14–19 January	(England) Marwan El Shorbagy; 11–4, 11–6, 11–6 (15th PSA title)	(Egypt) Tarek Momen	(Egypt) Karim Gawad (England) Mohamed El Shorbagy	(Qatar) Abdulla Al-Tamimi (England) George Parker (England) Jonah Bryant (Egypt) Youssef Ibrahim
Squash In The Land (United States) Cleveland, United States; Men: World Events – Silver; 24 players – $88,750 −−−−−− Women: World Events – Silver; 24 players – $88,750	14–19 January	(Japan) Satomi Watanabe; 11-8, 11-8, 11-6 (10th PSA title)	(United States) Amanda Sobhy	(Egypt) Amina Orfi (Egypt) Rowan Elaraby	(Wales) Tesni Murphy (Egypt) Farida Mohamed (England) Georgina Kennedy (Egypt) Nada Abbas
Gas City ProAm (Canada) Medicine Hat, Canada; Men: Challenger 6; 24 players - $6,000	22–26 January	(England) Sam Todd; 11–6, 11–5, 2–0^{rtd.} (6th PSA title)	(Egypt) Abdelrahman Nassar	(Egypt) Shady El Sherbiny (Canada) Brett Schille	(Canada) Elliott Hunt (Ecuador) Javier Romo (Canada) Karim Aguib (Canada) Maximilien Godbout
J.P. Morgan Tournament of Champions (United States) New York City, United States; Men: World Events – Platinum; 32 players – $219,000 −−−−−− Women: World Events – Platinum; 32 players – $219,000	23–30 January	(Egypt) Ali Farag; 9–11, 12–10, 14–12, 11–1 (44th PSA title)	(Peru) Diego Elías	(Egypt) Mostafa Asal (New Zealand) Paul Coll	(England) Mohamed El Shorbagy (Wales) Joel Makin (France) Grégoire Marche (Egypt) Tarek Momen
J.P. Morgan Tournament of Champions (United States) New York City, United States; Men: World Events – Platinum; 32 players – $219,000 −−−−−− Women: World Events – Platinum; 32 players – $219,000	23–30 January	(Egypt) Hania El Hammamy; 8–11, 11–8, 3–11, 11-6, 11–8 (14th PSA title)	(Egypt) Nouran Gohar	(United States) Olivia Weaver (Egypt) Nour El Sherbini	(Egypt) Rowan Elaraby (Egypt) Amina Orfi (Belgium) Tinne Gilis (England) Jasmine Hutton
Carol Weymuller Open (United States) New York City, United States; Women: World Events – Bronze; 24 players – $53,750	29 Jan.–2 Feb.	(Egypt) Fayrouz Aboelkheir; 11–7, 11–9, 12–10 (4th PSA title)	(Egypt) Nada Abbas	(England) Sarah-Jane Perry (Egypt) Farida Mohamed	(Malaysia) Rachel Arnold (Egypt) Salma Hany (France) Mélissa Alves (Canada) Hollie Naughton
Mossel Bay Diaz Open (South Africa) Mossel Bay, South Africa; Men: Challenger 3; 24 players – $3,000	30 Jan.–2 Feb.	(South Africa) Dewald van Niekerk; 11–8, 11–6, 13–11 (7th PSA title)	(South Africa) Damian Groenewald	(South Africa) Diodivine Mkhize (South Africa) Luhann Groenewald	(Namibia) Arno Diekmann (South Africa) Tristen Worth (South Africa) John Anderson (South Africa) Hayden Worth
BrightPath Foundations Open (United States) Garland, United States; Women: Challenger 3; 16 players – $3,000	30 Jan.–2 Feb.	(United States) Laila Sedky; 11–6, 11–4, 11–7 (1st PSA title)	(Singapore) Cassandra Ong	(Poland) Karina Tyma (Mexico) Diana García	(Guyana) Mary Fung-A-Fat (Pakistan) Sana Bahadar (Pakistan) Mehwish Ali (Pakistan) Sameera Shahid

=== February ===
Tournament	Date	Champion	Runner-Up	Semifinalists	Quarterfinalists
DR21 Motor City Open (United States) Bloomfield Hills, United States; Men: World Events – Silver; 24 players – $82,000	4–8 February	(New Zealand) Paul Coll; 8–11, 12–10, 11–9, 11–9 (26th PSA title)	(Mexico) Leonel Cárdenas	(Egypt) Aly Abou Eleinen (Malaysia) Eain Yow	(Switzerland) Dimitri Steinmann (France) Baptiste Masotti (Egypt) Mohamed ElSherbini (Colombia) Juan Camilo Vargas
Cincinnati Gaynor Cup (United States) Cincinnati, United States; Women: World Events – Silver; 24 players – $78,750	5–9 February	(Malaysia) Sivasangari Subramaniam; 11–7, 6–11, 7–11, 11–7, 11–4 (15th PSA title)	(United States) Amanda Sobhy	(England) Jasmine Hutton (United States) Olivia Weaver	(Egypt) Fayrouz Aboelkheir (England) Torrie Malik (Egypt) Salma Hany (Malaysia) Rachel Arnold
Life Time Chicago Open (United States) Vernon Hills, United States; Men: Challenger 15; 24 players - $15,000	5–9 February	(England) Sam Todd; 11–6, 10–12, 11–8, 11–4 (7th PSA title)	(Egypt) Karim El Hammamy	(United States) Shahjahan Khan (Colombia) Matías Knudsen	(Guatemala) Alejandro Enríquez (India) Veer Chotrani (Egypt) Abdelrahman Nassar (Egypt) Aly Hussein
PSA West Coast Cup (Norway) Bergen, Norway; Men: Challenger 3; 24 players - $3,000 −−−−−− Women: Challenger 3; 16 players - $3,000	7–9 February	(England) Will Salter; 11–4, 11–8, 11–1 (1st PSA title)	(Egypt) Abdelrahman Abdelkhalek	(Brazil) Guilherme Melo (England) Noah Meredith	(France) Antonin Romieu (Wales) Ioan Sharpe (Poland) Kajetan Lipski (Denmark) Theis Houlberg
PSA West Coast Cup (Norway) Bergen, Norway; Men: Challenger 3; 24 players - $3,000 −−−−−− Women: Challenger 3; 16 players - $3,000	7–9 February	(Italy) Cristina Tartarone; 11–2, 11–0, 11–5 (2nd PSA title)	(Portugal) Catarina Nunes	(Ecuador) Rafaela Albuja (New Zealand) Kaitlyn Watts	(Denmark) Caroline Lyng (England) Jasmine Thirst (Norway) Norah Fjellgaard (Slovenia) Pika Rupar
DJED - SSA Challenger Tournament (Egypt) Cairo, Egypt; Men: Challenger 3; 16 players - $3,000	9–12 February	(Egypt) Yassin Shohdy; 13–15, 11–5, 11–7, 11–6 (4th PSA title)	(Egypt) Seif Tamer	(Egypt) Mohamed Gohar (Egypt) Taha ElShafei	(Egypt) Islam Kouritam (Egypt) Mahmoud Ahmed (Egypt) Ahmed Sherif (Egypt) Youssef Kabbash
Pittsburgh Open (United States) Pittsburgh, United States; Men: World Events – Silver; 24 players - $86,000	12–16 February	(Wales) Joel Makin; 9–11, 11–8, 11–9, 11–7 (8th PSA title)	(Egypt) Youssef Ibrahim	(Egypt) Youssef Soliman (Peru) Diego Elías	(Switzerland) Dimitri Steinmann (France) Victor Crouin (France) Sébastien Bonmalais (Scotland) Greg Lobban
Pembroke Open de Montreal (Canada) Montreal, Canada; Men: Challenger 15; 24 players – $15,000	12–16 February	(Germany) Raphael Kandra; 11–9, 11–9, 11–7 (16th PSA title)	(Canada) David Baillargeon	(Egypt) Kareem El Torkey (Argentina) Jeremías Azaña	(England) Sam Osborne-Wylde (England) Curtis Malik (Mexico) Alfredo Ávila (France) Toufik Mekhalfi
Brno Open (Czech Republic) Brno, Czech Republic; Men: Challenger 3; 16 players - $3,000 −−−−−− Women: Challenger 3; 16 players - $3,000	17–20 February	(Czech Republic) Jakub Solnický; 4–11, 11–5, 11–2, 9–11, 11–6 (4th PSA title)	(England) Robert Downer	(Czech Republic) Marek Panáček (Czech Republic) Daniel Mekbib	(Czech Republic) Martin Štěpán (Germany) Heiko Schwarzer (Poland) Jakub Pytlowany (Czech Republic) Martin Švec
Brno Open (Czech Republic) Brno, Czech Republic; Men: Challenger 3; 16 players - $3,000 −−−−−− Women: Challenger 3; 16 players - $3,000	17–20 February	(Czech Republic) Karolína Šrámková; 11–4, 9–11, 11–9, 12–10 (1st PSA title)	(Czech Republic) Michaela Čepová	(Czech Republic) Anna Serme (Czech Republic) Tamara Holzbauerová	(Poland) Sofi Zrazhevska (Slovenia) Pika Rupar (Ukraine) Milena Velychko (Czech Republic) Tereza Široká
McMillan Goodfellow Classic; Toronto, Canada; Men : Challenger 15; 24 players - $15,000	18–22 February	(Egypt) Kareem El Torkey; 11–3, 6–11, 11–6, 17–15 (5th PSA title)	(England) Tom Walsh	(Israel) Daniel Poleshchuk (Malaysia) Sanjay Jeeva	(France) Toufik Mekhalfi (Canada) David Baillargeon (Canada) Salah Eltorgman (England) Finnlay Withington
Cotidie Texas Open (United States) Houston, United States; Men: World Events – Gold; 24 players – $111,000 −−−−−− Women: World Events – Gold; 24 players – $111,000	18–23 February	(Egypt) Ali Farag; 11–9, 11–4, 0–0^{rtd.} (45th PSA title)	(Egypt) Mostafa Asal	(France) Victor Crouin (England) Marwan El Shorbagy	(Egypt) Aly Abou Eleinen (Wales) Joel Makin (France) Grégoire Marche (Malaysia) Eain Yow
Cotidie Texas Open (United States) Houston, United States; Men: World Events – Gold; 24 players – $111,000 −−−−−− Women: World Events – Gold; 24 players – $111,000	18–23 February	(Egypt) Nouran Gohar; 11–8, 5–11, 11–6, 11–9 (31st PSA title)	(Egypt) Hania El Hammamy	(Egypt) Nour El Sherbini (Belgium) Tinne Gilis	(Egypt) Nada Abbas (Egypt) Salma Hany (Egypt) Rowan Elaraby (Egypt) Farida Mohamed
Octane Sydney Classic (Australia) Caringbah, Australia; Men: Challenger 6; 24 players - $6,000	19–23 February	(India) Saurav Ghosal; 11–2, 11–6, 11–2 (11th PSA title)	(Egypt) Abdelrahman Nassar	(Australia) Rhys Dowling (Malaysia) Bryan Lim	(Hong Kong) Leo Chung (Australia) Nicholas Calvert (Hong Kong) Andes Ling (South Korea) Lee Min-woo
QSF No.2 (Qatar) Doha, Qatar; Men: World Events – Bronze; 24 players – $60,500	24–28 February	(Egypt) Karim Gawad; 11–4, 10–12, 11–4, 8–11, 11–4 (29th PSA title)	(Egypt) Tarek Momen	(Egypt) Fares Dessouky (England) Declan James	(Egypt) Mohamad Zakaria (Qatar) Abdulla Al-Tamimi (Egypt) Yahya Elnawasany (France) Sébastien Bonmalais
AirSprint Canadian Men's Open (Canada) Calgary, Canada; Men: World Events – Bronze; 24 players – $68,500	24–28 February	(England) Mohamed El Shorbagy; 11–5, 11–5, 11–7 (51st PSA title)	(Mexico) Leonel Cárdenas	(France) Victor Crouin (Switzerland) Dimitri Steinmann	(England) Nathan Lake (England) Nick Wall (Egypt) Omar Mosaad (France) Grégoire Marche
PSA Hollolan Kuntokeidas (Finland) Hollola, Finland; Men: Challenger 12; 24 players – $12,000	25 Feb.–1 Mar.	(England) Sam Osborne-Wylde; 7–11, 11–7, 15–13, 2–11, 12–10 (3rd PSA title)	(France) Toufik Mekhalfi	(Egypt) Mohamed Nasser (France) Edwin Clain	(Spain) Iván Pérez (Malaysia) Ameeshenraj Chandaran (Republic of Ireland) Sam Buckley (Malaysia) Darren Pragasam
Bricomarché Pestka Poznań Open (Poland) Poznań, Poland; Men: Challenger 6; 24 players - $6,000	25 Feb.–1 Mar.	(Czech Republic) Jakub Solnický; 11–5, 11–9, 11–5 (5th PSA title)	(Egypt) Yassin Shohdy	(Wales) Rhys Evans (Czech Republic) Daniel Mekbib	(England) James Peach (Czech Republic) Viktor Byrtus (Netherlands) Rowan Damming (New Zealand) Elijah Thomas

=== March ===
Tournament	Date	Champion	Runner-Up	Semifinalists	Quarterfinalists
Odense Open (Denmark) Odense, Denmark; Men: Challenger 9; 24 players – $9,000 −−−−−− Women: Challenger 9; 24 players – $9,000	4–8 March	(France) Toufik Mekhalfi; 11–8, 11–4, 11–2 (3rd PSA title)	(Republic of Ireland) Sam Buckley	(Czech Republic) Viktor Byrtus (Spain) Iván Pérez	(Wales) Emyr Evans (South Africa) Dewald van Niekerk (Hong Kong) Wong Chi Him (Malaysia) Darren Pragasam
Odense Open (Denmark) Odense, Denmark; Men: Challenger 9; 24 players – $9,000 −−−−−− Women: Challenger 9; 24 players – $9,000	4–8 March	(Scotland) Lisa Aitken; 3–11, 11–4, 9–11, 11–8, 11–7 (7th PSA title)	(France) Lauren Baltayan	(India) Tanvi Khanna (Egypt) Nour Megahed	(England) Asia Harris (England) Kiera Marshall (Hong Kong) Helen Tang (Wales) Lowri Roberts
New Zealand Open; Christchurch, New Zealand; Men: World Events – Silver; 24 players – $93,000 −−−−−− Women: World Events – Silver; 24 players – $93,000	4–9 March	(New Zealand) Paul Coll; 11–5, 8–11, 11–6, 11–3 (27th PSA title)	(England) Marwan El Shorbagy	(France) Baptiste Masotti (Malaysia) Eain Yow	(France) Auguste Dussourd (France) Sébastien Bonmalais (Spain) Iker Pajares (Malaysia) Sanjay Jeeva
New Zealand Open; Christchurch, New Zealand; Men: World Events – Silver; 24 players – $93,000 −−−−−− Women: World Events – Silver; 24 players – $93,000	4–9 March	(Egypt) Amina Orfi; 11–5, 11–8, 11–5 (7th PSA title)	(Japan) Satomi Watanabe	(Egypt) Salma Hany (Egypt) Rowan Elaraby	(Belgium) Tinne Gilis (Malaysia) Rachel Arnold (Malaysia) Sivasangari Subramaniam (Scotland) Georgia Adderley
Richardson Wealth Women's PSA Open (Canada) Vancouver, Canada; Women: World Events – Copper; 24 players – $28,750	5–9 March	(France) Mélissa Alves; 7–11, 11–7, 11–6, 11–5 (11th PSA title)	(Egypt) Sana Ibrahim	(England) Grace Gear (Egypt) Haya Ali	(England) Torrie Malik (Canada) Hollie Naughton (Egypt) Menna Hamed (Egypt) Habiba Hani
Easy Times Brewing Australian Open (Australia) Brisbane, Australia; Men: World Events – Gold; 24 players – $120,000 −−−−−− Women : World Events – Gold; 24 players – $120,000	12–16 March	(Egypt) Karim Gawad; 9–11, 11–6, 13–11, 11–9 (30th PSA title)	(New Zealand) Paul Coll	(France) Auguste Dussourd (England) Marwan El Shorbagy	(Spain) Bernat Jaume (Egypt) Mohamad Zakaria (Scotland) Greg Lobban (Egypt) Yahya Elnawasany
Easy Times Brewing Australian Open (Australia) Brisbane, Australia; Men: World Events – Gold; 24 players – $120,000 −−−−−− Women : World Events – Gold; 24 players – $120,000	12–16 March	(United States) Olivia Weaver; 4–11, 11–9, 11–1, 11–9 (10th PSA title)	(Egypt) Amina Orfi	(Egypt) Rowan Elaraby (Belgium) Tinne Gilis	(Malaysia) Sivasangari Subramaniam (Japan) Satomi Watanabe (Egypt) Salma Hany (Malaysia) Aifa Azman
Calgary CFO PSA Women's Squash Week (Canada) Calgary, Canada; Women: World Events – Copper; 24 players – $28,750	12–16 March	(England) Jasmine Hutton; 11–5, 11–4, 11–1 (9th PSA title)	(Ukraine) Alina Bushma	(England) Grace Gear (Egypt) Habiba Hani	(England) Millie Tomlinson (Egypt) Menna Walid (England) Saran Nghiem (England) Torrie Malik
East Side Self Storage Manitoba Open (Canada) Winnipeg, Canada; Men: Challenger 15; 24 players – $15,000	12–16 March	(England) Curtis Malik; 12–10, 9–11, 11–4, 11–5 (10th PSA title)	(Scotland) Rory Stewart	(England) Charlie Lee (Switzerland) David Bernet	(Argentina) Jeremías Azaña (England) Sam Osborne-Wylde (Wales) Owain Taylor (Colombia) Matías Knudsen
SRFI Indian Tour – Chennai (India) Chennai, India; Men: Challenger 15; 24 players – $15,000 −−−−−− Women: Challenger 15; 24 players – $15,000	17–21 March	(India) Veer Chotrani; 3–11, 12–10, 11–6, 11–7 (6th PSA title)	(France) Melvil Scianimanico	(Sri Lanka) Ravindu Laksiri (Brazil) Diego Gobbi	(Egypt) Karim El Hammamy (Egypt) Abdalla Hafez (France) Brice Nicolas (Japan) Tomotaka Endo
SRFI Indian Tour – Chennai (India) Chennai, India; Men: Challenger 15; 24 players – $15,000 −−−−−− Women: Challenger 15; 24 players – $15,000	17–21 March	(India) Anahat Singh; 11–6, 8–11, 11–8, 11–5 (11th PSA title)	(India) Akanksha Salunkhe	(India) Joshna Chinappa (South Africa) Hayley Ward	(Egypt) Nadien Elhammamy (Egypt) Malak Fathy (Spain) Cristina Gómez (Spain) Sofía Mateos
HK Squash PSA Challenge Cup; Hong Kong, China; Men: Challenger 3; 24 players - $3,000 −−−−−− Women: Challenger 3; 24 players - $3,000	17–21 March	(Hong Kong) Ho Ka Hei; 8–11, 6–11, 11–9, 11–2, 11–5 (1st PSA title)	(Hong Kong) Lam Shing Fung	(Japan) Naoki Hayashi (Sri Lanka) Shamil Wakeel	(Japan) Shota Yasunari (Egypt) Mahmoud Ahmed (Hong Kong) Harley Lam (Philippines) Reymark Begornia
HK Squash PSA Challenge Cup; Hong Kong, China; Men: Challenger 3; 24 players - $3,000 −−−−−− Women: Challenger 3; 24 players - $3,000	17–21 March	(Hong Kong) Kirstie Wong; 11–8, 11–5, 11–1 (1st PSA title)	(Malaysia) Doyce Lee	(India) Anjali Semwal (Hong Kong) Helen Tang	(Philippines) Jemyca Aribado (Malaysia) Whitney Wilson (Hong Kong) Bobo Lam (Iran) Fereshteh Eghtedari
German Open (Germany) Hamburg, Germany; Men: World Events – Bronze; 24 players – $60,500 −−−−−− Women: World Events – Bronze; 24 players – $60,500	19–23 March	(France) Victor Crouin; 11–4, 11–3, 11–1 (20th PSA title)	(Egypt) Fares Dessouky	(Switzerland) Dimitri Steinmann (Switzerland) Nicolas Müller	(Egypt) Aly Abou Eleinen (Mexico) Leonel Cárdenas (Egypt) Mohamed Abouelghar (Switzerland) Yannick Wilhelmi
German Open (Germany) Hamburg, Germany; Men: World Events – Bronze; 24 players – $60,500 −−−−−− Women: World Events – Bronze; 24 players – $60,500	19–23 March	(United States) Amanda Sobhy; 11–8, 11–9, 11–9 (21st PSA title)	(England) Georgina Kennedy	(France) Mélissa Alves (Egypt) Nada Abbas	(England) Lucy Turmel (Egypt) Amina El Rihany (England) Katie Malliff (Wales) Tesni Murphy
The St. James Open (United States) Springfield, United States; Men: Challenger 6; 24 players - $6,000 −−−−−− Women: Challenger 6; 24 players - $6,000	19–23 March	(Egypt) Mohamed Sharaf; 7–11, 12–10, 11–9, 8–11, 16–14 (4th PSA title)	(Pakistan) Nasir Iqbal	(Pakistan) Huzaifa Ibrahim (Nigeria) Onaopemipo Adegoke	(Malaysia) Joachim Chuah (Ecuador) Javier Romo (Austria) Aqeel Rehman (United States) Christopher Gordon
The St. James Open (United States) Springfield, United States; Men: Challenger 6; 24 players - $6,000 −−−−−− Women: Challenger 6; 24 players - $6,000	19–23 March	(Ukraine) Alina Bushma; 13–11, 7–11, 11–8, 6–11, 11–9 (2nd PSA title)	(Egypt) Jana Safy	(Egypt) Malak Taha (Spain) Noa Romero	(Mexico) Diana García (Colombia) Laura Tovar (France) Kara Lincou (Egypt) Ruqayya Salem
JSW Indian Open (India) Mumbai, India; Men: World Events – Copper; 24 players – $38,500	24–28 March	(Egypt) Kareem El Torkey; 12–10, 11–4, 7–11, 12–10 (6th PSA title)	(India) Abhay Singh	(Egypt) Karim El Hammamy (Egypt) Omar Mosaad	(Egypt) Moustafa El Sirty (Malaysia) Ameeshenraj Chandaran (United States) Spencer Lovejoy (India) Veer Chotrani
Women: Challenger 15; 24 players – $15,000	24–28 March	(India) Anahat Singh; 11–9, 11–5, 11–8 (12th PSA title)	(Hong Kong) Helen Tang	(India) Joshna Chinappa (Egypt) Barb Sameh	(India) Akanksha Salunkhe (Egypt) Nadien Elhammamy (Egypt) Habiba Hani (Hong Kong) Heylie Fung
Spanish Open (Spain) Tres Cantos, Spain; Women: World Events – Copper; 24 players – $35,000	25–29 March	(Egypt) Zeina Mickawy; 8–11, 11–7, 13–11, 11–7 (3rd PSA title)	(Egypt) Hana Moataz	(England) Lucy Turmel (Spain) Marta Domínguez	(Egypt) Nadine Shahin (Wales) Emily Whitlock (Egypt) Haya Ali (Egypt) Nardine Garas
Liverpool Cricket Club Open (England) Liverpool, England; Men: Challenger 15; 24 players - $15,000 −−−−−− Women: Challenger 12; 24 players - $12,000	25–29 March	(Pakistan) Noor Zaman; 11–9, 12–10, 11–8 (3rd PSA title)	(Scotland) Rory Stewart	(France) Toufik Mekhalfi (Wales) Emyr Evans	(England) Patrick Rooney (England) Ben Smith (France) Edwin Clain (Wales) Rhys Evans
Liverpool Cricket Club Open (England) Liverpool, England; Men: Challenger 15; 24 players - $15,000 −−−−−− Women: Challenger 12; 24 players - $12,000	25–29 March	(France) Camille Serme; 11–7, 11–7, 11–8 (17th PSA title)	(Egypt) Amina El Rihany	(Egypt) Hana Ismail (New Zealand) Kaitlyn Watts	(England) Kiera Marshall (England) Asia Harris (Scotland) Alison Thomson (Barbados) Margot Prow
OptAsia Championships (England) Wimbledon, England; Men: World Events – Gold; 24 players – $118,000 −−−−−− Women: World Events – Gold; 24 players – $118,000	25–30 March	(Egypt) Mostafa Asal; 11–4, 11–4, 11–8 (19th PSA title)	(New Zealand) Paul Coll	(England) Mohamed El Shorbagy (Wales) Joel Makin	(England) Marwan El Shorbagy (Egypt) Youssef Ibrahim (France) Grégoire Marche (Egypt) Karim Gawad
OptAsia Championships (England) Wimbledon, England; Men: World Events – Gold; 24 players – $118,000 −−−−−− Women: World Events – Gold; 24 players – $118,000	25–30 March	(Egypt) Hania El Hammamy; 11–9, 11–2, 11–3 (15th PSA title)	(England) Georgina Kennedy	(Japan) Satomi Watanabe (Egypt) Nada Abbas	(United States) Amanda Sobhy (France) Mélissa Alves (Egypt) Sana Ibrahim (England) Jasmine Hutton
Lethbridge ProAm (Canada) Lethbridge, Canada; Men: Challenger 6; 24 players – $6,000	26–30 March	(England) Sam Todd; 11–8, 9–11, 11–2, 11–6 (8th PSA title)	(Hong Kong) Andes Ling	(Egypt) Omar Said (Hong Kong) To Wai Lok	(Nigeria) Gabriel Olufunmilayo (Canada) Connor Turk (Hong Kong) Leo Chung (Austria) Aqeel Rehman

=== April ===
Tournament	Date	Champion	Runner-Up	Semifinalists	Quarterfinalists
Manchester Open (England) Manchester, England; Men: World Events – Bronze; 24 players – $66,500 −−−−−− Women : World Events – Bronze; 24 players – $66,500	2–6 April	(Mexico) Leonel Cárdenas; 11–2, 5–11, 11–9, 3–11, 11–8 (17th PSA title)	(Egypt) Aly Abou Eleinen	(England) Jonah Bryant (England) Declan James	(England) Nick Wall (England) George Parker (Colombia) Juan Camilo Vargas (India) Abhay Singh
Manchester Open (England) Manchester, England; Men: World Events – Bronze; 24 players – $66,500 −−−−−− Women : World Events – Bronze; 24 players – $66,500	2–6 April	(Egypt) Salma Hany; 11–2, 9–11, 11–3, 5–11, 11–9 (5th PSA title)	(England) Georgina Kennedy	(England) Katie Malliff (England) Jasmine Hutton	(Egypt) Farida Mohamed (Belgium) Nele Coll (England) Sarah-Jane Perry (England) Grace Gear
Edinburgh Open (Scotland) Edinburgh, Scotland; Men: Challenger 15; 24 players - $15,000 −−−−−− Women: Challenger 6; 24 players - $6,000	2–6 April	(Scotland) Rory Stewart; 9–11, 11–3, 11–6, 8–11, 12–10 (10th PSA title)	(Pakistan) Ashab Irfan	(England) Sam Osborne-Wylde (Egypt) Moustafa El Sirty	(England) Perry Malik (Germany) Yannik Omlor (Wales) Owain Taylor (Egypt) Mazen Gamal
Edinburgh Open (Scotland) Edinburgh, Scotland; Men: Challenger 15; 24 players - $15,000 −−−−−− Women: Challenger 6; 24 players - $6,000	2–6 April	(France) Lauren Baltayan; 11–2, 12–10, 11–8 (3rd PSA title)	(Republic of Ireland) Hannah Craig	(Scotland) Alison Thomson (Colombia) Laura Tovar	(Hong Kong) Kirstie Wong (Mexico) Sarahí López (Switzerland) Ambre Allinckx (Spain) Ona Blasco
Hazlow Electronics Rochester Pro-Am (United States) Rochester, United States; Men: Challenger 9; 24 players – $9,000	2–6 April	(Egypt) Omar Said; 11–8, 4–11, 11-7, 3–11, 11–6 (1st PSA title)	(England) Sam Todd	(Pakistan) Nasir Iqbal (Mexico) Sebastián Salazar	(Egypt) Khaled Labib (Egypt) Mohamed Sharaf (United States) Salim Khan (Nigeria) Gabriel Olufunmilayo
Rotterdam Open (Netherlands) Rotterdam, Netherlands; Men: Challenger 6; 24 players - $6,000 −−−−−− Women: Challenger 3; 24 players - $3,000	2–6 April	(Spain) Iván Pérez; 11–9, 13–11, 12–14, 11–2 (6th PSA title)	(New Zealand) Elijah Thomas	(Egypt) Yassin ElShafei (Egypt) Seif Tamer	(Czech Republic) Viktor Byrtus (Egypt) Hazem Hossam (England) Jared Carter (Belgium) Joeri Hapers
Rotterdam Open (Netherlands) Rotterdam, Netherlands; Men: Challenger 6; 24 players - $6,000 −−−−−− Women: Challenger 3; 24 players - $3,000	2–6 April	(Italy) Cristina Tartarone; 7–11, 11–5, 11–8, 11–4 (3rd PSA title)	(Netherlands) Tessa ter Sluis	(Colombia) Catalina Peláez (Ecuador) Rafaela Albuja	(Poland) Sofi Zrazhevska (Germany) Maya Weishar (Portugal) Sofia Aveiro (Netherlands) Juliette Permentier
Timber Benefits ESC Open (Canada) Edmonton, Canada; Men: Challenger 3; 16 players – $3,000	2–6 April	(Hong Kong) Ho Ka Hei; 5–11, 11–9, 7–11, 11–8, 11–9 (2nd PSA title)	(England) Yusuf Sheikh	(Canada) Mohammadreza Jafarzadeh (Canada) Connor Turk	(Canada) Maximilien Godbout (Canada) Blake Reinson (Mexico) Guillermo Cortés (Hong Kong) Akifumi Murakami
Life Time Dallas Open (United States) Plano, United States; Men: Challenger 6; 24 players – $6,000	3–6 April	(Egypt) Salman Khalil; 11–3, 11–0, 11–1 (1st PSA title)	(Guatemala) Luis Quisquinay	(United States) Nicholas Spizzirri (Hong Kong) Harley Lam	(Mexico) Bryan Cueto (Colombia) Mateo Restrepo (Pakistan) Huzaifa Ibrahim (France) Laouenan Loaëc
World Championship Qualifiers – Africa (South Africa) Mossel Bay, South Africa; Men: WC Qualifier; 16 players – $5,050 −−−−−− Women: WC Qualifier; 16 players – $5,050	7–10 April	(South Africa) Dewald van Niekerk; 5–11, 6–11, 11–3, 12–10, 11–2 (Qualified for PSA World Championship & 8th PSA title)	(Egypt) Aly Hussein	(Egypt) Ziad Ibrahim (Egypt) Yassin Shohdy	(Egypt) Mohamed Nasser (Egypt) Adam Hawal (Zimbabwe) Ryan Gwidzima (Egypt) Shady El Sherbiny
World Championship Qualifiers – Africa (South Africa) Mossel Bay, South Africa; Men: WC Qualifier; 16 players – $5,050 −−−−−− Women: WC Qualifier; 16 players – $5,050	7–10 April	(Egypt) Nadien Elhammamy; 11–4, 11–6, 11–1 (Qualified for PSA World Championship & 2nd PSA title)	(Egypt) Nour Khafagy	(Egypt) Amina El Rihany (Egypt) Menna Walid	(South Africa) Teagan Russell (Egypt) Lojayn Gohary (Egypt) Salma El-Alfy (South Africa) Hayley Ward
World Championship Qualifiers – Pan America (United States) St. Louis, United States; Men: WC Qualifier; 16 players – $5,050 −−−−−− Women: WC Qualifier; 16 players – $5,050	8–11 April	(Colombia) Matías Knudsen; 11–3, 11–6, 11–4 (Qualified for PSA World Championship & 5th PSA title)	(Guatemala) Alejandro Enríquez	(United States) Spencer Lovejoy (Argentina) Jeremías Azaña	(Canada) Salah Eltorgman (United States) Dillon Huang (Mexico) César Salazar (Colombia) Ronald Palomino
World Championship Qualifiers – Pan America (United States) St. Louis, United States; Men: WC Qualifier; 16 players – $5,050 −−−−−− Women: WC Qualifier; 16 players – $5,050	8–11 April	(United States) Lucie Stefanoni; 11–7, 9–11, 12–10, 3–11, 12–10 (Qualified for PSA World Championship & 1st PSA title)	(Barbados) Margot Prow	(Colombia) Lucía Bautista (United States) Caroline Fouts	(United States) Laila Sedky (Guatemala) Tabita Gaitán (Colombia) Laura Tovar (Colombia) Catalina Peláez
Dynam Cup Yokohama Open (Japan) Yokohama, Japan; Men: Challenger 15; 24 players – $15,000 −−−−−− Women: Challenger 6; 24 players – $6,000	9–13 April	(Japan) Ryūnosuke Tsukue; 11–7, 8–11, 12–10, 11–6 (11th PSA title)	(Hong Kong) Henry Leung	(Hong Kong) Alex Lau (Hong Kong) Matthew Lai	(Hong Kong) Leo Chung (Malaysia) Syafiq Kamal (Malaysia) Darren Pragasam (Japan) Tomotaka Endo
Dynam Cup Yokohama Open (Japan) Yokohama, Japan; Men: Challenger 15; 24 players – $15,000 −−−−−− Women: Challenger 6; 24 players – $6,000	9–13 April	(Malaysia) Yasshmita Jadishkumar; 11–2, 11–6, 11–8 (3rd PSA title)	(Iran) Fereshteh Eghtedari	(Hong Kong) Wai Sze Wing (South Korea) Eum Hwa-yeong	(South Korea) Heo Min-gyeong (Japan) Risa Sugimoto (South Korea) Lee Ji-hyun (Hong Kong) Bobo Lam
PSA Club Euro Sport (Spain) La Pineda, Spain; Men: Challenger 6; 24 players – $6,000	9–13 April	(Spain) Edmon López; 11–8, 16–14, 9–11, 11–3 (13th PSA title)	(Spain) Iván Pérez	(England) Noah Meredith (Egypt) Hazem Hossam	(England) James Peach (Scotland) Alasdair Prott (France) Joshua Phinéra (England) Jared Carter
World Championship Qualifiers – Oceania (Australia) Kooyong, Australia; Men: WC Qualifier; 16 players – $5,050 −−−−−− Women: WC Qualifier; 16 players – $5,050	10–13 April	(Australia) Rhys Dowling; 7–11, 11–5, 11–6, 6–2^{rtd.} (Qualified for PSA World Championship & 7th PSA title)	(Australia) Dylan Molinaro	(New Zealand) Oliver Dunbar (Australia) Tate Norris	(Australia) Joseph White (New Zealand) Anthony Lepper (Australia) Connor Hayes (Australia) Benjamin Ratcliffe
World Championship Qualifiers – Oceania (Australia) Kooyong, Australia; Men: WC Qualifier; 16 players – $5,050 −−−−−− Women: WC Qualifier; 16 players – $5,050	10–13 April	(Australia) Jessica van der Walt; 9–11, 11–2, 9–11, 11–9, 11–6 (Qualified for PSA World Championship & 8th PSA title)	(Australia) Alex Haydon	(Australia) Madison Lyon (Australia) Sarah Cardwell	(New Zealand) Ella Lash (Australia) Sophie Fadaely (Australia) Rachael Grinham (Australia) Pascale Louka
World Championship Qualifiers – Europe (Spain) Santiago de Compostela, Spain; Men: WC Qualifier; 16 players – $5,050 −−−−−− Women: WC Qualifier; 16 players – $5,050	12–15 April	(France) Melvil Scianimanico; 11–4, 1–11, 9–11, 11–9, 11–9 (Qualified for PSA World Championship & 2nd PSA title)	(France) Toufik Mekhalfi	(England) Finnlay Withington (Czech Republic) Viktor Byrtus	(England) Sam Osborne-Wylde (England) Perry Malik (France) Brice Nicolas (Israel) Daniel Poleshchuk
World Championship Qualifiers – Europe (Spain) Santiago de Compostela, Spain; Men: WC Qualifier; 16 players – $5,050 −−−−−− Women: WC Qualifier; 16 players – $5,050	12–15 April	(England) Kiera Marshall; 11–5, 4–11, 11–7, 11–5 (Qualified for PSA World Championship & 1st PSA title)	(Scotland) Alison Thomson	(England) Millie Tomlinson (Germany) Saskia Beinhard	(Norway) Madeleine Hylland (Republic of Ireland) Hannah Craig (Spain) Cristina Gómez (Wales) Lowri Roberts
RC Pro Series (United States) St. Louis, United States; Men: Challenger 15; 24 players – $15,000 −−−−−− Women: Challenger 15; 24 players – $15,000	13–17 April	(Pakistan) Ashab Irfan; 11–7, 11–2, 11–6 (4th PSA title)	(England) Charlie Lee	(United States) Spencer Lovejoy (Colombia) Ronald Palomino	(Colombia) Matías Knudsen (Mexico) César Salazar (England) Sam Todd (Guatemala) Josué Enríquez
RC Pro Series (United States) St. Louis, United States; Men: Challenger 15; 24 players – $15,000 −−−−−− Women: Challenger 15; 24 players – $15,000	13–17 April	(Malaysia) Yee Xin Ying; 11–7, 11–5, 11–5 (6th PSA title)	(England) Lucy Beecroft	(England) Saran Nghiem (Barbados) Margot Prow	(Canada) Nicole Bunyan (Mexico) Diana García (Egypt) Nadine Shahin (Ukraine) Alina Bushma
El Gouna International (Egypt) El Gouna, Egypt; Men: World Events – Platinum; 32 players – $217,500 −−−−−− Women: World Events – Platinum; 32 players – $217,500	12–18 April	(Egypt) Mostafa Asal; 6–11, 7–11, 11–9, 11–9, 11–5 (20th PSA title)	(Egypt) Ali Farag	(Wales) Joel Makin (New Zealand) Paul Coll	(Egypt) Mohamad Zakaria (England) Mohamed El Shorbagy (Egypt) Youssef Soliman (Egypt) Youssef Ibrahim
El Gouna International (Egypt) El Gouna, Egypt; Men: World Events – Platinum; 32 players – $217,500 −−−−−− Women: World Events – Platinum; 32 players – $217,500	12–18 April	(Egypt) Nouran Gohar; 9–11, 11–7, 11–6, 11–7 (32nd PSA title)	(Egypt) Amina Orfi	(Egypt) Hania El Hammamy (United States) Olivia Weaver	(Egypt) Nour El Sherbini (Egypt) Salma Hany (England) Georgina Kennedy (Belgium) Tinne Gilis
World Championship Qualifiers – Asia (Malaysia) Kuala Lumpur, Malaysia; Men: WC Qualifier; 16 players – $5,050 −−−−−− Women: WC Qualifier; 16 players – $5,050	17–20 April	(India) Veer Chotrani; 11–3, 11–4, 11–8 (Qualified for PSA World Championship & 7th PSA title)	(Malaysia) Ameeshenraj Chandaran	(Pakistan) Asim Khan (Hong Kong) Wong Chi Him	(Malaysia) Bryan Lim (Sri Lanka) Ravindu Laksiri (Malaysia) Syafiq Kamal (Malaysia) Darren Pragasam
World Championship Qualifiers – Asia (Malaysia) Kuala Lumpur, Malaysia; Men: WC Qualifier; 16 players – $5,050 −−−−−− Women: WC Qualifier; 16 players – $5,050	17–20 April	(India) Anahat Singh; 11–4, 9–11, 11–2, 11–8 (Qualified for PSA World Championship & 13th PSA title)	(Hong Kong) Toby Tse	(India) Akanksha Salunkhe (Hong Kong) Helen Tang	(India) Tanvi Khanna (Malaysia) Yasshmita Jadishkumar (Japan) Akari Midorikawa (Singapore) Wai Yhann Au Yeong
Squash On Fire Challenge (United States) Washington, D.C., United States; Men: Challenger 3; 24 players - $3,000 ------ Women: Challenger 3; 16 players - $3,000	18–20 April	(Egypt) Mohamed Sharaf; 11–4, 11–6, 11–7 (5th PSA title)	(Egypt) Khaled Labib	(Mexico) César Segundo (Malaysia) Nathan Kueh	(Egypt) Ali El Toukhy (Egypt) Omar Elkattan (Egypt) Aly Tolba (United States) Mohamed Nabil
Squash On Fire Challenge (United States) Washington, D.C., United States; Men: Challenger 3; 24 players - $3,000 ------ Women: Challenger 3; 16 players - $3,000	18–20 April	(Poland) Karina Tyma; 11–5, 13–11, 5–11, 7–11, 11–9 (3rd PSA title)	(Egypt) Malak Moustafa	(Croatia) Franka Vidović (Australia) Madison Lyon	(Portugal) Sofia Aveiro (Egypt) Menna Walid (Singapore) Cassandra Ong (Egypt) Malak Taha
Grasshopper Cup (Switzerland) Zürich, Switzerland; Men: World Events – Gold; 24 players – $123,000 −−−−−− Women: World Events – Gold; 24 players – $123,000	22–27 April	(Egypt) Ali Farag; 13–11, 12–14, 11–4, 11–5 (46th PSA title)	(Peru) Diego Elías	(Wales) Joel Makin (Egypt) Aly Abou Eleinen	(Scotland) Greg Lobban (France) Victor Crouin (France) Baptiste Masotti (Switzerland) Dimitri Steinmann
Grasshopper Cup (Switzerland) Zürich, Switzerland; Men: World Events – Gold; 24 players – $123,000 −−−−−− Women: World Events – Gold; 24 players – $123,000	22–27 April	(Egypt) Nouran Gohar; 11–7, 12–10, 11–9 (33rd PSA title)	(Malaysia) Sivasangari Subramaniam	(Belgium) Tinne Gilis (England) Georgina Kennedy	(England) Jasmine Hutton (Egypt) Salma Hany (Japan) Satomi Watanabe (Egypt) Nada Abbas
Squash on Fire Open (United States) Washington, D.C., United States; Men: World Events – Bronze; 24 players – $58,750 −−−−−− Women: World Events – Bronze; 24 players – $58,750	23–27 April	(England) Marwan El Shorbagy; 11–9, 11–9, 11–5 (16th PSA title)	(Malaysia) Eain Yow	(France) Grégoire Marche (Egypt) Kareem El Torkey	(India) Velavan Senthilkumar (Egypt) Karim El Hammamy (England) Nick Wall (Egypt) Omar Mosaad
Squash on Fire Open (United States) Washington, D.C., United States; Men: World Events – Bronze; 24 players – $58,750 −−−−−− Women: World Events – Bronze; 24 players – $58,750	23–27 April	(United States) Amanda Sobhy; 11–4, 11–3, 9–11, 11–9 (22nd PSA title)	(Malaysia) Rachel Arnold	(Egypt) Rowan Elaraby (Egypt) Kenzy Ayman	(Belgium) Nele Gilis-Coll (England) Lucy Beecroft (Egypt) Nadine Shahin (Egypt) Salma El Tayeb
IQUW Bermuda Open; Devonshire, Bermuda; Men: World Events – Copper; 24 players – $28,750 −−−−−− Women: World Events – Copper; 24 players – $28,750	29 Apr.–3 May	(Egypt) Mohamad Zakaria; 8–11, 11–7, 6–11, 15–13, 11–4 (6th PSA title)	(Colombia) Miguel Á Rodríguez	(India) Veer Chotrani (Egypt) Karim El Hammamy	(United States) Timothy Brownell (England) Simon Herbert (Egypt) Moustafa El Sirty (England) Nick Wall
IQUW Bermuda Open; Devonshire, Bermuda; Men: World Events – Copper; 24 players – $28,750 −−−−−− Women: World Events – Copper; 24 players – $28,750	29 Apr.–3 May	(Malaysia) Aira Azman; 12–10, 11–3, 11–6 (4th PSA title)	(Egypt) Hana Moataz	(Egypt) Amina El Rihany (Malaysia) Aifa Azman	(Egypt) Salma El Tayeb (Egypt) Nour Heikal< (Egypt) Haya Ali (Australia) Alex Haydon
Richmond Open (United States) Richmond, United States; Women: World Events – Copper; 24 players – $28,750	29 Apr.–3 May	(United States) Marina Stefanoni; 10–12, 11–8, 11–9, 11–3 (10th PSA title)	(England) Lucy Turmel	(Hong Kong) Tomato Ho (England) Saran Nghiem	(Egypt) Menna Hamed (France) Marie Stephan (Egypt) Nadine Shahin (England) Lucy Beecroft
Women's Mozart Open (Austria) Salzburg, Austria; Women: Challenger 6; 24 players – $6,000	29 Apr.–3 May	(Hong Kong) Toby Tse; 11–9, 11–5, 4–11, 9–11, 11–5 (4th PSA title)	(New Zealand) Kaitlyn Watts	(Mexico) Sarahí López (Egypt) Hana Ismail	(Australia) Sophie Fadaely (England) Isabel McCullough (France) Léa Barbeau (Japan) Akari Midorikawa
Palace Kiva Open (United States) Santa Fe, United States; Men: Challenger 6; 24 players – $6,000	29 Apr.–3 May	(Egypt) Omar Said; 11–5, 11–8, 6–11, 11–7 (2nd PSA title)	(Mexico) Alfredo Ávila	(Colombia) Juan José Torres (Malaysia) Nathan Kueh	(Hong Kong) Ho Ka Hei (Hong Kong) Andes Ling (Hong Kong) Harley Lam (Egypt) Salman Khalil
Hyder Trophy (United States) New York City, United States; Men: Challenger 12; 24 players – $12,000 −−−−−− Women: Challenger 12; 24 players – $12,000	30 Apr.–4 May	(India) Abhay Singh; 11–8, 10–12, 11–9, 11–7 (11th PSA title)	(England) Sam Todd	(Malaysia) Joachim Chuah (Pakistan) Noor Zaman	(Egypt) Khaled Labib (Mexico) César Salazar (New Zealand) Lwamba Chileshe (Egypt) Ziad Ibrahim
Hyder Trophy (United States) New York City, United States; Men: Challenger 12; 24 players – $12,000 −−−−−− Women: Challenger 12; 24 players – $12,000	30 Apr.–4 May	(Hong Kong) Chan Sin Yuk; 8–11, 7–11, 11–7, 11–4, 11–3 (9th PSA title)	(England) Alicia Mead	(Egypt) Malak Taha (Malaysia) Yee Xin Ying	(Hong Kong) Heylie Fung (United States) Isabella Tang (England) Kiera Marshall (Malaysia) Wen Li Lai

=== May ===
Tournament	Date	Champion	Runner-Up	Semifinalists	Quarterfinalists
ECP Open (Brazil) São Paulo, Brazil; Men: Challenger 9; 24 players – $9,000 −−−−−− Women: Challenger 6; 24 players – $6,000	6–10 May	(Paraguay) Francesco Marcantonio; 13–11, 9–11, 11–7, 11–7 (2nd PSA title)	(Wales) Rhys Evans	(Colombia) Juan Irisarri (Brazil) Diego Gobbi	(Colombia) Juan José Torres (Colombia) Edgar Ramírez (Ecuador) Álvaro Buenaño (Germany) Jan Wipperfürth
ECP Open (Brazil) São Paulo, Brazil; Men: Challenger 9; 24 players – $9,000 −−−−−− Women: Challenger 6; 24 players – $6,000	6–10 May	(France) Lauren Baltayan; 10–12, 11–9, 11–2, 11–8 (4th PSA title)	(Colombia) Laura Tovar	(Brazil) Laura Silva (Paraguay) Fiorella Gatti	(Ecuador) Caridad Buenaño (Colombia) Luciana Martínez (Colombia) María Tovar (Belgium) Chloé Crabbé
Men's Mozart Open (Austria) Salzburg, Austria; Men: Challenger 6; 24 players – $6,000	6–10 May	(France) Macéo Lévy; 11–9, 11–7, 6–11, 12–10 (1st PSA title)	(Czech Republic) Jakub Solnický	(Austria) Aqeel Rehman (Egypt) Mazen Gamal	(Switzerland) Robin Gadola (England) James Peach (Czech Republic) Martin Štepán (England) Heston Malik
Guilfoyle PSA Squash Classic (Canada) Toronto, Canada; Men: Challenger 9; 24 players – $9,000 −−−−−− Women: Challenger 6; 24 players – $6,000	7–11 May	(Egypt) Salman Khalil; 12–10, 11–2, 11–3 (2nd PSA title)	(Egypt) Abdelrahman Nassar	(Australia) Joseph White (Netherlands) Rowan Damming	(United States) Salim Khan (Egypt) Omar Said (Hong Kong) Andes Ling (New Zealand) Lwamba Chileshe
Guilfoyle PSA Squash Classic (Canada) Toronto, Canada; Men: Challenger 9; 24 players – $9,000 −−−−−− Women: Challenger 6; 24 players – $6,000	7–11 May	(Hong Kong) Toby Tse; 16–18, 11–6, 9–11, 11–8, 13–11 (5th PSA title)	(Poland) Karina Tyma	(Canada) Nikki Todd (Ecuador) María Paula Moya	(Canada) Niki Shemirani (Canada) Maria Min (Hong Kong) Kirstie Wong (Chile) Giselle Delgado
NT Open (Australia) Marrara, Australia; Men: Challenger 3; 24 players – $3,000 −−−−−− Women: Challenger 3; 16 players – $3,000	7–11 May	(Egypt) Shady El Sherbiny; 9–11, 11–9, 11–2, 16–14 (1st PSA title)	(Japan) Naoki Hayashi	(Australia) Brendan MacDonald (South Korea) Ryu Jeong-uk	(Australia) Benjamin Ratcliffe (Australia) Tate Norris (Samoa) Mason Smales (Sri Lanka) Shamil Wakeel
NT Open (Australia) Marrara, Australia; Men: Challenger 3; 24 players – $3,000 −−−−−− Women: Challenger 3; 16 players – $3,000	7–11 May	(Malta) Colette Sultana; 6–11, 11–9, 11–5, 8–11, 15–13 (1st PSA title)	(South Korea) Song Chae-won	(Australia) Rachael Grinham (South Korea) Jang Ye-won	(Australia) Remashree Muniandy (Sri Lanka) Dewmini Gallage (South Korea) Song Dong-ju (Australia) Tansyn Noble
PSA World Championships (United States) Chicago, United States; Men: World Championship; 64 players - $656,500 – Draw −−−−−− Women: World Championship; 64 players - $656,500 – Draw	9–17 May	(Egypt) Mostafa Asal; 11–7, 11–8, 11–3 (21st PSA title) (1st World Championship title)	(Egypt) Ali Farag	(Peru) Diego Elías (New Zealand) Paul Coll	(Egypt) Tarek Momen (Egypt) Karim Gawad (Egypt) Youssef Soliman (England) Mohamed El Shorbagy
PSA World Championships (United States) Chicago, United States; Men: World Championship; 64 players - $656,500 – Draw −−−−−− Women: World Championship; 64 players - $656,500 – Draw	9–17 May	(Egypt) Nour El Sherbini; 11–5, 11–9, 4–11, 11–7 (44th PSA title) (8th World Championship title)	(Egypt) Hania El Hammamy	(United States) Olivia Weaver (Egypt) Nouran Gohar	(Malaysia) Sivasangari Subramaniam (England) Georgina Kennedy (Japan) Satomi Watanabe (Egypt) Nada Abbas
The Hague Open (Netherlands) The Hague, Netherlands; Men: Challenger 6; 24 players – $6,000 −−−−−− Women: Challenger 6; 24 players – $6,000	14–18 May	(Egypt) Yassin Shohdy; 11–4, 10–12, 11–8, 11–6 (5th PSA title)	(New Zealand) Elijah Thomas	(Egypt) Mazen Gamal (Germany) Valentin Rapp	(England) Will Salter (Finland) Henrik Mustonen (Egypt) Seif Tamer (France) Macéo Lévy
The Hague Open (Netherlands) The Hague, Netherlands; Men: Challenger 6; 24 players – $6,000 −−−−−− Women: Challenger 6; 24 players – $6,000	14–18 May	(Egypt) Jana Swaify; 11–6, 3–11, 11–4, 8–11, 11–7 (1st PSA title)	(France) Lauren Baltayan	(England) Asia Harris (Italy) Cristina Tartarone	(New Zealand) Kaitlyn Watts (Switzerland) Ambre Allinckx (Netherlands) Megan van Drongelen (Czech Republic) Karolína Šrámková
Cannon Kirk & GillenMarkets Irish Open (Republic of Ireland) Dublin, Republic of Ireland; Men: World Events – Copper; 24 players – $36,000 −−−−−− Women: World Events – Copper; 24 players – $36,000	20–24 May	(Scotland) Greg Lobban; 11–4, 11–9, 13–11 (15th PSA title)	(France) Melvil Scianimanico	(England) George Parker (Scotland) Rory Stewart	(England) Charlie Lee (Portugal) Rui Soares (England) Simon Herbert (England) Tom Walsh
Cannon Kirk & GillenMarkets Irish Open (Republic of Ireland) Dublin, Republic of Ireland; Men: World Events – Copper; 24 players – $36,000 −−−−−− Women: World Events – Copper; 24 players – $36,000	20–24 May	(Wales) Tesni Murphy; 11–3, 11–5, 7–11, 11–5 (3rd PSA title)	(Scotland) Georgia Adderley	(Norway) Madeleine Hylland (England) Millie Tomlinson	(India) Akanksha Salunkhe (England) Torrie Malik (Malaysia) Yee Xin Ying (Spain) Marta Domínguez
Swarmer South Australian Open (Australia) Adelaide, Australia; Men: Challenger 9; 24 players - $9,000 −−−−−− Women: Challenger 9; 24 players – $9,000	20–24 May	(Pakistan) Ashab Irfan; 11–8, 12–10, 11–9 (5th PSA title)	(Malaysia) Duncan Lee	(Hong Kong) Andes Ling (Pakistan) Hamza Khan	(Malaysia) Joachim Chuah (Hong Kong) Tang Ming Hong (Hong Kong) Lam Shing Fung (Japan) Tomotaka Endo
Swarmer South Australian Open (Australia) Adelaide, Australia; Men: Challenger 9; 24 players - $9,000 −−−−−− Women: Challenger 9; 24 players – $9,000	20–24 May	(Hong Kong) Toby Tse; 9–11, 11–6, 5–11, 11–8, 11–8 (6th PSA title)	(Japan) Risa Sugimoto	(Hong Kong) Wai Sze Wing (New Zealand) Ella Lash	(Japan) Akari Midorikawa (Hong Kong) Ka Huen Leung (Hong Kong) Bobo Lam (Australia) Remashree Muniandy
The Smyths Toys Hinckley Challenger (England) Hinckley, England; Men: Challenger 3; 24 players – $3,000 −−−−−− Women: Challenger 3; 24 players – $3,000	21–25 May	(Republic of Ireland) Denis Gilevskiy; 11–7, 11–6, 14–12 (1st PSA title)	(England) Noah Meredith	(France) Matteo Carrouget (Netherlands) Sam Gerrits	(England) James Averill (England) Heston Malik (England) Jared Carter (Poland) Jakub Pytlowany
The Smyths Toys Hinckley Challenger (England) Hinckley, England; Men: Challenger 3; 24 players – $3,000 −−−−−− Women: Challenger 3; 24 players – $3,000	21–25 May	(Italy) Cristina Tartarone; 11–5, 11–7, 11–8 (4th PSA title)	(Wales) Ellie Breach	(Scotland) Ellie Jones (England) Polly Clark	(England) Jasmine Thirst (Australia) Sophie Fadaely (Switzerland) Stella Kaufmann (Singapore) Wai Lynn Au Yeong
Auckland Open (New Zealand) Takapuna, New Zealand; Men: Challenger 3; 24 players – $3,000	23–25 May	(Malaysia) Harith Danial; 11–5, 2–11, 16–14, 10–12, 11–6 (1st PSA title)	(Malaysia) Low Wa Sern	(Australia) Benjamin Ratcliffe (South Korea) Na Joo-young	(South Korea) Ko Young-jo (New Zealand) Willz Donnelly (New Zealand) Freddie Jameson (South Korea) Yoo Jae-jin
Alizia Txoperena Basque Country Challenger (Spain) Irun, Spain; Women: Challenger 3; 16 players – $3,000	23–25 May	(Switzerland) Ambre Allinckx; 11–9, 9–11, 11–5, 11–2 (4th PSA title)	(Croatia) Franka Vidović	(Egypt) Nour Ramy (Argentina) Pilar Etchechoury	(Portugal) Catarina Nunes (Spain) Noa Romero (France) Rose Lucas-Marcuzzo (France) Ana Munos
Palm Hills Squash Open (Egypt) 6th of October, Egypt; Men: World Events – Gold; 24 players – $123,000 −−−−−− Women: World Events – Gold; 24 players – $123,000	22–27 May	(Egypt) Mostafa Asal; 10–12, 11–5, 11–9, 11–6 (22nd PSA title)	(Egypt) Karim Gawad	(Egypt) Tarek Momen (Egypt) Youssef Soliman	(Egypt) Mohamad Zakaria (Egypt) Mohamed Abouelghar (Switzerland) Dimitri Steinmann (Egypt) Karim El Hammamy
Palm Hills Squash Open (Egypt) 6th of October, Egypt; Men: World Events – Gold; 24 players – $123,000 −−−−−− Women: World Events – Gold; 24 players – $123,000	22–27 May	(Egypt) Nouran Gohar; 11–5, 11–5, 11–4 (34th PSA title)	(Japan) Satomi Watanabe	(Egypt) Amina Orfi (Egypt) Fayrouz Aboelkheir	(Belgium) Nele Coll (Egypt) Nada Abbas (Egypt) Farida Mohamed (Egypt) Salma Hany
QSF No.4 PSA Challenger (Qatar) Doha, Qatar; Men: Challenger 3; 16 players – $3,000	26–29 May	(Iran) Sepehr Etemadpoor; 11–9, 10–12, 11–6, 11–7 (22nd PSA title)	(Kuwait) Athbi Hamad	(Egypt) Seif Heikal (Egypt) Abdelrahman Abdelkhalek	(Iraq) Abdullah Hashim (Kuwait) Ammar Al-Tamimi (Bahrain) Yousif Thani (Qatar) Waleed Zaman
KPI Open (Netherlands) Utrecht, Netherlands; Women: Challenger 3; 16 players – $3,000	28–31 May	(Egypt) Farida Walid; 14–12, 11–4, 7–11, 11–4 (1st PSA title)	(Poland) Sofi Zrazhevska	(Netherlands) Tessa ter Sluis (Ecuador) Rafaela Albuja	(Switzerland) Céline Walser (Netherlands) Megan van Drongelen (Bulgaria) Siana Zhileva (France) Lilou Brévard-Belliot
Guatemala Open; Guatemala City, Guatemala; Men: Challenger 15; 24 players – $15,000	28 May – 1 Jun.	(Egypt) Salman Khalil; 7–11, 11–7, 11–5, 11–3 (3rd PSA title)	(Colombia) Matías Knudsen	(Mexico) Sebastián Salazar (Guatemala) Alejandro Enríquez	(Wales) Rhys Evans (Egypt) Omar Said (Guatemala) Luis Quisquinay (Japan) Josué Enríquez
Berkhamsted Linksap Open (England) Berkhamsted, England; Men: Challenger 3; 16 players – $3,000 −−−−−− Women: Challenger 3; 16 players – $3,000	29 May – 1 Jun.	(England) Jared Carter; 7–11, 11–7, 11–5, 11–3 (1st PSA title)	(England) Noah Meredith	(Republic of Ireland) Conor Moran (Scotland) John Meehan	(India) Ayaan Vaziralli (England) Heston Malik (Czech Republic) Martin Štěpán (Poland) Jakub Pytlowany
Berkhamsted Linksap Open (England) Berkhamsted, England; Men: Challenger 3; 16 players – $3,000 −−−−−− Women: Challenger 3; 16 players – $3,000	29 May – 1 Jun.	(England) Emily Coulcher-Porter; 11–8, 9–11, 4–11, 11–5, 11–9 (1st PSA title)	(England) Olivia Besant	(Wales) Ali Loke (Portugal) Sofia Aveiro	(Scotland) Ellie Jones (Croatia) Franka Vidović (Czech Republic) Tereza Široká (Wales) Chloe Foster
Northern Star Resources Golden Open (Australia) Kalgoorlie, Australia; Men: Challenger 6; 16 players – $6,000 −−−−−− Women: Challenger 6; 16 players – $6,000	30 May – 1 Jun.	(Pakistan) Hamza Khan; 11–6, 14–12, 11–8 (1st PSA title)	(Hong Kong) Ho Ka Hei	(Sri Lanka) Ravindu Laksiri (Hong Kong) Tang Ming Hong	(Egypt) Shady El Sherbiny (Australia) Oscar Curtis (South Korea) Ryu Jeong-min (Sri Lanka) Tuwin Nilakshana
Northern Star Resources Golden Open (Australia) Kalgoorlie, Australia; Men: Challenger 6; 16 players – $6,000 −−−−−− Women: Challenger 6; 16 players – $6,000	30 May – 1 Jun.	(Hong Kong) Kirstie Wong; 14–12, 11–1, 5–11, 7–11, 11–8 (2nd PSA title)	(Japan) Akari Midorikawa	(Hong Kong) Helen Tang (Japan) Risa Sugimoto	(India) Rathika Seelan (Hong Kong) Wai Sze Wing (Hong Kong) Bobo Lam (Japan) Erisa Sano
University Of Warwick Open (England) Coventry, England; Men: Challenger 3; 16 players – $3,000	30 May – 1 Jun.	(England) Will Salter; 10–12, 11–8, 11–4, 11–4 (2nd PSA title)	(England) Bailey Malik	(Wales) Elliott Morris Devred (England) Anthony Rogal	(Republic of Ireland) Oisin Logan (Belgium) Nathan Masset (England) Matt Gregory (Denmark) Theis Houlberg

=== June ===
Tournament	Date	Champion	Runner-Up	Semifinalists	Quarterfinalists
Aftab Jawaid Memorial Women's Open (United States) Houston, United States; Women: Challenger 9; 24 players – $9,000	3–7 June	(Egypt) Zeina Zein; 11–6, 7–11, 11–5, 11–7 (4th PSA title)	(Singapore) Wai Yhann Au Yeong	(United States) Isabella Tang (Mexico) Diana García	(Belgium) Chloé Crabbé (South Korea) Ryoo Bo-ram (Egypt) Malak Moustafa (Egypt) Zaina Zaidi
GillenMarkets British Open (England) Birmingham, England; Men: World Events – Diamond; 48 players – $348,500 −−−−−− Women: World Events – Diamond; 48 players – $348,500	27 May – 8 Jun.	(Peru) Diego Elías; 11–4, 11–9, 3–11, 11–4 (20th PSA title)	(Egypt) Mostafa Asal	(Wales) Joel Makin (New Zealand) Paul Coll	(France) Victor Crouin (Egypt) Youssef Ibrahim (England) Mohamed El Shorbagy (England) Marwan El Shorbagy
GillenMarkets British Open (England) Birmingham, England; Men: World Events – Diamond; 48 players – $348,500 −−−−−− Women: World Events – Diamond; 48 players – $348,500	27 May – 8 Jun.	(Egypt) Nouran Gohar; 9–11, 12–10, 7–11, 13–11, 11–4 (35th PSA title)	(Egypt) Nour El Sherbini	(United States) Olivia Weaver (Egypt) Amina Orfi	(Malaysia) Sivasangari Subramaniam (Belgium) Nele Coll (United States) Amanda Sobhy (Belgium) Tinne Gilis
26th Atlanta Open (United States) Atlanta, United States; Men: Challenger 9; 24 players – $9,000	4–8 June	(Egypt) Zahed Salem; 11–8, 4–11, 8–11, 12–10, 11–9 (8th PSA title)	(Egypt) Omar Said	(Spain) Iván Pérez (Egypt) Ziad Ibrahim	(Guatemala) Alejandro Enríquez (United States) Spencer Lovejoy (Germany) Yannik Omlor (Pakistan) Ashab Irfan
WA Open (Australia) Belmont, Australia; Men: Challenger 6; 24 players - $6,000 −−−−−− Women: Challenger 6; 24 players - $6,000	4–8 June	(Malaysia) Darren Pragasam; 13–11, 6–11, 11–5, 14–12 (4th PSA title)	(Egypt) Shady El Sherbiny	(Australia) Brendan MacDonald (Hong Kong) Ho Ka Hei	(Sri Lanka) Ravindu Laksiri (Hong Kong) Harley Lam (Hong Kong) Lap Man Au (Australia) Nicholas Calvert
WA Open (Australia) Belmont, Australia; Men: Challenger 6; 24 players - $6,000 −−−−−− Women: Challenger 6; 24 players - $6,000	4–8 June	(Hong Kong) Kirstie Wong; 11–4, 11–7, 7–11, 11–4 (3rd PSA title)	(Malaysia) Goh Zhi Xuan	(Japan) Erisa Sano (New Zealand) Kaitlyn Watts	(Australia) Erin Classen (Japan) Akari Midorikawa (India) Rathika Seelan (Australia) Pascale Louka
Santiago Open (Spain) O Milladoiro, Spain; Women: World Events – Copper; 24 players – $41,000	10–14 June	(Egypt) Malak Khafagy; 6–11, 11–3, 11–8, 9–11, 11–9 (5th PSA title)	(France) Camille Serme	(England) Torrie Malik (Egypt) Haya Ali	(United States) Marina Stefanoni (Colombia) Lucía Bautista (Egypt) Hana Ismail (Spain) Noa Romero
Aftab Jawaid Memorial Men's Open (United States) Houston, United States; Men: Challenger 15; 24 players – $15,000	11–15 June	(Egypt) Kareem El Torkey; 11–7, 12–10, 5–11, 11–9 (7th PSA title)	(Egypt) Moustafa El Sirty	(Pakistan) Ashab Irfan (England) Finnlay Withington	(Czech Republic) Viktor Byrtus (Pakistan) Tayyab Aslam (Egypt) Abdelrahman Nassar (Egypt) Hazem Hossam
República Dominicana Open (Dominican Republic) Santo Domingo, Dominican Republic; Men: Challenger 15; 24 players - $15,000	11–15 June	(Colombia) Matías Knudsen; 11–1, 11–8, 8–11, 11–9 (6th PSA title)	(Spain) Iván Pérez	(Guatemala) Alejandro Enríquez (England) Sam Todd	(England) Tom Walsh (England) Simon Herbert (Colombia) Ronald Palomino (Mexico) César Salazar
Open International Vendée (France) Challans, France; Men: Challenger 12; 24 players - $12,000	17–21 June	(France) Melvil Scianimanico; 11–7, 12–10, 11–7 (3rd PSA title)	(France) Benjamin Aubert	(France) Joshua Phinéra (Argentina) Jeremías Azaña	(France) Macéo Lévy (Brazil) Diego Gobbi (France) Brice Nicolas (Wales) Owain Taylor
Western Province Open (South Africa) Rondebosch, South Africa; Men: Challenger 3; 16 players – $3,000 −−−−−− Women: Challenger 3; 16 players – $3,000	18–21 June	(South Africa) Damian Groenewald; 6–11, 11–9, 4–11, 11–6, 11–9 (2nd PSA title)	(South Africa) Tristen Worth	(South Africa) John Anderson (South Africa) Mighael Lombard	(South Africa) Jarrod Cousins (South Africa) Devon Osborne (South Africa) Joseph Feast (South Africa) Nikhil Pather
Western Province Open (South Africa) Rondebosch, South Africa; Men: Challenger 3; 16 players – $3,000 −−−−−− Women: Challenger 3; 16 players – $3,000	18–21 June	(South Africa) Alexandra Fuller; 11–8, 11–9, 11–3 (10th PSA title)	(South Africa) Hayley Ward	(South Africa) Lara Patrick (South Africa) Siyoli Waters	(South Africa) Dené van Zyl (South Africa) Keschia Scorgie (South Africa) Megan Shannon (South Africa) Kaylee Hunt
Trident Homes South Island Open (New Zealand) Christchurch, New Zealand; Men: Challenger 6; 24 players – $6,000	18–22 June	(Netherlands) Rowan Damming; 6–11, 9–11, 11–6, 11–9, 11–6 (6th PSA title)	(New Zealand) Elijah Thomas	(Hong Kong) Leo Chung (Hong Kong) Lap Man Au	(Egypt) Ahmed Sherif (South Korea) Oh Seo-jin (Netherlands) Sam Gerrits (Scotland) Rory Richmond
Squash Project Costa Brava (Spain) Santa Cristina d'Aro, Spain; Men: Challenger 3; 24 players – $3,000 −−−−−− Women: Challenger 6; 24 players - $6,000	18–22 June	(England) Abdallah Eissa; 7–11, 11–4, 12–10, 11–5 (1st PSA title)	(Argentina) Segundo Portabales	(Spain) Hugo Lafuente (Canada) Karim Aguib	(England) Will Salter (Egypt) Taha ElShafei (Colombia) Mateo Restrepo (Poland) Jakub Pytlowany
Squash Project Costa Brava (Spain) Santa Cristina d'Aro, Spain; Men: Challenger 3; 24 players – $3,000 −−−−−− Women: Challenger 6; 24 players - $6,000	18–22 June	(Egypt) Farida Walid; 15–13, 9–11, 11–5, 11–4 (2nd PSA title)	(Egypt) Hana Ismail	(England) Amelie Haworth (Wales) Ellie Breach	(Poland) Sofi Zrazhevska (Argentina) Pilar Etchechoury (France) Lilou Brévard-Belliot (Switzerland) Ambre Allinckx
Life Time Mississauga Challenger (Canada) Mississauga, Canada; Men: Challenger 3; 24 players - $3,000 −−−−−− Women: Challenger 3; 16 players - $3,000	18–22 June	(Canada) Wasey Maqsood; 11–6, 11–4, 11–4 (1st PSA title)	(Ecuador) Javier Romo	(Canada) Maximilien Godbout (Chile) Matías Lacroix	(Canada) Abbas Nawaz (Canada) Blake Reinson (Canada) Mohammadreza Jafarzadeh (Canada) Elliott Hunt
Life Time Mississauga Challenger (Canada) Mississauga, Canada; Men: Challenger 3; 24 players - $3,000 −−−−−− Women: Challenger 3; 16 players - $3,000	18–22 June	(Colombia) Laura Tovar; 11–2, 11–6, 11–9 (4th PSA title)	(Canada) Samantha Cornett	(Poland) Karina Tyma (Guyana) Mary Fung-A-Fat	(Canada) Hannah Guthrie (Canada) Raya Singh (Canada) Aneesa Tejani (Canada) Young Lee
Copa do Brasil (Brazil) Ponta Grossa, Brazil; Men: Challenger 3; 16 players – $3,000 −−−−−− Women: Challenger 3; 16 players - $3,000	19–22 June	(Colombia) Juan José Torres; 9–11, 11–2, 11–7, 12–10 (1st PSA title)	(Brazil) Guilherme Melo	(Brazil) Pedro Mometto (Paraguay) Francesco Marcantonio	(Brazil) Gustavo Pizatto (Colombia) Alejandro Martínez (Brazil) Murilo Penteado (Brazil) Isaias Melo
Copa do Brasil (Brazil) Ponta Grossa, Brazil; Men: Challenger 3; 16 players – $3,000 −−−−−− Women: Challenger 3; 16 players - $3,000	19–22 June	(Paraguay) Fiorella Gatti; 11–9, 11–9, 9–11, 6–11, 11–9 (1st PSA title)	(Brazil) Laura Silva	(Brazil) Luiza Carbonieri (Brazil) Roberta Castro	(Brazil) Giulia Colleoni (Brazil) Paula Colleoni (Brazil) Juliana Pereira (Brazil) Marcela Terres
SmartCentres PSA World Tour Finals (Canada) Toronto, Canada; Men: World Tour Finals; 8 players – $224,500 – Draw −−−−−− Women: World Tour Finals; 8 players – $224,500 – Draw	23–27 June	(Wales) Joel Makin; 11–10, 11–7, 1–0^{rtd.} (1st PSA Finals title) (9th PSA title)	(Egypt) Mostafa Asal	(Peru) Diego Elías (Egypt) Karim Gawad	Round Robin: (New Zealand) Paul Coll (England) Marwan El Shorbagy (Egypt) Youssef Soliman (England) Mohamed El Shorbagy
SmartCentres PSA World Tour Finals (Canada) Toronto, Canada; Men: World Tour Finals; 8 players – $224,500 – Draw −−−−−− Women: World Tour Finals; 8 players – $224,500 – Draw	23–27 June	(Egypt) Nouran Gohar; 11–10, 9–11, 11–8, 11–3 (4th PSA Finals title) (36th PSA title)	(United States) Olivia Weaver	(Japan) Satomi Watanabe (England) Georgina Kennedy	Round Robin: (Egypt) Fayrouz Aboelkheir (Belgium) Tinne Gilis (Malaysia) Sivasangari Subramaniam (United States) Amanda Sobhy
Paris Montmartre PSA 15K (France) Paris, France; Women: Challenger 15; 24 players - $15,000	24–28 June	(Egypt) Nadien Elhammamy; 11–7, 12–14, 11–7, 13–11 (3rd PSA title)	(France) Camille Serme	(France) Lauren Baltayan (Hong Kong) Chan Sin Yuk	(England) Millie Tomlinson (Egypt) Nardine Garas (Switzerland) Ambre Allinckx (Malaysia) Yasshmita Jadishkumar
Gibraltar Open; Gibraltar; Men: Challenger 6; 24 players – $6,000 −−−−−− Women: Challenger 6; 24 players – $6,000	25–29 June	(France) Brice Nicolas; 11–9, 11–2, 11–5 (3rd PSA title)	(Canada) Karim Aguib	(France) Macéo Lévy (England) Robert Downer	(Germany) Valentin Rapp (Wales) Owain Taylor (Czech Republic) Ondřej Vorlíček (England) Will Salter
Gibraltar Open; Gibraltar; Men: Challenger 6; 24 players – $6,000 −−−−−− Women: Challenger 6; 24 players – $6,000	25–29 June	(South Africa) Hayley Ward; 9–11, 11–5, 11–8, 11–3 (2nd PSA title)	(England) Amelie Haworth	(France) Kara Lincou (Wales) Chloe Foster	(England) Polly Clark (England) Olivia Besant (Wales) Ellie Breach (Czech Republic) Tamara Holzbauerová
Trust Aoraki Midlands PSA (New Zealand) Temuka, New Zealand; Men: Challenger 6; 24 players – $6,000 −−−−−− Women: Challenger 3; 16 players – $3,000	25–29 June	(Netherlands) Rowan Damming; 13–11, 11–6, 10–12, 11–5 (7th PSA title)	(New Zealand) Elijah Thomas	(Egypt) Islam Kouritam (Malaysia) Hafiz Zhafri	(Egypt) Ahmed Sherif (Hong Kong) Lap Man Au (South Korea) Oh Seo-jin (Netherlands) Sam Gerrits
Trust Aoraki Midlands PSA (New Zealand) Temuka, New Zealand; Men: Challenger 6; 24 players – $6,000 −−−−−− Women: Challenger 3; 16 players – $3,000	25–29 June	(New Zealand) Ella Lash; 11–2, 11–1, 13–11 (1st PSA title)	(New Zealand) Jena Gregory	(England) Jasmine Thirst (New Zealand) Emma Merson	(New Zealand) Georgia Robcke (New Zealand) Lily Rae (England) Lowri Waugh (New Zealand) Maiden-Lee Coe
Maspeth Women's Open (United States) New York City, United States; Women: Challenger 6; 24 players – $6,000	25–29 June	(United States) Laila Sedky; 11–5, 11–5, 11–9 (2nd PSA title)	(Malaysia) Wen Li Lai	(United States) Charlotte Sze (Hungary) Gabriella Csókási	(Guyana) Mary Fung-A-Fat (United States) Isabella Tang (Canada) Sydney Maxwell (United States) Vivienne Sze
City of Greater Bendigo International (Australia) Bendigo, Australia; Men: Challenger 3; 24 players – $3,000 −−−−−− Women: Challenger 3; 16 players – $3,000	26–29 June	(France) Matteo Carrouget; 11–8, 8–11, 11–4, 11–8 (1st PSA title)	(Australia) Tate Norris	(Sri Lanka) Shamil Wakeel (Egypt) Mahmoud Ahmed	(Australia) David Turner (Scotland) Rory Richmond (Australia) Cameron Darton (Australia) Javed Ali
City of Greater Bendigo International (Australia) Bendigo, Australia; Men: Challenger 3; 24 players – $3,000 −−−−−− Women: Challenger 3; 16 players – $3,000	26–29 June	(Spain) Noa Romero; 11–3, 11–2, 11–7 (1st PSA title)	(Australia) Erin Classen	(Macau) Gigi Yeung (South Korea) Oh Sung-hee	(Australia) Joanne Joseph (Macau) Yeung Wai Leng (Pakistan) Noor-ul-Huda (Australia) Sophie Fadaely

=== July ===
Tournament	Date	Champion	Runner-Up	Semifinalists	Quarterfinalists
City of Greater Shepparton International (Australia) Shepparton, Australia; Men: Challenger 3; 16 players – $3,000 −−−−−− Women: Challenger 3; 16 players – $3,000	3–6 July	(Austria) Aqeel Rehman; 6–11, 11–2, 11–8, 11–5 (15th PSA title)	(Australia) Tate Norris	(Malta) Kijan Sultana (Belgium) Joeri Hapers	(Japan) Shota Yasunari (Scotland) Rory Richmond (France) Matteo Carrouget (Australia) Benjamin Ratcliffe
City of Greater Shepparton International (Australia) Shepparton, Australia; Men: Challenger 3; 16 players – $3,000 −−−−−− Women: Challenger 3; 16 players – $3,000	3–6 July	(Macau) Gigi Yeung; 11–5, 11–2, 11–5 (2nd PSA title)	(India) Rathika Seelan	(South Korea) Eum Hwa-yeong (Spain) Noa Romero	(Australia) Erin Classen (South Korea) Heo Min-gyeong (India) Shameena Riaz (South Korea) Oh Sung-hee
Harcourts KDRE Morrinsville Open (New Zealand) Morrinsville, New Zealand; Men: Challenger 6; 24 players – $6,000	8–12 July	(Malaysia) Addeen Idrakie; 7–11, 11–9, 9–11, 11–8, 11–4 (8th PSA title)	(Malaysia) Joachim Chuah	(Japan) Naoki Hayashi (Hong Kong) Matthew Lai	(Japan) Shota Yasunari (Australia) Bradley Fullick (Samoa) Mason Smales (Egypt) Ahmed Sherif
Paraguay Open; Asunción, Paraguay; Men: Challenger 6; 24 players – $6,000 −−−−−− Women: Challenger 6; 16 players – $6,000	8–12 July	(Colombia) Juan José Torres; 11–8, 12–10, 13–11 (2nd PSA title)	(Paraguay) Francesco Marcantonio	(Brazil) Guilherme Melo (Colombia) Edgar Ramírez	(Brazil) Pedro Mometto (United States) Christopher Gordon (Argentina) Segundo Portabales (Brazil) Vinicius Berbel
Paraguay Open; Asunción, Paraguay; Men: Challenger 6; 24 players – $6,000 −−−−−− Women: Challenger 6; 16 players – $6,000	8–12 July	(United States) Caroline Fouts; 11–3, 11–8, 11–4 (2nd PSA title)	(Paraguay) Fiorella Gatti	(Colombia) María Tovar (Colombia) Laura Tovar	(Brazil) Laura Silva (Argentina) Paula Rivero (Brazil) Luiza Carbonieri (Paraguay) Belén Saavedra
Geelong International (Australia) Geelong, Australia; Men: Challenger 3; 24 players – $3,000 −−−−−− Women: Challenger 3; 24 players – $3,000	10–13 July	(Malaysia) Nathan Kueh; 11–5, 11–8, 11–3 (1st PSA title)	(Australia) Connor Hayes	(Australia) Benjamin Ratcliffe (Australia) Tate Norris	(Australia) Thomas Scott (Belgium) Joeri Hapers (Scotland) Rory Richmond (Austria) Aqeel Rehman
Geelong International (Australia) Geelong, Australia; Men: Challenger 3; 24 players – $3,000 −−−−−− Women: Challenger 3; 24 players – $3,000	10–13 July	(Spain) Noa Romero; 11–6, 12–10, 11–7 (2nd PSA title)	(Malta) Colette Sultana	(India) Shameena Riaz (Macau) Gigi Yeung	(South Korea) Lee Ji-hyun (India) Pooja Arthi (South Korea) Heo Min-gyeong (India) Rathika Seelan
Victorian Open (Australia) Wheelers Hill, Australia; Men: Challenger 6; 24 players – $6,000 −−−−−− Women: Challenger 6; 24 players – $6,000	16–20 July	(Malaysia) Addeen Idrakie; 11–2, 11–4, 8–11, 11–3 (9th PSA title)	(Malaysia) Nathan Kueh	(Australia) Connor Hayes (Australia) Nicholas Calvert	(Scotland) Rory Richmond (Australia) Dylan Molinaro (Hong Kong) Ho Ka Hei (Australia) Rex Hedrick
Victorian Open (Australia) Wheelers Hill, Australia; Men: Challenger 6; 24 players – $6,000 −−−−−− Women: Challenger 6; 24 players – $6,000	16–20 July	(Spain) Noa Romero; 11–7, 11–5, 8–11, 6–11, 11–4 (3rd PSA title)	(Hong Kong) Ka Huen Leung	(Australia) Madison Lyon (Macau) Gigi Yeung	(Hong Kong) Wai Sze Wing (Hong Kong) Bobo Lam (South Korea) Heo Min-gyeong (India) Rathika Seelan
Orbit Cairo International Squash Base (Egypt) Nasr City, Egypt; Men: Challenger 9; 32 players – $9,000	22–26 July	(Egypt) Yassin ElShafei; 11–9, 7–11, 11–8, 4–11, 11–7 (8th PSA title)	(Egypt) Omar Said	(Egypt) Salman Khalil (Egypt) Ziad Ibrahim	(Egypt) Aly Hussein (Egypt) Seif Tamer (Egypt) Yassin Shohdy (Egypt) Khaled Labib
9th Jahangir Khan PSA Challenger (Pakistan) Karachi, Pakistan; Men: Challenger 3; 32 players – $3,000	22–26 July	(Pakistan) Tayyab Aslam; 11–4, 11–6, 11–5 (12th PSA title)	(Pakistan) Ammad Gul	(Pakistan) Sadam ul Haq (Pakistan) Varun Asif	(Pakistan) Sakhiullah Tareen (Pakistan) Hassan Paracha (Pakistan) Azan Ali Khan (Pakistan) Khakan Malik
2nd Guatemala Open; Guatemala City, Guatemala; Men: Challenger 15; 32 players – $15,000	23–27 July	(Colombia) Juan José Torres; 5–11, 11–6, 11–8, 11–13, 15–13 (3rd PSA title)	(Egypt) Mohamed Nasser	(Guatemala) Alejandro Enríquez (France) Melvil Scianimanico	(Mexico) Sebastián Salazar (Guatemala) Luis Quisquinay (Wales) Rhys Evans (Guatemala) Josué Enríquez
Maspeth Men's Open (United States) New York City, United States; Men: Challenger 6; 32 players – $6,000	23–27 July	(Nigeria) Onaopemipo Adegoke; 7–11, 11–8, 11–4, 5–11, 11–9 (3rd PSA title)	(Egypt) Abdelrahman Nassar	(Egypt) Kareem Badawi (Nigeria) Gabriel Olufunmilayo	(India) Abhishek Agarwal (Egypt) Ali El Toukhy (Chile) Matías Lacroix (Malaysia) Nathan Kueh
PSA Valencia (Spain) Alboraya, Spain; Men: Challenger 15; 32 players - $15,000	29 Jul. – 2 Aug.	(Spain) Iker Pajares; 11–8, 11–5, 11–4 (12th PSA title)	(Pakistan) Hamza Khan	(France) Joshua Phinéra (Spain) Iván Pérez	(Argentina) Leandro Romiglio (France) Brice Nicolas (Hong Kong) Matthew Lai (England) Perry Malik
PSA Sekwoja Open (Poland) Białystok, Poland; Men: Challenger 6; 32 players - $6,000	29 Jul. – 2 Aug.	(Egypt) Mohamed Gohar; 11–8, 9–11, 11–8, 11–4 (1st PSA title)	(Egypt) Mazen Gamal	(Canada) Karim Aguib (Egypt) Shady El Sherbiny	(Egypt) Marwan Tamer (England) Jared Carter (Switzerland) Louai Hafez (Netherlands) Piëdro Schweertman
Bio Por Cento Squash Challenger (Brazil) São Paulo, Brazil; Men: Challenger 3; 16 players - $3,000	30 Jul. – 2 Aug.	(Argentina) Miguel Pujol; 2–11, 11–2, 11–8, 11–3 (3rd PSA title)	(Brazil) Murilo Penteado	(Brazil) Vinicius Berbel (Colombia) Alejandro Martínez	(Brazil) Gustavo Pizatto (Chile) Lucas Pérez (Brazil) Junior Christovam (Brazil) Gustavo dos Santos
Eastside Open (Australia) Bellerive, Australia; Men: Challenger 6; 32 players – $6,000 −−−−−− Women: Challenger 3; 32 players – $3,000	30 Jul. – 3 Aug.	(Hong Kong) Wong Chi Him; 4–11, 11–7, 11–1, 11–9 (10th PSA title)	(Hong Kong) Leo Chung	(South Korea) Ryu Jeong-min (Belgium) Joeri Hapers	(Australia) Brendan MacDonald (Australia) Tate Norris (Australia) Bradley Fullick (Samoa) Mason Smales
Eastside Open (Australia) Bellerive, Australia; Men: Challenger 6; 32 players – $6,000 −−−−−− Women: Challenger 3; 32 players – $3,000	30 Jul. – 3 Aug.	(Macau) Gigi Yeung; 11–3, 5–11, 11–7, 12–14, 11–2 (3rd PSA title)	(South Korea) Heo Min-gyeong	(Malaysia) Zoe Foo (Japan) Erisa Sano	(Australia) Madison Lyon (Canada) Iman Shaheen (Spain) Noa Romero (South Korea) Jun Ah-in

== Statistical information ==
The players/nations are sorted by:

1. Total number of titles;
2. Cumulated importance of those titles;
3. Alphabetical order (by family names for players).

=== Key ===
World Championship/PSA Finals
World Events Diamond
World Events Platinum
World Events Gold
World Events Silver
World Events Bronze
World Events Copper
Challenger Events 3/6/9/12/15

=== Titles won by player (men's) ===
Total	Player	World Ch. / PSA Finals	Diamond	Platinum	Gold	Silver	Bronze	Copper	Challenger 15	Challenger 12	Challenger 9	Challenger 6	Challenger 3
7	Mostafa Asal (EGY)	●	●	●●●	●●								
5	Ali Farag (EGY)			●●	●●●								
5	Mohamed Sharaf (EGY)										●	●●	●●
3	Joel Makin (WAL)	●			●	●							
3	Marwan El Shorbagy (ENG)					●	●●						
3	Kareem El Torkey (EGY)							●	●●				
3	Ashab Irfan (PAK)								●●		●		
3	Veer Chotrani (IND)								●●			●	
3	Salman Khalil (EGY)								●		●	●	
3	Sam Todd (ENG)								●			●●	
3	Juan José Torres (COL)								●			●	●
3	Sam Osborne-Wylde (ENG)									●			●●
3	Yassin Shohdy (EGY)											●●	●
3	Ravindu Laksiri (SRI)												●●●
2	Diego Elías (PER)		●	●									
2	Karim Gawad (EGY)				●		●						
2	Paul Coll (NZL)					●●							
2	Mohamed El Shorbagy (ENG)					●	●						
2	Leonel Cárdenas (MEX)						●	●					
2	Greg Lobban (SCO)							●●					
2	Mohamad Zakaria (EGY)							●●					
2	Declan James (ENG)							●	●				
2	Noor Zaman (PAK)								●●				
2	Matías Knudsen (COL)								●	●			
2	Abhay Singh (IND)								●	●			
2	Yannick Wilhelmi (SUI)								●	●			
2	Yassin ElShafei (EGY)								●		●		
2	Ronald Palomino (COL)								●			●	
2	Toufik Mekhalfi (FRA)									●	●		
2	Brice Nicolas (FRA)									●		●	
2	Omar Said (EGY)										●	●	
2	Zahed Salem (EGY)										●	●	
2	Onaopemipo Adegoke (NGR)											●●	
2	David Bernet (SUI)											●●	
2	Álvaro Buenaño (ECU)											●●	
2	Rowan Damming (NED)											●●	
2	Addeen Idrakie (MYS)											●●	
2	Edmon López (ESP)											●	●
2	Jakub Solnický (CZE)											●	●
2	Damian Groenewald (RSA)												●●
2	Ho Ka Hei (HKG)												●●
2	Miguel Pujol (ARG)												●●
2	Will Salter (ENG)												●●
2	Dewald van Niekerk (RSA)												●●
1	Victor Crouin (FRA)						●						
1	Tarek Momen (EGY)						●						
1	Eain Yow (MYS)						●						
1	Abdulla Al-Tamimi (QAT)							●					
1	Sébastien Bonmalais (FRA)							●					
1	Jonah Bryant (ENG)							●					
1	Asim Khan (PAK)							●					
1	Jeremías Azaña (ARG)								●				
1	Moustafa El Sirty (EGY)								●				
1	Jorge Gómez (MEX)								●				
1	Raphael Kandra (GER)								●				
1	Charlie Lee (ENG)								●				
1	Curtis Malik (ENG)								●				
1	Iker Pajares (ESP)								●				
1	Rory Stewart (SCO)								●				
1	Ryūnosuke Tsukue (JPN)								●				
1	Melvil Scianimanico (FRA)									●			
1	Velavan Senthilkumar (IND)									●			
1	Nick Wall (ENG)									●			
1	Ameeshenraj Chandaran (MYS)										●		
1	Francesco Marcantonio (PAR)										●		
1	Mohamed Nasser (EGY)										●		
1	Omar Sobhy (EGY)										●		
1	Sam Buckley (IRE)											●	
1	Suraj Chand (IND)											●	
1	Wong Chi Him (HKG)											●	
1	Saurav Ghosal (IND)											●	
1	Andrés Herrera (COL)											●	
1	Ziad Ibrahim (EGY)											●	
1	Hamza Khan (PAK)											●	
1	Nathan Lake (ENG)											●	
1	Duncan Lee (MYS)											●	
1	Macéo Lévy (FRA)											●	
1	Iván Pérez (ESP)											●	
1	Darren Pragasam (MYS)											●	
1	Lam Shing Fung (HKG)											●	
1	Abdullah Al-Muzayen (KUW)												●
1	Tayyab Aslam (PAK)												●
1	Ahsan Ayaz (PAK)												●
1	Muhammad Azhar (MYS)												●
1	Baptiste Bouin (FRA)												●
1	Jesús Camacho (MEX)												●
1	Matteo Carrouget (FRA)												●
1	Jared Carter (ENG)												●
1	Harith Danial (MYS)												●
1	Abdallah Eissa (ENG)												●
1	Shady El Sherbiny (EGY)												●
1	Tomotaka Endo (JPN)												●
1	Sepehr Etemadpoor (IRI)												●
1	Denis Gilevskiy (IRE)												●
1	Louai Hafez (SUI)												●
1	Elliott Hunt (CAN)												●
1	Nathan Kueh (MYS)												●
1	Bailey Malik (ENG)												●
1	Wasey Maqsood (CAN)												●
1	Liam Marrison (CAN)												●
1	Gabriel Olufunmilayo (NGR)												●
1	Aqeel Rehman (AUT)												●
1	Brett Schille (CAN)												●
1	James Willstrop (ENG)												●

=== Titles won by nation (men's) ===
Total	Nation	World Ch. / PSA Finals	Diamond	Platinum	Gold	Silver	Bronze	Copper	Challenger 15	Challenger 12	Challenger 9	Challenger 6	Challenger 3
42	Egypt (EGY)	●	●	●●●●●	●●●●●●		●●	●●●	●●●●●		●●●●●●●	●●●●●●●●	●●●●
24	England (ENG)					●●	●●●	●●	●●●●	●●		●●●	●●●●●●●●
10	France (FRA)						●	●		●●●	●	●●	●●
9	Malaysia (MYS)						●				●	●●●●	●●●
9	Pakistan (PAK)							●	●●●●		●	●	●●
8	India (IND)								●●●	●●		●●●	
8	Colombia (COL)								●●●	●		●●●	●
5	Switzerland (SUI)								●	●		●●	●
4	Mexico (MEX)						●	●	●				●
4	Spain (ESP)								●			●●	●
4	Hong Kong (HKG)											●●	●●
4	Canada (CAN)												●●●●
4	South Africa (RSA)												●●●●
3	Wales (WAL)	●			●	●							
3	Scotland (SCO)							●●	●				
3	Argentina (ARG)								●				●●
3	Nigeria (NGR)											●●	●
3	Sri Lanka (SRI)												●●●
2	Peru (PER)		●	●									
2	New Zealand (NZL)					●●							
2	Japan (JPN)								●				●
2	Ecuador (ECU)											●●	
2	Netherlands (NED)											●●	
2	Czech Republic (CZE)											●	●
2	Ireland (IRE)											●	●
1	Qatar (QAT)							●					
1	Germany (GER)								●				
1	Paraguay (PAR)										●		
1	Austria (AUT)												●
1	Iran (IRI)												●
1	Kuwait (KUW)												●

=== Titles won by player (women's) ===
Total	Player	World Ch. / PSA Finals	Diamond	Platinum	Gold	Silver	Bronze	Copper	Challenger 15	Challenger 12	Challenger 9	Challenger 6	Challenger 3
8	Nouran Gohar (EGY)	●	●	●●●	●●●								
8	Anahat Singh (IND)								●●		●	●●	●●●
4	Nour El Sherbini (EGY)	●	●	●●									
3	Olivia Weaver (USA)				●●		●						
3	Amina Orfi (EGY)				●	●	●						
3	Mélissa Alves (FRA)							●●●					
3	Habiba Hani (EGY)										●●	●	
3	Toby Tse (HKG)										●	●●	
3	Lauren Baltayan (FRA)											●●●	
3	Kirstie Wong (HKG)											●●	●
3	Noa Romero (ESP)											●	●●
3	Cristina Tartarone (ITA)												●●●
2	Hania El Hammamy (EGY)			●	●								
2	Amanda Sobhy (USA)						●●						
2	Tesni Murphy (WAL)							●●					
2	Aira Azman (MYS)							●	●				
2	Marina Stefanoni (USA)							●	●				
2	Yee Xin Ying (MYS)								●●				
2	Camille Serme (FRA)									●●			
2	Zeina Zein (EGY)									●	●		
2	Nour Megahed (EGY)										●	●	
2	Barb Sameh (EGY)											●●	
2	Laila Sedky (USA)											●	●
2	Farida Walid (EGY)											●	●
2	Gigi Yeung (MAC)												●●
1	Rachel Arnold (MYS)					●							
1	Tinne Gilis (BEL)					●							
1	Sivasangari Subramaniam (MYS)					●							
1	Satomi Watanabe (JPN)					●							
1	Fayrouz Aboelkheir (EGY)						●						
1	Salma Hany (EGY)						●						
1	Farida Mohamed (EGY)						●						
1	Jasmine Hutton (ENG)							●					
1	Katie Malliff (ENG)							●					
1	Malak Khafagy (EGY)							●					
1	Zeina Mickawy (EGY)							●					
1	Nadien Elhammamy (EGY)								●				
1	Nardine Garas (EGY)								●				
1	Ainaa Amani (MYS)									●			
1	Akanksha Salunkhe (IND)									●			
1	Chan Sin Yuk (HKG)									●			
1	Lisa Aitken (SCO)										●		
1	Wai Yhann Au Yeong (SGP)											●	
1	Lucía Bautista (COL)											●	
1	Alina Bushma (UKR)											●	
1	Hannah Craig (IRE)											●	
1	Amina El Rihany (EGY)											●	
1	Caroline Fouts (USA)											●	
1	Heylie Fung (HKG)											●	
1	Yasshmita Jadishkumar (MYS)											●	
1	Nour Khafagy (EGY)											●	
1	Jana Swaify (EGY)											●	
1	Hayley Ward (RSA)											●	
1	Ambre Allinckx (SUI)												●
1	Olivia Besant (ENG)												●
1	Olatunji Busayo (NGR)												●
1	Emily Coulcher-Porter (ENG)												●
1	Fereshteh Eghtedari (IRI)												●
1	Sophie Fadaely (AUS)												●
1	Alexandra Fuller (RSA)												●
1	Fiorella Gatti (PAR)												●
1	Ella Lash (NZL)												●
1	Madison Lyon (AUS)												●
1	Nadia Pfister (SUI)												●
1	Karolína Šrámková (CZE)												●
1	Colette Sultana (MLT)												●
1	Laura Tovar (COL)												●
1	Karina Tyma (POL)												●

=== Titles won by nation (women's) ===
Total	Nation	World Ch. / PSA Finals	Diamond	Platinum	Gold	Silver	Bronze	Copper	Challenger 15	Challenger 12	Challenger 9	Challenger 6	Challenger 3
38	Egypt (EGY)	●●	●●	●●●●●●	●●●●●	●	●●●●	●●	●●	●	●●●●	●●●●●●●●	●
10	United States (USA)				●●		●●●	●	●			●●	●
9	India (IND)								●●	●	●	●●	●●●
8	Malaysia (MYS)					●●		●	●●●	●		●	
8	France (FRA)							●●●		●●		●●●	
8	Hong Kong (HKG)									●	●	●●●●●	●
4	England (ENG)							●●					●●
3	Spain (ESP)											●	●●
3	Italy (ITA)												●●●
2	Wales (WAL)							●●					
2	Colombia (COL)											●	●
2	South Africa (RSA)											●	●
2	Australia (AUS)												●●
2	Macau (MAC)												●●
2	Switzerland (SUI)												●●
1	Belgium (BEL)					●							
1	Japan (JPN)					●							
1	Scotland (SCO)										●		
1	Ireland (IRE)											●	
1	Singapore (SGP)											●	
1	Ukraine (UKR)											●	
1	Czech Republic (CZE)												●
1	Iran (IRI)												●
1	Malta (MLT)												●
1	New Zealand (NZL)												●
1	Nigeria (NGR)												●
1	Paraguay (PAR)												●
1	Poland (POL)												●

== Comebacks ==
- (France) Camille Serme

== Retirements ==
Following is a list of notable players (winners of a main tour title, and/or part of the PSA Men's World Rankings and Women's World Rankings top 30 for at least one month) who announced their retirement from professional squash, became inactive, or were permanently banned from playing, during the 2024–25 season:

- (Egypt) Ali Farag
- (England) Sarah-Jane Perry
- (Egypt) Tarek Momen

== Current world top 10 players ==
=== Men's world ranking ===
PSA Men's World Rankings as of 1 September 2025
Rank	Player	Points	Move^{†}
1	Mostafa Asal (EGY)	2,338	Steady
2	Diego Elías (PER)	1,631	Steady
3	Paul Coll (NZL)	1,153	Steady
4	Joel Makin (WAL)	1,096	Steady
5	Marwan Elshorbagy (ENG)	847	Steady
6	Karim Gawad (EGY)	811	Steady
7	Mohamed Elshorbagy (ENG)	794	Steady
8	Youssef Soliman (EGY)	616	Steady
9	Aly Abou Eleinen (EGY)	580	Steady
10	Youssef Ibrahim (EGY)	578	Steady

=== Women's world ranking ===
PSA Women's World Rankings, of the 5 January 2026
Rank	Player	Average	Move^{†}
1	Hania El Hammamy (EGY)	1,791	Steady
2	Nouran Gohar (EGY)	1,578	Steady
3	Amina Orfi (EGY)	1,455	Steady
4	Nour El Sherbini (EGY)	1,324	Steady
5	Olivia Weaver (USA)	1,284	Steady
6	Satomi Watanabe (JPN)	881	Steady
7	Sivasangari Subramaniam (MAS)	869	Steady
8	Tinne Gilis (BEL)	755	Steady
9	Fayrouz Aboelkheir (EGY)	753	Steady
10	Georgina Kennedy (ENG)	741	Steady

== See also ==
- 2024–25 PSA World Events Finals
- 2025 Men's PSA World Events Finals
- 2025 Women's PSA World Events Finals
- 2024 in squash
- 2025 in squash
