= 2026–27 PSA Squash Tour =

International squash tour

Details
- Event name: PSA Squash Tour 2026–27
- Dates: August 2026 – July 2027
- Categories: World Championship: Men's/Women's; PSA Squash Tour Finals: Men's/Women's; PSA Challenger Events; Satellite & Federation Events
- Website; PSA Squash Tour

Achievements
- World Number 1: Men: Women:
- World Champion: Men: [[ ]] Women: [[ ]]

The 2026–27 PSA Squash Tour is the international squash tour organised circuit organized by the Professional Squash Association (PSA) for the 2026–27 squash season. It's the 12th PSA season since the merger of PSA and WSA associations in 2015.

The most important tournaments in the series are the PSA World Championship for Men's and Women's. The tour also features two circuits of regular events—PSA World Events (formerly PSA World Tour), which feature the highest prize money and the best fields; and PSA Challenger Events with prize money ranging $3,000–$15,000. In the middle of the year (usually in June), the PSA Squash Tour - World Events tour is concluded by the Men's & Women's PSA Squash Tour Finals in a to be determined venue, the season-ending championships for the top 8 rated players from PSA World Events level tournaments.

== Overview ==
=== PSA World Events changes ===
Starting in August 2024, PSA revamped its professional tour structure into two individual circuits; PSA World Events and PSA Challenger Events.

PSA World Events (formerly PSA World Tour) will comprise the most important tournaments in prize money for more experienced and higher-ranked players, including PSA World Championships and PSA Squash Tour Finals, labeled as follows:

- PSA World Championships — 64-players draw — $600,000
- PSA Squash Tour Finals — 8-players draw — $300,000
- PSA World Events Diamond — 48-player draw — $300,000 - (starting August 2024)
- PSA World Events Platinum — 32-players draw — $190,000
- PSA World Events Gold — 24-players draw — $100,000
- PSA World Events Silver — 24-players draw — $75,000
- PSA World Events Bronze — 24-players draw — $50,000
- PSA World Events Copper — 24-player draw — $25,000 - (starting August 2024)

PSA Challenger Events (formerly Challenger Tour) tournaments will offer a $3,000–$18,000 prize money, an ideal circuit for less-experienced and upcoming players, that will include the following tiers:

- PSA Challenger Events 18 — $18,000
- PSA Challenger Events 15 — $15,000
- PSA Challenger Events 12 — $12,000
- PSA Challenger Events 9 — $9,000
- PSA Challenger Events 6 — $6,000
- PSA Challenger Events 3 — $3,000

=== Prize money/ranking points breakdown ===
PSA Squash Tour events also have a separate World Events ranking. Points for this are calculated on a cumulative basis after each World Events event. The top eight players at the end of the calendar year are then eligible to play in the PSA Squash Tour Finals.

Ranking points vary according to tournament tier being awarded as follows:

PSA World Championships			Ranking Points
Rank	Prize money US$	Ranking Points	Winner	Runner up	3/4	5/8	9/16	17/32	33/64
PSA World Championships	$600,000	27683 points	3500	2275	1400	875	525	321	196
PSA Squash Tour Finals			Ranking Points
Rank	Prize money US$	Winner	Runner up	3/4	Round-Robin Match Win	Undefeated bonus
PSA Squash Tour Finals	$300,000	1000	550	200	150	150
PSA World Events			Ranking Points
Rank	Prize money US$	Ranking Points	Winner	Runner up	3/4	5/8	9/16	17/32	33/48
Diamond	$300,000	24511 points	3100	2015	1240	775	465	284	173.5
Platinum	$190,000	17132 points	2800	1820	1120	700	420	257
Gold	$100,000	11010 points	1800	1170	720	450	270	165
Silver	$75,000	8261.5 points	1350	877.5	540	337.5	202.5	124
Bronze	$50,000	5505 points	900	585	360	225	135	82.5
Copper	$25,000	3061 points	500	325	200	125	75	46
PSA Challenger Events			Ranking Points
Rank	Prize money US$	Ranking Points	Winner	Runner up	3/4	5/8	9/16	17/32	33/48
Challenger Events 15	$15,000	1835 points	300	195	120	75	45	27.5
Challenger Events 12	$12,000	1468 points	240	156	96	60	36	22
Challenger Events 9	$9,000	1101 points	180	117	72	45	27	16.5
Challenger Events 6	$6,000	734 points	120	78	48	30	18	11
Challenger Events 3	$3,000	367 points	60	39	24	15	9	5.5
PSA Satellite Events			Ranking Points
Rank	Prize money US$	Ranking Points	Winner	Runner up	3/4	5/8	9/16	17/32	33/64
PSA Satellite Events	$1,000 – $3,000	183.5 points	30	19.5	12	7.5	4.5	2.75

== Calendar ==
=== Key ===
PSA Tiers
World Championship
World Events Diamond
World Events Platinum
World Events Gold
World Events Silver
World Events Bronze
World Events Copper
Challenger Events 3/6/9/12/15

=== August ===
Tournament	Date	Champion	Runner-Up	Semifinalists	Quarterfinalists
Victorian Open (Australia) Wheelers Hill, Australia; Men: Challenger 6; 32 players – $6,000 −−−−−− Women: Challenger 6; 32 players – $6,000	29 Jul.–2 Aug.	(Wales) Owain Taylor; 8–11, 11–3, 11–2, 11–5 (5th PSA title)	(Australia) Dylan Molinaro	(Canada) Karim Aguib (New Zealand) Freddie Jameson	(Australia) Nicholas Calvert (Egypt) Omar Helmy (Australia) Brendan MacDonald (South Korea) Ryu Jeong-min
Victorian Open (Australia) Wheelers Hill, Australia; Men: Challenger 6; 32 players – $6,000 −−−−−− Women: Challenger 6; 32 players – $6,000	29 Jul.–2 Aug.	(South Korea) Heo Min-gyeong; 11–9, 12–10, 4–11, 5–11, 12–10 (1st PSA title)	(India) Sanya Vats	(Japan) Erisa Sano (Australia) Sarah Cardwell	(Macau) Yeung Wai Leng (Australia) Erin Classen (New Zealand) Maiden-Lee Coe (Australia) Alex Haydon
Dallas Squash Challenger (United States) Plano, United States; Men: Challenger 6; 32 players – $6,000	30 Jul.–2 Aug.	(Nigeria) Onaopemipo Adegoke; 6–11, 11–7, 9–11, 11–7, 11–8 (5th PSA title)	(Colombia) Juan José Torres	(United States) Tad Carney (Pakistan) Huzaifa Ibrahim	(Egypt) Kareem Badawi (Egypt) Taha ElShafei (Nigeria) Gabriel Olufunmilayo (United States) Bransten Ming
Pakistan Navy Fleet Club Squash Open; Karachi, Pakistan; Men : World Events – Copper; 32 players – $41,000	31 Jul.–4 Aug.	(Egypt) Salman Khalil; 14–12, 11–3, 13–11 (6th PSA title)	(Pakistan) Nasir Iqbal	(Pakistan) Asim Khan (Egypt) Yassin ElShafei	(Pakistan) Hamza Khan (Egypt) Aly Tolba (Pakistan) Noor Zaman (Egypt) Mohamed Nasser
Assore Tour #2 (South Africa) Johannesburg, South Africa; Men: Challenger 6; 32 players – $6,000 −−−−−− Women: Challenger 6; 32 players – $6,000	4–8 August	(Egypt) Adham Roshdy; 11–5, 1–0^{rtd.} (2nd PSA title)	(Egypt) Seif Shenawy	(Egypt) Ahmed Sherif (South Africa) Luhann Groenewald	(Egypt) Ahmed Elbeshouty (South Africa) Ethan Robinson (South Africa) Damian Groenewald (Zimbabwe) Ryan Gwidzima
Assore Tour #2 (South Africa) Johannesburg, South Africa; Men: Challenger 6; 32 players – $6,000 −−−−−− Women: Challenger 6; 32 players – $6,000	4–8 August	(Egypt) Amira Elrefaey; 11–13, 12–10, 5–11, 11–9, 11–5 (2nd PSA title)	(Egypt) Hana Aladdin	(Egypt) Nadia Mahmoud (Egypt) Malak Samir	(South Africa) Lara Patrick (South Africa) Lojayn Gohary (South Africa) Keschia Scorgie (South Africa) Bianke Pienaar
Bay Club Santa Clara Open (United States) Santa Clara, United States; Men: Challenger 3; 32 players – $3,000	5–9 August	(United States) Ahmad Haq; 8–11, 11–6, 11–8, 2–11, 13–11 (1st PSA title)	(Egypt) Omar Azzam	(Canada) Emilio Carrillo (United States) Zain Ahmed	(United States) Varun Fuloria (United States) Zane McGee-Lowdermilk (United States) Arjya Saha (United States) Sharif Khan
Ballarat Open (Australia) Wendouree, Australia; Men: Challenger 3; 32 players – $3,000 −−−−−− Women: Challenger 3; 32 players – $3,000	6–9 August	(Egypt) Omar Helmy; 11–5, 11–3, 11–3 (1st PSA title)	(Australia) Benjamin Ratcliffe	(New Zealand) Thomas Marshall (Australia) James Lloyd	(England) Jack Webster (Bahrain) Yusuf Thani (Hong Kong) Rain Wong (Hong Kong) Anson Wong
Ballarat Open (Australia) Wendouree, Australia; Men: Challenger 3; 32 players – $3,000 −−−−−− Women: Challenger 3; 32 players – $3,000	6–9 August	(Australia) Sarah Cardwell; 11–6, 11–8, 11–6 (4th PSA title)	(India) Sanya Vats	(Australia) Tina Ma (South Korea) Jun Ah-in	(South Korea) Oh Sung-hee (Macau) Yeung Wai Leng (Australia) Joanne Joseph (Australia) Darcie Blaber
China Squash Tour #1; Chengdu, China; Men: Challenger 3; 32 players – $3,000 −−−−−− Women: Challenger 9; 32 players – $9,000	6–10 August	(South Korea) Na Joo-young; 11–5, 11–9, 11–9 (1st PSA title)	(South Korea) Lee Jong-hyeok	(Hong Kong) Mak Tsun Hei (Hong Kong) Tommy Tam	(Japan) Shota Yasunari (Hong Kong) Jat Tse (England) James Peach (China) Liang Haocong
China Squash Tour #1; Chengdu, China; Men: Challenger 3; 32 players – $3,000 −−−−−− Women: Challenger 9; 32 players – $9,000	6–10 August	(Malaysia) Harleein Tan; 10–12, 11–8, 11–7, 11–9 (2nd PSA title)	(United States) Isabella Tang	(Macau) Gigi Yeung (Malaysia) Zoe Foo	(Malaysia) Thanusaa Uthrian (Malaysia) Rui Jean Yek (Hong Kong) Wai Sze Wing (Singapore) Au Yeong Wai Yhann
HCL PSA Challenger Tour (India) Kolkata, India; Men: Challenger 9; 32 players – $9,000 −−−−−− Women: Challenger 9; 32 players – $9,000	10–14 August	(Egypt) Seif Refaay; 6–11, 11–7, 11–7, 11–4 (3rd PSA title)	(Egypt) Mohamed Gohar	(Egypt) Ahmed Sobhy (India) Suraj Chand	(India) Shaurya Bawa (Egypt) Hazem Hossam (India) Om Semwal (India) Sandhesh Ravikumar
HCL PSA Challenger Tour (India) Kolkata, India; Men: Challenger 9; 32 players – $9,000 −−−−−− Women: Challenger 9; 32 players – $9,000	10–14 August	(Egypt) Sohayla Hazem; 10–12, 11–8, 11–7, 11–9 (3rd PSA title)	(Egypt) Menna Walid	(Czech Republic) Karolína Šrámková (India) Tanvi Khanna	(India) Unnati Tripathi (India) Nirupama Dubey (India) Rathika Seelan (India) Ananya Narayanan
White Bear Open (United States) North Sea, United States; Men: Challenger 6; 32 players - $6,000	13–16 August	(Egypt) Kareem Badawi; 11–6, 11–4, 3–11, 11–6 (3rd PSA title)	(United States) Hollis Robertson	(Egypt) Mohamed Nawar (Pakistan) Muhammad Ammad	(United States) Hart Robertson (Canada) Kent Rawlins (United States) Hao Cui (United States) Quinlan Jeudy
Bendigo Open (Australia) Bendigo, Australia; Men: Challenger 3; 32 players – $3,000 −−−−−− Women: Challenger 3; 16 players – $3,000	13–16 August	(Egypt) Omar Helmy; 11–5, 11–7, 13–15, 11–1 (2nd PSA title)	(Australia) James Lloyd	(Malaysia) Bryan Lim (Bahrain) Yusuf Thani	(Australia) Gianluca Bushell-O'Connor (New Zealand) Thomas Marshall (New Zealand) Bryce McMullen (Australia) Lachlan Coxsedge
Bendigo Open (Australia) Bendigo, Australia; Men: Challenger 3; 32 players – $3,000 −−−−−− Women: Challenger 3; 16 players – $3,000	13–16 August	(Pakistan) Sana Bahadar; 2–11, 11–2, 12–10, 11–9 (1st PSA title)	(Australia) Rachael Grinham	(India) Sanya Vats (Australia) Shona Coxsedge	(Australia) Tina Ma (Australia) Joanne Joseph (Australia) Maria Kalafatis (England) Zoe Tanner
Saudi Squash Fed Challenger #2 (Saudi Arabia) Riyadh, Saudi Arabia; Men: Challenger 3; 16 players – $3,000	20–22 August	(Saudi Arabia) Mohammed Nasfan; 2–11, 11–2, 12–10, 11–9 (1st PSA title)	(Kuwait) Ammar Al-Tamimi	(Kuwait) Seif Wael (Kuwait) Bader Almaghrebi	(Kuwait) Abdulrahman Almaghrebi (Saudi Arabia) Hassan Dawood (Pakistan) Suleman Jilani (Egypt) Abdelrahman Abdelkhalek
Budapest Open (Hungary) Budapest, Hungary; Men: World Events – Copper; 32 players – $43,500	24–28 August	(India) Velavan Senthilkumar; 11–4, 11–2, 11–3 (11th PSA title)	(Hungary) Balázs Farkas	(India) Veer Chotrani (Egypt) Moustafa El Sirty	(Egypt) Mohamed ElSherbini (Qatar) Abdulla Al-Tamimi (Malaysia) Eain Yow (Japan) Ryūnosuke Tsukue
Tuanku Muhriz Trophy (Malaysia) Seremban, Malaysia; Men: Challenger 15; 32 players - $15,000 −−−−−− Women: Challenger 15; 32 players - $15,000	26–30 August	(India) Abhay Singh; 11–7, 6–11, 3–11, 11–5, 12–10 (13th PSA title)	(Hong Kong) Henry Leung	(Hong Kong) Alex Lau (Malaysia) Ameeshenraj Chandaran	(Egypt) Mohamed Sharaf (Malaysia) Syafiq Kamal (Pakistan) Asim Khan (Malaysia) Siow Yee Xian
Tuanku Muhriz Trophy (Malaysia) Seremban, Malaysia; Men: Challenger 15; 32 players - $15,000 −−−−−− Women: Challenger 15; 32 players - $15,000	26–30 August	(Egypt) Sohayla Hazem; 11–4, 11–2, 11–9 (4th PSA title)	(Hong Kong) Heylie Fung	(Egypt) Nour Khafagy (Hong Kong) Toby Tse	(Malaysia) Zoe Foo (Malaysia) Ainaa Amani (Egypt) Habiba Hani (Hong Kong) Cheng Nga Ching
Sindh Squash Challenger #1 (Pakistan) Karachi, Pakistan; Men: Challenger 6; 32 players – $6,000	26–30 August	(Pakistan) Nasir Iqbal; 6–11, 13–11, 11–2, 11–9 (19th PSA title)	(Pakistan) Abdullah Nawaz	(Pakistan) Tayyab Aslam (Egypt) Omar Elkattan	(Pakistan) Saeed Abdul (Pakistan) Nasir Iqbal (Pakistan) Anas Khan (Pakistan) Shamlan Gul
Life Time Colleyville Open (United States) Colleyville, United States; Men: Challenger 3; 32 players – $3,000	26–30 August	(Pakistan) Huzaifa Ibrahim; 11–5, 11–8, 4–11, 11–0 (1st PSA title)	(Mexico) Carlos Zendejas	(Egypt) Ismail Amr Abdellatif (Mexico) Wally de los Santos	(South Africa) Brad Lodge (United States) Christopher Gordon (Mexico) Erik Castillo (United States) Affan Rafique
US Challenger Series #1 (United States) Philadelphia, United States; Men: Challenger 3; 12 players - $3,000 −−−−−− Women: Challenger 3; 12 players - $3,000	28–31 August	(United States) Yaseen Shalaby; 11–9, 11–5, 11–8 (1st PSA title)	(United States) Jack Elriani	(United States) Brendan Tagliarini (India) Tavneet Mundra	(Belgium) Maddox Moxham (Hong Kong) Jat Tse (Colombia) Nicolás Serna (United States) Quinlan Jeudy
US Challenger Series #1 (United States) Philadelphia, United States; Men: Challenger 3; 12 players - $3,000 −−−−−− Women: Challenger 3; 12 players - $3,000	28–31 August	(Egypt) Malak Taha; 12–10, 8–11, 14–12, 11–3 (2nd PSA title)	(United States) Charlotte Sze	(Belgium) Savannah Moxham (United States) Vivienne Sze	(Nigeria) Olatunji Busayo (United States) Riva Bhagwati (United States) Trinity Moshi (United States) Alysa Ali

=== September ===
Tournament	Date	Champion	Runner-Up	Semifinalists	Quarterfinalists
London Squash Classic (England) London, England; Men: World Events – Gold; 32 players – $144,000 −−−−−− Women: World Events – Gold; 32 players – $144,000	1–6 September	(New Zealand) Paul Coll; 11–6, 11–5, 11–3 (34th PSA title)	(France) Victor Crouin	(England) Marwan El Shorbagy (Malaysia) Eain Yow	(Egypt) Kareem El Torkey (Mexico) Leonel Cárdenas (Egypt) Youssef Soliman (England) Mohamed El Shorbagy
London Squash Classic (England) London, England; Men: World Events – Gold; 32 players – $144,000 −−−−−− Women: World Events – Gold; 32 players – $144,000	1–6 September	(Egypt) Amina Orfi; 11–6, 11–8, 11–2 (14th PSA title)	(England) Georgina Kennedy	(Egypt) Hania El Hammamy (Malaysia) Sivasangari Subramaniam	(United States) Amanda Sobhy (Japan) Satomi Watanabe (Belgium) Tinne Gilis (India) Anahat Singh
Independence Day Open (Uzbekistan) Tashkent, Uzbekistan; Men: Challenger 6; 32 players - $6,000	2–6 September	(Canada) Salah Eltorgman; 9–11, 11–8, 11–5, 11–8 (5th PSA title)	(Scotland) John Meehan	(Pakistan) Tayyab Aslam (Belgium) Joeri Hapers	(Egypt) Abdullah Hafez (Kuwait) Seif Wael (Wales) Ioan Sharpe (Japan) Shota Yasunari
KCC PSA Challenge Cup; Hong Kong, China; Men: Challenger 6; 32 players – $6,000 −−−−−− Women: Challenger 6; 32 players – $6,000	7–11 September	(Egypt) Seif Refaay; 11–1, 11–9, 11–8 (4th PSA title)	(Japan) Naoki Hayashi	(Hong Kong) Leo Chung (Hong Kong) Andes Ling	(Hong Kong) Lap Man Au (Hong Kong) Lam Shing Fung (Japan) Tomotaka Endo (Singapore) Jerome Aw
KCC PSA Challenge Cup; Hong Kong, China; Men: Challenger 6; 32 players – $6,000 −−−−−− Women: Challenger 6; 32 players – $6,000	7–11 September	(Hong Kong) Ena Kwong; 4–11, 10–12, 11–9, 11–8, 11–8 (3rd PSA title)	(Hong Kong) Heylie Fung	(Hong Kong) Armona Cheung (Hong Kong) Bobo Lam	(Hong Kong) Makaela Cassidy (Hong Kong) Wai Sze Wing (India) Anika Dubey (Canada) Gladys Ho
Maspeth Welding Steel Court Championship (United States) Maspeth, New York City, United States; Men: Challenger 18; 32 players – $18,000 −−−−−− Women: Challenger 18; 32 players – $18,000	9–13 September	(Egypt) Salman Khalil; 12–14, 11–4, 11–6, 11–1 (7th PSA title)	(Egypt) Adam Hawal	(England) Tom Walsh (Egypt) Omar Said	(United States) Dillon Huang (France) Brice Nicolas (Canada) David Baillargeon (Egypt) Kareem Badawi
Maspeth Welding Steel Court Championship (United States) Maspeth, New York City, United States; Men: Challenger 18; 32 players – $18,000 −−−−−− Women: Challenger 18; 32 players – $18,000	9–13 September	(Egypt) Nour Khafagy; 11–8, 9–11, 3–11, 12–10, 11–5 (4th PSA title)	(Ukraine) Alina Bushma	(United States) Caroline Fouts (Egypt) Amina El Rihany	(Egypt) Jana Swaify (Malaysia) Yasshmita Jadishkumar (Canada) Nicole Bunyan (Barbados) Margot Prow
Brewin Dolphin Excalibur Cup (England) Winchester, England; Men: Challenger 3; 32 players - $3,000	11–13 September	(England) Jared Carter; 11–9, 6–11, 11–4, 5–11, 11–5 (4th PSA title)	(England) Dylan Roberts	(England) Oliver Tate (Republic of Ireland) Oisin Logan	(England) Ronnie Hickling (England) Abdallah Eissa (England) Robert Downer (Wales) Evan Davies-Clarke
US Challenger Series #2 (United States) Philadelphia, United States; Men: Challenger 3; 16 players - $3,000 −−−−−− Women: Challenger 3; 12 players - $3,000	11–13 September	(United States) Yaseen Shalaby; 11–7, 15–13, 3–11, 7–11, 11–3 (2nd PSA title)	(United States) Hollis Robertson	(India) Tavneet Mundra (Brazil) Yuri Pollak	(Australia) Clay Canty (Pakistan) Ahsan Ayaz (United States) Christopher Gordon (Egypt) Mina Youssef
US Challenger Series #2 (United States) Philadelphia, United States; Men: Challenger 3; 16 players - $3,000 −−−−−− Women: Challenger 3; 12 players - $3,000	11–13 September	(Belgium) Savannah Moxham w/o (1st PSA title)	(United States) Diya Yadav	(United States) Chelsea Chen (Egypt) Malak Taha	(United States) Ishani Wadhwa (Malaysia) Heng Wai Wong (Sri Lanka) Yeheni Kuruppu (United States) Vivienne Sze
QTerminals Qatar Classic; Doha, Qatar; Men: World Events – Platinum; 32 players – $242,000 −−−−−− Women: World Events – Platinum; 32 players – $242,000	12–18 September	(Egypt) Mostafa Asal; 11–5, 11–6, 11–2 (30th PSA title)	(France) Victor Crouin	(Egypt) Karim Gawad (England) Marwan El Shorbagy	(France) Grégoire Marche (New Zealand) Paul Coll (Egypt) Aly Abou Eleinen (Egypt) Youssef Soliman
QTerminals Qatar Classic; Doha, Qatar; Men: World Events – Platinum; 32 players – $242,000 −−−−−− Women: World Events – Platinum; 32 players – $242,000	12–18 September	(Egypt) Amina Orfi; 7–11, 11–7, 11–8, 7–11, 12–10 (15th PSA title)	(Egypt) Hania El Hammamy	(Malaysia) Sivasangari Subramaniam (England) Jasmine Hutton	(Malaysia) Rachel Arnold (Egypt) Fayrouz Aboelkheir (Egypt) Nouran Gohar (Belgium) Tinne Gilis
NASH Cup (Canada) London, Canada; Men: World Events – Copper; 32 players – $33,750 −−−−−− Women: World Events – Copper; 32 players – $33,750	15–19 September	(Malaysia) Joachim Chuah; 11–6, 11–3, 7–11, 11–1 (6th PSA title)	(Canada) David Baillargeon	(Colombia) Ronald Palomino (France) Brice Nicolas	(Pakistan) Huzaifa Ibrahim (England) Bailey Malik (France) Toufik Mekhalfi (United States) Nicholas Spizzirri
NASH Cup (Canada) London, Canada; Men: World Events – Copper; 32 players – $33,750 −−−−−− Women: World Events – Copper; 32 players – $33,750	15–19 September	(Egypt) Rowan Elaraby; 9–11, 11–9, 11–3, 11–4 (8th PSA title)	(Malaysia) Yasshmita Jadishkumar	(Canada) Hollie Naughton (Canada) Zeina Zein	(Republic of Ireland) Hannah Craig (Egypt) Menna Hamed (Egypt) Haya Ali (France) Marie Stephan
PSA Aramis Club (Belgium) Nimy, Belgium; Men: Challenger 3; 32 players – $3,000	15–19 September	(Germany) Yannik Omlor; 11–8, 11–8, 11–1 (4th PSA title)	(Scotland) John Meehan	(Australia) David Turner (Belgium) Joeri Hapers	(India) Yash Fadte (Luxembourg) Amir Samimi (France) Titouan Isambard (France) Laouenan Loaëc
Jack Fairs Open (Canada) London, Canada; Men: Challenger 3; 16 players – $3,000	17–19 September	(Canada) Youssef Taha; 11–4, 11–9, 8–11, 11–6 (1st PSA title)	(Canada) Abbas Nawaz	(Canada) Youssef Sarhan (Canada) Kent Rawlins	(Canada) Connor Turk (Japan) Jason Sano (Canada) Emilio Carrillo (Canada) Gabriel Van Moorsel
Internazionali d'Italia (Italy) Riccione, Italy; Men: Challenger 9; 32 players - $9,000 −−−−−− Women: Challenger 9; 32 players - $9,000	22–26 September	(France) Benjamin Aubert; 11–7, 11–9, 11–6 (7th PSA title)	(New Zealand) Oliver Dunbar	(New Zealand) Elijah Thomas (Czech Republic) Jakub Solnický	(Netherlands) Rowan Damming (England) Noah Meredith (Hungary) Benedek Takács (England) Abdallah Eissa
Internazionali d'Italia (Italy) Riccione, Italy; Men: Challenger 9; 32 players - $9,000 −−−−−− Women: Challenger 9; 32 players - $9,000	22–26 September	(Malaysia) Yasshmita Jadishkumar; 14–12, 11–1, 11–4 (5th PSA title)	(Spain) Noa Romero	(New Zealand) Kaitlyn Watts (Italy) Cristina Tartarone	(Scotland) Lisa Aitken (England) Kiera Marshall (England) Alicia Mead (Netherlands) Tessa ter Sluis
Open Ville de Québec (Canada) Quebec City, Canada; Men: Challenger 9; 32 players - $9,000 −−−−−− Women: Challenger 6; 16 players - $6,000	22–26 September	(France) Macéo Lévy; 11–6, 11–5, 11–6 (5th PSA title)	(Egypt) Omar Azzam	(Australia) Joseph White (United States) Tad Carney	(Czech Republic) Viktor Byrtus (Canada) Karim Aguib (Egypt) Shady El Sherbiny (Canada) Connor Turk
Open Ville de Québec (Canada) Quebec City, Canada; Men: Challenger 9; 32 players - $9,000 −−−−−− Women: Challenger 6; 16 players - $6,000	22–26 September	(Republic of Ireland) Hannah Craig; 11–7, 9–11, 11–1, 11–8 (3rd PSA title)	(Hong Kong) Ena Kwong	(United States) Charlotte Sze (Canada) Niki Shemirani	(Canada) Nicole Bunyan (Nigeria) Abdulazeez Rofiat (United States) Vivienne Sze (France) Kara Lincou
Genesee Valley Club Open (United States) Rochester, United States; Women: Challenger 6; 16 players - $6,000	22–26 September	(Hong Kong) Helen Tang; 14–12, 8–11, 11–8, 11–6 (1st PSA title)	(United States) Lucie Stefanoni	(Malaysia) Thanusaa Uthrian (Croatia) Franka Vidović	(Australia) Alex Haydon (United States) Elisabeth Ross (Guatemala) Darlyn Sandoval (United States) Joyce Chan
Simply the Brest Open (France) Brest, France; Men: Challenger 15; 32 players – $15,000	23–27 September	(France) Amir Khaled-Jousselin; 11–6, 6–11, 11–13, 11–8, 18–16 (6th PSA title)	(Egypt) Mohamed Sharaf	(France) Toufik Mekhalfi (Egypt) Mohamed Gohar	(Israel) Daniel Poleshchuk (Wales) Owain Taylor (Egypt) Yassin Shohdy (England) Bailey Malik
Assore Tour Challenger 12 #1 (South Africa) Johannesburg, South Africa; Men: Challenger 12; 32 players – $12,000 −−−−−− Women: Challenger 9; 32 players – $9,000	23–27 September	(Egypt) Adham Roshdy; 11–5, 11–5, 13–11 (3rd PSA title)	(Egypt) Ahmed Sobhy	(Egypt) Seif Tamer (Egypt) Ibrahim Elkabbani	(Egypt) Seif Refaay (Egypt) Khaled Labib (Egypt) Seif Shenawy (Egypt) Ziad Ibrahim
Assore Tour Challenger 12 #1 (South Africa) Johannesburg, South Africa; Men: Challenger 12; 32 players – $12,000 −−−−−− Women: Challenger 9; 32 players – $9,000	23–27 September	(Egypt) Menna Walid; 12–10, 11–4, 7–11, 8–11, 11–8 (6th PSA title)	(Egypt) Sohayla Hazem	(Egypt) Malak Fathy (South Africa) Hayley Ward	(Egypt) Jana Safy (Egypt) Nour Megahed (South Africa) Jordin Phillips (South Africa) Keschia Scorgie
JSW 11th Sunil Verma Memorial (India) Vasind, India; Men: Challenger 9; 32 players – $9,000 −−−−−− Women: Challenger 3; 32 players – $3,000	26–30 September	(Malaysia) Siow Yee Xian; 11–5, 11–7, 11–6 (6th PSA title)	(India) Om Semwal	(Egypt) Marwan Assal (Egypt) Eiad Daoud	(Malaysia) N Moganasundharam (India) Rahul Baitha (Malaysia) Duncan Lee (Singapore) Jerome Aw
JSW 11th Sunil Verma Memorial (India) Vasind, India; Men: Challenger 9; 32 players – $9,000 −−−−−− Women: Challenger 3; 32 players – $3,000	26–30 September	(India) Akanksha Salunkhe; 11–6, 11–6, 11–4 (4th PSA title)	(India) Sanya Vats	(India) Tanishka Jain (India) Anika Dubey	(India) Unnati Tripathi (India) Aadya Budhia (India) Akanksha Gupta (India) Vasundhara Nangare
Charlottesville Open (United States) Charlottesville, United States; Men: World Events – Copper; 32 players - $38,750	29 Sep. – 3 Oct.	(United States) Timothy Brownell; 12–10, 16–14, 10–12, 11–7 (18th PSA title)	(Egypt) Omar Said	(England) Sam Todd (England) Tom Walsh	(England) Finnlay Withington (Egypt) Adam Hawal (Wales) Emyr Evans (Netherlands) Rowan Damming
CBSquash Tour - COB Expo (Brazil) São Paulo, Brazil; Women: World Events – Copper; 32 players - $43,000	29 Sep. – 3 Oct.	(Egypt) Hana Moataz; 11–8, 11–8, 8–11, 11–7 (7th PSA title)	(Egypt) Nada Abbas	(Ukraine) Alina Bushma (Egypt) Amina El Rihany	(Egypt) Farida Walid (Colombia) Lucía Bautista (Norway) Madeleine Hylland (South Africa) Hayley Ward
CBSquash Tour - COB Expo (Brazil) São Paulo, Brazil; Men: Challenger 18; 32 players – $18,000	29 Sep. – 3 Oct.	(Switzerland) David Bernet; 11–4, 11–5, 11–3 (4th PSA title)	(Brazil) Diego Gobbi	(England) Will Salter (Argentina) Jeremías Azaña	(Argentina) Segundo Portabales (Paraguay) Francesco Marcantonio (Guatemala) Alejandro Enríquez (Malaysia) Low Wa Sern
Champion Fiberglass Swedish Open (Sweden) Stockholm, Sweden; Men: World Events – Silver; 32 players – $109,000 −−−−−− Women: World Events – Silver; 32 players – $109,000	30 Sep. – 4 Oct.	(Egypt) Mohamed Zakaria; 11–6, 11–6, 8–11, 11–2 (9th PSA title)	(Wales) Joel Makin	(England) Marwan El Shorbagy (Mexico) Leonel Cárdenas	(Egypt) Yahya Elnawasany (Egypt) Mohamed Abouelghar (Jamaica) Declan James (France) Grégoire Marche
Champion Fiberglass Swedish Open (Sweden) Stockholm, Sweden; Men: World Events – Silver; 32 players – $109,000 −−−−−− Women: World Events – Silver; 32 players – $109,000	30 Sep. – 4 Oct.	(Egypt) Fayrouz Aboelkheir; 11–4, 11–5, 11–3 (8th PSA title)	(England) Georgina Kennedy	(United States) Amanda Sobhy (Belgium) Nele Gilis	(Egypt) Rowan Elaraby (England) Lucy Turmel (Egypt) Hana Ramadan (Egypt) Nadien Elhammamy

=== October ===
Tournament	Date	Champion	Runner-Up	Semifinalists	Quarterfinalists
The Hamilton Open (United States) Lancaster, United States; Women: Challenger 15; 32 players – $15,000	5–9 October	(Egypt) Menna Hamed; 11–7, 8–11, 11–4, 11–8 (10th PSA title)	(Norway) Madeleine Hylland	(United States) Lucie Stefanoni (Canada) Nicole Bunyan	(Spain) Noa Romero (United States) Caroline Fouts (Hong Kong) Ena Kwong (Australia) Madison Lyon
Albufeira PSA Cidade Europeia Desporto (Portugal) Albufeira, Portugal; Men: Challenger 3; 32 players – $3,000 −−−−−− Women: Challenger 3; 16 players – $3,000	7–11 October	(Republic of Ireland) Conor Moran; 11–5, 11–3, 6–11, 12–10 (2nd PSA title)	(England) Jared Carter	(Egypt) Taha ElShafei (England) Abdallah Eissa	(Switzerland) Fabian Seitz (France) Laouenan Loaëc (Poland) Jakub Pytlowany (Czech Republic) Vojtěch Martinovský
Albufeira PSA Cidade Europeia Desporto (Portugal) Albufeira, Portugal; Men: Challenger 3; 32 players – $3,000 −−−−−− Women: Challenger 3; 16 players – $3,000	7–11 October	(Scotland) Alison Thomson; 11–9, 11–6, 6–11, 11–7 (6th PSA title)	(Brazil) Laura Silva	(England) Olivia Owens (Malaysia) Chen Yu Jie	(Portugal) Catarina Nunes (Netherlands) Megan van Drongelen (France) Ana Munos (Portugal) Mariana Ventura
Astana Open (Kazakhstan) Astana, Kazakhstan; Men: Challenger 6; 32 players – $6,000	8–11 October	(Egypt) Eiad Daoud; 11–5, 11–6, 11–7 (1st PSA title)	(Pakistan) Tayyab Aslam	(Belgium) Joeri Hapers (France) Manuel Paquemar	(Germany) Finn Koch (France) Thomas André Garcia (Iran) Mohammad Changanian (Russia) Makar Esin
Western Province Open (South Africa) Rondebosch, South Africa; Men: Challenger 3; 32 players – $3,000	8–11 October	(South Africa) Damian Groenewald; 11–7, 9–11, 10–12, 13–11, 11–5 (7th PSA title)	(Netherlands) Sam Gerrits	(South Africa) Ruan Olivier (South Africa) Reuel Videler	(South Africa) Ethan Robinson (South Africa) Jean-Pierre Brits (South Africa) Brett McLachan (South Africa) John-Ross Malloch
US Challenger Series #3 (United States) Redwood City, United States; Men: Challenger 3; 16 players - $3,000 −−−−−− Women: Challenger 3; 12 players - $3,000	10–12 October	(United States) Brendan Tagliarini; 12–10, 11–9, 6–11, 7–11, 11–1 (1st PSA title)	(India) Aryaveer Dewan	(Chile) Matías Lacroix (United States) Jack Elriani	(Pakistan) Ahsan Ayaz (United States) Jacob Miller (United States) Corey Shen (United States) Abhiroop Reddy
US Challenger Series #3 (United States) Redwood City, United States; Men: Challenger 3; 16 players - $3,000 −−−−−− Women: Challenger 3; 12 players - $3,000	10–12 October	(Colombia) Catalina Peláez; 11–6, 11–7, 11–4 (2nd PSA title)	(United States) Trinity Moshi	(United States) Chelsea Chen (United States) Riva Bhagwati	(United States) Riya Navani (United States) Erika Manilla (Belgium) Savannah Moxham (United States) Vivienne Sze
QSF No.4 PSA Challenger (Qatar) Doha, Qatar; Men: Challenger 3; 16 players – $3,000	12–15 October	(Kuwait) Seif Wael; 11–6, 11–7, 11–4 (1st PSA title)	(Bahrain) Yusuf Thani	(Egypt) Abdelrahman Abdelkhalek (Kuwait) Bader Almaghrebi	(Kuwait) Jassim Al-Ghareeb (Qatar) Yousef Farag (Kuwait) Abdulrahman Almaghrebi (Qatar) Salem Al-Malki
CIB Egyptian Open (Egypt) Giza, Egypt; Men: World Events – Diamond; 64 players – $367,500 −−−−−− Women: World Events – Diamond; 64 players – $367,500	6–16 October	(Peru) Diego Elías; 5–11, 11–5, 11–6, 7–11, 11–6 (23rd PSA title)	(Egypt) Mostafa Asal	(New Zealand) Paul Coll (Egypt) Karim Gawad	(England) Marwan El Shorbagy (France) Victor Crouin (Egypt) Mohamed Zakaria (Wales) Joel Makin
CIB Egyptian Open (Egypt) Giza, Egypt; Men: World Events – Diamond; 64 players – $367,500 −−−−−− Women: World Events – Diamond; 64 players – $367,500	6–16 October	(Egypt) Amina Orfi; 11–4, 11–4, 11–3 (16th PSA title)	(Egypt) Hania El Hammamy	(Malaysia) Sivasangari Subramaniam (Egypt) Nouran Gohar	(Japan) Satomi Watanabe (Egypt) Fayrouz Aboelkheir (Egypt) Nour El Sherbini (England) Georgina Kennedy
Tennis & Racquet Club Boston Open (United States) Boston, United States; Women: Challenger 18; 32 players – $18,000	14–18 October	(Egypt) Jana Swaify; 4–11, 6–11, 11–6, 11–6, 11–4 (4th PSA title)	(United States) Caroline Fouts	(United States) Lucie Stefanoni (Hong Kong) Lee Ka Yi	(Barbados) Margot Prow (United States) Isabella Tang (Norway) Madeleine Hylland (Mexico) Sarahí López
La Classique de Gatineau (Canada) Gatineau, Canada; Men: Challenger 3; 16 players – $3,000	15–18 October	(Ukraine) Dmytro Shcherbakov; 11–7, 5–11, 11–5, 11–4 (1st PSA title)	(Canada) Kent Rawlins	(Canada) Mohammadreza Jafarzadeh (Egypt) Aly Ezzat	(Canada) Youssef Taha (Canada) Maximilien Godbout (Japan) Jason Sano (Canada) Emilio Carrillo
Silicon Valley Open (United States) Redwood City, United States; Men: World Events – Gold; 32 players – $143,500 −−−−−− Women: World Events – Gold; 32 players – $143,500	20–24 October	(Egypt) Mohamed Zakaria; 11–5, 11–8, 11–3 (10th PSA title)	(France) Victor Crouin	(Peru) Diego Elías (England) Mohamed El Shorbagy	(Egypt) Kareem El Torkey (Pakistan) Noor Zaman (France) Baptiste Masotti (Egypt) Yahya Elnawasany
Silicon Valley Open (United States) Redwood City, United States; Men: World Events – Gold; 32 players – $143,500 −−−−−− Women: World Events – Gold; 32 players – $143,500	20–24 October	(Malaysia) Sivasangari Subramaniam; 11–7, 11–6, 11–8 (18th PSA title)	(Egypt) Farida Mohamed	(United States) Marina Stefanoni (India) Anahat Singh	(Egypt) Salma Hany (United States) Olivia Weaver (Egypt) Sana Ibrahim (Malaysia) Rachel Arnold
Assore Joburg Open (South Africa) Johannesburg, South Africa; Men: Challenger 12; 32 players – $12,000 −−−−−− Women: Challenger 9; 32 players – $9,000	20–24 October	(Egypt) Ibrahim Elkabbani; 11–8, 11–6, 8–11, 11–9 (9th PSA title)	(South Africa) Dewald van Niekerk	(Egypt) Mohamed Gohar (Egypt) Mohamed Sharaf	(Egypt) Khaled Labib (Egypt) Seif Tamer (Egypt) Hazem Hossam (South Africa) Damian Groenewald
Assore Joburg Open (South Africa) Johannesburg, South Africa; Men: Challenger 12; 32 players – $12,000 −−−−−− Women: Challenger 9; 32 players – $9,000	20–24 October	(Egypt) Rouqaia Othman; 11–7, 7–11, 11–8, 11–7 (3rd PSA title)	(Egypt) Habiba Tharwat	(Egypt) Hana Aladdin (Zimbabwe) Polite Mubure	(Egypt) Nour Megahed (Egypt) Salma El-Alfy (South Africa) Helena Hudson (Egypt) Salma Othman
Mile High 360 Summitt (United States) Denver, United States; Men: Challenger 9; 32 players – $9,000 −−−−−− Women: Challenger 9; 16 players – $9,000	20–24 October	(Mexico) Alfredo Ávila; 11–7, 11–7, 9–11, 13–11 (24th PSA title)	(Egypt) Omar Said	(Egypt) Marwan Tamer (Mexico) César Salazar	(Egypt) Omar Elkattan (Canada) Connor Turk (Colombia) Juan Irisarri (Colombia) Alejandro Martínez
Mile High 360 Summitt (United States) Denver, United States; Men: Challenger 9; 32 players – $9,000 −−−−−− Women: Challenger 9; 16 players – $9,000	20–24 October	(Canada) Zeina Zein; 11–4, 9–11, 18–16, 11–4 (7th PSA title)	(Republic of Ireland) Hannah Craig	(France) Kara Lincou (Barbados) Meagan Best	(Spain) Noa Romero (United States) Laila Sedky (Australia) Alex Haydon (United States) Charlotte Sze
Venus ABC Open (Pakistan) Karachi, Pakistan; Men: World Events – Copper; 32 players – $41,000 −−−−−− Women: World Events – Copper; 32 players – $41,000	21–25 October	(Egypt) Karim El Hammamy; 11–6, 12–10, 11–3 (4th PSA title)	(England) Curtis Malik	(Egypt) Yassin Shohdy (Malaysia) Siow Yee Xian	(Netherlands) Rowan Damming (Canada) Salah Eltorgman (Pakistan) Asim Khan (Egypt) Ziad Ibrahim
Venus ABC Open (Pakistan) Karachi, Pakistan; Men: World Events – Copper; 32 players – $41,000 −−−−−− Women: World Events – Copper; 32 players – $41,000	21–25 October	(Egypt) Rowan Elaraby; 11–6, 11–8, 11–5 (9th PSA title)	(Egypt) Amina El Rihany	(Egypt) Nadine Shahin (Egypt) Habiba Rizk	(England) Lucy Turmel (Japan) Akari Midorikawa (South Africa) Hayley Ward (Hong Kong) Toby Tse
CCSA Chicago Open (United States) Lake Forest, United States; Men: Challenger 18; 32 players - $18,000	21–25 October	(Egypt) Salman Khalil; 11–8, 11–7, 10–12, 11–6 (8th PSA title)	(Argentina) Jeremías Azaña	(Guatemala) Josué Enríquez (Wales) Rhys Evans	(United States) Hollis Robertson (Colombia) Juan José Torres (Republic of Ireland) Conor Moran (Egypt) Kareem Badawi
4ème Open PSA de Couzeix/Limoges (France) Couzeix, France; Women: Challenger 15; 32 players – $15,000	21–25 October	(France) Lauren Baltayan; 11–3, 11–7, 5–11, 11–4 (7th PSA title)	(Republic of Ireland) Breanne Flynn	(New Zealand) Kaitlyn Watts (Scotland) Lisa Aitken	(England) Kiera Marshall (New Zealand) Ella Lash (Hong Kong) Cheng Nga Ching (France) Énora Villard
PSNS 3K Challenger (Malaysia) Seri Menanti, Malaysia; Men: Challenger 3; 32 players – $3,000 −−−−−− Women: Challenger 3; 32 players – $3,000	21–25 October	(Malaysia) N Moganasundharam; 11–8, 11–5, 11–9 (1st PSA title)	(Malaysia) Hafiz Abdul Harif	(France) Titouan Isambard (Philippines) Reymark Begornia	(Malaysia) Tay Jun Qian (Philippines) Jonathan Reyes (Malaysia) Nabil Azrol (Malaysia) Aqil Fariz
PSNS 3K Challenger (Malaysia) Seri Menanti, Malaysia; Men: Challenger 3; 32 players – $3,000 −−−−−− Women: Challenger 3; 32 players – $3,000	21–25 October	(Malaysia) Harleein Tan; 3–1^{rtd.} (3rd PSA title)	(Malaysia) Jinoreeka Ning	(Philippines) Jemyca Aribado (Malaysia) Whitney Wilson	(Singapore) Naisha Singh (Malaysia) Haneesha Veerakumar (Indonesia) Raifa Yattaqi (Malaysia) Dakshayani Thangaraja
Smart Centres Canada Cup; Toronto, Canada; Men : World Events – Silver; 32 players - $114,500	25–30 October	(Peru) Diego Elías; 11–2, 11–6, 11–5 (24th PSA title)	(Mexico) Leonel Cárdenas	(Switzerland) Dimitri Steinmann (England) Mohamed El Shorbagy	(Pakistan) Noor Zaman (Pakistan) Ashab Irfan (France) Melvil Scianimanico (Egypt) Adam Hawal
Canadian Women's Open (Canada) Toronto, Canada; Women: World Events – Silver; 32 players – $103,750	25–30 October	(Egypt) Fayrouz Aboelkheir; 11–4, 11–2, 4–11, 13–11 (9th PSA title)	(England) Georgina Kennedy	(Egypt) Nada Abbas (Belgium) Tinne Gilis	(Egypt) Farida Mohamed (Hong Kong) Chan Sin Yuk (England) Grace Gear (India) Anahat Singh
6ème Open International de Lagord (France) Lagord, France; Men: Challenger 12; 32 players – $12,000	27–31 October	(France) Amir Khaled-Jousselin; 9–11, 11–8, 12–10, 2–11, 11–7 (7th PSA title)	(France) Macéo Lévy	(France) Edwin Clain (France) Benjamin Aubert	(England) Ben Smith (France) Baptiste Bouin (Netherlands) Sebastiaan Hofman (Wales) Owain Taylor
Swiss Open Lukas Gadola Memorial (Switzerland) Uster, Switzerland; Men: Challenger 12; 32 players – $12,000 −−−−−− Women: Challenger 9; 32 players – $9,000	28 Oct. – 1 Nov.	(Wales) Emyr Evans; 11–4, 11–5, 14–12 (4th PSA title)	(Pakistan) Hamza Khan	(Republic of Ireland) Sam Buckley (Spain) Sergio García	(Switzerland) David Bernet (Japan) Tomotaka Endo (Hungary) Benedek Takács (New Zealand) Elijah Thomas
Swiss Open Lukas Gadola Memorial (Switzerland) Uster, Switzerland; Men: Challenger 12; 32 players – $12,000 −−−−−− Women: Challenger 9; 32 players – $9,000	28 Oct. – 1 Nov.	(Hong Kong) Heylie Fung; 12–10, 11–8, 12–10 (7th PSA title)	(Hong Kong) Helen Tang	(Hong Kong) Cheng Nga Ching (New Zealand) Kaitlyn Watts	(Italy) Cristina Tartarone (Egypt) Jana Safy (Germany) Maya Weishar (France) Léa Barbeau
North Coast Open (Australia) Korora, Australia; Men: Challenger 6; 32 players – $6,000 −−−−−− Women: Challenger 6; 32 players – $6,000	28 Oct. – 1 Nov.	(United States) Tad Carney; 8–11, 11–7, 11–2, 1–7 (2nd PSA title)	(Australia) Joseph White	(Malta) Kijan Sultana (Australia) Brendan MacDonald	(Australia) Thomas Scott (Hong Kong) Harley Lam (France) Titouan Isambard (Australia) Joshua Larkin
North Coast Open (Australia) Korora, Australia; Men: Challenger 6; 32 players – $6,000 −−−−−− Women: Challenger 6; 32 players – $6,000	28 Oct. – 1 Nov.	(Hong Kong) Ena Kwong; 8–11, 11–8, 11–9, 13–11 (4th PSA title)	(Hong Kong) Armona Cheung	(India) Akanksha Salunkhe (Malaysia) Whitney Wilson	(Hong Kong) Wai Sze Wing (New Zealand) Maiden-Lee Coe (Japan) Kurumi Takahashi (Malaysia) Harleein Tan
Czech Open (Czech Republic) Brno, Czech Republic; Men: World Events – Copper; 32 players – $35,000	29 Oct. – 2 Nov.	(India) Velavan Senthilkumar; 13–11, 11–5, 8–11, 11–7 (12th PSA title)	(Scotland) Greg Lobban	(France) Auguste Dussourd (France) Toufik Mekhalfi	(Hungary) Balázs Farkas (England) Perry Malik (Argentina) Jeremías Azaña (Argentina) Leandro Romiglio
Women: Challenger 9; 32 players – $9,000	29 Oct. – 2 Nov.	(England) Alicia Mead; 13–11, 11–6, 11–9 (5th PSA title)	(Egypt) Menna Walid	(England) Kiera Marshall (Netherlands) Tessa ter Sluis	(Colombia) Lucía Bautista (Wales) Lowri Roberts (New Zealand) Ella Lash (Czech Republic) Karolína Šrámková

=== November ===
Tournament	Date	Champion	Runner-Up	Semifinalists	Quarterfinalists
U.S. Open Squash Championships (United States) Philadelphia, United States; Men: World Events – Platinum; 32 players – $241,000 −−−−−− Women: World Events – Platinum; 32 players – $241,000	1–7 November	(New Zealand) Paul Coll; 8–11, 11–5, 11–6, 11–8 (35th PSA title)	(Peru) Diego Elías	(Egypt) Aly Abou Eleinen (Egypt) Mostafa Asal	(France) Victor Crouin (Egypt) Karim Gawad (England) Mohamed El Shorbagy (Wales) Joel Makin
U.S. Open Squash Championships (United States) Philadelphia, United States; Men: World Events – Platinum; 32 players – $241,000 −−−−−− Women: World Events – Platinum; 32 players – $241,000	1–7 November	(Egypt) Amina Orfi; 11–7, 11–3, 11–6 (17th PSA title)	(Egypt) Nouran Gohar	(Egypt) Hania El Hammamy (Egypt) Nour El Sherbini	(Egypt) Fayrouz Aboelkheir (Egypt) Sana Ibrahim (England) Georgina Kennedy (Malaysia) Sivasangari Subramaniam
NSW Open (Australia) Thornleigh, Australia; Men: Challenger 6; 32 players – $6,000 −−−−−− Women: Challenger 6; 32 players – $6,000	3–7 November	(United States) Tad Carney; 11–2, 11–5, 11–4 (3rd PSA title)	(Australia) Thomas Scott	(Hong Kong) Lap Man Au (Hong Kong) Leo Chung	(Australia) Benjamin Ratcliffe (Egypt) Eiad Daoud (Hong Kong) Harley Lam (Australia) Remi Young
NSW Open (Australia) Thornleigh, Australia; Men: Challenger 6; 32 players – $6,000 −−−−−− Women: Challenger 6; 32 players – $6,000	3–7 November	(Hong Kong) Ena Kwong; 11–9, 11–6, 11–6 (5th PSA title)	(Hong Kong) Armona Cheung	(Malaysia) Whitney Wilson (Australia) Erin Classen	(India) Akanksha Salunkhe (Australia) Remashree Muniandy (Belgium) Chloé Crabbé (Hong Kong) Wai Sze Wing
London Open (England) Camden, England; Men: Challenger 18; 32 players – $18,000 −−−−−− Women: Challenger 18; 32 players – $18,000	4–8 November	(France) Amir Khaled-Jousselin; 11–5, 11–7, 11–6 (8th PSA title)	(Malaysia) Ameeshenraj Chandaran	(England) Simon Herbert (Portugal) Rui Soares	(England) Heston Malik (England) Patrick Rooney (India) Velavan Senthilkumar (Argentina) Leandro Romiglio
London Open (England) Camden, England; Men: Challenger 18; 32 players – $18,000 −−−−−− Women: Challenger 18; 32 players – $18,000	4–8 November	(Egypt) Sohayla Hazem; 5–11, 11–9, 8–11, 11–7, 11–7 (5th PSA title)	(England) Saran Nghiem	(Egypt) Jana Swaify (New Zealand) Kaitlyn Watts	(England) Alicia Mead (Barbados) Margot Prow (England) Katie Malliff (Malaysia) Zoe Foo
Bern Squash Open (Switzerland) Kehrsatz, Switzerland; Men: Challenger 12; 32 players – $12,000 −−−−−− Women: Challenger 12; 32 players – $12,000	4–8 November	(Egypt) Ibrahim Elkabbani; 11–5, 11–8, 7–11, 11–9 (10th PSA title)	(Czech Republic) Marek Panáček	(Pakistan) Hamza Khan (France) Brice Nicolas	(Egypt) Shady El Sherbiny (Belgium) Joeri Hapers (Wales) Elliott Morris Devred (Malaysia) Bryan Lim
Bern Squash Open (Switzerland) Kehrsatz, Switzerland; Men: Challenger 12; 32 players – $12,000 −−−−−− Women: Challenger 12; 32 players – $12,000	4–8 November	(Egypt) Farida Walid; 11–7, 11–6, 8–11, 11–8 (6th PSA title)	(Egypt) Jana Safy	(England) Olivia Besant (Switzerland) Cindy Merlo	(Hong Kong) Heylie Fung (Switzerland) Ambre Allinckx (Hong Kong) Helen Tang (Hong Kong) Kirstie Wong
Open PSA Boulat (France) Saint-Étienne, France; Men: Challenger 3; 32 players – $3,000	6–8 November	(France) Benjamin Aubert; 13–11, 10–12, 11–3, 11–5 (8th PSA title)	(Spain) Oriol Salvià	(India) Yash Fadte (Egypt) Sohail El Shenawy	(France) Noa Yulzari (France) Laouenan Loaëc (Spain) Pascal Gómez (France) Axel Daujon
Richardson Wealth Vancouver PSA Open (Canada) Vancouver, Canada; Men: World Events – Copper; 32 players – $33,750	5–9 November	(France) Melvil Scianimanico; 12–14, 11–4, 12–10, 11–3 (4th PSA title)	(Egypt) Adam Hawal	(Egypt) Salman Khalil (England) Finnlay Withington	(Argentina) Jeremías Azaña (England) Tom Walsh (Mexico) César Salazar (Wales) Rhys Evans
SACC Costa Rica Open; Pozos, Costa Rica; Men: Challenger 18; 32 players – $18,000 −−−−−− Women: Challenger 18; 32 players – $18,000	10–14 November	(Egypt) Mohamed Sharaf; 11–7, 7–11, 7–11, 11–5, 12–10 (7th PSA title)	(Egypt) Mohamed Gohar	(Paraguay) Francesco Marcantonio (Colombia) Andrés Herrera	(Mexico) Sebastián Salazar (Mexico) Alfredo Ávila (Mexico) Alejandro Reyes (Guatemala) Josué Enríquez
SACC Costa Rica Open; Pozos, Costa Rica; Men: Challenger 18; 32 players – $18,000 −−−−−− Women: Challenger 18; 32 players – $18,000	10–14 November	(Colombia) Lucía Bautista; 11–7, 8–11, 5–11, 11–8, 11–7 (3rd PSA title)	(Egypt) Amina El Rihany	(South Africa) Hayley Ward (United States) Lucie Stefanoni	(Canada) Zeina Zein (Norway) Madeleine Hylland (United States) Charlotte Sze (Egypt) Malak Taha
Pittsburgh Open (United States) Pittsburgh, United States; Men: World Events – Silver; 32 players - $96,000	11–15 November	(Wales) Joel Makin; 8–11, 9–11, 12–10, 11–5, 11–7 (11th PSA title)	(England) Marwan El Shorbagy	(England) Finnlay Withington (Mexico) Leonel Cárdenas	(Mexico) Juan Vargas (United States) Timothy Brownell (Egypt) Adam Hawal (Slovenia) Mohamed ElSherbini
UTU Singapore Classic; Kallang, Singapore; Men: Challenger 15; 32 players – $15,000 −−−−−− Women: Challenger 15; 32 players – $15,000	11–15 November	(Malaysia) Sanjay Jeeva; 10–12, 12–10, 11–3, 12–10 (3rd PSA title)	(Hong Kong) Alex Lau	(Malaysia) Siow Yee Xian (Japan) Naoki Hayashi	(Malaysia) Syafiq Kamal (Malaysia) Duncan Lee (Egypt) Abdullah Hafez (India) Suraj Chand
UTU Singapore Classic; Kallang, Singapore; Men: Challenger 15; 32 players – $15,000 −−−−−− Women: Challenger 15; 32 players – $15,000	11–15 November	(Egypt) Malika Elkaraksy; 11–9, 14–12, 4–11, 13–11 (1st PSA title)	(Malaysia) Ainaa Amani	(Egypt) Nadine Shahin (Japan) Akari Midorikawa	(Malaysia) Zoe Foo (New Zealand) Ella Lash (Malaysia) Harleein Tan (Republic of Ireland) Breanne Flynn
Lausanne Open (Switzerland) Renens, Switzerland; Men: Challenger 12; 32 players – $12,000 −−−−−− Women: Challenger 12; 32 players - $12,000	11–15 November	(France) Baptiste Bouin; 6–11, 11–6, 16–14, 11–6 (2nd PSA title)	(Portugal) Rui Soares	(England) Heston Malik (France) Matteo Carrouget	(Scotland) Alasdair Prott (Netherlands) Sam Gerrits (Malaysia) Bryan Lim (Germany) Yannik Omlor
Lausanne Open (Switzerland) Renens, Switzerland; Men: Challenger 12; 32 players – $12,000 −−−−−− Women: Challenger 12; 32 players - $12,000	11–15 November	(England) Saran Nghiem; 4–11, 11–9, 11–6, 8–11, 11–8 (6th PSA title)	(Egypt) Menna Hamed	(England) Grace Gear (Poland) Karina Tyma	(Egypt) Nour Megahed (Switzerland) Ambre Allinckx (New Zealand) Jena Gregory (France) Ana Munos
ARDEX Open (Germany) Germering, Germany; Men: Challenger 12; 32 players – $12,000 −−−−−− Women: Challenger 6; 32 players - $6,000	11–15 November	(Republic of Ireland) Sam Buckley; 12–10, 11–8, 11–13, 6–11, 11–9 (3rd PSA title)	(Israel) Daniel Poleshchuk	(Egypt) Shady El Sherbiny (Czech Republic) Jakub Solnický	(France) Joshua Phinéra (England) Jared Carter (Republic of Ireland) Conor Moran (England) Noah Meredith
ARDEX Open (Germany) Germering, Germany; Men: Challenger 12; 32 players – $12,000 −−−−−− Women: Challenger 6; 32 players - $6,000	11–15 November	(Germany) Katerina Tycova; 11–6, 11–9, 7–11, 11–9 (2nd PSA title)	(Czech Republic) Karolína Šrámková	(Scotland) Robyn McAlpine (Wales) Lowri Roberts	(Germany) Maya Weishar (Scotland) Alison Thomson (Germany) Saskia Beinhard (New Zealand) Emma Merson
Kelowna Open (Canada) Kelowna, Canada; Men: Challenger 9; 32 players - $9,000	11–15 November	(Canada) David Baillargeon; 11–2, 11–6, 11–3 (8th PSA title)	(New Zealand) Elijah Thomas	(United States) Tad Carney (Wales) Ioan Sharpe	(Egypt) Omar Elkeiy (Canada) Cameron Seth (Canada) Connor Turk (Canada) Mohammadreza Jafarzadeh
US Challenger Series #4 (United States) Washington, D.C., United States; Men: Challenger 3; 16 players - $3,000 −−−−−− Women: Challenger 3; 16 players - $3,000	13–15 November	(United States) Yaseen Shalaby; 12–10, 11–2, 11–7 (3rd PSA title)	(Brazil) Yuri Pollak	(Egypt) Omar Zakaria (United States) Quinlan Jeudy	(United States) Brendan Tagliarini (United States) Lars Gertsen (Pakistan) Sami Ullah (United States) Mohamed Nawar
US Challenger Series #4 (United States) Washington, D.C., United States; Men: Challenger 3; 16 players - $3,000 −−−−−− Women: Challenger 3; 16 players - $3,000	13–15 November	(Barbados) Meagan Best; 11–8, 11–4, 11–3 (1st PSA title)	(Belgium) Savannah Moxham	(United States) Reghan McLaughlin (United States) Chelsea Chen	(United States) Elisabeth Ross (United States) Akaisha Bhatia (United States) Layla Gupta (United States) Vivienne Sze
QSF No.3 PSA Copper (Qatar) Doha, Qatar; Men: World Events – Copper; 32 players – $40,500	15–19 November	(India) Velavan Senthilkumar; 5–11, 11–8, 7–11, 12–10, 11–9 (13th PSA title)	(Switzerland) Dimitri Steinmann	(Malaysia) Ameeshenraj Chandaran (South Africa) Dewald van Niekerk	(Egypt) Seif Tamer (Egypt) Omar Said (Qatar) Abdulla Al-Tamimi (Egypt) Ziad Ibrahim
Hong Kong PSA Challenge Cup; Hong Kong, China; Men: Challenger 12; 32 players - $12,000 −−−−−− Women: Challenger 12; 32 players - $12,000	16–20 November	(France) Edwin Clain; 11–13, 11–9, 11–7, 11–5 (5th PSA title)	(Egypt) Abdullah Hafez	(Canada) Salah Eltorgman (Canada) Karim Aguib	(Hong Kong) Matthew Lai (Malaysia) Duncan Lee (Germany) Jan Wipperfürth (Hong Kong) Leo Chung
Hong Kong PSA Challenge Cup; Hong Kong, China; Men: Challenger 12; 32 players - $12,000 −−−−−− Women: Challenger 12; 32 players - $12,000	16–20 November	(Hong Kong) Heylie Fung; 11–5, 11–6, 5–11, 12–10 (8th PSA title)	(Hong Kong) Toby Tse	(Hong Kong) Helen Tang (Hong Kong) Kirstie Wong	(Republic of Ireland) Breanne Flynn (Egypt) Nadine Shahin (Egypt) Malak Fathy (Hong Kong) Cheng Nga Ching
Open International Niort-Venise Verte (France) Bessines, France; Men: Challenger 15; 32 players – $15,000	17–21 November	(France) Amir Khaled-Jousselin; 11–3, 11–9, 11–5 (9th PSA title)	(Czech Republic) Jakub Solnický	(Scotland) Alasdair Prott (England) Ben Smith	(Republic of Ireland) Sam Buckley (Czech Republic) Viktor Byrtus (France) Macéo Lévy (Israel) Daniel Poleshchuk
Istanbul Squash Open (Turkey) Istanbul, Turkey; Men: Challenger 12; 32 players – $12,000	17–21 November	(Egypt) Yassin ElShafei; 11–6, 4–11, 11–8, 7–11, 11–8 (10th PSA title)	(Egypt) Omar Azzam	(England) Jared Carter (Australia) Brendan MacDonald	(Hungary) Benedek Takács (Egypt) Khaled Labib (Malaysia) Bryan Lim (Egypt) Omar Elkattan
China Squash Open; Shanghai, China; Men: World Events – Gold; 32 players – $139,500 −−−−−− Women: World Events – Gold; 32 players – $139,500	17–22 November	(Egypt) Mostafa Asal; 13–11, 10–12, 11–9, 13–11 (31st PSA title)	(Egypt) Mohamed Zakaria	(Egypt) Youssef Ibrahim (England) Simon Herbert	(France) Baptiste Masotti (Malaysia) Eain Yow (Scotland) Greg Lobban (Japan) Ryūnosuke Tsukue
China Squash Open; Shanghai, China; Men: World Events – Gold; 32 players – $139,500 −−−−−− Women: World Events – Gold; 32 players – $139,500	17–22 November	(Malaysia) Sivasangari Subramaniam w/o (19th PSA title)	(Japan) Satomi Watanabe	(United States) Marina Stefanoni (Hong Kong) Chan Sin Yuk	(Egypt) Sana Ibrahim (Egypt) Nada Abbas (Egypt) Salma Hany (Egypt) Farida Mohamed
Northwestern Ontario Open (Canada) Thunder Bay, Canada; Men: Challenger 3; 32 players – $3,000	18–22 November	(Nigeria) Shuaib Giwa; 11–4, 11–8, 11–9 (1st PSA title)	(Nigeria) Yusuf Quadri	(Canada) Maximilien Godbout (United States) Bransten Ming	(Bermuda) Taylor Carrick (Canada) Madison Eggert (Canada) Nick Persichino (Canada) Sean Cameron
Clarence Open (Australia) Hobart, Australia; Men: Challenger 3; 32 players – $3,000	19–22 November	(Malaysia) Altamis Sallam; 7–11, 13–11, 11–3, 11–8 (1st PSA title)	(Malaysia) Kreethi Pillay	(Australia) James Lloyd (Pakistan) Sakhiullah Tareen	(Australia) Jack Hudson (Australia) Lachlan Coxsedge (Australia) Kasper Cheung (Hong Kong) Andes Ling
Monte Carlo Classic (Monaco) Fontvieille, Monaco; Women: World Events – Copper; 32 players – $41,500	23–27 November				
HKFC Milwaukee Open; Hong Kong, China; Men: World Events – Silver; 32 players – $96,500 −−−−−− Women: World Events – Silver; 32 players – $96,500	24–28 November				
CAS International Squash Championship (Pakistan) Islamabad, Pakistan; Men: World Events – Copper; 32 players – $40,000	24–28 November				
BDO Namibian Open (Namibia) Windhoek, Namibia; Men: Challenger 15; 32 players – $15,000	24–28 November				
Arrayanes Country Club Open (Ecuador) Puembo, Ecuador; Men: Challenger 9; 32 players - $9,000 −−−−−− Women: Challenger 9; 32 players – $9,000	24–28 November				
Les Elles de l'Est Challenger (France) Maxéville, France; Women: Challenger 6; 32 players – $6,000	24–28 November				
University of Victoria Open (Canada) Victoria, Canada; Men: Challenger 3; 32 players – $3,000 ------ Women: Challenger 3; 16 players – $3,000	25–29 November				
Lachwil Cambridge Open (Australia) Wembley, Australia; Men: Challenger 3; 32 players – $3,000	26–29 November				

== Statistical information ==
The players/nations are sorted by:

1. Total number of titles;
2. Cumulated importance of those titles;
3. Alphabetical order (by family names for players).

=== Key ===
World Championship/PSA Finals
World Events Diamond
World Events Platinum
World Events Gold
World Events Silver
World Events Bronze
World Events Copper
Challenger Events 3/6/9/12/15

=== Titles won by player (men's) ===
Total	Player	World Ch. / PSA Finals	Diamond	Platinum	Gold	Silver	Bronze	Copper	Challenger 18	Challenger 15	Challenger 12	Challenger 9	Challenger 6	Challenger 3
4	Amir Khaled-Jousselin (FRA)								●	●●	●			
3	Velavan Senthilkumar (IND)							●●●						
3	Salman Khalil (EGY)							●	●●					
3	Yaseen Shalaby (USA)													●●●
2	Diego Elías (PER)		●			●								
2	Mostafa Asal (EGY)			●	●									
2	Paul Coll (NZL)			●	●									
2	Mohamed Zakaria (EGY)				●	●								
2	Ibrahim Elkabbani (EGY)										●●			
2	Adham Roshdy (EGY)										●		●	
2	Seif Refaay (EGY)											●	●	
2	Benjamin Aubert (FRA)											●		●
2	Tad Carney (USA)												●●	
2	Omar Helmy (EGY)													●●
1	Joel Makin (WAL)					●								
1	Timothy Brownell (USA)							●						
1	Joachim Chuah (MYS)							●						
1	Karim El Hammamy (EGY)							●						
1	Melvil Scianimanico (FRA)							●						
1	David Bernet (SUI)								●					
1	Mohamed Sharaf (EGY)								●					
1	Sanjay Jeeva (MYS)									●				
1	Abhay Singh (IND)									●				
1	Baptiste Bouin (FRA)										●			
1	Sam Buckley (IRE)										●			
1	Edwin Clain (FRA)										●			
1	Yassin ElShafei (EGY)										●			
1	Emyr Evans (WAL)										●			
1	Alfredo Ávila (MEX)											●		
1	David Baillargeon (CAN)											●		
1	Macéo Lévy (FRA)											●		
1	Siow Yee Xian (MYS)											●		
1	Onaopemipo Adegoke (NGR)												●	
1	Kareem Badawi (EGY)												●	
1	Eiad Daoud (EGY)												●	
1	Salah Eltorgman (CAN)												●	
1	Nasir Iqbal (PAK)												●	
1	Owain Taylor (WAL)												●	
1	Jared Carter (ENG)													●
1	Shuaib Giwa (NGR)													●
1	Damian Groenewald (RSA)													●
1	Ahmad Haq (USA)													●
1	Huzaifa Ibrahim (PAK)													●
1	Na Joo-young (KOR)													●
1	Nickhileswar Moganasundharam (MYS)													●
1	Conor Moran (IRE)													●
1	Mohammed Nasfan (KSA)													●
1	Yannik Omlor (GER)													●
1	Altamis Sallam (MYS)													●
1	Dmytro Shcherbakov (UKR)													●
1	Brendan Tagliarini (USA)													●
1	Youssef Taha (CAN)													●
1	Seif Wael (KUW)													●

=== Titles won by nation (men's) ===
Total	Nation	World Ch. / PSA Finals	Diamond	Platinum	Gold	Silver	Bronze	Copper	Challenger 18	Challenger 15	Challenger 12	Challenger 9	Challenger 6	Challenger 3
20	Egypt (EGY)			●	●●	●		●●	●●●		●●●●	●	●●●●	●●
10	France (FRA)							●	●	●●	●●●	●●		●
8	United States (USA)							●					●●	●●●●●
5	Malaysia (MYS)							●		●		●		●●
4	India (IND)							●●●		●				
3	Wales (WAL)					●					●		●	
3	Canada (CAN)											●	●	●
2	Peru (PER)		●			●								
2	New Zealand (NZL)			●	●									
2	Ireland (IRE)										●			●
2	Nigeria (NGR)												●	●
2	Pakistan (PAK)												●	●
1	Switzerland (SUI)								●					
1	Mexico (MEX)											●		
1	England (ENG)													●
1	Germany (GER)													●
1	Kuwait (KUW)													●
1	Saudi Arabia (KSA)													●
1	South Africa (RSA)													●
1	South Korea (KOR)													●
1	Ukraine (UKR)													●

=== Titles won by player (women's) ===
Total	Player	World Ch. / PSA Finals	Diamond	Platinum	Gold	Silver	Bronze	Copper	Challenger 18	Challenger 15	Challenger 12	Challenger 9	Challenger 6	Challenger 3
4	Amina Orfi (EGY)		●	●●	●									
3	Sohayla Hazem (EGY)								●	●		●		
3	Ena Kwong (HKG)												●●●	
2	Sivasangari Subramaniam (MYS)				●●									
2	Fayrouz Aboelkheir (EGY)					●●								
2	Rowan Elaraby (EGY)							●●						
2	Heylie Fung (HKG)										●	●		
2	Harleein Tan (MYS)											●		●
1	Hana Moataz (EGY)							●						
1	Lucía Bautista (COL)								●					
1	Nour Khafagy (EGY)								●					
1	Jana Swaify (EGY)								●					
1	Lauren Baltayan (FRA)									●				
1	Malika Elkaraksy (EGY)									●				
1	Menna Hamed (EGY)									●				
1	Saran Nghiem (ENG)										●			
1	Farida Walid (EGY)										●			
1	Yasshmita Jadishkumar (MYS)											●		
1	Alicia Mead (ENG)											●		
1	Rouqaia Othman (EGY)											●		
1	Menna Walid (EGY)											●		
1	Zeina Zein (CAN)											●		
1	Hannah Craig (IRE)												●	
1	Amira Elrefaey (EGY)												●	
1	Heo Min-gyeong (KOR)												●	
1	Helen Tang (HKG)												●	
1	Katerina Tycova (GER)												●	
1	Sana Bahadar (PAK)													●
1	Meagan Best (BAR)													●
1	Sarah Cardwell (AUS)													●
1	Savannah Moxham (BEL)													●
1	Catalina Peláez (COL)													●
1	Akanksha Salunkhe (IND)													●
1	Malak Taha (EGY)													●
1	Alison Thomson (SCO)													●

=== Titles won by nation (women's) ===
Total	Nation	World Ch. / PSA Finals	Diamond	Platinum	Gold	Silver	Bronze	Copper	Challenger 18	Challenger 15	Challenger 12	Challenger 9	Challenger 6	Challenger 3
21	Egypt (EGY)		●	●●	●	●●		●●●	●●●	●●●	●	●●●	●	●
6	Hong Kong (HKG)										●	●	●●●●	
5	Malaysia (MYS)				●●							●●		●
2	Colombia (COL)								●					●
2	England (ENG)										●	●		
1	France (FRA)									●				
1	Canada (CAN)											●		
1	Germany (GER)												●	
1	Ireland (IRE)												●	
1	South Korea (KOR)												●	
1	Australia (AUS)													●
1	Barbados (BAR)													●
1	Belgium (BEL)													●
1	India (IND)													●
1	Pakistan (PAK)													●
1	Scotland (SCO)													●

== Retirements ==
Following is a list of notable players (winners of a main tour title, and/or part of the PSA Men's World Rankings and Women's World Rankings top 30 for at least one month) who announced their retirement from professional squash, became inactive, or were permanently banned from playing, during the 2025–27 season:

== Current world top 10 players ==
=== Men's world ranking ===
PSA Men's World Rankings as of 1 September 2025
Rank	Player	Points	Move^{†}
1	Mostafa Asal (EGY)	2,338	Steady
2	Diego Elías (PER)	1,631	Steady
3	Paul Coll (NZL)	1,153	Steady
4	Joel Makin (WAL)	1,096	Steady
5	Marwan Elshorbagy (ENG)	847	Steady
6	Karim Gawad (EGY)	811	Steady
7	Mohamed Elshorbagy (ENG)	794	Steady
8	Youssef Soliman (EGY)	616	Steady
9	Aly Abou Eleinen (EGY)	580	Steady
10	Youssef Ibrahim (EGY)	578	Steady

=== Women's world ranking ===
PSA Women's World Rankings, of the 5 January 2026
Rank	Player	Average	Move^{†}
1	Hania El Hammamy (EGY)	1,791	Steady
2	Nouran Gohar (EGY)	1,578	Steady
3	Amina Orfi (EGY)	1,455	Steady
4	Nour El Sherbini (EGY)	1,324	Steady
5	Olivia Weaver (USA)	1,284	Steady
6	Satomi Watanabe (JPN)	881	Steady
7	Sivasangari Subramaniam (MAS)	869	Steady
8	Tinne Gilis (BEL)	755	Steady
9	Fayrouz Aboelkheir (EGY)	753	Steady
10	Georgina Kennedy (ENG)	741	Steady

== See also ==
- 2026–27 PSA World Events Finals
- 2027 Men's PSA World Events Finals
- 2027 Women's PSA World Events Finals
- 2026 in squash
- 2027 in squash
