= 2023–24 PSA World Championships Qualifiers =

Squash qualifiers for the 2023–24 PSA World Championship

2023–24 PSA World Tour

Details
- Event name: PSA World Championships Qualifiers
- Location: Various
- Venue: Various
- Dates: April 4–21, 2024
- Website; PSA World Championships Qualifiers
- Year: 2023–24 PSA World Tour

2023–24 PSA World Championship Qualifiers will determine the five qualifiers (five men's and five women's) for the 2023–24 PSA World Championship to be held in Cairo, Egypt on May 9–18.

The qualifiers comprise five qualifying tournaments (Africa, Americas, Asia, Europea and Oceania) with every tournament granting prize money and ranking points.

Every qualifier draw is made up of 16 men's and 16 women's with the winners receiving a spot for the 2023–24 PSA World Championship. If the winner is already qualified via-PSA World ranking, the spot will be given to runner-up.

== Summary ==
| Zonal | Dates | Venue(s) | Berth(s) | Qualified |
|---|---|---|---|---|
| Oceania | 4–7 April | Carrara Squash Centre; Carrara, Australia | 2 | (Australia) Joseph White (Australia) Alex Haydon |
| Europe | 10–13 April | La Maison du Squash; Sautron, France | 2 | (Czech Republic) Martin Švec (Spain) Marta Domínguez |
| Africa | 13–16 April | Black Ball Sporting Club; New Cairo, Egypt | 2 | (Egypt) Moustafa El Sirty (Egypt) Nardine Garas |
| Asia | 18–21 April | Seremban 2 Squash Complex; Seremban, Malaysia | 2 | (Japan) Ryūnosuke Tsukue (Malaysia) Chan Yiwen |
| Pan-America | 18–21 April | Play Squash Academy; Columbia, United States | 2 | (United States) Spencer Lovejoy (United States) Caroline Fouts |
| Total | | | 10 | |

== Qualified players ==
=== Men's ===
1. (Australia) Joseph White
2. (Czech Republic) Martin Švec
3. (Egypt) Moustafa El Sirty
4. (Japan) Ryūnosuke Tsukue
5. (United States) Spencer Lovejoy

=== Women's ===
1. (Australia) Alex Haydon
2. (Spain) Marta Domínguez
3. (Egypt) Nardine Garas
4. (Malaysia) Chan Yiwen
5. (United States) Caroline Fouts

== Oceania ==
To be held at Carrara Squash Centre, Carrara, Australia on April 4–7.

=== Men's ===
Round 1 (4 April)
1 | (Australia) Joseph White | 11 | 11 | 11
(Australia) Brendan MacDonald | 8 | 4 | 7
(Australia) David Turner | 8 | 8 | 9
8 | (Australia) Tate Norris | 11 | 11 | 11
5 | (Australia) Nicholas Calvert | 5 | 11 | 11 | 11
(New Zealand) Mason Smales | 11 | 9 | 1 | 7
(Australia) Javed Ali | 4 | 3 | 5
3 | (New Zealand) Elijah Thomas | 11 | 11 | 11
4 | (New Zealand) Anthony Lepper | 12 | 11 | 7 | 9 | 11
(Australia) Benjamin Ratcliffe | 10 | 5 | 11 | 11 | 5
(Papua New Guinea) Feanor Siaguru | 3 | 3 | 4
6 | (Australia) Rhys Dowling | 11 | 11 | 11
7 | (Australia) Dylan Molinaro | 11 | 11 | 11
(Australia) Remi Young | 5 | 5 | 7
(Australia) Bradley Fullick | 8 | 6 | 12 | 6
2 | (New Zealand) Temwa Chileshe | 11 | 11 | 10 | 11

Quarter-finals (5 April)
1 | (Australia) Joseph White | 11 | 11 | 11
8 | (Australia) Tate Norris | 5 | 4 | 1
5 | (Australia) Nicholas Calvert | 11 | 11 | 11
3 | (New Zealand) Elijah Thomas | 7 | 8 | 4
4 | (New Zealand) Anthony Lepper | 3 | 8 | 6
6 | (Australia) Rhys Dowling | 11 | 11 | 11
7 | (Australia) Dylan Molinaro | 11 | 5 | 9 | 2
2 | (New Zealand) Temwa Chileshe | 8 | 11 | 11 | 11

Semifinals (6 April)
1 | (Australia) Joseph White | 11 | 11 | 11
5 | (Australia) Nicholas Calvert | 3 | 6 | 6
6 | (Australia) Rhys Dowling | 12 | 11 | 4 | 9 | 11
2 | (New Zealand) Temwa Chileshe | 10 | 8 | 11 | 11 | 5

Final (7 April)
1 | (Australia) Joseph White | 11 | 11 | 6 | 11
6 | (Australia) Rhys Dowling | 8 | 8 | 11 | 6

Times are Australian Eastern Standard Time (UTC+10:00). To the best of five games.

Matches

| Date | Round | Time | Player 1 | Player 2 | Score |
|---|---|---|---|---|---|
| 4 April | Round 1 | 15:45 | Joseph White (AUS) | Brendan MacDonald (AUS) | 11–8, 11-4, 11–7 |
| 4 April | Round 1 | 15:45 | David Turner (AUS) | Tate Norris (AUS) | 11–8, 11–8, 11–9 |
| 4 April | Round 1 | 17:15 | Nicholas Calvert (AUS) | Mason Smales (NZL) | 5–11, 11–9, 11–1, 11–7 |
| 4 April | Round 1 | 17:15 | Javed Ali (AUS) | Elijah Thomas (NZL) | 11–4, 11–3, 11–5 |
| 4 April | Round 1 | 18:45 | Anthony Lepper (NZL) | Benjamin Ratcliffe (AUS) | 12–10, 11–5, 7–11, 9–11, 11–5 |
| 4 April | Round 1 | 18:45 | Feanor Siaguru (PNG) | Rhys Dowling (AUS) | 11–3, 11–3, 11–4 |
| 4 April | Round 1 | 20:15 | Dylan Molinaro (AUS) | Remi Young (AUS) | 11–5, 11–5, 11–7 |
| 4 April | Round 1 | 20:15 | Bradley Fullick (AUS) | Temwa Chileshe (NZL) | 11–8, 11–6, 10–12, 11–6 |
| 5 April | Quarterfinals | 17:45 | Joseph White (AUS) | Tate Norris (AUS) | 11–5, 11–4, 11–1 |
| 5 April | Quarterfinals | 17:45 | Nicholas Calvert (AUS) | Elijah Thomas (NZL) | 11–7, 11–8, 11–4 |
| 5 April | Quarterfinals | 19:15 | Anthony Lepper (NZL) | Rhys Dowling (AUS) | 11–3, 11–8, 11–6 |
| 5 April | Quarterfinals | 19:15 | Dylan Molinaro (AUS) | Temwa Chileshe (NZL) | 8–11, 11–5, 11–9, 11–2 |
| 6 April | Semifinals | 16:45 | Joseph White (AUS) | Nicholas Calvert (AUS) | 11–3, 11–6, 11–6 |
| 6 April | Semifinals | 18:15 | Rhys Dowling (AUS) | Temwa Chileshe (NZL) | 12–10, 11–8, 4–11, 9–11, 11–5 |
| 7 April | Final | 15:00 | Joseph White (AUS) | Rhys Dowling (AUS) | 11–8, 11–8, 6–11, 11–6 |

=== Women's ===
Round 1 (4 April)
bye
(Australia) Amelie Guziak | 11 | 6 | 5 | 11 | 7
7 | (Australia) Remashree Muniandy | 9 | 11 | 11 | 3 | 11
5 | (New Zealand) Ella Lash | 11 | 11 | 11
(Australia) Sarbani Maitra | 3 | 5 | 6
bye
bye
(Papua New Guinea) Amity Alarcos | 4 | 2 | 2
8 | (Australia) Lee Sze Yu | 11 | 11 | 11
6 | (Australia) Madison Lyon | 11 | 11 | 11
(Australia) Shona Coxsedge | 5 | 7 | 9
bye

Quarter-finals (5 April)
1 | (Australia) Alex Haydon | 11 | 11 | 11
7 | (Australia) Remashree Muniandy | 4 | 2 | 5
5 | (New Zealand) Ella Lash | 11 | 11 | 11
3 | (Australia) Rachael Grinham | 8 | 8 | 7
4 | (Australia) Erin Classen | 9 | 11 | 11 | 11
8 | (Australia) Lee Sze Yu | 11 | 5 | 2 | 8
6 | (Australia) Madison Lyon | 8 | 9 | 8
2 | (Australia) Sarah Cardwell | 11 | 11 | 11

Semifinals (6 April)
1 | (Australia) Alex Haydon | 11 | 11 | 11
5 | (New Zealand) Ella Lash | 2 | 4 | 3
4 | (Australia) Erin Classen | 6 | 6 | 8
2 | (Australia) Sarah Cardwell | 11 | 11 | 11

Final (7 April)
1 | (Australia) Alex Haydon | 8 | 11 | 11 | 11
2 | (Australia) Sarah Cardwell | 11 | 9 | 3 | 6

Times are Australian Eastern Standard Time (UTC+10:00). To the best of five games.

Matches

| Date | Round | Time | Player 1 | Player 2 | Score |
|---|---|---|---|---|---|
| 4 April | Round 1 | 15:00 | Amelie Guziak (AUS) | Remashree Muniandy (AUS) | 9–11, 11–6, 11–5, 3–11, 11–7 |
| 4 April | Round 1 | 16:30 | Ella Lash (NZL) | Sarbani Maitra (AUS) | 11–3, 11–5, 11–6 |
| 4 April | Round 1 | 18:00 | Amity Alarcos (PNG) | Lee Sze Yu (AUS) | 11–4, 11–2, 11–2 |
| 4 April | Round 1 | 19:30 | Madison Lyon (AUS) | Shona Coxsedge (AUS) | 11–5, 11–7, 11–9 |
| 5 April | Quarterfinals | 17:00 | Alex Haydon (AUS) | Remashree Muniandy (AUS) | 11–4, 11–2, 11–5 |
| 5 April | Quarterfinals | 17:00 | Ella Lash (NZL) | Rachael Grinham (AUS) | 11–8, 11–8, 11–7 |
| 5 April | Quarterfinals | 18:30 | Erin Classen (AUS) | Lee Sze Yu (AUS) | 9–11, 11–5, 11–2, 11–8 |
| 5 April | Quarterfinals | 18:30 | Madison Lyon (AUS) | Sarah Cardwell (AUS) | 11–8, 11–9, 11–8 |
| 6 April | Semifinals | 16:00 | Alex Haydon (AUS) | Ella Lash (NZL) | 11–2, 11–4, 11–3 |
| 6 April | Semifinals | 17:30 | Erin Classen (AUS) | Sarah Cardwell (AUS) | 11–6, 11–6, 11–8 |
| 7 April | Final | 14:00 | Alex Haydon (AUS) | Sarah Cardwell (AUS) | 8–11, 11–9, 11–3, 11–6 |

== Europe ==
To be held at La Maison du Squash, Sautron, France on April 10–13.

=== Men's ===
Round 1 (10 April)
1 | (Portugal) Rui Soares | 8 | 7 | 11 | 4
(Spain) Iván Pérez | 11 | 11 | 4 | 11
(Austria) Aqeel Rehman | 11 | 6 | 5 | 13 | 5
8 | (Wales) Emyr Evans | 4 | 11 | 11 | 11 | 11
6 | (England) Perry Malik | 10 | 11 | 8 | 11 | 11
(Finland) Henrik Mustonen | 12 | 6 | 11 | 8 | 6
(Czech Republic) Jakub Solnický | 8 | 11 | 4 | 5
3 | (England) Ben Smith | 11 | 7 | 11 | 11
4 | (England) Finnlay Withington | 10 | 11 | 7 | 11 | 8
(France) Brice Nicolas | 12 | 4 | 11 | 8 | 11
(Czech Republic) Daniel Mekbib | 11 | 8 | 11 | 12
5 | (France) Toufik Mekhalfi | 7 | 11 | 5 | 10
7 | (Czech Republic) Martin Švec | 11 | 4 | 11 | 11
(Czech Republic) Viktor Byrtus | 9 | 11 | 3 | 5
(France) Edwin Clain | 11 | 11 | 11
2 | (England) Tom Walsh | 8 | 7 | 4

Quarter-finals (11 April)
(Spain) Iván Pérez | 5 | 9 | 5
8 | (Wales) Emyr Evans | 11 | 11 | 11
6 | (England) Perry Malik | 6 | 9 | 11
3 | (England) Ben Smith | 11 | 11 | 13
(France) Brice Nicolas | 10 | 7 | 11
(Czech Republic) Daniel Mekbib | 12 | 11 | 13
7 | (Czech Republic) Martin Švec | 11 | 11 | 13
(France) Edwin Clain | 9 | 9 | 11

Semifinals (12 April)
8 | (Wales) Emyr Evans | 12 | 5 | 11 | 11 | 12
3 | (England) Ben Smith | 14 | 11 | 6 | 9 | 14
(Czech Republic) Daniel Mekbib | 2 | 13 | 9 | 1
7 | (Czech Republic) Martin Švec | 11 | 11 | 11 | 11

Final (13 April)
3 | (England) Ben Smith | 11 | 11 | 11 | 9 | 5
7 | (Czech Republic) Martin Švec | 9 | 3 | 13 | 11 | 11

Times are Central European Summer Time (UTC+02:00). To the best of five games.

Matches

| Date | Round | Time | Player 1 | Player 2 | Score |
|---|---|---|---|---|---|
| 10 April | Round 1 | 16:15 | Perry Malik (ENG) | Henrik Mustonen (FIN) | 10–12, 11–6, 8–11, 11–8, 11–6 |
| 10 April | Round 1 | 17:00 | Aqeel Rehman (AUT) | Emyr Evans (WAL) | 4–11, 11–6, 11–5, 11–13, 11–5 |
| 10 April | Round 1 | 17:45 | Martin Švec (CZE) | Viktor Byrtus (CZE) | 11–9, 4–11, 11–3, 11–5 |
| 10 April | Round 1 | 18:30 | Daniel Mekbib (CZE) | Toufik Mekhalfi (FRA) | 11–7, 8–11, 11–5, 12–10 |
| 10 April | Round 1 | 19:15 | Rui Soares (POR) | Iván Pérez (ESP) | 11–8, 11–7, 4–11, 11–4 |
| 10 April | Round 1 | 20:00 | Finnlay Withington (ENG) | Brice Nicolas (FRA) | 12–10, 4–11, 11–7, 8–11, 11–8 |
| 10 April | Round 1 | 20:45 | Edwin Clain (ENG) | Tom Walsh (ENG) | 11–8, 11–7, 11–4 |
| 10 April | Round 1 | 21:30 | Jakub Solnický (CZE) | Ben Smith (ENG) | 11–8, 7–11, 11–4, 11–5 |
| 11 April | Quarterfinals | 18:30 | Iván Pérez (ESP) | Emyr Evans (WAL) | 11–5, 11–9, 11–5 |
| 11 April | Quarterfinals | 19:15 | Perry Malik (ENG) | Ben Smith (ENG) | 11–6, 11–9, 13–11 |
| 11 April | Quarterfinals | 20:00 | Brice Nicolas (FRA) | Daniel Mekbib (CZE) | 12–10, 11–7, 13–11 |
| 11 April | Quarterfinals | 20:45 | Martin Švec (CZE) | Edwin Clain (FRA) | 11–9, 11–9, 13–11 |
| 12 April | Semifinals | 19:30 | Emyr Evans (WAL) | Ben Smith (ENG) | 14–12, 11–5, 6–11, 9–11, 14–12 |
| 12 April | Semifinals | 21:30 | Daniel Mekbib (CZE) | Martin Švec (CZE) | 11–2, 11–13, 11–9, 11–1 |
| 13 April | Final | 19:30 | Ben Smith (ENG) | Martin Švec (CZE) | 9–11, 3–11, 13–11, 11–9, 11–5 |

=== Women's ===
Round 1 (10 April)
1 | (Spain) Marta Domínguez | 11 | 11 | 12 | 11
(Netherlands) Tessa ter Sluis | 9 | 6 | 14 | 8
(Republic of Ireland) Hannah Craig | 11 | 11 | 12
6 | (Czech Republic) Anna Serme | 7 | 2 | 10
7 | (Scotland) Alison Thomson | 11 | 11 | 11
(Denmark) Klara Møller | 6 | 4 | 6
(Germany) Katerina Týcová | 6 | 10 | 6
3 | (England) Asia Harris | 11 | 12 | 11
4 | (Switzerland) Nadia Pfister | 9 | 7 | 12
(England) Kiera Marshall | 11 | 11 | 14
(Wales) Lowri Roberts | 12 | 11 | 11
8 | (Austria) Jacqueline Peychär | 10 | 3 | 5
5 | (France) Lauren Baltayan | 11 | 11 | 11
(France) Élise Romba | 5 | 6 | 10
(Malta) Colette Sultana | 5 | 9 | 6
2 | (Germany) Saskia Beinhard | 11 | 11 | 11

Quarter-finals (11 April)
1 | (Spain) Marta Domínguez | 11 | 11 | 9 | 11 | 11
(Republic of Ireland) Hannah Craig | 5 | 5 | 11 | 13 | 6
7 | (Scotland) Alison Thomson | 7 | 10 | 11 | 11 | 11
3 | (England) Asia Harris | 11 | 12 | 9 | 8 | 8
(England) Kiera Marshall | 9 | 11 | 6 | 9
(Wales) Lowri Roberts | 11 | 8 | 11 | 11
5 | (France) Lauren Baltayan | 11 | 11 | 11
2 | (Germany) Saskia Beinhard | 7 | 7 | 7

Semifinals (12 April)
1 | (Spain) Marta Domínguez | 11 | 11 | 11
7 | (Scotland) Alison Thomson | 5 | 6 | 9
(Wales) Lowri Roberts | 5 | 11 | 14 | 11
5 | (France) Lauren Baltayan | 11 | 2 | 12 | 9

Final (13 April)
1 | (Spain) Marta Domínguez | 11 | 11 | 7 | 11
(Wales) Lowri Roberts | 5 | 4 | 11 | 6

Times are Central European Summer Time (UTC+02:00). To the best of five games.

Matches

| Date | Round | Time | Player 1 | Player 2 | Score |
|---|---|---|---|---|---|
| 10 April | Round 1 | 16:15 | Nadia Pfister (SUI) | Kiera Marshall (ENG) | 11–9, 11–7, 14–12 |
| 10 April | Round 1 | 17:00 | Lowri Roberts (WAL) | Jacqueline Peychär (AUT) | 12–10, 11–3, 11–5 |
| 10 April | Round 1 | 17:45 | Colette Sultana (MLT) | Saskia Beinhard (GER) | 11–5, 11–9, 11–6 |
| 10 April | Round 1 | 18:30 | Alison Thomson (SCO) | Klara Møller (DEN) | 11–6, 11–4, 11–6 |
| 10 April | Round 1 | 19:15 | Katerina Týcová (CZE) | Asia Harris (ENG) | 11–6, 12–10, 11–6 |
| 10 April | Round 1 | 20:00 | Lauren Baltayan (FRA) | Élise Romba (FRA) | 11–5, 11–6, 12–10 |
| 10 April | Round 1 | 20:45 | Marta Domínguez (ESP) | Tessa ter Sluis (NED) | 11–9, 11–6, 12–14, 11–8 |
| 10 April | Round 1 | 21:30 | Hannah Craig (IRE) | Anna Serme (CZE) | 11–7, 11–2, 12–10 |
| 11 April | Quarterfinals | 18:30 | Alison Thomson (SCO) | Asia Harris (ENG) | 7–11, 10–12, 11–9, 11–8, 11–8 |
| 11 April | Quarterfinals | 19:15 | Marta Domínguez (ESP) | Hannah Craig (IRE) | 11–5, 11–5, 9–11, 11–13, 11–6 |
| 11 April | Quarterfinals | 20:00 | Lauren Baltayan (FRA) | Saskia Beinhard (GER) | 11–7, 11–7, 11–7 |
| 11 April | Quarterfinals | 20:45 | Kiera Marshall (ENG) | Lowri Roberts (WAL) | 11–9, 8–11, 11–6, 11–9 |
| 12 April | Semifinals | 18:30 | Marta Domínguez (ESP) | Alison Thomson (SCO) | 11–5, 11–6, 11–9 |
| 12 April | Semifinals | 20:30 | Lowri Roberts (WAL) | Lauren Baltayan (FRA) | 5–11, 11–2, 14–12, 11–9 |
| 13 April | Final | 18:30 | Marta Domínguez (ESP) | Lowri Roberts (WAL) | 11–5, 11–4, 7–11, 11–6 |

== Africa ==
To be held at the Black Ball Sporting Club, New Cairo, Egypt on April 13–16.

=== Men's ===
Round 1 (13 April)
1 | (Egypt) Mazen Gamal | 11 | 11 | 12
(Egypt) Seif Tamer | 7 | 8 | 10
(Nigeria) Gabriel Olufunmilayo | 4 | 12 | 12 | 3 | 6
6 | (Egypt) Moustafa El Sirty | 11 | 10 | 10 | 11 | 11
7 | (Egypt) Mohamed Nasser | 11 | 11 | 11
(Egypt) Ziad Ibrahim | 7 | 7 | 8
(Namibia) Arno Diekmann | 4 | 4 | 3
4 | (Egypt) Seif Shenawy | 11 | 11 | 11
3 | (Egypt) Mohamad Zakaria | 11 | 11 | 11
(Egypt) Khaled Labib | 6 | 6 | 1
(Egypt) Hazem Hossam | 6 | 11 | 11 | 3 | 11
8 | (South Africa) Dewald van Niekerk | 11 | 4 | 7 | 11 | 2
5 | (Egypt) Kareem El Torkey | 11 | 4 | 10 | 11 | 11
(Egypt) Omar Elkattan | 9 | 11 | 12 | 8 | 8
(Egypt) Abdelrahman Abdelkhalek | 9 | 8 | 8
2 | (Egypt) Yassin ElShafei | 11 | 11 | 11

Quarter-finals (14 April)
1 | (Egypt) Mazen Gamal | 11 | 2 | 4 | 11 | 9
6 | (Egypt) Moustafa El Sirty | 8 | 11 | 11 | 5 | 11
7 | (Egypt) Mohamed Nasser | 11 | 11 | 11
4 | (Egypt) Seif Shenawy | 6 | 8 | 5
3 | (Egypt) Mohamad Zakaria | 11 | 11 | 11
(Egypt) Hazem Hossam | 7 | 5 | 7
5 | (Egypt) Kareem El Torkey | 7 | 11 | 11 | 11
2 | (Egypt) Yassin ElShafei | 11 | 8 | 8 | 7

Semifinals (15 April)
6 | (Egypt) Moustafa El Sirty | 6 | 11 | 11 | 11
7 | (Egypt) Mohamed Nasser | 11 | 5 | 3 | 6
3 | (Egypt) Mohamad Zakaria | 10 | 11 | 10 | 11 | 4
5 | (Egypt) Kareem El Torkey | 12 | 6 | 12 | 7 | 11

Final (16 April)
6 | (Egypt) Moustafa El Sirty | 10 | 11 | 7 | 11 | 14
5 | (Egypt) Kareem El Torkey | 12 | 6 | 11 | 2 | 12

Times are Eastern European Time (UTC+02:00). To the best of five games.

Matches

| Date | Round | Time | Player 1 | Player 2 | Score |
|---|---|---|---|---|---|
| 13 April | Round 1 | 12:00 | Mazen Gamal (EGY) | Seif Tamer (EGY) | 11–7, 11–8, 12–10 |
| 13 April | Round 1 | 12:00 | Gabriel Olufunmilayo (NGR) | Moustafa El Sirty (EGY) | 11–4, 10–12, 10–12, 11–3, 11–6 |
| 13 April | Round 1 | 12:45 | Mohamed Nasser (EGY) | Ziad Ibrahim (EGY) | 11–7, 11–7, 11–8 |
| 13 April | Round 1 | 12:45 | Arno Diekmann (NAM) | Seif Shenawy (EGY) | 11–4, 11–4, 11–3 |
| 13 April | Round 1 | 13:30 | Mohamad Zakaria (EGY) | Khaled Labib (EGY) | 11–6, 11–6, 11–1 |
| 13 April | Round 1 | 13:30 | Hazem Hossam (EGY) | Dewald van Niekerk (RSA) | 6–11, 11–4, 11–7, 3–11, 11–2 |
| 13 April | Round 1 | 14:15 | Kareem El Torkey (EGY) | Omar Elkattan (EGY) | 11–9, 4–11, 10–12, 11–8, 11–8 |
| 13 April | Round 1 | 14:15 | Abdelrahman Abdelkhalek (EGY) | Yassin ElShafei (EGY) | 11–9, 11–8, 11–8 |
| 14 April | Quarterfinals | 12:00 | Mazen Gamal (EGY) | Moustafa El Sirty (EGY) | 8–11, 11–2, 11–4, 5–11, 11–9 |
| 14 April | Quarterfinals | 12:45 | Mohamed Nasser (EGY) | Seif Shenawy (EGY) | 11–6, 11–8, 11–5 |
| 14 April | Quarterfinals | 13:30 | Mohamad Zakaria (EGY) | Hazem Hossam (EGY) | 11–7, 11–5, 11–7 |
| 14 April | Quarterfinals | 14:15 | Kareem El Torkey (EGY) | Yassin ElShafei (EGY) | 7–11, 11–8, 11–8, 11–7 |
| 15 April | Semifinals | 12:00 | Moustafa El Sirty (EGY) | Mohamed Nasser (EGY) | 6–11, 11–5, 11–3, 11–6 |
| 15 April | Semifinals | 12:45 | Mohamad Zakaria (EGY) | Kareem El Torkey (EGY) | 12–10, 6–11, 12–10, 7–11, 11–4 |
| 16 April | Final | 15:00 | Moustafa El Sirty (EGY) | Kareem El Torkey (EGY) | 10–12, 11–6, 7–11, 11–2, 14–12 |

=== Women's ===
Round 1 (13 April)
1 | (Egypt) Nardine Garas | 11 | 11 | 11
(Nigeria) Abdulazeez Rofiat | 2 | 4 | 1
(Egypt) Lojayn Gohary | 11 | 9 | 2 | 6
5 | (Egypt) Nour Megahed | 5 | 11 | 11 | 11
6 | (Egypt) Ingy Hammouda | 11 | 11 | 6 | 11
(Egypt) Karma Allam | 8 | 6 | 11 | 3
(South Africa) Hayley Ward | 6 | 11 | 13 | 11
3 | (Egypt) Hana Ismail | 11 | 3 | 11 | 8
4 | (Egypt) Habiba Hani | 14 | 11 | 11
(Egypt) Salma El-Alfy | 12 | 7 | 7
(Egypt) Nour Ramy | 0 | 1 | 0
8 | (Egypt) Malak Fathy | 11 | 11 | 11
7 | (Egypt) Nour Khafagy | 11 | 11 | 11
2 | (Nigeria) Olatunji Busayo | 6 | 4 | 6
(Egypt) Nadien Elhammamy | 11 | 11 | 11
2 | (Egypt) Amina El Rihany | 9 | 6 | 6

Quarter-finals (14 April)
1 | (Egypt) Nardine Garas | 12 | 11 | 11
5 | (Egypt) Nour Megahed | 10 | 7 | 6
6 | (Egypt) Ingy Hammouda | 11 | 13 | 11
(South Africa) Hayley Ward | 8 | 11 | 9
4 | (Egypt) Habiba Hani | 13 | 11 | 6 | 9 | 11
8 | (Egypt) Malak Fathy | 11 | 8 | 11 | 11 | 3
7 | (Egypt) Nour Khafagy | 11 | 10 | 2
(Egypt) Nadien Elhammamy | 13 | 12 | 11

Semifinals (15 April)
1 | (Egypt) Nardine Garas | 11 | 11 | 11
6 | (Egypt) Ingy Hammouda | 6 | 2 | 8
4 | (Egypt) Habiba Hani | 9 | 14 | 8 | 10
(Egypt) Nadien Elhammamy | 11 | 12 | 11 | 12

Final (16 April)
1 | (Egypt) Nardine Garas | 11 | 14 | 11
(Egypt) Nadien Elhammamy | 8 | 12 | 9

Times are Eastern European Time (UTC+02:00). To the best of five games.

Matches

| Date | Round | Time | Player 1 | Player 2 | Score |
|---|---|---|---|---|---|
| 13 April | Round 1 | 16:00 | Nardine Garas (EGY) | Abdulazeez Rofiat (NGR) | 11–2, 11–4, 11–1 |
| 13 April | Round 1 | 16:00 | Lojayn Gohary (EGY) | Nour Megahed (EGY) | 5–11, 11–9, 11–2, 11–6 |
| 13 April | Round 1 | 16:45 | Ingy Hammouda (EGY) | Karma Allam (EGY) | 11–8, 11–6, 6–11, 11–3 |
| 13 April | Round 1 | 16:45 | Hayley Ward (RSA) | Hana Ismail (EGY) | 6–11, 11–6, 13–11, 11–8 |
| 13 April | Round 1 | 17:30 | Habiba Hani (EGY) | Salma El-Alfy (EGY) | 14–12, 11–7, 11–7 |
| 13 April | Round 1 | 17:30 | Nour Ramy (EGY) | Malak Fathy (EGY) | 11–0, 11–1, 11–0 |
| 13 April | Round 1 | 18:15 | Nour Khafagy (EGY) | Olatunji Busayo (NGR) | 11–6, 11–4, 11–6 |
| 13 April | Round 1 | 18:15 | Nadien Elhammamy (EGY) | Amina El Rihany (EGY) | 11–9, 11–6, 11–6 |
| 14 April | Quarterfinals | 16:00 | Nardine Garas (EGY) | Nour Megahed (EGY) | 12–10, 11-7, 11–6 |
| 14 April | Quarterfinals | 16:45 | Ingy Hammouda (EGY) | Hayley Ward (RSA) | 11–8, 13–11, 11–9 |
| 14 April | Quarterfinals | 17:30 | Habiba Hani (EGY) | Malak Fathy (EGY) | 13–11, 11–8, 6–11, 9–11, 11–3 |
| 14 April | Quarterfinals | 18:15 | Nour Khafagy (EGY) | Nadien Elhammamy (EGY) | 13–11, 12–10, 11–2 |
| 15 April | Semifinals | 13:30 | Nardine Garas (EGY) | Ingy Hammouda (EGY) | 11–6, 11–2, 11–8 |
| 15 April | Semifinals | 14:15 | Habiba Hani (EGY) | Nadien Elhammamy (EGY) | 11–9, 12–14, 11–8, 12–10 |
| 16 April | Final | 16:00 | Nardine Garas (EGY) | Nadien Elhammamy (EGY) | 11–8, 14–12, 11–9 |

== Asia ==
To be held at the Seremban 2 Squash Complex, Seremban, Malaysia on April 18–21.

=== Men's ===
Round 1 (18 April)
1 | (Japan) Ryūnosuke Tsukue | 11 | 11 | 11
(Hong Kong) Ho Ka Hei | 6 | 4 | 7
(Iraq) Mohamed Hassan | 17 | 6 | 2
8 | (Sri Lanka) Ravindu Laksiri | 19 | 11 | 11
5 | (Hong Kong) Wong Chi Him | 11 | 6 | 7 | 10
(Malaysia) Bryan Lim | 4 | 11 | 11 | 12
(Malaysia) Ong Sai Hung | 9 | 11 | 7 | 11 | 11
4 | (Hong Kong) Matthew Lai | 11 | 8 | 11 | 5 | 7
3 | (Hong Kong) Tang Ming Hong | 7 | 11 | 11 | 11
(Japan) Tomotaka Endo | 11 | 5 | 7 | 7
(Malaysia) Hafiz Zhafri | 7 | 3 | 11 | 5
6 | (Malaysia) Mohd Syafiq Kamal | 11 | 11 | 6 | 11
7 | (Malaysia) Darren Pragasam | 11 | 7 | 11 | 11
(Kuwait) Ammar Al-Tamimi | 9 | 11 | 2 | 1
(Hong Kong) Leo Chung | 3 | 8 | 2
2 | (Malaysia) Addeen Idrakie | 11 | 11 | 11

Quarter-finals (19 April)
1 | (Japan) Ryūnosuke Tsukue | 11 | 11 | 11
8 | (Sri Lanka) Ravindu Laksiri | 4 | 5 | 3
(Malaysia) Bryan Lim | 11 | 9 | 6 | 11 | 11
(Malaysia) Ong Sai Hung | 8 | 11 | 11 | 4 | 6
3 | (Hong Kong) Tang Ming Hong | 7 | 11 | 7 | 11 | 11
6 | (Malaysia) Mohd Syafiq Kamal | 11 | 5 | 11 | 8 | 9
7 | (Malaysia) Darren Pragasam | 12 | 11 | 4 | 11 | 4
2 | (Malaysia) Addeen Idrakie | 14 | 7 | 11 | 9 | 11

Semifinals (20 April)
1 | (Japan) Ryūnosuke Tsukue | 11 | 7 | 11 | 11
(Malaysia) Bryan Lim | 8 | 11 | 2 | 8
3 | (Hong Kong) Tang Ming Hong | 11 | 11 | 5 | 6
2 | (Malaysia) Addeen Idrakie | 7 | 13 | 11 | 11

Final (21 April)
1 | (Japan) Ryūnosuke Tsukue | 11 | 11 | 11
2 | (Malaysia) Addeen Idrakie | 9 | 8 | 3

Times are Malaysia Time (UTC+08:00). To the best of five games.

Matches

| Date | Round | Time | Player 1 | Player 2 | Score |
|---|---|---|---|---|---|
| 18 April | Round 1 | 12:45 | Ryūnosuke Tsukue (JPN) | Ho Ka Hei (HKG) | 11–6, 11–4, 11–7 |
| 18 April | Round 1 | 12:45 | Mohamed Hassan (IRQ) | Ravindu Laksiri (SRI) | 19–17, 11–6, 11–2 |
| 18 April | Round 1 | 14:15 | Wong Chi Him (HKG) | Bryan Lim (MYS) | 4–11, 11–6, 11–7, 12–10 |
| 18 April | Round 1 | 14:15 | Ong Sai Hung (MYS) | Matthew Lai (HKG) | 9–11, 11–8, 7–11, 11–5, 11–7 |
| 18 April | Round 1 | 15:45 | Tang Ming Hong (HKG) | Tomotaka Endo (JPN) | 7–11, 11–5, 11–7, 11–7 |
| 18 April | Round 1 | 15:45 | Hafiz Zhafri (MYS) | Mohd Syafiq Kamal (MYS) | 11–7, 11–3, 6–11, 11–5 |
| 18 April | Round 1 | 17:15 | Darren Pragasam (MYS) | Ammar Al-Tamimi (KUW) | 11–9, 7–11, 11–2, 11–1 |
| 18 April | Round 1 | 17:15 | Leo Chung (HKG) | Addeen Idrakie (MYS) | 11–3, 11–8, 11–2 |
| 19 April | Quarterfinals | 13:00 | Ryūnosuke Tsukue (JPN) | Ravindu Laksiri (SRI) | 11–4, 11–5, 11–3 |
| 19 April | Quarterfinals | 14:30 | Bryan Lim (MYS) | Ong Sai Hung (MYS) | 11–8, 9–11, 6–11, 11–4, 11–6 |
| 19 April | Quarterfinals | 16:00 | Tang Ming Hong (HKG) | Mohd Syafiq Kamal (MYS) | 7–11, 11–5, 7–11, 11–8, 11–9 |
| 19 April | Quarterfinals | 17:50 | Darren Pragasam (MYS) | Addeen Idrakie (MYS) | 14–12, 7–11, 11–4, 9–11, 11–4 |
| 20 April | Semifinals | 12:45 | Ryūnosuke Tsukue (JPN) | Bryan Lim (MYS) | 11–8, 7–11, 11–2, 11–8 |
| 20 April | Semifinals | 14:15 | Tang Ming Hong (HKG) | Addeen Idrakie (MYS) | 7–11, 13–11, 11–5, 11–6 |
| 21 April | Final | 15:45 | Ryūnosuke Tsukue (JPN) | Addeen Idrakie (MYS) | 11–9, 11–8, 11–3 |

=== Women's ===
Round 1 (18 April)
1 | (Hong Kong) Cheng Nga Ching | 8 | 11 | 11 | 6 | 11
(Malaysia) Goh Zhi Xuan | 11 | 5 | 6 | 11 | 6
(Malaysia) Chen Yu Jie | 7 | 11 | 5 | 11 | 13
8 | (South Korea) Heo Min-gyeong | 11 | 7 | 11 | 5 | 11
5 | (Hong Kong) Heylie Fung | 13 | 11 | 11
(Japan) Risa Sugimoto | 11 | 3 | 6
(Japan) Akari Midorikawa | 6 | 11 | 1 | 5
4 | (Malaysia) Chan Yiwen | 11 | 3 | 11 | 11
3 | (Singapore) Wai Yhann Au Yeong | 11 | 11 | 11
(Macau) Liu Kwai Chi | 5 | 2 | 4
(Pakistan) Anam Mustafa Aziz | 5 | 2 | 6
7 | (Hong Kong) Toby Tse | 11 | 11 | 11
6 | (Japan) Erisa Sano | 7 | 10 | 4
(Malaysia) Sehveetrraa Kumar | 11 | 12 | 11
(Malaysia) Thanusaa Uthrian | 7 | 11 | 3 | 11 | 5
2 | (India) Akanksha Salunkhe | 11 | 8 | 11 | 7 | 11

Quarter-finals (19 April)
1 | (Hong Kong) Cheng Nga Ching | 11 | 11 | 11
(Malaysia) Chen Yu Jie | 9 | 6 | 7
5 | (Hong Kong) Heylie Fung | 9 | 11 | 3 | 9
4 | (Malaysia) Chan Yiwen | 11 | 8 | 11 | 11
3 | (Singapore) Wai Yhann Au Yeong | 11 | 5 | 6 | 7
7 | (Hong Kong) Toby Tse | 5 | 11 | 11 | 11
(Malaysia) Sehveetrraa Kumar | 11 | 11 | 11
2 | (India) Akanksha Salunkhe | 6 | 5 | 8

Semifinals (20 April)
1 | (Hong Kong) Cheng Nga Ching | 5 | 1 | 8
4 | (Malaysia) Chan Yiwen | 11 | 11 | 11
7 | (Hong Kong) Toby Tse | 2 | 8 | 6
(Malaysia) Sehveetrraa Kumar | 11 | 11 | 11

Final (21 April)
4 | (Malaysia) Chan Yiwen | 11 | 11 | 11
(Malaysia) Sehveetrraa Kumar | 6 | 3 | 3

Times are Malaysia Time (UTC+08:00). To the best of five games.

Matches

| Date | Round | Time | Player 1 | Player 2 | Score |
|---|---|---|---|---|---|
| 18 April | Round 1 | 12:00 | Cheng Nga Ching (HKG) | Goh Zhi Xuan (MYS) | 8–11, 11–5, 11–6, 6–11, 11–6 |
| 18 April | Round 1 | 12:00 | Chen Yu Jie (MYS) | Heo Min-gyeong (KOR) | 7–11, 11–7, 5–11, 11–5, 13–11 |
| 18 April | Round 1 | 13:30 | Heylie Fung (HKG) | Risa Sugimoto (JPN) | 13–11, 11–3, 11–6 |
| 18 April | Round 1 | 13:30 | Akari Midorikawa (JPN) | Chan Yiwen (MYS) | 11–6, 3–11, 11–1, 11–5 |
| 18 April | Round 1 | 15:00 | Wai Yhann Au Yeong (SGP) | Liu Kwai Chi (MAC) | 11–5, 11–2, 11–4 |
| 18 April | Round 1 | 15:00 | Anam Mustafa Aziz (PAK) | Toby Tse (HKG) | 11–5, 11–2, 11–6 |
| 18 April | Round 1 | 16:30 | Erisa Sano (JPN) | Sehveetrraa Kumar (MYS) | 11–7, 12–10, 11–4 |
| 18 April | Round 1 | 16:30 | Thanusaa Uthrian (MYS) | Akanksha Salunkhe (IND) | 11–7, 8–11, 11–3, 7–11, 11–5 |
| 19 April | Quarterfinals | 12:15 | Cheng Nga Ching (HKG) | Chen Yu Jie (MYS) | 11–9, 11–6, 11–7 |
| 19 April | Quarterfinals | 13:45 | Heylie Fung (HKG) | Chan Yiwen (MYS) | 11–9, 8–11, 11–3, 11–9 |
| 19 April | Quarterfinals | 15:15 | Wai Yhann Au Yeong (SGP) | Toby Tse (HKG) | 5–11, 11–5, 11–6, 11–7 |
| 19 April | Quarterfinals | 16:45 | Sehveetrraa Kumar (MYS) | Akanksha Salunkhe (IND) | 11–6, 11–5, 11–8 |
| 20 April | Semifinals | 12:00 | Cheng Nga Ching (HKG) | Chan Yiwen (MYS) | 11–5, 11–1, 11–8 |
| 20 April | Semifinals | 13:30 | Toby Tse (HKG) | Sehveetrraa Kumar (MYS) | 11–2, 11–8, 11–6 |
| 21 April | Final | 15:00 | Chan Yiwen (MYS) | Sehveetrraa Kumar (MYS) | 11–6, 11–3, 11–3 |

== Pan America ==
To be held at the Play Squash Academy, Columbia, United States on April 18–21.

=== Men's ===
Round 1 (18 April)
1 | (United States) Spencer Lovejoy | 11 | 11 | 11
(Colombia) Andrés Herrera | 7 | 2 | 5
(Brazil) Diego Gobbi | 11 | 11 | 11
7 | (United States) Dillon Huang | 3 | 8 | 7
6 | (Mexico) Alejandro Reyes | 11 | 11 | 11
(Bermuda) Taylor Carrick | 8 | 9 | 6
(Colombia) Edgar Ramírez | 5 | 10 | 9
3 | (Argentina) Jeremías Azaña | 11 | 12 | 11
4 | (Colombia) Matías Knudsen | 7 | 11 | 11 | 6 | 9
(Mexico) Sebastián Salazar | 11 | 8 | 6 | 11 | 11
(Guatemala) Josué Enríquez | 11 | 8 | 11 | 3 | 9
5 | (Guatemala) Alejandro Enríquez | 8 | 11 | 9 | 11 | 11
8 | (United States) Christopher Gordon | 11 | 12 | 11 | 8 | 8
(Canada) Liam Marrison | 9 | 14 | 9 | 11 | 11
(Ecuador) David Costales | 11 | 8 | 11 | 11
2 | (Canada) Salah Eltorgman | 5 | 11 | 4 | 9

Quarter-finals (19 April)
1 | (United States) Spencer Lovejoy | 10 | 11 | 11 | 11
(Brazil) Diego Gobbi | 12 | 4 | 3 | 1
6 | (Mexico) Alejandro Reyes | 5 | 11 | 3 | 4
3 | (Argentina) Jeremías Azaña | 11 | 9 | 11 | 11
(Mexico) Sebastián Salazar | 11 | 8 | 7 | 13 | 13
5 | (Guatemala) Alejandro Enríquez | 9 | 11 | 11 | 11 | 15
(Canada) Liam Marrison | 6 | 4 | 11 | 3
(Ecuador) David Costales | 11 | 11 | 7 | 11

Semifinals (20 April)
1 | (United States) Spencer Lovejoy | 11 | 11 | 11
3 | (Argentina) Jeremías Azaña | 9 | 8 | 5
5 | (Guatemala) Alejandro Enríquez | 11 | 9 | 11 | 4 | 11
(Ecuador) David Costales | 5 | 11 | 8 | 11 | 6

Final (21 April)
1 | (United States) Spencer Lovejoy | 13 | 11 | 11
5 | (Guatemala) Alejandro Enríquez | 11 | 5 | 4

Times are Eastern Daylight Time (UTC−04:00). To the best of five games.

Matches

| Date | Round | Time | Player 1 | Player 2 | Score |
|---|---|---|---|---|---|
| 18 April | Round 1 | 12:00 | Spencer Lovejoy (USA) | Andrés Herrera (COL) | 11–7, 11–2, 11–5 |
| 18 April | Round 1 | 13:00 | Diego Gobbi (BRA) | Dillon Huang (USA) | 11–3, 11–8, 11–7 |
| 18 April | Round 1 | 14:00 | Alejandro Reyes (BRA) | Taylor Carrick (BER) | 11–8, 11–9, 11–6 |
| 18 April | Round 1 | 15:00 | Edgar Ramírez (COL) | Jeremías Azaña (ARG) | 11–5, 12–10, 11–9 |
| 18 April | Round 1 | 16:00 | Matías Knudsen (COL) | Sebastián Salazar (MEX) | 11–7, 8–11, 6–11, 11–6, 11–9 |
| 18 April | Round 1 | 17:00 | Josué Enríquez (GUA) | Alejandro Enríquez (GUA) | 8–11, 11–8, 9–11, 11–3, 11–9 |
| 18 April | Round 1 | 18:00 | Christopher Gordon (USA) | Liam Marrison (CAN) | 9–11, 14–12, 9–11, 11–8, 11–8 |
| 18 April | Round 1 | 19:00 | David Costales (ECU) | Salah Eltorgman (CAN) | 11–5, 8–11, 11–4, 11–9 |
| 19 April | Quarterfinals | 12:00 | Spencer Lovejoy (USA) | Diego Gobbi (BRA) | 10–12, 11–4, 11–3, 11–1 |
| 19 April | Quarterfinals | 14:00 | Alejandro Reyes (BRA) | Jeremías Azaña (ARG) | 11–5, 9–11, 11–3, 11–4 |
| 19 April | Quarterfinals | 16:00 | Sebastián Salazar (MEX) | Alejandro Enríquez (GUA) | 9–11, 11–8, 11–7, 11–13, 15–13 |
| 19 April | Quarterfinals | 18:00 | Liam Marrison (CAN) | David Costales (ECU) | 11–6, 11–4, 7–11, 11–3 |
| 20 April | Semifinals | 14:00 | Spencer Lovejoy (USA) | Jeremías Azaña (ARG) | 11–9, 11–8, 11–5 |
| 20 April | Semifinals | 16:00 | Alejandro Enríquez (GUA) | David Costales (ECU) | 11–5, 9–11, 11–8, 4–11, 11–6 |
| 21 April | Final | 15:00 | Spencer Lovejoy (USA) | Alejandro Enríquez (GUA) | 13–11, 11–5, 11–4 |

=== Women's ===
Round 1 (18 April)
1 | (United States) Caroline Fouts | 11 | 11 | 11
(United States) Arisha Khan | 3 | 0 | 1
(Guyana) Mary Fung-A-Fat | 6 | 11 | 7 | 10
6 | (Guatemala) Winifer Bonilla | 11 | 6 | 11 | 12
5 | (Guatemala) Tabita Gaitán | 5 | 3 | 1
(Barbados) Margot Prow | 11 | 11 | 11
(United States) Eliza Schuster | 1 | 6 | 6
3 | (United States) Riya Navani | 11 | 11 | 11
4 | (Colombia) Laura Tovar | 11 | 11 | 11
(Guatemala) Mary Mijas | 6 | 4 | 6
(Guatemala) Darlyn Sandoval | 2 | 11 | 11 | 9 | 4
7 | (Canada) Iman Shaheen | 11 | 9 | 9 | 11 | 11
8 | (Brazil) Bruna Marchesi | 3 | 4 | 0
(Mexico) Sarahí López | 11 | 11 | 11
(Canada) Sara Khan | 6 | 3 | 1
2 | (Canada) Danielle Ray | 11 | 11 | 11

Quarter-finals (19 April)
1 | (United States) Caroline Fouts | 11 | 11 | 11
6 | (Guatemala) Winifer Bonilla | 4 | 8 | 6
(Barbados) Margot Prow | 2 | 4 | 11 | 5
3 | (United States) Riya Navani | 11 | 11 | 7 | 11
4 | (Colombia) Laura Tovar | 11 | 11 | 11
7 | (Canada) Iman Shaheen | 4 | 9 | 5
(Mexico) Sarahí López | 8 | 11 | 11 | 11
2 | (Canada) Danielle Ray | 11 | 8 | 7 | 9

Semifinals (20 April)
1 | (United States) Caroline Fouts | 11 | 11 | 11
3 | (United States) Riya Navani | 2 | 7 | 4
4 | (Colombia) Laura Tovar | 4 | 3 | 8
(Mexico) Sarahí López | 11 | 11 | 11

Final (21 April)
1 | (United States) Caroline Fouts | 11 | 11 | 11
(Mexico) Sarahí López | 8 | 4 | 5

Times are Eastern Daylight Time (UTC−04:00). To the best of five games.

Matches

| Date | Round | Time | Player 1 | Player 2 | Score |
|---|---|---|---|---|---|
| 18 April | Round 1 | 12:00 | Caroline Fouts (USA) | Arisha Khan (USA) | 11–3, 11–0, 11–1 |
| 18 April | Round 1 | 13:00 | Mary Fung-A-Fat (GUY) | Winifer Bonilla (GUA) | 11–6, 6–11, 11–7, 12–10 |
| 18 April | Round 1 | 14:00 | Tabita Gaitán (GUA) | Margot Prow (BAR) | 11–5, 11–3, 11–1 |
| 18 April | Round 1 | 15:00 | Eliza Schuster (USA) | Riya Navani (USA) | 11–1, 11–6, 11–6 |
| 18 April | Round 1 | 16:00 | Laura Tovar (COL) | Mary Mijas (GUA) | 11–6, 11–4, 11–6 |
| 18 April | Round 1 | 17:00 | Darlyn Sandoval (GUA) | Iman Shaheen (CAN) | 11–2, 9–11, 9–11, 11–9, 11–4 |
| 18 April | Round 1 | 18:00 | Bruna Marchesi (BRA) | Sarahí López (MEX) | 11–3, 11–4, 11–0 |
| 18 April | Round 1 | 19:00 | Sara Khan (CAN) | Danielle Ray (CAN) | 11–6, 11–3, 11–1 |
| 19 April | Quarterfinals | 13:00 | Caroline Fouts (USA) | Winifer Bonilla (GUA) | 11–4, 11–8, 11–6 |
| 19 April | Quarterfinals | 15:00 | Margot Prow (BAR) | Riya Navani (USA) | 11–2, 11–4, 7–11, 11–5 |
| 19 April | Quarterfinals | 17:00 | Laura Tovar (COL) | Iman Shaheen (CAN) | 11–4, 11–9, 11–5 |
| 19 April | Quarterfinals | 19:00 | Sarahí López (MEX) | Danielle Ray (CAN) | 8–11, 11–8, 11–7, 11–9 |
| 20 April | Semifinals | 13:00 | Caroline Fouts (USA) | Riya Navani (USA) | 11–2, 11–7, 11–4 |
| 20 April | Semifinals | 15:00 | Laura Tovar (COL) | Sarahí López (MEX) | 11–4, 11–3, 11–8 |
| 21 April | Final | 16:00 | Caroline Fouts (USA) | Sarahí López (MEX) | 11–8, 11–4, 11–5 |

== See also ==
- 2024 PSA Men's World Squash Championship
- 2024 PSA Women's World Squash Championship
- 2023–24 PSA World Tour
