= Diego Gobbi =

Brazilian squash player (born 1995)

Personal information
- Nationality: Brazilian
- Born: June 8, 1995 (age 31) São Paulo, Brazil

Sport
- Retired: Active

Men's singles
- Highest ranking: No. 85 (October 2025)
- Current ranking: No. 86 (November 2025)
- Title: 4

Diego Gobbi (born 8 June 1995 in São Paulo) is a Brazilian professional squash player. He reached a career high ranking of 85 in the world during October 2025.

== Biography ==
He won the 2021 X5 Squash Open.

In September 2025, he won his fourth PSA title after securing victory in the Helsinki PSA Challenger during the 2025–26 PSA Squash Tour.
