= Jakub Solnický =

Czech squash player (born 1994)

Personal information
- Born: 16 December 1994 (age 31) Opava, Czech Republic

Sport
- Country: Czechia
- Turned pro: 2017
- Retired: Active
- Racquet used: Eye

Men's singles
- Highest ranking: No. 86 (January 2022)
- Current ranking: No. 125 (February 2026)
- Title: 6

Jakub Solnický (born 16 December 1994) is a Czech professional squash player. He reached a career high ranking of 86 in the world during January 2022.

== Biography ==
In March 2024, Solnický won his third successive Czech national title.

In February 2025, Solnický won his fourth PSA title after securing victory in the Brno Open and followed up the success on 1 March 2025 by winning a fifth title at Poznań Open during the 2024–25 PSA Squash Tour. Solnický won a sixth title in February 2026, during the 2025–26 PSA Squash Tour, winning the Brno Open.
