= Yassin ElShafei =

Egyptian squash player (born 2001)

Personal information
- Born: 16 June 2001 (age 25) Cairo, Egypt

Sport
- Turned pro: 2019
- Retired: Active

Men's singles
- Highest ranking: No. 64 (November 2024)
- Current ranking: No. 76 (November 2025)
- Title: 9

Yassin ElShafei (born 16 June 2001) is an Egyptian professional squash player. He reached a career high ranking of 64 in the world during November 2024.

== Career ==
In October 2024, ElShafei won his 7th PSA title after securing victory in the Open de Lagord during the 2024–25 PSA Squash Tour.

In October 2025, he won his 9th PSA title after securing victory in the Open de Lagord during the 2025–26 PSA Squash Tour.
