= Erin Classen =

Australian squash player (born 2004)

Personal information
- Born: 18 August 2004 (age 22) Perth, Australia
- Years active: Currently Active

Sport
- Country: Australia
- Turned pro: 2022
- Retired: Active
- Racquet used: Tecnifibre

Women's singles
- Highest ranking: No. 130 (Nov 2022)
- Current ranking: No. 141 (Jan 2024)
- Updated on June 2022

Erin Classen (born 18 August 2004 in Perth) is an Australian professional squash player. As of January 2024, she was ranked number 141 in the world. She won the 2022 Golden Open. She won the 2021 Australian Junior Open U-19, becoming the third Western Australian women to do so. Furthermore, in 2021 she was the joint winner of the Rebel Sport West Junior Sport Star of the Year, which is arguably the most prestigious sporting award that a West Australian junior athlete can win. Erin was also the youngest player at the age 14 to win the WA Open title and won it again more recently. She has played in three world junior championships. Her awards also include receiving in 2021 a Tier 3 scholarship from the Sport Australia Hall of Fame Scholarship and Mentoring Program. Eric has also been profiled as one of the possible futures for Australian pro-squash.
