= Nour Megahed =

Egyptian squash player (born 2005)

Personal information
- Born: 24 July 2005 (age 21) Tanta, Egypt

Sport
- Country: Egypt
- Handedness: 2021
- Retired: Active
- Racquet used: Tecnifibre

Women's singles
- Highest ranking: No. 71 (November 2024)
- Current ranking: No. 110 (December 2025)
- Title: 5

Nour Megahed (born 24 July 2005) is an Egyptian professional squash player. She reached a career high ranking of 71 in the world during November 2024.

== Career ==
She won the 2023 PSNS President's Trophy tournament of the world tour. Also in 2023, she competed at the Aston and Fincher Sutton Coldfield International 2023, beating Au Yeong Wai Yhann in straight games in the quarter final. She played against fellow Egyptian Menna Walid in the final.

In late 2024, Megahed won her 3rd and 4th PSA titles after securing victory in the Czech Open and Bern Open during the 2024–25 PSA Squash Tour.

In December 2025, she won her 5th PSA title after securing victory in the Schräglage Open during the 2025–26 PSA Squash Tour.
