= Mohamed Zakaria =

Egyptian squash player (born 2002)

Personal information
- Born: 23 September 2007 (age 19) Alexandria, Egypt
- Height: 174 cm (5 ft 9 in)
- Weight: 60 kg (132 lb)

Sport
- Country: Egypt
- Turned pro: 2022
- Racquet used: Dunlop

Men's singles
- Highest ranking: No. 4 (June 2026)
- Current ranking: No. 4 (June 2026)
- Title: 8

Mohamed Zakaria (born 23 September 2007) is an Egyptian professional squash player. He reached a career high ranking of 10 in the world during January 2026.

== Biography ==
In October 2023 Zakaria made history by becoming the youngest ever male winner on the PSA Tour. He had only just turned 16 when he won the LA Open. He had previously finished runner-up in the World Junior Championship.

Zakaria broke into the world's top 16 players in May 2025. He won his 6th PSA title after securing victory in the Bermuda Open during the 2024–25 PSA Squash Tour.

Zakaria reached a career high 11 in the world during December 2025 after securing victory in the Indian Open during the 2025–26 PSA Squash Tour and won the Karachi Open in January 2026.
