= Joseph White (squash player) =

Australian squash player (born 1997)

Personal information
- Nationality: Australian
- Born: 28 September 1997 (age 28) Townsville, Australia

Sport
- Turned pro: 2015
- Retired: Active
- Racquet used: Head

Men's singles
- Highest ranking: No. 76 (April 2024)
- Current ranking: No. 76 (April 2026)
- Title: 4

Joseph White (born 28 September 1997) is an Australian professional squash player. He reached a career high ranking of 76 in the world during April 2024.

== Biography ==
White studied Business (Sport Management) at Deakin University.

He won the 2021 Howick Open. White is sometimes referred to as Joseph "Bradbury" White, owing to his ascension to Australian #1 status, following the retirement of the four competitors in front of him. In March 2026, he won his 4th PSA title after securing victory in the Oceania World Championship Qualifiers during the 2025–26 PSA Squash Tour.

White is known for his love of the humble piccolo, and can often be found at the Parap Markets in his native Darwin, regaling his friends with stories of his squash wins.
