= Toby Tse =

Hong Kong squash player (born 2004)

Personal information
- Nationality: Hong Kong, Chinese
- Born: 18 October 2004 (age 21) Hong Kong, China

Sport
- Turned pro: 2020
- Retired: Active

Women's singles
- Highest ranking: No. 62 (April 2026)
- Current ranking: No. 62 (April 2026)
- Title: 7
Medal record
Women's squash
Representing Hong Kong
Asian Games
| Silver medal – second place | 2026 Aichi–Nagoya | Mixed doubles |

Toby Tse, also known as Tse Yee Lam (born 18 October 2004), is a Hong Kong professional squash player. She reached a career high ranking of 85 in the world during May 2025.

== Career ==
Tse won the 2022 Shepparton International. In May 2025, Tse won her fourth, fifth and sixth PSA titles in quick succession after securing victory in the Mozart Open, Guilfoyle Classic and South Australian Open during the 2024–25 PSA Squash Tour. The three title wins propelled her into the world's top 100 for the first time.

After winning the Asian World Championship Qualifying Event during the 2025–26 PSA Squash Tour, she hit a career world ranking of 62.
