= Khaled Labib =

Egyptian squash player (born 1997)

Personal information
- Born: 3 January 1997 (age 29) Cairo

Sport
- Racquet used: Technifiber
- Highest ranking: 84 (September 2022)
- Current ranking: 84 (September 2022)
- Updated on 26 September 2022

Khaled Labib (born 3 January 1997) is an Egyptian professional squash player who currently plays for Egypt men's national squash team.

He achieved his career-high PSA singles ranking of 84 in September 2022.
