= Alison Thomson =

Scottish professional squash player (born 1996)

Personal information
- Nationality: British
- Born: 3 May 1996 (age 30) Twickenham, England
- Height: 168 cm (5 ft 6 in)
- Weight: 60 kg (132 lb)

Sport
- Handedness: Right Handed
- Turned pro: 2013
- Coached by: Kylie Lindsay, Paul Bell
- Retired: Active
- Racquet used: Tecnifibre

Women's singles
- Highest ranking: No. 65 (September 2017)
- Current ranking: No. 85 (October 2024)
- Tour final: 1
Medal record
Representing Scotland
National Championships
Gold medal – first place	2023	singles

Alison Thomson (born 3 May 1996) is an English-born professional squash player who represented Scotand at the Commonwealth Games. She achieved a career-high ranking of 65 in September 2017.

== Biography ==
By January 2020, she had reached the ranking of number 2 in Scotland and 73 in the world, and competed in 65 professional tournaments. She has regularly played in the Premier Squash League.

She has also represented Scotland in international competitions including representing the Scottish team at the 2018 Commonwealth Games in the Gold Coast, Australia, where she competed in the singles and women's doubles events.

Thomson won the 2023 national singles at the Scottish National Squash Championships.
