= Gabriel Olufunmilayo =

Nigerian squash player

Personal information
- Born: May 12, 2000 (age 26) Lagos, Nigeria
- Height: 185 cm (6 ft 1 in)
- Weight: 68 kg (150 lb)

Sport
- Country: Nigeria
- Handedness: Right-handed
- Turned pro: 2019
- Racquet used: Tecnifibre

Men's singles
- Highest ranking: No. 138 (28 July 2025)
- Current ranking: No. 138
- Title: 3
- Tour final: 4
- Updated on 23 August 2025

Gabriel Olufunmilayo (born 12 May 2000 in Lagos) is a Nigerian professional squash player. He is currently ranked No. 138 in the world and No. 2 in Nigeria, behind Onaopemipo Adegoke. He has won multiple national titles and competes internationally on the PSA World Tour.

== Career ==
Olufunmilayo joined the Professional Squash Association (PSA) in 2019. In 2025, he began competing in international tournaments across North America, including the Manitoba Open, Lethbridge Pro-Am, Rochester Pro-Am, and Maspeth Welding Steel Court Championship. His participation was supported by the John Hett Sports Foundation.

In July 2025, he reached the semifinals of the Maspeth Welding Steel Court Championship in New York, defeating Valeriy Fedoruk and Ali El Toukhy before falling to Onaopemipo Adegoke.

Domestically, Olufunmilayo has won the men's singles title at the 3rd Vitrano Squash Closed Satellite Tournament in Lagos, defeating Abel Shedrack 3–0 in the final.

In November 2024, he overcame injury to win the Abuja Squash Open, showcasing resilience and tactical prowess.

He also reached the finals of the Prime Atlantic Squash tournament in Lagos, defeating Suliamon Faruq 3–0 in the semifinals before facing Samuel Kehinde in the final.

Earlier in the year, he was runner-up at the inaugural Mailafia Memorial Men’s Open Tournament in Abuja, retiring due to injury in the final against Samuel Kehinde.

Olufunmilayo has expressed a strong desire to compete in more international tournaments to improve his PSA ranking and challenge for the top spot in Nigeria.

== Achievements ==
- PSA World Ranking: No. 138 (as of July 2025)
- Nigerian National Ranking: No. 2 (as of August 2025)
- Titles: Prime Atlantic Squash Open (2024), Vitrano Squash Satellite (2024), Abuja Squash Open (2024)
