= Finnlay Withington =

English squash player (born 2004)

Personal information
- Nationality: British (English)
- Born: 3 April 2004 (age 22) Bury, England
- Years active: 6

Sport
- Turned pro: 2021
- Coached by: Josh Taylor
- Retired: Active
- Racquet used: Dunlop

Men's singles
- Highest ranking: No. 64 (April 2026)
- Current ranking: No. 64 (April 2026)
- Title: 5

Finnlay Withington (born 3 April 2004) is an English professional squash player. He reached a career high ranking of 64 in the world during April 2026.

== Biography ==
Withington came to prominence after winning the 2022 WSF Men's World Junior Team Championship title, the first English success for 22 years. The team consisting of Withington, Sam Osborne-Wylde and Jonah Bryant defeated Egypt in the final.

He won the 2023 David Lloyd open. In March 2026, he won his fourth PSA title after securing victory in the Club Atwater's Centennial Championship during the 2025–26 PSA Squash Tour and quickly followed up with a fifth title when winning the RC Pro Series in April.
