= Cheng Nga Ching =

Hong Kong squash player (born 2000)

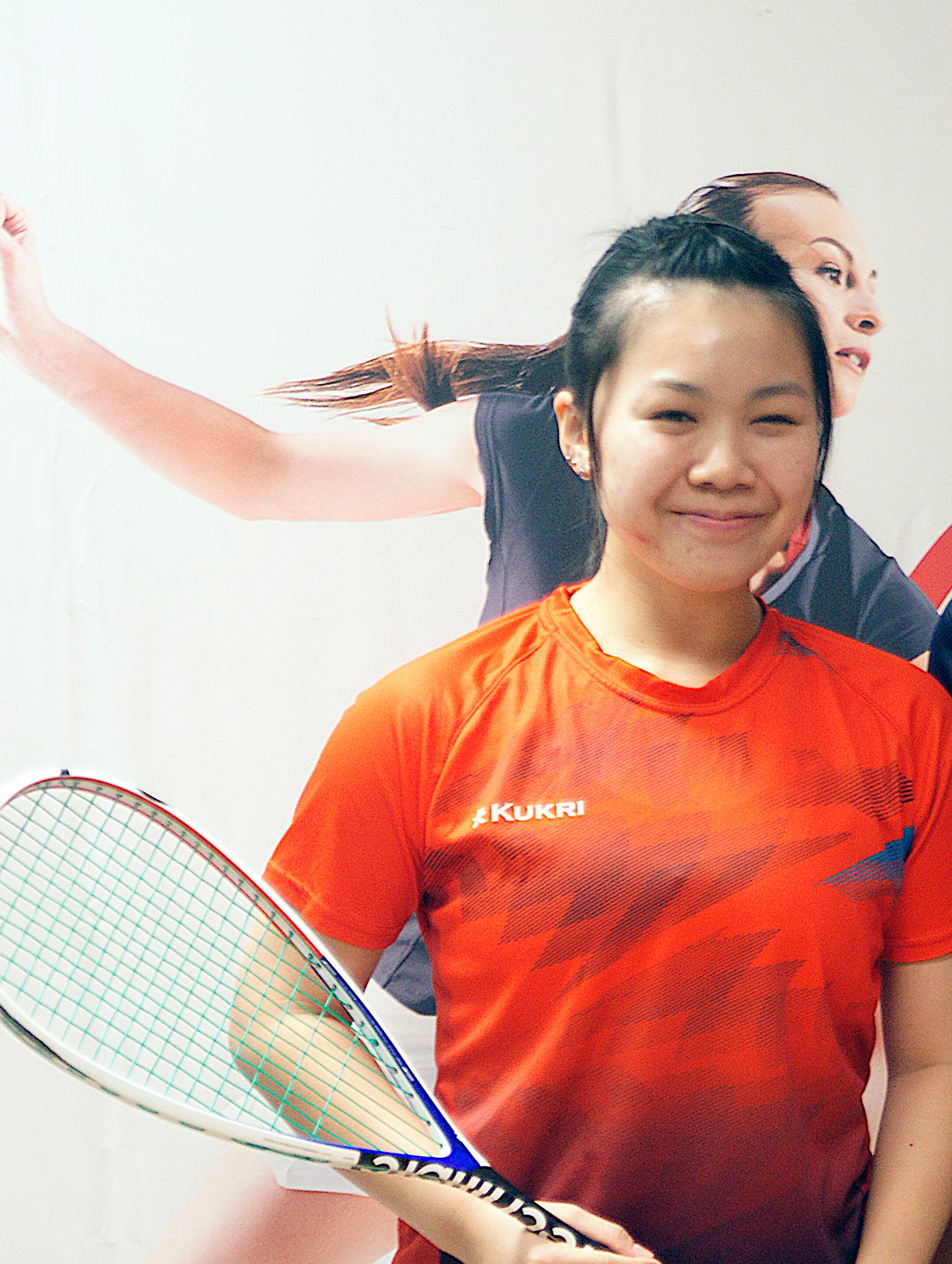
- Cheng Nga Ching, Monte-Carlo Squash Classic 2023

Personal information
- Born: January 24, 2000 (age 26) Hong Kong
- Education: The Hong Kong Polytechnic University

Sport
- Country: Hong Kong
- Turned pro: 2020
- Retired: Active

Women's singles
- Highest ranking: No. 60 (April 2024)
- Current ranking: No. 65 (December 2024)
- Updated on April 2023

Cheng Nga Ching (Chinese: 鄭雅晴; born 24 January 2000 in Hong Kong) is a Hong Kong professional squash player. As of December 2021, she was ranked number 191 in the world. She won the 2021 KCC PSA Challenge Cup.
