= Seif Shenawy =

Egyptian squash player (born 2001)

Personal information
- Born: 9 September 2001 (age 24) Cairo, Egypt
- Height: 188
- Weight: 94

Sport
- Country: Egypt
- Handedness: Right-handed
- Turned pro: 2018
- Coached by: Mohamed Reda
- Retired: Active
- Racquet used: Tecnifibre

Men's singles
- Highest ranking: No. 76 (March 2023)
- Current ranking: No. 74 (March 2023)
- Updated on October 2022

Seif Shenawy (born 9 September 2001, in Cairo) is an Egyptian professional squash player.

Coached by Karim Darwish and Omar Abdel Aziz, he reached his career-high ranking of World No. 74 on 29 January 2024. He won the 2022 Burnt Open.
