= Olatunji Busayo =

Professional Nigerian Squash Player

Personal information
- Full name: Olatunji Busayo Mary
- Born: 12 June 1999 (age 27)
- Height: 163 cm (5 ft 4 in)
- Weight: 75Kg

Sport
- Country: Nigeria
- Handedness: Right Handed
- Turned pro: 2018
- Coached by: Yemisi Olatunji
- Racquet used: Harrow
- Highest ranking: 141 (April 2024)
- Current ranking: 210 (October 2026)
Medal record
Women's Squash
Representing Nigeria
National Championships
Gold medal – first place	2022 Ogun	Singles
Silver medal – second place	2023 Ogun	Singles
Silver medal – second place	2024 Ogun	Singles
PSA Challengers Tour
Gold medal – first place	2024 Lagos	Singles
Gold medal – first place	2023 Lagos	Singles

Olatunji Busayo Mary (born 12 June 1999) is a professional squash player from Ekiti State, Nigeria. She is the 2020 and 2022 Nigeria Squash Champion. She reached a career high ranking of 141 in the world during April 2024.

== Professional squash career ==
Since turning pro, Busayo participated in numerous WSF and PSA tournaments, including the Lagos Prime Atlantic Squash Open, Yellow Dots Squash Open, Namibia Squash Open, Lagos State Squash Classics, and the HE Chief Olusegun Obasanjo National Squash Championship,

In October 2024, Busayo won her 2nd PSA title after securing victory in the John Hett Sports Foundation Open during the 2024–25 PSA Squash Tour.

== Tournaments and titles ==
Major Tournaments (64)

Major tournaments include:

- PSA World Championship Qualifiers
- PSA World Tour
- WSF & PSA National Championships

Year/Season	Tournament	Level	Draw	Position
2018	Lagos International Squash Classic	W 5	Main draw	Last 16
2018	Chamberlain Squash Open	W 10	Main draw	Last 16
2018	Prime Atlantic Squash Open	WSF & PSA Satellite	Main draw	Runner-up
2019	1st Cargolux Merchant Express Professional Squash Tournament	WSF & PSA Satellite	Main draw	Runner-up
2019	1st Lekan Adewoye National Squash Open	WSF & PSA Satellite	Main draw	Runner-up
2019	1st Apapa Club Squash Open	WSF & PSA Satellite	Main draw	Runner-up
2019	HE Chief Olusegun Obasanjo Squash Open	WSF & PSA Satellite	Main draw	Runner-up
2019	1st Frigate National Open	WSF & PSA Satellite	Main draw	Runner-up
2021	Wisers Squash Open 2021	WSF & PSA Satellite	Main draw	Runner-up
2022	Vitrano Open	WSF & PSA Satellite	Main draw	Runner-up
2022	Siciliano Antoinette Open	WSF & PSA Satellite	Main draw	Winner
2022	Wiser Open Satellite	WSF & PSA Satellite	Main draw	Winner
2022	Frigate National Squash Open	WSF & PSA Satellite	Main draw	Runner-up
2022	HE Chief Olusegun Obasanjo National Squash Championship	WSF & PSA National Championships	Main draw	Runner-up
2022	1st Headwaters Squash Open	WSF & PSA Satellite	Main draw	Runner-up
2022	1st Anayi Egbeita Squash Open	WSF & PSA Satellite	Main draw	Runner-up
2023	Lagos State Squash Classic	PSA Challenger Tour 5	Main draw	Semifinalist
2023	2nd Vitrano Satellite	WSF & PSA Satellite	Main draw	Runner-up
2023	Shah Satellite	WSF & PSA Satellite	Main draw	Winner
2023	RSA Open Squash Tournament	WSF & PSA Satellite	Main draw	Winner
2023	Namibian Open	PSA Challenger Tour 3	Main draw	Quarterfinalist
2023	Abuja Squash Open	WSF & PSA Satellite	Main draw	Runner-up
2024	Yellow Dots Squash Open	PSA Challenger Tour 3	Main draw	Winner
2024	The Bee-Clean Edmonton Squash Club Women's Open	PSA Challenger Tour 9	Main draw	Last 32
2023-2024	2023-2024 World Championship Qualifying Event, Africa	PSA World Championship Qualifier	Main draw	Last 16
2024	Lagos State - Prime Atlantic Squash Open	WSF & PSA Satellite	Main draw	Runner-up
2024	HE Chief Olusegun Obasanjo National Squash Championship	WSF & PSA National Championships	Main draw	Runner-up
2024	4th Edition Annual PSA Merchant Express Global Cargo and Turkish Cargo Airline	WSF & PSA National Championships	Main draw	Winner
2024	2nd John Hett Sports Foundation Squash Open	WSF & PSA National Championships	Main draw	Winner
2025	UWE Perfromance Sport Satelite	WSF & PSA Satelite	Main draw	Quarter Finalist
2025	Charing Cross Classic, Hammersfield	WSF & PSA Satelite	Main Draw	Semi Finalist
2025	East Glos Open(Senior)	WSF & PSA Satelitte	Main draw	Last 16
2025	Squash On Fire Open, Washington	PSA Challenger Tour	Main draw	Last 16
2025	The Hyder Trophy, New York City	PSA Challenger Tour	Main draw	Last 32
2025	Guilfoyle PSA Squash Classic, Toronto	PSA Challenger Tour	Main draw	Last 16
2025	Maspeth Welding Steel Court Championship, New York City	PSA Challenger Tour	Main draw	Last 16
2025	HE Chief Olusegun Obasanjo National Squash Championship	WSF & PSA National Championship	Main draw	Runner Up
2025	Squash Federation of Africa Senior Championship, Uganda, Team		Main draw	Silver
2025	The New York Open	PSA Challenger Tour	Main draw	Quarter Finalist
2026	Squash On Fire Open	PSA Challenger Tour	Main draw	Quarter Finalist
2026	Bee Squash Expression Open, Springfield, Massachusetts	PSA Challenger Tour	Main draw	Quarter Finalist
2026	T-Frorce Pro Challenger Series, Philadelphia	PSA Challenger Tour	Main draw	Quarter Finalist
2026	K2 Squash Womens Challenger	PSA Challenger	Main draw	Quarter Finalist
2026	Woodruff-Nee Trophy		Main draw	Quarter Finalist
2026	Open De Quebec	PSA Challenger Tour	Main draw	Runner Up
