= Sarah Cardwell =

Australian squash player (born 1991)

Personal information
- Born: 10 October 1991 (age 34) Melbourne, Australia

Sport
- Country: Australia
- Handedness: Right Handed
- Turned pro: 2008
- Coached by: Vicki Cardwell
- Retired: Active
- Racquet used: Karakal

Women's singles
- Highest ranking: No. 41 (February 2017)
- Current ranking: No. 79 (September 2024)
- Title: 3
- Tour final: 4
Medal record
Women's squash
Representing Australia
World Doubles Championships
Silver medal – second place	2019 Carrara	Doubles
- Updated on September 2024

Sarah Cardwell (born 10 October 1991 in Melbourne) is an Australian professional squash player. She reached a career-high world ranking of World No. 41 in February 2017.
