= Katerina Tycova =

German professional squash player (born 1999)

Personal information
- Born: 16 May 1999 (age 27) Harlaching, Germany
- Height: 169 cm (5 ft 7 in)

Sport
- Country: Germany
- Handedness: Tecnifibre
- Coached by: Patrick Bezdek, Christian Radeke
- Retired: Active
- Racquet used: 2020

Women's singles
- Highest ranking: No. 90 (May 2023)
- Current ranking: No. 115 (August 2025)
- Updated on August 2025

Katerina Tycova (born 16 May 1999 in Harlaching) is a German professional squash player. As of September 2022, she was ranked number 105 in the world. She won the 2022 Madeira International tournament. She has represented Germany and has been accepted as a squash player into the Bundeswehr.
