= Saskia Beinhard =

German squash player (born 1999)

Personal information
- Born: 2 March 1999 (age 27) Munich, Germany

Sport
- Country: Germany
- Turned pro: 2020
- Retired: Active
- Racquet used: Dunlop

Women's singles
- Highest ranking: No. 64 (December 2022)
- Current ranking: No. 64 (December 2022)
- Updated on April 2021

Saskia Beinhard (born 2 March 1999 in Munich) is a German professional squash player. As of December 2022, she was ranked number 64 in the world.

In 2020, she won the German Nationals, defeating Franziska Hennes in the final.
