= Ben Smith (squash player) =

English squash player (born 2002)

Personal information
- Born: 15 May 2002 (age 24) Grimsby, England

Sport
- Country: England
- Turned pro: 2019
- Retired: Active
- Racquet used: Tecnifibre

Men's singles
- Highest ranking: No. 68 (May 2024)
- Current ranking: No. 87 (May 2025)
- Title: 4
Medal record
Men's squash
Representing England
European Team Championships
Gold medal – first place	2024 Uster	Team

Ben Smith (born 15 May 2002) is an English professional squash player. He reached a career high ranking of 68 in the world during May 2024.

== Biography ==
Smith, born in Grimsby, England, won his maiden PSA title at the 2022 Breda Open. He then secured victory in three PSA titles during the 2022–23 PSA World Tour, winning the Swiss Open, Romanian Open and Liverpool Cricket Club Open.

In 2024, Smith was part of the England team that won the 2024 European Team Championships in Switzerland.
