= Bryan Lim Tze Kang =

Malaysian squash player (born 1996)

Personal information
- Born: February 1, 1996 (age 30) Seremban, Malaysia

Sport
- Country: Malaysia
- Handedness: Right Handed
- Turned pro: 2015
- Coached by: Bradley Hindle
- Retired: Active
- Racquet used: Tecnifibre

Men's singles
- Highest ranking: No. 91 (March 2025)
- Current ranking: No. 127 (December 2025)
- Title: 5
- Updated on May 2021

Bryan Lim Tze Kang (born 1 February 1996 in Seremban) is a Malaysian professional squash player. As of April 2025, he was ranked number 94 in the world. He has won 5 PSA titles.
