= Rucphen =

- Municipality
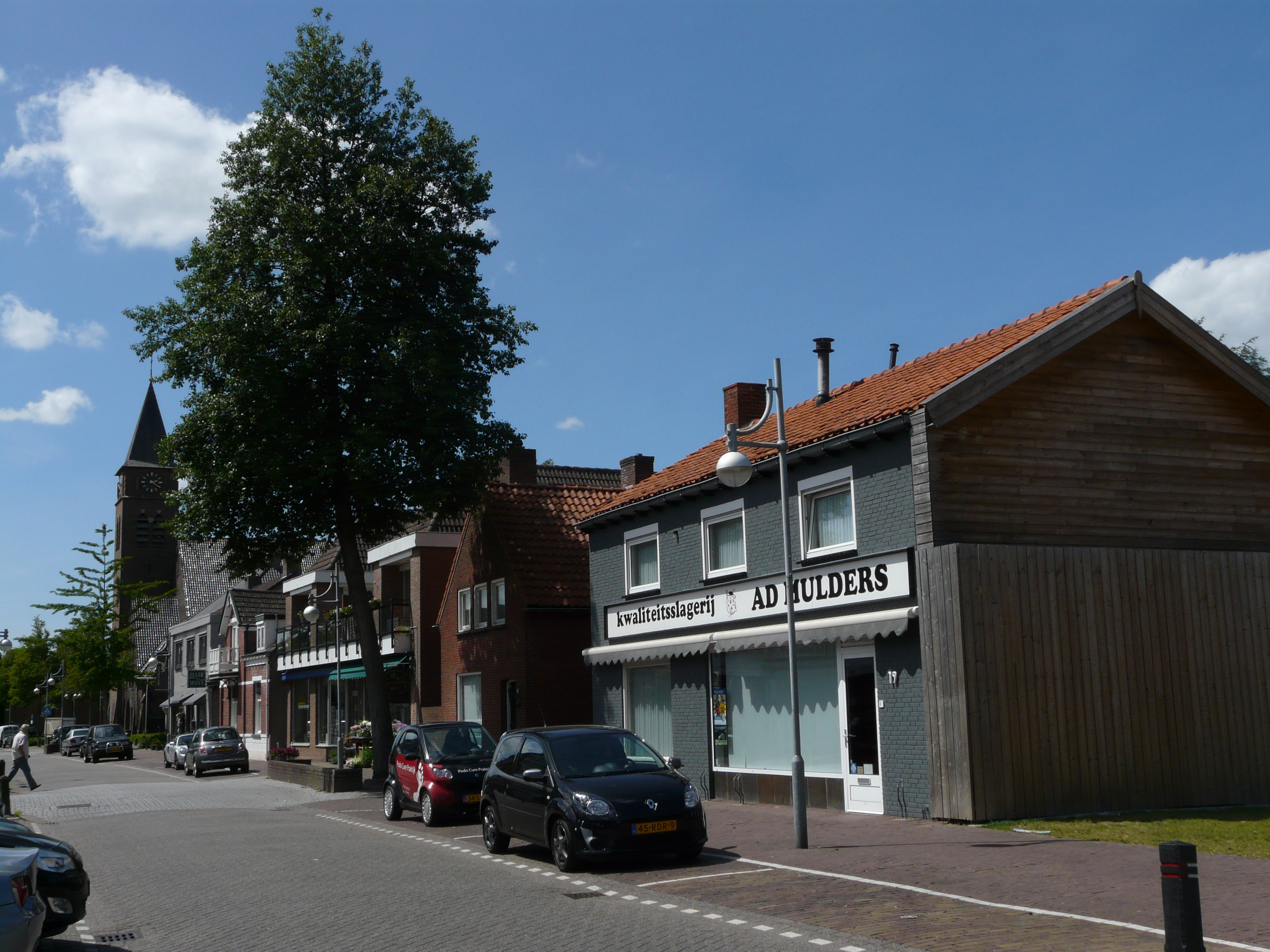
- Street through Rucphen

- Flag Coat of arms

- Location in North Brabant
- Coordinates: 51°32′N 4°35′E
- Country: Netherlands
- Province: North Brabant

Government
  - Body: Municipal council
  - Mayor: Marjolein van der Meer-Mohr (VVD)

Area
  - Total: 64.48 km^{2} (24.90 sq mi)
  - Land: 64.41 km^{2} (24.87 sq mi)
  - Water: 0.07 km^{2} (0.027 sq mi)
- Elevation: 10 m (33 ft)

Population (January 2021)
  - Total: 23,080
  - Density: 358/km^{2} (930/sq mi)
- Demonym: Rucphenaar
- Time zone: UTC+1 (CET)
  - Summer (DST): UTC+2 (CEST)
- Postcode: 4710–4722, 4735
- Area code: 0165
- Website: www.rucphen.nl

Rucphen (pronounced [ˈrʏkfə(n)]) is a municipality and a town in the southern Netherlands between Roosendaal and Etten-Leur, south of the railway, but without a train-station.

== Population centres ==
- Sint Willebrord ('t Heike) (pop.: 9,320)
- Sprundel (5,090)
- Rucphen (4,580)
- Zegge (2,210)
- Schijf (1,430)

=== Topography ===
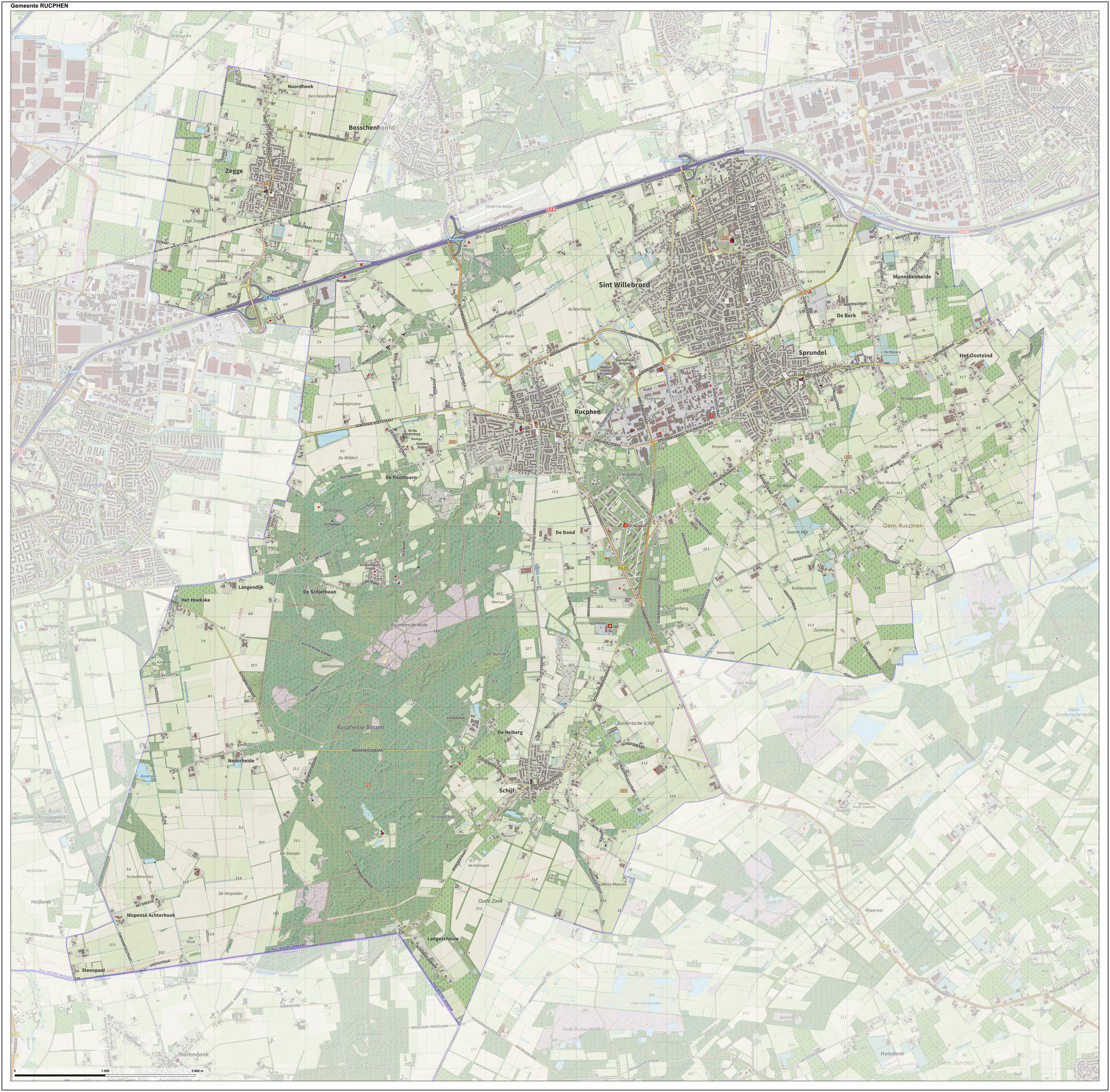

Dutch Topographic map of the municipality of Rucphen, June 2015

== History ==
In 1300-1350, there were 5 glories founded within the borders of current municipality Rucphen. They were: Sprundel-Nassau (1297), Langendijk (1354), Nieuw Doorlecht (1354), Rucven (1357) and Vorenseinde (1359). The current municipality was founded in 1810. Originally the name of the municipality was Sprundel, but later changed to Rucphen. On the night of 28-29 October 1944, Rucphen got freed from the Germans. In 1953 Sint Willebrord got absorbed into municipality Rucphen and Schijf in 1997.

== Demographics ==
As of 2025, Rucphen (the town) has 5.145 residents.

As demonstrated in the table below, the biggest age group of Rucphen are seniors.

Age distribution of Rucphen
Age group	Population	Percentage
0-15	715	13.9%
15-25	490	9.5%
25-45	1135	22.1%
45-65	1385	26.9%
65+	1415	27.5%

93,6% of residents of Rucphen are born in the Netherlands, 6,4% are foreign-born residents.

39,4% of foreign-born residents are born outside of Europe, 60,6% are born inside of Europe.

== Education ==
There are 3 schools in Rucphen; the Sint Martinusschool, an elementary school; Childcenter De Expeditie and Het Munnikenheide College, a middle school.

== Transportation ==
1 bus goes through Rucphen, bus 162. Bus 162 goes from Tolberg, a neighborhood in Roosendaal to Etten-Leur.

== Notable people ==
- Hendrik Detmers (1761 in Sprundel – 1825) a Dutch general in the Battle of Waterloo
- Dick Jaspers (born 1965 in Sint Willebrord) a Dutch professional carom billiards player
- John Kerstens (born 1965 in Zegge) a Dutch politician and former trade union leader
- Donny Gorter (born 1988) a Dutch professional footballer with over 200 club caps
- Tessa ter Sluis (born 1995 in Sint Willebrord) a Dutch professional squash player

== Gallery ==
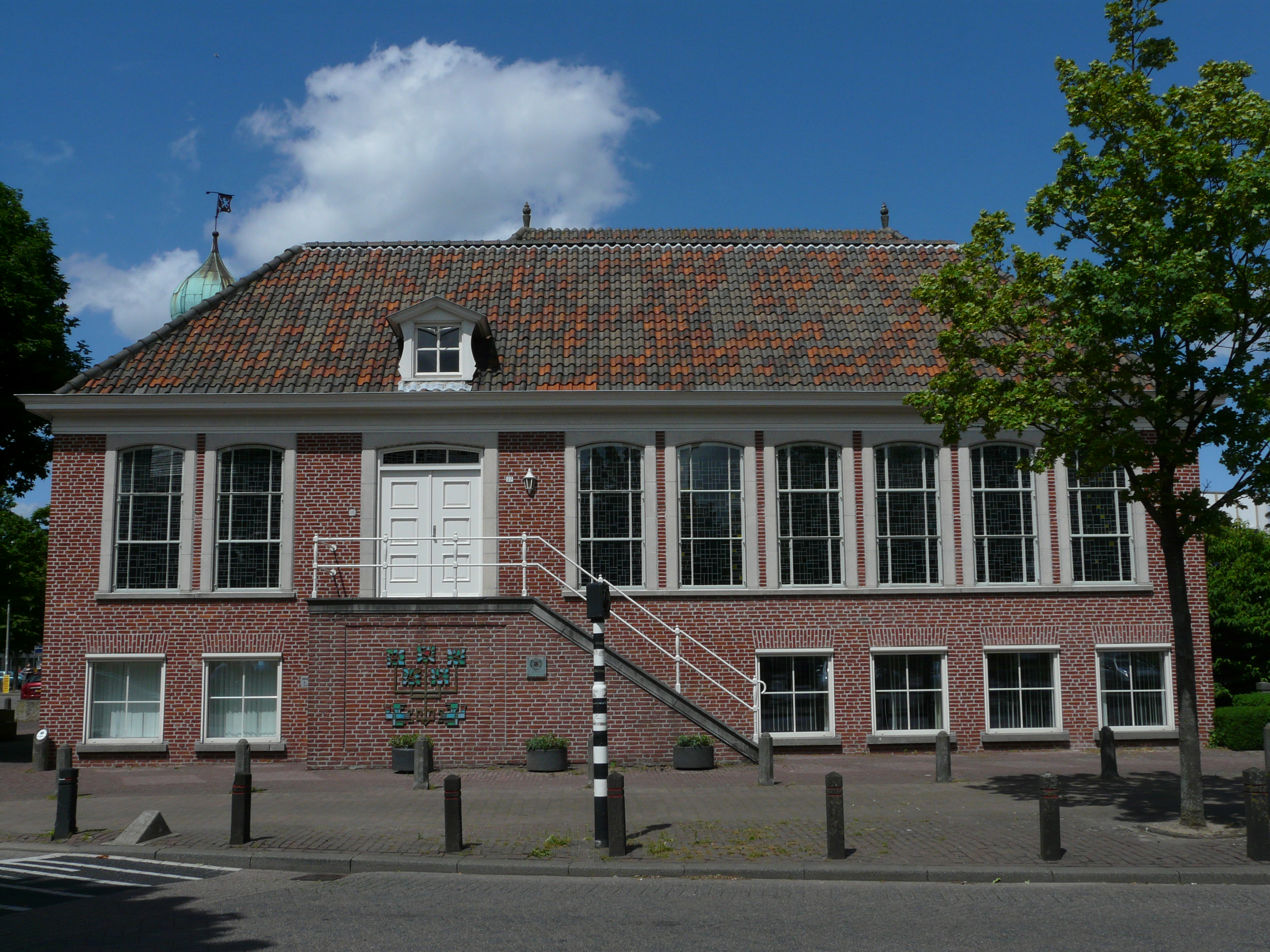
Oude Raadhuis van Rucphen

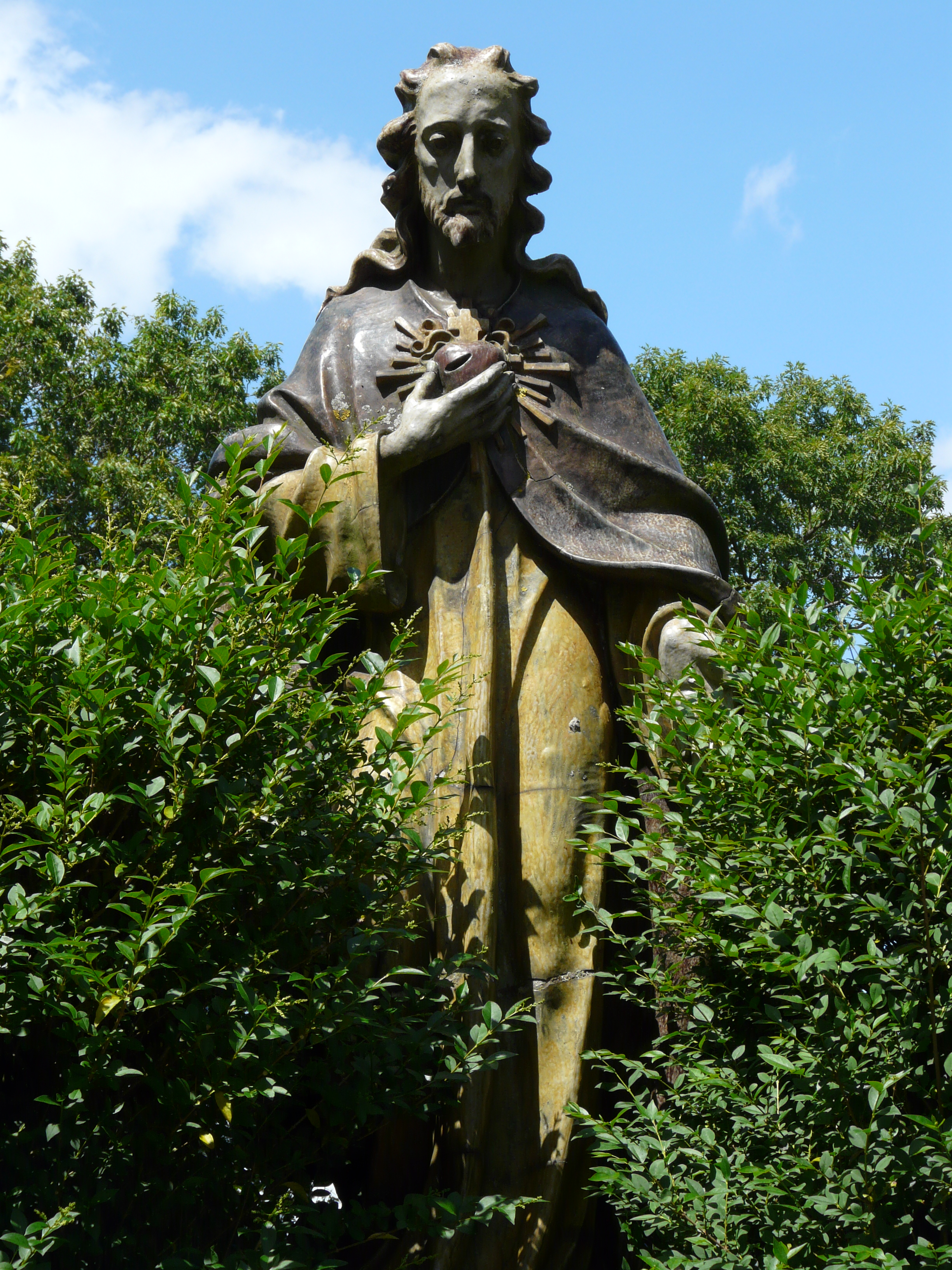
Heilig Hartbeeld aan de zijkant van de Martinuskerk in Rucphen

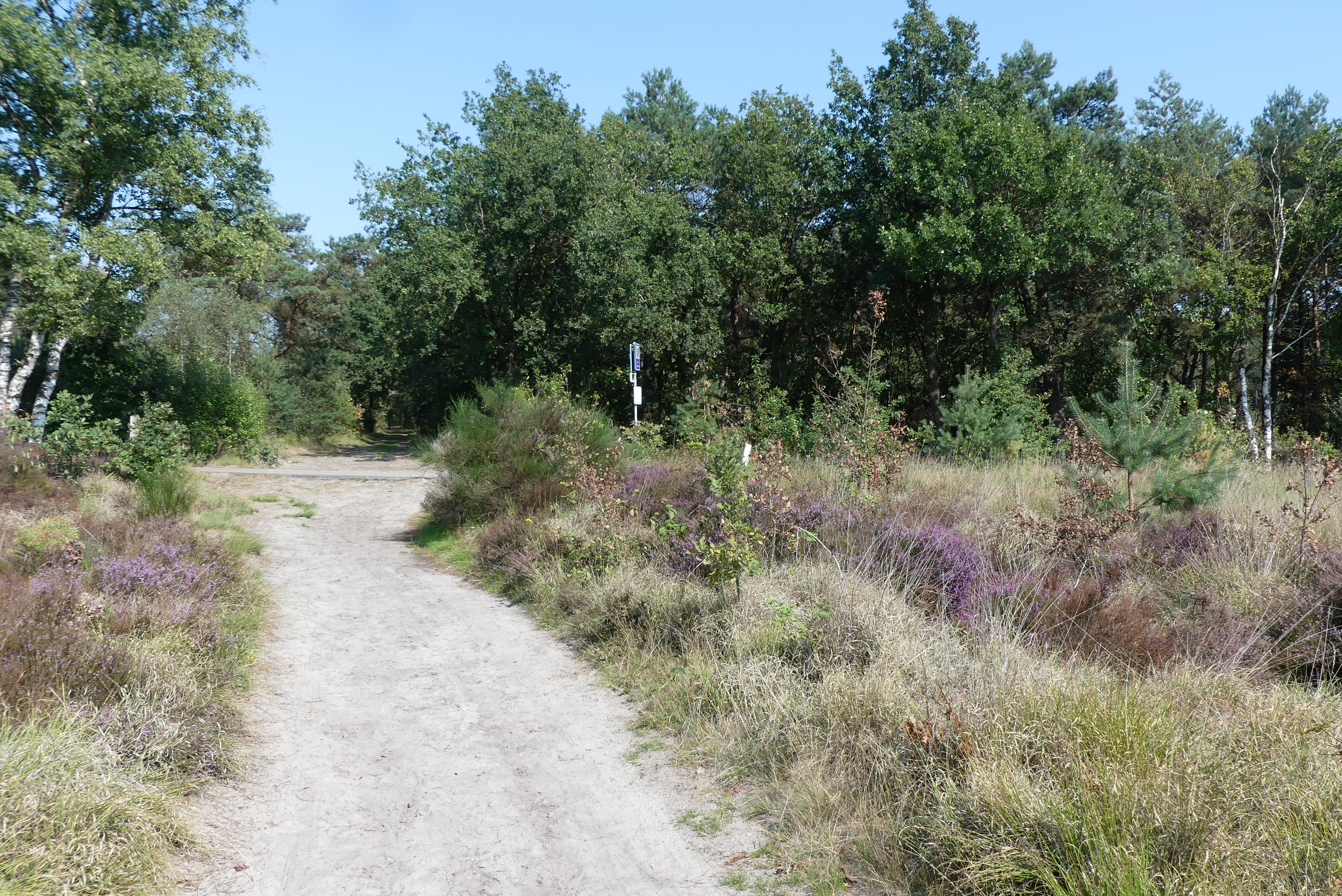
Rucphense Heide

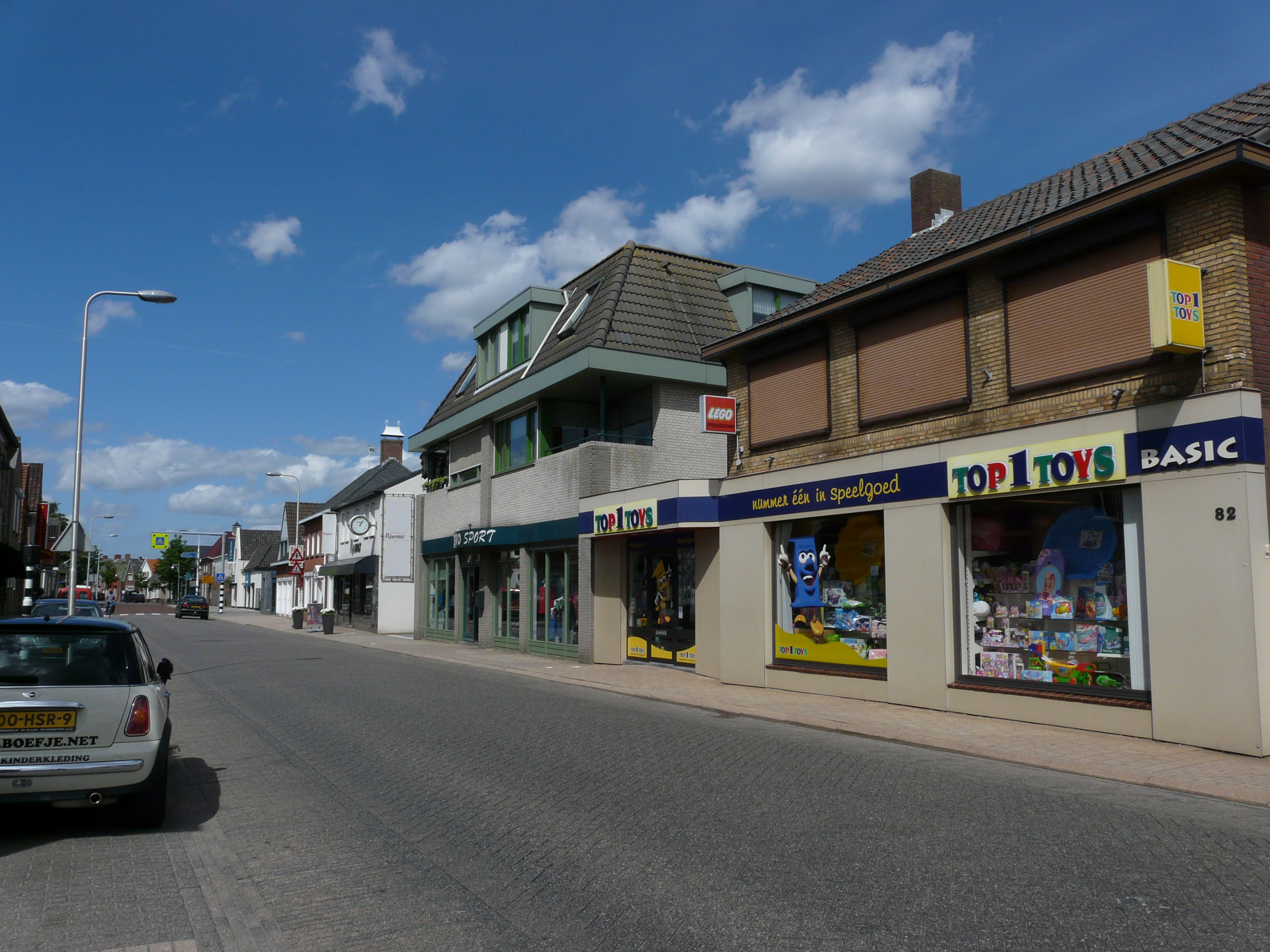
Dorpsstraat in Sint Willebrord

== See also ==
- Heikant, Rucphen
