= Heikant, Rucphen =

Coordinates: 51°31′47″N 4°37′39″E

Heikant is a hamlet in the municipality of Rucphen, in the Dutch province of North Brabant. It is located about 2 km southeast of Sprundel.
