= Tessa ter Sluis =

Dutch squash player (born 1995)

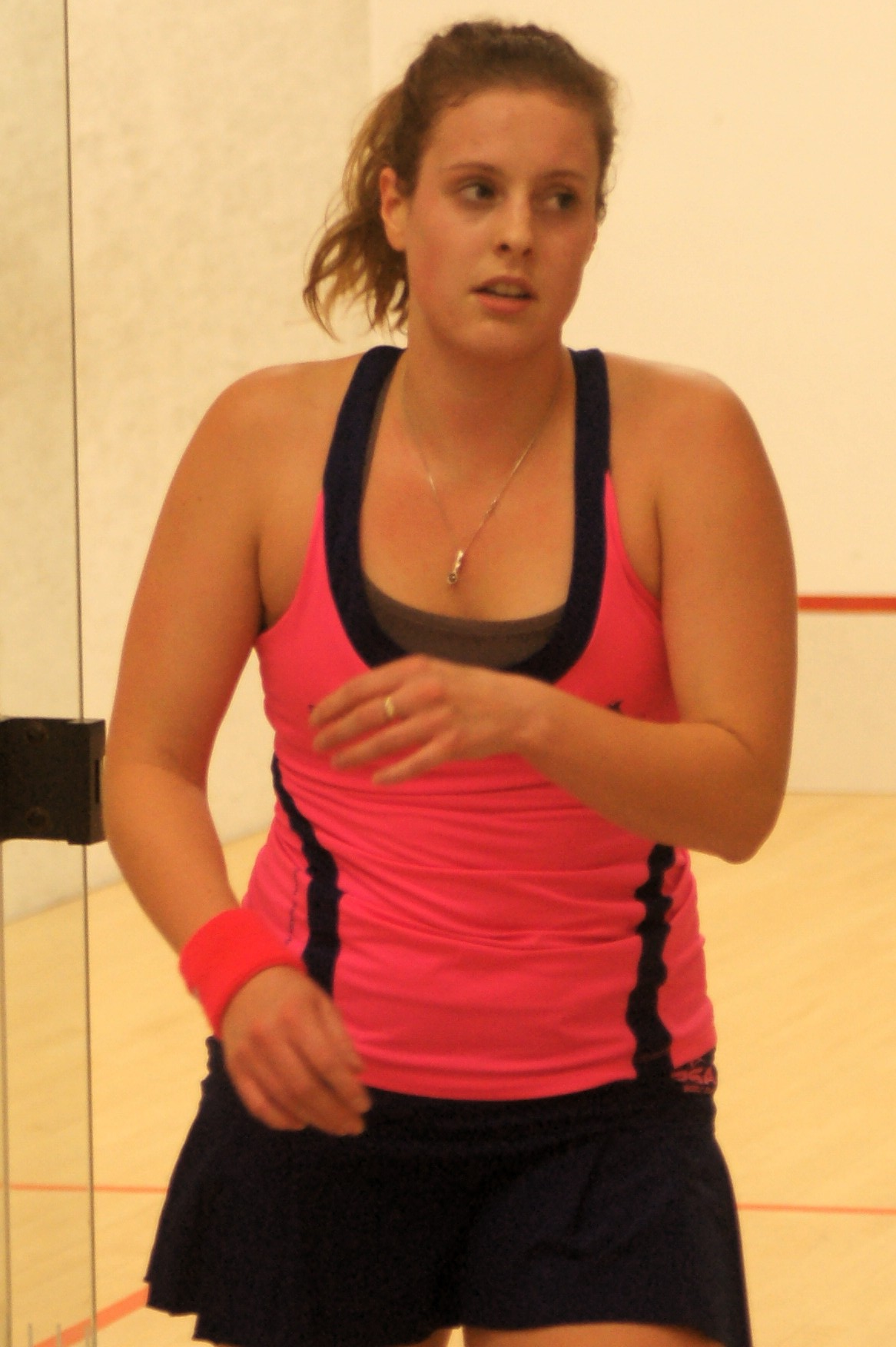

Personal information
- Born: January 16, 1995 (age 31) Sint Willebrord, Netherlands
- Education: Johan Cruyff University
- Website: www.tessatersluis.com

Sport
- Country: Netherlands
- Handedness: Right Handed
- Turned pro: 2018
- Retired: Active
- Racquet used: Opfeel

Women's singles
- Highest ranking: No. 56 (March 2022)
- Current ranking: No. 73 (November 2022)
- Title: Dutch National Champion 2017
- Updated on November, 2022

Tessa ter Sluis (born 16 January 1995 in Sint Willebrord) is a Dutch professional squash player. As of March 2022, she is ranked number 62 in the world. The highest ranking of her career is number 56. She has been in the Netherlands women's national squash team since 2014.

== Education ==
ter Sluis went to RSG t' Rijks to get her VWO high school diploma. Whilst she started playing on the PSA World Tour in 2014, she decided to study for a few more years. She studied Sportmarketing at the Johan Cruyff University, a hbo programme set up for athletes. In 2018 she got her degree and she went on to play on the tour full time.

== Squash career ==
ter Sluis started playing squash at the age of 8. Together with her brother she started to train and play junior tournaments. She loved playing squash and chose to only play squash. From there she played national and international events. Won many national junior titles and even got selected for the European and world championships.

In 2014, she started playing on the PSA world tour, previously known as WISPA. In that same year she got selected for the women's national team for the first time.

ter Sluis is currently sponsored by multiple companies, such as VitOrtho voedingssupplementen, BRESS breda, Houtrust Squash and Decathlon Nederland.

In 2017 Tessa won her first Dutch national championship. In 2025 she reclaimed her title for the second time.
