= John Kerstens =

Dutch politician

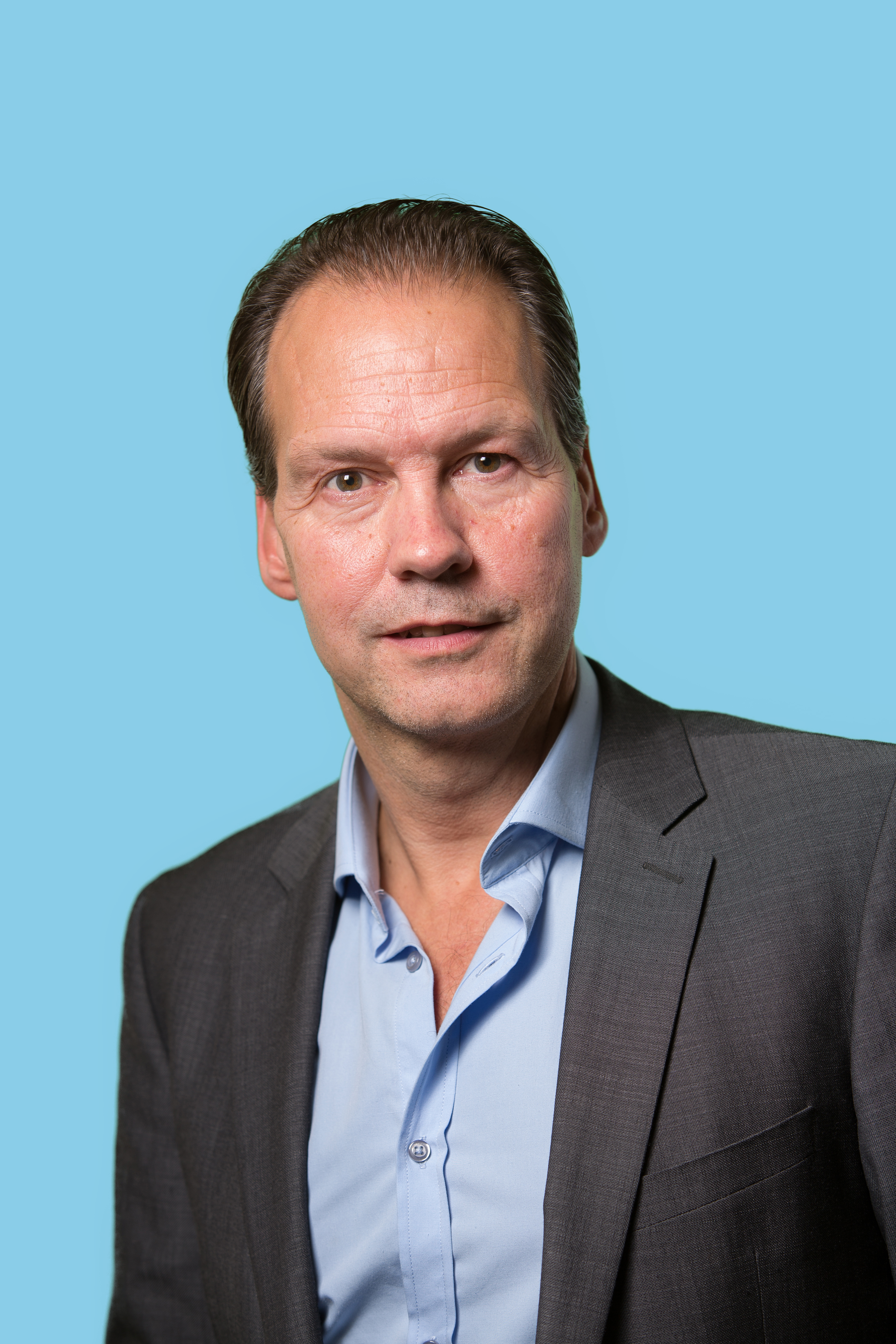
- John Kerstens in 2016

Member of the House of Representatives
- In office 20 September 2012 – 23 March 2017

Personal details
- Born: Johannes Wilhelmus Maria Kerstens; 20 January 1965 (age 61) Zegge, Netherlands
- Party: Labour Party
- Education: Tilburg University

Johannes Wilhelmus Maria "John" Kerstens (born 20 January 1965) is a Dutch politician and former trade union leader. As a member of the Labour Party (Partij van de Arbeid) he was an MP between 20 September 2012 and 23 March 2017.

Kerstens was vice president of the Federation Dutch Labour Movement (Federatie Nederlandse Vakbeweging) and president of affiliate union FNV Construction (FNV Bouw).

Kerstens studied law at Tilburg University. He has one daughter and a younger son and he lives in Arnhem.
