= Sprundel =

- Village
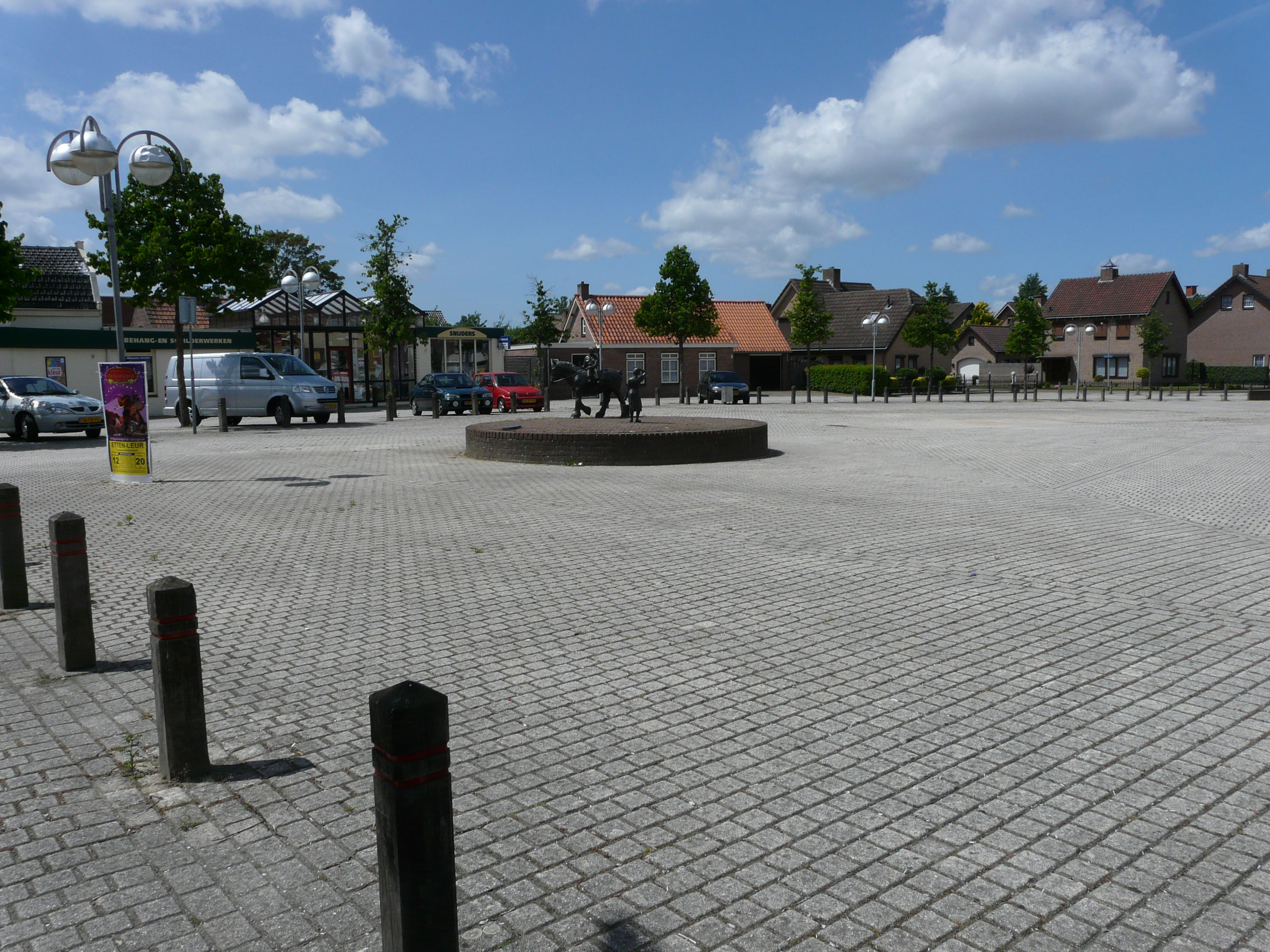
- Village square

- Location in the province of North Brabant in the Netherlands Sprundel (Netherlands)
- Coordinates: 51°32′11″N 4°35′46″E
- Country: Netherlands
- Province: North Brabant
- Municipality: Rucphen

Area
  - Total: 15.81 km^{2} (6.10 sq mi)
- Elevation: 11 m (36 ft)

Population (2025)
  - Total: 5,350
  - Density: 338/km^{2} (876/sq mi)
- Time zone: UTC+1 (CET)
  - Summer (DST): UTC+2 (CEST)
- Postal code: 4714
- Dialing code: 0165

Sprundel is a village in the southern Netherlands, in the Rucphen municipality. In the past it was the main village of the region, with roads to Roosendaal to the west, Breda to the east, Rotterdam to the north and Antwerp to the south.

== History ==
The village was first mentioned in Castellum Sprundelheim 992 and after 1282 as "Hermano filio Nekers de Sprundele". The etymology is unknown. Sprundel developed in the Middle Ages on a stream ridge. The village was abandoned in 1583 when Charles de Gontaut, duc de Biron was plundering the area. It was resettled around 1592.

The St John the Baptist Church was built in 1922. The 16th-century tower from the earlier church was retained. The grist mill De Hoop was built in 1840. By 1960, the wind mill was in a very poor condition. It was bought by the municipality in 1972 and extensively repaired between 1976 and 1977. It is frequently in service. On the night of 28-29 October, 1944 Sprundel got freed from the Germans.

== Demographics ==
Sprundel was home to 390 people in 1840. Since then that amount has been increased to 5,350.

As demonstrated in the table below, the biggest age group of Sprundel are middle-aged adults (aged 45-65).

Age distribution of Sprundel
Age group	Population	Percentage
0-15	755	14.1%
15-25	500	9.3%
25-45	1230	23%
45-65	1615	30.2%
65+	1250	23.4%

93,5% of residents are born in the Netherlands, 6,5% are foreign-born residents.

42,9% of foreign-born residents are from outside of Europe, 57,1% are from inside of Europe.

== Facilities ==
There is 1 elementary school, De Vinkenbos.

There is also a dentist and a pharmacy in Sprundel. Supermarkets are only in Sint Willebrord and Rucphen.

== Gallery ==
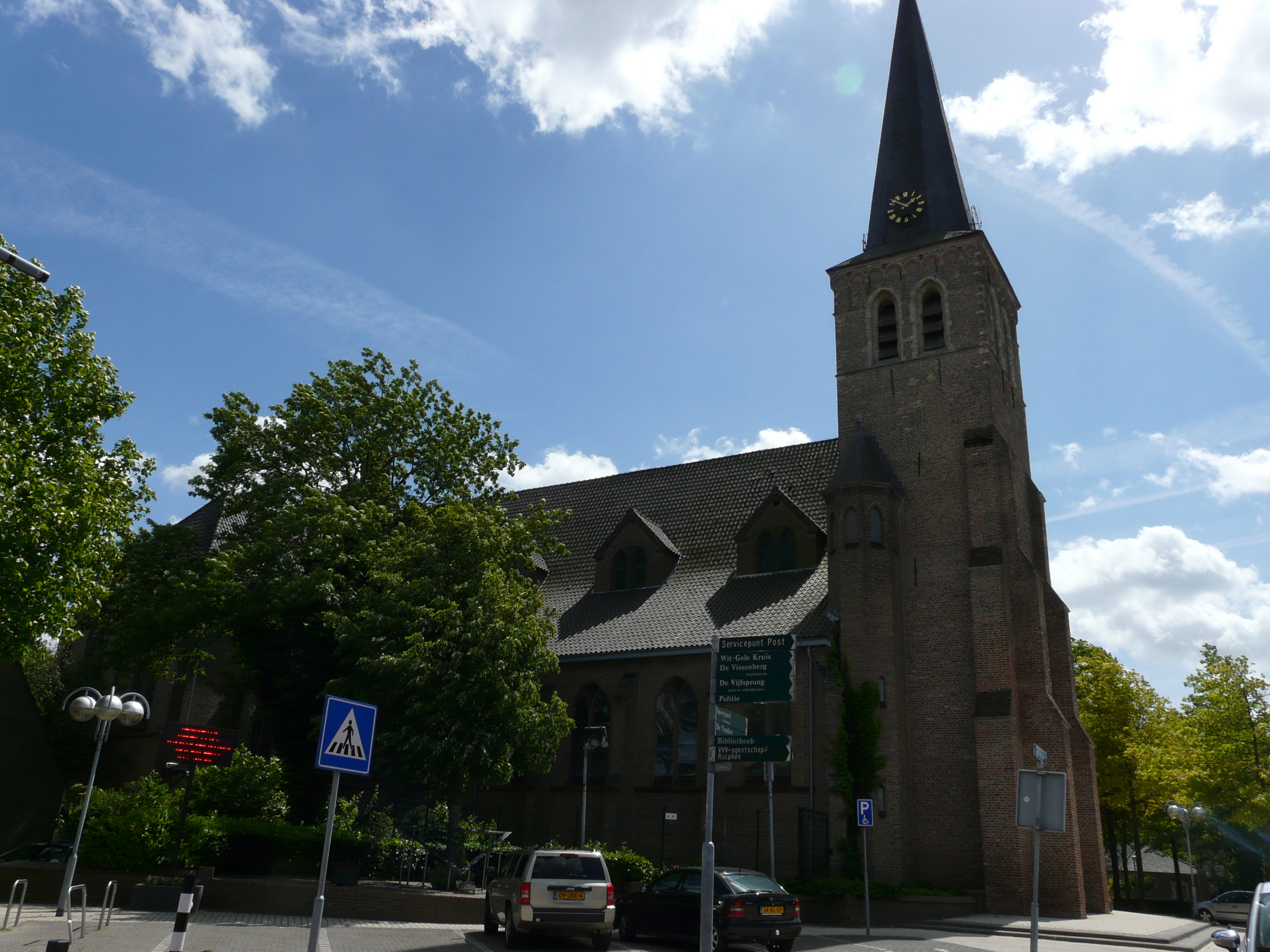
St John the Baptist Church

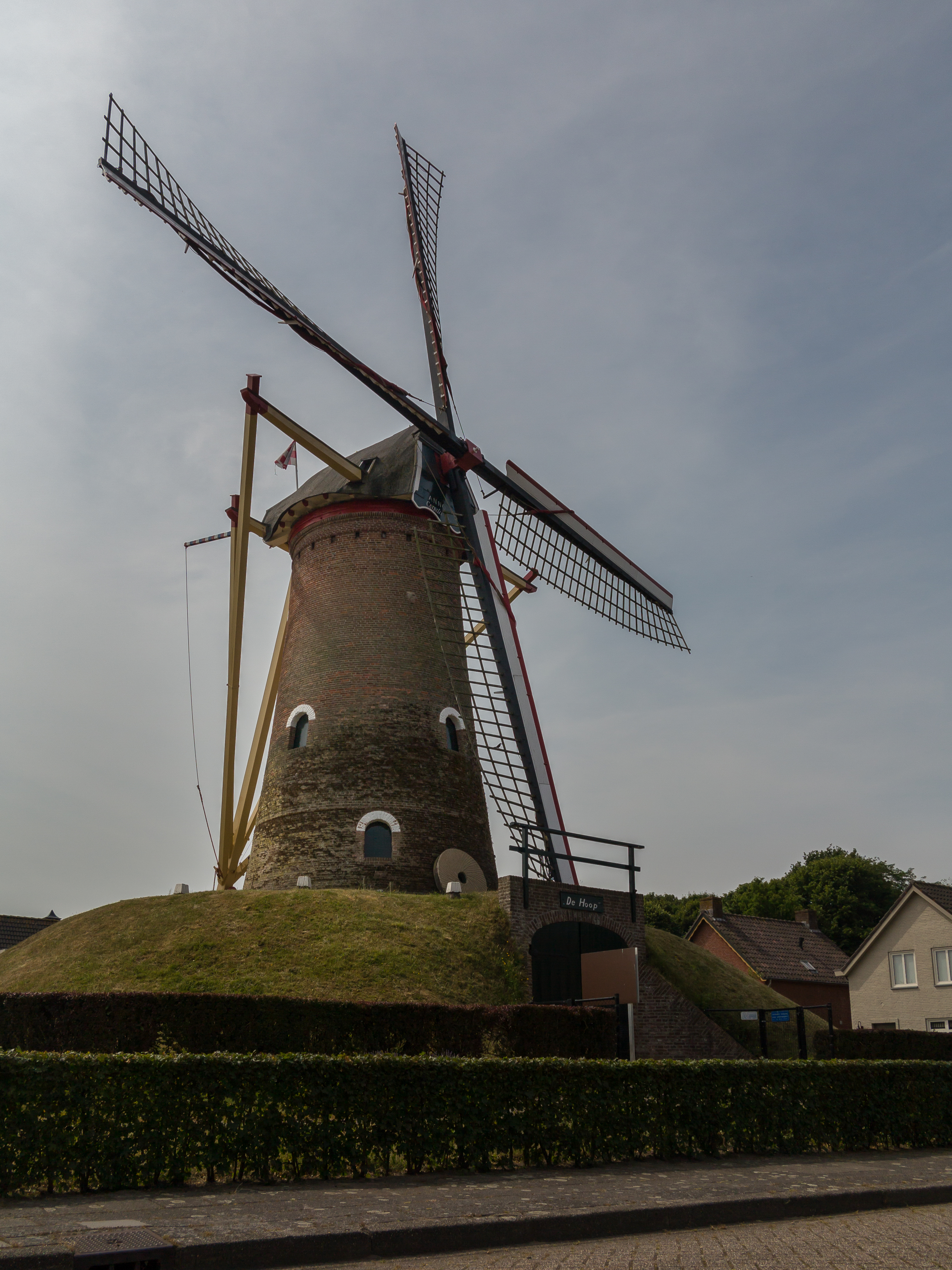
Beltmolen de Hoop

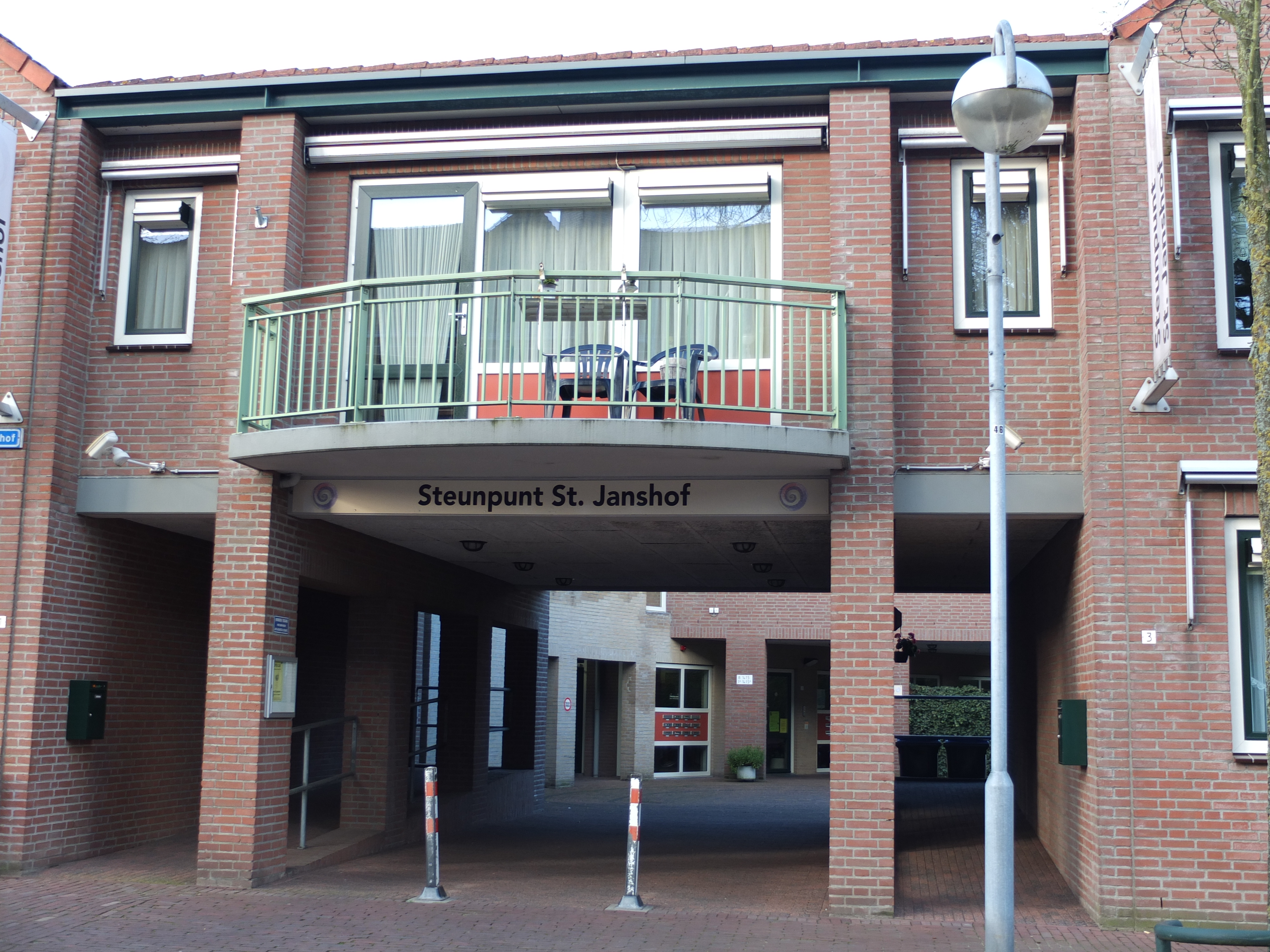
Building in Sprundel

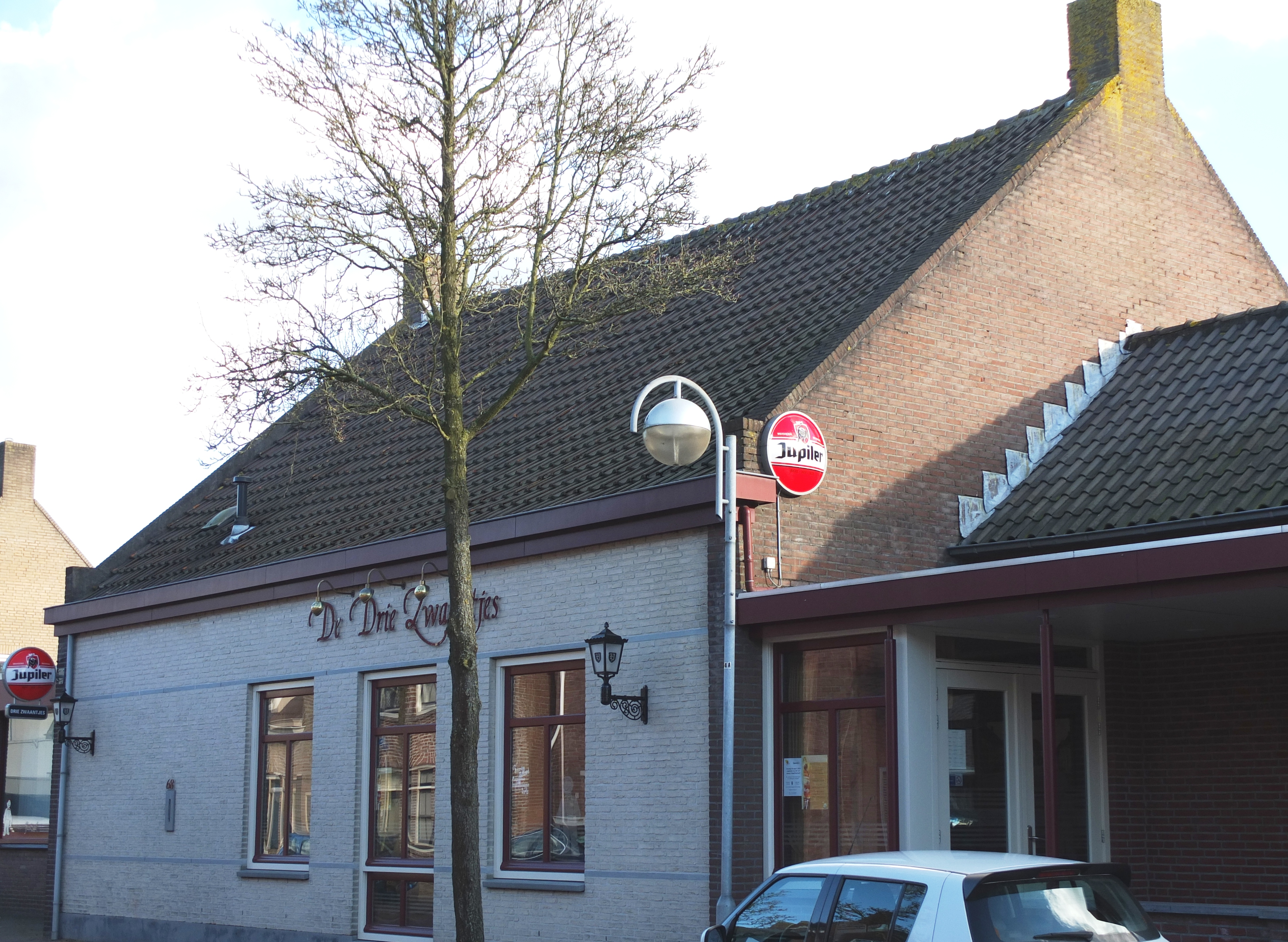
Pub in Sprundel
