= Zegge =

- Village
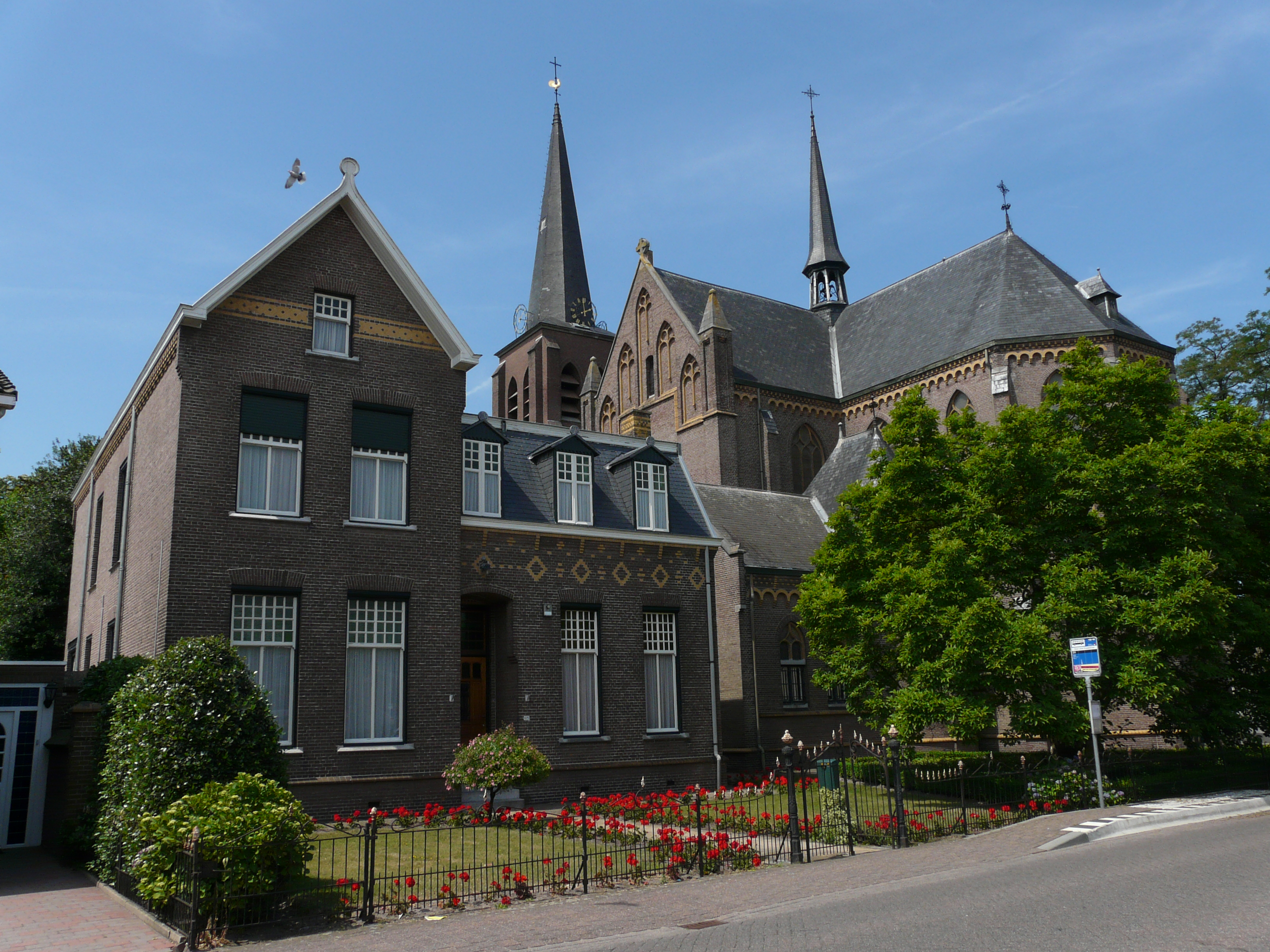
- Heilige Maria Boodschapkerk

- Location in the province of North Brabant in the Netherlands Zegge (Netherlands)
- Coordinates: 51°33′21″N 4°31′1″E
- Country: Netherlands
- Province: North Brabant
- Municipality: Rucphen

Area
  - Total: 5.20 km^{2} (2.01 sq mi)
- Elevation: 5.1 m (17 ft)

Population (2021)
  - Total: 2,035
  - Density: 391/km^{2} (1,010/sq mi)
- Time zone: UTC+1 (CET)
  - Summer (DST): UTC+2 (CEST)
- Postal code: 4735
- Dialing code: 0165

Zegge is a village located in the municipality of Rucphen, North Brabant in the Netherlands. On 1 January 2020, the village had 2,045 inhabitants. Viewed from the four other villages in the municipality of Rucphen, Zegge is located on the other side of the A58 motorway. This combined with its small size, makes it so that much of the daily life of its inhabitants centers around the nearby city of Roosendaal.

== Etymology ==
The name Zegge comes from low-lying and often submerged pasture, where a lot of sedge (zegge in Dutch) occurs and also reed grass that is popularly referred to as zegge. The village "Zegge" is not the same as (the adjacent) "Seppe". This is an airport that was officially named Breda International Airport in 2014, but is still popularly called Seppe.

== History ==
In 1125 the area around Zegge was referred to as Thurlicht-ter-Venne. The Deurlechts Vaartje, west of Zegge, is a reminder of this old name. It was part of the Dorlecht area. It was a border area between the lordships of Breda and Bergen op Zoom, which was split off from it. When settling the border disputes between the two areas in 1291 they were referred to as De Moeren boven Kalsdonk (The swamps above Kalsdonk), these belonged to Bergen op Zoom. In 1354 people spoke of Nieuwe Dorlecht (New Dorlecht), whereby the Thurlicht-ter-Venne was known as Oude Dorlecht (Old Dorlecht).

The border was finally settled in 1458. The current Zegge, then called Land van Bergen boven den Nieuwenberg (Land of Mountains above the Nieuwenberg), still belonged to Bergen op Zoom. To the long name was added: alias Zegge, and during the 18th century the name Den Lande van Zegge (The Lands of Zegge) became more and more common.

Zegge formed an independent estate with its own 'schepenbank'. This was chaired by the landdrost of the east quarter of Bergen op Zoom. The 'schepenbank' had the high jurisdiction.

Dyeing of this and surrounding areas began in 1290. 300 bunder of land was issued to Gerard de Spiekere by Raso I van Gaveren, Lord of Breda. The first occupation was reported in the 14th century. In 1687 about 300 people lived there, a number that remained almost constant for centuries, only to increase noticeably in the 2nd half of the 19th century.

For a long time, Zegge was therefore not an independent parish, but only had a chapel. It is said that this Mariakapel (Virgin Mary chapel) was founded by a seaman after the St. Elisabeth's flood of 1421. This would have been built as a thanks for his safe return home. The chapel was first mentioned in writing in 1459. A new chapel is said to have been built later, dedicated to the Annunciation, described in 1615. The chapel attracted many pilgrims. From 1648 the chapel was no longer allowed to be used by Catholics, but it was re-opened in 1810. In 1833 the chapel was elevated to a parish church, but in 1848 a church was built opposite the chapel and has functioned as such ever since. The new, current parish church was completed in 1912. The chapel was replaced by the current one in 1922. Pilgrimages still take place, and a procession is held on 31 May to close the month of May.

== Stagnation ==
As a small core, the permitted growth of the village has been minimal for many years; only a few additional homes may be built each year. Only its own residents are eligible for building land in the village. There is therefore population aging in the village.

== Places of interest ==
- The Heilige Maria Boodschapkerk is a neo-Gothic church from 1912, designed by Jacques van Groenendael.
- Presbytery, on the Onze Lieve Vrouwestraat
- Chapel Onze-Lieve-Vrouw van de Zeg, is located on 108 Onze Lieve Vrouwestraat, opposite the church. The current chapel dates from 1922, was designed by Jacques van Groenendael and replaces a much older chapel. It is traditionally a place of pilgrimage in connection with a miraculous statue of the Virgin Mary.

== Gallery ==
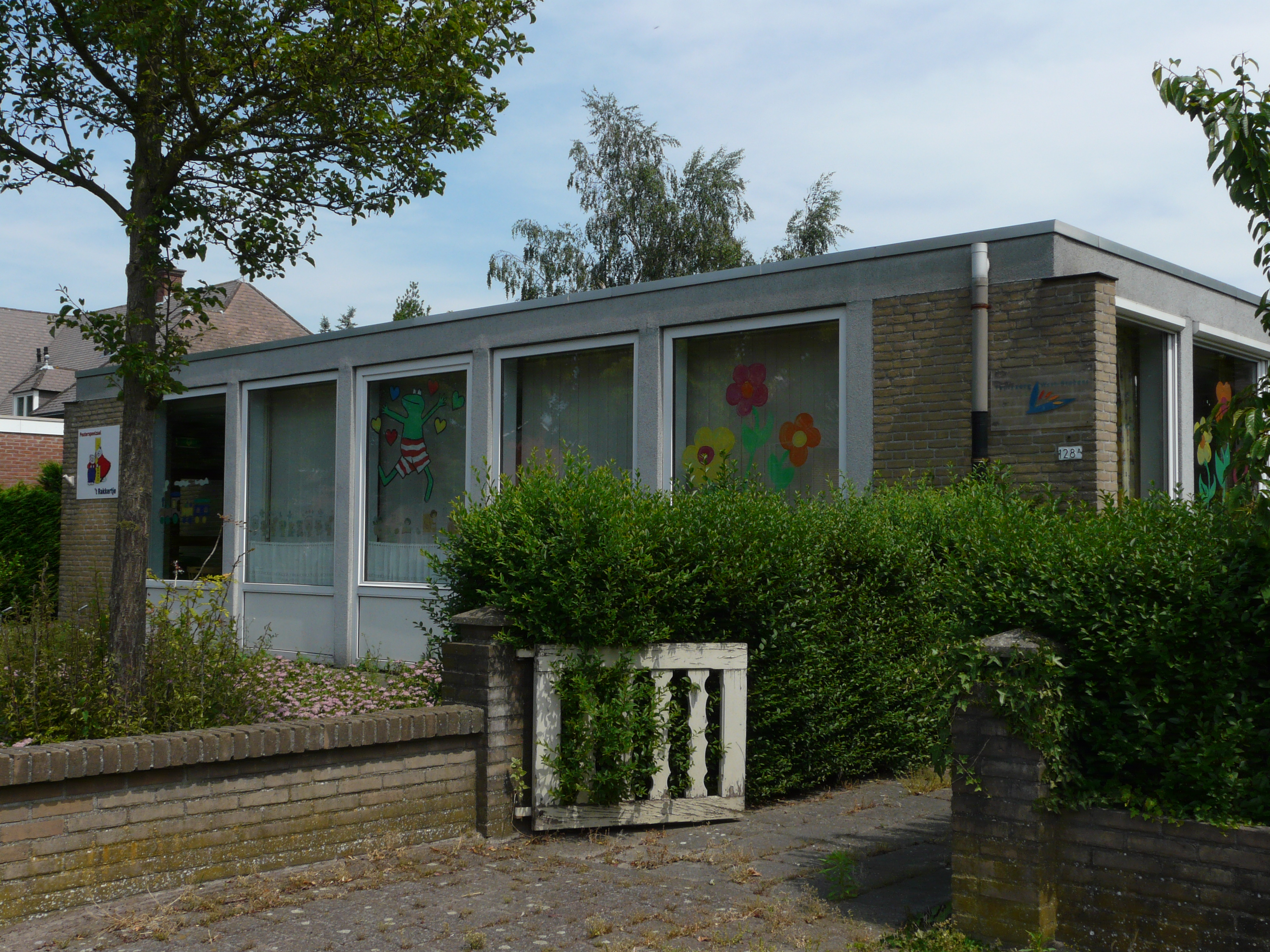
Kindergarten

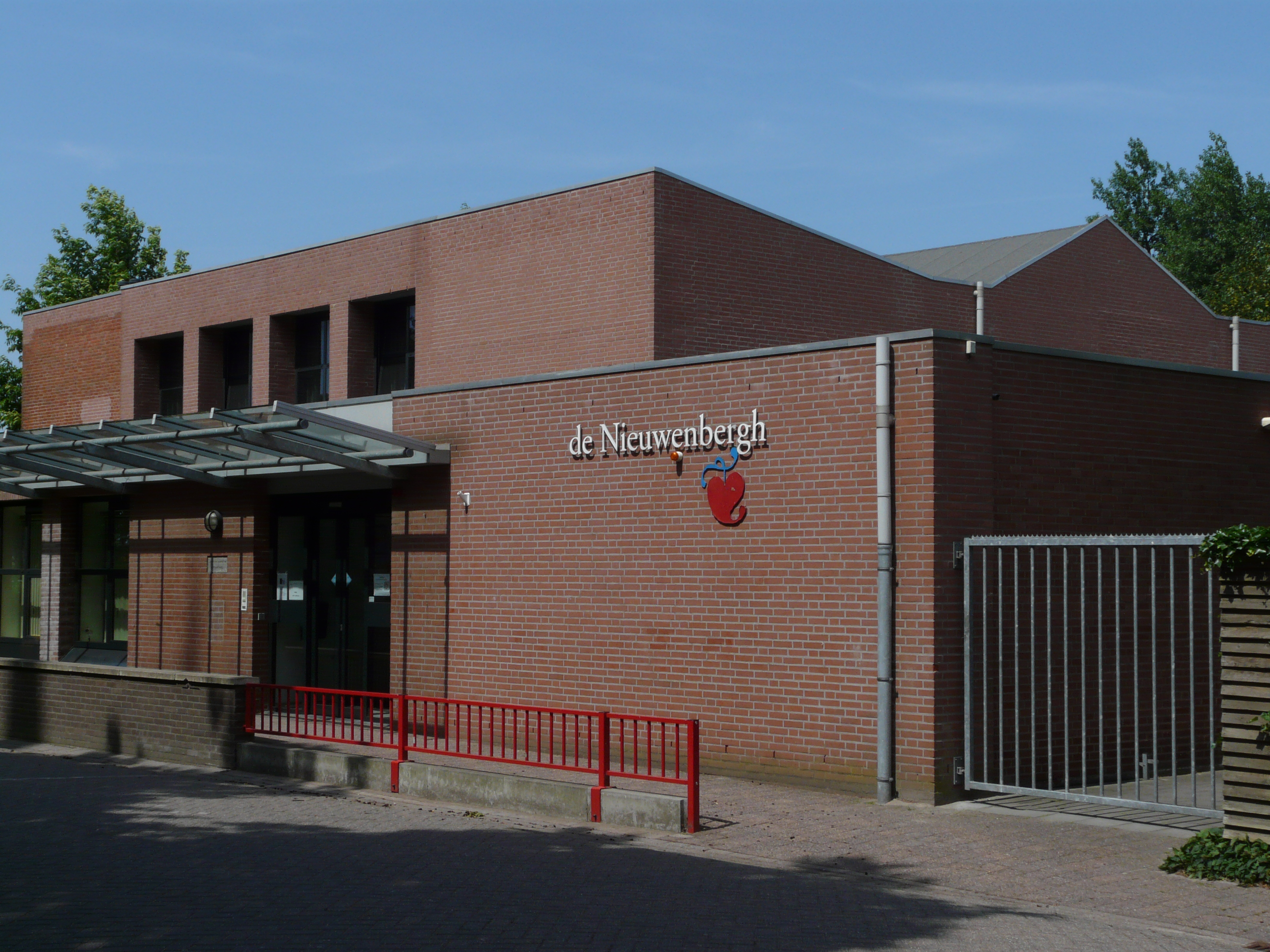
Community house

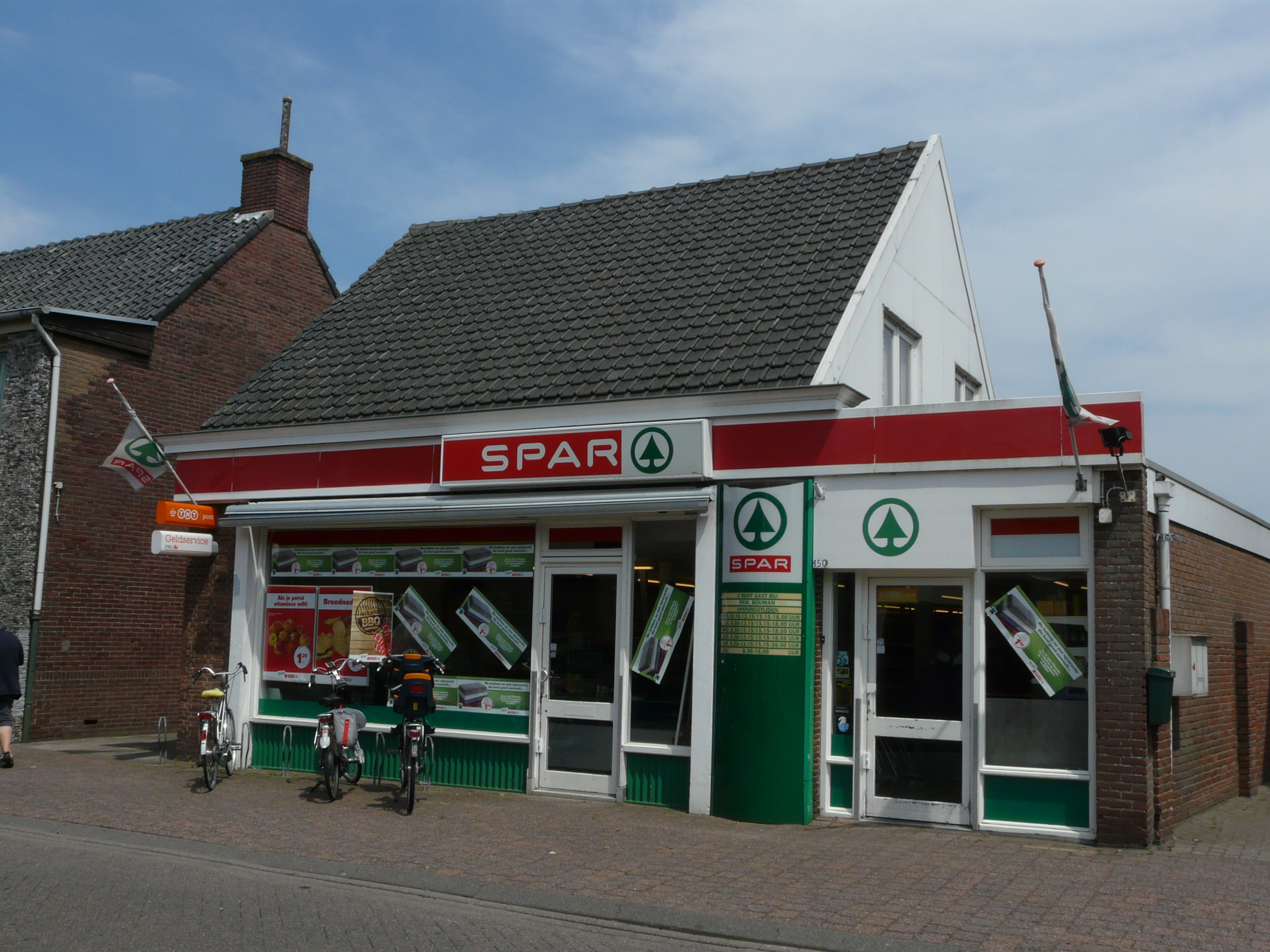
Supermarket in Zegge

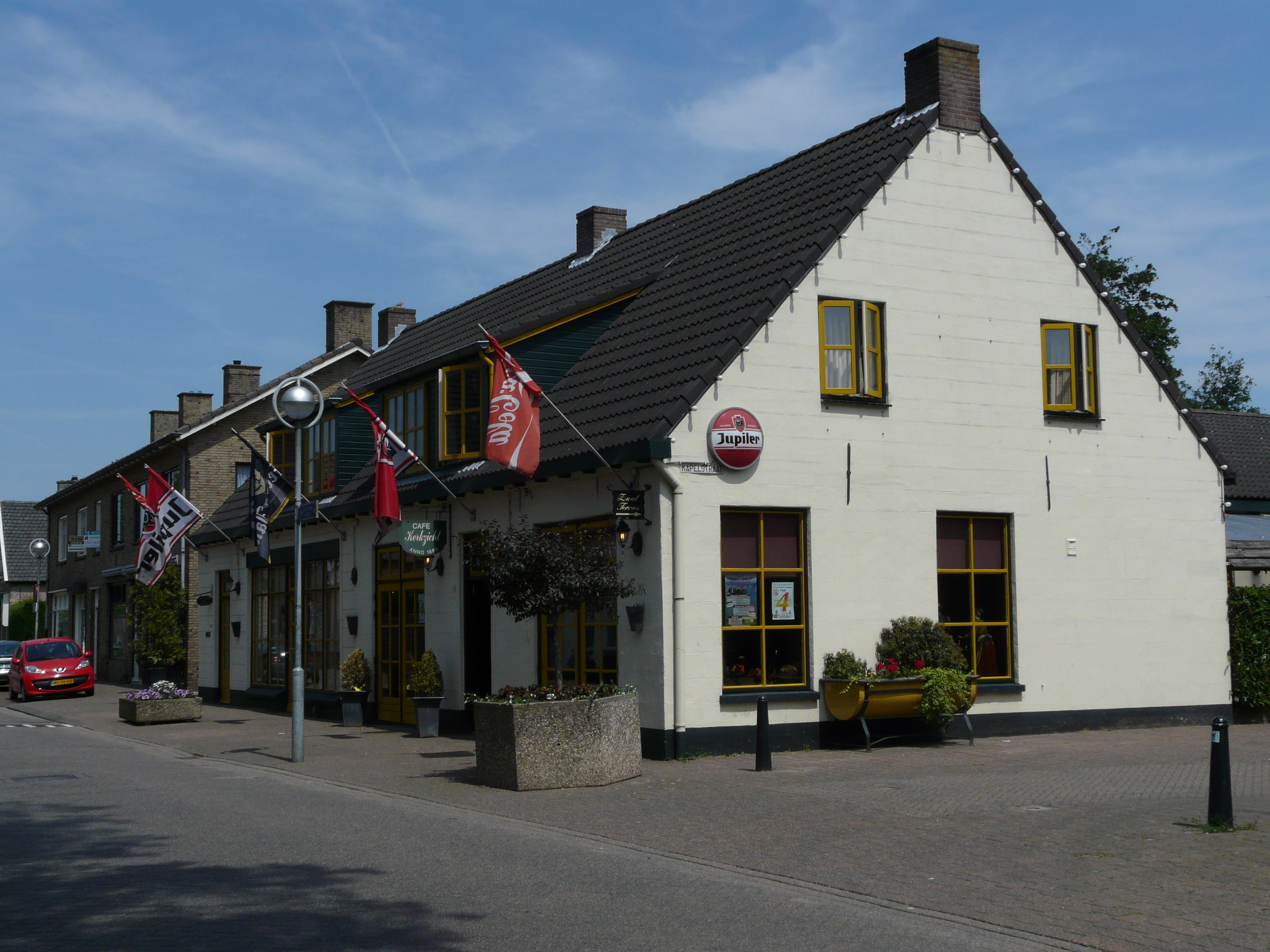
Pub in Zegge
