= Sint Willebrord =

- Town
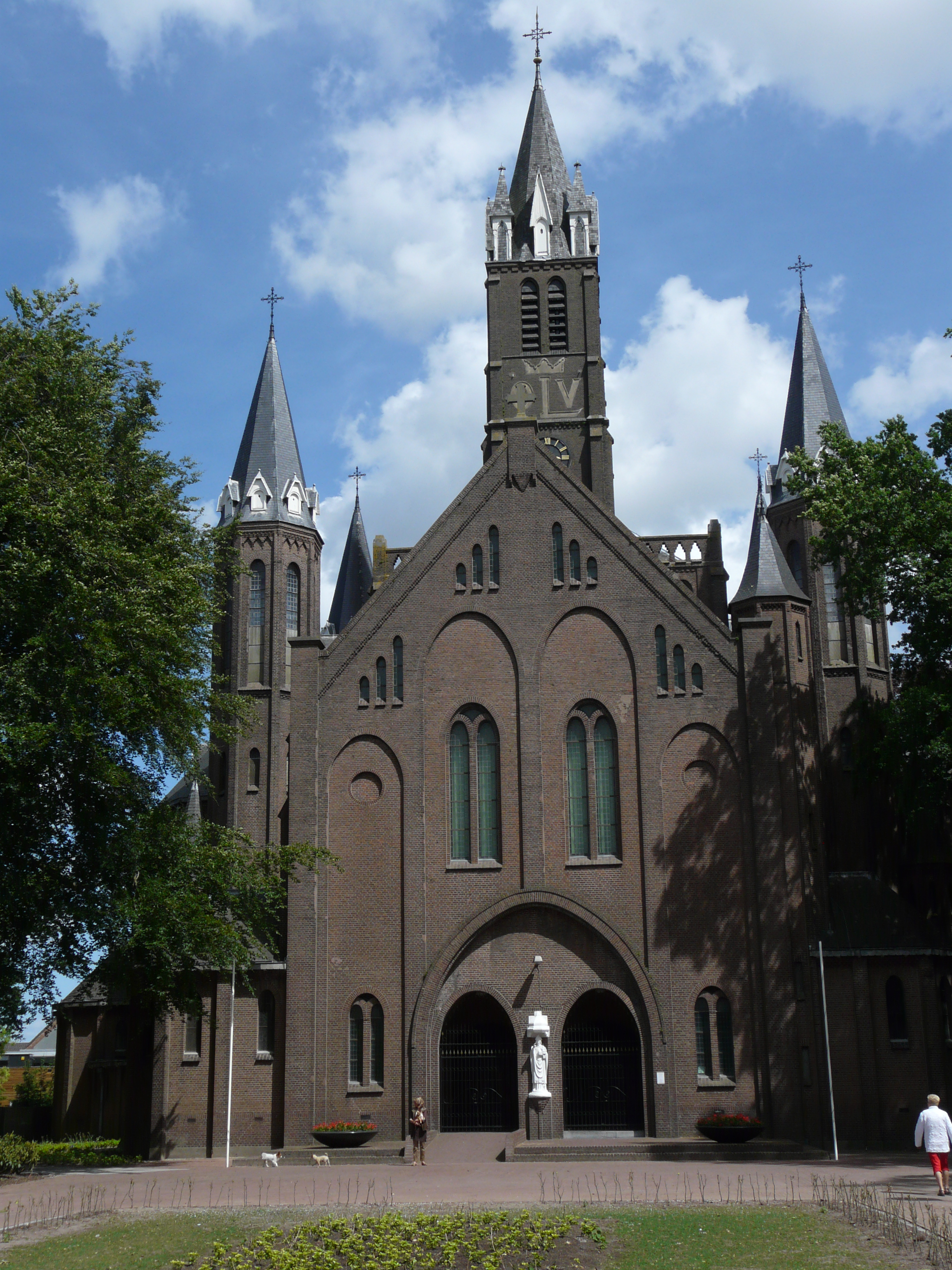
- St Willibrordus Church

- Location in the province of North Brabant in the Netherlands Sint Willebrord (Netherlands)
- Coordinates: 51°33′1″N 4°35′30″E
- Country: Netherlands
- Province: North Brabant
- Municipality: Rucphen

Area
  - Total: 4.34 km^{2} (1.68 sq mi)
- Elevation: 9 m (30 ft)

Population (2025)
  - Total: 9,735
  - Density: 2,240/km^{2} (5,810/sq mi)
- Time zone: UTC+1 (CET)
  - Summer (DST): UTC+2 (CEST)
- Postal code: 4711
- Dialing code: 0165

Sint Willebrord is a town in the municipality of Rucphen in the Netherlands. It is also known by the name 't Heike which was the semi-official name up until 1950/1970 (mostly written as Theike, or less often Heike), which is the diminutive form of hei (heath) in local dialect.

During Carnaval the town goes by the name of Heikneutersland, meaning ´Hillbillies´ land´ or ´Redneck's land´.

== History ==
The former name of Sint Willebrord was 't Heike. In the middle ages, 't Heike was an area the size of 400 bunders (a bit bigger than 400 hectares) used for peat extraction with a small settlement in it. This town was formed on the former boundary between the Baronie of Breda and Het Markizaat of Bergen op Zoom. The eastern part was part of the Baronie of Breda, the western part of Sint Willebrord was Het Markizaat of Bergen op Zoom.

In 1636, it was established that people lived in 't Heike.

In 1841, the name 't Heike got changed to Sint Willebrord, which comes from Saint Willibrord, a monk/missionary. Sint is the usual form in Dutch names to represent saints. Colloquially, the name 't Heike stayed until the 50s-70s. It had 500 residents in 1841.

On the night of 28-29 October, 1944 Sint Willebrord got freed from the Germans.

== Demographics ==
Sint Willebrord has 9,735 residents. As demonstrated in the table below, the biggest age group of Sint Willebrord are middle-aged adults (aged 45-65).

Age distribution of Sint Willebrord (2025)
Age group	Population	Percentage
0-15	1275	13.1%
15-25	940	9.7%
25-45	2290	23.5%
45-65	2990	30.7%
65+	2240	23%

91% of residents are born in the Netherlands, 9% are foreign-born residents.

51,7% of foreign-born residents are born outside of Europe, 48,3% are born inside of Europe.

== Facilities ==
Sint Willebrord has 2 elementary schools; the Willibrordusschool and De Heilinde.

There are 3 GPs, at the Pastoor Bastiaansensingel, De Gagelrijzen and Emmastraat.

There is also a pharmacy called Saturnus.

Sint Willebrord has 3 supermarkets, a Dirk, an Aldi and a Jumbo.

There is also Asian restaurant O&O, a Michelin star restaurant.

== Transportation ==
Bus 162 goes through Sint-Willebrord. Bus 162 goes from Roosendaal to Etten-Leur.

== Sport ==
Cyclist Wim van Est and footballer Rini (Pallack) Konings were famous sports personalities from Sint Willebrord. The 2022 Vuelta a España went through Sint Willebrord at the 3rd etappe.

== Gallery ==
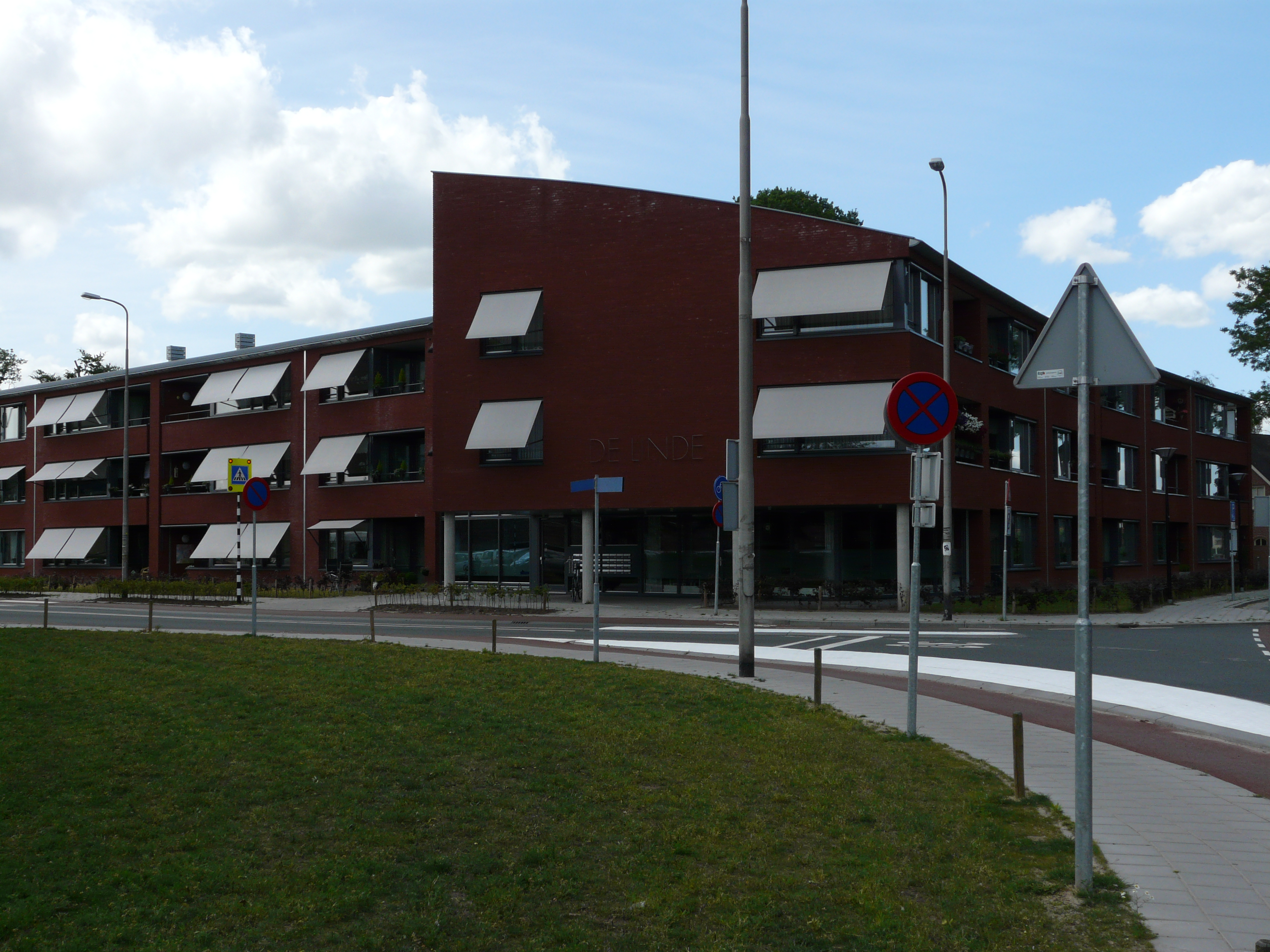
Apartment building

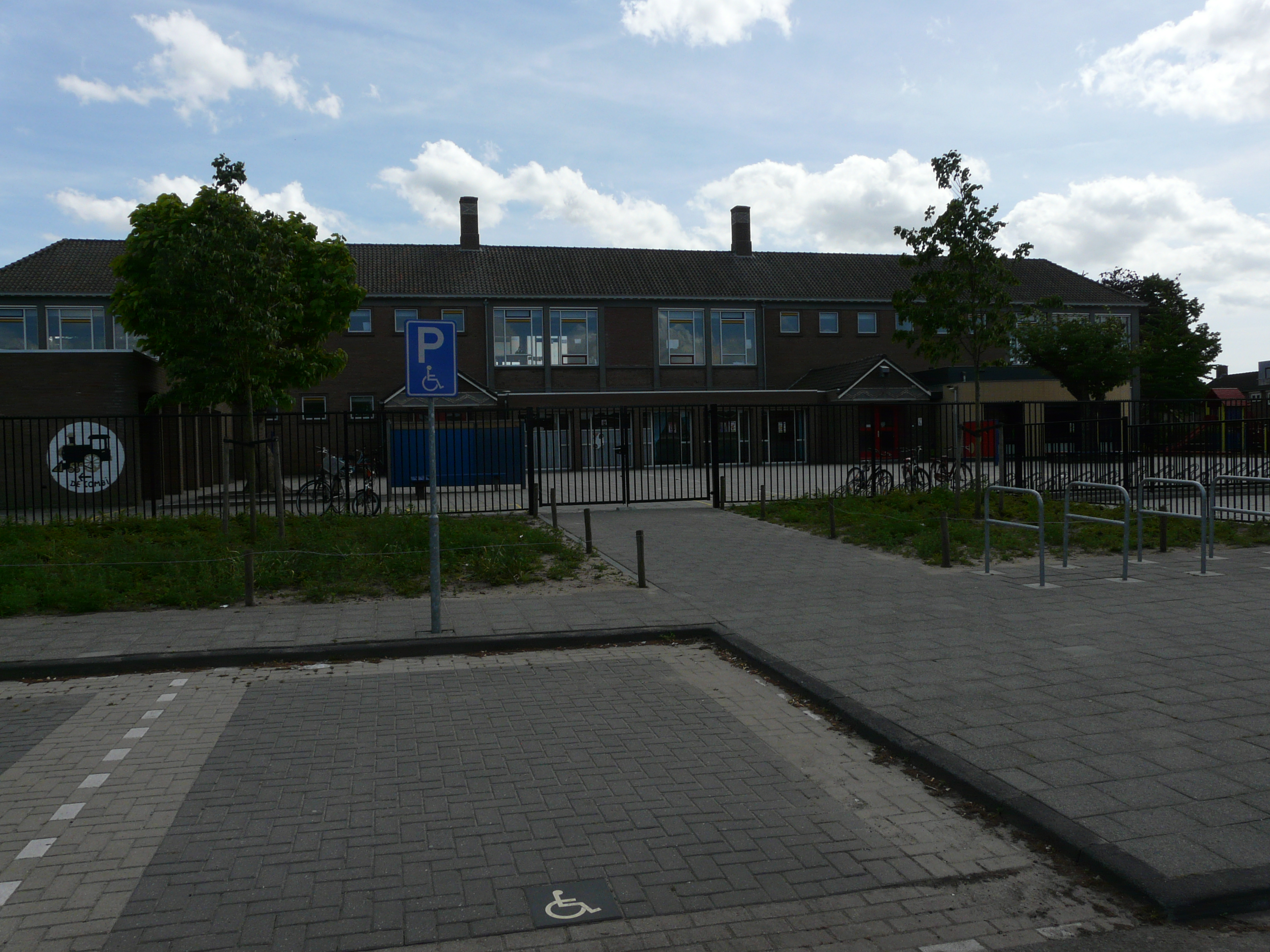
School in Sint Willebrord

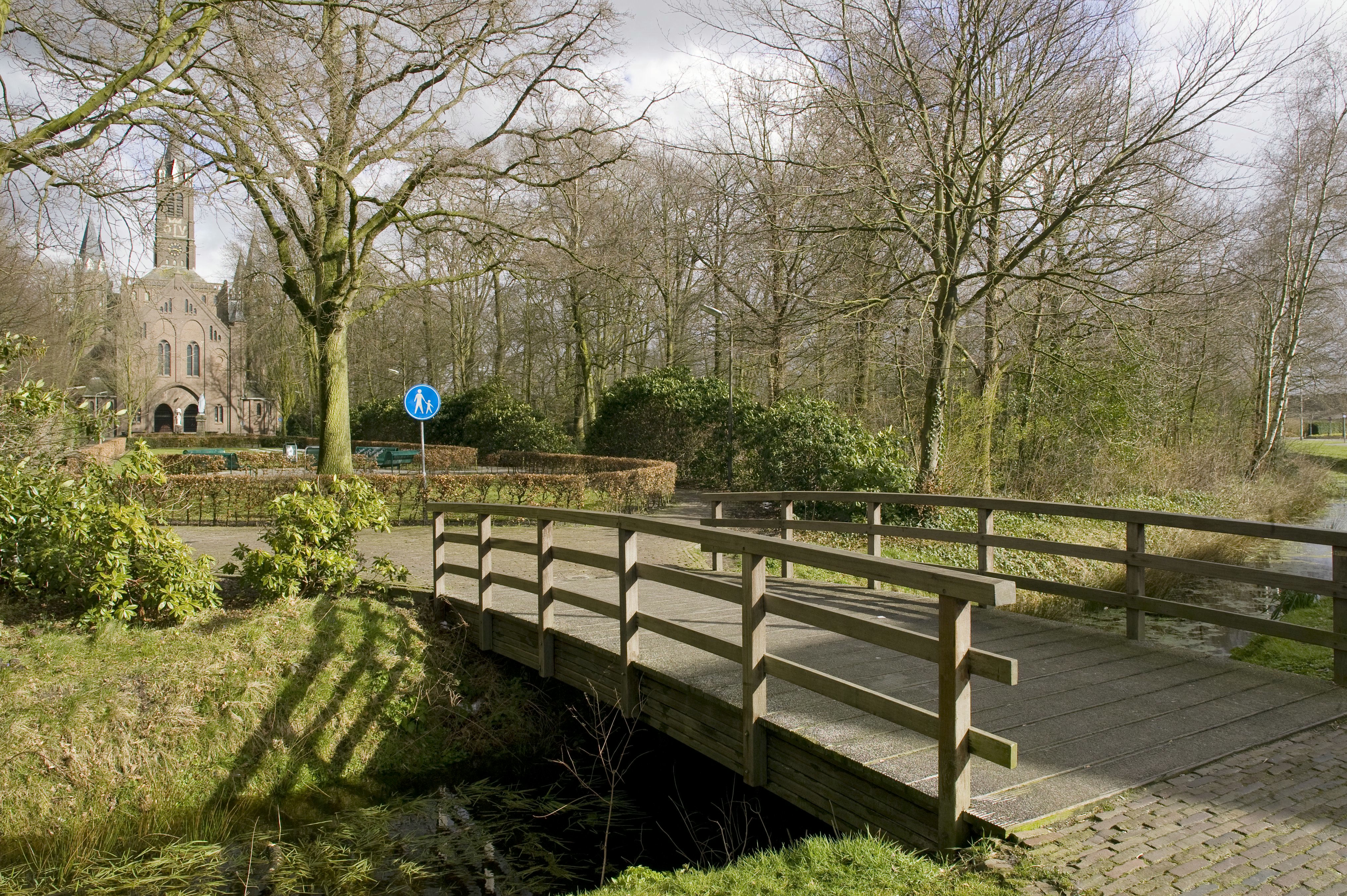
Park in Sint Willebrord
